= 1998 Copa CONMEBOL finals =

- Event: 1998 Copa CONMEBOL
Santos	Rosario Central
(Brazil)	(Argentina)
1	0
- (on aggregate)

First leg
Santos	Rosario Central
1	0
- Date: October 7, 1998
- Venue: Estádio Urbano Caldeira, Santos, São Paulo
- Referee: José L. Da Rosa (Uruguay)
- Attendance: 17,400

Second leg
Rosario Central	Santos
0	0
- Date: October 21, 1998
- Venue: Gigante de Arroyito, Rosario
- Referee: Ubaldo Aquino (Paraguay)
- Attendance: 46,000

The 1998 Copa CONMEBOL finals were the final match series to decide the winner of the 1998 Copa CONMEBOL, a continental cup competition organised by CONMEBOL. The final was contested by Argentine club Rosario Central and Brazilian Santos FC.

Played under a two-legged tie system, Santos won the first leg held in Estádio Urbano Caldeira in Santos, São Paulo. As the second leg at Estadio Gigante de Arroyito in Rosario ended in a 0–0 tie, Santos won 10 on aggregate, achieving their first Cup trophy.

The series became infamous for the tough play from both sides, with many players being penalised with yellow cards and even sent off (only in the second leg in Arroyito, the referee showed the yellow card to eight players and sent off two).

== Qualified teams ==
Team	Previous final app.
(Brazil) Santos	(none)
(Argentina) Rosario Central	**1995**

- **Bold** indicates winning years

== Venues ==
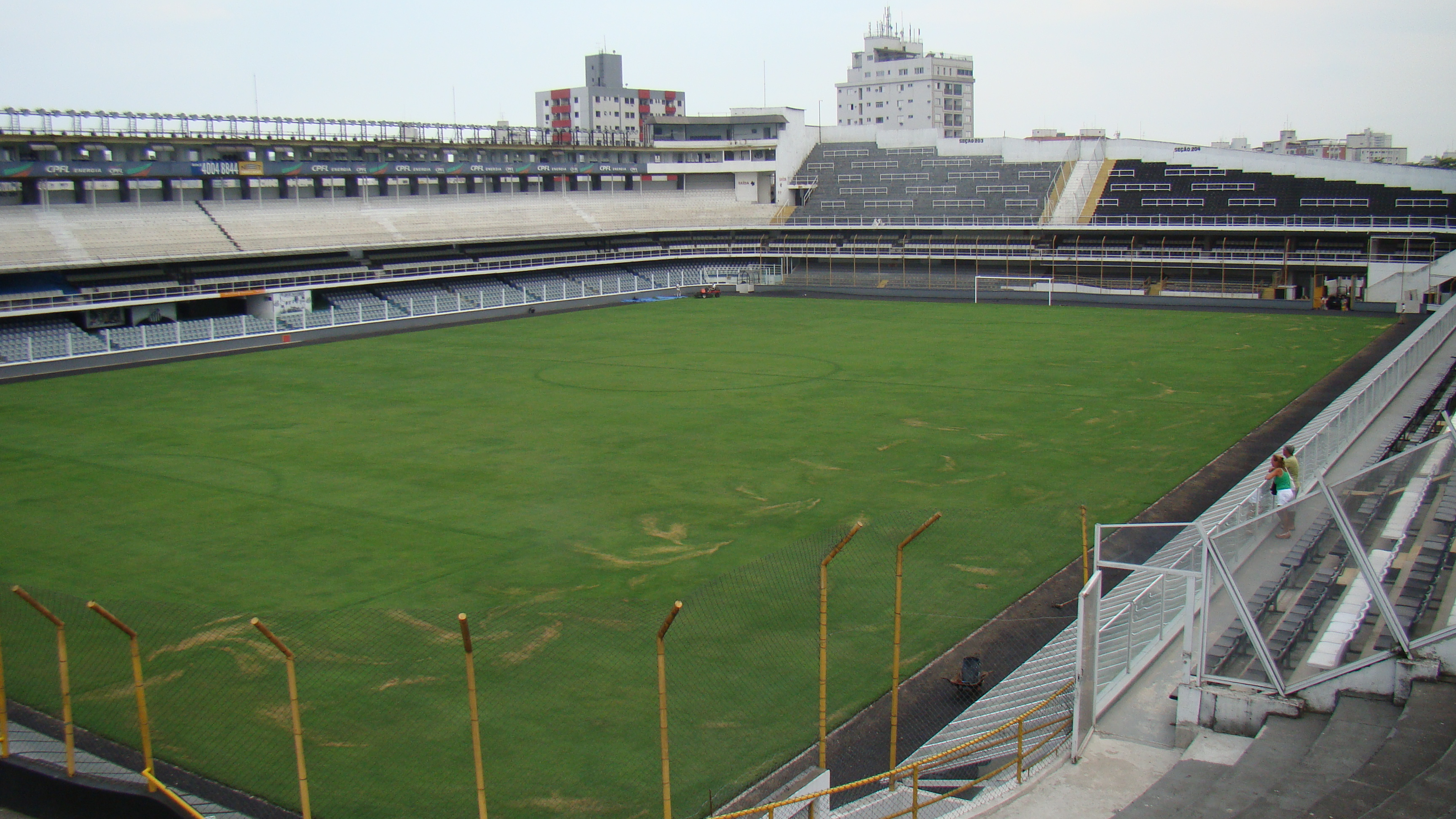
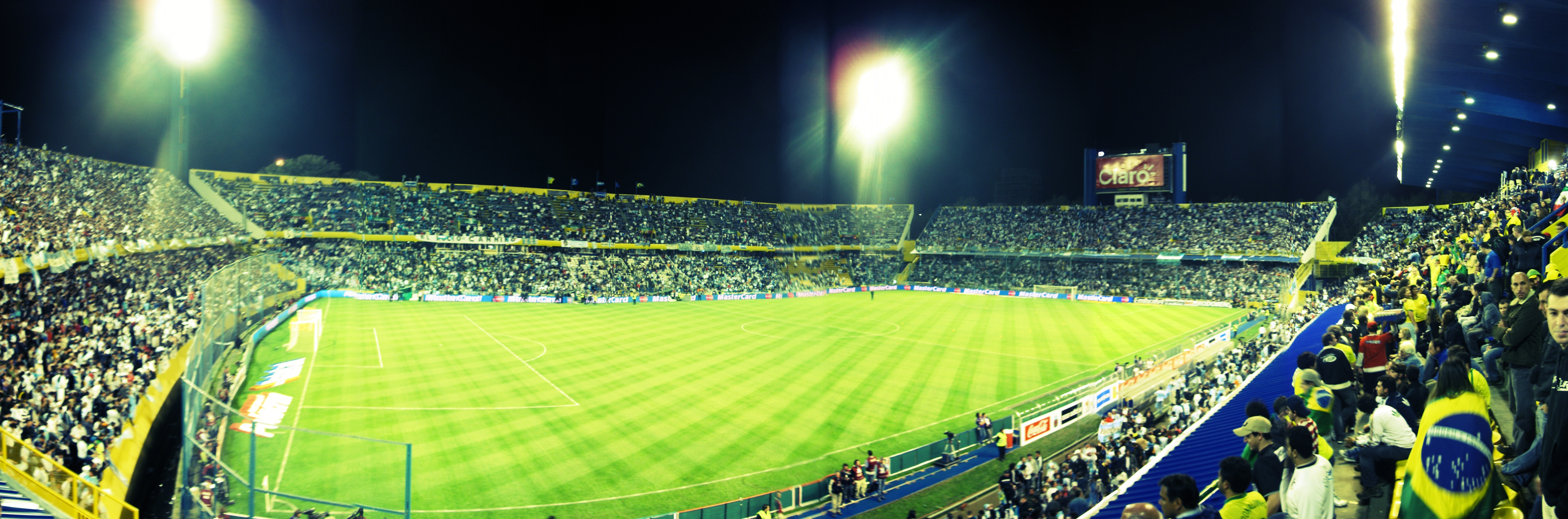
Urbano Caldeira (left) and Gigante de Arroyito, venues for the series

== Route to the final ==
Note: In all scores below, the score of the home team is given first.

(Brazil) Santos			Round	(Argentina) Rosario Central		
Opponent	Venue	Score		Opponent	Venue	Score
(Colombia) Once Caldas (tied 3–3 on aggregate, won on penalties)	Home	2–1	First round	(Chile) Audax Italiano (won 2–1 on aggregate)	Home	2–0
(Colombia) Once Caldas (tied 3–3 on aggregate, won on penalties)	Away	2–1 (2–3 p)	First round	(Chile) Audax Italiano (won 2–1 on aggregate)	Away	1–0
(Ecuador) LDU Quito (won 5–2 on aggregate)	Away	2–2	Quarter-finals	(Uruguay) Huracán Buceo (won 5–2 on aggregate)	Away	2–3
(Ecuador) LDU Quito (won 5–2 on aggregate)	Home	3–0	Quarter-finals	(Uruguay) Huracán Buceo (won 5–2 on aggregate)	Home	2–0
(Brazil) Sampaio Corrêa (won 5–1 on aggregate)	Home	0–0	Semi-finals	(Brazil) Atlético Mineiro (won 2–1 on aggregate)	Home	1–1
(Brazil) Sampaio Corrêa (won 5–1 on aggregate)	Away	1–5	Semi-finals	(Brazil) Atlético Mineiro (won 2–1 on aggregate)	Away	0–1

== Match details ==
=== First leg ===
1998 Copa CONMEBOL Final
October 7, 1998
First leg

Santos FC (Brazil)	1–0	(Argentina) Rosario Central
Claudiomiro 28'	Report

Estádio Urbano Caldeira, Santos
Attendance: 14,700
Referee: José L. Da Rosa (Uruguay)

**Santos**	**Rosario Central**

GK	1	(Brazil) Zetti
DF	4	(Brazil) Ânderson Lima	(yellow card) 20'
DF	13	(Brazil) Jean	(red card) 39'
DF	5	(Brazil) Claudiomiro		(substituted off) 80'
DF	3	(Brazil) Athirson
MF	17	(Brazil) Marcos Bazílio		(substituted off) 80'
MF	8	(Brazil) Narciso
MF	23	(Brazil) Eduardo Marques
MF	7	(Brazil) Lúcio
FW	19	(Brazil) Alessandro Cambalhota		(substituted off) 71'
FW	9	(Brazil) Viola	(red card) 10'
Substitutes:
FW	11	(Brazil) Adiel		(substituted on) 71'
MF	18	(Brazil) Fernandes		(substituted on) 80'
MF	24	(Brazil) Gustavo Nery		(substituted on) 80'
Manager:
(Brazil) Émerson Leão

GK	1	(Argentina) José Buljubasich
DF	4	(Argentina) Darío Marra	(yellow card) 52'
DF	13	(Argentina) Germán Gerbaudo	(yellow card) 7'
DF	6	(Argentina) Maximiliano Cuberas	(yellow card) 83'
DF	3	(Paraguay) Juan Ramón Jara
MF	5	(Argentina) Hugo M. González		(substituted off) 80'
MF	14	(Argentina) Christian Daniele	(yellow card) 56'
MF	8	(Argentina) Javier Cappelletti	(yellow card) 45+4'
MF	19	(Argentina) Walter Gaitán		(substituted off) 46'
MF	10	(Argentina) Marcelo Carracedo	(red card) 57'
FW	9	(Argentina) Darío Scotto	(red card) 10'
Substitutes:
FW	7	(Argentina) E. Bustos Montoya	(red card) 84'	(substituted on) 46'
MF	21	(Argentina) Rubén Villarreal		(substituted on) 80'
Manager:
(Argentina) Edgardo Bauza

=== Second leg ===
October 21, 1998
Second leg

Rosario Central (Argentina)	0–0	(Brazil) Santos
	Report

Gigante de Arroyito, Rosario
Attendance: 46,000
Referee: Ubaldo Aquino (Paraguay)

**Rosario Central**	**Santos**

GK	1	(Argentina) José Buljubasich
DF	4	(Argentina) Darío Marra		(yellow card) 22' (substituted off) 74'
DF	13	(Argentina) Germán Gerbaudo
DF	6	(Argentina) Maximiliano Cuberas		(yellow card) 83'
DF	3	(Paraguay) Juan Ramón Jara
MF	5	(Argentina) Hugo M. González		(substituted off) 57'
MF	14	(Argentina) Christian Daniele		(red card) 72'
MF	11	(Argentina) Germán Rivarola
MF	19	(Argentina) Walter Gaitán
FW	17	(Argentina) Sebastián Flores		(yellow card) 20'
FW	16	(Argentina) Rafael Maceratesi		(substituted off) 63'
Substitutes:
MF	23	(Argentina) Ezequiel González		(substituted on) 57'
FW	20	(Argentina) Emanuel Ruiz		(substituted on) 63'
MF	8	(Argentina) Javier Cappelletti	Booked	(substituted on) 74'
Manager:
(Argentina) Edgardo Bauza

GK	1	(Brazil) Zetti
DF	4	(Brazil) Ânderson Lima
DF	6	(Brazil) Sandro Barbosa	(yellow card) 58'
DF	5	(Brazil) Claudiomiro	(yellow card) 22'
DF	3	(Brazil) Athirson	(yellow card) 76'
MF	17	(Brazil) Marcos Bazílio	(yellow card) 39'
MF	8	(Brazil) Narciso	(yellow card) 34'
MF	23	(Brazil) Eduardo Marques	(yellow card) 45' (yellow-red card) 64'
MF	16	(Brazil) Élder
FW	18	(Brazil) Fernandes		(substituted off) 76'
FW	19	(Brazil) Alessandro Cambalhota		(substituted off) 85'
Substitutes:
DF	14	(Brazil) Baiano		(substituted on) 76'
MF	11	(Brazil) Adiel		(substituted on) 85'
Manager:
(Brazil) Émerson Leão

== See also ==
- 1998 Copa CONMEBOL
