= 1998 Santos FC season =

1998 brazilian club season

Santos
1998 season
- President: Samir Jorge Abdul-Hak
- Coach: Émerson Leão
- Stadium: Vila Belmiro
- Campeonato Brasileiro: Semi-finals
- Campeonato Paulista: Second phase
- Copa do Brasil: Semi-finals
- Copa Conmebol: Winners
- Torneio Rio-São Paulo: Semi-finals
- Top goalscorer: League: Viola (21); All: Viola (34)

The 1998 season was Santos Futebol Clube's eighty-sixth in existence and the club's third-ninth consecutive season in the top flight of Brazilian football.

== Players ==
=== Squad ===
Note: Flags indicate national team as defined under FIFA eligibility rules; some limited exceptions apply. Players may hold more than one non-FIFA nationality.

No.	Pos.	Nation	Player
—	GK	BRA	Fernando Leão
—	GK	BRA	Marcelo
—	GK	BRA	Nando
—	GK	BRA	Zetti
—	DF	BRA	Ânderson Lima
—	DF	BRA	Argel
—	DF	BRA	Athirson
—	DF	BRA	Baiano
—	DF	BRA	Gustavo Nery
—	DF	BRA	Jean
—	DF	BRA	Rogério Seves
—	DF	BRA	Sandro
—	MF	BRA	Bechara
—	MF	BRA	Claudiomiro

No.	Pos.	Nation	Player
—	MF	BRA	Eduardo Marques
—	MF	BRA	Élder
—	MF	BRA	Róbson Luís
—	MF	BRA	Fernandes
—	MF	BRA	Jorginho
—	MF	BRA	Lúcio
—	MF	JPN	Maezono
—	MF	BRA	Marcos Bazílio
—	MF	BRA	Messias
—	MF	BRA	Narciso
—	FW	BRA	Alessandro Cambalhota
—	FW	BRA	Adiel
—	FW	COL	Aristizábal
—	FW	BRA	Viola

Source: Acervo Santista

=== Statistics ===
==== Appearances and goals ====
Pos.	Nat	Name	Campeonato Brasileiro Série A		Campeonato Paulista		Copa do Brasil		Torneio Rio-São Paulo		Copa Conmebol		Total	
Pos.	Nat	Name	Apps	Goals	Apps	Goals	Apps	Goals	Apps	Goals	Apps	Goals	Apps	Goals
GK	(Brazil)	Fernando Leão	1	0	0	0	0	0	0	0	0	0	1	0
GK	(Brazil)	Nando	0	0	0	0	0	0	0	0	1	0	1	0
GK	(Brazil)	Zetti	28	0	10	0	9	0	8	0	7	0	62	0
DF	(Brazil)	Ânderson Lima	17	3	9 (1)	0	7	2	8	1	8	0	50	6
DF	(Brazil)	Argel	21	2	10	1	9	3	8	0	6	1	54	7
DF	(Brazil)	Athirson	25	1	2 (1)	0	0	0	0	0	8	0	36	1
DF	(Brazil)	Baiano	11 (7)	1	1 (3)	0	3 (1)	0	0 (3)	0	0 (1)	0	30	1
DF	(Brazil)	Gustavo Nery	4 (5)	1	0	0	0	0	0	0	0 (2)	0	11	1
DF	(Brazil)	Jean	17	0	0	0	0	0	0	0	5 (1)	0	23	0
DF	(Brazil)	Sandro	8 (1)	0	1 (1)	0	4	0	0 (3)	1	3	0	21	1
MF	(Brazil)	Bechara	1 (4)	1	0	0	0	0	0	0	0	0	5	1
MF	(Brazil)	Claudiomiro	21	3	4	0	0	0	0	0	7	2	32	5
MF	(Brazil)	Eduardo Marques	16 (3)	3	0 (4)	2	0 (4)	0	0 (5)	0	3	1	35	6
MF	(Brazil)	Élder	9 (8)	0	3 (1)	0	6 (2)	2	4 (1)	0	1 (3)	0	38	2
MF	(Brazil)	Fernandes	2 (6)	1	0	0	0	0	0	0	2 (4)	0	14	1
MF	(Brazil)	Jorginho	12 (3)	1	10	2	9	3	8	4	5	2	47	12
MF	(Brazil)	Lúcio	18	5	5	2	0	0	0	0	7	2	30	9
MF	(Japan)	Maezono	0 (5)	1	0	0	0	0	0	0	0	0	5	1
MF	(Brazil)	Marcos Bazílio	18 (2)	0	0	0	0 (3)	0	1	0	4	0	28	0
MF	(Brazil)	Messias	8 (7)	2	0	0	0	0	0	0	0	0	15	2
MF	(Brazil)	Narciso	20	2	9	2	8	0	8	0	7	1	52	5
MF	(Brazil)	Róbson Luís	10	2	0	0	0	0	0	0	0	0	10	2
FW	(Brazil)	Adiel	5 (14)	0	0 (1)	0	1 (2)	0	0	0	3 (5)	1	31	1
FW	(Brazil)	Alessandro	16 (8)	4	0	0	0	0	0	0	5 (3)	0	32	4
FW	(Colombia)	Aristizábal	2 (2)	1	0	0	0	0	0	0	0	0	4	1
FW	(Brazil)	Viola	28	21	4	1	5	5	0	0	6	4	43	31
Players who left the club during the season
DF	(Brazil)	Dutra	0	0	7 (3)	0	9	0	8	0	0	0	27	0
DF	(Brazil)	Ronaldão	0	0	9	1	5	0	8	1	0	0	22	2
DF	(Brazil)	Ronaldo Marconato	0	0	0	0	0 (2)	0	0	0	0	0	2	0
MF	(Brazil)	Arinélson	0	0	0 (2)	0	1 (1)	0	1 (2)	0	0	0	7	0
MF	(Brazil)	Caíco	0	0	6 (2)	3	9	0	7 (1)	1	0	0	25	4
MF	(Brazil)	Fumagalli	0	0	0	0	0 (2)	0	0	0	0 (1)	0	3	0
MF	(Brazil)	Marcos Assunção	0	0	5	1	3	3	3	1	0	0	11	5
FW	(Paraguay)	Báez	0	0	0 (3)	0	0 (1)	0	2 (3)	2	0 (1)	0	10	2
FW	(Brazil)	Caio	0	0	5	0	3	1	5 (1)	2	0	0	14	3
FW	(Brazil)	Macedo	0	0	0 (3)	0	0 (2)	1	1 (3)	1	0	0	9	2
FW	(Brazil)	Müller	0	0	10	8	8	4	8	0	0	0	26	12

Source: Match reports in Competitive matches

==== Goalscorers ====
Ran	Pos	Nat	Name	Brasileiro	Paulistão	Copa do Brasil	Rio-SP	Copa Conmebol	Total
1	FW	(Brazil)	Viola	21	1	5	0	4	31
2	MF	(Brazil)	Jorginho	1	2	3	4	2	12
2	FW	(Brazil)	Müller	0	8	4	0	0	12
3	MF	(Brazil)	Lúcio	5	2	0	0	2	9
4	DF	(Brazil)	Argel	2	1	3	0	1	7
5	DF	(Brazil)	Ânderson Lima	3	0	2	1	0	6
5	MF	(Brazil)	Eduardo Marques	3	2	0	0	1	6
6	MF	(Brazil)	Claudiomiro	3	0	0	0	2	5
6	MF	(Brazil)	Marcos Assunção	0	1	3	1	0	5
6	MF	(Brazil)	Narciso	2	2	0	0	1	5
7	FW	(Brazil)	Alessandro	4	0	0	0	0	4
7	MF	(Brazil)	Caíco	0	3	1	0	0	4
8	FW	(Brazil)	Caio	0	0	1	2	0	3
9	FW	(Paraguay)	Báez	0	0	0	2	0	2
9	MF	(Brazil)	Élder	0	0	2	0	0	2
9	FW	(Brazil)	Macedo	0	0	1	1	0	2
9	MF	(Brazil)	Messias	2	0	0	0	0	2
9	MF	(Brazil)	Róbson Luís	2	0	0	0	0	2
9	DF	(Brazil)	Ronaldão	0	1	0	1	0	2
10	FW	(Brazil)	Adiel	0	0	0	0	1	1
10	FW	(Colombia)	Aristizábal	1	0	0	0	0	1
10	DF	(Brazil)	Athirson	1	0	0	0	0	1
10	DF	(Brazil)	Baiano	1	0	0	0	0	1
10	MF	(Brazil)	Bechara	1	0	0	0	0	1
10	MF	(Brazil)	Fernandes	1	0	0	0	0	1
10	DF	(Brazil)	Gustavo Nery	1	0	0	0	0	1
10	MF	(Japan)	Maezono	1	0	0	0	0	1
10	DF	(Brazil)	Sandro	0	0	0	1	0	1

Source: Match reports in Competitive matches

== Transfers ==
=== In ===
Pos.	Name	Moving from	Source	Notes
MAN	(Brazil) Émerson Leão	Atlético Mineiro		
MF	(Brazil) Jorginho	Atlético Mineiro		
DF	(Brazil) Argel	(Japan) Verdy Kawasaki		
FW	(Brazil) Adiel	Youth system		Promoted
ST	(Brazil) Viola	Palmeiras		
MF	(Brazil) Claudiomiro	Coritiba		On loan
MF	(Brazil) Lúcio	Flamengo		On loan
LB	(Brazil) Athirson	Flamengo		On loan
MF	(Brazil) Fumagalli	Youth system		Promoted
FW	(Brazil) Alessandro	(Japan) Júbilo Iwata		Loan return
MF	(Brazil) Fernandes	Corinthians de Presidente Prudente		On loan
MF	(Brazil) Arinélson	Flamengo		Loan return
FW	(Colombia) Aristizábal	São Paulo		On loan
MF	(Brazil) Messias	Madureira		On loan
MF	(Japan) Maezono	(Japan) Verdy Kawasaki		On loan
MF	(Brazil) Bechara	Ceará		
MF	(Brazil) Róbson Luís	Bahia		On loan

=== Out ===
Pos.	Name	Moving to	Source	Notes
MF	(Brazil) João Santos	Coritiba		
MAN	(Brazil) Vanderlei Luxemburgo	Corinthians		
DF	(Brazil) Cássio	Guarani		
FW	(Brazil) Camanducaia	Guarani		On loan
MF	(Brazil) Alexandre	Portuguesa		
MF	(Brazil) Marcelo Passos	Inter de Limeira		On loan
DF	(Brazil) Marcos Adriano	Inter de Limeira		On loan
FW	(Brazil) Macedo	Coritiba		On loan
MF	(Brazil) Marcos Assunção	Flamengo		On loan
FW	(Brazil) Caio	Flamengo		On loan
MF	(Brazil) Arinélson	Flamengo		On loan
DF	(Brazil) Ronaldão	Coritiba		
FW	(Brazil) Müller	Cruzeiro		
GK	(Brazil) Edinho	Ponte Preta		On loan
MF	(Brazil) Caíco	Atlético Paranaense		On loan
MF	(Brazil) Arinélson	Paraná		On loan
FW	(Paraguay) Báez	(Saudi Arabia) Al Hilal		
DF	(Brazil) Dutra	América Mineiro		On loan
MF	(Brazil) Fumagalli	(Japan) Verdy Kawasaki		On loan
DF	(Brazil) Daniel	(Japan) Verdy Kawasaki		On loan
MF	(Brazil) Marcelo Passos	(United Arab Emirates) Ras Al Khaimah		On loan

== Friendlies ==
10 May Friendly	Jamaica	3 – 2	Santos	Kingston, Jamaica
	Gardner 9'; Hall 39'; Goodison 66'	Report	24' Lúcio; 35' Jorginho	Stadium: Independence Park; Attendance: 25,000; Referee: Hughil Thompson

10 July Friendly	Santos	5 – 1	Portuguesa	Santos
	Ânderson Lima 30'; Viola 55', 62', 72'; Fernandes 90+1'	Report	82' Simão	Stadium: Vila Belmiro; Attendance: 525; Referee: Romildo Correia

25 August Joan Gamper Trophy	Barcelona (Spain)	2 – 2 (5–4 p)	Santos	Barcelona, Spain
	Rivaldo 39'; Figo 41'	Report	32' Ânderson Lima; 47' Adiel	Stadium: Camp Nou; Attendance: 25,000; Referee: Juan Ansuategui Roca
	Penalties
	Óscar (penalty missed); Nadal (penalty scored); Figo (penalty scored); Roger (penalty scored); Sergi (penalty missed); Zenden (penalty scored); Luis Enrique (penalty scored)		(penalty missed) Sandro; (penalty missed) Argel; (penalty scored) Narciso; (penalty scored) Fernandes; (penalty scored) Ânderson Lima; (penalty scored) Élder; (penalty missed) Claudiomiro

27 August Friendly	Roma (Italy)	2 – 3	Santos	Rome, Italy
	Bartelt 57', 82'	Report	30' Ânderson Lima; 50', 54' Aristizábal	Stadium: Stadio Olimpico; Attendance: 61,509; Referee: Ceccarini di Livorno

== Competitions ==
=== Campeonato Brasileiro ===
==== Results summary ====
Overall								Home						Away					
Pld	W	D	L	GF	GA	GD	Pts	W	D	L	GF	GA	GD	W	D	L	GF	GA	GD
29	14	9	6	55	37	+18	51	9	5	1	33	15	+18	5	4	5	22	22	0

Source: Acervo Santista

==== First stage ====
Pos	Team	Pld	W	D	L	GF	GA	GD	Pts	Qualification or relegation
2	Palmeiras	23	14	3	6	46	32	+14	45	Qualified to Quarterfinals
3	Coritiba	23	11	9	3	32	26	+6	42	Qualified to Quarterfinals
4	Santos	23	11	8	4	46	29	+17	41	Qualified to Quarterfinals
5	Sport Recife	23	12	4	7	34	22	+12	40	Qualified to Quarterfinals
6	Portuguesa	23	11	7	5	44	34	+10	40	Qualified to Quarterfinals

===== Matches =====
26 July 1	Santos	2 – 0	Bragantino	Santos
16:00	Claudiomiro 19'; Viola 45+1'	Report		Stadium: Vila Belmiro; Attendance: 7,192; Referee: Alexandre Barreto

29 July 2	Santos	1 – 1	Atlético Paranaense	Santos
15:30	Viola 86' (pen.)	Report	64' Lucas	Stadium: Vila Belmiro; Attendance: 6,554; Referee: Dacildo Mourão

2 August 3	Cruzeiro	1 – 2	Santos	Belo Horizonte
17:00	Müller 45'	Report	50' Viola; 90+2' Baiano	Stadium: Mineirão; Attendance: 13,367; Referee: Antônio Pereira da Silva

9 August 4	Vitória	1 – 3	Santos	Salvador
17:00	Agnaldo 89'	Report	58', 69' Viola; 73' Lúcio	Stadium: Barradão; Attendance: 10,551; Referee: Jorge dos Santos Travassos

15 August 5	Santos	1 – 0	Palmeiras	Santos
16:00	Argel 16'	Report		Stadium: Vila Belmiro; Attendance: 12,000; Referee: Cláudio Vinícius Cerdeira

19 August 6	Santos	4 – 4	Atlético Mineiro	Santos
15:30	Lúcio 60'; Aristizábal 75'; Viola 78' (pen.); Claudiomiro 88'	Report	25' Marques; 33', 54' (pen.), 73' (pen.) Valdir	Stadium: Vila Belmiro; Attendance: 9,062; Referee: Luciano Augusto Teotônio de Almeida

23 August 7	São Paulo	1 – 3	Santos	São Paulo
17:00	Dodô 49'	Report	58' Lúcio; 69' Jorginho; 90+3' Athirson	Stadium: Morumbi; Attendance: 20,988; Referee: Sidrack Marinho dos Santos

30 August 8	Santos	2 – 0	Internacional	Santos
16:00	Viola 32'; Lúcio 42'	Report		Stadium: Vila Belmiro; Attendance: 13,206; Referee: Wilson de Souza Mendonça

2 September 9	Guarani	1 – 1	Santos	Campinas
15:30	Robson Ponte 83'	Report	40' Ânderson Lima	Stadium: Brinco de Ouro; Attendance: 6,741; Referee: Jorge dos Santos Travassos

6 September 10	Santos	0 – 0	Sport Recife	Santos
16:00		Report		Stadium: Vila Belmiro; Attendance: 15,080; Referee: Carlos Eugênio Simon

13 September 11	Grêmio	3 – 2	Santos	Porto Alegre
16:00	Clóvis 14'; Itaqui 29'; Ronaldinho 52'	Report	17' Narciso; 67' Alessandro	Stadium: Olímpico; Attendance: 21,977; Referee: Luciano Augusto Teotônio de Almeida

16 September 12	Juventude	1 – 2	Santos	Caxias do Sul
15:30	Flávio 29'	Report	12' (pen.) Viola; 71' Claudiomiro	Stadium: Alfredo Jaconi; Attendance: 4,418; Referee: Antônio Pereira da Silva

20 September 13	Santos	4 – 1	Flamengo	Santos
17:00	Viola 20', 83' (pen.), 90+1'; Eduardo Marques 54'	Report	10' Romário	Stadium: Vila Belmiro; Attendance: 15,904; Referee: Sidrack Marinho

27 September 14	Corinthians	0 – 2	Santos	São Paulo
17:00		Report	24', 54' (pen.) Viola	Stadium: Morumbi; Attendance: 48,537; Referee: Wilson de Souza Mendonça

30 September 15	Santos	4 – 0	Ponte Preta	Santos
15:30	Eduardo Marques 41'; Ânderson Lima 59'; Lúcio 76'; Gustavo Nery 85'	Report		Stadium: Vila Belmiro; Attendance: 4,486; Referee: Fabiano Gonçalves

3 October 16	Coritiba	1 – 1	Santos	Curitiba
16:00	Gélson Baresi 79'	Report	66' Viola	Stadium: Couto Pereira; Attendance: 20,979; Referee: Carlos Eugênio Simon

11 October 17	Vasco da Gama	3 – 1	Santos	Rio de Janeiro
16:20	Ramon 16'; Juninho Pernambucano 30'; Felipe 81'	Report	68' Messias	Stadium: São Januário; Attendance: 7,650; Referee: Sidrack Marinho dos Santos

15 October 18	Santos	3 – 3	América Mineiro	Santos
21:00	Viola 1', 70' (pen.); Messias 83'	Report	21' Dimba; 67' Jean; 75' Dutra	Stadium: Vila Belmiro; Attendance: 6,151; Referee: Jamir Carlos Garcez

18 October 19	Santos	1 – 1	Portuguesa	Santos
17:00	Maezono 67'	Report	77' Aílton	Stadium: Vila Belmiro; Attendance: 12,013; Referee: Carlos Eugênio Simon

24 October 20	Santos	1 – 2	Paraná	Santos
17:00	Ânderson Lima 13'	Report	55' Raudnei; 58' Cairo	Stadium: Vila Belmiro; Attendance: 8,673; Referee: Wilson de Souza Mendonça

28 October 21	América de Natal	2 – 2	Santos	Natal
21:45	Zezinho 21'; Carioca 40' (pen.)	Report	46' Fernandes; 52' Alessandro	Stadium: Machadão; Referee: Luciano Augusto Teotônio de Almeida

1 November 22	Santos	3 – 1	Goiás	Santos
17:00	Narciso 15'; Alessandro 32'; Bechara 83'	Report	77' Ranielli	Stadium: Vila Belmiro; Attendance: 11,832; Referee: Carlos Eugênio Simon

12 November 23	Botafogo	2 – 1	Santos	Niterói
16:00	Túlio 32'; Jean 62' (o.g.)	Report	40' Viola	Stadium: Caio Martins; Attendance: 433; Referee: Márcio Rezende de Freitas

==== Quarter-finals ====
15 November First Leg	Sport Recife	3 – 1	Santos	Recife
18:30	Robson 65'; Wallace 68'; Lima Sergipano 90+4' (pen.)	Report	90+15' Argel	Stadium: Ilha do Retiro; Attendance: 11,295; Referee: Luciano Augusto Teotônio de Almeida

21 November Second Leg	Santos	2 – 1	Sport Recife	Santos
16:00	Eduardo Marques 32'; Róbson Luís 75'	Report	61' Robson	Stadium: Vila Belmiro; Attendance: 25,229; Referee: Jorge dos Santos Travassos

25 November Third Leg	Santos	3 – 0 (6 – 4 agg.)	Sport Recife	Santos
21:40	Alessandro 24'; Viola 50', 90+3'	Report		Stadium: Vila Belmiro; Attendance: 25,229; Referee: Cláudio Vinícius Cerdeira

==== Semi-finals ====
29 November First Leg	Santos	2 – 1	Corinthians	Santos
18:30	Róbson Luís 33'; Viola 81'	Report	1' Gamarra	Stadium: Vila Belmiro; Referee: Sidrack Marinho dos Santos

6 December Second Leg	Corinthians	2 – 0	Santos	São Paulo
18:30	Marcelinho Carioca 27' (pen.); Edílson 60'	Report		Stadium: Pacaembu; Attendance: 37,370; Referee: Francisco Dacildo Mourão

9 December Third Leg	Corinthians	1 – 1 (4 – 3 agg.)	Santos	São Paulo
21:40	Edílson 56'	Report	41' Viola	Stadium: Pacaembu; Attendance: 37,370; Referee: Sidrack Marinho dos Santos

=== Copa do Brasil ===
==== First round ====
20 January First leg	Villa Nova	3 – 4	Santos	Nova Lima
21:40	Kal Baiano 8'; Sargento 13'; Marcos Assunção 27' (o.g.)	Report	7' Müller; 16', 51' Jorginho; 88' Macedo	Stadium: Castor Cifuentes; Attendance: 3,735; Referee: Jamir Garcez

6 February Second leg	Santos	2 – 2 (6–5 agg.)	Villa Nova	Santos
20:30	Jorginho 16'; Élder 37'	Report	44' Adão; 70' André	Stadium: Vila Belmiro; Attendance: 4,615; Referee: José Roberto Rach

==== Second round ====
19 February First leg	Goiás	2 – 5	Santos	Goiânia
21:40	Dill 61'; Luís Paulo 90'	Report	8' Caio; 16', 70' (pen.) Ânderson Lima; 31', 64' Müller	Stadium: Serra Dourada; Attendance: 7,968; Referee: César Gilberto Pastro

==== Third round ====
24 March First leg	Bahia	3 – 3	Santos	Salvador
21:40	Branco 57'; Róbson Luís 59'; Marquinhos 84' (pen.)	Report	13', 36', 77' Marcos Assunção	Stadium: Fonte Nova; Attendance: 23,673; Referee: Jorge Travassos

23 April Second leg	Santos	5 – 2 (8–5 agg.)	Bahia	Santos
21:40	Müller 11'; Argel 54'; Viola 64', 69', 77'	Report	21', 27' Róbson Luís	Stadium: Vila Belmiro; Attendance: 8,733; Referee: Reinaldo Ribas

==== Quarter-finals ====
5 May First leg	Santos	1 – 0	Paraná	Santos
21:40	Viola 39'	Report		Stadium: Vila Belmiro; Attendance: 5,685; Referee: Cláudio Vinícius Cerdeira

14 May Second leg	Paraná	0 – 1 (0 – 2 agg.)	Santos	Curitiba
21:35		Report	56' Argel	Stadium: Vila Capanema; Attendance: 8,883; Referee: Francisco Dacildo Mourão

==== Semi-finals ====
19 May First leg	Palmeiras	1 – 1	Santos	São Paulo
21:40	Oséas 57'	Report	17' Élder	Stadium: Palestra Itália; Attendance: 23,398; Referee: Wilson de Souza Mendonça

23 May Second leg	Santos	2 – 2 (3 – 3 agg.)	Palmeiras	Santos
16:00	Viola 2'; Argel 90+2'	Report	9' Oséas; 52' Darci	Stadium: Vila Belmiro; Attendance: 21,680; Referee: Antônio Pereira da Silva

=== Campeonato Paulista ===
==== Second stage ====
===== Group 4 =====
Pos	Team	Pld	W	D	L	GF	GA	GD	Pts	Qualification or relegation
1	São Paulo (A)	10	8	1	1	31	10	+21	25	Qualified to Semifinals
2	Portuguesa (A)	10	5	3	2	20	13	+7	18	Qualified to Semifinals
3	Santos (E)	10	4	2	4	23	14	+9	14	
4	Matonense (E)	10	4	1	5	18	21	−3	13	
5	Rio Branco (E)	10	3	2	5	17	30	−13	11	
6	São José (E)	10	0	3	7	10	31	−21	3	

Updated to match(es) played on 12 April 1998. Source: RSSSF.com
Rules for classification: 1) points; 2) goal difference; 3) number of goals scored.
(A) Advance to a further round; (E) Eliminated

===== Matches =====
7 March 1	Santos	2 – 3	São Paulo	Santos
20:30	Ronaldão 31'; Müller 62'	Report	7' Carlos Miguel; 49' Fabiano; 57' Denílson	Stadium: Vila Belmiro; Attendance: 13,689; Referee: Carlos Eugênio Simon

11 March 2	São José	1 – 1	Santos	São José dos Campos
20:30	Piá 70'	Report	58' Caíco	Stadium: Martins Pereira; Attendance: 8,236; Referee: Wilson de Souza Mendonça

14 March 3	Rio Branco	2 – 1	Santos	Americana
16:00	Narcizio 45+1', 45+2'	Report	70' (pen.) Narciso	Stadium: Décio Vitta; Attendance: 6,060; Referee: Antônio Pereira da Silva

18 March 4	Santos	6 – 2	Matonense	Santos
20:30	Jorginho 34'; Caíco 37'; Marcos Assunção 41'; Müller 59', 76'; Eduardo Marques 89'	Report	20' Cristiano; 84' Ranielli	Stadium: Vila Belmiro; Attendance: 5,530; Referee: Alfredo dos Santos Loebeling

21 March 5	Portuguesa	0 – 0	Santos	São Paulo
20:30		Report		Stadium: Canindé; Referee: Luciano Augusto de Almeida

28 March 6	São Paulo	2 – 1	Santos	São Paulo
20:30	Rogério Ceni 30'; França 72'	Report	29' Lúcio Bala	Stadium: Morumbi; Attendance: 24,115; Referee: Wilson de Souza Mendonça

1 April 7	Santos	5 – 0	São José	Santos
20:30	Lúcio 4'; Caíco 75'; Narciso 82'; Eduardo Marques 86'; Müller 89'	Report		Stadium: Vila Belmiro; Attendance: 4,768; Referee: Flávio de Carvalho

4 April 8	Santos	4 – 1	Rio Branco	Santos
16:00	Müller 2', 7', 45'; Jorginho 38'	Report	33' Batistinha	Stadium: Vila Belmiro; Attendance: 6,603; Referee: Antônio Cláudio Perin

8 April 9	Matonense	1 – 0	Santos	Matão
15:00	Denys 68'	Report		Stadium: Hudson Buck Ferreira; Referee: Edílson Pereira de Carvalho

11 April 10	Santos	3 – 2	Portuguesa	Santos
20:30	Viola 8'; Argel 74'; Müller 90+3'	Report	55' Leandro Amaral; 69' Carlinhos	Stadium: Vila Belmiro; Attendance: 8,073; Referee: Cláudio Vinícius Cerdeira

=== Torneiro Rio-São Paulo ===
==== Group stage ====
Group B
Pos	Team	Pld	W	D	L	GF	GA	GD	Pts
1	Santos	6	3	3	0	12	7	+5	12
2	São Paulo	6	1	4	1	8	8	0	7
3	Fluminense	6	1	3	2	9	10	−1	6
4	Flamengo	6	0	4	2	6	10	−4	4

Updated to match(es) played on 14 February 1999. Source:

===== Matches =====
22 January 1	Santos	2 – 2	Fluminense	Santos
21:40	Báez 48'; Jorginho 59'	Report	36' Rôni; 71' Cadu	Stadium: Vila Belmiro; Attendance: 8,117; Referee: Álvaro Quelhas

28 January 2	Flamengo	0 – 2	Santos	Rio de Janeiro
21:40		Report	12' Báez; 45+1' Jorginho	Stadium: Maracanã; Attendance: 9,953; Referee: Paulo César de Oliveira

31 January 3	Santos	1 – 1	São Paulo	Ribeirão Preto
16:00	Macedo 81'	Report	45+2' (pen.) Serginho	Stadium: Santa Cruz; Attendance: 16,886; Referee: Álvaro Quelhas

3 February 4	Fluminense	2 – 3	Santos	Rio de Janeiro
21:40	Rôni 17'; Magno Alves 81'	Report	63' Jorginho; 84' Sandro; 89' (pen.) Ânderson Lima	Stadium: Maracanã; Attendance: 6,010; Referee: Alfredo dos Santos Loebeling

11 February 5	Santos	3 – 1	Flamengo	Santos
21:40	Caio 6', 36'; Jorginho 28'	Report	57' Fabiano	Stadium: Vila Belmiro; Attendance: 4,405; Referee: Reinaldo Ribas

14 February 6	São Paulo	1 – 1	Santos	Presidente Prudente
16:00	Dutra 57' (o.g.)	Report	30' Caíco	Stadium: Eduardo José Farah; Attendance: 14,800; Referee: Jorge dos Santos Travassos

==== Knockout stage ====
===== Semi-finals =====
17 February First leg	Botafogo	0 – 0	Santos	Rio de Janeiro
21:40		Report		Stadium: Maracanã; Attendance: 2,532; Referee: Oscar Roberto Godói

25 February Second leg	Santos	2 – 2 (2–2 agg.) (3–4 p)	Botafogo	São Paulo
21:40	Marcos Assunção 64'; Ronaldão 67'	Report	17' Túlio; 61' Djair	Stadium: Pacaembu; Attendance: 17,693; Referee: Reinaldo Ribas
	Penalties
	Ânderson Lima (penalty missed); Marcos Assunção (penalty scored); Narciso (penalty scored); Sandro (penalty scored); Jorginho (penalty missed)		(penalty scored) Bebeto; (penalty scored) Gonçalves; (penalty missed) França; (penalty scored) Jorge Antônio; (penalty scored) Jorge Luiz

=== Copa CONMEBOL ===
==== Round of 16 ====
15 July First leg	Santos (Brazil)	2 – 1	(Colombia) Once Caldas	Santos
20:30	Narciso 3'; Viola 67'	Report	59' (pen.) Valentierra	Stadium: Vila Belmiro; Attendance: 2,391; Referee: Ricardo Grance (Paraguay)

21 July Second leg	Once Caldas (Colombia)	2 – 1 (3–3 agg.) (2–3 p)	(Brazil) Santos	Manizales
22:40	Valentierra 21' (pen.); Padilla 55'	Report	8' Jorginho	Stadium: Palogrande; Attendance: 20,311; Referee: Paolo Borgosano (Venezuela)
	Penalties
	Valentierra (penalty missed); Quizena (penalty missed); Villegas (penalty missed); Padilla (penalty scored); Henao (penalty scored); Otero (penalty missed)		(penalty missed) Narciso; (penalty scored) Argel; (penalty missed) Fernandes; (penalty missed) Élder; (penalty scored) Athirson; (penalty scored) Ânderson Lima

==== Quarter-finals ====
5 August First leg	LDU (Ecuador)	2 – 2	(Brazil) Santos	Quito
21:15	Morales 19', 24'	Report	37' Jorginho; 73' Lúcio	Stadium: Casa Blanca; Attendance: 20,000; Referee: Felipe Russi (Colombia)

11 August Second leg	Santos (Brazil)	3 – 0 (5–2 agg.)	(Ecuador) LDU	Santos
20:30	Claudiomiro 54'; Viola 69', 82'	Report		Stadium: Vila Belmiro; Attendance: 4,731; Referee: Rene Marcelo Ortube (Bolivia)

==== Semi-finals ====
9 September First leg	Santos (Brazil)	0 – 0	(Brazil) Sampaio Corrêa	Santos
20:30		Report		Stadium: Vila Belmiro; Attendance: 2,171; Referee: Luciano Almeida

24 September Second leg	Sampaio Corrêa (Brazil)	1 – 5 (1–5 agg.)	(Brazil) Santos	São Luís
20:30	Ivan 32'	Report	39' Lúcio; 45+4' Argel; 46' Eduardo Marques; 65' Adiel; 69' Viola	Stadium: Castelão; Attendance: 95,720; Referee: Francisco Dacildo Mourão Albuquerque

==== Finals ====
7 October First leg	Santos (Brazil)	1 – 0	(Argentina) Rosario Central	Santos
20:30	Claudiomiro 73'	Report		Stadium: Vila Belmiro; Attendance: 14,715; Referee: José Luiz da Rosa (Uruguay)

21 October Second leg	Rosario Central (Argentina)	0 – 0 (0–1 agg.)	(Brazil) Santos	Rosario
22:10		Report		Stadium: Gigante de Arroyito; Attendance: 50,000; Referee: Ubaldo Aquino (Paraguay)
