= Claudiomiro (footballer, born 1971) =

Brazilian footballer

Personal information
- Full name: Claudiomiro Salenave Santiago
- Date of birth: 25 August 1971 (age 55)
- Place of birth: Santana do Livramento, Brazil
- Height: 1.80 m (5 ft 11 in)
- Position: Centre back

Senior career*
Years	Team	Apps	(Gls)
1987–1993	Grêmio Santanense	104	(9)
1994–1998	Coritiba	179	(22)
1998–2001	Santos	101	(9)
2001–2004	Grêmio	91	(2)
2005	Vitória	25	(3)

Managerial career
- 2008: Mogi Mirim (assistant)
- 2008–2009: Guaratinguetá (assistant)
- 2009: Caxias (assistant)
- 2009: Campinense (assistant)
- 2010: São José-RS (assistant)
- 2010: Criciúma (assistant)
- 2011: Guarani (assistant)
- 2011: Botafogo-SP (assistant)
- 2011: Caxias (assistant)
- 2011: Brasiliense (assistant)
- 2011: Oeste (assistant)
- 2012: Joinville (assistant)
- 2012: Figueirense (assistant)
- 2013: Red Bull Brasil (assistant)
- 2013: América de Natal (assistant)
- 2015–2016: Joinville (assistant)
- 2020: Taubaté (assistant)
- 2020–2021: Santos U17 (assistant)
- 2022: Santos U20 (assistant)
- 2022–2023: Santos (assistant)
- 2023: Santos (interim)
- 2024: Santos U20 (assistant)
- 2025: Paraná (assistant)
- * Club domestic league appearances and goals

Claudiomiro Salenave Santiago (born 25 August 1971), known simply as Claudiomiro, is a Brazilian football coach and former player who played mainly as a central defender.

Claudiomiro began his career with Grêmio Santanense, and later represented Coritiba, Santos, Grêmio and Vitória. He subsequently moved to coaching, acting mainly as an assistant manager.

== Playing career ==
Born in Santana do Livramento, Rio Grande do Sul, Claudiomiro made his senior debut with hometown side Grêmio Santanense on 12 April 1987, coming on as a substitute in a 6–2 Campeonato Gaúcho Segunda Divisão home win over Brasil de Quaraí, at the age of just 15. He began his career as an attacking midfielder, being later moved to the defensive midfield and then central defender positions.

Claudiomiro soon established himself as a regular starter for Santanense, helping in their promotion to the Campeonato Gaúcho in 1991. For the 1994 season, he signed for Coritiba.

Claudiomiro immediately became a starter for Coxa, helping in their promotion to the Série A in 1995. In March 1998, after scoring a career-best ten goals the previous season, he joined Santos.

Claudiomiro made his debut for Peixe on 28 March 1998, starting and being sent off in a 2–1 Campeonato Paulista away loss against São Paulo. Despite that, he was a regular starter for the side during his three-year spell, scoring the only goal of the club in the 1998 Copa CONMEBOL Finals.

On 13 July 2001, Claudiomiro was transferred to Grêmio for a fee of R$ 1 million. He played for the club until 2004, and retired in 2005 after playing for Vitória.

== Post-playing career ==
After retiring, Claudiomiro became an assistant of Argel Fuchs (his teammate during his period at Santos), working at Mogi Mirim, Guaratinguetá, Caxias (two stints), Campinense, São José-RS, Criciúma, Guarani, Botafogo-SP, Brasiliense, Oeste, Joinville, Figueirense, Red Bull Brasil and América de Natal. On 13 February 2015, he returned to Joinville, again as an assistant.

In 2020, Claudiomiro was named Ivan Izzo's assistant at Taubaté. He returned to his former side Santos shortly after, being named assistant of Élder Campos at the under-17 team.

In 2022, when Élder was named manager of the under-20s for the year's Copa São Paulo de Futebol Júnior, Claudiomiro was also promoted to the squad as an assistant; he later continued to work in the team as an assistant of Orlando Ribeiro. On 3 August of that year, after Serginho Chulapa left the coaching staff of the first team, Claudiomiro became the side's new permanent assistant manager.

Claudiomiro was also an interim head coach of Santos during a 3–2 home loss against Flamengo in May 2023, after Odair Hellmann was sacked.

== Career statistics ==
Club	Season	League			State League		Cup		Continental		Other		Total	
Club	Season	Division	Apps	Goals	Apps	Goals	Apps	Goals	Apps	Goals	Apps	Goals	Apps	Goals
Grêmio Santanense	1987	Gaúcho 2ª Divisão	—		1	0	—		—		—		1	0
Grêmio Santanense	1988	Gaúcho 2ª Divisão	—		0	0	—		—		—		0	0
Grêmio Santanense	1989	Gaúcho 2ª Divisão	—		6	0	—		—		—		6	0
Grêmio Santanense	1990	Gaúcho 2ª Divisão	—		16	1	—		—		—		16	1
Grêmio Santanense	1991	Gaúcho 2ª Divisão	—		20	2	—		—		—		20	2
Grêmio Santanense	1992	Gaúcho	—		23	2	—		—		—		23	2
Grêmio Santanense	1993	Gaúcho	—		38	4	—		—		—		38	4
Grêmio Santanense	Total		—		104	9	—		—		—		104	9
Coritiba	1994	Série B	15	0	23	3	—		—		—		38	3
Coritiba	1995	Série B	26	3	27	3	—		—		—		53	6
Coritiba	1996	Série A	18	1	25	3	4	1	—		—		47	5
Coritiba	1997	Série A	21	5	17	4	4	1	—		—		42	10
Coritiba	1998	Série A	0	0	7	0	2	0	—		—		9	0
Coritiba	Total		80	9	99	13	10	2	—		—		189	24
Santos	1998	Série A	21	3	4	0	0	0	7 (Note: Appearance(s) in Copa CONMEBOL)	2	0	0	32	5
Santos	1999	Série A	17	0	11	1	3	0	—		11 (Note: Nine appearances in Torneio Rio – São Paulo, two appearances in Seletiva para a Libertadores)	0	42	1
Santos	2000	Série A	18	2	17	2	7	1	—		4 (Note: Appearance(s) in Torneio Rio – São Paulo)	0	46	5
Santos	2001	Série A	0	0	13	1	2	0	—		6	1	21	2
Santos	Total		56	5	45	4	12	1	7	2	21	1	141	13
Grêmio	2001	Série A	5	0	—		—		2 (Note: Appearance(s) in Copa Mercosur)	0	—		7	0
Grêmio	2002	Série A	20	0	2	0	—		9 (Note: Appearance(s) in Copa Libertadores)	1	13 (Note: Ten appearances and one goal in Copa Sul-Minas, three appearances in Copa dos Campeões)	1	44	2
Grêmio	2003	Série A	19	0	5	0	—		11 (Note: Ten appearances and two goals in Copa Libertadores, one appearance in Copa Sudamericana)	2	—		35	2
Grêmio	2004	Série A	32	1	8	1	5	2	2 (Note: Appearance(s) in Copa Sudamericana)	0	—		47	4
Grêmio	Total		76	1	15	1	5	2	24	3	13	1	133	8
Vitória	2005	Série B	12	1	9	2	4	0	—		—		25	3
Career total			224	16	272	29	31	5	31	5	34	2	592	57

== Coaching statistics ==
As of 27 June 2023

Coaching record by team and tenure
Team	Nat	From	To	Record								Ref
Team	Nat	From	To	G	W	D	L	GF	GA	GD	Win %	Ref
Santos (interim)	(Brazil)	25 June 2023	25 June 2023	1	0	0	1	2	3	−1	0.00	
Total				1	0	0	1	2	3	−1	0.00	—

== Honours ==
Santos

- Copa CONMEBOL: 1999

Vitória

- Campeonato Baiano: 2005
