= Élder Campos =

Brazilian footballer (born 1976)

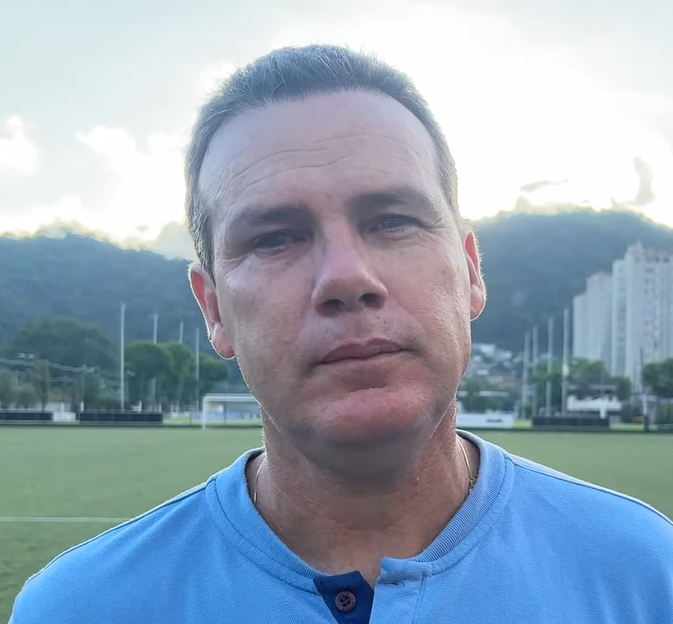
- Élder in 2025

Personal information
- Full name: Élder Alencar Machado de Campos
- Date of birth: 19 July 1976 (age 50)
- Place of birth: Presidente Prudente, Brazil
- Height: 1.86 m (6 ft 1 in)
- Position: Midfielder

Team information
- Current team: Santos U20 (head coach)

Youth career
- Dracena
- Novorizontino

Senior career*
Years	Team	Apps	(Gls)
1994–1996	Novorizontino	44	(3)
1995	→ Vasco da Gama (loan)	1	(0)
1996–2000	Santos	38	(0)
1999	→ Juventude (loan)	17	(3)
2000	→ Inter de Limeira (loan)	8	(0)
2000–2001	PAS Giannina	22	(7)
2001	Guarani	14	(2)
2002	Juventude	20	(1)
2002–2003	Kallithea	2	(0)
2003	Portuguesa		
2004	Criciúma	8	(1)
2004–2005	Sport Recife		
2005	América Mineiro	4	(0)
2006	Lombard-Pápa	14	(1)
2007–2008	Juventus-SP	16	(2)
2009	Santa Cruz	8	(1)
2010	Red Bull Brasil	24	(1)

International career
1995	Brazil U20	6	(2)

Managerial career
- 2013: Santo André U15
- 2015: Portuguesa Santista U11
- 2016–2018: Portuguesa Santista U15
- 2019: Portuguesa Santista U17
- 2020: Portuguesa Santista U20
- 2020: Portuguesa Santista
- 2020–2021: Santos U17
- 2021: Santos U20 (assistant)
- 2022: Santos U20
- 2022–2026: Santos U17
- 2026–: Santos U20
- * Club domestic league appearances and goals

Élder Alencar Machado de Campos (born 19 July 1976), known as Élder Campos or just Élder, is a Brazilian football coach and former player who played as a midfielder. He is the current head coach of Santos' under-20 team.

== Club career ==
Born in Presidente Prudente, São Paulo, Élder played for Dracena and Novorizontino as a youth. In 1995, after winning the 1994 Série C with the latter, he moved to Vasco da Gama.

On 15 August 1996, after playing the Campeonato Paulista back at Novorizontino, Élder signed for Santos. Despite being regularly used in the following years, he was unable to establish himself as an undisputed starter, and was loaned to Juventude on 23 April 1999.

Back to Santos for the 2000 season, Élder featured in two matches before moving to Inter de Limeira also on loan on 16 March of that year. In August, he moved abroad for the first time in his career, signing for PAS Giannina in Greece.

Back to Brazil, Élder spent a short period at Guarani before returning to Juventude for the 2002 campaign. In January 2003, he returned to Greece with Kallithea, but was rarely used and moved to Portuguesa.

Élder began the 2004 season at Criciúma, but moved to Sport Recife after playing in just one Série A match during the year. He left the latter in 2005, and spent a short period at América Mineiro before joining Hungarian side Lombard-Pápa.

Élder returned to his home country in 2007, signing for Juventus-SP. In December 2008, he moved to Santa Cruz, before joining Red Bull Brasil in the January 2010 and subsequently retiring after winning the Campeonato Paulista Série A3.

== International career ==
In 1995, Élder played in the 1995 FIFA World Youth Championship for the Brazil national under-20 team.

== Coaching career ==
After retiring, Élder became the head coach of Santo André's under-15 team in 2013. In September 2015, he moved to Portuguesa Santista as the head coach of the under-11s, being later in charge of the under-15s and under-17s.

On 2 June 2020, after starting the year in charge of the under-20 team, Élder was announced as head coach of the first team of Portuguesa Santista. On 16 September, after three losses in as many matches, he was sacked.

On 20 October 2020, Élder returned to Santos as head coach of the under-17 squad. In July of the following year, he became an assistant of the under-20s, before being named head coach of the category in December ahead of the 2022 Copa São Paulo de Futebol Júnior.

In March 2022, Élder returned to the under-17 side of Peixe, after the arrival of Orlando Ribeiro in the under-20s. On 24 March 2026, he returned to the under-20 squad after Vinicius Marques was promoted to the first team.

== Career statistics ==
Club	Season	League			State League		Cup		Continental		Other		Total	
Club	Season	Division	Apps	Goals	Apps	Goals	Apps	Goals	Apps	Goals	Apps	Goals	Apps	Goals
Novorizontino	1994	Série C	15	1	—		—		—		—		15	1
Novorizontino	1995	Série B	—		19	1	—		—		—		19	1
Novorizontino	1996	Paulista	—		10	1	—		—		—		10	1
Novorizontino	Total		15	1	29	2	—		—		—		44	3
Vasco da Gama (loan)	1995	Série A	1	0	—		—		—		—		1	0
Santos	1996	Série A	9	0	—		—		—		—		9	0
Santos	1997	Série A	12	0	9	0	0	0	4 (Note: Appearance(s) in Supercopa Libertadores)	1	3 (Note: Appearance(s) in Copa dos Campeões Mundiais)	0	28	1
Santos	1998	Série A	17	0	4	0	8	2	4 (Note: Appearance(s) in Copa CONMEBOL)	0	5 (Note: Appearance(s) in Torneio Rio-São Paulo)	0	38	2
Santos	1999	Série A	0	0	0	0	1	0	—		3	0	4	0
Santos	2000	Série A	0	0	0	0	0	0	—		2	0	2	0
Santos	Total		38	0	13	0	9	2	8	1	13	0	81	3
Juventude (loan)	1999	Série A	7	0	10	3	—		—		—		17	3
Inter de Limeira (loan)	2000	Copa João Havelange	—		8	0	—		—		—		8	0
PAS Giannina	2000–01	Alpha Ethniki	22	7	—		4	2	—		3 (Note: Appearance(s) in the relegation play-offs)	0	29	9
Guarani	2001	Série A	14	2	—		—		—		—		14	2
Juventude	2002	Série A	20	1	0	0	4	0	—		10 (Note: Appearance(s) in Copa Sul-Minas)	1	34	2
Kallithea	2002–03	Alpha Ethniki	2	0	—		—		—		—		2	0
Criciúma	2004	Série A	1	0	7	1	—		—		—		8	1
América Mineiro	2005	Série C	4	0	—		—		—		8 (Note: Appearance(s) in Taça Minas Gerais)	0	12	0
Lombard-Pápa	2005–06	Nemzeti Bajnokság I	14	1	—		—		—		—		14	1
Juventus-SP	2007	Série C	6	1	10	1	—		—		0	0	16	2
Juventus-SP	2008	Paulista	—		0	0	—		—		0	0	0	0
Juventus-SP	Total		6	1	10	1	—		—		0	0	16	2
Santa Cruz (loan)	2009	Série D	0	0	8	1	2	0	—		—		10	1
Red Bull Brasil	2010	Paulista A3	—		24	1	—		—		—		24	1
Career total			144	13	109	9	19	4	8	1	34	1	314	28

== Coaching statistics ==
As of 30 April 2025

Coaching record by team and tenure
Team	Nat	From	To	Record								Ref
Team	Nat	From	To	G	W	D	L	GF	GA	GD	Win %	Ref
Portuguesa Santista	(Brazil)	2 June 2020	16 September 2020	3	0	0	3	2	6	−4	0.00	
Total				3	0	0	3	2	6	−4	0.00	—

== Honours ==
=== Player ===
Novorizontino

- Campeonato Brasileiro Série C: 1994

Santos

- Torneio Rio-São Paulo: 1997
- Copa CONMEBOL: 1998

Red Bull Brasil

- Campeonato Paulista Série A3: 2010

=== Coach ===
Santos

- Campeonato Paulista Sub-17: 2024
