= Marcos Bazílio =

Brazilian footballer

Personal information
- Full name: Marcos Roberto Pereira Bazílio
- Date of birth: 18 August 1976 (age 50)
- Place of birth: São Paulo, Brazil
- Height: 1.72 m (5 ft 8 in)
- Position: Defensive midfielder

Team information
- Current team: Santos U17 (head coach)

Youth career
- 1990–1997: Santos

Senior career*
Years	Team	Apps	(Gls)
1995–2002	Santos	62	(0)
1998	→ Iraty (loan)		
2000–2001	→ Portuguesa Santista (loan)	46	(0)
2001	→ Bahia (loan)	8	(0)
2002	→ Caxias (loan)	31	(0)
2003	Gama	2	(0)
2004–2006	Avaí		
2007	Brasil de Pelotas	12	(0)
2007	Uberlândia		
2007	Sertãozinho	0	(0)
2008	União São João	18	(0)
2008	Rio Claro	0	(0)
2009	Coruripe	13	(1)
2009	Goytacaz	9	(0)
2010	Itapirense	15	(0)

International career
1993	Brazil U17		

Managerial career
- 2014–2015: Portuguesa Santista U15
- 2016–2018: Portuguesa Santista U17
- 2019–2022: Jabaquara U17
- 2023–2024: EC São Bernardo U20
- 2024–2025: EC São Bernardo
- 2025: EC São Bernardo U20
- 2025–2026: Santos U20 (assistant)
- 2026: Santos U16
- 2026–: Santos U17
- * Club domestic league appearances and goals

Marcos Roberto Pereira Bazílio (born 18 August 1976) is a Brazilian professional football coach and former player who played as a defensive midfielder. He is the current head coach of Santos' under-17 team.

== Playing career ==
Born in São Paulo, Bazílio began his career in football schools in his hometown and playing for amateur sides in Vila Guarani, Jabaquara, before being spotted by Lima in 1990 and being brought to the youth categories of Santos. He made his first team debut on 11 June 1995, coming on as a substitute in a 4–0 Campeonato Paulista home routing of XV de Piracicaba.

Bazílio returned to the under-20s in the following year, but returned to the first team in 1997. In 1998, he spent the Campeonato Paranaense on loan at Iraty, before returning to Peixe and becoming a starter as the club won the 1998 Copa CONMEBOL.

Bazílio lost his starting spot during the 1999 season, and was loaned to Portuguesa Santista in January 2000. Back to Santos after the 2001 Campeonato Paulista, he moved to Bahia also in a temporary deal along with Valdir on 27 July 2001, with Vagner moving in the opposite direction.

In 2002, Bazílio was loaned to Caxias. He played the 2003 Série B for Gama, before signing for Avaí on 27 November of that year.

On 5 January 2007, Bazílio agreed to a deal with Brasil de Pelotas. He represented Uberlândia and Sertãozinho in the remainder of the season, before playing for União São João and Rio Claro in 2008.

Bazílio played for Coruripe and Goytacaz in 2009, before moving to Itapirense for the 2010 campaign. After playing in the 2010 Campeonato Paulista Série A3, he retired.

== Coaching career ==
On 11 April 2014, Bazílio was named head coach of the under-15 team of Portuguesa Santista. He later took over the under-17s in 2016, before moving to Jabaquara in the same capacity in 2019.

In 2023, Bazílio was named in charge of EC São Bernardo's under-20 team. On 30 April 2024, he was appointed head coach of the main squad for the Copa Paulista. He was later confirmed as head coach of the side for the 2025 Campeonato Paulista Série A3 on 30 October, but only lasted three matches before being demoted back to the under-20s on 27 January 2025.

On 21 April 2025, São Bernardo announced Bazílio's departure from the club to join Santos, as an assistant of Maurício Copertino in the under-20 squad.

== Career statistics ==
Club	Season	League			State League		Cup		Continental		Other		Total	
Club	Season	Division	Apps	Goals	Apps	Goals	Apps	Goals	Apps	Goals	Apps	Goals	Apps	Goals
Santos	1995	Série A	0	0	2	0	—		0	0	0	0	2	0
Santos	1997	Série A	18	0	0	0	0	0	5 (Note: Appearance(s) in Supercopa Libertadores)	0	0	0	23	0
Santos	1998	Série A	20	0	—		3	0	4 (Note: Appearance(s) in Copa CONMEBOL)	0	1 (Note: Appearance(s) in Torneio Rio-São Paulo)	0	28	0
Santos	1999	Série A	9	0	13	0	4	0	—		12 (Note: Ten appearances in Torneio Rio-São Paulo, two appearances in Seletiva para a Libertadores)	0	38	0
Santos	Total		47	0	15	0	7	0	9	0	13	0	91	0
Portuguesa Santista (loan)	2000	Copa João Havelange	15	0	19	0	—		—		—		34	0
Portuguesa Santista (loan)	2001	Paulista	—		12	0	—		—		—		12	0
Portuguesa Santista (loan)	Total		15	0	31	0	—		—		—		46	0
Bahia (loan)	2001	Série A	8	0	—		—		—		—		8	0
Caxias (loan)	2002	Série B	23	0	8	0	0	0	—		—		31	0
Gama	2003	Série B	2	0	0	0	0	0	—		—		2	0
Avaí	2004	Série B	31	0	?	?	—		—		—		31+	0+
Avaí	2005	Série B	23	0	?	?	—		—		—		23+	0+
Avaí	2006	Série B	12	0	?	?	—		—		—		12+	0+
Avaí	Total		66	0	?	?	—		—		—		66+	0+
Brasil de Pelotas	2007	Gaúcho	—		12	0	—		—		—		12	0
Sertãozinho	2007	Série C	—		—		—		—		2 (Note: Appearance(s) in Copa Paulista)	1	2	1
União São João	2008	Paulista A2	—		18	0	—		—		—		18	0
Coruripe	2009	Alagoano	—		13	1	—		—		—		13	1
Goytacaz	2009	Carioca Série B	—		9	0	—		—		—		9	0
Itapirense	2010	Paulista A3	—		15	0	—		—		—		15	0
Career total			161	0	112+	1+	7	0	9	0	13	0	302+	1+

== Coaching statistics ==
As of 29 April 2025

Coaching record by team and tenure
Team	Nat	From	To	Record								Ref
Team	Nat	From	To	G	W	D	L	GF	GA	GD	Win %	Ref
EC São Bernardo	(Brazil)	30 April 2024	27 January 2025	13	2	5	6	11	16	−5	15.38	
Total				13	2	5	6	11	16	−5	15.38	—

== Honours ==
=== Player ===
Santos

- Copa CONMEBOL: 1998
