= Itaporanga =

Itaporanga may refer to the following places in Brazil:

- Itaporanga, Paraíba
- Itaporanga, São Paulo
- Itaporanga d'Ajuda, Sergipe

== See also ==
- Itapiranga (disambiguation)
