= Jorginho (footballer, born 1965) =

Brazilian footballer and manager

Personal information
- Full name: Jorge Luís da Silva
- Date of birth: 22 May 1965 (age 61)
- Place of birth: São Paulo, Brazil
- Position: Midfielder

Senior career*
Years	Team	Apps	(Gls)
1983–1990	Portuguesa		
1990–1992	Palmeiras		
1992	Santo André		
1993	Paysandu		
1994	Santo André		
1994	Coritiba		
1995	Santo André		
1995	Juventude		
1996	Lousano Paulista		
1997	Santo André		
1997	Atlético Mineiro		
1998–1999	Santos		
1999	Paraná		
2000	Portuguesa Santista		
2000–2002	Fluminense		
2002	Rio Branco-SP		
2002	Avaí		

International career
1990	Brazil	1	(0)

Managerial career
- 2009: Palmeiras (caretaker)
- 2010: Goiás
- 2010: Ponte Preta
- 2011–2012: Portuguesa
- 2012: Atlético Paranaense
- 2012–2013: Bahia
- 2013: Náutico
- 2014: Vitória
- 2014: Chapecoense
- 2015: Atlético Goianiense
- 2016: Portuguesa
- 2017–2018: Água Santa
- 2019: Nacional-SP
- 2020: Juventus de Jaraguá
- 2020–2021: Figueirense
- 2022: Marcílio Dias
- 2023–2024: Juventus-SP
- * Club domestic league appearances and goals

Jorge Luís da Silva (born 22 March 1965), commonly known as Jorginho or sometimes Jorginho Cantinflas, is a Brazilian professional football coach and former player who played as a midfielder.

== Career ==
Jorginho played in several clubs, like Portuguesa, Palmeiras, Coritiba, Atlético Mineiro, Santos, Fluminense. While at Santos he scored their 10,000th goal.

Began his coaching career at Palmeiras when he replace Vanderlei Luxemburgo as a caretaker coach at the 2009 Campeonato Brasileiro Série A.

On 5 September 2013, Nautico coach Jorginho resigned after just five games, all defeats, in charge of the Brazilian club.

== Honours ==
=== Player ===
Paysandu

- Campeonato Paraense: 1992

Atlético Mineiro

- Copa Conmebol: 1997

Santos

- Copa Conmebol: 1998

=== Manager ===
Portuguesa

- Campeonato Brasileiro Série B: 2011

Figueirense

- Copa Santa Catarina: 2021
