= Itapiranga =

Itapiranga may refer to two places in Brazil:

- Itapiranga, Amazonas, a municipality in the state of Amazonas
- Itapiranga, Santa Catarina, a municipality in the state of Santa Catarina

== See also ==
- Itaporanga (disambiguation)
