= 1996 in Brazilian football =

Football in Brazil
- Season: 1996

The following article presents a summary of the 1996 football (soccer) season in Brazil, which was the 95th season of competitive football in the country.

== Campeonato Brasileiro Série A ==
Quarterfinals

Team 1	Agg.	Team 2	1st leg	2nd leg
Portuguesa	3-1	Cruzeiro	3-0	0-1
Goiás	3-2	Guarani	3-1	0-1
Grêmio	3-2	Palmeiras	3-1	0-1
Atlético Mineiro	3-2	Atlético Paranaense	3-1	0-1

Semifinals

Team 1	Agg.	Team 2	1st leg	2nd leg
Portuguesa	3-2	Atlético Mineiro	1-0	2-2
Goiás	3-5	Grêmio	1-3	2-2

Final

December 11, 1996

Portuguesa	2–0	Grêmio

Morumbi

December 15, 1996

Grêmio	2–0	Portuguesa

Olímpico

Grêmio declared as the Campeonato Brasileiro champions by aggregate score of 2-2.

=== Relegation ===
The two worst placed teams, which are Fluminense and Bragantino, were relegated to the following year's second level.

== Campeonato Brasileiro Série B ==
Pos	Team	Pld	W	D	L	GF	GA	GD	Pts	Promotion	USJ	ARN	NAU	LON
1	União São João	6	3	2	1	11	8	+3	11	Promoted to Série A 1998		3–1	1–1	1–1
2	América-RN	6	3	0	3	8	12	−4	9	Promoted to Série A 1998	2–1		1–0	2–1
3	Náutico	6	2	2	2	10	6	+4	8		1–2	4–1		3–0
4	Londrina	6	1	2	3	8	11	−3	5		1–1	3–1	1–1	

União São João declared as the Campeonato Brasileiro Série B champions.

=== Promotion ===
The two best placed teams in the final stage of the competition, which are União São João and América-RN, were promoted to the following year's first level.

=== Relegation ===
The three worst placed teams in all the five groups in the first stage, which are Central, Sergipe and Goiatuba, were relegated to the following year's third level.

== Campeonato Brasileiro Série C ==
Quarterfinals

Team 1	Agg.	Team 2	1st leg	2nd leg
Nacional	0-4	Vila Nova	0-3	0-1
Botafogo-SP	3-1	Rio Branco-SP	2-0	1-1
Francana	4-4 (3-4 pen)	Figueirense	3-1	1-3
Sampaio Corrêa	4-4	Porto	4-3	1-2

Semifinals

Team 1	Agg.	Team 2	1st leg	2nd leg
Porto	3-5	Vila Nova	0-0	3-5
Figueirense	2-3	Botafogo-SP	2-0	0-3

Final

December 1, 1996

Vila Nova	2–1	Botafogo-SP

December 8, 1996

Botafogo-SP	0–1	Vila Nova

Vila Nova declared as the Campeonato Brasileiro Série C champions by aggregate score of 3-1.

=== Promotion ===
The champion and the runner-up, which are Vila Nova and Botafogo-SP, were promoted to the following year's second level.

== Copa do Brasil ==
The Copa do Brasil final was played between Cruzeiro and Palmeiras.

June 14, 1996

Cruzeiro	1–1	Palmeiras

Mineirão

June 19, 1996

Palmeiras	1–2	Cruzeiro

Parque Antártica

Cruzeiro declared as the cup champions by aggregate score of 3-2.

== State championship champions ==
State	Champion	State	Champion
Acre	Juventus-AC	Paraíba	Santa Cruz-PB
Alagoas	CSA	Paraná	Paraná
Amapá	not disputed	Pernambuco	Sport Recife
Amazonas	Nacional	Piauí	River
Bahia	Vitória	Rio de Janeiro	Flamengo
Ceará	Ceará	Rio Grande do Norte	América-RN
Distrito Federal	Guará	Rio Grande do Sul	Grêmio
Espírito Santo	Desportiva	Rondônia	Ji-Paraná
Goiás	Goiás	Roraima	Baré
Maranhão	Bacabal	Santa Catarina	Chapecoense
Mato Grosso	Mixto	São Paulo	Palmeiras
Mato Grosso do Sul	Operário	Sergipe	Sergipe
Minas Gerais	Cruzeiro	Tocantins	Gurupi
Pará	Remo		

== Youth competition champions ==
Competition	Champion
Copa Santiago de Futebol Juvenil	Grêmio
Copa São Paulo de Juniores	América-MG
Taça Belo Horizonte de Juniores	Atlético Paranaense

== Other competition champions ==
Competition	Champion
Copa dos Campeões Mundiais	São Paulo
Copa Oro	Flamengo
Copa Pernambuco	Recife
Copa Rio-Brasília	Botafogo
Copa Santa Catarina	Figueirense
Torneio Maria Quitéria	Vitória

== Brazilian clubs in international competitions ==
Team	Copa Libertadores 1996	Supercopa Sudamericana 1996	Copa CONMEBOL 1996	Recopa Sudamericana 1996
Botafogo	Round of 16	Did not qualify	Did not qualify	N/A
Bragantino	Did not qualify	Did not qualify	Quarterfinals	N/A
Corinthians	Quarterfinals	Did not qualify	Did not qualify	N/A
Cruzeiro	Did not qualify	Runner-up	Did not qualify	N/A
Flamengo	Did not qualify	Quarterfinals	Did not qualify	N/A
Fluminense	Did not qualify	Did not qualify	Round of 16	N/A
Grêmio	Semifinals	Round of 16	Did not qualify	Champions
Palmeiras	Did not qualify	Did not qualify	Round of 16	N/A
Santos	Did not qualify	Semifinals	Did not qualify	N/A
São Paulo	Did not qualify	Round of 16	Did not qualify	N/A
Vasco	Did not qualify	Did not qualify	Semifinals	N/A

== Brazil national team ==
The following table lists all the games played by the Brazil national football team in official competitions and friendly matches during 1996.

Date	Opposition	Result	Score	Brazil scorers	Competition
January 12, 1996	Canada	W	4-1	André, Caio, Sávio, Leandro Machado	Gold Cup
January 14, 1996	Honduras	W	5-0	Jamelli (2), Caio (2), Sávio	Gold Cup
January 18, 1996	United States	W	1-0	Sávio	Gold Cup
January 21, 1996	Mexico	L	0-2	-	Gold Cup
March 27, 1996	Ghana	W	8-2	Zé Maria, Sávio, André, Marques (3), Rivaldo, Luizão	International Friendly
April 24, 1996	South Africa	W	3-2	Flávio Conceição, Rivaldo, Bebeto	Nelson Mandela Challenge
May 22, 1996	Croatia	D	1-1	Sávio	International Friendly
June 26, 1996	Poland	W	3-1	Bebeto (2), Narciso	International Friendly
August 28, 1996	Russia	D	2-2	Donizete, Ronaldo	International Friendly
August 31, 1996	Netherlands	D	2-2	Giovanni, Gonçalves	International Friendly
October 16, 1996	Lithuania	W	3-1	Ronaldo (3)	International Friendly
November 13, 1996	Cameroon	W	2-0	Giovanni, Djalminha	International Friendly
December 18, 1996	Bosnia and Herzegovina	W	1-0	Ronaldo	International Friendly

== Women's football ==
=== Brazil women's national football team ===
The following table lists all the games played by the Brazil women's national football team in official competitions and friendly matches during 1996.

Date	Opposition	Result	Score	Brazil scorers	Competition
January 14, 1996	Ukraine	W	7–0	Pretinha (4), unknown (3)	Torneio do Brasil
January 16, 1996	United States	L	2–3	Sissi, Elane	Torneio do Brasil
January 18, 1996	Russia	W	4–0	unavailable	Torneio do Brasil
January 21, 1996	United States	D	1–1 (2-3 pen)	Pretinha	Torneio do Brasil
July 4, 1986	Canada	W	2–1	unavailable	International Friendly
July 21, 1986	Norway	D	2–2	Pretinha (2)	Summer Olympics
July 23, 1986	Japan	W	2–0	Kátia Cilene, Roseli	Summer Olympics
July 25, 1986	Germany	D	1–1	Sissi	Summer Olympics
July 28, 1986	China	L	2–3	Roseli, Pretinha	Summer Olympics
August 1, 1986	Norway	L	0–2	-	Summer Olympics
December 10, 1986	Scotland	W	5–0	unavailable	International Friendly
December 12, 1986	Scotland	W	6–0	unavailable	International Friendly
December 14, 1986	Scotland	W	7–1	unavailable	International Friendly

The Brazil women's national football team competed in the following competitions in 1995:

Competition	Performance
Summer Olympics	Semifinals

=== Domestic competition champions ===
Competition	Champion
Campeonato Brasileiro	Saad
Campeonato Carioca	Vasco
