= Sandro Barbosa =

Brazilian footballer

Personal information
- Full name: Sandro Barbosa Carneiro da Cunha
- Date of birth: 17 February 1973 (age 53)
- Place of birth: Recife, Brazil
- Height: 1.80 m (5 ft 11 in)
- Position: Centre-back

Youth career
- 1990–1992: Sport Recife

Senior career*
Years	Team	Apps	(Gls)
1992–1996	Sport Recife		
1996–1999	Santos		
1999	→ Botafogo (loan)		
1999–2004	Botafogo		
2005	Belenenses		
2005	→ Naval (loan)		
2005–2006	Sport Recife		
2006	Guarani		
2006–2007	Vitória		
2008	Treze		
2008–2010	Santa Cruz		

Managerial career
- 2013: Santa Cruz
- * Club domestic league appearances and goals as of 23 November 2023

Sandro Barbosa Carneiro da Cunha (born 17 February 1973), better known as Sandro Barbosa or simply Sandro, is a Brazilian former professional footballer who played as a centre-back.

== Career ==
Graduated from the youth categories of Sport Recife, he was promoted to the professional team at the age of 19, and was part of the Pernambuco champion squads of 1994 and 1996, in addition to the Copa do Nordeste. In 1996, he was hired by Santos FC, where he again won the regional title of the Rio-São Paulo Tournament, and in 1998 the CONMEBOL Cup.

At Botafogo, despite not winning any titles, he became an idol of the club due to his style of play, representing the outrage of the fans on the field. In 2004 he was traded to Portuguese football but played little, returning to Sport Recife once again. He also had spells at Vitória and Treze, until arriving at Santa Cruz, the club where he retired as a player.

== Managerial career ==
After retiring, he became Zé Teodoro technical assistant at Santa Cruz, participating in the 2011 and 2012 state championships. In 2013, he had his only experience as a head coach, again at Santa Cruz FC.

== Honours ==
Sport Recife

- Copa do Nordeste: 1994
- Campeonato Pernambucano: 1994, 1996

Santos

- Torneio Rio-São Paulo: 1997
- Copa CONMEBOL: 1998

Vitória

- Campeonato Baiano: 2007

Santa Cruz

- Copa Pernambuco: 2008
