= Fernandes (footballer, born 1978) =

Brazilian footballer (born 1978)

Personal information
- Full name: Rodrigo Fernandes Valete
- Date of birth: March 3, 1978 (age 48)
- Place of birth: Itaporanga, São Paulo, Brazil
- Height: 1.78 m (5 ft 10 in)
- Position: Attacking midfielder

Youth career
- 1997–1998: Corinthians

Senior career*
Years	Team	Apps	(Gls)
1998	Santos	8	(1)
1998	Independente-SP		
1999	Portuguesa Santista		
1999–2001	Figueirense		
2002	Palmeiras		
2002–2012	Figueirense	124	(25)
2003	→ Jeonbuk Hyundai (loan)	29	(3)
2004	→ Al-Shabab (loan)	23	(10)
2013	Red Bull Brasil		
- * Club domestic league appearances and goals

Rodrigo Fernandes Valete, better known as Fernandes (Itaporanga, March 3, 1978), is a Brazilian former footballer who played as a midfielder.

With 108 goals in 403 matches, he is the all-time leading goalscorer and the third player with the most appearances in the history of Figueirense, the club for which he played between 1999 and 2012. Throughout his fourteen seasons with the club from Santa Catarina, he won six Campeonato Catarinense titles (being elected the competition's best player twice), finished runner-up in the Copa do Brasil, and achieved promotion to the Brazilian Série A on two occasions.

He is widely regarded as the greatest idol in the history of Figueira, the club he supports.

== Career ==
Fernandes began his football career at Presidente Prudente. With a career marked by overcoming injuries, he became an idol at Figueirense FC not only for his footballing ability, but also for his character and for being the first player to surpass the mark of 100 goals for the club. He is considered by Figueira supporters to be the club's greatest idol due to the rise and brilliance of the football he displayed.

Having started his career in São Paulo state football, Fernandes joined Figueirense FC in 1999 on a temporary three-month contract. The player competed in the Campeonato Catarinense, making his debut on June 21 against Brusque at Augusto Bauer Stadium. Fernandes came off the bench to replace Perivaldo under the guidance of coach Abel Ribeiro. Played at Augusto Bauer Stadium, the match ended in a 4–0 victory for Figueirense. Fernandes scored his first goal for Figueira on July 8 in a 2–1 victory over Criciúma. After the competition ended, he attracted interest from other clubs in the state, such as Joinville, Criciúma, and Figueira's main rival, Avaí. He ultimately remained at Orlando Scarpelli (Figueirense's stadium) for the Campeonato Brasileiro Série C campaign, delivering strong performances.

In 2000, he stood out in the state championship and was elected the competition's best player. In the Yellow Module of the Copa João Havelange, he finished as the top scorer in his module, helping secure promotion to the 2001 Série B. The following year, the midfielder played a key role in the second division campaign, contributing to the club's runner-up finish and promotion to the top tier of Brazilian football. In January 2002, Palmeiras signed the player to compete in the Copa do Brasil and the Campeonato Paulista. After making only a few appearances, he returned to Figueirense.

In 2003, Fernandes transferred to South Korean football to play for Jeonbuk Hyundai Motors, where he delivered strong performances and attracted interest from other clubs. However, he returned to Figueira in 2004, standing out in the Campeonato Catarinense, the Brazilian Championship, and the Copa Sudamericana, forming a successful partnership with midfielder Sérgio Manoel and being elected the Campeonato Catarinense's best player for the second time. That same year, Fernandes moved to Arab football to play for Al-Shabab. In 2005, Fernandes returned once again to Figueira, arriving in the second half of the year and performing consistently. He remained at Figueirense in 2006, though he struggled with injuries and spent part of the season out of the starting lineup.

In 2007, fully recovered, he performed well and scored several goals in the Campeonato Catarinense and the Copa do Brasil. He was one of the team's key players during the Copa do Brasil campaign, helping the club reach the final. In the title-deciding match against Fluminense, played at Orlando Scarpelli, he began the match on the bench. Trailing 1–0 and needing an equalizer, Fernandes was brought on, but the team could not overcome the opponent and finished as runners-up.

He continued playing for the club in the remainder of the year's competitions — the Copa Sudamericana and the continuation of the Brazilian Championship. In 2008, he attracted interest from Cruzeiro and Fluminense, but rejected both offers. After the first leg of the Campeonato Catarinense final against Criciúma (which Figueira would go on to win), he endured a difficult period in his career, suffering serious injuries, spending long periods away from the pitch, and undergoing lengthy recoveries. After several surgeries, Fernandes even considered retirement.

In 2010, he scored his 95th goal for Figueirense in a match against Imbituba, becoming the club's all-time leading scorer and surpassing Calico's mark of 94 goals. He also surpassed the appearance records of other major club players such as João Carlos da Silva (335 matches) and Peçanha (303 matches), becoming the third player with the most appearances for Figueira, behind only Jaime Casagrande (430) and Pinga (483).

In 2011, in the first-leg semi final match of the first stage of the Campeonato Catarinense, played on February 20, 2011, against Joinville, Fernandes scored his 100th goal for Figueirense. He scored at the 15th minute of the first half. During the match, which ended 3–1, he scored another goal, his 101st for Figueira. He received a standing ovation from supporters at the stadium and was honored by both the fans and the club, including a banner reading "Fernan10 is 100". On the occasion, he stated: "I pursued this milestone throughout my more than 11-year journey at Figueirense. Today I can say that I am a happy and fulfilled man because of this achievement and because I was able to help Figueirense, which welcomed me warmly and which I love."

In 2012, amid financial problems and internal disputes within the board, Figueirense failed to assemble a competitive squad and was relegated to the Campeonato Brasileiro Série B. In a highly controversial move criticized by the vast majority of supporters, Fernandes was released under orders from president Wilfredo Brillinger, alongside goalkeeper Wilson, the fifth player with the most appearances for Figueira, with more than 300 matches played. The board also denied requests for a farewell match for the club idol, prompting supporters to independently organize a farewell event for the black-and-white star. The turbulent relationship between Fernandes and the Figueirense board did not end there: after not receiving part of his salary and image rights payments, the player was forced to take legal action in labor court, winning the case and obtaining a ruling ordering the club to pay the overdue amounts. The strained relationship between the club's management and the player continued, to the dissatisfaction of supporters, who wished for the player's return.

After leaving Figueirense, Fernandes signed with São Paulo club Red Bull Brasil on November 27, 2012, for the 2013 season. During the 2013 season, while dealing with injuries and still dissatisfied with his departure from Figueirense, Fernandes announced his retirement from football. Considering a future return to football in a technical or management role, the player stated plans to one day return to Figueira, but only after changes in the club's administration.

== Statistics and records at Figueirense FC ==
With 108 goals scored in 403 appearances between 1999 and 2012, Fernandes achieved several milestones and set a number of records while playing for Figueirense. Some of these records include:

All-time leading goalscorer in the club's history (108 goals scored); Top scorer for the club in the Brazilian Championship first division (17 goals); Third player with the most appearances for Figueirense (403 matches); Most editions of the Campeonato Catarinense played for the club, tied with full-back Pinga (11 editions); Most state championship titles won (6), tied with Calico.

== Individual honors ==
- Best Player of the Campeonato Catarinense: 2000 and 2004
- Top scorer of the Copa João Havelange – Yellow Module*: 2000 (equivalent to Série B)
- Thomaz Chaves Cabral Merit Medal: 2009
- King of Florianópolis: 2009
- Ney Pacheco Award: 2011
- Honorary Citizen of Florianópolis: 2012
- Municipal Sports Merit Medal – Florianópolis City Council: 2015

== Honours ==
=== As a player ===
Santos

- Torneio Rio-São Paulo: 1997
- Copa CONMEBOL: 1998

Figueirense

- Campeonato Catarinense: 1999, 2002, 2003, 2004, 2006 and 2008
- Brazilian Série B runner-up: 2001 and 2010
- Copa do Brasil runner-up: 2007

Jeonbuk Motors

- Korean FA Cup: 2003
- Korean Super Cup: 2003

=== As football director ===
Figueirense

- Campeonato Catarinense: 2018
