= Argel Fuchs =

Brazilian footballer (born 1974)

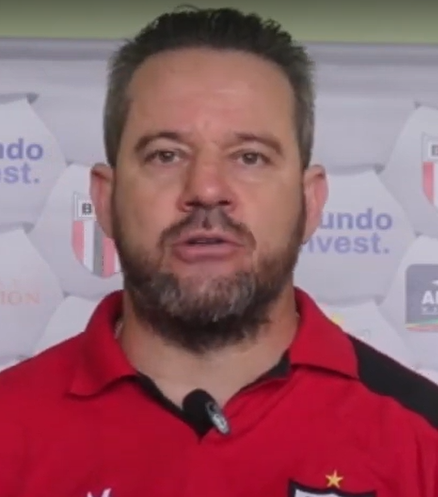
- Argel as head coach of Botafogo-SP in 2021

Personal information
- Full name: Argélico Fuchs
- Birth name: Argélico Fucks
- Date of birth: 4 September 1974 (age 52)
- Place of birth: Santa Rosa, Brazil
- Height: 1.86 m (6 ft 1 in)
- Position: Centre-back

Team information
- Current team: São José-RS (head coach)

Senior career*
Years	Team	Apps	(Gls)
1992–1995	Internacional	41	(3)
1996–1997	Verdy Kawasaki	32	(0)
1997–1998	Santos	21	(2)
1999	Porto	5	(1)
2000–2001	Palmeiras	40	(4)
2001–2004	Benfica	79	(7)
2005	Racing Santander	2	(0)
2005	Cruzeiro	9	(0)
2006	Canoas	10	(0)
2007	Zhejiang Greentown	22	(1)
Total		261	(18)

International career
1993	Brazil U20	2	(0)
1995	Brazil	1	(0)

Managerial career
- 2008: Mogi Mirim
- 2008–2009: Guaratinguetá
- 2009: Caxias
- 2009: Campinense
- 2010: São José-RS
- 2010: Criciúma
- 2011: Guarani
- 2011: Botafogo-SP
- 2011: Caxias
- 2011: Brasiliense
- 2011: Oeste
- 2012: Joinville
- 2012: Figueirense
- 2012: Avaí
- 2013: Red Bull Brasil
- 2013: América de Natal
- 2013: Criciúma
- 2014: Portuguesa
- 2014–2015: Figueirense
- 2015–2016: Internacional
- 2016: Figueirense
- 2016–2017: Vitória
- 2017: Goiás
- 2018: Criciúma
- 2018–2019: Coritiba
- 2019: CSA
- 2019–2020: Ceará
- 2020: CSA
- 2021: Botafogo-SP
- 2021–2022: Alverca
- 2023: Chapecoense
- 2023: ABC
- 2024: Caxias
- 2025: Paraná
- 2026–: São José-RS
- * Club domestic league appearances and goals

Argélico "Argel" Fuchs (born Argélico Fucks; 4 September 1974) is a Brazilian former professional footballer who played as a central defender. He is the current head coach of São José-RS.

His professional career spanned 15 years, during which he was mainly associated with Benfica and Internacional. He also played in Japan, Spain and China, and appeared in one international match for Brazil.

Fuchs started working as a coach in 2008, going on to be in charge of more than 25 clubs.

== Club career ==
Known simply as Argel as a player, he was born in Santa Rosa, Rio Grande do Sul. He began his career with Internacional, Santos and Palmeiras, with a brief stint in Japan in between and an unsuccessful spell at Portugal's Porto, which finished after a serious run-in with the board of directors and prompted his Brazil return.

In early June 2001, Argel returned to Portugal with Benfica, which he helped win the Primeira Liga in his fourth season and the Supertaça Cândido de Oliveira, the former after an 11-year drought. The player contributed to this feat with ten matches and one goal.

After falling down the pecking order at Benfica, Argel had a six-month stay at Racing de Santander, going on to retire in 2007 after representing Cruzeiro, Canoas and Chinese club Zhejiang Lucheng.

== International career ==
Argel represented Brazil at under-20 level, winning both the South American Youth Football Championship and the FIFA U-20 World Cup. On 29 March 1995 he earned his only cap for the full side, appearing in a friendly against Honduras.

== Coaching career ==
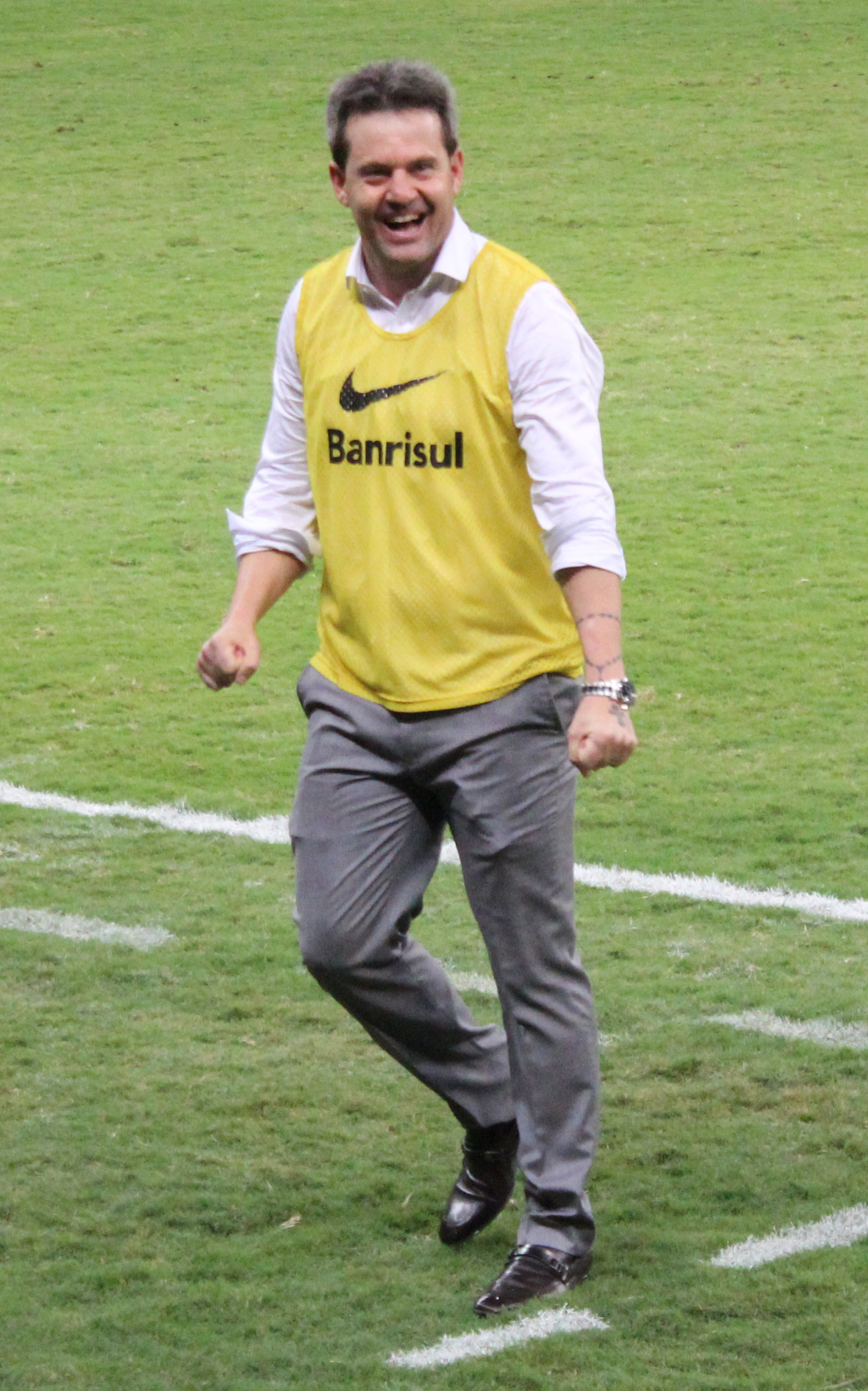
Argel as head coach of Internacional in 2016

Argel's coaching career began when he was hired as Guaratinguetá's head coach on 8 February 2008, being sacked exactly one year later. Three days later, he was hired by Caxias.

On 2 June 2009, Argel was hired by Campinense in the same capacity, replacing Fernando Teixeira. On 9 April of the following year, he signed for Criciúma.

Argel was announced as coach of former club Internacional on 13 August 2015, after leaving Figueirense which he had already managed in two separate spells. He was fired on 11 July after six games without a win, but hours later he returned to Figueirense.

On 13 September 2016, Argel was named head coach of Vitória. The following 1 May, after elimination from the Copa do Nordeste against Bahia and the massive brawl that ensued, he was sacked. This was his tenth dismissal in the decade – three alone in 2011 – while he had also resigned from seven jobs; only at Figueirense did he complete a full year in charge of a team.

After rejoining Criciúma, Argel was dismissed in May 2018. In September, he was announced as the new head coach of fellow Série B team Coritiba, being relieved of his duties on 16 February 2019 after being knocked out of the Copa do Brasil.

On 2 July 2019, Argel replaced Marcelo Cabo at the helm of first division newcomers CSA. On 28 November, he took over fellow top-tier side Ceará in the place of fired Adílson Batista, but was dismissed the following 9 February.

Argel returned to CSA on 31 August 2020, but was fired after only 18 days in charge. In October 2021, following a second spell at Botafogo de Ribeirão Preto, he returned to Portugal 17 years after leaving to take charge of third-division club Alverca.

On 19 March 2023, Argel went back to Brazil after being named at Chapecoense in the second tier. He was dismissed on 29 May, and took over ABC in the same league on 3 September; he left the latter on 22 November before the last match of the season, with his team already relegated.

On 16 February 2024, Argel returned to Caxias for a third stint. On 27 June, he was fired.

== Surname ==
Some of Argel's fame stemmed from his prior surname, which coincided with a form of the English word "fuck". This led to some double entendre headlines, including one from Eurosport.com titled "Fucks off to Benfica"; this headline received press coverage itself with The Register calling it "snappy and eye-catching", and football humour site Laugh FC deeming it "one of the all time greats".

Argel corrected his surname to "Fuchs" in 2020, explaining that the previous one resulted from a registry error and it was always supposed to have been Fuchs.

== Career statistics ==
=== Club ===
Appearances and goals by club, season and competition
Club	Season	League		
Club	Season	Division	Apps	Goals
Internacional	1993	Série A	4	0
Internacional	1994	Série A	22	2
Internacional	1995	Série A	16	1
Internacional	Total		42	3
Verdy Kawasaki	1996	J1 League	14	0
Verdy Kawasaki	1997	J1 League	18	0
Verdy Kawasaki	Total		32	0
Santos	1998	Série A	21	2
Santos	1999	Série A	0	0
Santos	Total		21	2
Porto	1999–2000	Primeira Liga	5	1
Palmeiras	2000	Série A	0	0
Palmeiras	2001	Série A	0	0
Palmeiras	Total		0	0
Benfica	2001–02	Primeira Liga	22	2
Benfica	2002–03	Primeira Liga	28	2
Benfica	2003–04	Primeira Liga	19	1
Benfica	2004–05	Primeira Liga	10	1
Benfica	Total		57	4
Racing Santander	2004–05	La Liga	2	0
Cruzeiro	2005	Série A	10	0
Canoas	2006	Série C	0	0
Hangzhou Greentown	2007	Super League	22	1
Career total			213	13

=== International ===
Appearances and goals by national team and year
National team	Year	Apps	Goals
Brazil	1995	1	0
Total		1	0

== Managerial statistics ==
As of match played 12 July 2025

Managerial record by team and tenure
Team	Nat	From	To	Record							
Team	Nat	From	To	G	W	D	L	GF	GA	GD	Win %
Portuguesa	(Brazil)	2 February 2014	17 May 2014	18	7	3	8	28	26	+2	38.89
Figueirense	(Brazil)	24 July 2014	13 August 2015	68	30	19	19	82	72	+10	44.12
Internacional	(Brazil)	14 August 2015	10 July 2016	60	31	15	14	84	46	+38	51.67
Figueirense	(Brazil)	11 July 2016	21 August 2016	8	1	4	3	5	12	−7	12.50
Vitória	(Brazil)	12 September 2016	1 May 2017	42	27	5	10	76	38	+38	64.29
Goiás	(Brazil)	19 July 2017	25 August 2017	8	2	2	4	7	10	−3	25.00
Criciúma	(Brazil)	22 February 2018	9 May 2018	14	5	2	7	17	18	−1	35.71
Coritiba	(Brazil)	17 September 2018	15 February 2019	18	6	8	4	23	22	+1	33.33
CSA	(Brazil)	2 July 2019	29 November 2019	26	7	5	14	19	36	−17	26.92
Ceará	(Brazil)	29 November 2019	9 February 2020	8	1	6	1	7	7	+0	12.50
CSA	(Brazil)	31 August 2020	16 September 2020	4	0	1	3	4	7	−3	0.00
Botafogo-SP	(Brazil)	9 April 2021	19 September 2021	26	8	9	9	27	29	−2	30.77
Alverca	(Portugal)	4 October 2021	3 October 2022	35	19	6	10	50	36	+14	54.29
Chapecoense	(Brazil)	21 March 2023	29 May 2023	9	2	3	4	14	13	+1	22.22
ABC	(Brazil)	4 September 2023	22 November 2023	12	3	3	6	12	17	−5	25.00
Caxias-RS	(Brazil)	19 February 2024	27 June 2024	20	6	5	9	24	29	−5	30.00
Paraná	(Brazil)	11 November 2024	27 January 2025	5	0	2	3	2	7	−5	0.00
Total				381	155	98	128	481	425	+56	40.68

== Honours ==
Internacional

- Campeonato Gaúcho: 1992, 1994
- Copa do Brasil: 1992

Santos

- Copa CONMEBOL: 1998

Porto

- Taça de Portugal: 1999–2000
- Supertaça Cândido de Oliveira: 2000

Palmeiras

- Torneio Rio-São Paulo: 2000
- Copa dos Campeões: 2000

Benfica

- Primeira Liga: 2004–05
- Taça de Portugal: 2003–04
- Supertaça Cândido de Oliveira runner-up: 2004

Brazil U17

- South American Under-17 Football Championship: 1991

Brazil U20

- FIFA World Youth Championship: 1993
- South American Youth Football Championship: 1992
