= 2000 in Brazilian football =

Football in Brazil
- Season: 2000

The following article presents a summary of the 2000 football (soccer) season in Brazil, which was the 99th season of competitive football in the country.

== Copa João Havelange ==
The Copa João Havelange was a competition organized by the Clube dos 13, but later recognized by the Brazilian Football Confederation, that replaced the Campeonato Brasileiro Série A, the Campeonato Brasileiro Série B and the Campeonato Brasileiro Série C.

Quarterfinals

Team 1	Agg.	Team 2	1st leg	2nd leg
Internacional	3-4	Cruzeiro	1-1	2-3
Grêmio	3-2	Sport	2-1	1-1
Vasco	3-2	Paraná	3-1	0-1
Palmeiras	5-6	São Caetano	3-4	2-2

Semifinals

Team 1	Agg.	Team 2	1st leg	2nd leg
São Caetano	6-3	Grêmio	3-2	3-1
Vasco	5-3	Cruzeiro	2-2	3-1

Final

December 27, 2000

São Caetano	1–1	Vasco

Parque Antártica

January 18, 2001

Vasco	3–1	São Caetano

Maracanã

Vasco declared as the Copa João Havelange champions by aggregate score of 4–2.

== Copa do Brasil ==
The Copa do Brasil final was played between Cruzeiro and São Paulo.

July 5, 2000

São Paulo	0–0	Cruzeiro

Morumbi

July 7, 2000

Cruzeiro	2–1	São Paulo

Mineirão

Cruzeiro declared as the cup champions by aggregate score of 2–1.

== Copa dos Campeões ==
The Copa dos Campeões final was played in a single match between Sport and Palmeiras.

July 25, 2000

Sport	1–2	Palmeiras

Rei Pelé

Palmeiras declared as the cup champions after beating Sport 2–1.

== Regional and state championship champions ==
Regional championship champions

Competition	Champion
Campeonato do Nordeste	Sport Recife
Copa Centro-Oeste	Goiás
Copa Norte	São Raimundo
Copa Sul-Minas	América-MG
Torneio Rio-São Paulo	Palmeiras

State championship champions

State	Champion	State	Champion
Acre	Rio Branco	Paraíba	Treze
Alagoas	ASA	Paraná	Atlético Paranaense
Amapá	Santos-AP	Pernambuco	Sport Recife
Amazonas	Nacional	Piauí	River
Bahia	Vitória	Rio de Janeiro	Flamengo
Ceará	Fortaleza	Rio Grande do Norte	ABC
Distrito Federal	Gama	Rio Grande do Sul	Caxias
Espírito Santo	Desportiva	Rondônia	Guajará
Goiás	Goiás	Roraima	Rio Negro-RR
Maranhão	Moto Club	Santa Catarina	Joinville
Mato Grosso	Juventude-MT	São Paulo	São Paulo
Mato Grosso do Sul	Comercial	Sergipe	Sergipe
Minas Gerais	Atlético Mineiro	Tocantins	Palmas
Pará	Paysandu		

== Youth competition champions ==
Competition	Champion
Copa Macaé de Juvenis	Internacional
Copa Santiago de Futebol Juvenil	Grêmio
Copa São Paulo de Juniores	São Paulo
Taça Belo Horizonte de Juniores	América-MG

== Other competition champions ==
Competition	Champion
Copa Pernambuco	Recife
Copa Rio	Portuguesa-RJ
Taça Minas Gerais	URT

== Brazilian clubs in international competitions ==
Team	Copa Libertadores 2000	Copa Mercosur 2000	FIFA Club World Championship 2000
Atlético Mineiro	Quarterfinals	Semifinals	N/A
Atlético Paranaense	Round of 16	Did not qualify	N/A
Corinthians	Semifinals	Group stage	Champions
Cruzeiro	Did not qualify	Quarterfinals	N/A
Flamengo	Did not qualify	Quarterfinals	N/A
Juventude	Group stage	Did not qualify	N/A
Palmeiras	Runner-up	Runner-up	N/A
São Paulo	Did not qualify	Group stage	N/A
Vasco	Did not qualify	Champions	Runner-up

== Brazil national team ==
The following table lists all the games played by the Brazil national football team in official competitions and friendly matches during 2000.

Date	Opposition	Result	Score	Brazil scorers	Competition
February 23, 2000	Thailand	W	7–0	Rivaldo (2), Ronaldinho, Emerson (2), Roque Júnior, Jardel	International Friendly
February 28, 2000	Colombia	D	0–0	-	World Cup Qualifying
April 26, 2000	Ecuador	W	3–2	Rivaldo (2), Antônio Carlos	World Cup Qualifying
May 23, 2000	Wales	W	3–0	Élber, Cafu, Rivaldo	International Friendly
May 27, 2000	England	D	1–1	França	International Friendly
June 4, 2000	Peru	W	1–0	Antônio Carlos	World Cup Qualifying
June 28, 2000	Uruguay	D	1–1	Rivaldo	World Cup Qualifying
July 18, 2000	Paraguay	L	1–2	Rivaldo	World Cup Qualifying
July 26, 2000	Argentina	W	3–1	Alex, Vampeta (2)	World Cup Qualifying
August 15, 2000	Chile	L	0–3	-	World Cup Qualifying
September 3, 2000	Bolivia	W	5–0	Romário (3), Rivaldo, Sandy (own goal)	World Cup Qualifying
October 8, 2000	Venezuela	W	6–0	Euller, Juninho, Romário (4)	World Cup Qualifying
November 15, 2000	Colombia	W	1–0	Roque Júnior	World Cup Qualifying

== Women's football ==
=== Brazil women's national football team ===
The following table lists all the games played by the Brazil women's national football team in official competitions and friendly matches during 2000.

Date	Opposition	Result	Score	Brazil scorers	Competition
June 23, 2000	Costa Rica	W	8–0	Roseli (2), Formiga (2), Kátia Cilene, Mônica de Paula, Sissi, Maycon	CONCACAF Women's Gold Cup
June 25, 2000	Trinidad and Tobago	W	11–0	Kátia Cilene (6), Roseli (2), Daniela Alves, Cidinha, Mônica de Paula	CONCACAF Women's Gold Cup
June 27, 2000	United States	D	0–0	-	CONCACAF Women's Gold Cup
July 1, 2000	China	W	2–2 (aet: 1–0)	Kátia Cilene, Roseli	CONCACAF Women's Gold Cup
July 3, 2000	United States	L	0–1	-	CONCACAF Women's Gold Cup
September 1, 2000	United States	L	0–4	-	International Friendly
September 13, 2000	Sweden	W	2–0	Pretinha, Kátia Cilene	Summer Olympics
September 16, 2000	Germany	L	1–2	Raquel	Summer Olympics
September 19, 2000	Australia	W	2–1	Raquel, Kátia Cilene	Summer Olympics
September 24, 2000	United States	L	0–1	-	Summer Olympics
September 28, 2000	Germany	L	0–2	-	Summer Olympics

The Brazil women's national football team competed in the following competitions in 2000:

Competition	Performance
CONCACAF Women's Gold Cup	Runner-up
Summer Olympics	Semifinals

=== Domestic competition champions ===
Competition	Champion
Campeonato Brasileiro	Portuguesa
Campeonato Carioca	Vasco
Campeonato Paulista	Portuguesa
