= Alessandro Cambalhota =

Brazilian footballer (born 1973)

Personal information
- Full name: Alessandro Andrade de Oliveira
- Date of birth: 27 May 1973 (age 53)
- Place of birth: Teixeira de Freitas, Brazil
- Height: 1.70 m (5 ft 7 in)
- Position: Striker

Senior career*
Years	Team	Apps	(Gls)
1993–1995	Novorizontino		
1995	Vasco da Gama		
1996–1997	Santos		
1997–1998	Júbilo Iwata		
1998–1999	Santos		
1999–2000	Porto		
2000	Fluminense		
2001–2002	Cruzeiro		
2003	Atlético Mineiro		
2003–2004	Kuwait SC		
2004	Corinthians Paulista		
2005	Al-Ahli Jeddah		
2005	Figueirense		
2006	Denizlispor		
2006–2007	Kayseri Erciyesspor		
2007–2008	Guaratinguetá		
2008–2009	Noroeste		
2010–2011	Linense		
2012	Novorizontino		

International career
1999	Brazil	1	(0)
- * Club domestic league appearances and goals

Alessandro Andrade de Oliveira (born 27 May 1973), known as Alessandro Cambalhota, is a Brazilian former professional footballer who played as a striker. He made one appearance for the Brazil national team.

== Career statistics ==
=== Club ===
Appearances and goals by club, season and competition
Club	Season	League			National cup (Note: Includes Copa do Brasil, Emperor's Cup, Taça de Portugal, Crown Prince Cup, Turkish Cup.)		League cup (Note: Includes J.League Cup, Taça da Liga.)		Total	
Club	Season	Division	Apps	Goals	Apps	Goals	Apps	Goals	Apps	Goals
Vasco da Gama	1995	Série A	2	0					2	0
Santos	1996	Série A	19	6					19	6
Santos	1997	Série A	1	1					1	1
Santos	Total		20	7					20	7
Júbilo Iwata	1997	J1 League	13	5	3	1	2	0	18	6
Júbilo Iwata	1998	J1 League	9	3	0	0	4	1	13	4
Júbilo Iwata	Total		22	8	3	1	6	1	31	10
Santos	1998	Série A	24	4					24	4
Santos	1999	Série A	0	0					0	0
Santos	Total		24	4					24	4
Porto	1999–2000	Primeira Liga	21	1					21	1
Fluminense	2000	Série A	18	1					18	1
Cruzeiro	2001	Série A	0	0					0	0
Cruzeiro	2002	Série A	18	4					18	4
Cruzeiro	Total		18	4					18	4
Atlético Mineiro	2003	Série A	6	2					6	2
Corinthians Paulista	2004	Série A	13	1					13	1
Al-Ahli Jeddah	2004–05	Professional League	0	0					0	0
Figueirense	2005	Série A	13	4					13	4
Denizlispor	2005–06	Süper Lig	12	3					12	3
Denizlispor	2006–07	Süper Lig	9	0					9	0
Denizlispor	Total		21	3					21	3
Career total			178	35	3	1	6	1	187	37

=== International ===
Appearances and goals by national team and year
National team	Year	Apps	Goals
Brazil
1999	1	0	
Total		1	0

== Honours ==
Santos

- Copa CONMEBOL: 1998

Porto

- Taça de Portugal: 1999–2000
- Supertaça Cândido de Oliveira: 1999
