= Athirson =

Brazilian footballer (born 1977)

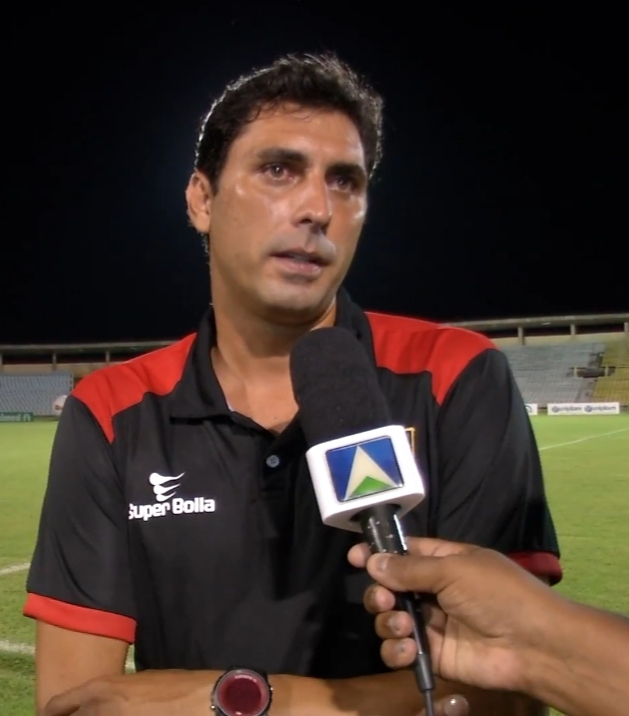

Personal information
- Full name: Athirson Mazzoli e Oliveira
- Date of birth: 16 January 1977 (age 49)
- Place of birth: Rio de Janeiro, Brazil
- Height: 1.83 m (6 ft 0 in)
- Positions: Left winger; left-back

Youth career
- Flamengo

Senior career*
Years	Team	Apps	(Gls)
1996–2000	Flamengo	56	(3)
1998	→ Santos (loan)	25	(1)
2001–2003	Juventus	5	(0)
2002–2003	→ Flamengo (loan)	23	(4)
2004	Flamengo	20	(2)
2005	Cruzeiro	6	(1)
2005–2007	Bayer Leverkusen	30	(2)
2007	Botafogo	3	(0)
2008	Brasiliense	6	(0)
2008–2009	Portuguesa	13	(3)
2009	Cruzeiro	11	(0)
2010	Portuguesa	24	(3)
2011	America-RJ	0	(0)
2012	Duque de Caxias	0	(0)

International career
1999–2000	Brazil – (U-23)	14	(2)
1999–2003	Brazil	5	(0)

Managerial career
- 2015: São Cristóvão
- 2016: Flamengo do Piauí
- 2017: Alecrim
- 2017: Boca Raton
- 2018–2019: Goytacaz
- * Club domestic league appearances and goals

Athirson Mazzoli e Oliveira, (born 16 January 1977), better known as Athirson, is a Brazilian football coach and former player who played as a left-back.

== Club career ==
Athirson was born in Rio de Janeiro and played much of his early career at Flamengo. He was signed by Italian club Juventus in 2001, but was loaned to Flamengo in February 2002. His contract was terminated in October 2003.

=== Late career ===
In 2005 Athirson was signed by Bayer Leverkusen, but was released after two years, along with fellow Brazilian defender Roque Junior. He then signed a six months contract with Botafogo. but his contract was terminated on 4 October 2007, after just playing only seven times for the club.

He signed a one-year contract with Brasiliense on 22 February 2008, then signed for Portuguesa in September 2008. On 26 April 2009 the left-back signed for Cruzeiro on a free transfer until December.

He had received an offer from America-RJ after his contract with Portuguesa expired on 31 December 2010. In 2011, he signed for Duque de Caxias to play at Campeonato Brasileiro Série B but was released during the competition. On 6 October 2011, he signed for Projecta, a Brazilian indoor soccer club based at Espírito Santo.

== International career ==
Athirson played five times for the Brazil national team, and was a member of the Brazil squad which finished in second place at the 1999 FIFA Confederations Cup. He also made 14 appearances and scored two goals for the Brazilian U-23 side, which competed at the 2000 Summer Olympics. He was a member of the Brazil under-20 squad which won the 1997 FIFA World Youth Championship.

== Style of play ==
Usually an attacking left back or wing-back, Athirson could also play on the left wing, and as an attacking midfielder. He was useful there because of his accurate passing, long-range striking ability, attacking drive, and articulate dribbling skills. His talent, playing style, nationality, and position led him to be compared to compatriot Roberto Carlos in his youth.

== Managerial career ==
Athirson was appointed coach of Goytacaz in October 2018.

== Honours ==
=== Club ===
Flamengo

- Copa de Oro: 1996
- Copa Mercosur: 1999
- Taça Rio: 2000
- Taça Guanabara: 1999, 2004
- Rio de Janeiro State League: 1999, 2000

Santos

- Copa CONMEBOL: 1998

Juventus

- Serie A: 2001–02

=== International ===
Brazil

- Toulon Tournament: 1996
- Gold Cup: 1996
- Copa América: 1999
- Pre-Olympic Tournament: 2000

=== Individual ===
- Brazilian Bola de Prata (Placar): 2002
