= Eduardo Marques =

Brazilian footballer (born 1976)

Personal information
- Full name: Eduardo Marques de Jesus Passos
- Date of birth: June 26, 1976 (age 50)
- Place of birth: Santos, Brazil
- Height: 1.81 m (5 ft 11 in)
- Position: Striker

Youth career
- Santos

Senior career*
Years	Team	Apps	(Gls)
1997–2000	Santos	39	(4)
2001	Sport Recife	?	(?)
2001	Guarani	20	(1)
2002	Santo André	?	(?)
2002	Os Belenenses	22	(2)
2003	Grêmio	8	(0)
2004	Hapoel Tel Aviv	15	(1)
2005	Maccabi Tel Aviv	14	(0)
2006	Daegu FC	23	(3)
2007	Zhejiang Lücheng	5	(1)
2007	Shonan Bellmare	20	(5)
2008–2009	APOP Kinyras	41	(4)
2009	Aris Limassol	18	(4)
2010–2011	AEP Paphos	36	(6)
- * Club domestic league appearances and goals as of 1 May 2010

Eduardo Marques de Jesus Passos, or simply Eduardo Marques (born June 26, 1976), is a Brazilian striker, currently played for AEP Paphos in the Cypriot First Division.

== Honours ==
Maccabi Tel Aviv

- Israel State Cup: 2004–05

APOP Kinyras

- Cypriot Cup: 2008–09
