= 2002 in Brazilian football =

Football in Brazil
- Season: 2002

The following article presents a summary of the 2002 football (soccer) season in Brazil, which was the 101st season of competitive football in the country.

== Campeonato Brasileiro Série A ==
Quarterfinals

Team 1	Agg.	Team 2	1st leg	2nd leg
Fluminense	3-2	São Caetano	3-0	0-2
Atlético Mineiro	3-8	Corinthians	2-6	1-2
Grêmio	1-0	Juventude	0-0	1-0
Santos	5-2	São Paulo	3-1	2-1

Semifinals

Team 1	Agg.	Team 2	1st leg	2nd leg
Fluminense	3-3	Corinthians	1-0	2-3
Santos	3-1	Grêmio	3-0	0-1

Final

December 8, 2002

Santos	2–0	Corinthians

Morumbi

December 15, 2002

Corinthians	2–3	Santos

Morumbi

Santos declared as the Campeonato Brasileiro champions by aggregate score of 5-2.

=== Relegation ===
The four worst placed teams, which are Portuguesa, Palmeiras, Gama and Botafogo, were relegated to the following year's second level.

== Campeonato Brasileiro Série B ==
The Campeonato Brasileiro Série B final was played between Fortaleza and Criciúma.

June 8, 2002

Fortaleza	2–0	Criciúma

Castelão

June 11, 2002

Criciúma	4–1	Fortaleza

Heriberto Hülse

Criciúma declared as the Campeonato Brasileiro Série B champions by aggregate score of 4-3.

=== Promotion ===
The champion and the runner-up, which are Criciúma and Fortaleza, were promoted to the following year's first level.

=== Relegation ===
The six worst placed teams, which are Americano, Botafogo-SP, Sampaio Corrêa, Guarany-CE, XV de Piracicaba and Bragantino, were relegated to the following year's third level.

== Campeonato Brasileiro Série C ==
Final stage
Pos	Team	Pld	W	D	L	GF	GA	GD	Pts
1	Brasiliense (P)	6	3	3	0	9	5	+4	12
2	Marília (P)	6	3	2	1	11	7	+4	11
3	Ipatinga	6	1	2	3	8	10	−2	5
4	Nacional-AM	6	1	1	4	3	9	−6	4

Source: rsssf.com
(P) Promoted to Série B 2003

Brasiliense declared as the Campeonato Brasileiro Série C champions.

=== Promotion ===
The two best placed teams in the final stage of the competition, which are Brasiliense and Marília, were promoted to the following year's second level.

== Copa do Brasil ==
The Copa do Brasil final was played between Corinthians and Brasiliense.

May 8, 2002

Corinthians	2–1	Brasiliense

Morumbi

May 15, 2002

Brasiliense	1–1	Corinthians

Serejão

Corinthians declared as the cup champions by aggregate score of 3-2.

== Copa dos Campeões ==
The Copa dos Campeões final was played between Paysandu and Cruzeiro.

July 31, 2002

Paysandu	1–2	Cruzeiro

Mangueirão

August 4, 2002

Cruzeiro	3–4	Paysandu

Castelão

Paysandu declared as the cup champions by aggregate score of 5-5.

== Regional and state championship champions ==
Regional championship champions

Competition	Champion
Campeonato do Nordeste	Bahia
Copa Centro-Oeste	Goiás
Copa Norte	Paysandu
Copa Sul-Minas	Cruzeiro
Torneio Rio-São Paulo	Corinthians

State championship champions

State	Champion	State	Champion
Acre	Rio Branco	Paraíba	Atlético Cajazeirense
Alagoas	CRB	Paraná	Iraty; Atlético Paranaense^{(1)}
Amapá	Ypiranga	Pernambuco	Náutico
Amazonas	Nacional	Piauí	River
Bahia	Palmeiras do Nordeste; Vitória^{(1)}	Rio de Janeiro	Fluminense^{(2)}
Ceará	Ceará	Rio Grande do Norte	América-RN
Distrito Federal	CFZ de Brasília	Rio Grande do Sul	Internacional
Espírito Santo	Alegrense	Rondônia	CFA
Goiás	Goiás	Roraima	Atlético Roraima
Maranhão	Sampaio Corrêa	Santa Catarina	Figueirense
Mato Grosso	Operário (VG)	São Paulo	Ituano; São Paulo^{(1)}
Mato Grosso do Sul	CENE	Sergipe	Confiança
Minas Gerais	Caldense; Cruzeiro^{(1)}	Tocantins	Tocantinópolis
Pará	Paysandu		

^{(1)}The club won a competition named Supercampeonato (Superchampionship), which was an extra tournament that included regional championship teams.

^{(2)}According to the Rio de Janeiro State Football Federation, the 2002 Rio de Janeiro State Championship is sub judice.

== Youth competition champions ==
Competition	Champion
Copa Macaé de Juvenis	Fluminense
Copa Santiago de Futebol Juvenil	Cruzeiro
Copa São Paulo de Juniores	Portuguesa
Copa Sub-17 de Promissão	Corinthians
Taça Belo Horizonte de Juniores	Palmeiras

== Other competition champions ==
Competition	Champion
Copa FPF	São Bento
Copa Pernambuco	Recife

== Brazilian clubs in international competitions ==
Team	Copa Libertadores 2002	Copa Sudamericana 2002
Atlético Paranaense	Group stage	N/A
Flamengo	Group stage	N/A
Grêmio	Semifinals	N/A
São Caetano	Runner-up	N/A

== Brazil national team ==
The following table lists all the games played by the Brazil national football team in official competitions and friendly matches during 2002.

Date	Opposition	Result	Score	Brazil scorers	Competition
January 31, 2002	Bolivia	W	6–0	Cris, Gilberto Silva (2), Kléberson, Washington, Ânderson Polga	International Friendly
February 6, 2002	Saudi Arabia	W	1–0	Djalminha	International Friendly
March 7, 2002	Iceland	W	6–1	Ânderson Polga (2), Kléberson, Kaká, Gilberto Silva, Edílson	International Friendly
March 27, 2002	Yugoslavia	W	1–0	Luizão	International Friendly
April 17, 2002	Portugal	D	1–1	Ronaldinho	International Friendly
May 18, 2002	Catalonia	W	3–1	Ronaldinho (2), Edmílson	International Friendly (unofficial match)
May 25, 2002	Malaysia	W	4–0	Ronaldo, Juninho, Denílson, Edílson	International Friendly
June 3, 2002	Turkey	W	2–1	Ronaldo, Rivaldo	World Cup
June 8, 2002	China	W	4–0	Roberto Carlos, Rivaldo, Ronaldinho, Ronaldo	World Cup
June 13, 2002	Costa Rica	W	5–2	Ronaldo (2), Edmílson, Rivaldo, Júnior	World Cup
June 17, 2002	Belgium	W	2–0	Rivaldo, Ronaldo	World Cup
June 21, 2002	England	W	2–1	Rivaldo, Ronaldinho	World Cup
June 26, 2002	Turkey	W	1–0	Ronaldo	World Cup
June 30, 2002	Germany	W	2–0	Ronaldo (2)	World Cup
August 21, 2002	Paraguay	L	0–1	-	International Friendly
November 20, 2002	South Korea	W	3–2	Ronaldo (2), Ronaldinho	International Friendly

== Women's football ==
=== Brazil women's national football team ===
The Brazil women's national football team did not play any matches in 2002.
