= Ânderson Lima (footballer, born 1973) =

Brazilian footballer

Personal information
- Full name: Ânderson Lima Veiga
- Date of birth: March 18, 1973 (age 53)
- Place of birth: São Paulo, Brazil
- Height: 1.76 m (5 ft 9 in)
- Positions: Right wing back; right back

Senior career*
| Years | Team | Apps | (Gls) |
| 1992–1995 | Juventus | | |
| 1995 | Guarani | 19 | (1) |
| 1996–1999 | Santos | | |
| 1999 | São Paulo | 15 | (1) |
| 2000–2003 | Grêmio | 82 | (18) |
| 2004 | São Caetano | 33 | (9) |
| 2005 | Albirex Niigata | 30 | (8) |
| 2006 | São Caetano | | |
| 2007 | Coritiba | | |
| 2008 | Operário-MS | | |
| 2008 | Bragantino | | |
| 2009– | Chapecoense | | |

International career
| 1989 | Brazil U-17 | | |
| 1991 | Brazil U-20 | | |

Managerial career
- 2011: Cruzeiro (assistant)
- 2011–2012: Bahia (assistant)
- 2012: Portuguesa (assistant)
- 2013: Bahia (assistant)
- * Club domestic league appearances and goals as of January 6, 2008

Ânderson Lima Veiga (born March 18, 1973), or simply Ânderson Lima, is a Brazilian football midfielder. He is well known as being a free-kick specialist in Brazil.

== Club statistics ==
| Club performance | | | League | | Cup | | League Cup | | Total | |
| Season | Club | League | Apps | Goals | Apps | Goals | Apps | Goals | Apps | Goals |
| Brazil | | | League | | Copa do Brasil | | League Cup | | Total | |
|---|---|---|---|---|---|---|---|---|---|---|
| 1995 | Guarani | Série A | 19 | 1 | | | | | 19 | 1 |
| 1996 | Santos | Série A | 16 | 2 | | | | | 16 | 2 |
| 1997 | Santos | Série A | 18 | 0 | | | | | 18 | 0 |
| 1998 | Santos | Série A | 17 | 3 | | | | | 17 | 3 |
| 1999 | Santos | Série A | 0 | 0 | | | | | 0 | 0 |
| 1999 | São Paulo | Série A | 15 | 1 | | | | | 15 | 1 |
| 2000 | Grêmio | Série A | 18 | 1 | | | | | 18 | 1 |
| 2001 | Grêmio | Série A | 14 | 1 | | | | | 14 | 1 |
| 2002 | Grêmio | Série A | 18 | 7 | | | | | 18 | 7 |
| 2003 | Grêmio | Série A | 32 | 8 | | | | | 32 | 8 |
| 2004 | São Caetano | Série A | 33 | 9 | | | | | 33 | 9 |
| Japan | | | League | | Emperor's Cup | | J.League Cup | | Total | |
| 2005 | Albirex Niigata | J1 League | 30 | 8 | 1 | 0 | 5 | 0 | 36 | 8 |
| Brazil | | | League | | Copa do Brasil | | League Cup | | Total | |
| 2006 | São Caetano | Série A | 25 | 7 | | | | | 25 | 7 |
| 2007 | Coritiba | Série B | 25 | 3 | | | | | 25 | 3 |
| Country | Brazil | | 250 | 43 | | | | | 250 | 43 |
| Country | Japan | | 30 | 8 | 1 | 0 | 5 | 0 | 36 | 8 |
| Total | | | 280 | 51 | 1 | 0 | 5 | 0 | 286 | 51 |

== Honours ==
Brazil

- South American Under-17 Championship: 1988
- South American Under-20 Championship: 1991

Santos

- Torneio Rio-São Paulo: 1997
- Copa Conmebol: 1998

Grêmio

- Copa do Brasil: 2001
- Campeonato Gaúcho: 2001

São Caetano

- Campeonato Paulista: 2004

Coritiba

- Campeonato Brasileiro Série B: 2007
