= 2001 in Brazilian football =

Football in Brazil
- Season: 2001

The following article presents a summary of the 2001 football (soccer) season in Brazil, which was the 100th season of competitive football in the country.

== Campeonato Brasileiro Série A ==
Quarterfinals

Home team	Score	Away team
São Caetano	0-0 (aet 0-0)	Bahia
Atlético-PR	2-1	São Paulo
Fluminense	1-1 (aet 2-1)	Ponte Preta
Atlético Mineiro	3-0	Grêmio

Semifinals

Home team	Score	Away team
São Caetano	2-1	Atlético Mineiro
Atlético-PR	3-2	Fluminense

Final

December 16, 2001

Atlético-PR	4–2	São Caetano

Arena da Baixada

December 23, 2001

São Caetano	0–1	Atlético-PR

Anacleto Campanella

Atlético-PR declared as the Campeonato Brasileiro champions by aggregate score of 5-2.

=== Relegation ===
The four worst placed teams, which are Santa Cruz, América-MG Botafogo-SP and Sport, were relegated to the following year's second level.

== Campeonato Brasileiro Série B ==
Pos	Team	Pld	W	D	L	GF	GA	GD	Pts	Promotion	PAY	FIG	CAX	AVA
1	Paysandu	6	2	3	1	16	10	+6	9	Promoted to Série A 2002		3–0	0–0	4–0
2	Figueirense	6	2	3	1	7	7	0	6	Promoted to Série A 2002	3–3		1–0 (Note: The match was annulled at 90 minutes due to pitch invasion. While the result stood, Figueirense did not earn the points.)	2–0
3	Caxias	6	1	3	2	6	7	−1	6		4–3	0–0		2–2
4	Avaí	6	1	3	2	8	13	−5	6		3–3	2–2	1–0	

Notes:

Paysandu declared as the Campeonato Brasileiro Série B champions.

=== Promotion ===
The two best placed teams in the final stage of the competition, which are Paysandu and Figueirense, were promoted to the following year's first level.

=== Relegation ===
The four clubs defeated in the relegation playoffs, which are ABC, Nacional-AM, Desportiva-ES and Serra, were relegated to the following year's third level.

== Campeonato Brasileiro Série C ==
Pos	Team	Pld	W	D	L	GF	GA	GD	Pts	ETJ	MGM	GSB	ACG
1	Etti Jundiaí (P)	6	4	2	0	13	7	+6	14		2–1	2–2	2–0
2	Mogi Mirim (P)	6	3	0	3	13	12	+1	9	1–3		3–0	1–0
3	Guarany de Sobral (P)	6	2	2	2	11	13	−2	8	1–1	5–3		2–1
4	Atlético Goianiense	6	1	0	5	8	13	−5	3	2–3	2–4	3–1	

Source: rsssf.com
(P) Promoted to Série B 2002

Etti Jundiaí declared as the Campeonato Brasileiro Série C champions.

=== Promotion ===
The two best placed teams in the final stage of the competition, which are Etti Jundiaí and Mogi Mirim, were promoted to the following year's second level.

== Copa do Brasil ==
The Copa do Brasil final was played between Grêmio and Corinthians.

June 10, 2001

Grêmio	2–2	Corinthians

Olímpico

June 17, 2001

Corinthians	1–3	Grêmio

Morumbi

Grêmio declared as the cup champions by aggregate score of 5-3.

== Copa dos Campeões ==
The Copa dos Campeões final was played between Flamengo and São Paulo.

July 7, 2001

São Paulo	3–5	Flamengo

Almeidão

July 11, 2001

Flamengo	2–3	São Paulo

Rei Pelé

Flamengo declared as the cup champions by aggregate score of 7-6.

== Regional and state championship champions ==
Regional championship champions

Competition	Champion
Campeonato do Nordeste	Bahia
Copa Centro-Oeste	Goiás
Copa Norte	São Raimundo
Copa Sul-Minas	Cruzeiro
Torneio Rio-São Paulo	São Paulo

State championship champions

State	Champion	State	Champion
Acre	Vasco-AC	Paraíba	Treze
Alagoas	ASA	Paraná	Atlético Paranaense
Amapá	Independente	Pernambuco	Náutico
Amazonas	Rio Negro	Piauí	River
Bahia	Bahia	Rio de Janeiro	Flamengo
Ceará	Fortaleza	Rio Grande do Norte	Coríntians
Distrito Federal	Gama	Rio Grande do Sul	Grêmio
Espírito Santo	Alegrense	Rondônia	Ji-Paraná
Goiás	Vila Nova	Roraima	Atlético Roraima
Maranhão	Moto Club	Santa Catarina	Joinville
Mato Grosso	Juventude-MT	São Paulo	Corinthians
Mato Grosso do Sul	Comercial	Sergipe	Confiança
Minas Gerais	América-MG	Tocantins	Palmas
Pará	Paysandu		

== Youth competition champions ==
Competition	Champion
Copa Macaé de Juvenis	Internacional
Copa Santiago de Futebol Juvenil	Internacional
Copa São Paulo de Juniores	Roma Barueri
Copa Sub-17 de Promissão	União São João
Taça Belo Horizonte de Juniores	Cruzeiro

== Other competition champions ==
Competition	Champion
Copa FPF	Bandeirante
Copa Pernambuco	Central

== Brazilian clubs in international competitions ==
Team	Copa Libertadores 2001	Copa Mercosur 2001
Corinthians	Did not qualify	Semifinals
Cruzeiro	Quarterfinals	Group stage
Flamengo	Did not qualify	Runner-up
Grêmio	Did not qualify	Semifinals
Palmeiras	Semifinals	Group stage
São Caetano	Round of 16	Did not qualify
São Paulo	Did not qualify	Group stage
Vasco	Quarterfinals	Group stage

== Brazil national team ==
The following table lists all the games played by the Brazil national football team in official competitions and friendly matches during 2001.

Date	Opposition	Result	Score	Brazil scorers	Competition
March 3, 2001	United States	W	2–1	Ronaldinho, Euller	International Friendly
March 6, 2001	Mexico	D	3–3	Romário (2), Edílson	International Friendly
March 28, 2001	Ecuador	L	0–1	-	World Cup Qualifying
April 25, 2001	Peru	D	1–1	Romário	World Cup Qualifying
May 26, 2001	(Japan) Tokyo Verdy	W	2–0	Washington, Baptista	International Friendly (unofficial match)
May 31, 2001	Cameroon	W	2–0	Washington, Carlos Miguel	Confederations Cup
June 2, 2001	Canada	D	0–0	-	Confederations Cup
June 4, 2001	Japan	D	0–0	-	Confederations Cup
June 7, 2001	France	L	1–2	Ramon	Confederations Cup
June 9, 2001	Australia	L	0–1	-	Confederations Cup
July 1, 2001	Uruguay	L	0–1	-	World Cup Qualifying
July 12, 2001	Mexico	L	0–1	-	Copa América
July 15, 2001	Peru	W	2–0	Guilherme, Denílson	Copa América
July 18, 2001	Paraguay	W	3–1	Alex, Belletti, Denílson	Copa América
July 23, 2001	Honduras	L	0–2	-	Copa América
August 9, 2001	Panama	W	5–0	Edílson, Alex, Euller, Juninho, Roberto Carlos	International Friendly
August 15, 2001	Paraguay	W	2–0	Marcelinho, Rivaldo	World Cup Qualifying
September 5, 2001	Argentina	L	1–2	Ayala (own goal)	World Cup Qualifying
October 7, 2001	Chile	W	2–0	Edílson, Rivaldo	World Cup Qualifying
November 7, 2001	Bolivia	L	1–3	Edílson	World Cup Qualifying
November 14, 2001	Venezuela	W	3–0	Luizão (2), Rivaldo	World Cup Qualifying

== Women's football ==
=== Brazil women's national football team ===
The following table lists all the games played by the Brazil women's national football team in official competitions and friendly matches during 2001.

Date	Opposition	Result	Score	Brazil scorers	Competition
July 18, 2001	University of New Jersey	W	16–0	Fabiana (3), Carina (3), Cristiana (3), Mildinha (2), Suzana, Daiane, Mônica de Paula, Rosana, Joana	International Friendly (unofficial match)
August 3, 2001	China	D	0–0	-	Tiger Pools Toto Cup
August 5, 2001	South Korea	L	1–3	Mildinha	Tiger Pools Toto Cup
August 7, 2001	Japan	D	1–1	Rosana	Tiger Pools Toto Cup
August 8, 2001	Japan	W	1–0	unavailable	International Friendly

=== Domestic competition champions ===
Competition	Champion
Campeonato Brasileiro	Santa Isabel
Campeonato Carioca	Barra
Campeonato Paulista	Palmeiras
