= Lúcio Bala (footballer, born 1975) =

Brazilian footballer

Personal information
- Full name: Lucenilde Pereira da Silva
- Date of birth: January 14, 1975 (age 51)
- Place of birth: Alvorada, Brazil
- Height: 1.77 m (5 ft 10 in)
- Position: Defensive midfielder

Senior career*
Years	Team	Apps	(Gls)
1995–1996	Goiás		
1997	Flamengo		
1998–1999	Santos		
2000	Portuguesa		
2001	Botafogo		
2002	Guarani		
2003–2004	Ulsan Hyundai		
2004	Fortaleza		
2004	Jaguares		
2005	Sport		
2005	Fortaleza		
2006	Al Qadisiya		
2006	Fortaleza		
2007	Atlético Mineiro		
2008	Ceará		
2009	CRB		
2009	Bragantino		
2010	Paysandu		
2011	Caldense		
2011	Gurupi		
2012	Catanduvense		
2012	Santa Helena		
2012	Gurupi		
2013	Flamengo do Piauí		
2014	Luziânia		
2014	Alvorada		
- * Club domestic league appearances and goals

Lucenilde Pereira da Silva, known as Lúcio Bala (born January 14, 1975, in Alvorada), is a Brazilian retired defensive midfielder.

== Honours ==
Goiás

- Campeonato Goiano: 1996

Flamengo

- Campeonato Carioca: 2000
- Taça Rio: 2000

Santos

- Copa Conmebol: 1998

Fortaleza

- Campeonato Cearense: 2005

Atlético Mineiro

- Campeonato Mineiro: 2007

Paysandu

- Campeonato Paraense: 2010

Gurupi

- Campeonato Tocantinense: 2011, 2012

Flamengo do Piauí

- Copa Piauí: 2013
