= Narciso (footballer) =

Brazilian footballer

Personal information
- Full name: Narciso dos Santos
- Date of birth: 23 December 1973 (age 52)
- Place of birth: Neópolis (SE) Brazil
- Height: 6 ft 4 in (1.93 m)
- Position: Midfielder

Senior career*
Years	Team	Apps	(Gls)
1994	Paraguaçuense		
1994–1998	Santos	110	(5)
1999–2000	Flamengo		
2000–2005	Santos	4	(0)

International career
1995–1998	Brazil	8	(0)

Managerial career
- 2008–2011: Santos U20
- 2011: Sergipe
- 2011–2012: Corinthians U20
- 2012–2013: Palmeiras U20
- 2013: CEOV
- 2014–2015: Penapolense
- 2015: Linense
- 2016: ABC
- 2016: XV de Piracicaba
Medal record
Representing Brazil
Men's Football
Bronze medal – third place	1996 Atlanta	Team competition
- * Club domestic league appearances and goals

Narciso dos Santos (born 23 December 1973 in Neópolis, Sergipe), simply known as Narciso, is a Brazilian football coach and former player who played as a midfielder.

He made his debut for the Brazil national team in 1995 and played his last match in 1998. He appeared in one game at the 1996 Summer Olympics; versus Portugal.

In 2000, Narciso was diagnosed with leukemia, and all evidence pointed toward his retirement from football. However, he managed to recover and returned to his footballing activities soon thereafter, the only sportsman in the world to ever do so.

== Honours ==
=== Club ===
Corinthians

- Copa São Paulo de Futebol Júnior: 2012
