= Copa Santiago de Futebol Juvenil =

- Founded: 1989
- Region: Brazil
- Number of teams: 12
- Current champions: Palmeiras (2025)
- Most successful club(s): Internacional (14 times)

The Copa Santiago de Futebol Juvenil, formerly known as Torneio Romeu Goulart Jacques, is an under-17 football tournament played on annual basis in the Brazilian city of Santiago, Rio Grande do Sul. Entrant teams usually include Brazilian and foreign clubs, mostly from Mercosur countries.

The first edition occurred in 1989, promoted by Cruzeiro Esporte Clube, a local team that focuses on youth football. In 1993, the tournament was recognized by the Brazilian Football Confederation and, in 1994, by FIFA. In the same year, China's national U-17 team was the first non-South American side to take part in the competition.

In 2006, all matches were played at Estádio Alceu Carvalho.

== List of champions ==
Year	Winner	Runner-up
1989	(Uruguay); Nacional	(Brazil); Grêmio
1990	(Brazil); Internacional	(Brazil); Fluminense
1991	(Brazil); Matsubara	(Brazil); Grêmio
1992	(Brazil); Internacional	(Argentina); Independiente
1993	(Brazil); Internacional	(Brazil); Grêmio
1994	(Uruguay); Nacional	China national youth team
1995	(Brazil); Grêmio	(Brazil); Criciúma
1996	(Brazil); Grêmio	(Brazil); Internacional
1997	(Brazil); Grêmio	(Brazil); Criciúma
1998	(Brazil); Grêmio	(Brazil); Criciúma
1999	(Brazil); Fluminense	(Brazil); Juventus-SP
2000	(Brazil); Grêmio	(Brazil); Cruzeiro
2001	(Brazil); Internacional	(Brazil); Grêmio
2002	(Brazil); Cruzeiro	(Brazil); Vitória
2003	(Brazil); Internacional	(Brazil); Atlético Paranaense
2004	(Brazil); Cruzeiro	(Brazil); Vitória
2005	(Brazil); Internacional	(Brazil); Grêmio
2006	(Brazil); Atlético Mineiro	(Brazil); Atlético Paranaense
2007	(Brazil); Internacional	(Brazil); Goiás
2008	(Brazil); Grêmio	(Brazil); Internacional
2009	(Brazil); Internacional	(Brazil); América-MG
2010	(Brazil); Internacional	(Brazil); Gama
2011	(Brazil); Internacional	(Uruguay); Danubio
2012	(Brazil); Internacional	(Brazil); Palmeiras
2013	(Brazil); Internacional	(Brazil); Criciúma
2014	(Brazil); Internacional	(Brazil); Corinthians
2015	(Ecuador); Independiente del Valle	(Brazil); Avaí
2016	(Brazil); Cruzeiro de Santiago	(Brazil); São Paulo
2017	(Brazil); Internacional	(Brazil); Grêmio
2018	(Brazil); Palmeiras	(Brazil); Coritiba
2019	(Brazil); Grêmio	(Brazil); Palmeiras
2020	(Brazil); Palmeiras	(Brazil); Juventude
2025	(Brazil); Palmeiras	(Brazil); Grêmio

== Titles by team ==
- Internacional 14 titles
- Grêmio 7 titles
- Cruzeiro 2 titles
- Nacional (Uruguay) 2 titles
- Palmeiras 2 titles
- Atlético Mineiro 1 title
- Cruzeiro de Santiago 1 title
- Fluminense 1 title
- Independiente del Valle 1 title
- Matsubara 1 title
