= 1998 Copa CONMEBOL =

Tournament details
- Teams: 16 (from 10 confederations)

Final positions
- Champions: (Brazil) Santos (1st title)
- Runners-up: (Argentina) Rosario Central

Tournament statistics
- Matches played: 26
- Top scorer(s): (Uruguay) Carlos María Morales (Brazil) Viola (4 goals each)

The 1998 Copa CONMEBOL was the seventh edition of CONMEBOL's annual club tournament. Teams that failed to qualify for the Copa Libertadores played in this tournament. Sixteen teams from the ten South American football confederations qualified for this tournament. Santos defeated Rosario Central in the finals.

== Qualified teams ==
Qualified teams
(Brazil) Santos	(Venezuela) Deportivo Chacao	(Argentina) Rosario Central	(Bolivia) Jorge Wilstermann
(Brazil) Atlético Mineiro	(Brazil) Sampaio Corrêa	(Argentina) Gimnasia y Esgrima	(Brazil) América (RN)
(Chile) Audax Italiano	(Colombia) Once Caldas	(Colombia) Deportes Quindío	(Ecuador) LDU Quito
(Peru) Melgar	(Paraguay) Cerro Corá	(Uruguay) Huracán Buceo	(Uruguay) River Plate

== Bracket ==
First round
(Brazil) Santos	2	1	3 (3)
(Colombia) Once Caldas	1	2	3 (2)
(Peru) Melgar	1	1	2
(Ecuador) LDU Quito	3	3	6
(Brazil) Sampaio Corrêa	0	3	3
(Brazil) América (RN)	0	1	1
(Colombia) Deportes Quindío	2	2	4
(Venezuela) Deportivo Chacao	2	1	3
(Chile) Audax Italiano	0	1	1
(Argentina) Rosario Central	2	0	2
(Uruguay) Huracán Buceo	0	4	4
(Uruguay) River Plate	0	1	1
(Paraguay) Cerro Corá	2	0	2 (2)
(Brazil) Atlético Mineiro	2	0	2 (4)
(Bolivia) Jorge Wilstermann	0	1	1 (4)
(Argentina) Gimnasia y Esgrima	0	1	1 (2)

Quarterfinals
(Brazil) Santos	2	3	5
(Ecuador) LDU Quito	2	0	2
(Brazil) Sampaio Corrêa	1	1	2
(Colombia) Deportes Quindío	0	0	0
(Argentina) Rosario Central	3	2	5
(Uruguay) Huracán Buceo	2	0	2
(Brazil) Atlético Mineiro	3	0	3
(Bolivia) Jorge Wilstermann	1	1	2

Semifinals
(Brazil) Santos	0	5	5
(Brazil) Sampaio Corrêa	0	1	1
(Argentina) Rosario Central	1	1	2
(Brazil) Atlético Mineiro	1	0	1

Finals
(Brazil) Santos	1	0	1
(Argentina) Rosario Central	0	0	0

== First round ==
Team 1	Agg.	Team 2	1st leg	2nd leg
Santos (Brazil)	3–3 (3–2 p)	(Colombia) Once Caldas	2–1	1–2
LDU Quito (Ecuador)	6–2	(Peru) Melgar	3–1	3–1
Sampaio Corrêa (Brazil)	3–1	(Brazil) América (RN)	0–0	3–1
Deportes Quindío (Colombia)	4–3	(Venezuela) Deportivo Chacao	2–2	2–1
Audax Italiano (Chile)	1–2	(Argentina) Rosario Central	0–2	1–0
Huracán Buceo (Uruguay)	4–1	(Uruguay) River Plate	0–0	4–1
Cerro Corá (Paraguay)	2–2 (2–4 p)	(Brazil) Atlético Mineiro	2–2	0–0
Jorge Wilstermann (Bolivia)	1–1 (4–2 p)	(Argentina) Gimnasia y Esgrima	0–0	1–1

== Quarterfinals ==
Team 1	Agg.	Team 2	1st leg	2nd leg
Santos (Brazil)	5–2	(Ecuador) LDU Quito	2–2	3–0
Deportes Quindío (Colombia)	0–2	(Brazil) Sampaio Corrêa	0–1	0–1
Rosario Central (Argentina)	5–2	(Uruguay) Huracán Buceo	3–2	2–0
Atlético Mineiro (Brazil)	4–1	(Bolivia) Jorge Wilstermann	3–1	1–0

== Semifinals ==
Team 1	Agg.	Team 2	1st leg	2nd leg
Santos (Brazil)	5–1	(Brazil) Sampaio Corrêa	0–0	5–1
Rosario Central (Argentina)	2–1	(Brazil) Atlético Mineiro	1–1	1–0

== Finals ==
Team 1	Agg.	Team 2	1st leg	2nd leg
Santos (Brazil)	1–0	(Argentina) Rosario Central	1–0	0–0
