= 2001 Santos FC season =

Santos
2001 season
- President: Marcelo Teixeira
- Coach: Geninho; Serginho Chulapa; Cabralzinho
- Stadium: Vila Belmiro
- Campeonato Brasileiro: 15th
- Campeonato Paulista: Semi-finals
- Copa do Brasil: Second round
- Torneio Rio-São Paulo: Semi-finals
- Top goalscorer: League: Viola (12); All: Dodô (14)

The 2001 season was Santos Futebol Clube's eighty-ninth in existence and the club's forty-second consecutive season in the top flight of Brazilian football.

== Players ==
=== Squad ===
Note: Flags indicate national team as defined under FIFA eligibility rules; some limited exceptions apply. Players may hold more than one non-FIFA nationality.

| No. | Pos. | Nation | Player |
|---|---|---|---|
| — | GK | BRA | Fábio Costa |
| — | GK | BRA | Pitarelli |
| — | GK | BRA | Rafael |
| — | DF | BRA | Cléber |
| — | DF | ARG | Galván |
| — | DF | BRA | Leandro Luz |
| — | DF | BRA | Léo |
| — | DF | BRA | Orestes |
| — | DF | BRA | Pereira |
| — | DF | BRA | Preto |
| — | DF | BRA | Rodrigo Costa |
| — | DF | BRA | Russo |
| — | DF | BRA | Valdir |
| — | MF | BRA | Aílton |

| No. | Pos. | Nation | Player |
|---|---|---|---|
| — | MF | BRA | Canindé |
| — | MF | BRA | Elano |
| — | MF | BRA | Marcelo Silva |
| — | MF | BRA | Paulo Almeida |
| — | MF | BRA | Renato |
| — | MF | BRA | Robert |
| — | MF | BRA | Vágner |
| — | MF | BRA | Válber |
| — | FW | BRA | André |
| — | FW | BRA | Marcelinho Carioca |
| — | FW | BRA | Viola |
| — | FW | BRA | Weldon |
| — | FW | BRA | William |

Source: Acervo Santista

=== Statistics ===
==== Appearances and goals ====
| Pos. | Nat | Name | Campeonato Brasileiro | | Campeonato Paulista | | Copa do Brasil | | Torneio Rio-São Paulo | | Total | |
| Pos. | Nat | Name | Apps | Goals | Apps | Goals | Apps | Goals | Apps | Goals | Apps | Goals |
|---|---|---|---|---|---|---|---|---|---|---|---|---|
| GK | (Brazil) | Fábio Costa | 20 | 0 | 16 | 0 | 3 | 0 | 6 | 0 | 45 | 0 |
| GK | (Brazil) | Pitarelli | 7(2) | 0 | 1 | 0 | 1 | 0 | 0 | 0 | 11 | 0 |
| GK | (Brazil) | Rafael | 0(1) | 0 | 0 (1) | 0 | 0 | 0 | 0 | 0 | 2 | 0 |
| DF | (Brazil) | Cléber | 22 | 3 | 0 | 0 | 0 | 0 | 0 | 0 | 22 | 3 |
| DF | (Argentina) | Galván | 20 | 1 | 15 | 1 | 3 (1) | 0 | 5 | 0 | 44 | 2 |
| DF | (Brazil) | Leandro Luz | 3(2) | 0 | 0 | 0 | 0 | 0 | 0 | 0 | 5 | 0 |
| DF | (Brazil) | Léo | 17 | 0 | 14 | 1 | 4 | 0 | 6 | 1 | 41 | 2 |
| DF | (Brazil) | Orestes | 4(2) | 0 | 0 | 0 | 0 | 0 | 0 | 0 | 6 | 0 |
| DF | (Brazil) | Pereira | 3(5) | 0 | 9 (1) | 0 | 2 | 0 | 5 | 1 | 24 | 1 |
| DF | (Brazil) | Preto | 25 | 0 | 0 | 0 | 0 | 0 | 0 | 0 | 25 | 0 |
| DF | (Brazil) | Rodrigo Costa | 0 | 0 | 1 (1) | 0 | 0 | 0 | 0 | 0 | 2 | 0 |
| DF | (Brazil) | Russo | 20 | 2 | 16 | 0 | 4 | 1 | 4 | 0 | 44 | 3 |
| DF | (Brazil) | Valdir | 7(4) | 1 | 0 | 0 | 0 | 0 | 0 | 0 | 11 | 1 |
| MF | (Brazil) | Canindé | 11(4) | 1 | 0 (1) | 0 | 0 | 0 | 0 | 0 | 16 | 1 |
| MF | (Brazil) | Elano | 8(17) | 2 | 1 (4) | 1 | 0 (2) | 0 | 0 (2) | 0 | 34 | 3 |
| MF | (Brazil) | Marcelo Silva | 15(2) | 1 | 6 (8) | 2 | 0 | 0 | 2 (2) | 0 | 35 | 3 |
| MF | (Brazil) | Paulo Almeida | 18(2) | 0 | 7 (3) | 0 | 4 | 0 | 1 | 0 | 35 | 0 |
| MF | (Brazil) | Renato | 19(5) | 1 | 15 | 3 | 3 (1) | 1 | 6 | 1 | 49 | 6 |
| MF | (Brazil) | Robert | 21 | 5 | 14 | 3 | 3 | 0 | 6 | 1 | 44 | 9 |
| MF | (Brazil) | Vágner | 3(4) | 1 | 0 | 0 | 0 | 0 | 0 | 0 | 7 | 1 |
| MF | (Brazil) | Válber | 8 | 1 | 0 | 0 | 0 | 0 | 0 | 0 | 8 | 1 |
| FW | (Brazil) | André Dias | 0(2) | 0 | 0 | 0 | 0 | 0 | 0 | 0 | 2 | 0 |
| FW | (Brazil) | Marcelinho Carioca | 15 | 5 | 0 | 0 | 0 | 0 | 0 | 0 | 15 | 5 |
| FW | (Brazil) | Viola | 24 | 12 | 0 | 0 | 0 | 0 | 0 | 0 | 24 | 12 |
| FW | (Brazil) | Weldon | 3(8) | 1 | 0 | 0 | 0 | 0 | 0 | 0 | 11 | 1 |
| FW | (Brazil) | William | 0(4) | 0 | 0 | 0 | 0 | 0 | 0 | 0 | 4 | 0 |
Players who left the club during the season
| DF | (Brazil) | André Luís | 0 | 0 | 10 (3) | 1 | 3 | 0 | 5 | 0 | 21 | 1 |
| DF | (Brazil) | Claudiomiro | 0 | 0 | 13 | 1 | 2 | 0 | 6 | 1 | 21 | 2 |
| DF | (Brazil) | Dutra | 0 | 0 | 2 (1) | 0 | 0 (1) | 0 | 0 (1) | 0 | 4 | 0 |
| DF | (Brazil) | Jean | 0 | 0 | 1 | 0 | 1 | 0 | 0 | 0 | 2 | 0 |
| DF | (Brazil) | Michel | 0 | 0 | 2 (2) | 0 | 0 | 0 | 2 | 0 | 6 | 0 |
| MF | (Brazil) | Aílton | 0 | 0 | 0 | 0 | 0 | 0 | 0 (1) | 0 | 1 | 0 |
| MF | (Brazil) | Caíco | 0 | 0 | 3 (6) | 0 | 1 | 2 | 0 (4) | 0 | 14 | 2 |
| MF | (Colombia) | Rincón | 0 | 0 | 7 | 1 | 2 | 0 | 0 | 0 | 9 | 1 |
| FW | (Brazil) | Caio | 0 | 0 | 2 (5) | 2 | 1 (2) | 0 | 1 | 0 | 11 | 2 |
| FW | (Brazil) | Deivid | 0 | 0 | 13 (4) | 8 | 4 | 0 | 2 (3) | 2 | 26 | 10 |
| FW | (Brazil) | Dodô | 0 | 0 | 11 (2) | 10 | 2 (1) | 1 | 5 | 3 | 21 | 14 |
| FW | (Brazil) | Júlio César | 4(5) | 0 | 0 (5) | 0 | 0 (1) | 0 | 0 (1) | 0 | 17 | 0 |
| FW | (Brazil) | Rodrigão | 0 | 0 | 8 (3) | 5 | 1 (2) | 2 | 4 (1) | 3 | 19 | 10 |

Source: Match reports in Competitive matches

==== Goalscorers ====
| Ran | Pos | Nat | Name | Brasileirão | Copa do Brasil | Paulistão | Rio-SP | Total |
|---|---|---|---|---|---|---|---|---|
| 1 | FW | (Brazil) | Dodô | 0 | 1 | 10 | 3 | 14 |
| 2 | FW | (Brazil) | Viola | 12 | 0 | 0 | 0 | 12 |
| 3 | FW | (Brazil) | Deivid | 0 | 0 | 8 | 2 | 10 |
| 3 | FW | (Brazil) | Rodrigão | 0 | 2 | 5 | 3 | 10 |
| 4 | MF | (Brazil) | Robert | 5 | 0 | 3 | 1 | 9 |
| 5 | MF | (Brazil) | Renato | 1 | 1 | 3 | 1 | 6 |
| 6 | FW | (Brazil) | Marcelinho Carioca | 5 | 0 | 0 | 0 | 5 |
| 7 | DF | (Brazil) | Cléber | 3 | 0 | 0 | 0 | 3 |
| 7 | DF | (Brazil) | Russo | 2 | 1 | 0 | 0 | 3 |
| 7 | MF | (Brazil) | Elano | 2 | 0 | 1 | 0 | 3 |
| 7 | MF | (Brazil) | Marcelo Silva | 1 | 0 | 2 | 0 | 3 |
| 8 | DF | (Brazil) | Claudiomiro | 0 | 0 | 1 | 1 | 2 |
| 8 | DF | (Brazil) | Léo | 0 | 0 | 1 | 1 | 2 |
| 8 | FW | (Brazil) | Caíco | 0 | 2 | 0 | 0 | 2 |
| 8 | FW | (Brazil) | Caio | 0 | 0 | 2 | 0 | 2 |
| 9 | FW | (Brazil) | Weldon | 1 | 0 | 0 | 0 | 1 |
| 9 | MF | (Brazil) | Vágner | 1 | 0 | 0 | 0 | 1 |
| 9 | DF | (Brazil) | Valdir | 1 | 0 | 0 | 0 | 1 |
| 9 | DF | (Argentina) | Galván | 1 | 0 | 1 | 0 | 1 |
| 9 | MF | (Brazil) | Canindé | 1 | 0 | 0 | 0 | 1 |
| 9 | MF | (Brazil) | Válber | 1 | 0 | 0 | 0 | 1 |
| 9 | DF | (Brazil) | André Luís | 0 | 0 | 1 | 0 | 1 |
| 9 | MF | (Colombia) | Rincón | 0 | 0 | 1 | 0 | 1 |
| 9 | DF | (Brazil) | Pereira | 0 | 0 | 0 | 1 | 1 |

Source: Match reports in Competitive matches

== Transfers ==
=== In ===
| Pos. | Name | Moving from | Source | Notes |
|---|---|---|---|---|
| MF | (Brazil) Caíco | Atlético Mineiro | | Loan return |
| DF | (Brazil) Dutra | Sport | | Loan return |
| DF | (Brazil) Russo | Sport | | |
| FW | (Brazil) Rodrigão | Internacional | | Loan return |
| DF | (Brazil) Jean | Bahia | | Loan return |
| DF | (Brazil) Rodrigo Costa | Grêmio | | On loan |
| MF | (Brazil) Marcos Bazílio | Portuguesa Santista | | Loan return |
| DF | (Brazil) Valdir | Portuguesa Santista | | Loan return |
| FW | (Brazil) Weldon | Brasiliense | | Loan return |
| DF | (Brazil) Orestes | Portuguesa Santista | | On loan |
| FW | (Brazil) Viola | Vasco | | |
| MF | (Brazil) Válber | Vasco | | On loan |
| MF | (Brazil) Vágner | Bahia | | On loan |
| DF | (Brazil) Cléber | Cruzeiro | | |
| MF | (Brazil) Marcelinho Carioca | Corinthians | | |

=== Out ===
| Pos. | Name | Moving to | Source | Notes |
|---|---|---|---|---|
| GK | (Brazil) Nei | Coritiba | | |
| FW | (Brazil) Edmundo | Vasco | | Loan return |
| MF | (Brazil) Valdo | Free agent | | |
| MF | (Brazil) Fumagalli | Guarani | | |
| MF | (Brazil) Anderson Luiz | Internacional | | Loan return |
| GK | (Brazil) Nando | São José | | |
| DF | (Brazil) Rubens Cardoso | Grêmio | | |
| DF | (Brazil) Sangaletti | Náutico | | |
| MF | (Brazil) Eduardo Marques | Sport | | |
| GK | (Brazil) Carlos Germano | Portuguesa | | |
| DF | (Brazil) Márcio Santos | Gama | | |
| FW | (Brazil) Gauchinho | (Bulgaria) Levski Sofia | | |
| MF | (Brazil) Wellington | Brasiliense | | On loan |
| FW | (Brazil) Weldon | Brasiliense | | On loan |
| DF | (Brazil) Dutra | Sport | | On loan |
| MF | (Brazil) Aílton | (Japan) Kawasaki Frontale | | |
| FW | (Brazil) Caio | Fluminense | | |
| DF | (Brazil) André Luís | Fluminense | | On loan |
| MF | (Colombia) Rincón | Cruzeiro | | |
| FW | (Brazil) Rodrigão | (France) Saint-Étienne | | |
| DF | (Brazil) Claudiomiro | Grêmio | | |
| DF | (Brazil) Michel | Vitória | | On loan |
| MF | (Brazil) Caíco | (Switzerland) Lugano | | |
| MF | (Brazil) Marcos Bazílio | Bahia | | On loan |
| DF | (Brazil) Jean | Bahia | | On loan |
| FW | (Brazil) Deivid | Corinthians | | |
| DF | (Brazil) Dutra | (Japan) Yokohama Marinos | | |
| FW | (Brazil) Dodô | Botafogo | | |
| FW | (Brazil) Júlio César | (Turkey) Gaziantepspor | | On loan |

== Friendlies ==
| 20 May Friendly | Ilhwa Chunma (South Korea) | 1 – 2 | Santos | Daegu |
| | Kin Yong-soo 82' | Report | 57' Caíco; 63' Adiel | Stadium: Daegu World Cup Stadium; Attendance: 65,000 |

| 13 July Copa Nike | Atlas (Mexico) | 2 – 0 | Santos | Guadalajara |
| | Lavallén 16'; Calderón 61' | Report | | Stadium: Jalisco; Attendance: 18,000; Referee: Germán Arredondo |

| 15 July Copa Nike | América (Mexico) | 1 – 1 (4–2 p) | Santos | Guadalajara |
| | Oviedo 89' | Report | 88' Weldon | Stadium: Jalisco; Attendance: 10,000; Referee: Jorge Eduardo Gasso |
| | Penalties |
| | Pardo (penalty scored); Oviedo (penalty scored); Patiño (penalty scored); Davino (penalty scored) | | (penalty scored) Galván; (penalty scored) Michel; (penalty missed) Claudiomiro; (penalty missed) Adiel |

| 25 July Friendly | Ituano | 1 – 2 | Santos | Itu |
| | Wesley | Report | Júlio César; Valdir | Stadium: Novelli Júnior |

| 28 July Friendly | São Caetano | 0 – 1 | Santos | São Caetano do Sul |
| | | Report | 54' Júlio César | Stadium: Anacleto Campanella; Referee: Silvio César Tallarico |

| 21 October Friendly | Amparo | 0 – 5 | Santos | Amparo |
| | | Report | Galván; Viola; Elano; Renato | Stadium: Chico Vieira |

== Competitions ==
=== Overall summary ===
| Competition | Started round | Final position / round | First match | Last match |
|---|---|---|---|---|
| Campeonato Brasileiro | — | 15th | 2 August | 2 December |
| Campeonato Paulista | First stage | Semi-finals | 21 January | 13 May |
| Copa do Brasil | First round | Second round | 14 March | 18 April |
| Torneio Rio-São Paulo | Group stage | 3rd | 17 January | 21 February |

Source: Competitions

=== Campeonato Brasileiro ===
==== Results summary ====
| Overall | | | | | | | | Home | | | | | | Away | | | | | |
| Pld | W | D | L | GF | GA | GD | Pts | W | D | L | GF | GA | GD | W | D | L | GF | GA | GD |
|---|---|---|---|---|---|---|---|---|---|---|---|---|---|---|---|---|---|---|---|
| 27 | 9 | 9 | 9 | 37 | 32 | +5 | 36 | 6 | 4 | 4 | 27 | 18 | +9 | 3 | 5 | 5 | 10 | 14 | −4 |

Source: Futpédia

==== Results by round ====
| Round | 1 | 2 | 3 | 4 | 5 | 6 | 7 | 8 | 9 | 10 | 11 | 12 | 13 | 14 | 15 | 16 | 17 | 18 | 19 | 20 | 21 | 22 | 23 | 24 | 25 | 26 | 27 |
|---|---|---|---|---|---|---|---|---|---|---|---|---|---|---|---|---|---|---|---|---|---|---|---|---|---|---|---|
| Ground | H | A | A | H | A | H | H | A | H | A | A | H | A | H | A | H | H | A | A | H | H | A | H | A | H | A | H |
| Result | D | D | D | W | W | D | D | D | L | L | D | W | W | W | L | W | L | L | W | L | W | D | W | L | L | L | D |
| Position | 10 | 15 | 18 | 11 | 8 | 10 | 10 | 12 | 15 | 17 | 16 | 10 | 7 | 11 | 7 | 9 | 13 | 9 | 11 | 14 | 10 | 11 | 10 | 12 | 13 | 15 | 15 |

Source: Futpédia
W = Win; D = Draw; L = Loss

==== First stage ====
===== League table =====
| Pos | Team | Pld | W | D | L | GF | GA | GD | Pts | Qualification |
|---|---|---|---|---|---|---|---|---|---|---|
| 13 | Portuguesa | 27 | 11 | 4 | 12 | 31 | 33 | −2 | 37 | Intermediate zone |
| 14 | Paraná | 27 | 11 | 3 | 13 | 35 | 37 | −2 | 36 | Intermediate zone |
| 15 | Santos | 27 | 9 | 9 | 9 | 37 | 32 | +5 | 36 | Intermediate zone |
| 16 | Vitória | 27 | 9 | 9 | 9 | 33 | 37 | −4 | 36 | Intermediate zone |
| 17 | Coritiba | 27 | 9 | 8 | 10 | 31 | 32 | −1 | 35 | Intermediate zone |

===== Matches =====
| 2 August 1 | Santos | 1 – 1 | Santa Cruz | Santos |
| 20:30 | Weldon 75' | Report | 84' Luizinho Vieira | Stadium: Vila Belmiro; Attendance: 9,545; Referee: Edilson Soares da Silva (RJ) |

| 5 August 2 | Vitória | 1 – 1 | Santos | Salvador |
| 16:00 | Marcos 56' | Report | 5' Robert | Stadium: Barradão; Attendance: 7,268; Referee: Jamir Carlos Garcez (DF) |

| 8 August 3 | Gama | 1 – 1 | Santos | Brasília |
| 20:30 | Lindomar 55' (pen.) | Report | 11' Renato | Stadium: Mané Garrincha; Attendance: 5,106; Referee: Getúlio Barbosa Souza Lima Júnior (MS) |

| 12 August 4 | Santos | 2 – 0 | Coritiba | Santos |
| 16:00 | Robert 15' (pen.), 67' | Report | | Stadium: Vila Belmiro; Attendance: 8,122; Referee: Jorge Travassos Errado (RJ) |

| 16 August 5 | Botafogo–SP | 0 – 1 | Santos | Ribeirão Preto |
| 20:30 | | Report | 65' Elano | Stadium: Santa Cruz; Attendance: 7,419; Referee: Paulo César de Oliveira (SP) |

| 19 August 6 | Santos | 0 – 0 | Botafogo | Santos |
| 16:00 | | Report | | Stadium: Vila Belmiro; Attendance: 11,941; Referee: Carlos Eugênio Simon (RS) |

| 26 August 7 | Santos | 2 – 2 | Juventude | Santos |
| 16:00 | Vágner 1'; Valdir 28' | Report | 13' (pen.) Fernando; 88' Leonardo Manzi | Stadium: Vila Belmiro; Attendance: 7,926; Referee: Giuliano Bozzano (RS) |

| 29 August 8 | Atlético Paranaense | 1 – 1 | Santos | Curitiba |
| 20:30 | Daniel 85' | Report | 90+2' Viola | Stadium: Arena da Baixada; Attendance: 6,410; Referee: Leonardo Gaciba (SP) |

| 2 September 9 | Santos | 1 – 2 | Goiás | Santos |
| 15:00 | Robert 17' (pen.) | Report | 12' Roni; 25' Danilo | Stadium: Vila Belmiro; Attendance: 8,458; Referee: Fabiano Gonçalves (RS) |

| 6 September 10 | Flamengo | 2 – 0 | Santos | Taguatinga |
| 20:00 | Roma 31'; Reinaldo 90' | Report | | Stadium: Boca do Jacaré; Attendance: 7,401; Referee: Wilson de Souza Mendonça (PE) |

| 9 September 11 | Guarani | 1 – 1 | Santos | Campinas |
| 15:00 | Élder 57' | Report | 55' (pen.) Marcelinho Carioca | Stadium: Brinco de Ouro; Attendance: 7,787; Referee: Romildo Correia (SP) |

| 16 September 12 | Santos | 3 – 0 | América Mineiro | Santos |
| 15:00 | Viola 38', 64'; Marcelinho Carioca 85' | Report | | Stadium: Vila Belmiro; Attendance: 9,454; Referee: Léo Feldman (RJ) |

| 19 September 13 | Sport | 0 – 2 | Santos | Recife |
| 20:30 | | Report | 17' Robert; 64' Viola | Stadium: Ilha do Retiro; Attendance: 6,658; Referee: Antônio Pereira da Silva (GO) |

| 23 September 14 | Santos | 5 – 1 | Bahia | Santos |
| 15:00 | Viola 3', 32', 42'; Cléber 45'; Russo 73' | Report | 63' (pen.) Róbson | Stadium: Vila Belmiro; Referee: Carlos Eugênio Simon (RS) |

| 29 September 15 | Paraná | 1 – 0 | Santos | Curitiba |
| 15:30 | Maurílio 77' | Report | | Stadium: Durival Britto; Attendance: 6,498; Referee: Wagner Azevedo Tardelli (RJ) |

| 3 October 16 | Santos | 1 – 0 | São Paulo | Santos |
| 21:45 | Viola 14' (pen.) | Report | | Stadium: Vila Belmiro; Referee: Cléber Wellington Abade (SP) |

| 6 October 17 | Santos | 1 – 2 | São Caetano | Santos |
| 16:00 | Viola 44' (pen.) | Report | 14' (pen.), 18' Magrão | Stadium: Vila Belmiro; Referee: Paulo Cesar de Oliveira (SP) |

| 10 October 18 | Palmeiras | 2 – 1 | Santos | São Paulo |
| 15:00 | Taddei 43'; Edmilson 82' | Report | 86' Cléber | Stadium: Palestra Itália; Referee: Luís Marcelo Cancian |

| 13 October 19 | Atlético Mineiro | 0 – 1 | Santos | Belo Horizonte |
| 16:00 | | Report | 61' Galván | Stadium: Mineirão; Attendance: 73,468; Referee: Léo Feldman (RJ) |

| 28 October 20 | Santos | 0 – 2 | Corinthians | Santos |
| 16:00 | | Report | 65' (pen.) Luizão; 90+2' (o.g.) Galván | Stadium: Vila Belmiro; Referee: Paulo Cesar de Oliveira (SP) |

| 4 November 21 | Santos | 4 – 2 | Grêmio | Santos |
| 16:00 | Marcelinho Carioca 8', 32'; Viola 19'; Canindé 24' | Report | 34' Luís Mário; 66' Fábio de los Santos | Stadium: Vila Belmiro; Attendance: 6,231; Referee: Luciano Augusto Almeida (DF) |

| 8 November 22 | Portuguesa | 0 – 0 | Santos | São Paulo |
| 20:30 | | Report | | Stadium: Canindé; Attendance: 20,305; Referee: Cleber Wellington Abade (SP) |

| 11 November 23 | Santos | 4 – 2 | Cruzeiro | Santos |
| 16:00 | Viola 25', 59'; Marcelinho Carioca 30'; Elano 75' | Report | 24' Alex; 84' Oséas | Stadium: Vila Belmiro; Attendance: 7,818; Referee: Héber Roberto Lopes (PR) |

| 15 November 24 | Internacional | 3 – 0 | Santos | Porto Alegre |
| 17:00 | Luiz Cláudio 21'; Carlinhos 79' (pen.); Jackson 90+2' | Report | | Stadium: Beira Rio; Referee: Álvaro Azeredo Quelhas |

| 18 November 25 | Santos | 1 – 2 | Ponte Preta | Santos |
| 16:00 | Russo 18' | Report | 28' (pen.) Washington; 90+2' Adrianinho | Stadium: Vila Belmiro; Referee: Edílson Pereira de Carvalho (SP) |

| 24 November 26 | Fluminense | 2 – 1 | Santos | Rio de Janeiro |
| 16:00 | André Luís 2', 75' | Report | 72' Cléber | Stadium: Maracanã; Attendance: 20,561; Referee: Héber Roberto Lopes (PR) |

| 2 December 27 | Santos | 2 – 2 | Vasco | Santos |
| 16:00 | Marcelo Silva 76'; Válber 77' | Report | 34' (pen.) Gilberto; 69' Dedé | Stadium: Vila Belmiro; Referee: Lourival Dias Lima Filho (BA) |

=== Copa do Brasil ===
==== First round ====
| 14 March First leg | Anapolina | 1 – 2 | Santos | Anápolis |
| 20:30 | Baiano 27' | Report | 60' Dodô; 80' Renato | Stadium: Jonas Duarte; Referee: Jamir Carlos Garcez (DF) |

| 21 March Second leg | Santos | 5 – 1 (7 – 2 agg.) | Anapolina | Santos |
| 20:30 | Rodrigão 9', 21'; Caíco 54', 64'; Russo 86' | Report | 55' Leonardo de Oliveira | Stadium: Vila Belmiro; Referee: Evandro Rogério Roman (PR) |

==== Second round ====
| 11 April First leg | Bahia | 2 – 0 | Santos | Salvador |
| 21:40 | Nonato 24'; Róbson 59' | Report | | Stadium: Fonte Nova; Referee: Antônio Pereira da Silva (GO) |

| 18 April Second leg | Santos | 0 – 2 (0 – 4 agg.) | Bahia | Santos |
| 21:40 | | Report | 79', 84' Alex Oliveira | Stadium: Vila Belmiro; Referee: Léo Feldman (RJ) |

=== Campeonato Paulista ===
==== First stage ====
===== League table =====
| Pos | Team | Pld | W | PWG | PWL | PLG | PLL | L | GF | GA | GD | Pts |
|---|---|---|---|---|---|---|---|---|---|---|---|---|
| 1 | Ponte Preta | 15 | 9 | 1 | 0 | 2 | 1 | 2 | 26 | 16 | +10 | 31 |
| 2 | Santos | 15 | 9 | 1 | 0 | 0 | 0 | 5 | 37 | 24 | +13 | 29 |
| 3 | Corinthians | 15 | 8 | 0 | 0 | 2 | 0 | 5 | 39 | 27 | +12 | 26 |
| 4 | Botafogo | 15 | 5 | 5 | 0 | 1 | 0 | 4 | 23 | 25 | −2 | 26 |
| 5 | São Caetano | 15 | 6 | 3 | 0 | 1 | 0 | 5 | 29 | 22 | +7 | 25 |

===== Matches =====
| 21 January 1 | Santos | 1 – 0 | Guarani | Santos |
| | Claudiomiro 88' | Report | | Stadium: Vila Belmiro; Referee: João Luis dos Santos and Romildo Corrêa |

| 28 January 2 | Santos | 5 – 0 | Portuguesa Santista | Santos |
| | Deivid 5'; Léo 65'; Robert 83'; Rodrigão 85', 89' | Report | | Stadium: Vila Belmiro; Referee: Edilson Pereira de Carvalho and Tadeu Bosco da Cruz |

| 4 February 3 | São Paulo | 4 – 2 | Santos | São Paulo |
| 16:00 | Reginaldo 14'; Kaká 74'; Renatinho 80'; Gustavo Nery 90' | Report | 12', 88' Dodô | Stadium: Morumbi; Attendance: 14,149; Referee: Cleber Wellington Abade and Antônio Cláudio Perin |

| 11 February 4 | União Barbarense | 1 – 5 | Santos | Santa Barbara d'Oeste |
| 16:00 | Mauro 65' | Report | 42', 66' Rodrigão; 50' Dodô; 60' Marcelo Silva; 85' Deivid | Stadium: Antonio Lins Ribeiro Guimarães; Attendance: 7,049; Referee: Romildo Corrêa and Rogério Pereira Pires |

| 17 February 5 | Santos | 4 – 0 | Portuguesa | Santos |
| 16:00 | Dodô 6', 66'; Deivid 43'; Galván 78' | Report | | Stadium: Vila Belmiro; Referee: Edilson Pereira de Carvalho and Luciano Calabietto Quilichini |

| 24 February 6 | União São João | 1 – 1 (1–2 p) | Santos | Araras |
| 16:00 | Bernardi 74' | Report | 81' Dodô | Stadium: Doutor Hermínio Ometto; Referee: Cláudio Perin and Eduardo César Talarico |
| | Penalties |
| | Andrei (penalty scored); Mauro César (penalty missed); Júnior Amorim (penalty missed) | | (penalty missed) Robert; (penalty scored) Deivid; (penalty scored) Dodô |

| 3 March 7 | Rio Branco | 3 – 2 | Santos | Americana |
| 16:00 | Rafael 2', 31'; Marcus Vinícius 33' | Report | 49' André Luís; 70' Dodô | Stadium: Décio Vitta; Referee: Alfredo Loebeling and Tadeu Cruz |

| 11 March 8 | Botafogo–SP | 2 – 1 | Santos | Ribeirão Preto |
| 16:00 | Leandro 28', 51' | Report | 15' Deivid | Stadium: Santa Cruz; Attendance: 23,810; Referee: Paulo César de Oliveira and Anselmo da Costa |

| 18 March 9 | Corinthians | 5 – 0 | Santos | São Paulo |
| 16:00 | Marcelinho Carioca 3'; Luizão 40'; Éwerthon 56', 78'; Ricardinho 68' | Report | | Stadium: Pacaembu; Attendance: 24,291; Referee: Antônio Cláudio Perin and César Abade |

| 24 March 10 | Ponte Preta | 1 – 0 | Santos | Campinas |
| | Macedo 58' | Report | | Stadium: Moisés Lucarelli |

| 1 April 11 | Santos | 3 – 1 | Palmeiras | Santos |
| 16:00 | Caio 8'; Deivid 31'; Rodrigão 75' | Report | 61' Tuta | Stadium: Vila Belmiro; Attendance: 11,897; Referee: Paulo César de Oliveira and Romildo Corrêa |

| 7 April 12 | Matonense | 4 – 5 | Santos | Matão |
| | Paloma 56'; Marcelinho 58'; Careca 62', 65' | Report | 20', 36' Deivid; 45+1' Robert; 48' Caio; 83' Renato | Stadium: Hudson Ferreira |

| 15 April 13 | Inter de Limeira | 0 – 1 | Santos | Limeira |
| 16:00 | | Report | 45+2' Robert | Stadium: Major José Levy Sobrinho; Referee: Romildo Corrêa and Luis Marcelo Cansian |

| 21 April 14 | São Caetano | 1 – 2 | Santos | São Caetano do Sul |
| | Márcio Griggio 43' | Report | 12' Renato; 75' Rincón | Stadium: Anacletto Campanella; Referee: Alfredo Loebeling and João Luís dos Santos |

| 28 April 15 | Mogi Mirim | 1 – 5 | Santos | Mogi Mirim |
| | Jó 8' | Report | 16' Elano; 57', 68', 86' Dodô; 78' Marcelo Silva | Stadium: Wilson de Barros; Referee: Luiz Edmar Remondine and Edilson Pereira de Carvalho |

==== Knockout stage ====
===== Semi-finals =====
| 6 May First leg | Corinthians | 1 – 1 | Santos | São Paulo |
| 16:00 | Éwerthon 21' | Report | 21' Deivid | Stadium: Morumbi; Attendance: 65,793; Referee: Edilson Pereira de Carvalho and Roberto Pires |

| 13 May Second leg | Santos | 1 – 2 (2 – 3 agg.) | Corinthians | São Paulo |
| 16:00 | Renato 33' | Report | 35' Marcelinho Carioca; 90+3' Ricardinho | Stadium: Morumbi; Referee: Alfredo Loebeling and Salvío Spinola |

=== Torneiro Rio-São Paulo ===
==== Group stage ====
Group B
| Team | Pld | W | D | L | GF | GA | GD | Pts |
|---|---|---|---|---|---|---|---|---|
| Santos | 4 | 3 | 1 | 0 | 11 | 2 | +9 | 10 |
| São Paulo | 4 | 2 | 1 | 1 | 7 | 6 | +1 | 7 |
| Corinthians | 4 | 1 | 2 | 1 | 8 | 8 | 0 | 5 |
| Palmeiras | 4 | 1 | 1 | 2 | 3 | 6 | −3 | 4 |

Source: Bola na Área

| 17 January 1 | Flamengo | 0 – 3 | Santos | Nova Iguaçu |
| 20:30 | | Report | 20' Deivid; 76' Rodrigão; 88' Robert | Stadium: Giulite Coutinho; Referee: Cléber Wellington Abade (SP) |

| 25 January 2 | Santos | 3 – 0 | Botafogo | Santos |
| 20:30 | Pereira 7'; Léo 40'; Dodô 58' | Report | | Stadium: Vila Belmiro; Attendance: 4,886; Referee: Carlos Jorge Moreira (RJ) |

| 1 February 3 | Fluminense | 2 – 2 | Santos | Rio de Janeiro |
| 20:30 | Asprilla 22'; Agnaldo 74' | Report | 53' Dodô; 88' Claudiomiro | Stadium: Maracanã; Attendance: 23,584; Referee: Alfredo Loebeling (SP) |

| 7 February 4 | Santos | 3 – 0 | Vasco | Santos |
| 21:40 | Renato 66'; Rodrigão 70'; Deivid 76' | Report | | Stadium: Vila Belmiro; Attendance: 7,004; Referee: Vagner Tardelli de Azevedo (RJ) |

==== Knockout stage ====
===== Semi-finals =====
| 14 February First leg | Botafogo | 2 – 2 | Santos | Rio de Janeiro |
| 21:40 | Donizete 3'; Taílson 77' | Report | 48' Dodô; 54' Rodrigão | Stadium: Maracanã; Referee: Edílson Pereira de Carvalho (SP) |

| 21 February Second leg | Santos | 0 – 1 (2 – 3 agg.) | Botafogo | Santos |
| 21:40 | | Report | 89' Taílson | Stadium: Vila Belmiro; Referee: Amaurilio Macareth Sá Leão (RJ) |
