= 2000 Santos FC season =

Santos
2000 season
- President: Marcelo Teixeira
- Coach: Carlos Alberto Silva; Giba; Carlos Alberto Parreira
- Stadium: Vila Belmiro
- Copa João Havelange: 18th
- Campeonato Paulista: Runners-up
- Copa do Brasil: Semi-finals
- Torneio Rio-São Paulo: Group stage
- Top goalscorer: League: Edmundo (13); All: Dodô (27)

The 2000 season was Santos Futebol Clube's eighty-eighth in existence and the club's forty-first consecutive season in the top flight of Brazilian football.

== Players ==
=== Squad ===
Note: Flags indicate national team as defined under FIFA eligibility rules; some limited exceptions apply. Players may hold more than one non-FIFA nationality.

No.	Pos.	Nation	Player
—	GK	BRA	Carlos Germano
—	GK	BRA	Fábio Costa
—	GK	BRA	Pitarelli
—	DF	BRA	André Luís
—	DF	BRA	Claudiomiro
—	DF	ARG	Galván
—	DF	BRA	Léo
—	DF	BRA	Michel
—	DF	BRA	Márcio Santos
—	DF	BRA	Pereira
—	DF	BRA	Preto
—	DF	BRA	Rubens Cardoso
—	DF	BRA	Sangaletti
—	MF	BRA	Aílton
—	MF	BRA	Anderson Luiz
—	MF	BRA	Canindé

No.	Pos.	Nation	Player
—	MF	BRA	Eduardo Marques
—	MF	BRA	Marcelo Silva
—	MF	BRA	Paulo Almeida
—	MF	BRA	Renato
—	MF	COL	Rincón
—	MF	BRA	Robert
—	MF	BRA	Valdo
—	MF	BRA	Wellington
—	FW	BRA	Caio
—	FW	BRA	Deivid
—	FW	BRA	Dodô
—	FW	BRA	Edmundo
—	FW	BRA	Gaúcho
—	FW	BRA	Júlio César
—	FW	BRA	Weldon

Source: Acervo Santista

=== Statistics ===
==== Appearances and goals ====
Pos.	Nat	Name	Copa João Havelange		Campeonato Paulista		Copa do Brasil		Torneio Rio-São Paulo		Total	
Pos.	Nat	Name	Apps	Goals	Apps	Goals	Apps	Goals	Apps	Goals	Apps	Goals
GK	(Brazil)	Carlos Germano	11	0	18	0	7	0	0	0	36	0
GK	(Brazil)	Fábio Costa	1	0	2	0	2	0	0	0	5	0
GK	(Brazil)	Nei	0	0	0	0	0	0	6	0	6	0
GK	(Brazil)	Pitarelli	12 (1)	0	0	0	0	0	0	0	13	0
DF	(Brazil)	André Luís	12	1	8 (1)	0	6	1	0	0	27	2
DF	(Brazil)	Claudiomiro	18	2	16 (1)	2	7	1	4	0	46	5
DF	(Argentina)	Galván	0	0	16	2	4	0	5	0	25	2
DF	(Brazil)	Léo	16	0	0	0	0	0	0	0	16	0
DF	(Brazil)	Márcio Santos	0	0	7 (1)	0	1 (3)	0	2	0	14	0
DF	(Brazil)	Michel	17 (1)	0	11 (2)	0	3 (1)	0	4 (2)	0	41	0
DF	(Brazil)	Preto	11 (6)	0	2 (2)	0	2 (1)	0	0	0	24	0
DF	(Brazil)	Rubens Cardoso	8 (2)	0	10 (4)	0	8 (1)	1	6	0	39	1
DF	(Brazil)	Sangaletti	11 (1)	0	0	0	0	0	0	0	12	0
MF	(Brazil)	Aílton	0 (3)	0	0 (1)	0	0	0	0 (2)	1	6	1
MF	(Brazil)	Anderson Luiz	17 (1)	2	10 (4)	1	6 (3)	0	3	0	44	3
MF	(Brazil)	Canindé	0 (3)	0	0	0	0 (2)	0	0	0	5	0
MF	(Brazil)	Eduardo Marques	3 (3)	0	5 (7)	3	1 (5)	0	2	0	26	3
MF	(Brazil)	Marcelo Silva	2	0	0	0	0	0	2	0	4	0
MF	(Brazil)	Paulo Almeida	0 (1)	0	0 (1)	0	0	0	0	0	2	0
MF	(Brazil)	Renato	16 (7)	0	0	0	0	0	0	0	23	0
MF	(Colombia)	Rincón	20	1	16	2	8	2	0	0	44	5
MF	(Brazil)	Robert	23	5	8 (11)	1	6 (2)	2	0 (1)	0	51	8
MF	(Brazil)	Valdo	15 (4)	1	15 (1)	1	8 (1)	2	0	0	44	4
MF	(Brazil)	Wellington	3	0	0	0	0	0	0	0	3	0
FW	(Brazil)	André Dias	0 (1)	0	0	0	0	0	0	0	1	0
FW	(Brazil)	Caio	3 (8)	0	16 (4)	4	8	2	6	2	45	8
FW	(Brazil)	Deivid	1 (1)	0	2 (11)	2	2 (2)	2	2 (2)	0	23	4
FW	(Brazil)	Dodô	24	10	11 (6)	8	7	6	6	3	54	27
FW	(Brazil)	Edmundo	20	13	0	0	0	0	0	0	20	13
FW	(Brazil)	Gaúcho	0 (1)	0	0	0	0	0	0	0	1	0
FW	(Brazil)	Júlio César	0 (19)	2	0	0	0 (2)	0	0	0	21	2
FW	(Brazil)	Weldon	0	0	0	0	0	0	1 (2)	0	3	0
Players who left the club during the season
DF	(Brazil)	Ânderson Lima	0	0	0	0	0	0	3	0	3	0
DF	(Brazil)	Baiano	0	0	18	1	8	1	1	0	27	2
DF	(Brazil)	Dutra	0	0	10 (1)	0	1	0	2	0	14	0
DF	(Brazil)	Jean	0	0	0	0	0	0	4 (2)	0	6	0
MF	(Brazil)	Caíco	0	0	0	0	0	0	1 (2)	0	3	0
MF	(Brazil)	Élder	0	0	0	0	0	0	1 (1)	0	2	0
MF	(Brazil)	Piá	0	0	0	0	0 (2)	0	0	0	2	0
FW	(Brazil)	Adiel	0	0	0	0	0	0	5 (1)	0	6	0
FW	(Brazil)	Rodrigão	0	0	0	0	0	0	0 (2)	0	2	0
FW	(Brazil)	Valdir Bigode	0	0	19	5	4	0	0	0	23	5

Source: Match reports in Competitive matches

==== Goalscorers ====
Ran	Pos	Nat	Name	João Havelange	Copa do Brasil	Paulistão	Rio-SP	Total
1	FW	(Brazil)	Dodô	10	6	8	3	27
2	FW	(Brazil)	Edmundo	13	0	0	0	13
3	FW	(Brazil)	Caio	0	2	4	2	8
3	MF	(Brazil)	Robert	5	2	1	0	8
4	MF	(Brazil)	Claudiomiro	2	1	2	0	5
4	MF	(Colombia)	Rincón	1	2	2	0	5
4	FW	(Brazil)	Valdir Bigode	0	0	5	0	5
5	FW	(Brazil)	Deivid	0	2	2	0	4
5	MF	(Brazil)	Valdo	1	2	1	0	4
6	MF	(Brazil)	Anderson Luiz	2	0	1	0	3
6	MF	(Brazil)	Eduardo Marques	0	0	3	0	3
7	DF	(Brazil)	André Luís	1	1	0	0	2
7	DF	(Brazil)	Baiano	0	1	1	0	2
7	DF	(Argentina)	Galván	0	0	2	0	2
7	FW	(Brazil)	Júlio César	2	0	0	0	2
8	MF	(Brazil)	Aílton	0	0	0	1	1
8	DF	(Brazil)	Rubens Cardoso	0	1	0	0	1

Source: Match reports in Competitive matches

== Transfers ==
=== In ===
Pos.	Name	Moving from	Source	Notes
LB	(Brazil) Rubens Cardoso	Guarani		
DF	(Argentina) Galván	Atlético Mineiro		
GK	(Brazil) Carlos Germano	Vasco da Gama		
FW	(Brazil) Caio	Flamengo		Loan return
RB	(Brazil) Ânderson Lima	São Paulo		Loan return
RB	(Brazil) Baiano	Vitória		Loan return
DM	(Brazil) Élder	Juventude		Loan return
LB	(Brazil) Dutra	Coritiba		Loan return
CB	(Brazil) Márcio Santos	São Paulo		
DM	(Brazil) Anderson Luiz	Internacional		On loan
ST	(Brazil) Weldon	Youth system		Promoted
CB	(Brazil) André Luís	Youth system		Promoted
CB	(Brazil) Pereira	Youth system		Promoted
GK	(Brazil) Mateus	Youth system		Promoted
MF	(Brazil) Robert	Grêmio		
MF	(Colombia) Rincón	Corinthians		
ST	(Brazil) Valdir	Atlético Mineiro		
GK	(Brazil) Fábio Costa	Vitória		
MF	(Brazil) Valdo	Cruzeiro		
FW	(Brazil) Júlio César	Matonense		
MF	(Brazil) Piá	Matonense		Loan return
CB	(Brazil) Preto	Juventus		
DM	(Brazil) Paulo Almeida	Youth system		Promoted
AM	(Brazil) Canindé	Youth system		Promoted
FW	(Brazil) Gauchinho	Youth system		Promoted
MF	(Brazil) Renato	Guarani		
GK	(Brazil) Pitarelli	Portuguesa Santista		
FW	(Brazil) Edmundo	Vasco da Gama		On loan
LB	(Brazil) Léo	União São João		
CB	(Brazil) Sangaletti	Sport		On loan
MF	(Brazil) Wellington	Youth system		Promoted
ST	(Brazil) André Dias	Youth system		Promoted

=== Out ===
Pos.	Name	Moving to	Source	Notes
GK	(Brazil) Fernando Leão	Free agent		
DF	(Brazil) Andrei	(Spain) Real Betis		Loan return
DF	(Brazil) Cláudio	(Japan) Bellmare Hiratsuka		Loan return
DF	(Brazil) Marcelo Heleno	Free agent		
MF	(Brazil) Élson	Free agent		
FW	(Brazil) Lúcio	Flamengo		Loan return
LB	(Brazil) Gustavo Nery	Guarani		On loan
MF	(Brazil) Fumagalli	Guarani		On loan
GK	(Brazil) Zetti	Fluminense		
LB	(Ecuador) Fricson George	(Ecuador) Barcelona		Loan return
DM	(Brazil) Marcos Bazílio	Portuguesa Santista		
DF	(Brazil) Valdir	Portuguesa Santista		
FW	(Brazil) / (Germany) Paulo Rink	(Germany) Bayer Leverkusen		Loan return
ST	(Brazil) Rodrigão	Internacional		On loan
RB	(Brazil) Ânderson Lima	Grêmio		
DM	(Brazil) Élder	Inter de Limeira		On loan
MF	(Brazil) Caíco	Atlético Mineiro		On loan
ST	(Brazil) Valdir	Atlético Mineiro		
DF	(Brazil) Jean	Bahia		On loan
AM	(Brazil) Piá	Ponte Preta		
LB	(Brazil) Gustavo Nery	Guarani		
RB	(Brazil) Ceará	Portuguesa Santista		
RB	(Brazil) Baiano	(Spain) Las Palmas		
LB	(Brazil) Dutra	Sport		On loan
FW	(Brazil) Adiel	(Japan) Urawa Red Diamonds		

== Friendlies ==
2 March Friendly	Santos	0 – 0	Atlético Paranaense	Santos
		Report		Stadium: Vila Belmiro; Attendance: 4,808; Referee: Otávio Correa da Silva and Roberto Ferreira Pinto

30 July Friendly	São Bento	0 – 0	Santos	Sorocaba
		Report		Stadium: Estádio Walter Ribeiro; Referee: Silvio César Talarico

5 September Friendly	Real Madrid (Spain)	2 – 0	Santos	Madrid
	Sávio 83'; Munitis 87'	Report		Stadium: Estadio Santiago Bernabéu; Referee: García Aranda

== Competitions ==
=== Overall summary ===
Competition	Started round	Final position / round	First match	Last match
Copa João Havelange	—	18th	2 August	19 November
Campeonato Paulista	Second stage	Runners-up	8 March	18 June
Copa do Brasil	Second round	Semi-finals	5 April	2 July
Torneio Rio-São Paulo	Group stage	Group stage	22 January	12 February

Source: Competitions

=== Copa João Havelange ===
==== Results summary ====
Overall								Home						Away					
Pld	W	D	L	GF	GA	GD	Pts	W	D	L	GF	GA	GD	W	D	L	GF	GA	GD
24	9	6	9	38	31	+7	33	6	4	2	24	13	+11	3	2	7	14	18	−4

Source: Acervo Santista

==== First stage ====
===== Group Blue =====
Pos	Team	Pld	W	D	L	GF	GA	GD	Pts
12	Bahia (A)	24	10	6	8	29	30	−1	36
13	Guarani	24	9	8	7	29	29	0	35
14	Santos	24	9	6	9	38	31	+7	33
15	Flamengo	24	9	6	9	42	37	+5	33
16	Botafogo	24	9	5	10	31	35	−4	32

Updated to match(es) played on 4 June 2009. Source: RSSSF
Rules for classification: 1) points; 2) goal difference; 3) number of goals scored.
(A) Advance to a further round

===== Matches =====
2 August 1	Santos	2 – 0	Vitória	Santos
20:30	Dodô 42'; Júlio César 72'	Report		Stadium: Vila Belmiro; Attendance: 4,148; Referee: Léo Feldman

5 August 2	Fluminense	2 – 1	Santos	Rio de Janeiro
20:30	César 85', 89'	Report	19' Dodô	Stadium: Estádio do Maracanã; Attendance: 16,299; Referee: Carlos Eugênio Simon

9 August 3	Santos	1 – 1	São Paulo	Santos
20:30	Dodô 28'	Report	51' Fábio Simplício	Stadium: Vila Belmiro; Attendance: 17,011; Referee: Alfredo Loebeling

12 August 4	Grêmio	0 – 2	Santos	Porto Alegre
18:00		Report	61' Edmundo; 68' Anderson Luiz	Stadium: Estádio Olímpico Monumental; Attendance: 6,856; Referee: Reinaldo Ribas

16 August 5	Santos	3 – 0	América Mineiro	Santos
20:30	Edmundo 51'; Robert 71', 78'	Report		Stadium: Vila Belmiro; Attendance: 2,762; Referee: Heber Roberto Lopes

19 August 6	Atlético Mineiro	1 – 0	Santos	Belo Horizonte
15:45	Caíco 51'	Report		Stadium: Mineirão; Attendance: 7,173; Referee: Carlos Eugênio Simon

23 August 7	Juventude	1 – 1	Santos	Caxias do Sul
20:30	Michel 47'	Report	86' Júlio César	Stadium: Estádio Alfredo Jaconi; Attendance: 3,618; Referee: Léo Feldman

27 August 8	Santos	2 – 3	Palmeiras	Santos
18:30	Edmundo 11' (pen.), 71' (pen.)	Report	7' Adriano; 12' (pen.) Arce; 38' Basílio	Stadium: Vila Belmiro; Attendance: 7,315; Referee: Paulo César de Oliveira

30 August 9	Corinthians	0 – 3	Santos	São Paulo
20:30		Report	6', 38' Edmundo; 25' Dodô	Stadium: Estádio do Morumbi; Attendance: 4,591; Referee: Alfredo Loebeling

2 September 10	Santos	1 – 1	Cruzeiro	Santos
15:45	Edmundo 74'	Report	34' Jackson	Stadium: Vila Belmiro; Attendance: 2,382; Referee: Antonio Pereira da Silva

9 September 11	Santa Cruz	0 – 1	Santos	Recife
16:00		Report	52' Dodô	Stadium: Estádio do Arruda; Attendance: 17,279; Referee: Wagner Tardelli

16 September 12	Internacional	1 – 1	Santos	Porto Alegre
15:45	Denis 48'	Report	11' Edmundo	Stadium: Estádio Beira-Rio; Attendance: 13,686; Referee: Luciano Augusto de Almeida

20 September 13	Santos	2 – 1	Atlético Paranaense	Santos
20:30	Edmundo 15' (pen.); Robert 66'	Report	73' Cocito	Stadium: Vila Belmiro; Attendance: 3,246; Referee: Fabiano Gonçalves

23 September 14	Flamengo	3 – 0	Santos	Rio de Janeiro
16:00	Adriano 57'; Petković 73' (pen.); Fernando 83'	Report		Stadium: Estádio do Maracanã; Attendance: 20,126; Referee: Oscar Roberto de Godoi

4 October 15	Gama	2 – 1	Santos	Brasília
20:30	Silva 20'; Marcos Piauí 67'	Report	31' (pen.) Dodô	Stadium: Estádio Mané Garrincha; Attendance: 3,490; Referee: Léo Feldman

7 October 16	Santos	3 – 3	Ponte Preta	Santos
16:00	Valdo 21'; Edmundo 65' (pen.); Ronaldão 69' (o.g.)	Report	52' (pen.) Piá; 82', 90+2' Marco Aurélio	Stadium: Vila Belmiro; Attendance: 3,743; Referee: Alfredo Loebeling

14 October 17	Santos	1 – 1	Vasco da Gama	Santos
15:45	Robert 90+2'	Report	42' Juninho Paulista	Stadium: Vila Belmiro; Attendance: 16,872; Referee: Wilson de Souza Mendonça

21 October 18	Goiás	3 – 1	Santos	Goiânia
15:45	Dill 32'; Evair 46'; Araújo 53'	Report	75' André Luís	Stadium: Estádio Serra Dourada; Attendance: 17,643; Referee: Wagner Tardelli

28 October 19	Santos	0 – 1	Bahia	Santos
18:00		Report	83' (pen.) Jorge Wagner	Stadium: Vila Belmiro; Attendance: 5,493; Referee: Leonardo Gaciba

5 November 20	Coritiba	2 – 1	Santos	Curitiba
17:00	Da Silva 4', 89'	Report	26' (pen.) Dodô	Stadium: Estádio Couto Pereira; Attendance: 2,332; Referee: Reinaldo Ribas

8 November 21	Santos	2 – 0	Portuguesa	Santos
21:40	Claudiomiro 3'; Dodô 66'	Report		Stadium: Vila Belmiro; Attendance: 3,793; Referee: Alfredo Loebeling

11 November 22	Santos	3 – 1	Sport	Santos
16:00	Edmundo 11', 75'; Rincón 63'	Report	70' Ricardinho	Stadium: Vila Belmiro; Attendance: 5,629; Referee: Carlos Eugênio Simon

16 November 23	Guarani	3 – 2	Santos	Campinas
21:40	Marcinho 31', 58'; Renato Abreu 76'	Report	34' Dodô; 70' Robert	Stadium: Estádio Brinco de Ouro da Princesa; Attendance: 11,999; Referee: Paulo César de Oliveira

19 November 24	Santos	4 – 1	Botafogo	Santos
16:00	Dodô 16'; Claudiomiro 44'; Anderson Luiz 74'; Edmundo 88'	Report	37' Donizete	Stadium: Vila Belmiro; Attendance: 1,221; Referee: Oscar Roberto de Godoi

=== Copa do Brasil ===
==== Second round ====
5 April 1st Leg	Serra	0 – 3	Santos	Cariacica
19:00		Report	16' Dodô; 75', 87' Deivid	Stadium: Estádio Engenheiro Alencar Araripe; Referee: Willian Marcelo Macedo de Souza Neri Proença

==== Third round ====
27 April 1st Leg	Coritiba	0 – 1	Santos	Curitiba
21:00		Report	89' Valdo	Stadium: Estádio Couto Pereira; Referee: Carlos Eugênio Simon

3 May 2nd Leg	Santos	1 – 1 (2 – 1 agg.)	Coritiba	Santos
21:40	Claudiomiro 29'	Report	70' Lipatín	Stadium: Vila Belmiro; Attendance: 5,672; Referee: Luciano Augusto de Almeida

==== Round of 16 ====
24 May 1st Leg	Juventude	1 – 3	Santos	Caxias do Sul
20:00	Mabilia 11'	Report	61', 90+2' Robert; 69' (pen.) Rincón	Stadium: Estádio Alfredo Jaconi; Attendance: 6,810; Referee: Carlos Magno

31 May 2nd Leg	Santos	3 – 0 (6 – 1 agg.)	Juventude	Santos
21:40	Rubens Cardoso 33'; Valdo 74'; Baiano 84'	Report		Stadium: Vila Belmiro; Attendance: 4,621; Referee: Jamir Carlos Garcez

==== Quarter-finals ====
21 June 1st Leg	Flamengo	0 – 4	Santos	Rio de Janeiro
20:30		Report	28', 31' Dodô; 54', 67' Caio	Stadium: Maracanã; Referee: Oscar Roberto de Godoi

24 June 2nd Leg	Santos	4 – 2 (8 – 2 agg.)	Flamengo	Santos
16:00	André Luís 32'; Dodô 61', 80', 90+1'	Report	43' Petković; 84' Mozart	Stadium: Vila Belmiro; Referee: Wilson de Souza Mendonça

==== Semi-finals ====
29 June 1st leg	Cruzeiro	2 – 0	Santos	Belo Horizonte
21:40	Geovanni 23' (pen.); Donizete Oliveira 89'	Report		Stadium: Mineirão; Attendance: 13,321; Referee: Antônio Pereira da Silva

2 July 2nd leg	Santos	2 – 2 (2 – 4 agg.)	Cruzeiro	Santos
18:30	Rincón 38' (pen.); André Luís 77'	Report	16' Ricardinho; 49' Oséas	Stadium: Vila Belmiro; Attendance: 13,253; Referee: Carlos Eugênio Simon

=== Campeonato Paulista ===
==== Second stage ====
===== League table =====
Group 6
Pos	Team	Pld	W	D	L	GF	GA	GD	Pts
1	Portuguesa	10	4	5	1	18	13	+5	17
2	Santos	10	4	4	2	19	15	+4	16
3	Inter de Limeira	10	3	2	5	13	15	−2	11
4	Mogi Mirim	10	3	0	7	10	20	−10	9

Updated to match(es) played on 23 April 2000. Source: Universo Online

===== Matches =====
8 March 1	Matonense	2 – 2	Santos	Matão
20:30	Gilson Batata 49'; Gérson 74'	Report	38' Dodô; 39' Deivid	Stadium: Estádio Hudson Buck Ferreira; Referee: Paulo César de Oliveira and Cássio Galzerano Fenga

12 March 2	Santos	1 – 0	Ponte Preta	Santos
20:30	Caio 8'	Report		Stadium: Vila Belmiro; Attendance: 22,806; Referee: Romildo Correia and Marcelo Cansian

19 March 3	Corinthians	5 – 1	Santos	São Paulo
17:00	Edílson 9'; Vampeta 68'; Marcelinho Carioca 74', 76'; Ricardinho 90+2'	Report	90+3' Claudiomiro	Stadium: Estádio do Morumbi; Referee: Alfredo Loebeling and Sálvio Spínola

22 March 4	Santos	7 – 2	Araçatuba	Santos
20:30	Galván 1', 10'; Dodô 4' (pen.), 13' (pen.); Valdir Bigode 44', 59', 73'	Report	43' Gilson; 45+2' Núbio	Stadium: Vila Belmiro; Attendance: 13,782; Referee: Anselmo da Costa and Luiz Edmar Caldeira

25 March 5	Inter de Limeira	1 – 2	Santos	Limeira
16:00	Edmundo 6'	Report	45+1' Valdir Bigode; 90+1' Caio	Stadium: Estádio Major José Levy Sobrinho; Referee: Ilson Honorato do Santos and Tadeu Bosco da Cruz

2 April 6	Santos	1 – 1	Portuguesa	Santos
16:00	Simão 90+5' (o.g.)	Report	10' Leandro Amaral	Stadium: Vila Belmiro; Referee: Paulo César de Oliveira and Marcelo Cansian

9 April 7	Mogi Mirim	1 – 0	Santos	Mogi Mirim
16:00	Alexandre 24	Report		Stadium: Estádio Wilson Fernandes de Barros; Referee: Edson Borborema and Alfredo Loebeling

13 April 8	Santos	3 – 1	Mogi Mirim	Santos
20:30	Caio 13'; Dodô 39', 62'	Report	76' Sandro Gaúcho	Stadium: Vila Belmiro; Referee: Luciano Quilichini and Wilson Seneme

15 April 9	Portuguesa	1 – 1	Santos	São Paulo
16:00	Leandro Amaral 39'	Report	61' Dodô	Stadium: Estádio do Canindé; Referee: Sálvio Spínola and Paulo José Danelon

23 April 10	Santos	1 – 1	Inter de Limeira	Santos
16:00	Deivid 51'	Report	90+2' Everaldo	Stadium: Vila Belmiro; Referee: Wilson Seneme and Ilson Honorato do Santos

==== Third stage ====
===== League table =====
Group 7
Pos	Team	Pld	W	D	L	GF	GA	GD	Pts
1	Santos	6	4	1	1	9	5	+4	13
2	São Paulo	6	3	2	1	13	7	+6	11
3	Portuguesa	6	2	1	3	10	11	−1	7
4	Guarani	6	1	0	5	5	14	−9	3

Updated to match(es) played on 20 May 2000. Source: Universo Online

===== Matches =====
30 April 1	Santos	2 – 1	Guarani	Santos
16:00	Valdo 6'; Rincón 45+1'	Report	84' Renato	Stadium: Vila Belmiro; Attendance: 6,326; Referee: Paulo César de Oliveira and Cleber Abade

6 May 2	Portuguesa	2 – 0	Santos	São Paulo
16:00	Leandro Amaral 45' (pen.), 86'	Report		Stadium: Estádio do Canindé; Referee: Alfredo Loebeling and Silvio Talarico

10 May 3	São Paulo	1 – 2	Santos	São Paulo
21:30	França 44'	Report	31' Eduardo Marques; 88' Robert	Stadium: Estádio do Morumbi; Attendance: 24,762; Referee: Paulo César de Oliveira and Ilson Honorato

13 May 4	Santos	1 – 1	São Paulo	Santos
16:00	Eduardo Marques 6'	Report	20' Edu	Stadium: Vila Belmiro; Attendance: 9,004; Referee: Sálvio Spínola and Vladimir Vassoler

17 May 5	Guarani	0 – 1	Santos	Campinas
20:30		Report	26' Claudiomiro	Stadium: Estádio Brinco de Ouro da Princesa; Referee: Romildo Correia and Robério Pereira Pires

20 May 6	Santos	3 – 0	Portuguesa	Santos
16:00	Caio 10'; Baiano 56'; Valdir Bigode 58'	Report		Stadium: Vila Belmiro; Attendance: 6,894; Referee: Paulo César de Oliveira and Edílson Pereira de Carvalho

==== Knockout stage ====
===== Semi-finals =====
27 May First leg	Santos	0 – 0	Palmeiras	São Paulo
16:00		Report		Stadium: Estádio do Morumbi; Attendance: 7,000; Referee: Romildo Correia and Sálvio Spínola

4 June Second leg	Palmeiras	2 – 3 (2 – 3 agg.)	Santos	São Paulo
11:00	Argel 32'; Euller 53'	Report	69' Eduardo Marques; 78' Anderson Luiz; 90' Dodô	Stadium: Estádio do Morumbi; Referee: Paulo César de Oliveira and Ilson Honorato dos Santos

===== Final =====
10 June First leg	Santos	0 – 1	São Paulo	São Paulo
16:00		Report	1' França	Stadium: Estádio do Morumbi; Attendance: 57,101; Referee: Paulo César de Oliveira and Sálvio Spínola

18 June Second leg	São Paulo	2 – 2 (3 – 2 agg.)	Santos	São Paulo
16:00	Rogério Ceni 39'; Marcelinho Paraíba 68'	Report	29' Dodô; 54' (pen.) Rincón	Stadium: Estádio do Morumbi; Attendance: 74,916; Referee: Alfredo Loebeling and Ilson Honorato dos Santos

=== Torneiro Rio-São Paulo ===
==== Group stage ====
Group B
Pos	Team	Pld	W	D	L	GF	GA	GD	Pts
1	São Paulo	6	4	0	2	13	12	+1	12
2	Botafogo	6	3	1	2	11	8	+3	10
3	Flamengo	6	2	2	2	14	10	+4	8
4	Santos	6	1	1	4	6	14	−8	4

Updated to match(es) played on 12 February 2000. Source: Bola na Área

===== Matches =====
22 January 1	Santos	0 – 3	Botafogo	Santos
16:00		Report	29', 71' Rodrigo; 37' Zé Carlos	Stadium: Vila Belmiro; Attendance: 13,064; Referee: Jorge Travassos

26 January 2	São Paulo	5 – 2	Santos	São Paulo
20:30	França 20', 22', 47'; Evair 45', 62'	Report	34' Dodô; 90+2' Caio	Stadium: Estádio do Morumbi; Attendance: 3,070; Referee: Léo Feldman

29 January 3	Santos	1 – 1	Flamengo	Santos
16:00	Aílton 70'	Report	32' Fábio Baiano	Stadium: Vila Belmiro; Attendance: 6,657; Referee: Cláudio Vinícius Cerdeira

2 February 4	Santos	0 – 1	São Paulo	Santos
20:30		Report	80' Carlos Miguel	Stadium: Vila Belmiro; Attendance: 9,213; Referee: Samir Yarak

6 February 5	Botafogo	0 – 2	Santos	Rio de Janeiro
19:00		Report	39' Dodô; 68' Caio	Stadium: Maracanã; Attendance: 7,140; Referee: Sérgio Corrêa da Silva

12 February 6	Flamengo	4 – 1	Santos	Rio de Janeiro
16:00	Petković 29'; Juan 35'; Lúcio 62'; Leandro Machado 66'	Report	55' Dodô	Stadium: Maracanã; Referee: Romildo Correia
