= 2002–03 Süper Lig =

45th season of top-tier Turkish football

Süper Lig
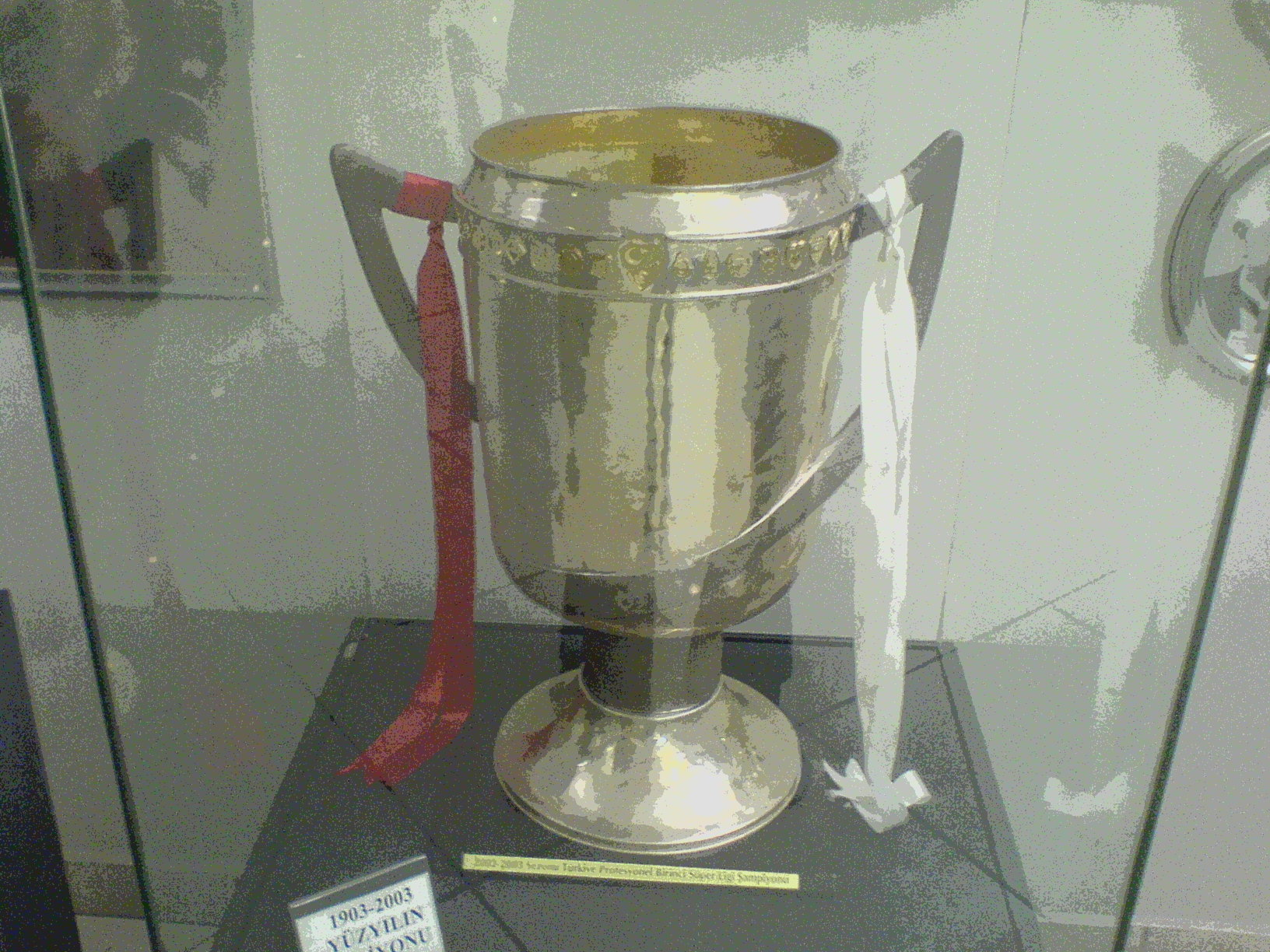
- The 2002–03 Süper Lig champions' trophy.
- Season: 2002–03
- Champions: Beşiktaş; 12th title
- Relegated: Altay; Göztepe; Kocaelispor
- Champions League: Beşiktaş; Galatasaray
- UEFA Cup: Trabzonspor; Gençlerbirliği; Gaziantepspor; Malatyaspor
- Matches: 306
- Goals: 853 (2.79 per match)
- Top goalscorer: Okan Yılmaz (24 goals)

The 2002-03 Süper Lig was the 45th edition of top-flight professional football in Turkey. The season celebrated the centenary of Beşiktaş J.K., who became champions. Moreover, Malatyaspor qualified for the first time in a European cup competition after a 2–0 away win at Turkish Cup winners Trabzonspor combined with Fenerbahçe's draw at İzmir with relegated Göztepe, 1–1, despite being ahead in the first half. They are the first team from Eastern Anatolia to play in UEFA competitions.

== Locations ==
Location of teams in Süper Lig 2002–03

== Foreign players ==
Club	Player 1	Player 2	Player 3	Player 4	Player 5	Player 6	Player 7	Player 8	Former Players
Adanaspor	(Brazil) Pachola	(Bulgaria) Rosen Emilov	(Bulgaria) Svetlin Simeonov	(Ghana) Ohene Kennedy	(Slovakia) Marián Ľalík	(Slovakia) Milan Timko			
Altay	(Cameroon) Buba Yohanna	(Cameroon) Ghislain Chameni	(Cameroon) Jean-Emmanuel Effa Owona						
Beşiktaş	(Brazil) Ronaldo Guiaro	(Brazil) Zago	(Colombia) Óscar Córdoba	(France) Pascal Nouma	(Italy) Federico Giunti	(Romania) Daniel Pancu	(Romania) Marius Măldărășanu		(Brazil) Amaral
Bursaspor	(Bosnia and Herzegovina) Mirza Varešanović	(Brazil) Glauber	(Brazil) Júnior	(Croatia) Antonio Franja	(Croatia) Josip Bulat	(Poland) Radosław Majdan	(Slovakia) Marián Kelemen		
Denizlispor	(Brazil) Rafael	(Finland) Janne Hietanen	(Germany) Dirk Heinen	(Hungary) Péter Kabát	(Slovakia) Henrich Benčík	(Slovakia) Roman Kratochvíl	(Sweden) Jones Kusi-Asare		
Diyarbakırspor	(Albania) Altin Rraklli	(Brazil) Dida	(Brazil) Gerino Moura	(Guinea) Saliou Diallo					
Elazığspor	(Brazil) Marcio Jarro	(Brazil) Robson Carioca	(Brazil) Zé Roberto	(Nigeria) Mohammed Lawal	(Slovakia) Juraj Czinege	(Slovakia) Ľubomír Meszároš			
Fenerbahçe	(Argentina) Ariel Ortega	(Brazil) Washington	(Croatia) Milan Rapaić	(Ghana) Samuel Johnson	(Federal Republic of Yugoslavia) Miroslav Stević	(Federal Republic of Yugoslavia) Zoran Mirković	(Russia) Vladimir Beschastnykh	(Ukraine) Serhiy Rebrov	(Israel) Haim Revivo
Galatasaray	(Bosnia and Herzegovina) Elvir Baljić	(Brazil) Fábio Pinto	(Brazil) João Batista	(Colombia) Faryd Mondragón	(Democratic Republic of the Congo) Ali Lukunku	(Israel) Haim Revivo	(Mexico) Sergio Almaguer	(Portugal) Abel Xavier	(Brazil) Christian (Brazil) Felipe (Senegal) Mohamed Sarr
Gaziantepspor	(Brazil) Júlio César	(Brazil) Régis Pitbull	(Brazil) Viola	(Belarus) Maksim Romaschenko	(Colombia) Gustavo Victoria	(Ghana) Yaw Preko	(Tunisia) Riadh Bouazizi		
Gençlerbirliği	(Belgium) Filip Daems	(Democratic Republic of the Congo) Marcel Mbayo	(Egypt) Abdel-Zaher El-Saqqa	(Egypt) Ahmed Hassan	(Guinea) Souleymane Youla	(Poland) Tomasz Zdebel	(Slovenia) Damir Botonjič		
Göztepe	(Algeria) Rachid Djebaili	(South Africa) Helman Mkhalele							(Democratic Republic of the Congo) N'Dayi Kalenga (Liberia) Joseph Amoah (Morocco) Kamel Ouejdide
İstanbulspor	(Albania) Alban Bushi	(Brazil) André Paulo Pinto	(Bulgaria) Aleksandar Aleksandrov	(Bulgaria) Ivaylo Petkov	(Bulgaria) Zdravko Zdravkov	(Cameroon) Alioum Boukar	(Cameroon) Alioum Saidou	(Nigeria) Uche Okechukwu	(Democratic Republic of the Congo) Andre Kona
Kocaelispor	(Australia) Con Blatsis	(Bulgaria) Stanimir Georgiev	(Bulgaria) Zdravko Lazarov	(Federal Republic of Yugoslavia) Milorad Korać	(Georgia (country)) Givi Didava	(Georgia (country)) Grigol Imedadze	(Georgia (country)) Revaz Kemoklidze	(Georgia (country)) Zaza Janashia	(Albania) Viktor Paço (Brazil) Capone (Bulgaria) Aleksandar Aleksandrov
Malatyaspor	(Albania) Klodian Duro	(Angola) Johnson Macaba	(Bulgaria) Martin Stankov	(Egypt) Ayman Abdel-Aziz	(Kosovo) Arsim Abazi	(North Macedonia) Petar Miloševski			(Brazil) Paulo Isidoro
MKE Ankaragücü	(Brazil) Rogério Belém	(Brazil) Simão	(Ghana) Augustine Ahinful	(Ghana) Stephen Baidoo	(Romania) Radu Niculescu				(Romania) Stelian Carabaș
Samsunspor	(Brazil) Juninho Cearense	(Brazil) Milton do Ó	(Brazil) Sandro Sousa	(Nigeria) Ike Shorunmu	(Nigeria) Mutiu Adepoju	(North Macedonia) Stojan Ignatov	(North Macedonia) Zoran Jovanovski		(Albania) Bekim Kuli (Brazil) Sandro Yokota
Trabzonspor	(Australia) Michael Petkovic	(Belgium) Hans Somers	(Brazil) Marco Aurélio	(France) Oumar Dieng	(South Korea) Lee Eul-yong				(Albania) Alban Bushi

== Final league table ==
Pos	Team	Pld	W	D	L	GF	GA	GD	Pts	Qualification or relegation
1	Beşiktaş (C)	34	26	7	1	63	21	+42	85	Qualification to Champions League group stage
2	Galatasaray	34	24	5	5	61	27	+34	77	Qualification to Champions League third qualifying round
3	Gençlerbirliği	34	19	9	6	76	40	+36	66	Qualification to UEFA Cup first round
4	Gaziantepspor	34	16	9	9	61	41	+20	57	Qualification to UEFA Cup first round
5	Malatyaspor	34	14	10	10	56	45	+11	52	Qualification to UEFA Cup first round
6	Fenerbahçe	34	13	12	9	55	42	+13	51 (Note: Fenerbahçe were ahead of Trabzonspor on head-to-head record: Fenerbahçe–Trabzonspor 3–2, Trabzonspor–Fenerbahçe 0–0.)	
7	Trabzonspor	34	13	12	9	44	33	+11	51	Qualification to UEFA Cup first round (Note: Trabzonspor have won the 2002–03 Turkish Cup competition and thus are qualified for the first round of the UEFA Cup.)
8	MKE Ankaragücü	34	15	4	15	44	42	+2	49	
9	İstanbulspor	34	12	7	15	42	48	−6	43	
10	Denizlispor	34	10	10	14	37	42	−5	40 (Note: Denizlispor were ahead of Adanaspor on head-to-head goal difference: Denizlispor–Adanaspor 2–0, Adanaspor–Denizlispor 2–1.)	
11	Adanaspor	34	10	10	14	44	54	−10	40	
12	Samsunspor	34	10	9	15	42	59	−17	39	
13	Elazığspor	34	10	7	17	40	59	−19	37	
14	Diyarbakırspor	34	9	9	16	34	47	−13	36 (Note: Diyarbakırspor were ahead of Bursaspor on head-to-head goal difference: Bursaspor–Diyarbakırspor 4–1, Diyarbakırspor–Bursaspor 4–0.)	
15	Bursaspor	34	9	9	16	42	62	−20	36	
16	Altay (R)	34	9	8	17	48	69	−21	35	Relegation to Turkish Second League Category A
17	Göztepe A.Ş. (R)	34	5	11	18	32	57	−25	26	Relegation to Turkish Second League Category A
18	Kocaelispor (R)	34	6	4	24	32	66	−34	22	Relegation to Turkish Second League Category A

Rules for classification: 1) points; 2) goal difference; 3) number of goals scored.
(C) Champions; (R) Relegated

== Results ==
Home \ Away	ADA	ALT	BJK	BUR	DEN	DYB	ELA	FNB	GAL	GAZ	GEN	GÖZ	İST	KOC	MAL	AGÜ	SAM	TRA
Adanaspor		5–2	0–1	2–2	2–1	2–1	0–0	3–1	0–0	0–2	2–7	1–2	0–3	1–0	1–1	0–2	1–1	0–1
Altay	0–4		0–1	2–1	3–1	2–2	5–1	1–3	1–2	0–0	3–3	4–2	4–3	5–0	0–2	2–3	2–2	1–4
Beşiktaş	3–0	2–0		1–0	2–0	2–0	3–1	2–0	1–0	0–0	1–1	7–3	2–1	2–1	3–0	1–0	2–0	0–0
Bursaspor	3–0	2–1	2–2		2–0	4–1	1–1	2–1	0–4	1–1	3–1	1–0	1–2	4–2	1–1	0–2	2–1	1–2
Denizlispor	2–0	1–1	1–2	2–2		2–0	3–1	1–1	1–3	1–0	1–3	0–0	2–1	1–2	1–0	2–1	0–1	1–1
Diyarbakırspor	2–0	1–1	1–0	4–0	0–0		1–2	3–0	1–3	0–1	1–4	1–0	1–1	1–1	1–1	3–0	1–1	2–0
Elazığspor	4–2	2–0	0–1	2–1	0–2	0–1		3–3	0–0	1–3	0–3	0–0	1–0	0–1	2–1	1–0	3–1	2–0
Fenerbahçe	1–1	0–1	0–1	7–1	3–2	0–0	4–2		6–0	2–0	3–3	0–0	2–0	1–0	2–0	1–0	1–1	3–2
Galatasaray	2–2	5–0	0–1	2–0	0–1	1–0	3–0	2–0		2–1	1–1	3–1	2–0	2–0	2–1	3–0	4–1	2–1
Gaziantepspor	1–1	2–1	1–1	2–1	1–1	2–0	4–0	3–3	1–2		2–0	3–1	4–3	2–1	3–0	4–2	4–2	0–0
Gençlerbirliği	0–2	1–0	1–2	2–0	0–0	3–1	2–0	1–1	1–0	2–1		3–1	4–1	5–1	3–0	0–1	1–1	2–1
Göztepe	1–4	0–2	2–2	1–1	2–3	3–0	2–1	1–1	0–1	2–1	0–0		1–1	1–2	0–3	0–1	0–0	1–2
İstanbulspor	2–2	0–0	1–2	1–1	2–1	1–0	2–1	2–0	1–2	1–3	1–3	3–1		2–1	0–0	1–0	0–1	1–2
Kocaelispor	1–2	3–0	0–5	0–0	2–1	1–1	1–3	1–2	0–1	0–3	1–3	1–3	0–1		2–3	3–0	1–2	2–2
Malatyaspor	1–0	6–0	1–2	4–2	2–1	0–1	1–1	2–0	2–2	1–1	5–4	4–1	1–2	2–1		3–1	2–1	2–2
MKE Ankaragücü	1–1	3–0	0–1	4–0	1–1	3–1	3–1	0–0	1–2	5–3	0–1	1–0	1–0	2–0	1–1		3–2	2–0
Samsunspor	0–2	2–4	3–4	1–0	0–0	3–1	4–3	1–3	0–1	2–1	2–7	0–0	1–2	1–0	1–1	1–0		1–3
Trabzonspor	3–1	0–0	1–1	3–0	1–0	3–0	1–1	0–0	1–2	2–1	1–1	0–0	0–0	2–0	0–2	3–0	0–1	

Source: TFF, Mackolik
Legend: Blue = home team win; Yellow = draw; Red = away team win.

== Top scorers ==
Rank	Player	Club	Goals
1	(Turkey) Okan Yılmaz	Bursaspor	24
2	(Turkey) Necati Ateş	Adanaspor	19
3	(Ghana) Augustine Ahinful	Ankaragücü	16
3	(Turkey) Ümit Karan	Galatasaray	16
5	(Brazil) Viola	Gaziantepspor	14
5	(Turkey) Fatih Tekke	Trabzonspor / Gaziantepspor	14
7	(Egypt) Ahmed Hassan	Gençlerbirliği	13
7	(Turkey) Cenk Işler	Istanbulspor	13
7	(Turkey) Serkan Aykut	Samsunspor	13
10	(Turkey) Fazlı Ulusoy	Malatyaspor	12
