= Marcelo Silva =

Marcelo Silva may refer to:

- Marcelo Silva (footballer, born 1976), Brazilian football defensive midfielder
- Marcelo Silva (footballer, born 1989), Uruguayan football centre-back

== See also ==
- Marcelinho (footballer, born September 1984) (born 1973), born Marcelo Oliveira Silva, Brazilian football striker
