= Juninho Cearense =

Brazilian footballer

Personal information
- Full name: Regilson Saboya Monteiro Júnior
- Date of birth: 17 December 1980 (age 45)
- Place of birth: Fortaleza, Brazil
- Position: Midfielder

Senior career*
Years	Team	Apps	(Gls)
2002	ASA		
2002	Botafogo (PB)		
2003	Samsunspor		
2004	Atlético Mineiro		
2004	Fortaleza		
2005–2006	CRB		
2005	→ Marília (loan)		
2005	→ Coruripe (loan)		
2006	→ Santo André (loan)		
2006	Ceará		
2006	Bahia		
2007	Vila Nova		
2008	Fortaleza		
2008	CRB		
2008	ASA		
2009	Confiança		
2010	Uberlândia		
2011	Uberaba		
2011	Salgueiro		
2012	Guarany de Sobral		
2012–2013	Atlético de Alagoinhas		
2014	Manaus		
2015	Caiçara		
2015	Ferroviário		
2016–	Sete de Dourados		
- * Club domestic league appearances and goals

Regilson Saboya Monteiro Jr. known as Juninho Cearense (born 17 December 1980) is a Brazilian former professional footballer who played as a midfielder. He had journeyman career, playing for clubs from 10 difference states of Brazil, or 10 of 16 states of North East, South East and Central–West region. (Note: There are 26 states and one federal district, which Juninho had played for seven of nine states of NE (except Maranhão & Piaui), two of four of SE (except Espírito Santo & Rio), plus Goiás which is from Central–West; he never went to North nor South region of Brazil.)

== Career ==
Born in Fortaleza, Ceará as Regilson Saboya Monteiro Jr., he chose Juninho as his artist name, a diminutive form of Júnior. While he is from Ceará state of Brazil, to distinguish with other Juninho, he is also known as Juninho Cearense.

=== Turkey ===
In January 2003 Juninho Cearense signed for Turkish club Samsunspor of Samsun city in 1 1/2-year contract (along with fellow Brazilian Milton do Ó). Juninho forced to give up the foreigner quota to Júlio César Antônio de Souza in January 2004.

=== Atlético Mineiro ===
Juninho returned to Brazil in 2004 but in July returned to hometown club Fortaleza Esporte Clube. That season played alongside another Juninho in Mineiro – Junio César Arcanjo.

=== Journeyman in coastal Brazil ===
In January 2005 Juninho Cearense signed for Clube de Regatas Brasil in two-year contract, but immediately left for Marília Atlético Clube in temporary deal. In September 2005 he left for fellow Alagoas club Associação Atlética Coruripe in another temporary deal. In next season, he left for Esporte Clube Santo André. In March 2006 he returned to CRB again but in May 2006 left for Ceará Sporting Club, city rival of Fortaleza. Released in August, Juninho joined Esporte Clube Bahia in September.

=== Vila Nova of Goiás ===
In 2007, Juninho Cearense signed for Vila Nova Futebol Clube of Goiás state, which he extended the contract in May to last until 30 November 2007. That season he played alongside another Juninho – Júnior César Moreira da Cunha. The club promoted as the third in 2007 Campeonato Brasileiro Série C.

=== NE return ===
In January 2008 Juninho Cearense signed for Fortaleza again. In August 2008 he returned to CRB in short-term deal. However, in September he left for Agremiação Sportiva Arapiraquense. In January 2009 he signed for Associação Desportiva Confiança, located in Aracaju, capital of Sergipe state. He was released in September.

=== Minas Gerais ===
In January 2010 Juninho Cearense left for Uberlândia Esporte Clube of Minas Gerais state. However, he only played for the club in 2010 Minas Gerais Cup, finished as the runner-up. In the next season he moved to Uberaba Sport Club from nearby city, also the winner of the state cup. He played for the club in 2011 Campeonato Mineiro (round 1 to 11 except 5,7,9, 11)

=== Late career in NE ===
In April 2011 he left for Salgueiro Atlético Clube of Pernambuco state. He was released in August and replaced by another Juninho – Renato Agostinho de Oliveira Júnior.

In December 2011 Juninho signed a one-year contract with Guarany Sporting Club, from Sobral, Ceará state. In March 2012 he left for Alagoinhas Atlético Clube for Campeonato Baiano.

In December 2012 he signed for Alecrim Futebol Clube.

== Career statistics ==
Appearances and goals by club, season and competition
Club	Season	League			Cup (Note: Includes Copa do Brasil, Turkish Cup.)		State League		Other		Total	
Club	Season	Division	Apps	Goals	Apps	Goals	Apps	Goals	Apps	Goals	Apps	Goals
ASA	2002	Regional (AL)	–		4	1			–			
Botafogo (PB)	2002	Série C			–				–			
Samsunspor	2002–03	Süper Lig	13	4	–		–		–		13	4
Samsunspor	2003–04	Süper Lig	15	0	1	1	–		–		16	1
Samsunspor	Total		28	4	1	1	–		0	0	29	5
Atlético (MG)	2004	Série A	1+	0	0	0			–			
Fortaleza	2004	Série B			–		–		–			
Marília	2005	Série B	–		–			4	–			
CRB	2005	Série B		2	–		–		–			
Coruripe	2005	Série C		0	–		–		–			
Santo André	2006	Série B	–		1	0			–			
CRB	2006	Série B	4	1	–				–			
Ceará	2006	Série B		3	–		–		–			
Bahia	2006	Série C			–		–		–			
Vila Nova (GO)	2007	Série C	10	1	–				–			
Fortaleza	2008	Série B			0	0			–			
CRB	2008	Série B	4	0	–		–		–		4	0
ASA	2008	Série C	4	0	–		–		–		4	0
Confiança	2009	Série C	5	0	2	0			–			
Uberlândia	2010	Regional (MG)	–		–		0	0	6 (Note: Six appearances, two goals in 2010 Taça Minas Gerais.)	2		
Uberaba	2011	Regional (MG)	–		2	0	7	0	–		9	0
Salgueiro	2011	Série B	9	0	–		–		–		9	0
Guarany (CE)	2012	Série C	–		–		7	0	–		7	0
Atlético (BA)	2012	Regional (BA)	–		4	0	–		–		4	0
Career total					12	2			6	2		

== Honours ==
- Campeonato Cearense: 2008
- Campeonato Sergipano: 2009
- Campeonato Sul-Mato-Grossense: 2016
