= Rodrigão (footballer, born 1978) =

Brazilian footballer

Personal information
- Full name: Rodrigo Fernandes Alflen
- Date of birth: 14 June 1978 (age 48)
- Place of birth: Santos, Brazil
- Height: 1.83 m (6 ft 0 in)
- Position: Striker

Team information
- Current team: Santos (youth technical coordinator)

Youth career
- 1995–1998: Santos

Senior career*
Years	Team	Apps	(Gls)
1998–2001	Santos	30	(11)
1998	→ Jabaquara (loan)		
2000	→ Internacional (loan)	30	(11)
2001–2004	Saint-Étienne	7	(2)
2002	→ Botafogo (loan)	13	(1)
2003–2004	→ Guarani (loan)	38	(11)
2004	→ Marítimo (loan)	5	(1)
2005	Santo André	17	(7)
2006–2008	Atlético Paranaense	20	(5)
2007	→ Al Hilal (loan)	5	(1)
2007	→ Palmeiras (loan)	16	(6)
2008	→ Vitória (loan)	27	(10)
2009	Guaratinguetá	13	(5)
2009	Indios	12	(1)
2010	Santo André	13	(3)
2011	Anapolina	2	(0)
2012	Independente de Limeira	4	(2)
2012	Jabaquara	13	(9)
2013	Aimoré	7	(2)
2013	Portuguesa Santista	8	(6)
2014	São Carlos	8	(2)
2015	Portuguesa Santista	6	(2)

International career
1999	Brazil U23	1	(1)
- * Club domestic league appearances and goals

Rodrigo Fernandes Alflen (born 14 June 1978), commonly known as Rodrigão, is a Brazilian retired footballer who played as a striker. He is the current youth technical coordinator of Santos.

== Club career ==
Born in Santos, São Paulo, Rodrigão was a Santos FC youth graduate. He made his senior debut while on loan at Jabaquara in 1998, before returning to the club ahead of the 1999 season and being promoted to the first team.

In his first senior season at Peixe, Rodrigão helped the club to reach the finals of the Torneio Rio – São Paulo against Vasco da Gama, and scored ten goals overall. In January 2000, he was loaned to Internacional, with Anderson Luiz moving in the opposite direction.

Rodrigão returned to Santos in January 2001, after Inter did not exercise his buyout clause. After scoring ten goals in just 19 matches, he was sold to French Division 2 side Saint-Étienne.

After being rarely used at the French club, Rodrigão subsequently served loans at Botafogo, Guarani and Marítimo, leaving the latter due to a knee injury and finishing his recovery at Santo André. After being the club's top scorer, he moved to Atlético Paranaense, but spent ten months sidelined after being diagnosed with Hepatitis C.

Back to action, Rodrigão was loaned to Al Hilal in January 2007. He returned to his home country in June, after joining Palmeiras also in a temporary deal.

Despite featuring regularly at Verdão, Rodrigão returned to Atlético in January 2008, but was soon loaned out to Vitória in March. He helped the club to win the Campeonato Baiano with eight goals in just nine matches, including two in a 5–1 home routing of Itabuna which ensured the club's trophy.

After being sparingly used during the 2008 Série A, Rodrigão was announced at Guaratinguetá on 9 December 2008. On 1 July 2009, he moved to Primera División de México side Indios de Ciudad Juárez.

Rodrigão returned to Santo André for the 2010 season, and helped the club to reach the Campeonato Paulista finals, losing to former side Santos. In February 2011, he signed for Anapolina, but only played two matches before suffering a tendon injury which sidelined him for the remainder of the year; he subsequently rescinded his contract in April.

Rodrigão represented Independente de Limeira and Jabaquara during the 2012 season, before playing in the 2013 Campeonato Gaúcho Série A2 with Aimoré. He moved to Portuguesa Santista in July of that year, playing in the Campeonato Paulista Segunda Divisão.

On 5 March 2014, Rodrigão agreed to a deal with São Carlos, and decided to retire in May. In 2015, he returned to Briosa initially as a director of football, but later returned to action.

== International career ==
In 1999, Rodrigão was called up to the Brazil national under-23 team for a friendly against the United States at the Estádio Nacional Mané Garrincha in Brasília. He scored the nation's seventh goal through a penalty kick in the 7–0 win on 7 April.

Rodrigão was also included in the squad for the 2000 Summer Olympics in Sydney, but had to withdraw due to an injury.

== Post-playing career ==
After retiring, Rodrigão played indoor football and worked as a youth coordinator at Jabaquara. On 2 January 2024, he returned to Santos, being named youth technical coordinator.

== Personal life ==
Rodrigão had five-year a relationship with Hortência, between 2005 and 2010.

== Career statistics ==
Appearances and goals by club, season and competition
Club	Season	League			State League		Cup		Continental		Other		Total	
Club	Season	Division	Apps	Goals	Apps	Goals	Apps	Goals	Apps	Goals	Apps	Goals	Apps	Goals
Santos	1999	Série A	9	2	10	4	3	3	—		9 (Note: Eight appearances and one goal in Torneio Rio – São Paulo, one appearance in Seletiva para a Libertadores)	1	31	10
Santos	2000	Copa João Havelange	0	0	0	0	—		—		2 (Note: Appearance(s) in Torneio Rio – São Paulo)	0	2	0
Santos	2001	Série A	0	0	11	5	3	2	—		5	3	19	10
Santos	Total		9	2	21	9	6	5	—		16	4	52	20
Internacional (loan)	2000	Copa João Havelange	19	7	11	4	2	0	—		—		32	11
Saint-Étienne	2001–02	French Division 2	7	2	—		0	0	—		—		7	2
Botafogo (loan)	2002	Série A	13	1	—		—		—		—		13	1
Guarani (loan)	2003	Série A	30	11	7	0	2	2	—		—		39	13
Guarani (loan)	2004	Série A	0	0	1	0	0	0	—		—		1	0
Guarani (loan)	Total		30	11	8	0	2	2	—		—		40	13
Marítimo (loan)	2003–04	Primeira Liga	5	1	—		0	0	—		—		5	1
Santo André	2005	Série A	14	6	3	1	—		6 (Note: Appearance(s) in Copa Libertadores)	5	—		23	12
Atlético Paranaense	2006	Série A	0	0	7	3	2	0	—		—		9	3
Atlético Paranaense	2007	Série A	0	0	6	2	0	0	—		—		6	2
Atlético Paranaense	2008	Série A	0	0	7	0	1	0	—		—		8	0
Atlético Paranaense	Total		0	0	20	5	3	0	—		—		23	5
Al Hilal (loan)	2006–07	Saudi Premier League	5	1	—		4	2	2 (Note: Appearance(s) in AFC Champions League)	3	—		11	6
Palmeiras (loan)	2007	Série A	16	6	—		—		—		—		16	6
Vitória (loan)	2008	Série A	18	2	9	8	1	0	—		—		28	10
Guaratinguetá	2009	Série C	0	0	13	5	—		—		—		13	5
Indios	2009–10	Primera División de México	12	1	—		—		—		—		12	1
Santo André	2010	Série B	5	2	8	1	—		—		—		13	3
Anapolina	2011	Série D	0	0	2	0	—		—		—		2	0
Independente de Limeira	2012	Paulista A3	—		4	2	—		—		—		4	2
Jabaquara	2012	Paulista 2ª Divisão	—		13	9	—		—		—		13	9
Aimoré	2013	Gaúcho Série A2	—		7	2	—		—		—		7	2
Portuguesa Santista	2013	Paulista 2ª Divisão	—		8	6	—		—		—		8	6
São Carlos	2014	Paulista A3	—		8	2	—		—		—		8	2
Portuguesa Santista	2015	Paulista 2ª Divisão	—		6	2	—		—		—		6	2
Career total			153	42	141	56	18	9	8	8	16	4	336	119

== Honours ==
Vitória

- Campeonato Baiano: 2008
