= André Luís Santos =

André Luís Santos is the name of:

- André Luíz Alves Santos (born 1972), Brazilian football forward
- André Luís dos Santos (footballer born 1975), Brazilian defender
- André Bahia, full name André Luiz Bahia dos Santos Viana (born 1983) Brazilian football defender
