= Júlio César (footballer, born 1976) =

Brazilian footballer

Personal information
- Full name: Júlio César António de Souza
- Date of birth: 15 June 1976 (age 50)
- Place of birth: Taquaritinga, Brazil
- Height: 1.72 m (5 ft 8 in)
- Position: Forward

Senior career*
| Years | Team | Apps | (Gls) |
| 2000–2001 | Santos | | |
| 2001–2003 | Gaziantepspor | 56 | (11) |
| 2003 | Santos | | |
| 2004 | Samsunspor | 13 | (0) |
| 2004 | Ponte Preta | | |
| 2005 | União São João | 0 | (0) |
| 2005 | Araçatuba | 0 | (0) |
| 2005 | Kayseri Erciyesspor | 11 | (0) |
| 2006 | Rio Branco (SP) | 0 | (0) |
| 2006 | América (RN) | 18 | (2) |
| 2006 | Galo Maringá | 0 | (0) |
| 2007 | Canedense | 0 | (0) |
| 2007 | CENE | 0 | (0) |
| 2007 | Noroeste | 6 | (1) |
| 2007 | Ituano | 16 | (4) |
| 2008 | Paulista | 3 | (2) |
| 2009 | Catanduvense | 0 | (0) |
| 2009 | Anápolis | 0 | (0) |
| 2009 | Canedense | 0 | (0) |
| 2009 | Rio Verde | 0 | (0) |
| 2010 | Ferroviária | 0 | (0) |
| 2010 | Goianésia | 0 | (0) |
| 2011 | SC Barueri | 0 | (0) |
| 2011 | Ferroviária | 0 | (0) |
| 2011 | Ituiutaba | 6 | (0) |
| 2012 | Rio Preto | 22 | (7) |
| 2014 | Matonense | 8 | (2) |
- * Club domestic league appearances and goals

Júlio César António de Souza (born 15 June 1976), known as just Júlio César, is a Brazilian former professional footballer who played as a forward.

== Career ==
Born in Taquaritinga, São Paulo, Júlio César left for Turkish side Gaziantepspor in September 2001 in a one-year loan from Santos FC. The club also signed three more Brazilian in January 2002, namely Viola, André Santos and Pereira. However, only Júlio César (and Viola) remained in Turkey for another season, signing a three-year contract. After six goals in 2002–03 Süper Lig, both Júlio César (and Viola) returned to their home country, which Júlio César re-joined Santos in short term deal.

In January 2004 Júlio César returned to Turkey for Samsunspor on a 1 1/2-year contract, co-currently Juninho Cearense returned to Brazil. However Júlio César was released again in April 2004. In May he joined Ponte Preta.

In the next season, at first he was signed by União São João. In February he was signed by Araçatuba. In June 2005 Júlio César returned to Turkey again, this time for Kayseri Erciyesspor in one-year deal. However, he was released again in December 2005.

Júlio César was signed by Rio Branco (SP) in January 2006, in April he left for his first domestic club outside São Paulo state, for América (RN). In October he left for Galo Maringá, which become Adap Galo Maringá in November, with whom he played in the 2006 Copa Paraná.

In January 2007 he was signed by Canedense until the end of 2007 Campeonato Goiano. In April he signed a three-month deal with CENE, just before the 2007 Campeonato Brasileiro Série C.

In July 2007 he returned to São Paulo state, for Noroeste in Série C. In August he left for Ituano of 2007 Campeonato Brasileiro Série B. In December 2007 he was signed by Paulista for 2008 Campeonato Paulista and 2008 Campeonato Brasileiro Série C.

In December 2008 he signed a 6 1/2-month contract with Catanduvense, for 2009 Campeonato Paulista Série A2. After played twice, he left the club in February. He left São Paulo state once again for Anápolis of 2009 Campeonato Goiano. After the end of the state league, he left for Canedense which the club relegated to 2009 Campeonato Goiano Second Division. In November 2009 he was signed by Rio Verde for the last phase of 2009 Campeonato Goiano Third Division.

In January 2010 he left for Ferroviária. In July he was signed by Goianésia, finished as the runner-up of 2010 Campeonato Goiano Second Division.

In 2011 Júlio César returned to São Paulo state for Sport Club Barueri in 2011 Campeonato Paulista Série A3, however after played twice he left for Ferroviária again and played in 2011 Campeonato Paulista Série A2. In March 2011 he was signed by Ituiutaba and played a few times in 2011 Campeonato Brasileiro Série B. He was released again in July.

In January 2012 he joined Rio Preto, playing a nearly full first season but only four games in the 2013 season. In 2014 he signed with Matonense, retiring from football after playing only eight games that season.
