= Svetlin Simeonov =

Bulgarian footballer

Personal information
- Full name: Svetlin Ivanov Simeonov
- Date of birth: 24 August 1975 (age 51)
- Place of birth: Vratsa, Bulgaria
- Height: 1.82 m (6 ft 0 in)
- Position: Midfielder

Senior career*
Years	Team	Apps	(Gls)
1995–2000	Botev Vratsa	130	(30)
2001	Alania	0	(0)
2001–2002	Lokomotiv Sofia	48	(5)
2003	Adanaspor	31	(3)
2004	Lokomotiv Sofia	10	(1)
2004–2006	Spartak Pleven	52	(17)
2006–2008	Dunav Ruse	46	(7)
2008	Naftex Burgas	14	(3)
2009	Chernomorets Burgas	9	(2)
2010	Dunav Ruse	25	(2)
2011	Botev Vratsa	13	(2)
- * Club domestic league appearances and goals

Svetlin Ivanov Simeonov (Bulgarian: Светлин Иванов Симеонов; born 24 August 1975 in Vratsa) is a retired Bulgarian football midfielder.

== Career ==
In his career he played for Botev Vratsa, Russian side Alania Vladikavkaz, Lokomotiv Sofia, Turkish Adanaspor, Spartak Pleven, Dunav Ruse, Naftex Burgas and Chernomorets Burgas. Between 1995 and 1996 Simeonov is a part of Bulgaria national under-21 football team. For Bulgaria U21, Simeonov was capped eight times, scoring three goals.
