= Rodrigo Costa (footballer, born 1975) =

Brazilian footballer

Personal information
- Full name: Rodrigo Barbosa Rodrigues Costa
- Date of birth: 30 July 1975 (age 51)
- Place of birth: Laranjal Paulista, Brazil
- Height: 1.86 m (6 ft 1 in)
- Position: Central defender

Youth career
- XV de Novembro (Piracicaba)

Senior career*
Years	Team	Apps	(Gls)
1993–1994	C.S. Marítimo		
1995	Palmeiras		
1995	Guarani		
1996	Palmeiras		
1997	Juventude		
1998–2001	Grêmio		
2002	Santos	0	(0)
2002–2006	1860 Munich	106	(4)
2006	Standard Liège	1	(0)
2007	Cerro Porteño		
2007	TSV Hoffenheim DE		
2009	Marília		
2010	Resende		
2012	Comercial		
- * Club domestic league appearances and goals

Rodrigo Barbosa Rodrigues Costa (born 30 July 1975) is a Brazilian former professional footballer who played as a central defender.

== Career ==
Costa was born in Laranjal Paulista.

He played for C.S. Marítimo in the 1994–95 UEFA Cup.

In February 2002, he left Brazil again, for 1860 Munich. After four and a half seasons, he left for Standard Liège.

In his last year in Munich, he just played in the DFB-Pokal.
