= Russo (footballer, born 1976) =

Brazilian footballer

Personal information
- Full name: Ricardo Soares Florêncio
- Date of birth: 16 June 1976 (age 50)
- Place of birth: Olinda, Brazil
- Height: 1.78 m (5 ft 10 in)
- Position: Defender

Youth career
- Sport

Senior career*
Years	Team	Apps	(Gls)
1995–1996	Sport	20	(1)
1997	Vitória	19	(1)
1998	Cruzeiro		
1998	Sport	22	(0)
1999	Vitória		
1999	Botafogo de Ribeirão Preto	11	(0)
2000	Sport		
2001	Santos	19	(2)
2002	São Caetano	12	(0)
2002–2003	Vasco da Gama	44	(1)
2003	FC Spartak Moscow	1	(0)
2004–2005	Sport		
2006–2007	Santa Cruz		

International career
1997–1998	Brazil	5	(0)
- * Club domestic league appearances and goals

Ricardo Soares Florêncio, known as Russo (born 16 June 1976 in Olinda), is a retired Brazilian footballer who played as a defender.

At club level, Russo played for Sport, Vitória, Cruzeiro, Botafogo, Santos, São Caetano, Santos and Spartak Moscow.

He won the FIFA Confederations Cup with the Brazilian squad in 1997, but did not feature in any matches.

He played 1 game in the 2003–04 UEFA Cup for FC Spartak Moscow.
