= Júnior (footballer, born 1979) =

Brazilian footballer

Personal information
- Full name: Aluísio da Silva Neves Júnior
- Date of birth: 25 March 1979 (age 47)
- Place of birth: Conceição de Macabu, Brazil
- Height: 1.83 m (6 ft 0 in)
- Position: Midfielder

Senior career*
Years	Team	Apps	(Gls)
1999–2002	Botafogo	31	(1)
2002–2004	Bursaspor	53	(4)
2004–2005	Rapid București	6	(0)
2006	Paysandu		
2007	Tombense		
2008	Nacional de Patos		
2008	Madureira		
2008–2010	Dibba Al-Hisn		
2010–2013	Dibba Al-Fuhairah		
2013–2014	Masafi		
- * Club domestic league appearances and goals as of 13 June 2008

Aluísio da Silva Neves Júnior (born 25 March 1979), better known as Júnior, is a Brazilian former professional footballer who played as a midfielder.

== Career ==
Júnior played for Botafogo in the Campeonato Brasileiro Série A and Paysandu and Nacional de Patos in the Copa do Brasil. He also had a spell with Bursaspor in the Turkish Süper Lig.
