= Fábio de los Santos =

Argentine footballer

Personal information
- Full name: Fábio Ramon Rosa de los Santos
- Date of birth: 25 March 1972 (age 54)
- Place of birth: Rosario, Argentina
- Height: 1.77 m (5 ft 10 in)
- Position: Left wing back

Youth career
- 1999: CA Rosario Central

Senior career*
Years	Team	Apps	(Gls)
2000	EC São José	19	(6)
2001	Grêmio FBPA	13	(2)
2002	Botafogo FC	7	(1)
2002	Mogi Mirim EC	10	(2)
2002	Grêmio FBS	10	(2)
2003	SE Gama	17	(4)
2004	Criciúma EC	22	(7)
2004	GE Glória	2	(0)
2005	Chapecoense		
2007	Pelotas		
- * Club domestic league appearances and goals as of 23 November 2009 ‡ National team caps and goals as of 3 May 2009

Fábio Ramon Rosa de los Santos (born 25 March 1972) is a former Argentine football player.

Rosa played for Grêmio FBPA and Botafogo-SP in the Campeonato Brasileiro.
