= Canindé (footballer) =

Brazilian footballer (born 1980)

Personal information
- Full name: Márcio Caetano Alves
- Date of birth: 7 December 1980 (age 45)
- Place of birth: Canindé de São Francisco, Brazil
- Height: 1.74 m (5 ft 9 in)
- Position: Midfielder

Senior career*
Years	Team	Apps	(Gls)
1999–2003	Santos		
2003–2004	Paulista		
2004	Paraná		
2005–2009	São Caetano		
2008	→ Criciúma (loan)		
2008	→ Santa Cruz (loan)		
2009	→ Vila Nova (loan)		
2010	Linense		
2010	Remo		
2011	Monte Azul		
2013	Canindé		
2016	Guarany-SE		
- * Club domestic league appearances and goals as of 25 October 2023

Márcio Caetano Alves (born 7 December 1980), better known as Canindé, is a Brazilian former professional footballer who played as a midfielder.

== Career ==
Canindé came to Santos where he was Brazilian champion in 2002. In 2004 he was part of the squad of Paulista, runner-up in the Campeonato Paulista. He ended his career playing in the second division of Sergipe.

== Honours ==
Santos

- Campeonato Brasileiro: 2002

Linense

- Campeonato Paulista Série A2: 2010
