= André Santos (footballer, born 1975) =

Brazilian footballer

André Luís dos Santos known as André Santos (born 22 January 1975) is a former Brazilian footballer.

== Biography ==
André Santos was signed by Turkish club Gaziantepspor from Associação Atlética Ponte Preta in January 2002. He played 17 games in 2001–02 Süper Lig. In July 2002 his contract was terminated.

In April 2005 he was signed by Ceará Sporting Club in 6-month contract. In December 2005 he was signed by Associação Atlética Aparecidense until the end of 2006 Campeonato Goiano. In July, he left for Goiânia Esporte Clube. His contract was extended in November 2006, to the end of 2007 Campeonato Goiano. He then joined Morrinhos Futebol Clube and transferred to Trindade Atlético Clube in January 2008. In June 2008 he was re-signed by Goiânia but released in August.
