= Estádio Major José Levy Sobrinho =

Soccer stadium in Limeira, Brazil

Coordinates: 22°33′19.06″S 47°23′06.15″W

- Limeirão
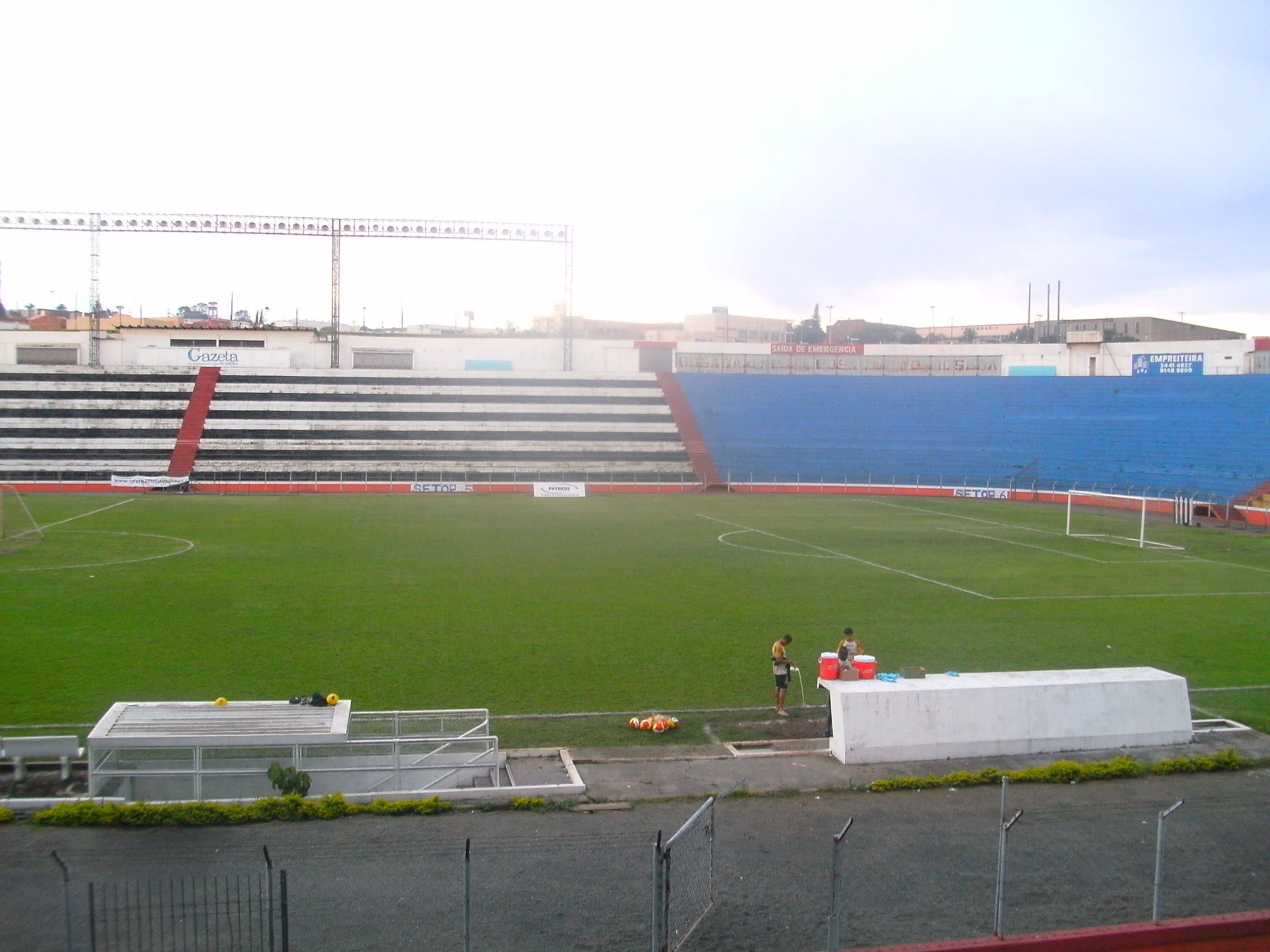
- Sisbrace
- Interactive map of Estádio Major José Levy Sobrinho
- Location: Limeira, São Paulo state, Brazil
- Owner: Municipality of Limeira
- Capacity: 18,000
- Surface: Natural grass
- Field size: 105 by 68 metres (114.8 yd × 74.4 yd)

Construction
- Built: 1977
- Opened: January 30, 1977

Tenant
- Associação Atlética Internacional

Estádio Major José Levy Sobrinho, also known as Limeirão, is a multi-purpose stadium in Limeira, in the Brazilian state of São Paulo. It is currently used mostly for football matches. The stadium has a capacity of 18,000 people. It was built in 1977.

Estádio Major José Levy Sobrinho is owned by the Limeira City Hall. The stadium is named after Major José Levy Sobrinho, who donated the ground plot where the stadium was built. Associação Atlética Internacional usually plays its home matches at the stadium.

== History ==
In 1977, the works on Estádio Major José Levy Sobrinho were completed. The inaugural match was played on January 30 of that year, when Sport Club Corinthians Paulista beat AA Internacional 3–2. The first goal of the stadium was scored by Internacional's Tião Mariano. The stadium's attendance record, 44,000, was also set in the inaugural match.
