= Dodô (footballer, born 1974) =

Brazilian football coach and former player

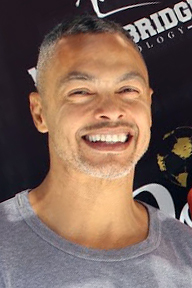

Personal information
- Full name: Ricardo Lucas Figueredo Monte Raso
- Date of birth: 2 May 1974 (age 52)
- Place of birth: São Paulo, Brazil
- Height: 1.77 m (5 ft 10 in)
- Position: Striker

Youth career
- 1992–1994: Nacional (SP)
- 1994: → Fluminense (loan)

Senior career*
Years	Team	Apps	(Gls)
1992–1994	Nacional (SP)	30	(11)
1994	→ Fluminense (loan)	0	(0)
1995–1999	São Paulo	46	(32)
1996	→ Paraná (loan)	0	(0)
1999–2001	Santos	67	(33)
2001–2002	Botafogo	29	(10)
2002	Palmeiras	16	(3)
2003–2004	Hyundai Horang-i	62	(33)
2005	Oita Trinita	15	(3)
2005	Goiás	15	(4)
2006	Botafogo	12	(9)
2006	Al Ain	8	(2)
2007	Botafogo	27	(15)
2008	Fluminense	16	(5)
2010	Vasco da Gama	4	(0)
2010–2011	Portuguesa	16	(10)
2011	Americana	9	(5)
2013	Grêmio Osasco		
2013	Barra da Tijuca		

International career
1997	Brazil	5	(2)

Managerial career
- 2016: Rio Negro
- * Club domestic league appearances and goals as of 10:23, 22 January 2012

Ricardo Lucas Figueredo Monte Raso, known as Dodô (born 2 May 1974 in São Paulo), is a Brazilian football coach and former footballer who played as a striker.

== Career ==
Dodô has played for several clubs in Brazil, including São Paulo, Santos, Botafogo and Fluminense. He also spent time in Japan, South Korea and the UAE, enjoying success with Ulsan Hyundai Horangi in the K-League.

On 11 September 2008, the Court of Arbitration for Sport suspended Dodô from playing professional football for two years as a result of a failed doping test. He tested positive for the use of Fenproporex following a match between Botofogo and Vasco da Gama on 14 June 2007.

In January 2010, after the suspension has finished, Dodô signed a contract with Vasco da Gama for his comeback to football. Dodô scored 11 goals in 28 appearances for the club, four in a single match against Botafogo. However, two penalties missed on the derby against Flamengo, ended his spell with the club.

On 14 June 2010, Dodô transferred to Portuguesa and announced his wishes to end his career in the club.

On 27 April 2011, he was keen to extend his career and signed a one-year deal with Americana

He was still by the Grêmio Osasco in February 2013 and one month after hit with Barra da Tijuca in the dispute of the Campeonato Carioca Série B

Without act since 2013, Dodo has a course to coach at the beginning of this year taught by CBF, with duration of ten days and classes divided into two periods and after that conclusion, cmo debut coach in Rio Negro.

== Club statistics ==
Appearances and goals by club, season and competition
Club	Season	League			State league		Cup		Continental		Other		Total	
Club	Season	Division	Apps	Goals	Apps	Goals	Apps	Goals	Apps	Goals	Apps	Goals	Apps	Goals
Fluminense	1994	Série A	0	0	1	0	–		–		–		1	0
São Paulo	1995	Série A	2	1	14	1	3	1	–		–		19	3
Paraná	1996	Série A	0	0	–		4	0	–		–		4	0
São Paulo	1997	Série A	22	21	26	20	4	3	10	6	1	0	63	50
São Paulo	1998	Série A	22	10	9	3	5	2	5	3	8	5	49	23
São Paulo	1999	Série A	0	0	15	8	4	1	0	0	8	3	27	12
São Paulo	Total		44	31	50	31	13	15	9	0	17	8	139	85
Santos	1999	Série A	21	13	–		–		–		2	0	23	13
Santos	2000	Série A	24	10	17	8	7	6	–		6	3	54	27
Santos	2001	Série A	0	0	13	10	3	1	–		5	3	21	14
Santos	Total		45	23	30	18	10	7	0	0	13	6	98	54
Botafogo	2001	Série A	15	6	–		–		–		–		15	6
Botafogo	2002	Série A	0	0	6	5	6	4	–		15	17	27	26
Botafogo	Total		15	6	6	5	6	4	0	0	15	17	42	32
Palmeiras	2002	Série A	16	3	–		–		–		–		16	3
Palmeiras	2003	Série A	0	0	1	0	–		–		–		1	0
Palmeiras	Total		16	3	1	0	0	0	0	0	0	0	17	3
Ulsan Hyundai Horangi	2003	K-League	23	30	–		–		–		–		23	30
Ulsan Hyundai Horangi	2004	K-League	5	6	–		–		–		–		5	6
Ulsan Hyundai Horangi	Total		28	36	0	0	0	0	0	0	0	0	28	36
Oita Trinita	2004	J1 League	16	4	–		–		–		–		16	4
Goiás	2005	Série A	15	4	–		–		–		–		15	4
Botafogo	2006	Série A	12	9	11	9	4	4	–		–		27	22
Al-Ain	2006	UAE League	8	4	–		–		–		–		8	4
Botafogo	2007	Série A	27	15	14	13	8	4	3	2	–		52	34
Fluminense	2008	Série A	16	4	8	3	–		9	4	–		33	12
Vasco da Gama	2008	Série A	4	0	17	11	6	0	–		–		27	11
Portuguesa	2010	Série B	16	10	–		–		–		–		16	10
Portuguesa	2011	Série B	0	0	4	0	1	0	–		–		5	0
Portuguesa	Total		16	10	4	0	1	0	0	0	0	0	21	10
Career total			264	150	156	91	55	35	27	15	45	31	547	322

== National team statistics ==
Brazil national team
Year	Apps	Goals
1997	5	2
Total	5	2

== Honours ==
- Paraná State Championship: 1996
- São Paulo State Championship: 1998
- Rio de Janeiro State Championship: 2006

== Personal honours ==
- São Paulo State League's top scorer: 1997
- Rio-São Paulo Tournament's top scorer: 1998
- Rio de Janeiro State League's top scorer: 2006, 2007

== International goals ==
Results list Brazil's goal tally first.

Date	Venue	Opponent	Score	Result	Competition
7 September 1997	Salvador, Brazil	Ecuador	2 goals	4–2	Friendly match
