= Alfredo Loebeling =

Brazilian football (born 1962)

- Full name: Alfredo dos Santos Loebeling
- Born: 2 January 1962 (age 64); São Paulo, Brazil

Domestic
Years	League	Role
1990–2002	FPF	
1992–2002	CBF	
2001–2002	CONMEBOL; FIFA	Referee

Alfredo dos Santos Loebeling (born 2 January 1962), is a Brazilian former football referee and a sports commentator.

== Career ==
Alfredo Loebeling began his career as a professional referee in 1990, having refereed the first match between Marília and Nacional in Campeonato Paulista Série A3. Loebeling refereed 732 official matches, including 17 state finals, including 2 Campeonato Paulista finals (2000, 2001). He was elected the best referee in São Paulo in 2000 and 2001.

In 2001, he joined as a FIFA member, but left in 2002 when he ended his career as a referee after accusing the director of the CBF, Armando Marques, of pressuring him to lie in the summary of the match between Caxias and Figueirense for the final match of 2001 Campeonato Brasileiro Série B, which was ended before the end of the 90 minutes due to the pitch invasion by Figueirense supporters. Loebeling stopped the game, but told the Caxias captain and local radio stations that the match would continue. However, as supporters had taken away uniforms, nets and balls, the match could not be restarted. In the official match document, he was forced to change his version of the facts.

Loebeling became part of the São Paulo federation's arbitration board from 2002 to 2005, in addition to becoming a columnist for Jornal Agora. He graduated in political science from Faculdade São Marcos do Ipiranga University, worked as a director at Grêmio Barueri in 2006, and was an assistant at the São Paulo city council from 2009 to 2012. Loebeling also worked at some broadcasting stations such as Record and TV Gazeta.
