= Fábio Costa =

Brazilian footballer (born 1977)

Fabio Costa
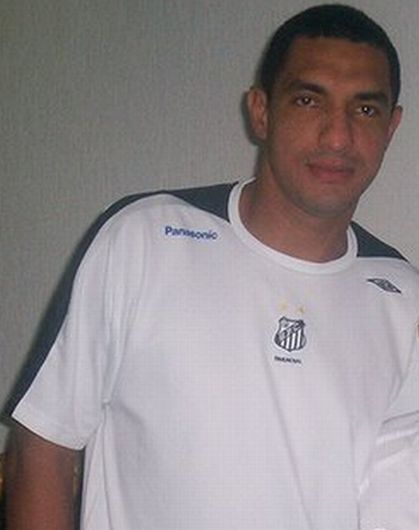

Personal information
- Full name: Fabio Costa
- Date of birth: 27 November 1977 (age 48)
- Place of birth: Camaçari, Brazil
- Height: 1.87 m (6 ft 1 1/2 in)
- Position: Goalkeeper

Youth career
- 1991–1992: Bahia
- 1993: Cruzeiro
- 1994: PSV Eindhoven
- 1995–1996: Vitória

Senior career*
Years	Team	Apps	(Gls)
1997–2000	Vitória	28	(0)
2000–2003	Santos	63	(0)
2004–2005	Corinthians	76	(0)
2006–2013	Santos	86	(0)
2010–2011	→ Atlético Mineiro (loan)	16	(0)
2013	→ São Caetano (loan)	2	(0)
Total		271	(0)

International career
1999–2000	Brazil U23	6	(0)
- * Club domestic league appearances and goals

Fabio Costa (born 27 November 1977 in Camaçari, Bahia) is a former Brazilian goalkeeper.

== Career ==
Costa played for Brazil under-23 and won the 1996 Toulon Tournament and the 2000 South American Pre-Olympic Tournament. He was part of the Brazil under-23 team that competed at the 2000 Summer Olympics in Sydney, headed by coach Luxemburgo.

Still uncapped for the senior national team, he was summoned by coach Emerson Leão for the 2001 FIFA Confederations Cup to be hosted by Japan and South Korea, but did not enter the field during the competition.

In 2010, he played only in the international friendly between Santos x Red Bull / NY.

On 16 December 2013, Costa, who has his contract ended on the last day of the year, announced his retirement of football. According to him: "It was 21 years as a professional footballer, I have played since I was 15 years old. I lost my joy of playing. I have no hurts from Santos; I just stay sad for being not chosen."

== Honours ==
=== Club ===
Vitória

- Bahia State League: 1995, 1996, 1997
- Nordeste Cup: 1997, 1998
- Brazilian Cup: 1997

Santos

- Brazilian League: 2002
- São Paulo State League: 2006, 2007

Corinthians

- Brazilian League: 2005

=== International ===
Brazil U23

- Toulon Tournament: 1996
- Pre-Olympic Tournament: 2000

=== Individual ===
- Bola de Prata: 2005
- Campeonato Brasileiro Série A Team of the Year: 2005
