= Milton do Ó =

Brazilian footballer

Personal information
- Full name: Milton Rogério Harassen do Ó
- Date of birth: February 24, 1979 (age 47)
- Place of birth: Ponta Grossa, Brazil
- Height: 1.82 m (5 ft 11 1/2 in)
- Position: Defender

Senior career*
Years	Team	Apps	(Gls)
2000	Paraná		
2000	Atlético Paranaense		
2002–2003	Goiás	24	(1)
2003–2004	Samsunspor	20	(1)
2004	Madureira		
2004	Vitória	10	(0)
2005	Inter de Limeira		
2005	Fluminense	13	(2)
2006–2007	Marítimo	18	(0)
2007–2010	Trofense	58	(1)

International career
1999	Brazil U20		

Managerial career
- 2018: Cascavel
- * Club domestic league appearances and goals

Milton Rogério Harassen do Ó (born 24 February 1979) is a Brazilian retired footballer who played professionally as a defender in Brazil, Portugal and Turkey, and is the current manager.

A native of Ponta Grossa, the second-largest city in southern Brazil's state of Paraná, Milton do Ó had a minor stint in the early 2000s in Turkey's Süper Lig. He returned home to play with a number of Brazilian clubs, and while a member of Rio de Janeiro's Fluminense, signed with the Portuguese club CS Marítimo (2005–07).

Milton do Ó played for Brazil at the 1999 FIFA World Youth Championship in Nigeria.
