= Caíco =

Brazilian footballer (born 1974)

Caíco Santos
Personal information
- Full name: Aírton Graciliano dos Santos
- Date of birth: 15 May 1974 (age 52)
- Place of birth: Porto Alegre, Brazil
- Height: 1.70 m (5 ft 7 in)
- Position: Midfielder

Senior career*
Years	Team	Apps	(Gls)
1992–1995	Internacional		
1996	Verdy Kawasaki		
1996	Flamengo		
1997	Santos		
1998	Atlético Paranaense		
1998–2000	Santos		
2001	Atlético Mineiro		
2001	Lugano		
2002	Ponte Preta		
2003	Goiás		
2003–2005	Leiria		
2005	Juventude		
2006–2007	Marítimo		
2007	Coritiba		
2008	Itumbiara		
2008	Vila Nova		
2009	Itumbiara		

International career
1993	Brazil U-20		
- * Club domestic league appearances and goals

Aírton Graciliano dos Santos (born 15 May 1974), commonly known as Caíco, is a Brazilian former football player.

== Club statistics ==
Club performance			League		Cup		League Cup		Total	
Season	Club	League	Apps	Goals	Apps	Goals	Apps	Goals	Apps	Goals
Japan			League		Emperor's Cup		J.League Cup		Total	
1996	Verdy Kawasaki	J1 League	13	1	0	0	11	3	24	4
Total			13	1	0	0	11	3	24	4

== Honours ==
Internacional

- Campeonato Gaúcho: 1992, 1994
- Copa do Brasil: 1992

Santos

- Torneio Rio-São Paulo: 1997

Atlético Paranaense

- Campeonato Paranaense: 1998

Atlético Mineiro

- Campeonato Mineiro: 2000

Itumbiara

- Campeonato Goiano: 2008

Brazil

- Toulon Tournament: 1993
- FIFA World Youth Championship: 1993
