= Robert (footballer, born 1971) =

Brazilian footballer

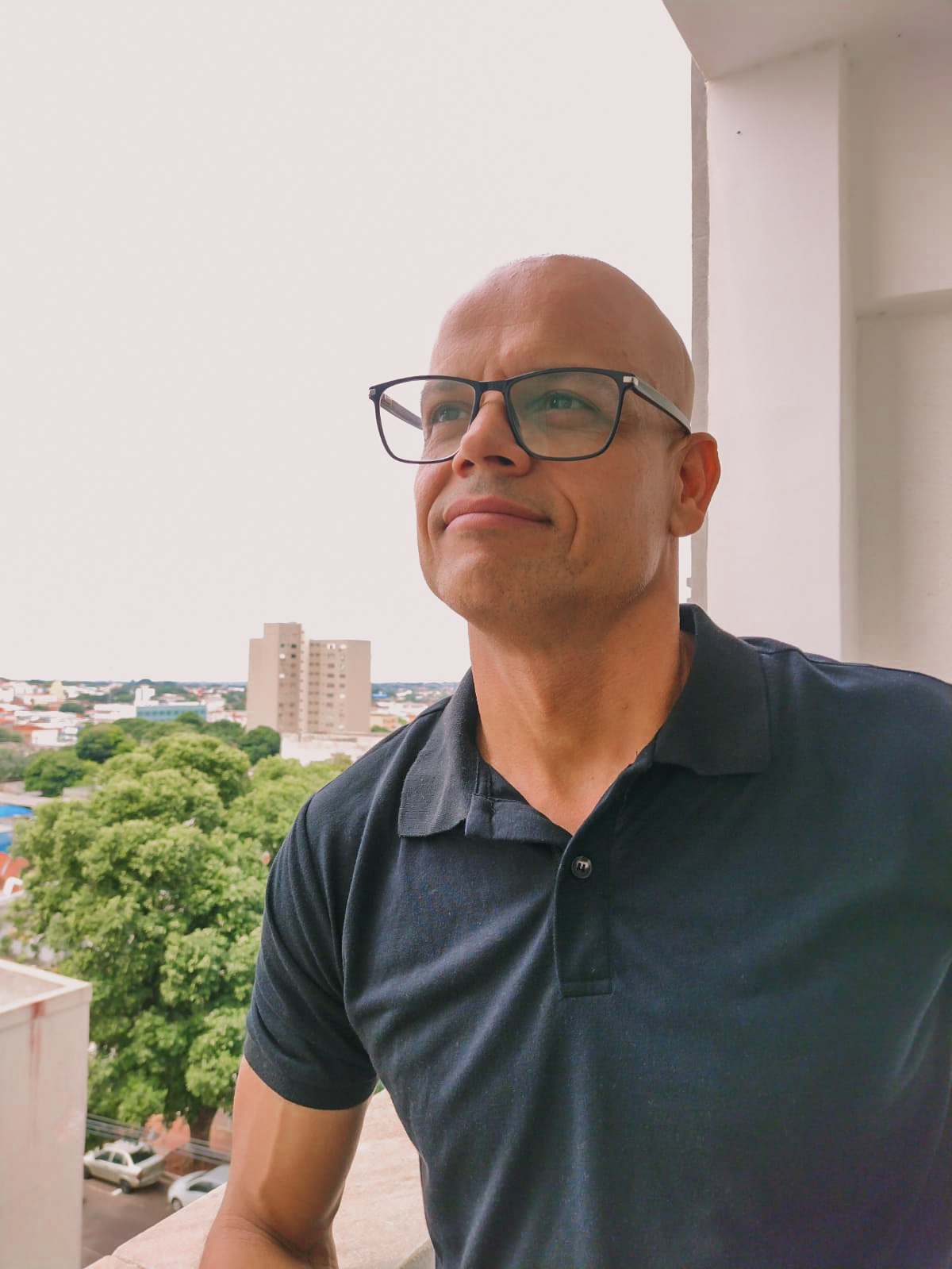

Personal information
- Full name: Robert da Silva Almeida
- Date of birth: 3 April 1971 (age 55)
- Place of birth: Salvador, Brazil
- Height: 1.72 m (5 ft 8 in)
- Position: Midfielder

Senior career*
Years	Team	Apps	(Gls)
1986–1991	Olaria		
1992–1994	Guarani		
1995–1996	Rio Branco		
1996–1997	Santos		
1997–1998	Grêmio		
1999	Atlético Mineiro		
2000–2002	Santos		
2002	São Caetano		
2002–2003	Santos		
2003	Consadole Sapporo		
2003	Corinthians		
2004–2005	Bahia		
2006	América		

International career^{‡}
2001	Brazil	3	(0)

Managerial career
- 2015: Corinthians USA
- 2017: Novoperário
- * Club domestic league appearances and goals as of 6 February 2007 ‡ National team caps and goals as of 6 February 2007

Robert da Silva Almeida, best known as Robert (born 3 April 1971 in Salvador), is a Brazilian former professional footballer who played as a midfielder and currently professional football manager.

== Career statistics ==
=== Club ===
Club performance			League	
Season	Club	League	Apps	Goals
Brazil			League	
1988	Fluminense	Série A	7	0
1989	Bragantino	Série B	0	0
1990	Bragantino	Série A	2	0
1991	Bragantino	Série A	1	0
1992	Guarani	Série A	0	0
1993	Guarani	Série A	15	0
1994	Rio Branco		0	0
1995	Santos	Série A	25	2
1996	Santos	Série A	19	0
1997	Grêmio	Série A	1	0
1998	Grêmio	Série A	8	0
1999	Atlético Mineiro	Série A	20	4
2000	Santos	Série A	23	5
2001	Santos	Série A	21	5
2002	Santos	Série A	12	2
Japan			League	
2003	Consadole Sapporo	J2 League	17	5
Brazil			League	
2003	Corinthians Paulista	Série A	18	1
Country	Brazil		172	19
Country	Japan		17	5
Total			189	24

=== International ===
Brazil national team
Year	Apps	Goals
2001	3	0
Total	3	0

=== Performances in Major International Tournaments ===
Team	Competition	Category	Apps	Goals	Team Record
Brazil	2001 FIFA Confederations Cup	Senior	3	0	4th place

== Honours ==
Santos

- Torneio Rio-São Paulo: 1997
- Campeonato Brasileiro Série A: 2002

Grêmio

- Copa Sul: 1999
- Campeonato Gaúcho: 1998

Atlético Mineiro

- Campeonato Mineiro: 1999
