= Rogério Gaúcho =

Brazilian footballer

Gaúcho
Personal information
- Full name: Rogério Márcio Botelho
- Date of birth: 28 September 1979 (age 47)
- Place of birth: Assis Chateaubriand, Paraná, Brazil
- Height: 1.83 m (6 ft 0 in)
- Position: Striker

Youth career
- Matsubara

Senior career*
Years	Team	Apps	(Gls)
1997–1998	Juventus-SP		
1998–1999	Mallorca		
1999–2001	Santos		
2001	Levski Sofia	16	(0)
2002–2003	Krylia Sovetov	38	(8)
2004	Internacional	2	(0)
2005	União Barbarense		
2005	Sigma Olomouc (loan)	6	(2)
2006–2007	Slavia Praha	36	(7)
2008	Senec	15	(8)
2008–2010	Slovan Bratislava	23	(4)
2013	Toledo		
- * Club domestic league appearances and goals

Rogério Márcio Botelho known as Rogério Gaúcho or just Gaúcho (born 28 September 1979) is a Brazilian former footballer.

== Football career ==
He joined A PFG powerhouse Levski Sofia in 2001, making his league debut on 4 March in the 3:0 win over Beroe. Gaúcho signed a contract until the end of 2006 with União Barbarense on 20 April 2005. He left for SK Sigma Olomouc in August 2005. In January 2006, he signed for Slavia Praha.

== Honours ==
Levski Sofia

- Bulgarian A PFG: 2000–01

SK Slovan Bratislava

- Slovak Super Liga: 2008–09
- Slovak Cup: 2009–10
- Slovak Super Cup: 2009
