= Pitarelli =

Brazilian footballer

Personal information
- Full name: Adriano Pitarelli
- Date of birth: 9 March 1975 (age 51)
- Place of birth: Jales, Brazil
- Height: 1.93 m (6 ft 4 in)
- Position: Goalkeeper

Youth career
- 1990–1994: Guarani

Senior career*
Years	Team	Apps	(Gls)
1994–1995	Guarani		
1996	Mogi Mirim		
1996–1999	Guarani		
1999	Sport Recife		
2000	Portuguesa Santista		
2000–2001	Santos	23	(0)
2002	Gama	24	(0)
2003	Mogi Mirim		
2003–2004	Marco	8	(0)
2004	Oeste		
2004	Avaí		
2005	União Barbarense		
2005	América-SP		
2006	CENE		
2007	Rio Preto		
2007-2008	Sertãozinho		
2009	Rio Preto		
2009	Francana		
2009	Ituano		
2011	Santacruzense	22	(0)
- * Club domestic league appearances and goals

Adriano Pitarelli (born 9 March 1975), known as Pitarelli, is a Brazilian retired footballer who played as a goalkeeper.
