= Sangaletti =

Brazilian footballer and manager

Personal information
- Full name: Marcelo Antônio Sangaletti
- Date of birth: 1 June 1971 (age 55)
- Place of birth: Dois Córregos, Brazil
- Height: 1.80 m (5 ft 11 in)
- Position: Center back

Youth career
- 1991: XV de Jaú

Senior career*
Years	Team	Apps	(Gls)
1992–1995	Juventus		
1995–1996	Guarani	24	(1)
1997	Corinthians	13	(1)
1998–2000	Sport	35	(0)
2000	Santos	12	(0)
2001	Náutico		
2001	Guarani	17	(1)
2002	Náutico		
2002	Guarani	14	(1)
2003–2005	Internacional	54	(1)
- * Club domestic league appearances and goals

Marcelo Antônio Sangaletti (born 1 June 1971), also known as Sangaletti, is a Brazilian former professional footballer and manager who played as a center back and a defensive midfielder. He last managed Esporte Clube Noroeste.

Sangaletti was born in Dois Córregos and started his professional career with Juventus. He had spells with Guarani, Náutico, Sport, Corinthians and Internacional, where he played his last three seasons.
