= Wellington (footballer, born September 1981) =

Brazilian footballer

Personal information
- Full name: Wellington Katzor de Oliveira
- Date of birth: 4 September 1981 (age 45)
- Place of birth: Santos, Brazil
- Height: 1.77 m (5 ft 9 1/2 in)
- Position: Midfielder

Youth career
- 1998–2000: Santos

Senior career*
Years	Team	Apps	(Gls)
2000–2003	Santos	28	(0)
2001	→ Brasiliense (loan)		
2004–2005	Internacional	75	(2)
2006	Juventude	32	(1)
2007	Hapoel Tel Aviv	2	(0)
2007	São Caetano		
2008	América Mineiro		
2009	Avispa Fukuoka	25	(0)
2010	Giravanz Kitakyushu	28	(0)
2011	Red Bull Brasil	12	(0)
2011–2012	Paulista	17	(0)
2013–2014	Ratchaburi	3	(0)
2014–2015	São Paulo-RS	10	(2)
2015	Juventus-SP	9	(0)
- * Club domestic league appearances and goals

Wellington Katzor de Oliveira (born September 4, 1981), known as just Wellington, is a Brazilian retired footballer who played as a midfielder. He played for Avispa Fukuoka and Giravanz Kitakyushu of J2 League in Japan.

== Honours ==
Santos

- Campeonato Brasileiro Série A: 2002

Internacional

- Campeonato Gaúcho: 2004, 2005

Hapoel Tel Aviv

- Israel State Cup: 2006–07

América Mineiro

- Campeonato Mineiro Módulo II: 2008
