= Aílton (footballer, born 1980) =

Brazilian footballer

Personal information
- Full name: Aílton de Oliveira Modesto
- Date of birth: 27 February 1980 (age 46)
- Place of birth: Votuporanga, Brazil
- Height: 1.74 m (5 ft 9 in)
- Position: Midfielder

Youth career
- –1998: Santos

Senior career*
Years	Team	Apps	(Gls)
1999–2001	Santos	19	(1)
2001	Kawasaki Frontale	10	(2)
2002	Santos		
2003	Santo André		
2004	Matonense		
2004–2005	Portimonense	27	(5)
2005	Juventus-SP		
2005–2006	Panachaiki	10	(1)
2006	Apollon Kalamarias	3	(0)
2006–2007	AEP Paphos	5	(0)
2007	Londrina		
2007–2008	CRAC		
2008	União de Rondonópolis		
2008	Santa Helena		
2008	ASA de Arapiraca		
2009	Dibba Al Hisn		
2009	Brusque		
2009	Mixto		
2009	Brusque		
2009–2010	Morrinhos		
2010	Sinop		
2011	Operário		
2013	Tiradentes-CE		
2014	Votuporanguense		
- * Club domestic league appearances and goals

Aílton de Oliveira Modesto (born 27 February 1980), known as Aílton, is a Brazilian former professional footballer who played as a midfielder.
