= Carlos Galván =

Argentine footballer

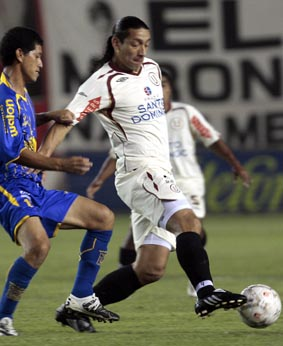

Personal information
- Full name: Carlos Alberto Galván
- Date of birth: October 28, 1973 (age 53)
- Place of birth: Pontevedra, Argentina
- Height: 1.82 m (6 ft 0 in)
- Positions: Centre-back; sweeper

Team information
- Current team: Sport Loreto (Head coach)

Youth career
- Racing Club

Senior career*
Years	Team	Apps	(Gls)
1992–1998	Racing Club	115	(2)
1998–2000	Atlético Mineiro	34	(2)
2000–2002	Santos	20	(1)
2002–2003	Lanús	63	(2)
2004	Ciudad de Murcia	4	(0)
2004	Paysandu	7	(0)
2004–2005	Argentinos Juniors	36	(1)
2005–2006	Olimpia	?	(?)
2006–2007	Banfield	33	(1)
2007–2012	Universitario de Deportes	150	(8)
2012–2014	UCV	36	(0)

International career
1996	Argentina U-23		

Managerial career
- 2013–2014: UCV (assistant)
- 2014: UCV
- 2014–2015: UCV (youth)
- 2015: Willy Serrato
- 2016: Comerciantes Unidos (assistant)
- 2016–2017: Willy Serrato
- 2017: Los Caimanes
- 2018: Sport Loreto
- 2018: Deportivo Hualgayoc
- 2018: Sport Rosario (assistant)
- 2019: Chavelines Juniors
- * Club domestic league appearances and goals

Carlos Alberto Galván (born 28 October 1973 in Pontevedra, Buenos Aires) is an Argentine retired footballer who played as a defender and football coach.

== Club career ==
Galván started his career at Racing Club de Avellaneda in 1992, before moving to Brazil in 1998 to play for Clube Atlético Mineiro, after being part of 1997 Copa Libertadores semifinalists.

In his Racing years, the club suffered a great time with no titles in Argentine league, between 1966 and 2001. Galván took part in two runner up campaigns, in Apertura 1993 and Apertura 1995. Weeks later that one, he was called by Argentina U-23 for the 1996 CONMEBOL Pre-Olympic Tournament, although Daniel Passarella chose veterans for the Olympic team defense in the final list to Atlanta.

In Brazil, he played as a defender and was often used in the sweeper position. He was known for his positioning and his ability to score goals using his head.

Among other titles, he won the Minas Gerais state with Atlético Minero. He was also in the Atlético Minero side that were runners-up in the Brazilian Championship in 1999 and with Santos in 2000 when they won the São Paulo State Championship. He played for two years at each team in Brazil. In 1998, with Atlético, he has involved in a fight at Vitória's stadium, where he was one of four players from each side sent off. He also scored an own goal at Vila Belmiro, in a 2–0 defeat against Santos' biggest rivals, Corinthians. He also played for Paysandu, in 2004.

Galván returned to Argentina in 2002 to play for Club Atlético Lanús and in 2004 he had a brief spell with Ciudad de Murcia in Spain. He has also played for Club Olimpia in Paraguay and Argentinos Juniors in Argentina.

In 2007 Galván joined Peruvian team Universitario de Deportes, in February 2009 he announced that he plans to retire in December 2010 to take up a position as a youth coach with the club.

== Honours ==
=== Club ===
Atlético Mineiro

- Campeonato Mineiro (2): 1999, 2000

Universitario de Deportes

- Torneo Apertura 2008 (1): 2008
- Primera División Peruana (1): 2009
