= Anderson Luiz (footballer, born 1974) =

Brazilian footballer

Personal information
- Full name: Ânderson Luiz Schveitzer
- Date of birth: April 5, 1974 (age 52)
- Place of birth: Florianópolis, Brazil
- Height: 1.81 m (5 ft 11 in)
- Position: Midfielder

Youth career
- Internacional

Senior career*
Years	Team	Apps	(Gls)
1992–1999	Internacional	108	(6)
2000	Santos	18	(1)
2001	Atlético Mineiro	0	(0)
2001	Internacional	4	(0)
2002	Juventude	2	(0)
2002–2005	Venezia	110	(10)
2005–2006	Brescia	7	(0)
2006	Padova	13	(1)
2006–2009	Ancona	58	(3)
2009	Potenza	6	(0)
2010	Criciúma	2	(0)
- * Club domestic league appearances and goals

Ânderson Luiz Schveitzer (sometimes spelled Schweitzer) (born 5 April 1974), simply known as Ânderson or Ânderson Luiz, is a Brazilian former professional footballer who played as a defensive midfielder most notably for Internacional and Italian Serie B and Serie C1 clubs.

In Brazil, he is sometimes referred as Ânderson Papoula (Portuguese for poppy) after he failed an anti-doping test, only to be later found out that the abnormal result had been caused by poppy seeds from a bread.

== Career ==
=== Internacional ===
Ânderson was born in Florianópolis. He started his professional career at Internacional in 1992, winning both the Campeonato Gaúcho and the Copa do Brasil, having played the first leg of the final against Fluminense as starter at the age of 18. He was remarked as having good marking and tackling skills, in contrast to poor passing.

In 1997, under manager Celso Roth, Ânderson was having the best moment for his career at Internacional and attracting interest from other Série A clubs. On 29 November 1997, after a Campeonato Brasileiro match against Santos, he tested positive for morphine after an anti-doping test, being suggested that the player used heroin and fans stating such performances throughout the championship having been enhanced by the use of drugs since, at that time, Ânderson was the best defensive midfielder at Bola de Prata (championship best eleven). Ânderson also stated that he was innocent and had not even taken any medicine that could have caused abnormal results, even though the club board suggested that the pleaded guilty by the use of medicine so that he could face a shorter ban.

Having known a story that soldiers at the Vietnam War were flagged in an anti-doping after eating poppy-made cakes, some journalists decided to take a proof and underwent the test moments after eating breads with poppy seeds, having high morphine level at the exams. The result was revealed to the club and the player, who later contacted the hotel in where they stayed for the match and found out that they had breads with poppy seeds in their menu, which had been eaten by Ânderson. The appeal from the ban was successful, but damage was already done: his performances have dropped after the scandal, leaving him out of the Bola de Prata and being surpassed by teammate Fernando; interest from Palmeiras (which would later win the 1999 Copa Libertadores) cooled down, as well as interest from a Spanish club.

=== Further career in Brazil ===
In 2000, Ânderson moved to Santos. He scored once in the Copa João Havelange against Grêmio, the main rival of his former club.

He joined Atlético Mineiro in 2001, but left before the start of 2001 Campeonato Brasileiro Série A. He played a total of 21 matches for the club, scoring once at the Campeonato Mineiro against Caldense. He later returned to Internacional until the end of the year, playing four matches at the Série A.

In 2002, he moved to Juventude was part of the squad at the 2002 Campeonato Brasileiro Série A, playing just twice before being sold to Venezia.

=== Italy ===
Ânderson joined Venezia for the 2002–03 Serie B, after the club had just been relegated finishing last at 2001–02 Serie A. He made his debut for the club on 14 September 2002 in an away match against Triestina, playing 33 matches in his first season at the club and scoring his first goal on 6 January 2003 against Bari. In the following season, Ânderson played a total of 44 league matches as Venezia escaped relegation by defeating Bari at the relegation play-offs. He went on playing further 33 matches at the 2004–05 Serie B and scoring 5 goals, before his club was relegated and dissolved due to bankruptcy.

In September 2005, Ânderson signed with Brescia, but made only seven appearances for the Serie B, all as a substitute. In January 2006, he moved to Serie C1 club Padova. He played a total of 14 league matches for the club, scoring twice.

For the 2006–07 season, Ânderson joined fellow Serie C1 club A.C. Ancona, playing 22 matches and avoiding relegation through the relegation playoffs. At the 2007–08 Serie C1, Ânderson played 27 games as his club finished second at Serie C1/B and achieved promotion to the 2008–09 Serie B by winning the promotion playoffs. However, he barely played in the following season, making his season debut on 6 December 2008 and playing only 7 Serie B matches, including the victory against Rimini at the relegation playoffs.

Ânderson return to the third tier for the 2009–10 season, joining Potenza. Having played only six league matches, he asked to be released from his contract stating his desire to return to Brazil.

=== Criciúma ===
On 13 January 2010, Ânderson returned to his home country, signing for Criciúma. He played three Campeonato Catarinense matches for the club, before retiring from professional football in the same year.

== Honours ==
Internacional

- Campeonato Gaúcho: 1992, 1994, 1997
- Copa do Brasil: 1992
