= Pereira (footballer, born 1979) =

Brazilian footballer

Personal information
- Full name: Fábio Pereira da Cruz
- Date of birth: 30 July 1979 (age 47)
- Place of birth: Guarulhos, Brazil
- Height: 1.89 m (6 ft 2 in)
- Position: Centre back

Youth career
- 1999–2000: Santos

Senior career*
| Years | Team | Apps | (Gls) |
| 2001–2005 | Santos | 53 | (1) |
| 2002 | → Gaziantepspor (loan) | 12 | (0) |
| 2004 | → Vasco da Gama (loan) | 2 | (0) |
| 2005 | → Portuguesa (loan) | 3 | (1) |
| 2005–2008 | Grêmio | 87 | (8) |
| 2009–2013 | Coritiba | 133 | (19) |
| 2013–2014 | Sport Recife | 17 | (0) |
| 2015–2016 | Juventude | 22 | (1) |
- * Club domestic league appearances and goals

Fábio Pereira da Cruz (born 30 July 1979), commonly known as Pereira, is a Brazilian retired footballer who played as a central defender.

In January 2002 he left on loan to Turkish club Gaziantepspor.

== Honours ==
Santos

- Campeonato Brasileiro Série A: 2002

Grêmio

- Campeonato Brasileiro Série B: 2005
- Campeonato Gaúcho: 2006, 2007

Coritiba

- Campeonato Paranaense: 2010, 2011, 2012, 2013
- Campeonato Brasileiro Série B: 2010
