= Marcelo Silva (footballer, born 1976) =

Brazilian footballer

Personal information
- Full name: Marcelo José da Silva
- Date of birth: 25 May 1976 (age 50)
- Place of birth: São Paulo, Brazil
- Height: 1.82 m (6 ft 0 in)
- Position: Defensive midfielder

Senior career*
Years	Team	Apps	(Gls)
1995–1998	Juventus-SP	?	(?)
1998–2002	Santos	23	(1)
2002–2004	Spartak Moscow	2	(0)
2003	→ Bahia (loan)	0	(0)
2003	→ Atlético Mineiro (loan)	33	(2)
2005	Goiás	9	(0)
2006–2007	Atlético Paranaense	19	(2)
2007	Náutico	0	(0)
2008	Vitória	0	(0)
2008	Bragantino	?	(?)
2009	Juventus-SP	0	(0)
- * Club domestic league appearances and goals

Marcelo José da Silva (born 25 May 1976) is a former Brazilian footballer.

== Biography ==
In July 2002, he left for Spartak Moscow. He played 3 times for Spartak at 2002–03 UEFA Champions League, all at group stage and as substitute. In January 2003, he left for Bahia on loan.

In summer 2004, he trailed at Italian Serie B side Perugia but the club could not sign non-EU footballers from abroad, which Silva's EU nationality had to wait for 4 months, made the deal collapsed and the Italian club went bankrupt in summer 2005.

In February 2005, he returned to Brazil for Goiás, signed a 1-year contract. He then left for Atlético Paranaense in May 2006.

On 1 September 2007, he left for Náutico, signed a contract until the end of 2007 Campeonato Brasileiro. On 1 January 2008, he signed a 1-year contract with Vitória but on 1 September 2008 left for Bragantino.

In June 2009, Silva returned to Juventus for São Paulo State Cup. He then retired from football.

== Honours ==
- Campeonato Brasileiro Série C: 1997
- Copa CONMEBOL: 1998
- Russian Cup: 2002–03
