= Jorginho (footballer, born February 1975) =

Brazilian footballer

Personal information
- Full name: Jorge Marcelo de Araújo
- Date of birth: 10 February 1975 (age 51)
- Place of birth: Rio de Janeiro, Brazil
- Height: 1.83 m (6 ft 0 in)
- Position: Defensive midfielder

Youth career
- –1995: Olaria

Senior career*
Years	Team	Apps	(Gls)
1996–1997	Olaria		
1997–2003	Flamengo	242	(4)
2003–2005	Brasiliense		
2005–2006	Penafiel		
2007	Nova Iguaçu		
2008	Campo Grande-RJ		
2009	Moto Club		
2009	Juventus-SP		
2013	America-RJ		
- * Club domestic league appearances and goals as of 13 March 2024

Jorge Marcelo de Araújo (born 10 February 1975), better known as Jorginho, is a Brazilian former professional footballer who played as a midfielder.

== Career ==
A player with great defensive power, Jorginho stood out at Flamengo for his ability to nullify opposing central midfielders. He made 242 appearances and scored 4 goals for the club he, winning several titles. In 2004, he was also champion with Brasiliense. He ended his career, but returned in 2013 to defend America.

== Honours ==
Flamengo

- Copa dos Campeões Mundiais: 1997
- Copa Mercosur: 1999
- Copa dos Campeões: 2001
- Campeonato Carioca: 1999, 2000, 2001
- Taça Guanabara: 1999, 2001
- Taça Rio: 2000

Brasiliense

- Campeonato Brasileiro Série B: 2004
- Campeonato Brasiliense: 2004
