= Júlio César (football goalkeeper, born 1979) =

Brazilian footballer

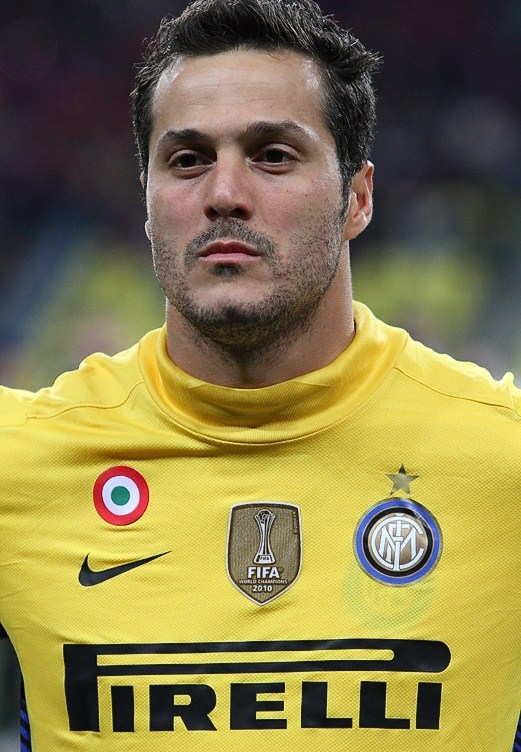
- Júlio César with Inter Milan in 2011

Personal information
- Full name: Júlio César Soares de Espíndola
- Date of birth: 3 September 1979 (age 47)
- Place of birth: Duque de Caxias, Rio de Janeiro, Brazil
- Height: 1.87 m (6 ft 2 in)
- Position: Goalkeeper

Youth career
- 1991–1997: Flamengo

Senior career*
Years	Team	Apps	(Gls)
1997–2005	Flamengo	135	(0)
2005	Chievo	0	(0)
2005–2012	Inter Milan	228	(0)
2012–2014	Queens Park Rangers	24	(0)
2014	→ Toronto FC (loan)	7	(0)
2014–2017	Benfica	57	(0)
2018	Flamengo	1	(0)
Total		452	(0)

International career
1995	Brazil U17	7	(0)
2004–2014	Brazil	87	(0)
Medal record
Men's football
Representing Brazil
FIFA Confederations Cup
Winner	2009 South Africa
Winner	2013 Brazil
Copa América
Winner	2004 Peru
South American Youth Football Championship
Third place	1999 Argentina
FIFA U-17 World Cup
Runner-up	1995 Ecuador
- * Club domestic league appearances and goals

Júlio César Soares de Espíndola (born 3 September 1979), known as Júlio César (Portuguese pronunciation: [ˈʒulju ˈsɛzaʁ]), is a Brazilian former professional footballer who played as a goalkeeper.

Júlio César spent seven years at Italian club Inter Milan, with whom he won five Scudetti, the 2009–10 UEFA Champions League, and the 2010 FIFA Club World Cup. He was awarded the Serie A Goalkeeper of the Year title in both 2009 and 2010, and was nominated for the 2009 Ballon d'Or, where he was voted into 21st place. He was also named UEFA Club Goalkeeper of the Year after the 2009–10 season and won the Golden Glove award at the 2013 Confederations Cup.

César won 87 international caps for Brazil. He was selected for the 2006, 2010 and 2014 FIFA World Cups, and two Copa América tournaments.

== Club career ==
=== Flamengo and Chievo ===
Júlio César began his professional career with Clube de Regatas do Flamengo in 1997. He made his debut that year on 17 May in a match versus Fluminense where he saved a penalty kick, which proved to be insufficient as the team lost 2–0. From 1997 to 2000, he served as Clemer's understudy, only taking his spot during the Copa João Havelange, showing good skills in goal.

Júlio César's performances in goal also earned him his first call-up to the Brazil senior squad in 2002, also helping Flamengo to escape relegation in several times in 2001, 2002 and 2004. His best match for the team was the second match of 2001 Campeonato Carioca final against Vasco da Gama, making several great saves. Following the match, while still on the dressing room, he interrupted a live interview of Beto to make a provocation to Vasco da Gama president Eurico Miranda, who, according to him, had already reserved the party at Basque.

In 2003, Júlio César became embroiled in a controversy during the loss to Fluminense. With Flamengo already trailing 4–0, César, after making a save, dropped the ball on the ground and begun playing with the feet, dribbling several players until the ball was taken by Zé Carlos. This attitude was heavily criticized by then coach of the team, Evaristo de Macedo, who called him an "idiot". According to César, he did this because he was desperate and was feeling helpless, stating: "Fluminense was giving us the runaround and I wanted to help my teammates, who were going through a difficult situation. I overdid it because I was sad and hurt, but I already apologized on Saturday."

He left the club at the beginning of 2005, having made 285 appearances for the club in all competitions. He was the third goalkeeper with most appearances for the club, behind only Cantarele (557) and Zé Carlos (352).

In January 2005, he moved to Italian Serie A club Chievo. Due to Serie A regulations that impose a cap on the number of non-EU players clubs can sign from abroad, Júlio César could not join Inter Milan at the time and was initially registered to Chievo through a deal between the two clubs.

=== Inter Milan ===
In July 2005, following a deal between Chievo and Inter, Júlio César officially signed a three-year contract with Inter. The deal cost Inter €2.45 million.

==== 2005–06: Debut season ====
Júlio César was given squad number 12, and made his official debut on 10 August in the first leg of 2005–06 UEFA Champions League third qualifying round versus Shakhtar Donetsk, keeping a clean-sheet in the 2–0 win at RSC Olimpiyskiy. His first title with the club came to him when he was benched at the Supercoppa Italiana against Juventus. César made his Serie A debut on 28 August in the season opener against Treviso, making a good overall performance and keeping a clean-sheet as the match was won 3–0. On 24 November, during a Champions League group stage match against Petržalka, Júlio César played in a line-up of 11 foreign players on the pitch; Luís Figo was the only european.

Júlio César finished his first season with Nerazzurri by making 40 appearances in all competitions, as Inter won the championship following the relegation of Juventus due to match-fixing, and also conquered Coppa Italia by defeating Roma 4–2 on aggregate, with César playing on both finals. Inter thus completed the domestic treble. His performances were noted during his first season, as he was distinguished for saving penalties and making great saves, which made Francesco Toldo lose his place as starting keeper after four seasons.

==== 2006–09: Domestic success ====
The 2006–07 season was even more successful for Júlio César and Inter, as the player and the team set several records in the league. He played 32 matches as the championship ended in conquest, with Inter winning it for the 15th time in history. He kept 12 clean-sheets and conceded 30 goals, with Inter losing only once; they won the title with 5 games to spare, and collected 97 points and setting a record for most consecutive matches without defeat, 31.

Júlio César begun 2007–08 season by receiving a red card, his first in Inter colours, in a 1–1 draw versus Udinese in the opening week of championship. He kept three clean-sheets in the Champions League group stage to help Inter finish top of Group G. He finished the season by winning another championship, contributing with a clean-sheet in the decisive last match against Parma. By keeping 17 clean-sheets in 35 Serie A matches, Júlio César set a personal record in terms of clean sheets, with a 53 percent average. In the Champions League, he made 8 appearances, but the team was eliminated in the round of 16 by Liverpool.

Júlio César commenced his 4th Inter season on 24 August 2008 by playing in the Supercoppa Italiana match against Roma; the regular and extra-time ended in a 2–2 draw. In the penalty shoot-out, he stopped the attempt of his Brazil teammate Juan which paved Inter's way to victory as the Nerazzurri won 8–7. One month later, he made his 100th Serie A appearance as Inter won 1–0 versus Lecce in the 2008–09 Serie A week 4. Inter finished the championship again in the first place with 84 points, 10 more than the second place Juventus, with Júlio César contributing with 17 clean-sheets in 36 matches, equaling his personal best set the previous season.

In July 2009, Júlio César was chosen by ESPN Brasil as the best player of the 2008–09 season. He also received the Prêmio Futebol no Mundo (Football in the World Award), designated to the best Brazilian footballer playing outside Brazil in that season.

==== 2009–10: Treble-winning campaign ====
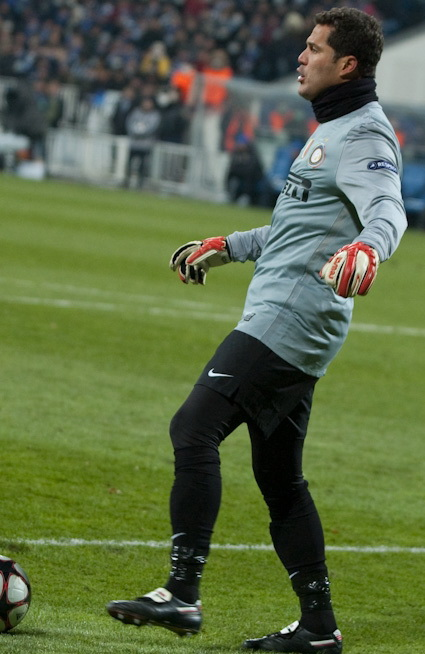
Júlio César in action with Inter Milan

Júlio César was one of the main protagonists during the 2009–10 season, where he played 54 matches in all competitions. In November 2009, he signed a contract with Inter which would last until 2014, adding two more years to his contract. On 1 December, Júlio César finished 21st in the 2009 Ballon d'Or ranking. Later on 24 January 2010, in the Derby della Madonnina versus Milan, he kept his goal intact by saving a penalty of his international teammate Ronaldinho as Inter won 2–0 with 9 players to increase their league lead. Júlio César then was involved in a car accident just two days before the first leg of 2009–10 UEFA Champions League round of 16 against Chelsea which left him bruised and nursing lacerations to his face. He was, however, able to start the game and despite conceding in the second half made a decent overall performance as Inter won the first leg 2–1. Júlio César was vital also in team's Coppa Italia campaign where he kept two clean-sheets in the semi-final tie against Fiorentina which sent Inter to the final 2–0 on aggregate. He also was on top of his game in the semi-final tie of Champions League versus Barcelona, saving several shots, including one in the second leg against Lionel Messi that was dubbed as "career defining" by Júlio César himself. Inter won 3–2 on aggregate to reach the final for the first time since 1972. He won his first trophy of the season on 5 May by making an excellent performance against Roma as Inter won 1–0 to claim the Coppa Italia trophy. Eleven days later, Júlio César won his fifth consecutive Scudetto as Inter won at Siena to finish the championship two points ahead of Roma. On 22 May in the Champions League final against Bayern Munich, he made another splendid performance, making vital saves against Thomas Müller and Arjen Robben as Inter won 2–0 thanks to the brace of Diego Milito, winning their first European title in 45 years. By winning Serie A, Coppa Italia and UEFA Champions League, Inter became the first Italian club to win the treble. His performances in league, where he was ever-present and kept 17 clean-sheets earned him Serie A Goalkeeper of the Year award for the second consecutive year, also becoming only the third goalkeeper to win it more than once. For his performances in the Champions League, he won the award UEFA Club Goalkeeper of the Year. His impressive form for Inter earned him praise from former Inter and Italy goalkeeper Gianluca Pagliuca, who stated his belief that Júlio César was the best goalkeeper in the world.

==== 2010–11: FIFA Club World Cup champion ====
Ahead of the new season, César changed his squad number from 12 to 1, which was vacated by the retired Francesco Toldo. His old squad number became part of newcomer Luca Castellazzi. On 21 August 2010, he won his 4th Supercoppa Italiana trophy; Inter faced Roma in a 3–1 comeback win at San Siro. In November 2010, the medical staff discovered a torn thigh injury at Júlio César and put his presence at FIFA Club World Cup in doubt. He was recovered in time and was called for the tournament, keeping a clean-sheet in the semi-final match against Seongnam Ilhwa Chunma. He kept his goal intact in the final as well which helped the team to win the trophy for the first time after defeating TP Mazembe 3–0. Inter thus completed the Quintuple to become the fourth team in the world after Liverpool in 2001, Al-Ahly in 2006 and Barcelona in 2009. Júlio César ended 2010 by being named second best goalkeeper of 2010 by IFFHS, only behind Iker Casillas. He was also named Inter Player of the Year for 2010 for his outstanding appearances throughout the year, receiving Pirata d'Oro Award. He finished 19th in the 2010 FIFA Ballon d'Or ranking, winning two places compare to last year ranking.

His torn thigh injury reappeared at the beginning of 2011 which kept him sidelined for 28 days, missing eight matches in the process. He returned on action on 30 January in the league match against Palermo and despite conceding twice in the first half, contributed by saving a Javier Pastore penalty and his rebound as well as Inter bounced back to win 3–2. In February, Júlio César made a poor performance in the first leg of 2010–11 UEFA Champions League round of 16 against Bayern Munich, as his weak save against Arjen Robben turned into a rebound for Mario Gómez who scored for a 1–0 win at San Siro. He repeated the howler in the second leg as well, making another poor save against Robben only for Gómez to score again. However, he was decisive in a one-on-one save against Franck Ribéry and another one against Gómez; Inter eventually overturned the game and won 3–2, meaning they progressed on the away goal rule. In the Coppa Italia, he played in both legs of semi-final tie against Roma, keeping a clean-sheet in the first one as Inter reached the final for the second consecutive season, where they defeating Palermo to win the third trophy of the season. Júlio César finished 2010–11 campaign by making 39 appearances in all competitions, including 25 in league, where Inter failed to win the title for the first time after five seasons. In the Champions League, where Júlio César played seven matches, the team lost the crown after being eliminated by Schalke 04 in the quarter-finals.

==== 2011–12: 300th match and farewell ====
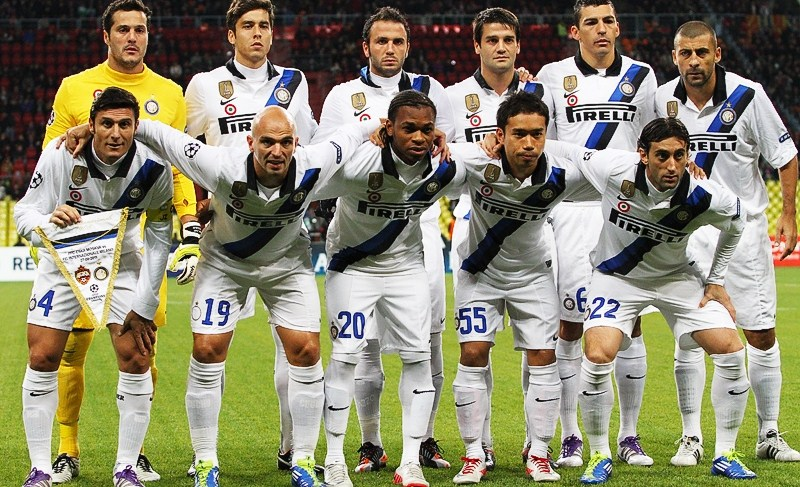
Júlio César (yellow shirt) and his teammates before a Champions League match against PFC CSKA Moscow on 27 September 2011

In 2011–12 season, Júlio César played his 200th Serie A match on 1 October 2011 in the 3–0 home loss to Napoli, saving a penalty kick in the first half. Later on 22 November, Júlio César made his 50th UEFA Champions League appearance in the 1–1 draw against Trabzonspor in the 2011–12 UEFA Champions League Group B matchday 4. This draw was enough for Inter to secure a spot in the round of 16. He reached a century of clean sheets in Serie A on 18 March 2012 by playing in the goalless draw against Atalanta in the matchday 28. This draw meant that Inter have won only one of their last nine league matches. Júlio César's 300th appearance in all competitions for Inter occurred on 6 May in the penultimate week of Serie A against Milan in which Inter won 4–2. He conceded a controversial penalty to Kevin-Prince Boateng and was included in a verbal confrontation with Zlatan Ibrahimović who went on to convert the penalty. He was booked for the penalty which made him miss the final match of the season against Lazio. He concluded his 7th season at Inter by amassing 40 appearances in all competitions as Inter finished sixth in league, with the team just five goals short of equalling their all-time worst concession in a single Serie A campaign. In the Champions League, the team was eliminated in the round of 16 by Marseille on away goal rule and was knocked out of Coppa Italia by Napoli. With some critics believing Júlio César had declined in form since the 2009–10 season, Inter signed Slovenian goalkeeper Samir Handanović from Udinese to take over as first-choice goalkeeper.

On 31 July 2012, Júlio César stated his intention to leave Inter, saying, "They have been seven beautiful and successful years, but, in a few days, my adventure with the Inter shirt will end. I would like to thank all of you fans for the support you have given me and I hope you have a lot more success to enjoy." He explained that the decision came after Inter suggested to reduce his salary, which Júlio César refused by stating: "no player in my situation would have done that". He gave his farewell before the match against Vaslui, entering on the field accompanied by his children to greet the fans with an open letter written by himself.

=== Queens Park Rangers ===
On 29 August 2012, Júlio César confirmed that he had signed for English Premier League club Queens Park Rangers on a four-year contract. He became the fourth Champions League winner in the QPR squad, along with Djibril Cissé (2005), Park Ji-sung (2008) and José Bosingwa (2004 and 2012).

Júlio César made his Premier League debut on 15 September 2012 in the home match versus Chelsea, making an excellent performance by keeping a clean-sheet as the match ended in a goalless draw. He managed to play 26 games in his debut season, including 24 in league, keeping 6 clean-sheets as QPR was relegated to EFL Championship after only two seasons.

Following QPR's relegation from the Premier League at the end of his debut campaign, Júlio César was frozen out of the team. Despite this, he did not leave the club before the summer transfer window closed. On 4 January 2014, Júlio César started his first game for Rangers against Everton in the third round of the FA Cup, which QPR lost 4–0.

==== Toronto FC loan ====
On 7 February 2014, Júlio César confirmed that he had signed a loan for Major League Soccer (MLS) club Toronto FC. The move was made to get some match action for him, prior to representing Brazil in the 2014 FIFA World Cup, as he had been replaced by Robert Green as QPR's first choice goalkeeper. César made his debut with Toronto in their season opener at Seattle Sounders FC on 15 March, which ended in a 2–1 away victory with both goals coming from newly acquired Jermain Defoe. During week seven of the season, he was awarded MLS Save of the Week against David Texeira of FC Dallas. He was recalled from loan and returned to QPR on 25 July 2014.

==== Departure ====
On 19 August 2014, the club announced via a statement that they have terminated the contract with Júlio César by mutual consent. He stated that he didn't play in his second season at Rangers due to "contractual problems". He added: "I’d have to go to the park by myself. I even bought some goalkeeper gloves because I didn’t want my team to know about it."

=== Benfica ===
On 19 August 2014, Júlio César signed a two-year deal with Portuguese champions Benfica. He debuted for the team in a 3–1 Primeira Liga home win against Moreirense on 21 September. On 26 January 2015, he set the fourth-best record ever at Benfica without conceding a goal in the Portuguese league, at 808 minutes. Then, on 9 May, he set a personal record in terms of clean sheets, with a 59 percent average (16 clean sheets in 27 matches), surpassing his 53 percent record with Inter. Later in early July, he was awarded Best Goalkeeper in Primeira Liga. On 25 May 2016, he renewed his contract with Benfica until 2018. However, his contract was terminated by mutual consent on 28 November 2017. During his spell at the Lisbon side, he won six trophies, including three league titles.

=== Return to Flamengo ===
"I asked to stay here at Flamengo until the end of the season because you're here, to learn something from you."

— Vinícius Júnior to Júlio César, 2018

On 29 January 2018, Flamengo announced the return of Júlio César to the club, 13 years after originally leaving for Europe. Júlio César rejoined the club to make his farewell, signing a three-month contract. The contract will earn him a symbolic fee of 15,000 Brazilian real. He took squad number 12 which was previously retired in honour of the fans.

Júlio César played his first match for Flamengo in 13 years on 8 March, starting and wearing the captain armband in a 3–0 away win over Boavista in 2018 Campeonato Carioca.

Júlio César played in the 2–0 win over América Mineiro on 22 April in what was his final match as a professional footballer. He delivered a great performance, making five saves. Before the match, Júlio César stated:

I think I cried a lot during the week, with the material I participated with my family, relatives and friends. It was a whirlwind of emotions. For today I had prepared myself well. Besides the farewell, it was worth three points. Positive result brings 'n' things, quiet to work. This group deserves, is very good and will make a great year.

== International career ==
=== 1995–99: Youth career ===
Júlio César was the starting keeper of Brazil under-17 squad in the 1995 FIFA U-17 World Championship in Ecuador. He kept clean-sheets in all three Group C matches, respectively against Germany, Oman and Canada, helping Brazil finish on top. Brazil made their way to the final, also defeating their rivals Argentina in the semi-final, only to lose 3–2 to Ghana.

Four years later, Júlio César was part of Brazil under-20 side in their 1999 FIFA World Youth Championship campaign. He was the second choice behind Fábio, making no appearances as Brazil was eliminated in the quarter-finals by Uruguay.

=== 2003–04: Debut and Copa América triumph ===
Júlio César was first included in Brazil senior team for the 2003 FIFA Confederations Cup, where he did not play as the team was eliminated in the group stage. The next year, he was included in the squad for the 2004 Copa América, where he also made his first international appearance, starting in the opening Group C against Chile, keeping a clean-sheet as Seleção won 1–0. He became the 963rd player to play at least a match for Brazil. He was the starting keeper during the tournament, leading the team to the final versus Argentina. In the final, the regular time ended in a 2–2 draw which lead the match to penalty shootouts where Júlio César saved the first penalty executed by Andrés D'Alessandro in a 4–2 win. This win constituted his first international trophy and Brazil's 7th title.

=== 2005–07: Years as backup and 2006 FIFA World Cup ===
Júlio César spend the majority of 2006 FIFA World Cup qualification campaign on bench as Dida's understudy, making only two appearances in both matches against Bolivia. He was included in the manager Carlos Alberto Parreira's list for the final tournament, taking squad number 22 as the third keeper. He didn't play in the tournament as Brazil was eliminated in the quarter-final by France.

After the World Cup and the international retirement of Dida, the competition to become Brazil's new first-choice goalkeeper began. He initially was out of favor, as new coach Dunga preferred Gomes, Helton and Doni ahead of him. However, he forced his way into the team and finally, he replaced Doni as first-choice goalkeeper in September 2007. Until that period, he had only 14 international caps to his name.

=== 2008–10: Confederations Cup glory and World Cup ===
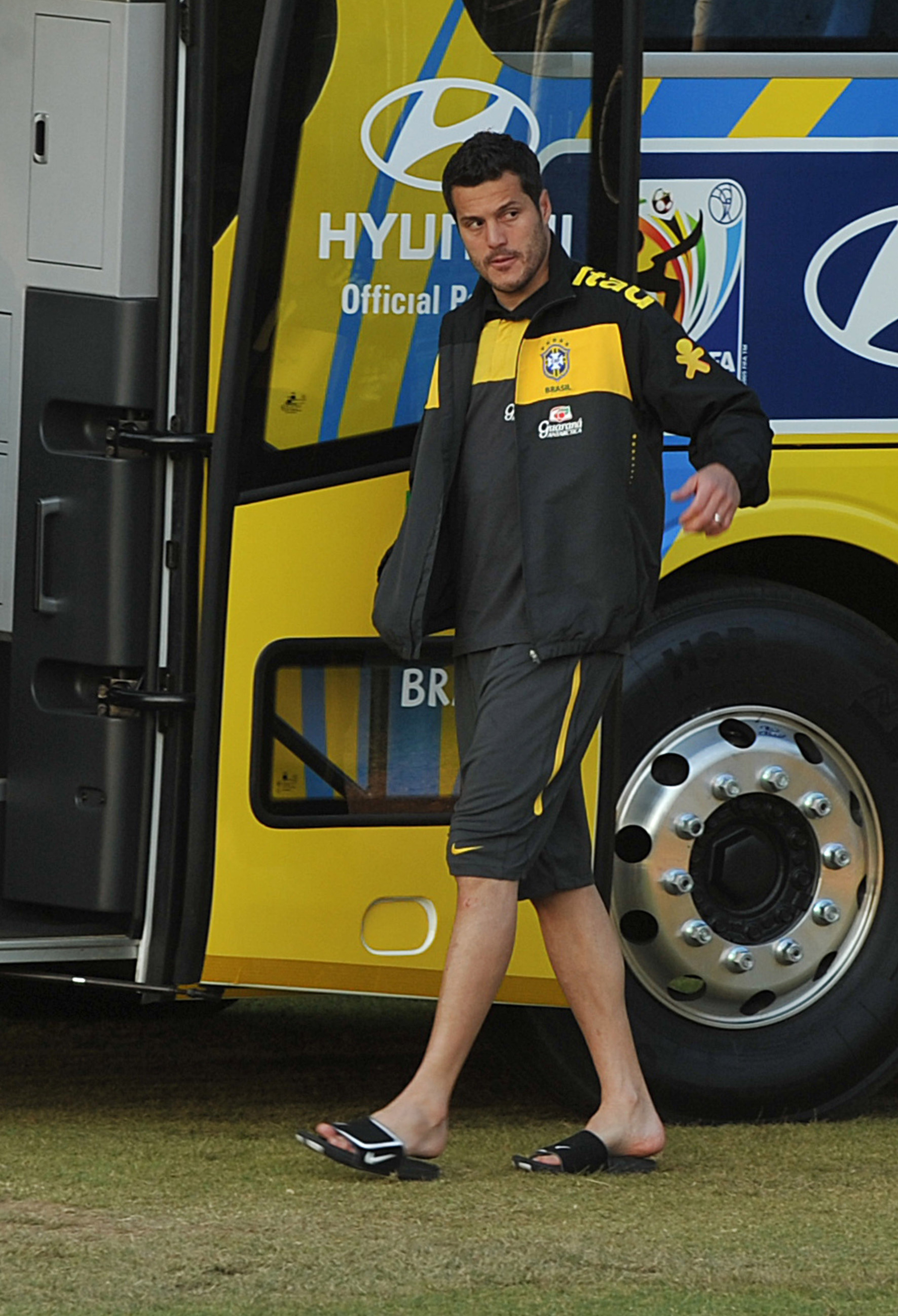
Júlio César with Brazil at the 2010 FIFA World Cup

Júlio César begun his 2010 FIFA World Cup qualification campaign by keeping two clean-sheets in the opening two matches against Colombia, a goalless draw, and Ecuador, a 5–0 win. He was ever-presented during the qualifying campaign, making 18 appearances, keeping 10 clean-sheets and conceding only 11 goals, being the goalkeeper with most clean-sheets achieved and less goals conceded as Brazil clinched the first place and secured a spot to 2010 FIFA World Cup. During the qualifying campaign Júlio César also set a Brazil record by keeping his goal intact for 581 minutes, starting the streak in the match against Paraguay and finishing it in the last regular minute of the match against Ecuador. This made him the Brazil keeper with most minutes without conceding, breaking the previous record of 491 minutes set by Claudio Taffarel.

In June 2009, Júlio César was named in the Brazil squad by manager Dunga for the 2009 FIFA Confederations Cup. He played his first match in the tournament on 15 June 2009 in Brazil's 4–3 defeat of Egypt. His performance was rated as positive whatsoever. Júlio César, however, kept clean-sheets in the remaining two matches of Group B as Brazil finished on top with full points. Brazil defeated South Africa in the semi-final, with Júlio César giving a Man of the Match performance. In the final on 28 June against the United States, Júlio César won his second international trophy after Brazil won 3–2 despite conceding twice in the first half. Individually, he was the keeper with most clean-sheets in the tournament, 3 in 5 matches.

In the 2010 FIFA World Cup, Brazil was shorted in Group G. He joined the team in May 2010 and also played in a friendly against Zimbabwe which was won 3–0. He was included in the final list by manager Dunga along with Inter teammates Lúcio and Maicon whom he won the Treble with. Júlio César played his first FIFA World Cup match on 15 June in the opening match of Group G, a 2–1 win over North Korea. He made his 50th international appearance in the second group match, a 3–1 win against Ivory Coast. He kept his first FIFA World Cup clean-sheet in the last group match against Portugal which ended 0–0. The result sent them to the knockout stage as Group G winners. Júlio César was at fault in the quarter-final match versus Netherlands as his flap at a Wesley Sneijder cross led to the goal that saw the Dutch draw level; Brazil lost 2–1 and were eliminated. Following the elimination, speaking about the first Netherlands goal, he told that "he had doubts on how to go to the ball with Melo." He finished his World Cup campaign by keeping two clean-sheets in 5 matches.

=== 2011–12: Copa América and decline ===
On 8 June 2011, Júlio César was called by manager Mano Menezes for the 2011 Copa América, which was his 6th international tournament. He made his first Copa América appearance on 3 July by keeping a clean-sheet in the 0–0 draw against Venezuela. Seleção finished Group B on first place with 5 points. In the quarter-final match against Paraguay, Júlio César kept his goal intact in the regular and extra-time before the match went to penalty shoot-out, where Brazil was eliminated 0–2 after missing all of their attempts.

After Copa América had ended, Júlio César continued to be part of the team; he was in goal in the first friendly of 2012 against Bosnia and Herzegovina. His poor attempt to save a shot from Vedad Ibišević resulted in Bosnia's only goal as the match was won by Brazil. This howler resulted in him being dropped by manager Mano Menezes for the rest of 2012.

=== 2013–14: Confederations Cup champion and final World Cup ===
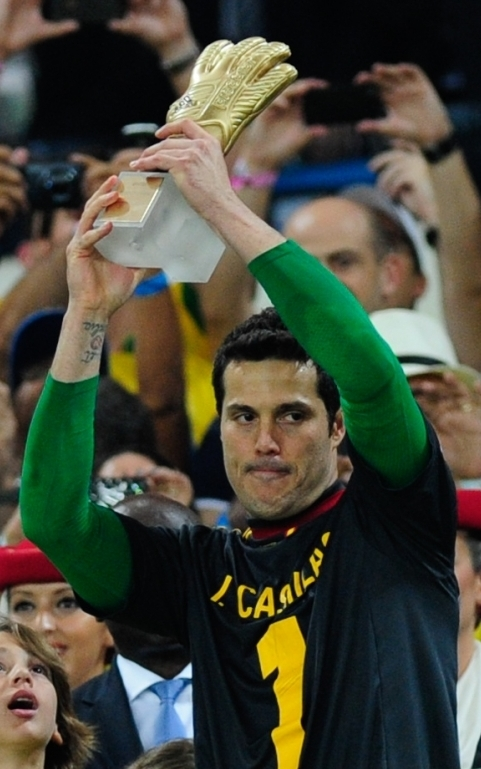
Júlio César lifting the Golden Glove award while wearing Iker Casillas' shirt as a token of respect

The returned Luiz Felipe Scolari included Júlio César in the 23 players list for the friendly against England on 6 February 2013. Speaking of his return to the national team after almost a year, Júlio César commented: "I never gave up on playing for Brazil." He made his first international appearance after 12 months by starting in the match, conceding in each half as Brazil lost 2–1 at Wembley Stadium. This win was also England's first over "Verde-Amarela" in 23 years.

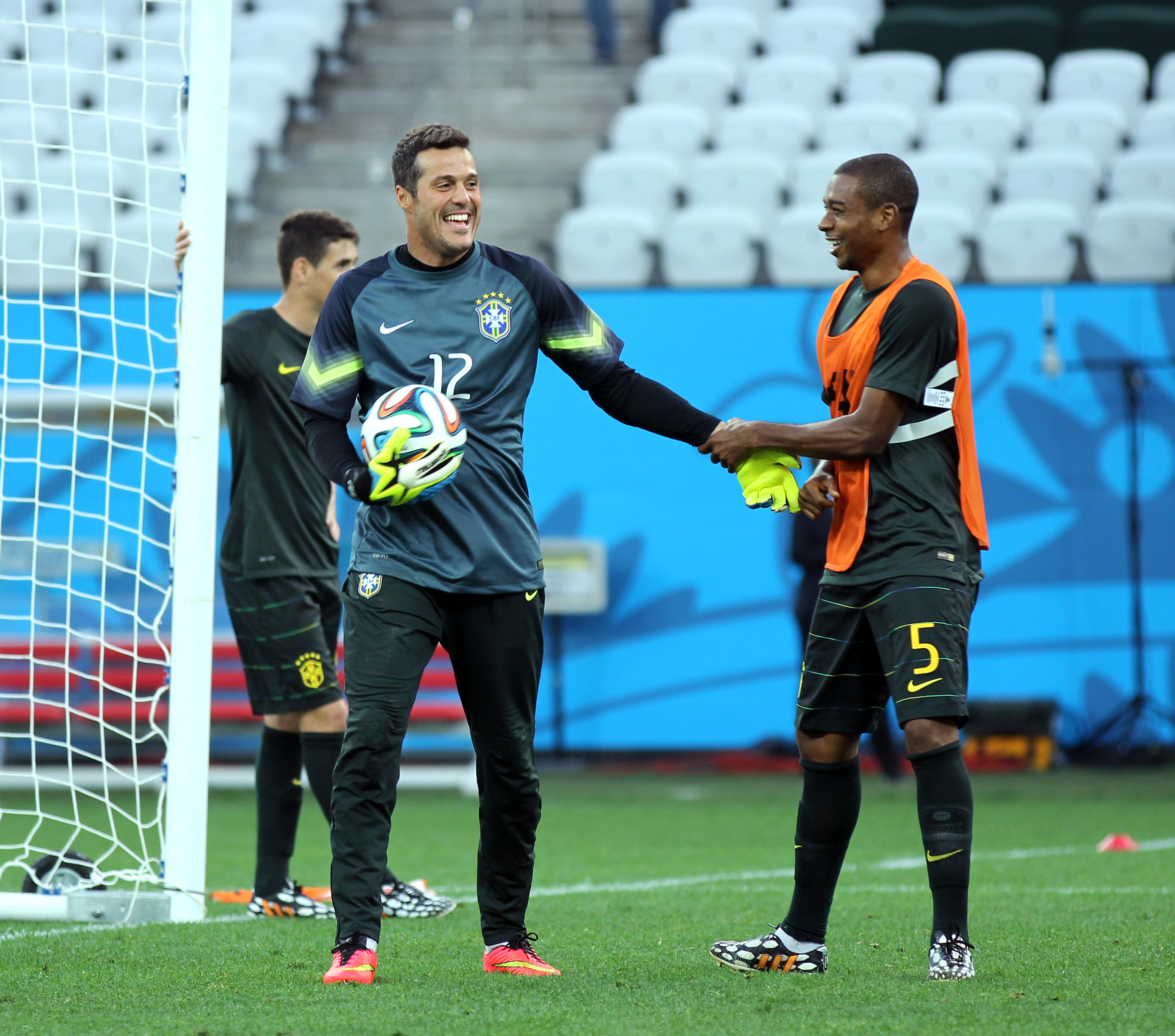
Júlio César (left) and Fernandinho (right) training for Brazil at 2014 FIFA World Cup

Júlio César was part of the 23 players called by coach Luiz Felipe Scolari to play in the 2013 FIFA Confederations Cup on home soil. He played three matches in Group A and kept two clean sheets; the first in the opening match against Japan (3–0) and the second against Mexico (2–0). In the semifinal against Uruguay, Júlio César saved a penalty kick taken by Diego Forlán in the 14th minute. Brazil went to win the match by 2–1, and Júlio César was named man of the match. He kept his goal intact in the final as well against Spain as Brazil won 3–0 to claim their 4th title. For his performances he was given Golden Glove award as the best goalkeeper of the tournament; he was also part of the FIFA.com Users' Dream Team. Júlio César received the award while wearing the shirt of Iker Casillas, to make "a tribute for everything he did".

On 2 June 2014, Júlio César was named in Brazil's squad for the 2014 World Cup on home soil once again. In the team's round of 16 match, Júlio César saved from Mauricio Pinilla and Alexis Sánchez in the penalty shootout against Chile, sending Brazil through to a quarter-final against Colombia. His efforts earned him the Man of the Match award. However, he conceded seven goals against Germany in the semi-final that the Germans won 7–1, and after Brazil lost 3–0 to the Netherlands in the third-place play-off match, Júlio César retired from the national team.

== Style of play ==
Considered one of Brazil's best goalkeepers, as well as one of the best goalkeepers of his generation, Júlio César was a well-rounded, commanding player, who was known for his athleticism, strength, and quick reflexes, as well as his agility, positional sense, shot-stopping, ability to read the game, and speed when rushing off his line; he also stood out for his ability to collect crosses and command his box effectively, despite his relatively average stature for a goalkeeper, standing at 1.87 m (6 ft 1 1/2 in). A left-footed goalkeeper, he was also known for his ball skills and distribution, as well as for his penalty stopping abilities.

== Personal life ==
Júlio César is a Roman Catholic. He married Brazilian model and actress Susana Werner at the Candelária Church. Together, they have two children. He is sponsored by Asics.

== Career statistics ==
=== Club ===
Appearances and goals by club, season and competition
Club	Season	League			Cup		Continental		Other		Total	
Club	Season	Division	Apps	Goals	Apps	Goals	Apps	Goals	Apps	Goals	Apps	Goals
Flamengo	1997	Série A	0	0	1	0	—		—		1	0
Flamengo	1998	Série A	1	0	0	0	—		—		1	0
Flamengo	1999	Série A	0	0	0	0	—		—		0	0
Flamengo	2000	Série A	16	0	1	0	—		—		17	0
Flamengo	2001	Série A	26	0	6	0	—		—		32	0
Flamengo	2002	Série A	16	0	9	0	5 (Note: All appearances in Copa Libertadores)	0	—		30	0
Flamengo	2003	Série A	43	0	11	0	—		—		54	0
Flamengo	2004	Série A	33	0	0	0	2 (Note: All appearances in Copa Sudamericana)	0	—		35	0
Flamengo	Total		135	0	28	0	7	0	—		170	0
Chievo	2004–05	Serie A	0	0	0	0	—		—		0	0
Inter Milan	2005–06	Serie A	29	0	4	0	7 (Note: All appearances in UEFA Champions League)	0	0	0	40	0
Inter Milan	2006–07	Serie A	32	0	0	0	6	0	0	0	38	0
Inter Milan	2007–08	Serie A	35	0	0	0	8	0	1 (Note: Appearance in Supercoppa Italiana)	0	44	0
Inter Milan	2008–09	Serie A	36	0	1	0	7	0	1	0	45	0
Inter Milan	2009–10	Serie A	38	0	2	0	13	0	1	0	54	0
Inter Milan	2010–11	Serie A	25	0	3	0	7	0	4 (Note: One appearance in Supercoppa Italiana, one appearance in UEFA Super Cup, two appearances in FIFA Club World Cup)	0	39	0
Inter Milan	2011–12	Serie A	33	0	0	0	6	0	1	0	40	0
Inter Milan	Total		228	0	10	0	54	0	8	0	300	0
Queens Park Rangers	2012–13	Premier League	24	0	2 (Note: One appearance in FA Cup, one appearance in Football League Cup)	0	—		—		26	0
Queens Park Rangers	2013–14	Championship	0	0	1 (Note: Appearance in FA Cup)	0	—		—		1	0
Queens Park Rangers	Total		24	0	3	0	—		—		27	0
Toronto FC (loan)	2014	Major League Soccer	7	0	0	0	—		—		7	0
Benfica	2014–15	Primeira Liga	23	0	4 (Note: Two appearances in Taça de Portugal, two appearances in Taça da Liga)	0	3	0	—		30	0
Benfica	2015–16	Primeira Liga	24	0	2 (Note: All appearances in Taça de Portugal)	0	7	0	1 (Note: Appearance in Supertaça Cândido de Oliveira)	0	34	0
Benfica	2016–17	Primeira Liga	8	0	3 (Note: Two appearances in Taça de Portugal, one appearance in Taça da Liga)	0	1	0	1	0	12	0
Benfica	2017–18	Primeira Liga	2	0	1 (Note: Appearance in Taça da Liga)	0	1	0	0	0	4	0
Benfica	Total		57	0	10	0	12	0	2	0	81	0
Flamengo	2018	Série A	1	0	0	0	—		1 (Note: Appearance in Campeonato Carioca)	0	2	0
Career total			452	0	51	0	73	0	11	0	586	0

=== International ===
Appearances and goals by national team and year
National team	Year	Apps	Goals
Brazil	2004	9	0
Brazil	2005	2	0
Brazil	2006	0	0
Brazil	2007	8	0
Brazil	2008	10	0
Brazil	2009	17	0
Brazil	2010	7	0
Brazil	2011	10	0
Brazil	2012	1	0
Brazil	2013	13	0
Brazil	2014	10	0
Total		87	0

== Honours ==
Flamengo

- Copa dos Campeões: 2001
- Campeonato Carioca: 2000, 2001, 2004
- Taça Guanabara: 2001, 2004
- Taça Rio: 2000
- Copa dos Campeões Mundiais: 1997

Inter Milan

- Serie A: 2005–06, 2006–07, 2007–08, 2008–09, 2009–10
- Coppa Italia: 2005–06, 2009–10, 2010–11
- Supercoppa Italiana: 2005, 2006, 2008, 2010
- UEFA Champions League: 2009–10
- FIFA Club World Cup: 2010

Benfica

- Primeira Liga: 2014–15, 2015–16, 2016–17
- Taça de Portugal: 2016–17
- Taça da Liga: 2014–15
- Supertaça Cândido de Oliveira: 2016

Brazil

- Copa América: 2004
- FIFA Confederations Cup: 2009, 2013

Individual

- Serie A Goalkeeper of the Year: 2008–09, 2009–10
- UEFA Club Goalkeeper of the Year: 2009–10
- ESM Team of the Year: 2009–10
- Pirata d'Oro (Internazionale Player Of The Year): 2010
- FIFA Confederations Cup Golden Glove Award: 2013
- FIFA Confederations Cup Dream Team: 2013
- Primeira Liga Best Goalkeeper: 2014–15
- Inter Milan Hall of Fame: 2020
- IFFHS CONMEBOL team of the decade 2011–2020

Records

- One of three Brazilian goalkeepers to be nominated for Ballon d'Or (shared with Dida and Alisson)
- Brazil national team record for most minutes without conceding a goal (581 minutes, set in 2010 FIFA World Cup qualification)
- The Brazilian goalkeeper with most penalty saves in Serie A: 10 saves from 26 attempts
- The Brazilian goalkeeper with most clean-sheets in Serie A: 101 in 228 matches
- Most clean-sheets in a single Serie A season for Inter: 17 in 2009–10 season (shared with Samir Handanović)
