= Lê (footballer, born February 1979) =

Brazilian footballer

Personal information
- Full name: Leandro Coelho Cardoso
- Date of birth: 3 February 1979 (age 47)
- Place of birth: Rio de Janeiro, Brazil
- Height: 1.75 m (5 ft 9 in)
- Positions: Attacking midfielder; forward

Youth career
- 1995–1997: Flamengo

Senior career*
Years	Team	Apps	(Gls)
1997–2003	Flamengo	84	(11)
2001	→ Internacional (loan)		
2002	→ Brasiliense (loan)		
2003	→ Ceará (loan)		
2003–2005	Belenenses		
2004	→ Nacional da Madeira (loan)		
2005	Volta Redonda		
2006	Portuguesa-RJ		
2006	Petro Atlético		
2007	Luverdense		
2008	Corinthians-AL		
2008	Anápolis		
2008	Teresópolis		
2009–2010	Luverdense		
- * Club domestic league appearances and goals as of 15 April 2024

Leandro Coelho Cardoso (born 3 February 1979), better known as Lê, is a Brazilian former professional footballer who played as an attacking midfielder and forward.

== Career ==
An attacking midfielder, Lê was revealed in CR Flamengo's youth sectors. He played 84 matches for the club and scored 11 goals, the most important of which was in the 1999 Copa Mercosur final. He played for teams in Portugal and for Petro Atlético de Angola, where he stated that he contracted cholera. He ended his career at Luverdense in 2010 after suffering from successive injuries.

== Honours ==
Flamengo

- Copa Mercosur: 1999
- Campeonato Carioca: 1999, 2000
- Taça Guanabara: 1999
- Taça Rio: 2000
- Copa dos Campeões Mundiais: 1997
- Torneio Quadrangular de Brasília: 1997
- Taça Cidade de Juiz de Fora: 1997

Luverdense

- Copa FMF: 2007
