= Maurinho Fonseca =

Brazilian footballer

Maurinho
Personal information
- Full name: Mauro Fonseca
- Date of birth: 8 February 1975 (age 51)
- Place of birth: Votuporanga, Brazil
- Height: 1.76 m (5 ft 9 in)
- Position: Right back

Youth career
- 1993–1995: Bragantino

Senior career*
Years	Team	Apps	(Gls)
1995–1996	Bragantino		
1997–2002	Flamengo	209	(10)
2002	→ Portuguesa (loan)		
2003	Marília		
2003	Coritiba		
2004	Paysandu		
2004–2007	Santa Clara		
2008	Beira-Mar		
2008	Náutico		
2010	Duque de Caxias		

Managerial career
- 2015: Criciúma (assistant)
- 2016: Sampaio Corrêa (assistant)
- 2018: Mageense
- 2019: Barra Mansa
- 2020: Serrano-RJ
- 2021: 7 de Abril
- 2022: Pérolas Negras
- 2024: Parintins
- 2024: Princesa do Solimões
- 2025: Parintins
- 2025: Concórdia
- * Club domestic league appearances and goals as of 11 October 2025

Mauro Fonseca (born 8 February 1975), better known as Maurinho, is a Brazilian former professional footballer and manager, who played as a right back.

== Playing career ==
Revealed by Bragantino, Maurinho was notable mainly for his time at CR Flamengo, where he made 209 appearances and scored 10 goals. With the club he was three times state champions, and also won 199 Copa Mercosur and 2001 Copa dos Campeões.

== Managerial career ==
Maurinho began his career as an assistant to former players Athirson and Dejan Petkovic. In 2018, in his first job as a coach, he was champion with Mageense, in the fourth level of football in Rio de Janeiro. He also had a notable spell at Pérolas Negras de Resende. In 2024, he coached Paritins in the Campeonato Amazonense, being announced in April as coach of Princesa do Solimões.

In the 2025 season, Fonseca again coached Parintins during the state championship, and Concórdia in the Copa Santa Catarina.

== Honours ==
=== Player ===
Flamengo

- Copa Mercosur: 1999
- Copa dos Campeões: 2001
- Campeonato Carioca: 1999, 2000, 2001
- Taça Guanabara: 1999, 2001
- Taça Rio: 2000
- Copa dos Campeões Mundiais: 1997
- Torneio Quadrangular de Brasília: 1997
- Taça Cidade de Juiz de Fora: 1997

=== Manager ===
Mageense

- Campeonato Carioca Série B2: 2018
