= Juan (footballer, born 1979) =

Brazilian footballer

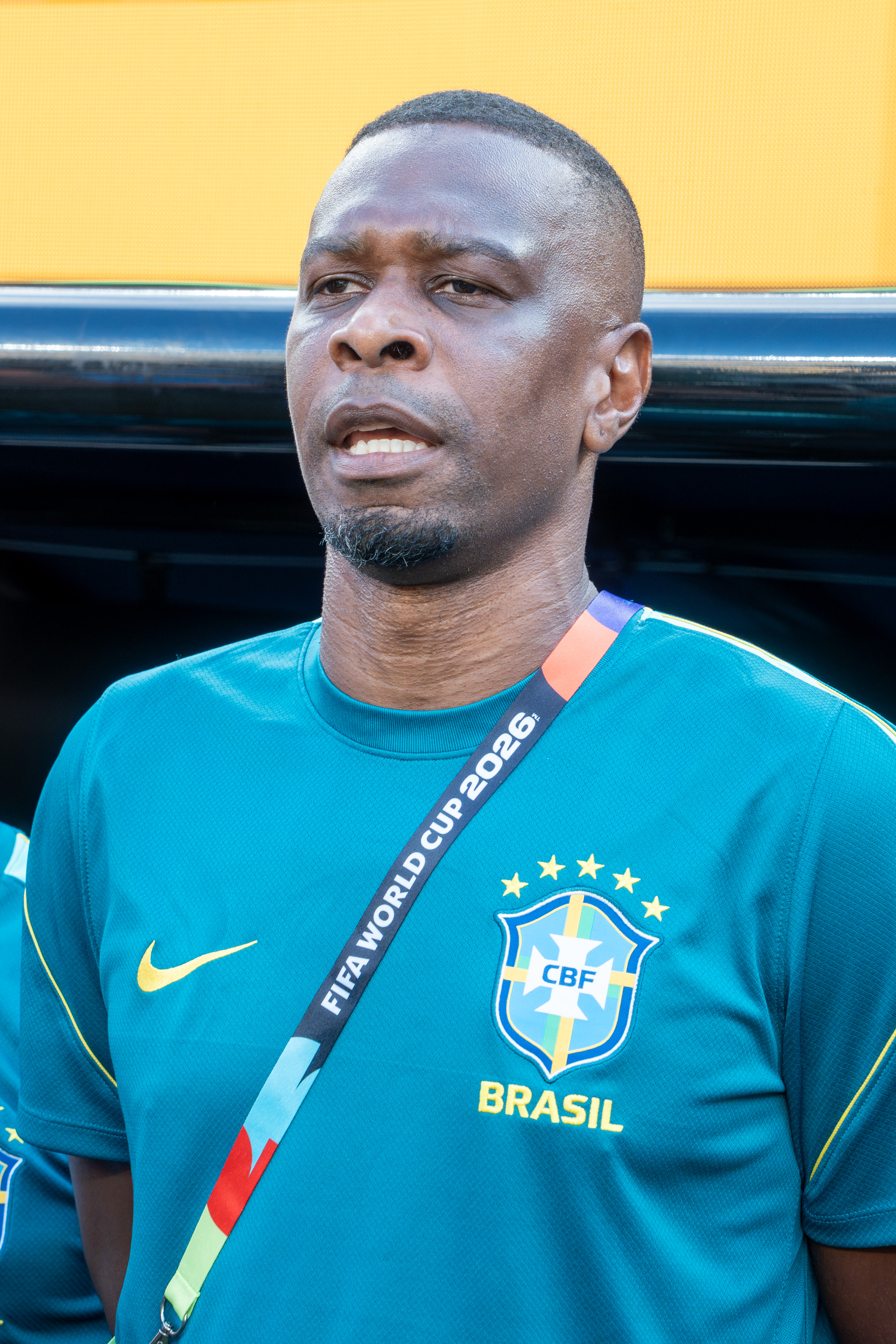
- Juan with Brazil at the 2026 FIFA World Cup

Personal information
- Full name: Juan Silveira dos Santos
- Date of birth: 1 February 1979 (age 47)
- Place of birth: Rio de Janeiro, Brazil
- Height: 1.83 m (6 ft 0 in)
- Position: Centre-back

Youth career
- 1989–1996: Flamengo

Senior career*
Years	Team	Apps	(Gls)
1996–2002	Flamengo	75	(5)
2002–2007	Bayer Leverkusen	139	(10)
2007–2012	Roma	118	(9)
2012–2015	Internacional	69	(4)
2016–2019	Flamengo	27	(0)
Total		428	(28)

International career
1995–1996	Brazil U17	6	(2)
1997–1999	Brazil U20	5	(0)
2001–2010	Brazil	79	(7)

Managerial career
- 2020–2024: Flamengo (technical manager)
- 2024–: Brazil (coordinator)
Medal record
Representing Brazil
FIFA Confederations Cup
Winner	2005 Germany
Winner	2009 South Africa
Copa América
Winner	2004 Peru
Winner	2007 Venezuela
- * Club domestic league appearances and goals

Juan Silveira dos Santos (Portuguese pronunciation: [ʁuˈɐ̃ silˈvejɾɐ dus ˈsɐ̃tus]; born 1 February 1979), commonly known as Juan, is a Brazilian former professional footballer who played as a centre-back. He currently works as Brasil national football team assistant under Carlo Ancelotti.

Having begun his career with Flamengo, he spent a decade playing in Europe in service of Bayer Leverkusen and Roma before returning to Brazil with Internacional in 2012.

Juan earned 79 caps and scored seven international goals for Brazil. He represented the nation at two FIFA World Cups, three FIFA Confederations Cups and three Copa América tournaments, winning two apiece of the latter two events.

== Club career ==
=== Early career ===
Born in Rio de Janeiro, Juan played for six years for Flamengo in Brazil. In 2002, he moved to Bayer Leverkusen. He played five years in Germany scoring ten goals for Bayer. In 2007, he moved to Roma for €6.3 million.

=== Roma ===
Juan played for Roma between 2007 and 2012. In all competitions for Roma he scored 11 goals in more than 140 appearances. With Roma he won one Coppa Italia and Supercoppa Italiana. He was a first-choice centre-back for Roma, and wore the number four jersey. Juan scored his first goal for Roma against Reggina on 16 September 2007.

In the 2011–12 season, he usually played alongside Gabriel Heinze. He scored his seventh goal for Roma in a 5–1 win over Cesena on 21 January 2012. He scored again in Roma's 4–2 loss Cagliari in Sardinia, followed by his third goal of the season, and the opening goal, in Roma's 4–0 demolition of Internazionale at the Stadio Olimpico. He scored nine goals for Roma during his time there.

=== Internacional ===
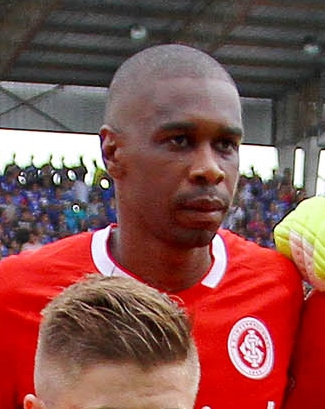
Juan with Internacional.

On 16 July 2012, Roma and Juan agreed to cancel his contract by mutual consent, which was set to end on 30 June 2013. On the same day, Juan signed a two-year contract with the club of Porto Alegre Internacional, with a one-year option.

=== Return to Flamengo ===
On 11 November 2015, Juan and Internacional agreed to cancel his contract by mutual consent, almost a month later on 8 December 2015, Juan confirmed his return to Flamengo.

Juan announced his retirement after winning the 2019 Campeonato Carioca and played his farewell match on 27 April 2019, in Flamengo's 3–1 win over Cruzeiro.

== International career ==
Juan played on Brazil's Copa América-winning teams in 2004 and 2007, also winning the FIFA Confederations Cup in 2005 and 2009. He scored the winning goal in the penalty shootout at the end of the 2004 Copa América final against Argentina in Lima. In the quarter-finals of the same competition in 2007, he opened the scoring in a 6–1 thrashing of Chile in Puerto La Cruz.

On 28 June 2010, Juan scored the first goal against Chile with a headed finish from a corner as Brazil won 3–0 to advance to the quarter-finals of the 2010 FIFA World Cup.

== Career statistics ==
=== Club ===
Appearances and goals by club, season and competition
Club	Season	League			Cup		Continental		Other		Total	
Club	Season	Division	Apps	Goals	Apps	Goals	Apps	Goals	Apps	Goals	Apps	Goals
Flamengo	1996	Série A	11	0	0	0	0	0	–		11	0
Flamengo	1997	Série A	14	2	4	1	2	0	–		20	3
Flamengo	1998	Série A	10	0	1	0	5	0	–		16	0
Flamengo	1999	Série A	7	0	0	0	7	1	–		14	2
Flamengo	2000	Série A	15	2	7	0	4	2	–		26	3
Flamengo	2001	Série A	18	1	6	1	9	5	–		33	7
Flamengo	2002	Série A	0	0	0	0	3	0	–		3	0
Flamengo	Total		75	5	18	2	20	8	0	0	113	15
Bayer Leverkusen	2002–03	Bundesliga	24	2	2	0	3	2	–		29	4
Bayer Leverkusen	2003–04	Bundesliga	30	2	1	0	0	0	–		31	2
Bayer Leverkusen	2004–05	Bundesliga	27	1	3	0	9	2	–		39	3
Bayer Leverkusen	2005–06	Bundesliga	30	3	1	0	1	0	–		32	3
Bayer Leverkusen	2006–07	Bundesliga	28	2	1	1	10	1	–		39	4
Bayer Leverkusen	Total		139	10	8	1	23	5	0	0	170	16
Roma	2007–08	Serie A	22	2	1	0	8	1	–		31	3
Roma	2008–09	Serie A	21	2	1	0	4	1	–		26	3
Roma	2009–10	Serie A	29	0	2	0	5	0	–		36	0
Roma	2010–11	Serie A	31	2	3	0	3	0	–		37	2
Roma	2011–12	Serie A	16	3	0	0	0	0	–		16	3
Roma	Total		118	9	8	0	20	2	0	0	146	11
Internacional	2012	Série A	6	1	0	0	–		–		6	1
Internacional	2013	Série A	32	3	7	0	–		13 (Note: Appearance(s) in Campeonato Gaúcho.)	2	52	5
Internacional	2014	Série A	21	0	2	0	–		8	0	31	0
Internacional	2015	Série A	10	0	0	0	8 (Note: Appearance(s) in Copa Libertadores.)	1	7	1	25	2
Internacional	Total		69	4	9	0	8	1	28	3	114	8
Flamengo	2016	Série A	9	0	4	0	3 (Note: Appearance(s) in Copa Sudamericana.)	0	16 (Note: 12 appearances in Campeonato Carioca, four appearances in Primeira Liga.)	0	32	0
Flamengo	2017	Série A	13	0	6	0	10 (Note: One appearance in Copa Libertadores, nine appearances and two goals in Copa Sudamericana.)	2	6 (Note: Four appearances and one goal in Campeonato Carioca, two appearances in Primeira Liga.)	1	35	3
Flamengo	2018	Série A	4	0	0	0	5	0	5 (Note: Appearance(s) in Campeonato Carioca.)	0	14	0
Flamengo	2019	Série A	1	0	0	0	0	0	1	0	2	0
Flamengo	Total		27	0	10	0	18	2	28	1	83	3
Career total			428	28	53	3	89	18	56	4	626	53

=== International ===
Appearances and goals by national team and year
National team	Year	Apps	Goals
Brazil	2001	7	0
Brazil	2002	3	0
Brazil	2003	4	0
Brazil	2004	13	1
Brazil	2005	9	1
Brazil	2006	11	0
Brazil	2007	15	2
Brazil	2008	5	0
Brazil	2009	5	2
Brazil	2010	7	1
Total		79	7

Scores and results list Brazil's goal tally first, score column indicates score after each Juan goal.

List of international goals scored by Juan
No.	Date	Venue	Opponent	Score	Result	Competition
1	11 July 2004	Estadio Monumental Virgen de Chapi, Arequipa, Peru	Costa Rica	2–0	4–1	2004 Copa América
2	4 September 2005	Estádio Mané Garrincha, Brasília, Brazil	Chile	1–0	5–0	2006 FIFA World Cup qualifying
3	24 March 2007	Ullevi, Gothenburg, Sweden	Chile	4–0	4–0	Friendly
4	7 July 2007	Estadio Olímpico Luis Ramos, Puerto la Cruz, Venezuela	Chile	1–0	6–1	2007 Copa América
5	6 June 2009	Estadio Centenario, Montevideo, Uruguay	Uruguay	2–0	4–0	2010 FIFA World Cup qualifying
6	15 June 2009	Free State Stadium, Bloemfontein, South Africa	Egypt	3–1	4–3	2009 FIFA Confederations Cup
7	28 June 2010	Ellis Park Stadium, Johannesburg, South Africa	Chile	1–0	3–0	2010 FIFA World Cup

== Honours ==
Flamengo

- Campeonato Carioca: 1996, 1999, 2000, 2001, 2017, 2019
- Copa dos Campeões: 2001
- Copa Mercosur: 1999
- Copa de Oro: 1996

Roma

- Coppa Italia: 2007–08
- Supercoppa Italiana: 2007

Internacional

- Campeonato Gaúcho: 2013, 2014, 2015

Brazil

- Copa América: 2004, 2007
- FIFA Confederations Cup: 2005, 2009
- Lunar New Year Cup: 2005

Individual

- kicker Bundesliga Team of the Season: 2003–04
- Copa América Team of the Tournament: 2004, 2007
