= 1999 Copa Mercosur =

Copa Mercosur 1999
Tournament details
- Dates: 27 July – 20 December 1999
- Teams: 20 (from 5 associations)

Final positions
- Champions: (Brazil) Flamengo (1st title)
- Runners-up: (Brazil) Palmeiras

Tournament statistics
- Matches played: 74
- Goals scored: 224 (3.03 per match)
- Top scorer: (Brazil) Romário (8 goals)

The Copa Mercosur 1999 was the 2nd season of the Copa Mercosur, a club competition played between teams from the Southern part of South America.

The competition started on 27 July 1999 and concluded on 20 December 1999 with Flamengo beating Palmeiras in the final.

== Participants ==
Country	Team
Argentina (6 berths)	Boca Juniors
Argentina (6 berths)	Independiente
Argentina (6 berths)	Racing
Argentina (6 berths)	River Plate
Argentina (6 berths)	San Lorenzo
Argentina (6 berths)	Vélez Sarsfield
Brazil (7 berths)	Corinthians
Brazil (7 berths)	Cruzeiro
Brazil (7 berths)	Grêmio
Brazil (7 berths)	Flamengo
Brazil (7 berths)	Palmeiras
Brazil (7 berths)	São Paulo
Brazil (7 berths)	Vasco da Gama
Chile (3 berths)	Colo-Colo
Chile (3 berths)	Universidad Católica
Chile (3 berths)	Universidad de Chile
Paraguay (2 berths)	Cerro Porteño
Paraguay (2 berths)	Olimpia
Uruguay (2 berths)	Nacional
Uruguay (2 berths)	Peñarol

== Details ==
- The 20 teams were divided into 5 groups of 4 teams. Each team plays the other teams in the group twice. The top team from each group qualified for the quarter-finals along with the best 3 runners up.
- From the quarter finals to the final, two legs were played in each round. In the result of a draw, the match was decided by a penalty shoot out.

== Group stage ==
=== Group A ===
Pos	Team	Pld	W	D	L	GF	GA	GD	Pts	Qualification	(Brazil) CRU	(Brazil) PAL	(Argentina) RIV	(Argentina) RAC
1	(Brazil) Cruzeiro	6	5	1	0	16	2	+14	16	Advance to Quarter-finals	—	3–0	2–0	2–0
2	(Brazil) Palmeiras	6	3	2	1	19	10	+9	11	Advance to Quarter-finals	2–2	—	3–0	7–0
3	(Argentina) River Plate	6	2	1	3	8	11	−3	7		0–3	3–3	—	4–0
4	(Argentina) Racing	6	0	0	6	2	22	−20	0		0–4	2–4	0–1	—

=== Group B ===
Pos	Team	Pld	W	D	L	GF	GA	GD	Pts	Qualification	(Argentina) IND	(Brazil) COR	(Brazil) GRE	(Argentina) VEL
1	(Argentina) Independiente	6	3	2	1	7	5	+2	11	Advance to Quarter-finals	—	2–0	1–0	1–1
2	(Brazil) Corinthians	6	3	1	2	10	5	+5	10	Advance to Quarter-finals	1–2	—	4–1	2–0
3	(Brazil) Grêmio	6	2	2	2	5	6	−1	8		2–0	0–0	—	1–0
4	(Argentina) Vélez Sársfield	6	0	3	3	3	9	−6	3		1–1	0–3	1–1	—

=== Group C ===
Pos	Team	Pld	W	D	L	GF	GA	GD	Pts	Qualification	(Argentina) SAN	(Argentina) BOC	(Brazil) SAO	(Chile) CAT
1	(Argentina) San Lorenzo	6	4	0	2	8	5	+3	12	Advance to Quarter-finals	—	1–0	1–0	4–0
2	(Argentina) Boca Juniors	6	3	1	2	10	5	+5	10		0–1	—	5–1	1–0
3	(Brazil) São Paulo	6	3	1	2	11	8	+3	10		4–1	1–1	—	2–0
4	(Chile) Universidad Católica	6	1	0	5	2	13	−11	3		1–0	1–3	0–3	—

=== Group D ===
Pos	Team	Pld	W	D	L	GF	GA	GD	Pts	Qualification	(Uruguay) PEÑ	(Uruguay) NAC	(Brazil) VAS	(Paraguay) CER
1	(Uruguay) Peñarol	6	3	3	0	10	7	+3	12	Advance to Quarter-finals	—	0–0	2–1	3–2
2	(Uruguay) Nacional	6	3	1	2	10	6	+4	10		1–2	—	3–0	3–1
3	(Brazil) Vasco da Gama	6	2	2	2	9	8	+1	8		1–1	1–0	—	5–1
4	(Paraguay) Cerro Porteño	6	0	2	4	9	17	−8	2		2–2	2–3	1–1	—

=== Group E ===
Pos	Team	Pld	W	D	L	GF	GA	GD	Pts	Qualification	(Paraguay) OLI	(Brazil) FLA	(Chile) COL	(Chile) UC
1	(Paraguay) Olimpia	6	4	0	2	10	7	+3	12	Advance to Quarter-finals	—	3–1	2–1	2–1
2	(Brazil) Flamengo	6	3	1	2	16	8	+8	10	Advance to Quarter-finals	2–1	—	2–2	7–0
3	(Chile) Colo Colo	6	2	2	2	6	8	−2	8		1–0	0–4	—	0–0
4	Universidad de Chile	6	1	1	4	4	13	−9	4		1–2	2–0	0–2	—

== Quarter-finals ==
=== First leg ===
22 October 1999

Palmeiras (Brazil)	7–3	(Brazil) Cruzeiro
Paulo Nunes 16', 90'; Evair 56', 79'; Alex 77'; Euller 86', 90'		Isaías 19'; Ricardinho 28'; Marcelo Ramos 84'

Parque Antárctica, São Paulo, Brazil

2 November 1999

Independiente (Argentina)	1–1	(Brazil) Flamengo
Calderón 76'		Fábio Baiano 60'

Estadio Libertadores de América, Buenos Aires, Argentina

21 October 1999

San Lorenzo (Argentina)	2–1	(Brazil) Corinthians
Márcio Costa 43' (o.g.); Córdoba 66'		Ricardinho 25'

Estádio Pedro Bidegain, Buenos Aires, Argentina

20 October 1999

Olimpia (Paraguay)	1–0	(Uruguay) Peñarol
Monzón 70'

Estadio Manuel Ferreira, Asunción, Paraguay

=== Second leg ===
29 October 1999

Cruzeiro (Brazil)	2–0	(Brazil) Palmeiras
Müller 45'; Valdo 48'

Mineirão, Belo Horizonte, Brazil

Palmeiras won 7–5 on aggregate.

5 November 1999

Flamengo (Brazil)	4–0	(Argentina) Independiente
Leandro Machado 17', 55'; Fábio Baiano 20'; Romário 24'

Maracanã, Rio de Janeiro, Brazil

Flamengo won 5–1 on aggregate.

27 October 1999

Corinthians (Brazil)	1–2	(Argentina) San Lorenzo
Edilson 14'		Franco 17'; Romeo 51'

San Lorenzo won 4–2 on aggregate.

27 October 1999

Peñarol (Uruguay)	3–0	(Paraguay) Olimpia
Gabriel Cedrés 15'; Walter Pandiani 49', 64'

Peñarol won 3–1 on aggregate.

== Semi-finals ==
=== First leg ===
18 November 1999

San Lorenzo (Argentina)	1–0	(Brazil) Palmeiras
Córdoba 57' (pen.)

25 November 1999

Flamengo (Brazil)	3–0	(Uruguay) Peñarol
Leandro Machado 29'; Maurinho 44'; Lê 82'

=== Second leg ===
7 December 1999

Palmeiras (Brazil)	3–0	(Argentina) San Lorenzo
Júnior Baiano 3'; Arce 75', 90' (pen.)

Palmeiras won 3–1 on aggregate.

9 December 1999

Peñarol (Uruguay)	3–2	(Brazil) Flamengo
Bengoechea 45', 90' (pen.); Martin Garcia 79'		Athirson 70' (pen.); Reinaldo 78'

Flamengo won 5–3 on aggregate.

== Final ==
=== First leg ===
December 16, 1999

Flamengo (Brazil)	4–3	(Brazil) Palmeiras
Juan 6'; Caio 70', 75'; Reinaldo 85'		Junior Baiano 43'; Asprilla 68'; Paulo Nunes 73'

Rio de Janeiro, Maracanã
Attendance: 13,414
Referee: Wilson de Souza Mendonça

=== Second leg ===
December 20, 1999

Palmeiras (Brazil)	3 – 3 (6 – 7 agg.)	(Brazil) Flamengo
Arce 21' (pen.), 58'; Paulo Nunes 66'		Caio 46'; Rodrigo Mendes 56'; Lê 83'

São Paulo, Parque Antárctica
Attendance: 32,000
Referee: Luciano Almeida

Palmeiras	Flamengo

GK	1	(Brazil) Marcos
RB	2	(Paraguay) Chiqui Arce
CB	4	(Brazil) Cléber
CB	3	(Brazil) Júnior Baiano	Booked
LB	6	(Brazil) Júnior
DM	8	(Brazil) César Sampaio (c)	Booked	(substituted off) a'
RM	24	(Brazil) Euller		(substituted off) c'
CM	10	(Brazil) Alex
CM	11	(Brazil) Zinho
LM	20	(Colombia) Faustino Asprilla	Booked
CF	7	(Brazil) Paulo Nunes		(substituted off) b'
Substitutes:
FW	9	(Brazil) Oséas		(substituted in) c'
DF	16	(Brazil) Rogério		(substituted in) b'
FW	18	(Brazil) Edmílson		(substituted in) a'
Manager:
(Brazil) Luiz Felipe Scolari

GK	1	(Brazil) Clemer
RB	15	(Brazil) Maurinho	Booked
CB	13	(Brazil) Célio Silva
CB	20	(Brazil) Juan
LB	6	(Brazil) Athirson	Booked
DM	8	(Brazil) Leandro Ávila (c)
CM	23	(Brazil) Marcelo Rosa		(substituted off) a'
CM	19	(Brazil) Léo Inácio		(substituted off) b'
RW	24	(Brazil) Reinaldo
LW	16	(Brazil) Caio Ribeiro		(substituted off) c'
CF	9	(Brazil) Leandro Machado	Sent off (straight red)
Substitutes:
MF	10	(Brazil) Iranildo		(substituted in) c'
FW	18	(Brazil) Rodrigo Mendes		(substituted in) b'
MF	22	(Brazil) Lê		(substituted in) a'
Manager:
(Brazil) Carlinhos

1999 Copa Mercosur
Winner

Flamengo
First Title
