= Iranildo (given name) =

Iranildo is a masculine given name. Notable people with the name include:

- Iranildo Conceição Espíndola (born 1969), Brazilian para table tennis player
- Iranildo Hermínio Ferreira (born 1976), commonly known mononymously as Iranildo, Brazilian footballer
