= 1997 Copa dos Campeões Mundiais =

Tournament details
- Country: Brazil
- Dates: 12 June–1 July
- Teams: 4

Final positions
- Champions: Flamengo
- Runners-up: São Paulo
- Third place: Santos
- Fourth place: Grêmio

Tournament statistics
- Matches played: 7
- Goals scored: 20 (2.86 per match)
- Top goal scorer(s): Dodô (São Paulo); 4 goals

The 1997 Copa dos Campeões Mundiais was the third edition of the Copa dos Campeões Mundiais. Flamengo has won their first title.

== Participants ==
| Club | Intercontinental Cup edition winners |
|---|---|
| Santos | 1962, 1963 |
| Flamengo | 1981 |
| Grêmio | 1983 |
| São Paulo | 1992, 1993 |

== First stage ==
12 June

| Santos (São Paulo (state)) | 0–0 | (Rio de Janeiro (state)) Flamengo |

Estádio Pedro Pedrossian, Campo Grande
Referee: Carlos Eugênio Simon

14 June

| Grêmio (Rio Grande do Sul) | 1–2 | (São Paulo (state)) São Paulo |
|---|---|---|
| Bordon 58' (o.g.) | | Dodô 66', 89' |

Estádio Pedro Pedrossian, Campo Grande
Referee: Sidrack Marinho

17 June

| São Paulo (São Paulo (state)) | 3–0 | (São Paulo (state)) Santos |
|---|---|---|
| Dodô 16', 77'; Belletti 90+2' |

Estádio Pedro Pedrossian, Campo Grande
Referee: Oscar Roberto Godói

21 June

| Flamengo (Rio de Janeiro (state)) | 2–2 | (São Paulo (state)) São Paulo |
|---|---|---|
| Iranildo 9' (pen.); Maurinho 66' | | Marques 45+2', 60' |

Estádio Mané Garrincha, Brasília
Referee: Márcio Rezende de Freitas

24 June

| Grêmio (Rio Grande do Sul) | 2–4 | (Rio de Janeiro (state)) Flamengo |
|---|---|---|
| Emerson 45+5'; Gilmar 82' | | Lúcio 3', 60'; Fabiano 56'; Maurinho 74' |

Estádio Mané Garrincha, Brasília
Referee: Oscar Roberto Godói

26 June

| Santos (São Paulo (state)) | 2–1 | (Rio Grande do Sul) Grêmio |
|---|---|---|
| Alessandro 36', 74' | | Luís Carlos Goiano 66' |

Estádio Mané Garrincha, Brasília
Referee: Wilson de Souza Mendonça

=== Standings ===
| Team | Pts | P | W | D | L | GF | GA | GD |
|---|---|---|---|---|---|---|---|---|
| (São Paulo (state)) São Paulo | 7 | 3 | 2 | 1 | 0 | 7 | 3 | 4 |
| (Rio de Janeiro (state)) Flamengo | 5 | 3 | 1 | 2 | 0 | 6 | 4 | 2 |
| (São Paulo (state)) Santos | 4 | 3 | 1 | 1 | 1 | 2 | 4 | -2 |
| (Rio Grande do Sul) Grêmio | 0 | 3 | 0 | 0 | 3 | 4 | 8 | -4 |

== Final ==
1 July

| São Paulo (São Paulo (state)) | 0–1 | (Rio de Janeiro (state)) Flamengo |
|---|---|---|
| | | Iranildo 40' |

Estádio Mané Garrincha, Brasília
Referee: Wilson de Souza Mendonça

São Paulo
Flamengo

| GK | 1 | Paulo Sérgio |
| DF | 2 | Cláudio |
| DF | 3 | Bordon |
| DF | 4 | Rogério Pinheiro |
| DF | 6 | Serginho |
| MF | 5 | Axel |
| MF | 8 | Belletti |
| MF | 7 | Luís Carlos |
| FW | 10 | Denílson (substituted off) |
| FW | 11 | Dodô |
| FW | 9 | Aristizabal (substituted off) |
Substitutes:
| MF | | Adriano | Substituted in |
| FW | | França | Substituted in |
Manager:
Darío Pereyra

| GK | 1 | Júlio César |
| DF | 2 | Fabio Baiano |
| DF | 3 | Júnior Baiano |
| DF | 4 | Fabiano |
| DF | 6 | Gilberto |
| MF | 5 | Jamir |
| MF | 8 | Jorginho |
| MF | 7 | Maurinho |
| MF | 10 | Iranildo |
| FW | 9 | Evandro |
| FW | 11 | Lúcio |
Manager:
Sebastião Rocha

=== Champion ===
1997 Copa dos Campeões Mundiais
(Rio de Janeiro (state))
Flamengo
1st. title
