= Evandro (footballer, born 1970) =

Brazilian footballer

Personal information
- Full name: Evandro Gama do Nascimento Alexandre
- Date of birth: 9 December 1970 (age 55)
- Place of birth: Rio de Janeiro, Brazil
- Height: 1.64 m (5 ft 5 in)
- Position: Attacking midfielder

Senior career*
| Years | Team | Apps | (Gls) |
| 1988 | Vasco da Gama | | |
| 1989–1991 | Gama | | |
| 1991 | Pires do Rio | | |
| 1992–1996 | Goiás | | |
| 1997 | Flamengo | 61 | (3) |
| 1998–2002 | Portuguesa | 200 | (27) |
| 2001 | → Sport Recife (loan) | | |
| 2002–2003 | Brasiliense | | |
| 2003 | Ituano | | |
| 2004 | Sport Recife | | |
| 2004 | Vila Nova | | |
| 2005 | América-RN | | |
| 2006 | Fortaleza | | |
| 2006 | São Bento | | |
| 2006 | Remo | | |
| 2007 | Atlético Sorocaba | | |
| 2008 | Legião | | |
| 2009 | Brasília | | |
- * Club domestic league appearances and goals as of 1 February 2024

Evandro Gama do Nascimento Alexandre (born 9 December 1970), simply known as Evandro, is a Brazilian former professional footballer who played as an attacking midfielder.

== Career ==
An attacking midfielder, Evandro began his career in 1988 at Vasco da Gama. He played for Gama and Goiás, where he managed to become state champion, until arriving at Flamengo, where he won the Copa dos Campeões Mundiais. In 1998 he arrived at Portuguesa where he played 200 matches and scored 27 goals.

Evandro was also champion of the Campeonato Brasileiro Série C for two consecutive seasons, in 2002 with Brasiliense and in 2003 with Ituano. He ended his career in 2009 at Brasília FC.

== Honours ==
Gama

- Campeonato Brasiliense: 1990

Goiás

- Campeonato Goiano: 1994, 1996

Flamengo

- Copa dos Campeões Mundiais: 1997
- Copa Rio-Brasília: 1997

Brasiliense

- Campeonato Brasileiro Série C: 2002

Ituano

- Campeonato Brasileiro Série C: 2003
