= Marcelo Rosa =

Marcelo Rosa may refer to:

- Marcelo Rosa (footballer, born 1976), Brazilian football midfielder
- Marcelo Rosa (footballer, born 1991), Brazilian football midfielder
