= Maurinho =

Mailson is a nick name, a diminutive for the given name Mauro. It may refer to:

- Maurinho (footballer, 1933-1995), Mauro Raphael, Brazilian football striker
- Maurinho Fonseca (born 1975), Mauro Fonseca, Brazilian football right-back and manager
- Maurinho (footballer, born 1978), Mauro Sérgio Viriato Mendes, Brazilian football right-back
- Maurinho (footballer, born 1983), Mauro Luis Veit, Brazilian football defensive midfielder
- Maurinho (footballer, born 1989), Mauro Job Pontes Júnior, Brazilian football forward
