= Sebastião Rocha (football manager) =

Brazilian football manager

Personal information
- Full name: Sebastião Carlos da Silva Rocha
- Date of birth: 29 December 1954 (age 71)
- Place of birth: Rio de Janeiro, Brazil

Managerial career
- Years: Team
- 1979–1981: Fluminense (assistant)
- 1982–1984: Al Khaleej
- 1984: America-RJ
- 1985–1988: Flamengo (youth)
- 1989: Fluminense (youth)
- 1990: Al Khaleej
- 1990–1991: FAR Rabat
- 1995: Flamengo (assistant)
- 1995–1996: Al Sadd
- 1997: Botafogo
- 1997: Flamengo
- 1998: Mogi Mirim
- 2000: America-RJ
- 2001: Rio Branco-ES
- 2004: Serra
- 2005: Cachoeiro-ES
- 2005–2006: Al Dhafra
- 2007–2009: Al Shamal
- 2010: São Raimundo-PA
- 2010: Bahia (assistant)
- 2014: São Raimundo-PA
- 2019: Angra dos Reis
- 2020: Luziânia
- 2021: Ceilandense
- 2023: Luziânia

Sebastião Carlos da Silva Rocha (born 29 December 1954), simply known as Sebastião Rocha, is a Brazilian professional football manager.

== Career ==
Graduated in physical education, Sebastião Rocha began his career as a trainer at Fluminense FC in 1979. Invited by Al-Khaleej FC in Saudi Arabia, which aimed to develop football, he accepted the position as manager. He later coached America in 1984 and Fluminense U20, champion of the Copa SP in 1989. In 1997 he coached the main teams of Botafogo, and later Flamengo, becoming champion of the Copa dos Campeões Mundiais. Rocha coached other major teams in the Arab world such as FAR Rabat, Al Sadd and Al Dhafra over the years, returning to Brazil in 2010 to coach São Raimundo in 2010 Campeonato Brasileiro Série C. He currently works in football in the Federal District, at AA Luziânia.

In 1995 he was an assistant to Apolinho, a radio presenter who managed Flamengo for 21 matches.

== Honours ==
Fluminense

- Copa São Paulo de Futebol Júnior: 1989

Flamengo

- Copa dos Campeões Mundiais: 1997
- Torneio Quadrangular de Brasília: 1997
