= Serie A Goalkeeper of the Year =

Sports award

The AIC Goalkeeper of the Year (Italian: Migliore portiere AIC) was a yearly award organized by the Italian Footballers' Association (AIC) since 1997 to 2010 as part of the Oscar del Calcio awards, given to the goalkeeper who had been considered to have performed the best over the previous Serie A season.

Since 2011, a goalkeeper is chosen as part of the Serie A Team of the Year award within the Gran Galà del Calcio awards event.

== Winners ==
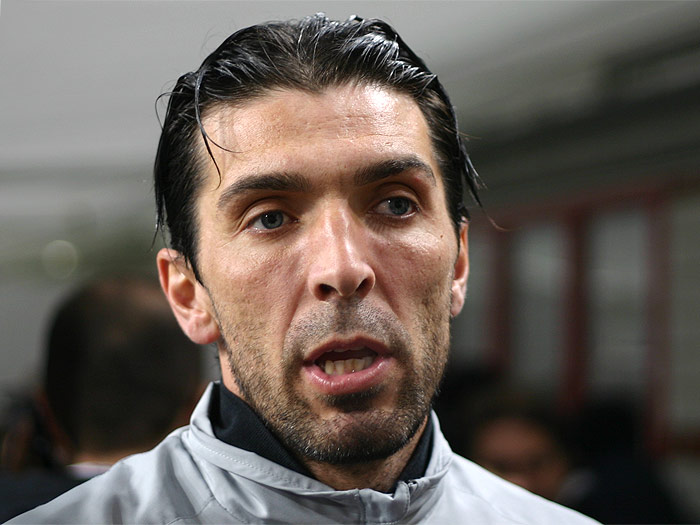
Gianluigi Buffon has won the award a record thirteen times

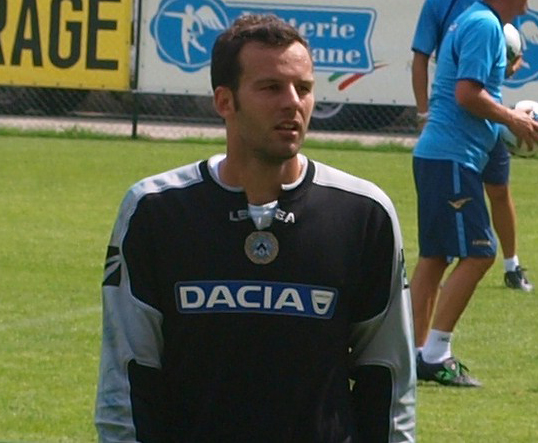
Samir Handanović has won the award thrice with two different clubs, Udinese and Inter

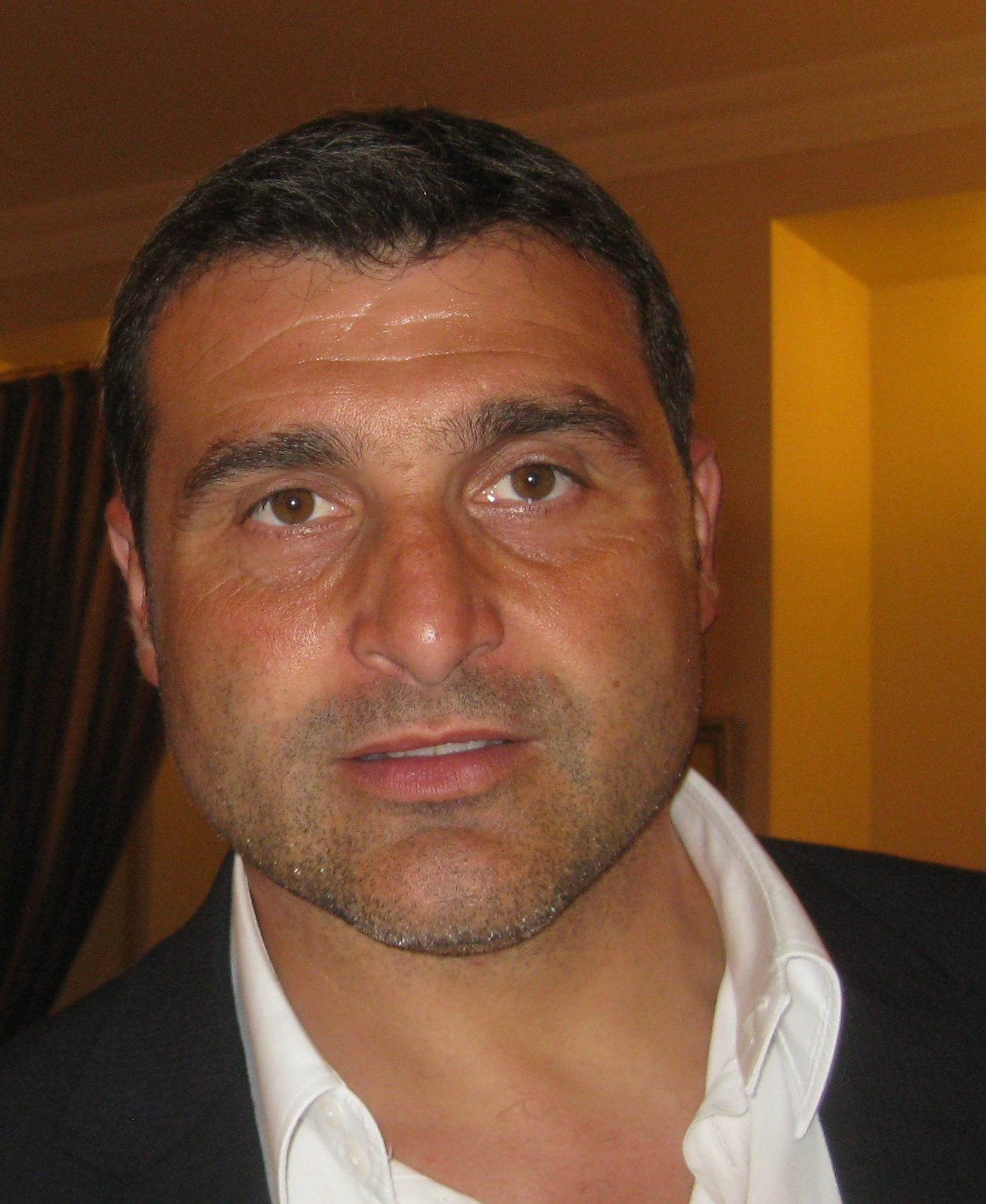
Angelo Peruzzi won the inaugural award in 1997, repeating the feat in 1998 and 2007

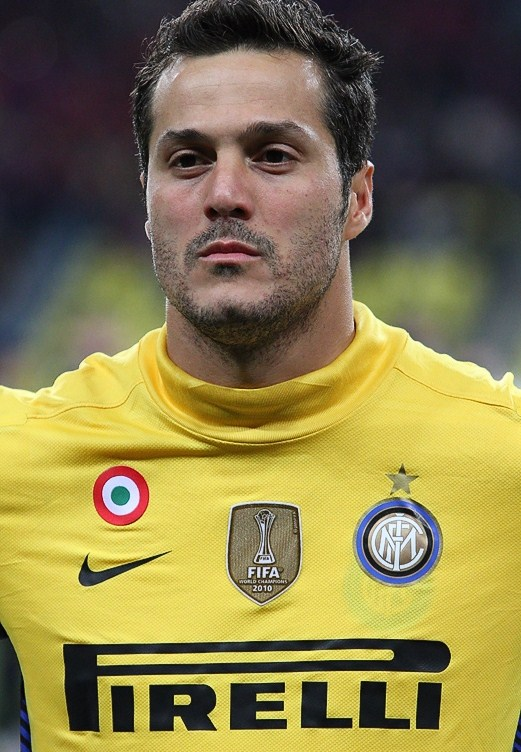
Júlio César was the first non-Italian to win the award and won the award back-to-back in 2009 and 2010

=== Serie A Goalkeeper of the Year ===
Key
‡	Indicates player won the Serie A Footballer of the Year in the same season
§	Denotes the club were Serie A champions in the same season

Season	Player	Club	Ref(s)
1996–97	(Italy) Angelo Peruzzi	Juventus^{§}	
1997–98	(Italy) Angelo Peruzzi	Juventus^{§}	
1998–99	(Italy) Gianluigi Buffon	Parma	
1999–2000	(Italy) Francesco Toldo	Fiorentina	
2000–01	(Italy) Gianluigi Buffon	Parma	
2001–02	(Italy) Gianluigi Buffon	Juventus^{§}	
2002–03	(Italy) Gianluigi Buffon	Juventus^{§}	
2003–04	(Italy) Gianluigi Buffon	Juventus	
2004–05	(Italy) Gianluigi Buffon	Juventus	
2005–06	(Italy) Gianluigi Buffon	Juventus	
2006–07	(Italy) Angelo Peruzzi	Lazio	
2007–08	(Italy) Gianluigi Buffon	Juventus	
2008–09	(Brazil) Júlio César	Internazionale^{§}	
2009–10	(Brazil) Júlio César	Internazionale^{§}	

=== Goalkeeper in Serie A Team of the Year ===
Season	Player	Club	Ref(s)
2010–11	(Slovenia) Samir Handanović	Udinese	
2011–12	(Italy) Gianluigi Buffon	Juventus^{§}	
2012–13	(Slovenia) Samir Handanović	Internazionale	
2013–14	(Italy) Gianluigi Buffon	Juventus^{§}	
2014–15	(Italy) Gianluigi Buffon	Juventus^{§}	
2015–16	(Italy) Gianluigi Buffon	Juventus^{§}	
2016–17	(Italy) Gianluigi Buffon^{‡}	Juventus^{§}	
2017–18	(Brazil) Alisson	Roma	
2018–19	(Slovenia) Samir Handanović	Internazionale	
2019–20	(Italy) Gianluigi Donnarumma	Milan	
2020–21	(Italy) Gianluigi Donnarumma	Milan	
2021–22	(France) Mike Maignan	Milan^{§}	
2022–23	(France) Mike Maignan	Milan	
2023–24	(Switzerland) Yann Sommer	Internazionale^{§}	
2024–25	(Serbia) Mile Svilar	Roma	
2026–26	(Serbia) Mile Svilar	Roma	

=== By club ===
Club	Players	Total
Juventus	2	13
Internazionale	3	5
Milan	2	4
Roma	2	3
Parma	1	2
Fiorentina	1	1
Lazio	1	1
Udinese	1	1

=== By country ===
Country	Players	Total
Italy	4	19
Brazil	2	3
Slovenia	1	3
France	1	2
Serbia	1	2
Switzerland	1	1

=== Multiple winners ===
Player	Total
(Italy) Gianluigi Buffon	13
(Italy) Angelo Peruzzi	3
(Slovenia) Samir Handanović	3
(Brazil) Júlio César	2
(Italy) Gianluigi Donnarumma	2
(France) Mike Maignan	2
(Serbia) Mile Svilar	2

== See also ==
- Gran Galà del Calcio
- Serie A Team of the Year
- Serie A Awards
