= Cláudio Guadagno =

Brazilian footballer

Cláudio
Personal information
- Full name: Cláudio Guadagno
- Date of birth: 26 September 1967 (age 59)
- Place of birth: Rio de Janeiro, Brazil
- Position: Right back

Senior career*
Years	Team	Apps	(Gls)
1989	EC Miguel Couto		
1989–1990	Goiatuba		
1990–1991	Bangu		
1992	Flamengo	28	(0)
1993–1994	Palmeiras	103	(1)
1995–1998	São Paulo	117	(1)
1996	→ Santos (loan)		
1999	Fluminense	12	(0)
- * Club domestic league appearances and goals as of 26 September 2023

Cláudio Guadagno (born 26 September 1967), also known Cláudio, is a Brazilian former professional footballer and manager who played as a right back.

== Career ==
Cláudio started his career at Miguel Couto de Niterói, and later played for Goiatuba and Bangu. In 1992 he arrived at Flamengo where he was part of the Brazilian champion squad. At Palmeiras, he was once again Brazilian champion on two more occasions, thus becoming three consecutive champions. He also played for São Paulo where he won the 1998 Campeonato Paulista as a reserve, and for Fluminense in 1999 where he retired.

== Honours ==
Flamengo

- Campeonato Brasileiro: 1992
- Taça Brahma dos Campeões: 1992

Palmeiras

- Campeonato Paulista: 1993, 1994
- Torneio Rio-São Paulo: 1993
- Campeonato Brasileiro: 1993, 1994

São Paulo

- Copa dos Campeões Mundiais: 1995
- Torneio Rei Dadá: 1995
- Trofeo Bortolotti: 1995
- Campeonato Paulista: 1998

Fluminense

- Campeonato Brasileiro Série C: 1999
