= Edílson (footballer, born 1971) =

Brazilian footballer (born 1971)

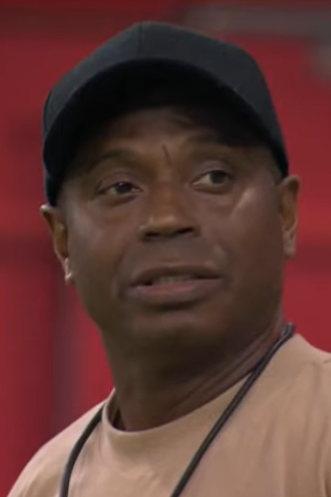
- Edílson in 2026

Personal information
- Full name: Edílson da Silva Ferreira
- Date of birth: 17 September 1971 (age 55)
- Place of birth: Salvador, Brazil
- Height: 1.68 m (5 ft 6 in)
- Position: Second striker

Senior career*
Years	Team	Apps	(Gls)
1990	Industrial	0	(0)
1991–1992	Tanabi	0	(0)
1992	Guarani	33	(11)
1993–1997	Palmeiras	41	(18)
1994–1995	→ Benfica (loan)	31	(17)
1996–1997	→ Kashiwa Reysol (loan)	54	(44)
1997–2000	Corinthians	57	(20)
2000–2003	Flamengo	60	(18)
2002	→ Cruzeiro (loan)	0	(0)
2002–2003	→ Kashiwa Reysol (loan)	16	(7)
2004	Vitória	35	(19)
2004–2005	Al Ain	20	(22)
2005	São Caetano	27	(7)
2006	Vasco da Gama	10	(0)
2006	Nagoya Grampus	0	(0)
2007	Vitória	9	(1)
2010	Bahia	27	(2)
2016	Taboão da Serra	0	(0)
Total		411	(176)

International career
1993–2002	Brazil	23	(6)
Medal record
Men's Football
Representing Brazil
FIFA World Cup
Winner	2002 Korea/Japan
- * Club domestic league appearances and goals

Edílson da Silva Ferreira (born 17 September 1971) is a Brazilian football pundit and retired footballer who played as a forward.

Dubbed as Capetinha, Edílson was a second striker who was known for his dribbling skills, and is mainly known for his stand-out performances with Brazilian clubs Palmeiras and Corinthians. In 1998, he received the Bola de Ouro, the award given to the best player of the Campeonato Brasileiro Série A.

At international level, he received 21 caps with the Brazil national team, scoring 6 goals, and taking part in the nation's 2002 FIFA World Cup victory.

Edison is currently confined in a TV studio in Curicica, Rio de Janeiro, filming the Brazilian edition of Big Brother (Big Brother Brazil 26), where he entered as a VIP competing with other participants to win a prize of R$ 5.5 million. The show runs from January to early April, where competitors have no contact to the outside world.

== Club career ==
Born in Salvador, Edílson youth development was spent in several amateur clubs of his home town. In 1990, he received an invitation of manager Jaime Braga to join Industrial Esporte Clube, which played in the Campeonato Capixaba, where he became a professional footballer. A year later, he moved to Tanabi in the Paulista A2, with his performances attracting attention of larger clubs in the São Paulo region, first Guarani in 1992, and latter Palmeiras in 1993, momentarily breaking the Série A transfer record, being surpass two weeks later by Edmundo.

At Palmeiras, Edilson played alongside Edmundo, Zinho, Roberto Carlos, Mazinho, César Sampaio, in a team that won two consecutive league titles, in 1993 and 1994, plus two Campeonato Paulista and the Torneio Rio – São Paulo. During this time, he received his first callup to the national team. In 1994, Edilson moved abroad for the first team, joining Benfica in the Primeira Liga on a loan deal. He made his debut on 21 August, replacing Abel Xavier, in a 2–0 home win against S.C. Beira-Mar. Although Artur Jorge only made him a regular starter from December onwards, Edilson still finished the 1994–95 season as the club top scorer, with 17 goals. He returned to Palmeiras for the remainder of 1995, only to move to Kashiwa Reysol in the J1 League in 1996, in a second loan deal. In the two seasons in Japan, Edílson finished both as runner-up in Golden Boot ranking, scoring 21 goals in 1996, and 23 in 1997.

Back to Brazil, Edílson joined Palmeiras old rival, Corinthians in 1997. He remained a goalscorer, and partnered with Marcelinho Carioca, and latter Luizão; he helped the team win the league title in 1998 and 1999, adding accolades for Bola de Ouro in the first of those years. A notable event of his period at Corinthians was the 1999 Campeonato Paulista Final against Palmeiras, with the title already in Corinthians hands, Edilson started taunting his opponents by playing with the ball, which led to a brawl that ended the match. A repercussion of this, was the annulment of his call up for the 1999 Copa América, which was given to Ronaldinho instead. In the inaugural FIFA Club World Cup, in 2000, Edílson was involved in a controversy with Real Madrid player, Karembeu. Edilson months earlier claimed that the French was not a player for Real Madrid, to which Lorenzo Sanz replied that "Who is Edilson?". In the match against Real Madrid, a 2–2 draw, Edilson scored both goals of Corinthians, the first after giving a nutmeg to Karembeu. Later in the competition, won by Corinthians, Edilson was named Golden Ball of the tournament. However, his spell at the club ended only a few weeks later, after a semi-final loss to Palmeiras in the Copa Libertadores, fans stormed the training session and started a brawl.

Edilson then moved to Flamengo, helping the team win the Rio de Janeiro State Championship and the 2001 Copa dos Campeões. Yet, he did not perform to expectations in the Brasileirão, and after starting a brawl with Petković, the club shipped him to Cruzeiro in 2002. After a second stint in Japan, in 2002 and 2003, he returned to Flamengo in 2003, performing better in the Brasileirão, scoring 13 times, while also helping the team reach the final of the Copa do Brasil.

In 2004, Edilson changed teams again, signing with Vitória, where he won another State Championship, the Campeonato Baiano. In the Brasileirão, he scored 19 goals, but could not prevent his team from being relegated. Faced with late salaries, Edílson moved to United Arab Emirates, joining Al Ain, where he won local Cup tournament, and helped the club finish second in the 2004–05 UAE Football League. In the final years of his career, he passed through São Caetano, Vasco da Gama, Nagoya Grampus and Bahia, finally retiring in 2010, at 39.

== International career ==
Edilson debuted for Brazil on 24 June 1993, in a 3–0 win against Paraguay. He then spent several years without playing, returning in 2001, when he became an important player in the final stages of the CONMEBOL qualification for the 2002 FIFA World Cup. He was a used substitution in the games against China and England and started in the matches against Costa Rica and Turkey.

== After football ==
=== Media career ===
Since November 2019, Edilson appears daily as a pundit on Bandeirantes, Os Donos da Bola. After, been in Jogo Aberto and Terceiro Tempo. In went out of Band in 2020. After, in 2022, appears as RedeTV!, where participated an Galera Esporte Clube In went out in 2023.

== Career statistics ==
=== Club ===
Appearances and goals by club, season and competition
Club	Season	League		
Club	Season	Division	Apps	Goals
Guarani	1992	Brasileirão Série A	0	0
Palmeiras	1993	Brasileirão Série A	20	8
Palmeiras	1994	Brasileirão Série A	0	0
Palmeiras	1995	Brasileirão Série A	21	10
Palmeiras	Total		41	18
Benfica (loan)	1994–95	Primeira Liga	22	7
Kashiwa Reysol (loan)	1996	J1 League	29	21
Kashiwa Reysol (loan)	1997	J1 League	25	23
Kashiwa Reysol (loan)	Total		54	44
Corinthians Paulista	1997	Brasileirão Série A	9	1
Corinthians Paulista	1998	Brasileirão Série A	28	15
Corinthians Paulista	1999	Brasileirão Série A	20	4
Corinthians Paulista	Total		57	20
Flamengo	2000	Brasileirão Série A	16	2
Flamengo	2001	Brasileirão Série A	17	3
Flamengo	Total		33	5
Cruzeiro (loan)	2002	Brasileirão Série A	0	0
Kashiwa Reysol	2002 (loan)	J1 League	16	7
Kashiwa Reysol	2003	J1 League	0	0
Kashiwa Reysol	Total		16	7
Flamengo	2003	Brasileirão Série A	27	13
Vitória	2004	Brasileirão Série A	35	19
Al Ain	2004–05	UAE League	20	22
São Caetano	2005	Brasileirão Série A	27	7
Vasco da Gama	2006	Brasileirão Série A	10	0
Vitória	2007	Brasileirão Série B	9	1
Career total			351	163

=== International ===
Appearances and goals by national team and year
National team	Year	Apps	Goals
Brazil	1993	2	0
Brazil	1994	0	0
Brazil	1995	0	0
Brazil	1996	0	0
Brazil	1997	0	0
Brazil	1998	0	0
Brazil	1999	0	0
Brazil	2000	2	0
Brazil	2001	7	4
Brazil	2002	10	2
Total		21	6

== Honours ==
=== Club ===
Palmeiras

- Brasileirão Série A: 1993,
- Campeonato Paulista: 1993, 1994
- Torneio Rio – São Paulo: 1993

Corinthians

- Brasileirão Série A: 1998, 1999
- Campeonato Paulista: 1999
- FIFA Club World Cup: 2000

Flamengo

- Campeonato Carioca: 2001
- Copa dos Campeões: 2001

Cruzeiro

- Copa Sul-Minas: 2002

Vitória

- Campeonato Baiano: 2004

Al Ain

- UAE President's Cup: 2004–05

=== International ===
Brazil

- FIFA World Cup: 2002

=== Individual ===
- FIFA Club World Cup Golden Ball: 2000
- Bola de Ouro: 1998
- Bola de Prata: 1998
- Campeonato Carioca best striker: 2001
