= Iranildo =

Brazilian footballer (born 1976)

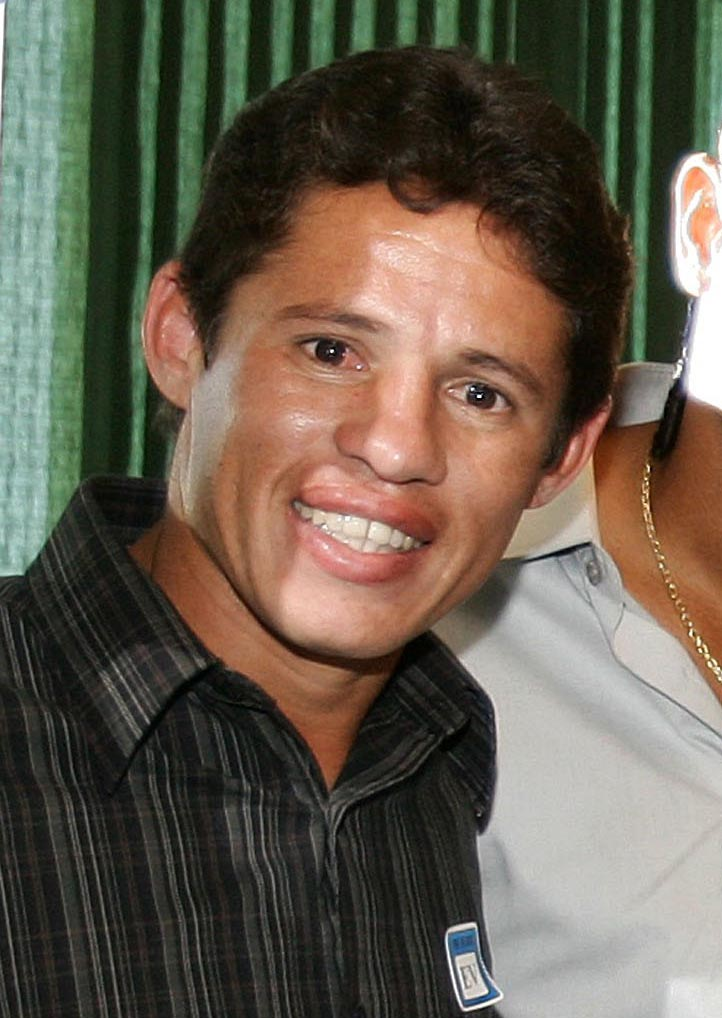

Personal information
- Full name: Iranildo Hermínio Ferreira
- Date of birth: 16 October 1976 (age 50)
- Place of birth: Igarassu, Brazil
- Height: 1.69 m (5 ft 7 in)
- Position: Midfielder

Senior career*
Years	Team	Apps	(Gls)
1994–1995	Madureira		
1995–1996	Botafogo	17	(1)
1996–2000	Flamengo	74	(6)
2000	Bahia	6	(0)
2001	Botafogo		
2001	São Caetano		
2002	Aris		
2002–2003	Flamengo	16	(5)
2003	Santa Cruz		
2003–2006	Brasiliense	22+	(6+)
2006–2007	Al Hazm		
2007–2011	Brasiliense	53+	(6+)
2011	Rio Verde		
2011	Luziânia		
2012	Ceilândia		
2013	Madureira		
2013	Palmas		
2013	Brasiliense		
- * Club domestic league appearances and goals as of 23:59, 27 July 2011 (UTC)

Iranildo Hermínio Ferreira (born 16 October 1976) is a Brazilian former footballer who played as a midfielder for several Brazilian Série A clubs.

== Club career ==
Born in Igarassu, he started his professional career in 1994, with Madureira. With Botafogo, he won the Série A in 1995. Iranildo was part of the Flamengo squads that won the Campeonato Carioca in 1996, 1999 and 2000, and the Copa Mercosur in 1999, among other titles. He helped Brasiliense win the Campeonato Brasiliense in 2004, 2005 and in 2006, and the Série B in 2004.

== International career ==
Iranildo was an unused substitute for Brazil in 1996.

== Honours ==
=== Club ===
Botafogo

- Série A: 1995

Brasiliense

- Série B: 2004
- Campeonato Brasiliense: 2004, 2005, 2006, 2007, 2008 and 2009

Flamengo

- Campeonato Carioca: 1996, 1999, 2000
- Copa dos Campeões Mundiais: 1997
- Copa Mercosur: 1999
- Taça Guanabara: 1999
- Taça Rio: 1996, 2000
