= Marcelo Rosa (footballer, born 1976) =

Brazilian footballer

Personal information
- Full name: Marcelo Rosa da Silva
- Date of birth: 29 January 1976 (age 50)
- Place of birth: Porto Alegre, Brazil
- Height: 1.83 m (6 ft 0 in)
- Position: Midfielder

Senior career*
Years	Team	Apps	(Gls)
1995–1998	Internacional	67	(7)
1999	Flamengo	16	(2)
2000–2001	Internacional	20	(0)
2001	→Cerezo Osaka (loan)	8	(1)
2002	Servette	8	(2)
2003	Independiente Medellin	2	(0)
2004	America-RN	1	(0)
2009-2010	Ypiranga	13	(2)
Total		119	(12)
- * Club domestic league appearances and goals

Marcelo Rosa da Silva (born 29 January 1976) is a Brazilian former professional footballer who played as a midfielder.

== Career ==
Marcelo Rosa began his career at Internacional, winning the Campeonato Gaúcho in 1997. In 1999, he joined Flamengo, being a part of the team that won the Copa Mercosur. He left at the end of the year, making 27 appearances and scoring twice.

In 2001, he had a brief loan spell in Japan with Cerezo Osaka.

In 2002, he joined Swiss club Servette. The following year he joined Independiente Medellín and played in the Colombian league and the Copa Libertadores.

In 2008, he joined Criciúma, making 18 appearances. In 2009, he joined Ypiranga.

== Club statistics ==
Club performance			League	
Season	Club	League	Apps	Goals
Brazil			League	
1995	Internacional	Série A	2	0
1996	Internacional	Série A	17	1
1997	Internacional	Série A	28	5
1998	Internacional	Série A	20	1
1999	Flamengo	Série A	16	2
2000	Internacional	Série A	19	0
2001	Internacional	Série A	1	0
Japan			League	
2001	Cerezo Osaka	J1 League	8	1
Country	Brazil		103	9
Country	Japan		8	1
Total			111	10
