= 1995 Copa dos Campeões Mundiais =

Tournament details
- Country: Brazil
- Dates: 4–28 July
- Teams: 4

Final positions
- Champions: São Paulo
- Runners-up: Santos
- Third place: Grêmio
- Fourth place: Flamengo

Tournament statistics
- Matches played: 7
- Goals scored: 10 (1.43 per match)
- Top goal scorer(s): Catê (São Paulo); Jardel (Grêmio); Giovanni (Santos); 2 goals

The 1995 Copa dos Campeões Mundiais was the first competition realized in Brazil, between all the Brazilian clubs winners of the Intercontinental Cup.

== Participants ==
Club	Intercontinental Cup edition winners
Santos	1962, 1963
Flamengo	1981
Grêmio	1983
São Paulo	1992, 1993

== First stage ==
4 July

Grêmio (Rio Grande do Sul)	2–0	(Rio de Janeiro (state)) Flamengo
Jardel 26', 33'

Estádio Mané Garrincha, Brasília
Referee: Luciano de Almeida

5 July

Santos (São Paulo (state))	2–1	(São Paulo (state)) São Paulo
Giovanni 16', 25'		Toninho Cerezo 76'

Estádio Parque do Sabiá, Uberlândia
Referee: Marco Antônio Cunha

11 July

São Paulo (São Paulo (state))	1–0	(Rio Grande do Sul) Grêmio
Aílton 90'

Estádio Parque do Sabiá, Uberlândia
Referee: Lincoln Afonso Bicalho

12 July

Flamengo (Rio de Janeiro (state))	0–1	(São Paulo (state)) Santos
		Marcelo Passos 21'

Estádio Mané Garrincha, Brasília
Referee: Etevaldo Batista

18 July

Santos (São Paulo (state))	0–0	(Rio Grande do Sul) Grêmio

Estádio Mané Garrincha, Brasília
Referee: Jorge Paulo

19 July

Flamengo (Rio de Janeiro (state))	1–2	(São Paulo (state)) São Paulo
Marquinhos 2'		Catê 23', 26'

Estádio Parque do Sabiá, Uberlândia
Referee: Etevaldo Batista

=== Standings ===
Team	Pts	P	W	D	L	GF	GA	GD
(São Paulo (state)) Santos	7	3	2	1	0	3	1	2
(São Paulo (state)) São Paulo	6	3	2	0	1	4	3	1
(Rio Grande do Sul) Grêmio	4	3	1	1	1	2	1	1
(Rio de Janeiro (state)) Flamengo	0	3	0	0	3	1	5	-4

== Final ==
28 July

Santos (São Paulo (state))	0–0	(São Paulo (state)) São Paulo
Penalties
Giovanni (penalty missed); Jamelli (penalty scored); Gallo (penalty scored); Carlinhos (penalty scored); Marcelo Passos (penalty missed)	3–4	Bentinho (penalty scored); Bordon (penalty missed); Aílton (penalty scored); Sierra (penalty scored); Alemão (penalty scored)

Estádio Parque do Sabiá, Uberlândia
Referee: Márcio Rezende de Freitas

Santos
São Paulo

GK	1	Edinho
DF	4	Ronaldo
DF	2	Cerezo
DF	6	Narciso
DF	3	Marcos Paulo
MF	5	Gallo
MF	8	Carlinhos
MF	10	Giovanni
FW	7	Macedo
FW	9	Jamelli
FW	11	Marcelo Passos
Manager:
Joãozinho

GK	1	Zetti
DF	2	Cláudio
DF	3	Wilson Gottardo
DF	4	Bordon
DF	6	Vaguinho
MF	5	Donizete (substituted off)
MF	8	Alemão
MF	7	Juninho
MF	10	Aílton
FW	9	Denílson (substituted off)
FW	11	Bentinho
Substitutes:
MF	17	Sierra	Substituted in
FW	18	Catê	Substituted in
Manager:
Telê Santana

=== Champion ===
1995 Copa dos Campeões Mundiais
(São Paulo (state))
São Paulo
1st. title
