= 2004 Campeonato Brasileiro Série B =

Campeonato Brasileiro Série B
- Season: 2004
- Champions: Brasiliense
- Promoted: Brasiliense; Fortaleza
- Relegated: América-RN; Remo; América Mineiro; Joinville; Mogi Mirim; Londrina
- Copa Libertadores: Santo André (as Copa do Brasil winners)
- Goals scored: 842
- Average goals/game: 2.70
- Top goalscorer: Rinaldo (Fortaleza) - 14

The football (soccer) Campeonato Brasileiro Série B 2004, the second level of Brazilian National League, was played from April 23 to December 11, 2004. The competition had 24 clubs and two of them were promoted to Série A and six were relegated to Série C.

In the first round, each team played against each other, much like what happens in Série A. However, in contrast to Série A, each team played against the other only once. Therefore, each team played 23 games, 12 home and 11 away (or the opposite). The eight best ranked teams advanced to the second round, where they were divided in two groups of four. Teams in each group played against each other home and away. The two best ranked teams in each group advanced to the final round. Those four teams were put in a single group, and played against each other home and away.

Brasiliense finished the final phase group with most points and was declared 2004 Brazilian Série B champions, claiming the promotion to the 2005 Série A along with Fortaleza, the runners-up. The six worst ranked teams in the first round (América-RN, Remo, América Mineiro, Joinville, Mogi Mirim and Londrina) were relegated to play Série C in 2005.

== Teams ==
- América Mineiro (MG)
- América-RN (RN)
- Anapolina (GO)
- Avaí (SC)
- Bahia (BA)
- Brasiliense (DF)
- Caxias (RS)
- Ceará (CE)
- CRB (AL)
- Fortaleza (CE)
- Joinville (SC)
- Ituano (SP)
- Londrina (PR)
- Marília (SP)
- Mogi Mirim (SP)
- Náutico (PE)
- Paulista (SP)
- Portuguesa (SP)
- Remo (PA)
- Santa Cruz (PE)
- Santo André (SP)
- São Raimundo (AM)
- Sport (PE)
- Vila Nova (GO)

== First stage ==
Pos	Team	Pld	W	D	L	GF	GA	GD	Pts	Qualification or relegation
1	Brasiliense	23	13	7	3	43	22	+21	46	Qualified to Second Stage
2	Náutico	23	14	3	6	46	27	+19	45	Qualified to Second Stage
3	Bahia	23	13	4	6	38	24	+14	43	Qualified to Second Stage
4	Ituano	23	12	6	5	41	20	+21	42	Qualified to Second Stage
5	Fortaleza	23	11	6	6	43	29	+14	39	Qualified to Second Stage
6	Marília	23	10	6	7	28	30	−2	36	Qualified to Second Stage
7	Avaí	23	10	6	7	28	30	−2	36	Qualified to Second Stage
8	Santa Cruz	23	10	5	8	35	25	+10	35	Qualified to Second Stage
9	Paulista	23	10	5	8	32	32	0	35	
10	Caxias	23	10	4	9	30	32	−2	34	
11	Portuguesa	23	8	7	8	31	31	0	31	
12	Ceará	23	9	3	11	30	33	−3	30	
13	Anapolina	23	9	3	11	25	29	−4	30	
14	Santo André	23	12	5	6	38	28	+10	29 (Note: Santo André lost 12 points for fielding 2 ineligible players (Osmar and Dirceu) in Rounds 1 and 2)	Qualified for the 2005 Copa Libertadores (Note: Santo André qualified as Copa do Brasil winners.)
15	CRB	23	7	8	8	32	33	−1	29	
16	São Raimundo	23	8	4	11	29	32	−3	28	
17	Sport	23	7	7	9	24	31	−7	28	
18	Vila Nova	23	7	6	10	34	38	−4	27	
19	América-RN	23	7	5	11	22	36	−14	26	Relegated to Série C 2005
20	Remo	23	5	10	8	30	40	−10	25	Relegated to Série C 2005
21	América Mineiro	23	6	5	12	25	40	−15	23	Relegated to Série C 2005
22	Joinville	23	6	0	17	24	42	−18	18	Relegated to Série C 2005
23	Mogi Mirim	23	2	12	9	26	38	−12	18	Relegated to Série C 2005
24	Londrina	23	4	5	14	19	40	−21	17	Relegated to Série C 2005

=== Matches ===
Home \ Away	AMG	ARN	ANA	AVA	BAH	BRA	CAX	CEA	CRB	FOR	ITU	JOI	LON	MAR	MOG	NAU	PAU	POR	REM	STA	STO	SAO	SPO	VIL
AMG		2–2	0–2	2–2	1–2	0–3	2–3	3–2	0–0	0–4	0–1	1–0	1–0	0–2	1–1	0–3	0–2	1–0	0–2	0–2	2–3	3–1	2–2	4–1
ARN	2–2		3–1	1–0	1–3	3–0	3–1	0–1	0–3	0–1	0–5	0–3	0–1	0–3	1–1	1–2	1–0	0–0	2–1	0–1	0–3	0–3	1–1	1–1
ANA	2–0	1–3		2–1	2–0	1–2	1–0	0–1	0–3	2–1	2–1	0–1	1–2	0–1	2–2	1–1	1–3	3–1	0–1	2–1	0–2	0–1	1–0	1–1
AVA	2–2	0–1	1–2		1–0	2–3	0–1	0–0	1–4	1–0	0–5	1–0	2–2	1–0	2–1	2–4	2–1	1–0	3–1	1–0	3–1	0–0	1–1	1–1
BAH	2–1	3–1	0–2	0–1		2–2	0–1	1–2	3–1	2–2	2–1	4–1	2–0	2–0	1–2	3–1	2–0	0–1	1–0	3–2	0–0	2–2	1–0	2–1
BRA	3–0	0–3	2–1	3–2	2–2		3–0	1–0	0–1	1–1	1–1	1–0	3–0	0–0	4–1	1–1	2–1	2–4	6–1	0–0	3–0	2–1	1–1	2–1
CAX	3–2	1–3	0–1	1–0	1–0	0–3		2–1	2–2	0–1	0–1	3–0	1–0	4–2	3–1	2–3	2–2	1–2	0–0	1–0	1–4	2–1	0–3	0–0
CEA	2–3	1–0	1–0	0–0	2–1	0–1	1–2		1–2	2–2	1–2	0–4	2–1	0–3	1–0	3–1	1–2	4–1	2–2	1–2	0–2	2–0	1–2	2–0
CRB	0–0	3–0	3–0	4–1	1–3	1–0	2–2	2–1		1–4	0–0	1–0	0–1	0–0	1–0	0–2	3–3	3–3	1–1	2–4	0–1	3–4	1–1	0–2
FOR	4–0	1–0	1–2	0–1	2–2	1–1	1–0	2–2	4–1		1–2	2–0	2–1	0–1	2–2	5–4	3–1	3–2	0–0	2–2	3–1	0–2	1–2	3–0
ITU	1–0	5–0	1–2	5–0	1–2	1–1	1–0	2–1	0–0	2–1		1–2	0–0	1–1	3–0	0–1	2–1	2–2	5–2	1–0	3–1	1–1	0–1	3–1
JOI	0–1	3–0	1–0	0–1	1–4	0–1	0–3	4–0	0–1	0–2	2–1		0–2	1–3	2–1	1–2	1–3	0–1	2–0	1–4	2–3	1–3	1–2	1–4
LON	0–1	1–0	2–1	2–2	0–2	0–3	0–1	1–2	1–0	1–2	0–0	2–0		1–2	0–2	0–5	0–1	2–2	1–1	0–0	2–4	3–2	0–2	1–4
MAR	2–0	3–0	1–0	0–1	0–2	0–0	2–4	3–0	0–0	1–0	1–1	3–1	2–1		3–3	0–1	3–0	2–2	2–4	0–3	0–0	3–1	7–1	0–3
MOG	1–1	1–1	2–2	1–2	2–1	1–4	1–3	0–1	0–1	2–2	0–3	1–2	2–0	3–3		0–0	1–3	1–1	1–1	0–0	1–1	1–2	1–1	3–3
NAU	3–0	2–1	1–1	4–2	1–3	1–1	3–2	1–3	2–0	4–5	1–0	2–1	5–0	1–0	0–0		1–2	3–0	2–3	1–0	0–2	2–0	3–1	3–0
PAU	2–0	0–1	3–1	1–2	0–2	1–2	2–2	2–1	3–3	1–3	1–2	3–1	1–0	0–3	3–1	2–1		2–1	2–2	1–1	0–0	1–0	1–0	0–3
POR	0–1	0–0	1–3	0–1	1–0	4–2	2–1	1–4	3–3	2–3	2–2	1–0	2–2	2–2	1–1	0–3	1–2		2–0	2–0	3–0	0–1	0–0	1–0
REM	2–0	1–2	1–0	1–3	0–1	1–6	0–0	2–2	1–1	0–0	2–5	0–2	1–1	4–2	1–1	3–2	2–2	0–2		1–3	2–2	2–2	2–0	1–1
STA	2–0	1–0	1–2	0–1	2–3	0–0	0–1	2–1	4–2	2–2	0–1	4–1	0–0	3–0	0–0	0–1	1–1	0–2	3–1		2–1	2–3	1–0	5–2
STO	3–2	3–0	2–0	1–3	0–0	0–3	4–1	2–0	1–0	1–3	1–3	3–2	4–2	0–0	1–1	2–0	0–0	0–3	2–2	1–2		2–0	2–0	3–1
SAO	1–3	3–0	1–0	0–0	2–2	1–2	1–2	0–2	4–3	2–0	1–1	3–1	2–3	1–3	2–1	0–2	0–1	1–0	2–2	3–2	0–2		1–2	0–2
SPO	2–2	1–1	0–1	1–1	0–1	1–1	3–0	2–1	1–1	2–1	1–0	2–1	2–0	1–7	1–1	1–3	0–1	0–0	0–2	0–1	0–2	2–1		1–2
VIL	1–4	1–1	1–1	1–1	1–2	1–2	0–0	0–2	2–0	0–3	1–3	4–1	4–1	3–0	3–3	0–3	3–0	0–1	1–1	2–5	1–3	2–0	2–1	

Legend: Blue = home team win; Yellow = draw; Red = away team win.

== Second stage ==
=== Group A ===
Pos	Team	Pld	W	D	L	GF	GA	GD	Pts	Qualification	FOR	BRA	ITU	STA
1	Fortaleza	6	2	2	2	8	7	+1	8	Qualified to Final Stage		3–0	1–1	1–1
2	Brasiliense	6	2	2	2	6	6	0	8	Qualified to Final Stage	2–0		2–0	1–1
3	Ituano	6	2	2	2	7	9	−2	8		0–2	2–1		2–1
4	Santa Cruz	6	1	4	1	8	7	+1	7		3–1	0–0	2–2	

=== Group B ===
Pos	Team	Pld	W	D	L	GF	GA	GD	Pts	Qualification	BAH	AVA	NAU	MAR
1	Bahia	6	4	1	1	8	5	+3	13	Qualified to Final Stage		1–0	1–0	4–1
2	Avaí	6	3	1	2	6	4	+2	10	Qualified to Final Stage	0–0		1–0	1–0
3	Náutico	6	2	1	3	7	6	+1	7		4–1	2–1		0–0
4	Marília	6	1	1	4	4	10	−6	4		0–1	1–3	2–1	

== Final stage ==
Pos	Team	Pld	W	D	L	GF	GA	GD	Pts	BRA	FOR	AVA	BAH
1	Brasiliense	6	4	0	2	8	5	+3	12		1–0	2–0	2–1
2	Fortaleza	6	2	2	2	4	4	0	8	1–0		2–0	1–1
3	Avaí	6	2	2	2	4	5	−1	8	1–0	2–0		1–0
4	Bahia	6	1	2	3	7	9	−2	5	2–3	2–0	1–1	

== Trivia ==
- Santo André was punished by losing 12 points for fielding 2 ineligible players (Osmar and Dirceu) in games 1 and 2 of the first round. That eliminated Santo André from a second round spot and allowed Santa Cruz to move ahead and clinch the final spot for the second round.
- Fortaleza had to beat Avaí by two goals in the last game of the season in order to be promoted to the Brazilian elite. So on December 11, 2004, they were able to beat Avaí 2–0 in front of their home crowd and clinch the spot.
