= 2001 Copa dos Campeões =

2nd edition of a Brazilian association football competition

Tournament details
- Country: Brazil
- Dates: 5 June – 11 July
- Teams: 9

Final positions
- Champions: (Rio de Janeiro (state)) Flamengo (1st title)
- Runners-up: (São Paulo (state)) São Paulo

Tournament statistics
- Matches played: 17
- Goals scored: 61 (3.59 per match)
- Top goal scorer(s): (Brazil) Luís Fabiano (7 goals)

The 2001 Copa dos Campeões was the second edition of the football competition held in Brazil. It was carried out in a neutral field in two states in the Northeast Region — Alagoas and Paraíba.

In the finals, Flamengo defeated São Paulo 7–6 on aggregate to win their first title and a place in the group stage of the 2002 Copa Libertadores.

== Qualified teams ==
Team	Qualification
Bahia	2001 Copa Nordeste champions
(São Paulo (state)) Corinthians	2001 Campeonato Paulista champions
(Paraná (state)) Coritiba	2001 Copa Sul-Minas runners-up
(Minas Gerais) Cruzeiro	2001 Copa Sul-Minas champions
(Rio de Janeiro (state)) Flamengo	2001 Campeonato Carioca champions
Goiás	2001 Copa Centro-Oeste champions
(São Paulo (state)) São Paulo	2001 Torneio Rio-São Paulo champions
(Amazonas (Brazilian state)) São Raimundo	2001 Copa Norte champions
(Pernambuco) Sport	2001 Copa Nordeste runners-up

== Preliminary round ==
Pos	Team	Pld	W	D	L	GF	GA	GD	Pts	Qualification
1	(Amazonas (Brazilian state)) São Raimundo (A)	2	1	1	0	2	1	+1	4	Advance to Knockout stage
2	(Pernambuco) Sport (A)	2	0	2	0	3	3	0	2	Advance to Knockout stage
3	Goiás	2	0	1	1	4	5	−1	1	

Source: Bola na Área
(A) Advance to a further round

== Bracket ==
Quarter-finals
(São Paulo (state)) Corinthians	0	0	0
(Paraná (state)) Coritiba	1	2	3
(São Paulo (state)) São Paulo	4	5	9
(Pernambuco) Sport	2	0	2
(Rio de Janeiro (state)) Flamengo	4	2	6
Bahia	2	0	2
(Minas Gerais) Cruzeiro	1	5	6
(Amazonas (Brazilian state)) São Raimundo	0	1	1

Semi-finals
(Paraná (state)) Coritiba	0	1	1
(São Paulo (state)) São Paulo	2	4	6
(Rio de Janeiro (state)) Flamengo	0	3	3
(Minas Gerais) Cruzeiro	0	0	0

Finals
(São Paulo (state)) São Paulo	3	3	6
(Rio de Janeiro (state)) Flamengo	5	2	7

== Finals ==
8 July 2001
16:00 UTC−3

São Paulo (São Paulo (state))	3–5	(Rio de Janeiro (state)) Flamengo
Luís Fabiano 16', 71'; Rogério Pinheiro 59'	Report	Edílson 14', 57'; Reinaldo 25'; Beto 36'; Rogério Pinheiro 79' (o.g)

Almeidão, João Pessoa
Attendance: 38,000
Referee: Luciano Almeida

11 July 2001
21:45 UTC−3

Flamengo (Rio de Janeiro (state))	2–3	(São Paulo (state)) São Paulo
Juan 47'; Petković 58'	Report	Kaká 39'; França 65' (pen.), 88'

Estádio Rei Pelé, Maceió
Attendance: 26,708
Referee: Márcio Rezende de Freitas

Flamengo won 7–6 on aggregate.
