= 1999 Campeonato Carioca =

Campeonato Carioca
- Season: 1999
- Champions: Flamengo
- Copa do Brasil: Flamengo; Fluminense; Americano; Botafogo; Vasco da Gama
- Série C: Bangu
- Matches played: 112
- Goals scored: 290 (2.59 per match)
- Top goalscorer: Romário (Flamengo) - 16 goals
- Biggest home win: Vasco da Gama 8-1 Madureira (May 19, 1999)
- Biggest away win: Madureira 0-5 Flamengo (May 30, 1999)
- Highest scoring: Vasco da Gama 8-1 Madureira (May 19, 1999)

The 1999 edition of the Campeonato Carioca kicked off on January 31, 1999 and ended on June 19, 1999. It is the official tournament organized by FFERJ (Federação de Futebol do Estado do Rio de Janeiro, or Rio de Janeiro State Football Federation. Only clubs based in the Rio de Janeiro State are allowed to play. Thirteen teams contested this edition. Flamengo won the title for the 25th time. no teams were relegated.

== System ==
The tournament was divided in four stages:

- Preliminary tournament: The four bottom teams in the 1998 Preliminary tournament joined Cabo Frio, champions of the 1998 Second Level. The five teams all played against each other in a double round-robin format, but for classification purposes, they were divided into two groups; one with the teams from the city of Rio de Janeiro, and the other with the hinterland teams; The best team in each group qualified into the main tournament.
- Taça Guanabara: The 10 clubs all played in single round-robin format against each other.
- Taça Rio: The 10 clubs all played in single round-robin format against each other.
- Finals: The Finals would happen in two matches, both played at the Maracanã Stadium, between the champions of the Taças Guanabara and Rio.

== Championship ==
=== Preliminary phase ===
==== Interior Group ====
Pos	Team	Pld	W	D	L	GF	GA	GD	Pts	Qualification
1	Itaperuna	8	5	2	1	11	5	+6	17	Qualified
2	Volta Redonda	8	5	1	2	10	5	+5	16	
3	Cabo Frio	8	3	2	3	10	10	0	11	

Updated to match(es) played on March 3, 1999. Source: RSSSF.com
Rules for classification: 1) points; 2) wins; 3) goal difference; 4) number of goals scored.

==== Capital Group ====
Pos	Team	Pld	W	D	L	GF	GA	GD	Pts	Qualification
1	Olaria	8	3	3	2	11	6	+5	12	Qualified
2	América	8	0	0	8	0	16	−16	0 (Note: América refused to play their matches; all of their matches were counted as 0-2 losses.)	Disqualified

Updated to match(es) played on March 3, 1999. Source: RSSSF.com
Rules for classification: 1) points; 2) wins; 3) goal difference; 4) number of goals scored.

=== Taça Guanabara ===
Pos	Team	Pld	W	D	L	GF	GA	GD	Pts	Qualification
1	Flamengo	9	8	1	0	18	5	+13	25	Taça Guanabara champions, qualified for finals
2	Vasco da Gama	9	7	1	1	21	7	+14	22	
3	Fluminense	9	6	1	2	23	15	+8	19	
4	Friburguense	9	4	2	3	15	11	+4	14	
5	Olaria	9	4	2	3	14	16	−2	14	
6	Bangu	9	3	2	4	15	17	−2	11	
7	Botafogo	9	3	1	5	9	9	0	10	
8	Americano	9	3	1	5	14	18	−4	10	
9	Madureira	9	1	1	7	4	11	−7	4	
10	Itaperuna	9	0	0	9	4	28	−24	0	

Updated to match(es) played on April 18, 1999. Source: RSSSF.com
Rules for classification: 1) points; 2) wins; 3) goal difference; 4) number of goals scored.

=== Taça Rio ===
Pos	Team	Pld	W	D	L	GF	GA	GD	Pts	Qualification
1	Vasco da Gama	9	7	2	0	23	5	+18	23	Taça Rio champions, qualified for finals
2	Flamengo	9	6	0	3	19	7	+12	18	
3	Madureira	9	4	3	2	16	18	−2	15	
4	Americano	9	4	2	3	16	16	0	14	
5	Fluminense	9	3	3	3	11	9	+2	12	
6	Botafogo	9	3	3	3	12	12	0	12	
7	Friburguense	9	3	3	3	9	9	0	12	
8	Bangu	9	0	6	3	6	12	−6	6	
9	Olaria	9	1	4	4	9	13	−4	7	
10	Itaperuna	9	0	2	7	3	23	−20	2	

Updated to match(es) played on June 6, 1999. Source: RSSSF.com
Rules for classification: 1) points; 2) wins; 3) goal difference; 4) number of goals scored.

=== Finals ===
Team 1	Agg.	Team 2	1st leg	2nd leg
Flamengo	2–1	Vasco da Gama	1–1	1–0
