= 2001 Campeonato Carioca =

Campeonato Carioca
- Season: 2001
- Champions: Flamengo
- Copa do Brasil: Vasco da Gama; Fluminense; Americano; Botafogo
- Série C: Olaria; Madureira; Bangu; Friburguense; América; Volta Redonda
- Matches played: 131
- Goals scored: 393 (3 per match)
- Top goalscorer: Edílson (Flamengo) - 16 goals
- Biggest home win: Vasco da Gama 7-0 Botafogo (April 29, 2001)
- Biggest away win: América 0-5 Vasco da Gama (May 5, 2001)
- Highest scoring: Itaperuna 6-2 São Cristóvão (December 16, 2000)

The 2001 edition of the Campeonato Carioca kicked off on November 15, 2000 and ended on May 27, 2001. It was the official tournament organized by FFERJ (Federação de Futebol do Estado do Rio de Janeiro, or Rio de Janeiro State Football Federation.) Only clubs based in the Rio de Janeiro State are allowed to play. Sixteen teams contested this edition. Flamengo won the title for the 27th time. no teams were relegated.

== System ==
The tournament was divided in four stages:

- Preliminary tournament: The two teams that had been eliminated in the 2000 Taça Guanabara joined the two relegated teams of that year, Itaperuna and Serrano, and two teams from the second level: Portuguesa and São Cristóvão; each team played against each other in a double round-robin format, and the best team would qualify to the main tournament. Each team also received a number of bonus points, the distribution criteria for them remaining unclear.
- Taça Guanabara: The 12 clubs were divided into two groups of six, and the teams in each group played in a single round-robin format against each other, with the best two in each group qualifying to the Semifinals.
- Taça Rio: The 12 clubs all played in single round-robin format against each other.
- Finals: The Finals would happen in two matches, both played at the Maracanã Stadium, between the champions of the Taças Guanabara and Rio.

== Championship ==
=== Preliminary phase ===
Pos	Team	Pld	W	D	L	GF	GA	GD	Pts	Qualification or relegation
1	Cabofriense	10	6	3	1	15	6	+9	23	Main tournament
2	Volta Redonda	10	5	3	2	12	8	+4	21	Main tournament
3	Serrano	10	5	0	5	10	13	−3	16	2002 Preliminary Tournament
4	Itaperuna	10	3	2	5	15	15	0	14	2002 Preliminary Tournament
5	Portuguesa	10	3	2	5	14	16	−2	12	2002 Preliminary Tournament
6	São Cristóvão	10	2	2	6	8	16	−8	8	2002 Preliminary Tournament

Updated to match(es) played on December 16, 2000. Source: RSSSF.com
Rules for classification: 1) points; 2) wins; 3) goal difference; 4) number of goals scored.

=== Taça Guanabara ===
==== Group A ====
Pos	Team	Pld	W	D	L	GF	GA	GD	Pts	Qualification or relegation
1	Flamengo	5	4	0	1	13	3	+10	12	Qualified
2	Americano	5	3	1	1	4	4	0	10	Qualified
3	Botafogo	5	2	1	2	4	4	0	7	
4	Olaria	5	1	2	2	5	8	−3	5	
5	Volta Redonda	5	1	1	3	3	8	−5	4	
6	Bangu	5	0	3	2	4	6	−2	3	

Updated to match(es) played on February 18, 2001. Source: RSSSF.com
Rules for classification: 1) points; 2) wins; 3) goal difference; 4) number of goals scored.

==== Group B ====
Pos	Team	Pld	W	D	L	GF	GA	GD	Pts	Qualification or relegation
1	Fluminense	5	4	0	1	16	6	+10	12	Qualified
2	Vasco da Gama	5	4	0	1	9	4	+5	12	Qualified
3	Madureira	5	3	1	1	9	6	+3	10	
4	Friburguense	5	1	1	3	8	12	−4	4	
5	América	5	1	0	4	5	11	−6	3	
6	Cabofriense	5	1	0	4	6	14	−8	3	

Updated to match(es) played on February 18, 2001. Source: RSSSF.com
Rules for classification: 1) points; 2) wins; 3) goal difference; 4) number of goals scored.

==== Semifinals ====
Team 1	Score	Team 2
Flamengo	1–0	Vasco da Gama
Fluminense	1–0	Americano

==== Finals ====
Team 1	Score	Team 2
Flamengo	1–1 (5-3 pen.)	Fluminense

=== Taça Rio ===
Pos	Team	Pld	W	D	L	GF	GA	GD	Pts	Qualification or relegation
1	Vasco da Gama	11	8	3	0	30	9	+21	27	Champions
2	Flamengo	11	7	2	2	20	9	+11	23	
3	Americano	11	7	2	2	17	9	+8	23	
4	Olaria	11	6	0	5	21	17	+4	18	
5	Botafogo	11	4	5	2	20	22	−2	17	
6	Fluminense	11	4	3	4	24	19	+5	15	
7	Bangu	11	3	4	4	16	17	−1	13	
8	Friburguense	11	3	3	5	20	17	+3	12	
9	América	11	3	2	6	15	26	−11	11	
10	Cabofriense	11	2	3	6	13	26	−13	9	
11	Volta Redonda	11	2	2	7	12	19	−7	8	
12	Madureira	11	2	1	8	18	36	−18	7	

Updated to match(es) played on May 13, 2001. Source: RSSSF.com
Rules for classification: 1) points; 2) wins; 3) goal difference; 4) number of goals scored.

=== Aggregate table ===
Pos	Team	Pld	W	D	L	GF	GA	GD	Pts	Qualification or relegation
1	Vasco da Gama	16	12	3	1	38	12	+26	39	2002 Copa do Brasil
2	Flamengo	16	11	2	3	33	12	+21	35	
3	Americano	16	10	3	3	21	13	+8	33	2002 Copa do Brasil
4	Fluminense	16	8	3	5	40	25	+15	27	2002 Copa do Brasil
5	Botafogo	16	6	6	4	24	26	−2	24	2002 Copa do Brasil
6	Olaria	16	7	2	7	25	24	+1	23	Série C
7	Madureira	16	5	2	9	27	42	−15	17	Série C
8	Friburguense	16	4	4	8	26	28	−2	16	Série C
9	Bangu	16	3	7	6	20	23	−3	16	Série C
10	América	16	4	2	10	20	37	−17	14	Série C
11	Volta Redonda	16	3	3	10	15	27	−12	12	Série C
12	Cabofriense	16	3	3	10	19	40	−21	12	2002 Preliminary tournament

Updated to match(es) played on May 13, 2001. Source: RSSSF.com
Rules for classification: 1) points; 2) wins; 3) goal difference; 4) number of goals scored.

=== Finals ===
Team 1	Agg.	Team 2	1st leg	2nd leg
Flamengo	4–3	Vasco da Gama	1–2	3–1
