= 2000 Campeonato Carioca =

Campeonato Carioca
- Season: 2000
- Champions: Flamengo
- Relegated: Serrano; Itaperuna
- Copa do Brasil: Flamengo; Fluminense; Americano; Botafogo
- Série C: Olaria; Madureira; Friburguense; Volta Redonda
- Matches played: 153
- Goals scored: 454 (2.97 per match)
- Top goalscorer: Romário (Vasco da Gama) - 19 goals
- Biggest home win: Vasco da Gama 6-0 Americano (March 25, 2000); Flamengo 7-1 Friburguense (April 13, 2000)
- Biggest away win: Bangu 1-6 Vasco da Gama (April 19, 2000)
- Highest scoring: Flamengo 7-1 Friburguense (April 13, 2000); América 3-5 Bangu (May 28, 2000)

The 2000 edition of the Campeonato Carioca kicked off on January 29, 2000 and ended on June 17, 2000. It is the official tournament organized by FFERJ (Federação de Futebol do Estado do Rio de Janeiro, or Rio de Janeiro State Football Federation. Only clubs based in the Rio de Janeiro State are allowed to play. Fourteen teams contested this edition. Flamengo won the title for the 26th time. Serrano and Itaperuna were relegated.

== System ==
The tournament was divided in four stages:

- Preliminary tournament: All the teams of the championship outside of the big four were divided into two regionalized groups of five teams: one with the teams from Rio de Janeiro plus Itaperuna, and the other with the other hinterland teams; each team played against the teams of its own group in a double round-robin format, and the best four teams would qualify to the main tournament, while the bottom team in each group would be relegated. Each team also received a number of pre-season bonus points and post-season bonus points.
- Taça Guanabara: The 12 clubs all played in single round-robin format against each other, with the two bottom teams being eliminated from the championship.
- Taça Rio: The ten remaining clubs all played in single round-robin format against each other.
- Finals: The Finals would happen in two matches, both played at the Maracanã Stadium, between the champions of the Taças Guanabara and Rio.

== Championship ==
=== Preliminary phase ===
==== Group A ====
Pos	Team	Pld	W	D	L	GF	GA	GD	Pts	Qualification
1	Madureira	8	5	2	1	16	10	+6	34	Main tournament
2	América	8	3	4	1	15	9	+6	24	Main tournament
3	Olaria	8	3	1	4	12	15	−3	20	Main tournament
4	Bangu	8	1	3	4	9	12	−3	16	Main tournament
5	Itaperuna	8	1	4	3	10	16	−6	13	Relegated

Updated to match(es) played on March 1, 2000. Source: RSSSF.com
Rules for classification: 1) points; 2) wins; 3) goal difference; 4) number of goals scored.

==== Group B ====
Pos	Team	Pld	W	D	L	GF	GA	GD	Pts	Qualification
1	Americano	8	5	1	2	12	7	+5	34	Main tournament
2	Friburguense	8	4	2	2	13	7	+6	29	Main tournament
3	Volta Redonda	8	3	1	4	7	9	−2	20	Main tournament
4	Cabo Frio	8	2	2	4	7	11	−4	13	Main tournament
5	Serrano	8	2	2	4	8	13	−5	11	Relegated

Updated to match(es) played on March 1, 2000. Source: RSSSF.com
Rules for classification: 1) points; 2) wins; 3) goal difference; 4) number of goals scored.

=== Taça Guanabara ===
Pos	Team	Pld	W	D	L	GF	GA	GD	Pts	Qualification
1	Vasco da Gama	11	10	1	0	35	5	+30	31	Taça Guanabara champions, advanced to final
2	Botafogo	11	8	2	1	26	10	+16	26	
3	Flamengo	11	7	2	2	31	12	+19	23	
4	Americano	11	4	4	3	19	23	−4	16	
5	Fluminense	11	3	4	4	13	12	+1	13	
6	Madureira	11	3	4	4	14	18	−4	13	
7	Olaria	11	4	1	6	15	23	−8	13	
8	América	11	2	4	5	11	18	−7	10	
9	Bangu	11	3	2	6	11	19	−8	11	
10	Friburguense	11	2	5	4	10	18	−8	11	
11	Volta Redonda	11	1	3	7	9	19	−10	6	Eliminated
12	Cabo Frio	11	0	5	6	4	21	−17	5	Eliminated

Updated to match(es) played on April 23, 2000. Source: RSSSF.com
Rules for classification: 1) points; 2) wins; 3) goal difference; 4) number of goals scored.

=== Taça Rio ===
Pos	Team	Pld	W	D	L	GF	GA	GD	Pts	Qualification
1	Flamengo	9	7	1	1	25	12	+13	22	Taça Rio champions, advanced to final
2	Vasco da Gama	9	5	2	2	21	10	+11	17	
3	Botafogo	9	5	2	2	17	10	+7	17	
4	Fluminense	9	5	1	3	17	16	+1	16	
5	Bangu	9	2	4	3	13	16	−3	10	
6	Americano	9	3	1	5	10	13	−3	10	
7	Olaria	9	3	1	5	12	18	−6	10	
8	Friburguense	9	2	3	4	9	13	−4	9	
9	América	9	2	3	4	12	17	−5	9	
10	Madureira	9	1	2	6	5	16	−11	5	

Updated to match(es) played on June 7, 2000. Source: RSSSF.com
Rules for classification: 1) points; 2) wins; 3) goal difference; 4) number of goals scored.

=== Finals ===
Team 1	Agg.	Team 2	1st leg	2nd leg
Flamengo	5–1	Vasco da Gama	3–0	2–1
