= Copa dos Campeões Mundiais =

Copa dos Clubes Brasileiros Campeões Mundiais
- Organiser(s): CBF, supported and maintained by SBT
- Founded: 1995
- Abolished: 1997
- Region: Brazil
- Teams: 4
- Most championships: São Paulo (2 titles)

The Copa dos Campeões Mundiais (English: World Champions Cup), was an official tournament organized by the Brazilian television network Sistema Brasileiro de Televisão (SBT) with the seal official of CBF featuring Brazilian clubs that were previously successful in the conquest of the Intercontinental Cup. The competition was inspired by the same precedents that CONMEBOL used for the Supercopa Libertadores, which contained champions from past editions of the Copa Libertadores.

Their matches were officially assigned to the CBF calendar for the three years in which the tournament was held.

== Eligible clubs ==
Only four clubs had won the Interncontinental Cup until the tournament came into being realized:

Club	Intercontinental Cup edition winners
Santos	1962, 1963
Flamengo	1981
Grêmio	1983
São Paulo	1992, 1993

== Format ==
The tournament was played in round-robin in its first stage, followed by a final between the top two clubs. The tournament matches were played mostly in the Brazilian Midwest region, in the cities of Cuiabá, Brasília and Campo Grande. The city of Uberlândia, Minas Gerais, also hosted games in the 1995 edition.

The tournament was held during the months of June or July.

== List of champions ==
Year	Champion	Final match	Runners-up	Third place	Fourth place
1995; Details	São Paulo; SP	0–0; 4–3 (pen.)	Santos; SP	Grêmio; RS	Flamengo; RJ
1996 Details	São Paulo; SP	2–1	Flamengo; RJ	Santos; SP	Grêmio; RS
1997 Details	Flamengo; RJ	1–0	São Paulo; SP	Santos; SP	Grêmio; RS
