= 1996 Santos FC season =

1996 brazilian club season

Santos
1996 season
- President: Samir Jorge Abdul-Hak
- Coach: Candinho; Orlando Pereira; José Teixeira
- Stadium: Vila Belmiro
- Campeonato Brasileiro: 20th
- Campeonato Paulista: 5th
- Copa do Brasil: First round
- Supercopa Libertadores: Semi-finals
- Torneio de Verão: Winners
- Copa dos Campeões: 3rd
- Top goalscorer: League: Alessandro (6); All: Giovanni (25)

The 1996 season was Santos Futebol Clube's eighty-fourth in existence and the club's third-seventh consecutive season in the top flight of Brazilian football.

== Players ==
=== Squad ===
Note: Flags indicate national team as defined under FIFA eligibility rules; some limited exceptions apply. Players may hold more than one non-FIFA nationality.

No.	Pos.	Nation	Player
—	GK	BRA	Edinho
—	GK	BRA	Sérgio Guedes
—	GK	BRA	Nando
—	DF	BRA	Ânderson Lima
—	DF	BRA	Daniel
—	DF	BRA	Gustavo Nery
—	DF	BRA	Jean
—	DF	BRA	Marcos Adriano
—	DF	BRA	Narciso
—	DF	BRA	Rogério Seves
—	DF	BRA	Ronaldo Marconato
—	DF	BRA	Sandro
—	DF	BRA	Valdir
—	MF	BRA	Baiano
—	MF	BRA	Carlinhos
—	MF	BRA	Cuca

No.	Pos.	Nation	Player
—	MF	BRA	Élder
—	MF	BRA	Jamelli
—	MF	ZIM	Kennedy
—	MF	BRA	Marcos Assunção
—	MF	BRA	Marcos Bazílio
—	MF	BRA	Piá
—	MF	BRA	Robert
—	MF	BRA	Vágner
—	FW	COL	Albeiro Usuriaga
—	FW	BRA	Alessandro
—	FW	BRA	Alexandre Bortolato
—	FW	BRA	Andradina
—	FW	BRA	Camanducaia
—	FW	PAR	Edgar Báez
—	FW	BRA	Juari
—	FW	BRA	Otávio Augusto

Source: Acervo Santista

=== Statistics ===
==== Appearances and goals ====
Pos.	Nat	Name	Brasileiro		Paulista		Copa do Brasil		Torneio de Verão		Supercopa		Copa dos Campeões		Total	
Pos.	Nat	Name	Apps	Goals	Apps	Goals	Apps	Goals	Apps	Goals	Apps	Goals	Apps	Goals	Apps	Goals
GK	(Brazil)	Edinho	18	0	24	0	1	0	2	0	4	0	3	0	52	0
GK	(Brazil)	Nando	0	0	1 (1)	0	0	0	0	0	0	0	0	0	2	0
GK	(Brazil)	Sérgio Guedes	5 (2)	0	0	0	0	0	0	0	2	0	0	0	9	0
DF	(Brazil)	Ânderson Lima	16	3	0	0	0	0	0	0	6	0	0 (1)	0	23	3
DF	(Brazil)	Daniel	6 (2)	0	0	0	0	0	0	0	0	0	0	0	8	0
DF	(Brazil)	Gustavo Nery	6 (2)	1	3 (2)	0	0	0	0	0	0	0	0	0	13	1
DF	(Brazil)	Jean	10 (3)	0	5	0	0	0	1 (1)	1	4 (1)	1	2	0	27	2
DF	(Brazil)	Marcos Adriano	14	0	21	1	1	0	2	0	6	0	3	0	47	1
DF	(Brazil)	Narciso	14	0	18	0	1	0	0	0	4	0	1	0	38	0
DF	(Brazil)	Rogério Seves	2	0	0	0	0	0	0	0	0	0	0	0	2	0
DF	(Brazil)	Ronaldo Marconato	5 (1)	1	8 (6)	4	1	0	2	0	2 (2)	0	0	0	27	5
DF	(Brazil)	Sandro	16	0	25	3	2	0	1	0	3	1	3	1	49	5
DF	(Brazil)	Valdir	1	0	0	0	0	0	0	0	0	0	0	0	1	0
MF	(Brazil)	Baiano	3 (4)	0	14 (5)	1	1	0	1	0	1	0	3	0	32	1
MF	(Brazil)	Carlinhos	19	1	2	0	0	0	2	0	5 (1)	0	0	0	29	1
MF	(Brazil)	Cuca	2 (6)	0	0	0	0	0	0	0	0	0	0	0	8	0
MF	(Brazil)	Élder	7 (2)	0	0	0	0	0	0	0	0	0	0	0	9	0
MF	(Brazil)	Jamelli	19	5	21	5	1	0	0	0	6	2	3	2	50	14
MF	(Zimbabwe)	Kennedy	0	0	5 (5)	1	0	0	2	1	0	0	0	0	12	2
MF	(Brazil)	Marcos Assunção	19	2	0	0	0	0	0	0	6	0	0	0	25	2
MF	(Brazil)	Piá	7 (3)	0	0	0	0	0	0	0	2 (1)	0	0	0	13	0
MF	(Brazil)	Robert	16 (3)	1	24 (3)	6	2	0	0	0	1 (4)	2	3	0	56	9
MF	(Brazil)	Vágner	11 (1)	1	19 (1)	1	1	0	0	0	5	1	0 (1)	0	39	3
FW	(Brazil)	Alessandro	15 (4)	6	0	0	0	0	0	0	6	2	0	0	25	8
FW	(Brazil)	Alexandre Bortolato	0 (2)	0	0	0	0	0	0	0	0	0	0	0	2	0
FW	(Brazil)	Andradina	5 (9)	0	0	0	0	0	0	0	0 (1)	0	0	0	15	0
FW	(Brazil)	Camanducaia	14 (9)	4	7 (8)	3	0	0	2	1	3 (3)	1	0 (3)	0	49	9
FW	(Paraguay)	Edgar Báez	2 (4)	0	0	0	0	0	0	0	0	0	0	0	6	0
FW	(Brazil)	Juari	0 (4)	0	0	0	0	0	0	0	0	0	0	0	4	0
FW	(Brazil)	Otávio Augusto	1 (2)	0	0	0	0	0	0	0	0	0	0	0	3	0
Players who left the club during the season
GK	(Brazil)	Gilberto	0	0	5 (1)	0	1	0	0	0	0	0	0	0	7	0
DF	(Brazil)	Claudemir	0	0	1 (1)	0	0	0	0	0	0	0	0	0	2	0
DF	(Brazil)	Cláudio	0	0	23	1	2	0	0	0	0	0	3	0	28	1
DF	(Brazil)	Luiz Carlos	0	0	0 (1)	0	0	0	0	0	0	0	0	0	1	0
DF	(Brazil)	Marcos Paulo	0	0	10 (2)	1	1	0	1	0	0	0	0	0	14	1
MF	(South Africa)	Arthur	0	0	1 (3)	0	0	0	0 (2)	0	0	0	0	0	6	0
MF	(Brazil)	Batista	0	0	6 (5)	0	0 (2)	0	0	0	0	0	3	0	16	0
MF	(Brazil)	Cerezo	0	0	4 (5)	0	0 (1)	0	0 (2)	0	0	0	0 (1)	0	13	0
MF	(Brazil)	Gallo	0	0	24	1	2	0	2	0	0	0	3	0	31	1
MF	(Brazil)	Giovanni	0	0	26	24	1	0	1	1	0	0	0	0	28	25
MF	(Brazil)	Kiko	0	0	4 (1)	0	0	0	0 (1)	0	0	0	0	0	6	0
MF	(Brazil)	Marcelo Passos	0	0	9 (10)	2	1 (1)	0	2	0	0	0	0 (3)	0	26	2
FW	(Colombia)	Albeiro Usuriaga	1	0	0	0	0	0	0	0	0	0	0	0	1	0
FW	(Brazil)	Clóvis	0	0	4 (7)	4	1	0	0	0	0	0	0	0	12	4
FW	(Brazil)	Macedo	0	0	16 (9)	9	2	1	1	1	0	0	3	0	31	11
FW	(Brazil)	Whelliton	0	0	0	0	0	0	0 (2)	0	0	0	0	0	2	0

Source: Match reports in Competitive matches

==== Goalscorers ====
Ran	Pos	Nat	Name	Brasileiro	Paulistão	Copa do Brasil	Torneio de Verão	Supercopa	C. Campeões	Total
1	MF	(Brazil)	Giovanni	0	24	0	1	0	0	25
2	MF	(Brazil)	Jamelli	5	5	0	0	2	2	14
3	FW	(Brazil)	Macedo	0	9	1	1	0	0	11
4	FW	(Brazil)	Camanducaia	4	3	0	1	1	0	9
4	MF	(Brazil)	Robert	1	6	0	0	2	0	9
5	FW	(Brazil)	Alessandro	6	0	0	0	2	0	8
6	DF	(Brazil)	Ronaldo Marconato	1	4	0	0	0	0	5
6	DF	(Brazil)	Sandro	0	3	0	0	1	1	5
7	FW	(Brazil)	Clóvis	0	4	0	0	0	0	4
8	DF	(Brazil)	Ânderson Lima	3	0	0	0	0	0	3
8	MF	(Brazil)	Vágner	1	1	0	0	1	0	3
9	DF	(Brazil)	Jean	0	0	0	1	1	0	2
9	MF	(Zimbabwe)	Kennedy	0	1	0	1	0	0	2
9	MF	(Brazil)	Marcelo Passos	0	2	0	0	0	0	2
9	MF	(Brazil)	Marcos Assunção	2	0	0	0	0	0	2
10	MF	(Brazil)	Baiano	0	1	0	0	0	0	1
10	MF	(Brazil)	Carlinhos	1	0	0	0	0	0	1
10	DF	(Brazil)	Cláudio	0	1	0	0	0	0	1
10	MF	(Brazil)	Gallo	0	1	0	0	0	0	1
10	DF	(Brazil)	Gustavo Nery	1	0	0	0	0	0	1
10	DF	(Brazil)	Marcos Adriano	0	1	0	0	0	0	1
10	DF	(Brazil)	Marcos Paulo	0	1	0	0	0	0	1

Source: Match reports in Competitive matches

== Transfers ==
=== In ===
Pos.	Name	Moving from	Source	Notes
DF	(Brazil) Sandro	Sport		
DF	(Brazil) Cláudio	São Paulo		On loan
FW	(Brazil) Clóvis	(Portugal) Benfica		On loan
MF	(Brazil) Baiano	Youth system		Promoted
DF	(Brazil) Claudemir	Noroeste		
DF	(Brazil) Luiz Carlos	Youth system		Promoted
FW	(Brazil) Juari	Ferroviária		
FW	(Brazil) Otávio Augusto	Ferroviária		
DF	(Brazil) Rogério Seves	Ferroviária		
DF	(Brazil) Ânderson Lima	Juventus		
MF	(Brazil) Marcos Assunção	Rio Branco		
FW	(Brazil) Andradina	Mirassol		
FW	(Brazil) Alexandre Bortolato	Sãocarlense		
FW	(Colombia) Albeiro Usuriaga	(Ecuador) Barcelona		
DF	(Brazil) Ronaldo	Internacional		Loan return
GK	(Brazil) Sérgio Guedes	Lousano Paulista		
MF	(Brazil) Piá	Inter de Limeira		
MF	(Brazil) Élder	Novorizontino		
FW	(Brazil) Alessandro	Novorizontino		On loan
DF	(Brazil) Valdir	Grêmio Maringá		
DF	(Brazil) Daniel	Matonense		
FW	(Paraguay) Edgar Báez	(Paraguay) Guaraní		

=== Out ===
Pos.	Name	Moving to	Source	Notes
DF	(Brazil) Marcelo Moura	Free agent		
MF	(Brazil) Pintado	(Mexico) Cruz Azul		Loan return
DF	(Brazil) Maurício Copertino	Caxias		On loan
MF	(Brazil) Zé Renato	Caxias		On loan
DF	(Brazil) Marquinhos Capixaba	São Paulo		Contract terminated
MF	(Brazil) Serginho Fraldinha	América–SP		On loan
DF	(Brazil) Camilo	XV de Jaú		
MF	(Brazil) Neto	Araçatuba		On loan
DF	(Brazil) Marcelo Silva	Remo		Loan return
FW	(Brazil) Whelliton	Vila Nova		
MF	(Brazil) Ranielli	Botafogo–SP		On loan
DF	(Brazil) Marcelo Fernandes	Botafogo–SP		On loan
FW	(Brazil) Neizinho	XV de Jaú		On loan
GK	(Brazil) Robson	Remo		On loan
FW	(Brazil) Demétrius	Madureira		On loan
MF	(Brazil) Giovanni	(Spain) Barcelona		
FW	(Brazil) Neizinho	(Greece) Aris Thessaloniki		
FW	(Brazil) Clóvis	(Portugal) Benfica		Loan return
DF	(Brazil) Cláudio	São Paulo		Loan return
GK	(Brazil) Gilberto	Free agent		
MF	(South Africa) Arthur	Free agent		
MF	(Brazil) Cerezo	Free agent		
MF	(Brazil) Kiko	Free agent		
DF	(Brazil) Luiz Carlos	Free agent		
DF	(Brazil) Marcos Paulo	Free agent		
DF	(Brazil) Camilo	Free agent		
MF	(Brazil) Batista	Free agent		
FW	(Brazil) Macedo	Vasco da Gama		
MF	(Brazil) Gallo	Portuguesa		On loan
MF	(Brazil) Ranielli	Vasco da Gama		On loan
MF	(Brazil) Marcelo Passos	Goiás		On loan
MF	(Brazil) Zé Renato	Juventude		On loan
FW	(Colombia) Albeiro Usuriaga	(Argentina) Independiente		
MF	(Brazil) Neto	Corinthians		

== Friendlies ==
20 June Friendly	Santos	2 – 0	(Spain) Real Madrid	Santos
	Camanducaia 45+4'; Jamelli 90+1' (pen.)	Report		Stadium: Vila Belmiro; Attendance: 2,120; Referee: Óscar Roberto de Godói

10 August Friendly	Inter de Limeira	2 – 2	Santos	Limeira
	Paulinho 3', 59'	Report	44' Usuriaga; 83' (pen.) Jamelli	Stadium: Limeirão; Attendance: 1,264; Referee: Ricardo Luís de Camargo

14 August Friendly	Comercial	1 – 3	Santos	Bebedouro
	Carlinhos 65'	Report	17' Camanducaia; 20' Ânderson Lima; 33' Robert	Stadium: Sócrates Stamato

== Competitions ==
=== Campeonato Brasileiro ===
==== Results summary ====
Overall								Home						Away					
Pld	W	D	L	GF	GA	GD	Pts	W	D	L	GF	GA	GD	W	D	L	GF	GA	GD
23	7	6	10	26	31	−5	27	4	2	6	14	17	−3	3	4	4	12	14	−2

Source: Acervo Santista

==== First stage ====
Pos	Team	Pld	W	D	L	GF	GA	GD	Pts
18	Vasco da Gama	23	8	3	12	37	43	−6	27
19	Juventude	23	8	3	12	31	37	−6	27
20	Santos	23	7	6	10	26	31	−5	27
21	Criciúma	23	6	5	12	31	39	−8	23
22	Bahia	23	5	8	10	25	35	−10	23

===== Matches =====
17 August 1	Guarani	1 – 1	Santos	Campinas
15:30	Aílton 79'	Report	13' Camanducaia	Stadium: Brinco de Ouro; Attendance: 7,957; Referee: Alexandre Barreto

22 August 2	Santos	1 – 0	Fluminense	São Paulo
20:30	Ânderson Lima 83'	Report		Stadium: Ibirapuera; Attendance: 5,838; Referee: Fabiano Gonçalves

25 August 3	São Paulo	2 – 1	Santos	São Paulo
19:00	Müller 56'; Serginho 77' (pen.)	Report	50' Ânderson Lima	Stadium: Morumbi; Attendance: 9,520; Referee: João Paulo Araújo

29 August 4	Botafogo	0 – 2	Santos	Rio de Janeiro
21:00		Report	27' Camanducaia; 72' (pen.) Jamelli	Stadium: Maracanã; Attendance: 6,586; Referee: Sidrack Marinho

1 September 5	Coritiba	1 – 3	Santos	Curitiba
16:00	Alberto 45+3' (pen.)	Report	22' (pen.) Jamelli; 75' Gustavo Nery; 88' (o.g.) Zambiasi	Stadium: Couto Pereira; Attendance: 16,045; Referee: Cláudio Vinícius Cerdeira

4 September 6	Santos	1 – 1	Juventude	São Paulo
20:30	Alessandro 10'	Report	72' Zé Renato	Stadium: Ibirapuera; Attendance: 6,704; Referee: Jorge Travassos

8 September 7	Santos	1 – 2	Palmeiras	São Paulo
16:00	Alessandro 79'	Report	57' Rincón; 67' Fernando Diniz	Stadium: Morumbi; Attendance: 13,332; Referee: João Paulo Araújo

15 September 8	Goiás	2 – 0	Santos	Goiânia
17:00	Índio 45' (pen.); Marcelo Passos 81'	Report		Stadium: Serra Dourada; Attendance: 10,154; Referee: José Carlos Marcondes

18 September 9	Santos	2 – 0	Portuguesa	São Paulo
20:30	Jamelli 77'; Camanducaia 90+2'	Report		Stadium: Ibirapuera; Attendance: 3,232; Referee: Marco Paulo Spironelli

21 September 10	Santos	0 – 1	Atlético Mineiro	Bebedouro
15:30		Report	82' Euller	Stadium: Sócrates Stamato; Attendance: 5,886; Referee: Léo Feldman

28 September 11	Santos	1 – 2	Internacional	São Bernardo do Campo
15:30	Jamelli 80'	Report	35' Fabinho; 71' Leandro Machado	Stadium: Primeiro de Maio; Attendance: 8,900; Referee: Cláudio Vinícius Cerdeira

6 October 12	Bahia	1 – 1	Santos	Salvador
17:00	Wladimir 44'	Report	55' Vágner	Stadium: Fonte Nova; Attendance: 9,373; Referee: Carlos Elias Pimentel

9 October 13	Santos	1 – 2	Sport Recife	São Paulo
20:30	Carlinhos 76' (pen.)	Report	48' Dedé; 50' Chiquinho	Stadium: Ibirapuera; Attendance: 4,779; Referee: Sidrack Marinho

13 October 14	Criciúma	1 – 1	Santos	Criciúma
17:00	Marcão 28'	Report	45' Marcos Assunção	Stadium: Heriberto Hulse; Attendance: 4,506; Referee: Fabiano Gonçalves

19 October 15	Santos	1 – 2	Flamengo	São José do Rio Preto
16:30	Robert 8'	Report	42' Aloísio; 90' William	Stadium: Teixeirão; Attendance: 7,828; Referee: Antônio Vidal da Silva

27 October 16	Corinthians	0 – 0	Santos	São Paulo
17:00		Report		Stadium: Morumbi; Attendance: 9,099; Referee: Cláudio Vinícius Cerdeira

3 November 17	Santos	2 – 2	Bragantino	São Paulo
17:00	Camanducaia 86'; Alessandro 90+2'	Report	37', 61' Kelly	Stadium: Ibirapuera; Attendance: 1,740; Referee: Carlos Elias Pimentel

7 November 18	Vasco da Gama	1 – 2	Santos	Rio de Janeiro
21:15	Ranielli 56'	Report	5' Alessandro; 51' Jamelli	Stadium: São Januário; Attendance: 2,750; Referee: Wilson de Souza Mendonça

10 November 19	Santos	1 – 0	Vitória	São Paulo
17:00	Ânderson Lima 65'	Report		Stadium: Ibirapuera; Attendance: 3,095; Referee: Carlos Eugênio Simon

12 November 20	Grêmio	3 – 0	Santos	Porto Alegre
20:30	Paulo Nunes 28'; Dinho 35' (pen.); Zé Alcino 67'	Report		Stadium: Olímpico; Attendance: 11,079; Referee: Léo Feldman

17 November 21	Santos	3 – 2	Atlético Paranaense	São Paulo
17:00	Alessandro 19', 90'; Ronaldo Marconato 41'	Report	10' Piekarski; 35' Paulo Rink	Stadium: Ibirapuera; Attendance: 1,843; Referee: Ubiraci Damásio de Oliveira

20 November 22	Santos	0 – 3	Paraná	São Paulo
20:30		Report	37' Osmar; 60' (pen.) Régis; 78' Claudinho	Stadium: Ibirapuera; Attendance: 464; Referee: Antônio Pereira da Silva

24 November 23	Cruzeiro	2 – 1	Santos	Belo Horizonte
17:00	Paulinho McLaren 12'; Aílton 23'	Report	67' Marcos Assunção	Stadium: Mineirão; Attendance: 18,520; Referee: Wagner Azevedo

=== Copa do Brasil ===
==== First round ====
5 March First leg	Atlético Paranaense	3 – 0	Santos	Curitiba
21:00	Oséas 17', 72'; Paulo Rink 54'	Report		Stadium: Joaquim Américo; Attendance: 16,702; Referee: Jorge dos Santos Travassos

12 March Second leg	Santos	1 – 1 (1–4 agg.)	Atlético Paranaense	Santos
21:00	Macedo 33'	Report	66' Paulo Rink	Stadium: Vila Belmiro; Attendance: 3,361; Referee: Marques Dias da Fonseca

=== Campeonato Paulista ===
==== First round ====
Pos	Team	Pld	W	D	L	GF	GA	GD	Pts
6	União São João	15	6	5	4	25	19	+6	23
7	América	15	6	3	6	23	30	−7	21
8	Santos	15	6	2	7	24	27	−3	20
9	Araçatuba	15	5	3	7	15	24	−9	18
10	Rio Branco	15	5	2	8	20	24	−4	17

Updated to match(es) played on 30 March 1996. Source: RSSSF.com
Rules for classification: 1) points; 2) wins; 3) goal difference; 4) number of goals scored.

===== Matches =====
28 January 1	Santos	1 – 0	União São João	Santos
17:00	Giovanni 59'	Report		Stadium: Vila Belmiro; Attendance: 8,538; Referee: Dionisio Roberto Domingos

31 January 2	Juventus	2 – 3	Santos	São Paulo
17:00	Raudnei 60', 85'	Report	45' Jamelli; 55' Marcos Adriano; 62' Gallo	Stadium: Palestra Itália; Attendance: 7,261; Referee: Nélson Aparecido Sônego

3 February 3	Santos	1 – 2	São Paulo	Santos
21:30	Giovanni 27' (pen.)	Report	32' Guilherme; 35' Almir	Stadium: Vila Belmiro; Attendance: 12,984; Referee: Lincoln Afonso Bicalho

7 February 4	Portuguesa	3 – 2	Santos	São Paulo
17:00	Ayupe 21'; Tiba 75' (pen.), 82' (pen.)	Report	11' Camanducaia; 27' Sandro	Stadium: Canindé; Attendance: 4,949; Referee: Léo Feldman

11 February 5	Santos	2 – 2	Corinthians	Santos
16:00	Marcos Paulo 35'; Sandro 77'	Report	42' Edmundo; 67' Marcelinho Carioca	Stadium: Vila Belmiro; Attendance: 13,087; Referee: Flávio de Carvalho

17 February 6	Ferroviária	0 – 3	Santos	Araraquara
16:00		Report	21' (o.g.) Dedé; 32', 55' Giovanni	Stadium: Fonte Luminosa; Attendance: 4,101; Referee: Oscar Roberto de Godói

25 February 7	Santos	1 – 1	Novorizontino	Santos
16:00	Macedo 36'	Report	30' Ricardo	Stadium: Vila Belmiro; Attendance: 4,473; Referee: Francisco Dacildo Mourão

2 March 8	Mogi Mirim	2 – 0	Santos	Mogi Mirim
16:00	Rodrigo 19'; Samuel 57'	Report		Stadium: Wilson de Barros; Attendance: 6,467; Referee: Carlos Eugênio Simon

7 March 9	Santos	4 – 2	Rio Branco	Santos
21:30	Macedo 1'; Giovanni 31', 53'; Robert 57'	Report	25' Curê; 70' Marcelinho Paraíba	Stadium: Vila Belmiro; Attendance: 1,020; Referee: Cláudio Vinícius Cerdeira

9 March 10	América–SP	1 – 0	Santos	São José do Rio Preto
16:00	Adriano 78'	Report		Stadium: Teixeirão; Attendance: 6,500; Referee: José Mocellin

14 March 11	Guarani	2 – 0	Santos	Campinas
21:30	Índio 46'; Fabinho 74'	Report		Stadium: Brinco de Ouro; Attendance: 3,366; Referee: João Paulo Araújo

17 March 12	Santos	2 – 1	XV de Jaú	Santos
16:00	Clóvis 79'; Giovanni 80'	Report	90' Marquinhos	Stadium: Vila Belmiro; Attendance: 2,441; Referee: Edílson Pereira de Carvalho

21 March 13	Araçatuba	2 – 0	Santos	Araçatuba
21:30	Garrinchinha 20'; Gil 72'	Report		Stadium: Adhemar de Barros; Attendance: 9,508; Referee: Oscar Roberto de Godói

24 March 14	Santos	0 – 6	Palmeiras	Santos
16:00		Report	5', 87' Rivaldo; 17', 24' Cléber; 59' Cafu; 83' (pen.) Djalminha	Stadium: Vila Belmiro; Attendance: 14,687; Referee: Dalmo Bozzano

31 March 15	Santos	5 – 1	Botafogo–SP	Santos
16:00	Ronaldo Marconato 29', 54'; Fonseca 76' (o.g.); Clóvis 86', 90+1'	Report	51' Jajá	Stadium: Vila Belmiro; Attendance: 2,312; Referee: Antônio Cláudio Perin

==== Second round ====
Pos	Team	Pld	W	D	L	GF	GA	GD	Pts	Qualification or relegation
1	Palmeiras	15	13	1	1	41	11	+30	40	Qualified to finals
2	Santos	15	10	1	4	45	27	+18	31	
3	São Paulo	15	9	3	3	28	14	+14	30	
4	Botafogo	15	9	2	4	24	21	+3	29	
5	Guarani	15	7	4	4	17	14	+3	25	

Updated to match(es) played on 10 June 1996. Source: RSSSF.com
Rules for classification: 1) points; 2) wins; 3) goal difference; 4) number of goals scored.

===== Matches =====
6 April 1	União São João	2 – 8	Santos	Araras
16:00	Cleomar 58', 81' (pen.)	Report	2', 9', 32', 56' (pen.) Giovanni; 36' Clóvis; 79' Vágner; 89' Cláudio; 90+1' Jamelli	Stadium: Hermínio Ometto; Attendance: 3,566; Referee: Óscar Roberto de Godói

11 April 2	Santos	2 – 1	Juventus	Santo André
20:30	Kennedy 65'; Jamelli 68'	Report	23' Sangaletti	Stadium: Bruno José Daniel; Attendance: 6,856; Referee: Carlos Eugênio Simon

14 April 3	São Paulo	2 – 1	Santos	São Paulo
17:00	Almir 40', 72'	Report	43' (pen.) Giovanni	Stadium: Pacaembu; Attendance: 27,000; Referee: Javier Castrilli

18 April 4	Santos	2 – 2	Portuguesa	São Paulo
20:30	Jamelli 23'; Macedo 85'	Report	24' Zé Roberto; 75' Tiba	Stadium: Pacaembu; Attendance: 4,156; Referee: Cláudio Vinícius Cerdeira

21 April 5	Corinthians	2 – 3	Santos	São Paulo
15:45	Edmundo 42'; Marcelinho Carioca 85'	Report	41', 71' Giovanni; 51' Macedo	Stadium: Pacaembu; Attendance: 25,329; Referee: João Paulo Araújo

28 April 6	Santos	6 – 2	Ferroviária	Santos
16:00	Sandro 6'; Robert 28'; Marcelo Passos 38'; Giovanni 47', 53' (pen.), 75' (pen.)	Report	84' Marco Antônio; 89' Otávio Augusto	Stadium: Vila Belmiro; Attendance: 5,470; Referee: Marcos Fábio Spironelli

2 May 7	Novorizontino	2 – 1	Santos	Novo Horizonte
21:35	Nei Júnior 31'; Élder 87'	Report	6' Baiano	Stadium: Jorge Ismael de Biasi; Attendance: 5,755; Referee: Dionísio Roberto Domingos

5 May 8	Santos	3 – 1	Mogi Mirim	Santos
16:00	Giovanni 76'; Marcelo Passos 83'; Camanducaia 89'	Report	65' (pen.) Dirceu	Stadium: Vila Belmiro; Attendance: 3,221; Referee: Roberto Ruscio

8 May 9	Rio Branco	2 – 5	Santos	Americana
20:30	Nélson Bertolazzi 40', 78'	Report	54' Macedo; 59', 90' Robert; 72', 75' Ronaldo Marconato	Stadium: Décio Vitta; Attendance: 4,502; Referee: Flávio de Carvalho

11 May 10	Santos	5 – 3	América–SP	Santos
16:00	Macedo 6', 73'; Giovanni 16'; Robert 22', 38'	Report	12' Adriano; 87' (pen.) Édson; 90+1' Bira	Stadium: Vila Belmiro; Attendance: 8,477; Referee: Carlos Eugênio Simon

16 May 11	Santos	2 – 1	Guarani	Santos
20:30	Camanducaia 51'; Macedo 69'	Report	61' Cairo	Stadium: Vila Belmiro; Attendance: 3,894; Referee: Epifanio González

19 May 12	XV de Jaú	2 – 0	Santos	Jaú
16:00	Auecione 66'; Esquerdinha 78'	Report		Stadium: Zezinho Magalhães; Attendance: 6,299; Referee: Óscar Roberto de Godói

26 May 13	Santos	5 – 2	Araçatuba	Santos
16:00	Macedo 4'; Giovanni 40', 41', 53'; Jamelli 56'	Report	52', 63' Tuta	Stadium: Vila Belmiro; Attendance: 3,147; Referee: Romildo Corrêa

2 June 14	Palmeiras	2 – 0	Santos	São Paulo
19:00	Luizão 6'; Cléber 78'	Report		Stadium: Palestra Itália; Referee: Oscar Ruiz

6 June 15	Botafogo–SP	1 – 2	Santos	Ribeirão Preto
16:00	Lucas 74'	Report	56', 79' Giovanni	Stadium: Santa Cruz; Referee: Almir Teófilo Lima

=== Torneiro de Verão ===
==== Semi-finals ====
22 January	Santos	2 – 2 (3–0 p)	Grêmio	Santos
21:00	Macedo 7'; Jean 81'	Report	25', 59' Sílvio	Stadium: Vila Belmiro; Attendance: 3,686; Referee: José Paulo Araújo
	Penalties
	Gallo (penalty scored); Ronaldo Marconato (penalty scored); Carlinhos (penalty scored)		(penalty missed) Negretti; (penalty missed) Paulo Nunes; (penalty missed) Dinho

==== Finals ====
24 January	Santos	3 – 1	Corinthians	Santos
21:00	Giovanni 9'; Kennedy 18'; Camanducaia 66'	Report	28' Jorginho	Stadium: Vila Belmiro; Referee: Léo Feldman

=== Copa dos Campeões Mundiais ===
==== First stage ====
Pos	Team	Pld	W	D	L	GF	GA	GD	Pts	Qualification or relegation
1	Flamengo	3	2	1	0	4	1	+3	7	Qualified to Final
2	São Paulo	3	1	2	0	4	1	+3	5	Qualified to Final
3	Santos	3	1	1	1	3	3	0	4	
4	Grêmio	3	0	0	3	0	6	−6	0	

Updated to match(es) played on 16 July 1996. Source: RSSSF.com
Rules for classification: 1) points; 2) wins; 3) goal difference; 4) number of goals scored.

===== Matches =====
28 June 1	São Paulo	1 – 1	Santos	Cuiabá
21:30	Müller 30'	Report	9' Jamelli	Stadium: José Fragelli; Attendance: 6,779; Referee: Carlos Eugênio Simon

5 July 2	Santos	1 – 0	Grêmio	Cuiabá
21:30	Jamelli 89'	Report		Stadium: José Fragelli; Referee: Antonio Ferreira Silva

16 July 3	Flamengo	2 – 1	Santos	Brasília
21:30	Marques 21'; Nélio 57'	Report	39' Sandro	Stadium: Mané Garrincha; Attendance: 18,143; Referee: Luciano de Almeida

=== Supercopa Libertadores ===
==== Round of 16 ====
10 September First leg	Peñarol (Uruguay)	1 – 2	(Brazil) Santos	Rivera
21:00	Aguirregaray 45'	Report	57' Jamelli; 89' Robert	Stadium: Atilio Paiva Olivera; Attendance: 16,670; Referee: Daniel Giménez (Argentina)

26 September Second leg	Santos (Brazil)	3 – 0 (5–1 agg.)	(Uruguay) Peñarol	São Paulo
20:30	Sandro 53'; Vágner 64'; Alessandro 77'	Report		Stadium: Ibirapuera; Attendance: 2,603; Referee: Javier Castrilli (Argentina)

==== Quarter-finals ====
16 October First leg	Santos (Brazil)	2 – 0	(Colombia) Atlético Nacional	São José do Rio Preto
20:30	Jean 26'; Jamelli 41'	Report		Stadium: Teixeirão; Attendance: 3,350; Referee: Horacio Marcelo Elizondo (Argentina)

23 October Second leg	Atlético Nacional (Colombia)	3 – 1 (3–3 agg.) (6–7 p)	(Brazil) Santos	Medellín
23:30	Gaviria 38'; Tréllez 54'; Serna 66' (pen.)	Report	64' Camanducaia	Stadium: Atanasio Girardot; Attendance: 33,730; Referee: Javier Castrilli (Argentina)
	Penalties
	Serna (penalty scored); García (penalty scored); Perea (penalty scored); Mosquera (penalty scored); Ospina (penalty missed); Morantes (penalty scored); Ángel (penalty scored); Tuberquia (penalty missed)		(penalty scored) Jamelli; (penalty scored) Sandro; (penalty scored) Marcos Assunção; (penalty scored) Ânderson Lima; (penalty missed) Carlinhos; (penalty scored) Edinho; (penalty scored) Piá; (penalty scored) Camanducaia

==== Semi-finals ====
30 October First leg	Santos (Brazil)	1 – 2	(Argentina) Vélez Sarsfield	Uberlândia
22:00	Alessandro 22'	Report	12' Posse; 90' (pen.) Chilavert	Stadium: Parque do Sabiá; Attendance: 2,534; Referee: José Luiz da Rosa (Uruguay)

14 November Second leg	Vélez Sarsfield (Argentina)	1 – 1 (3–2 agg.)	(Brazil) Santos	Buenos Aires
22:10	Posse 25'	Report	77' Robert	Stadium: José Amalfinati; Referee: Oscar Velázquez (Paraguay)
