= 1997 Santos FC season =

1997 brazilian club season

Santos
1997 season
- President: Samir Jorge Abdul-Hak
- Coach: Vanderlei Luxemburgo
- Stadium: Vila Belmiro
- Campeonato Brasileiro: 7th
- Campeonato Paulista: 3rd
- Copa do Brasil: Second round
- Supercopa Libertadores: Group stage
- Torneio Rio-São Paulo: Winners
- Copa dos Campeões: 3rd
- Top goalscorer: League: Müller (10); All: Macedo (19)

The 1997 season was Santos Futebol Clube's eighty-fifth in existence and the club's third-eighth consecutive season in the top flight of Brazilian football.

== Players ==
=== Squad ===
Note: Flags indicate national team as defined under FIFA eligibility rules; some limited exceptions apply. Players may hold more than one non-FIFA nationality.

No.	Pos.	Nation	Player
—	GK	BRA	Edinho
—	GK	BRA	Marcelo
—	GK	BRA	Nando
—	GK	BRA	Robson
—	GK	BRA	Zetti
—	DF	BRA	Ânderson Lima
—	DF	BRA	Baiano
—	DF	BRA	Cássio
—	DF	BRA	Daniel
—	DF	BRA	Dutra
—	DF	BRA	Jean
—	DF	BRA	Michel
—	DF	BRA	Rogério Seves
—	DF	BRA	Ronaldão
—	DF	BRA	Ronaldo Marconato
—	DF	BRA	Sandro

No.	Pos.	Nation	Player
—	MF	BRA	Alexandre
—	MF	BRA	Arinélson
—	MF	BRA	Caíco
—	MF	BRA	Eduardo Marques
—	MF	BRA	Élder
—	MF	BRA	Fernando Fumagalli
—	MF	BRA	João Santos
—	MF	BRA	Marcelo Passos
—	MF	BRA	Marcos Assunção
—	MF	BRA	Marcos Bazílio
—	MF	BRA	Narciso
—	FW	BRA	Caio
—	FW	PAR	Edgar Báez
—	FW	BRA	Juari
—	FW	BRA	Macedo
—	FW	BRA	Müller

Source: Acervo Santista

=== Statistics ===
==== Appearances and goals ====
Pos.	Nat	Name	Brasileiro		Paulista		Copa do Brasil		Rio-São Paulo		Supercopa		Copa dos Campeões		Total	
Pos.	Nat	Name	Apps	Goals	Apps	Goals	Apps	Goals	Apps	Goals	Apps	Goals	Apps	Goals	Apps	Goals
GK	(Brazil)	Edinho	0	0	0	0	0	0	0	0	2	0	0	0	2	0
GK	(Brazil)	Marcelo	8	0	0 (2)	0	0	0	0	0	1	0	1	0	12	0
GK	(Brazil)	Zetti	23	0	26	0	6	0	6	0	3	0	2	0	66	0
DF	(Brazil)	Ânderson Lima	16 (2)	0	24 (1)	1	5	0	5	1	2	0	2	0	57	2
DF	(Brazil)	Baiano	20 (7)	0	9 (7)	1	2 (3)	0	1 (2)	1	6	0	3	0	60	2
DF	(Brazil)	Cássio	5 (4)	1	13 (2)	0	4	0	0	0	1 (1)	0	3	0	33	1
DF	(Brazil)	Daniel	1	0	0	0	0 (1)	0	0	0	0	0	0	0	2	0
DF	(Brazil)	Dutra	13	1	0	0	0	0	4	0	0 (1)	0	0	0	18	1
DF	(Brazil)	Jean	19	2	1	0	0	0	0	0	5 (1)	0	0	0	26	2
DF	(Brazil)	Michel	0 (3)	0	0 (1)	0	1	0	0	0	0	0	1	0	6	0
DF	(Brazil)	Rogério Seves	5 (3)	0	9 (3)	0	2 (1)	0	2 (2)	0	4	0	0	0	30	0
DF	(Brazil)	Ronaldão	28	0	23	2	5	2	6	0	1	0	0	0	63	4
DF	(Brazil)	Ronaldo Marconato	5 (1)	0	5 (4)	1	1 (1)	0	0	0	0	0	2 (1)	0	20	1
DF	(Brazil)	Sandro	3 (4)	0	7 (4)	0	2 (1)	0	6	0	5	1	1 (1)	0	34	1
MF	(Brazil)	Alexandre	8 (10)	4	17 (5)	4	5 (1)	1	2 (1)	0	5 (1)	0	3	0	58	9
MF	(Brazil)	Arinélson	15 (11)	7	0	0	0	0	0	0	4 (2)	1	0	0	32	8
MF	(Brazil)	Caíco	27 (3)	4	14 (10)	5	3 (2)	1	0 (3)	0	2 (3)	0	3	0	70	10
MF	(Brazil)	Eduardo Marques	0 (2)	0	0 (4)	0	0 (1)	0	0 (1)	0	0	0	0 (1)	0	9	0
MF	(Brazil)	Élder	8 (4)	0	6 (3)	0	0	0	0	0	3 (1)	1	3	0	28	1
MF	(Brazil)	Fernando Fumagalli	0 (2)	0	2 (2)	2	0	0	0	0	0	0	0 (1)	0	7	2
MF	(Brazil)	João Santos	20 (5)	1	0	0	0	0	0	0	2 (1)	0	0	0	28	1
MF	(Brazil)	Marcelo Passos	0 (6)	0	0	0	0	0	0	0	1 (1)	1	0	0	8	1
MF	(Brazil)	Marcos Assunção	14	1	23	5	5	1	6	1	1 (2)	1	0	0	51	9
MF	(Brazil)	Marcos Bazílio	13 (5)	0	0	0	0	0	0	0	4 (1)	0	0	0	23	0
MF	(Brazil)	Narciso	27	3	20 (1)	0	5	0	0	0	3	0	3	0	59	3
FW	(Paraguay)	Báez	0 (5)	1	3 (1)	0	3	1	0 (1)	0	2 (2)	2	0 (1)	0	18	4
FW	(Brazil)	Caio	24 (1)	6	0	0	0	0	0	0	3	1	0	0	28	7
FW	(Brazil)	Juari	0	0	0 (5)	0	0 (1)	0	0 (3)	1	0	0	0 (2)	0	11	1
FW	(Brazil)	Macedo	10 (14)	6	22 (1)	7	5	2	6	2	3	2	3	0	64	19
FW	(Brazil)	Müller	27	10	10	3	0	0	0	0	3	1	2	0	42	14
Players who left the club during the season
DF	(Brazil)	Léo	0	0	1	0	0	0	0	0	0	0	0	0	1	0
MF	(Brazil)	Carlinhos	0	0	0	0	0	0	1	1	0	0	0	0	1	1
MF	(Brazil)	Piá	0	0	1 (5)	0	1	0	4 (2)	0	0	0	0	0	13	0
MF	(Brazil)	Robert	0	0	15 (3)	4	5	3	5	1	0	0	0	0	28	8
MF	(Brazil)	Vágner	1	0	17	4	4	1	6	1	0	0	0	0	28	6
FW	(Brazil)	Alessandro	1	1	13 (3)	6	2	0	6	3	0	0	1 (2)	2	28	12
FW	(Brazil)	Careca	0	0	1 (8)	2	0	0	0	0	0	0	0	0	9	2
FW	(Brazil)	João Fumaça	0	0	4 (4)	5	0 (4)	0	0 (2)	0	0	0	0	0	14	5

Source: Match reports in Competitive matches

==== Goalscorers ====
Ran	Pos	Nat	Name	Brasileiro	Paulistão	Copa do Brasil	Rio-SP	Supercopa	C. Campeões	Total
1	FW	(Brazil)	Macedo	6	7	2	2	2	0	19
2	FW	(Brazil)	Müller	10	3	0	0	1	0	14
3	FW	(Brazil)	Alessandro	1	6	0	3	0	2	12
4	MF	(Brazil)	Caíco	4	5	1	0	0	0	10
5	MF	(Brazil)	Alexandre	4	4	1	0	0	0	9
5	MF	(Brazil)	Marcos Assunção	1	5	1	1	1	0	9
6	MF	(Brazil)	Arinélson	7	0	0	0	1	0	8
6	MF	(Brazil)	Robert	0	4	3	1	0	0	8
7	FW	(Brazil)	Caio	6	0	0	0	1	0	7
8	MF	(Brazil)	Vágner	0	4	1	1	0	0	6
9	FW	(Brazil)	João Fumaça	0	5	0	0	0	0	5
10	DF	(Brazil)	Ronaldão	0	2	2	0	0	0	4
10	FW	(Paraguay)	Báez	1	0	1	0	2	0	4
11	MF	(Brazil)	Narciso	3	0	0	0	0	0	3
12	DF	(Brazil)	Ânderson Lima	0	1	0	1	0	0	2
12	DF	(Brazil)	Baiano	0	1	0	1	0	0	2
12	DF	(Brazil)	Jean	2	0	0	0	0	0	2
12	MF	(Brazil)	Fernando Fumagalli	0	2	0	0	0	0	2
12	FW	(Brazil)	Careca	0	2	0	0	0	0	2
13	DF	(Brazil)	Cássio	1	0	0	0	0	0	1
13	DF	(Brazil)	Dutra	1	0	0	0	0	0	1
13	DF	(Brazil)	Ronaldo Marconato	0	1	0	0	0	0	1
13	DF	(Brazil)	Sandro	0	0	0	0	1	0	1
13	MF	(Brazil)	Élder	0	0	0	0	1	0	1
13	MF	(Brazil)	João Santos	1	0	0	0	0	0	1
13	MF	(Brazil)	Marcelo Passos	0	0	0	0	1	0	1
13	FW	(Brazil)	Juari	0	0	0	1	0	0	1
13	MF	(Brazil)	Carlinhos	0	0	0	1	0	0	1

Source: Match reports in Competitive matches

== Transfers ==
=== In ===
Pos.	Name	Moving from	Source	Notes
LB	(Brazil) Dutra	Mogi Mirim		
GK	(Brazil) Zetti	São Paulo		
CB	(Brazil) Ronaldão	Flamengo		
FW	(Brazil) Macedo	Vasco da Gama		
MF	(Brazil) Caíco	Internacional		
MF	(Brazil) Alexandre	União São João		On loan
MF	(Brazil) Eduardo Marques	Youth system		Promoted
FW	(Brazil) João Fumaça	Youth system		Promoted
GK	(Brazil) Marcelo	Bragantino		
LB	(Brazil) Cássio	Vasco da Gama		On loan
RB	(Brazil) Michel	Youth system		Promoted
RB	(Brazil) Léo	Desportiva		
FW	(Brazil) Müller	(Italy) Perugia		
FW	(Brazil) Careca	(Japan) Kashiwa Reysol		
MF	(Brazil) Fernando Fumagalli	Ferroviária		
MF	(Brazil) Arinélson	Iraty		
MF	(Brazil) Marcelo Passos	Flamengo		Loan return
LB	(Brazil) Marcos Adriano	Atlético Mineiro		Loan return
FW	(Brazil) Caio	(Italy) Inter Milan		
MF	(Brazil) João Santos	Bragantino		On loan

=== Out ===
Pos.	Name	Moving to	Source	Notes
GK	(Brazil) Sérgio Guedes	São José		
FW	(Brazil) Otavio Augusto	Ferroviária		Loan return
FW	(Brazil) Jamelli	(Japan) Kashiwa Reysol		
MF	(Brazil) Carlinhos	Guarani		
MF	(Brazil) Gallo	Guarani		
MF	(Brazil) Ranielli	(Mexico) Cruz Azul		
LB	(Brazil) Marcos Adriano	Atlético Mineiro		
MF	(Brazil) Marcelo Passos	Flamengo		On loan
FW	(Brazil) Andradina	Mogi Mirim		
FW	(Brazil) Camanducaia	Portuguesa Santista		On loan
LB	(Brazil) Gustavo Nery	Coritiba		On loan
MF	(Brazil) Piá	Coritiba		On loan
FW	(Brazil) Careca	Campinas		
MF	(Brazil) Robert	Grêmio		
FW	(Brazil) Alessandro	(Japan) Júbilo Iwata		On loan
MF	(Brazil) Vágner	(Italy) Roma		
FW	(Brazil) João Fumaça	Remo		On loan

== Friendlies ==
29 July Friendly	Rosenborg (Norway)	2 – 2	Santos	Oslo, Norway
	Brattbakk 51'; Boateng 74'	Report	13', 23' Caio	Stadium: Bislett Stadium; Attendance: 15,000; Referee: Bamle Loe Kamben

1 August Friendly	Barnsley (England)	0 – 3	Santos	Barnsley, England
		Report	16', 35' Arinélson; 77' Caio	Stadium: Oakwell; Attendance: 10,000; Referee: Stephen John Lodge

3 August Friendly	Wolverhampton (England)	1 – 1	Santos	Wolverhampton, England
	Goodman 53'	Report	77' Macedo	Stadium: Molineux Stadium; Attendance: 20,000; Referee: Terry Holbrook

5 August Friendly	Bradford City (England)	1 – 3	Santos	Bradford, England
	Murray 34'	Report	17' Alexandre; 65' Caio; 85' Arinélson	Stadium: Valley Parade; Attendance: 8,000; Referee: Kame Lynch

== Competitions ==
=== Campeonato Brasileiro ===
==== Results summary ====
Overall								Home						Away					
Pld	W	D	L	GF	GA	GD	Pts	W	D	L	GF	GA	GD	W	D	L	GF	GA	GD
31	14	6	11	48	43	+5	48	13	2	1	38	14	+24	1	4	10	10	29	−19

Source: Acervo Santista

==== First stage ====
Pos	Team	Pld	W	D	L	GF	GA	GD	Pts	
4	Portuguesa	25	12	9	4	45	28	+17	45	Qualified to Second Phase
5	Flamengo	25	12	6	7	30	24	+6	42	Qualified to Second Phase
6	Santos	25	12	5	8	39	33	+6	41	Qualified to Second Phase
7	Palmeiras	25	10	10	5	47	24	+23	40	Qualified to Second Phase
8	Juventude	25	9	10	6	24	20	+4	37	Qualified to Second Phase

Source: https://rsssfbrasil.com/tablesae/br1997.htm

===== Matches =====
6 July 1	Flamengo	2 – 3	Santos	Rio de Janeiro
16:00	Lúcio 57', 80'	Report	15' Alessandro; 23' Alexandre; 90' Macedo	Stadium: Maracanã; Attendance: 6,014; Referee: Fabiano Gonçalves

12 July 2	Paraná	2 – 0	Santos	Curitiba
21:20	Bira 57', 66'	Report		Stadium: Durival de Brito; Attendance: 6,933; Referee: Sidrack Marinho dos Santos

17 July 3	Internacional	2 – 0	Santos	Porto Alegre
20:30	Christian 35', 74'	Report		Stadium: Beira-Rio; Attendance: 11,658; Referee: Jorge dos Santos Travassos

20 July 4	Santos	3 – 0	Goiás	Santos
16:00	Arinélson 4', 13'; Macedo 35'	Report		Stadium: Vila Belmiro; Attendance: 8,942; Referee: Cláudio Vinícius Cerdeira

23 July 5	Santos	3 – 0	Grêmio	Santos
21:30	Müller 11'; Cássio 48'; Caíco 66'	Report		Stadium: Vila Belmiro; Attendance: 11,259; Referee: Francisco Dacildo Mourão

26 July 6	Sport Recife	1 – 1	Santos	Recife
21:30	Alexandre Lopes 16'	Report	13' Arinélson	Stadium: Ilha do Retiro; Attendance: 5,509; Referee: Antônio Pereira da Silva

10 August 7	Bragantino	2 – 1	Santos	Bragança Paulista
17:00	Sandro Gaúcho 7'; Geraldo 20'	Report	43' Narciso	Stadium: Marcelo Stéfani; Attendance: 3,573; Referee: Paulo César de Oliveira

20 August 8	Juventude	1 – 1	Santos	Caxias do Sul
21:30	Wallace 78' (pen.)	Report	44' Caio	Stadium: Alfredo Jaconi; Attendance: 630; Referee: Ubiraci Damásio de Oliveira

24 August 9	Santos	3 – 1	Vasco da Gama	Santos
16:00	Caio 29', 49'; Arinélson 51'	Report	69' Luiz Cláudio	Stadium: Vila Belmiro; Attendance: 9,461; Referee: Sidrack Marinho dos Santos

30 August 10	Fluminense	1 – 0	Santos	Rio de Janeiro
21:40	Rôni 44'	Report		Stadium: Maracanã; Attendance: 5,449; Referee: Antônio Pereira da Silva

7 September 11	Santos	2 – 0	Criciúma	Santos
16:00	Caio 43' (pen.); Müller 85'	Report		Stadium: Vila Belmiro; Attendance: 7,155; Referee: Édson Esperidião

11 September 12	Atlético Mineiro	2 – 1	Santos	Belo Horizonte
21:50	Sandro 87'; Hernani 88'	Report	36' Caíco	Stadium: Mineirão; Attendance: 12,349; Referee: Jorge Travassos

14 September 13	Santos	2 – 1	Coritiba	Santos
16:00	Macedo 78'; Báez 87'	Report	45+9' Basílio	Stadium: Vila Belmiro; Attendance: 8,557; Referee: Luciano Almeida

17 September 14	Santos	2 – 1	São Paulo	Santos
21:40	Jean 38'; Macedo 55'	Report	90' Aristizábal	Stadium: Vila Belmiro; Attendance: 19,048; Referee: Ubiraci Damásio

21 September 15	Palmeiras	5 – 0	Santos	São Paulo
16:00	Oséas 16', 42'; Alex 45'; Viola 54', 86'	Report		Stadium: Palestra Itália; Attendance: 14,849; Referee: Sidrack Marinho dos Santos

27 September 16	Santos	1 – 2	Botafogo	Santos
21:40	Müller 12'	Report	57', 68' Sinval	Stadium: Vila Belmiro; Attendance: 7,291; Referee: Carlos Eugênio Simon

1 October 17	Santos	3 – 1	União São João	Santos
20:30	Müller 13', 20'; Macedo 81'	Report	55' Helberte	Stadium: Vila Belmiro; Attendance: 3,355; Referee: Valdomito Mathias Silva Filho

5 October 18	Portuguesa	1 – 1	Santos	São Paulo
16:00	Rodrigo Fabri 69'	Report	88' Müller	Stadium: Canindé; Attendance: 15,487; Referee: Cláudio Vinícius Cerdeira

11 October 19	Santos	3 – 2	Guarani	Santos
16:00	Caio 14'; Müller 44', 82'	Report	65' Paulo Isidoro; 79' Dinei	Stadium: Vila Belmiro; Attendance: 8,565; Referee: Antônio Pereira da Silva

14 October 20	Santos	1 – 0	Corinthians	Santos
21:40	Jean 74'	Report		Stadium: Vila Belmiro; Attendance: 20,618; Referee: Sidrack Marinho dos Santos

19 October 21	Atlético Paranaense	1 – 1	Santos	Curitiba
16:00	Luizinho Vieira 29' (pen.)	Report	11' Caíco	Stadium: Vila Olímpica; Attendance: 14,557; Referee: Ubiraci Damásio de Oliveira

25 October 22	Santos	3 – 1	Bahia	Santos
21:40	João Santos 34'; Arinélson 51'; Dutra 90+3'	Report	20' Róbson Luís	Stadium: Vila Belmiro; Attendance: 5,440; Referee: Antônio Pereira da Silva

1 November 23	Vitória	2 – 0	Santos	Salvador
21:40	Kléber 38'; Narcizio 90+1'	Report		Stadium: Barradão; Attendance: 9,160; Referee: Carlos Eugênio Simon

5 November 24	Santos	2 – 0	América de Natal	Santos
21:40	Müller 31'; Caio 58'	Report		Stadium: Vila Belmiro; Attendance: 7,521; Referee: Francisco Dacildo Mourão

8 November 25	Santos	2 – 2	Cruzeiro	Santos
21:40	Arinélson 39', 63'	Report	13' Marcelo Ramos; 82' Elivélton	Stadium: Vila Belmiro; Attendance: 5,125; Referee: Luciano Almeida

==== Second stage ====
Group B
Pos	Team	Pld	W	D	L	GF	GA	GD	Pts	Qualification
1	Palmeiras	6	5	1	0	10	4	+6	16	Qualified for the final
2	Santos	6	2	1	3	9	10	−1	7	
3	Internacional	6	2	0	4	8	10	−2	6	
4	Atlético Mineiro	6	2	0	4	6	9	−3	6	

===== Matches =====
15 November 1	Atlético Mineiro	2 – 0	Santos	Belo Horizonte
21:50	Jorginho 5'; Valdir 51' (pen.)	Report		Stadium: Mineirão; Attendance: 45,413; Referee: Carlos Eugênio Simon

23 November 2	Santos	3 – 3	Palmeiras	São Paulo
17:00	Narciso 45'; Alexandre 46'; Macedo 73'	Report	4', 56' Viola; 71' Zinho	Stadium: Morumbi; Attendance: 33,795; Referee: Francisco Dacildo Mourão

26 November 3	Santos	4 – 0	Internacional	São Paulo
20:30	Alexandre 9'; Müller 53'; Marcos Assunção 72'; Caíco 86'	Report		Stadium: Morumbi; Attendance: 15,271; Referee: Cláudio Vinícius Cerdeira

29 November 4	Internacional	4 – 1	Santos	Porto Alegre
21:40	Fabiano Souza 42'; Christian 53' (pen.); Marcelo Rosa 70'; Anderson Luiz 76'	Report	84' (pen.) Alexandre	Stadium: Beira-Rio; Attendance: 15,260; Referee: Ubiraci Damásio de Oliveira

3 December 5	Palmeiras	1 – 0	Santos	São Paulo
21:40	Galeano 60'	Report		Stadium: Morumbi; Attendance: 20,770; Referee: Antônio Pereira da Silva

6 December 6	Santos	1 – 0	Atlético Mineiro	São Paulo
21:40	Narciso 67' (pen.)	Report		Stadium: Morumbi; Attendance: 679; Referee: Luciano Augusto Almeida

=== Copa do Brasil ===
==== Preliminary round ====
20 February First leg	Desportiva	1 – 1	Santos	Cariacica
21:30	Leo 65'	Report	37' Caíco	Stadium: Engenheiro Araripe; Attendance: 5,803; Referee: Carlos Elias Pimentel

27 February Second leg	Santos	5 – 1 (6–2 agg.)	Desportiva	São Paulo
21:30	Robert 13', 40'; Ronaldão 23', 88'; Marcos Assunção 90' (pen.)	Report	52' (pen.) Leo	Stadium: Palestra Itália; Attendance: 1,525; Referee: Lincoln Bojaille

==== First round ====
13 March First leg	Figueirense	0 – 1	Santos	Florianópolis
21:30		Report	4' Báez	Stadium: Orlando Scarpelli; Attendance: 14,612; Referee: Alexandre José Lourenço Barreto

18 March Second leg	Santos	3 – 2 (4–2 agg.)	Figueirense	São Paulo
18:30	Alexandre 5'; Macedo 46'; Vágner 83'	Report	39' Silva; 85' Rafael	Stadium: Palestra Itália; Attendance: 2,582; Referee: Wagner Tardelli de Azevedo

==== Second round ====
27 March First leg	Santos	2 – 0	Internacional	Santos
21:30	Macedo 59'; Robert 65'	Report		Stadium: Vila Belmiro; Attendance: 15,000; Referee: Antônio Pereira da Silva

3 April Second leg	Internacional	2 – 0 (2–2 agg.) (3–2 p)	Santos	Porto Alegre
20:30	Arílson 25', 43'	Report		Stadium: Beira-Rio; Attendance: 28,332; Referee: Márcio Rezende de Freitas
	Penalties
	Arílson (penalty scored); Fernando (penalty scored); Paulo Roberto (penalty scored); Washington (penalty missed); Gamarra (penalty missed)		(penalty scored) Vágner; (penalty scored) Ânderson Lima; (penalty missed) Marcos Assunção; (penalty missed) Sandro; (penalty missed) Robert

=== Campeonato Paulista ===
==== First stage ====
===== Group 4 =====
Pos	Team	Pld	W	D	L	GF	GA	GD	Pts	Qualification or relegation
1	Palmeiras	23	14	6	3	58	27	+31	48	Qualified to Final group
2	Santos	23	13	7	3	45	23	+22	46	Qualified to Final group
3	Portuguesa	23	12	7	4	46	33	+13	43	
4	Guarani	23	7	8	8	37	45	−8	29	
5	Juventus	23	5	6	12	38	53	−15	21	
6	São José	23	4	9	10	29	40	−11	21	
7	Botafogo	23	4	8	11	22	33	−11	20	Relegated
8	América	23	4	5	14	28	62	−34	17	Relegated

Updated to match(es) played on 18 May 1997. Source: RSSSF.com
Rules for classification: 1) points; 2) wins; 3) goal difference; 4) number of goals scored.

===== Matches =====
9 February 1	América–SP	1 – 3	Santos	São José do Rio Preto
16:00	Marcelo Sergipano 87'	Report	12' Alessandro; 23' Alexandre; 59' Robert	Stadium: Benedito Teixeira; Attendance: 10,310; Referee: José Mocellin

16 February 2	Santos	1 – 0	Juventus	São Paulo
16:00	Alessandro 50'	Report		Stadium: Morumbi; Attendance: 9,854; Referee: Carlos Jack Magno

19 February 3	Guarani	3 – 2	Santos	Campinas
20:30	Aílton 40'; Cris 86'; Ricardo Mendes 89'	Report	59' Robert; 78' Macedo	Stadium: Brinco de Ouro; Attendance: 9,539; Referee: Cláudio Vinícius Cerdeira

22 February 4	Santos	2 – 1	Portuguesa	Jundiaí
16:00	Vágner 35'; Robert 85'	Report	57' Marcelo Miguel	Stadium: Jayme Cintra; Attendance: 8,014; Referee: Júlio Matto

25 February 5	Santos	1 – 1	Botafogo–SP	São Paulo
20:30	Macedo 2'	Report	20' Marco Aurélio	Stadium: Morumbi; Attendance: 3,355; Referee: Oscar Ruiz

2 March 6	Palmeiras	2 – 0	Santos	São Paulo
16:00	Galeano 33'; Marquinhos 89'	Report		Stadium: Palestra Itália; Attendance: 15,814; Referee: Carlos Eugênio Simon

6 March 7	São José	0 – 1	Santos	São José dos Campos
20:30		Report	22' (pen.) Marcos Assunção	Stadium: Martins Pereira; Attendance: 13,799; Referee: Dalmo Bozzano

9 March 8	Santos	5 – 2	Inter de Limeira	Santos
15:00	Marcos Assunção 11'; Alexandre 18'; Ronaldão 43'; João Fumaça 89'; Vágner 90+5' (pen.)	Report	8', 47' Sérgio Araújo	Stadium: Ulrico Mursa; Attendance: 7,718; Referee: Edílson Pereira de Carvalho

16 March 9	São Paulo	1 – 1	Santos	São Paulo
11:00	Dodô 49'	Report	77' (pen.) Marcos Assunção	Stadium: Morumbi; Attendance: 26,425; Referee: José Mocellin

20 March 10	Santos	0 – 0	União São João	São José dos Campos
20:45		Report		Stadium: Martins Pereira; Attendance: 3,610; Referee: Cláudio Vinícius Cerdeira

23 March 11	Rio Branco	1 – 1	Santos	Americana
16:00	Marcelinho Paraíba 13'	Report	24' Robert	Stadium: Décio Vitta; Attendance: 13,708; Referee: Francisco Dacildo Mourão Albuquerque

30 March 12	Santos	4 – 2	Mogi Mirim	Santos
16:00	Macedo 5', 59'; Vágner 52'; Alexandre 79'	Report	25' Andradina; 40' Luís Cláudio	Stadium: Vila Belmiro; Attendance: 12,177; Referee: João Paulo Araújo

6 April 13	Corinthians	3 – 1	Santos	São Paulo
16:00	Henrique 4'; Mirandinha 10'; Túlio 38'	Report	68' Baiano	Stadium: Morumbi; Attendance: 33,422; Referee: Oscar Roberto de Godói

10 April 14	Santos	4 – 1	Araçatuba	Santos
20:30	João Fumaça 2', 47', 88'; Vágner 57' (pen.)	Report	13' Flávio Guarujá	Stadium: Vila Belmiro; Attendance: 6,282; Referee: Flávio de Carvalho

13 April 15	Portuguesa Santista	0 – 2	Santos	Santos
15:00		Report	25' João Fumaça; 45+4' Fernando Fumagalli	Stadium: Ulrico Mursa; Attendance: 8,000; Referee: Edílson Pereira de Carvalho

20 April 16	Inter de Limeira	1 – 1	Santos	Limeira
16:00	Dinei 36'	Report	73' Fernando Fumagalli	Stadium: Limeirão; Attendance: 13,189; Referee: Júlio Matto

23 April 17	Santos	2 – 2	São Paulo	Santos
20:30	Ânderson Lima 29'; Caíco 42'	Report	21', 73' Dodô	Stadium: Vila Belmiro; Attendance: 19,815; Referee: Sidrack Marinho

27 April 18	União São João	1 – 1	Santos	Araras
16:00	Souza 41'	Report	48' Marcos Assunção	Stadium: Hermínio Ometto; Attendance: 6,519; Referee: Alfredo dos Santos Loebeling

1 May 19	Santos	3 – 1	Rio Branco	Santos
16:00	Marcos Assunção 15'; Macedo 29'; Alessandro 35'	Report	80' Marcelinho Paraíba	Stadium: Vila Belmiro; Attendance: 10,573; Referee: João Paulo Araújo

3 May 20	Mogi Mirim	0 – 2	Santos	Mogi Mirim
16:00		Report	34' Macedo; 77' Caíco	Stadium: Wilson de Barros; Attendance: 5,839; Referee: Oscar Roberto de Godói

10 May 21	Santos	2 – 0	Corinthians	Santos
21:40	Caíco 33'; Müller 90+2'	Report		Stadium: Vila Belmiro; Attendance: 19,210; Referee: Oscar Ruiz

14 May 22	Araçatuba	0 – 1	Santos	Araçatuba
20:30		Report	8' Caíco	Stadium: Adhemar de Barros; Attendance: 11,614; Referee: Sidrack Marinho dos Santos

18 May 23	Santos	5 – 0	Portuguesa Santista	Santos
16:00	Müller 9'; Ronaldão 29'; Alessandro 42', 76'; Careca 52'	Report		Stadium: Vila Belmiro; Attendance: 13,686; Referee: Alfredo dos Santos Loebeling

==== Final stage ====
Pos	Team	Pld	W	D	L	GF	GA	GD	Pts	Qualification or relegation
1	Corinthians	3	2	1	0	7	4	+3	7	Champions
2	São Paulo	3	2	1	0	6	2	+4	7	
3	Santos	3	1	0	2	7	5	+2	3	
4	Palmeiras	3	0	0	3	1	10	−9	0	

Updated to match(es) played on 5 June 1997. Source: RSSSF.com
Rules for classification: 1) points; 2) Best season record

===== Matches =====
24 May 1	Corinthians	4 – 3	Santos	São Paulo
21:40	Marcelinho Carioca 10'; Mirandinha 20'; Souza 48'; Gilmar Fubá 73'	Report	14' Macedo; 39' (pen.) Ronaldo Marconato; 85' Müller	Stadium: Morumbi; Attendance: 30,159; Referee: Julio Matto

31 May 2	São Paulo	1 – 0	Santos	São Paulo
21:40	Dodô 36' (pen.)	Report		Stadium: Pacaembu; Attendance: 30,030; Referee: Hellmut Krug

4 June 3	Santos	4 – 0	Palmeiras	Santos
20:30	Alexandre 14'; Careca 17'; Caíco 85'; Alessandro 90'	Report		Stadium: Vila Belmiro; Attendance: 2,471; Referee: Carlos Eugênio Simon

=== Torneiro Rio-São Paulo ===
==== Quarter-finals ====
21 January First leg	Santos	2 – 2	Vasco da Gama	São Paulo
21:30	Carlinhos 14'; Vágner 49'	Report	6' (pen.), 85' Ramon	Stadium: Morumbi; Attendance: 6,723; Referee: Léo Feldman

25 January Second leg	Vasco da Gama	3 – 3 (5–5 agg.) (3–4 p)	Santos	Rio de Janeiro
16:00	Ramon 12', 63'; Juninho Pernambucano 78'	Report	36', 76' Alessandro; 46' Macedo	Stadium: São Januário; Attendance: 4,199; Referee: Alfredo dos Santos Loebeling
	Penalties
	Juninho Pernambucano (penalty scored); Ramon (penalty scored); Pimentel (penalty missed); Gian (penalty scored); Marquinhos (penalty missed)		(penalty scored) Vágner; (penalty scored) Sandro; (penalty missed) Robert; (penalty scored) Marcos Assunção; (penalty scored) Dutra

==== Semi-finals ====
28 January First leg	Palmeiras	1 – 3	Santos	São Paulo
21:30	Djalminha 70'	Report	43' Baiano; 88' (pen.) Marcos Assunção; 90+2' Robert	Stadium: Palestra Itália; Attendance: 10,456; Referee: Oscar Roberto de Godói

1 February Second leg	Santos	0 – 1 (3–2 agg.)	Palmeiras	Presidente Prudente
16:00		Report	78' (o.g.) Ronaldão	Stadium: Farahzão; Attendance: 18,249; Referee: Francisco Dacildo Mourão Albuquerque

==== Finals ====
4 February First leg	Santos	2 – 1	Flamengo	São Paulo
21:30	Alessandro 6'; Macedo 29'	Report	85' Marcelo Ribeiro	Stadium: Morumbi; Attendance: 24,236; Referee: Cláudio Vinícius Cerdeira

6 February Second leg	Flamengo	2 – 2 (3–4 agg.)	Santos	Rio de Janeiro
21:30	Romário 37', 45'	Report	33' Ânderson Lima; 77' Juari	Stadium: Maracanã; Attendance: 70,729; Referee: Oscar Roberto de Godói

=== Copa dos Campeões Mundiais ===
==== First stage ====
Pos	Team	Pld	W	D	L	GF	GA	GD	Pts	Qualification or relegation
1	São Paulo	3	2	1	0	7	3	+4	7	Qualified to Final
2	Flamengo	3	1	2	0	6	4	+2	5	Qualified to Final
3	Santos	3	1	1	1	2	4	−2	4	
4	Grêmio	3	0	0	3	4	8	−4	0	

Updated to match(es) played on 26 June 1997. Source: RSSSF.com
Rules for classification: 1) points; 2) wins; 3) goal difference; 4) number of goals scored.

===== Matches =====
12 June 1	Santos	0 – 0	Flamengo	Campo Grande
21:40		Report		Stadium: Morenão; Attendance: 15,296; Referee: Carlos Eugênio Simon

17 June 2	São Paulo	3 – 0	Santos	Campo Grande
21:40	Dodô 15', 77'; Belletti 90+2'	Report		Stadium: Morenão; Attendance: 11,958; Referee: Oscar Roberto de Godói

26 June 3	Santos	2 – 1	Grêmio	Brasília
16:00	Alessandro 36', 75'	Report	66' Luís Carlos Goiano	Stadium: Mané Garrincha; Attendance: 192; Referee: Wilson de Souza Mendonça

=== Supercopa Libertadores ===
==== Group stage ====
Pos	Team	Pld	W	D	L	GF	GA	GD	Pts	Qualification
1	(Argentina) River Plate	6	5	0	1	17	9	+8	15	Semifinals
2	(Brazil) Vasco da Gama	6	3	1	2	9	12	−3	10	
3	(Brazil) Santos	6	2	1	3	11	12	−1	7	
4	(Argentina) Racing	6	0	2	4	11	15	−4	2	

Source: RSSSF
Rules for classification: 1) points; 2) goal difference; 3) number of goals scored.

===== Matches =====
28 August 1	Vasco da Gama (Brazil)	2 – 1	(Brazil) Santos	Rio de Janeiro
21:40	Evair 33'; Jean 75' (o.g.)	Report	88' Marcelo Passos	Stadium: São Januário; Attendance: 1,660; Referee: Francisco Dacildo Mourão

4 September 2	River Plate (Argentina)	3 – 2	(Brazil) Santos	Buenos Aires, Argentina
21:40	Escudero 41'; Rambert 67'; Salas 74'	Report	12' Caio; 22' Müller	Stadium: Monumental de Núñez; Referee: Epifanio González

25 September 3	Racing (Argentina)	2 – 2	(Brazil) Santos	Avellaneda, Argentina
20:50	Centeno 9'; Vilallonga 53'	Report	72' Báez; 86' Arinélson	Stadium: El Cilindro; Referee: Jorge Nieves

16 October 4	Santos (Brazil)	1 – 2	(Brazil) Vasco da Gama	Santos
21:00	Báez 51'	Report	1' Odvan; 75' Luiz Cláudio	Stadium: Vila Belmiro; Attendance: 3,615; Referee: Wilson de Souza Mendonça

22 October 5	Santos (Brazil)	2 – 1	(Argentina) River Plate	Santos
21:55	Élder 24'; Macedo 43'	Report	40' Borrelli	Stadium: Vila Belmiro; Attendance: 921; Referee: Mário Sánchez

28 October 6	Santos (Brazil)	3 – 2	(Argentina) Racing	Santos
21:55	Macedo 22'; Sandro 72'; Marcos Assunção 73'	Report	55' Vilallonga; 74' Delgado	Stadium: Vila Belmiro; Attendance: 1,593; Referee: Epifanio González
