= 1999 Santos FC season =

Santos
1999 season
- President: Samir Jorge Abdul-Hak
- Coach: Emerson Leão; Paulo Autuori
- Stadium: Vila Belmiro
- Campeonato Brasileiro: 11th
- Campeonato Paulista: Semi-finals
- Copa do Brasil: Second round
- Torneio Rio-São Paulo: Runners-up
- Qualification to Libertadores: First round
- Top goalscorer: League: Dodô (13); All: Viola (18)

The 1999 season was Santos Futebol Clube's eighty-seventh in existence and the club's forty consecutive season in the top flight of Brazilian football.

Source: Match reports in Competitive matches

== Players ==
=== Squad ===
Note: Flags indicate national team as defined under FIFA eligibility rules; some limited exceptions apply. Players may hold more than one non-FIFA nationality.

No.	Pos.	Nation	Player
—	GK	BRA	Fernando Leão
—	GK	BRA	Nando
—	GK	BRA	Nei
—	GK	BRA	Zetti
—	DF	BRA	Andrei
—	DF	BRA	Ceará
—	DF	BRA	Cláudio
—	DF	BRA	Claudiomiro
—	DF	ECU	Fricson George
—	DF	BRA	Gustavo Nery
—	DF	BRA	Jean
—	DF	BRA	Marcelo Heleno
—	DF	BRA	Michel
—	DF	BRA	Valdir
—	MF	BRA	Aílton
—	MF	BRA	Caíco

No.	Pos.	Nation	Player
—	MF	BRA	Eduardo Marques
—	MF	BRA	Élson
—	MF	BRA	Fumagalli
—	MF	BRA	Jadson
—	MF	BRA	Lúcio
—	MF	BRA	Marcelo Silva
—	MF	BRA	Marcos Bazílio
—	MF	BRA	Narciso
—	MF	JPN	Sugawara
—	FW	BRA	Adiel
—	FW	COL	Aristizábal
—	FW	BRA	Deivid
—	FW	BRA	Dodô
—	FW	GER	Paulo Rink
—	FW	BRA	Rodrigão

Source: Acervo Santista

=== Statistics ===
==== Appearances and goals ====
Pos.	Nat	Name	Campeonato Brasileiro Série A		Campeonato Paulista		Copa do Brasil		Torneio Rio-São Paulo		Qualification to Libertadores		Total	
Pos.	Nat	Name	Apps	Goals	Apps	Goals	Apps	Goals	Apps	Goals	Apps	Goals	Apps	Goals
GK	(Brazil)	Fernando Leão	0	0	0	0	0	0	0 (1)	0	0	0	1	0
GK	(Brazil)	Nando	0	0	0	0	1	0	0	0	0	0	1	0
GK	(Brazil)	Nei	0	0	0	0	0	0	0	0	1	0	1	0
GK	(Brazil)	Zetti	21	0	18	0	3	0	10	0	1	0	53	0
DF	(Brazil)	Andrei	14 (3)	0	6 (1)	1	1	0	0	0	2	0	27	1
DF	(Brazil)	Ceará	4	0	0	0	0	0	0	0	2	0	6	0
DF	(Brazil)	Cláudio	11	1	0	0	0	0	0	0	0	0	11	1
DF	(Brazil)	Claudiomiro	17	0	11	1	3	0	9	0	2	0	42	1
DF	(Ecuador)	Fricson George	1	0	0	0	0	0	0	0	0	0	1	0
DF	(Brazil)	Gustavo Nery	17	1	18	4	3	1	5	0	2	0	45	6
DF	(Brazil)	Jean	10	0	5 (5)	0	2 (1)	0	2 (1)	0	0	0	26	0
DF	(Brazil)	Michel	17	0	6 (2)	0	2 (1)	0	5 (3)	0	0	0	36	0
DF	(Brazil)	Valdir	2	0	0 (2)	0	1 (1)	0	0 (1)	0	0	0	7	0
MF	(Brazil)	Aílton	5 (12)	1	0	0	0	0	0	0	2	1	19	2
MF	(Brazil)	Caíco	5 (5)	0	2 (5)	0	1 (1)	0	2 (4)	1	0	0	25	1
MF	(Brazil)	Eduardo Marques	6 (5)	1	2 (3)	0	2 (1)	0	7 (1)	1	2	0	29	2
MF	(Brazil)	Élson	16 (3)	1	0	0	0	0	0	0	2	0	21	1
MF	(Brazil)	Fumagalli	2 (3)	1	0	0	0	0	0	0	0	0	5	1
MF	(Brazil)	Lúcio	13 (3)	0	0 (8)	0	0 (2)	0	0	0	0 (2)	0	28	0
MF	(Brazil)	Marcelo Silva	1 (3)	0	0	0	0	0	0	0	0	0	4	0
MF	(Brazil)	Marcos Bazílio	6 (3)	0	5 (8)	0	4	0	8 (2)	0	0 (2)	0	38	0
MF	(Brazil)	Narciso	15	0	16	4	0	0	2	0	2	0	35	4
FW	(Brazil)	Adiel	6 (3)	0	0	0	0	0	0	0	0 (1)	0	10	0
FW	(Brazil)	Deivid	1 (1)	2	0	0	0	0	0	0	2	0	4	2
FW	(Brazil)	Dodô	21	13	0	0	0	0	0	0	2	0	23	13
FW	(Brazil) / (Germany)	Paulo Rink	12	0	3	1	0	0	0	0	0	0	15	1
FW	(Brazil)	Rodrigão	4 (5)	2	6 (4)	4	2 (1)	3	4 (4)	1	0 (1)	0	31	10
Players who left the club during the season
DF	(Brazil)	Ânderson Lima	0	0	12 (1)	2	2	1	5	0	0	0	20	3
DF	(Brazil)	Argel	0	0	17	2	2	0	10	1	0	0	29	3
DF	(Brazil)	Dutra	0	0	0	0	1	0	5	1	0	0	6	1
DF	(Brazil)	Sandro	0	0	1	0	0	0	2 (2)	0	0	0	5	0
MF	(Brazil)	Arinélson	0	0	0	0	0	0	0 (1)	0	0	0	1	0
MF	(Brazil)	Bechara	0	0	1 (1)	0	0 (1)	0	0 (1)	0	0	0	4	0
MF	(Brazil)	Élder	0	0	0	0	0 (1)	0	0 (3)	0	0	0	4	0
MF	(Brazil)	Jorginho	0	0	17	3	4	0	10	1	0	0	31	4
MF	(Brazil)	Marcos Assunção	0	0	9	3	2	1	7	4	0	0	18	8
MF	(Brazil)	Rodrigo Fabri	0	0	14 (3)	1	3	0	0	0	0	0	20	1
MF	(Japan)	Sugawara	0 (1)	0	1 (2)	0	0	0	0	0	0	0	4	0
FW	(Brazil)	Alessandro	0	0	15	4	3	0	10	5	0	0	28	9
FW	(Colombia)	Aristizábal	4 (3)	1	1 (6)	1	0	0	0	0	0	0	14	2
FW	(Brazil)	Camanducaia	0	0	0	0	0 (1)	0	1 (4)	0	0	0	5	0
FW	(Brazil)	Macedo	0	0	0	0	0	0	0 (1)	0	0	0	1	0
FW	(Brazil)	Viola	0	0	12 (1)	9	2	6	6	3	0	0	20	18

Source: Match reports in Competitive matches

==== Goalscorers ====
Ran	Pos	Nat	Name	Brasileiro	Paulistão	Copa do Brasil	Rio-SP	Seletiva	Total
1	FW	(Brazil)	Viola	0	9	6	3	0	18
2	FW	(Brazil)	Dodô	13	0	0	0	0	13
3	FW	(Brazil)	Rodrigão	2	4	3	1	0	10
4	FW	(Brazil)	Alessandro	0	4	0	5	0	9
5	MF	(Brazil)	Marcos Assunção	0	3	1	4	0	8
6	DF	(Brazil)	Gustavo Nery	1	4	1	0	0	6
7	MF	(Brazil)	Jorginho	0	3	0	1	0	4
7	MF	(Brazil)	Narciso	0	4	0	0	0	4
8	DF	(Brazil)	Ânderson Lima	0	2	1	0	0	3
8	DF	(Brazil)	Argel	0	2	0	1	0	3
9	MF	(Brazil)	Aílton	1	0	0	0	1	2
9	FW	(Colombia)	Aristizábal	1	1	0	0	0	2
9	FW	(Brazil)	Deivid	2	0	0	0	0	2
9	MF	(Brazil)	Eduardo Marques	1	0	0	1	0	2
10	DF	(Brazil)	Andrei	0	1	0	0	0	1
10	MF	(Brazil)	Caíco	0	0	0	1	0	1
10	DF	(Brazil)	Cláudio	1	0	0	0	0	1
10	DF	(Brazil)	Claudiomiro	0	1	0	0	0	1
10	DF	(Brazil)	Dutra	0	0	0	1	0	1
10	MF	(Brazil)	Élson	1	0	0	0	0	1
10	MF	(Brazil)	Fumagalli	1	0	0	0	0	1
10	FW	(Brazil) / (Germany)	Paulo Rink	0	1	0	0	0	1
10	MF	(Brazil)	Rodrigo Fabri	0	1	0	0	0	1

Source: Match reports in Competitive matches

== Transfers ==
=== In ===
Pos.	Name	Moving from	Source	Notes
FW	(Brazil) Camanducaia	Guarani		Loan return
MF	(Japan) Sugawara	(Japan) Verdy Kawasaki		
MF	(Brazil) Marcos Assunção	Flamengo		Loan return
FW	(Brazil) Macedo	Coritiba		Loan return
AM	(Brazil) Arinélson	Paraná		Loan return
LB	(Brazil) Dutra	América Mineiro		Loan return
GK	(Brazil) Edinho	Ponte Preta		Loan return
AM	(Brazil) Fumagalli	(Japan) Verdy Kawasaki		Loan return
AM	(Brazil) Caíco	Atlético Paranaense		Loan return
DF/MF	(Brazil) Claudiomiro	Coritiba		Acquired
ST	(Brazil) Rodrigão	Youth system		Promoted
AM	(Brazil) Rodrigo Fabri	Flamengo		On loan
DF	(Brazil) Andrei	(Spain) Real Betis		On loan
DF	(Brazil) Valdir	Youth system		Promoted
DM	(Brazil) Narciso	Flamengo		Loan return
FW	(Brazil) / (Germany) Paulo Rink	(Germany) Bayer Leverkusen		On loan
DM	(Brazil) Élson	União Barbarense		
CB	(Brazil) Marcelo Heleno	Francana		
ST	(Brazil) Dodô	São Paulo		
GK	(Brazil) Nei	Corinthians		
AM	(Brazil) Aílton	Youth system		Promoted
DM	(Brazil) Marcelo Silva	Juventus		
AM	(Brazil) Fumagalli	América–SP		Loan return
AM	(Brazil) Arinélson	Guarani		Loan return
DF	(Brazil) Claudio	(Japan) Bellmare Hiratsuka		On loan
LB	(Ecuador) Fricson George	(Ecuador) Barcelona		On loan
RB	(Brazil) Ceará	Youth system		Promoted
FW	(Brazil) Deivid	Jaraguá		

=== Out ===
Pos.	Name	Moving to	Source	Notes
AM	(Brazil) Róbson Luís	Bahia		Loan return
LB	(Brazil) Athirson	Flamengo		Loan return
GK	(Brazil) Marcelo	América Mineiro		On loan
FW	(Brazil) Macedo	Grêmio		
AM	(Brazil) Fernandes	Portuguesa Santista		
DM	(Brazil) Narciso	Flamengo		On loan
AM	(Brazil) Fumagalli	América–SP		On loan
AM	(Brazil) Messias	Portuguesa		
RB/DM	(Brazil) Baiano	Matonense		On loan
CB	(Brazil) Sandro	Botafogo		On loan
AM	(Japan) Maezono	Goiás		
LB	(Brazil) Dutra	Coritiba		On loan
AM	(Brazil) Arinélson	Guarani		On loan
CB	(Brazil) Argel	(Portugal) Porto		
DM	(Brazil) Élder	Juventude		On loan
FW	(Brazil) Camanducaia	Santa Cruz		On loan
FW	(Brazil) Alessandro	(Portugal) Porto		
MF	(Brazil) Jorginho	Paraná		
GK	(Brazil) Edinho	Retired		
MF	(Brazil) Bechara	Free agent		
DM	(Brazil) Marcos Assunção	(Italy) Roma		
RB/DM	(Brazil) Baiano	Vitória		On loan
ST	(Brazil) Viola	Vasco da Gama		
RB	(Brazil) Ânderson Lima	São Paulo		On loan
AM	(Brazil) Rodrigo Fabri	(Spain) Real Madrid		Loan return
AM	(Brazil) Arinélson	Fluminense		
FW	(Colombia) Aristizábal	Free agent		
MF	(Japan) Sugawara	Free agent		

== Friendlies ==
31 July Amsterdam Tournament	Ajax (Netherlands)	1 – 4	Santos	Amsterdam
	Arveladze 71'	Report	11' Aílton; 13', 52' Dodô; 80' Aristizábal	Stadium: Amsterdam ArenA; Referee: Jan Wegereef

1 August Amsterdam Tournament	Atlético Madrid (Spain)	0 – 0 (4–5 p)	Santos	Amsterdam
		Report		Stadium: Amsterdam ArenA; Referee: J. Hulter
	Penalties
	Cubillo (penalty scored); Luque (penalty scored); Molina (penalty scored); Zahínos (penalty scored); Ivo (penalty missed)		(penalty scored) Andrei; (penalty scored) Michel; (penalty scored) Gustavo Nery; (penalty scored) Dodô; (penalty scored) Lúcio

3 August Trofeo Hispalis	Sevilla (Spain)	1 – 0	Santos	Sevilla
	Quevedo 37'	Report		Stadium: Ramón Sánchez Pizjuán; Attendance: 7,000; Referee: Carmona Méndez

5 August Trofeo Hispalis	Parma (Italy)	2 – 1	Santos	Sevilla
	Montaño 12'; Di Vaio 69'	Report	36' Paulo Rink	Stadium: Ramón Sánchez Pizjuán; Attendance: 6,000; Referee: Luis Medina Cantalejo

23 October Friendly	Jaraguá	3 – 3	Santos	Jaraguá do Sul
	Adriano 5', 38' (pen.); Vilmar 80'	Report	14' Dodô; 89' Fumagalli; 90+1' Deivid	Stadium: João Marcatto; Referee: Osvaldo Meira Júnior

== Competitions ==
=== Overall summary ===
Competition	Started round	Final position / round	First match	Last match
Campeonato Brasileiro	—	11th	25 July	10 November
Campeonato Paulista	Second stage	Semi-final	7 March	8 June
Copa do Brasil	First round	Second round	10 February	31 March
Torneio Rio-São Paulo	Group stage	Runners-up	23 January	3 March

Source: Competitions

=== Campeonato Brasileiro ===
==== Results summary ====
Overall								Home						Away					
Pld	W	D	L	GF	GA	GD	Pts	W	D	L	GF	GA	GD	W	D	L	GF	GA	GD
21	8	6	7	25	26	−1	30	4	4	3	17	15	+2	4	2	4	8	11	−3

Source: Acervo Santista

==== First stage ====
Pos	Team	Pld	W	D	L	GF	GA	GD	Pts
9	Atlético Paranaense	21	9	4	8	36	31	+5	31
10	Palmeiras	21	8	7	6	36	23	+13	31
11	Santos	21	8	6	7	25	26	−1	30
12	Flamengo	21	9	2	10	30	33	−3	29
13	Coritiba	21	7	8	6	31	29	+2	29

Source: RSSSF
Rules for classification: 1) points; 2) goal difference; 3) number of goals scored.

===== Matches =====
25 July 1	Paraná	0 – 2	Santos	Curitiba
15:15		Report	1' Dodô; 11' Aristizábal	Stadium: Vila Olímpica; Attendance: 6,781; Referee: Márcio Rezende de Freitas

28 July 2	Santos	3 – 2	São Paulo	Santos
21:40	Jean 14'; Aílton 47'; Dodô 83'	Report	12' França; 54' Emerson Sheik	Stadium: Vila Belmiro; Attendance: 10,719; Referee: Sálvio Spínola

7 August 3	Santos	0 – 0	Vitória	Santos
16:00		Report		Stadium: Vila Belmiro; Attendance: 5,638; Referee: Reinaldo Ribas Vieira

14 August 4	Atlético Paranaense	3 – 0	Santos	Curitiba
16:00	Lucas 33'; Vanin 40'; Kelly 90+2'	Report		Stadium: Arena da Baixada; Attendance: 19,816; Referee: Antônio Pereira da Silva

18 August 5	Gama	0 – 0	Santos	Brasília
20:30		Report		Stadium: Estádio Mané Garrincha; Attendance: 5,002; Referee: Francisco Dacildo Mourão

22 August 6	Santos	1 – 2	Guarani	Santos
16:00	Fumagalli 66'	Report	14' Marcinho; 56' Valdir Souza	Stadium: Vila Belmiro; Attendance: 4,758; Referee: Edílson Pereira de Carvalho

28 August 7	Santos	1 – 1	Vasco da Gama	Santos
16:00	Dodô 46'	Report	41' Juninho Pernambucano	Stadium: Vila Belmiro; Attendance: 8,398; Referee: Wilson de Souza Mendonça

4 September 8	Sport	1 – 0	Santos	Recife
18:30	Márcio Goiano 40'	Report		Stadium: Ilha do Retiro; Attendance: 10,796; Referee: Carlos Eugênio Simon

11 September 9	Santos	2 – 0	Botafogo–SP	Santos
16:00	Rodrigão 72', 76'	Report		Stadium: Vila Belmiro; Attendance: 2,324; Referee: Alfredo dos Santos Loebeling

15 September 10	Portuguesa	1 – 2	Santos	Santos
20:30	Aílton 5'	Report	55' Claudio; 56' Gustavo Nery	Stadium: Vila Belmiro; Attendance: 7,069; Referee: Oscar Roberto de Godói

18 September 11	Santos	0 – 1	Botafogo	Santos
16:00		Report	53' Sandro	Stadium: Vila Belmiro; Attendance: 12,502; Referee: Luciano Augusto de Almeida

26 September 12	Palmeiras	1 – 1	Santos	São Paulo
17:00	Evair 67'	Report	54' (pen.) Dodô	Stadium: Parque Antártica; Referee: Romildo Correia

29 September 13	Santos	1 – 1	Coritiba	Santos
21:40	Dodô 20'	Report	42' (pen.) Cléber	Stadium: Vila Belmiro; Referee: Wilson de Souza Mendonça

2 October 14	Internacional	1 – 2	Santos	Porto Alegre
16:00	Celso 3'	Report	67' Élson; 82' Dodô	Stadium: Estádio Beira-Rio; Attendance: 6,285; Referee: Léo Feldman

6 October 15	Atlético Mineiro	2 – 0	Santos	Belo Horizonte
21:40	Robert 54', 80'	Report		Stadium: Mineirão; Attendance: 33,601; Referee: Jorge dos Santos Travassos

9 October 16	Ponte Preta	2 – 0	Santos	Campinas
16:00	Piá 38'; Vaguinho 88'	Report		Stadium: Moisés Lucarelli; Attendance: 15,368; Referee: Edílson Pereira de Carvalho

13 October 17	Santos	1 – 4	Corinthians	Santos
21:40	Dodô 66'	Report	15' Nenê; 60' Luizão; 63' Ricardinho; 78' Kléber	Stadium: Vila Belmiro; Attendance: 15,599; Referee: Sálvio Spínola

17 October 18	Santos	3 – 0	Juventude	Santos
17:00	Dodô 32', 64', 66'	Report		Stadium: Vila Belmiro; Attendance: 1,896; Referee: Wilson de Souza Mendonça

30 October 19	Santos	2 – 1	Grêmio	Santos
18:30	Dodô 66'; Eduardo Marques 78'	Report	63' Magrão	Stadium: Vila Belmiro; Attendance: 5,772; Referee: Wilson de Souza Mendonça

7 November 20	Flamengo	0 – 1	Santos	Rio de Janeiro
17:00		Report	77' Dodô	Stadium: Estádio do Maracanã; Attendance: 62,235; Referee: Carlos Eugênio Simon

10 November 21	Santos	3 – 3	Cruzeiro	Santos
21:40	Deivid 48', 60'; Dodô 71' (pen.)	Report	56' Geovanni; 66' (pen.), 67' Alex Alves	Stadium: Vila Belmiro; Attendance: 6,922; Referee: Carlos Eugênio Simon

=== Copa do Brasil ===
==== First round ====
10 February First leg	Sinop	0 – 1	Santos	Sinop
21:40		Report	45+2' Rodrigão	Stadium: Gigante do Norte; Attendance: 2,981; Referee: Edvaldo Batista de Araújo

10 March Second leg	Santos	6 – 0 (7 – 0 agg.)	Sinop	Santos
21:40	Viola 8', 43', 54', 66', 86'; Ânderson Lima 45+1'	Report		Stadium: Vila Belmiro; Attendance: 5,054; Referee: Wagner Tardelli de Azevedo

==== Second round ====
17 March First leg	Goiás	1 – 2	Santos	Goiânia
20:30	Álvaro 82'	Report	44' Gustavo Nery; 45+2' Viola	Stadium: Serra Dourada; Attendance: 11,734; Referee: Wilson de Souza Mendonça

31 March Second leg	Santos	3 – 4 (5 – 5 agg.)	Goiás	Santos
21:40	Rodrigão 40', 48'; Marcos Assunção 64'	Report	42', 89' Araújo; 62', 69' Aloísio	Stadium: Vila Belmiro; Attendance: 4,109; Referee: Fabiano Gonçalves

=== Campeonato Paulista ===
==== Second stage ====
===== Group 4 =====
Group 4
Pos	Team	Pld	W	D	L	GF	GA	GD	Pts
1	Santos	16	9	4	3	37	22	+15	31
2	Corinthians	16	8	2	6	18	13	+5	26
3	União Barbarense	16	6	3	7	29	26	+3	21
4	Mogi Mirim	16	4	5	7	18	32	−14	17
5	Guarani	16	3	3	10	21	32	−11	12
6	Portuguesa Santista	16	1	3	12	11	39	−28	6

Updated to match(es) played on 30 May 1999. Source: RSSSF Brasil

===== Matches =====
7 March 1	Palmeiras	1 – 1	Santos	São Paulo
16:00	Júnior Baiano 70'	Report	39' Alessandro	Stadium: Morumbi; Attendance: 7,015; Referee: Alfredo dos Santos Loebeling

13 March 2	Santos	1 – 1	Matonense	Santos
16:00	Claudiomiro 84'	Report	6' (pen.) Piá	Stadium: Vila Belmiro; Referee: Sidrack Marinho

20 March 3	Portuguesa	1 – 2	Santos	São Paulo
16:00	Leandro Amaral 10'	Report	6' Jorginho; 34' Marcos Assunção	Stadium: Canindé; Attendance: 18,600; Referee: Paulo César de Oliveira

24 March 4	Santos	1 – 2	São Paulo	São Paulo
20:30	Gustavo Nery 31'	Report	26' Marcelinho Paraíba; 51' Dodô	Stadium: Pacaembu; Attendance: 19,150; Referee: Sidrack Marinho

27 March 5	Rio Branco	1 – 2	Santos	Americana
16:00	Marcos Teixeira 83'	Report	14' Rodrigão; 63' Marcos Assunção	Stadium: Décio Vitta; Attendance: 7,829; Referee: Edílson Pereira de Carvalho

3 April 6	Santos	6 – 2	Inter de Limeira	Santos
16:00	Andrei 8'; Rodrigo Fabri 20'; Rodrigão 35'; Jorginho 45', 76'; Narciso 62'	Report	49', 54' Alexandre Gaúcho	Stadium: Vila Belmiro; Attendance: 5,204; Referee: Oscar Roberto de Godói

11 April 7	Santos	5 – 1	Portuguesa Santista	Santos
11:00	Narciso 32', 62'; Marcos Assunção 65'; Rodrigão 70'; Aristizábal 81'	Report	73' Fernandes	Stadium: Vila Belmiro; Attendance: 5,063; Referee: Flávio de Carvalho

17 April 8	União Barbarense	2 – 0	Santos	Santa Bárbara d'Oeste
16:00	Edinan 54'; Maguinho 90+1'	Report		Stadium: Antônio Lins Ribeiro Guimarães; Attendance: 4,874; Referee: Antonio Claudio Perin

21 April 9	Mogi Mirim	0 – 2	Santos	Mogi Mirim
16:00		Report	7' Alessandro; 13' Rodrigão	Stadium: Wilson de Barros; Referee: Romildo Correia

25 April 10	Santos	4 – 2	Corinthians	Santos
16:00	Gustavo Nery 4'; Viola 64'; Ânderson Lima 75'; Narciso 87'	Report	37' Ricardinho; 61' Dinei	Stadium: Vila Belmiro; Referee: Flávio de Carvalho

1 May 11	Guarani	0 – 1	Santos	Campinas
16:00		Report	17' Viola	Stadium: Brinco de Ouro; Attendance: 9,503; Referee: Paulo César de Oliveira

5 May 12	Portuguesa Santista	1 – 6	Santos	Santos
15:00	Gino 14'	Report	26', 53', 76' Viola; 35' Gustavo Nery; 37' Ânderson Lima; 70' Argel	Stadium: Ulrico Mursa; Attendance: 2,250; Referee: Sálvio Spínola

9 May 13	Santos	2 – 2	União Barbarense	Santos
18:30	Viola 15'; Alessandro 90'	Report	20' Wilson; 66' Edinan	Stadium: Vila Belmiro; Attendance: 7,995; Referee: Oscar Roberto de Godói

16 May 14	Santos	1 – 1	Mogi Mirim	Santos
11:00	Gustavo Nery 37'	Report	22' (pen.) Alex Fernandes	Stadium: Vila Belmiro; Attendance: 5,115; Referee: Vladimir Vassoler

23 May 15	Corinthians	5 – 1	Santos	São Paulo
16:00	Marcelinho Carioca 29', 83' (pen.), 85'; Edílson 32'; Amaral 90+1'	Report	21' Alessandro	Stadium: Morumbi; Referee: Paulo César de Oliveira

30 May 16	Santos	2 – 0	Guarani	Santos
17:00	Viola 12'; Paulo Rink 30'	Report		Stadium: Vila Belmiro; Referee: Roberto Garbini Filho

==== Knockout stage ====
===== Semi-finals =====
5 June First leg	Palmeiras	1 – 2	Santos	São Paulo
18:30	Júnior Baiano 62'	Report	17' Argel; 56' Viola	Stadium: Estádio do Morumbi; Attendance: 17,320; Referee: Flávio de Carvalho

8 June Second leg	Santos	1 – 2 (3 – 3 agg.)	Palmeiras	São Paulo
20:30	Viola 30'	Report	80' Oséas; 82' Paulo Nunes	Stadium: Estádio do Morumbi; Referee: Sálvio Spínola

=== Torneiro Rio-São Paulo ===
==== Group stage ====
Group A
Pos	Team	Pld	W	D	L	GF	GA	GD	Pts
1	Santos	6	3	1	2	13	8	+5	10
2	Vasco da Gama	6	3	1	2	12	8	+4	10
3	Fluminense	6	3	0	3	11	10	+1	9
4	Palmeiras	6	2	0	4	7	17	−10	6

Updated to match(es) played on 17 February 1999. Source: Bola na Área

===== Matches =====
23 January 1	Fluminense	0 – 2	Santos	Rio de Janeiro
16:00		Report	35', 76' Marcos Assunção	Stadium: Maracanã; Attendance: 10,609; Referee: Edílson Pereira de Carvalho

27 January 2	Santos	3 – 1	Palmeiras	Santos
20:30	Jorginho 10'; Rodrigão 46'; Alessandro 75'	Report	12' Neném	Stadium: Vila Belmiro; Referee: Cláudio Vinícius Cerdeira

30 January 3	Santos	0 – 0	Vasco da Gama	Santos
16:00		Report		Stadium: Vila Belmiro; Attendance: 8,242; Referee: Léo Feldman

3 February 4	Santos	4 – 1	Fluminense	Santos
20:30	Alessandro 33'; Dutra 34'; Argel 48'; Caíco 78'	Report	60' Túlio	Stadium: Vila Belmiro; Attendance: 9,218; Referee: Jorge Fernando Rabello

6 February 5	Vasco da Gama	3 – 2	Santos	Rio de Janeiro
16:00	Felipe 62' (pen.); Paulo Miranda 69'; Guilherme 81'	Report	25' Eduardo Marques; 40' Marcos Assunção	Stadium: São Januário; Attendance: 14,618; Referee: Oscar Roberto Godói

17 February 6	Palmeiras	3 – 2	Santos	São Paulo
20:30	Júnior 67'; Viola 80' (o.g.); Juliano 90+2'	Report	37', 73' (pen.) Viola	Stadium: Parque Antártica; Attendance: 4,067; Referee: Jorge dos Santos Travasso

==== Knockout stage ====
===== Semi-finals =====
21 February First leg	Santos	1 – 0	Botafogo	São Paulo
18:30	Marcos Assunção 51'	Report		Stadium: Morumbi; Attendance: 11,064; Referee: Reinaldo Ribas

24 February Second leg	Botafogo	0 – 2 (0 – 3 agg.)	Santos	Rio de Janeiro
21:40		Report	9' Alessandro; 39' Viola	Stadium: Maracanã; Attendance: 32,300; Referee: Alfredo dos Santos Loebeling

===== Final =====
28 February First leg	Vasco da Gama	3 – 1	Santos	Rio de Janeiro
18:30	Mauro Galvão 16'; Juninho Pernambucano 66'; Zezinho 71'	Report	20' Alessandro	Stadium: Maracanã; Attendance: 81,421; Referee: Paulo César de Oliveira

3 March Second leg	Santos	1 – 2 (2 – 5 agg.)	Vasco da Gama	São Paulo
21:40	Alessandro 46'	Report	45+1' Zé Maria; 74' Juninho Pernambucano	Stadium: Morumbi; Attendance: 32,495; Referee: Cláudio Vinícius Cerdeira

=== Qualification to Libertadores ===
==== First round ====
13 November First leg	Grêmio	2 – 1	Santos	Porto Alegre
15:30	Agnaldo 6'; Cleisson 70'	Report	43' Aílton	Stadium: Olímpico; Attendance: 13,375; Referee: Álvaro Azeredo Quelhas

17 November Second leg	Santos	0 – 1 (1 – 3 agg.)	Grêmio	Santos
21:40		Report	78' Itaqui	Stadium: Vila Belmiro; Referee: Cláudio Vinícius Cerdeira
