= Ayupe =

Brazilian footballer (born 1969)

Personal information
- Full name: Marco Aurélio Ayupe
- Date of birth: 25 April 1969 (age 57)
- Place of birth: São João Nepomuceno, Brazil
- Positions: Defender; midfielder

Youth career
- –1987: Vasco da Gama

Senior career*
Years	Team	Apps	(Gls)
1988–1993	Vasco da Gama		
1991–1992	→ Bragantino (loan)		
1993	→ Bragantino (loan)		
1994	Grêmio	74	(8)
1995	Mogi Mirim		
1995	Sport Recife		
1996	Portuguesa		
1996–1997	Corinthians	16	(0)
1997	Bragantino		
1998	Portuguesa Santista		
1999	São José-SP		
1999–2001	Comercial-SP		
2002	America-RJ		
- * Club domestic league appearances and goals as of 9 November 2023

Marco Aurélio Ayupe (born 25 April 1969), simply known as Ayupe, is a Brazilian former professional footballer who played as a defender and midfielder.

== Career ==
Right back and midfielder, Ayupe was part of great Brazilian football squads, such as Vasco, Brazilian champion in 1989, Grêmio in 1994 and Portuguesa, Brazilian runner-up in 1996.

== Honours ==
Vasco da Gama

- Campeonato Brasileiro: 1989

Grêmio

- Copa do Brasil: 1994

Mogi Mirim

- Campeonato Paulista Série A2: 1995

Corinthians

- Campeonato Paulista: 1997
