= Gilmar Fubá =

Brazilian footballer (1975–2021)

Personal information
- Full name: Gilmar de Lima Nascimento
- Date of birth: 13 August 1975
- Place of birth: São Paulo, Brazil
- Date of death: 15 March 2021 (aged 45)
- Place of death: São Paulo, Brazil
- Height: 1.78 m (5 ft 10 in)
- Position: Midfielder

Senior career*
Years	Team	Apps	(Gls)
1996–2000	Corinthians		
- Fluminense
- Rio Branco
- Portuguesa Santista
- Schalke 04
- Ulsan Hyundai
- Criciúma
- Al Ahli
- Noroeste
2008	Red Bull Brasil		
2011	Santa Helena		
- * Club domestic league appearances and goals

Gilmar de Lima Nascimento, known as Gilmar Fubá or Gilmar (13 August 1975 – 15 March 2021) was a Brazilian professional footballer who played as a midfielder.

== Career ==
Born in São Paulo, Gilmar Fubá began his career with Corinthians. He later played for Fluminense, Rio Branco, Portuguesa Santista, FC Schalke 04, Ulsan Hyundai, Criciúma, Al Ahli, Noroeste and Red Bull Brasil. In February 2011 he was one of five players sacked by Santa Helena.

He died on 15 March 2021, aged 45, having been suffering from bone marrow cancer.
