= Kennedy Nagoli =

Zimbabwean footballer (born 1973)

Personal information
- Full name: Kennedy Nagoli
- Date of birth: 24 May 1973 (age 53)
- Place of birth: Kwekwe, Rhodesia
- Position: Midfielder

Senior career*
Years	Team	Apps	(Gls)
1991–1995	Jomo Cosmos	?	(?)
1995–1997	Santos	?	(?)
1997–2002	Aris	116	(7)
2002–2003	PAS Giannina	10	(1)
2003–2004	Enosis Neon Paralimni	31	(6)
2004–2006	AEK Larnaca	15	(2)

International career
1991–2001	Zimbabwe	8	(2)
- * Club domestic league appearances and goals as of February 2008

Kennedy Nagoli, also known as Nagoli Kennedy (born 24 May 1973 in Harare) is a former Zimbabwean footballer. He played as a midfielder.

== Career ==
In career (1991–2006) has played for Jomo Cosmos, Santos, Aris, PAS Giannina, Enosis Neon Paralimni and AEK Larnaca. With Under-23 Zimbabwean national football team he played All-Africa Games in Egypt (1991), when Zimbabwe was 4th. He went to Santos after Pelé met Nelson Mandela in South Africa.

== Career statistics ==
=== International ===
Appearances and goals by national team and year
National team	Year	Apps	Goals
Zimbabwe	1991	1	1
Zimbabwe	1992	–	
Zimbabwe	1993	–	
Zimbabwe	1994	2	1
Zimbabwe	1995	2	0
Zimbabwe	1996	1	0
Zimbabwe	1997	–	
Zimbabwe	1998	–	
Zimbabwe	1999	–	
Zimbabwe	2000	–	
Zimbabwe	2001	2	0
Total		8	2

Scores and results list Zimbabwe's goal tally first, score column indicates score after each Nagoli goal.

List of international goals scored by Kennedy Nagoli
No.	Date	Venue	Opponent	Score	Result	Competition
1	27 July 1991	Zomba Stadium, Zomba, Malawi	Malawi	1–0	2–2	1992 Africa Cup of Nations qualification
2	4 September 1994	National Sports Stadium, Harare, Zimbabwe	Lesotho	1–0	5–0	1996 Africa Cup of Nations qualification
