= Raúl Molina (footballer) =

Spanish footballer

Personal information
- Full name: Raúl Molina Alcocer
- Date of birth: 25 November 1976 (age 49)
- Place of birth: Jerez de la Frontera, Spain
- Height: 1.74 m (5 ft 9 in)
- Position: Forward

Youth career
- Flamenco
- Sanluqueño
- Almería

Senior career*
| Years | Team | Apps | (Gls) |
| 1995–1996 | Utrera | 20 | (4) |
| 1996–1999 | Xerez | 39 | (15) |
| 1997 | → Zaragoza B (loan) | | |
| 1997–1998 | → Rota (loan) | 24 | (20) |
| 1999–2001 | Atlético Madrid B | 62 | (18) |
| 2001–2003 | Recreativo | 74 | (25) |
| 2003–2004 | Espanyol | 12 | (1) |
| 2004 | → Recreativo (loan) | 20 | (6) |
| 2004–2005 | Xerez | 18 | (2) |
| 2005–2007 | Rayo Vallecano | 20 | (3) |
| 2006 | → Albacete (loan) | 4 | (0) |
| 2007–2008 | Portuense | 12 | (0) |
| Total | | 305 | (94) |

Managerial career
- 2010–2011: Recreativo B (assistant)
- * Club domestic league appearances and goals

Raúl Molina Alcocer (born 25 November 1976 in Jerez de la Frontera, Province of Cádiz, Andalusia) is a Spanish former footballer who played as a forward.
