= Estádio Ícaro de Castro Melo =

Football stadium in São Paulo, Brazil

Coordinates: 23°34′41.4″S 46°39′16.1″W

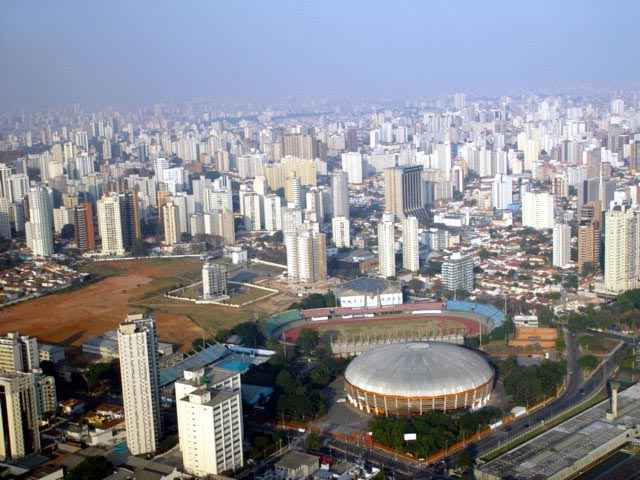
Aerial view of the stadium

The Estádio Ícaro de Castro Melo is a stadium in São Paulo, Brazil, located near Ibirapuera Park, beside Ginásio do Ibirapuera, which is why it is also known as Estádio do Ibirapuera and Pista de Atletismo do Ibirapuera. It has a capacity of 13,000 people.

In 2007, the Pan American Junior Athletics Championships were held in this venue.
