= Curê =

Brazilian footballer (born 1969)

Personal information
- Full name: Carlos Antônio Chaves
- Date of birth: 14 June 1969 (age 57)
- Place of birth: Foz do Iguaçu, Brazil
- Position: Forward

Youth career
- –1990: Guarani

Senior career*
| Years | Team | Apps | (Gls) |
| 1990 | Guarani | | |
| 1991 | Rio Branco-SP | | |
| 1992–1993 | Cerro Porteño | | |
| 1994 | Olimpia | | |
| 1995 | Foz do Iguaçu EC | | |
| 1996–1997 | Rio Branco-SP | | |
| 1997 | Portuguesa | | |
| 1998 | Araçatuba | | |
| 1998 | Ponte Preta | | |
| 1998 | Vila Nova | | |
| 1999 | Portuguesa Santista | | |
| 1999 | Atlético Mineiro | 26 | (5) |
| 2000 | Bahia | | |
| 2001 | Mogi Mirim | | |
| 2002 | Joinville | | |
| 2003 | Corinthians-AL | | |
| 2004 | Santa Cruz | | |
| 2005 | Caxias-SC | | |
| 2006 | Campinense | | |
- * Club domestic league appearances and goals as of 20 October 2023

Carlos Antônio Chaves (born 14 June 1969), better known as Curê, is a Brazilian former professional footballer who played as a forward.

== Career ==
Started his career in Guarani FC, Curê achieved a great feat by being part of the semi-finalist squad of the 1993 Copa Libertadores with Cerro Porteño. He played for several clubs in Brazil until retiring in 2006.

== Personal life ==
Son of a Paraguayan father, he fulfilled his dream by playing for Cerro Porteño, his favorite club. In 2021 Curê declared himself a fan of Atlético Mineiro, the club for which he was runner-up in Brazil in 1999. He works and lives in Foz do Iguaçu.

== Honours ==
Atlético Mineiro

- Campeonato Mineiro: 1999
