= Cássio Barros =

Brazilian footballer (born 1970)

Personal information
- Full name: Cássio Alves de Barros
- Date of birth: 17 January 1970 (age 56)
- Place of birth: Rio de Janeiro, Brazil
- Height: 1.70 m (5 ft 7 in)
- Position: Defender

Team information
- Current team: Palmas (coach)

Senior career*
| Years | Team | Apps | (Gls) |
| 1989–1997 | Vasco da Gama | 274 | (10) |
| 1995 | → Fluminense (loan) | 23 | (0) |
| 1997 | Santos | 9 | (1) |
| 1998 | Portuguesa | 3 | (0) |
| 1999–2001 | Stuttgarter Kickers | 38 | (3) |
| 2001 | Goiás | 11 | (0) |
| Total | | 358 | (14) |

International career
| 1991 | Brazil | 1 | (0) |

Managerial career
- 2012–2014: Vasco da Gama U17
- 2016: Tigres do Brasil
- 2016: Duque de Caxias
- 2016–2018: Madureira U20
- 2019–: Palmas
- * Club domestic league appearances and goals

Cássio Alves de Barros (born 17 January 1970) is a Brazilian professional football manager and former player.

Cássio scored 10 goals in 274 appearances for Vasco da Gama between 1989 and 1997 and earned his only cap in a friendly between the Brazil national football team and Wales in 1991. Towards the end of his career, Cássio played 33 games for Stuttgarter Kickers in the 2. Bundesliga.

== Honours ==
=== Player ===
Vasco da Gama

- Campeonato Brasileiro: 1989
- Campeonato Carioca: 1992, 1993, 1994
