= Otávio Braga =

Brazilian footballer

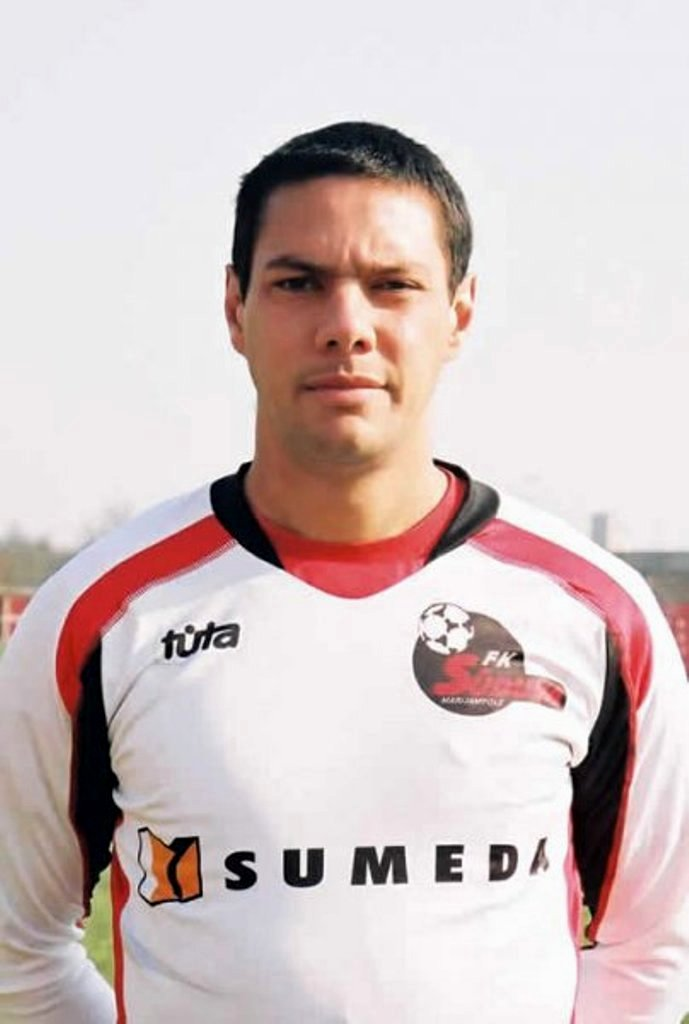
Otavio Braga

Otávio Augusto Braga, commonly known as Otávio Augusto , (born 29 July 1973 in Iacanga, São Paulo) is a former Brazilian footballer (striker) who played for FK Sūduva. He is the youngest son of Emidio T. Braga and Julia T. Braga.

Otávio Augusto started his career as professional football player in Araraquara (São Paulo state) in the traditional Brazilian team, Associação Ferroviária de Esportes, with the master of football, Olivério Bazzani Filho, as his first coach.

Otávio Augusto also played for Joinville, União São João, and Santos in Brazil before being hired by FC Luzern of Switzerland. He started his medical studies in 2007 at Kaunas University of Medicine - Lithuania, after announcing his retirement from professional football as a player.

== Clubs ==
- Associacao Ferroviaria de Esportes - Brazil
- União São João Esporte Clube - Brazil
- Joinville Esporte Clube - Brazil
- Santos Futebol Clube - Brazil
- FC Luzern - Switzerland
- FC Wangen bei Olten - Switzerland
- SV Muttenz - Switzerland
- Società Sportiva Verbania Calcio - Italy
- U.S.D. 1913 Seregno Calcio - Italy
- S.S. Villacidrese Calcio - Italy
- A.C. Castellettese - Italy
- FK Sūduva - Lithuania
