= 1999 Amsterdam Tournament =

International football competition

The Amsterdam Tournament is a pre-season football tournament held for club teams from around the world, hosted at the Amsterdam ArenA. The 1999 tournament was contested by Ajax, Atlético Madrid, Lazio and Santos on 31 July and 1 August 1999. Lazio won the tournament.

== Table ==
Team	Pld	W	D	L	GF	GA	GD	Pts
(Italy) Lazio	2	2	0	0	6	3	+3	12
(Brazil) Santos	2	1	1	0	4	1	+3	9 (Note: One point was awarded for a win via a penalty shootout.)
(Netherlands) Ajax	2	0	0	2	3	7	−4	3
(Spain) Atlético Madrid	2	0	1	1	1	3	−2	2

Rules for classification: Three points for a win, two points for a draw, and an extra point was awarded for each goal scored.

== Matches ==
=== Day 1 ===
1999-07-31

Lazio (Italy)	3–1	(Spain) Atlético Madrid
Couto 10'; Lombardo 50'; Inzaghi 90'		Luque 16'

Amsterdam ArenA, Amsterdam

1999-07-31

Ajax (Netherlands)	1–4	(Brazil) Santos
Arveladze 71'		Ailton 11'; Dodô 13', 52'; Valdir 80'

Amsterdam ArenA, Amsterdam

=== Day 2 ===
1999-08-01

Atlético Madrid (Spain)	0–0	(Brazil) Santos
Penalties
	4–5

Amsterdam ArenA, Amsterdam

1999-08-01

Ajax (Netherlands)	2–3	(Italy) Lazio
Knopper 40', 71'		Bokšić 15'; Mihajlović 20' (pen.); Andersson 60'

Amsterdam ArenA, Amsterdam
