= Nei (footballer, born 1971) =

Brazilian footballer

Personal information
- Full name: Valdinei Cunha
- Date of birth: 1 October 1971 (age 55)
- Place of birth: Maringá, Brazil
- Height: 1.90 m (6 ft 3 in)
- Position: Goalkeeper

Youth career
- –1992: Fluminense

Senior career*
Years	Team	Apps	(Gls)
1992–1995	Fluminense	37	(0)
1996–1999	Corinthians	108	(0)
1999–2000	Santos		
2001	Coritiba		
2001	Sport Recife		
- * Club domestic league appearances and goals as of 6 January 2024

Valdinei Cunha (born 1 October 1971), better known as Nei, is a Brazilian former professional footballer who played as a goalkeeper.

== Career ==
As a child, Nei moved from the countryside of the Paraná state with his family, and started in football in the baby tooth categories of Fluminense, a club where he became a professional and made 37 appearances. In 1995 he was involved in the negotiation of Ronaldo Giovanelli and transferred to Corinthians, the club where he was national champion in 1998. He also played for Santos, Coritiba and Sport, his last club. He retired at age 32.

== Honours ==
Fluminense

- Campeonato Carioca: 1995

Corinthians

- Campeonato Brasileiro: 1998
- Campeonato Paulista: 1997, 1999
