= Paulo Jamelli =

Brazilian footballer (born 1974)

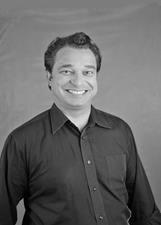

Personal information
- Full name: Paulo Roberto Jamelli Júnior
- Date of birth: 22 July 1974 (age 52)
- Place of birth: São Paulo, Brazil
- Height: 1.78 m (5 ft 10 in)
- Position: Forward

Youth career
- São Paulo

Senior career*
Years	Team	Apps	(Gls)
1993–1994	São Paulo	21	(4)
1994	→ Santa Cruz (loan)		
1995–1996	Santos	95	(22)
1997	Kashiwa Reysol	28	(14)
1998–2002	Zaragoza	107	(24)
2003	Corinthians	19	(3)
2004	Shimizu S-Pulse	3	(0)
2004–2005	Almería	26	(2)
2006	Atlético Mineiro	0	(0)
2007	Grêmio Prudente	1	(0)

International career
1996	Brazil	5	(2)

Managerial career
- 2012: Marcílio Dias
- 2016: Independente de Limeira
- 2016: Mauaense
- * Club domestic league appearances and goals

Paulo Roberto Jamelli Júnior (born 22 July 1974), known as Jamelli, is a Brazilian football coach and former player who played mainly as a forward.

== Career ==
Born in São Paulo, Jamelli made his professional debuts with hometown side São Paulo, appearing in seven Série A games. He first made his presence felt with Santos FC, scoring 13 goals during two seasons.

Having attracted the attention of clubs abroad, Jamelli moved to Kashiwa Reysol in Japan but, in January 1998, switched to Spain's Real Zaragoza as the Aragonese had lost in the previous summer Dani García and Fernando Morientes, both to Real Madrid. Never an undisputed starter, he was almost always a very important attacking element, scoring a career-best 13 La Liga goals in the 2000–01 campaign, precisely the year of the side's conquest of the Copa del Rey, where he netted in the final against Celta de Vigo (3–1).

After Zaragoza's 2002 relegation, Jamelli started off in the second level, but eventually returned to Brazil in January 2003 by joining Corinthians. He ended his career in 2006, after one-season spells with Shimizu S-Pulse, UD Almería, Corinthians, Atlético Mineiro and Grêmio Prudente.

In 2008, Jamelli joined Coritiba as a technical coordinator. However, on 1 April of the following year, he left the post due to personal problems with coach Ivo Wortmann.

== Career statistics ==
=== Club ===
Appearances and goals by club, season and competition
Club	Season	League			National cup (Note: Includes Copa do Brasil, Emperor's Cup, Copa del Rey.)		League cup (Note: Includes J.League Cup.)		Total	
Club	Season	Division	Apps	Goals	Apps	Goals	Apps	Goals	Apps	Goals
São Paulo	1994	Série A	7	0					7	0
Santos	1995	Série A	22	8					22	8
Santos	1996	Série A	19	5					19	5
Santos	Total		41	13					41	13
Kashiwa Reysol	1997	J1 League	28	14	2	1	7	1	37	16
Zaragoza	1997–98	La Liga	16	4					16	4
Zaragoza	1998–99	La Liga	23	4					23	4
Zaragoza	1999–2000	La Liga	15	1					15	1
Zaragoza	2000–01	La Liga	33	13					33	13
Zaragoza	2001–02	La Liga	15	1					15	1
Zaragoza	2002–03	Segunda División	5	1					5	1
Zaragoza	Total		107	24					107	24
Corinthians	2003	Série A	19	3					19	3
Shimizu S-Pulse	2004	J1 League	3	0	0	0	1	0	4	0
Almería	2004–05	Segunda División	26	2					26	2
Career total			231	56	2	1	8	1	241	58

=== International ===
Appearances and goals by national team and year
National team	Year	Apps	Goals
Brazil	1996	6	2
Total		6	2

Scores and results list Brazil's goal tally first, score column indicates score after each Jamelli goal.

List of international goals scored by Paulo Jamelli
No.	Date	Venue	Opponent	Score	Result	Competition	Ref.
1	14 January 1996	Los Angeles Memorial Coliseum, Los Angeles, United States	Honduras	2–0	5–0	1996 CONCACAF Gold Cup	
2	14 January 1996	Los Angeles Memorial Coliseum, Los Angeles, United States	Honduras	3–0	5–0	1996 CONCACAF Gold Cup	

== Honours ==
Zaragoza

- Copa del Rey: 2000–01

== Personal life ==
In 2014, he ran for the office of state deputy in São Paulo as a candidate for the Communist Party of Brazil (PCdoB). He received just over 2,000 votes and was not elected to the position.
