= Arinélson =

Brazilian footballer (born 1973)

Personal information
- Full name: Arinélson Freire Nunes
- Date of birth: 27 January 1973 (age 53)
- Place of birth: Brazil
- Position: Midfielder

Senior career*
Years	Team	Apps	(Gls)
1996	Tuna Luso		
1996	Iraty	19	(14)
1997–1998	Santos	39	(8)
1998	Flamengo	2	(0)
1998	Paraná	15	(4)
1999	Santos	1	(0)
1999	Guarani	8	(0)
1999	Fluminense	14	(4)
2000	America-RJ	13	(3)
2001	Matonense	5	(0)
2001	Jeonbuk	11	(2)
2002	Ulsan	8	(0)
2003	Olaria		
2004	Paysandu		
2005	Remo	2	(0)
2006	Bandeirante		
2007	Inter de Limeira	2	(0)
2007–2008	Ananindeua		
2009	Tuna Luso		
2010	Sergipe		
2010	Tuna Luso		
- * Club domestic league appearances and goals

Arinélson Freire Nunes (born 21 January 1973) is a Brazilian former footballer who played as a midfielder.

== Early life ==
He was born in 1973 in Brazil. He played futsal as a child.

== Career ==
He started his career with Brazilian side Tuna Luso. In 1996, he signed for Brazilian side Iraty. In 1997, he signed for Brazilian side Santos. In 1998, he signed for Brazilian side Flamengo. After that, he signed for Brazilian side Paraná. In 1999, he returned to Brazilian side Santos. After that, he signed for Brazilian side Guarani. After that, he signed for Brazilian side Fluminense. In 2000, he signed for Brazilian side America-RJ. In 2001, he signed for Brazilian side Matonense. After that, he signed for South Korean side Jeonbuk. In 2002, he signed for South Korean side Ulsan. In 2003, he signed for Brazilian side Olaria. In 2004, he signed for Brazilian side Paysandu. In 2005, he signed for Brazilian side Remo. In 2006, he signed for Brazilian side Bandeirante. In 2007, he signed for Brazilian side Inter de Limeira. After that, he signed for Brazilian side Ananindeua. In 2009, he signed for Brazilian side Tuna Luso. In 2010, he signed for Brazilian side Sergipe. After that, he returned to Brazilian side Tuna Luso.

== Style of play ==
He mainly operated as a midfielder. He was left-footed. He was known for his dribbling ability.

== Personal life ==
After retiring from professional football, he worked in the real estate industry. He is the father of Brazilian footballer Alessandro Lucas.
