= Camanducaia (footballer) =

Brazilian footballer

Personal information
- Full name: Marcelo Fernando Domingues Rezende
- Date of birth: 8 May 1976 (age 50)
- Place of birth: Camanducaia, Minas Gerais, Brazil
- Height: 1.70 m (5 ft 7 in)
- Position: Forward

Youth career
- –1994: Santos

Senior career*
Years	Team	Apps	(Gls)
1994–1998	Santos		
1996–1997	→ Portuguesa Santista (loan)		
1997	→ Bahia (loan)		
1998	→ Guarani (loan)		
1999	Santa Cruz		
2000–2001	Figueirense		
2001–2002	Tigres UANL		
2002	Santos Laguna		
2003	Paulista		
2003	Marília		
2004	Baniyas Club		
2004	Santo André		
2005	Ceará		
2005	15 de Novembro		
2006–2007	Ipatinga		
2008–2009	Uberaba		
2010	Grêmio Osasco		
2011	Nacional-NS		
2011	Santo André		
- * Club domestic league appearances and goals as of 11 October 2023

Marcelo Fernando Domingues Rezende (born 8 May 1976), commonly known as Camanducaia after his birthplace, is a former Brazilian football forward

== Career ==
Formed in the Santos youth system, Camanducaia rose to fame in 1995 when he became a runner-up of the 1995 Campeonato Brasileiro with the Peixe, having a goal controversially disallowed in the final against Botafogo. After what happened, he was no longer able to perform like he did in his debut year, and walked around several clubs discreetly.

== Honours ==
Uberaba

- Taça Minas Gerais: 2009
