= Edgar Báez =

Paraguayan footballer (born 1972)

Personal information
- Full name: Edgar Feliciano Báez Fernández
- Date of birth: 21 March 1972 (age 54)
- Place of birth: Asunción, Paraguay
- Height: 1.78 m (5 ft 10 in)
- Position: Striker

Senior career*
Years	Team	Apps	(Gls)
1992	12 de Octubre		
1992–1994	Guaraní		
1994–1995	Huracán		
1995–1996	Guaraní		
1996–1999	Santos		
1998	→ Al Hilal (loan)		
1999–2001	Cerro Porteño		
2002–2003	Sol de América		
2004	Tacuary		

International career
1996	Paraguay	1	(0)
- * Club domestic league appearances and goals

Edgar Feliciano Báez Fernández (born 21 March 1972 in Asunción, Paraguay) is a former footballer who played for clubs in Paraguay, Argentina and Brazil. Báez played once in a World Cup qualifying match for Paraguay in 1996.

== Honours and achievements ==
Santos

- Torneio Rio – São Paulo: 1997
