= Vágner (footballer, born 1973) =

Brazilian footballer

Personal information
- Full name: Vágner Rogério Nunes
- Date of birth: 19 March 1973 (age 53)
- Place of birth: Bauru, Brazil
- Height: 1.76 m (5 ft 9 in)
- Position: Midfielder

Senior career*
Years	Team	Apps	(Gls)
1989	Arapongas		
1990–1993	Lousano Paulista		
1993–1995	União São João	33	(3)
1995–1997	Santos	27	(3)
1997–1998	Roma	11	(0)
1998–1999	Vasco da Gama	12	(0)
2000	São Paulo	11	(1)
2000–2004	Celta	89	(6)
2005	Atlético Mineiro		

International career
2001	Brazil	1	(0)
- * Club domestic league appearances and goals

Vágner Rogério Nunes (born 19 March 1973), known simply as Vágner, is a Brazilian former footballer who played as a defensive midfielder.

The bulk of his professional career was spent in Spain, with Celta.

== Club career ==
Born in Bauru, São Paulo, Vágner played professionally in his country for Lousano Paulista, União São João, Santos, Vasco da Gama, São Paulo and Atlético Mineiro, having already represented four clubs in ten years.

In 1997, he had an unsuccessful spell in Italy for Roma, eventually settling in Spain with Celta de Vigo. He played 23 games as the Galician team finished fourth in La Liga in 2003, but was relegated in the following year.

After his move to Atlético Mineiro, Vágner retired from football at the age of 32.

== International career ==
Vágner represented Brazil at the 2001 FIFA Confederations Cup; his sole cap came as he played the first 45 minutes of the group stage win against Cameroon (2–0), in an eventual fourth-place finish.
