= Teixeirão =

Soccer stadium in São José do Rio Preto, Brazil

Coordinates: 20°47′50″S 49°21′32″W

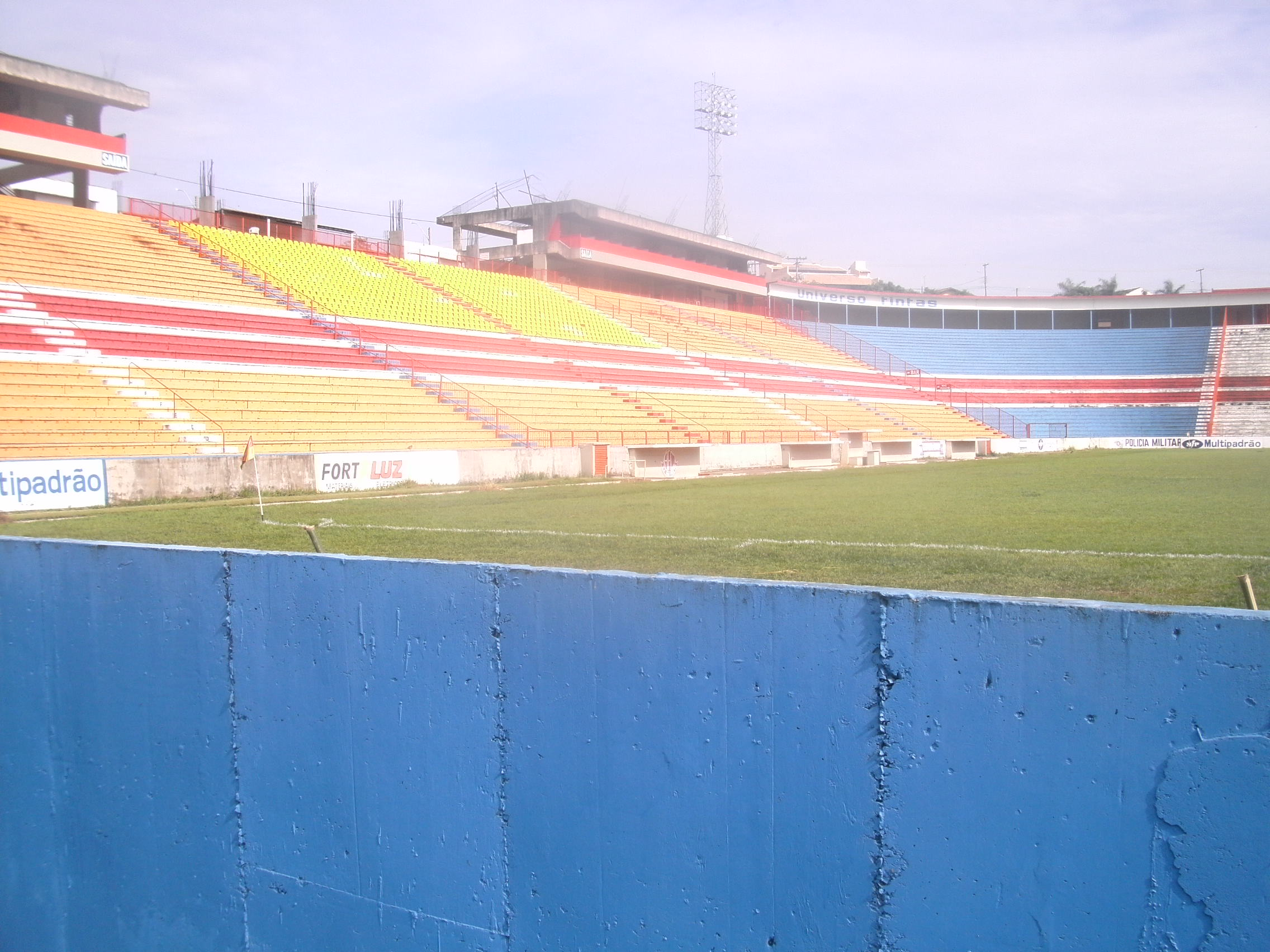
- Sisbrace
- Interactive map of Teixeirão
- Full name: Estádio Benedito Teixeira
- Location: São José do Rio Preto, SP, Brazil
- Owner: América-SP
- Capacity: 32,168
- Surface: Natural grass
- Field size: 105 by 68 metres (114.8 yd × 74.4 yd)

Construction
- Opened: 1996

Tenant
- América-SP

Estádio Benedito Teixeira, usually known as Teixeirão, is a multi-purpose stadium in São José do Rio Preto, São Paulo State, Brazil. It is currently used mostly for football matches. The stadium holds 32,168 people. It was built in 1996. The stadium is owned by América Futebol Clube, and its formal name honours Benedito Teixeira, who was a player, and a president of América Futebol Clube for 23 years.

== History ==
The inaugural match was played on February 10, 1996, when São Paulo beat América (SP) 3–2 in front of 17,585 people. The first goal of the stadium was scored by São Paulo's Valdir.

On March 28, 1996, the first ever Brazil Olympic team match was played in São José do Rio Preto city. The match, which was against the Ghana national football team, ended 8–2 to Brazil. Marques, who scored three goals, was the man of the match.
