= Piá (footballer, born 1973) =

Brazilian footballer and manager

Personal information
- Full name: Reginaldo Revelino Jandoso
- Date of birth: 28 November 1973 (age 52)
- Place of birth: Cornélio Procópio, Brazil
- Height: 1.83 m (6 ft 0 in)
- Position: Midfielder

Youth career
- 1990–1992: Inter de Limeira

Senior career*
Years	Team	Apps	(Gls)
1993–1996	Inter de Limeira		
1996–1998	Santos	10	(0)
1997	Coritiba		
1998	→ Bragantino (loan)	17	(2)
1999	Ponte Preta	19	(2)
2000	Santos	0	(0)
2000–2003	Ponte Preta	75	(6)
2004	Corinthians	5	(0)
2004	Portuguesa	11	(0)
2005	Corinthians Alagoano	0	(0)
2005	Santa Cruz	6	(0)
2005	Ponte Preta	6	(1)
2006	União São João	0	(0)
2006	São Raimundo	23	(2)
2007	PAOK	0	(0)
2007	União São João	0	(0)
2007	Ituano	14	(2)
2008	Comercial de R.Preto	0	(0)
2008	Rio Preto	0	(0)
2008	Sampaio Corrêa	0	(0)
2008–2009	União São João	0	(0)
2009	Gama	2	(0)
2009	CSA	2	(1)
2010	Independente de Limeira		
2011	Aparecidense	0	(0)

Managerial career
- 2017–: Independente de Limeira
- * Club domestic league appearances and goals

Reginaldo Revelino Jandoso known as Piá (born 28 November 1973) was a Brazilian football player and manager. He spent most of his career in São Paulo state and played over 100 matches in Campeonato Brasileiro Série A.

== Biography ==
Born in Cornélio Procópio, Paraná to Divino Jandoso and Benedita Fernandes Jandoso, Piá moved to Limeira, São Paulo state at young age. He started his career at Internacional of Limeira. He finished as the champion of 1996 Campeonato Paulista Série A2 (League of São Paulo State Second Division). It was reported that he scored 6 goals in 35 appearances for Inter.

=== Brazilian Top Division ===
In mid-1996 he left for Santos, where he made his Campeonato Brasileiro Série A debut with team in 1996 season. After played for the team at 1997 Copa do Brasil and 1997 Campeonato Paulista, he left the club.

In 1998 season he played for Bragantino at 1998 Campeonato Brasileiro Série A. In 1999 season he switched to play for Ponte Preta. In 2000 season he returned to Santos and played at 2000 Campeonato Paulista and 2000 Copa do Brasil. He then returned to Ponte Preta and stayed with team for 3 1/2 seasons. He was injured in the first round of 2003 Campeonato Brasileiro Série A, missed a few months.

==== 2004 ====
In 2004 season he left for Corinthians, but only played 5 times in 2004 Campeonato Brasileiro Série A. In June he left the club for Portuguesa. He made his Série B debut for the club on 3 July 2004 (round 11), winning Santo André 3–0. Since then he was the absolute starter of the team, only missed the last round (round 23) and round 15 (30 July).

==== 2005 ====
In January 2005 he was signed by Corinthians of Alagoas state. At the mid of Campeonato Alagoano, he was loaned to Santa Cruz in April, for 2005 Campeonato Brasileiro Série B. He played his club debut on 8 May 2005, replacing Otacilio in 80th minute, winning Portuguesa 1–0. In September he was re-signed by Ponte Preta for 2005 Campeonato Brasileiro Série A.

=== Brazilian Second Division ===
==== 2006 ====
In January 2006 he left for União São João of 2006 Campeonato Paulista Série A2. In May he left for São Raimundo of Amazonas state, for 2006 Campeonato Brasileiro Série B. He made his club debut on 27 May 2006, winning Ituano 2–1.

==== 2007 ====
In February 2007, Piá returned to União São João, after a brief trail at PAOK. He was an unused bench for PAOK against Panathinaikos on 3 February 2007. With União São João, he finished as the fourth of Group B of the second phase (total of 8 teams divided into 2 groups) of 2007 Campeonato Paulista Série A2. He played 18 league matches and scored 7 goals (including 5 penalty) for the club, as team second scorer, 1 goal behind Thiago Tremonti. In August he left for Ituano of 2007 Campeonato Brasileiro Série B. The team finished as the bottom and relegated. He scored his debut goal on 4 September 2007 (round 23), winning Gama 2–0. He also invited to play at 2007 Copa Gazeta de Limeira, for amateur side Esporte Clube Santa Cruz (of Vila Queiroz, Limeira), which the team winning the cup of the city.

=== Late career ===
==== 2008 ====
In January 2008, he started the season in Campeonato Paulista Série A2 with Comercial of Ribeirão Preto (reg. number: 0833/08). He made his club debut on 23 January 2008, round 2 of the state league. He also played the next match. On 31 January 2008 he switched to Rio Preto, for Campeonato Paulista Série A1. He made his club debut on 2 February (round 6), losing to Marília 1–3. In total he played 7 matches in the state league first level.

In May he was signed by Sampaio Corrêa of Maranhão state, for 2008 Campeonato Maranhense and 2008 Campeonato Brasileiro Série C. He was released in July after failed to play any match in the national league.

In August he returned to União São João for 2008 Copa Paulista, which he scored 3 goals (2 of them were penalty) in 7 club appearances. He also played for Santa Cruz of Limeira, scored 2 goals in 2008 Copa Gazeta de Limeira. The team was eliminated in the semi-final.

==== 2009 ====
In January 2009 he extended his contract with União São João, for 2009 Campeonato Paulista Série A2. He scored 5 goals (included 1 penalty) in the state league (in 16+6 games), as team second topscorer, behind Andre Luiz. In July 2009 he left for Campeonato Brasileiro Série C side Gama, and made his club debut on 5 July 2009 (the fifth match), against Mixto, but left the club after the 7th game (out of 8 matches), as the team failed to qualify for the next stage. He was signed by CSA on 29 July 2009, for 2009 Campeonato Brasileiro Série D. He scored a debut goal on 1 August, winning Sergipe 2–0. The team 2–2 draw in the next round on 9 August, thus failed to qualify for the next stage. He also played the 2009 edition of Copa Gazeta de Limeira.

==== 2010 ====
In February 2010 he left returned to Comercial, after informally agreed a deal with Sport Club Barueri (ex-Campinas Futebol Clube) He played for the team at 2010 Campeonato Paulista Série A3, scored 2 goals. In June he left for Independente of Limeira, played at 2010 Campeonato Paulista Segunda Divisão, scored twice (included 1 penalty) in 6 games, including 2 derby against his former club Inter de Limeira. The team failed to advance to the next stage, finished as the 6th (out of 7 teams) in Group 3. The first stage consist of 46 teams and divided into 6 groups.

He played at 2010 Copa Gazeta for América of Iracemápolis.

==== 2011 ====
On 20 December 2010 he joined Aparecidense until the end of 2011 Campeonato Goiano. He then left for Seringueira Kahel and played in 2011 Copa Gazeta.

==== 2013 ====
He was a player for União São João in 2013 Campeonato Paulista Série A3.

=== Personal life ===
In 2001, he was found guilty of illegal possession of a weapon, which happened in 1997. He acquitted a murder case which happened in 1999, on 3 April 2008. He was arrested again in 2014 for alleged robbery on ATMs.

== Honours ==
- Campeonato Paulista Série A2: 1996
