= América Futebol Clube (SP) =

América-SP
- Full name: América Futebol Clube
- Nickname: Diabo (Devil)
- Founded: 28 January 1946; 80 years ago
- Ground: Teixeirão
- Capacity: 32,936
- League: Campeonato Paulista Segunda Divisão
- 2022: Paulistão 2ª Divisão, 29th of 36
Home colours	Away colours

América Futebol Clube (SP), also known as América de Rio Preto or simply América, is a Brazilian football team based in São José do Rio Preto, São Paulo. Founded in 1946, it plays in Campeonato Paulista Segunda Divisão.

It was named after America from Rio de Janeiro, even copying their team badge.

== History ==
On January 28, 1946, at Hotel São Paulo, Antônio Tavares Pereira Lima, an Estrada de Ferro Araraquarense (EFA, Araraquara city Railroad) engineer, Vitor Buongermino and 53 local sportsmen and columnists of two local newspapers (A Folha de Rio Preto and A Notícia) founded the club to rival the city's only team at the time, Bancários. The club was named América Futebol Clube. The other suggested names were Dínamo and Flamengo.

On March 17, 1946, América played its first match. América beat Ferroviária of Araraquara 3–1. América's first goal ever was scored by Quirino. América's starting eleven were Bob, Hugo and Edgar, De Lúcia, Quirino and Miguelzinho, Morgero, Dema, Pereira Lima, Fordinho and Birigui. Nelsinho substituted Pereira Lima during the match.

In 1957, the club won its first title, the Campeonato Paulista Second Level, finishing ahead of São Bento. The club was promoted to the following year's first level.

In 1978, América competed in the Campeonato Brasileiro Série A for the first time, finishing in 38th position.

In 1980, the club competed in the Campeonato Brasileiro Série A for the second time, finishing in the 32nd position.

In 2006, América won the Copa São Paulo de Juniores, beating Comercial of Ribeirão Preto in the final.

== Honours ==
=== Official tournaments ===
State
Competitions	Titles	Seasons
Campeonato Paulista Série A2	3	1957, 1963, 1999

=== Others tournaments ===
==== State ====
- Torneio José Maria Marin (1): 1987
- Torneio Incentivo (1): 1979
- Torneio da Fraternidade (1): 1957
- Torneio Início (1): 1958

=== Runners-up ===
- Campeonato Paulista Série A2 (2): 1962, 1998
- Campeonato Paulista Segunda Divisão: 2026

=== Youth team ===
- Copa São Paulo de Futebol Júnior (1): 2006

== Stadium ==
América's home stadium is Estádio Benedito Teixeira, usually known as Teixeirão, inaugurated in 1996, with a maximum capacity of 36,426 people.

The club also owns a training ground, named Centro de Treinamento Sami Gorayb, and nicknamed Toca do Rubro (meaning Red's Burrow).

== Club colors ==
América's official club colors are red and white. The club's home kit is composed of a red shirt, white short and red socks.

== Anthem ==
The club's official anthem lyrics was composed by Walter Benfatti and the music's author was Roberto Farath. There is another anthem, created to celebrate the club's 50th anniversary. This anthem lyrics was composed by José Celso Colturato Barbeiro and the music by Edson Crepaldi and Fernando Marques Alves .

== Mascot ==
América's mascot is a red devil, called Diabo.
