= 2003 Santos FC season =

Santos
2003 season
- President: Marcelo Teixeira
- Coach: Emerson Leão
- Stadium: Vila Belmiro
- Campeonato Brasileiro: 2nd
- Campeonato Paulista: 9th
- Copa Libertadores: Runners-up
- Copa Sudamericana: Quarter-finals
- Top goalscorer: League: Fabiano (10); All: Ricardo Oliveira (20)

The 2003 season was Santos Futebol Clube's ninety-first season in existence and the club's fifty consecutive season in the top flight of Brazilian football.

== Players ==
=== Squad information ===
Note: Flags indicate national team as defined under FIFA eligibility rules; some limited exceptions apply. Players may hold more than one non-FIFA nationality.

| No. | Pos. | Nation | Player |
|---|---|---|---|
| — | GK | BRA | Fábio Costa |
| — | GK | BRA | Júlio Sérgio |
| — | GK | BRA | Rafael |
| — | DF | BRA | Alex |
| — | DF | BRA | André Luís |
| — | DF | BRA | Pereira |
| — | DF | BRA | Léo |
| — | DF | BRA | Michel |
| — | DF | BRA | Nenêm |
| — | DF | BRA | Reginaldo Araújo |
| — | DF | BRA | Preto |
| — | DF | BRA | Rubens Cardoso |
| — | MF | BRA | Daniel Paulista |
| — | MF | BRA | Narciso |
| — | MF | BRA | Paulo Almeida |
| — | MF | BRA | Adiel |

| No. | Pos. | Nation | Player |
|---|---|---|---|
| — | MF | BRA | Wellington |
| — | MF | BRA | Alexandre |
| — | MF | BRA | Canindé |
| — | MF | BRA | Diego |
| — | MF | BRA | Elano |
| — | MF | BRA | Renato |
| — | MF | BRA | Nenê |
| — | MF | BRA | Robert |
| — | FW | BRA | Fabiano |
| — | FW | BRA | Robinho |
| — | FW | BRA | Douglas |
| — | FW | BRA | Marcelo Peabirú |
| — | FW | BRA | Ricardo Oliveira |
| — | FW | BRA | Val Baiano |
| — | FW | BRA | William |

=== Appearances and goals ===
| Pos. | Name | Brasileirão | | Libertadores | | Paulistão | | Sudamericana | | Total | |
| Pos. | Name | Apps | Goals | Apps | Goals | Apps | Goals | Apps | Goals | Apps | Goals |
|---|---|---|---|---|---|---|---|---|---|---|---|
| GK | (Brazil) Fábio Costa | 35 | 0 | 12 | 0 | 5 | 0 | 6 | 0 | 58 | 0 |
| GK | (Brazil) Júlio Sérgio | 11(1) | 0 | 2 | 0 | 1(1) | 0 | 0 | 0 | 16 | 0 |
| DF | (Brazil) Alex | 34 | 9 | 13 | 4 | 6 | 1 | 6 | 1 | 59 | 15 |
| DF | (Brazil) André Luis | 36 | 3 | 9(2) | 1 | 2 | 1 | 5 | 0 | 54 | 5 |
| DF | (Brazil) Preto | 8(8) | 1 | 2(1) | 0 | 4(1) | 0 | 1 | 0 | 25 | 1 |
| DF | (Brazil) Pereira | 14(1) | 1 | 4(1) | 0 | 1(1) | 0 | 0 | 0 | 22 | 1 |
| DF | (Brazil) Silvio | 0(1) | 0 | 0 | 0 | 0 | 0 | 0 | 0 | 1 | 0 |
| DF | (Brazil) Léo | 43 | 3 | 14 | 2 | 6 | 0 | 5(1) | 1 | 69 | 6 |
| DF | (Brazil) Reginaldo Araújo | 30(8) | 0 | 6 | 0 | 3 | 0 | 5(1) | 0 | 53 | 0 |
| DF | (Brazil) Rubens Cardoso | 2(10) | 0 | 0(3) | 0 | 0 | 0 | 1(1) | 0 | 17 | 0 |
| DF | (Brazil) Neném | 7 | 0 | 0 | 0 | 0 | 0 | 1 | 0 | 8 | 0 |
| DF | (Brazil) Michel | 1(1) | 0 | 3 | 0 | 1 | 0 | 0 | 0 | 6 | 0 |
| DF | (Brazil) Jaílson | 1 | 0 | 0 | 0 | 0 | 0 | 0 | 0 | 1 | 0 |
| MF | (Brazil) Renato | 44 | 9 | 13 | 1 | 6 | 0 | 5 | 0 | 68 | 10 |
| MF | (Brazil) Elano | 39 | 8 | 12 | 1 | 5 | 2 | 5 | 1 | 61 | 12 |
| MF | (Brazil) Diego | 33 | 9 | 14 | 4 | 6 | 1 | 4 | 0 | 57 | 14 |
| MF | (Brazil) Fabiano | 21(13) | 10 | 4(6) | 1 | 1(1) | 0 | 3(2) | 1 | 51 | 12 |
| MF | (Brazil) Paulo Almeida | 28 | 0 | 13 | 0 | 6 | 0 | 3 | 0 | 50 | 0 |
| MF | (Brazil) Alexandre | 9(11) | 0 | 2 | 0 | 0(3) | 0 | 2(2) | 0 | 29 | 0 |
| MF | (Brazil) Daniel Paulista | 12(11) | 1 | 0(2) | 0 | 0 | 0 | 2(1) | 0 | 28 | 1 |
| MF | (Brazil) Jerri | 11(12) | 5 | 0 | 0 | 0 | 0 | 1(2) | 0 | 26 | 5 |
| MF | (Brazil) Wellington | 4(8) | 0 | 3(1) | 0 | 0(1) | 0 | 0 | 0 | 17 | 0 |
| MF | (Brazil) Narciso | 1(1) | 0 | 0 | 0 | 0 | 0 | 0 | 0 | 2 | 0 |
| FW | (Brazil) Robinho | 32 | 9 | 14 | 4 | 6 | 0 | 6 | 2 | 58 | 15 |
| FW | (Brazil) Nenê | 18(4) | 8 | 2(10) | 3 | 0(3) | 0 | 0(1) | 0 | 38 | 11 |
| FW | (Brazil) Ricardo Oliveira | 14 | 4 | 11 | 9 | 6 | 7 | 0 | 0 | 31 | 20 |
| FW | (Brazil) William | 9(10) | 9 | 1(1) | 0 | 0(2) | 0 | 4 | 2 | 27 | 11 |
| FW | (Brazil) Douglas | 5(10) | 3 | 1(4) | 0 | 0(1) | 0 | 0 | 0 | 21 | 3 |
| FW | (Brazil) Marcelo Peabirú | 2(4) | 0 | 0 | 0 | 0 | 0 | 0(3) | 0 | 9 | 0 |
| FW | (Brazil) Val Baiano | 1(5) | 0 | 0 | 0 | 0 | 0 | 1(1) | 0 | 8 | 0 |
| FW | (Brazil) Júlio César | 1(5) | 0 | 0 | 0 | 0 | 0 | 0(1) | 0 | 7 | 0 |
| FW | (Brazil) Adiel | 0 | 0 | 0 | 0 | 1(1) | 0 | 0 | 0 | 2 | 0 |

Source: Match reports in Competitive matches

=== In ===
| P | Player | Moving from | Source |
|---|---|---|---|
| MF | (Brazil) Nenê | (Brazil) Paulista | |
| FW | (Brazil) Ricardo Oliveira | (Brazil) Portuguesa | |
| FW | (Brazil) Fabiano | (Brazil) Internacional | |
| DF | (Brazil) Reginaldo Araújo | (Brazil) Coritiba | |
| DF | (Brazil) Rubens Cardoso | (Brazil) Palmeiras | |
| MF | (Brazil) Daniel Paulista | (Brazil) Comercial | |
| FW | (Brazil) Júlio César | (Turkey) Gaziantepspor | |
| FW | (Brazil) Val Baiano | (Brazil) Paranavaí | |
| FW | (Brazil) Marcelo Peabirú | (Brazil) ADAP | |
| DF | (Brazil) Neném | (Brazil) Palmeiras | |

=== Out ===
| P | Player | Moving to | Source |
|---|---|---|---|
| DF | (Brazil) Maurinho | (Brazil) Cruzeiro | |
| DF | (Brazil) Bernardi | (Brazil) União São João | |
| DF | (Brazil) Leandro | (Brazil) Brasiliense | |
| DF | (Brazil) Michel | (Brazil) Goiás | |
| MF | (Brazil) Robert | (Japan) Consadole Sapporo | |
| FW | (Brazil) Fabiano Souza | (Brazil) Mogi Mirim | |
| MF | (Brazil) Canindé | (Brazil) Paulista | |
| FW | (Brazil) Bruno Moraes | (Portugal) Porto B | |
| FW | (Brazil) Alberto | (Russia) Dynamo Moscow | |
| DF | (Brazil) Marcão | (Brazil) Sport | |
| FW | (Brazil) Ricardo Oliveira | (Spain) Valencia | |
| FW | (Brazil) Fabiano | (Spain) Albacete | |
| MF | (Brazil) Nenê | (Spain) Mallorca | |
| FW | (Brazil) Marcelo Peabirú | Free agent | |

== Friendlies ==
| 19 January | Comercial–SP | 1–0 | Santos | Ribeirão Preto |
| | Palhinha 45' (pen.) | Report | | Stadium: Estádio Palma Travassos; Referee: Marcelo Rogério |

| 21 March | Uberaba | 2–5 | Santos | Uberaba |
| | Gilson Batata 23', 70' | Report | 19' Ricardo Oliveira; 24' Diego; 36' Renato; 57' Nenê; 90+2' Adiel | Stadium: Uberabão; Referee: Carlos Henrique Tosta |

| 9 September | Cuiabá | 1–2 | Santos | Cuiabá |
| | Robinho 79' | Report | 12' Marcelo Peabirú; 69' Robinho | Stadium: Estádio Governador José Fragelli |

| 18 November | Santos | 1–3 | Brazil U23 | Santos |
| | Jaílson 84' | Report | 20' (o.g.) Pereira; 57' Robinho; 86' Marcel | Stadium: Vila Belmiro; Referee: Cléber Wellington Abade |

== Competitions ==
=== Overall summary ===
| Competition | Started round | Final position / round | First match | Last match |
|---|---|---|---|---|
| Campeonato Brasileiro | — | 2nd | 30 March | 14 December |
| Campeonato Paulista | Group Stage | Group Stage | 25 January | 15 February |
| Copa Libertadores | Group Stage | Runners-up | 6 February | 2 July |
| Copa Sudamericana | Brazil 1 preliminary | Quarterfinals | 13 August | 29 October |

=== Detailed overall summary ===
| | Total | Home | Away |
|---|---|---|---|
| Games played | 72 | 36 | 36 |
| Games won | 37 | 21 | 16 |
| Games drawn | 21 | 11 | 10 |
| Games lost | 14 | 4 | 10 |
| Biggest win | 7–4 v Bahia | 5–1 v Inter de Limeira | 7–4 v Bahia |
| Biggest loss | 0–3 v Cruzeiro | 1–3 v Boca Juniors | 0–3 v Cruzeiro |
| Clean sheets | 16 | 7 | 9 |
| Goals scored | 143 | 79 | 64 |
| Goals conceded | 93 | 44 | 49 |
| Goal difference | +50 | +35 | +15 |
| Average GF per game | 1.98 | 2.19 | 1.77 |
| Average GC per game | 1.29 | 1.22 | 1.36 |
| Most appearances | Léo (69) | Léo and Renato (34) | Léo (35) |
| Top scorer | Ricardo Oliveira (20) | Ricardo Oliveira (13) | Robinho (10) |
| Points | 132/216 (61.11%) | 74/108 (68.51%) | 58/108 (53.7%) |
| Winning rate | 51.38% | 58.33% | 44.44% |

=== Campeonato Brasileiro ===
==== League table ====
| Pos | Team | Pld | W | D | L | GF | GA | GD | Pts | Qualification or relegation |
|---|---|---|---|---|---|---|---|---|---|---|
| 1 | Cruzeiro | 46 | 31 | 7 | 8 | 102 | 47 | +55 | 100 | Qualified for 2004 Copa Libertadores and 2004 Copa Sudamericana |
| 2 | Santos | 46 | 25 | 12 | 9 | 93 | 60 | +33 | 87 | Qualified for 2004 Copa Libertadores and 2004 Copa Sudamericana |
| 3 | São Paulo | 46 | 22 | 12 | 12 | 81 | 67 | +14 | 78 | Qualified for 2004 Copa Libertadores and 2004 Copa Sudamericana |
| 4 | São Caetano | 46 | 19 | 14 | 13 | 53 | 37 | +16 | 74 | Qualified for 2004 Copa Libertadores and 2004 Copa Sudamericana |
| 5 | Coritiba | 46 | 21 | 10 | 15 | 67 | 58 | +9 | 73 | Qualified for 2004 Copa Libertadores and 2004 Copa Sudamericana |

==== Results summary ====
| Overall | | | | | | | | Home | | | | | | Away | | | | | |
| Pld | W | D | L | GF | GA | GD | Pts | W | D | L | GF | GA | GD | W | D | L | GF | GA | GD |
|---|---|---|---|---|---|---|---|---|---|---|---|---|---|---|---|---|---|---|---|
| 46 | 25 | 12 | 9 | 93 | 60 | +33 | 87 | 15 | 6 | 2 | 55 | 29 | +26 | 10 | 6 | 7 | 38 | 31 | +7 |

Source: Competitive matches

==== Results by round ====
| Round | 1 | 2 | 3 | 4 | 5 | 6 | 7 | 8 | 9 | 10 | 11 | 12 | 13 | 14 | 15 | 16 | 17 | 18 | 19 | 20 | 21 | 22 | 23 | 24 | 25 | 26 | 27 | 28 | 29 | 30 | 31 | 32 | 33 | 34 | 35 | 36 | 37 | 38 | 39 | 40 | 41 | 42 | 43 | 44 | 45 | 46 |
|---|---|---|---|---|---|---|---|---|---|---|---|---|---|---|---|---|---|---|---|---|---|---|---|---|---|---|---|---|---|---|---|---|---|---|---|---|---|---|---|---|---|---|---|---|---|---|
| Ground | H | A | H | A | A | H | A | H | A | H | H | A | H | A | H | H | A | A | H | A | H | H | A | H | A | A | H | H | A | H | A | H | A | A | H | A | H | A | A | H | H | A | H | A | H | A |
| Result | D | D | W | L | W | W | W | L | D | W | W | W | L | W | W | W | D | L | W | W | D | W | L | D | W | L | W | W | D | W | L | D | L | W | D | D | W | W | W | W | W | W | W | L | D | D |
| Position | 10 | 18 | 10 | 14 | 6 | 4 | 3 | 3 | 4 | 3 | 3 | 2 | 2 | 2 | 2 | 1 | 1 | 3 | 3 | 3 | 2 | 2 | 2 | 2 | 2 | 2 | 2 | 1 | 2 | 2 | 2 | 2 | 2 | 2 | 2 | 2 | 2 | 2 | 2 | 2 | 2 | 2 | 2 | 2 | 2 | 2 |

A = Away; H = Home; W = Win; D = Draw; L = Loss

==== Matches ====
| 30 March 1 | Santos | 2–2 | Paraná Clube | Santos |
| | Robinho 35'; Nenê 75' | Report | 13' Renaldo; 29' Marquinhos | Stadium: Vila Belmiro; Referee: Marcos Antônio Café |

| 5 April 2 | Atlético Mineiro | 0–0 | Santos | Belo Horizonte |
| | | Report | | Stadium: Mineirão; Referee: Wagner Tardelli Azevedo |

| 12 April 3 | Santos | 2–0 | Figueirense | Santos |
| | Elano 33'; Ricardo Oliveira 82' | Report | | Stadium: Vila Belmiro; Referee: Lourival Dias Lima Filho |

| 9 April 4 | Paysandu | 2–1 | Santos | Belém do Pará |
| | Vélber 47', 76' | Report | 38' Robinho | Stadium: Mangueirão; Referee: Luciano Augusto Almeida |

| 19 April 5 | Flamengo | 0–2 | Santos | Rio de Janeiro |
| | | Report | 18' Léo; 60' Elano | Stadium: Maracanã; Referee: Alício Pena Júnior |

| 27 April 6 | Santos | 4–0 | Fortaleza | Santos |
| | Renato 34', 86'; Nenê 51'; Douglas 80' | Report | | Stadium: Vila Belmiro; Referee: Leonardo Gaciba |

| 4 May 7 | Criciúma | 1–3 | Santos | Criciúma |
| | Paulo Baier 71' (pen.) | Report | 36', 90+3' (pen.) Nenê; 58' Robinho | Stadium: Estádio Heriberto Hulse |

| 10 May 8 | Santos | 0–2 | Cruzeiro | Santos |
| | | Report | 48' Aristizábal; 87' Mota | Stadium: Vila Belmiro; Referee: Wilson de Souza Mendonça |

| 17 May 9 | Juventude | 1–1 | Santos | Caxias do Sul |
| | João Paulo 20' | Report | 33' (o.g.) Gustavo | Stadium: Estádio Alfredo Jaconi |

| 25 May 10 | Santos | 2–1 | Internacional | Santos |
| | Fabiano 56'; William 78' | Report | 44' Edu Silva | Stadium: Vila Belmiro; Referee: Lourival Dias Lima Filho |

| 1 June 11 | Santos | 3–2 | São Paulo | Santos |
| | Diego 16' (pen.); Fabiano 59'; Renato 81' | Report | 34' (pen.) Luís Fabiano; 73' Rico | Stadium: Vila Belmiro; Referee: Sálvio Spinola |

| 7 June 12 | Guarani | 1–2 | Santos | Campinas |
| | Wágner 31' | Report | 75' Douglas; 77' Elano | Stadium: Estádio Brinco de Ouro; Referee: Cleber Wellington Abade |

| 15 June 13 | Santos | 0–1 | São Caetano | Santos |
| | | Report | 80' Marcinho | Stadium: Vila Belmiro; Referee: Luís Marcelo Cancian |

| 30 July 14 | Atlético Paranaense | 0–2 | Santos | Curitiba |
| | | Report | 52' Nenê; 58' Renato | Stadium: Arena da Baixada; Referee: Edílson Soares da Silva |

| 28 June 15 | Santos | 4–0 | Bahia | Santos |
| | Douglas 14' (pen.); William 16'; Jerri 45' (pen.); Fabiano 74' | Report | | Stadium: Vila Belmiro; Referee: Jorge Rabello |

| 6 July 16 | Santos | 3–1 | Coritiba | Santos |
| | Jerri 36'; Fabiano 59'; Preto 61' | Report | 81' Tcheco | Stadium: Vila Belmiro; Referee: Wilson de Souza Mendonça |

| 9 July 17 | Corinthians | 1–1 | Santos | São Paulo |
| | Leandro Amaral 90+1' | Report | 13' Nenê | Stadium: Estádio do Morumbi; Referee: Sálvio Spinola |

| 13 July 18 | Vitória | 2–0 | Santos | Salvador |
| | Dudu Cearense 80' (pen.); Gilmar 90+1' | Report | | Stadium: Barradão; Referee: Leonardo Gaciba |

| 16 July 19 | Santos | 2–1 | Ponte Preta | Santos |
| | Ricardo Oliveira 42'; André Luís 51' | Report | 36' Jean | Stadium: Vila Belmiro; Referee: Romildo Correia |

| 19 July 20 | Fluminense | 1–4 | Santos | Mesquita |
| | Romário 40' | Report | 36' Elano; 45' Nenê; 63' (pen.) Ricardo Oliveira; 90+2' Jerri | Stadium: Estádio Giulite Coutinho; Referee: Antônio Hora Filho |

| 23 July 21 | Santos | 3–3 | Goiás | Santos |
| | Jerri 28'; Nenê 36'; Ricardo Oliveira 60' | Report | 42' Fabão; 45+1' Araújo; 68' Dimba | Stadium: Vila Belmiro; Referee: Elvecio Zequetto |

| 26 July 22 | Santos | 2–1 | Vasco | Santos |
| | André Luís 55'; Daniel Paulista 65' | Report | 68' Marcelinho Carioca | Stadium: Vila Belmiro; Referee: Carlos Eugênio Simon |

| 2 August 23 | Grêmio | 2–0 | Santos | Porto Alegre |
| | George Lucas 3'; Jorge Mutt 37' | Report | | Stadium: Olímpico; Referee: Álvaro Azeredo Quelhas |

| 6 August 24 | Santos | 3–3 | Atlético Mineiro | Santos |
| | Elano 51', 59'; Renato 81' | Report | 13' Kim; 34' Guilherme; 84' Luiz Alberto | Stadium: Vila Belmiro; Referee: Luciano A.Teotonio Almeida |

| 9 August 25 | Paraná | 1–2 | Santos | Curitiba |
| | Renaldo 5' | Report | 3', 50' Alex | Stadium: Estádio Couto Pereira; Referee: Jorge Fernando Rabello |

| 16 August 26 | Figueirense | 1–0 | Santos | Florianópolis |
| | Triguinho 86' | Report | | Stadium: Estádio Orlando Scarpelli; Referee: Wagner Tardelli Azeredo |

| 20 August 27 | Santos | 2–0 | Paysandu | Santos |
| | Alex 61'; Diego 64' (pen.) | Report | | Stadium: Vila Belmiro; Referee: Antônio Hora Filho |

| 23 August 28 | Santos | 2–1 | Flamengo | Santos |
| | Elano 14'; Alex 23' | Report | 52' (pen.) Edílson | Stadium: Vila Belmiro; Referee: Leonardo Gaciba |

| 30 August 29 | Fortaleza | 0–0 | Santos | Fortaleza |
| | | Report | | Stadium: Castelão; Referee: Carlos Eugênio Simon |

| 13 September 30 | Santos | 5–2 | Criciúma | Santos |
| | William 1', 6', 17'; Renato 19', 23' | Report | 2', 34' Dejair | Stadium: Vila Belmiro; Referee: Wilson de Souza Mendonça |

| 20 September 31 | Cruzeiro | 3–0 | Santos | Belo Horizonte |
| | Aristizábal 14' (pen.), 73'; Felipe Melo 69' | Report | | Stadium: Mineirão; Referee: Héber Roberto Lopes |

| 24 September 32 | Santos | 1–1 | Juventude | Santos |
| | William 74' | Report | 9' Índio | Stadium: Vila Belmiro; Referee: Cléver Assunção Gonçalves |

| 27 September 33 | Internacional | 1–0 | Santos | Porto Alegre |
| | Diego 70' | Report | | Stadium: Beira Rio; Referee: Sérgio Cristiano Nascimento |

| 4 October 34 | São Paulo | 1–2 | Santos | São Paulo |
| | Luís Fabiano 66' | Report | 37', 51' William | Stadium: Estádio do Morumbi; Referee: Paulo Cesar de Oliveira |

| 8 October 35 | Santos | 1–1 | Guarani | Santos |
| | Alex 83' | Report | 39' Ruy | Stadium: Vila Belmiro; Referee: Cleber Wellington Abade |

| 11 October 36 | São Caetano | 2–2 | Santos | São Caetano do Sul |
| | Marcinho 66' (pen.), 84' | Report | 1' Robinho; 84' Renato | Stadium: Estádio Anacleto Campanella; Referee: Anselmo da Costa |

| 19 October 37 | Santos | 3–2 | Atlético Paranaense | Santos |
| | Alex 10'; Diego 40' (pen.); Fabiano 51' (pen.) | Report | 4' Fernandinho; 56' Luciano Santos | Stadium: Vila Belmiro; Referee: Giulliano Bozzano |

| 22 October 38 | Bahia | 4–7 | Santos | Salvador |
| | Didi 9', 22'; Cícero 37'; Preto Casagrande 52' | Report | 14', 29' Robinho; 15' Léo; 64', 66' Diego; 79' William; 90+2' (pen.) Fabiano | Stadium: Fonte Nova; Referee: Jorge Rabello |

| 25 October 39 | Coritiba | 0–4 | Santos | Curitiba |
| | | Report | 23', 52' Robinho; 36' Léo; 68' André Luís | Stadium: Estádio Couto Pereira; Referee: Leonardo Gaciba |

| 2 November 40 | Santos | 3–1 | Corinthians | Santos |
| | Robinho 40'; Pereira 60'; Fabiano 72' | Report | 30' Fabinho | Stadium: Vila Belmiro; Referee: Paulo César de Oliveira |

| 5 November 41 | Santos | 3–1 | Vitória | Santos |
| | Alex 63'; Jerri 66'; Fabiano 83' | Report | 60' Alecsandro | Stadium: Vila Belmiro; Referee: Sérgio Cristiano Nascimento |

| 9 November 42 | Ponte Preta | 3–4 | Santos | Campinas |
| | Rodrigo 10'; Jean 33'; Luizinho Vieira 74' | Report | 23' Elano; 45+1' (pen.), 61' Diego; 77' Renato | Stadium: Estádio Moisés Lucarelli; Referee: Cléber Wellington Abade |

| 23 November 43 | Santos | 3–1 | Fluminense | Santos |
| | Diego 51'; Alex 53'; Fabiano 57' | Report | 48' Esquerdinha | Stadium: Vila Belmiro; Referee: Jamir Carlos Garcez |

| 30 November 44 | Goiás | 3–0 | Santos | Goiânia |
| | Grafite 38'; Pereira 53' (o.g.); Dimba 85' (pen.) | Report | | Stadium: Estádio Serra Dourada; Referee: Carlos Eugênio Simon |

| 7 December 45 | Santos | 2–2 | Grêmio | Santos |
| | Alex 45+2'; Diego 72' | Report | 35' Christian; 64' Bruno | Stadium: Vila Belmiro; Referee: Alício Pena Júnior |

| 14 December 46 | Vasco | 1–1 | Santos | Rio de Janeiro |
| | Régis 53' | Report | 84' (pen.) Fabiano | Stadium: Estádio São Januário; Referee: Alicio Pena Júnior |

=== Copa Libertadores ===
==== Group stage ====
| Pos | Team | Pld | W | D | L | GF | GA | GD | Pts |
|---|---|---|---|---|---|---|---|---|---|
| 1 | (Brazil) Santos | 6 | 4 | 2 | 0 | 16 | 4 | +12 | 14 |
| 2 | (Colombia) América de Cali | 6 | 3 | 1 | 2 | 11 | 11 | 0 | 10 |
| 3 | (Ecuador) El Nacional | 6 | 1 | 3 | 2 | 4 | 6 | −2 | 6 |
| 4 | (Paraguay) 12 de Octubre | 6 | 1 | 0 | 5 | 7 | 17 | −10 | 3 |

| 6 February 1 | América de Cali (Colombia) | 1–5 | (Brazil) Santos | Cali, Colombia |
| | Banguero 35' | Report | 28' Léo; 36' Alex; 67', 88' Ricardo Oliveira; 69' Diego | Stadium: Estadio Olímpico Pascual Guerrero; Referee: (Venezuela) Luis Solórzano |

| 20 February 2 | Santos (Brazil) | 3–1 | (Paraguay) 12 de Octubre | Santos, Brazil |
| | Elano 17'; Ricardo Oliveira 64'; Nenê 71' | Report | 3' Bareiro | Stadium: Vila Belmiro; Referee: (Bolivia) René Ortubé |

| 12 March 3 | El Nacional (Ecuador) | 0–0 | (Brazil) Santos | Quito, Ecuador |
| | | Report | | Stadium: Estadio Olímpico Atahualpa; Referee: (Peru) Gilberto Hidalgo |

| 19 March 4 | Santos (Brazil) | 3–0 | (Colombia) America de Cali | Santos, Brazil |
| | Diego 3'; Robinho 24'; Ricardo Oliveira 77' | Report | | Stadium: Vila Belmiro; Referee: (Argentina) Daniel Giménez |

| 25 March 5 | 12 de Octubre (Paraguay) | 1–4 | (Brazil) Santos | Ciudad Del Este, Paraguay |
| | Monzón 83' | Report | 3' Robinho; 38' Diego; 78' Nenê; 87' Ricardo Oliveira | Stadium: Estadio Antonio Oddone Sarubbi; Referee: (Argentina) Sergio Pezzotta |

| 16 April 6 | Santos (Brazil) | 1–1 | (Ecuador) El Nacional | Santos, Brazil |
| | Ricardo Oliveira 18' | Report | 57' Chalá | Stadium: Vila Belmiro; Referee: (Argentina) Oscar Sequeira |

==== Knockout stage ====
===== Round of 16 =====
| 23 April First leg | Nacional (Uruguay) | 4–4 | (Brazil) Santos | Montevidéu, Uruguay |
| | Guerrero 57'; Peralta 71'; Scotti 81'; Benoît 90+5' | Report | 5' Alex; 44', 84' (pen.) Ricardo Oliveira; 65' Robinho | Stadium: Estadio Centenario; Referee: (Argentina) Horácio Elizondo |

| 7 May Second leg | Santos (Brazil) | 2–2 (6 – 6 agg.) (3 – 1 p) | (Uruguay) Nacional | Santos, Brazil |
| | Ricardo Oliveira 9'; Eguren 64' (o.g.) | Report | 38' Eguren; 41' O'Neill | Stadium: Vila Belmiro; Referee: (Argentina) Héctor Baldassi |
| | Penalties |
| | Ricardo Oliveira (penalty scored); Elano (penalty scored); Renato (penalty scored) | | (penalty missed) Peralta; (penalty missed) Morales; (penalty scored) Múnua; (penalty missed) Juárez |

===== Quarter-finals =====
| 21 May First leg | Cruz Azul (Mexico) | 2–2 | (Brazil) Santos | Mexico City, Mexico |
| | Palencia 18', 61' | Report | 22' Renato; 77' Diego | Stadium: Estadio Azteca; Referee: (Colombia) Oscar Ruiz |

| 28 May Second leg | Santos (Brazil) | 1–0 (3 – 2 agg.) | (Mexico) Cruz Azul | Santos, Brazil |
| | Robinho 13' | Report | | Stadium: Vila Belmiro; Referee: (Paraguay) Epifanio González |

===== Semi-finals =====
| 4 June First leg | Santos (Brazil) | 1–0 | (Colombia) Independiente | Santos, Brazil |
| | Nenê 68' | Report | | Stadium: Vila Belmiro; Referee: (Paraguay) Carlos Amarilla |

| 18 June Second leg | Independiente (Colombia) | 2–3 (2 – 4 agg.) | (Brazil) Santos | Medellín, Colombia |
| | Moreno 14'; Molina 81' | Report | 37' Alex; 62' Fabiano; 87' Léo | Stadium: Estadio Atanasio Girardot; Referee: (Peru) Gilberto Hidalgo |

===== Finals =====
| 25 June First leg | Boca Juniors (Argentina) | 2–0 | (Brazil) Santos | Buenos Aires, Argentina |
| | Delgado 33', 84' | Report | | Stadium: La Bombonera; Referee: (Colombia) Oscar Ruiz |

| 2 July Second leg | Santos (Brazil) | 1–3 (1 – 5 agg.) | (Argentina) Boca Juniors | São Paulo, Brazil |
| | Alex 75' | Report | 21' Tevez; 84' Delgado; 90+4' Schiavi | Stadium: Estadio do Morumbi; Referee: (Uruguay) Jorge Larrionda |

=== Campeonato Paulista ===
==== Results summary ====
| Overall | | | | | | | | Home | | | | | | Away | | | | | |
| Pld | W | D | L | GF | GA | GD | Pts | W | D | L | GF | GA | GD | W | D | L | GF | GA | GD |
|---|---|---|---|---|---|---|---|---|---|---|---|---|---|---|---|---|---|---|---|
| 6 | 3 | 1 | 2 | 12 | 9 | +3 | 10 | 2 | 0 | 1 | 9 | 5 | +4 | 1 | 1 | 1 | 3 | 4 | −1 |

==== Group stage ====
| Pos | Team | Pld | W | D | L | GF | GA | GD | Pts | Qualification |
|---|---|---|---|---|---|---|---|---|---|---|
| 1 | Portuguesa Santista (Q) | 6 | 5 | 1 | 0 | 15 | 2 | +13 | 16 | Qualifies to the Semifinals |
| 2 | São Paulo (Q) | 6 | 3 | 2 | 1 | 15 | 6 | +9 | 11 | Qualifies to the Semifinals |
| 3 | Santo André (Q) | 6 | 3 | 2 | 1 | 9 | 6 | +3 | 11 | Qualifies to the Semifinals |
| 4 | Santos | 6 | 3 | 1 | 2 | 12 | 9 | +3 | 10 | |
| 5 | Paulista | 6 | 2 | 1 | 3 | 9 | 12 | −3 | 7 | |
| 6 | Internacional de Limeira | 6 | 1 | 1 | 4 | 7 | 21 | −14 | 4 | |
| 7 | Juventus | 6 | 0 | 0 | 6 | 5 | 16 | −11 | 0 | |

Rules for classification: 1) points; 2) goal difference; 3) number of goals scored.
(Q) Qualified for the phase indicated

| 25 January 1 | Santo André | 2–2 | Santos | Santo André |
| | Edvaldo 4'; Nunes 73' | Report | 8' (pen.) Ricardo Oliveira; 53' Elano | Stadium: Estádio Bruno José Daniel; Referee: Tadeu Bosco da Cruz |

| 30 January 2 | Santos | 3–2 | Paulista | Santos |
| | Ricardo Oliveira 18', 51'; Alex 70' | Report | 72' Ânderson; 89' (pen.) Vágner Mancini | Stadium: Vila Belmiro; Referee: Anselmo da Costa |

| 2 February 3 | Juventus | 0–1 | Santos | São Paulo |
| | | Report | 20' Elano | Stadium: Estádio do Pacaembu; Referee: Edílson Pereira de Carvalho |

| 9 February 4 | Santos | 5–1 | Inter de Limeira | Santos |
| | André Luís 10'; Diego 32'; Ricardo Oliveira 36' (pen.), 53' (pen.), 67' | Report | 39' Mantena | Stadium: Vila Belmiro; Referee: Rodrigo Martins Cintra |

| 12 February 5 | Portuguesa Santista | 2–0 | Santos | Santos |
| | Rico 21', 39' | Report | | Stadium: Estádio Ulrico Mursa; Referee: Romildo Correia |

| 15 February 6 | Santos | 1–2 | São Paulo | Santos |
| | Ricardo Oliveira 41' | Report | 29' Gustavo Nery; 82' Luís Fabiano | Stadium: Vila Belmiro; Referee: Paulo César de Oliveira |

=== Copa Sul-Americana ===
==== Brazil 1 Preliminary ====
| Pos | Team | Pld | W | D | L | GF | GA | GD | Pts |
|---|---|---|---|---|---|---|---|---|---|
| 1 | (Brazil) Santos | 2 | 1 | 1 | 0 | 4 | 1 | +3 | 4 |
| 2 | (Brazil) Internacional | 2 | 1 | 1 | 0 | 4 | 2 | +2 | 4 |
| 3 | (Brazil) Flamengo | 2 | 0 | 0 | 2 | 1 | 6 | −5 | 0 |

| 13 August 1 | Santos (Brazil) | 1–1 | (Brazil) Internacional | Santos, Brazil |
| | Fabiano 78' | Report | 26' Flávio | Stadium: Vila Belmiro; Referee: (Brazil) Wilson de Souza Mendonça |

| 2 September 2 | Flamengo (Brazil) | 0–3 | (Brazil) Santos | Rio de Janeiro, Brazil |
| | | Report | 33', 55' William; 87' Léo | Stadium: Maracanã; Referee: (Brazil) Héber Roberto Lopes |

==== Final Brazil preliminary ====
| 17 September 1st leg | São Caetano (Brazil) | 0–1 | (Brazil) Santos | São Caetano do Sul, Brazil |
| | | Report | 50' (pen.) Robinho | Stadium: Estádio Anacleto Campanella; Referee: (Brazil) Paulo César de Oliveira |

| 1 October 2nd leg | Santos (Brazil) | 1–1 | (Brazil) São Caetano | Santos, Brazil |
| | Alex 34' | Report | 50' Adhemar | Stadium: Vila Belmiro; Referee: (Brazil) Silvia Regina Oliveira de Carvalho |

==== Quarter-finals ====
| 16 October 1st leg | Santos (Brazil) | 1–1 | (Peru) Cienciano | Santos, Brazil |
| | Robinho 78' | Report | 71' (o.g.) Alex | Stadium: Vila Belmiro; Referee: (Uruguay) Martín Vázquez |

| 29 October 2nd leg | Cienciano (Peru) | 2–1 | (Brazil) Santos | Cusco, Peru |
| | Carty 11', 35' | Report | 13' Elano | Stadium: Estadio Garcilaso; Referee: (Bolivia) René Ortubé |
