= 2002 Santos FC season =

Santos
2002 season
- President: Marcelo Teixeira
- Coach: Celso Roth (until May); Emerson Leão
- Stadium: Vila Belmiro
- Campeonato Brasileiro: Winners
- Torneio Rio-São Paulo: 9th
- Copa do Brasil: Second stage
- Top goalscorer: League: Alberto (12); All: Diego (13)

The 2002 season was Santos Futebol Clube's ninetieth season in existence and the club's forty-third consecutive season in the top flight of Brazilian football.

This season marked the new Meninos da Vila generation, where Robinho, Diego, Elano, Léo, Alex, Renato and others, helped Santos win their 6th Campeonato Brasileiro title, in which the club had not won since 1968.

== Players ==
=== Squad ===
Note: Flags indicate national team as defined under FIFA eligibility rules; some limited exceptions apply. Players may hold more than one non-FIFA nationality.

No.	Pos.	Nation	Player
—	GK	BRA	Fábio Costa
—	DF	BRA	André Luís
—	DF	BRA	Léo
—	DF	BRA	Maurinho
—	MF	BRA	Paulo Almeida
—	DF	BRA	Alex
—	FW	BRA	Robinho
—	MF	BRA	Renato
—	FW	BRA	Alberto
—	MF	BRA	Diego
—	MF	BRA	Elano
—	GK	BRA	Júlio Sérgio
—	DF	BRA	Michel

No.	Pos.	Nation	Player
—	DF	BRA	Pereira
—	DF	BRA	Preto
—	MF	BRA	Alexandre
—	MF	BRA	Wellington
—	MF	BRA	Robert
—	FW	BRA	William
—	FW	BRA	Douglas
—	FW	BRA	Adiel
—	FW	BRA	Fabiano Souza
—	DF	BRA	Marcão
—	GK	BRA	Rafael
—	DF	BRA	Bernardi

Source: Acervo Santista

=== Appearances and goals ===
Pos.	Name	Campeonato Brasileiro		Copa do Brasil		Torneio Rio-São Paulo		Total	
Pos.	Name	Apps	Goals	Apps	Goals	Apps	Goals	Apps	Goals
GK	(Brazil) Fábio Costa	6	0	4	0	15	0	25	0
GK	(Brazil) Júlio Sérgio	22	0	0	0	0	0	22	0
GK	(Brazil) Rafael	3+(1)	0	0	0	0	0	4	0
DF	(Brazil) Alex	25	3	0	0	0	0	25	3
DF	(Brazil) André Luís	18	1	0	0	6	1	24	2
DF	(Brazil) Léo	29	6	3	0	14	0	47	6
DF	(Brazil) Marcão	0+(1)	0	0	0	0	0	1	0
DF	(Brazil) Maurinho	26	0	0	0	0	0	26	0
DF	(Brazil) Michel	3+(1)	0	4	0	11+(1)	1	20	1
DF	(Brazil) Pereira	2+(5)	0	0	0	0	0	7	0
DF	(Brazil) Preto	20+(1)	0	3+(1)	0	11+(2)	1	38	1
DF	(Brazil) Bernardi	1+(3)	0	0	0	0	0	4	0
DF	(Brazil) Leandro	0	0	0	0	1	0	1	0
MF	(Brazil) Alexandre	2+(11)	0	0	0	0	0	13	0
MF	(Brazil) Canindé	1	0	0	0	0	0	1	0
MF	(Brazil) Diego	28	10	0+(3)	1	7+(4)	2	42	13
MF	(Brazil) Elano	29	9	1+(1)	0	4+(2)	0	37	9
MF	(Brazil) Paulo Almeida	28	0	4	0	9+(1)	0	42	0
MF	(Brazil) Renato	31	2	1	0	7+(2)	0	41	2
MF	(Brazil) Robert	3+(13)	2	3	0	14	8	33	10
MF	(Brazil) Wellington	2+(10)	0	0+(2)	0	2+(5)	0	21	0
FW	(Brazil) Adiel	0+(3)	0	0	0	0	0	3	0
FW	(Brazil) Alberto	28+(1)	12	0	0	0	0	29	12
FW	(Brazil) Douglas	1+(7)	1	1+(2)	0	4+(6)	1	21	2
FW	(Brazil) Fabiano Souza	1+(1)	0	0	0	0	0	2	0
FW	(Brazil) Robinho	30	10	0	0	0+(3)	0	33	10
FW	(Brazil) William	2+(16)	3	3+(1)	2	5+(8)	4	35	9
FW	(Brazil) Bruno Moraes	0+(2)	0	0	0	0	0	2	0
Players who left the club during the season
MF	(Brazil) Esquerdinha	0	0	1+(1)	0	6+(7)	0	15	0
MF	(Brazil) Marcelo Silva	0	0	4	0	15	2	19	2
FW	(Brazil) Oséas	0	0	4	2	7	1	11	3
MF	(Brazil) Eduardo Marques	0	0	0	0	1	0	1	0
DF	(Brazil) Valdir	0	0	0	0	4	0	4	0
DF	(Brazil) Cléber	0	0	3	0	9	3	12	3
DF	(Brazil) Odvan	0	0	4	2	12	1	16	3

== Transfers ==
=== In ===
Pos.	Name	Moving from	Source	Notes
DF	(Brazil) Michel	Vitória		Loan return
DF	(Brazil) André Luís	Fluminense		Loan return
MF	(Brazil) Wellington	Brasiliense		Loan return
MF	(Brazil) Eduardo Marques	Guarani		Loan return
FW	(Brazil) Adiel	Botafogo–SP		Loan return
DF	(Brazil) Odvan	Vasco		
FW	(Brazil) Oséas	Cruzeiro		
MF	(Brazil) Esquerdinha	São Caetano		
DF	(Brazil) Maurinho	Etti-Jundiaí		
GK	(Brazil) Júlio Sérgio	Comercial		
DF	(Brazil) Bernardi	Internacional		
MF	(Brazil) Alexandre	Guarani		
FW	(Brazil) Alberto	Rio Branco		
FW	(Brazil) Fabiano Souza	Internacional		

=== Out ===
Pos.	Name	Moving to	Source	Notes
GK	(Brazil) Pitarelli	Gama		
DF	(Brazil) Pereira	(Turkey) Gaziantepspor		On loan
DF	(Argentina) Galván	(Argentina) Lanús		
DF	(Brazil) Russo	São Caetano		
DF	(Brazil) Orestes	Portuguesa Santista		Loan return
DF	(Brazil) Rodrigo Costa	(Germany) 1860 München		
DF	(Brazil) Válber	Free agent		End of contract
MF	(Brazil) Vágner	Bahia		Loan return
FW	(Brazil) Marcelinho Carioca	(Japan) Gamba Osaka		
FW	(Brazil) Weldon	Brasiliense		
FW	(Brazil) Viola	Free agent		
FW	(Brazil) Oséas	Free agent		Contract terminated
FW	(Brazil) André Dias	Portuguesa Santista		On loan
DF	(Brazil) Cléber	(Switzerland) Yverdon		
DF	(Brazil) Odvan	Free agent		Contract terminated
DF	(Brazil) Valdir	Gama		On loan
MF	(Brazil) Marcelo Silva	(Russia) Spartak Moscow		
MF	(Brazil) Eduardo Marques	(Portugal) Belenenses		
MF	(Brazil) Esquerdinha	São Caetano		Loan return

== Friendlies ==
23 June	Roma-PR	0–1	Santos	Apucarana
		Report	56' William	Stadium: Bom Jesus da Lapa; Referee: Nilo Neves de Souza Júnior

13 July	Comercial	0–5	Santos	Ribeirão Preto
		Report	9' André Luís; 38' Diego; 40' Elano; 70' Júlio César; 90' Robinho	Stadium: Palma Travassos; Referee: Tadeu Bosco Silva

20 July	Rangers	0–1	Santos	East Rutherford
		Report	41' Diego	Stadium: Giants Stadium; Referee: Alex Prus

27 July	Santos	3–1	Corinthians	Santos
	André Luís 32'; William 82'; Renato 90'	Report	55' Gilmar Parrudo	Stadium: Vila Belmiro; Referee: Rodrigo Braghetto

== Competitions ==
=== Overall summary ===
Competition	Started round	Final position / round	First match	Last match
Campeonato Brasileiro	First stage	Winners	10 August	15 December
Torneio Rio-São Paulo	First stage	9th	20 January	14 April
Copa do Brasil	First round	Second round	6 February	6 March

=== Detailed overall summary ===
	Total	Home	Away
Games played	50	25	25
Games won	23	17	6
Games drawn	13	5	8
Games lost	14	3	11
Biggest win	4–1 v Cruzeiro	4–2 v Ji-Paraná	4–1 v Cruzeiro
Biggest loss	2–4 v Coritiba	1–3 v Ponte Preta	2–4 v Coritiba
Clean sheets	13	10	3
Goals scored	91	56	35
Goals conceded	67	27	40
Goal difference	+24	+29	-5
Average GF per game	1.82	2.24	1.4
Average GC per game	1.34	1.08	1.6
Most appearances	Léo (47)	Léo (23)	Léo (24)
Top scorer	Diego (13)	Alberto (9)	Elano (7)
Points	82/150 (54.67%)	56/75 (74.67%)	26/75 (34.66%)
Winning rate	46%	68%	24%

=== Campeonato Brasileiro ===
==== First stage ====
Pos	Team	Pld	W	D	L	GF	GA	GD	Pts	Qualification
6	Atlético Mineiro	25	12	4	9	49	43	+6	40	Qualified for quarter-finals
7	Fluminense	25	12	4	9	43	46	−3	40	Qualified for quarter-finals
8	Santos	25	11	6	8	46	36	+10	39	Qualified for quarter-finals
9	Cruzeiro	25	11	6	8	40	39	+1	39	
10	Vitória	25	11	4	10	46	42	+4	37	

Source: https://www.rsssfbrasil.com/tablesae/br2002.htm

===== Matches =====
10 August 1	Santos	2–1	Botafogo	Santos
	Elano 4'; Diego 43'	Report	85' Ademilson	Stadium: Vila Belmiro; Referee: Giuliano Bozzano

18 August 2	Juventude	2–1	Santos	Caxias do Sul
	Cláudio Pitbull 63'; Leonardo Manzi 73'	Report	82' William	Stadium: Alfredo Jaconi; Referee: Wagner Tardelli

21 August 3	Santos	3–0	Figueirense	Santos
	Léo 41'; Renato 47'; Douglas 86'	Report		Stadium: Vila Belmiro; Referee: Valdomiro Matias

25 August 4	Fluminense	1–1	Santos	Rio de Janeiro
	Rôni 90+3'	Report	55' Diego	Stadium: Maracanã; Referee: Carlos Eugênio Simon

28 August 5	Santos	2–1	Paraná	Santos
	Léo 63'; Diego 76' (pen.)	Report	46' Maurílio	Stadium: Vila Belmiro; Attendance: 7,661; Referee: Wilson de Souza Mendonça

31 August 6	Internacional	3–0	Santos	Porto Alegre
	Fernando Baiano 13' (pen.); Mahicon Librelato 60'; Carlos Miguel 90+1'	Report		Stadium: Beira-Rio; Referee: Heber Roberto Lopes

4 September 7	Santos	3–0	Vitória	Santos
	Alberto 8', 11'; Robinho 41'	Report		Stadium: Vila Belmiro; Attendance: 6,843; Referee: Sérgio Cristiano Nascimento

8 September 8	Santos	2–2	Atlético Paranaense	Santos
	William 53'; Alberto 70'	Report	7' (o.g.) Canindé; 69' (pen.) Kléberson	Stadium: Vila Belmiro; Referee: Alício Pena Júnior

11 September 9	Coritiba	4–2	Santos	Curitiba
	Lúcio Flávio 38' (pen.); Edinho Baiano 40'; Reginaldo Araújo 41'; Da Silva 65'	Report	24' (pen.), 30' Diego	Stadium: Beira-Rio; Referee: Leonardo Gaciba

14 September 10	Santos	2–0	Grêmio	Santos
	Alberto 33'; Léo 88'	Report		Stadium: Vila Belmiro; Referee: Giuliano Bozzano

18 September 11	Vasco	1–2	Santos	Rio de Janeiro
	Souza 17'	Report	5' Elano; 62' Alex	Stadium: São Januário; Referee: Wilson de Souza Mendonça

21 September 12	Santos	1–1	Goiás	Santos
	Elano 39'	Report	34' Araújo	Stadium: Vila Belmiro; Referee: Jorge Fernando Rabelo

26 September 13	Gama	0–0	Santos	Brasília
		Report		Stadium: Mané Garrincha; Referee: Álvaro Azeredo Quelhas

29 September 14	Santos	1–1	Palmeiras	Santos
	Robinho 21'	Report	87' Arce	Stadium: Vila Belmiro; Referee: Anselmo da Costa

3 October 15	Corinthians	2–4	Santos	São Paulo
	Fabinho 57'; Leandro 80'	Report	17', 31' Alberto; 48', 51' Elano	Stadium: Pacaembu; Referee: Edílson Pereira de Carvalho

9 October 16	Santos	3–2	Atlético Mineiro	Santos
	Alberto 27'; Alex 85'; Robinho 88'	Report	55' Souza; 90+2' Paulinho	Stadium: Vila Belmiro; Referee: Carlos Eugênio Simon

13 October 17	Cruzeiro	1–4	Santos	Belo Horizonte
	Joãozinho 87'	Report	4', 53' Elano; 18' André Luís; 62' Robinho	Stadium: Mineirão; Referee: Luciano Augusto Almeida

16 October 18	São Paulo	3–2	Santos	São Paulo
	Luís Fabiano 57' (pen.); Reinaldo 59'; Ricardinho 89' (pen.)	Report	71' Robert; 83' (pen.) Diego	Stadium: Morumbi; Referee: Cleber Wellington Abade

19 October 19	Santos	1–2	Portuguesa	Santos
	Diego 10'	Report	32' César; 68' Danilo	Stadium: Vila Belmiro; Referee: Paulo César de Oliveira

23 October 20	Paysandu	2–1	Santos	Belém
	Zé Augusto 11'; Vandick 87'	Report	13' Elano	Stadium: Mangueirão; Referee: Antonio Pereira da Silva

26 October 21	Santos	3–0	Flamengo	Santos
	William 25'; Robert 32'; Robinho 39'	Report		Stadium: Vila Belmiro; Referee: Wilson de Souza Mendonça

30 October 22	Bahia	1–1	Santos	Salvador
	Róbson 56' (pen.)	Report	90+1' Léo	Stadium: Fonte Nova; Referee: Wagner Tardelli

2 November 23	Guarani	0–2	Santos	Jundiaí
		Report	31' Diego; 43' Robinho	Stadium: Jayme Cintra; Referee: Romildo Correia

9 November 24	Santos	1–3	Ponte Preta	Santos
	Robinho 49' (pen.)	Report	15', 29' Basílio; 32' Caíco	Stadium: Vila Belmiro; Referee: Edílson Pereira de Carvalho

17 November 25	São Caetano	3–2	Santos	São Caetano do Sul
	Claudecir 40', 63'; Capixaba 53'	Report	58' Alex; 88' (pen.) Alberto	Stadium: Anacleto Campanella; Referee: Paulo César de Oliveira

==== Quarter-final ====
24 November 1st leg	Santos	3–1	São Paulo	Santos
	Alberto 30'; Robinho 51'; Diego 66'	Report	45+1' Kaká	Stadium: Vila Belmiro; Referee: Carlos Eugênio Simon

28 November 2nd leg	São Paulo	1–2 (2–5 agg.)	Santos	São Paulo
	Luís Fabiano 4'	Report	59' Léo; 90+2' Diego	Stadium: Morumbi; Attendance: 64,946; Referee: Wilson de Souza Mendonça

==== Semi-final ====
1 December 1st leg	Santos	3–0	Grêmio	Santos
	Alberto 37', 68'; Robinho 79'	Report		Stadium: Vila Belmiro; Referee: Heber Roberto Lopes

4 December 2nd leg	Grêmio	1–0 (1–3 agg.)	Santos	Porto Alegre
	Rodrigo Fabri 66'	Report		Stadium: Olímpico; Referee: Antônio Pereira da Silva

==== Final ====
8 December 1st leg	Santos	2–0	Corinthians	São Paulo
	Alberto 15'; Renato 88'	Report		Stadium: Morumbi; Referee: Antônio Pereira da Silva

15 December 2nd leg	Corinthians	2–3 (2–5 agg.)	Santos	São Paulo
	Deivid 75'; Anderson 84'	Report	37' (pen.) Robinho; 88' Elano; 90+2' Léo	Stadium: Morumbi; Referee: Carlos Eugênio Simon

=== Copa do Brasil ===
==== First round ====
6 February 1st leg	Ji-Paraná	0–0	Santos	Rolim de Moura
		Report		Stadium: José Ângelo Cassol; Referee: Marco Antonio Barros Café

13 February 2nd leg	Santos	4–2 (4–2 agg.)	Ji-Paraná	Santos
	William 21', 64'; Odvan 44'; Diego 73'	Report	69' Jardel; 90+1' Gelson	Stadium: Vila Belmiro; Referee: Jamir Carlos Garcez

==== Second round ====
27 February 1st leg	Santos	3–3	Internacional	Santos
	Odvan 2'; Oséas 10', 54'	Report	6', 32' (pen.) Fernando Baiano; 61' Fabiano	Stadium: Vila Belmiro; Referee: Alício Pena Júnior

6 March 2nd leg	Internacional	1–0 (4–3 agg.)	Santos	Porto Alegre
	Carlos Miguel 33'	Report		Stadium: Beira Rio; Referee: Heber Roberto Lopes

=== Torneio Rio-São Paulo ===
20 January 1	Santos	3–0	America-RJ	Santos, Brazil
	Cléber 85'; Robert 90+1'; William 90+5'	Report		Stadium: Vila Belmiro; Attendance: 4,592; Referee: Leonardo da Silva

26 January 2	Ponte Preta	3–1	Santos	Campinas, Brazil
	Washington 49', 58'; Adrianinho 79'	Report	3' Odvan	Stadium: Moisés Lucarelli; Referee: Paulo César de Oliveira

30 January 3	Santos	1–0	Corinthians	Santos, Brazil
	William 72'	Report		Stadium: Vila Belmiro; Referee: Edílson Pereira de Carvalho

2 February 4	Portuguesa	1–1	Santos	São Paulo, Brazil
	Evandro 77'	Report	66' Robert	Stadium: Canindé; Referee: Anselmo da Costa

9 February 5	Palmeiras	2–1	Santos	São Paulo, Brazil
	Alex 35'; Arce 62'	Report	51' William	Stadium: Parque Antártica; Referee: Cléber Wellington Abade

17 February 6	Santos	2–1	São Caetano	Santos, Brazil
	Cléber 2'; William 44' (pen.)	Report	39' Brandão	Stadium: Vila Belmiro; Attendance: 5,359; Referee: Paulo César de Oliveira

24 February 7	Santos	2–0	Flamengo	Santos, Brazil
	Oséas 17'; Marcelo Silva 57'	Report		Stadium: Vila Belmiro; Referee: Carlos Eugênio Simon

2 March 8	Americano	3–2	Santos	Campos dos Goytacazes, Brazil
	Washington 7', 21'; Rondinelli 89'	Report	10' Cléber; 27' Robert	Stadium: Godofredo Cruz; Referee: Wilson de Souza Mendonça

10 March 9	Santos	3–3	Botafogo	Santos, Brazil
	Robert 16', 59'; Diego 90+1'	Report	17', 77' Dodô; 51' Tailson	Stadium: Vila Belmiro; Referee: Luciano Augusto Almeida

16 March 10	Fluminense	1–1	Santos	Rio de Janeiro, Brazil
	Roger 17'	Report	56' André Luís	Stadium: Maracanã; Referee: Valdomiro da Silva Filho

20 March 11	Santos	1–2	Etti-Jundiaí	Santos, Brazil
	Diego 32'	Report	25' Jean Carlos; 77' Marcinho	Stadium: Vila Belmiro; Referee: Edílson Pereira de Carvalho

24 March 12	Santos	2–0	Guarani	Santos, Brazil
	Robert 18', 77'	Report		Stadium: Vila Belmiro; Attendance: 1,099; Referee: Anselmo da Costa

30 March 13	Vasco	1–1	Santos	Rio de Janeiro, Brazil
	Romário 90'	Report	5' Douglas	Stadium: São Januário; Referee: Leonardo Gaciba

7 April 14	Santos	3–2	São Paulo	Santos, Brazil
	Marcelo Silva 6'; Michel 37'; Preto 90+1'	Report	57' Reginaldo; 71' França	Stadium: Vila Belmiro; Referee: Romildo Correa

14 April 15	Bangu	1–1	Santos	Rio de Janeiro, Brazil
	Renatinho 12'	Report	23' Robert	Stadium: Moça Bonita; Referee: Heber Roberto Lopes
