= Léo (footballer, born 1975) =

Brazilian footballer

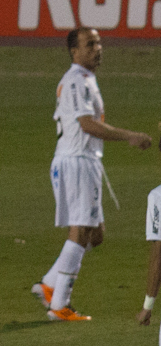
- Léo playing for Santos in the second leg of the 2011 Copa Libertadores finals

Personal information
- Full name: Leonardo Lourenço Bastos
- Date of birth: 6 July 1975 (age 51)
- Place of birth: Campos dos Goytacazes, Brazil
- Height: 1.69 m (5 ft 7 in)
- Position: Left-back

Youth career
- Americano

Senior career*
Years	Team	Apps	(Gls)
1995–1996	Americano	32	(3)
1997–2000	União São João	88	(3)
1999	→ Palmeiras (loan)	0	(0)
2000–2005	Santos	198	(15)
2005–2009	Benfica	82	(1)
2009–2014	Santos	144	(5)
Total		545	(27)

International career
2001–2005	Brazil	7	(0)
- * Club domestic league appearances and goals

Leonardo Lourenço Bastos (born 6 July 1975), commonly known as Léo, is a Brazilian retired professional footballer who played as a left-back.

He spent most of his professional career with Santos and Benfica, arriving at the latter at the age of 25 and winning eight major titles, winning the same amount with the former during his two spells.

Léo represented Brazil in two Confederations Cups.

== Club career ==
=== Early career ===
Léo was born in Campos dos Goytacazes, Rio de Janeiro. Local-based Americano Futebol Clube gave him his professional debut in 1995, and in 1997 he moved to São Paulo with União São João Esporte Clube. Two seasons later he was bought by Sociedade Esportiva Palmeiras but, within six months, he was shown the door by coach Luiz Felipe Scolari.

Subsequently, Léo joined Santos FC for R$1.6 million fee, quickly becoming an integral part of the team: in 2002, playing alongside the likes of Diego, Elano, Renato and Robinho, he won his first Série A championship, losing the following year's Copa Libertadores.

=== Benfica ===
After having appeared in 201 official games for Santos, aged 30, Léo signed for S.L. Benfica from Portugal for an undisclosed fee, on a three-year contract. He made his Primeira Liga debut on 18 September 2005 in a 4–0 home win against U.D. Leiria, and played in an average of 27 league matches in his first three seasons, but the club came out empty on major silverware.

In the 2005–06 campaign, Léo appeared 36 in official games (all starts) as the team reached the quarter-finals of the UEFA Champions League.

=== Return to Santos ===
In 2008–09, Léo began suffering stiff competition for the left-back position from compatriot David Luiz. On 14 January 2009 he left Benfica and returned to Santos, continuing to display solid performances in spite of his age.

Léo was an important defensive unit during 2011 Campeonato Paulista, being also elected the best left-back of the tournament. He also featured in all 12 matches for the club in Libertadores winning campaign, as well appearing in the 2011 FIFA Club World Cup Final loss to FC Barcelona.

Léo featured only in four games during the 2012 Campeonato Paulista which was won by Santos, mostly due to the club's participation in the Libertadores – he also appeared 17 times in the national league. In September, he suffered a knee injury.

After acting as a starter during the 2013 Paulista, Léo lost his left-back starting position to newly signed Eugenio Mena, and changed his position to midfielder in August 2013. On 3 October he scored the last goal in a 3–0 home win over São Paulo FC, after coming on as a substitute for Thiago Ribeiro; however, later in the same month he again injured his knee, being sidelined for the remainder of the season.

Léo returned to action on 3 April 2014, playing 16 minutes in a 0–0 draw at Mixto Esporte Clube for that year's Copa do Brasil. On the 24th, he was told that his contract (which was due to expire in six days) would not be renewed, and he later announced his retirement via Facebook, stating that "even though I feel I can still play, I can not see myself wearing another club's shirt"; additionally, he also sent a "special thanks to the great nation of Santos's supporters", saying: "It was for them I fought for every ball, celebrated every win and each one of the greatest titles".

Léo played 455 games for Santos all competitions comprised, entering the club's history books as the player with more titles won after the Pelé era and also ranking tenth in the list of total appearances.

== International career ==
Léo earned his first cap for Brazil on 31 May 2001, in the first game of the 2001 FIFA Confederations Cup, against Cameroon (2–0 win). He made five appearances during the tournament, with the national team finishing in fourth position.

Léo was also selected for the 2005 Confederations Cup, in Germany. As Gilberto's backup, he only featured against Japan (2–2 group stage draw) as the Seleção went on to win the competition.

== Controversies ==
Léo's career was often surrounded by controversy. In late 2010, after São Paulo failed to qualify to the 2011 Copa Libertadores, he said its supporters should be content "to watch" the competition on television.

The following year, when Santos won the continental tournament, he doubted of the capacity of its opponent in that year's FIFA Club World Cup, Barcelona, who went on to win it 4–0, however. In 2012, when Corinthians won the Libertadores and qualified to the following Club World Cup, he displayed irony while describing the trouble caused by the club's fans at the São Paulo–Guarulhos International Airport, saying "he who is accustomed to train stations, should not go to airports".

In March 2013, Léo regretted having made the comments about Corinthians, stating: "I am already 37 years old. I'll be quiet from now on. I won't speak what I'm thinking anymore (laughs). [...] Controversies are over".

== Career statistics ==
=== Club ===
Appearances and goals by club, season and competition
Club	Season	League			State league (Note: Including Campeonato Carioca, Campeonato Paulista.)		National cup (Note: Including Copa do Brasil, Taça de Portugal.)		League cup (Note: Including Taça da Liga.)		Continental		Other		Total	
Club	Season	Division	Apps	Goals	Apps	Goals	Apps	Goals	Apps	Goals	Apps	Goals	Apps	Goals	Apps	Goals
Americano	1995	Série B	3	0	4	0	—		—		—		—		7	0
Americano	1996	Série B	9	3	16	0	—		—		—		—		25	3
Americano	Total		12	3	20	0	—		—		—		—		32	3
União São João	1997	Série A	21	0	8	1	—		—		—		—		29	1
União São João	1998	Série A	13	1	7	0	—		—		—		—		20	1
União São João	1999	Série A	20	0	—		—		—		—		—		20	0
União São João	2000	Série A	1	0	19	1	—		—		—		—		20	1
União São João	Total		55	1	34	2	—		—		—		—		88	3
Santos	2000	Série A	16	0	—		—		—		—		—		16	0
Santos	2001	Série A	17	0	14	1	4	0	—		—		6 (Note: Appearance(s) in Torneio Rio–São Paulo)	1	41	2
Santos	2002	Série A	29	6	—		4	0	—		—		14	1	47	6
Santos	2003	Série A	43	3	6	0	—		—		20 (Note: Fourteen appearances and two goals in Copa Libertadores, six appearances and one goal in Copa Sudamericana)	3	—		69	6
Santos	2004	Série A	44	2	13	2	—		—		12 (Note: Nine appearances in Copa Libertadores, three appearances in Copa Sudamericana)	0	—		69	4
Santos	2005	Série A	6	0	10	1	—		—		8 (Note: Appearance(s) in Copa Libertadores)	1	—		24	2
Santos	Total		155	11	43	4	8	0	—		40	4	20	2	266	21
Benfica	2005–06	Primeira Liga	26	0	—		3	0	—		9 (Note: Appearance(s) in UEFA Champions League)	0	—		38	0
Benfica	2006–07	Primeira Liga	27	1	—		3	0	—		12 (Note: Six appearances and one goal in UEFA Champions League, six appearances in UEFA Cup)	1	—		42	2
Benfica	2007–08	Primeira Liga	27	0	—		3	0	0	0	12 (Note: Eight appearances in UEFA Champions League, four appearances in UEFA Cup)	0	—		42	0
Benfica	2008–09	Primeira Liga	2	0	—		2	0	0	0	1 (Note: Appearance(s) in UEFA Cup)	0	—		5	0
Benfica	Total		82	1	—		11	0	0	0	34	1	—		127	2
Santos	2009	Série A	24	1	6	0	—		—		—		—		30	1
Santos	2010	Série A	18	0	12	0	5	0	—		2 (Note: Appearance(s) in Copa Sudamericana)	0	—		37	1
Santos	2011	Série A	22	1	15	1	—		—		12	0	1 (Note: Appearance(s) in FIFA Club World Cup)	0	50	2
Santos	2012	Série A	17	0	4	0	—		—		2	0	1 (Note: Appearance(s) in Recopa Sudamericana)	0	24	0
Santos	2013	Série A	14	1	12	0	4	0	—		—		—		30	1
Santos	2014	Série A	0	0	—		1	0	—		—		—		1	0
Santos	Total		95	3	49	2	10	0	—		16	0	2	0	172	5
Career total			399	19	146	8	29	0	0	0	90	5	22	2	686	34

=== International ===
Appearances and goals by national team and year
National team	Year	Apps	Goals
Brazil	2001	5	0
Brazil	2005	2	0
Total		7	0

== Honours ==
Santos

- Campeonato Brasileiro Série A: 2002, 2004
- Campeonato Paulista: 2010, 2011, 2012
- Copa do Brasil: 2010
- Copa Libertadores: 2011
- Recopa Sudamericana: 2012

Brazil

- FIFA Confederations Cup: 2005

Individual

- Bola de Prata: 2001, 2003, 2004
- Campeonato Paulista best left-back: 2011
