= 2002 Campeonato Brasileiro Série A =

Campeonato Brasileiro Série A
- Season: 2002
- Champions: Santos (7th title)
- Relegated: Portuguesa; Palmeiras; Gama; Botafogo
- Copa Libertadores: Santos; Corinthians (via Copa do Brasil; Paysandu (via Copa dos Campeões); Grêmio
- Copa Sudamericana: Santos; Corinthians; Grêmio; Fluminense; São Paulo; São Caetano; Atlético Mineiro; Cruzeiro; Vasco da Gama; Flamengo; Internacional; Palmeiras (All qualified by the CBF ranking)
- Matches: 339
- Goals: 1,025 (3.02 per match)
- Top goalscorer: Luís Fabiano; Rodrigo Fabri; (19 goals each)
- Average attendance: 19,028

The 2002 Campeonato Brasileiro Série A, known as Troféu Visa Electron by sponsorship reasons, was the 46th edition of the Campeonato Brasileiro Série A. It began on August 10, 2002, and reached its end on December 15, 2002. It was the last championship with a knockout stage. The competition was won by Santos.

== Format ==
The 26 teams played against each other once. The eight best placed teams qualified for the quarter-finals, in which the eight-placed team played against the first-placed team, the seventh-placed team played against the second-placed team, the sixth-placed team played against the third-placed team, and the fifth-placed team played against the fourth-placed team. The quarter-finals, semi-finals and finals were played over two legs. The four lowest-placed teams in the first stage were relegated to the Campeonato Brasileiro Série B of the following year.

== First Stage standings ==
Pos	Team	Pld	W	D	L	GF	GA	GD	Pts	Qualification
1	São Paulo	25	16	4	5	57	35	+22	52	Qualified for quarter-finals
2	São Caetano	25	14	5	6	42	28	+14	47	Qualified for quarter-finals
3	Corinthians	25	12	7	6	37	35	+2	43	Qualified for quarter-finals
4	Juventude	25	12	5	8	34	30	+4	41	Qualified for quarter-finals
5	Grêmio	25	11	8	6	39	29	+10	41	Qualified for quarter-finals
6	Atlético Mineiro	25	12	4	9	49	43	+6	40	Qualified for quarter-finals
7	Fluminense	25	12	4	9	43	46	−3	40	Qualified for quarter-finals
8	Santos	25	11	6	8	46	36	+10	39	Qualified for quarter-finals
9	Cruzeiro	25	11	6	8	40	39	+1	39	
10	Vitória	25	11	4	10	46	42	+4	37	
11	Coritiba	25	11	3	11	34	34	0	36	
12	Goiás	25	10	6	9	42	39	+3	36	
13	Ponte Preta	25	10	4	11	35	34	+1	34	
14	Atlético-PR	25	9	7	9	39	33	+6	34	
15	Vasco	25	10	3	12	37	38	−1	33	
16	Guarani	25	9	6	10	32	35	−3	33	
17	Figueirense	25	9	4	12	34	43	−9	31	
18	Flamengo	25	8	6	11	38	39	−1	30	
19	Bahia	25	8	6	11	35	37	−2	30	
20	Paysandu	25	9	2	14	35	46	−11	29	
21	Internacional	25	7	8	10	36	37	−1	29	
22	Paraná	25	8	4	13	37	42	−5	28	
23	Portuguesa	25	7	6	12	26	40	−14	27	Relegation zone
24	Palmeiras	25	6	9	10	37	46	−9	27	Relegation zone
25	Gama	25	7	4	14	30	39	−9	25	Relegation zone
26	Botafogo	25	6	7	12	24	39	−15	25	Relegation zone

Source: https://www.rsssfbrasil.com/tablesae/br2002.htm

== Final stage ==
Quarterfinals
1	São Paulo	1	1
8	Santos	3	2
4	Grêmio	0	1
5	Juventude	0	0
2	Corinthians	6	2
7	Atlético Mineiro	2	1
3	Fluminense	3	0
6	São Caetano	0	2

Semifinals
Santos	3	0
Grêmio	0	1
Corinthians	0	3
Fluminense	1	2

Finals
Santos	2	3
Corinthians	0	2

== Finals ==
December 8, 2002
17:00 (UTC-3)

Santos	2 – 0	Corinthians
Alberto 15'; Renato 89'

Morumbi (São Paulo)
Attendance: 58,534
Referee: Antônio Pereira da Silva Goiás

Santos: Fábio Costa; Michel, Preto, Alex and Léo, Paulo Almeida, Renato, Elano and Diego; Robinho and Alberto. Head coach: Émerson Leão.

Corinthians: Doni; Rogério, Fábio Luciano, Scheidt and Kléber; Vampeta, Fabrício and Renato (Leandro); Deivid (Marcinho), Guilherme and Gil. Head coach: Carlos Alberto Parreira.

December 15, 2002
17:00 (UTC-3)

Corinthians	2 – 3	Santos
Deivid 75'; Anderson 84'		Robinho (pen.) 37'; Elano 88'; Léo 90'+2'

Morumbi (São Paulo)
Attendance: 74,592
Referee: Carlos Eugênio Simon Rio Grande do Sul

Corinthians: Doni; Rogério, Fábio Luciano, Anderson and Kléber; Vampeta, Fabinho (Fabrício) and Renato (Marcinho); Deivid, Guilherme (Leandro) and Gil. Head coach: Carlos Alberto Parreira.

Santos: Fábio Costa; Maurinho, André Luís, Alex and Léo; Paulo Almeida, Renato, Elano and Diego (Robert, and then Michel); Robinho and William (Alexandre). Head coach: Émerson Leão.

== Final standings ==
Pos	Team	Pld	W	D	L	GF	GA	GD	Pts	Qualification or relegation
1	Santos	31	16	6	9	59	41	+18	54	Champions and runners-up, and qualified to Copa Libertadores 2003
2	Corinthians	31	15	7	9	50	46	+4	52	Champions and runners-up, and qualified to Copa Libertadores 2003
3	Grêmio	29	13	9	7	41	32	+9	48	Eliminated in the Semifinals and qualified to Copa Libertadores 2003
4	Fluminense	29	14	4	11	49	51	−2	46	Eliminated in the Semifinals
5	São Paulo	27	16	4	7	59	40	+19	52	Eliminated in the Quarterfinals
6	São Caetano	27	15	5	7	44	31	+13	50	Eliminated in the Quarterfinals
7	Juventude	27	12	6	9	34	31	+3	42	Eliminated in the Quarterfinals
8	Atlético Mineiro	27	12	4	11	52	51	+1	40	Eliminated in the Quarterfinals
9	Cruzeiro	25	11	6	8	40	39	+1	39	Eliminated in the First Stage
10	Vitória	25	11	4	10	46	42	+4	37	Eliminated in the First Stage
11	Coritiba	25	11	3	11	34	34	0	36	Eliminated in the First Stage
12	Goiás	25	10	6	9	42	39	+3	36	Eliminated in the First Stage
13	Ponte Preta	25	10	4	11	35	34	+1	34	Eliminated in the First Stage
14	Atlético-PR	25	9	7	9	39	33	+6	34	Eliminated in the First Stage
15	Vasco	25	10	3	12	37	38	−1	33	Eliminated in the First Stage
16	Guarani	25	9	6	10	32	35	−3	33	Eliminated in the First Stage
17	Figueirense	25	9	4	12	34	43	−9	31	Eliminated in the First Stage
18	Flamengo	25	8	6	11	38	39	−1	30	Eliminated in the First Stage
19	Bahia	25	8	6	11	35	37	−2	30	Eliminated in the First Stage
20	Paysandu	25	9	2	14	35	46	−11	29	Eliminated in the First Stage
21	Internacional	25	7	8	10	36	37	−1	29	Eliminated in the First Stage
22	Paraná	25	8	4	13	37	42	−5	28	Eliminated in the First Stage
23	Portuguesa	25	7	6	12	26	40	−14	27	Relegated to Série B 2003
24	Palmeiras	25	6	9	10	37	46	−9	27	Relegated to Série B 2003
25	Gama	25	7	4	14	30	39	−9	25	Relegated to Série B 2003
26	Botafogo	25	6	7	12	24	39	−15	25	Relegated to Série B 2003

== Top scorers ==
Pos.	Scorer	Club	Goals
1	(Brazil) Luís Fabiano	São Paulo	19
1	(Brazil) Rodrigo Fabri	Grêmio	19
2	(Brazil) Dimba	Gama	17
3	(Brazil) Romário	Fluminense	16
4	(Brazil) Ramon	Vasco	15
4	(Brazil) Mancini	Atlético Mineiro	15
5	(Brazil) Liédson	Flamengo	14
6	(Brazil) Deivid	Corinthians	13
6	(Brazil) Maurílio	Paraná	13
6	(Brazil) Guilherme	Corinthians	13
