= Jean Carlos (footballer, born 1980) =

Brazilian footballer

Personal information
- Full name: Jean Carlos Macedo da Silva
- Date of birth: August 9, 1980 (age 46)
- Place of birth: Campinas, Brazil
- Height: 1.74 m (5 ft 9 in)
- Position: Attacking midfielder

Team information
- Current team: Internacional

Youth career
- 1998–2002: Ponte Preta

Senior career*
Years	Team	Apps	(Gls)
2002 – 2003	Ponte Preta		
2004 – 2005	São Paulo		
2005	São Caetano		
2006	Ponte Preta Loan		
2007	Internacional Loan		
- * Club domestic league appearances and goals

Jean Carlos Macedo da Silva (born August 9, 1980 in Campinas), known as Jean Carlos or simply Jean, is a Brazilian attacking midfielder, currently playing for Sport Club Internacional on loan from São Caetano.

== Contract ==
- Inter (Loan) 5 February 2007 to 31 December 2007
- São Caetano 1 February 2006 to 31 January 2009
