= Bruno Ferraz =

Brazilian footballer (born 1984)

Personal information
- Full name: Bruno Ferraz das Neves
- Date of birth: June 11, 1984 (age 42)
- Place of birth: Porto Alegre, Brazil
- Height: 1.79 m (5 ft 10 in)
- Position: Attacking midfielder

Team information
- Current team: Mogi Mirim

Youth career
- 2000–2002: Grêmio

Senior career*
Years	Team	Apps	(Gls)
2001–2005	Grêmio	51	(3)
2006	Fluminense	5	(0)
2007	Porto Alegre		
2007	Joinville		
2008	Santa Cruz		
2008	Cruzeiro		
2009	Noroeste		
2009	Metropolitano		
2010	Porto Alegre		
2010	União Leiria		
2011	Consadole Sapporo	6	(0)
2012	Guarani	4	(0)
2013–	Mogi Mirim		
- * Club domestic league appearances and goals

Bruno Ferraz das Neves, or simply Bruno (born June 11, 1984), is a Brazilian football attacking midfielder.

== Career ==
=== Grêmio ===
Bruno Ferraz previously played for Grêmio in the Campeonato Brasileiro.
