= Renato (footballer, born 1979) =

Brazilian footballer

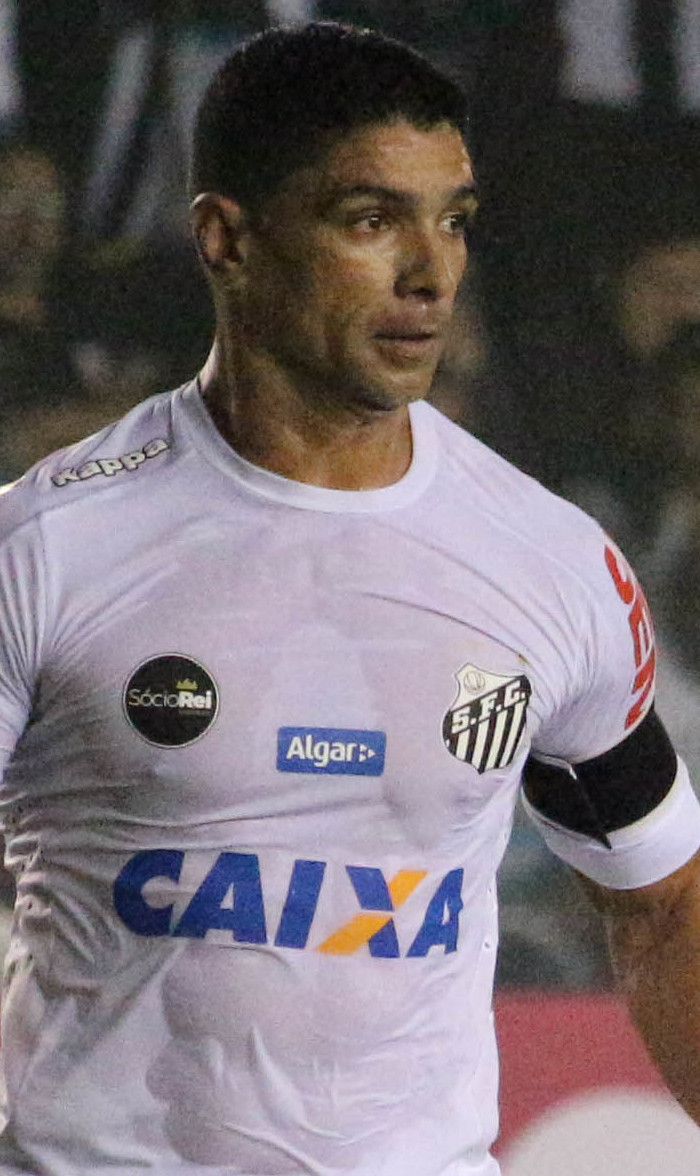
- Renato with Santos in 2017

Personal information
- Full name: Renato Dirnei Florêncio Santos
- Date of birth: 15 May 1979 (age 47)
- Place of birth: Santa Mercedes, Brazil
- Height: 1.78 m (5 ft 10 in)
- Position: Midfielder

Youth career
- Guarani

Senior career*
Years	Team	Apps	(Gls)
1996–2000	Guarani	89	(8)
2000–2004	Santos	161	(19)
2004–2011	Sevilla	204	(26)
2011–2014	Botafogo	102	(5)
2014–2018	Santos	162	(6)
Total		718	(64)

International career
2003–2005	Brazil	28	(0)
- * Club domestic league appearances and goals

Renato Dirnei Florêncio Santos (born 15 May 1979), known simply as Renato, is a Brazilian former professional footballer.

A central midfielder with good heading ability in spite of a small frame, he played most of his professional career in Spain with Sevilla, appearing in 286 official games with the club (39 goals scored).

A Brazilian international during two years, Renato was part of the squads that won one Copa América and one Confederations Cup.

== Club career ==
=== Guarani ===
Renato was born in Santa Mercedes, São Paulo. Known as Renatinho during his beginnings, he was a Guarani FC youth graduate, and made his senior debut on 17 April 1996 when he started in a 1–0 Campeonato Paulista home loss against São Paulo FC. He scored his first professional goal on 6 September 1998, netting the first in a 2–0 home win over Sport Club Internacional.

=== Santos ===
In June 2000, Renato moved to fellow top-level club Santos FC for a R$2 million fee. He made his competitive debut on 2 August, starting in a 2–0 home success over Esporte Clube Vitória.

Renato scored his first goal for the Fish on 7 February 2001, netting the first in a 3–0 home win against CR Vasco da Gama for the Torneio Rio–São Paulo championship. He added a further five during the campaign, being a regular starter.

In 2003, Renato scored a career-best nine goals in the year's Brasileirão, and was also an ever-present figure for the team in their Copa Libertadores run.

=== Sevilla ===
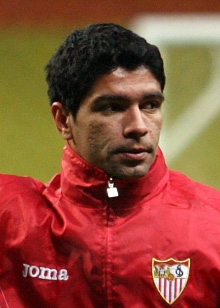
Renato in training with Sevilla

On 7 July 2004, Renato signed a five-year contract with Sevilla FC from Spain, aged 25. Alongside compatriots Adriano and Daniel Alves, as well as several club youth graduates, he would play an essential part in the Andalusians' La Liga consolidation, making his competition debut on 29 August: after just one minute on the pitch, in the start of the second half of the home fixture against Albacete Balompié, he scored the game's only goal.

From 2005 to 2007, Renato played 16 UEFA Cup games in both seasons combined, as Sevilla won the tournament twice in a row. His only goal was a decisive one, as he scored in the 2–0 home win against CA Osasuna in the second leg of the semi-finals of the 2006–07 edition (2–1 on aggregate); he was also utilized in both finals.

In the 2008–09 season, Renato netted eight times in 32 matches to help the side finish in third position. Four of those came from December 2008 to January 2009, against Real Madrid (4–3 win, away), Villarreal CF (1–0, at home), Deportivo de La Coruña (3–1 triumph, away) and CD Numancia (1–0, at home).

On 4 October 2009, Renato scored through a header in a 2–1 home win against Real Madrid. He contributed with 33 games and four goals to Sevilla's fourth-place finish, with the subsequent qualification to the UEFA Champions League; at the end of the campaign he extended his link to the club for a further year, until June 2012.

=== Botafogo ===
On 26 May 2011, Renato cut ties with Sevilla by mutual agreement and signed a three-year contract with Botafogo de Futebol e Regatas. He was a regular starter during his first two years at the club, forming a strong midfield unit alongside internationals Nicolás Lodeiro and Clarence Seedorf, but later served as a backup to Gabriel; he was also marred by injuries during the 2013 season.

=== Santos return ===
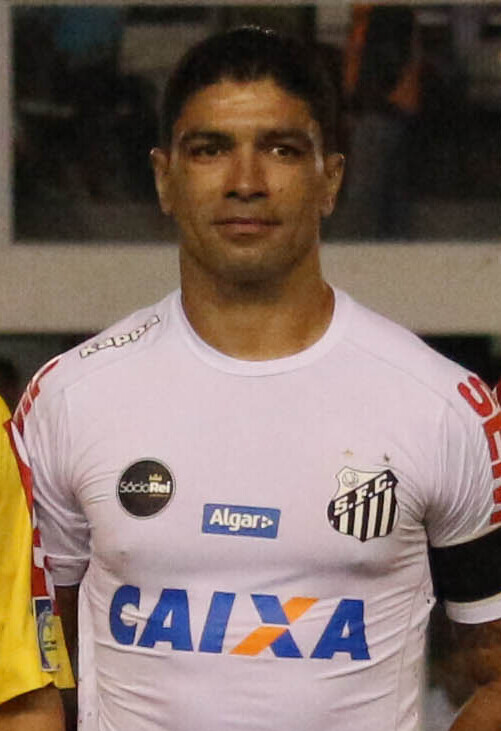
Renato in action for Santos in 2017

On 13 May 2014, Renato left Botafogo and returned to Santos, signing a deal until the end of the campaign. He was named among the substitutes two days later, but remained unused during the 4–2 home win against Princesa do Solimões Esporte Clube.

After struggling with injuries, Renato was mainly used as a backup to Arouca and Alison, playing as a defensive midfielder. On 13 January 2015, despite appearing in only 14 matches after his return, he renewed his contract for a further year.

On 1 March 2015, Renato scored his first goal after his return, netting his team's second in a 4–2 home win over Clube Atlético Linense. He was a regular starter during the season, partnering Thiago Maia and contributing with 53 appearances and two goals.

On 13 April 2016, aged already 36, Renato agreed to an extension with Santos until the end of 2017. The following 27 January, after being an ever-present figure during the year, he renewed his contract until December 2018.

On 18 September 2018, Renato was announced the new director of football of Santos in immediate effect, whilst acting also as a player until the expiration of his contract. He announced his retirement on 24 November, and played his last match hours later, after replacing goalscorer Gabriel late into a 3–2 home win against Atlético Mineiro; he represented the club in 425 matches, scoring 33 goals and winning four titles.

== International career ==
Renato made his debut for Brazil in 2003, being picked for the squads at the 2004 Copa América and the 2005 FIFA Confederations Cup: in the former he played all six matches – all minutes – and made five substitute appearances in the latter, with the national side winning both competitions.

== Career statistics ==
=== Club ===
Appearances and goals by club, season and competition
Club	Season	League			Cup		Continental		State League		Other		Total	
Club	Season	Division	Apps	Goals	Apps	Goals	Apps	Goals	Apps	Goals	Apps	Goals	Apps	Goals
Guarani	1996	Série A	3	0	—		—		1	0	—		4	0
Guarani	1997	Série A	0	0	—		—		8	0	—		8	0
Guarani	1998	Série A	12	1	—		—		10	0	—		22	1
Guarani	1999	Série A	19	4	6	0	—		15	1	3 (Note: Appearances in 1999 Campeonato Brasileiro Série A play-offs)	0	43	5
Guarani	2000	Série A	0	0	3	0	—		21	2	—		24	2
Guarani	Total		34	5	9	0	—		55	3	3	0	101	8
Santos	2000	Série A	23	0	0	0	—		—		—		23	0
Santos	2001	Série A	24	1	4	1	—		15	3	6 (Note: Appearance(s) in Torneio Rio–São Paulo)	1	49	6
Santos	2002	Série A	31	2	1	0	—		0	0	9	0	41	2
Santos	2003	Série A	44	9	—		18 (Note: 13 appearances and one goal in Copa Libertadores, five appearances in Copa Sudamericana)	1	6	0	—		68	10
Santos	2004	Série A	5	0	—		9 (Note: Appearance(s) in Copa Libertadores)	1	13	4	—		27	5
Santos	Total		127	12	5	1	27	2	34	7	15	1	208	23
Sevilla	2004–05	La Liga	33	3	4	0	7 (Note: Appearance(s) in UEFA Cup)	1	—		—		44	4
Sevilla	2005–06	La Liga	21	1	1	0	9	0	—		—		31	1
Sevilla	2006–07	La Liga	33	4	6	0	8	1	—		1 (Note: Appearance(s) in UEFA Super Cup)	1	48	6
Sevilla	2007–08	La Liga	28	4	4	0	6 (Note: Appearance(s) in UEFA Champions League)	2	—		3 (Note: Two appearances in Supercopa de España, one appearance in UEFA Super Cup)	3	41	9
Sevilla	2008–09	La Liga	32	8	8	0	5	2	—		—		45	10
Sevilla	2009–10	La Liga	33	4	7	1	5	1	—		—		45	6
Sevilla	2010–11	La Liga	24	2	3	1	4 (Note: Two appearances in UEFA Champions League, two appearances in UEFA Europa League)	0	—		1 (Note: Appearance(s) in Supercopa de España)	0	32	3
Sevilla	Total		204	26	33	2	44	7	0	0	5	4	286	39
Botafogo	2011	Série A	28	1	—		0	0	—		—		28	1
Botafogo	2012	Série A	28	0	5	1	2 (Note: Appearance(s) in Copa Sudamericana)	1	19	2	—		54	4
Botafogo	2013	Série A	23	1	6	0	—		4	0	—		33	1
Botafogo	2014	Série A	—		0	0	2	0	9	1	—		11	1
Botafogo	Total		79	3	11	1	4	1	23	2	0	0	126	7
Santos	2014	Série A	11	0	3	0	—		—		—		14	0
Santos	2015	Série A	25	0	11	0	—		17	2	—		53	2
Santos	2016	Série A	38	2	5	1	—		16	0	—		59	3
Santos	2017	Série A	23	0	3	0	8	1	6	0	—		40	1
Santos	2018	Série A	17	1	2	0	4	0	9	1	—		32	2
Santos	Total		114	3	24	1	12	1	48	3	—		198	8
Career total			558	49	82	5	87	11	169	15	23	5	919	85

=== International ===
Appearances and goals by national team and year
National team	Year	Apps	Goals
Brazil	2003	4	0
Brazil	2004	12	0
Brazil	2005	11	0
Total		27	0

== Honours ==
Santos

- Campeonato Brasileiro Série A: 2002, 2004
- Campeonato Paulista: 2015, 2016
- Copa do Brasil runner-up: 2015

Sevilla

- Copa del Rey: 2006–07, 2009–10
- Supercopa de España: 2007
- UEFA Cup: 2005–06, 2006–07
- UEFA Super Cup: 2006

Botafogo

- Campeonato Carioca: 2013

Brazil

- Copa América: 2004
- FIFA Confederations Cup: 2005

Individual

- Bola de Prata: 2003
