= Flávio (footballer, born September 1975) =

Brazilian footballer

Personal information
- Full name: Flávio Luis da Silva
- Date of birth: September 22, 1975 (age 51)
- Place of birth: Sirinhaém, Brazil
- Height: 1.78 m (5 ft 10 in)
- Position: Defender

Senior career*
Years	Team	Apps	(Gls)
2001–2002	Palmeiras	44	(17)
2003	Internacional	10	(5)
2004	Ponte Preta	18	(8)
2005	Ankaragücü	3	(0)
2005	Figueirense	17	(2)
2006	Náutico	19	(4)
2007	Ceará	14	(5)
2008–2009	Barueri	15	(4)
- * Club domestic league appearances and goals

Flávio Luis da Silva or simply Flávio (born September 12, 1975 in Sirinhaém), is a former Brazilian defender, he last plays for Barueri.

== Career ==
Flávio joined on 30 July 2009 on trial to FC Schalke 04 and will eventually retiring, after failing from the trail retired on 13 August 2009.
