= Robinho =

Brazilian footballer (born 1984)

- Robinho in 2006

Personal information
- Full name: Robson de Souza
- Date of birth: 25 January 1984 (age 42)
- Place of birth: São Vicente, Brazil
- Height: 1.72 m (5 ft 8 in)
- Position: Forward

Youth career
- 1996–2002: Santos

Senior career*
Years	Team	Apps	(Gls)
2002–2005	Santos	108	(47)
2005–2008	Real Madrid	101	(25)
2008–2010	Manchester City	41	(14)
2010	→ Santos (loan)	14	(5)
2010–2015	AC Milan	108	(25)
2014–2015	→ Santos (loan)	41	(17)
2015–2016	Guangzhou Evergrande	10	(3)
2016–2017	Atlético Mineiro	80	(31)
2018–2019	Sivasspor	30	(12)
2019–2020	İstanbul Başakşehir	32	(4)
2020	Santos	0	(0)
Total		542	(173)

International career
2004	Brazil U23	8	(3)
2003–2017	Brazil	100	(28)
Medal record
Men's Football
Representing Brazil
FIFA Confederations Cup
Winner	2009 South Africa
Winner	2005 Germany
Copa América
Winner	2007 Venezuela
CONCACAF Gold Cup
Runner-up	2003 United States–Mexico
- * Club domestic league appearances and goals

Robson de Souza (Brazilian Portuguese: [ˈʁɔb(i)sõ d(ʒi) ˈsowzɐ]; born 25 January 1984), known as Robinho (Brazilian Portuguese: [ʁɔˈbĩɲu]), is a Brazilian former professional footballer who played as a forward.

In 1996, at 12 years of age, Robinho was picked by Brazil legend Pelé as his heir apparent and, in 2002, went on to lead Santos to their first Campeonato Brasileiro title since Pelé himself played for the club. Afterwards he went on to win a second title with Santos, two more with Spanish club Real Madrid, and the Italian Serie A title in his first season at Milan. At international level, Robinho has won one Copa América title and two FIFA Confederations Cups with the Brazil national team, and played at two FIFA World Cups.

In 2017, an Italian court convicted Robinho of sexual assault in the 2013 gang rape of a woman at a Milan nightclub. This conviction was upheld by the Milan Court of Appeals, and subsequently upheld by Italy's top court in January 2022. Italy's request for extradition was rejected by Brazil, because the Constitution of Brazil does not allow extradition of Brazilian nationals. In March 2024, Robinho began serving his nine-year prison term for the conviction in Brazil.

== Club career ==
=== Santos ===
Robinho was born in São Vicente, São Paulo State. In his early years, Robinho played a lot of futsal which was responsible for developing his dribbling and acceleration skills. He signed his first professional contract with Santos in 2002 at the age of 18. He made 24 appearances in his debut season and scored one goal as Santos won the 2002 Campeonato Brasileiro. He reached the final of the 2003 Copa Libertadores with Santos, but lost in the final to Boca Juniors. In 2004, Robinho finished with 21 goals in 37 games and led Santos to win another Campeonato Brasileiro.

His form had brought him to the attention of many European clubs in the summer of 2004, but Robinho remained with Santos after the Brazilian club rejected all offers. His form suffered in the 2005 season, however, after his mother, Marina da Silva Souza, was kidnapped by gunmen at her Praia Grande home on 6 November; she was released unharmed six weeks later after a ransom was paid.

Robinho scored nine goals in 12 league games, and his value continued to increase as his talent became more and more apparent to the powers of European football. Santos began to realise it would become increasingly difficult to hold on to their star player. In July 2005, Spanish giants Real Madrid signed Robinho by agreeing to pay a fee equal to 60% of the buyout clause in his contract belonging to Santos (€24 million).

=== Real Madrid ===
Robinho was given the number 10 shirt for Real Madrid, previously worn by Luís Figo. Robinho made 37 appearances and scored 14 goals in his first season. At the start of the 2006–07 season, Robinho spent much of the first few months of the season selected as a substitute by manager Fabio Capello, even after being Man of the Match in the first Clásico against Barcelona that year. Only after the winter break did Robinho find himself in the starting XI, later playing a crucial role as Real Madrid won their 30th La Liga title that year. The title was the third league championship of his career.

Capello was subsequently fired, however, and Bernd Schuster was appointed as head coach of Real Madrid. Robinho finished with 11 league goals and eight assists for Madrid in the 2007–08 La Liga season, as well as four goals during Real Madrid's Champions League campaign. Robinho then got injured at the beginning of the second half of the season. He did not recover fully enough to help Madrid against Roma in the Champions League. The week before, however, Robinho saved Real Madrid's La Liga title hopes with a two-goal performance on 3 March 2008 as Madrid defeated Recreativo de Huelva away from home. That game kept a resurgent Barcelona at bay and ultimately secured Real Madrid's 31st league title and Robinho's fourth.

Robinho was Real Madrid's third-highest scorer during his Madrid years, behind strikers Raúl and Ruud van Nistelrooy. He was also the player with the second-most assists, behind Guti, and the only Madrid player, along with goalkeeper Iker Casillas, to finish in the top ten of the Ballon d'Or and FIFA World Player of the Year nominations for 2007–08.

Real Madrid president Ramón Calderón had promised to negotiate a new contract with Robinho at the midpoint of the 2007–08 season, which never materialised. Calderón, however, insisted talks would occur in the summer; again Calderón went back on his word. Robinho subsequently revealed talks never began because Madrid hoped to use him as part of the deal to bring Cristiano Ronaldo to Real Madrid in the summer of 2008. After the failed move for Ronaldo, Madrid finally attempted to negotiate a new contract with Robinho, which he rejected and led to him pursuing a transfer to Chelsea.

=== Manchester City ===
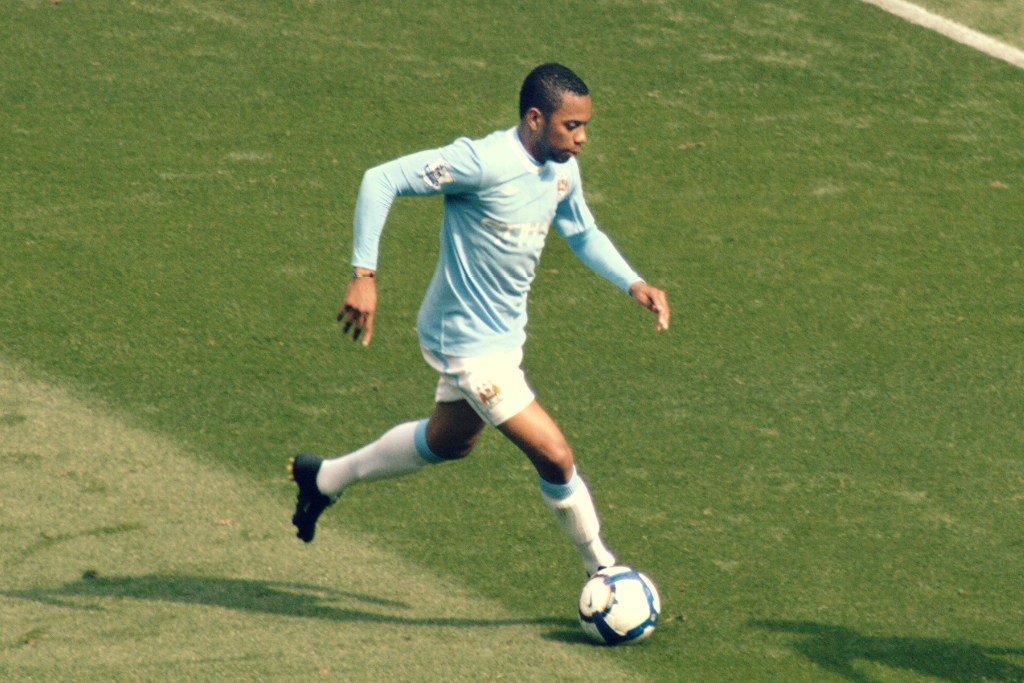
Robinho playing for Manchester City in 2009

On 1 September 2008, the final day of the Premier League summer transfer window, Robinho completed a €41–42 million (£32.5M) move to Manchester City on a four-year deal. This occurred on the same day the club was bought out by the Arab investment company Abu Dhabi United Group.

Robinho had previously been linked with a transfer to Chelsea, and he had emphasised his desire to play for the London club up to the eve of the transfer. On 27 August, Chelsea chief executive Peter Kenyon said that the club were "confident" that the transaction would go through, and Madrid had also given their consent for the player to leave. Robinho's expectancy to move to Chelsea was such that upon signing for Manchester City he accidentally stated, "On the last day, Chelsea made a great proposal and I accepted." To this comment, a reporter then replied, "You mean Manchester, right?" "Yeah, Manchester, sorry!" answered Robinho.

In an interview with The Guardian, Robinho stated that Manchester City being a big club and the presence of Brazilian friends Jô and Elano were incentives for him to join the team. He made his team debut and scored his first Premier League goal on 13 September 2008, coincidentally in a 3–1 home defeat to Chelsea. On 26 October, he scored his first Premier League hat-trick against Stoke City, and he scored his first European goal for Manchester City in a 3–2 UEFA Cup group stage win over Twente on 6 November. He was given the captain's armband for the match against Hull City, due to Richard Dunne's suspension, which ended in a 2–2 draw.

On 19 April, Robinho scored his 13th league goal for Manchester City in the 2–1 win away at Everton on 25 April, City's first away win since 31 August 2008. The following week, he scored his third consecutive goal in three games, against Blackburn Rovers, to help Manchester City to a 3–1 win. Robinho finished the season as City's top goalscorer with 14 and the fourth top scorer in the league.

His second season at Manchester City did not go as well. He missed three months of the season due to injury and only played 12 games in total (ten in the Premier League), and scored one goal (against lower league club Scunthorpe United in the FA Cup). Due to this, he fell down the pecking order and sought a move away from the club in the January transfer window.

==== Return to Santos (loan) ====
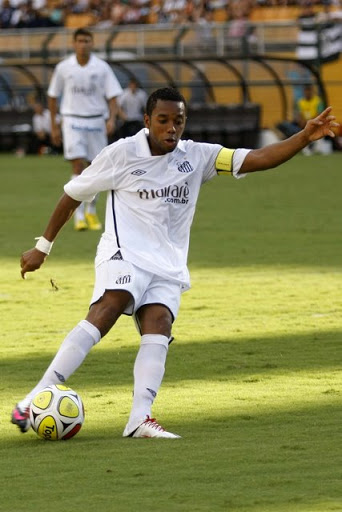
Robinho playing for Santos in the 2010 season

On 28 January 2010, Robinho returned to his home club Santos due to moving down the pecking order at Manchester City, joining them on a six-month loan deal. He had publicly stated that at Manchester City he would play every other game, and because of the upcoming World Cup, he wanted to play every game, and so returned to Brazil with Santos after declining a move to São Paulo. On his return to Santos, Robinho scored a backheel against aforementioned admirers São Paulo with five minutes to spare to complete a 2–1 victory for the Peixe. In the final match of his loan deal on 4 August, Robinho helped Santos win the Copa do Brasil. Although Santos lost 2–1 to Vitória, they won the tie 3–2 on aggregate to win the competition for the first time in their history. Shortly afterwards, Robinho stated that he wanted to remain with Santos rather than return to England. Manchester City, however, refused to extend the loan deal and Santos failed to make a transfer bid.

Robinho returned to training with Manchester City in August 2010, but stated that he was seeking a move away from the club before the end of the summer transfer window on 31 August. Turkish clubs Fenerbahçe and Beşiktaş opened transfer negotiations with City, but Robinho rejected a move to Turkey, declaring that he would rather move to a club in Spain or Italy.

=== AC Milan ===
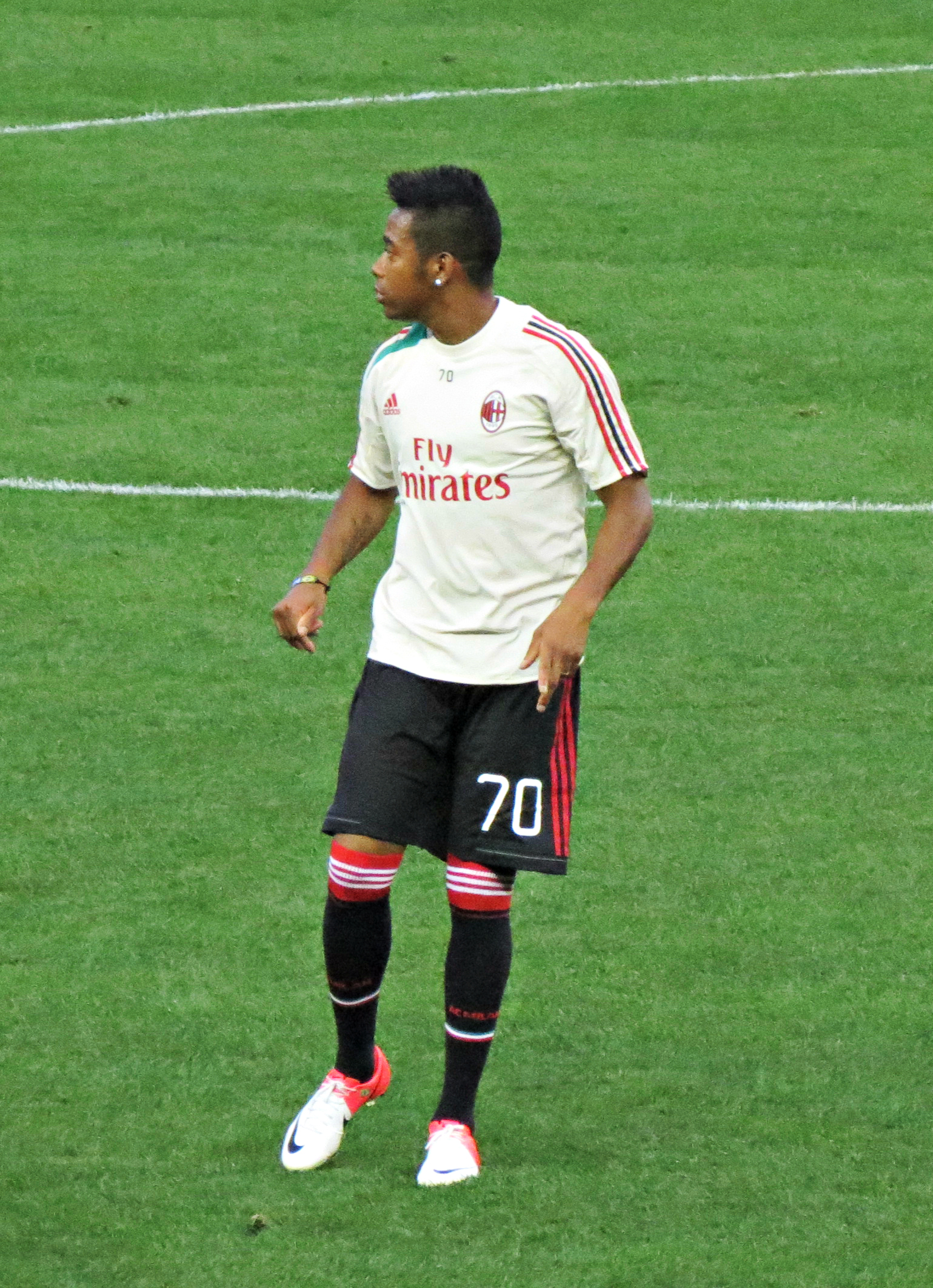
Robinho with AC Milan in 2012

==== 2010–11 season ====
On 31 August 2010, Robinho moved to AC Milan from Manchester City for a fee of £15 million (€18M), signing a four-year contract. He made his debut as a substitute in a 2–0 defeat to newly promoted Cesena. He started his first game with Milan in their 1–0 win over Genoa. He scored his first goal in injury time against Chievo to make the score 3–1 on 16 October 2010. He continued his goalscoring form with a goal the following week in a Serie A match against Napoli on 25 October 2010. He then scored the first goal for Milan against Sampdoria, but Giampaolo Pazzini equalised on the hour mark to end as a draw.

On 4 December 2010, Robinho scored the second goal for Milan against Brescia in their 3–0 win at the San Siro. Eight days later, on 12 December, he again scored the second goal in a 3–0 victory for Milan against Bologna. He scored his first goal of 2011 against Bari to give Milan another 3–0 victory. On 29 January, he scored against Catania following a deflection from a Zlatan Ibrahimović free-kick to give Milan a 1–0 lead, then assisted Ibrahimović to give Milan a 2–0 win. On 12 February 2011, he scored his first brace for Milan against Parma to help Milan to a 4–0 win. Against Cagliari, Robinho scored a brace in the 37th week of Serie-A on 14 May 2011, leading to celebrations of the Scudetto winners after the match.

==== 2011–12 season ====
He started the 2011–12 Serie A season well, taking part in Milan's win over Inter Milan in the Supercoppa Italiana. Scoring eleven goals in all competitions, Robinho helped Milan to a second-place finish in Serie A.

==== 2012–13 season ====
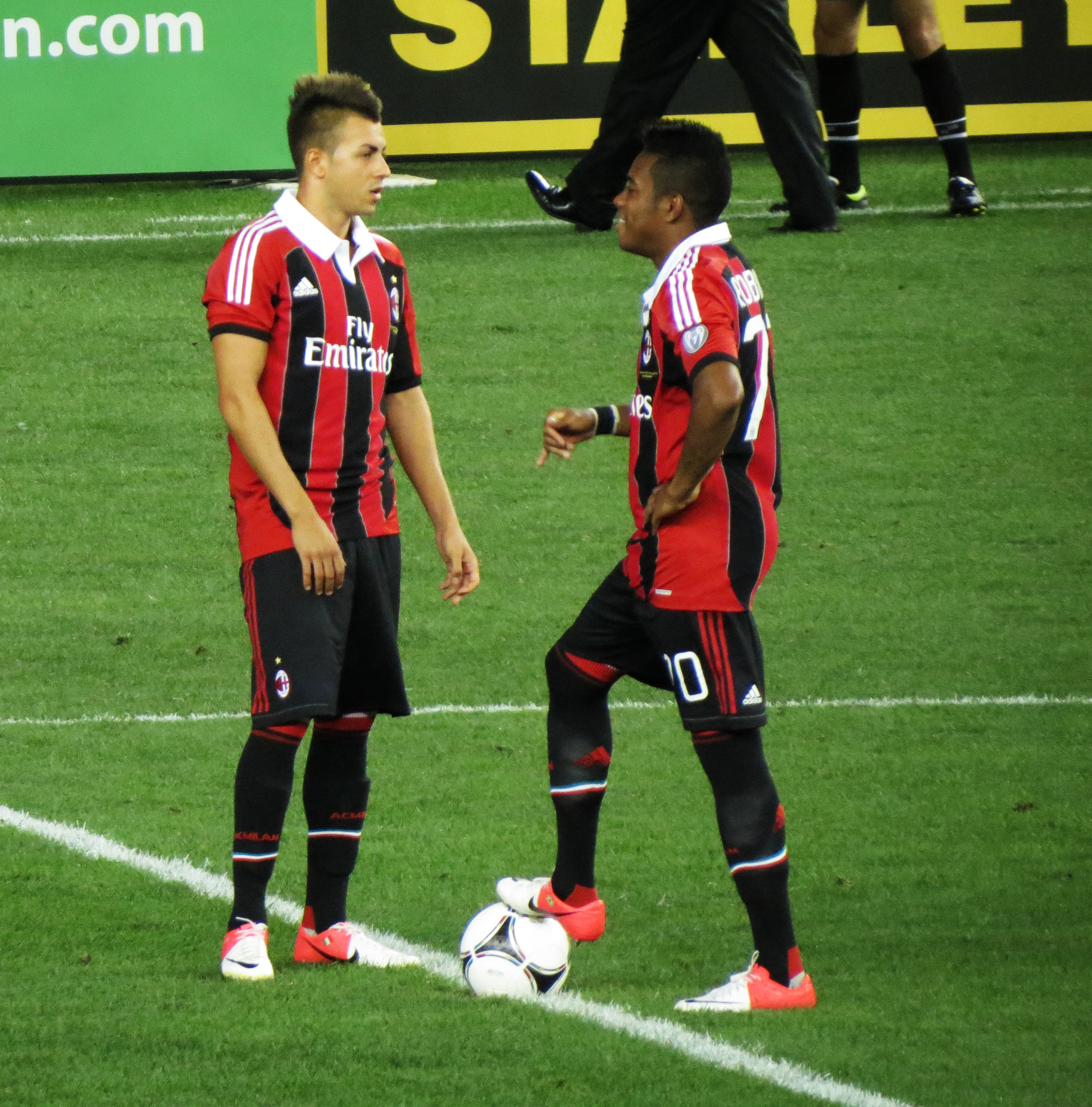
Robinho (right) and AC Milan teammate Stephan El Shaarawy at the centre circle (August 2012)

After Alexandre Pato took the number 9 jersey at Milan following the departure of club legend Filippo Inzaghi, Robinho was handed the number 7 jersey that previously belonged to Pato. Robinho started in Milan's first game of the 2012–13 Serie A against Sampdoria, but was replaced by Urby Emanuelson due to an injury. Robinho made his comeback as a substitute against Cagliari, where Milan won 2–0. Four days later, Milan drew against Parma in an away match where Robinho came on as a substitute. Robinho came on as a substitute again against Inter, but Milan eventually lost 1–0. Robinho was then injured in training and was sidelined for the next five games. He made his comeback against Málaga as a substitute in the 80th minute; the game ended as a draw. He scored his first goal of the season against Juventus, which was the winner in a 1–0 victory on 25 November 2012.

Robinho was close to signing with old club Santos in both January 2013 and July 2013, but the move fell through on both occasions due to the player's wage demands. On both occasions, Santos managed to reach an agreement with Milan over the transfer fee.

On 18 July 2013, Robinho signed a new contract with Milan on a reduced wage, keeping him with the Rossoneri until 2016. His previous deal was set to expire on 30 June 2014.

==== 2013–14 season ====
Robinho suffered a groin strain early in the pre-season against Valencia on 27 July 2013, which disrupted his preparation for the upcoming season. Before he suffered the injury in the match, he missed a penalty, but scored a goal from open play less than a minute later.

On 22 October, Robinho scored the opening goal in the 2013–14 Champions League match against Group H favourites Barcelona, from a pass by his compatriot Kaká. After Lionel Messi's equaliser, however, he missed an excellent opportunity to score another goal in the second half, after which the match ended in a 1–1 draw. In November, he was sidelined again, this time due to a dislocated shoulder, an injury he picked up during the match against Celtic in the Champions League.

Robinho scored his only goal in Milan's Coppa Italia campaign at the San Siro in the quarter-finals against Spezia on 15 January 2014. He opened the scoring with a close-range header in a 3–1 victory against the Serie B club. In February, an injury of his left thigh prevented him from playing in the first leg of the Champions League first knockout round against Atlético Madrid. He made a substitute appearance during the second leg in Spain, but was unable to prevent a 5–1 aggregate defeat against the Rojiblancos.

==== Second return to Santos (loan) ====
On 6 August 2014, Robinho arrived in São Paulo–Guarulhos International Airport and subsequently returned to Santos in a one-year loan deal. Despite being out of new coach Filippo Inzaghi's plans, the Italian side still will pay Robinho's wages—while Peixe pays R$600,000 per month, Milan will pay another R$400,000.

Robinho was presented on the following day, stating a desire to play in the following match against fierce rivals Corinthians. He made his re-debut for Peixe on 10 August, starting in a 0–1 eventual home loss.

Robinho scored his first goal after his return four days later, netting the first and assisting Rildo in a 2–0 home success over Londrina in the Copa do Brasil championship. His second goal came on the 29th, in a 2–0 away win over Grêmio in the same tournament.

On 13 September, Robinho scored his first Brasileirão goal, netting his side's second in a 2–1 home win over Coritiba. He scored again on 21 September with a left-footed strike in a 3–1 victory over Figueirense. On 30 June 2015, after already rescinding his link with Milan in May, he left Peixe after his contract expired.

=== Guangzhou Evergrande ===
On 16 July 2015, Robinho signed a six-month contract with Chinese Super League side Guangzhou Evergrande Taobao, managed by compatriot Luiz Felipe Scolari and linking up with his international teammate Paulinho. On 23 July 2015, he made his unofficial debut for Guangzhou in an international friendly against Bayern Munich. He won the Chinese Super League in the 2015 season.

On 1 February 2016, Robinho became a free agent after his contract expired with Guangzhou.

=== Atlético Mineiro ===
On 11 February 2016, after 10 days being released Robinho signed a two-year contract with Atlético Mineiro.

Robinho was the highest goal scorer in Brazil in 2016, with 25 goals. He was selected for the Campeonato Brasileiro team of the year, in both the Craque do Brasileirão and the Bola de Prata awards.

Robinho scored a goal in the 2017 Campeonato Mineiro final over rivals Cruzeiro, which secured Atlético the title.

He left the club at the expiry of his contract in December 2017, having scored a total of 38 goals in 109 matches.

=== Sivasspor and İstanbul Başakşehir ===
On 23 January 2018, Robinho signed for Turkish Süper Lig club Sivasspor. On 1 January 2019, he signed for İstanbul Başakşehir in the same league for a fee of $2.78m. He was a member of the 2019–20 Süper Lig winning squad, the first top flight title in the club's history.

=== Third return to Santos ===
On 10 October 2020, Robinho rejoined Santos on a deal running until February 2021, with the option for an extension until December 2022. The announcement was met with criticism due to Robinho's trial court conviction of sexual assault in Italy. One of Santos' sponsors ended their deal with the club, stating that the signing was 'disrespectful to women', while others also pressed against it. On 16 October, Santos announced the suspension of his contract, stating that he would focus exclusively on his defence.

== International career ==
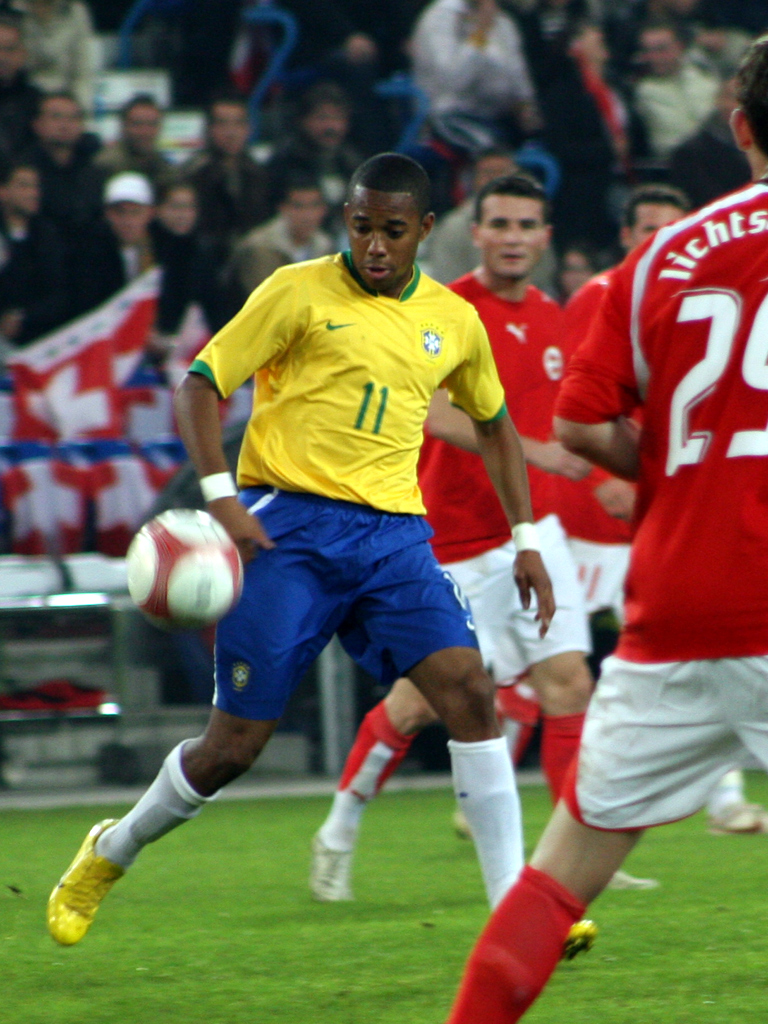
Robinho playing for Brazil against Switzerland in 2006

In July 2003, Robinho was called up for the 2003 CONCACAF Gold Cup, along with his Santos teammates Alex and Diego. Although Brazil chose to send their under-23 team, the CONCACAF Gold Cup matches are considered as full international matches by FIFA. He earned his first cap in the opening match on 13 July, which Brazil lost 1–0 to Mexico, and played four further matches including the golden goal defeat to the same team in the final.

Robinho's first cap with the full Brazil team came on 4 September 2004, as a 74th-minute substitute for Edu in a 3–1 home win over Bolivia in 2006 FIFA World Cup qualification. The following 9 February, he scored his first international goal in a 7–1 win away to Hong Kong. He went to the 2005 FIFA Confederations Cup in Germany, which Brazil went on to win. During the tournament, he partnered Adriano in attack and scored in group matches against Greece and Japan.

Robinho was named in Brazil's squad for the 2006 FIFA World Cup in Germany. During the tournament, he was mainly used as a substitute, with the established forwards Ronaldo, Ronaldinho, Adriano and Kaká starting in attack. However, he was named in the starting line-up for Brazil's third group match; a 4–1 defeat of Japan. He made a third substitute appearance of the tournament in Brazil's 1–0 quarter-final defeat by France.

In the absence of Brazil's World Cup forwards, Robinho was a regular starter for the team at the 2007 Copa América a year later. For the tournament, he wore the number 11 shirt, the same number that his childhood hero Romário wore. He scored all four of Brazil's group stage goals via a hat-trick in the 3–0 win against Chile, and a penalty in a 1–0 win over Ecuador. He then scored two goals in a 6–1 quarter-final win over Chile. Brazil went on to win the tournament, beating Argentina 3–0 in the final. Robinho finished as the Golden Boot winner in addition to being named the best player of the tournament.

In 2009, he was a member of the Brazil team that won the 2009 Confederations Cup in South Africa. He played in every game in the competition, as Brazil defeated the United States 3–2 in the final to win the tournament.

Robinho was named in Brazil's squad for the 2010 World Cup, where he played alongside Luís Fabiano in attack. He scored in the second round match against Chile as Brazil won 3–0 to advance to the quarter-finals. He then scored the opener in the quarter-final match against the Netherlands, but Brazil eventually lost 2–1 and was eliminated. A poor performance at the 2011 Copa América saw Robinho dropped and replaced by Jádson in the Brazilian line-up.

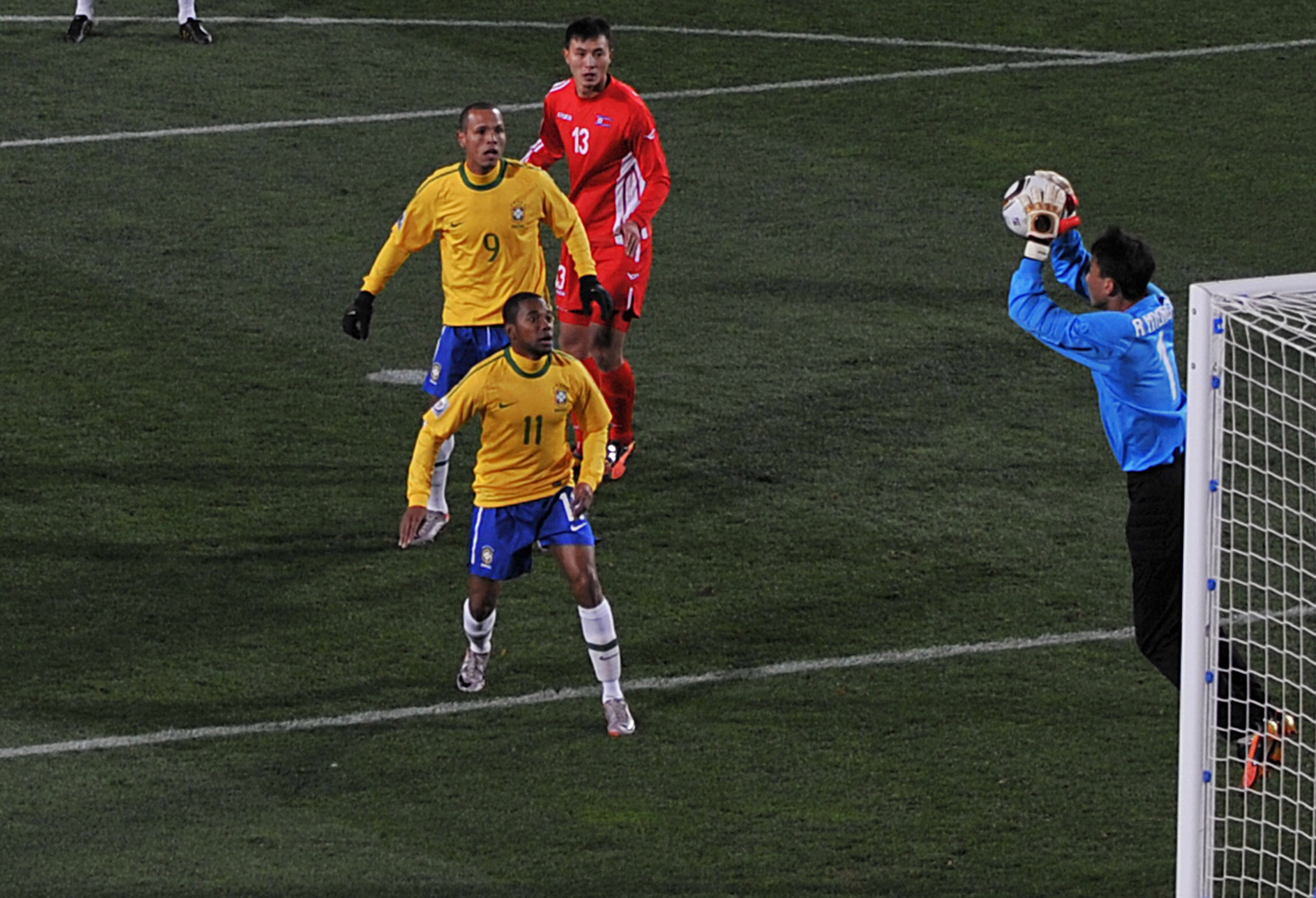
Robinho playing for Brazil at the 2010 FIFA World Cup

On 31 October 2013, after a hiatus of two years, Robinho was recalled to the Seleção by coach Luiz Felipe Scolari. He took part in two games against Honduras and Chile on 16 and 19 November respectively. During the game against Chile, he scored his first international goal since 2011. However, he was not included in Scolari's squad for the 2014 World Cup.

After the World Cup, returning coach Dunga recalled Robinho to the Brazil national squad. On 6 September 2014, he played 13 minutes as a substitute in Brazil's 1–0 win against Colombia in Miami. In May 2015, Robinho was included in Brazil's 23-man squad for the 2015 Copa América held in Chile. He started their final group game against Venezuela after Neymar was suspended for the entire tournament. In the ninth minute, Robinho sent in the corner from which Thiago Silva volleyed Brazil into the lead in an eventual 2–1 victory which sent them into the quarter-finals as group winners. On 27 June, Robinho scored the opening goal of the quarter-final with Paraguay, which Brazil eventually lost 4–3 in a penalty shootout.

Eighteen months after his 99th game, Robinho won his 100th international cap on 25 January 2017 in a 1–0 win against Colombia at the Olympic Stadium in Rio de Janeiro. An entirely home-based squad was chosen in tribute to the Chapecoense squad killed in LaMia Flight 2933 in Colombia weeks earlier, and Robinho lined up alongside his former Santos partner Diego.

== Style of play ==
A quick, creative, agile and technically gifted player, Robinho is mainly known for his flair, ball control, attacking instinct and dribbling skills, as well as his use of tricks and feints, such as the step over and the flip flap, due to his quick feet; his precocious performances and ability on the ball drew comparisons with compatriot Pelé in his youth. Usually deployed in a free role, he was capable of playing in several offensive positions, and often played as a winger, although he has also been used as a supporting forward, as a main striker, and even as an attacking midfielder on occasion, due to his tendency to be involved in the buildup of his teams' attacking plays, as well as his capacity to both score and create goals. Robinho has been criticised for his poor work-rate, lack of tactical discipline, and for his slender physique, which often leads him to go to ground easily. Despite the talent he demonstrated in his youth, his career has also been marked by inconsistency, and he has been accused by some in the sport of failing to live up to his potential.

== Personal life ==
In November 2004, Robinho's mother was kidnapped at gunpoint. She was released unharmed the following month.

In 2009, Robinho married Vivian Guglielminetti. The couple have two sons, born in 2007 and 2011, and a daughter born in 2015.

His son, Robson Junior, also became a professional footballer, and also started his career with Santos.

== Sexual crime and conviction ==
On 23 November 2017, an Italian court sentenced Robinho to nine years in prison after he and five other males were convicted of sexual assault in the January 2013 gang rape of a 22-year-old Albanian woman at a Milan nightclub. As part of the judgment, transcripts of Robinho's messages intercepted by police were released, including one from Robinho to a friend in January 2013 that said: "I'm laughing because I couldn't care less, the woman was completely drunk, she has no idea what happened." In a different chat, a friend of Robinho sent the message "I saw you when you put your penis inside her mouth", to which Robinho replied: "That doesn't mean having sex." Under Italian law, his sentencing would not be enforced until after the completion of the appeal process. At the time of the sentencing, Robinho was in Brazil, and under Brazilian law, a Brazilian citizen cannot be extradited to a foreign country.

On 10 December 2020, Robinho's nine-year prison sentence was upheld by the Italian courts after appeal. The Milan Court of Appeals found that Robinho had "belittled" and "brutally humiliated" the victim, while he also tried to mislead investigators from the onset by providing a false version of events he had agreed upon with his friend.

Italy's highest court, the Supreme Court of Cassation, upheld the conviction again in January 2022. In February 2022, an arrest warrant was given internationally against Robinho by the Ministry of Justice of Italy. On 4 October 2022, Italy formally requested Brazil to extradite him and his Brazilian friend Ricardo Falco, who was also convicted in the same gang rape case, which was denied by Brazilian courts a month later.

However, on 18 February 2023, the Italian government requested Brazil to order Robinho and his friend Falco to serve their sentences in Brazil, which is theoretically possible since a new Brazilian migration law allowing people convicted abroad (Brazilians included) to serve prison time in the country under certain requirements came into effect in 2017. On 24 February 2023, Brazil's Superior Court of Justice (STJ) subpoenaed Robinho and Falco and on 27 March Brazilian prosecutors agreed with the Italian government request. The court also ordered Robinho's passport to be confiscated and prohibited him from leaving Brazil. In August 2023, STJ denied a preliminary request by Robinho to get the complete Italian case file of the sentence translated into Portuguese. In February 2024, the Court scheduled for 20 March the ruling on Italy's government appeal to have the original sentence executed in Brazil. The Brazilian court upheld the Italian court's conviction; Robinho will serve his nine-year sentence in Brazil.

Aside from the incident in Milan, while Robinho was playing for Manchester City, he was questioned by police regarding a sexual assault at a nightclub in Leeds in January 2009. He cooperated with police and was released without charge.

== Career statistics ==
=== Club ===
Appearances and goals by club, season and competition
Club	Season	League			State League		National Cup		League Cup		Continental		Other		Total	
Club	Season	Division	Apps	Goals	Apps	Goals	Apps	Goals	Apps	Goals	Apps	Goals	Apps	Goals	Apps	Goals
Santos	2002	Série A	30	10	—		—		—		—		3 (Note: Appearances in Torneio Rio–São Paulo)	0	33	10
Santos	2003	Série A	32	9	6 (Note: Appearances in Campeonato Paulista)	0	—		—		20 (Note: Appearances in Copa Libertadores and Copa Sudamericana)	6	—		58	15
Santos	2004	Série A	35	21	10	7	—		—		10	4	—		55	32
Santos	2005	Série A	11	7	14	11	—		—		9 (Note: Appearances in Copa Libertadores)	6	—		34	24
Santos	Total		108	47	30	18	—		—		39	16	3	0	180	81
Real Madrid	2005–06	La Liga	37	8	—		6	4	—		8 (Note: Appearances in UEFA Champions League)	0	—		51	12
Real Madrid	2006–07	La Liga	32	6	—		4	1	—		7	1	—		43	8
Real Madrid	2007–08	La Liga	32	11	—		2	0	—		6	4	2 (Note: Appearance(s) in Supercopa de España)	0	42	15
Real Madrid	2008–09	La Liga	0	0	—		0	0	—		0	0	1	0	1	0
Real Madrid	Total		101	25	—		12	5	—		21	5	3	0	137	35
Manchester City	2008–09	Premier League	31	14	—		0	0	0	0	10 (Note: Appearances in UEFA Europa League)	1	0	0	41	15
Manchester City	2009–10	Premier League	10	0	—		1	1	1	0	—		—		12	1
Manchester City	Total		41	14	—		1	1	1	0	10	1	0	0	53	16
Santos (loan)	2010	Série A	2	0	12	5	8	6	—		0	0	—		22	11
AC Milan	2010–11	Serie A	34	14	—		4	1	—		7	0	—		45	15
AC Milan	2011–12	Serie A	28	6	—		3	1	—		8	3	1 (Note: Appearance in Supercoppa Italiana)	0	40	10
AC Milan	2012–13	Serie A	23	2	—		1	0	—		3	0	—		27	2
AC Milan	2013–14	Serie A	23	3	—		2	1	—		7	1	—		32	5
AC Milan	Total		108	25	—		10	3	—		25	4	1	0	144	32
Santos (loan)	2014	Série A	16	4	—		5	5	—		—		—		21	9
Santos (loan)	2015	Série A	4	2	13	5	3	1	—		0	0	—		20	8
Santos (loan)	Total		20	6	13	5	8	6	—		0	0	—		41	17
Guangzhou Evergrande	2015	Chinese Super League	10	3	—		0	0	—		—		1 (Note: Appearance in FIFA Club World Cup)	0	11	3
Atlético Mineiro	2016	Série A	30	12	10 (Note: Appearances in Campeonato Mineiro)	9	8	3	—		7	1	—		55	25
Atlético Mineiro	2017	Série A	30	7	10	3	4	1	—		7	2	3 (Note: Appearances in Primeira Liga)	0	54	13
Atlético Mineiro	Total		60	19	20	12	12	4	—		14	3	3	0	109	38
Sivasspor	2017–18	Süper Lig	14	4	—		0	0	—		—		—		14	4
Sivasspor	2018–19	Süper Lig	16	8	—		0	0	—		—		—		16	8
Sivasspor	Total		30	12	—		0	0	—		—		—		30	12
Istanbul Basaksehir	2018–19	Süper Lig	17	4	—		1	0	—		0	0	—		18	4
Istanbul Basaksehir	2019–20	Süper Lig	15	0	—		4	0	—		6 (Note: Appearances in UEFA Champions League and UEFA Europa League)	0	—		25	0
Istanbul Basaksehir	Total		32	4	—		5	0	—		6	0	—		43	4
Santos	2020	Série A	0	0	—		0	0	—		0	0	—		0	0
Career total			512	155	75	40	56	25	1	0	115	29	11	0	771	249

=== International ===
Appearances and goals by national team and year
National team	Year	Apps	Goals
Brazil
Brazil	2003	5	0
Brazil	2004	1	0
Brazil	2005	11	5
Brazil	2006	10	0
Brazil	2007	17	6
Brazil	2008	11	5
Brazil	2009	12	3
Brazil	2010	11	6
Brazil	2011	7	1
Brazil	2012	0	0
Brazil	2013	2	1
Brazil	2014	3	0
Brazil	2015	4	1
Brazil	2016	0	0
Brazil	2017	1	0
Total		100	28

Scores and results list Brazil's goal tally first

List of international goals scored by Robinho
No.	Date	Venue	Opponent	Score	Result	Competition
1	9 February 2005	Hong Kong Stadium, Wanchai, Hong Kong	Hong Kong	6–0	7–1	2005 Lunar New Year Cup
2	5 June 2005	Estádio Beira-Rio, Porto Alegre, Brazil	Paraguay	4–1	4–1	2006 FIFA World Cup qualification
3	16 June 2005	Red Bull Arena, Leipzig, Germany	Greece	2–0	3–0	2005 FIFA Confederations Cup
4	22 June 2005	RheinEnergieStadion, Cologne, Germany	Japan	1–0	2–2	2005 FIFA Confederations Cup
5	4 September 2005	Estádio Nacional Mané Garrincha, Brasília, Brazil	Chile	2–0	5–0	2006 FIFA World Cup qualification
6	1 July 2007	Estadio Monumental de Maturín, Maturín, Venezuela	Chile	1–0	3–0	2007 Copa América
7	1 July 2007	Estadio Monumental de Maturín, Maturín, Venezuela	Chile	2–0	3–0	2007 Copa América
8	1 July 2007	Estadio Monumental de Maturín, Maturín, Venezuela	Chile	3–0	3–0	2007 Copa América
9	4 July 2007	Estadio José Antonio Anzoátegui, Barcelona, Venezuela	Ecuador	1–0	1–0	2007 Copa América
10	7 July 2007	Estadio José Antonio Anzoátegui, Barcelona, Venezuela	Chile	3–0	6–1	2007 Copa América
11	7 July 2007	Estadio José Antonio Anzoátegui, Barcelona, Venezuela	Chile	4–0	6–1	2007 Copa América
12	6 February 2008	Croke Park, Dublin, Ireland	Republic of Ireland	1–0	1–0	Friendly
13	31 May 2008	CenturyLink Field, Seattle, United States	Canada	3–2	3–2	Friendly
14	7 September 2008	Estadio Nacional Julio Martínez Prádanos, Santiago, Chile	Chile	2–0	3–0	2010 FIFA World Cup qualification
15	12 October 2008	Estadio Polideportivo de Pueblo Nuevo, San Cristóbal, Venezuela	Venezuela	2–0	4–0	2010 FIFA World Cup qualification
16	12 October 2008	Estadio Polideportivo de Pueblo Nuevo, San Cristóbal, Venezuela	Venezuela	4–0	4–0	2010 FIFA World Cup qualification
17	10 February 2009	Emirates Stadium, London, England	Italy	2–0	2–0	Friendly
18	10 June 2009	Estádio do Arruda, Recife, Brazil	Paraguay	1–1	2–1	2010 FIFA World Cup qualification
19	18 June 2009	Loftus Versfeld Stadium, Pretoria, South Africa	United States	2–0	3–0	2009 FIFA Confederations Cup
20	2 March 2010	Emirates Stadium, London, England	Republic of Ireland	2–0	2–0	Friendly
21	2 June 2010	National Sports Stadium, Harare, Zimbabwe	Zimbabwe	2–0	3–0	Friendly
22	7 June 2010	National Stadium, Dar es Salaam, Tanzania	Tanzania	1–0	5–1	Friendly
23	7 June 2010	National Stadium, Dar es Salaam, Tanzania	Tanzania	2–0	5–1	Friendly
24	28 June 2010	Ellis Park Stadium, Johannesburg, South Africa	Chile	3–0	3–0	2010 FIFA World Cup
25	2 July 2010	Nelson Mandela Bay Stadium, Port Elizabeth, South Africa	Netherlands	1–0	1–2	2010 FIFA World Cup
26	10 August 2011	Mercedes-Benz Arena, Stuttgart, Germany	Germany	1–2	2–3	Friendly
27	19 November 2013	Rogers Centre, Toronto, Canada	Chile	2–1	2–1	Friendly
28	27 June 2015	Estadio Ester Roa, Concepción, Chile	Paraguay	1–0	1–1 (a.e.t.), (3–4 p)	2015 Copa América

== Honours ==
Santos

- Campeonato Brasileiro Série A: 2002, 2004
- Campeonato Paulista: 2010, 2015
- Copa do Brasil: 2010

Real Madrid

- La Liga: 2006–07, 2007–08
- Supercopa de España: 2008

AC Milan

- Serie A: 2010–11
- Supercoppa Italiana: 2011

Guangzhou Evergrande

- Chinese Super League: 2015

Atlético Mineiro

- Campeonato Mineiro: 2017

İstanbul Başakşehir

- Süper Lig: 2019–20

Brazil

- Copa América: 2007
- FIFA Confederations Cup: 2005, 2009

Individual

- South American Team of the Year: 2002, 2003, 2004
- Bola de Prata: 2002, 2004, 2016
- Bola de Ouro: 2004
- World Soccer Young Player of the Year: 2005
- Copa América Best Player: 2007
- Copa América Golden Boot: 2007
- Campeonato Paulista Team of the Year: 2015
- Campeonato Brasileiro Série A Team of the Year: 2016

== See also ==
- List of men's footballers with 100 or more international caps
