= Mahicon Librelato =

Brazilian footballer (1981-2002)

Personal information
- Full name: Mahicon José Librelato da Silva
- Date of birth: 30 March 1981
- Place of birth: Orleáns, Brazil
- Date of death: 28 November 2002 (aged 21)
- Place of death: Florianópolis, Brazil
- Height: 1.76 m (5 ft 9 in)
- Position: Forward

Youth career
- 1994–1996: Criciúma

Senior career*
Years	Team	Apps	(Gls)
1997–2001	Criciúma		
2001–2002	Internacional	22	(10)
- * Club domestic league appearances and goals

Mahicon José Librelato da Silva (March 30, 1981 – November 28, 2002) was a Brazilian footballer.

Mahicon died when his car crashed in Florianópolis, in 2002.

He was a rising star when playing for Internacional, and had an importance due to his goal scoring skills that helped Inter escape relegation in the 2002 edition of Campeonato Brasileiro, making colorados remember him fondly for his dedication and affection for the club.

== Career ==
- Criciúma: 1997 - 2001.
- Internacional: 2002.

== Team awards ==
- Rio Grande do Sul State Championship - 2002 - Internacional
