= Esquerdinha (footballer, born 1970) =

Brazilian footballer

Personal information
- Full name: Rogério Fonseca da Silva
- Date of birth: 24 March 1970 (age 56)
- Place of birth: Rio de Janeiro, Brazil
- Position: Midfielder

Senior career*
Years	Team	Apps	(Gls)
-1992	Barretos		
1993	Inter de Bebedouro		
1994	Rio Preto		
1995	Novorizontino		
1996	Matonense		
1997	Sampaio Corrêa		
1998	São Caetano		
1998	Juventus		
1999	Sampaio Corrêa		
2000-2002	São Caetano		
2002	Santos		
2002	Botafogo		
2003	Guarani		
2004	Atlético Sorocaba		
2005	Bandeirante		
2006	América de Rio Preto		
2006	Ceilândia		
2006	Bahia		
2007	Nacional		
2007	Toledo		
2008	CRAC		
2008	Fast Clube		
2009	Mesquita	1	(0)
2009	CSA		
2011	Mamoré		
2012	Luziânia		
2015	Barretos	8	(1)

International career
2002	Brazil	1	(0)
- * Club domestic league appearances and goals

Rogério Fonseca da Silva (born 24 March 1970 in Brazil) is a Brazilian retired footballer.

== Career ==
In 2001, Esquerdinha aimed to become the oldest player ever to retire in Brazil. He later aimed to play for 40 clubs in his career.

In 2002, Esquerdinha made his international debut in a friendly against Bolivia. In 2015, he said that people were suspicious of Sao Caetano, who were 2000 Brazilian league runners-up despite being in the second division, because of their fast rise which resulted in few of their players being called up.

After returning to Barretos in 2015, he was judged to be physically unwell and left out of the squad despite featuring in seven out of eight games in a row. As a result, he has complained that there was a prejudice of older players in Brazil.
