= Fabiano Souza =

Brazilian footballer

Personal information
- Full name: Luiz Fabiano de Souza
- Date of birth: 18 March 1975 (age 51)
- Place of birth: Rubim, Brazil
- Height: 1.79 m (5 ft 10 in)
- Position: Forward

Senior career*
Years	Team	Apps	(Gls)
1992–1993	Sertãozinho		
1994	XV de Jaú		
1995–1996	Juventus-SP		
1996–2000	Internacional		
2001	São Paulo	9	(1)
2001–2002	Internacional		
2002	Santos		
2003	Beitar Jerusalem		
2004	Marília		
2005	Olmedo		
2006	Ulbra		
2006	CRB		
2006	Gama		
2007	Al-Mesaimeer		
2008–2009	São José-RS		
2011	União Frederiquense		

International career
1995	Brazil U23	1	(0)
- * Club domestic league appearances and goals as of 30 August 2023

Luiz Fabiano de Souza (born 18 March 1975), also known as Fabiano Souza or simply Fabiano, is a Brazilian former professional footballer who played as a forward.

== Career ==
Fabiano started in professional football at the age of 17, playing for teams in the lower levels of São Paulo state league, until he reached SC Internacional, a team for which he became an idol due to the large number of goals scored in the Grenal.

At São Paulo FC, he started to be called Fabiano Souza, since the club already had two other players named Fabiano (Luís Fabiano and Fabiano). Fabiano also represented Brazil at the 1995 Pan American Games.

== Honours ==
=== Internacional ===
- Campeonato Gaúcho: 1997, 2002

=== São Paulo ===
- Torneio Rio-São Paulo: 2001

=== Santos ===
- Campeonato Brasileiro: 2002
