= Preto (footballer, born 1978) =

Brazilian footballer

Personal information
- Full name: Marcos Antônio Costa
- Date of birth: 18 December 1978 (age 47)
- Place of birth: São Luís, Brazil
- Height: 1.79 m (5 ft 10 in)
- Position: Centre-back

Youth career
- Santos

Senior career*
Years	Team	Apps	(Gls)
1999–2000	Juventus		
2000–2004	Santos		
2005	Guarani		
2005–2006	Ponte Preta		
2007	Ituano		
2008–2011	América Mineiro		
2012	Itumbiara		
2012	Sampaio Corrêa		
2013	Portuguesa Santista		
- * Club domestic league appearances and goals

Marcos Antônio Costa (born 18 December 1978), simply known as Preto, is a Brazilian former professional footballer who played as a centre-back.

== Honours ==
Santos

- Campeonato Brasileiro Série A: 2002, 2004
