= Alberto (footballer, born 1975) =

Brazilian footballer

Personal information
- Full name: Alberto Luiz de Souza
- Date of birth: April 27, 1975 (age 51)
- Place of birth: Campo Grande, Brazil
- Height: 1.83 m (6 ft 0 in)
- Position: Striker

Senior career*
Years	Team	Apps	(Gls)
1994	Ituano		
1995	Lousano Paulista		
1996–1997	Internacional		
1997	Atlante		
1998	Necaxa		
1999	Paulista		
2000	Palmeiras		
2001	Náutico		
2001	Botafogo-SP		
2002	Santos		
2003–2004	Dynamo Moscow		
2004–2005	Corinthians		
2005	Rostov		
2006	Atlético Mineiro		
2006	Coritiba		
2007	Ventforet Kofu.		
2008–2009	Grêmio Barueri		
2009	Ceará		
2009	Comercial		
2010	Catanduvense		
- * Club domestic league appearances and goals

Alberto Luiz de Souza or simply Alberto (born April 27, 1975) is a Brazilian former association football striker. He played for a number of Brazilian clubs as well as stints in Mexico, Russia and Japan. He won the 2002 Campeonato Brasileiro Série A with Santos.

== Club statistics ==
Club performance			League		Cup		League Cup		Total	
Season	Club	League	Apps	Goals	Apps	Goals	Apps	Goals	Apps	Goals
Brazil			League		Copa do Brasil		League Cup		Total	
2000	Palmeiras	Série A	9	0					9	0
2001	Náutico Capibaribe	Série B								
2001	Botafogo-SP	Série A								
2002	Santos	Série A	24	8					24	8
Russia			League		Russian Cup		Premier League Cup		Total	
2003	Dynamo Moscow	Premier League	18	2					18	2
2004	Dynamo Moscow	Premier League	4	0					4	0
Brazil			League		Copa do Brasil		League Cup		Total	
2004	Corinthians Paulista	Série A	13	1					13	1
2005	Corinthians Paulista	Série A	0	0					0	0
Russia			League		Russian Cup		Premier League Cup		Total	
2005	Rostov	Premier League	0	0					0	0
Brazil			League		Copa do Brasil		League Cup		Total	
2006	Atlético Mineiro	Série B	0	0					0	0
2006	Coritiba	Série B	15	4					15	4
Japan			League		Emperor's Cup		J.League Cup		Total	
2007	Ventforet Kofu	J1 League	15	3	1	0	2	1	18	4
Brazil			League		Copa do Brasil		League Cup		Total	
2008	Grêmio Recreativo Barueri	Série B								
Country	Brazil		51	13					51	13
Country	Russia		22	2					22	2
Country	Japan		15	3	1	0	2	1	18	4
Total			88	18	1	0	2	1	91	19
