= Michel (footballer, born November 1977) =

Brazilian footballer

Personal information
- Full name: Michel dos Reis Santana
- Date of birth: 18 November 1977 (age 48)
- Place of birth: São Paulo, Brazil
- Height: 1.74 m (5 ft 9 in)
- Positions: Right back; right wing back

Youth career
- 1995–1997: Santos

Senior career*
Years	Team	Apps	(Gls)
1995–2003	Santos		
1998	→ Francana (loan)		
2001	→ Vitória (loan)		
2003	Goiás		
2004	Grêmio	43	(0)
2005	São Paulo	7	(0)
2006	Portuguesa Santista		
2006–2007	Brasiliense		
2007	Vila Nova		
2008	Fortaleza		
2008–2009	Avaí		
2010	Anapolina		
2011	Sertãozinho		
2011	CRB		
2011	Taboão da Serra		
2012	Serrano-BA	0	(0)

International career
1999	Brazil U23	3	(0)
- * Club domestic league appearances and goals as of 20 October 2023

Michel dos Reis Santana (born 18 November 1977), simply known as Michel, is a Brazilian former professional footballer who played as a right back.

== Career ==
Revealed by Santos, he was part of the squad Brazilian champion in 2002, after received a doping suspension of 160 days for cannabis use during 2002 Torneio Rio-São Paulo. During 2004, Michel was released from Grêmio after escaping from the team's camp to drink with a friend. In 2005, he was hired by São Paulo to compete in the Copa Libertadores, where he also became champion.

In 2008 he was suspended again for using cannabis, this time at Fortaleza, and his contract was terminated as a result. He ended his career in 2012, after signing and not playing for Serrano.

== Honours ==
Santos

- Campeonato Brasileiro: 2002

São Paulo

- Copa Libertadores: 2005
