= Alex Alves (footballer, born 1981) =

Brazilian footballer

Personal information
- Full name: Alexandre Alves da Silva
- Date of birth: March 6, 1981 (age 45)
- Place of birth: Paranacity, Brazil
- Height: 1.75 m (5 ft 9 in)
- Position: Midfielder

Youth career
- 1999–2000: Guarani

Senior career*
| Years | Team | Apps | (Gls) |
| 2001 | Guarani | 12 | (0) |
| 2002–2003 | Santos | 34 | (0) |
| 2004 | KAMAZ | 0 | (0) |
| 2004 | Saturn | 3 | (0) |
| 2005 | Pontevedra | 18 | (1) |
| 2005–2007 | Lorca Deportiva | 34 | (5) |
| 2007–2008 | FC Vaduz | 23 | (0) |
| 2008–2009 | Ciudad de Lorca | 34 | (5) |
| 2009–2010 | Villarrobledo | | |
| 2010–2011 | Lorca Atlético | 29 | (0) |
- * Club domestic league appearances and goals

Alexandre Alves da Silva (born 6 March 1981) is a Brazilian former professional footballer who played as a midfielder.

He joined FC KAMAZ Naberezhnye Chelny in March 2004, and joined Saturn later in the same year.
