= Maurinho (footballer, born 1978) =

Brazilian footballer

Personal information
- Full name: Mauro Sérgio Viriato Mendes
- Date of birth: October 11, 1978 (age 48)
- Place of birth: Fernandópolis, Brazil
- Height: 1.75 m (5 ft 9 in)
- Positions: Right back; right winger

Youth career
- 1997: Fernandópolis
- 1997: Rio Preto
- 1998: Capivariano

Senior career*
Years	Team	Apps	(Gls)
1998–1999	Ituano		
1999	São Bento		
2000	Ituano		
2000	Sertãozinho		
2001–2002	Etti Jundiaí		
2002	→ Santos (loan)	22	(0)
2003–2006	Cruzeiro	72	(2)
2006–2007	São Paulo		
2007	→ Goiás (loan)	3	(0)
2008	Cruzeiro	4	(0)
2010	Pelotas		
2011	Uberaba		
2011	Grêmio Barueri		
2012	Fernandópolis		
2015	Fernandópolis		

International career
2003	Brazil	2	(0)
- * Club domestic league appearances and goals

Mauro Sérgio Viriato Mendes or simply Maurinho (born October 11, 1978, in Fernandópolis), is a Brazilian former professional football right back.

== Honours ==
=== Club ===
- Brazilian League (3rd division): 2001
- Brazilian League: 2002, 2003, 2006
- Minas Gerais State League: 2003, 2004
- Brazilian Cup: 2003

=== Individual ===
- Brazilian Bola de Prata (Placar): 2003
