= William (footballer, born 1983) =

Brazilian footballer

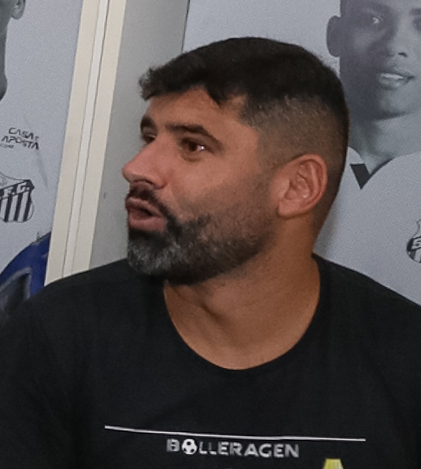
- William in 2020

Personal information
- Full name: William Júnior Salles de Lima Souza
- Date of birth: 14 May 1983 (age 43)
- Place of birth: Rolândia, Brazil
- Height: 1.85 m (6 ft 1 in)
- Position: Striker

Youth career
- 2000: Santo André

Senior career*
Years	Team	Apps	(Gls)
2001–2005	Santos	53	(16)
2004	→ Ulsan Hyundai (loan)	0	(0)
2006	Boavista	14	(3)
2006	Coritiba	15	(2)
2007	Busan IPark	2	(0)
2007	Fortaleza	14	(9)
2008	Guingamp	17	(1)
2008–2011	Avaí	81	(40)
2010	→ Grêmio (loan)	13	(2)
2010	→ Ponte Preta (loan)	25	(14)
2012	Atlético Goianiense	17	(3)
2012	Vitória	17	(8)
2013–2014	Ponte Preta	54	(27)
2014	→ Al-Khor (loan)	21	(12)
2015	Ceará	12	(3)
2015–2016	Avaí	45	(10)
2017	Água Santa	10	(4)
2017	Náutico	10	(5)
2018	Portuguesa	3	(0)
2020	Rio Branco-PR	6	(1)

International career
2003	Brazil U20	3	(1)
- * Club domestic league appearances and goals

William Júnior Salles de Lima Souza (born 14 May 1983), simply known as William, is a Brazilian former footballer who played as a striker.

== Career ==
His previous clubs include Santos, Ulsan Hyundai and Busan IPark in South Korea.

== Honours ==
Santos

- Campeonato Brasileiro Série A: 2004

Grêmio

- Campeonato Gaúcho: 2010

Ceará

- Copa do Nordeste: 2015
