= 1989 Santos FC season =

Santos
1989 season
- Manager: Raul Pratalli Nicanor de Carvalho Pepe
- Campeonato Brasileiro: 12th
- Campeonato Paulista: Second stage
- Supercopa Libertadores: First round
- Top goalscorer: League: Paulinho McLaren (7); All: Júnior (9)

The 1989 season was Santos FC's seventy-seventh season in existence and club's thirty in the top flight of Brazilian football since Brasileirão era.

== Players ==
=== Squad ===
Note: Flags indicate national team as defined under FIFA eligibility rules; some limited exceptions apply. Players may hold more than one non-FIFA nationality.

No.	Pos.	Nation	Player
—	GK	BRA	Ferreira
—	GK	BRA	Nilton
—	GK	BRA	Nilton Pellegrine
—	GK	BRA	Sérgio Guedes
—	DF	BRA	Camilo
—	DF	BRA	Cássio
—	DF	BRA	Davi
—	DF	BRA	Ditinho
—	DF	BRA	Éder José
—	DF	BRA	Luiz Carlos
—	DF	BRA	Luizinho
—	DF	BRA	Pedro Paulo
—	DF	BRA	Wladimir
—	MF	BRA	Axel
—	MF	BRA	César Ferreira

No.	Pos.	Nation	Player
—	MF	BRA	César Sampaio
—	MF	BRA	Ernani
—	MF	BRA	Heriberto
—	MF	BRA	Jorginho Putinatti
—	MF	BRA	Sérgio Manoel
—	MF	BRA	Marco Antônio Cipó
—	FW	BRA	Carlinhos
—	FW	BRA	Essinho
—	FW	BRA	Juary
—	FW	BRA	Paulinho McLaren
—	FW	BRA	Roberto Cearense
—	FW	BRA	Serginho Chulapa
—	FW	BRA	Totonho
—	FW	BRA	Tuíco

Source: Acervo Santista

==== Appearances and goals ====
Pos.	Nat	Name	Brasileiro		Paulista		Supercopa		Total	
Pos.	Nat	Name	Apps	Goals	Apps	Goals	Apps	Goals	Apps	Goals
GK	(Brazil)	Ferreira	0	0	5	0	0	0	5	0
GK	(Brazil)	Nilton Pellegrine	0	0	0 (1)	0	0	0	1	0
GK	(Brazil)	Sérgio Guedes	17	0	20	0	2	0	39	0
DF	(Brazil)	Camilo	4	0	0	0	0	0	4	0
DF	(Brazil)	Careca	0	0	0 (1)	0	0	0	1	0
DF	(Brazil)	Cássio	1	0	9 (1)	0	0 (1)	0	12	0
DF	(Brazil)	Davi	9	0	15	1	2	0	26	1
DF	(Brazil)	Ditinho	16	0	0	0	2	1	18	1
DF	(Brazil)	Heraldo	0	0	24	0	0	0	24	0
DF	(Brazil)	Luiz Carlos	13	0	19	0	2	0	34	0
DF	(Brazil)	Luizinho	4	0	9	0	0	0	13	0
DF	(Brazil)	Nildo	0	0	3	0	0	0	3	0
DF	(Brazil)	Pedro Paulo	5	0	0	0	0	0	5	0
DF	(Brazil)	Wladimir	16	0	24	1	2	0	42	1
MF	(Brazil)	Axel	5	0	2 (1)	0	0	0	8	0
MF	(Brazil)	César Ferreira	13 (2)	0	21 (1)	1	2	0	39	1
MF	(Uruguay)	César Pereyra	0	0	2 (3)	0	0	0	5	0
MF	(Brazil)	César Sampaio	16	0	22	0	2	0	40	0
MF	(Brazil)	Ernani	7	2	0	0	2	0	9	2
MF	(Brazil)	Heriberto	9	0	0	0	1	0	10	0
MF	(Brazil)	Jorginho Putinatti	9 (1)	1	0	0	2	0	12	1
MF	(Brazil)	Júnior	0	0	24	9	0	0	24	9
MF	(Brazil)	Luiz Cláudio	0	0	0 (2)	0	0	0	2	0
MF	(Brazil)	Marco Antônio Cipó	0	0	7 (1)	1	0	0	8	1
MF	(Brazil)	Sérgio Manoel	1	0	0	0	0	0	1	0
MF	(Brazil)	Sócrates	0	0	20	5	0	0	20	5
FW	(Brazil)	Aluísio Guerreiro	0	0	6	0	0	0	6	0
FW	(Brazil)	Carlinhos	6 (5)	1	0	0	1	0	12	1
FW	(Uruguay)	Carlos Miraglia	0	0	3 (3)	0	0	0	6	0
FW	(Brazil)	Edilson	0	0	4 (5)	0	0	0	9	0
FW	(Brazil)	Essinho	0 (1)	0	0 (2)	0	0	0	3	0
FW	(Brazil)	Juary	4 (2)	0	8 (1)	1	0 (1)	0	16	1
FW	(Brazil)	Leonardo Manzi	0	0	4 (4)	0	0	0	8	0
FW	(Brazil)	Paulinho McLaren	13	7	0	0	1	0	14	7
FW	(Brazil)	Serginho Chulapa	5	1	0	0	0	0	5	1
FW	(Brazil)	Totonho	7 (5)	0	4 (5)	0	0	0	21	0
FW	(Brazil)	Tuíco	7 (6)	0	20	1	1	0	34	1

Source: Match reports in Competitive matches

==== Goalscorers ====
Ran	Pos	Nat	Name	Brasileiro	Paulistão	Supercopa	Total
1	MF	(Brazil)	Júnior	0	9	0	9
2	FW	(Brazil)	Paulinho McLaren	7	0	0	7
3	MF	(Brazil)	Sócrates	0	5	0	5
4	MF	(Brazil)	Ernani	2	0	0	2
5	FW	(Brazil)	Carlinhos	1	0	0	1
5	MF	(Brazil)	César Ferreira	0	1	0	1
5	DF	(Brazil)	Davi	0	1	0	1
5	DF	(Brazil)	Ditinho	0	0	1	1
5	MF	(Brazil)	Jorginho Putinatti	1	0	0	1
5	FW	(Brazil)	Juary	0	1	0	1
5	MF	(Brazil)	Marco Antônio Cipó	0	1	0	1
5	FW	(Brazil)	Serginho Chulapa	1	0	0	1
5	FW	(Brazil)	Tuíco	0	1	0	1
5	DF	(Brazil)	Wladimir	0	1	0	1

== Transfers ==
=== In ===
Pos.	Name	Moving to	Source	Notes
MF	(Brazil) Axel	Youth system		
FW	(Uruguay) Carlos Miraglia	Sud América (Uruguay)		On loan
LB	(Brazil) Wladimir	Cruzeiro		
FW	(Brazil) Aluísio Guerreiro	Free agent		
MF	(Brazil) Luiz Cláudio	Youth system		
GK	(Brazil) Sérgio Guedes	Ponte Preta		
FW	(Brazil) Edilson	Umuarama		
FW	(Brazil) Totonho	Portuguesa Santista		
FW	(Brazil) Juary	Boavista (Portugal)		
FW	(Brazil) Roberto Cearense	Catanduvense		
MF	(Brazil) Ernani	Vasco da Gama		
FW	(Brazil) Carlinhos	XV de Piracicaba		
RB	(Brazil) Ditinho	Guarani		
FW	(Brazil) Essinho	Palmeirense		Loan return
MF	(Brazil) Heriberto	Cruzeiro		
FW	(Brazil) Paulinho McLaren	Figueirense		
MF	(Brazil) Jorginho Putinatti	Grêmio		
FW	(Brazil) Serginho Chulapa	Jabaquara		Loan return
DF	(Brazil) Pedro Paulo	Catanduvense		Loan return
DF	(Brazil) Camilo	Youth system		
MF	(Brazil) Sérgio Manoel	Youth system		

=== Out ===
Pos.	Name	Moving to	Source	Notes
FW	(Brazil) Giba	Marília		Loan return
DF	(Brazil) Lula Paulista	Flamengo		Loan return
FW	(Brazil) Zimmermann	Lençoense		Loan return
MF	(Japan) Musashi Mizushima	São Paulo		Loan return
FW	(Brazil) Miltinho	Portuguesa Santista		Loan return
LB	(Brazil) Ademir	Umuarama		On loan
RB	(Brazil) Amaury	Umuarama		On loan
FW	(Brazil) Paulo Leme	Umuarama		On loan
FW	(Brazil) Luis Carlos Borges	Umuarama		On loan
RB	(Brazil) Ijuí	Catanduvense		On loan
LB	(Brazil) Flavinho	Catanduvense		On loan
DF	(Brazil) Pedro Paulo	Catanduvense		On loan
GK	(Brazil) Raul	Catanduvense		On loan
FW	(Brazil) Hélio	Novorizontino		Loan return
MF	(Brazil) Mendonça	Al Sadd (Qatar)		
FW	(Brazil) Leandro	Fabril		Loan return
FW	(Brazil) Aluísio Guerreiro	Free agent		
DF	(Brazil) Nildo	Free agent		
FW	(Brazil) Essinho	Palmeirense		On loan
FW	(Brazil) Leonardo Manzi	Free agent		
MF	(Uruguay) César Pereyra	Free agent		
FW	(Uruguay) Carlos Miraglia	Free agent		
FW	(Brazil) Edilson	Santo André		
RB	(Brazil) Ijuí	Botafogo–SP		On loan
MF	(Brazil) Júnior	Necaxa (Mexico)		
LB	(Brazil) Éder	Free agent		
RB	(Brazil) Heraldo	Grêmio		On loan
MF	(Brazil) Sócrates	Botafogo–SP		
FW	(Brazil) Sidney	Atlético Goianiense		On loan
MF	(Brazil) Ernani	Ponte Preta		On loan

== Friendlies ==
29 January Friendly	Apucarana	2 – 3	Santos	Apucarana
	Carlos Alberto 81'; Ricardo 90' (pen.)	Report	9' Cássio; 53' Tuíco; 85' César Ferreira	Stadium: Bom Jesus da Lapa; Attendance: 9,000; Referee: Edson Romero

1 February Friendly	Umuarama	1 – 1	Santos	Umuarama
	Geronil 60'	Report	Sócrates	Stadium: Lúcio Pipino; Attendance: 10,000; Referee: Dirceu Oscar de Matos

7 February Friendly	Fernández Vial (Chile)	1 – 1	(Brazil) Santos	Concepción, Chile
	Hernán Sáez 88'	Report	35' Heraldo	Stadium: Ester Roa; Attendance: 5,845; Referee: Carlos Cáceres

9 February Friendly	Deportes Concepción (Chile)	0 – 1	(Brazil) Santos	Concepción, Chile
		Report	25' Heraldo	Stadium: Ester Roa; Attendance: 7,180; Referee: Héctor Poblete

11 February Friendly	Everton (Chile)	1 – 0	(Brazil) Santos	Viña del Mar, Chile
	Carlos Rosa 11'	Report		Stadium: Sausalito; Attendance: 4,089; Referee: Carlos Robles

23 February Friendly	Atlético Mineiro	2 – 1	(Brazil) Santos	Belo Horizonte
	Paulo Roberto 46'; Renato 58'	Report	78' (pen.) Júnior	Stadium: Mineirão; Attendance: 7,054; Referee: Márcio Rezende de Freitas

11 April Friendly	Grêmio Maringá	0 – 1	Santos	Maringá
		Report	78' Sócrates	Stadium: Willie Davids; Attendance: 3,736; Referee: Dirceu Oscar de Matos

16 April Friendly	Jamaica	1 – 1	(Brazil) Santos	Kingston, Jamaica
	Peter Isaacs	Report	49' Sócrates	Stadium: Independence Park; Attendance: 30,000; Referee: Winston Campbell

17 April Friendly	Cayman Islands	0 – 2	(Brazil) Santos	Grand Cayman, Cayman Islands
		Report	41' Júnior; 68' (pen.) César Ferreira	Attendance: 2,000; Referee: John Oliver

3 July Friendly	Atlética Iguaçu	1 – 1	Santos	União da Vitória
	Eupídio 55'	Report	49' Luizinho	Stadium: Antiocho Pereira; Attendance: 1,927; Referee: Celso Sampaio

5 July Friendly	Guaycurus	0 – 4	Santos	Concórdia
		Report	(o.g.) Newton; Juary; Roberto Cearense	Stadium: Domingos Machado de Lima; Attendance: 2,500; Referee: Júlio Rascaf

6 July Friendly	Joaçaba	0 – 4	Santos	Joaçaba
		Report	21' Juary; 30' (o.g.) César; 64' (pen.) César Ferreira; 66' César Sampaio	Stadium: Oscar Rodrigues da Nova; Attendance: 3,126; Referee: Luiz Carlos dos Santos

7 July Friendly	Videira football team	0 – 4	Santos	Videira
		Report	18' Juary; 34' (o.g.) Melão; 79' Roberto Cearense; 90' (pen.) César Sampaio	Stadium: Luiz Leoni; Attendance: 3,000; Referee: Antônio Carlos Ceron

16 July Friendly	Santos	1 – 0	Portuguesa	Santos
	Totonho 68'	Report		Stadium: Vila Belmiro; Attendance: 1,066; Referee: Aldo Ferreira Vaz

6 August Friendly	Tianjin football team (China)	1 – 4	(Brazil) Santos	Tianjin, China
	Zhang Yue 68'	Report	53', 86' Sócrates; 64', 77' Juary	Stadium: Minyuan Stadium; Attendance: 25,000; Referee: Wang Zhue Zhi

9 August Friendly	China U23	0 – 1	(Brazil) Santos	Beijing, China
		Report	62' Ernani	Stadium: Xiannongtan Stadium; Attendance: 30,000; Referee: Yang Limin

12 August Friendly	China	1 – 1	(Brazil) Santos	Dalian, China
	Ma Lin 9'	Report	50' (pen.) Sócrates	Stadium: Dalian People's Stadium; Attendance: 30,000; Referee: Liu Jin Li

15 August Friendly	Shenyang Liaoning (China)	0 – 1	(Brazil) Santos	Shenyang, China
		Report	23' Juary	Stadium: Wulihe Stadium; Attendance: 40,000; Referee: Wang Yong Qiun

18 August Friendly	Shanghai football team (China)	0 – 2	(Brazil) Santos	Shanghai, China
		Report	10' Heriberto; 50' Juary	Stadium: Hongkou Football Stadium; Attendance: 20,000; Referee: Li Zhi Fu

21 August Friendly	Hubei football team (China)	1 – 2	(Brazil) Santos	Wuhan, China
	Lui Wu Yi 55'	Report	70' Heriberto; 77' Ditinho	Stadium: Wuhan Municipal Stadium; Attendance: 30,000; Referee: Zhou Zhai Liang

24 August Friendly	Guangdong football team (China)	2 – 1	(Brazil) Santos	Guangzhou, China
	Chen Haixian 51', 54'	Report	37' César Sampaio	Stadium: Tianhe Stadium; Attendance: 45,000; Referee: Zhong Pe Hong

27 August Friendly	Double Flower FA (Hong Kong)	0 – 2	(Brazil) Santos	Hong Kong
		Report	51' Marco Antônio Cipó; 64' Roberto Cearense	Stadium: Hong Kong Stadium; Attendance: 8,145; Referee: Samuel Y. Chian

29 August Friendly	Foshan football team (China)	0 – 4	(Brazil) Santos	Foshan, China
		Report	19' Totonho; 24' (o.g.) Li Ruxin; 53' Luizinho; 75' Ditinho	Stadium: Nanhai District Stadium; Attendance: 15,000; Referee: Cheng Ming Ge

1 September Friendly	Boston Bolts (United States)	0 – 1	(Brazil) Santos	Boston, United States
		Report	Heriberto	Stadium: Nickerson Field; Attendance: 5,000; Referee: Charlie Van Nederly

2 September Friendly	Alianza (El Salvador)	1 – 1	(Brazil) Santos	Washington, United States
	Raúl Toro	Report	Juary	Stadium: Robert F. Kennedy Memorial Stadium; Attendance: 5,000; Referee: Tony Mazzeo

== Competitions ==
=== Campeonato Brasileiro ===
==== Results summary ====
Overall								Home						Away					
Pld	W	D	L	GF	GA	GAv	Pts	W	D	L	GF	GA	Pts	W	D	L	GF	GA	Pts
18	5	6	7	13	16	0.813	16	4	2	3	11	8	10	1	4	4	2	8	6

==== First stage ====
Group B
Pos	Team	Pld	W	D	L	GF	GA	GD	Pts	Qualification
6	Fluminense	10	4	2	4	9	10	−1	10	Second Stage
7	Cruzeiro	10	3	4	3	8	8	0	10	Second Stage
8	Santos	10	2	5	3	6	7	−1	9	Second Stage
9	Sport	10	3	2	5	9	12	−3	8	Relegation Tournament
10	Bahia	10	1	3	6	9	17	−8	5	Relegation Tournament

===== Matches =====
7 September 1	Palmeiras	0 – 0	Santos	São Paulo
16:00		Report		Stadium: Morumbi; Attendance: 11,924; Referee: Wilson Carlos dos Santos

9 September 2	Santos	0 – 1	Fluminense	Santos
16:00		Report	20' Marcelo Henrique	Stadium: Vila Belmiro; Attendance: 6,446; Referee: Ivo Scatola

17 September 3	Santos	1 – 2	Vasco da Gama	Santos
17:00	Ernani 19'	Report	30' Bebeto; 51' Marco Antônio Boiadeiro	Stadium: Vila Belmiro; Attendance: 15,147; Referee: Márcio Rezende de Freitas

20 September 4	Santos	0 – 0	Goiás	Santos
21:30		Report		Stadium: Vila Belmiro; Attendance: 4,311; Referee: Manoel Serapião Filho

24 September 5	Grêmio	0 – 0	Santos	Porto Alegre
21:30		Report		Stadium: Olímpico; Attendance: 10,900; Referee: Tito Rodrigues

27 September 6	Santos	3 – 1	Bahia	Santos
21:30	Paulinho McLaren 11', 79'; Ernani 34'	Report	60' Ronaldo	Stadium: Vila Belmiro; Attendance: 2,108; Referee: Carlos César Rosa Martins

30 September 7	Sport Recife	2 – 0	Santos	Recife
16:00	Dinho 52'; Marcus Vinícius 70'	Report		Stadium: Ilha do Retiro; Attendance: 5,646; Referee: Wilson Carlos dos Santos

8 October 8	Santos	1 – 1	Portuguesa	Santos
17:00	Carlinhos 46'	Report	32' Jorginho	Stadium: Vila Belmiro; Attendance: 8,106; Referee: Ílton José da Costa

15 October 9	Cruzeiro	0 – 0	Santos	Belo Horizonte
17:00		Report		Stadium: Mineirão; Attendance: 21,749; Referee: Gilson Ramos Cordeiro

22 October 10	Coritiba	0 – 1 (w/o)	Santos	Juiz de Fora
16:00		Report		Stadium: Mário Helênio; Referee: Manoel Serapião Filho

==== Second stage ====
Group B
Pos	Team	Pld	W	D	L	GF	GA	GD	Pts
4	Portuguesa	18	7	6	5	21	13	+8	20
5	Goiás	18	6	6	6	17	21	−4	18
6	Grêmio	18	6	5	7	19	19	0	17
7	Santos	18	5	6	7	13	16	−3	16
8	Fluminense	18	5	4	9	15	25	−10	14

===== Matches =====
29 October 11	Corinthians	0 – 0	Santos	São Paulo
17:00		Report		Stadium: Morumbi; Attendance: 30,331; Referee: Luiz Carlos Martins

5 November 12	Santos	2 – 1	Internacional	Santos
17:00	Jorginho Putinatti 24'; Paulinho McLaren 65'	Report	30' Zé Carlos	Stadium: Vila Belmiro; Attendance: 8,883; Referee: Manoel Serapião Filho

11 November 13	São Paulo	3 – 0	Santos	São Paulo
16:00	Ney Bala 5'; Edivaldo 25'; Flávio 86'	Report		Stadium: Morumbi; Attendance: 13,180; Referee: Edmundo Lima Filho

18 November 14	Flamengo	1 – 0	Santos	Rio de Janeiro
16:00	Luiz Carlos 36' (o.g.)	Report		Stadium: Maracanã; Attendance: 23,127; Referee: Gilson Ramos Cordeiro

26 November 15	Santos	2 – 0	Inter de Limeira	Santos
17:00	Paulinho McLaren 27', 69'	Report		Stadium: Vila Belmiro; Attendance: 2,450; Referee: Osvaldo dos Santos Ramos

29 November 16	Santos	2 – 1	Náutico	Santos
21:30	Serginho Chulapa 4'; Paulinho McLaren 69'	Report	12' Nivaldo	Stadium: Vila Belmiro; Attendance: 2,010; Referee: Alvimar Gaspar dos Reis

3 December 17	Atlético Mineiro	2 – 1	Santos	Belo Horizonte
17:00	Aílton 19'; Paulo Roberto 56'	Report	73' Paulinho McLaren	Stadium: Mineirão; Attendance: 7,078; Referee: Carlos Sérgio Rosa Martins

10 December 18	Santos	0 – 1	Botafogo	Santos
17:00		Report	30' Paulinho Criciúma	Stadium: Vila Belmiro; Attendance: 4,422; Referee: Renato Marsiglia

=== Campeonato Paulista ===
==== Results summary ====
Overall								Home						Away					
Pld	W	D	L	GF	GA	GAv	Pts	W	D	L	GF	GA	Pts	W	D	L	GF	GA	Pts
25	7	14	4	20	16	1.25	26	6	4	2	13	8	16	1	10	2	7	8	12

==== First stage ====
Pos	Team	Pld	W	PW	D	PL	L	GF	GA	GD	Pts	Qualification or relegation
6	Corinthians	21	10	2	3	0	6	27	17	+10	28	Qualified
7	Bragantino	21	10	1	4	0	6	18	15	+3	25	Qualified
8	Santos	21	6	5	4	3	3	17	12	+5	22	Qualified
9	Santo André	21	6	2	3	3	7	14	24	−10	17	
10	Juventus	21	3	2	4	0	12	16	31	−15	13	

Updated to match(es) played on May 28, 1989. Source: RSSSF.com
Rules for classification: 1) points; 2) head-to-head points; 3) wins; 4) goal difference; 5) number of goals scored.

===== Matches =====
18 February 1	Botafogo–SP	1 – 1	Santos	Ribeirão Preto
18:00	Edu 37'	Report	31' Júnior	Stadium: Santa Cruz; Attendance: 7,274; Referee: David Sidney Aveiro

26 February 2	Santos	1 – 2	Catanduvense	Santos
16:00	Sócrates 32'	Report	46' Paulo Sergio; 77' Márcio	Stadium: Vila Belmiro; Attendance: 4,157; Referee: Joel Teixeira Caires

1 March 3	Novorizontino	2 – 1	Santos	Novo Horizonte
16:00	Flávio 27'; Fabinho 59'	Report	17' César Ferreira	Stadium: Jorge Ismael de Biasi; Attendance: 4,394; Referee: Antônio de Pádua Salles

5 March 4	Santos	1 – 1	Inter de Limeira	Santos
16:00	Júnior 28'	Report	54' Gilcimar	Stadium: Vila Belmiro; Attendance: 3,196; Referee: José de Assis Aragão

9 March 5	Santos	1 – 0	Ferroviária	Santos
21:00	Júnior 40'	Report		Stadium: Vila Belmiro; Attendance: 1,030; Referee: Osvaldo dos Santos Ramos

22 March 6	XV de Jaú	0 – 0 (5–4 p)	Santos	Jaú
21:00		Report		Stadium: Zezinho Magalhães; Attendance: 3,250; Referee: João Leopoldo Ayeta
	Penalties
	Antônio Carlos (penalty scored); Nívio (penalty scored); Adriano (penalty scored); Élcio (penalty missed); Tetila (penalty missed); Jorge (penalty scored); Edinho (penalty scored)		(penalty scored) César Sampaio; (penalty scored) César Ferreira; (penalty scored) Júnior; (penalty missed) Heraldo; (penalty missed) César Pereyra; (penalty scored) Tuíco; (penalty missed) Wladimir

26 March 7	Mogi Mirim	0 – 0 (3–5 p)	Santos	Mogi Mirim
16:00		Report		Stadium: Vail Chaves; Attendance: 6,098; Referee: José Renato de Oliveira Fidalgo
	Penalties
	Soares (penalty missed); Carlão (penalty scored); Nildo (penalty scored); Valmir (penalty scored)		(penalty scored) Heraldo; (penalty scored) César Pereyra; (penalty scored) Tuíco; (penalty scored) César Ferreira; (penalty scored) Júnior

29 March 8	Noroeste	2 – 1	Santos	Bauru
21:00	Ronaldo Marques 34'; André 75'	Report	58' Júnior	Stadium: Alfredo de Castilho; Attendance: 4,925; Referee: Luiz Carlos Antunes

2 April 9	Santos	3 – 0	América–SP	Santos
16:00	Davi 25'; Sócrates 36'; Júnior 40'	Report		Stadium: Vila Belmiro; Attendance: 3,266; Referee: Almir Peixoto Laguna

5 April 10	Santos	0 – 0 (4–3 p)	XV de Piracicaba	Santos
21:00		Report		Stadium: Vila Belmiro; Attendance: 5,320; Referee: Valter Francisco dos Santos
	Penalties
	César Ferreira (penalty scored); Tuíco (penalty missed); César Sampaio (penalty scored); Júnior (penalty scored); Sócrates (penalty scored)		(penalty scored) Carlinhos; (penalty scored) Ramon; (penalty scored) Marquinhos Capivara; (penalty missed) Douglas; (penalty missed) Airton Caixão

9 April 11	União São João	0 – 0 (1–3 p)	Santos	Araras
15:30		Report		Stadium: Hermínio Ometto; Attendance: 7,210; Referee: Dulcídio Wanderley Boschilia
	Penalties
	Giba (penalty scored); Kel (penalty missed); Celso Luiz (penalty missed); Djalma (penalty missed)		(penalty scored) César Ferreira; (penalty scored) César Sampaio; (penalty scored) Heraldo

20 April 12	Santos	1 – 0	Bragantino	Santos
21:30	Marco Antônio Cipó 53'	Report		Stadium: Vila Belmiro; Attendance: 2,300; Referee: Luis Carlos Antunes

24 April 13	São José	1 – 1	Santos	São José dos Campos
21300	Henrique 3'	Report	73' Wladimir	Stadium: Martins Pereira; Attendance: 11,858; Referee: Almir Laguna

27 April 14	Guarani	0 – 0 (3–5 p)	Santos	Campinas
21:30		Report		Stadium: Brinco de Ouro; Attendance: 8,873; Referee: João Leopoldo Ayeta
	Penalties
	Pereira (penalty scored); Jorginho (penalty scored); Charles Guerreiro (penalty scored); Tato (penalty missed)		(penalty scored) César Sampaio; (penalty scored) Heraldo; (penalty scored) Luiz Carlos; (penalty scored) Júnior; (penalty scored) Sócrates

30 April 15	Santos	0 – 0 (4–5 p)	Santo André	Santos
16:00		Report		Stadium: Vila Belmiro; Attendance: 8,766; Referee: Antônio de Pádua Salles
	Penalties
	César Ferreira (penalty missed); Heraldo (penalty scored); Luiz Carlos (penalty scored); Júnior (penalty missed); Sócrates (penalty scored); Carlos Miraglia (penalty scored); Edílson (penalty missed)		(penalty scored) Edelvan; (penalty scored) Carlão; (penalty scored) Edmílson; (penalty missed) Beto Andrade; (penalty missed) Tonho; (penalty scored) Servilho; (penalty scored) Miltinho

6 May 16	Palmeiras	1 – 1	Santos	São Paulo
16:00	Gaúcho 51'	Report	2' Tuíco	Stadium: Morumbi; Attendance: 29,932; Referee: Arnaldo César Coelho

11 May 17	Santos	0 – 0 (4–5 p)	Corinthians	São Paulo
21:30		Report		Stadium: Pacaembu; Attendance: 22,261; Referee: Flávio de Carvalho
	Penalties
	César Ferreira (penalty scored); Luiz Carlos (penalty scored); Júnior (penalty scored); Sócrates (penalty scored); Heraldo (penalty missed); Luizinho (penalty missed); Cássio (penalty missed)		(penalty scored) Wilson Mano; (penalty scored) Ribamar; (penalty scored) Barbieri; (penalty scored) Dida; (penalty missed) Cláudio Adão; (penalty missed) Dama; (penalty scored) Paulo Sérgio

14 May 18	São Bento	0 – 0 (3–4 p)	Santos	Sorocaba
16:00		Report		Stadium: Walter Ribeiro; Attendance: 6,906; Referee: Ulisses Tavares da Silva
	Penalties
	Tupãzinho (penalty scored); Jorge (penalty scored); Andrade (penalty scored); Henrique (penalty missed); Pirula (penalty missed)		(penalty missed) Carlos Miraglia; (penalty scored) César Sampaio; (penalty scored) Luiz Carlos; (penalty scored) Júnior; (penalty scored) Sócrates

18 May 19	Santos	2 – 1	São Paulo	São Paulo
21:30	Júnior 27'; Sócrates 54' (pen.)	Report	67' (pen.) Paulo César	Stadium: Pacaembu; Attendance: 9,278; Referee: Dagoberto Teixeira

21 May 20	Portuguesa	0 – 1	Santos	São Paulo
16:00		Report	71' (pen.) Sócrates	Stadium: Canindé; Attendance: 20,192; Referee: Luiz Carlos Antunes

28 May 21	Santos	2 – 1	Juventus	Santos
16:00	Júnior 51', 69'	Report	88' Carlão	Stadium: Vila Belmiro; Attendance: 9,597; Referee: Modesto Salviatto Filho

==== Second stage ====
Pos	Team	Pld	W	D	L	GF	GA	GD	Pts	Qualification or relegation
1	Corinthians	4	3	1	0	7	2	+5	7	Qualified
2	Santos	4	1	2	1	3	4	−1	4	
3	Mogi Mirim	4	0	1	3	2	6	−4	1	

Updated to match(es) played on June 18, 1989. Source: RSSSF.com
Rules for classification: 1) points; 2) wins; 3) goal difference; 4) Best season record

===== Matches =====
31 May 1	Santos	1 – 0	Mogi Mirim	Santos
21:30	Juary 30'	Report		Stadium: Vila Belmiro; Attendance: 7,494; Referee: José Renato Fidalgo

4 June 2	Corinthians	0 – 0	Santos	São Paulo
16:00		Report		Stadium: Morumbi; Attendance: 31,391; Referee: José Roberto Wright

15 June 3	Mogi Mirim	1 – 1	Santos	Mogi Mirim
16:00	César 89'	Report	35' (pen.) Sócrates	Stadium: Vail Chaves; Attendance: 3,468; Referee: Edmundo Lima Filho

18 June 4	Santos	1 – 3	Corinthians	São Paulo
16:00	Júnior 90' (pen.)	Report	14' Ribamar; 77' Mauro; 83' Cláudio Adão	Stadium: Morumbi; Attendance: 43,565; Referee: Ílton José da Costa

=== Supercopa Libertadores ===
==== First round ====
4 October First leg	Santos (Brazil)	1 – 2	(Argentina) Independiente	Santos
22:00	Ditinho 85'	Report	11' Alfaro Moreno; 37' Insúa	Stadium: Vila Belmiro; Attendance: 2,176; Referee: Ernesto Fillippi

11 October Second leg	Independiente (Argentina)	2 – 0 (4–1 agg.)	(Brazil) Santos	Buenos Aires
22:00	Insúa 16'; Pedro Monzón 63'	Report		Stadium: La Doble Visera; Attendance: 40,000; Referee: Elias Jacome
