= Tostão (footballer, born 1957) =

Brazilian footballer

Personal information
- Full name: Luís Antônio Fernandes
- Date of birth: 6 November 1957 (age 68)
- Place of birth: Santos, Brazil
- Position: Midfielder

Senior career*
Years	Team	Apps	(Gls)
1975–1976	Santos		
1976–1977	Catanduvense		
1978–1979	Goiás		
1979	Atlético Goianiense		
1980–1982	Mixto		
1982–1985	Cruzeiro	213	(97)
1986–1992	Coritiba		
1988	→ Inter de Limeira (loan)		
1991	→ XV de Piracicaba (loan)		
1992	Atlético Paranaense		
1993	Caldense		
1994	Inter de Lages		
1994–1995	Rio Branco-PR		
1996	Vila Heuer-PR		
1996	Foz do Iguaçu EC		
1999	Rio Branco-PR		
- * Club domestic league appearances and goals as of 23 February 2024

Luís Antônio Fernandes (born 6 November 1957), also known as Tostão, Tostão II or Fernandes, is a Brazilian former professional footballer who played as a midfielder.

== Career ==
He started his career at Santos FC, and received the nickname Tostão from none other than Pelé and Zito, who found Fernandes' style similar to that of the national team and Cruzeiro star. He played for Catanduvense and then went to Goiás and later to Mixto, a club where he shined, being state champion three times, and playing outstanding matches in the Brazilian Championship, such as against Cruzeiro itself. The nickname had weight, and the original Tostão team signed Fernandes, who did not disappoint and even though he was a midfielder, he was top scorer in the Minas Gerais championship in 1982 and 1983, and champion in 1984, accumulating great performances against rival Atlético Mineiro.

In 1986 he arrived at Coritiba, and again achieved great success, becoming champion in 1986 and 1989 and joining the club's gallery of idols. Tostão ended his career in 1999 at Rio Branco SC de Paranaguá at the age of 39. He was honored by the municipal council of Curitiba due to the services provided to Coritiba FBC.

== Honours ==
Mixto

- Campeonato Mato-Grossense: 1980, 1981, 1982

Cruzeiro

- Campeonato Mineiro: 1984

Coritiba

- Campeonato Paranaense: 1986, 1989

Individual

- 1982 Campeonato Mineiro top scorer: 17 goals
- 1983 Campeonato Mineiro top scorer: 13 goals
