= Ilha do Mel =

Brazilian island

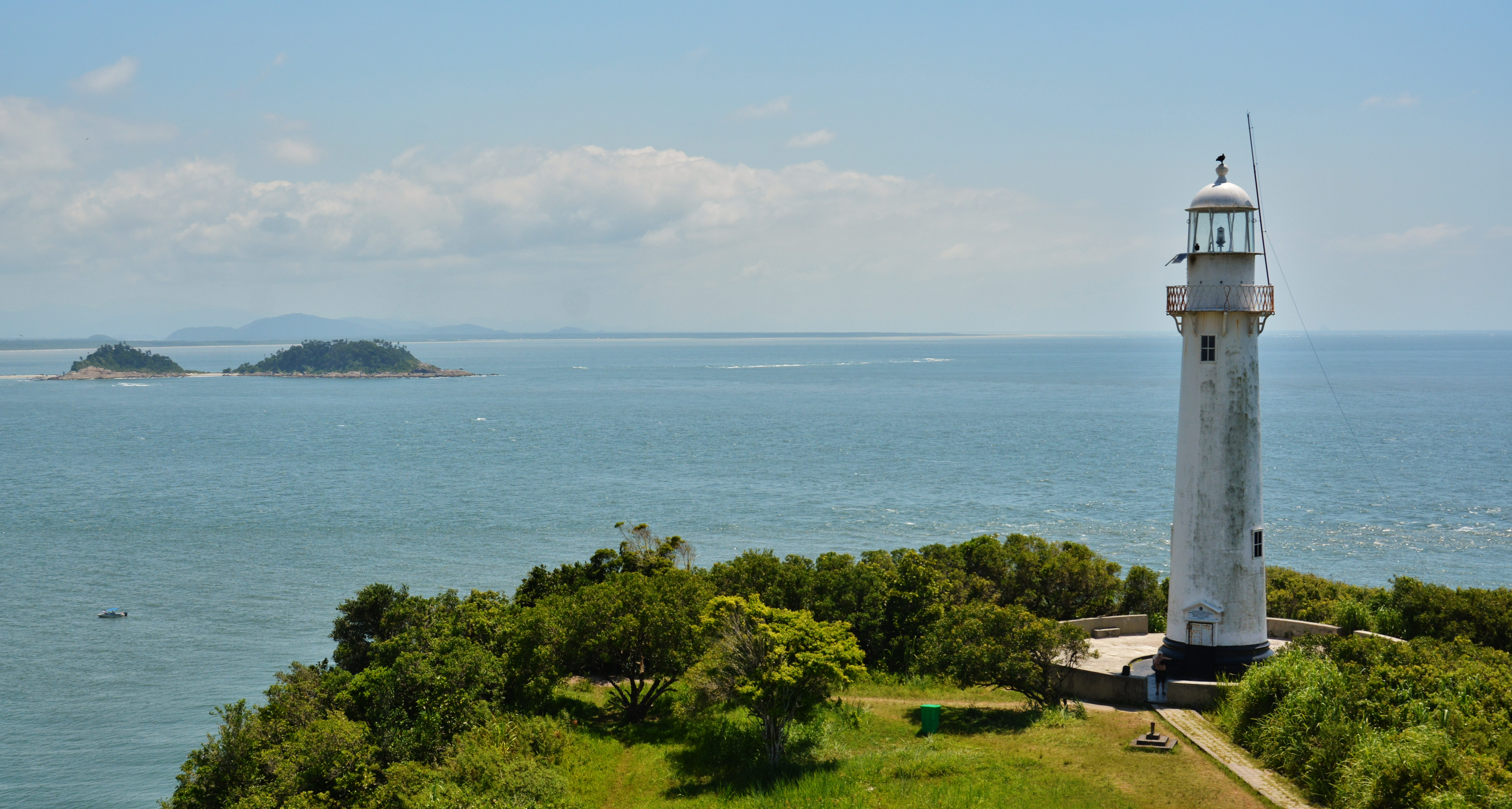
- Interactive map of Ilha do Mel

Geography
- Location: Paranaguá, Paraná
- Coordinates: 25°30′42″S 48°20′20″W
- Area: 27.1 km^{2} (10.5 sq mi)

Administration
- Brazil

Demographics
- Population: 910 (2000)

Ilha do Mel (English: Island of Honey) is a Brazilian island, located in the state of Paraná, 4 kilometers from the coast. Although the closest part of the mainland to the island is the city of Pontal do Paraná, Ilha do Mel belongs to the municipality of Paranaguá, 24 kilometers away.

The island is a permanent environmental conservation area, and 95% of the territory is reserved for local flora and fauna. Therefore, human presence is strictly controlled: the maximum admission is 5,000 people per day. This arrangement directly affects tourism, which is the island's main economic activity. Ilha do Mel's beaches are considered among Brazil's most beautiful. No motor vehicles of any kind can enter the island, nor can animal-drawn vehicles. There are no paved grounds, nor is there any public lighting system in operation.

== History ==
The earliest records of human presence on the island date back about 6,000 years. Two sambaquis were discovered: deposits of organic material or limestone (such as pieces of shells) accumulated by human activity. These archaeological finds indicate the presence of humans on the island. Before Portuguese colonization, the region of Ilha do Mel was populated by an indigenous group known as carijós, from the Tupi-Guaran family. Then Europeans landed on the island and mixed with the indigenous people.

There are no sure traces of the first arrival of Europeans in Ilha do Mel; however, it is known that settlers arrived on the Island of Superagui (a geographical point very close to Ilha do Mel) in 1545. The inhabitants who settled there exploited the natural resources, fished, and cultivated plants such as banana and aipim, a local tuber species.

Over the years, the island has maintained the characteristic of being secretive and somewhat mysterious. In fact, until the 1980s, Ilha do Mel had no water system or even electricity in homes. Water came in 1985 and electric light in 1988. At first, the generator ran from seven to two in the morning. Only since 1998 did power become available 24 hours a day.

== Environment ==
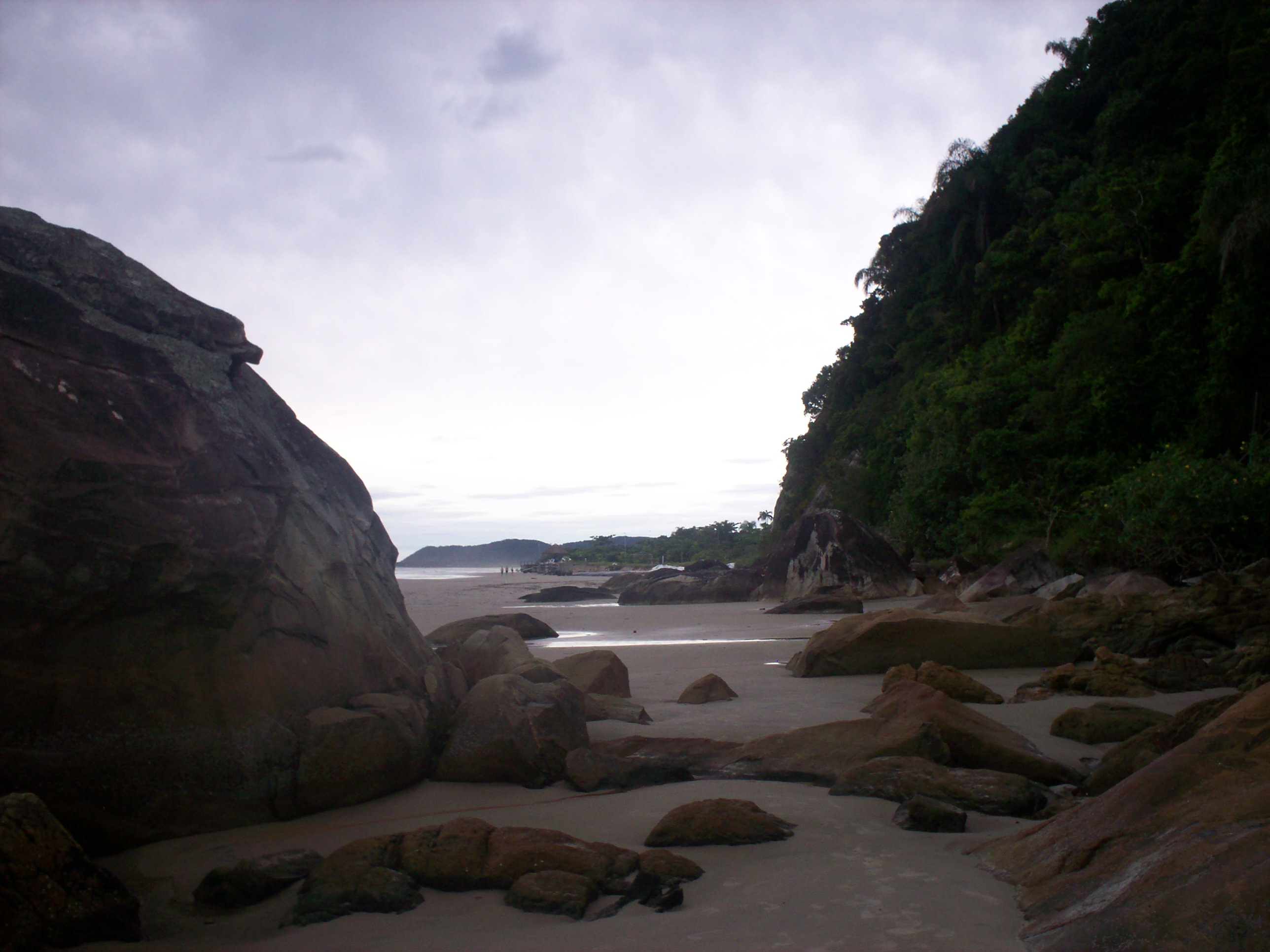
It is common to find stones like these on the beaches of Ilha do Mel

Ilha do Mel is located in the middle of the Atlantic Forest, the ecosystem originally characteristic of the Brazilian coast. Before the arrival of Portuguese colonizers, the Atlantic Forest covered 1,315,460 km^{2}, 15% of Brazil's total area. Today, only 102,012 km^{2} remains, 7% of the original area. Ilha do Mel, however, is an example of environmental preservation. The administration of the island has been in charge of IAP (Environmental Institute of Paraná) since 1980.

Of the 2,710 hectares of total area on the island, 2,241 are protected by the Ilha do Mel Ecological Station, created by the Paraná State Government in 1982. More than 338 hectares belong to the Ilha do Mel State Park. Only 120 hectares of the island (7.8 percent of the total area) are designated for human settlement. In addition, under a 2004 law, it is prohibited to construct any new buildings on the island. Only modifications in existing structures are accepted.

The law aims to preserve not only the area already protected in environmental parks but also the nature present in the area of habitation. In recent years, it has been observed that while environmental preservation areas have been kept in excellent condition, the same has not been true for areas around human settlements.

== Geography ==
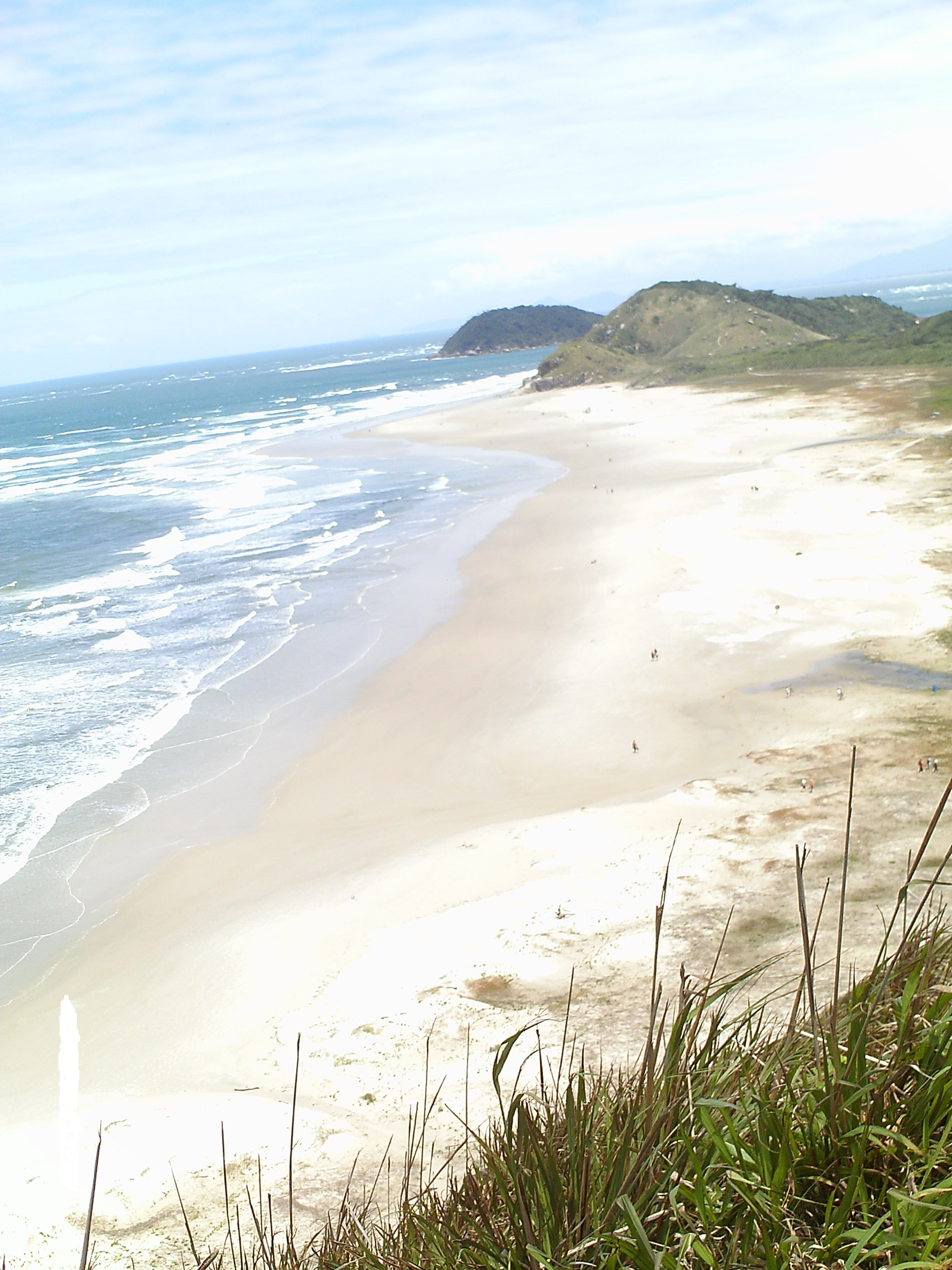
“Praia de Fora” view from the lighthouse mountain.

Ilha do Mel is located in the Southern Region of Brazil, at latitude 25°30'S and longitude 48°20'W, about 4 kilometers from the nearest city, Pontal do Paraná, and 24 kilometers from Paranaguá. The state capital of Paraná, Curitiba, is about 100 kilometers away. The island map is similar to number eight; however, with one part much larger than the other. The larger part contains the Ecological Station and the Fortress. There are buildings only in the regions near the coast, facing the sea. No paths are passing through this part of the island.

The smaller part, on the other hand, is the most populated part and the one that houses the most restaurants, small stores, and homes of the natives. There, some paths allow people to pass through. The two piers where boats moor are located in this section of Ilha do Mel. Encantadas is located at the far end of the island, while Nova Brasília is near the isthmus, which joins the two parts of the island. The isthmus has been the subject of geological study for many years, mainly because of the fear that the erosion process will split Ilha do Mel into two different islands. There is no consensus on the future of the site. Some say it is only a matter of time until the final separation.

Other research, however, has found that the extent of the isthmus is very influential due to tides and it cannot be said when or if separation will happen.

Year	Width of isthmus
1954	152 meters
1980	85 meters
1987	47 meters
1991	23 meters
1992	4 meters
1995	0
1998	10 meters
2001	20 meters
2002	15 meters
2003	20 meters
2004	30 meters

Source: Ilha do Mel Preserve

The island is characterized by a large amount of relief. The highest point is Morro do Miguel (English: Miguel's Mountain), with 151 meters.

== Tourism ==
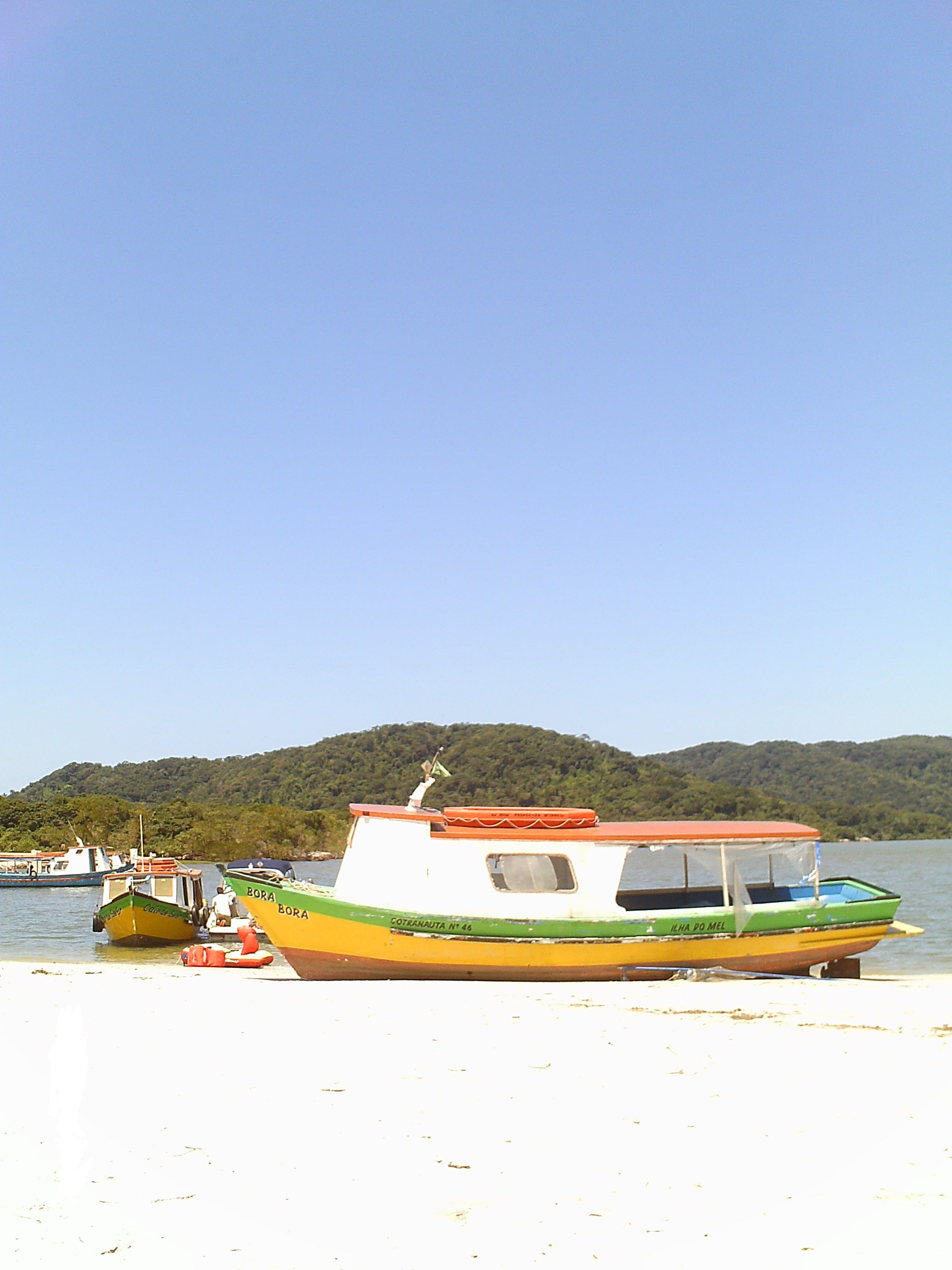
One of the boats that bring tourists to the island

Tourism is the main economic activity on the island. The busiest periods are summer and holidays. Since there is a limit of 5,000 people per day, there is a possibility for tourists not to be allowed on the ferry to Ilha do Mel. However, this situation is not very common and usually only happens on the New Year's Eve holiday or Carnival.

There is only one way to get to Ilha do Mel: by boat. Boats from Paranaguá arrive at the island after 1h30. The other option via Pontal do Paraná is faster: about a 30-minute trip. When purchasing the ticket, tourists can choose between two destinations: Nova Brasília or Encantadas. These are the names of the two main beaches. Cars cannot be transported in boats. There are no hotels on the island. The most common choice is "pousadas," less complex structures than hotels, however, with the same function. The most common camping spot is the garden in front of the native house. Prices vary throughout the year.

Ilha do Mel attracts different types of tourists. A large presence of foreigners is observed, mainly other South Americans. Surfers also appear frequently on the island. In fact, according to the Brazilian Professional Surfing Association, the beaches of Ilha do Mel are the best in the state of Paraná to practice the sport.

== Tourist attractions ==
Ilha do Mel is known for its combination of natural and historical beauty. These locales are the main attractions of the island:

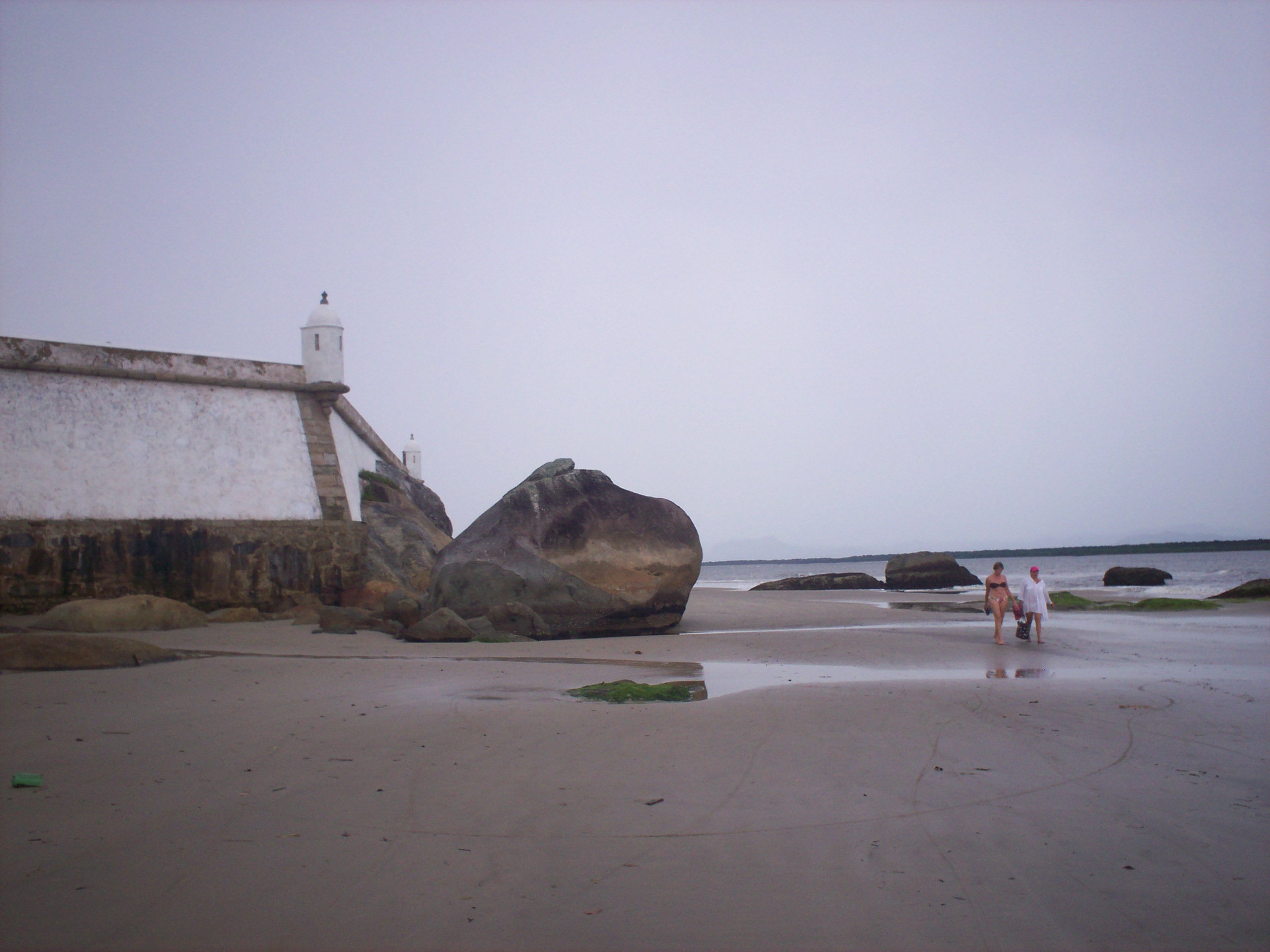
The Fortress as seen from the beach

=== Farol das Conchas ===
Located near the pier in Nova Brasília, the Farol das Conchas (English: Lighthouse of shells) was built in 1872 by order of Dom Pedro I, then Emperor of Brazil. The building material was brought from Scotland, a land at the time strongly associated with lighthouse construction. The purpose of the lighthouse was to help locate ships passing towards the Baía de Paranaguá (English: Bay of Paranaguá). Today the lighthouse continues to function. For that matter, it is a tourist attraction because it is located above a mountain from where much of the island, the sea, the beaches, and even the isthmus can be seen.

=== Fortress of Nossa Senhora dos Prazeres ===
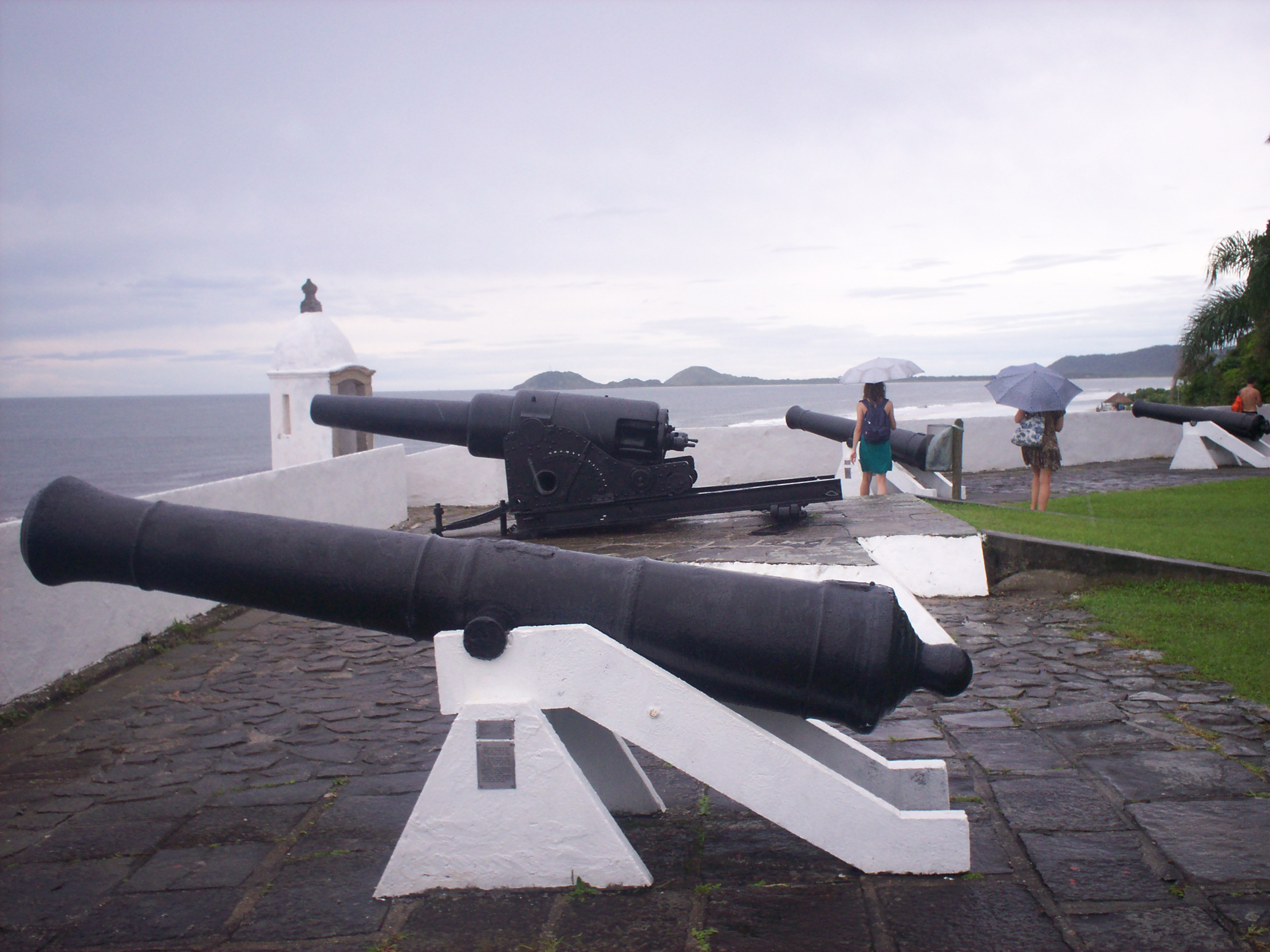
The cannons present inside the Fortress

The only building of historical significance in the largest part of the island, the Fortress of Nossa Senhora dos Prazeres was built in the 18th century. Work was finished in 1769. The building has walls 1.5m thick. The construction was made because of the war between Portugal and Spain over territories in South America. The Portuguese considered Ilha do Mel a strategic location to protect. However, it turned out to be less important than expected since Spanish ships had been known to reach Paranaguá without intervention from the fortress.

During World War II, Ilha do Mel became a "war zone." About 200 soldiers occupied the site. Another section was activated above Morro da Baleia (English: Whale Hill), just in front of the Fortress, with cannons and mazes to hide them. Up there, there is also a vantage point with a view of the sea.

=== Encantadas Cave ===
The Encantadas cave is the main attraction of that beach and the most important natural attraction on the entire island. The cave was built through the constant action of the sea on the rocks during the passage of years. Beyond the natural process, the cave is full of mystery.

People's legend has it that an Indigenous couple had fallen in love, but the families were not in favor of the relationship. Nevertheless, they had decided to marry. The girl's father, however, found out about them and cast a curse on them: all of the couple's daughters would become killer mermaids. The young people stayed together, but they could not escape the curse. According to legend, the mermaids chose the very cave of Encantadas as the place to attract men with their songs and then kill them.

=== Name ===
The origin of the name Ilha do Mel is not known. One of the most credible hypotheses concerns a German Admiral named Mehl and his family, who, before World War I, had engaged in beekeeping on the island. There are records of other members of the armed forces producing honey there. The same word, "Mehl," which means "flour" in German, may be the origin of the island's name keeping in mind that Ilha do Mel was in the past a place where a variety of goods were traded, among them flour.

There is another island called Ilha do Mel somewhat to the south, in the Baía of Babitonga, in the State of Santa Catarina. Before the current name was made official, the island was called Ilha da Baleia ("Whale Island") because of the design of its map, which resembles the animal.

=== Transport ===
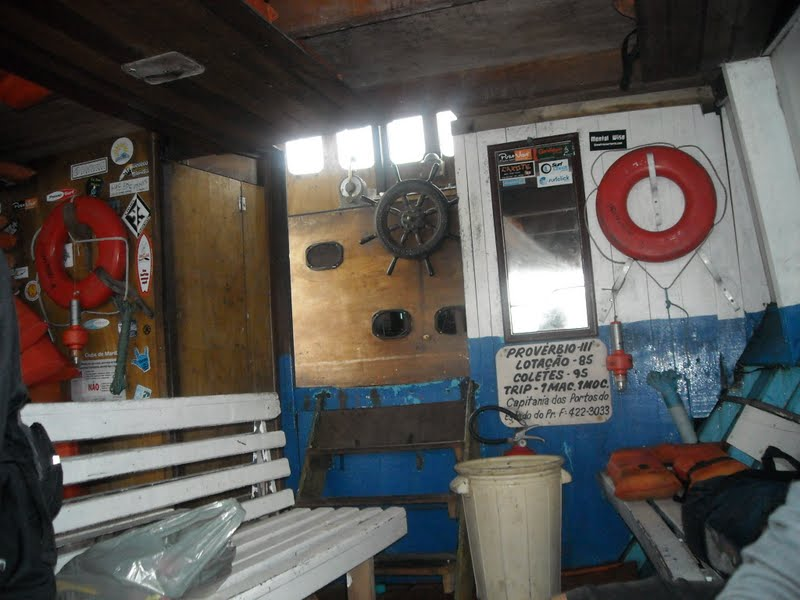
A look inside a boat

Since all types of motor vehicles are prohibited from entering the island, there are no proper streets there, only small footpaths. The only way of transportation inside Ilha do Mel is by bicycle. There are several places to rent it and no public transportation system. Transportation between the beaches of Nova Brasília and Encantadas is done with the same boats that go to the mainland. Near the piers, boats can be taken to specific places such as the Fortress. Prices vary according to the time of year and the boat owner.

=== Infrastructure ===
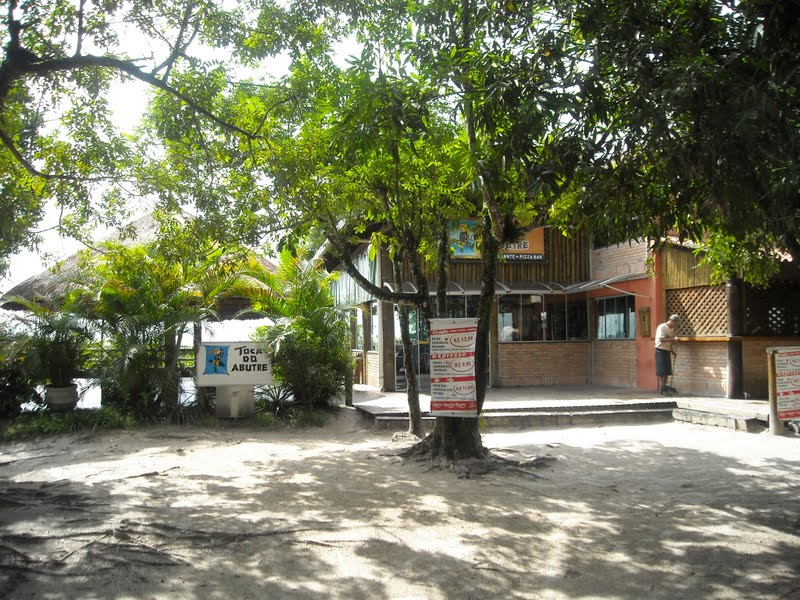
An example of a trail near the Nova Brasilia pier.

Ilha do Mel does not have some basic services for the populace, such as hospitals or pharmacies. In the area of health, the only facility available is an emergency room near the Nova Brasília pier, therefore, tourists are requested to bring their medicines. There are only two elementary schools on the entire island: one in the Nova Brasília area and the other in Encantadas. The school in Encantadas takes the student up to grade four and the one in Nova Brasília, up to grade six. From the seventh year on, pupils must take the boat to Pontal do Paraná or Paranguá to go to school.

Although the island has received electricity for more than 20 years, there is no public lighting system in operation. Therefore, it is recommended that people bring flashlights during the evenings. Also, in the evenings, the lands of Nova Brasília and Encantadas become incommunicable with each other. Communication options during the day are through boats or by walking between the beaches and stones-there are no paths inland. These two options are not available in the evening.

== Climate ==
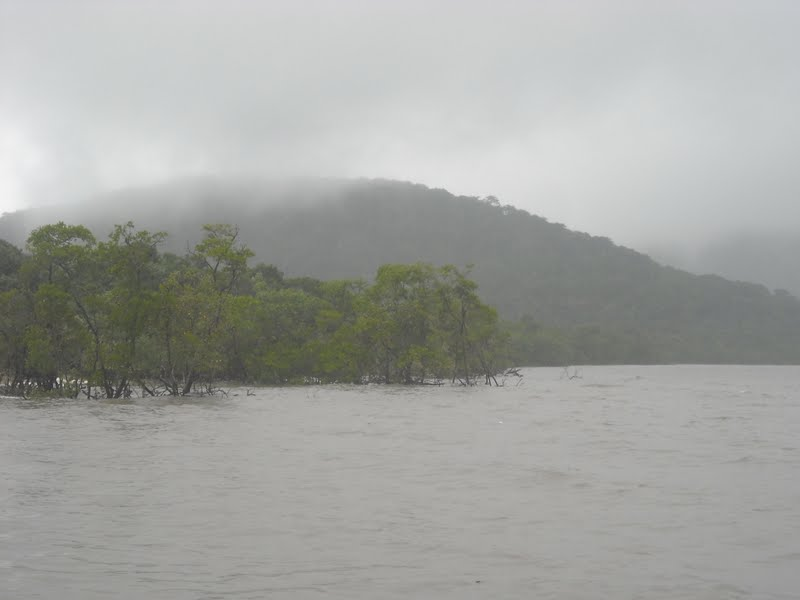
A cold foggy morning on the island

Ilha do Mel is located in a transition zone between tropical and humid subtropical climate. Because of its proximity to the sea, the temperature variation during the day is not as great as in cities such as Curitiba. The same characteristic of being close to the Ocean limits the heat in summer and the cold in winter.

The hottest month in Ilha do Mel is January, which coincides with the vacation season for most Brazilians. The average maximum temperature is about 28 degrees, while the minimum remains around 19. Summer, however, is also the wettest season of the year. February is the month when it rains the most: nearly 300 mm.

Winter, on the other hand, represents the dry period: July is the month with the least rain of the year: only 67 mm. The coldest month is September, at the end of winter, instead of July or June, when the lowest temperatures in Brazil are recorded. The coldest season is also the time when the island most often has fog, usually at dawn.

Month	January	February	March	April	May	June	July	August	September	October	November	December
Maximum average (°C)	28,2	27,4	27,4	25,3	23,4	21,4	21,9	21,7	20,2	22,3	22,9	24,9
Minimum average (°C)	19,4	19,3	19,0	16,7	14,2	12,4	12,0	13,1	13,1	14,6	15,7	17,5
Average rainfall (mm)	261,5	293,9	242,2	156,8	115,3	108,5	67,2	78,2	127,1	148,9	134,2	166,6
Fonte: Tempo Agora

== See also ==
- Tupi–Guarani languages
- Paranaguá
- Pontal do Paraná
- Paraná
- Fortaleza de Nossa Senhora dos Prazeres

== Bibliography ==
- Sperb, Matias; Fontoura, Leandro; Telles, Daniel (2010). "Meio ambiente e turismo na Ilha do Mel, PR: Enfoque sobre a legislação aplicada" [Environment and tourism on Ilha do Mel, PR: A look at the legislation applied=] (PDF). Web Archive (in Portuguese) (32). Archived from the original (PDF) on 28 November 2010.
- Souza, Elaine; Krueger, Cláudia; Sluter, Cláudia (2003). "Determinação das variações volumétricas no istmo da Ilha do Mel utilizando PDGPS" [Determining volumetric variations on the isthmus of Ilha do Mel using PDGPS]. Bol. Ciênc. Geod., sec. Artigos, Curitiba (in Portuguese). 9 (1): 53–74.
