= Catanduvense =

Catanduvense may refer to:

- A resident of Catanduva, São Paulo, Brazil
- Grêmio Catanduvense de Futebol, a Brazilian football club founded 1999
- Grêmio Esportivo Catanduvense, a defunct Brazilian football club, active 1970–1993
