= Ilha do Mel State Park =

State park in Paraná, Brazil

- Parque Estadual da Ilha do Mel
- IUCN category II (national park)
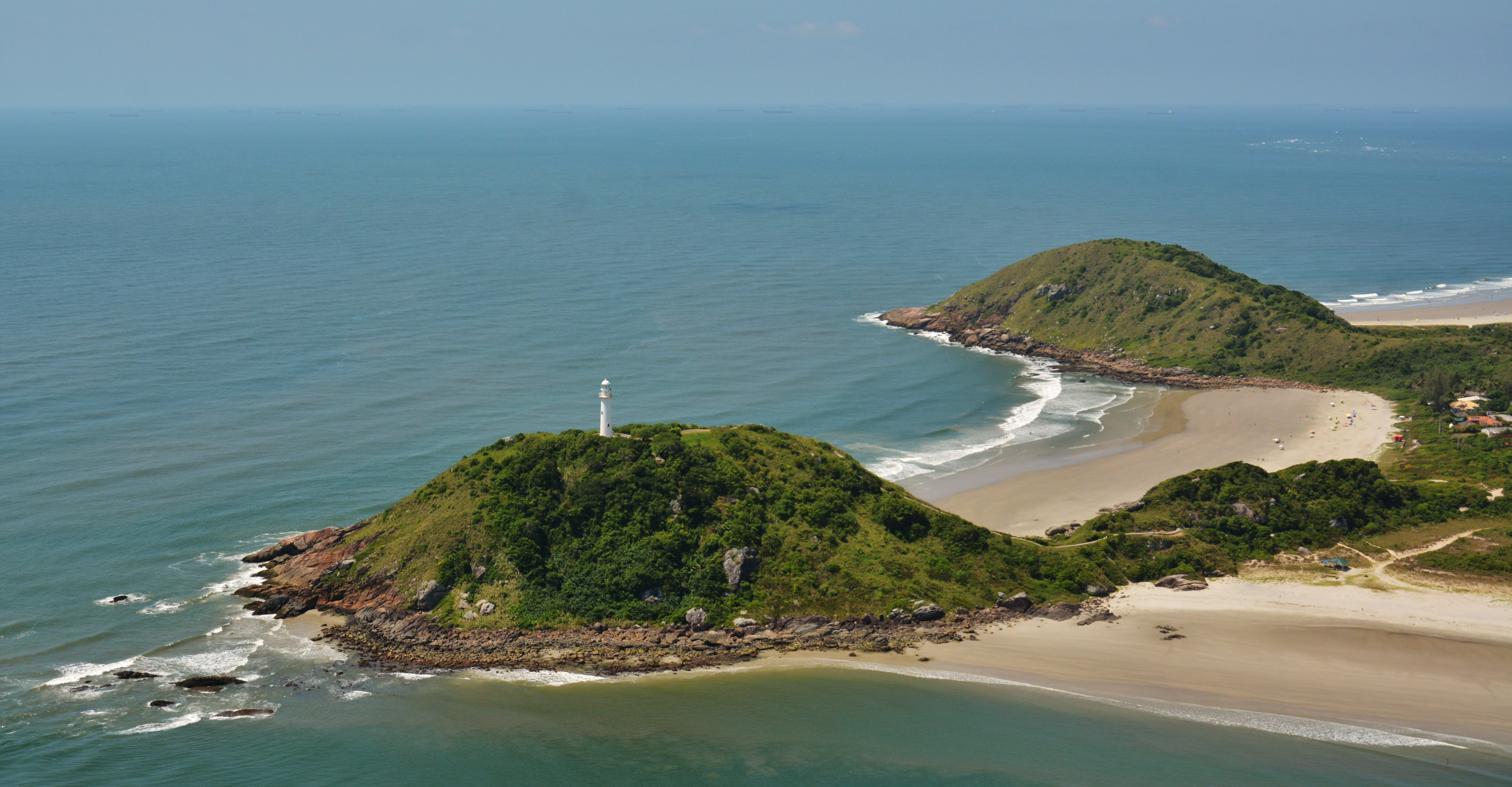
- Lighthouse (farol) at the north tip of the park

- Location within Brazil
- Location: Paranaguá, Paraná
- Coordinates: 25.5575°S 48.3059°W
- Area: 393 hectares (3.93 km^{2})
- Designation: State park
- Created: 21 March 2002
- Administrator: Instituto Ambiental do Paraná

The Ilha do Mel State Park (Portuguese: Parque Estadual da Ilha do Mel) is a state park in the state of Paraná, Brazil, located in the municipality of Paranaguá. It is a very small island, with a lot of fauna and flora, due to its small index of urbanization. It has 25 kilometers of beaches, and the population of the Island is distributed among some small villages: Encantadas, Nova Brasilia, Farol, Praia Grande and Fortaleza.

== Island ==
Inside the island, the use of vehicles and traction animals are not allowed, in order to avoid damaging it and preserve its natural beauties, and also the number of visitors on the island can't exceed 5.000 people. When visiting the island, the walking through it is made on foot by trails of land, for better appreciation of nature and also don't damaging. The island is not all available to visit, there are limited areas that are for preservation. The highlights of Ilha do Mel are the Gruta das Encantadas, the Lighthouse of Conchas and the Fortress of N. S. dos Prazeres, all open to public visitation.

== Tourist attractions ==
"Farol das Conchas" is a place built to modernize the Brazilian commercial navigation the Emperor D. Pedro II ordered, in 1870, the beginning of the works, carried out by an English company under the supervision of the engineer Zózimo Barroso. The materials were imported from Scotland, which at the time had the most advanced technology in the field. Opened on April 1, 1872 and located at the top of the Shell Hill, it can be sighted from almost every point of Ilha do Mel.

"Fortaleza de Nossa Senhora dos Prazeres" the only military monument of the XVIII century in Paraná, installed on the foothills of Morro da Baleia, erected with walls of one and a half meters thick, Fortaleza was completed on April 23, 1769. At the top of Morro da Baleia, near Fortaleza, are canyons and stone trenches. It is called the "Labirinto dos Canhões". There is also a gazebo with a panoramic view. You get there by trail on the hill.

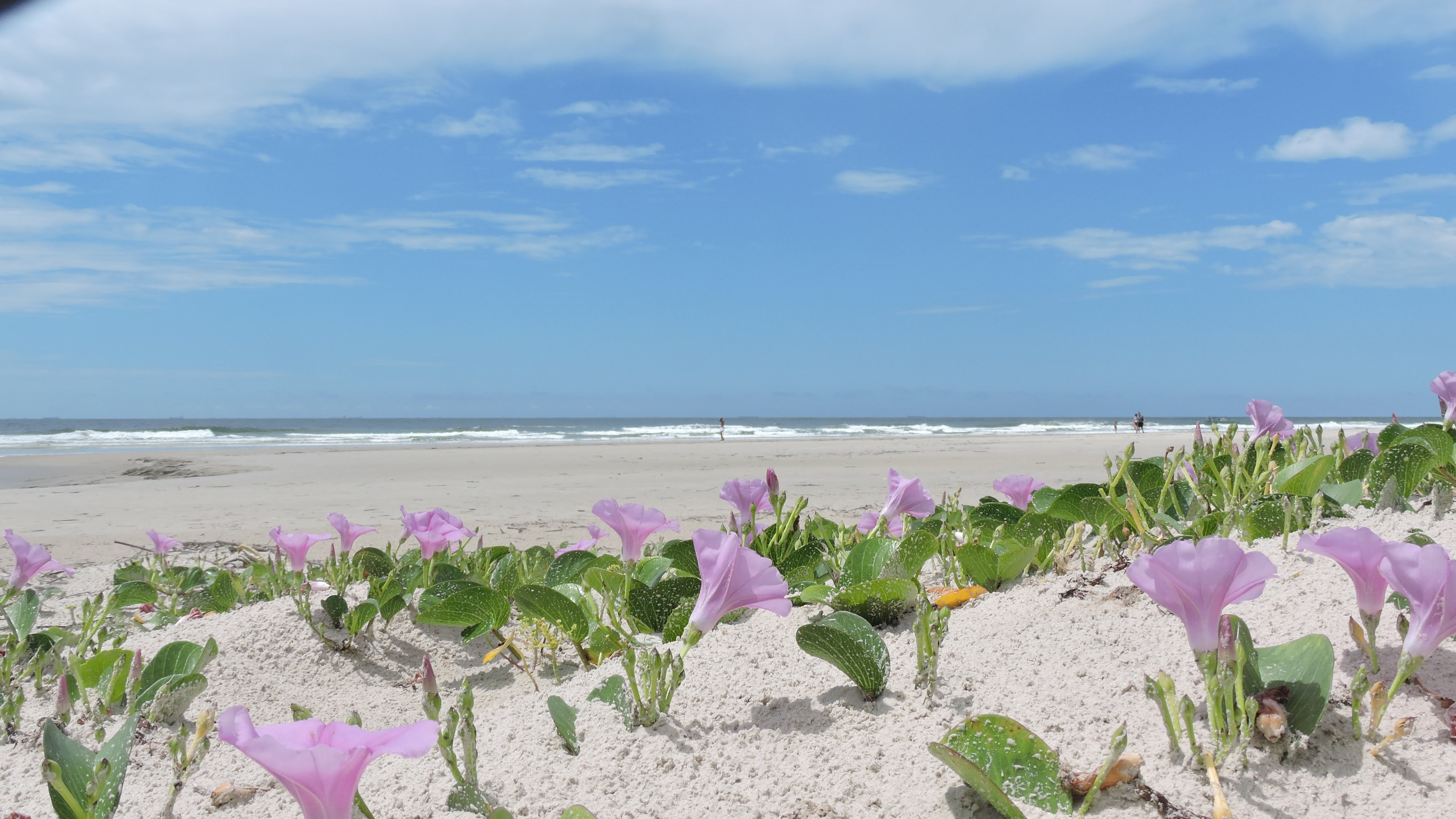
Ecological Station of Ilha do Mel, Paranaguá (2018) by Limario1964

"Gruta das encantadas" is located in the southern part of the Island, is the most important natural patrimony of Ilha do Mel. The Grotto Hill, is formed by a type of rock called migmatito is divided by a vein of black rock, the diabase. The Grotto was formed by the action of the sea on the diabase, less resistant than the migmatite. To facilitate access, a footbridge was built leading to its entrance.

"Istmo" located in Nova Brasília, the Istmo or Passa-Passa (as it is known by locals), is the narrowest part of the Honey Island and has undergone a process of erosion since 1930, but today the water no longer crosses more than one side as it did in 1995. The width today reaches 30 meters and only in high tide the water cross the place.

== Location ==
The Ilha do Mel State Park is in the southern part of the Ilha do Mel in the east of the municipality of Paranaguá, Paraná. The island, which has an area of about 2,760 hectares (6,800 acres), is at the entrance of Paranaguá Bay on the southern coast of the state of Paraná. The park has an area of about 393 hectares (970 acres). The northern part of the island is protected by the Ilha do Mel Ecological Station. The island is opposite the Superagui National Park to the north. It is in the Iguape-Cananéia-Paranaguá estuary lagoon complex.

The park includes the Praia Grande, Praia de Fora (Encantadas), Praia de Fora (Farol), Praia do Miguel and Prainha do Caraguatá beaches and the area known as Saco do Limoeiro. It may be reached by a 30-minute boat trip from the terminal at Pontal do Sul, or by a 90-minute boat trip from Paranaguá. There are landing piers at Encantadas and at Nova Brasília, which includes the lighthouse and the fort. Visitors may bring bicycles, but no motorized vehicles are allowed.

== History ==
The Ilha do Mel State Park was created by the governor Jaime Lerner by state decree 5506 of 21 March 2002 on the Ilha do Mel (Honey Island). The objective was to preserve the natural environment of the beach, the rocky cliffs, areas of marine influence, salt marshes, remnants of dense submontane Atlantic Forest and lowland restinga forest, to protect archaeological sites, particularly the middens, and to protect the rich fauna. Management responsibility was assigned to the Instituto Ambiental do Paraná (Paraná Environment Institute), which had five years to prepare a management plan. Existing residents would be relocated within ten years.

The park is part of the Lagamar Mosaic of conservation units. It one of the conservation units of the Serra do Mar Ecological Corridor (Corredor Ecológico da Serra do Mar). It is also part of the core zone of the Atlantic Forest Biosphere Reserve.

== Sources ==
- "Contextualização do Parque Estadual da Ilha do Mel" (PDF), Plano de Manejo - Parque Estadual Ilha do Mel (in Portuguese), STCP Engenharia de Projetos Ltda., 2011
- Jaime Lerner (21 March 2002), Decreto Nº 5506 - 21/03/2002 (PDF) (in Portuguese), archived from the original (PDF) on 17 April 2014
- Unidades de Conservação - Mosaico do Litoral Sul de São Paulo e do Litoral do Paraná - LAGAMAR (in Portuguese), ICMBio, archived from the original on 2019-05-27
