= Fortaleza de Nossa Senhora dos Prazeres =

- Paranaguá, Paraná in Brazil
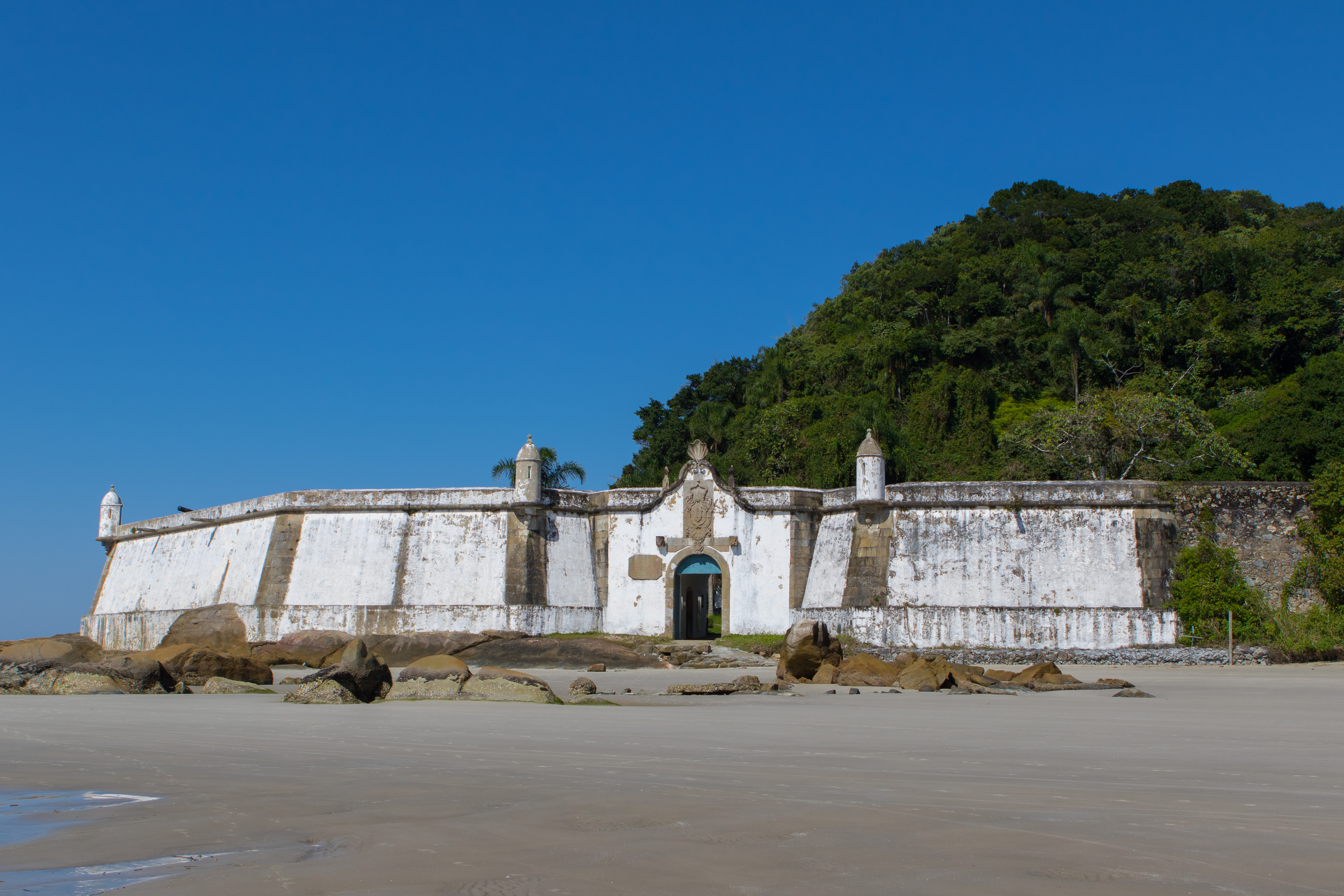
- Front view of the fort

Site information
- Type: Fort
- Open to the public: Yes
- Condition: Good

Location
- Location of Fortaleza de Nossa Senhora dos Prazeres in Brazil
- Coordinates: 25.511389°S 48.3125°W

Fortaleza de Nossa Senhora dos Prazeres is a fort located in Paranaguá, Paraná in Brazil. The fortress was used until the beginning of the 19th century, after which it gradually lost its military significance.

== See also ==
- Military history of Brazil
