= Márcio Flores =

Brazilian footballer (born 1969)

Personal information
- Full name: Márcio Rogério Flores Garcia
- Date of birth: 14 April 1969 (age 57)
- Place of birth: Novo Horizonte, Brazil
- Position: Forward

Senior career*
Years	Team	Apps	(Gls)
1988–1990	Ituano		
1989	→ Catanduvense (loan)		
1990–1991	São Paulo	6	(0)
1991–1993	Ituano		
1994	Olímpia		
- * Club domestic league appearances and goals as of 14 November 2023

Márcio Rogério Flores Garcia (born 14 April 1969), simply known as Márcio Flores, is a Brazilian former professional footballer who played as a forward.

== Career ==
Márcio Flores played most of his career at Ituano, and in the 1991 season he was part of the Brazilian champion São Paulo squad.

== Honours ==
São Paulo

- Campeonato Brasileiro: 1991

Ituano

- Campeonato Paulista Série A2: 1989
