= Ilha do Mel Ecological Station =

Ecological station in Paraná, Brazil

- Estação Ecológica da Ilha do Mel
- IUCN category Ia (strict nature reserve)
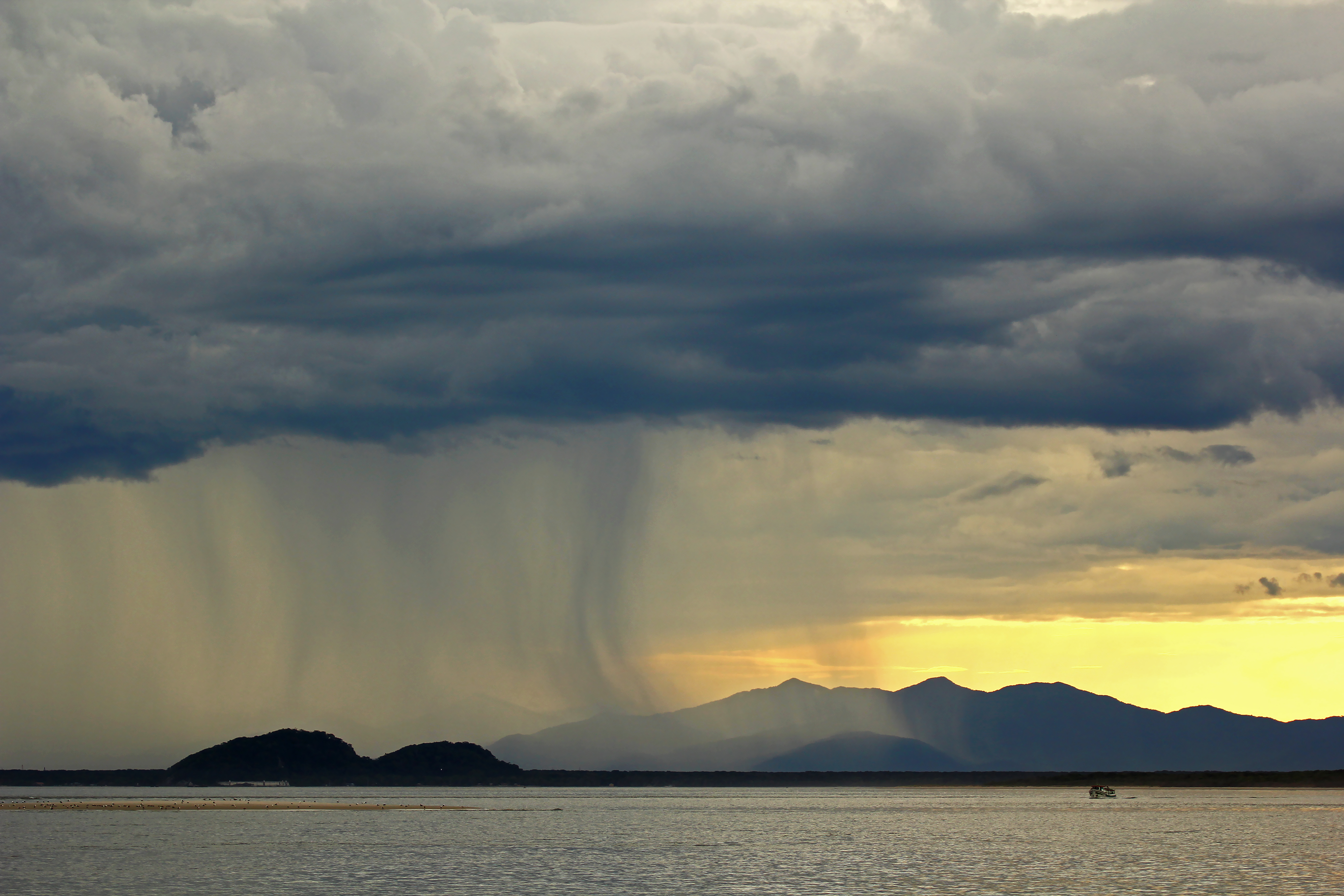
- Ilha do Mel from the Superagui National Park to the north

- Location within Brazil
- Coordinates: 25.5108°S 48.3432°W
- Area: 2,241 hectares (5,540 acres)
- Designation: Ecological station
- Created: 1982
- Administrator: Instituto Ambiental do Paraná

The Ilha do Mel Ecological Station (Portuguese: Estação Ecológica da Ilha do Mel) is an ecological station in the state of Paraná, Brazil.

== Location ==
The Ilha do Mel Ecological Station covers the northern part of the island of Ilha do Mel in the municipality of Paranaguá, Paraná. It has an area of 2,241 hectares (5,540 acres). The ecological station is the more strictly protected of two conservation units on the island, the other being the Ilha do Mel State Park. Public visits to the park are allowed for education, recreation and research. The ecological station is used primarily for scientific research, with public visits allowed only for environmental education with express permission of the administrator. The protected areas cover about 95% of the island's land area, including mangroves, restingas and forests.

Outside the conservation areas there are beautiful beaches and attractions such as the Nossa Senhora dos Prazeres Fort, the lighthouse and the Enchanted Grotto which have made the island one of the state's main tourist destinations. A management board, with government and local resident representatives, monitors implementation of the zoning rules. In 2004 there were 1,140 residents, of whom 57% were not native but had managed to build unauthorized homes or hotels. About 43% of the buildings do not conform to the plan of use, which defines the lots, lot size, height of buildings and so on.

== History ==
In 1982 the federal union heritage service transferred administration of the Ilha do Mel to the state of Paraná on condition that a conservation unit was created to protect its natural ecosystems. The Ilha do Mel Ecological Station was created on 21 September 1982 by the governor of Paraná through decree 5.454. On 27 February 1985 the state governor authorized the state department of agriculture to grant a land use concession to the residents of the island. An ordinance of 19 January 1998 defined regulations for visitors. There were modified by an ordinance of 17 March 2000.

The ecological station is part of the Lagamar mosaic of conservation units. It one of the conservation units of the Serra do Mar Ecological Corridor (Corredor Ecológico da Serra do Mar). It is also part of the core zone of the Atlantic Forest Biosphere Reserve.

== Sources ==
- "Contextualização do Parque Estadual da Ilha do Mel" (PDF), Plano de Manejo - Parque Estadual Ilha do Mel (in Portuguese), STCP Engenharia de Projetos Ltda., 2011
- ESEC da Ilha do Mel (ESEC) (in Portuguese), ISA: Instituto Socioambiental
- Unidades de Conservação - Mosaico do Litoral Sul de São Paulo e do Litoral do Paraná - LAGAMAR (in Portuguese), ICMBio, archived from the original on 2019-05-27
