= Roma Esporte Apucarana =

Brazilian football club

Roma
- Full name: Roma Esporte de Apucarana S/A Ltda.
- Nickname: Tricolor
- Founded: 14 December 2000; 25 years ago
- Ground: Estádio Bom Jesus da Lapa
- Capacity: 15,000
- League: -
- 2007: Eliminated in second stage (Série C)
Home colours	Away colours

Roma Esporte de Apucarana, usually known simply as Roma, is a Brazilian football team from the city of Apucarana, Paraná state, founded on December 14, 2000.

== History ==
On December 6, 2000, the club was founded in Barueri, São Paulo state by João Wilson Antonini with the help of Roma Incorporadora enterprise's investment. The club later made a partnership with Apucarana city hall and then moved to that city.

== Honours ==
- Copa Paraná
  - Winners (1): 2006
