= Estádio Bom Jesus da Lapa =

Football stadium in Apucarana, Brazil

Estádio Municipal Bom Jesus da Lapa
- Toca do Dragão
- Location: Apucarana, Brazil
- Owner: Apucarana City Hall
- Capacity: 13,000
- Surface: Grass

Construction
- Opened: January 28, 1967

Tenant
- Roma Esporte Apucarana

Estádio Municipal Bom Jesus da Lapa, also known as Toca do Dragão, is a football stadium located in Apucarana, Brazil. The stadium has a maximum capacity of 13,000 people, and it is located in the Minas Gerais Avenue, s/n - Apucarana, Paraná. It was inaugurated in 1967, and it is owned by Apucarana City Hall.

== History ==
Estádio Bom Jesus da Lapa was inaugurated on January 28, 1967. The stadium's attendance record currently stands at 15,000, set in 1989.
