= Nivaldo (footballer, born 1968) =

Brazilian association footballer

Personal information
- Full name: Nivaldo Soares de Oliveira Filho
- Date of birth: 5 February 1968 (age 58)
- Place of birth: Brazil
- Position: Striker

Senior career*
Years	Team	Apps	(Gls)
1988–1993	Náutico		
1994–1995	Sport		
1995–1996	Cruzeiro		
1996–1997	Atlético-MG		
1998–1999	Villa Nova		
- * Club domestic league appearances and goals

Nivaldo Soares de Oliveira Filho (born 5 February 1968) is a Brazilian former footballer who last played as a striker for Villa Nova.

== Career ==
He started his career with the Brazilian side Náutico, helping the club win the state league. On 18 October 1989, he scored the fastest goal in Brazilian top flight history eight seconds after kick-off during a 3–2 win over Atlético-MG.

== Post-playing career ==
After retiring from professional football, Nivaldo worked at a laundry.

== Personal life ==
Nivaldo is married and has children.
