= Superagui Island =

Island in Guaraqueçaba, Brazil

Superagüi Island
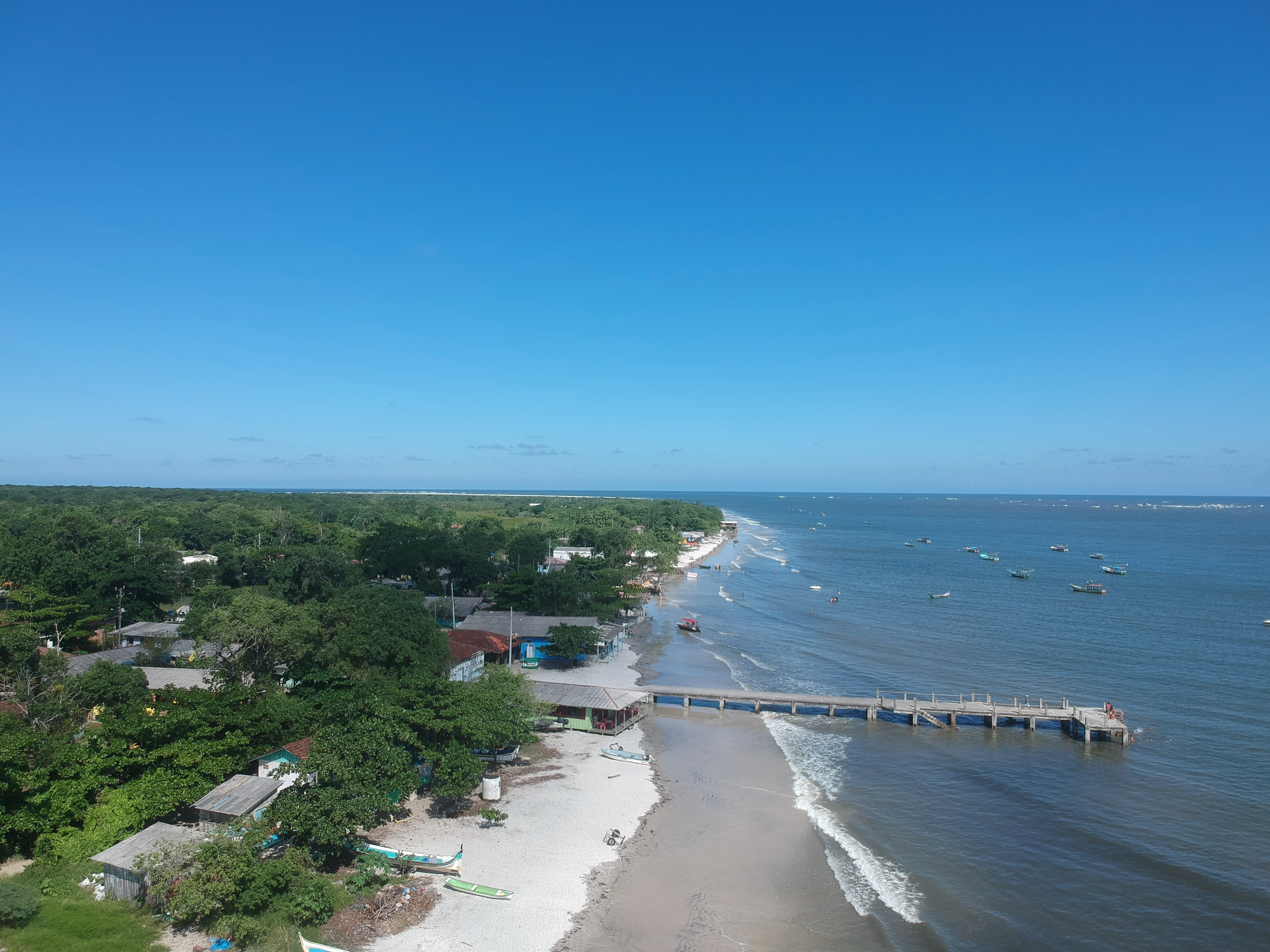
- Interactive map of Superagüi Island

Geography
- Location: Paranaguá Bay and Atlantic Ocean
- Coordinates: 25°21′S 48°11′W

Administration
- Brazil

Superagui is an island in the Brazilian state of Paraná, in Guaraqueçaba municipality. It is near the border of Paraná state with São Paulo state.

== History ==
On October 19, 1851, the colony of Superagüi was founded by Carlos Perret Gentil, who organized families who wanted to come to his colony as farmers. There were ten Swiss families, two German families, and five French families. In total there were 85 colonists.

== Distinctions ==
The Superagüi National Park was declared a Biosphere reserve in 1991 and a World Heritage Site in 1999 by UNESCO.
