= Paulo Roberto (footballer, born 1964) =

Brazilian footballer

Personal information
- Full name: Paulo Roberto de Araújo Prestes
- Date of birth: 21 April 1964 (age 62)
- Place of birth: Porto Alegre, Brazil
- Height: 1.81 m (5 ft 11 1/2 in)
- Position: Left back

Youth career
- 1979–1983: Internacional

Senior career*
Years	Team	Apps	(Gls)
1983	Internacional		
1984	Botafogo		
1984–1985	Palmeiras		
1986–1996	Atlético Mineiro		
1997	Internacional		
- * Club domestic league appearances and goals

Paulo Roberto de Araújo Prestes or simply Paulo Roberto (born 21 April 1964), is a Brazilian retired footballer who played as a left back.
