= Leonardo Manzi =

Brazilian footballer (born 1969)

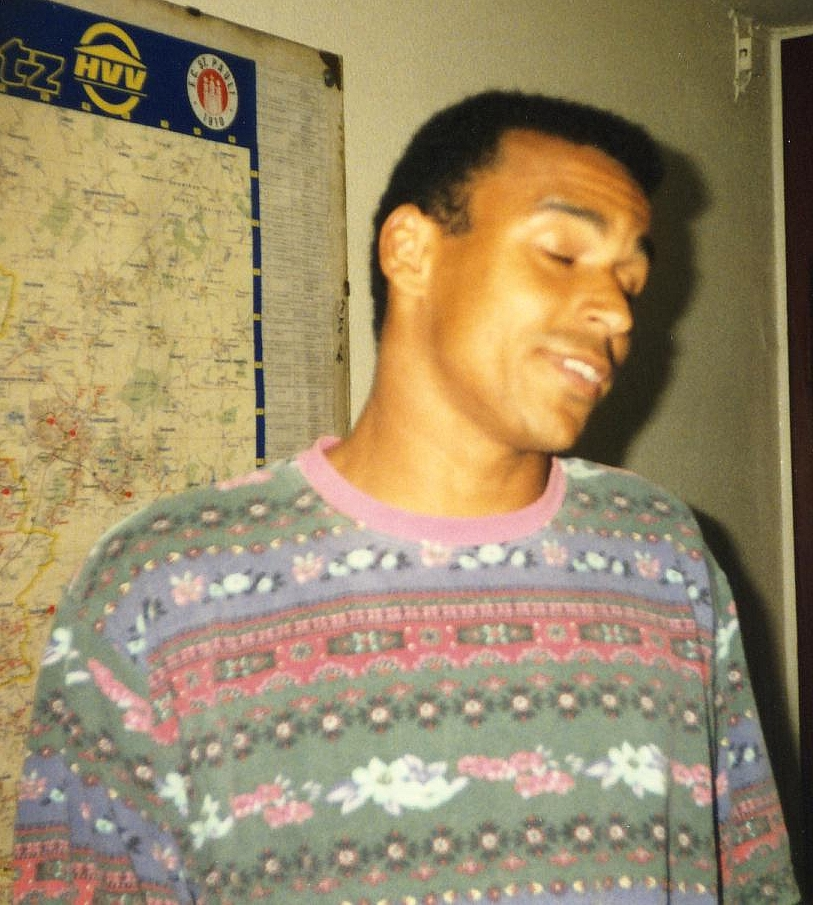
- Manzi in the 1992–93 season

Personal information
- Date of birth: April 28, 1969 (age 57)
- Place of birth: Goiânia, Brazil
- Height: 1.87 m (6 ft 2 in)
- Position: Striker

Senior career*
| Years | Team | Apps | (Gls) |
| –1988 | Vila Nova | | |
| 1988–1989 | Santos | | |
| 1989–1996 | FC St. Pauli | 112 | (16) |
| 1996–1997 | Hannover 96 | 8 | (2) |
| 1997–1999 | BV Cloppenburg | | |
| 1999–2000 | Internacional | | |
| 2001 | Juventude | | |
| 2001–2003 | Gama | | |
| 2003–2004 | Juventude | | |
| 2004–2005 | Vila Nova | | |
| 2006–2008 | SV Wilhelmshaven | 32 | (2) |

Managerial career
- 2007: SV Wilhelmshaven (assistant)
- * Club domestic league appearances and goals

Leonardo Caetano Manzi (born April 28, 1969) is a Brazilian football coach and a former player.
