= Paranaguá =

- Municipality
- Municipality of Paranaguá
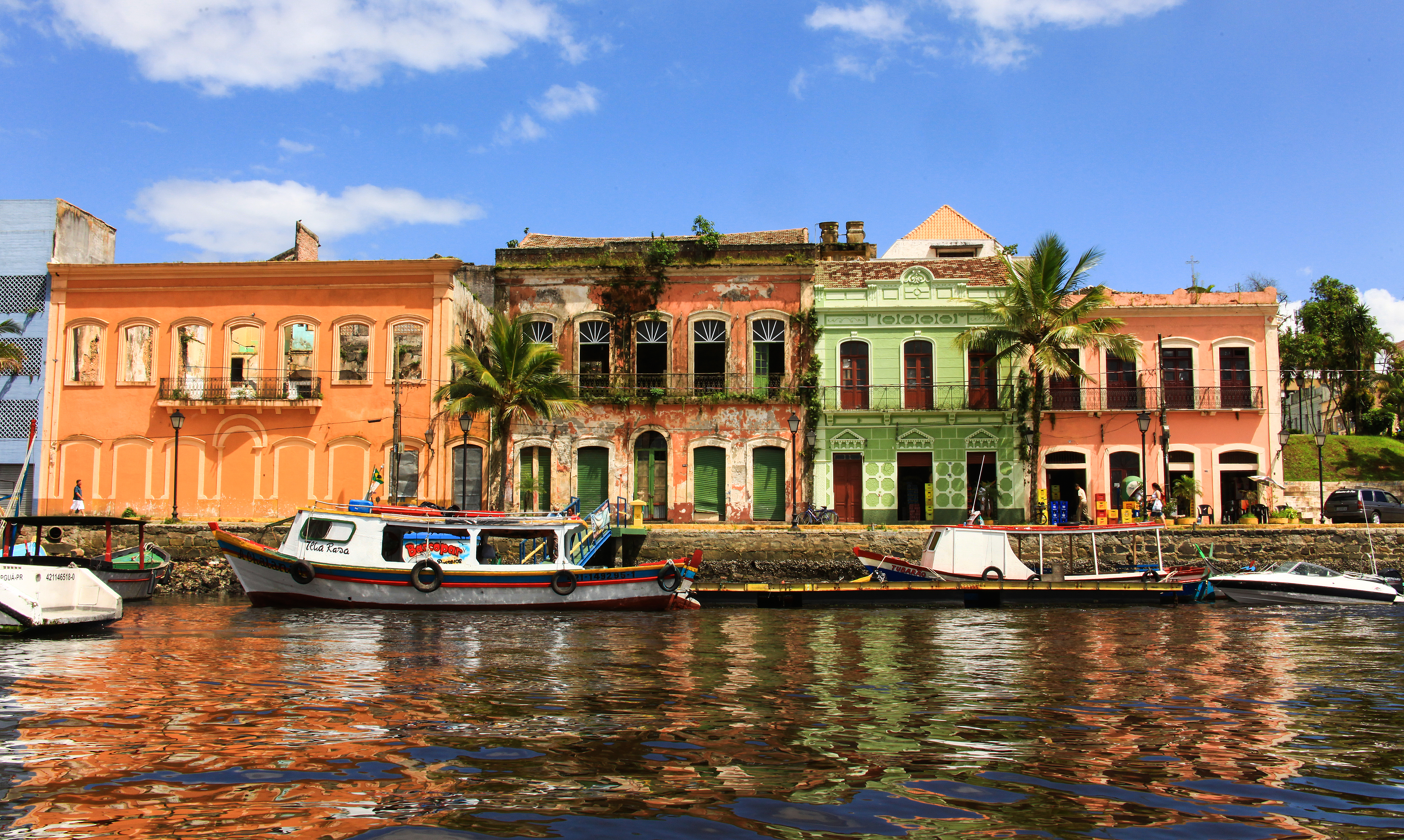
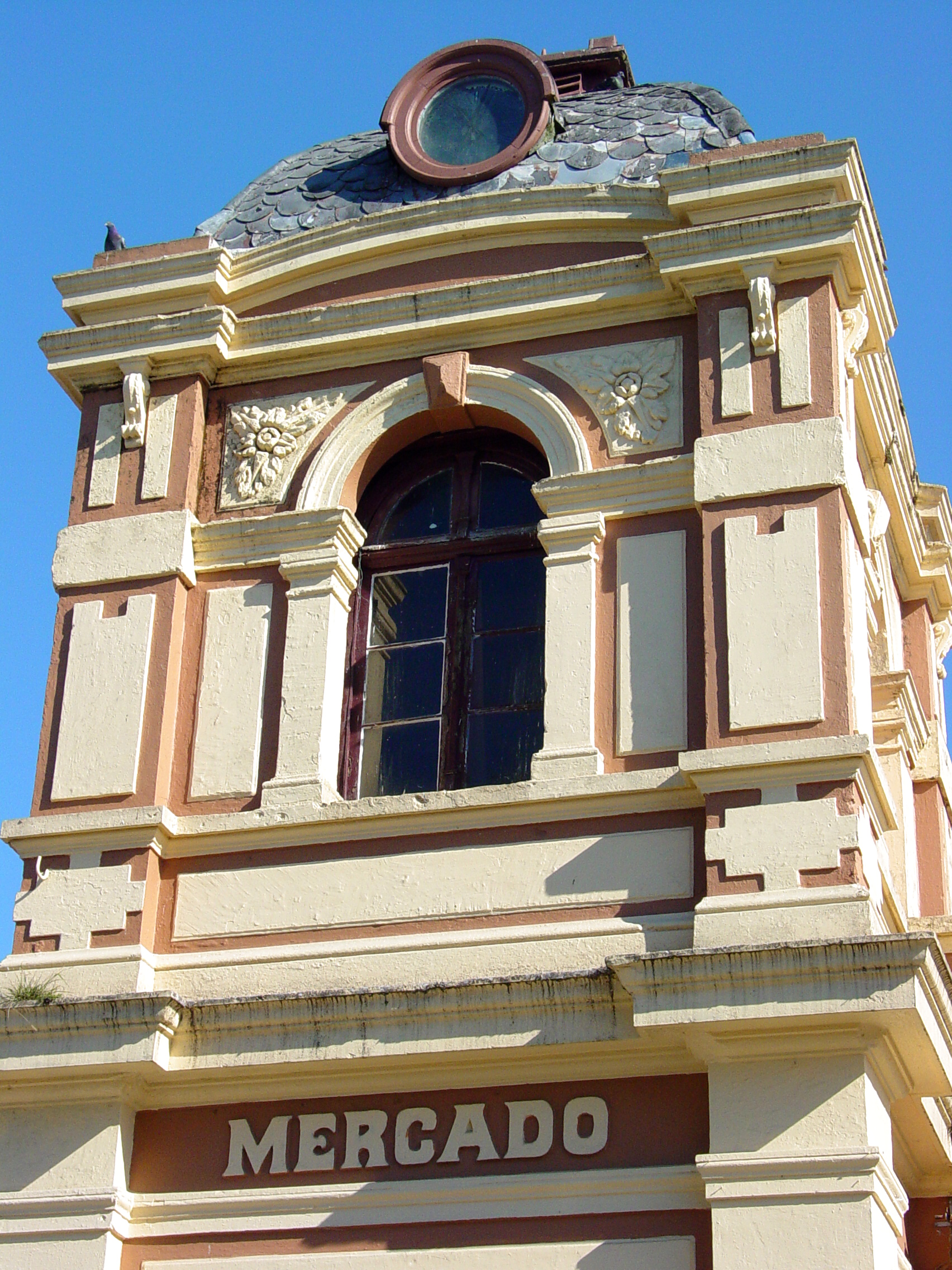
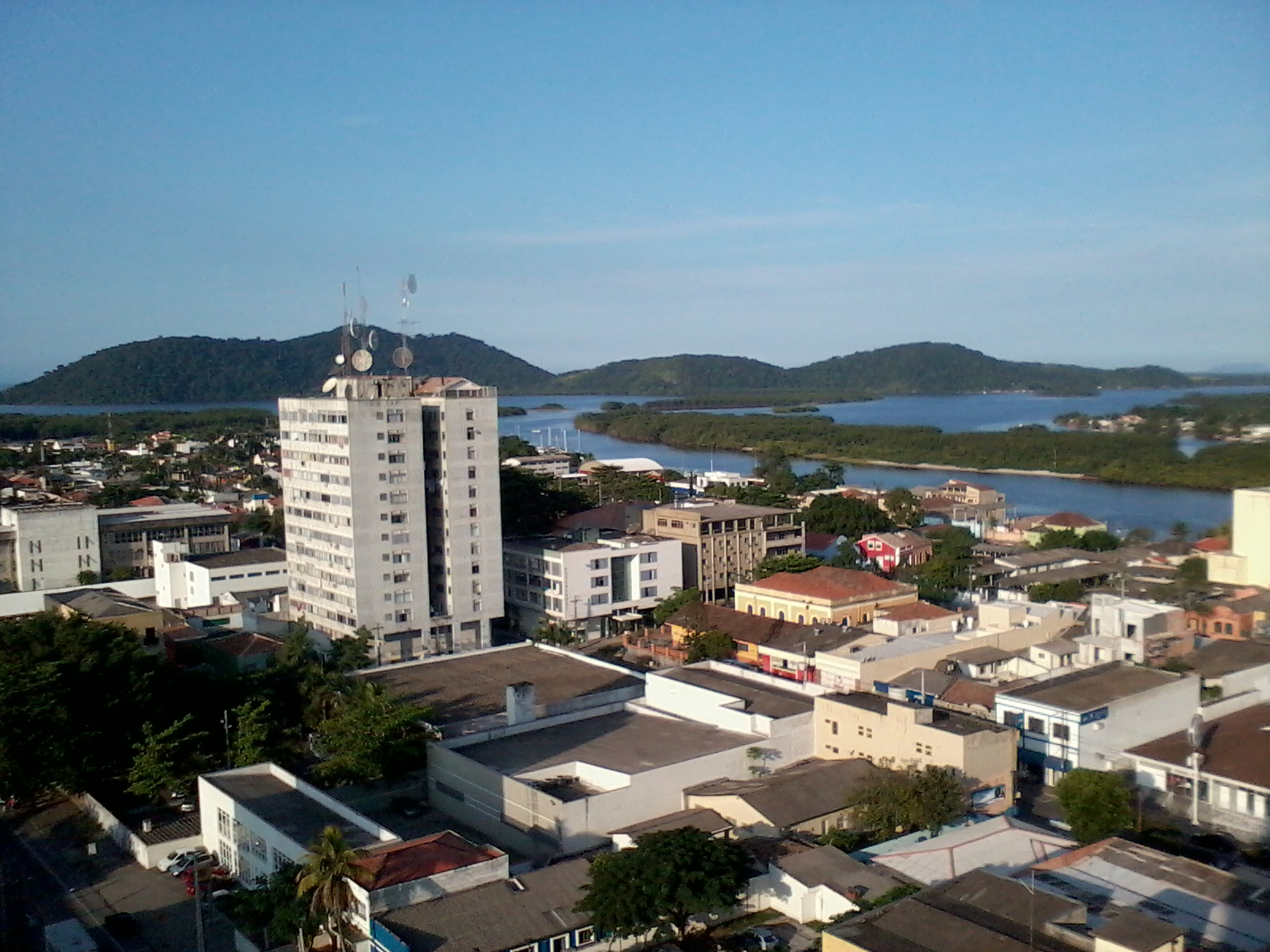
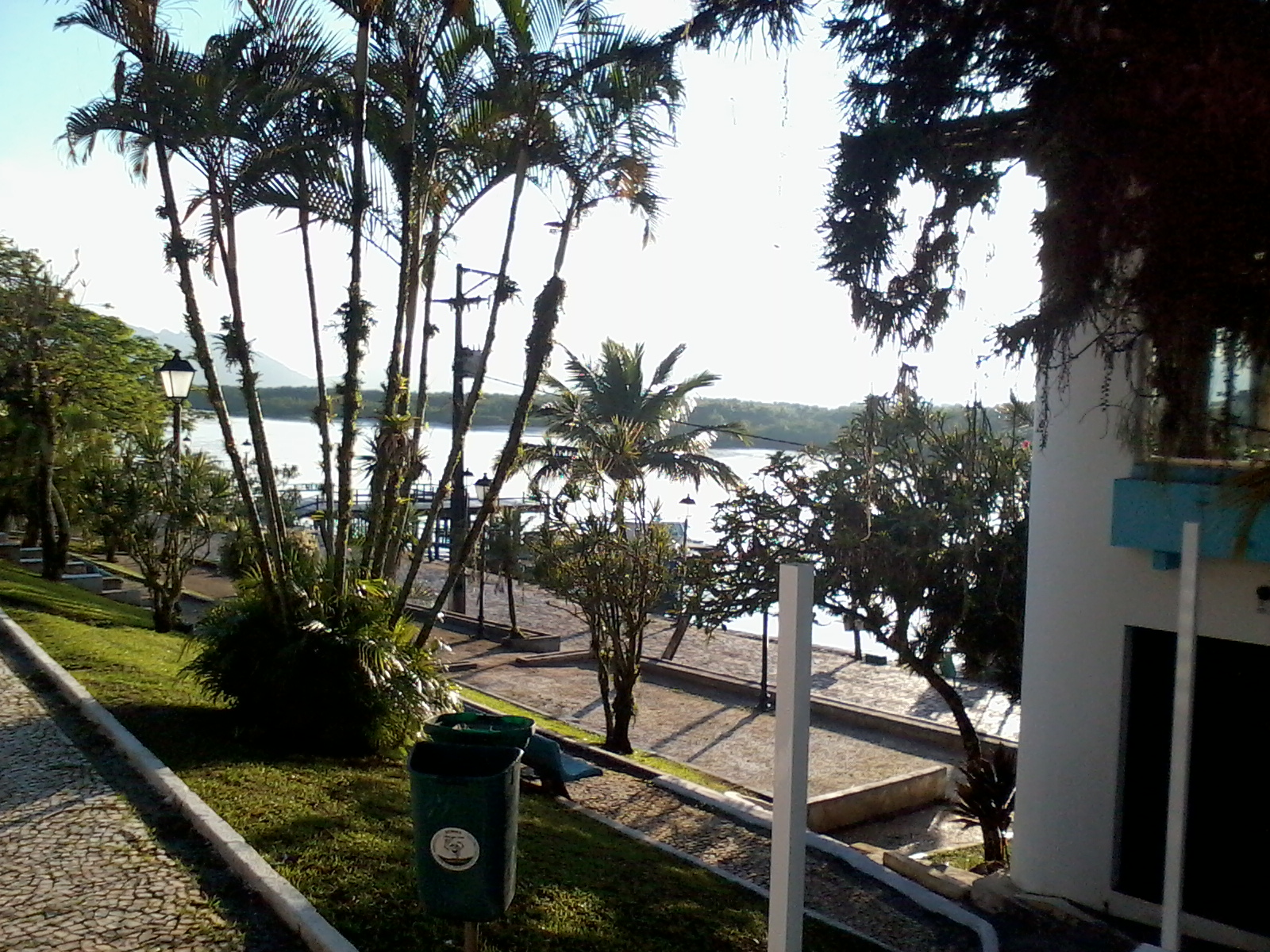
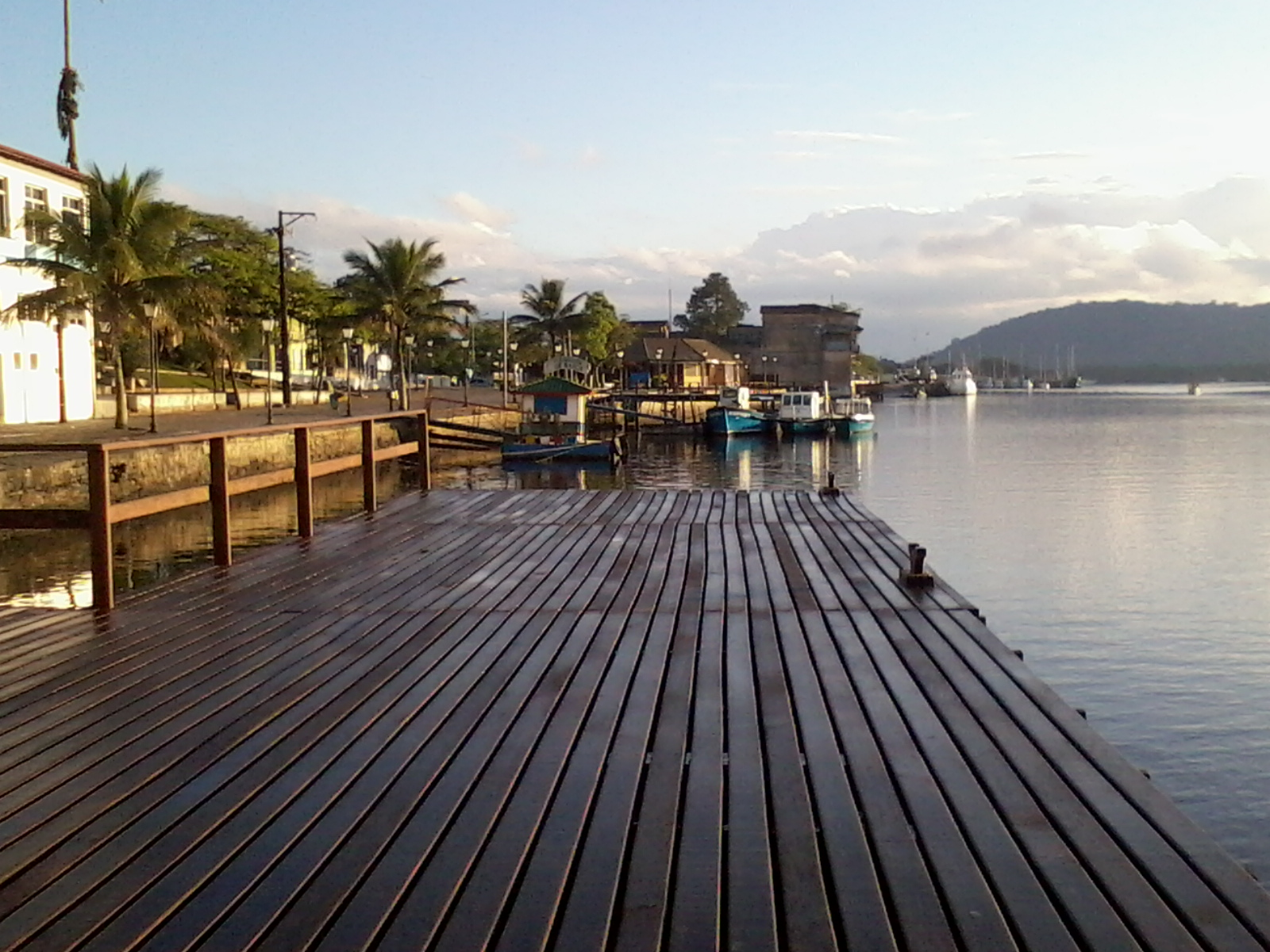
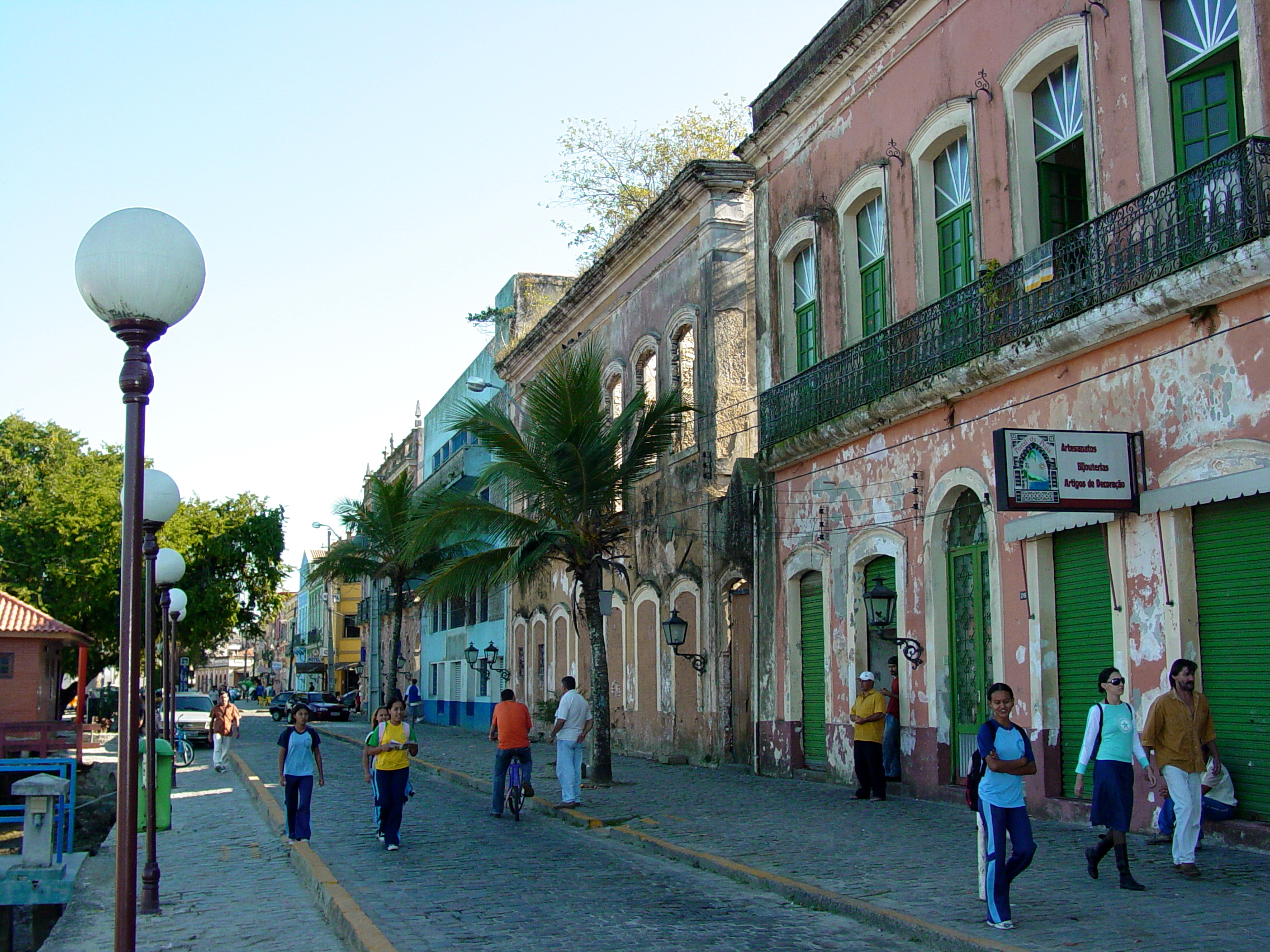
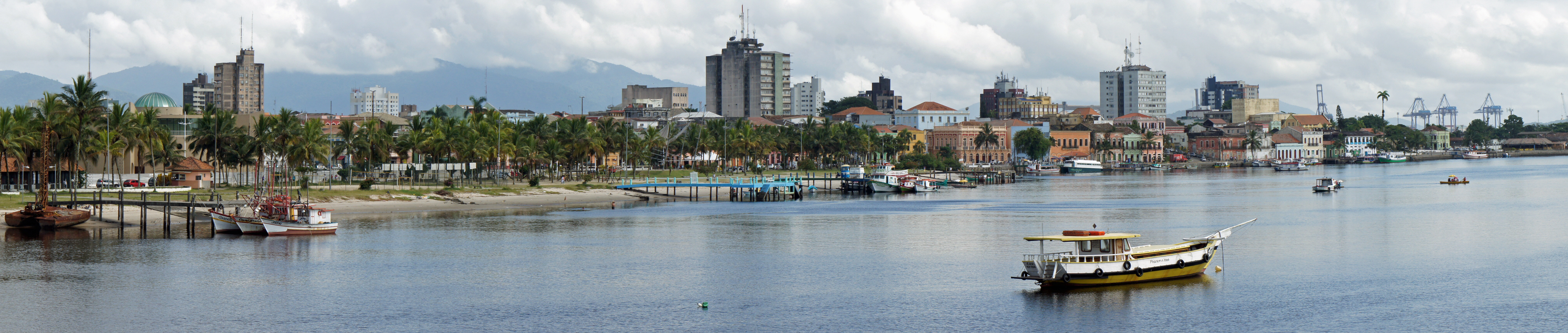

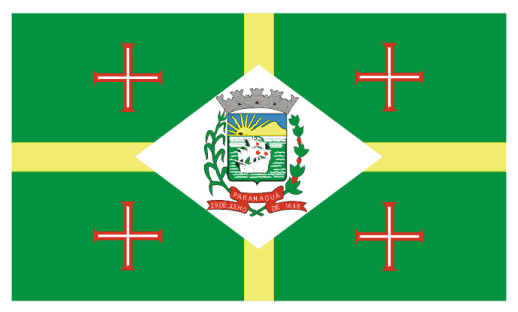
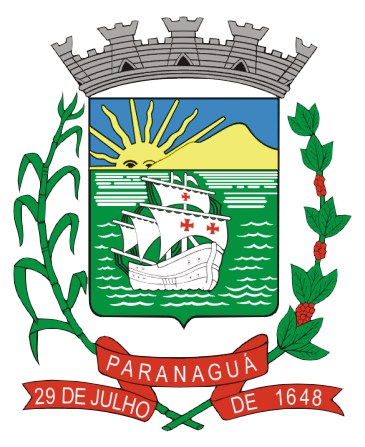
- Flag Coat of arms
- Nicknames: Berço da civilização paranaense Mãe do Paraná; Grande mar redondo
- Location of Paranaguá in Paraná

- Location in Brazil Paranaguá (South America)
- Coordinates: 25°31′15″S 48°30′34″W
- Country: Brazil
- Region: South
- State: Paraná
- Founded: July 29, 1648

Government
  - Mayor: Adriano Ramos (PODE) (2025 – 2028)

Area
  - Total: 826.674 km^{2} (319.181 sq mi)
- Elevation: 5 m (16 ft)

Population (2022 Census)
  - Total: 145,829
  - Estimate (2025): 150,104
  - Density: 176.404/km^{2} (456.886/sq mi)
- Demonym: Parnanguara
- Time zone: UTC−3 (BRT)
  - Summer (DST): UTC−2 (BRST)
- HDI (2010): 0.750 – high

Paranaguá (Tupi, 'Great Round Sea') is a city in the state of Paraná in Brazil. Founded in 1648, it is Paraná's oldest city. It is known for the Port of Paranaguá, which serves as both the sea link for Curitiba, 110 kilometres (68 mi) to the west and the capital of Paraná, and as one of the largest ports of Brazil.

As of 2022 Census, the city has an estimated population of 145,829 and a population density of 169.92 persons per km^{2}, making it the tenth most populated city in the state of Paraná. The total area of the city is 826.674 km^{2} (319.18 sq mi).

== History ==
=== Early settlement ===
Paranaguá was home to a sambaqui, or midden culture, for several millennia prior to the arrival of the Portuguese. Little is known of the population, which existed along the coast of Paraná. The area was later home to the Carijó people, an extinct subgroup of the Guaraní people. Portuguese explorers captured the Carijó for slave labor. Over time, the remaining Carijó intermarried with whites and African residents and formed the Caiçaras subgroup.

=== European settlement ===
The Paraná coastline was already known and inhabited by the Europeans as early as 1549. Settlements in the area were first noted by the German Hans Staden (c. 1525 – c. 1579), who was shipwrecked in the area of 1578. Staden described the existence of a small chapel dedicated to Nossa Senhora do Rosário (Our Lady of the Rosary). Diogo Unhate, notary (tabelião) of Captaincy of São Vicente, obtained the first land grant in Paraná in 1614. Unhate was granted the lands between the Ararapira River and Superagui rivers. Gabriel de Lara, who has passed into history as the "captain settler" arrived in Paranaguá in 1640. He erected the first pillory in the area on January 6, 1646, a symbol of the establishment of Portuguese civil and judicial authority in the region. Lara announced the discovery of gold in Paranaguá in the same year. The Portuguese established the municipality of Paranagua by royal charter on July 29, 1648, and the city has the distinction of being the first settlement formally founded in the state of Paraná.

== Port of Paranaguá ==
The economy of the city is driven by the deepwater Port of Paranaguá, which dates to the 16th century. The port was a point of entry for the settlement of the south of Brazil beginning early in the colonial period. It exports the largest volume of agricultural products of any of the ports of Brazil, notably of grain grown in the southern regions of the country. The port is also a major trade center of automobiles, fertilizer, lumber, paper, petroleum products, salt, soy beans, and sugar. It is administered by the Port Administration of Paranaguá and Antonina (Administração dos Portos de Paranaguá e Antonina), which was created by the state of Paraná in 1947.

In 2014, Paranaguá was the 7th largest exporting city, by value, in Brazil. The total value of exported goods that year were US$4.3B. The top three products exported by the municipality were soybeans (41% of total exports), poultry meat (22%), and soybean meal (14%).

== Geography ==
=== Conservation ===
The municipality contains 4% of the 199,587-hectare (493,190-acre) Guaratuba Environmental Protection Area, created in 1992. It holds 17% of the 34,179-hectare (84,460-acre) Bom Jesus Biological Reserve, a strictly protected conservation unit established in 2012. The municipality contains the Ilha do Mel State Park and the Ilha do Mel Ecological Station on the 2,760-hectare (6,800-acre) Ilha do Mel (English: Honey Island) at the mouth of Paranaguá Bay.

=== Climate ===
Paranaguá experiences a humid subtropical climate (Köppen: Cfa), next to northern limit of the category in the southern hemisphere (border of the coast of São Paulo/Paraná). The coastal location and the Brazil current molds a climate different from the usual one of the interior of the Paraná. The summers can be hot, mainly in the low altitudes and a little more interior. In warmer months, seemly the temperature is equal to or above 30 °C. The winter is very mild, in general it is as if it had only 3 seasons, when compared comparing with cities as Curitiba or Ponta Grossa with record temperatures of 5 °C lower. The central months of the year have temperatures averaging over 10 °C. Frost is not unknown, but is not expected in a normal winter. The updated normals give a value of precipitation above 2200 mm, which shows the rainy character of the city, although rain days are close to some drier climates. January to March are the wettest months with the advance of Atlantic tropical masses, and the months from June to August are the driest, due to the influence of the polar mass, but with relatively high precipitation. Sunshine hours are a bit low for the subtropics, being part of the effect of the large amount of water vapor on the airand the consequent cloudiness present.

Collaborating with the high humidity, the prevailing winds come from the east, especially in the ENE. Winds over 19 km/h are rare and more favorable in September. The months with clear skies are more common from June to August and the more cloudy months from January to February, especially with the advancement of air masses.

Climate data for Paranaguá (Valadares Island), elevation: 4.5 m, 1981-2010 normals, extremes 1961-present
Month	Jan	Feb	Mar	Apr	May	Jun	Jul	Aug	Sep	Oct	Nov	Dec	Year
Record high °C (°F)	39.2 (102.6)	40.0 (104.0)	38.3 (100.9)	37.6 (99.7)	33.9 (93.0)	33.8 (92.8)	34.8 (94.6)	37.7 (99.9)	40.6 (105.1)	38.2 (100.8)	38.4 (101.1)	39.6 (103.3)	40.6 (105.1)
Mean daily maximum °C (°F)	30.1 (86.2)	30.1 (86.2)	29.1 (84.4)	27.5 (81.5)	24.7 (76.5)	23.1 (73.6)	22.1 (71.8)	23.0 (73.4)	22.7 (72.9)	24.6 (76.3)	27.0 (80.6)	28.6 (83.5)	26.1 (78.9)
Daily mean °C (°F)	25.5 (77.9)	25.4 (77.7)	24.6 (76.3)	23.0 (73.4)	19.9 (67.8)	18.0 (64.4)	17.2 (63.0)	18.0 (64.4)	18.6 (65.5)	20.5 (68.9)	22.7 (72.9)	24.2 (75.6)	21.5 (70.7)
Mean daily minimum °C (°F)	22.0 (71.6)	22.1 (71.8)	21.5 (70.7)	19.8 (67.6)	16.8 (62.2)	14.8 (58.6)	13.8 (56.8)	14.5 (58.1)	15.7 (60.3)	17.7 (63.9)	19.4 (66.9)	20.9 (69.6)	18.2 (64.8)
Record low °C (°F)	11.9 (53.4)	10.9 (51.6)	12.7 (54.9)	5.0 (41.0)	2.6 (36.7)	0.3 (32.5)	−0.1 (31.8)	4.2 (39.6)	6.4 (43.5)	7.6 (45.7)	8.0 (46.4)	9.4 (48.9)	−0.1 (31.8)
Average precipitation mm (inches)	363.3 (14.30)	304.6 (11.99)	270.7 (10.66)	164.9 (6.49)	121.2 (4.77)	99.8 (3.93)	112.2 (4.42)	82.5 (3.25)	162.8 (6.41)	171.0 (6.73)	196.7 (7.74)	234.6 (9.24)	2,284.3 (89.93)
Average precipitation days (≥ 1 mm)	18	16	15	13	9	8	9	8	13	14	14	15	152
Average relative humidity (%)	85.5	85.7	86.4	87.1	87.1	87.5	87.5	87.1	87.5	86.0	84.0	84.0	86.3
Mean monthly sunshine hours	141.9	130.1	131.2	123.2	129.7	111.5	110.7	90.7	63.2	74.3	105.9	130.7	1,343.1
Source: BDMEP - INMET

Climate data for Paranaguá (Alto São Sebastião), elevation: 5 m, 1961-1990 normals
Month	Jan	Feb	Mar	Apr	May	Jun	Jul	Aug	Sep	Oct	Nov	Dec	Year
Mean daily maximum °C (°F)	28.7 (83.7)	28.0 (82.4)	27.9 (82.2)	25.9 (78.6)	23.9 (75.0)	22.0 (71.6)	20.6 (69.1)	21.8 (71.2)	19.8 (67.6)	22.0 (71.6)	22.3 (72.1)	24.7 (76.5)	24.0 (75.1)
Daily mean °C (°F)	24.1 (75.4)	23.4 (74.1)	23.6 (74.5)	21.3 (70.3)	19.0 (66.2)	17.2 (63.0)	16.2 (61.2)	17.2 (63.0)	16.1 (61.0)	17.6 (63.7)	18.6 (65.5)	20.7 (69.3)	19.6 (67.3)
Mean daily minimum °C (°F)	20.5 (68.9)	20.3 (68.5)	20.2 (68.4)	17.9 (64.2)	15.5 (59.9)	13.9 (57.0)	13.3 (55.9)	14.3 (57.7)	13.8 (56.8)	15.2 (59.4)	16.2 (61.2)	18.2 (64.8)	16.6 (61.9)
Average precipitation mm (inches)	284.9 (11.22)	251.5 (9.90)	279.8 (11.02)	146.3 (5.76)	117.0 (4.61)	103.0 (4.06)	92.0 (3.62)	76.9 (3.03)	115.1 (4.53)	143.7 (5.66)	141.5 (5.57)	180.5 (7.11)	1,932.2 (76.09)
Average relative humidity (%)	80.0	78.0	82.0	83.0	83.0	83.0	83.0	86.0	78.0	79.0	71.0	74.0	80.0
Mean monthly sunshine hours	142.7	133.4	131.3	135.0	142.4	129.9	127.4	109.1	73.0	91.7	107.4	126.0	1,449.3
Source: NOAA

== Panorama ==
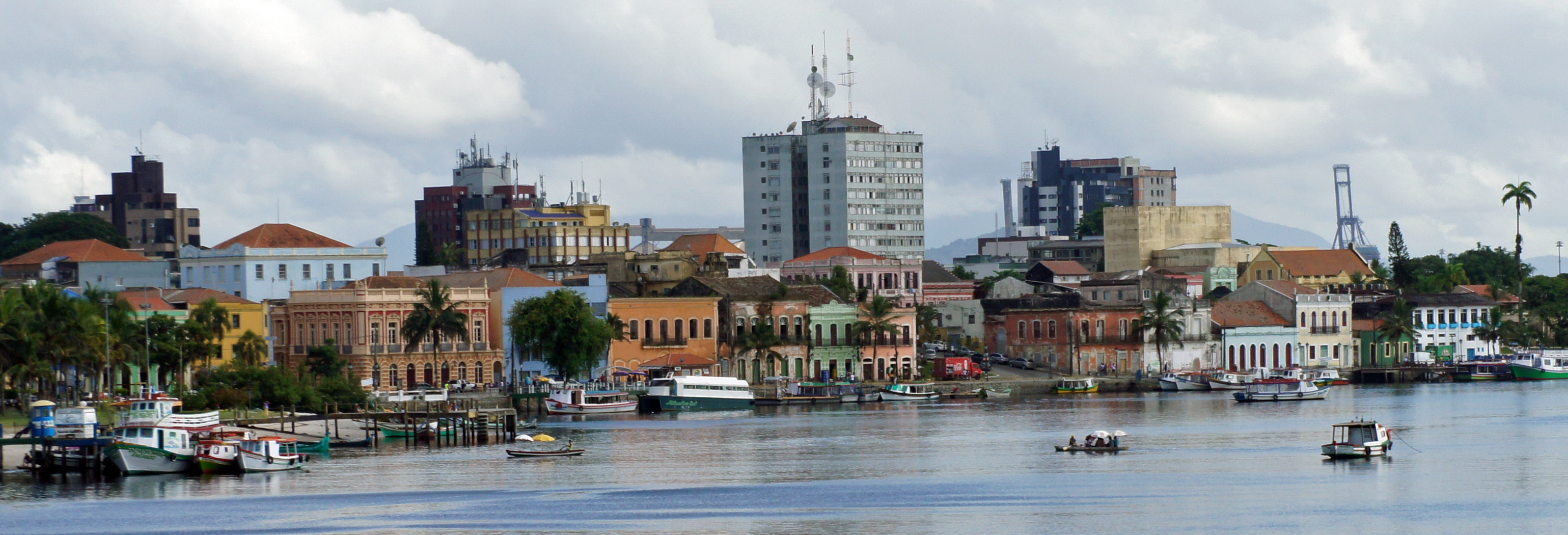
Panorama of old port of Paranaguá waterfront area

== Sports ==
Rio Branco Sport Club is the city football club. In 2006, the club disputed the Campeonato Brasileiro Série C. Estádio da Estradinha is the city stadium.

== Transportation ==
=== Air ===
Paranaguá is served by Paranaguá Airport, a small general aviation airport. The closest international airport to the city is Afonso Pena International Airport in São José dos Pinhais, which is directly adjacent to Curitiba.

== Consular representation ==
Uruguay has a Consulate in Paranaguá.

== Sister Cities ==
Paranaguá is sister cities with:

- Awaji, Hyōgo, Japan
- Mariupol, Donetsk Oblast, Ukraine

== Sources ==
- "Contextualização do Parque Estadual da Ilha do Mel" (PDF), Plano de Manejo - Parque Estadual Ilha do Mel (in Portuguese), STCP Engenharia de Projetos Ltda., 2011
- REBIO Bom Jesus (in Portuguese), ISA: Instituto Socioambiental
