= Grêmio Esportivo Catanduvense =

Association football club in Brazil

Catanduvense
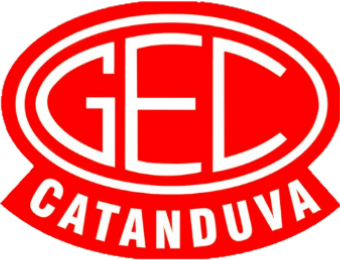
- Full name: Grêmio Esportivo Catanduvense
- Nickname(s): GEC
- Founded: February 5, 1970
- Dissolved: 1993
- Ground: Municipal Sílvio Salles
- Capacity: 14,800
Home colours	Away colours

Grêmio Esportivo Catanduvense, usually known simply as Catanduvense, or as GEC, was a Brazilian football club from Catanduva, São Paulo state.

== History ==
Grêmio Esportivo Catanduvense was founded on February 5, 1970, two years after another club from Catanduva, named Catanduva Esporte Clube, folded, adopting blue and white as its official colors. The club also inherited Cataduva EC'S spot in Campeonato Paulista Segunda Divisão, which was São Paulo state's third level.

The club won the Campeonato Paulista Second Level in 1974, but there was no promotion to the first level at the time.

Catanduvense competed in the Campeonato Paulista Second Level in 1988, and adopted red and white as its official colors, which were also Catanduva Esporte Clube's original colors. After a good campaign, the club finished as the runner-up, only behind Vanderlei Luxemburgo's Bragantino, the club was promoted to the following year's top level.

The club competed in the São Paulo state top level for the first time in 1989, finishing in the 8th position of its group. In the same year, Catanduvense disputed the Campeonato Brasileiro Série B, In the first stage, the club was in the same group of América (SP), Botafogo, Goiânia, Goiatuba and Uberlândia, and finished in the second position. In the second stage, the club was eliminated by Bragantino, after a 0–1 defeat at home in the first leg, and a 1–1 draw in Bragança Paulista. Catanduvense's final position in the competition was 27th.

The club was deeply in debt in 1993, and folded.

== Honours ==
- Campeonato Paulista Série A2
  - Winners (1): 1974

== Stadium ==
Catanduvense's home matches were usually played at Municipal Sílvio Salles stadium, which has a maximum capacity of 14,800 people and was built in 1988.

== Memorable matches ==
Home club	Visitor	Score	Stadium	City	Competition	Date	Reference
Santos	Catanduvense	1–2	Estádio Vila Belmiro	Santos	Campeonato Paulista	February 26, 1989	
Catanduvense	Corinthians	2–1	Estádio Municipal Sílvio Salles	Catanduva	Campeonato Paulista	April 9, 1989	
Catanduvense	Botafogo (SP)	1–0	Estádio Municipal Sílvio Salles	Catanduva	Campeonato Brasileiro Série B	September 9, 1989	
