= 1966 Copa Libertadores finals =

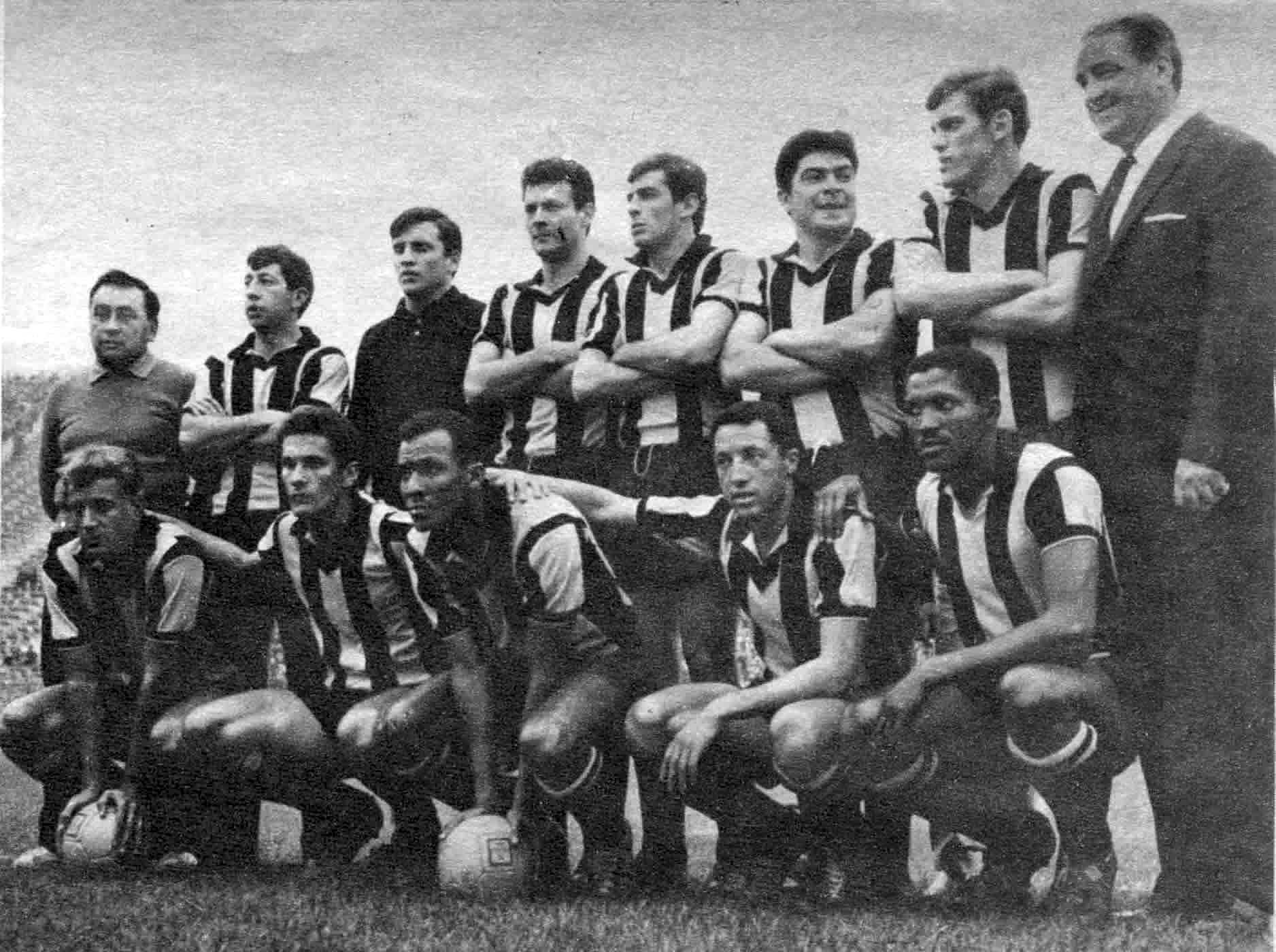
- Peñarol, champions
- Event: 1966 Copa Libertadores
Peñarol	River Plate
(Uruguay)	(Argentina)
- 2–2 on points Peñarol won after a play-off

First leg
Peñarol	River Plate
2	0
- Date: 12 May 1966
- Venue: Estadio Centenario, Montevideo
- Referee: Roberto Goicoechea (Argentina)
- Attendance: 49,000

Second leg
River Plate	Peñarol
3	2
- Date: 18 May 1966
- Venue: Estadio Antonio V. Liberti, Buenos Aires
- Referee: José M. Codesal (Uruguay)
- Attendance: 60,000

Play-off
River Plate	Peñarol
2	4
- After extra time
- Date: 20 May 1966
- Venue: Estadio Nacional, Santiago
- Referee: Claudio Vicuña (Chile)
- Attendance: 39,000

The 1966 Copa Libertadores finals were the two-legged final that decided the winner of the 1966 Copa Libertadores, the 7th edition of the Copa Libertadores de América, South America's premier international club football tournament organized by CONMEBOL.

The finals were contested in two-legged home-and-away format between Uruguayan team Peñarol and Argentine team Club Atlético River Plate. The first leg was hosted by Peñarol at Estadio Centenario in Montevideo on 12 May 1966, while the second leg was hosted by River Plate at Estadio Monumental in Buenos Aires on 18 May 1966.

After both teams won one match each, a third game was hosted at Estadio Nacional in Santiago de Chile on 20 May 1966. Peñarol beat River by 4–2 therefore winning their 3rd. Copa Libertadores title.

== Qualified teams ==
Team	Previous finals appearances (bold indicates winners)
(Uruguay) Peñarol	**1960**, **1961**, 1962, 1965
(Argentina) River Plate	None

== Stadiums ==
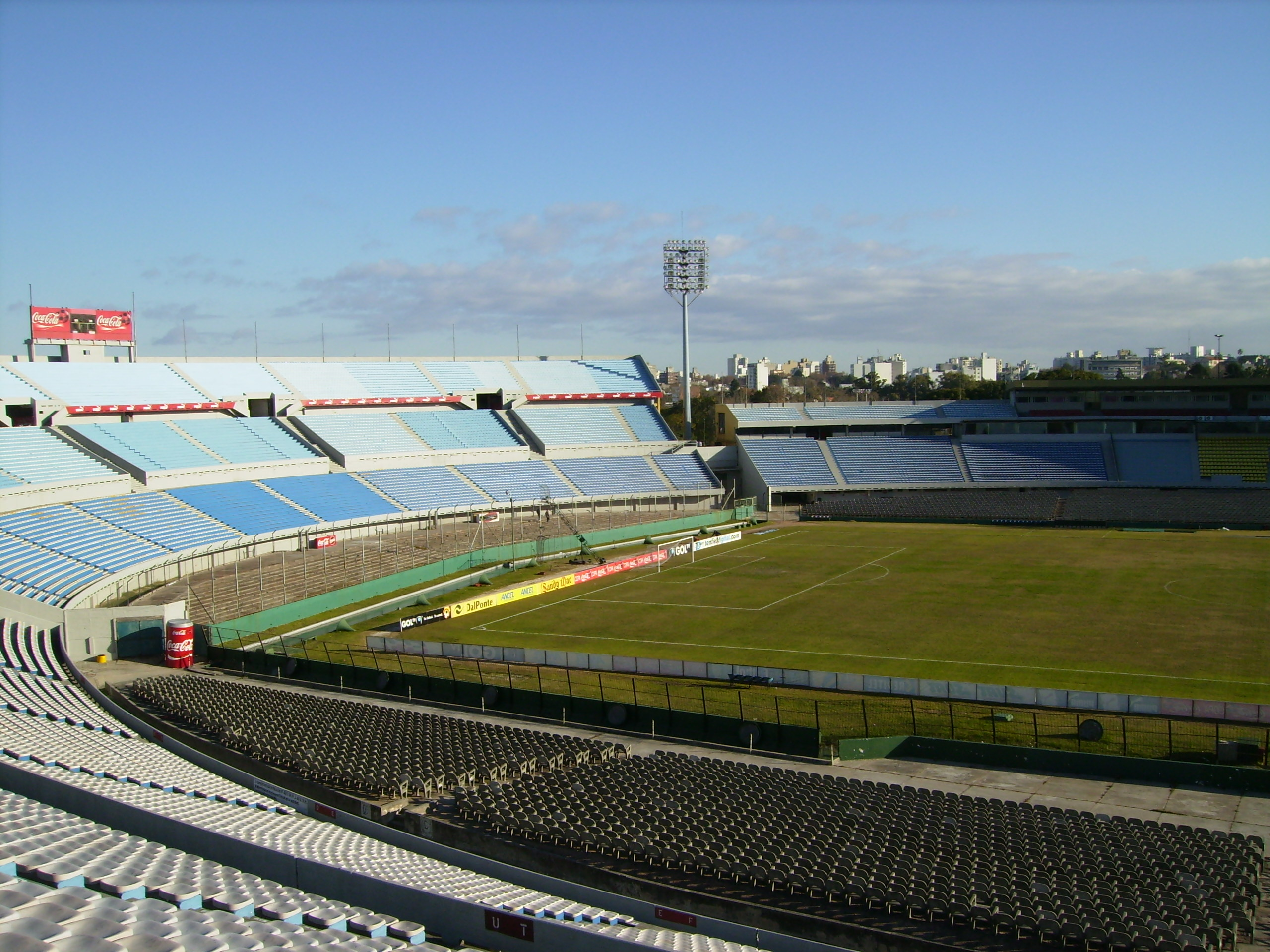
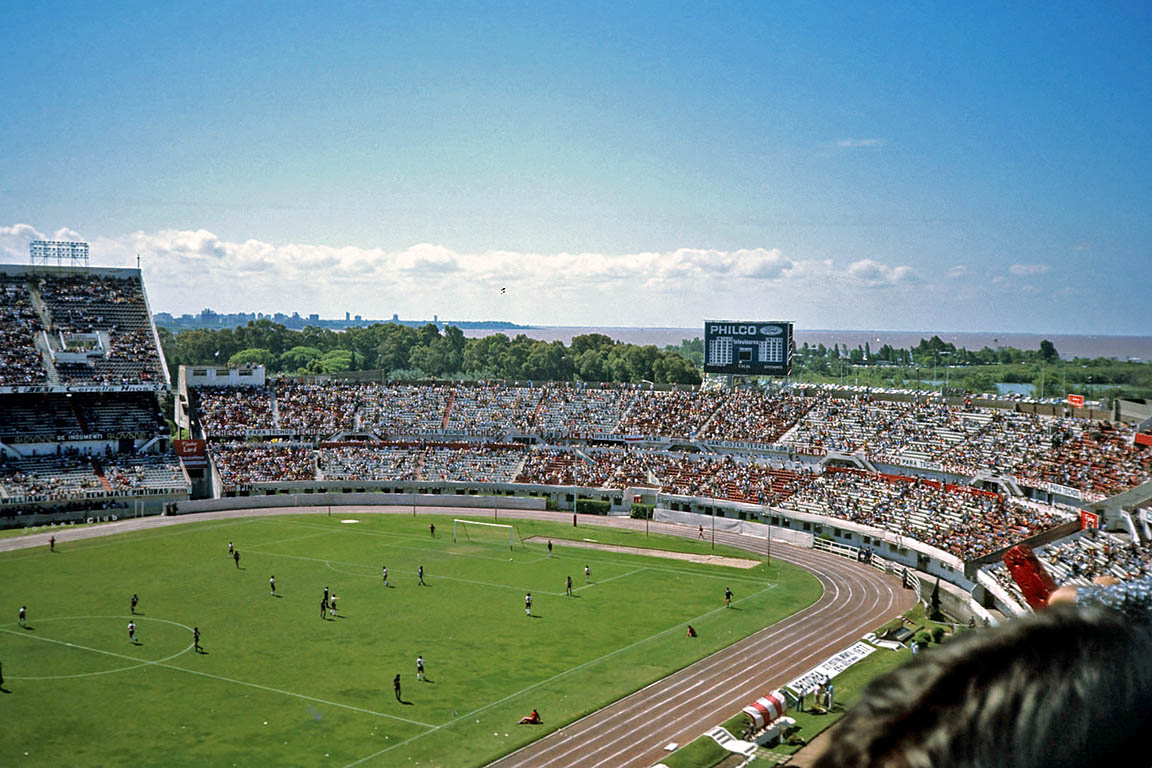
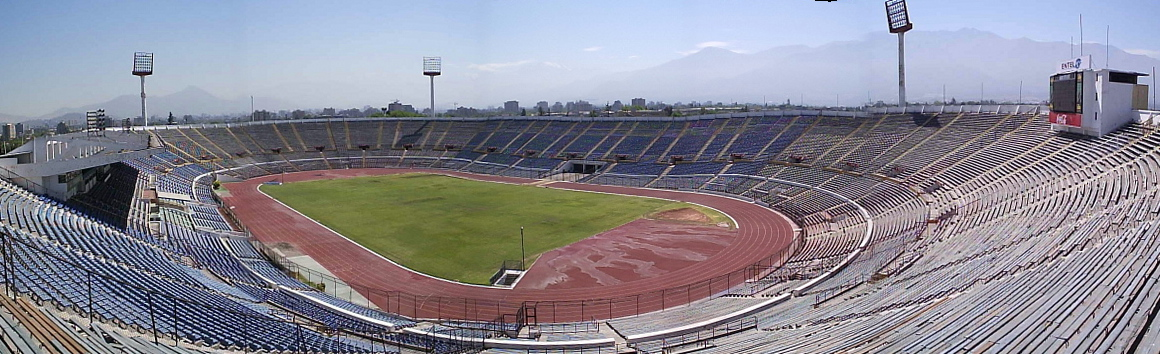
Estadio Centenario of Uruguay, Estadio Monumental of Buenos Aires and Estadio Nacional de Santiago were the venues for the three matches (first and second leg plus playoff, respectively) of the finals.

== Match details ==
=== First leg ===
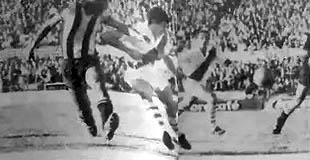
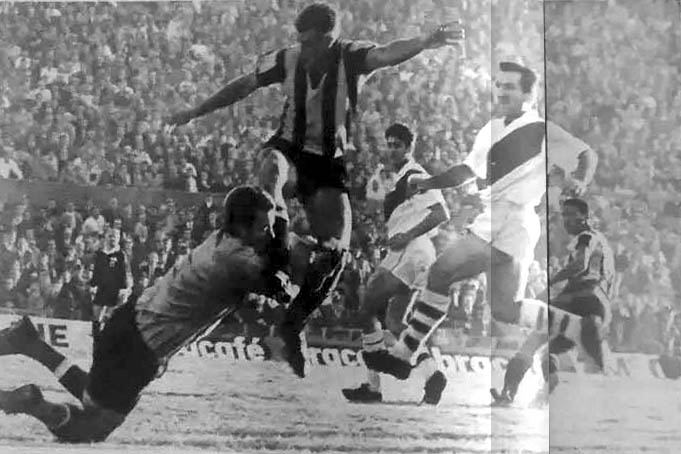
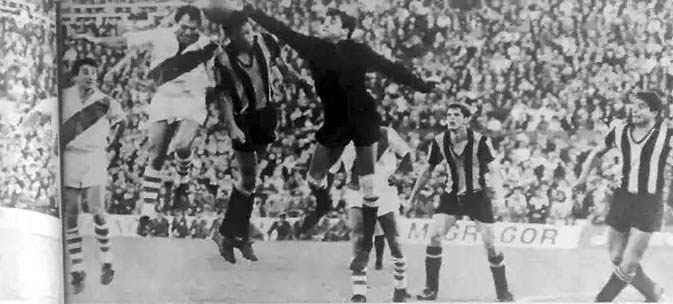
Some moments of the first match, held in Montevideo
1966 Copa Libertadores finals
12 May 1966
First leg

Peñarol (Uruguay)	2–0	(Argentina) River Plate
Abbadie 75'; Joya 85'

Estadio Centenario, Montevideo
Attendance: 49,000
Referee: Goicoechea (Argentina)

**Peñarol**	**River Plate**

GK	(Uruguay) Ladislao Mazurkiewicz
DF	(Uruguay) Pablo Forlán
DF	(Paraguay) Juan Lezcano
DF	(Uruguay) Nelson Díaz
DF	(Uruguay) Omar Caetano
MF	(Uruguay) Néstor Gonçalves
MF	(Uruguay) Julio Abbadie
FW	(Uruguay) Pedro Rocha
FW	(Uruguay) Héctor Silva
FW	(Uruguay) Julio César Cortés
FW	(Peru) Juan Joya
Manager:
(Uruguay) Roque Máspoli

GK	(Argentina) Amadeo Carrizo
DF	(Argentina) Alberto Sainz
DF	(Argentina) J. Carlos Guzmán
DF	(Uruguay) Roberto Matosas
DF	(Argentina) Abel Vieytez
MF	(Argentina) Juan Carlos Sarnari
MF	(Argentina) Daniel Bayo
MF	(Peru) Miguel Loayza	Substituted off
FW	(Uruguay) Luis Cubilla
FW	(Argentina) Daniel Onega
FW	(Argentina) Jorge Solari
Substitutes:
MF	(Argentina) Ermindo Onega	Substituted on
Manager:
(Argentina) Renato Cesarini

=== Second leg ===
18 May 1966
Second leg

River Plate (Argentina)	3–2	(Uruguay) Peñarol
D. Onega 38'; E. Onega 73'; Sarnari 52'		Pedro Rocha 32'; Alberto Spencer 50'

River Plate, Buenos Aires
Attendance: 60,000
Referee: José M. Codesal (Uruguay)

**River Plate**	**Peñarol**

GK	1	(Argentina) Amadeo Carrizo
DF	4	(Argentina) Alberto Sainz
DF	2	(Argentina) J. Carlos Guzmán
DF	6	(Uruguay) Roberto Matosas
DF	3	(Argentina) Abel Vieytez
MF	8	(Argentina) Jorge Solari
MF	5	(Argentina) Juan Carlos Sarnari
MF	10	(Argentina) Ermindo Onega
FW	7	(Uruguay) Luis Cubilla
FW	9	(Argentina) Daniel Onega	Substituted off
FW	11	(Argentina) Jorge Solari
Substitutes:
FW		(Argentina) Juan C. Lallana	Substituted on
Manager:
(Argentina) Renato Cesarini

GK	1	(Uruguay) Ladislao Mazurkiewicz
DF	4	(Uruguay) Pablo Forlán
DF	2	(Paraguay) Juan Lezcano
DF	3	(Uruguay) Nelson Díaz
DF	6	(Uruguay) Omar Caetano
MF	5	(Uruguay) Néstor Gonçalves
MF	7	(Uruguay) Julio Abbadie
FW	8	(Uruguay) Pedro Rocha
FW	9	(Ecuador) Alberto Spencer
FW	10	(Uruguay) Julio César Cortés
FW	11	(Peru) Juan Joya
Manager:
(Uruguay) Roque Máspoli

=== Playoff ===
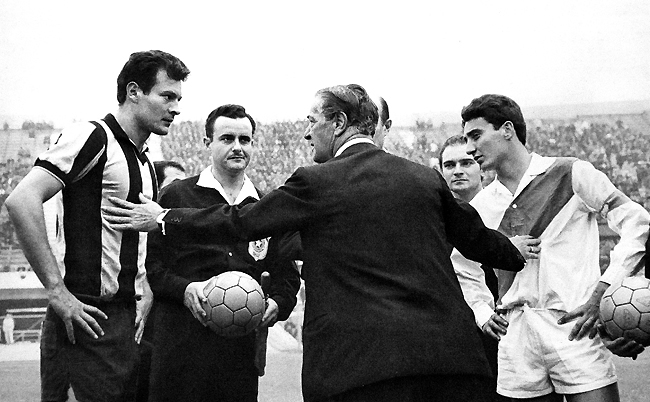
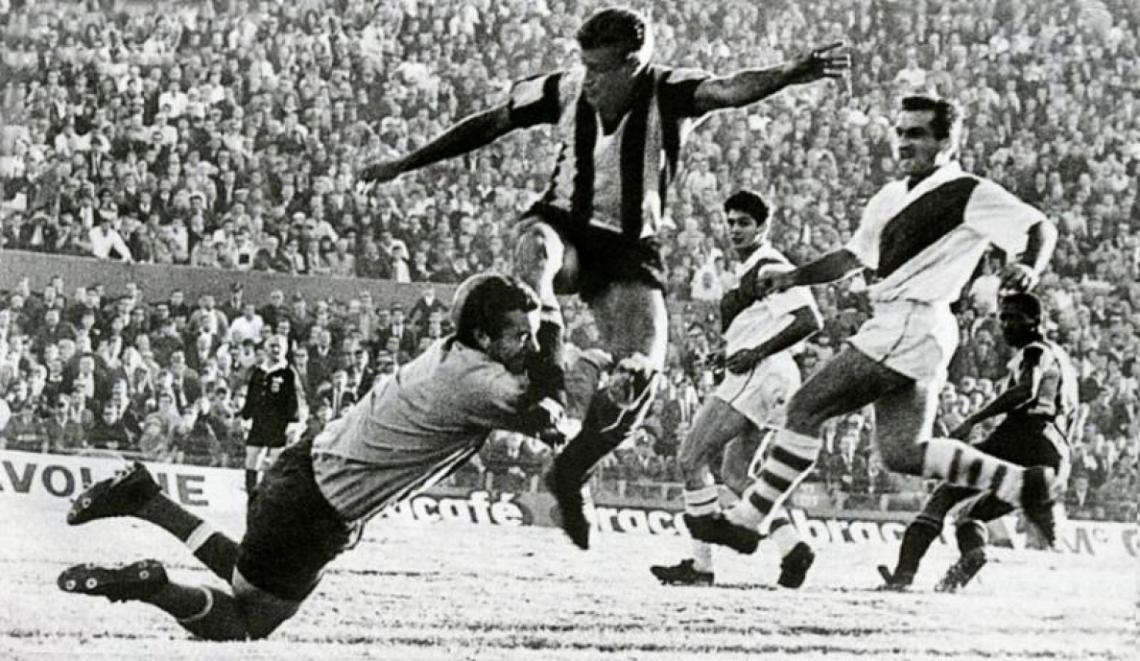
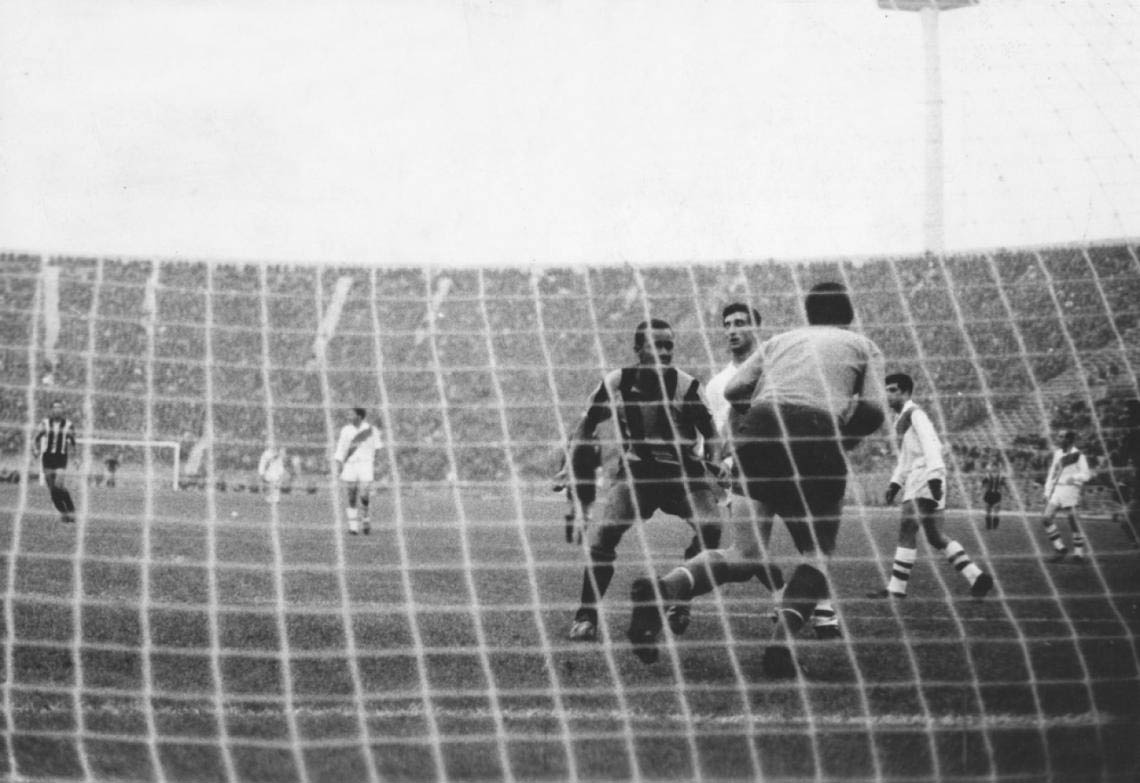
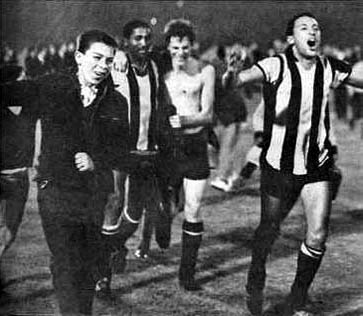
Some moments of the playoff in Santiago, won by Peñarol
20 May 1966
Playoff

Peñarol (Uruguay)	4–2 (a.e.t.)	(Argentina) River Plate
Spencer 67' 103'; Abbadie 72'; Rocha 109'	Report	D. Onega 28'; Solari 42'

Estadio Nacional, Santiago de Chile
Attendance: 39,000
Referee: Claudio Vicuña (Chile)

**Peñarol**	**River Plate**

GK	1	(Uruguay) Ladislao Mazurkiewicz
DF	4	(Uruguay) Pablo Forlán
DF	2	(Paraguay) Juan Lezcano
DF	3	(Uruguay) Nelson Díaz	Substituted off
DF	6	(Uruguay) Omar Caetano
MF	5	(Uruguay) Néstor Gonçalves
MF	7	(Uruguay) Julio Abbadie
FW	8	(Uruguay) Julio César Cortés
FW	9	(Ecuador) Alberto Spencer
FW	10	(Uruguay) Pedro Rocha
FW	11	(Peru) Juan Joya
Substitutes:
DF		(Uruguay) Tabaré González	Substituted on
Manager:
(Uruguay) Roque Máspoli

GK	1	(Argentina) Amadeo Carrizo
DF	4	(Argentina) Alberto Sainz	Substituted off
DF	2	(Argentina) Grispo
DF		(Uruguay) Roberto Matosas
DF	3	(Argentina) Abel Vieytez
MF		(Argentina) Jorge Solari
MF		(Argentina) Juan Carlos Sarnari
MF		(Argentina) Ermindo Onega
FW	7	(Uruguay) Luis Cubilla
FW		(Argentina) Daniel Onega
FW	11	(Argentina) Oscar Más
Substitutes:
FW		(Argentina) Juan C. Lallana	Substituted on
Manager:
(Argentina) Renato Cesarini

== Aftermath ==
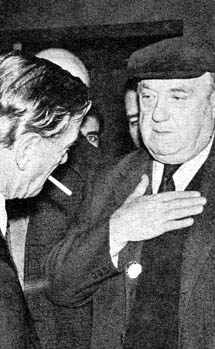
Renato Cesarini (left) and president Antonio Liberti after the match. Liberti made Cesarini and goalkeeper Amadeo Carrizo responsibles for the defeat in the playoff

The defeat in the playoff v. Peñarol (by 4–2 after River won 2–0 at the end of the first half) was quite a shock for River Plate. The team returned to Argentina to play the domestic league match v. Banfield. During the match, Banfield supporters threw a chicken (with its body painted a red sash) into the field to make fun of River Plate players.

Since that time, and up to present days, the nickname gallinas has remained to refer to River Plate when the team loses a match that could have won.

Other versions refer to a lack of commitment of some River Plate players, stating that manager Renato Cesarini would have shout "I was betrayed" (by the players) after the match.

When the second half began, we changed. River Plate was winning very easily. Because of that, we thought that we needed to change the match surrounding rather strategic moves. We were desperate and therefore we drew from illicit resources, that's true. We even said them that in case they won, we would look for them to their changing room and hotel. It became a climate of war from which we took a great advantage, given the pasiveness of River players.

— Peñarol player Néstor Gonçalves in an interview for El Gráfico, some years after the final

At the end of the match, River Plate president Antonio Liberti blamed on Cesarini for the defeat, speaking directly to him: "I think this match was not won by Peñarol. (On the contrary), I think it was River that lost this match. In my opinion, the defeat began from the bench, with the substitutions made. The match was lost by Renato Cesarini". After listening to Liberti, Cesarini agreed with him.

Nevertheless, Liberti held goalkeeper Amadeo Carrizo responsible for the defeat with harsh words to refer to him. Liberti said: "the other responsible is that man, Carrizo... It's easy to mock the rival when conditions are favorable; but someone must know how to be brave in adverse conditions... this man was born well starred. He's the untouchable. I would like to know when he won a responsibility match in 20 years playing for the club... since he stopped that ball with his chest, the match changed... a serious players should not do silly things (Note: The exact word used by Liberti was "gansadas" (in Spanish)). To be a man, other things are necessary..."
