= Leão do Mar =

Leão do Mar (Portuguese pronunciation: [leˈɐ̃w du ˈmaʁ], "Lion of the Sea") is a hymn of Santos FC, commissioned in 1955 to celebrate the club's second Campeonato Paulista – their first in 20 years. The lyrics were written by Mangeri Neto and the music was composed by Mangeri Sobrinho.

Although not officially recognised, Leão do Mar is highly regarded as the de facto anthem of Santos, played during television coverages, goals and title commemorations. Players and fans alike have publicly pushed for the song to be recognised by the club.

== Lyrics ==
Santos, Santos, gol! (Santos, Santos, goal!)

Agora quem dá bola é o Santos, (Now Santos is on the ball,)
O Santos é o novo campeão, (Santos is the new champion,)
Glorioso alvinegro praiano, (Glorious black-and-white from the beaches,)
Campeão absoluto desse ano! (This year's absolute champion!)

Agora quem dá bola é o Santos, (Now Santos is on the ball,)
O Santos é o novo campeão, (Santos is the new champion,)
Glorioso alvinegro praiano, (Glorious black-and-white from the beaches,)
Campeão absoluto desse ano! (This year's absolute champion!)

Santos! Santos sempre Santos, (Santos! Santos, always Santos,)
Dentro ou fora do alçapão, (Be it home or away,)
Jogue o que jogar, (However well you play,)
És o leão do mar! (You're the lion of the sea!)
Salve o nosso campeão! (Hail to our champion!)

Agora quem dá bola é o Santos, (Now Santos is on the ball,)
O Santos é o novo campeão, (Santos is the new champion,)
Glorioso alvinegro praiano, (Glorious black-and-white from the beaches,)
Campeão absoluto desse ano! (This year's absolute champion!)

Santos! Santos sempre Santos, (Santos! Santos, always Santos,)
Dentro ou fora do alçapão, (Be it home or away,)
Jogue o que jogar, (However well you play,)
És o leão do mar! (You're the lion of the sea!)
Salve o nosso campeão! (Hail to our champion!)
