= Copa Confraternidad Iberoamericana =

- Organiser(s): (Argentina) C.A. River Plate
- Founded: 1964
- Abolished: 1965; 61 years ago
- Region: Argentina
- Teams: 4
- Last champions: (Brazil) Santos (1965)
- Most championships: (Argentina) River Plate; (Brazil) Santos; (1 title each)

The Copa Confraternidad Iberoamericana (English: Ibero-American Fellowship Cup), also known as Copa Iberoamericana, was a friendly football competition organised by Argentine Club Atlético River Plate.

The competition only lasted two editions, in 1964 and 1965. Four clubs took part of each competition, 2 of Argentina, 1 of Brazil and one of Spain, with all the matches played at Estadio Monumental, home venue of River Plate.

The first edition was played under a single round-robin tournament. The team with most points earned at the end of the tournament was crowned champion, being River Plate the winner. On the contrary, the second edition was played as a single-elimination tournament, with Brazilian side Santos winning the title after defeating River Plate in the final.

Real Madrid participated in the 1965 edition as part of their tour over the Americas.

== Results ==
Ed.	Year	Winner	Score	Runner-up	Venue	City
1	1964	(Argentina) River Plate	– (Note: Round-robin format, won on points.)	(Brazil) Botafogo	Monumental	Buenos Aires
2	1965	(Brazil) Santos	2–1	(Argentina) River Plate	Monumental	Buenos Aires
