= 1965 Copa Confraternidad Iberoamericana =

1965 Copa de Confraternidad Iberoamericana
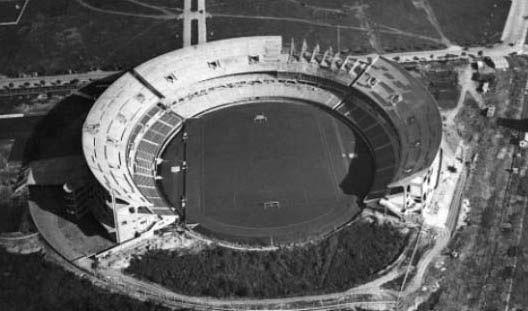
- Estadio Monumental hosted all the matches

Tournament details
- Country: Argentina
- Venue: Estadio Monumental
- Dates: 8–12 August
- Teams: 4

Final positions
- Champions: (Brazil) Santos
- Runners-up: (Argentina) River Plate
- Third place: (Spain) Real Madrid
- Fourth place: (Argentina) Boca Juniors

Tournament statistics
- Matches played: 4
- Goals scored: 12 (3 per match)
- Top goal scorer: (Brazil) Coutinho (3 goals)

The 1965 Copa de Confraternidad Iberoamericana was the second and last edition of the Copa Confraternidad Iberoamericana, a friendly international tournament organised by Argentine club River Plate. It was held in Buenos Aires in August 1965.

Four clubs took part in the competition, River Plate and Boca Juniors of Argentina, Santos and Real Madrid, which were touring the Americas. Played under a single-elimination format, Santos won the cup after beating River Plate in the final.

== Teams ==
Nat.	Club	Last honours
(Argentina)	River Plate	Host team
(Argentina)	Boca Juniors	1965 Primera División champions
(Brazil)	Santos	1965 Série A champions
(Spain)	Real Madrid	1964–65 La Liga champions

== Bracket ==
First round
(Argentina) River Plate	0
(Spain) Real Madrid	0
(Argentina) Boca Juniors	1
(Brazil) Santos	4

Final
(Argentina) River Plate	1
(Brazil) Santos	2
Third place
(Argentina) Boca Juniors	1
(Spain) Real Madrid	3

== Results ==
=== First round ===
8 August

River Plate (Argentina)	0–0 (5–3 c) (Note: The penalty shoot-out had not been instituted to break ties by then, therefore River Plate qualified to the next stage on most corner kicks awarded.)	(Spain) Real Madrid
	Report

Monumental, Buenos Aires
Referee: Aurelio Bossolino (ARG)

8 August

Boca Juniors (Argentina)	1–4	(Brazil) Santos
Menéndez 73'	Report	Pelé 10', 27'; Coutinho 30', 89'

Monumental, Buenos Aires
Referee: Roberto Goicoechea (ARG)

=== Third place ===
12 August

Boca Juniors (Argentina)	1–3	(Spain) Real Madrid
A.H. Rojas 73'	Report	Grosso 38'; Puskás 80', 87'

Monumental, Buenos Aires
Referee: Miguel Comesaña (ARG)

=== Final ===
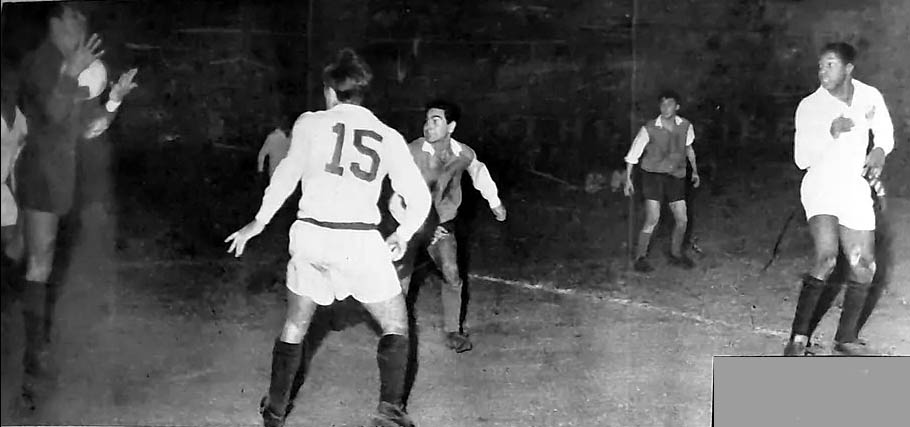
A moment of the match between River (in red shirt) v Santos. Brazilian goalkeeper Gilmar (at left) holding the ball

12 August

River Plate (Argentina)	1–2	(Brazil) Santos
Sarnari 8'	Report	Coutinho 10'; Dorval 22'

Monumental, Buenos Aires
Referee: Ángel Coerezza (ARG)

Team details

River Plate
Santos

GK	(Argentina) Hugo Gatti
DF	(Argentina) Mario Bonczuk	(substituted off) a'
DF	(Argentina) Eduardo Grispo
MF	(Argentina) Alberto Sainz
MF	(Argentina) Vladislao Cap
MF	(Uruguay) Roberto Matosas
FW	(Argentina) Jorge Solari	(substituted off) b'
FW	(Brazil) Delém
FW	(Argentina) Juan Carlos Sarnari
FW	(Argentina) Juan Carlos Lallana
FW	(Uruguay) Luis Cubilla
Substitutes:
DF	(Argentina) José Minore	(substituted in) a'
FW	(Argentina) Ricardo Montivero	(substituted in) b'
Manager:
(Argentina) Renato Cesarini

GK	1	(Brazil) Gilmar
DF		(Brazil) Mauro		(substituted off) a'
DF		(Brazil) Orlando
DF		(Brazil) Geraldino
MF		(Brazil) Carlos Albeto
MF		(Brazil) Zito	Sent off (straight red)
FW	7	(Brazil) Dorval		(substituted off) b'
FW	8	(Brazil) Lima
FW	9	(Brazil) Coutinho
FW	10	(Brazil) Pelé
FW	11	(Brazil) Abel		(substituted off) c'
Substitutes:
DF		Joel		(substituted in) a'
FW		Toninho		(substituted in) b'
FW		Pepe		(substituted in) c'
Manager:
(Brazil) Lula

== Champion ==
1965 Copa Confraternidad
Iberoamericana winners
(Brazil)
Santos
First title

== Performance by club ==
Club	Pld	W	D	L	Gf	Ga
(Brazil) Santos	2	2	0	0	6	2
(Argentina) River Plate	2	0	1	1	1	2
(Spain) Real Madrid	2	1	1	0	3	1
(Argentina) Boca Juniors	2	0	0	2	2	7
