= Supporters of Santos FC =

Santos FC is a football club based in Santos, that competes in the Campeonato Paulista, São Paulo's state league, and the Campeonato Brasileiro Série A or Brasileirão, Brazil's national league. The club was founded in 1912 by the initiative of three sports enthusiasts from Santos by the names of Raimundo Marques, Mário Ferraz de Campos, and Argemiro de Souza Júnior, and played its first friendly match on June 23, 1914. Initially Santos played against other local clubs in the city and state championships, but in 1959 the club became one of the founding members of the Taça Brasil, Brazil's first truly national league. Up until 2023, Santos was one of only five clubs never to have been relegated from the top level of Brazilian football, the others being São Paulo, Flamengo, Internacional and Cruzeiro.

The supporters of Santos have played an important part in the formation of the club's cultural association with Joga Bonito (English: The Beautiful Game) in football culture during the club's 99-year existence, numbering at 18,491 in 2009. Os Santásticos, considered by some the best club team of all times, won a total of 22 titles during that decade, including two Copa Libertadores, the most prestigious laurel in South American football.

The core strength of Santos's global brand is often attributed to Lula's success in leading Os Santasticos, which drew worldwide acclaim. This attention often generates greater interest in on-the-field activities as well as off-the-field, with the popularity of the club and brand spanning five continents across the globe. Santos is one of Brazil's most economically powerful clubs. It is one of Brazil's richest football club in terms of revenue, with an annual turnover of US$45.1m (€31.5m), and one of the most valuable clubs, worth over $86.7m (€60.6m) in 2011. That same year, Santos' squad became the most valued in South America, being worth over €82m. The flamboyant, attacking style of play adopted by this team (in contrast to the physical-minded approach favoured by European, Uruguayan and Argentinian teams of the era) was a constant, world-wide exhibition that saw Santos travel in over 50 countries at every continent (except Antarctica). The club's focus on commercial and sporting success brought significant profits in an industry often characterised by chronic losses. The strength of the Santos' brand was bolstered by its FIFA World Cup winners, especially Pelé.

== Torcidas ==
Torcidas organizadas are formal (or informal) associations of football fans in Brazil in the same vein as Argentine hinchadas, English supporters groups and European ultras. The name is based on the verb torcer, which means "to root for" but also "to wring" and "to turn". The supposition is that the behaviour of the fans present at the stadium could help the team gather strength to beat the opponent. In the beginning, and until the 1960s, torcidas organizadas were informal associations of fans who gathered to buy fireworks, cloth for large flags, and other stuff to be used during celebrations. Later, such associations became permanent and were formalised legally as non-profit recreational associations, still with the primary goal of providing a better spectacle at the stadium and surroundings.

In the beginning the torcida organizada movement was fragmentary, but would later consolidate in larger bodies or leagues. Some torcidas would open branches throughout the country to support their teams playing away, given the national range of their supporters. Many of Santos' firms were created through such methods. Although the club has had many supporter groups, only three has carried more than 1,000 member each: Força Jovem, Jovem New York and Torcida Jovem, the latter being the most famous Santista supporters.

=== Força Jovem ===
Força Jovem was founded on April 11, 1977 on the initiative of some former members of the Torcida Jovem, principally Wilson Xavier Buriu. After a game played in Vila Belmiro, the fans who decided to set up the new movement painted a few tracks with the name of Força Jovem. Today, Força Jovem is considered the third largest crowd of the club, with its profile increased by the fact that in recent times the firm have cooperated extensively with the military police against hooligans and stadium violence. In its beginning, the new firm had generated controversy, an innovator of it being the firm's colors. Because the uniform of Santos FC was generally a combination of black and white, other firms openly questioned Força Jovem heavy usage of black. Since then, is what draws the most attention in the crowd, black symbolizing the Alvinegro Praiano. The club has 12 tracks, 2 flag holders and a battalion with more than 20 instruments. The current president is Pedro. The firm's headquarters are located in the city of Santos at Rua Benedito Ernesto Guimarães, bairro Marapé with the building being named after its founder. The group currently has over 2,500 members.

=== Jovem New York ===
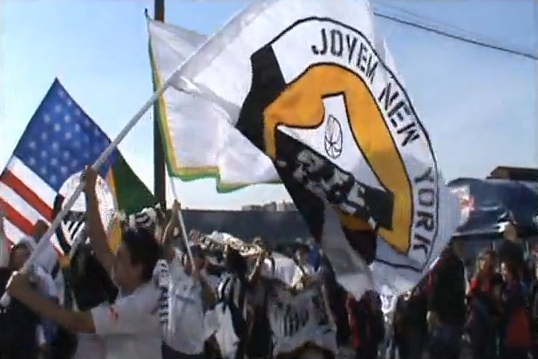
Força Jovem

Jovem New York was founded in 1984 by Brazilian cultural director and percussionist Vavá Maravilha and Adalberto "Alemão". Adalberto is one of the primary founders of the initial, "Torcida Jovem do Santos" of Brazil. The two fans decided to represent the most famous soccer fan organization of Brazil, Torcida Jovem, and consequently the team of the century, Santos FC, here in the United States. Jovem New York became a pioneer among all of the Brazilian Torcida organizations forged outside of Brazil. With much drive, dedication, dignity and passion, these two young fans decided to represent. The most famous soccer fans organization of Brazil "Torcida Jovem do Santos" and consequently the team of the century, "Santos Futebol Clube", here in the United States. Together with various associations they have participated and continue to participate in many historical, cultural and sporting events both in the United States and Abroad. Since its inception, Jovem New York has entered the worldwide scene it has not only stood out in the United States and Japan but it has also flourished in other continents as well. The firm's location is over at Tuxedo Avenue in New Hyde Park, New York.

=== Torcida Jovem ===
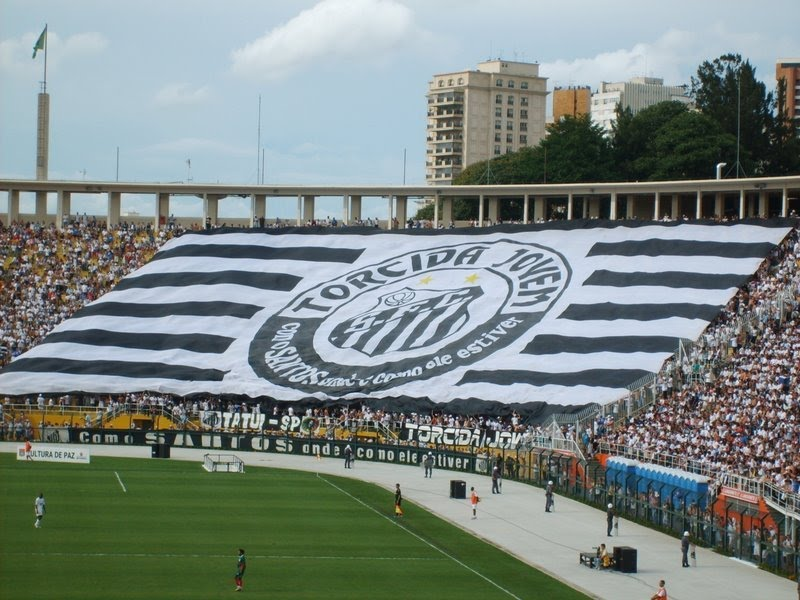
Torcida Jovem

The Torcida Jovem are a torcida organizada founded in 1969 by a group of fans from São Paulo, the group set out to make it a goal in attending every match that the club played in the capital of São Paulo. With over 30,000 members, it is one of the largest supporting groups in Brazil. The current president is Marcos Gordinho. Thirteen individuals were the driving force behind the creation of Torcida Jovem, with Cosmo Damiano, German, toboggan, Menezes, Celso Jatene and Ze Miguel being the principal de facto leaders. On September 26, 1969, when the club returned from another successful tour, unbeaten in a series of seven matches in Europe, the group gathered in an old house in the traditional bairro of Brás in São Paulo. It was decided to name the group Torcida Jovem since the founders were no older than 21 years of age. Cosmo's house became the first official seat of the first organized supporters group for Santos. The firm's first witness of the club's success came on November 19 of that same year in Rio de Janeiro in a match against Vasco da Gama as Pelé scored his 1,000th goal in the Maracanã.

== Celebrities ==
...I was 13 when I came to the stadium for the first time, it was when I attended a skating championship which was held here in Vila [Belmiro]. But it was only the second time I could walk on the lawn. It was exciting!...

— Juliana Goes, Playboy model, journalist and a fan of Santos.

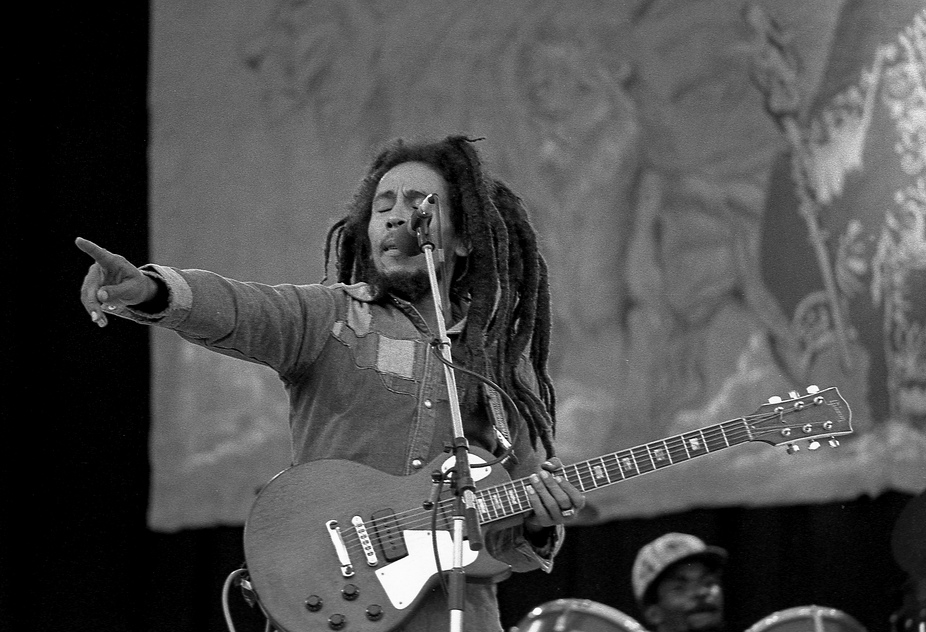
Bob Marley

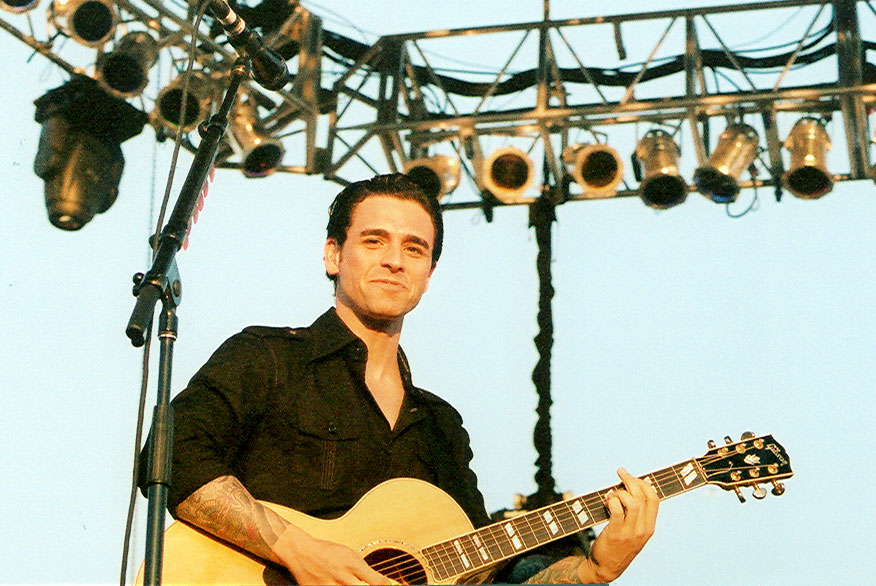
Chris Carrabba

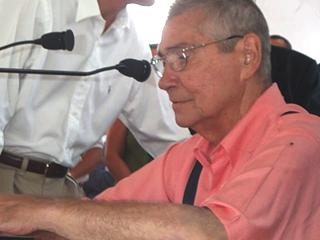
Mário Covas

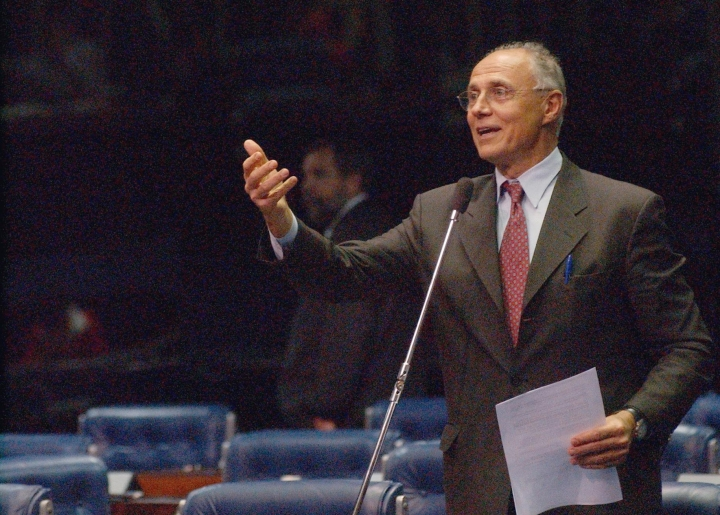
Eduardo Suplicy

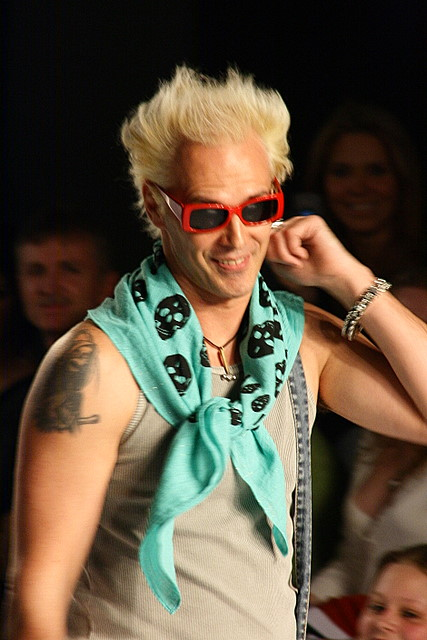
Supla

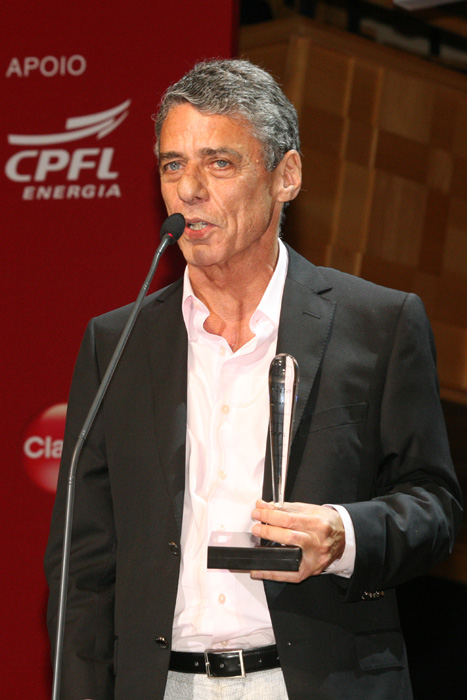
Chico Buarque

Given the team's proximity to Rio de Janeiro and São Paulo, as well as the popularity gained by the Peixe's Golden Generation of the 1960s, Os Santásticos, the Santos fanbase includes local celebrities in its fan group. Dr. Eduardo Ribeiro Filetti is a city celebrity famous for his work with animal care at the Clínica Veterinária Filetti. National celebrities also include Playboy model and journalist Juliana Goes. She has also modeled for VIP, an Irish magazine that has a circulation of over 35,000 magazines per year and hosts the annual VIP Style Awards held each year at the Shelbourne Hotel in Dublin., and Noivas & Noivos.

Pelé, former Santos player, named the "Athlete of the Century" by the International Olympic Committee, and widely regarded among football historians, former players and fans to be one of the best and most accomplished footballers in the game's history, is also a dedicated fan, inverting towards the club's youth academies. Another former player that habitually attends games at the Vila Belmiro with his family is Robinho. Mônica Waldvogel, hostess and journalist for GNT, is another dedicated fan. Vice-president of Rede Record Walter Zagari is a fan that attended every match of Santos at the 2011 Copa Libertadores.

Other Brazilian celebrities include singer Mariana Belém, prosecutor Luiz Antônio Marrey, director, writer, actor and television hoster Marcelo Tas and Danielle Zangrando, gold and bronze judo medalist at the 2007 Pan American Games and 1995 World Judo Championships, respectively. The film Santos: Especial by Mercado Livre was published in 2011, which talks about the most successful moments of the club during its coming centenary. Paulo Miklos, a multi-instrumentalist, musician and actor best known for his works for the band Titãs, Mário Covas, a Brazilian politician who studied engineering at the Polytechnic School of the University of São Paulo, was also a fan. He entered politics in his native city of Santos. Another political fan is Eduardo Suplicy, left-wing politician, economist and professor and one of the founders and main political figures on the Workers Party of Brazil (PT).

The club also has famous internationals in its ranks; Bob Marley, a famous Jamaican singer-songwriter and musician and the most widely known and revered performer of reggae music, played a practice match with Santos in 1980 along with the ska, rocksteady and reggae band Bob Marley & The Wailers. Bob Marley even wore the Santos uniform. Felinto Melro, vice-president of the world's largest cosmetics and beauty company, L'Oréal Group, habitually attends club matches at the Vila Belmiro.

List of famous supporters of Santos FC
Name	Nationality	Occupation	Employer/Group/Title
Paulo Miklos	Brazil	Multi-instrumentalist, musician, actor	Titãs
MC Doca	Brazil	Proibidão rapper	Cidinho and Doca
Mário Covas	Brazil	Politician	Partido da Social Democracia Brasileira
Chris Carrabba	Brazil	Singer, guitarist	Dashboard Confessional
Eduardo Suplicy	Brazil	Politician	Partido dos Trabalhadores
Eduardo Ribeiro Filetti	Brazil	Doctor, veterinarian	Clínica Veterinária Filetti
Supla	Brazil	Musician, presenter	Rock in Rio
Faustão	Brazil	Radio presenter, film director	Rede Globo
Juliana Goes	Brazil	model, journalist	Playboy, VIP
Zeca Baleiro	Brazil	MPB artist	
Paulo Henrique Amorim	Brazil	Blogger, journalist	Rede Globo
Geraldo Alckmin	Brazil	Politician	Governor of São Paulo
Tony Bellotto	Brazil	Musician, writer	
Marcos Frota	Brazil	Actor	
Walter Zagari	Brazil	Commercial director	Vice-president of Rede Record
Otaviano Costa	Brazil	TV host, actor	
Kiko Zambianchi	Brazil	Singer, composer	
Milton Neves	Brazil	TV host	
Sérgio Britto	Brazil	Musician	Titãs
Tony Bellotto	Brazil	Musician	Titãs
Mônica Waldvogel	Brazil	Hostess, journalist	GNT
Robert Scheidt	Brazil	Sailor	
Pelé	Brazil	Former Santos footballer	
Robinho	Brazil	Former Santos footballer	
Mariana Belém	Brazil		
Luiz Antônio Marrey	Brazil		
Marcelo Tas	Brazil	TV host, actor	
Danielle Zangrando	Brazil	Judoka	
Felinto Melro	Brazil		
Projota	Brazil	Rapper	
Mano Brown	Brazil	Rapper	Racionais MC's
Edi Rock	Brazil	Rapper	Racionais MC's
Jimmy Butler	USA	Basketball Player	Golden State Warriors
