= Santos FC Judô =

Judo club

Santos
- Full name: Santos Futebol Clube
- Nickname(s): Peixe (Fish); Santástico (Santastic); Alvinegro praiano (Beach black-and-white); Clube do povo (Club of the people)
- Founded: April 14, 1912; 113 years ago
- Ground: Academia Resistência, Santos
- Capacity: 20,120
- President: Luis Álvaro
- Website: http://www.santosfc.com.br
Home colors	Away colors

Santos Futebol Clube (Brazilian Portuguese: [ˈsɐ̃tus futʃiˈbɔw ˈklubi]; Santos Football Club), also known as Santos and familiarly as Peixe (pronounced [ˈpejʃi]), is a Brazilian professional judo club, based in Santos, Brazil.

Santos FC have judo as one of their sports since 1968. In late 2006, the club has partnered with the Associação de Judô Rogério Sampaio (AJRS), led by Olympic champion, who is deputy director of Santos FC. One of the biggest academies in the country in the sport, the athletes at AJRS has experienced and also performs the preparation of young athletes who play the amateur categories. Training is delivered by quality teachers, as the former coach of the Brazilian Ivo Nascimento. The AJRS has among its students no less than nine members of the Brazilian Judo - Andressa Fernandes, Mariana Santos Silva, Maria Suellen Altheman, Bruno Mendonça, Leandro Gonçalves Felipe Cesar Camilo de Oliveira, the senior, Raphael and Daniel Ribeiro Zavarizi Warzee Placido de Sousa, in Junior, and Beatriz Santos de Oliveira, the Juvenile.

The Academy of Rogério Sampaio also was instrumental in the formation and preparation of names such as Leandro Guilheiro, holder of two bronze medals at the Olympics, and Danielle Zangrando, the first Brazilian to climb the podium in a World Championship.

== See also ==
- Santos FC
- Santos FC (women)
- Santos FC (beach soccer)
- Santos FC Futsal
- Santos FC Futebol de mesa
- Santos FC Caratê
