= Santos FC Caratê =

Santos
- Full name: Santos Futebol Clube
- Nickname(s): Peixe (Fish); Santástico (Santastic); Alvinegro praiano (Beach black-and-white); Clube do povo (Club of the people)
- Founded: April 14, 1912; 113 years ago
- Ground: Academia Resistência, Santos
- Capacity: 20,120
- President: Luis Álvaro
- Manager: Paulo Bartolo
- Website: http://www.santosfc.com.br
Home colors	Away colors

Santos Futebol Clube (Brazilian Portuguese: [ˈsɐ̃tus futʃiˈbɔw ˈklubi]; Santos Football Club), also known as Santos and familiarly as Peixe (pronounced [ˈpejʃi]), is a Brazilian professional karate club, based in Santos, Brazil. Karate has been a practice within the club since 1982. Santos partnered with the Academia Resistência, with classes taught by Master Paulo Bartolo, deputy director of Santos. Bartolo has in his curriculum titles as the International Christmas Tournament (1996), the Fourth Annual Champions Invitational - Miami (1998) and the Florida Sunshine Cup - Miami. The sensei was also coach of the Brazilian in the World Cup in South Africa (1996). The Academy is the resistance Ana Costa Avenue, No. 541 - set from 62nd to 5th floor - at Gonzaga, Santos.

== See also ==
- Santos FC
- Santos FC (women)
- Santos FC (beach soccer)
- Santos FC Futsal
- Santos FC Futebol de mesa
- Santos FC Judô
