= Santos FC Golbol =

Santos
- Full name: Santos Futebol Clube
- Nicknames: Peixe (Fish); Santástico (Santastic); Alvinegro praiano (Beach black-and-white); Clube do povo (Club of the people)
- Founded: April 14, 1912; 114 years ago
- Ground: Academia Resistência, Santos
- Capacity: 20,120
- President: Luis Álvaro
- Website: http://www.santosfc.com.br/esportes/golball/
Home colors	Away colors

Santos Futebol Clube (Brazilian Portuguese: [ˈsɐ̃tus futʃiˈbɔw ˈklubi]; Santos Football Club), also known as Santos and familiarly as Peixe (pronounced [ˈpejʃi]), is a Brazilian professional goalball club, based in Santos, Brazil. A pioneer in the national sport, Santos FC created a goalball team in 1999 and became, in early 2006, the first football club in Brazil to become a paralympic club. Since then, through a partnership with the Lar das Moças Cegas de Santos (LMC), Santos has Goalball, with male and female teams, as one of its modalities. The sport is growing in popularity. In recent games, the Brazilian national team has featured players from Santos.
