= Santos FC Futebol de mesa =

Santos
- Full name: Santos Futebol Clube
- Nickname(s): Peixe (Fish); Santástico (Santastic); Alvinegro praiano (Beach black-and-white); Clube do povo (Club of the people)
- Founded: April 14, 1912; 113 years ago
- Ground: Arena Santos, Santos
- Capacity: 20,120
- President: Luis Álvaro
- Website: http://www.santosfc.com.br
Home colors	Away colors

Santos Futebol Clube (Brazilian Portuguese: [ˈsɐ̃tus futʃiˈbɔw ˈklubi]; Santos Football Club), also known as Santos and familiarly as Peixe (pronounced [ˈpejʃi]), is a Brazilian professional table football club, based in Santos, Brazil.

Table Football of Santos Football Club was initiated in 1997 by a group of Santos' footballers and company. Today, they have about 20 athletes vying for several state and national competitions. Santos FC is affiliated to the Paulista Football Federation (FPFM) from the foundation of the team in 1997, playing their uninterrupted official championships. These championships, the Club has always held great campaigns, having won major titles. The beginning of this story takes place in the Paulista Championship in 1997, when Santos FC ended the competition in third position. Since then, the Alvinegro Praiano is present in the main competitions of the sport in Brazil. Another major title was the UEFA Cup Interstate Paiva in 2003 Tacitus, before the CR Vasco da Gama (RJ), and the first title of the Paulista Championship Teams in 2006.

In addition to the championships by teams, also Table Football is played in the individual category. In this category, Ricardo Gonçalves Alves (Kiko) was Brazilian champion in 2002 and Masters Series Robby won the Brazil Cup 2007 held in Blumenau.

== Achievements ==
- Campeão Brasileiro Individual Masters 2002;
- Campeão da Taça Interestadual 2003;
- Campeão Paulista de Equipes 2006;
- Campeão da Copa do Brasil Individual 2007;
- Vice-Campeão da Copa Estado de São Paulo de Equipes 2007;
- Vice-Campeão da Copa Estado de São Paulo de Equipes 2010.

== See also ==
- Santos FC
- Santos FC (women)
- Santos FC (beach soccer)
- Santos FC Futsal
- Santos FC Judô
- Santos FC Caratê
