= Nelson Díaz (footballer) =

Uruguayan footballer (1942-2018)

Personal information
- Full name: Nelson Díaz Marmolejo
- Date of birth: 12 January 1942
- Place of birth: Uruguay
- Date of death: 4 December 2018 (aged 76)
- Position: Defender

Senior career*
| Years | Team | Apps | (Gls) |
- C.A. Peñarol

International career
- Uruguay
- * Club domestic league appearances and goals

Nelson Díaz Marmolejo (12 January 1942 – 4 December 2018) was a Uruguayan football defender who played for Uruguay in the 1966 FIFA World Cup. He also played for C.A. Peñarol.

Díaz died after suffering a heart attack on 4 December 2018, at the age of 76.
