= Santos FC =

Association football club in Brazil

- Full name: Santos Futebol Clube
- Nicknames: Peixe (Fish); Alvinegro (Black-and-White); Alvinegro Praiano (Black-and-White from the Beach); Santástico (Fantastic Santos)
- Founded: 14 April 1912; 114 years ago
- Ground: Vila Belmiro
- Capacity: 16,068
- President: Marcelo Teixeira
- Head coach: Cuca
- League: Campeonato Brasileiro Série A Campeonato Paulista
- 2025 2025: Série A, 12th of 20; Paulista, 4th of 16
- Website: santosfc.com.br
Home colors	Away colors	Third colors

Santos Futebol Clube (Brazilian Portuguese: [ˈsɐ̃tus futʃiˈbɔw ˈklubi]; English: Saints Football Club) is a Brazilian sports club based in Vila Belmiro, a bairro in the city of Santos. It plays in the Campeonato Paulista, the state of São Paulo's premier state league, as well as the Campeonato Brasileiro Série A, the top flight of the Brazilian football league system, after winning the 2024 Série B title.

The club was founded in 1912 by three sports enthusiasts from Santos: Raimundo Marques, Mário Ferraz de Campos, and Argemiro de Souza Júnior. The initiative was a response to the lack of representation the city had in football. Since then, Santos has become one of Brazil's most successful clubs, becoming a symbol of Joga Bonito (English: The Beautiful Game) in football culture, hence the motto "Técnica e Disciplina" (technique and discipline). This was largely thanks to the club's golden generation of the 1960s, with players like Gilmar, Mauro Ramos, Mengálvio, Coutinho, Pepe, and most notable of all, Pelé, named the "Athlete of the Century" by the International Olympic Committee, and widely regarded as the best and most accomplished footballer in the game's history. Os Santásticos, considered by some the best club team of all times, won a total of 24 titles during that decade including five consecutive league titles, a feat that remains unequaled today. Os Santásticos won four competitions in 1962, thus completing a quadruple, comprising the Campeonato Paulista, the Campeonato Brasileiro Série A, the Copa Libertadores, and the European/South American Cup.

Santos Futebol Clube is one of the most successful clubs in the Brasileirão, becoming national champions on eight occasions. It has also won 22 Paulistão titles, three Copa Libertadores, two Intercontinental Cups, one Supercopa de Campeones Intercontinentales, one Copa CONMEBOL (the precursor of current Copa Sudamericana), one Copa do Brasil, and one Recopa Sudamericana. On 20 January 1998, Santos became the first team, in any category in the world, to reach the milestone of 10,000 goals in the entire history of football and was voted by FIFA as one of the most successful clubs of the 20th century.

The team plays their home games at the Vila Belmiro, which currently holds up to 20,120 spectators. Santos' regular kit is white shirts, with white shorts, accompanied by white socks. Santos is nicknamed the Peixe (pronounced [ˈpejʃi]; "fish"), in reference to significance of the city's port. The most recognized Santista anthem is the "Leão do Mar" written by Mangeri Neto. In 2013, the club is the 2nd most valuable club in Brazil and South America, and 38th most valuable club in the world according to Brand Finance, worth over $65 million. In terms of revenue, Santos is Brazil's fourth-richest sports club and one of the biggest football clubs in the world, generating an annual turnover of over $114 million in 2012. Santos has many long-standing rivalries, most notably against Corinthians, Palmeiras, and São Paulo.

== History ==
=== Birth of Santos FC: 1912 ===
My time in football was short, but it had interesting moments. I started playing for Americano, which was founded by Sizino Patusca and Benedito Ernesto Guimarães. I was only 11 when I started playing football in 1906. My father, Turíbio Silveira of the Xavier da Silveira family, was a city sportsman. We had a great relationship with the Patusca, our relatives. We played together in Americano...me, my brother and my cousins while the club was in Santos. In 1911, Americano moved to São Paulo. Then, my cousins and I founded Santos Futebol Clube, which was registered in 1912.

— Arnaldo Silveira, one of the original founders of Santos, in an interview by O Estado de S. Paulo in 1980.

In the beginning of the 20th century, the city of Santos grew to become of great importance to Brazil. Its port became one of the largest in the world with coffee, a major product in those times, being the most exported product. With the influx of income, the wealthy socialites of the city became increasingly interested in having the city represented in sports. Being a port, water sports such as rowing were generally the most practiced activity by the city's youth, but the city had teams strong enough to compete in the Campeonatos Paulista or Paulistão, with Clube Atlético Internacional and Sport Club Americano being the two strongest representatives. Football was introduced to Santos in 1902 via the Instituto Presbiteriano Mackenzie, and the students created the two aforementioned clubs as a result.

However, Atlético Internacional dissolved in 1910 and Americano moved to São Paulo in 1911. With the city students dissatisfied at this turn of events, a meeting was held at the headquarters of the Concordia Club (located in Rosario Street No. 18, at the top of the old bakery and Switzerland confectionery, currently Avenida João Pessoa), with the aim of creating a football team. The conference, which lasted 14 hours, was spearheaded by three sportsmen from the city: Raymundo Marques Francisco, Mário Ferraz de Campos and Argemiro de Souza Junior. During the meeting, there was doubt as to the name that should be given to the club. Several suggestions emerged: África Futebol Clube, Associação Esportiva Brasil, Concórdia Futebol Clube, among others. But the participants unanimously approved the proposal of Edmundo Jorge de Araujo: Santos Foot-Ball Club. The club's first president was Sizino Patuska (who had participated in the founding of Atlético Internacional and was the founder of Americano).

=== Early years: 1912–1935 ===
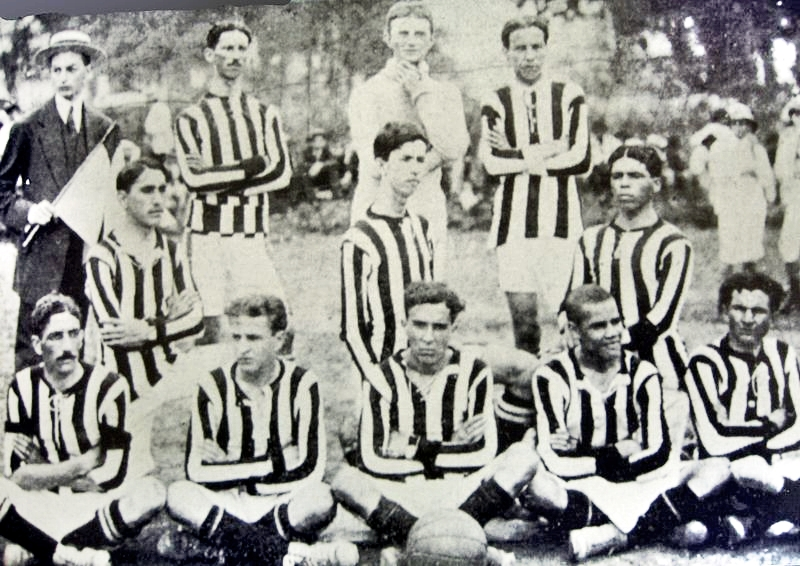
Santos FC of 1913

The club's first practice match took place on 23 June 1912 at the Villa Macuco field, against a local club called Thereza. Santos won 2–1. The first Santista goal was scored by Anacleto Ferramenta da Silva, with Geraule Moreira Ribeiro adding another one later on. The first official match took place on 15 September of that same year, beating Santos Athletic Club 3–2. Arnaldo Silveira, one of the original founders of Santos, scored the first official goal of the club. The Alvinegro Praiano [pt:Black & White Beach] took part in their first Campeonato Paulista in 1913, being thrashed 8–2 by Germânia on 1 June. Although Santos earned their first victory against Corinthians, a 3–6 away win at the Parque Antárctica (now known as the Estádio Palestra Itália), the 5–1 and 6–1 thumpings that Santos suffered at the hands of SC Internacional and Americano, respectively, and the high cost of travel, forced the team to abandon the tournament and make much needed improvements.

However, in 1913 the Campeonato Santista was first played, with the Alvinegro earning their first ever title after winning all six matches, scoring 35 goals and conceding only seven. In 1914, due to an internal financial crisis, Santos only played friendly matches, winning all seven of them. In 1915, Santos changed their name temporarily to União Futebol Clube in order to compete in another city tournament due to budgeting reasons. Even so, Santos still went on to earn another title, their second in three years. With economic stability on hand, the Vila Belmiro sports park was inaugurated on 12 October 1916. That same year, Santos returned to compete in another Campeonato Paulista finishing in a much-improved 5th place.

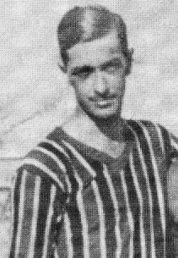
Araken Patusca (1923–29, 1935–37) is regarded as one of Santos' most iconic figures.

Between the 1917 and 1926 seasons, Santos was recognized as a solid and talented team, but one that could not offer a true challenge for the state title, finishing no higher than fourth place. That changed in 1927 when the tradition of the Alvinegro became defined during the 1920s: the discovery and creation of young talent. The team, known as O ataque dos 100 gols (English: The 100-goal attackers), was led by the first major club idol, Araken Patusca, son of the first president of Santos. With the Araken Patusca was the first Santista to participate in a World Cup, as a member of the Brazilian national team in the FIFA World Cup in 1930, the first World Cup. He played one match against Yugoslavia. Santos finished as runners-up in 1927, 1928 and 1929, scoring 100 goals in 16 games in the 1927 season, resulting in an incredible rate of 6.25 goals per match. The milestone of 100 goals was a result of work characteristics that later would become an excerpt in the official anthem of the club: Técnica e Disciplina (English: Technique and Discipline). Santos entered a period of irregular campaigns, coinciding with the club's transition to professionalism; in 1933 the president of Santos publicly declared Santos a professional side for the first time. This was followed by the club's first great success in 1935. During that season, the club prepared heavily for the Paulistão with 14 friendlies, winning seven, losing four and drawing three matches. The 10–1 thrashing of Espanha at the hands of Santos provided the highlight of its preseason preparations. On the last match of the state competition, Santos defeated Corinthians 2–0 at the Estádio Parque São Jorge, Corinthians' home ground at the time, to win their first state title ever, thanks to goals by Raul and an experienced Araken Patusca. This historic consecration sealed Santos' first major title and paved the way for future generations to follow.

Although Santos failed to retain the state title next season, the club remained undefeated in international matches during the 1930s, with seven wins and one draw. The most overwhelming win occurred against the France national football team, who arrived at Santos on 30 July after the FIFA World Cup in Uruguay and decided to use the stop to play against a local team, handidly losing 6–1 with four goals from Feitiço. Claiming they faced the Seleção rather than the club, the suspicious French were invited to the clubhouse to prove that the team that had just faced them was not the Brazilian team in disguise.

=== The road towards the second Paulistão: 1936–1955 ===
Following their triumph in the 1935 Paulistão, many key players of the winning squad left or retired soon afterwards, depleting the club of its veterans. Santos would finish in 4th place in their failed attempt to defend the state title in 1936. Patusca's departure in 1937 proved to be the closing chapter of his generation and the beginning of dismal campaigns in the Paulista tournament for the following 10 years, finishing no higher than 5th place.

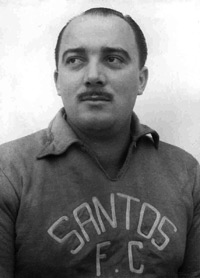
Lula managed Santos from 1954 to 1966

However, Santos' fortunes changed when former goalkeeper Athié Jorge Cury became club president in 1946 and immediately sought out to reconquer the state title. After getting the club's finances in order, he sanctioned a tour into the Brazilian northern and northeastern regions to face the top teams in Belém, Fortaleza, Natal and Recife, among other cities, and give the upcoming generation much needed experience. Santos soundly defeated many of the regions' top clubs such as Paysandu, Fortaleza EC, ABC, Santa Cruz, etc. Led by the club's second chronological idol Antoninho, the club went on undefeated in what was, until then, the longest football trip any Brazilian club has taken. It lasted from 29 November 1946 to 2 February 1947 with Santos obtaining 12 wins and three draws. The leading goal-scorers of the tour were Caxambu, with 19 goals, and Adolfrise, scoring 18.

The club managed to finish in 2nd place in the 1948 edition of the Paulistão, thanks to Antoninho, Pinho and Odair dos Santos. Odair become the club's season topscorer with 20 goals; he will repeat this feat for the following three seasons. Odair and Antoninho would also help the club finish 3rd in the 1950 edition of the state competition. This was the first time Santos had two top-three finishes in three seasons in the Paulistão since the O ataque dos 100 gols generation. Santos also participated in the Torneio Rio – São Paulo for the first time in 1952, finishing in third place overall. The arrivals of younger prospects such as Formiga, Manga, Tite, Zito and Vasconcelos coincided with the retirements of Odair and Antoninho in 1952 and 1953 respectively, ensuring the club had the quality to maintain its pursuit on the State championship. Antoninho would become the club's assistant manager in 1954 with Lula becoming the club's manager that same year.

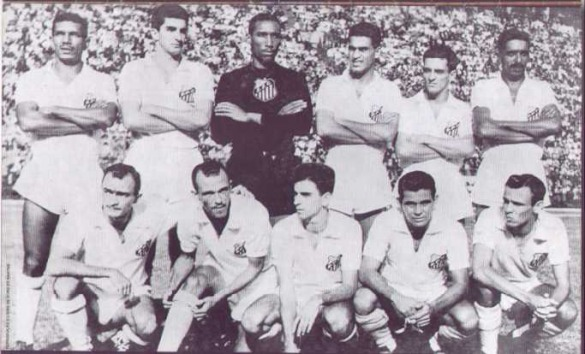
Santos' 1955 State Champion squad established the philosophy of the club's playing style

It was in 1955 when Santos finished building its base and establishments that would make it a success in the future. Despite starting that year's Paulistão with a mediocre 0–0 draw against Noroeste, the club would go on to remain undefeated for the first 11 matches in the competition which included a 7–1 victory over Jabaquara, the heaviest defeat they would inflict in that competition's edition. A 4–2 defeat to Guarani and an 8–0 drumming by Portuguesa brought setbacks and instability. A 3–1 loss to São Paulo and consecutive losses to São Bento and Corinthians put the club's aspirations to the state title in danger. However, the club's strong team spirit, the goals of Emanuele Del Vecchio, its relatively stable campaign and the 2–1 victory over Taubaté, Santos' last match in the competition, ensured the club would win their second state title ever, the first in 20 years. Del Vecchio's 38 goals were the club's highest season tally since Patusca's 53 in 1927. He was also the Paulistãos' top scorer with 23 goals. An infamous club anthem, "Leão do Mar", was created in order to commemorate this triumph.

In order to build upon the moment and provide a capable defense of the state title, Cury set in motion a series of plans and contracts after predicting that several of its veterans might opt to leave the club in a repeat of the aftermath in 1935. He secured the services of several established players such as Zito. Cury also invested to keep several young potentials like Pepe and the upcoming Pagão. The club president also gave Lula leeway to scout talented individuals who were trying out for the club. Perhaps the greatest signing Cury approved of was that of a 15-year-old boy brought over to Vila Belmiro by Waldemar de Brito. De Brito, who was a manager of Bauru Atlético Clube's junior squad, won three consecutive São Paulo state youth championships between 1954 and 1956 with the child. The boy, called Edson Arantes do Nascimento and who would be better known as Pelé in the near future, was the main driving force behind those victories. The contract between Santos and the young Pelé was finalized in June 1956.

=== Golden Era - Os Santásticos: 1956–1974 ===
==== The first Continental Treble in the world and the Pentacampeonato ====

Santos' Os Santásticos starting line-up of 1962 that managed to become the first team in the world to win the Continental Treble, winning the Paulistão, the Brasileirão, and the Copa Libertadores.

After 50 years Santos began to be seen as the best team in the world. When Pelé made his debut in the Campeonato Paulista in 1957, the team was already twice state champion (1955/56). Pelé had as fellow players Zito, Pagão, Formiga, Hélvio, Jair da Rosa Pinto, Urubatão, Tite and Pepe. Santos won the third state title in 50 years, the magical year of 1958 – in which Brazil won the World Cup in Sweden, with Zito Santos, Pelé and Pepe, and won in spectacular fashion. Santos scored 143 goals in 38 games, averaging 3.76 per game, and conceded only 40 goals. Pelé set a record that has never been equaled in any state competition in the country: he scored no less than 58 goals. Santos' traditional rivals were heavily beaten in 1958, particularly a 10–0 win against the Nacional. In addition to state titles, Santos won the Rio-São Paulo in 1959, beating Vasco in the final by 3–0 with two goals by Coutinho, who was only 16 years old. Coutinho also scored five goals against Ponte Preta, and Santos won the game by 12–1 even without Pelé.

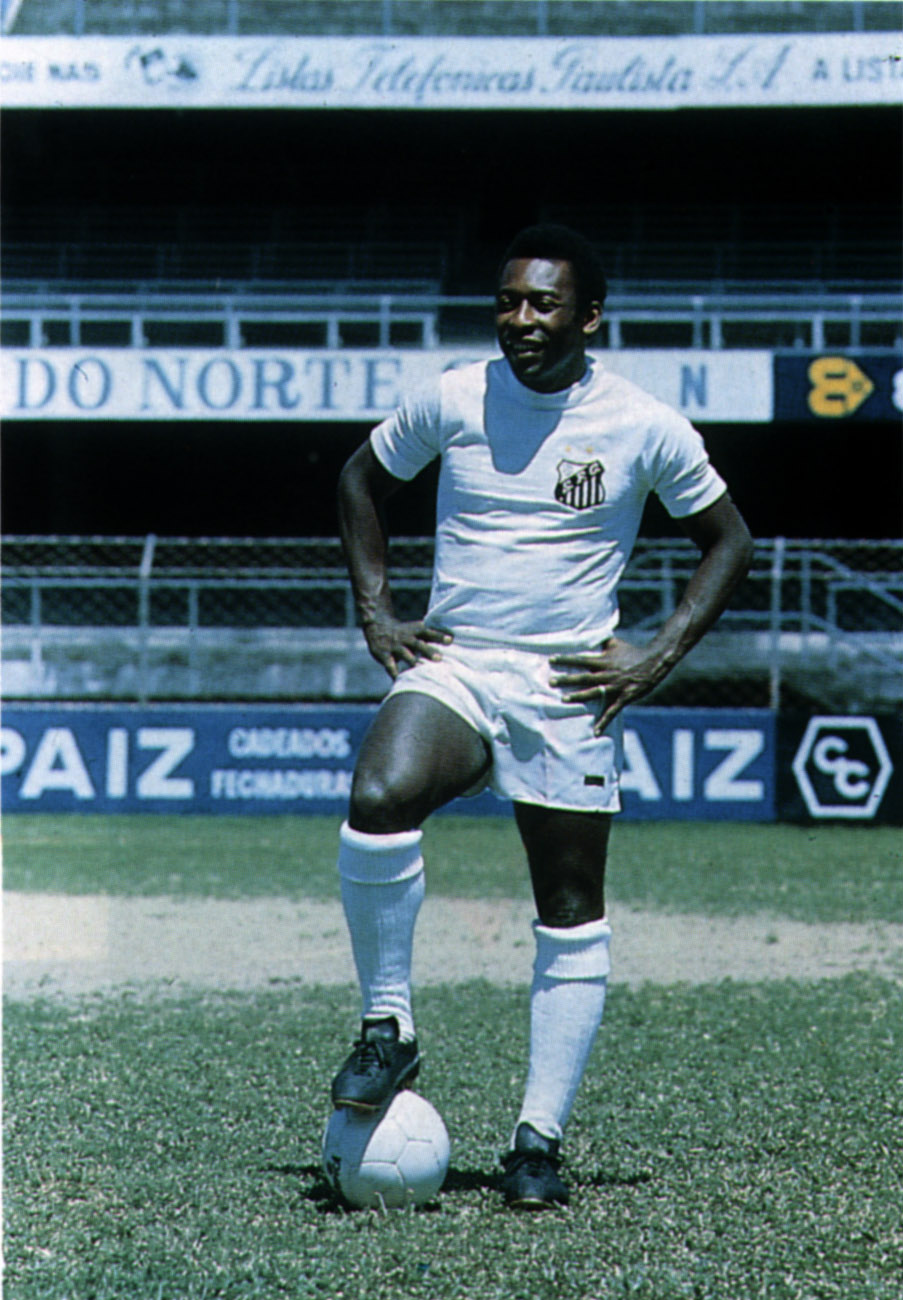
Pelé, known throughout the world as "The King of Football".

No other team had a dominance in Brazilian football as great as Santos in the 1960s. The club won eight titles: six Brazilian Championships (five Taça Brasil and one Torneio Roberto Gomes Pedrosa), two Copas Libertadores, two Intercontinental Cups, three Rio-São Paulo, a South American Recopa, a World and numerous international tournaments. A poll in the magazine El Gráfico saw dozens of experts from South America and Europe choose the Santos side of 1962/63 as the best team of all time.

==== Reprioritization, Rejuvenation and Renaissance of the Globetrotters ====
In demand worldwide, Santos became the first globetrotting football team and played exhibition matches in dozens of countries. The Biafra War was stopped so that the two sides could see Pelé's team play. Under pressure from the CBD (Brazilian Sport Confederation), which the team did not want to risk their star players in unsafe stadiums in South America, Santos did not participate in the editions of the Libertadores 1966, 1967 and 1969. Players from Santos and Botafogo formed the basis of the Brazilian World Cup sides in Chile (1962) and Mexico (1970). On two occasions – against Germany and England – the national team had eight Santos players in the team. In six games of qualifying for the 1970 World Cup "The beasts of the Saldanha" played with six Santos players : Carlos Alberto, Djalma Dias, Joel Camargo, Rildo, Pelé and Edu. The influence of Santos was very impactful that the defense played with the national team, used the same numbers that were used at Santos: right-back with the shirt 4, right center-back with the second, left center-back with the sixth and left-back with three. Finally, left-winger Antônio Simões, Benfica and Portugal said: "I compare the Santos 62 team with the national team of Brazil in 70. These are the two best football teams I have ever seen. The 70 side is the confirmation of a game model that Santos already demonstrated long ago."

==== Epilogue: Os Santásticos' legacy ====
Santos was champion in 1973, still with Pelé in the team, and again in 1978, driven by Meninos da Vila, Pita, Juary, João Paulo and Nilton Batata, the Santos of the 1970s became a symbol of passion and rapture. Their fans, who for a long time could not compete with the teams of the capital, steadily grew in number and started to compete with the massive Morumbi crowd, and significantly passed São Paulo and Palmeiras.

=== Intermittency: 1974–1994 ===
When it seemed that the club would be compromised by debt for the purchase of the luxurious Spa Park, Santos came back to be only eleven shirts who fought and drew crowds. While the debt resulted in the loss of the Spa Park and all that was invested in him, Santos maintained a popular fanbase.

The period began with Santos finishing runners up in the São Paulo state championship in 1980, of which Santos lost to São Paulo striker Serginho – who would later join Santos to become their top goalscorer in 1983. A passionate team fan since childhood, Sérgio Bernardino only felt at home when he was hired by President Milton Teixeira to the team that would compete in the 1993 Brazilian Championship. An opportunist with stamina, Serginho was the terror of opposition defenses in the Brazilian Championship and became the top scorer with 22 goals. The team took the runner-up slot, to win in São Paulo, Rio lost and was overtaken on goal for Flamengo. The following year the team became São Paulo state champions in a rally-point competition, ending Corinthians' dream of reaching the championship for the third straight year. In the game to Santos, the team defeated Corinthians 1–0 with a Serginho goal in the second half. Santos' striker was the top scorer again, this time tied with Chiquinho of Botafogo, with 16 goals.

=== The 90s and little success: 1995–2002 ===
In the 1990s Santos won only two tiles: the Rio – São Paulo Tournament in 1997 and the Copa CONMEBOL in 1998. In the final of the national Championship of 1995, Santos faced Botafogo, but could not beat the team from Rio de Janeiro.

The new chairman Marcelo Teixeira, son of former chairman Milton Teixeira, tried to prepare Santos for domination in the 21st century. No expense was spared to build a complete squad, with names as Freddy Rincón, Marcelinho Carioca, Edmundo, Márcio Santos, Carlos Germano, Valdo and Carlos Galván. Those big names could not translate their reputation into excellence on the pitch, resulting in a runner-up and a semi-final loss in the state championships of 2000 and 2001. In the national league Santos performed sub-par, with an 18th place in 2000 and a 15th in 2001.

=== The renewed Peixe: 2002–2008 ===
In 2002, after being in a severe financial crisis, Santos let go of high-profile players and focused at their youth squads for reinforcements, aiming to avoid relegation. Bringing in low cost players like André Luís (loan return from Fluminense), Maurinho (Etti-Jundiaí), Júlio Sérgio (Comercial-SP), Alberto (Rio Branco), and promoting Alex, Robinho and Diego from the youth setup, all of those seven players would become starters under new head coach Emerson Leão, along Elano, Paulo Almeida, Léo and Renato.

In a more than reasonable campaign Santos finished eighth in the regular season and thus qualified for the play-offs. Eliminating São Paulo (and its young duo Kaká and Luís Fabiano) in the quarter-finals, the club faced Grêmio in the semi-finals. After a 3–0 victory at the Vila Belmiro, they went through the final even after a 0–1 away loss.

With Robinho and Diego as the most important of Meninos da Vila, Corinthians was beaten in both of the final legs and thus Santos conquered its seventh national championship. The pedalada, one of the most disseminated tricks nowadays, was popularized by Robinho in the final match.

In 2003, Santos finished in second position in the first ever Brazilian national championship without a post-season play-off to determine the champion. The next year, however Santos returned to glory. In a year where fans felt their team was being intentionally hampered by referees, lost the right to play in its own stadium on various occasions and the kidnapping of Robinho's mother, Santos had an impressive campaign. Only two matches before the end of the competition, Santos was able to surpass Atlético Paranaense, who had been on top of the table for the majority of the season. In the last match Santos did not crumble and beat Vasco da Gama 2–1 for its eighth title.

With Robinho, Léo, Deivid and manager Vanderlei Luxemburgo leaving Santos in 2005, the team was unable to win more titles that year. Despite leading figures leaving, Santos was headed for a sixth-place finish until the Zveitão. Upon discovery that referee Edilson Pereira de Carvalho participated in manipulating results, all matches he led were played over again. Santos' 4–2 win against Corinthians thus became a 2–3 loss, which meant Santos dropped to the 11th place and gave its rival, Corinthians, the championship at cost of Internacional.

In 2006, Santos was fourth in Brazil, securing itself a spot in the Copa Libertadores, and won the Paulista Championship for the first time since 1984. In 2007 Santos lost its first match only in the first leg of the final yet winning the title through a second leg victory nonetheless. In the national championship Santos led the team to second place, 15 points behind champion São Paulo.

With again various big names leaving, 2008 proved to be a troublesome year for Santos. Only thanks to a comeback in the last few games was relegation avoided. In 2008 Santos played Copa Libertadores again. They endured until quarter-finals, when they were beaten by America (Mexico).

=== The Second Santástico: 2009–2013 ===
With a recurrence of financial problems, Santos recruited young players. In 2009, Neymar and Paulo Henrique Ganso joined the professional team; Neymar signed with the team when he was 13, while Ganso came from Paysandu, a northern team, when he was 15. They started to play together and developed a very strong bond. In 2010, they led a great team, which is the base of the actual squad. The team that won Campeonato Paulista this year was formed by: Felipe; Pará, Edu Dracena, Durval and Léo; Wesley, Arouca and Ganso; Neymar, André, and the repatriated Robinho. They also won Copa do Brasil 2010, beating Vitória in the finals, but with an overwhelming campaign. For example, they beat Naviraiense 10–0, which gave them the status of Santástico (Santos + Fantastic) again. This team is also known for the irreverent game style and the dancing celebrations.

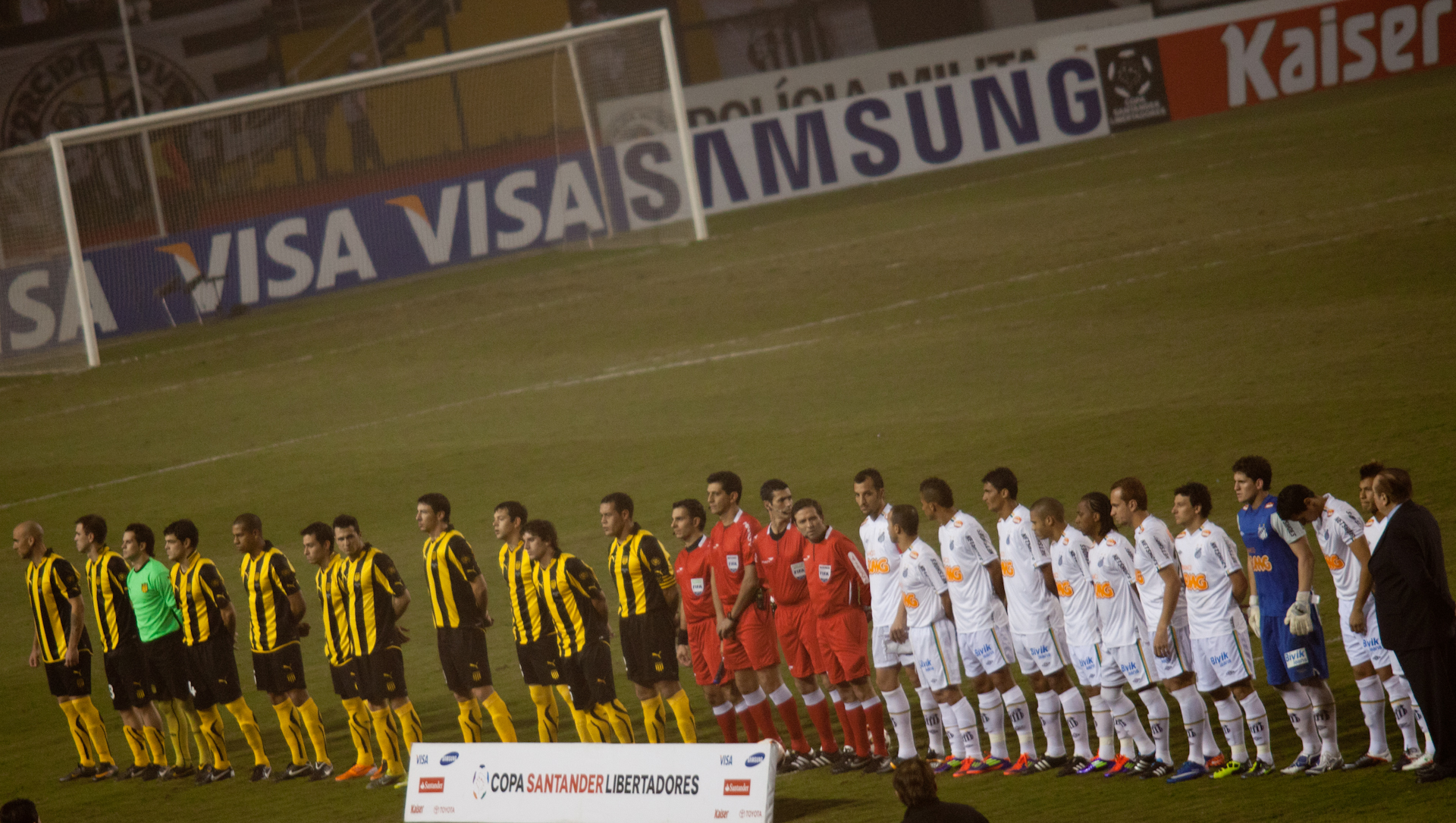
Santos FC v. Peñarol, 2011 Copa Libertadores Final

2011 was also a good year for the club. It raised its revenue with marketing and rights, mainly because of Neymar's success. Santos traded away some players from the previous year's team, but maintained some of the main players. Also, some other named players came from Europe to Peixe's squad, like Elano, Alan Kardec and Ibson. This year Santos won the Campeonato Paulista, beating two of its biggest rivals, São Paulo and Corinthians. The main team was formed by: Rafael Cabral; Danilo, Edu Dracena, Durval, Léo; Arouca, Adriano, Elano, Ganso; Neymar and Borges. This team also won the Copa Libertadores, beating Peñarol (Uruguay) in the finals. In December, Santos traveled to Japan and finished in the second position in the FIFA Club World Cup, beaten by Barcelona.

In 2012, Santos kept the two title per year ratio, winning the State Championships (Paulistão) against Guarani and the Recopa against Universidad de Chile. The team started to fragment, and saw the departures of Ganso (São Paulo), Borges (Cruzeiro), Elano (Grêmio) and other key players.

2013 marked the end of the latest Santástico era. Without achieving the fourth Paulistão in a row (runner-up), the eventual negotiations and departure of Neymar (negotiated with Barcelona), the coach Muricy Ramalho and the goalkeeper Rafael Cabral (Napoli) ended up leaving Santos as a shadow of its latest victorious installment. Santos ended the 2013 season in seventh place and had the best finish of any team from the state of São Paulo. At the end of the season, interim manager Claudinei Oliveira was let go of by the club on mutual terms and Santos hired Oswaldo de Oliveira to begin in 2014.

=== Financial problems and mid-table campaigns: 2014–2020 ===
In 2014, Santos began the year competing in the Paulistão and completing several signings, including the most expensive player ever bought by Santos, Leandro Damião. On 1 February, Gabriel (another player who came through the youth setup) scored Santos' 12,000th goal in a 5–1 routing over Botafogo-SP. Despite playing an enthusiastic football during the tournament (also being the most effective attack), Santos was defeated in the final round by fourth division side Ituano on penalty kicks, eventually finishing runner-up. On 2 September 2014, Oswaldo de Oliveira was released by the Santos board and replaced the next day by Enderson Moreira.

Santos finished 9th in the year's Brasileirão, and on 13 December 2014, Modesto Roma Júnior was elected the new president, after winning by 1,329 votes. The club also suffered with several financial troubles from the previous management, led by Odílio Rodrigues, and saw Damião, Arouca, Aranha and Eugenio Mena take legal actions against the club due to unpaid wages.

In 2015, due to the club's financial problems, free agents Elano and Ricardo Oliveira returned to Santos with a low wage, and the club also loaned out Damião (the most expensive player of the previous campaign). On 5 March, despite the club's unbeaten status, Enderson Moreira was sacked.

Marcelo Fernandes was appointed manager shortly after, winning the year's Paulistão. After a poor start in the Brasileirão, Dorival Júnior returned to the club after five years, taking it to the finals of 2015 Copa do Brasil and returning to G-4 after more than 130 rounds.

Dorival remained in charge of the club for the 2016 campaign, winning the year's Paulistão (22nd) and achieving a first place in Brasileirão for one week after eight years. During the 2017 campaign, the club sacked Dorival and subsequently appointed Levir Culpi; however, after the club's elimination of the Copa Libertadores and due to poor form, Levir was himself dismissed.

On 9 December 2017, José Carlos Peres was elected as the new president. The first manager of his tenure was Jair Ventura, who left the club in July 2018 after being in the relegation zone; Cuca (who already worked at the team in 2008) later took over and led the club to a 10th position.

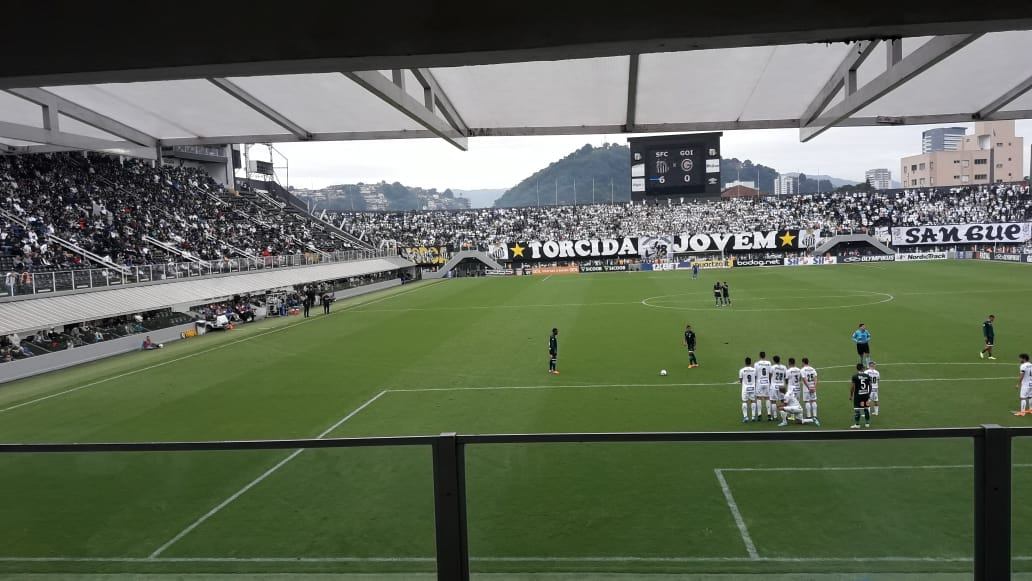
Santos playing against Goiás in August 2019

For the 2019 season, Santos hired widely known manager Jorge Sampaoli to take over the first team, and he led the club to a second position in the league; in the cups and in the state league, however, the club failed to repeat the same success after being knocked out in the first round of the Copa Sudamericana, in the round of 16 in the Copa do Brasil and in the semifinals of the Paulistão.

Sampaoli later resigned, and Jesualdo Ferreira was signed on his place for the 2020 campaign. Jesualdo was sacked in August, with the team having the worst campaign of a Série A side in the year's Paulistão, and Cuca returned to the club after being named manager in his place. Shortly after, president José Carlos Peres was removed from his role, and vice-president Orlando Rollo (who was also out from the club for more than a year after having public altercations with Peres) took over in an interim manner.

Santos also suffered various bans from FIFA during the 2020 season, after failing to pay the debts of Cléber Reis, Yeferson Soteldo and Felipe Aguilar. These bans led to debuts of several youth prospects in the first team, the most notable being Ângelo with just 15 years of age. On 12 December 2020, Andrés Rueda was elected as president of the club for the 2021–2023 three-year term, in which was the first online voting of the club's history.

=== Downfall and relegation to Série B: 2021–2024 ===
In January 2021, Santos reached the Final of the 2020 Copa Libertadores, but lost to local rivals Palmeiras after a goal in the stoppage time. In the following month, Cuca announced his departure from the club, and Argentine Ariel Holan was hired on his place for the 2021 campaign.

Holan resigned in April 2021, after a poor campaign in the Campeonato Paulista, and Fernando Diniz was appointed manager in May; he was himself dismissed in September, as the club was threatened with relegation in the Série A, and Fábio Carille finished the season as manager, leading the club to a 10th place. Carille was sacked in February 2022, with Argentine manager Fabián Bustos being appointed in his place.

Following a 2–1 home defeat against Fortaleza on the final matchday of the 2023 season, Santos finished 17th to be relegated to the Campeonato Brasileiro Série B for the first time in their 111-year history. On 9 December 2023, Marcelo Teixeira was elected the new president, returning to the role after 14 years.

For the 2024 season, the club's first-ever in the second division, Carille returned as head coach and led the side to the 2024 Campeonato Paulista finals. The club also won the Série B title with two rounds to go, but Carille was sacked on 18 November, before the campaign's final match.

=== Back to Série A and Neymar's return: 2025–present ===
Ahead of the 2025 season, Pedro Caixinha was hired as the club's new head coach. On 31 January of that year, the club announced the return of Neymar on a five-month contract. The season, however, ended in the 12th position in the league, well below most expectations; Neymar struggled with several minor injuries which prevented him to play on a regular basis, and Caixinha was later replaced by Cleber Xavier and then Juan Pablo Vojvoda, which helped the side to avoid relegation.

Neymar signed a one-year extension for the 2026 campaign, and Vojvoda remained in charge until March, when he was replaced by Cuca.

== Crest and colors ==
First kit (1912)

The first colors chosen for the new club were white, azure blue and golden lemon as an homage to Concórdia Club. But the difficulty to fabricate the colors on the uniform during those times forced a board meeting a year after the club's foundation. Pelúcio Paul suggested switching the official colors to white and black. According to Paul, the color white represents peace and black represents nobility. It received wide approval from the club members and the president of Santos, Raymundo Marques, based the club on the new colors.

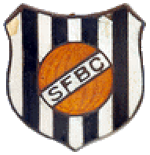
The first Santos FC emblem, 1912

Since the club's foundation, Santos have had eight main crests, though all underwent minor variations. In 1912, Santos adopted a black and white striped shield, with one of the early leather footballs in the middle and a diagonal band with the letters "SFBC". In order to pay homage to Concórdia Club (who let Santos use their headquarters to plan its foundation), the club used a crest that incorporated three golden lemon letters, the letters S, F and C, in the center of an azure blue circle. At the end of 1912, the crest was remade with a white band around the circle. The white band was surrounded by a golden lemon border. The letters were colored white with golden lemon serving as its outside borders. Due to the difficulty of creating these colors consistently, the crest was rebranded to a white badge with black borders and the letters 'SFC' colored black.

Later in 1913, the crest was redesigned as a badge inside a globe showing longitude and latitude lines as well as the equator. The badge had a black, diagonal band with "S.F.C." in white text. The top half above the band was white with a leather ball at the top left corner. The bottom half was a black and white striped background. Above the badge was a crown. During 1915, the club temporarily changed its name to União Futebol Clube and were forced to create a temporary crest for that year. The crest was an escutcheon with a white band that read 'União F.C.' and a black background. In 1925, the globe and crown were removed from the crest and it took its future form, only going through a remodelling in 2005.

On 27 December 2022, the club added a crown to the crest in honor of Pelé (who would later pass away two days after), the honor is positioned above the crest, between the two stars referring to the Intercontinental Cup titles in 1962 and 1963. The honor was proposed in the new statute, which was approved in November. Article 103 of the text says that "Santos will use in professional, amateur and futsal football games, both in the men's and women's categories, in all of its shirts, a crown over the existing stars of world titles, by way of permanent homage to Edson Arantes do Nascimento, O Rei Pelé".

== Sponsorship ==
Nation	Corporation
Material manufacturers
United Kingdom	Umbro
Financial sponsors
Brazil	Bet7K
Brazil	Canção Alimentos
Brazil	Farmácias Nissei
Brazil	Havan
Brazil	Kicaldo
Brazil	Loovi Seguros
Brazil	Next10 Nutrition
Brazil	Pague Safe
Brazil	Placo
Brazil	UNIASSELVI
Brazil	Viva Sorte

Since 1979, Santos has had 38 different sponsors, with Rainha being the club's first kit manufacturer. Casas Bahia, a Brazilian retail chain which specializes in furniture and home appliances, became the first sponsor for the Peixe. The club is currently primarily sponsored by kit manufacturers Umbro.

The team has also many sponsors that invest in the club as well. The current sponsors are Caixa (a Brazilian bank), Brahma (the second best-selling beer in Brazil), Semp and Algar Telecom (a Brazilian telecommunications company).

== Stadiums ==
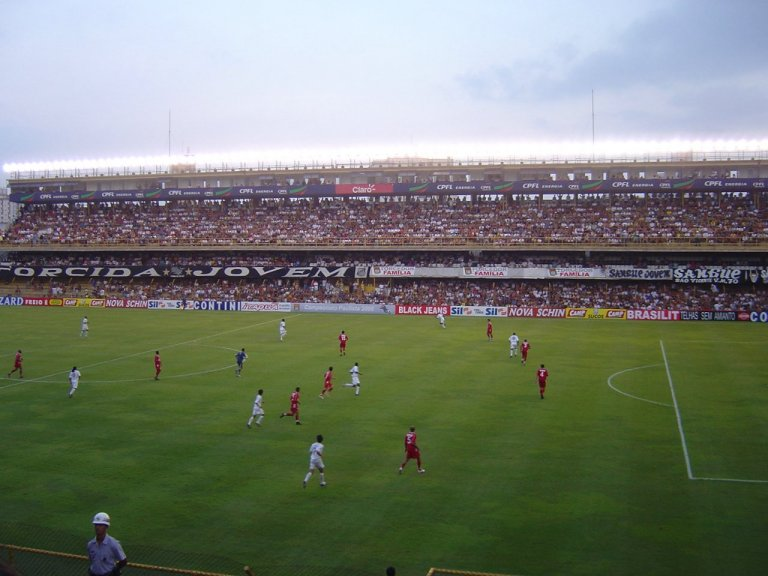
Estádio Urbano Caldeira

Soon after its foundation, Santos held their training in a field located in the district of Macuco. As the pitch did not meet the minimum size standards to host official matches, Santos played on the "Igreja Coração de Maria" pitch in Ana Costa Avenue. The field, however, was also used by other clubs in town. In 1915, the situation reached its breaking point, when Santos had constant conflicts with other city clubs on when the field could be used, forcing the club to reject several requests for international friendlies. To solve the problem, the leaders began searching for land in the city. On 31 May 1916, a general assembly approved the purchase of an area of 16,500 square meters, in the neighborhood of Vila Belmiro. On 12 October of that year, the inauguration of the Vila Belmiro sports park. The first game was held 10 days later, against Ypiranga for the 1916 Campeonato Paulista which Santos won 2–1. Adolpho Millon Jr. scored the first ever goal on that stadium.

The capacity has changed frequently, peaking at 32,989 in a 0–0 draw between Santos and Corinthians for the 1964 Campeonato Paulista. Since then, there have been a number of reductions due to modernizations. The last change was a new illumination system being installed on 27 January 1998, with an illumnination level of 1200 lux, more than the FIFA minimum recommendation. The Vila Belmiro was one of the venues of the 1949 Copa América, hosted the 1962 Copa Libertadores final and the 1998 Copa CONMEBOL final. It has also hosted a Copa do Brasil final in 2010. Due to its relative-low capacity, Santos has used other stadiums for high-profile matches such as the Estádio Palestra Itália, Pacaembu and Morumbi, all located in São Paulo, and the Maracanã in Rio de Janeiro. Current Santos President Luis Alvaro Ribeiro and other club directors are agreeing on building a stadium in a city nearby Santos called Cubatao, a stadium for 40,000 people which would become Santos' home field for almost 70% of the games during the season which would increase the team's profit.

In October 2005, the Centro de Treinamento Rei Pelé was inaugurated. Located in the Jabaquara neighborhood, the training ground, one of the most modern in Brazil, includes medical and training facilities for the first team and a hotel, Recanto dos Alvinegros.

The Centro de Treinamento Meninos da Vila, located in the Saboó neighborhood, constitutes two fields of equal size to the Vila Belmiro and it is intended for the training and development of players. The two fields are named in homage to the revelation of players Diego and Robinho. It was inaugurated in August 2006.

== Brand ==
The core strength of Santos's global brand is often attributed to Lula's success in leading Os Santasticos, which drew worldwide acclaim. The iconic team included Gilmar, Mauro, Mengálvio, Coutinho, Pepe and Pelé. This attention often generates greater interest in off-the-field, with the popularity of the club and brand spanning five continents across the globe. Many domestic and international clubs were founded in homage to Santos. In Macapá, Santos Futebol Clube do Macapá was founded in 1973. In João Pessoa, Santos Futebol Clube do João Pessoa was founded in 1949. In Viana, Angola, Santos Futebol Clube de Angola was founded in 2002. In Porto Alegre, Santos Futebol Clube de Alegrete also took after its Paulista model. Santos F.C. from Providence, Guyana is another example of the popularity of the infamous brand of the club. Kingston's Santos Football Club, four times national champions of Jamaica, pays tribute not only to the club, by using its name and crest, but also to the Brazilian national team by replacing the white color on the badge with yellow. The "Santos FC Academy" in Oak Park, California is a youth soccer academy in the United States that uses the club's name in tribute. In Iwata, Japan, "Santos FC Soccer Academy Japan" has grown in popularity since ts creation in 1993, having categories from the ages of six to nineteen while the club expanded its brand to Cairo, Egypt in 2008. "Santos FC's Soccer Academy" in Orlando, Florida is another one of the club's international branches. In Hong Kong, Nene Leung created the group Nene & The Santos Boys, a group of Chinese and Hong Kongers who dedicate themselves to watch Santos' matches.

Santos is one of Brazil's most economically powerful and richest football clubs; it had an annual turnover of US$45.1m (€31.5m) in 2011 and became one of the most valuable clubs, worth over $86.7m (€60.6m). That same year, Santos' squad became the most valued in South America, being worth over €82m, surpassing every club in the Dutch Eredivisie and the English Football League Championship, most of the clubs in Portugal's Primeira Liga, Ukraine's Premyer-Liha, Turkey's Süper Lig, Russia's Premier League and France's Ligue 1, as well as over half the clubs in Germany's Bundesliga, Italy's Serie A, Spain's La Liga and England's Premier League. Konami's Pro Evolution Soccer, a secondary sponsor of the official Copa Libertadores video game, featured Santos in the video game Pro Evolution Soccer 2012. This is the first time that the club is being featured on a video game. The flamboyant, attacking style of play adopted by this team (in contrast to the physical-minded approach favoured by European, Uruguayan and Argentinian teams of the era) was a constant, worldwide exhibition that saw Santos travel in over 50 countries on every continent (except Antarctica). The club's focus on commercial and sporting success brought significant profits in an industry often characterised by chronic losses. The strength of the Santos' brand was bolstered by its FIFA World Cup winners, especially Pelé. Pelé is hailed as a national hero. He is known for his accomplishments and contributions to the game of football. He is also acknowledged for his vocal support of policies to improve the social conditions of the poor (when he scored his 1,000th goal with Santos he dedicated it to the poor children of Brazil). During his career, he became known as "The King of Football" (O Rei do Futebol), "The King Pelé" (O Rei Pelé) or simply "The King" (O Rei). In 2013, Santos signed Pelé to a contract agreeing to make him its global ambassador, extending it to a lifetime contract in 2014, and will continue to use his image in its marketing campaigns.

== Supporters ==
Santos is one of the most popular clubs in Brazil. Santos has fans in all states of Brazil and fans in several different countries around the world. According to a survey conducted by the research firm Institute DataFolha in early 2006, Santos is the fourth most popular football club in Brazil. According to the results, Santos was preferred by 4% of the Brazilian population, which represents approximately 10 million fans in Brazil. It is estimated that Santos FC has nearly 20 million fans worldwide and admirers scattered throughout Africa, Europe, North America and Latin American countries. There are also several Santos organized fan clubs of football factories, among them Torcida Jovem do Santos, Sangue Jovem, and Força Jovem Santos. Santos is one of the clubs with the largest number of members in Brazil, currently has over 70,000 members.

== Rivalries ==
As Santos have no close rival within its own city, historical rivalries have been with Corinthians, São Paulo, and Palmeiras, clubs from nearby São Paulo city. The derby between Santos and São Paulo is known as "San–São", is one of the biggest Brazilian derbies because both teams are the biggest world champions and three times Copa Libertadores champions. The rivalry with Palmeiras is known as "Clássico da Saudade" (Nostalgia Derby) because in the 1960s, the two teams had great names in Brazilian football and were constant presences in championship decisions. The rivalry with Corinthians is known as "Clássico Alvinegro" (the Black and White Derby) because of the colors of both teams.

== Popular culture ==
The club has been featured in several documentary and semi-documentary films such as Guadalajara 70, Uma história de futebol, Dogão calabresa, and Boleiros. Former players have also been published, most notably Pelé, but others have appeared in films such as Ginga. Santos was the featured club in the film Asa Branca: Um Sonho Brasileiro, a story of a modest but talented soccer player for Santos who reaches stardom. Pelé appeared, alongside other footballers of the 1960s and 1970s, with Michael Caine, and Sylvester Stallone, in the 1981 film Escape to Victory, about an attempted escape from a World War II German POW Camp. The club has become a symbol of O Jogo Bonito (English: The Beautiful Game) in football culture. This was largely thanks to the Peixe's golden generation of the 1960s, the Santásticos, considered by some the best club team of all times.

The club has many local celebrities in its fan group, such as Brazilian singer Mariana Belém, current governor of São Paulo Geraldo Alckmin, current governor of Federal District (Brasília) Agnelo Queiroz, prosecutor Luiz Antônio Marrey, director, writer, actor and television hoster Marcelo Tas and Danielle Zangrando, gold and bronze judo medalist at the 2007 Pan American Games and 1995 World Judo Championships, respectively. Bob Marley, a famous Jamaican singer-songwriter and musician and the most widely known and revered performer of reggae music, played a practice match with Santos in 1980 along with the ska, rocksteady and reggae band Bob Marley & The Wailers. Bob Marley even wore the Santos uniform.

The Brazilian classical composer Gilberto Mendes, who was born and lived in the city of Santos, wrote in 1969 an oeuvre called Santos Football Music, with audience interaction and a radio broadcast, previously recorded, of a sports commentator narrating a football game of Santos FC, all forming a cluster with the orchestra.

Santos 100 Anos de Futebol Arte was a film released in 2012, year of the centenary of Santos FC, documenting the trajectory of the club during its 100 years of history.

== Players ==
Brazilian teams are limited to five players without Brazilian citizenship per match. The squad list includes only the principal nationality of each player; some players on the squad may have dual citizenship with another country.

=== Current squad ===
As of 22 September 2026

Note: Flags indicate national team as defined under FIFA eligibility rules; some limited exceptions apply. Players may hold more than one non-FIFA nationality.

No.	Pos.	Nation	Player
1	GK	BRA	Diógenes
3	DF	BRA	Vinicius Lira
4	DF	BRA	Lucas Veríssimo
5	MF	BRA	João Schmidt
6	MF	BRA	Arthur
7	FW	BRA	Everton Cebolinha
8	MF	BRA	Gabriel Bontempo
9	FW	BRA	Gabriel Barbosa (on loan from Cruzeiro)
10	MF	BRA	Neymar (captain)
11	MF	BRA	Philippe Coutinho
14	DF	BRA	Luan Peres
15	MF	BRA	Willian Arão
16	FW	BRA	Thaciano
17	FW	PAR	Gustavo Caballero
18	DF	BRA	Igor Vinícius
20	MF	BRA	Pepê Fermino
21	FW	BRA	Moisés
22	FW	ARG	Álvaro Barreal
23	DF	BRA	Rodinei

No.	Pos.	Nation	Player
25	DF	BRA	Gabriel Menino (on loan from Atlético Mineiro)
26	DF	BRA	João Ananias
27	DF	BRA	Davizinho
28	MF	URU	Christian Oliva
30	MF	BOL	Miguel Terceros
31	DF	ARG	Gonzalo Escobar
32	MF	ARG	Benjamín Rollheiser
33	FW	BRA	Rony
34	GK	BRA	João Paulo
38	DF	BRA	Rafael Gonzaga
42	DF	BRA	João Alencar
45	MF	BRA	Lima (on loan from Fluminense)
48	MF	BRA	Gustavo Henrique
57	FW	BRA	Nadson
67	GK	BRA	Rodrigo Falcão
77	GK	BRA	Gabriel Brazão
79	GK	BRA	João Pedro
81	MF	BRA	Samuel Pierri

=== Youth team ===
Note: Flags indicate national team as defined under FIFA eligibility rules; some limited exceptions apply. Players may hold more than one non-FIFA nationality.

No.	Pos.	Nation	Player
39	FW	BRA	Pedro Assis
47	FW	BRA	Mateus Xavier

No.	Pos.	Nation	Player
55	FW	BRA	Fernando Pradella
76	MF	BRA	Vinicius Fabri

=== Other players under contract ===
Note: Flags indicate national team as defined under FIFA eligibility rules; some limited exceptions apply. Players may hold more than one non-FIFA nationality.

No.	Pos.	Nation	Player
—	GK	BRA	João Fernandes
—	FW	BRA	Enzo Boer

=== Out on loan ===
Note: Flags indicate national team as defined under FIFA eligibility rules; some limited exceptions apply. Players may hold more than one non-FIFA nationality.

No.	Pos.	Nation	Player
—	DF	PAR	Alexis Duarte (to Libertad until 31 December 2026)
—	DF	BRA	Hayner (to Vila Nova until 30 November 2026)
—	DF	BRA	Kevyson (to Ponte Preta until 30 November 2026)
—	DF	BRA	Luisão (to Goiás until 30 November 2026)
—	DF	BRA	Nathan Santos (to Juventude until 30 November 2026)
—	DF	BRA	Zé Ivaldo (to Remo until 31 December 2026)
—	MF	BRA	Bernardo (to Amazonas until 30 November 2026)

No.	Pos.	Nation	Player
—	MF	BRA	Hyan (to Avaí until 30 November 2026)
—	MF	BRA	Patrick (at Remo until 31 December 2026)
—	FW	BRA	Andrey Quintino (at Confiança until 30 November 2026)
—	FW	BOL	Enzo Monteiro (at Chungbuk Cheongju until 31 December 2026)
—	FW	BRA	Felipe Laurindo (at Cianorte until 30 September 2026)
—	FW	BRA	Robinho Júnior (at Genoa until 30 June 2027)

== Personnel ==
=== Current technical staff ===
Position	Staff
Head coach	(Brazil) Cuca
Assistant coach	(Brazil) Cuquinha (Brazil) Eudes Pedro (Brazil) Vinicius Marques
Fitness coach	(Brazil) Omar Feitosa
Goalkeeper coach	(Brazil) Rogério Maia (Brazil) Denis Gago
Performance analyst	(Brazil) Felipe Lopes (Brazil) Gabriel Soares (Brazil) Raphael Barletta
Physioterapist	(Brazil) Adonai Silva (Brazil) João Nobre (Brazil) Kesley Andrade (Brazil) Luis Alberto Rosan (Brazil) Marcelo Amâncio (Brazil) Rafael Martini
Physiologist	(Brazil) Alef Pinheiro (Brazil) Alexandre Galvão
Doctor	(Brazil) Leandro Masni (Brazil) Maurício Zenaide (Brazil) Ricardo Nobre
Nutritionist	(Brazil) Alessandra Favano

Last updated: 25 March 2026
Source: Santos FC

=== Board and other staff ===
Office	Name
President	Marcelo Teixeira
Vice president	Fernando Bonavides
Football executive	Alexandre Mattos
Football manager	Gustavo Ferreira
Technical coordinator	César Sampaio
Youth football director	José Renato Quaresma
Youth general manager	Elano Blumer

Last updated: 3 March 2026
Source: Santos FC

== Honours ==
Historically, Santos is Brazil's fourth most successful team, having won nine domestic trophies, and one of the most recognized football clubs in the world, having won eight international trophies, making them the seventh most successful team in South America (along with Olimpia for official international competitions won, all recognized by CONMEBOL); and the Intercontinental Champions' Supercup title.

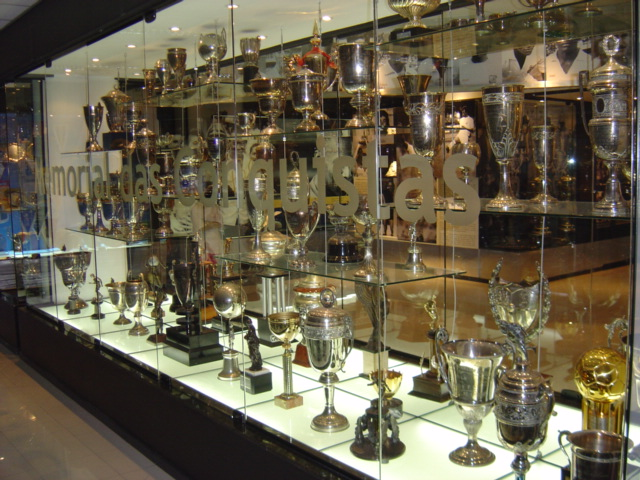
Memorial das Conquistas

=== Official tournaments ===
Worldwide
Competitions	Titles	Seasons
Intercontinental Cup	2	1962, 1963
Intercontinental
Competitions	Titles	Seasons
Intercontinental Champions' Supercup	1^{s}	1968
Continental
Competitions	Titles	Seasons
Copa Libertadores	3	1962, 1963, 2011
Recopa Sudamericana	1	2012
Copa CONMEBOL	1	1998
National
Competitions	Titles	Seasons
Campeonato Brasileiro Série A	8	1961, 1962, 1963, 1964, 1965, 1968 (RGP), 2002, 2004
Copa do Brasil	1	2010
Campeonato Brasileiro Série B	1	2024
Inter-state
Competitions	Titles	Seasons
Torneio Rio–São Paulo	5^{s}	1959, 1963, 1964, 1966, 1997
State
Competitions	Titles	Seasons
Campeonato Paulista	22	1935, 1955, 1956, 1958, 1960, 1961, 1962, 1964, 1965, 1967, 1968, 1969, 1973, 1978, 1984, 2006, 2007, 2010, 2011, 2012, 2015, 2016
Copa Paulista	1	2004

- record
- ^{s} shared record

=== Others tournaments ===
==== International ====
- Torneio Internacional da FPF (1): 1956
- Dr. Mario Echandi Trophy (1): 1959
- Mexico City International Tournament (1): 1959
- Orange Trophy (1): 1959
- Teresa Herrera Trophy (1): 1959
- Gialorosso Trophy (1): 1960
- Tournoi de Paris (2): 1960, 1961
- Italy Tournament (1): 1961
- Pentagonal Tournament of Guadalajara (1): 1961
- Costa Rica Triangular Tournament (1): 1961
- Copa Iberoamericana (1): 1965
- Caracas Tournament (1): 1965
- Santiago International Tournament (4): 1965, 1968, 1970, 1977
- New York Tournament (1): 1966
- Florence Triangular Tournament (1): 1967
- Chile Octagonal Tournament (1): 1968
- Buenos Aires Pentagonal Tournament (1): 1968
- Guatemala Triangular Tournament (1): 1970
- Kingston Triangular Tournament (1): 1971
- Governor Luis Ducoing Cup (1): 1977
- City of Seville Trophy (1): 1980
- Trofeo Reyno de Navarra (1): 1983
- Winners of America Tournament (1): 1983
- Kirin Cup (1): 1985
- Marseille City Tournament (1): 1987
- American Super Cup (1): 1990

==== National and Inter-state ====
- Torneio Quadrangular de Belo Horizonte (1): 1951
- Taça dos Campeões Estaduais Rio–São Paulo (1): 1956
- Torneio Amazônia (1): 1968
- Torneio de Cuiabá (1): 1969
- Torneio Governador da Bahia (1): 1975
- Copa Dener (1): 1994
- Torneio de Verão (1): 1996
- Troféu Osmar Santos (1): 2004
- Troféu João Saldanha (1): 2004

==== State ====
- Taça Cidade de São Paulo (1): 1949
- Taça Cidade de São Paulo (1): 1970
- Torneio Laudo Natel (1): 1975
- Torneio Início (5): 1926 Extra (APEA), 1928 (APEA), 1937, 1952, 1984

==== City ====
- Campeonato Santista (ASEA) (3): 1913, 1915, 1929 (aspiring team)
- Taça Cidade de Santos (5): 1926, 1948, 1955, 1995, 1997
- Torneio Início Santista (1): 1930 (aspiring team)
- Taça Santos (1): 1952
- Trofeu Rubens Ulhoa Cintra (1): 1967

=== Runners-up ===
- FIFA Club World Cup (1): 2011
- Copa Libertadores (2): 2003, 2020
- Campeonato Brasileiro Série A (8): 1959, 1966, 1983, 1995, 2003, 2007, 2016, 2019
- Copa do Brasil (1): 2015
- Torneio Rio–São Paulo (1): 1999
- Campeonato Paulista (13): 1927, 1928, 1929, 1948, 1950, 1957, 1959, 1980, 2000, 2009, 2013, 2014, 2024
- Copa Paulista (1): 1962

=== Youth team ===
- Copa do Brasil Sub-20 (1): 2013
- Copa São Paulo de Futebol Júnior (3): 1984, 2013, 2014
- Copa Votorantim Sub-15 (1): 2023

=== Awards ===
- Fita Azul (2): 1967, 1972

Fita Azul do Futebol Brasileiro (Brazilian Football Blue Ribbon) was an award given for the club which succeeds in an excursion out of the country.

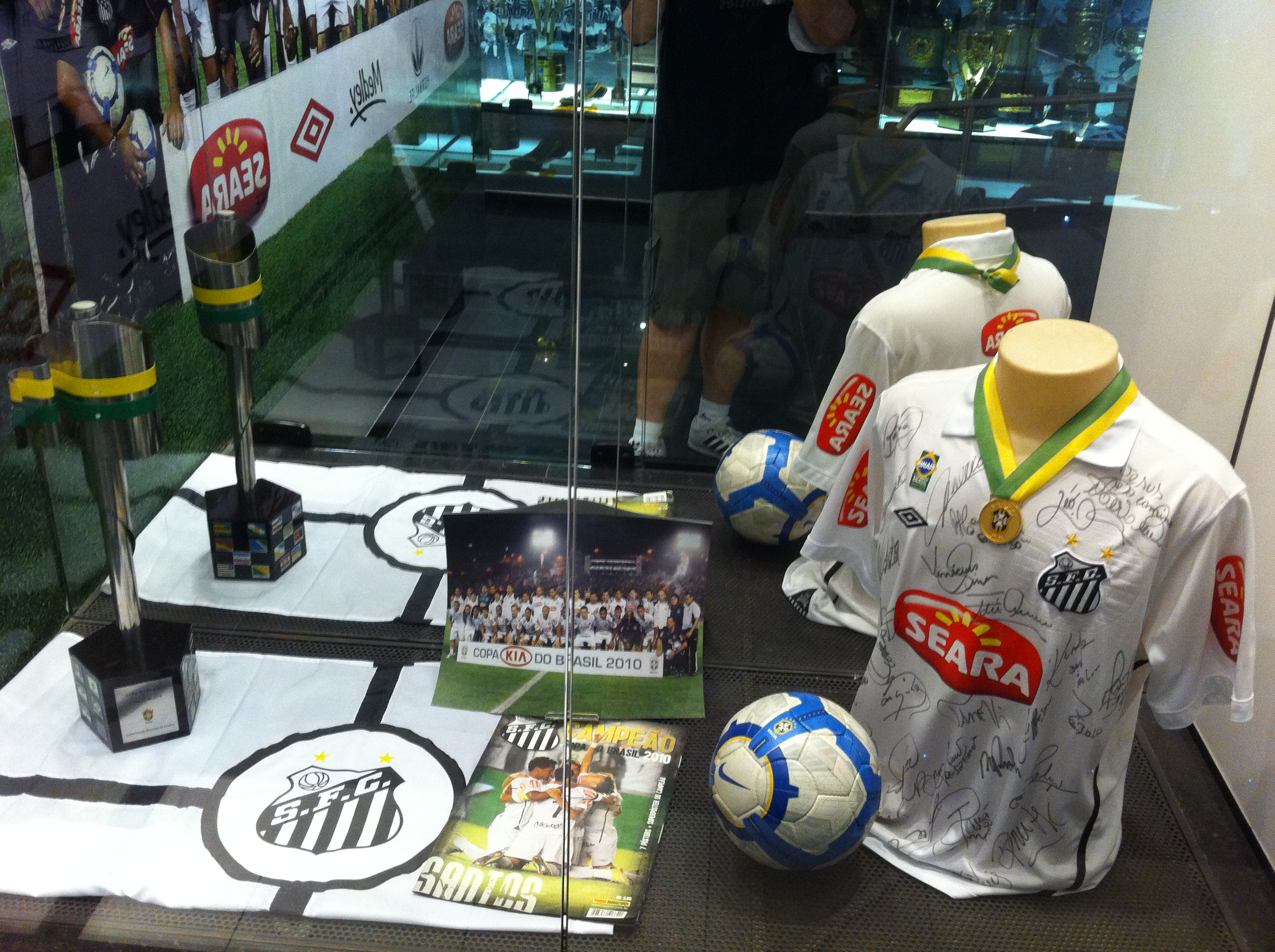
2010 Copa do Brasil

=== Doubles and trebles ===
- The Double

Domestic Double

State and Cup: 2010
State and League: 1961, 1964, 1965, 1968

Continental Double

State and Copa Libertadores: 2011
League and Copa Libertadores: 1963

- The Treble

Continental Treble

State, League and Copa Libertadores: 1962

Especially short competitions such as the Recopa Sudamericana, Intercontinental Cup (now defunct), or FIFA Club World Cup are not generally considered to contribute towards a Double or Treble.

== Statistics and records ==
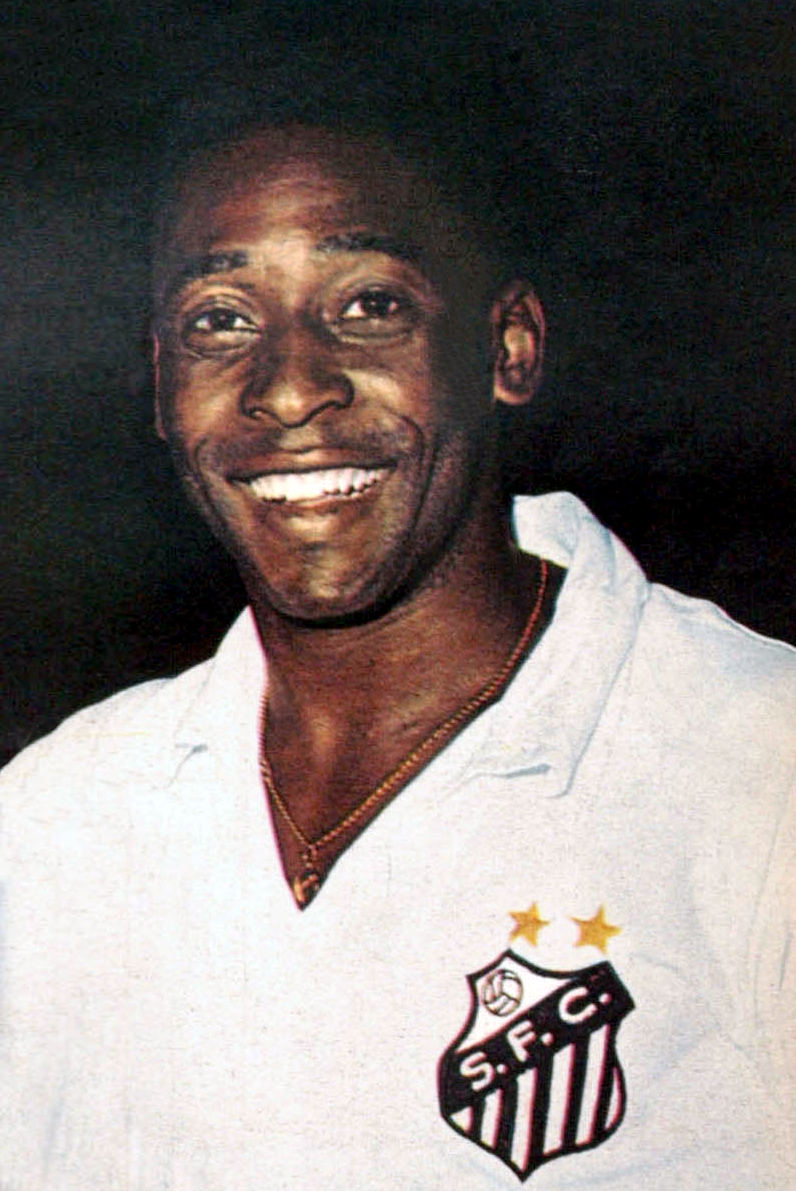
Pelé is Santos's all-time top goalscorer and top appearance record holder.

Pelé holds the record for most Santos appearances, having played 1106 first-team matches from 1956 to 1974. Pepe is second, having played 750 times. The record for a goalkeeper is held by Agenor "Manga" Gomes, with 404 appearances. Five other players also have more than 500 appearances: Zito (727), Lima (696), Dorval (612), Edú (584) and Clodoaldo (510). Pelé is also Santos's all-time top goalscorer, with 1091 goals. Four other players have also scored over 200 goals for Santos: Pepe (405), Coutinho (370), Toninho Guerreiro (283) and Feitiço (216).

Borges holds the record for the most Brasileirão goals scored in one season for the club (23 in 2011). Feitiço's 31 goals in the 1931 Campeonato Paulista was the one-season record in the Campeonato Paulista, until it was surpassed by Pelé's 58 goals in 1958, whose record still stands. Officially, the highest home attendance for a Santos match is 132,728, in the Intercontinental Cup, in 1963. Santos has also set records in Brazilian football, most notably the most domestic titles (8 as of 2011) and the most seasons won in a row (5, from 1961 to 1965).

Santos is the joint-most successful Brazilian team in the Copa Libertadores, winning the 1962, 1963 and 2011 editions. Santos is Brazil's joint-second in Copa Libertadores semifinal appearances with seven in total. The club is also the first Brazilian side to win the Copa Libertadores without losing a single match, which it did in the 1963 season. In 1962, Santos won the Paulista, Taça Brasil, and the Copa Libertadores.

== Sections in other sports ==
- Santos FC (women)
- Santos FC Caratê
- Santos FC Futebol de mesa
- Santos FC Futsal (defunct)
- Santos FC Golbol
- Santos FC Judô
- Santos FC Taekwondo
- Santos FC Tênis de mesa
- Santos FC Tsunami
- Santos FC Voleibol
- Santos Dexterity (eSports)

== See also ==
- Santos FC and the Brazil national football team
- Santos FC (women)
- Santos FC (youth)
- Santos FC (beach soccer)
- Santos FC Futsal
- Santos FC Futebol de mesa
- Santos FC Judô
- Santos FC Caratê
- Torcida Jovem
- List of world champion football clubs

== Filmography ==
- Aníbal Massaini Neto, Pelé Eterno, 2004.
- Carlos Hugo Christensen, O Rei Pelé, 1963.
- Djalma Limongi Batista, Asa Branca: um sonho brasileiro, 1981.
- Eduardo Escorel and Luiz Carlos Barreto, Isto é Pelé, 1974.
- Felipe Nepomuceno, Guadalajara 70, 2002.
- Hank Levine, Marcelo Machado and Tocha Alves, Ginga, 2004.
- Lina Chamie, Santos 100 Anos de Futebol Arte, 2012.
- Mercado Livre, Santos, Especial, 2011.
- Paulo Machline, Uma história de futebol, 1998.
- Pedro Asbeg, Dogão calabresa, 2002.
- Ugo Giorgetti, Boleiros, 1998.
