= Alberto Sainz =

Argentine footballer

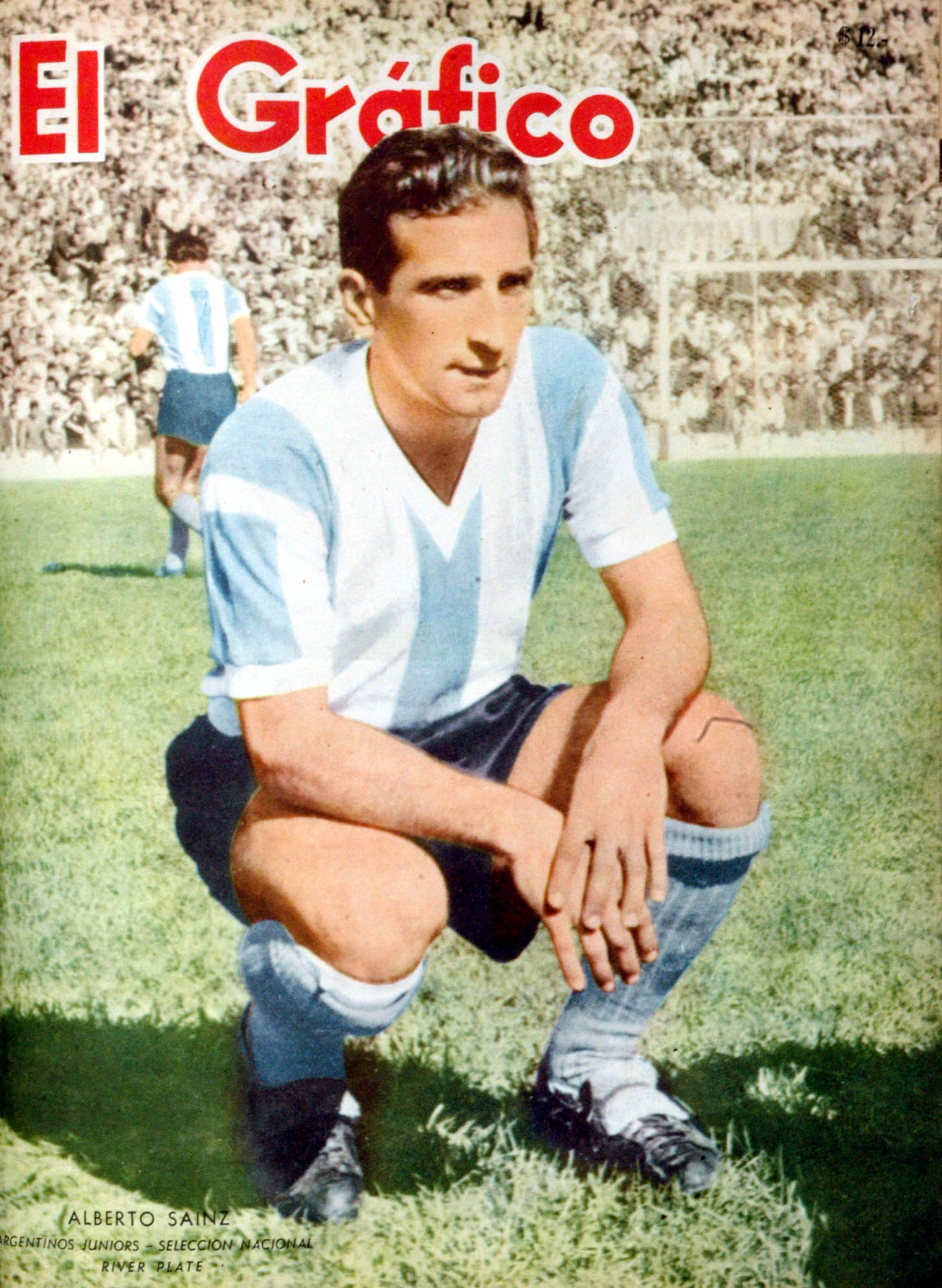

Personal information
- Full name: Alberto Sainz
- Date of birth: 13 December 1937
- Place of birth: Buenos Aires, Argentina
- Date of death: 16 January 2016 (aged 78)
- Height: 1.62 m (5 ft 4 in)
- Position: Defender

Senior career*
Years	Team	Apps	(Gls)
1958–1961	Argentinos Juniors	72	(0)
1962–1967	River Plate	151	(1)
1968–1969	San Lorenzo de Mar del Plata	14	(0)

International career
1961-1966	Argentina	6	(0)
- * Club domestic league appearances and goals

Alberto "Nicha" Sainz (13 December 1937 – 16 January 2016) was an Argentine association football player.

Sainz began his career in 1958 at Argentinos Juniors, where he played until 1961. In 1962 he moved to Club Atlético River Plate with whom he reached the final of the 1966 Copa Libertadores, where they lost to Uruguayan side C.A. Peñarol. He stayed at River Plate until 1967 and then moved to San Lorenzo from Mar de Plata in 1968 before retiring in 1969.

Sainz was member of the Argentina squad at the 1962 FIFA World Cup, where Argentina were eliminated in the group stage. He appeared in groups stage matches against Bulgaria and Hungary.
