= 2004 Santos FC season =

Santos
2004 season
- President: Marcelo Teixeira
- Coach: Emerson Leão (until 5 May); Vanderlei Luxemburgo
- Campeonato Brasileiro: 1st
- Campeonato Paulista: Semi-finals
- Copa Libertadores: Quarter-finals
- Copa Sudamericana: Quarter-finals
- Top goalscorer: League: Deivid (22); All: Robinho (32)

The 2004 season was Santos Futebol Clube's ninety-eighth season in existence and the club's forty-fifth consecutive season in the top flight of Brazilian football.

Santos won the Campeonato Brasileiro title for the eighth time in history by beating Vasco da Gama 2–1 on the final day of the season.

They were knocked out of the Campeonato Paulista in the semi-finals after losing 3–7 on aggregate against São Caetano.

Santos also played the Copa Libertadores for the seventh time, losing 1–2 in the quarter-finals to the eventual winners Once Caldas.

== Players ==
=== Squad information ===
Note: Flags indicate national team as defined under FIFA eligibility rules; some limited exceptions apply. Players may hold more than one non-FIFA nationality.

No.	Pos.	Nation	Player
—	GK	CHI	Nelson Tapia
—	GK	BRA	Mauro
—	GK	BRA	Júlio Sérgio
—	DF	BRA	André Luís
—	DF	BRA	Leonardo
—	DF	BRA	Domingos
—	DF	BRA	Ávalos
—	DF	BRA	Antônio Carlos
—	DF	BRA	Paulo César
—	DF	BRA	Flávio
—	DF	BRA	Léo
—	DF	BRA	Márcio
—	MF	BRA	Fabinho

No.	Pos.	Nation	Player
—	MF	BRA	Preto Casagrande
—	MF	BRA	Zé Elias
—	MF	BRA	Ricardo Bóvio
—	MF	BRA	Narciso
—	MF	BRA	Elano
—	MF	BRA	Ricardinho
—	MF	BRA	Marcinho
—	MF	BRA	Luis Augusto
—	FW	BRA	Robinho
—	FW	BRA	Deivid
—	FW	BRA	Basílio
—	FW	BRA	William

Source: Terra Esportes

=== Appearances and goals ===
Pos.	Name	Campeonato Brasileiro		Campeonato Paulista		Copa Libertadores		Copa Sudamericana		Total	
Pos.	Name	Apps	Goals	Apps	Goals	Apps	Goals	Apps	Goals	Apps	Goals
GK	(Brazil) Júlio Sérgio	7	0	4	0	5	0	0	0	16	0
GK	(Brazil) Mauro	22	0	1	0	0	0	8	0	31	0
GK	(Chile) Tapia	17(1)	0	0	0	0	0	0	0	18	0
DF	(Brazil) André Luís	39	1	11	1	10	0	3(1)	0	64	2
DF	(Brazil) Antônio Carlos	7	0	0	0	0	0	1	0	8	0
DF	(Brazil) Ávalos	18(2)	1	0	0	0	0	7	0	27	1
DF	(Brazil) Domingos	15(5)	1	0	0	0	0	4(1)	0	25	1
DF	(Brazil) Flávio	8(6)	0	0	0	0	0	4	0	18	0
DF	(Brazil) Lelo	0(7)	0	0	0	0	0	2(1)	0	10	0
DF	(Brazil) Leonardo	10	0	0	0	0	0	3	0	13	0
DF	(Brazil) Léo	44	3	13	2	8	0	3(2)	0	70	5
DF	(Brazil) Márcio	0(2)	0	0	0	0	0	7	0	9	0
DF	(Brazil) Narciso	2	0	0	0	0	0	0	0	2	0
DF	(Brazil) Paulo César	34(2)	1	10	1	8(1)	0	1(2)	0	58	2
MF	(Brazil) Bóvio	16(9)	0	0	0	0	0	4(1)	0	30	0
MF	(Brazil) Elano	41	15	7(1)	2	8	2	2(2)	3	61	22
MF	(Brazil) Fabinho	28	1	0	0	0	0	3	0	31	1
MF	(Brazil) Luís Augusto	2(16)	0	0(4)	0	1(2)	0	5	0	30	0
MF	(Brazil) Marcinho	3(25)	0	0	0	0	0	7(1)	1	36	1
MF	(Brazil) Preto Casagrande	17(7)	3	2(2)	0	2(4)	1	5(1)	1	40	5
MF	(Brazil) Ricardinho	37	10	0	0	0	0	1(2)	0	40	10
MF	(Brazil) Zé Elias	6(5)	0	0	0	0	0	5	0	16	0
FW	(Brazil) Basílio	15(25)	15	10(3)	6	4(3)	5	5(1)	3	66	29
FW	(Brazil) Deivid	40(1)	22	0	0	3	0	1(3)	1	48	26
FW	(Brazil) Luizinho	0(2)	0	0(1)	0	0	0	0	0	3	0
FW	(Brazil) Robinho	35(2)	21	10	7	8	4	2	0	57	32
FW	(Brazil) William	1(5)	2	0	0	0	0	6(1)	2	13	4
Players who left the club during the season
GK	(Brazil) Doni	0	0	8	0	5	0	0	0	13	0
DF	(Brazil) Alcides	1(1)	0	0(2)	0	1(1)	0	0	0	6	0
DF	(Brazil) Alex	4	0	9	1	5	1	0	0	18	2
DF	(Brazil) Marco Aurélio	4	0	2(1)	0	3(2)	0	0	0	12	0
DF	(Brazil) Pereira	2(2)	0	5(2)	0	4(2)	0	0	0	17	0
MF	(Brazil) Claiton	8(1)	1	11(1)	0	7(2)	0	0	0	30	1
MF	(Brazil) Daniel Paulista	1(1)	0	2(1)	0	0(1)	0	0	0	6	0
MF	(Brazil) Diego	7(2)	4	10	0	9	4	0	0	28	8
MF	(Brazil) Jerri	0	0	0(3)	2	0	0	0	0	3	2
MF	(Brazil) Lopes	2(4)	0	0(6)	0	0(5)	1	0	0	17	1
MF	(Brazil) Paulo Almeida	6	0	4(3)	0	5(4)	0	0	0	22	0
MF	(Brazil) Renato	5	0	13	4	9	1	0	0	24	5
FW	(Brazil) Leandro Machado	3(1)	0	0(1)	0	0(2)	0	0	0	7	0
FW	(Brazil) Róbson	0	0	11(2)	4	4	2	0	0	17	6

== Transfers ==
=== In ===
Pos.	Name	Moving from	Source
DF	(Brazil) Paulo César	(France) PSG	
GK	(Brazil) Mauro	(Brazil) Marília	
DF	(Brazil) Marco Aurélio	(Brazil) Naútico	
MF	(Brazil) Claiton	(Brazil) Internacional	
MF	(Brazil) Preto Casagrande	(Brazil) Bahia	
FW	(Brazil) Róbson	(Japan) Oita Trinita	
FW	(Brazil) Basílio	(Brazil) Marília	
DF	(Brazil) Lelo	(Brazil) Portuguesa	
GK	(Brazil) Doni	(Brazil) Corinthians	
MF	(Brazil) Lopes	(Brazil) Fluminense	
DF	(Brazil) Alcides	(Germany) Schalke 04	
FW	(Brazil) Leandro Machado	(Mexico) Querétaro	
MF	(Brazil) Ricardinho	(England) Middlesbrough	
DF	(Brazil) Flávio	(Russia) Chernomorets	
MF	(Brazil) Ricardo Bóvio	(Russia) Chernomorets	
GK	(Chile) Nelson Tapia	(Chile) Cobreloa	
MF	(Brazil) Marcinho	(Brazil) CRB	
FW	(Brazil) Deivid	(France) Girondins de Bordeaux	
DF	(Brazil) Antônio Carlos	(Turkey) Beşiktaş	
MF	(Brazil) Zé Elias	(Italy) Genoa	
DF	(Brazil) Márcio	(Brazil) Juventus	
MF	(Brazil) Élton	(Brazil) Grêmio	
MF	(Brazil) Fabinho	(Japan) Shimizu S-Pulse	
DF	(Brazil) Ávalos	(South Korea) Suwon Samsung Bluewings	

=== Out ===
Pos.	Name	Moving to	Source	Notes
FW	(Brazil) Val Baiano	(Brazil) Brasiliense		
DF	(Brazil) Reginaldo Araújo	(Brazil) Flamengo		
MF	(Brazil) Alexandre	(Russia) Saturn		
DF	(Brazil) Neném	(Brazil) Bahia		
MF	(Brazil) Adiel	(Kuwait) Al Qadisiya		
DF	(Brazil) Rubens Cardoso	(Brazil) Atlético Mineiro		
GK	(Brazil) Fábio Costa	(Brazil) Corinthians		
MF	(Brazil) Wellington	(Brazil) Internacional		
MF	(Brazil) Jerri	(Brazil) Figueirense		On loan
GK	(Brazil) Doni	Free agent		
DF	(Brazil) Pereira	(Brazil) Vasco		On loan
DF	(Brazil) Alex	(Netherlands) PSV Eindhoven		
DF	(Brazil) Marco Aurélio	Free agent		
FW	(Brazil) Leandro Machado	Free agent		
DF	(Brazil) Alcides	(England) Chelsea		
MF	(Brazil) Renato	(Spain) Sevilla		
MF	(Brazil) Diego	(Portugal) Porto		
MF	(Brazil) Paulo Almeida	(Portugal) Benfica		
DF	(Brazil) Claiton	(Japan) Nagoya		
MF	(Brazil) Lopes	(Brazil) Juventude		
MF	(Brazil) Daniel Paulista	Free agent		
FW	(Brazil) Róbson	Free agent		

== Competitions ==
=== Overview ===
Competition	Started round	Final position / round	First match	Last match
Campeonato Brasileiro	–	1st	21 April 2004	19 December 2004
Campeonato Paulista	Group Stage	Semi-finals	21 January 2004	3 April 2004
Copa Libertadores	Group Stage	Quarter-finals	5 February 2004	27 May 2004
Copa Sudamericana	Brazil Preliminary	Quarter-finals	25 August 2004	10 November 2004

Source: Competitions

=== Detailed overall summary ===
	Total	Home	Away
Games played	77	39	38
Games won	43	28	15
Games drawn	16	7	9
Games lost	18	4	14
Biggest win	8–3 v União São João	8–3 v União São João	4–0 Ponte Preta
Biggest loss	0–4 v Paulista; 0–4 v São Caetano; 0–4 v Palmeiras	0–4 v Palmeiras	0–4 v Paulista; 0–4 v São Caetano
Clean sheets	21	15	6
Goals scored	166	102	64
Goals conceded	100	37	63
Goal difference	+66	+65	+1
Average GF per game	2.15	2.61	1.68
Average GC per game	1.29	0.94	1.68
Most appearances	Léo (69)	Léo (37)	Léo and André Luís (32)
Top scorer	Robinho (32)	Robinho (21)	Basílio (13)
Points	145/231 (62.77%)	91/117 (77.77%)	54/114 (47.36%)
Winning rate	51.38%	58.33%	44.44%

=== Campeonato Brasileiro ===
==== League table ====
Pos	Team	Pld	W	D	L	GF	GA	GD	Pts	Qualification or relegation
1	Santos	46	27	8	11	103	58	+45	89	Qualified for the 2005 Copa Libertadores
2	Atlético Paranaense	46	25	11	10	93	56	+37	86	Qualified for the 2005 Copa Libertadores
3	São Paulo	46	24	10	12	78	43	+35	82	Qualified for the 2005 Copa Libertadores
4	Palmeiras	46	22	13	11	72	47	+25	79	Qualified for the 2005 Copa Libertadores
5	Corinthians	46	20	14	12	54	54	0	74	Qualified for the 2005 Copa Sudamericana

==== Results summary ====
Overall								Home						Away					
Pld	W	D	L	GF	GA	GD	Pts	W	D	L	GF	GA	GD	W	D	L	GF	GA	GD
46	27	8	11	103	58	+45	89	18	2	3	64	23	+41	9	6	8	39	35	+4

==== Results by round ====
Round	1	2	3	4	5	6	7	8	9	10	11	12	13	14	15	16	17	18	19	20	21	22	23	24	25	26	27	28	29	30	31	32	33	34	35	36	37	38	39	40	41	42	43	44	45	46
Ground	A	H	A	H	H	A	H	A	A	H	H	A	A	H	H	A	H	A	H	H	A	H	A	H	A	H	A	A	H	A	H	H	A	A	H	H	A	A	H	A	H	A	A	H	A	H
Result	L	W	L	L	W	L	L	D	W	W	W	W	W	W	W	L	W	D	W	W	L	L	W	W	L	W	D	W	D	W	W	W	L	W	D	W	L	D	W	D	W	W	D	W	W	W
Position	15	9	13	17	11	16	18	19	14	11	10	7	4	3	1	2	1	1	1	1	1	1	1	1	2	1	1	1	1	1	1	1	2	2	2	2	2	1	1	2	2	2	2	2	1	1

Source: Futpédia
A = Away; H = Home; W = Win; D = Draw; L = Loss

==== Matches ====
21 April 1	Paraná Clube	3–2	Santos	Curitiba
21:45	Galvão 1'; Carlinhos 43'; Chokito 78'	Report	26' Léo; 82' Robinho	Stadium: Pinheirão; Referee: Giuliano Bozzano

25 April 2	Santos	2–0	Botafogo	Santos
18:00	Diego 55', 72'	Report		Stadium: Vila Belmiro; Referee: Wilson de Souza Mendonça

28 April 3	Figueirense	2–1	Santos	Santa Catarina
21:45	Fernandes 14'; Sérgio Manoel 85'	Report	29' Robinho	Stadium: Orlando Scarpelli; Referee: Alicio Pena Júnior

2 May 4	Santos	1–3	Cruzeiro	Santos
16:00	Diego 62' (pen.)	Report	20' Cris; 57', 90+2' Dudu	Stadium: Vila Belmiro; Referee: Leonardo Gaciba

8 May 5	Santos	2–1	Juventude	Santos
16:00	Basílio 35'; Deivid 87' (pen.)	Report	38' Thiago Silva	Stadium: Vila Belmiro; Referee: Heber Roberto Lopes

15 May 6	Atlético Paranaense	1–0	Santos	Curitiba
16:00	Washington 72'	Report		Stadium: Arena da Baixada; Referee: Edílson Soares da Silva

23 May 7	Santos	0–4	Palmeiras	Santos
16:00		Report	13', 63' Vágner Love; 32' (pen.) Muñoz; 76' Élson	Stadium: Vila Belmiro; Referee: Wilson Seneme

30 May 8	Atlético Mineiro	3–3	Santos	Belo Horizonte
16:00	Alessandro 26'; Alex Mineiro 36'; Dejair 72'	Report	17' Diego; 60' Elano; 67' Deivid	Stadium: Mineirão; Referee: Wagner Tardelli Azevedo

13 June 9	Vitória	1–2	Santos	Salvador
18:00	Enílton 90'	Report	28' Claiton; 86' Basílio	Stadium: Barradão; Referee: Edílson Soares da Silva

20 June 10	Santos	3–0	Internacional	Santos
18:00	Robinho 12'; Basílio 81'; André Luís 89'	Report		Stadium: Vila Belmiro; Referee: Luís Antônio Silva Santos

26 June 11	Santos	2–1	Guarani	São Paulo
18:00	Deivid 25'; Paulo César 88'	Report	83' Netinho	Stadium: Pacaembu; Referee: Paulo César de Oliveira

4 July 12	Corinthians	2–3	Santos	São Paulo
16:00	Rogério 44'; Fabinho 90'	Report	7' Elano; 77' Basílio; 86' Deivid	Stadium: Pacaembu; Referee: Wilson Seneme

7 July 13	Ponte Preta	0–4	Santos	Campinas
21:45		Report	2' Elano; 67' Preto Casagrande; 70' Basílio; 73' Robinho	Stadium: Moisés Lucarelli; Referee: Cléber Wellington Abade

10 July 14	Santos	2–1	São Paulo	Santos
16:00	Deivid 77'; Ricardinho 90+1'	Report	24' Danilo	Stadium: Vila Belmiro; Referee: Luis Marcelo Vicentin Cansian

13 July 15	Santos	2–0	Flamengo	Santos
21:45	Robinho 80'; Basílio 87'	Report		Stadium: Vila Belmiro; Referee: Evandro Rogério Roman

17 July 16	Fluminense	1–0	Santos	Rio de Janeiro
18:00	Marcelo 56'	Report		Stadium: Maracanã; Referee: Leonardo Gaciba

20 July 17	Santos	5–2	Criciúma	Santos
21:45	Robinho 27', 67'; Elano 38'; Deivid 78'; Ricardinho 90+1'	Report	42' Reinaldo; 56' Geninho	Stadium: Vila Belmiro; Referee: Luciano Teotônio Almeida

24 July 18	Goiás	3–3	Santos	Goiânia
20:30	Cléber 18', 21'; Leandro 59'	Report	13' Robinho; 27' (o.g.) João Paulo; 35' Deivid	Stadium: Serra Dourada; Referee: Wagner Tardelli Azevedo

29 July 19	Santos	4–2	Coritiba	Santos
20:30	Deivid 12'; Elano 30', 52'; Basílio 43'	Report	9' Capixaba; 88' Aristizábal	Stadium: Vila Belmiro; Referee: Fabrício Neves Correa

1 August 20	Santos	6–0	Paysandu	Santos
16:00	Robinho 10', 44'; Elano 15'; Ricardinho 42'; Basílio 60'; Fabinho 83'	Report		Stadium: Vila Belmiro; Referee: Antonio Hora Filho

4 August 21	Grêmio	3–1	Santos	Porto Alegre
21:45	Cláudio Pitbull 9', 13'; Christian 50'	Report	62' Basílio	Stadium: Olímpico; Referee: Elvécio Zequeto

7 August 22	Santos	0–1	São Caetano	Santos
16:00		Report	1' Fabrício Carvalho	Stadium: Vila Belmiro; Referee: Edilson Pereira de Carvalho

11 August 23	Vasco	2–3	Santos	Rio de Janeiro
21:45	Ygor 2'; Petkovic 15'	Report	4', 68' Deivid; 72' Robinho	Stadium: São Januário; Referee: Leonardo Gaciba

15 August 24	Santos	5–1	Paraná Clube	Santos
18:00	Robinho 2', 62'; Léo 31'; Basílio 41', 90+1'	Report	74' Cristian	Stadium: Vila Belmiro; Referee: Edílson Soares da Silva

18 August 25	Botafogo	2–0	Santos	Niterói
21:45	João Carlos 58'; Jorginho Paulista 87'	Report		Stadium: Caio Martins; Referee: Evandro Rogério Roman

22 August 26	Santos	4–1	Figueirense	Mogi Mirim
15:300	Elano 7'; Robinho 20', 76'; Deivid 48'	Report	31' Izaías	Stadium: Romildão; Referee: Luiz Antônio Silva Santos

29 August 27	Cruzeiro	4–4	Santos	Belo Horizonte
18:00	Fred 30', 65'; Jussiê 83'; Wendel 87'	Report	13', 20' Robinho; 58' Deivid; 63' Elano	Stadium: Mineirão; Referee: Carlos Eugênio Simon

1 September 28	Juventude	1–2	Santos	Caxias do Sul
21:50	Naldo 25'	Report	11' Elano; 88' Ricardinho	Stadium: Alfredo Jaconi; Referee: Cléver Assunção Gonçalves

8 September 29	Santos	1–1	Atlético Paranaense	Santos
21:50	Basílio 49'	Report	47' Marinho	Stadium: Vila Belmiro; Referee: Edílson Soares da Silva

12 September 30	Palmeiras	1–2	Santos	São Paulo
16:00	Osmar 82'	Report	40' Deivid; 45' Elano	Stadium: Pacaembu; Referee: Rodrigo Martins Cintra

18 September 31	Santos	2–0	Atlético Mineiro	Santos
18:00	Domingos 7'; Elano 56'	Report		Stadium: Vila Belmiro; Referee: Luís Antônio Silva Santos

26 September 32	Santos	4–1	Vitória	Santos
18:00	Elano 49'; Robinho 62', 90+2'; Ricardinho 88'	Report	47' Obina	Stadium: Vila Belmiro; Referee: Wilson de Souza Mendonça

29 September 33	Internacional	2–1	Santos	Porto Alegre
21:50	Vinicius 67'; Fernandão 73'	Report	34' Elano	Stadium: Beira Rio; Referee: Edílson Soares da Silva

2 October 34	Guarani	0–1	Santos	Campinas
18:00		Report	62' Deivid	Stadium: Brinco de Ouro; Referee: Paulo César de Oliveira

6 October 35	Santos	1–1	Corinthians	Santos
21:50	Preto Casagrande 22'	Report	45' Edson	Stadium: Vila Belmiro; Referee: Sálvio Spínola Fagundes Filho

16 October 36	Santos	4–0	Ponte Preta	Santos
18:00	Deivid 11'; Preto Casagrande 22'; Ricardinho 58', 63'	Report		Stadium: Vila Belmiro; Referee: Silvia Regina de Oliveira

24 October 37	São Paulo	1–0	Santos	São Paulo
16:00	Grafite 31'	Report		Stadium: Morumbi; Referee: Wilson Seneme

27 October 38	Flamengo	1–1	Santos	Rio de Janeiro
21:50	Jean 27'	Report	30' Deivid	Stadium: Maracanã; Referee: Leonardo Gaciba

30 October 39	Santos	5–0	Fluminense	São José do Rio Preto
16:00	Robinho 7', 55'; Laerte 19' (o.g.); Deivid 47', 81'	Report		Stadium: Benedito Teixeira; Referee: Clever Assunção Gonçalves

7 November 40	Criciúma	1–1	Santos	Criciúma
16:00	Ângelo 8'	Report	6' Deivid	Stadium: Heriberto Hülse; Referee: Elvecio Zequeto

11 November 41	Santos	2–1	Goiás	Presidente Prudente
16:00	Basílio 84'; William 85'	Report	10' (pen.) Paulo Baier	Stadium: Eduardo José Farah; Referee: Luís Antonio Silva Santos

21 November 42	Coritiba	0–1	Santos	Curitiba
16:00		Report	64' Deivid	Stadium: Couto Pereira; Referee: Wagner Tardelli Azevedo

28 November 43	Paysandu	1–1	Santos	Belém
16:00	Alonso 7'	Report	80' William	Stadium: Mangueirão; Referee: Wilson de Souza Mendonça

5 December 44	Santos	5–1	Grêmio	São José do Rio Preto
16:00	Ricardinho 7' (pen.), 26'; Ávalos 12'; Deivid 28'; Basílio 71'	Report	22' Baloy	Stadium: Benedito Teixeira; Referee: Edílson Soares da Silva

12 December 45	São Caetano	0–3	Santos	São Caetano do Sul
16:00		Report	31' Elano; 52' (pen.) Ricardinho; 61' Basílio	Stadium: Anacleto Campanella; Referee: Rodrigo Martins Cintra

19 December 46	Santos	2–1	Vasco	São José do Rio Preto
16:00	Ricardinho 5'; Elano 30'	Report	61' Marco Brito	Stadium: Benedito Teixeira; Referee: Leonardo Gaciba

=== Campeonato Paulista ===
==== Results summary ====
Overall								Home						Away					
Pld	W	D	L	GF	GA	GD	Pts	W	D	L	GF	GA	GD	W	D	L	GF	GA	GD
13	8	3	2	31	20	+11	27	5	2	0	22	9	+13	3	1	2	9	11	−2

==== Group stage ====
Pos	Team	Pld	W	D	L	GF	GA	GD	Pts
1	Santos	10	7	2	1	27	13	+14	23
2	Paulista	10	7	1	2	24	17	+7	22
3	Palmeiras	10	6	2	2	25	13	+12	20
4	São Caetano	10	5	4	1	17	10	+7	19
5	Santo André	10	5	2	3	20	19	+1	17

21 January 1	Oeste	0–1	Santos	Itápolis
		Report	44' Jerri	Stadium: Amaros; Referee: Sálvio Spínola Fagundes Filho

25 January 2	Santos	1–1	São Caetano	Santos
	Basílio 35'	Report	34' Fábio Santos	Stadium: Vila Belmiro; Referee: Wilson Seneme

28 January 3	Santos	4–0	Mogi Mirim	Santos
	Elano 10'; Robinho 20'; Léo 64'; Jerri 87'	Report		Stadium: Vila Belmiro; Referee: Cleber Wellington Abade

1 February 4	Palmeiras	2–2	Santos	São Paulo
	Magrão 6'; Vágner Love 28'	Report	59' Robinho; 82' Renato	Stadium: Morumbi; Referee: Paulo Cesar de Oliveira

8 February 5	Santo André	1–3	Santos	Santo André
	Jean Carlos 15'	Report	40' Robinho; 55', 84' Basílio	Stadium: Bruno José Daniel; Referee: Luís Marcelo Cancian

15 February 6	Santos	8–3	União São João	Santos
	Basílio 4', 20'; Paulo César 25'; André Luís 31'; Alex 35'; Robinho 51'; Róbson 56' (pen.); Renato 87'	Report	39' Osmar; 45+1' Marcelinho; 77' João Paulo	Stadium: Vila Belmiro; Referee: Romildo Correia

21 February 7	Santos	3–1	Marília	São Paulo
	Robinho 12', 59'; Renato 88'	Report	20' Éder	Stadium: Parque Antártica; Referee: Sílvia Regina de Oliveira

25 February 8	Paulista	4–0	Santos	Jundiaí
	Umberto 1'; João Paulo 17'; Canindé 35'; Izaías 78'	Report		Stadium: Jayme Cintra; Referee: Paulo Cesar de Oliveira

7 March 9	Guarani	0–3	Santos	Campinas
		Report	20' Elano; 51', 61' Róbson	Stadium: Brinco de Ouro; Referee: Paulo José Danelon

14 March 10	Santos	2–1	Ituano	Santos
	Renato 5'; Róbson 68'	Report	43' Jabá	Stadium: Vila Belmiro; Referee: Eduardo César Conrado Coelho

==== Knockout stage ====
===== Quarter-final =====
20 March	Santos	1–0	União Barbarense	Santos
	Léo 48'	Report		Stadium: Vila Belmiro; Referee: Elcio Borborema

===== Semi-finals =====
28 March 1st leg	Santos	3–3	São Caetano	Santos
	Basílio 54'; Gustavo 62' (o.g.); Robinho 82'	Report	34' (o.g.) André Luís; 44' Warley; 86' Mineiro	Stadium: Vila Belmiro; Referee: Wilson Seneme

3 April 2nd leg	São Caetano	4–0	Santos	São Caetano do Sul
	Euller 39'; Fabrício Carvalho 52'; Marcinho 74', 90'	Report		Stadium: Anacleto Campanella; Referee: Sálvio Spínola Fagundes Filho

=== Copa Libertadores ===
==== Group stage ====
Pos	Team	Pld	W	D	L	GF	GA	GD	Pts
1	(Brazil) Santos	6	5	1	0	16	6	+10	16
2	(Ecuador) Barcelona	6	2	2	2	9	6	+3	8
3	(Paraguay) Guaraní	6	1	3	2	6	7	−1	6
4	(Bolivia) Jorge Wilstermann	6	0	2	4	5	17	−12	2

5 February 1	Jorge Wilstermann (Bolivia)	2–3	(Brazil) Santos	Cochabamba, Bolívia
19:30	Túlio 39'; Marín 76'	Report	16', 25' Basílio; 87' Alex	Stadium: Estadio Félix Capriles; Referee: (Argentina) Héctor Baldassi

18 February 2	Santos (Brazil)	2–2	(Paraguay) Guaraní	Santos, Brazil
21:45	Róbson 2'; Lopes 90+2'	Report	65', 85' Díaz	Stadium: Vila Belmiro; Attendance: 8,587; Referee: (Uruguay) Sérgio Konjetam

3 March 3	Barcelona (Ecuador)	1–3	(Brazil) Santos	Guayaquil, Ecuador
22:00	Teixeira 65'	Report	44' Renato; 49' Basílio; 83' Robinho	Stadium: Isidro Romero; Referee: (Argentina) Claudio Martin

11 March 4	Santos (Brazil)	1–0	(Ecuador) Barcelona	Santos, Brazil
19:00	Robinho 69'	Report		Stadium: Vila Belmiro; Attendance: 16,296; Referee: (Argentina) Horacio Elizondo

25 March 5	Guaraní (Paraguay)	1–2	(Brazil) Santos	Asunción, Paraguay
21:15	Manzur 71'	Report	50' Basílio; 64' (pen.) Róbson	Stadium: Rogelio Livieres; Referee: (Argentina) Sergio Pezzotta

15 April 6	Santos (Brazil)	5–0	(Bolivia) Jorge Wilstermann	Santos, Brazil
22:00	Diego 20' (pen.), 53'; Elano 41'; Preto Casagrande 55'; Robinho 88' (pen.)	Report		Stadium: Vila Belmiro; Attendance: 12,319; Referee: (Uruguay) Jorge Larrionda

==== Knockout stage ====
===== Round of 16 =====
5 May 1st leg	LDU (Ecuador)	4–2	(Brazil) Santos	Quito, Ecuador
23:50	Ambrosi 17', 72'; Urrutia 47'; Salas 84'	Report	2' Robinho; 4' Elano	Stadium: Casa Blanca; Referee: (Colombia) Oscar Ruíz

11 May 2nd leg	Santos (Brazil)	2–0 (4 – 4 agg.) (5 – 3 p)	(Ecuador) LDU	Santos, Brazil
18:30	Diego 2', 50'	Report		Stadium: Vila Belmiro; Attendance: 18,221; Referee: (Paraguay) Carlos Amarilla
	Penalties
	Robinho (penalty scored); Leandro Machado (penalty scored); Preto Casagrande (penalty scored); Paulo César (penalty scored); Léo (penalty scored)		(penalty scored) Aguinaga; (penalty missed) Obregón; (penalty scored) Salas; (penalty scored) Reasco

===== Quarter-finals =====
19 May 1st leg	Santos (Brazil)	1–1	(Colombia) Once Caldas	Santos, Brazil
21:45	Basílio 84'	Report	88' Valentierra	Stadium: Vila Belmiro; Attendance: 12,855; Referee: (Argentina) Claudio Martin

27 May 2nd leg	Once Caldas (Colombia)	1–0 (2 – 1 agg.)	(Brazil) Santos	Manizales, Colombia
21:30	Valentierra 71'	Report		Stadium: Palogrande; Referee: (Argentina) Horacio Elizondo

=== Copa Sudamericana ===
==== First round ====
25 August 1st leg	Paraná Clube (Brazil)	2–1	(Brazil) Santos	Curitiba, Brazil
	Fernando 30'; Maranhão 58'	Report	37' Marcinho	Stadium: Vila Capanema; Referee: (Brazil) Álvaro Quelhas

4 September 2nd leg	Santos (Brazil)	3–0 (4 – 2 agg.)	(Brazil) Paraná Clube	Santos, Brazil
	Elano 43'; Basílio 59'; William 68'	Report		Stadium: Vila Belmiro; Referee: (Brazil) Alício Pena Júnior

==== Second round ====
15 September 1st leg	Santos (Brazil)	0–0	(Brazil) Flamengo	Santos, Brazil
		Report		Stadium: Vila Belmiro; Referee: (Brazil) Wilson Souza Mendonça

22 September 2nd leg	Flamengo (Brazil)	2–2 (2 – 2 agg.) (4–5 p)	(Brazil) Santos	Volta Redonda, Brazil
	Ibson 40', 41'	Report	39' Basílio; 90+2' Deivid	Stadium: Raulino de Oliveira; Referee: (Brazil) Héber Roberto Lopes
	Penalties
	Júnior (penalty scored); China (penalty scored); Júnior Baiano (penalty scored); Dill (penalty missed); Felipe (penalty scored); André Bahia (penalty missed)		(penalty scored) Ricardinho; (penalty missed) Deivid; (penalty scored) Paulo César; (penalty scored) Basílio; (penalty scored) Robinho; (penalty scored) André Luís

==== Third round ====
10 October 1st leg	Santos (Brazil)	1–0	(Brazil) São Paulo	Santos, Brazil
	Elano 76'	Report		Stadium: Vila Belmiro; Referee: (Brazil) Carlos Eugênio Simon

20 October 2nd leg	São Paulo (Brazil)	1–1 (1 – 2 agg.)	(Brazil) Santos	São Paulo, Brazil
	Rodrigo 43'	Report	82' Preto Casagrande	Stadium: Morumbi; Referee: (Brazil) Wagner Tardelli

==== Quarter-finals ====
3 November 1st leg	LDU (Ecuador)	3–2	(Brazil) Santos	Quito, Ecuador
	Murillo 14'; Ambrosi 37'; Salas 84'	Report	20' William; 51' Basílio	Stadium: Casa Blanca; Referee: (Bolivia) René Ortubé

10 November 2nd leg	Santos (Brazil)	1–2 (3 – 5 agg.)	(Ecuador) LDU	Santos, Brazil
	Elano 83'	Report	7' Aguinaga; 88' Murillo	Stadium: Vila Belmiro; Referee: (Paraguay) Carlos Torres
