= 2008 J.League Division 1 =

16th season of J1 League

J.League Division 1
- Season: 2008
- Champions: Kashima Antlers; 6th J.League title 6th Japanese title
- Relegated: Tokyo Verdy; Consadole Sapporo
- Champions League: Kashima Antlers; Kawasaki Frontale; Nagoya Grampus; Gamba Osaka (all to the group stage)
- Matches: 306
- Goals: 783 (2.56 per match)
- Top goalscorer: Marquinhos (21 goals)
- Highest attendance: 61,246 (Round 1, Marinos vs. Reds)
- Lowest attendance: 6,125 (Round 23, Ardija vs. Marinos)
- Average attendance: 19,202

The 2008 J.League Division 1 season was the 44th season of the top-flight club football in Japan and the 16th season since the establishment of J.League Division 1. The season began on March 8 and ended on December 6.

A total of eighteen clubs participated in double round-robin format. Starting this season, top three clubs received automatic qualification to the following years' AFC Champions League. The bottom two clubs were relegated to J.League Division 2 by default, while 16th-placed club had to defend their spot in the top-flight in the pro/rele series.

== Clubs ==
Location of the clubs in Japan

The following 18 clubs participated in J.League Division 1 during 2008 season. Of these clubs, Consadole Sapporo, Tokyo Verdy, and Kyoto Purple Sanga are newly promoted clubs.

Club name	Home town(s)	Note(s)
Albirex Niigata	Niigata & Seirō, Niigata	
Consadole Sapporo	Sapporo, Hokkaido	Promoted from J2 League in 2007
FC Tokyo	Tokyo	
Gamba Osaka	Suita, Osaka	2008 ACL participant
JEF United Chiba	Chiba & Ichihara, Chiba	
Júbilo Iwata	Iwata, Shizuoka	
Kashima Antlers	Southwestern cities/towns of Ibaraki	2008 ACL participant Defending champions
Kashiwa Reysol	Kashiwa, Chiba	
Kawasaki Frontale	Kawasaki, Kanagawa	
Kyoto Purple Sanga	Southwestern cities/town in Kyoto	Promoted from J2 League in 2007
Nagoya Grampus	Nagoya, Aichi	Renamed from Nagoya Grampus Eight
Oita Trinita	All cities/towns in Ōita	
Omiya Ardija	Saitama	
Shimizu S-Pulse	Shizuoka	
Tokyo Verdy	Tokyo	Promoted from J2 League in 2007; Renamed from Tokyo Verdy 1969
Urawa Red Diamonds	Saitama	2008 ACL Participant
Vissel Kobe	Kobe, Hyōgo	
Yokohama F. Marinos	Yokohama & Yokosuka	

=== Personnel ===
Club	Head coach	Kit manufacturer	Shirt sponsor
Albirex Niigata	(Japan) Jun Suzuki	Adidas	Kameda Seika
Consadole Sapporo	(Japan) Toshiya Miura	Kappa	Nitori
FC Tokyo	(Japan) Hiroshi Jofuku	Adidas	Eneos
Gamba Osaka	(Japan) Akira Nishino	Umbro	Panasonic
JEF United Chiba	(Scotland) Alex Miller	Kappa	Fuji Electric
Júbilo Iwata	(Netherlands) Hans Ooft	Puma	Iida Sangyo
Kashima Antlers	(Brazil) Oswaldo de Oliveira	Nike	Tostem
Kashiwa Reysol	(Japan) Nobuhiro Ishizaki	Umbro	Hitachi
Kawasaki Frontale	(Japan) Tsutomu Takahata	Asics	Fujitsu
Kyoto Purple Sanga	(Japan) Hisashi Kato	CW-X	Kyocera
Nagoya Grampus	(Serbia) Dragan Stojković	Le Coq Sportif	Toyota
Oita Trinita	(Brazil) Péricles Chamusca	Puma	None
Omiya Ardija	(Japan) Yasuhiro Higuchi	Lotto	NTT Docomo
Shimizu S-Pulse	(Japan) Kenta Hasegawa	Puma	Suzuyo
Tokyo Verdy	(Japan) Tetsuji Hashiratani	Kappa	Ameba
Urawa Red Diamonds	(Germany) Gert Engels	Nike	SAVAS
Vissel Kobe	(Japan) Hiroshi Matsuda	Asics	Rakuten
Yokohama F. Marinos	(Japan) Kokichi Kimura	Nike	Nissan

=== Foreign players ===
Club	Player 1	Player 2	Player 3	Non-visa foreign	Type-C contract	Former players
Albirex Niigata	(Brazil) Alessandro	(Brazil) Davi	(Brazil) Márcio Richardes	(New Zealand) Michael Fitzgerald		(Brazil) Luís Augusto
Consadole Sapporo	(Brazil) Anderson	(Brazil) Claiton	(Brazil) Davi	(South Korea) Chong Yong-de		(Brazil) Alceu (Brazil) Edson (Brazil) Nonato
FC Tokyo	(Brazil) Bruno Quadros	(Brazil) Caboré	(Brazil) Emerson Paulista			
Gamba Osaka	(Brazil) Lucas Severino	(Brazil) Mineiro	(Brazil) Rôni			(Brazil) Baré
JEF United Chiba	(Australia) Eddy Bosnar	(Brazil) Michael	(Brazil) Reinaldo	(South Korea) Kim Dong-soo		(Bosnia and Herzegovina) Mirko Hrgović (South Korea) Park Jong-jin
Júbilo Iwata	(Brazil) Ferrugem	(Brazil) Gilsinho				
Kashima Antlers	(Brazil) Danilo	(Brazil) Marcinho	(Brazil) Marquinhos			
Kashiwa Reysol	(Brazil) Alex	(Brazil) França	(Brazil) Popó			
Kawasaki Frontale	(Brazil) Juninho	(Brazil) Renatinho	(Brazil) Vitor Júnior	(North Korea) Jong Tae-se		(Brazil) Hulk
Kyoto Purple Sanga	(Brazil) Ataliba	(Brazil) Fernandinho	(Brazil) Sidiclei		(Brazil) William Pinheiro	(Brazil) Paulinho
Nagoya Grampus	(Brazil) Magnum	(Norway) Frode Johnsen	(Serbia) Miloš Bajalica			
Oita Trinita	(Brazil) Edmilson Alves	(Brazil) Roberto	(Brazil) Ueslei			
Omiya Ardija	(Brazil) Dênis Marques	(Brazil) Leandro Euzébio	(Slovenia) Klemen Lavrič			(Brazil) Pedro Júnior
Shimizu S-Pulse	(Brazil) Marcos Aurélio	(Brazil) Marcos Paulo			(South Korea) Kim Dong-sub	(Brazil) Fernandinho
Tokyo Verdy	(Brazil) Diego Souza	(Brazil) Leandro		(Egypt) Osama Elsamni		(Brazil) Francismar (Brazil) Hulk
Urawa Red Diamonds	(Brazil) Edmílson	(Brazil) Robson Ponte				
Vissel Kobe	(Brazil) Leandro	(Brazil) Raphael Botti	(South Korea) Kim Nam-il	(South Korea) Park Kang-jo		
Yokohama F. Marinos	(Brazil) Lopes Tigrão	(South Korea) Kim Kun-hoan				(Brazil) Rôni

== Format ==
Eighteen clubs will play in double round-robin (home and away) format, a total of 34 games each. A club receives 3 points for a win, 1 point for a tie, and 0 points for a loss. The clubs are ranked by points, and tie breakers are, in the following order:

- Goal differential
- Goals scored
- Head-to-head results
- Disciplinary points

A draw would be conducted, if necessary. However, if two clubs are tied at the first place, both clubs will be declared as the champions. The bottom two clubs will be relegated to J2, while the 16th placed club plays a two-legged promotion/relegation Series. The champions of this season qualifies to the AFC Champions League and one to three more clubs may also qualify.

Changes from Previous Year

- Introduction of Disciplinary points for tie breaker (2008–)
- Top three clubs will qualify to AFC Champions League
- The J.League will not qualify to the abolished A3 Champions Cup.

== Table ==
Pos	Team	Pld	W	D	L	GF	GA	GD	Pts	Qualification or relegation
1	Kashima Antlers (C)	34	18	9	7	56	30	+26	63	Qualification for 2009 AFC Champions League Group stage
2	Kawasaki Frontale	34	18	6	10	65	42	+23	60	Qualification for 2009 AFC Champions League Group stage
3	Nagoya Grampus	34	17	8	9	48	35	+13	59	Qualification for 2009 AFC Champions League Group stage
4	Oita Trinita	34	16	8	10	33	24	+9	56	Qualification for Pan-Pacific Championship 2009 (Note: Qualified as the winner of 2008 J.League Cup.)
5	Shimizu S-Pulse	34	16	7	11	50	42	+8	55	
6	FC Tokyo	34	16	7	11	50	46	+4	55	
7	Urawa Red Diamonds	34	15	8	11	50	42	+8	53	
8	Gamba Osaka	34	14	8	12	46	49	−3	50	Qualification for 2009 AFC Champions League Group stage (Note: Qualified as the winner of 2008 Emperor's Cup.)
9	Yokohama F. Marinos	34	13	9	12	43	32	+11	48	
10	Vissel Kobe	34	12	11	11	39	38	+1	47	
11	Kashiwa Reysol	34	13	7	14	48	45	+3	46	
12	Omiya Ardija	34	12	7	15	36	45	−9	43	
13	Albirex Niigata	34	11	9	14	32	46	−14	42	
14	Kyoto Sanga	34	11	8	15	37	46	−9	41	
15	JEF United Chiba	34	10	8	16	36	53	−17	38	
16	Júbilo Iwata (O)	34	10	7	17	40	48	−8	37	2008 promotion/relegation series
17	Tokyo Verdy (R)	34	10	7	17	38	50	−12	37	Relegation to 2009 J.League Division 2
18	Consadole Sapporo (R)	34	4	6	24	36	70	−34	18	Relegation to 2009 J.League Division 2

Updated to match(es) played on December 6, 2008. Source: J. League Division 1
Rules for classification: 1) points; 2) goal difference; 3) number of goals scored.
(C) Champions; (O) Play-off winners; (R) Relegated

== Results ==
Home \ Away	ALB	ANT	ARD	CON	FRO	GAM	GRA	JEF	JÚB	REY	SAN	SSP	TOK	TRI	RED	VER	VIS	FMA
Albirex Niigata		0–2	2–2	2–1	2–1	3–2	2–1	2–2	1–0	2–1	1–0	3–0	2–3	0–1	0–1	0–0	3–2	0–0
Kashima Antlers	0–0		2–0	4–0	1–1	0–0	1–2	4–1	1–0	1–1	2–1	2–0	4–1	1–0	1–1	4–1	2–2	2–1
Omiya Ardija	2–0	1–1		1–2	2–1	2–0	1–2	2–1	1–2	0–4	1–1	0–0	0–3	2–0	0–1	2–0	0–2	1–0
Consadole Sapporo	0–1	0–1	1–2		0–2	3–3	1–3	2–3	2–1	0–2	1–2	2–2	1–2	0–0	1–2	1–3	1–1	1–2
Kawasaki Frontale	4–1	3–2	2–3	3–1		4–0	1–1	2–0	2–2	3–2	0–1	2–1	0–1	3–0	0–1	1–1	4–0	2–1
Gamba Osaka	2–2	0–0	2–3	4–2	2–1		0–1	0–0	2–1	2–1	1–0	2–0	1–3	0–1	1–0	2–1	1–1	2–2
Nagoya Grampus	2–0	0–4	4–0	3–1	1–2	1–2		3–2	0–0	1–0	1–1	3–2	0–1	2–1	1–1	1–1	0–0	2–0
JEF United Chiba	0–0	3–1	2–4	0–3	0–1	0–1	2–1		1–2	0–1	1–0	1–2	4–2	1–0	3–2	2–0	1–1	0–3
Júbilo Iwata	1–0	1–2	0–1	5–0	1–4	3–0	2–1	0–0		3–3	2–0	1–0	1–2	1–1	1–2	1–1	0–1	0–1
Kashiwa Reysol	0–0	1–1	1–0	1–2	2–5	1–0	2–1	1–1	2–0		2–2	0–2	0–1	0–2	2–1	5–1	3–0	1–3
Kyoto Sanga	1–0	2–1	2–1	1–0	1–2	1–2	2–3	0–1	2–0	0–1		1–3	1–1	1–1	0–4	0–0	2–1	1–0
Shimizu S-Pulse	3–0	1–0	0–0	3–1	2–0	3–1	0–2	3–2	1–1	3–2	2–1		1–0	1–2	1–2	1–0	0–1	1–1
FC Tokyo	1–0	3–2	3–1	1–0	4–2	1–1	0–1	1–1	5–1	0–1	3–3	1–5		1–0	0–1	1–2	1–1	1–1
Oita Trinita	3–1	0–1	1–0	3–2	0–0	1–2	0–0	0–0	2–1	2–0	1–0	2–2	1–0		2–0	2–0	1–0	1–0
Urawa Red Diamonds	3–0	2–0	0–0	4–2	1–3	2–3	0–2	3–0	3–1	2–2	2–2	1–2	2–0	0–0		3–2	0–1	1–6
Tokyo Verdy	4–0	0–2	1–0	1–1	0–2	1–3	2–0	3–0	1–2	2–1	0–1	4–1	1–2	0–2	1–1		0–2	3–2
Vissel Kobe	1–1	1–2	1–0	1–1	4–1	2–1	1–2	0–1	3–2	0–2	4–1	0–1	1–1	1–0	1–1	0–1		1–0
Yokohama F. Marinos	0–1	0–2	1–1	1–0	1–1	2–1	0–0	3–0	0–1	2–0	1–3	1–1	3–0	1–0	1–0	2–0	1–1	

Updated to match(es) played on December 6, 2008. Source: J. League Division 1
Legend: Blue = home team win; Yellow = draw; Red = away team win.

== Player statistics ==
=== Top scorers ===
Rank	Scorer	Club	Goals
1	(Brazil) Marquinhos	Kashima Antlers	21
2	(Brazil) Davi	Consadole Sapporo	16
3	(Japan) Atsushi Yanagisawa	Kyoto Sanga	14
3	(North Korea) Jong Tae-se	Kawasaki Frontale	14
5	(Brazil) Alessandro	Albirex Niigata	13
6	(Brazil) Juninho	Kawasaki Frontale	12
6	(Japan) Shingo Akamine	FC Tokyo	12
6	(Norway) Frode Johnsen	Nagoya Grampus	12

=== Top assists ===
Rank	Player	Club	Assists
1	(Japan) Yoshizumi Ogawa	Nagoya Grampus	12
2	(Japan) Kengo Nakamura	Kawasaki Frontale	11
2	(Japan) Kota Ueda	Júbilo Iwata	11
4	(Brazil) Juninho	Kawasaki Frontale	10
5	(Brazil) Claiton	Consadole Sapporo	9
6	(Brazil) Danilo	Kashima Antlers	8
6	(Japan) Akihiro Hyodo	Shimizu S-Pulse	8
6	(Japan) Yasuhito Endō	Gamba Osaka	8
9	(Brazil) Lucas Severino	Gamba Osaka	7
9	(Japan) Yoshito Ōkubo	Vissel Kobe	7

== Awards ==
=== Individual awards ===
Award	Recipient	Club
Most Valuable Player	(Brazil) Marquinhos	Kashima Antlers
Rookie of the Year	(Japan) Yoshizumi Ogawa	Nagoya Grampus
Manager of the Year	(Brazil) Oswaldo de Oliveira	Kashima Antlers
Top Scorer	(Brazil) Marquinhos	Kashima Antlers

=== Best Eleven ===
Pos	Footballer	Club	Nationality
GK	Seigo Narazaki	Nagoya Grampus	Japan
DF	Atsuto Uchida	Kashima Antlers	Japan
DF	Daiki Iwamasa	Kashima Antlers	Japan
DF	Marcus Tulio Tanaka	Nagoya Grampus	Japan
DF	Satoshi Yamaguchi	Gamba Osaka	Japan
DF	Yuji Nakazawa	Yokohama F. Marinos	Japan
MF	Kengo Nakamura	Kawasaki Frontale	Japan
MF	Yasuhito Endō	Gamba Osaka	Japan
MF	Yoshizumi Ogawa	Nagoya Grampus	Japan
FW	Marquinhos	Kashima Antlers	Brazil
FW	Atsushi Yanagisawa	Kyoto Sanga	Japan

== Attendances ==
Pos	Team	Total	High	Low	Average	Change
1	Urawa Red Diamonds	809,353	57,050	16,225	47,609	+2.0%
2	Albirex Niigata	586,325	40,359	22,740	34,490	−9.9%
3	FC Tokyo	437,176	37,154	17,122	25,716	+1.7%
4	Yokohama F. Marinos	402,593	61,246	9,583	23,682	−1.5%
5	Oita Trinita	345,481	31,744	9,376	20,322	+2.8%
6	Kashima Antlers	335,140	36,412	6,725	19,714	+21.4%
7	Kawasaki Frontale	298,597	21,952	10,884	17,565	+1.3%
8	Shimizu S-Pulse	282,190	20,330	13,855	16,599	+4.1%
9	Nagoya Grampus	281,442	34,436	7,353	16,555	+6.2%
10	Gamba Osaka	274,169	20,773	10,039	16,128	−7.5%
11	Júbilo Iwata	262,911	27,866	8,216	15,465	−5.5%
12	Tokyo Verdy	252,231	30,517	8,060	14,837	+102.5%^{†}
13	Consadole Sapporo	247,305	28,901	7,010	14,547	+20.1%^{†}
14	JEF United Chiba	239,436	17,152	8,694	14,084	−0.5%
15	Kyoto Sanga	232,671	19,680	8,192	13,687	+106.5%^{†}
16	Vissel Kobe	220,672	23,088	7,839	12,981	+4.2%
17	Kashiwa Reysol	209,229	36,785	7,474	12,308	−5.1%
18	Omiya Ardija	158,944	12,505	6,125	9,350	−18.4%
	League total	5,875,865	61,246	6,125	19,202	+0.7%

Updated to games played on December 6, 2008
Source: J. League Division 1
Notes:
^{†} Team played previous season in J2.
