= André Luís (footballer, born 1979) =

Brazilian footballer

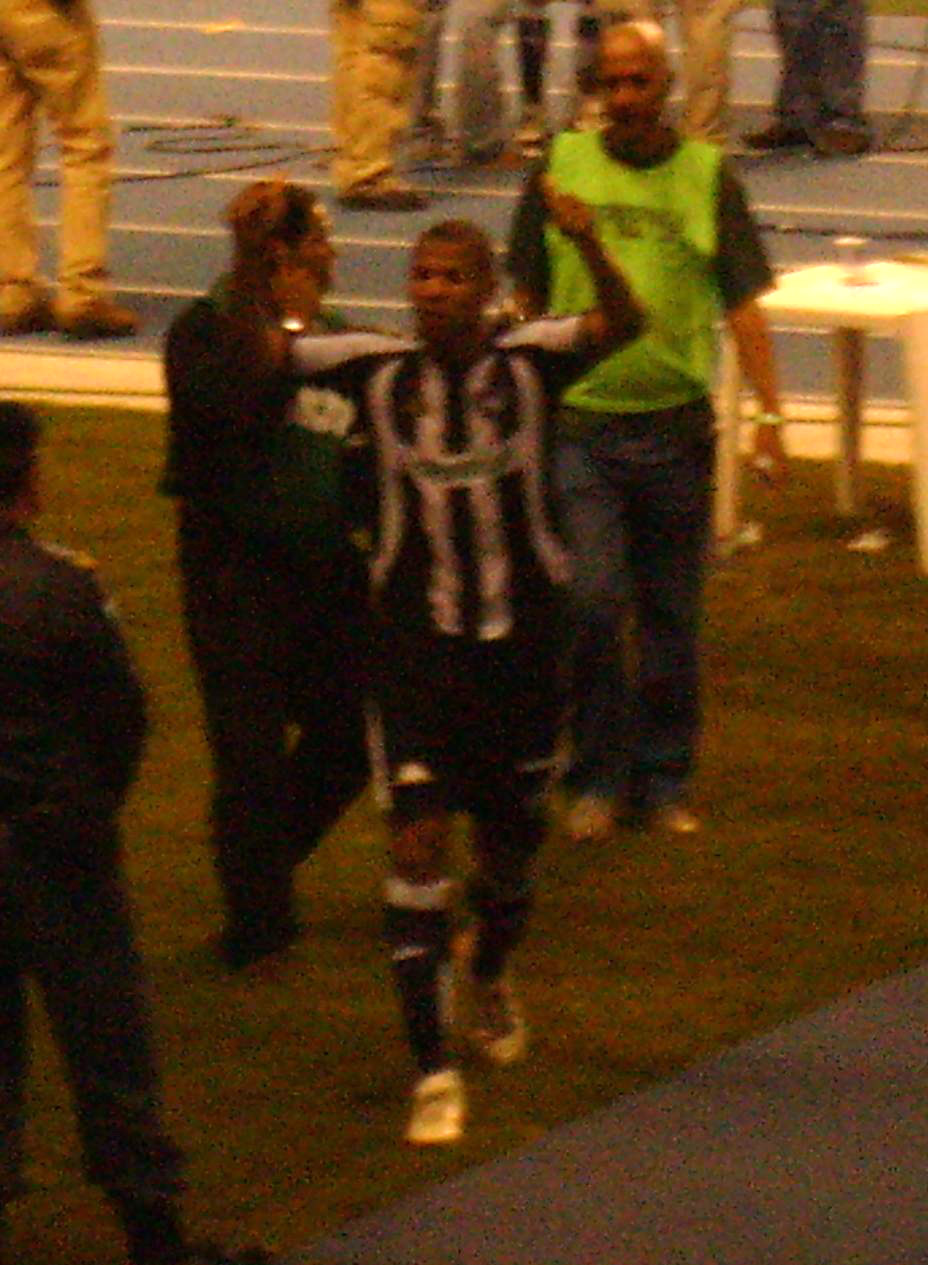
- Luís with Botafogo in 2008

Personal information
- Full name: André Luís Garcia
- Date of birth: 31 July 1979 (age 47)
- Place of birth: Porto Alegre, Brazil
- Height: 1.92 m (6 ft 3 1/2 in)
- Position: Centre back

Youth career
- –1998: Guarany de Bagé
- 1998–1999: Santos

Senior career*
Years	Team	Apps	(Gls)
2000–2004	Santos	140	(9)
2001	→ Fluminense (loan)	21	(4)
2005–2006	Benfica	1	(0)
2005–2006	→ Marseille (loan)	15	(0)
2006–2007	Cruzeiro	20	(1)
2008	Botafogo	38	(3)
2009	Grêmio Barueri	27	(2)
2010	São Paulo	6	(1)
2010–2011	Fluminense	22	(1)
2012	Portuguesa	1	(0)
2012	Grêmio Barueri	7	(1)
2013	Boa Esporte	2	(1)
2014	Brasiliense	4	(0)
2015	Mogi Mirim	6	(0)
2016	Brasiliense	14	(0)
2017	Taboão da Serra	17	(1)
2017	Hercílio Luz	12	(1)
2018	Taboão da Serra	13	(1)
2018	Almirante Barroso	0	(0)
2019	Concórdia	11	(0)
Total		377	(26)

International career
2000	Brazil U23	2	(1)
- * Club domestic league appearances and goals

André Luís Garcia (born 31 July 1979) is a Brazilian retired footballer who played as a centre back.

Starting at Santos, he made over 200 appearances for them, winning two league titles, in 2002 and 2004. He moved to Benfica in 2005, but the spell in Europe was largely unsuccessful and he returned to Brazil in 2006, to join Cruzeiro.

He represented them until December 2007, when he moved to Botafogo, having a controversial stint there. He remained a top tier until 2010, when he helped Fluminense win the Brasileirão. After Fluminense, Luís became a journeyman and passed through several clubs.

== Career ==
=== Santos ===
Born in Porto Alegre, but raised in Bagé, Luís spent the majority of his youth career in his home-town club, Guarany. At age 19, he moved to Santos, where he made his professional debut on 22 March 2000, in 7–2 win against Araçatuba, for the Campeonato Paulista. He quickly gained a place in the starting eleven, leading to a call-up to represent Brazil in the 2000 Summer Olympics. However a year later, a compromising performance in the semifinal of the Campeonato Paulista with Corinthians, cost him his place at Santos and he was loaned out to Fluminense for the remainder of the season. At Fluminense, Luís regained his best form and helped them finish third in the Brasileirão, as Santos recalled him back. The following year, he partnered with Alex to help Santos win their first league title since 1968. His partnership with Alex was dubbed by the media as Twin Towers, due to their high stature. In 2003, Luís was part of the first Santos team to reach the Copa Libertadores Finals since 1963; losing it to Boca Juniors. Domestically, he won his second league title in 2004, starting in 39 games and partnering with either Domingos or Ávalos.

=== Benfica ===
In September 2004, the media started speculating about a potential move to Europe in the next transfer window. Atlético Madrid enquired about his situation, but was Benfica who pressed harder. After three months of negotiations, Luís signed a three-year contract with Benfica, leaving Santos with over 200 appearances. Arriving at Benfica with the season in progress, he found it difficult to get some playing time, with Luisão and Ricardo Rocha being the preferred centre-backs of Giovanni Trapattoni. Despite a positive debut in the Portuguese Cup semi-final against Estrela da Amadora, Luís only played once in the Primeira Liga, when he replaced a suspended Luisão in a visit to Penafiel on 7 May. According to Record, his league debut was disappointing, because he allowed N'Doye to score the winning goal for Penafiel. After the season ended, he complained about his low playing time and said: "I will look for a club where I can play. To stay like this I rather not return". In July, Luís moved to Olympique de Marseille in season-long loan, with a buyout clause set at €6 million. At the end of season, Marseille opted not to exercise their buyout clause and he returned to Benfica.

=== Cruzeiro ===
Out of the plans for the new season, on 31 August 2006, Benfica sold him to Cruzeiro for a fee rumoured to be €1.5 million. He made his debut for Cruzeiro on 17 September, in a one-nil win against Palmeiras, and quickly established himself in the first team. However, in March 2007, Luís attracted some controversy, when he first attacked André from América Mineiro, and a few days later, head-butted a referee in a match with Ipatinga. Despite facing a penalty of 240 days of suspension, Cruzeiro managed to reduce the sentence to just four games. This controversy affected his chances at Cruzeiro, and he missed the entire Brasileirão. In December, he rescinded his contract with Cruzeiro, and signed a one-year deal with Botafogo.

=== Botafogo ===
His first game for Botafogo was on 9 March 2008 with Volta Redonda, and his first goal was in the next match with Duque de Caxias. However, he soon got into more controversy. In a match with Náutico on 1 June 2008, Luís, already booked, made a tackle on Ruy and was sent-off. As he left the pitch towards his bench, he insulted Náutico's fans and kicked a bottle of Gatorade towards them. He was reprimanded by a police officer, which he responded by insulting her. The officer tried to put him under arrest and major brawl started, with Luís escaping for the locker-room, where barricaded himself. He was eventually arrested and brought to the police station, where he negotiated his release after paying 25 minimum wages to a cancer hospital. Five months later, he was again involved in another controversy; on a Copa Sudamericana match with Estudiantes de La Plata and after making a tackle, referee Carlos Chandía showed him a yellow card, when Luís took it out of his hands and showed it to Chandia instead, when Luis gave it back Carlps gave him a red card and send him off. He received a 6 match suspension from the CONMEBOL.

=== Barueri and Fluminense ===
Luís left Botafogo in December 2008 and spent four months without club, until he joined Grêmio Barueri on 28 April 2009, as the club made their top tier debut. After helping Barueri finish 11th, the 30-year old traded clubs, signing a one-year deal with São Paulo. His spell at São Paulo was short lived, as he moved to Fluminense in May 2010, signing a three-year contract. At the end of 2011, Luís saw his contract unilaterally terminated, for "unacceptable behaviour" after he missed more than 20 training sessions without explanation. He then became a journeyman and moved clubs every year, passing through Portuguesa, a second spell at Barueri, Boa Esporte, Brasiliense and Mogi Mirim.

== Honours ==
Santos

- Brasileirão: 2002, 2004

Benfica

- Primeira Liga: 2004–05
- Taça de Portugal: Runner-up 2004–05

Fluminense

- Brasileirão: 2010
