= 2004 Campeonato Paulista =

Campeonato Paulista - Série A1
- Season: 2004
- Champions: São Caetano (1st title)
- Relegated: Juventus; Oeste
- Matches: 110
- Goals: 360 (3.27 per match)
- Top goalscorer: Vágner Love (12 goals)

The 2004 Campeonato Paulista de Futebol Profissional da Primeira Divisão - Série A1 was the 103rd season of São Paulo's top professional football league. The competition began on 18 January and ended on 21 April. São Caetano became the champions, winning the title for the first time in their history. Vágner Love was the top scorer with 12 goals.

== Teams ==
Club	Home city	2003 result
América	São José do Rio Preto	10th
Atlético Sorocaba	Sorocaba	2nd (Série A2)
Corinthians	São Paulo (Tatuapé)	1st
Guarani	Campinas	6th
Ituano	Itu	16th
Juventus	São Paulo (Mooca)	19th
Marília	Marília	17th
Mogi Mirim	Mogi Mirim	15th
Oeste	Itápolis	1st (Série A2)
Palmeiras	São Paulo (Perdizes)	4th
Paulista	Jundiaí	11th
Ponte Preta	Campinas	12th
Portuguesa	São Paulo (Pari)	13th
Portuguesa Santista	Santos	3rd
Rio Branco	Americana	14th
Santo André	Santo André	8th
Santos	Santos	9th
São Caetano	São Caetano do Sul	5th
São Paulo	São Paulo (Morumbi)	2nd
União Barbarense	Santa Bárbara d'Oeste	7th
União São João	Araras	18th

== Group stage ==
=== Group A ===
Pos	Team	Pld	W	D	L	GF	GA	GD	Pts
1	São Paulo	9	8	1	0	21	5	+16	25
2	Portuguesa Santista	9	4	3	2	13	14	−1	15
3	Ponte Preta	9	3	4	2	12	9	+3	13
4	União Barbarense	9	3	4	2	8	9	−1	13
5	Rio Branco	9	4	0	5	10	10	0	12
6	América	9	3	3	3	10	12	−2	12
7	Portuguesa	9	2	4	3	14	16	−2	10
8	Atlético Sorocaba	9	2	3	4	12	16	−4	9
9	Corinthians	9	2	2	5	9	12	−3	8
10	Juventus	9	2	0	7	13	23	−10	6

=== Group B ===
Pos	Team	Pld	W	D	L	GF	GA	GD	Pts
1	Santos	10	7	2	1	27	13	+14	23
2	Paulista	10	7	1	2	24	17	+7	22
3	Palmeiras	10	6	2	2	25	13	+12	20
4	São Caetano	10	5	4	1	17	10	+7	19
5	Santo André	10	5	2	3	20	19	+1	17
6	Marília	10	5	2	3	17	16	+1	17
7	Ituano	10	3	1	6	13	15	−2	10
8	Guarani	10	1	5	4	12	19	−7	8
9	Mogi Mirim	10	1	2	7	11	20	−9	5
10	União São João	10	0	1	9	14	35	−21	1
11	Oeste	10	2	4	4	19	22	−3	−2 (Note: Oeste was punished with the loss of 12 points due to irregular squad of players.)

== Knockout phase ==
=== Quarter-finals ===
Team 1	Score	Team 2
Santos	1–0	União Barbarense
Paulista	4–3 (a.e.t)	Ponte Preta
São Paulo	0–2	São Caetano
Portuguesa Santista	1–2	Palmeiras

=== Semi-finals ===
Team 1	Agg.	Team 2	1st leg	2nd leg
Palmeiras	4–4 (3–4 p)	Paulista	1–1	3–3
Santos	3–7	São Caetano	3–3	0–4

=== Finals ===
Team 1	Agg.	Team 2	1st leg	2nd leg
Paulista	1–5	São Caetano	1–3	0–2

== Top goalscorers ==
Rank	Player	Team	Goals
1	(Brazil) Vágner Love	Palmeiras	14
2	(Brazil) Luís Fabiano	São Paulo	8
3	(Brazil) Lucas	Portuguesa	7
3	(Brazil) Robinho	Santos	7
3	(Brazil) Marcinho	São Caetano	7
3	(Brazil) Luciano Henrique	Atlético Sorocaba	7
4	(Brazil) Sorato	Marília	6
4	(Brazil) João Paulo	Paulista	6
4	(Brazil) Basílio	Santos	6

== See also ==
- Copa Paulista de Futebol
- Campeonato Paulista Série A2
- Campeonato Paulista Série A3
- Campeonato Paulista Segunda Divisão
