= Netinho =

Netinho is a nickname. It may refer to:

- Netinho (singer) (1966–2026), Ernesto de Souza Andrade Júnior, Brazilian singer and performer
- Netinho (footballer, born 1968), Erwin Walter Aal Neto, Brazilian football right back
- Netinho (footballer, born 1984), Artur Pereira Neto, Brazilian football attacking midfielder
- Netinho (footballer, born 1993), João Inácio de Jesus Cerqueira, Brazilian football midfielder
- Netinho (footballer, born 1997), José Domingos de Moraes Neto, Brazilian football defensive midfielder
- Netinho de Paula (born 1970), José de Paula Neto, Brazilian presenter, singer, composer, actor and politician
- Netinho Reis (born 1993), Jonathas Rego Monteiro Porto Neto, Brazilian politician
