= Claiton =

Claiton may refer to:

- Claiton (footballer, born 1984), Brazilian-Italian footballer Claiton Machado dos Santos
- Claiton (footballer, born 1978), Brazilian football manager and former midfielder Claiton Alberto Fontoura dos Santos
