= Claiton dos Santos =

Claiton dos Santos may refer to:

- Claiton Alberto Fontoura dos Santos, Brazilian footballer
- Claiton Machado dos Santos, Brazilian footballer
