= Róbson (footballer, born 1970) =

Brazilian footballer and politician

Personal information
- Full name: José Róbson do Nascimento
- Date of birth: May 10, 1969 (age 57)
- Place of birth: Barra de São Miguel, Brazil
- Height: 1.85 m (6 ft 1 in)
- Position: Striker

Senior career*
Years	Team	Apps	(Gls)
1987–1996	Náutico		
1997	Maranhão		
1997	Internacional		
1998	América-MG		
1999	ABC		
2000	Botafogo		
2000	Santa Cruz	24	(10)
2001–2002	Bahia	40	(17)
2003	Paysandu	24	(21)
2003	Oita Trinita	7	(0)
2004	Santos	4	(2)
2004	Sport Recife		
2004	Juventude	6	(0)
2005–2007	Paysandu	37	(21)
- * Club domestic league appearances and goals

José Róbson do Nascimento, better known as Róbson or Robgol (born May 10, 1970, in Barra de São Miguel, Paraíba state is a Brazilian politician and former association football forward.

== Career ==
Róbson's football career started in 1987, playing for Náutico, of Pernambuco state. His nickname, Robgol, is a truncation of his name Róbson and the word gol (Portuguese for goal). In 2005 Róbson became the second goalscorer in Campeonato Brasileiro Série A with 21 goals.

== Achievements and titles ==
During his career, José Róbson do Nascimento has won several titles:

- 1995: Campeonato Maranhense top goalscorer, with 19 goals (Maranhão)
- 1996: Campeonato Pernambucano top goalscorer, with 19 goals (Náutico)
- 1999: Campeonato Potiguar (ABC)
- 2001: Campeonato Baiano (Bahia)
- 2001: Campeonato do Nordeste (Bahia)
- 2002: Campeonato do Nordeste (Bahia)
- 2003: Campeonato Paraense top goalscorer, with 9 goals (Paysandu)
- 2005: Campeonato Paraense (Paysandu)

== Politics ==
On June 21, 2006, Robgol retired from football, and joined the Partido Trabalhista Brasileiro (Brazilian Labour Party). During the 2006 general elections, he was elected Pará state deputy, with 33,400 votes, being the 35th most voted deputy candidate of his state.

== Club statistics ==
Club performance			League		Cup		League Cup		Total	
Season	Club	League	Apps	Goals	Apps	Goals	Apps	Goals	Apps	Goals
Japan			League		Emperor's Cup		J.League Cup		Total	
2003	Oita Trinita	J1 League	7	0	0	0	0	0	7	0
Total			7	0	0	0	0	0	7	0
