= Mauro (footballer, born 1977) =

Brazilian footballer

Personal information
- Full name: Mauro José Mestriner
- Date of birth: 30 October 1977 (age 49)
- Place of birth: Mogi Mirim, Brazil
- Height: 1.89 m (6 ft 2 in)
- Position: Goalkeeper

Team information
- Current team: Santos U20 (goalkeeping coach)

Youth career
- 1991–1996: Mogi Mirim

Senior career*
Years	Team	Apps	(Gls)
1997–2002	Mogi Mirim		
2001–2002	→ Santa Cruz (loan)		
2003	Marília		
2004–2005	Santos	53	(0)
2006	Noroeste	4	(0)
2006–2007	São Caetano	42	(0)
2008	Marília	12	(0)
2008	Ituano	0	(0)
2008	Paraná	15	(0)
2009	Mirassol	14	(0)
2009	Mixto	7	(0)
2010	Oeste	4	(0)
2010	São José-SP	0	(0)
2010	Mixto	1	(0)
2011	Volta Redonda	23	(0)
2011–2014	Resende	47	(0)
2014–2016	Mogi Mirim	29	(0)
- * Club domestic league appearances and goals

Mauro José Mestriner (born 30 September 1977), simply known as Mauro, is a Brazilian football coach and former player who played as a goalkeeper. He is the current goalkeeping coach of Santos' under-20 team.

== Playing career ==
Born in Mogi Mirim, São Paulo, Mauro made his senior debut with Mogi Mirim. In May 2001, after the club's relegation in the Campeonato Paulista, he was loaned to Santa Cruz.

In 2003, Mauro was a regular starter for Marília as the club reached the final stage of the year's Série B. On 17 December 2003, he signed a one-year deal with Série A side Santos.

Initially a backup option to Júlio Sérgio, Mauro featured regularly during the 2004 season as the club won the Série A title. He lost his starting spot to youth graduate Saulo during the 2005 campaign, and moved to Noroeste on 26 December of that year.

Mauro moved to São Caetano in April 2006, being a regular starter in his first year but being a backup to Luiz in his second. He left to return to Marília in December 2007, and represented Ituano and Paraná during a part of the 2008 season.

Mauro subsequently played for Mirassol, Mixto (two stints), Oeste, São José-SP, Volta Redonda and Resende before returning to his first club Mogi Mirim in April 2014. He was released by the latter on 24 December 2015, and retired shortly after.

== Post-playing career ==
In 2016, Mauro returned to Santos to work as a goalkeeping coach of the youth categories.

== Honours ==
=== Player ===
Santos

- Campeonato Brasileiro Série A: 2004

Mixto

- Campeonato Mato-Grossense Segunda Divisão: 2009
