= Preto Casagrande =

Brazilian footballer

Personal information
- Full name: Carlos Eduardo Casagrande
- Date of birth: 7 May 1975 (age 51)
- Place of birth: Cascavel, Brazil
- Height: 1.74 m (5 ft 9 in)
- Position: Defensive midfielder

Youth career
- 1990–1994: Vasco da Gama

Senior career*
Years	Team	Apps	(Gls)
1994–1997	Vasco da Gama	17	(2)
1996	→ Olaria (loan)		
1997–1999	Vitória	48	(4)
2000	Vitória de Guimarães	12	(1)
2001–2002	Bahia	40	(12)
2002	Atlético Paranaense	8	(0)
2003	Bahia	36	(8)
2004	Santos	26	(2)
2005	Fluminense	6	(1)
2006	Fortaleza		
2006	Vitória		
2007	Bahia		
2009	Volta Redonda		

Managerial career
- 2016–2017: Bahia (assistant-interim)
- 2017: Bahia
- 2017–: Bahia (assistant-interim)
- * Club domestic league appearances and goals

Carlos Eduardo "Preto" Casagrande (born 7 May 1975) is a Brazilian former professional footballer who played at both club and international levels as a defensive midfielder.

== Honours ==
=== Player ===
Vitória

- Campeonato Baiano: 1997, 1999
- Copa do Nordeste: 1997, 1999

Bahia

- Campeonato Baiano: 2001
- Copa do Nordeste: 2001, 2002

Santos

- Campeonato Brasileiro Série A: 2004

Fluminense

- Campeonato Carioca: 2005
