= Barra de São Miguel, Paraíba =

Coordinates: 7°45′03″S 36°19′04″W

- Municipality
- Interactive map of Barra de São Miguel, Paraíba
- Country: Brazil
- Region: South
- State: Paraíba
- Mesoregion: Boborema

Population (2020)
  - Total: 6,065
- Time zone: UTC−3 (BRT)

Barra de São Miguel (Central northeastern portuguese pronunciation: [ˈbahɐ di ˈsɐ̃w miˈɡɛw]) is a municipality in the state of Paraíba in the Northeast Region of Brazil.

== See also ==
- List of municipalities in Paraíba
