= Reinaldo (footballer, born June 1980) =

Brazilian footballer

Personal information
- Full name: Reinaldo de Souza
- Date of birth: June 8, 1980 (age 46)
- Place of birth: Rio de Janeiro, Brazil
- Height: 1.80 m (5 ft 11 in)
- Position: Striker

Youth career
- 1998–1999: Palmeiras

Senior career*
Years	Team	Apps	(Gls)
2000–2001	Palmeiras		
2002–2003	Avaí		
2004	Jaguares	2	(0)
2004–2005	Criciúma	17	(8)
2005	Ulsan Hyundai	1	(0)
2005–2006	Botafogo	57	(18)
2007–2009	Vestel Manisaspor	15	(1)
2007–2008	→ Botafogo (loan)	16	(1)
2008–2009	→ Grêmio (loan)	20	(9)
2010	Guarani	15	(2)
2011	Oeste		
2011	Americana	12	(2)
- * Club domestic league appearances and goals

Reinaldo de Souza or simply Reinaldo (born June 8, 1980 in Rio de Janeiro), is a Brazilian striker.

== Honours ==
- Rio de Janeiro State League: 2006

== Contract ==
- Botafogo (Loan) 1 August 2007 to 31 July 2008
