= Jerri (footballer) =

Brazilian footballer

Personal information
- Full name: Jerri Ariel Farias Hahn
- Date of birth: 12 June 1982 (age 44)
- Place of birth: Osório, Rio Grande do Sul, Brazil
- Height: 1.67 m (5 ft 5 1/2 in)
- Position: Midfielder

Youth career
- Santos

Senior career*
Years	Team	Apps	(Gls)
2002–2005	Santos	26	(5)
2002	→ Jabaquara (loan)	?	(19)
2004	→ Goiás (loan)	3	(0)
2005–2006	Al Nassr		
2006–2008	Hatta	48	(20)
2009–2010	Al Khaleej	23	(7)
2010–2011	Ajman	36	(11)
2011–2012	Al-Shaab	21	(8)
2013–2014	Chiangrai United	34	(2)
- * Club domestic league appearances and goals

Jerri Ariel Farias Hahn (born 12 June 1982), simply known as Jerri, is a Brazilian footballer who plays as a midfielder.

== Honours ==
Jabaquara

- Campeonato Paulista Série B3: 2002
