= Izaias (footballer) =

Brazilian footballer

Personal information
- Full name: Izaias Maia Carneiro
- Date of birth: June 5, 1975 (age 51)
- Place of birth: Brazil
- Height: 1.67 m (5 ft 6 in)
- Position: Forward

Senior career*
Years	Team	Apps	(Gls)
1994–1996	Rio Branco-SP		
1997	Jaboticabal		
1998	Rio Branco-SP		
1998–1999	Santo André		
1999	XV de Piracicaba		
2000	Rio Branco-SP	15	(2)
2000–2001	Paulista		
2002	Santo André		
2002	Rio Branco-SP	8	(0)
2003	Rio Preto	10	(5)
2003–2004	Paulista	33	(15)
2004	Figueirense	24	(5)
2005	Inter de Limeira	15	(8)
2005	Ponte Preta	30	(9)
2006	Yokohama FC	2	(0)
2006	Remo	11	(9)
2007	Sertãozinho	2	(0)
2007	Fortaleza	4	(0)
2007	União São João	11	(4)
2008	CSA		
2009	Rio Preto	12	(1)
2010	União Barbarense	12	(3)
2011–2012	Tuna Luso		
2012	Juazeirense	5	(0)
- * Club domestic league appearances and goals

Izaias Maia Carneiro (born June 5, 1975), known as Izaias, is a Brazilian former professional footballer who played as a forward.
