= Marcelinho (footballer, born February 1978) =

Brazilian footballer

Marcelo de Souza Ramos (born 25 February 1978), commonly known as Marcelinho, is a Brazilian former football offensive midfielder who played in Brazil, Ecuador and Mexico.

== Career ==
Born in Jundiaí do Sul, Marcelinho played for Santo André, Clube Atlético Paranaense and Figueirense, all of his native Brazil. He joined Necaxa in the Primera División de México for the 2004 Apertura. With Necaxa, Mercelinho saw little time, starting in one game and appearing as a substitute in five more, while scoring no goals. In July 2005, he joined Ecuadorian Serie A side Olmedo.
