= Fabrício Carvalho (footballer, born February 1978) =

Brazilian footballer

Personal information
- Full name: Fabrício de Carvalho Silva
- Date of birth: 18 February 1978 (age 48)
- Place of birth: Andradina, Brazil
- Height: 1.92 m (6 ft 4 in)
- Position: Forward

Senior career*
Years	Team	Apps	(Gls)
1998–1999	Villa Española (URU)	26	(14)
2000	Andradina-SP		
2000	Guararapes-SP		
2000	União Barbarense		
2000–2001	Nacional	29	(11)
2001–2002	União Barbarense		
2002–2003	Ponte Preta	49	(16)
2004–2005	São Caetano	42	(18)
2007–2010	Goiás	19	(4)
2008	→ Portuguesa (loan)		
2010	Remo		
2010–2011	Bragantino	1	(1)
2011	Oeste	7	(0)
2012	Ferroviária		
2012	→ Guaratinguetá (loan)		
2013	Araxá		
2014–2015	Cabofriense		
2015	Taboão da Serra		
- * Club domestic league appearances and goals

Fabrício de Carvalho Silva (born 18 February 1978), or simply Fabrício Carvalho, is a Brazilian former professional footballer who played as a forward.
