= Leandro (footballer, born 1980) =

Brazilian footballer

Personal information
- Full name: Leandro Lessa Azevedo
- Date of birth: 13 August 1980 (age 46)
- Place of birth: Ribeirão Preto, Brazil
- Height: 1.73 m (5 ft 8 in)
- Positions: Winger; forward

Youth career
- 1997–1998: Botafogo-SP

Senior career*
Years	Team	Apps	(Gls)
1999–2000	Botafogo-SP	2	(0)
2001–2003	Corinthians	114	(17)
2003–2004	Lokomotiv Moscow	6	(0)
2004	→ Goiás (loan)	41	(14)
2005	→ Fluminense (loan)	30	(5)
2006–2007	São Paulo	65	(10)
2008–2009	Tokyo Verdy	54	(29)
2010–2012	Grêmio	22	(0)
2011	→ Vasco da Gama (loan)	31	(1)
2012	→ Comercial (loan)	7	(0)
2013	Fortaleza	12	(1)
2013–2014	Botafogo-SP	14	(1)
2015–2016	Catanduvense	13	(1)
- * Club domestic league appearances and goals

Leandro Lessa Azevedo (born 13 August 1980), simply known as Leandro, is a Brazilian former footballer who played as a striker.

== Career statistics ==
Appearances and goals by club, season and competition
Club	Season	League			Emperor's Cup		J.League Cup		Total	
Club	Season	Division	Apps	Goals	Apps	Goals	Apps	Goals	Apps	Goals
Tokyo Verdy	2008	J1 League	22	2	0	0	5	0	27	2
Tokyo Verdy	2009	J2 League	32	7	0	0	—		32	7
Career total			54	9	0	0	5	0	59	9

== Honours ==
Corinthians

- Brazil Cup: 2002
- Tournament Rio - São Paulo: 2002

Fluminense

- Rio de Janeiro State League: 2005

São Paulo

- Brazilian League: 2006, 2007

Grêmio

- Rio Grande do Sul State League: 2010

Vasco da Gama

- Brazil Cup: 2011
