= Alex (footballer, born June 1982) =

Brazilian association football player

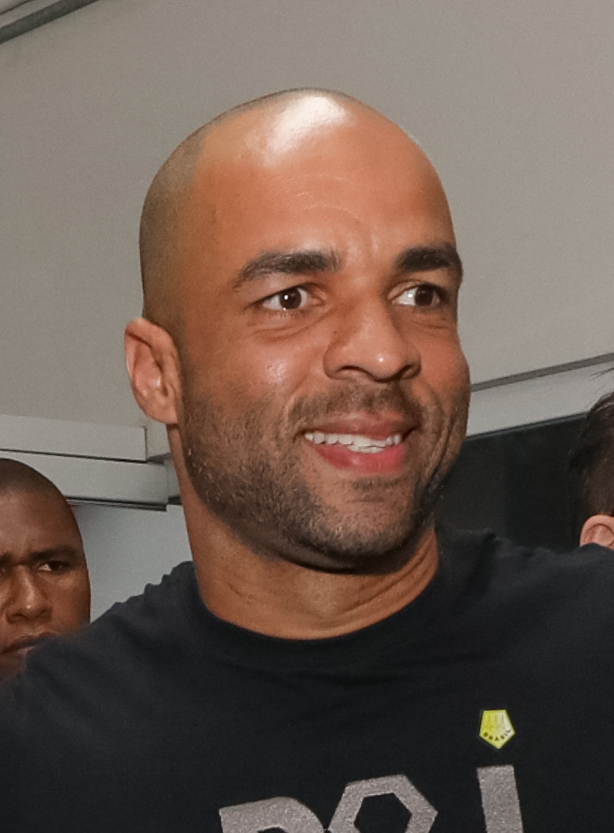
- Alex in 2020

Personal information
- Full name: Alex Rodrigo Dias da Costa
- Date of birth: 17 June 1982 (age 44)
- Place of birth: Niterói, Brazil
- Height: 1.88 m (6 ft 2 in)
- Position: Centre-back

Youth career
- 2000–2001: Juventus (SP)
- 2002: Santos

Senior career*
Years	Team	Apps	(Gls)
2002–2004	Santos	78	(14)
2004–2012	Chelsea	86	(7)
2004–2007	→ PSV (loan)	84	(11)
2012–2014	Paris Saint-Germain	70	(6)
2014–2016	AC Milan	46	(4)
Total		364	(42)

International career
2004	Brazil U23	8	(2)
2003–2008	Brazil	18	(0)
- * Club domestic league appearances and goals

Alex Rodrigo Dias da Costa (Brazilian Portuguese: [aˈlɛks ʁoˈdɾiɡu ˈdʒiaz dɐ ˈkɔstɐ]; born 17 June 1982), known as Alex, is a Brazilian former professional footballer who played as a centre-back. He was known for his physical strength and the power of his shot, which has gained him the nicknames of "The Tank" and "Canhão da Vila" ("Cannon of Vila Belmiro").

Having been bought by the Premier League club Chelsea in 2004, Alex was loaned to Dutch team PSV and he won 3 Eredivisie titles with them. Alex finally joined the Chelsea squad in the summer of 2007 after three years in the Netherlands. In his time at Chelsea, he won the FA Cup in 2009 and a league and FA Cup "double" in 2010, as well as reaching the 2008 UEFA Champions League Final. He joined Paris Saint-Germain for £4.2 million in January 2012 and won Ligue 1 twice with the club, moving to AC Milan on the expiration of his contract in 2014 and retiring two years later.

Alex earned 18 caps for Brazil between 2003 and 2008, winning the 2007 Copa América and finishing as runner-up at the 2003 CONCACAF Gold Cup.

== Club career ==
=== Santos ===
Alex began his career with Santos of Brazil, making his first team debut in 2002 before later becoming part of the club's central pillars. Alex made his professional league debut in the 1–1 draw against Fluminense. Less than a month after his debut, Alex scored his first goal for the club in a match against Vasco da Gama on 18 September 2002. After multiple impressive performances, Alex secured his place in the team's regular starting lineup. In his first season playing, in 2002, Santos won the Série A title, their first since 1968.

In the 2003 season, Alex participated in 34 matches and, despite playing defense, managed to score nine goals. Also in 2003, Alex helped Santos reach the final of the Copa Libertadores, where Santos lost 5–1 on aggregate against Argentine side Boca Juniors. In the second leg of Copa Libertadores Finals, Alex scored the only goal for Santos in a 3–1 loss.

=== Chelsea ===
Alex was signed by English Premier League club Chelsea in 2004 on the recommendation of famed PSV and Chelsea scout Piet de Visser, but because of potential problems in attaining a work permit, he was loaned out to Dutch Eredivisie club PSV.

==== PSV (loan) ====
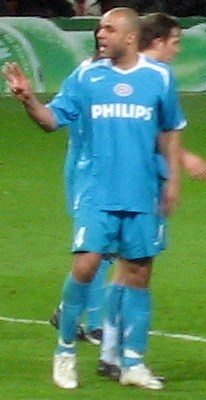
Alex playing for PSV in 2007

The joint contract of Chelsea and PSV loaned Alex to the latter, with Chelsea having a €1 million buy-out clause. Alex eventually played three years at PSV, donning the number 4 jersey for the Eindhoven club. While playing for PSV, he earned himself the nickname "The Tank" due to his cannonball-like free kicks and his strong physical stature.

He formally joined PSV in the 2004–05 season, helping the club win a domestic double of both the Eredivisie championship and Dutch Cup that year. In the Champions League, Alex played a key role in the PSV team that was eliminated in the semi-finals against A.C. Milan on away goals (PSV won their home game 3–1 but had previously lost 0–2 at the San Siro). The team eliminated AS Monaco and Olympique Lyonnais on their way to the semi-finals.

Alex won a second straight Dutch league championship in the 2005–06 season with PSV. Chelsea did not recall Alex, even though Piet de Visser and Chelsea Head of Scouting Frank Arnesen recommended that Alex be brought over to solve the club's defensive problems. Instead, Chelsea manager José Mourinho insisted on the signing of Khalid Boulahrouz in place of Alex. Therefore, Alex stayed a third season at PSV on loan in 2006–07. He won a third straight Eredivisie title with PSV, after a dramatic final-day finish to the season in which PSV sensationally trumped both AFC Ajax and AZ. Alex scored in a UEFA Champions League first knockout round against Arsenal for both teams in the second half, turning in an own goal past his own goalkeeper Heurelho Gomes, but compensating for it with a storming headed goal with eight minutes left to play to redeem himself and in the process ensure PSV a place in the quarter-finals. He was later injured, however, and played no part in PSV's UEFA Champions League quarter-final against Liverpool, which PSV lost 4–0 on aggregate.

==== 2007–08 ====
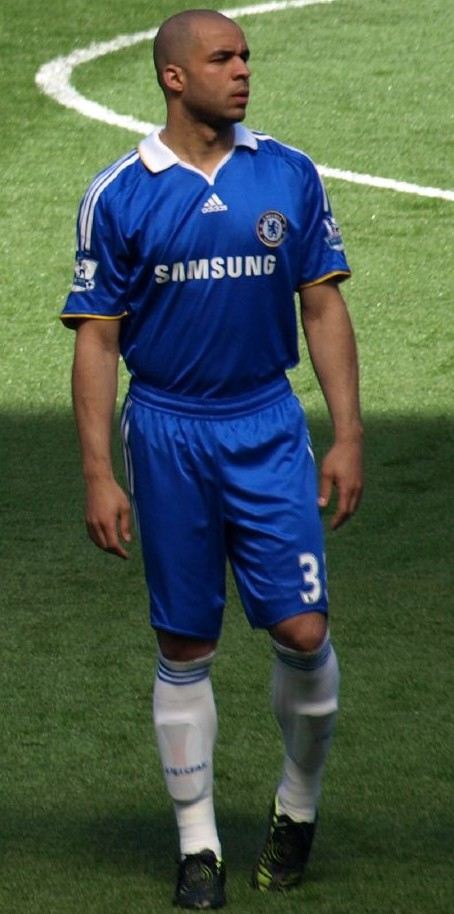
Alex playing for Chelsea in 2008

In an interview with Dutch newspaper De Telegraaf, Alex confirmed that Chelsea were in the process of getting him a work permit and that the possibilities of him joining Chelsea next season were very high. Alex later confirmed that Chelsea had almost completed the process of acquiring him a work permit and that he would start the season as a Chelsea player.

Alex was granted a work permit on 2 August 2007, and completed his transfer to Chelsea after agreeing to personal terms and passing a medical, where he then signed a three-year deal with the London club on 10 August.

On 14 August 2007, Alex was presented to the English media in a press conference with manager José Mourinho, where he was given shirt number 33. He made his debut on 19 August when he came on as a substitute for Florent Malouda against Liverpool in the 85th minute, with the teams tied at 1–1. He also played in the 0–2 defeat away at Aston Villa and the 4–0 victory over Hull City in the League Cup.

Alex scored his first goal for Chelsea on 20 October 2007, a 30-yard free kick against Middlesbrough. He scored from another free kick on 28 November in a Champions League game against Rosenborg BK. He then scored in Chelsea's 4–4 draw with Aston Villa, scoring his first goal at Stamford Bridge from an Andriy Shevchenko pass, taking his tally for the season to three goals.

==== 2008–09 ====
Alex enjoyed his longest spell in the first team during the 2008–09 season. He was given his chance due to regular starter Ricardo Carvalho being injured for long periods of the campaign. He scored Chelsea's 1,000th Premier League goal against Sunderland on 1 November 2008. Alex started every game for Chelsea under Guus Hiddink, who managed Alex at PSV, and also scored in an FA Cup quarter-final victory away to Coventry City.

In the Champions League quarter-finals second leg at Stamford Bridge against Liverpool, Alex scored a free-kick from 30 yards out to level the score at 2–2. The game eventually ended 4–4 and Chelsea won 7–5 on aggregate, but Chelsea were infamously eliminated by Barcelona in the semi-finals. On 10 May, Alex scored a header in Chelsea's 4–1 Premier League win over Arsenal from a Didier Drogba free-kick.

==== 2009–10 ====
Alex played his first pre-season match against Milan in the World Football Challenge.

On 13 October 2009, Alex signed a new four-year contract with Chelsea, keeping him at Stamford Bridge until the summer of 2013.

Alex missed the start of the season, having sustained a groin injury on 15 August 2009. He started his first game of the season in a League Cup match against Bolton Wanderers on 28 October 2009, playing the full 90 minutes. He made his first Premier League start of the season against Portsmouth on 16 December 2009.

On 13 March 2010, he scored his first goal of the season at Stamford Bridge giving Chelsea the lead in a 4–1 league win over West Ham United.

==== 2010–11 ====
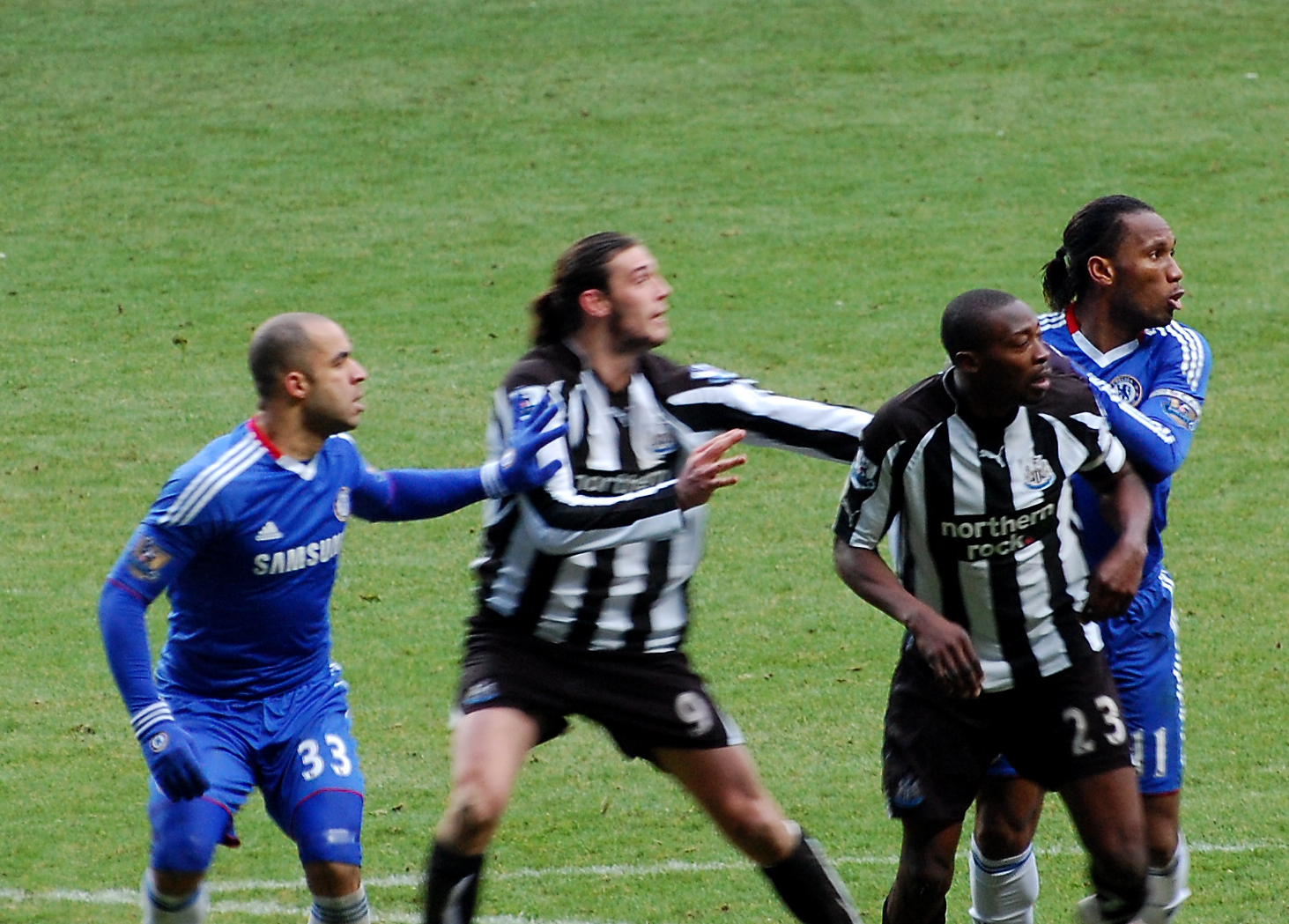
Alex (left) playing for Chelsea in 2010

In light of Ricardo Carvalho's departure to Real Madrid, Alex started the 2010–11 season as first-choice centre-back for Chelsea, alongside John Terry. On 3 October 2010, he scored a 25-yard freekick in a 2–0 victory over Arsenal at Stamford Bridge. On 5 October, he was ruled out for up to three weeks after picking up a thigh injury in the final stages of Sunday's 2–0 win over Arsenal, and subsequently withdrew from the Brazil squad for the friendly matches against Iran, and Ukraine. Alex made his return for Chelsea where he made his return on 30 October 2010 and played 90 minutes against Blackburn Rovers in a 2–1 win. On 1 December 2010, Alex suffered a knee injury and was out of action about three months. While rehabilitation on his injury, Manager Carlo Ancelotti would consider signing a new defender if Alex fails to recover from knee surgery before the end of January but Alex failed to do so and Chelsea went on to sign David Luiz from Benfica. By mid March 2011, Alex made his return to training with the first-team squad.

After he recovered from the injury, Alex made his return on 9 April 2011 in a match against Wigan Athletic in a 1–0 win, where he came on for Paulo Ferreira in the 75th minute. On 8 May 2011, it took a goal-costing mistake from David Luiz against Manchester United in the season-deciding match for Alex to break back into the starting line-up, getting substituted on at half time that match, and then starting and playing the full 90 minutes the following match against Newcastle United at Stamford Bridge on 15 May 2011, where he scored a headed goal in the 82nd minute in a 2–2 draw. In the last league game of the season against Everton, Alex started the match alongside John Terry but was substituted on 70 minutes for Ferreira in their 1–0 defeat at Goodison Park. At the end of the campaign, Alex made 20 appearances and scored 2 goals in all competitions.

==== 2011–12 ====
In the summer transfer window, Alex was the subject of a bid from local rivals Arsenal. On 20 August 2011, in a home game against West Bromwich Albion, a defensive mistake from Alex allowed striker Shane Long through to score four minutes into the game. In the end, however, Chelsea won 2–1. On 21 September 2011, in a League Cup tie against Fulham, Alex received a straight red card in the 49th minute after a foul on Kerim Frei, which also resulted a penalty. Pajtim Kasami, however, missed Fulham's penalty after his kick was saved by back-up goalkeeper Ross Turnbull. In the end, Chelsea later won 4–3 on penalties to progress to the next round. In November 2011, Alex made his last Chelsea appearance in a League Cup in a quarter-final against Liverpool, which Chelsea lost 2–0. He started the match but committed a handball in the penalty area, which Turnbull again saved from Andy Carroll.

On 3 December 2011, Alex submitted a transfer request, which was accepted. He had been the subject of a bid from Queens Park Rangers in the first transfer activity under their new manager Mark Hughes. The move, however, broke down after both parties reportedly failed to agree personal terms; QPR could not match his wage demands and Alex stated he did not want to stay in England.

=== Paris Saint-Germain ===
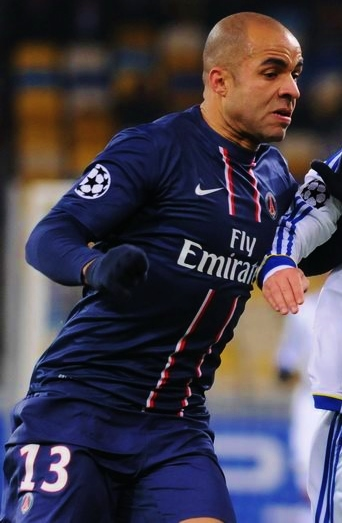
Alex playing for Paris Saint-Germain in 2012

On 27 January 2012, Alex joined Paris Saint-Germain for £4.2 million to reunite with his former manager Carlo Ancelotti. On his move, he publicly stated that the reason for it was that Chelsea manager André Villas-Boas had not given him enough playing time at the club. He was given the number 13 shirt, free since the departure of Sammy Traoré.

On 12 February 2012, Alex made his debut for PSG in a 0–0 draw against Nice, where he made his first start before coming off for Christophe Jallet at half-time. The following week, on 19 February 2012, Alex scored a 30-yard goal from a lay-off free kick, his first goal for PSG, against Montpellier on a free-kick combination with compatriot Nenê, which the result was 2–2. On 8 April 2012, Alex scored the winning goal in the 61st minute in a 2–1 win over Olympique de Marseille. On 6 November 2012, in a Champions League match against Dinamo Zagreb, Alex scored the first goal of the match, a half-volley that evaded the reach of Dinamo goalkeeper Ivan Kelava after 16 minutes.

On 3 August 2013, Alex scored the game-winning goal with the last kick of the game in PSG's 2–1 defeat of Bordeaux in the Trophée des Champions at the Stade d'Angondjé in Libreville, Gabon.

=== AC Milan ===
On 5 June 2014, Alex signed for Milan on free transfer when his contract with PSG expired. He made his competitive debut on 31 August in their first match of the new Serie A season, a 3–1 home win over Lazio in which he deflected Antonio Candreva's shot into his own net. Alex scored his first Milan goal in a 3–2 loss to Sassuolo on 17 May 2015. On 31 January 2016, Alex scored a diving header in the Derby della Madonnina.

On 25 May 2016, club owner Silvio Berlusconi announced his departure, along with those of Phillippe Mexes, Kevin-Prince Boateng and Mario Balotelli.

In December 2016, Alex announced his retirement as a player.

== International career ==
Alex made his debut for Brazil on 17 July 2003 against Mexico in 2003 CONCACAF Gold Cup. Although he played under Brazil U-23 team at the tournament, the tournament was a full international tournament, hence the international cap gained was fully recognized by FIFA.

He was overlooked for the 2006 FIFA World Cup squad. However, after the World Cup, he earned regular call-ups with the new head coach, Dunga. He was a member of the Brazil squad that won the 2007 Copa América with a 3–0 victory over arch-rivals Argentina in the final. He was dropped from the Brazilian squad for the 2009 FIFA Confederations Cup due to injuries.

On 11 May, he was called up to the 2010 FIFA World Cup squad as one of the seven back-up players.

== Career statistics ==
=== Club ===
Appearances and goals by club, season and competition
Club	Season	League			National cup		League cup		Continental		Other		Total	
Club	Season	Division	Apps	Goals	Apps	Goals	Apps	Goals	Apps	Goals	Apps	Goals	Apps	Goals
Santos	2002	Série A	25	3	—		—		—		—		25	3
Santos	2003	Série A	34	9	—		—		19 (Note: Thirteen appearances and four goals in Copa Libertadores, six appearances and one goal in Copa Sudamericana)	5	6 (Note: Appearance(s) in Campeonato Paulista)	1	59	15
Santos	2004	Série A	4	0	—		—		5 (Note: Appearance(s) in Copa Libertadores)	1	9	1	18	2
Santos	Total		63	12	—		—		24	6	15	2	102	20
PSV (loan)	2004–05	Eredivisie	27	3	4	0	—		13 (Note: Appearances in UEFA Champions League)	2	—		44	5
PSV (loan)	2005–06	Eredivisie	28	2	2	0	—		7	0	1 (Note: Appearance(s) in Johan Cruyff Shield)	0	38	2
PSV (loan)	2006–07	Eredivisie	29	6	3	0	—		8	2	1	0	41	8
PSV (loan)	Total		84	11	9	0	—		28	4	2	0	123	15
Chelsea	2007–08	Premier League	28	2	2	0	3	0	6	1	—		39	3
Chelsea	2008–09	Premier League	24	2	6	1	2	0	9	1	—		41	4
Chelsea	2009–10	Premier League	16	1	6	0	1	0	2	1	0	0	25	1
Chelsea	2010–11	Premier League	15	2	0	0	1	0	4	0	—		20	2
Chelsea	2011–12	Premier League	3	0	0	0	3	0	3	0	—		9	0
Chelsea	Total		86	7	14	1	10	0	24	3	0	0	134	10
Paris Saint-Germain	2011–12	Ligue 1	15	2	1	0	0	0	—		—		16	2
Paris Saint-Germain	2012–13	Ligue 1	24	2	1	0	0	0	9	2	—		34	4
Paris Saint-Germain	2013–14	Ligue 1	31	2	1	0	2	0	7	0	1 (Note: Appearance in Trophée des Champions)	1	42	3
Paris Saint-Germain	Total		70	6	3	0	2	0	16	2	1	1	92	9
AC Milan	2014–15	Serie A	21	1	2	0	—		—		—		23	1
AC Milan	2015–16	Serie A	25	3	0	0	—		—		—		25	3
AC Milan	Total		46	4	2	0	—		—		—		48	4
Career total			349	40	28	1	12	0	92	15	18	3	499	58

=== International ===
Appearances and goals by national team and year
National team	Year	Apps	Goals
Brazil	2003	5	0
Brazil	2006	2	0
Brazil	2007	8	0
Brazil	2008	3	0
Total		18	0

== Honours ==
Santos

- Campeonato Brasileiro Série A: 2002

PSV

- Eredivisie: 2004–05, 2005–06, 2006–07
- KNVB Cup: 2004–05

Chelsea

- Premier League: 2009–10
- FA Cup: 2008–09, 2009–10
- FA Community Shield: 2009
- Football League Cup runner-up: 2007–08
- UEFA Champions League: 2011–12; runner-up: 2007–08

Paris Saint-Germain

- Ligue 1: 2012–13, 2013–14
- Coupe de la Ligue: 2013–14
- Trophée des Champions: 2013

AC Milan

- Coppa Italia runner-up: 2015–16

Brazil

- Copa América: 2007

Individual

- Bola de Prata: 2002, 2003
