= William Pinheiro =

Brazilian footballer (1989–2018)

Personal information
- Full name: William Pinheiro Rodrigues
- Date of birth: 19 January 1989
- Place of birth: Brazil
- Date of death: 25 February 2018 (aged 29)
- Height: 1.80 m (5 ft 11 in)
- Position: Midfielder

Senior career*
Years	Team	Apps	(Gls)
2008	Kyoto Sanga FC		
2009	Sagawa Printing		
2009	Olaria		
- * Club domestic league appearances and goals

William Pinheiro Rodrigues (January 19, 1989 – 25 February 2018) was a Brazilian football player.
