= Basílio (footballer, born 1972) =

Brazilian footballer (born 1972)

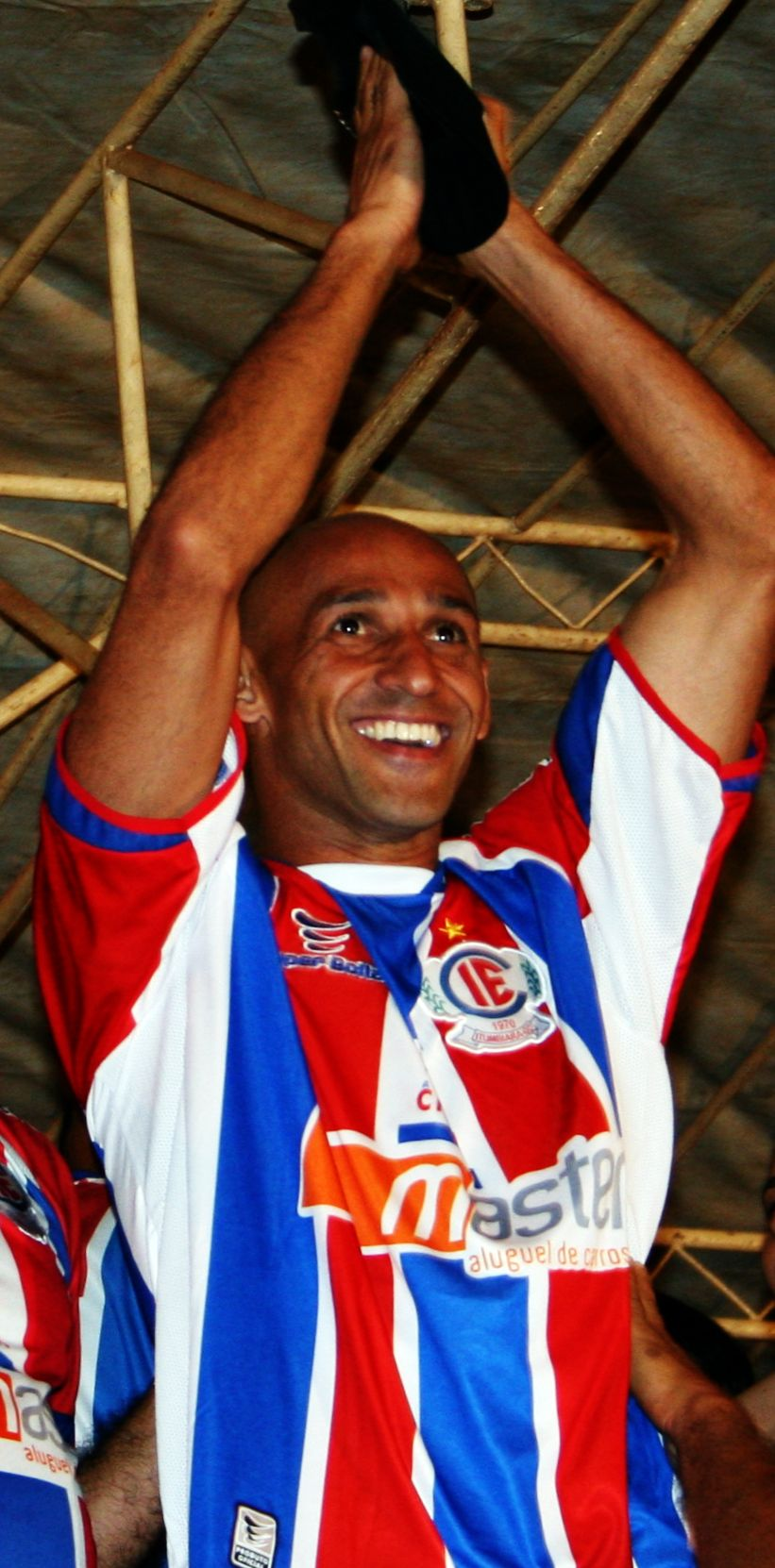

Personal information
- Full name: Valdeci Basílio da Silva
- Date of birth: 14 July 1972 (age 54)
- Place of birth: Andradina, Brazil
- Height: 1.72 m (5 ft 7 1/2 in)
- Position: Striker

Senior career*
| Years | Team | Apps | (Gls) |
| 1993 | XV de Jaú | | |
| 1993 | Andradina | | |
| 1994 | XV de Jaú | | |
| 1994 | Inter de Bebedouro | | |
| 1995 | Olímpia | | |
| 1996 | São José-SP | | |
| 1996–1997 | Coritiba | | |
| 1998 | Kashiwa Reysol | 27 | (6) |
| 1999 | Coritiba | 17 | (2) |
| 2000–2001 | Palmeiras | | |
| 2002 | Ituano | | |
| 2002 | Ponte Preta | | |
| 2003 | Grêmio | | |
| 2003 | Marília | | |
| 2004–2005 | Santos | 94 | (33) |
| 2006 | Tokyo Verdy | 18 | (7) |
| 2007 | Marília | | |
| 2008 | Itumbiara | | |
| 2008 | Ipatinga | | |
| 2008–2009 | Grêmio Barueri | 27 | (3) |
| 2010 | Itumbiara | | |
| 2010 | Marília | | |
| 2011 | Sertãozinho | | |
- * Club domestic league appearances and goals

Valdeci Basílio da Silva (born 14 July 1972) is a Brazilian former football player.

== Club statistics ==
| Club performance | | | League | | Cup | | League Cup | | Continental | | Total | |
| Season | Club | League | Apps | Goals | Apps | Goals | Apps | Goals | Apps | Goals | Apps | Goals |
| Japan | | | League | | Emperor's Cup | | J.League Cup | | Asia | | Total | |
|---|---|---|---|---|---|---|---|---|---|---|---|---|
| 1998 | Kashiwa Reysol | J1 League | 27 | 6 | 0 | 0 | 4 | 3 | - | | 31 | 9 |
| 2006 | Tokyo Verdy | J2 League | 18 | 7 | 0 | 0 | - | | 1 | 0 | 19 | 7 |
| Career total | | | 45 | 13 | 0 | 0 | 4 | 3 | 1 | 0 | 50 | 16 |
