= Lopes Tigrão =

Brazilian footballer (born 1979)

Personal information
- Full name: Wellington Nogueira Lopes de Avellar
- Date of birth: June 1, 1979 (age 47)
- Place of birth: Volta Redonda - RJ, Brazil
- Height: 1.86 m (6 ft 1 in)
- Positions: Striker; attacking midfielder

Senior career*
Years	Team	Apps	(Gls)
1999	Volta Redonda		
2000–2002	Palmeiras		
2003	Flamengo		
2004	Fluminense		
2004	Santos		
2004–2005	Juventude		
2005	Cruzeiro		
2006–2007	Vegalta Sendai		
2008	Yokohama F. Marinos		
2009	Atlético Mineiro		
2009	Juventude		
2010	Monte Azul		
2010	Ceará		
2011	Volta Redonda		
2012	Metropolitano		
2013	São José		
2015	Brasiliense		
2016	Volta Redonda		
- * Club domestic league appearances and goals

Wellington Nogueira Lopes de Avellar, or simply Lopes Tigrão (born June 1, 1979), is a Brazilian former footballer who played as a forward or midfielder. He won the top scorer of Copa Libertadores in 2001, scoring 9 goals.

Lopes has played for Palmeiras, Santos, Juventude and Cruzeiro, Atlético and Ceará in the Campeonato Brasileiro. He has also played for Vegalta Sendai and Yokohama F. Marinos of J1 League.

== Club statistics ==
Club performance			League		Cup		League Cup		Total	
Season	Club	League	Apps	Goals	Apps	Goals	Apps	Goals	Apps	Goals
Brazil			League		Copa do Brasil		League Cup		Total	
2000	Palmeiras	Série A	14	2					14	2
2001	Palmeiras	Série A	22	8					22	8
2002	Palmeiras	Série A	8	0					8	0
2003	Flamengo	Série A	29	3					29	3
2004	Santos	Série A	6	0					6	0
2004	Juventude	Série A	24	9					24	9
2005	Juventude	Série A								
2005	Cruzeiro	Série A	11	1					11	1
Japan			League		Emperor's Cup		J.League Cup		Total	
2006	Vegalta Sendai	J2 League	45	14	2	0	-		47	14
2007	Vegalta Sendai	J2 League	42	14	0	0	-		42	14
2008	Yokohama F. Marinos	J1 League	16	1	0	0	0	0	16	1
Country	Brazil		114	23					114	23
Country	Japan		103	29	2	0	0	0	105	29
Total			217	52	2	0	0	0	219	52

== Honors ==
=== Club ===
Volta Redonda

- Copa Rio: 1999

Palmeiras

- Copa dos Campeões: 2000

=== Individual ===
- Copa Libertadores Top Scorer: 2001
