= Netinho (footballer, born 1984) =

Brazilian footballer

Personal information
- Full name: Artur Pereira Neto
- Date of birth: April 24, 1984 (age 42)
- Place of birth: Itajaí, Brazil
- Height: 1.72 m (5 ft 8 in)
- Position: Midfielder

Youth career
- 2002–2003: Guarani

Senior career*
Years	Team	Apps	(Gls)
2004	Guarani	11	(2)
2005–2010	Atlético Paranaense	65	(5)
2006	→ Náutico (loan)		
2011	Al-Ahly Doha		
2011	América-MG	9	(0)
2011–2012	Goiás	13	(1)
2012–2013	América-RN		
2014	Vila Nova		
2015–2016	Londrina		
- * Club domestic league appearances and goals

Artur Pereira Neto (born April 24, 1984), or simply Netinho, is a Brazilian former professional footballer who played as a midfielder.

== Honours ==
- Paraná State League: 2005, 2009
