= Marcinho (footballer, born 20 March 1981) =

Brazilian footballer

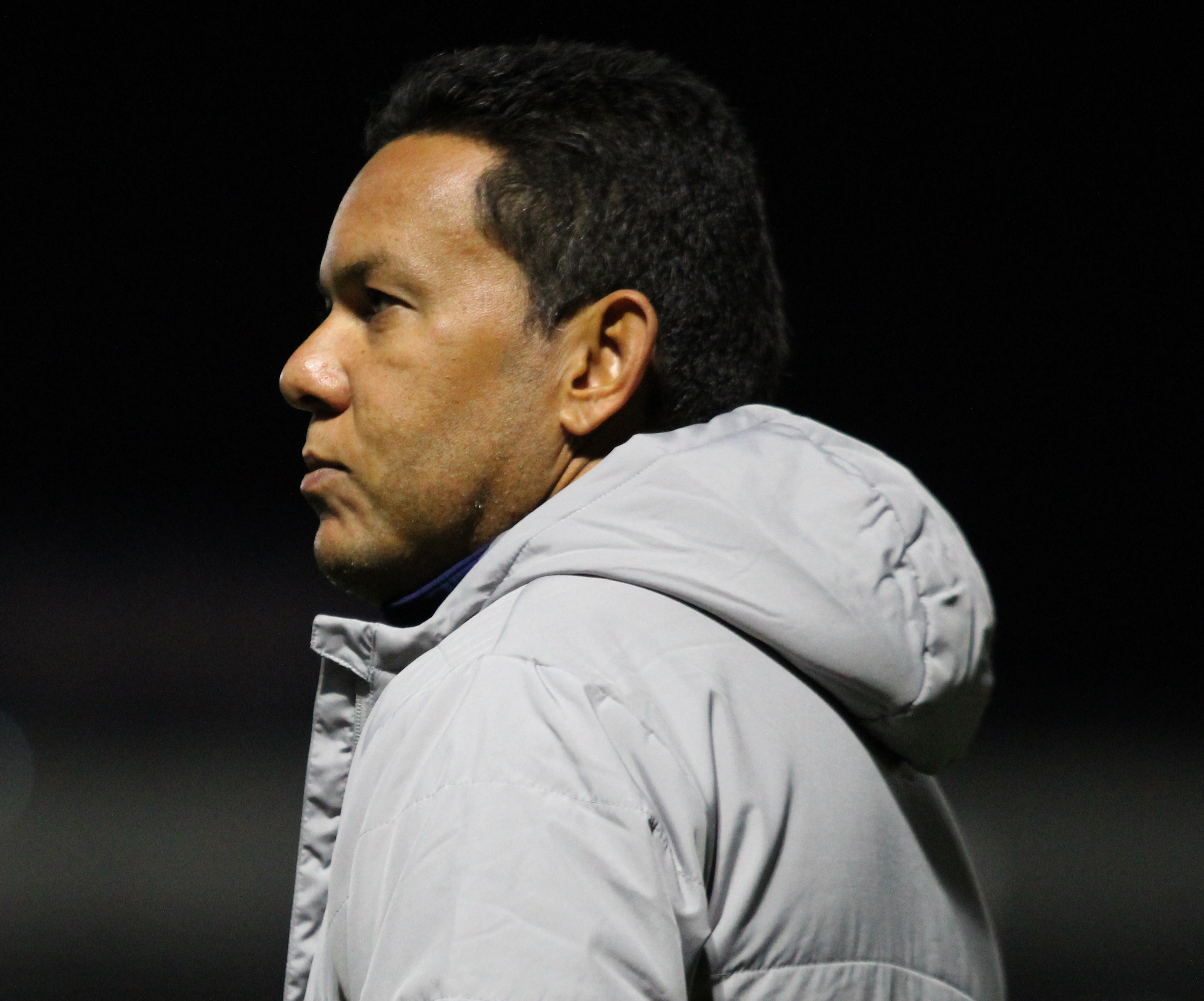
- Marcinho in 2022

Personal information
- Full name: Márcio Miranda Freitas Rocha da Silva
- Date of birth: 20 March 1981 (age 45)
- Place of birth: Campinas, Brazil
- Height: 1.72 m (5 ft 7 1/2 in)
- Positions: Attacking midfielder; forward

Youth career
- 1996–1999: Etti Jundiaí

Senior career*
| Years | Team | Apps | (Gls) |
| 2000–2002 | Etti Jundiaí | | |
| 2002 | → Corinthians (loan) | 24 | (2) |
| 2003–2005 | São Caetano | 77 | (22) |
| 2005–2006 | Palmeiras | 80 | (25) |
| 2007–2008 | Cruzeiro | 39 | (9) |
| 2008 | → Kashima Antlers (loan) | 12 | (0) |
| 2009–2012 | Atlético Paranaense | 84 | (20) |
| 2010–2011 | → Al-Ahli (loan) | 27 | (10) |
| 2012 | Ponte Preta | 28 | (3) |
| 2013 | Red Bull Brasil | 12 | (1) |
| 2014 | Ituano | 7 | (0) |
| 2015 | Cabofriense | 12 | (2) |
| 2015 | Amparo | 6 | (1) |

International career
| 1998–2002 | Brazil U20 | | |
| 2003 | Brazil U23 | 4 | (0) |
| 2005 | Brazil | 1 | (0) |

Managerial career
- 2019: Ituano U15
- 2020: Ituano U17
- 2020–2022: Red Bull Bragantino (assistant)
- 2020: Red Bull Bragantino (interim)
- 2022: Red Bull Bragantino (interim)
- 2023–2024: Ituano
- * Club domestic league appearances and goals

Márcio Miranda Freitas Rocha da Silva (born 20 March 1981), commonly known as Marcinho, is a Brazilian football coach and former player who played as either an attacking midfielder or a forward.

== Club career ==
Born in Campinas, Marcinho played for Corinthians, Palmeiras, Paulista and São Caetano. He was loaned to Kashima Antlers on 24 June 2008, and played for the Japanese squad until the end of the season.

Marcinho signed for Atlético Paranaense on 12 January 2009. In January 2010 he joined Al-Ahli on loan.

== International career ==
Marcinho made one and only appearance for Brazil in 3-0 win in a friendly game against Guatemala in São Paulo on 27 April 2005.

== Career statistics ==
=== International ===
Brazil national team
| Year | Apps | Goals |
|---|---|---|
| 2005 | 1 | 0 |
| Total | 1 | 0 |

== Honours ==
=== Club ===
Etti Jundiaí

- Campeonato Brasileiro Série C: 2001

Corinthians

- Copa do Brasil: 2002
- Torneio Rio-São Paulo: 2002

São Caetano

- Campeonato Paulista: 2004

Ituano

- Campeonato Paulista: 2014

Cruzeiro

- Campeonato Mineiro: 2008

Kashima Antlers

- J1 League: 2008

Atlético Paranaense

- Campeonato Paranaense: 2009

Al-Ahli

- Saudi Champions Cup : 2011

=== International ===
Brazil U20

- South American Youth Championship: 2001
