= Luís Augusto =

Brazilian footballer

Personal information
- Full name: Luís Augusto Osório Romão do Nascimento
- Date of birth: 20 November 1983 (age 42)
- Place of birth: Oeiras, Brazil
- Height: 1.73 m (5 ft 8 in)
- Position: Attacking midfielder

Youth career
- Santos

Senior career*
Years	Team	Apps	(Gls)
2004–2008	Santos	27	(0)
2005	→ Paysandu (loan)	30	(6)
2006	→ Yokohama FC (loan)	34	(6)
2007	→ Oita Trinita (loan)	11	(2)
2008	Albirex Niigata	4	(0)
2011	Bragantino	0	(0)
2012	Comercial-SP	8	(1)
2012	Guarany de Sobral	5	(0)
2013	Brasiliense	3	(0)
2015	River	5	(0)
- * Club domestic league appearances and goals

Luís Augusto Osório Romão do Nascimento (born 20 November 1983), known as Luís Augusto, is a Brazilian retired footballer who played as an attacking midfielder.

== Club statistics ==
Club performance			League		Cup		League Cup		Total	
Season	Club	League	Apps	Goals	Apps	Goals	Apps	Goals	Apps	Goals
Japan			League		Emperor's Cup		J.League Cup		Total	
2006	Yokohama FC	J2 League	34	6	1	0	-		35	6
2007	Oita Trinita	J1 League	11	2	1	1	3	2	15	5
2008	Albirex Niigata	J1 League	4	0	0	0	1	0	5	0
Country	Japan		49	8	2	1	4	2	55	11
Total			49	8	2	1	4	2	55	11
