= Cristiano Ávalos =

Brazilian footballer (born 1977)

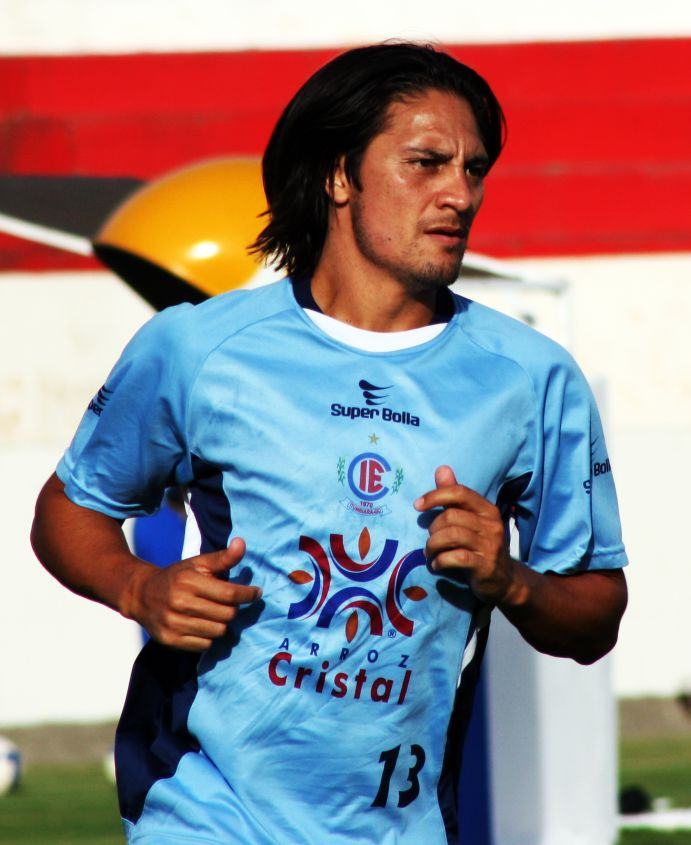

Personal information
- Full name: Cristiano Espindola de Ávalos dos Passos
- Date of birth: 27 December 1977 (age 48)
- Place of birth: Cascavel, Brazil
- Height: 1.83 m (6 ft 0 in)
- Position: Centre-back

Senior career*
Years	Team	Apps	(Gls)
1996–1997	Cascavel		
1997	Atlético Paranaense		
1999–2001	Comercial de Ribeirão Preto		
2002–2003	Paraná		
2004	Suwon Samsung Bluewings		
2004–2007	Santos		
2007	Sport		
2007	São Caetano		
2008	Grêmio Barueri		
2009	Itumbiara		
2010	Monte Azul		
2010	America-RJ	2	(0)
2011	Volta Redonda		
2011	Vilavelhense		
2012	São José		
2012	Remo	6	(1)
2013	Brasil de Farroupilha		
2014	Futebol Clube Cascavel		
- * Club domestic league appearances and goals

Cristiano Espindola de Ávalos dos Passos (born 27 December 1977) is a Brazilian former professional footballer who played as a centre-back.

== Career ==
Ávalos played for Cascavel, Atlético Paranaense, Comercial de Ribeirão Preto, Paraná, Suwon Samsung Bluewings, Santos, São Caetano, Grêmio Barueri, Itumbiara, Monte Azul, America-RJ, Volta Redonda, Vilavelhense, São José, Remo, Brasil de Farroupilha and Cascavel.
