= Mogi Mirim =

- Municipality
- Municipality of Mogi Mirim
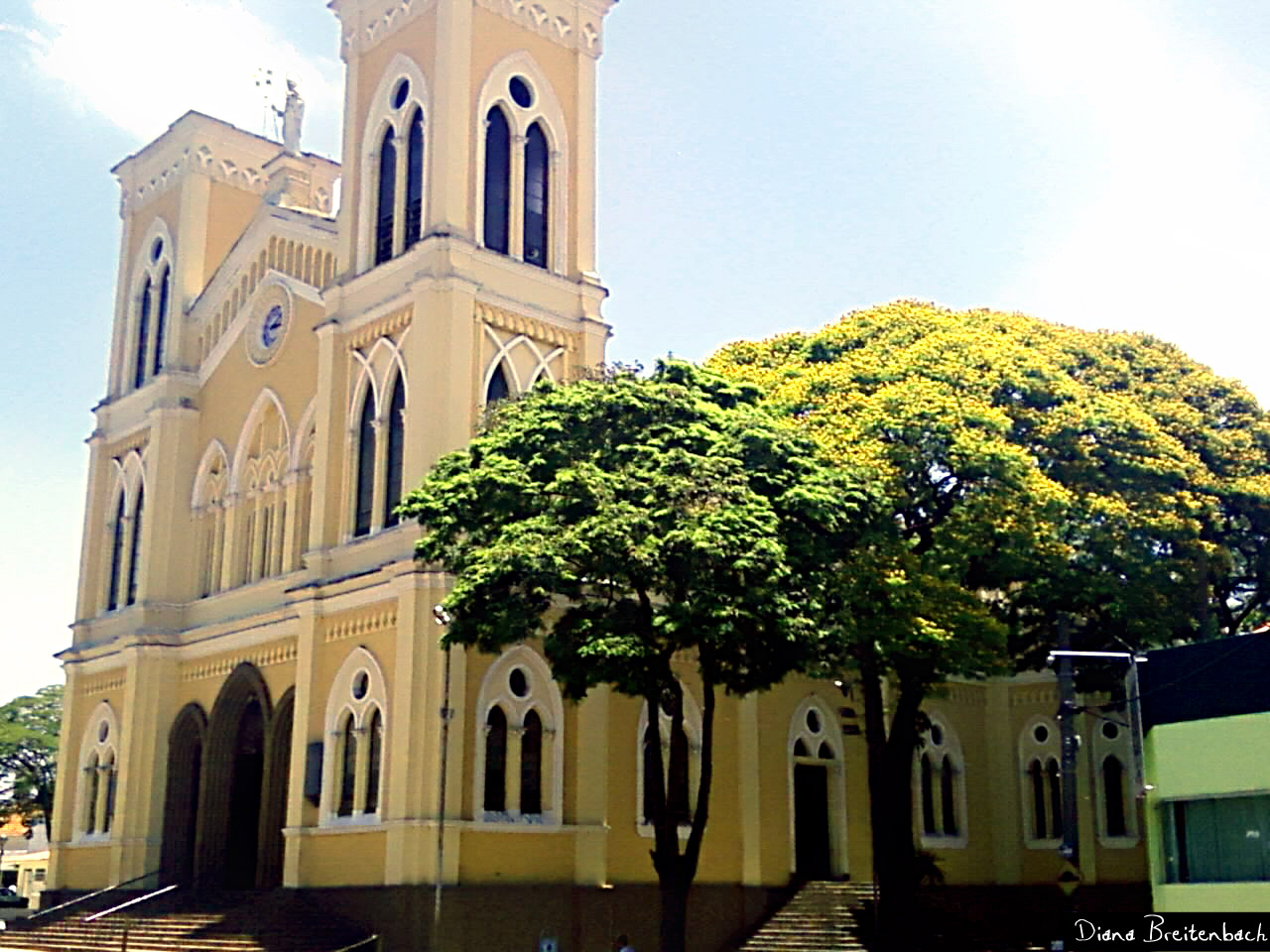

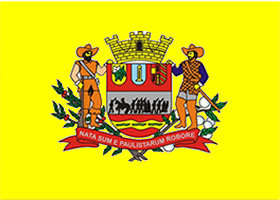
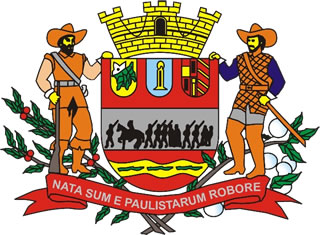
- Flag Coat of arms
- Nickname: Mogi
- Motto(s): "Nata sum e paulistarum robore" (Latin) "I was born the bravery of Paulistas"

- Location in Brazil
- Coordinates: 22°25′55″S 46°57′28″W
- Country: Brazil
- Region: Southeast
- State: São Paulo
- Founded: October 22, 1769

Government
  - Mayor: Paulo Silva (2020–2028)

Area
  - Total: 498 km^{2} (192 sq mi)
- Elevation: 611 m (2,005 ft)

Population (2020)
  - Total: 93,650
  - Density: 188/km^{2} (487/sq mi)
- Demonym: Mogimiriano
- Time zone: UTC−3 (BRT)
  - Summer (DST): UTC−2 (BRST)
- Postal Code (CEP): 13800-000
- Area code: +55 19
- HDI (2010): 0.784 – high
- Website: mogimirim.sp.gov.br

Mogi Mirim is a municipality located in the eastern part of São Paulo State, in Brazil. The population is 93,650 (2020 est.) in an area of 498 km^{2}. The elevation is 611 m.

Mogi Mirim is around 65 km from Campinas, the biggest city in the region, and 129 km from the capital São Paulo.

== Name ==
The origin of the name Mogi Mirim is the Tupi language, a Brazilian indigenous language. The name of the city means "small snakes' river" in English.

- mog translates to snake
- i translates to river
- mirim translates to small

== Demography ==
Historical population (municipality)
Year	Population	%±
1920	37,700
1940	40,625	7.8%
1950	29,783	−26.7%
1960	27,783	−6.7%
1970	36,301	30.7%
1980	50,633	39.5%
1991	64,753	27.9%
2000	81,467	25.8%
2010	86,505	6.2%
2022	92,558	7.0%

== Economy ==
The local economy have high contribution from agricultural and industrial activities.

The main agricultural goods produced are tomatoes, cassava, sugarcane and oranges.

The main industrial chain is auto parts manufacture, but there are also beverage, shoes and small size industry. Some large companies have operations in the City as Mars (Petcare), Alpargatas and Monroe.

== Media ==
In telecommunications, the city was served by Companhia Telefônica Brasileira until 1973, when it began to be served by Telecomunicações de São Paulo. In July 1998, this company was acquired by Telefónica, which adopted the Vivo brand in 2012.

The company is currently an operator of cell phones, fixed lines, internet (fiber optics/4G) and television (satellite and cable).

== Sport ==
The local soccer team is Mogi Mirim Sport Club that nowadays plays in the first division from State League Campeonato Paulista and in the second division from the National League Campeonato Brasileiro.

One famous player that played for this team in the 90's is Rivaldo, a world champion with the Brazilian team in the 2002 World Cup.

== Religion ==
Christianity is present in the city as follows:

=== Catholic Church ===
The Catholic church in the municipality is part of the Roman Catholic Diocese of Amparo.

=== Protestant Church ===
The most diverse evangelical beliefs are present in the city, mainly Pentecostal, including the Assemblies of God in Brazil (the largest evangelical church in the country), Christian Congregation in Brazil, among others. These denominations are growing more and more throughout Brazil.

== See also ==
- List of municipalities in São Paulo
