= Claiton (footballer, born 1978) =

Brazilian footballer (born 1978)

Personal information
- Full name: Claiton Alberto Fontoura dos Santos
- Date of birth: 25 January 1978 (age 48)
- Place of birth: Porto Alegre, Brazil
- Height: 1.79 m (5 ft 10 in)
- Position: Midfielder

Team information
- Current team: Porto Velho (coach)

Youth career
- 1995: Internacional

Senior career*
Years	Team	Apps	(Gls)
1997	Bahia	0	(0)
1998–1999	Internacional	37	(2)
2000	Vitória	20	(2)
2001	Bahia	0	(0)
2001	Servette	15	(1)
2002–2003	Internacional	65	(0)
2004	Santos	9	(1)
2004–2005	Nagoya Grampus Eight	44	(7)
2006	Botafogo	31	(3)
2007	Flamengo	21	(1)
2007	Atlético Paranaense	22	(0)
2008–2009	Consadole Sapporo	53	(6)
2009–2011	Atlético Paranaense	6	(0)
2012	Pelotas		
2012	Novo Hamburgo		
2013	Passo Fundo		
2013	Alecrim		

Managerial career
- 2016–2017: Aimoré
- 2018: São Paulo-RS
- 2019: Cruzeiro-RS
- 2020–: Porto Velho
- * Club domestic league appearances and goals

Claiton Alberto Fontoura dos Santos (born 25 January 1978), better known as Claiton, is a Brazilian football manager and former player who played as a midfielder.

== Career statistics ==
Appearances and goals by club, season and competition
Club	Season	League			National cup (Note: Includes Copa do Brasil, Schweizer Cup, Emperor's Cup.)		League cup (Note: Includes J.League Cup.)		Total	
Club	Season	Division	Apps	Goals	Apps	Goals	Apps	Goals	Apps	Goals
Bahia	1997	Série A	0	0					0	0
Internacional	1998	Série A	19	1					19	1
Internacional	1999	Série A	18	1					18	1
Internacional	Total		37	2					37	2
Vitória	2000	Série A	20	2					20	2
Bahia	2001	Série A	0	0					0	0
Servette	2001–02	Nationalliga A	15	1					15	1
Internacional	2002	Série A	24	0					24	0
Internacional	2003	Série A	41	0					41	0
Internacional	Total		65	0					65	0
Santos	2004	Série A	9	1					9	1
Nagoya Grampus Eight	2004	J1 League	13	3	2	0	4	0	19	3
Nagoya Grampus Eight	2005	J1 League	31	4	1	0	6	0	38	4
Nagoya Grampus Eight	Total		44	7	3	0	10	0	57	7
Botafogo	2006	Série A	31	3					31	3
Flamengo	2007	Série A	5	1					5	1
Atlético Paranaense	2007	Série A	22	2					22	2
Consadole Sapporo	2008	J1 League	30	2	1	0	6	0	37	2
Consadole Sapporo	2009	J2 League	23	4	0	0	-		23	4
Consadole Sapporo	Total		53	6	1	0	16	0	60	6
Atlético Paranaense	2009	Série A								
Career total			301	25	4	0	16	0	321	25

== Honours ==
Internacional

- Campeonato Gaúcho: 1997, 2002, 2003

Vitória

- Campeonato Baiano: 2000

Bahia

- Campeonato Baiano: 2001
- Campeonato do Nordeste: 2001

Santos

- Campeonato Brasileiro Série A: 2004

Flamengo

- Taça Guanabara: 2007
- Campeonato Carioca: 2007
