= List of goalscoring goalkeepers =

List of goalkeepers who have scored goals

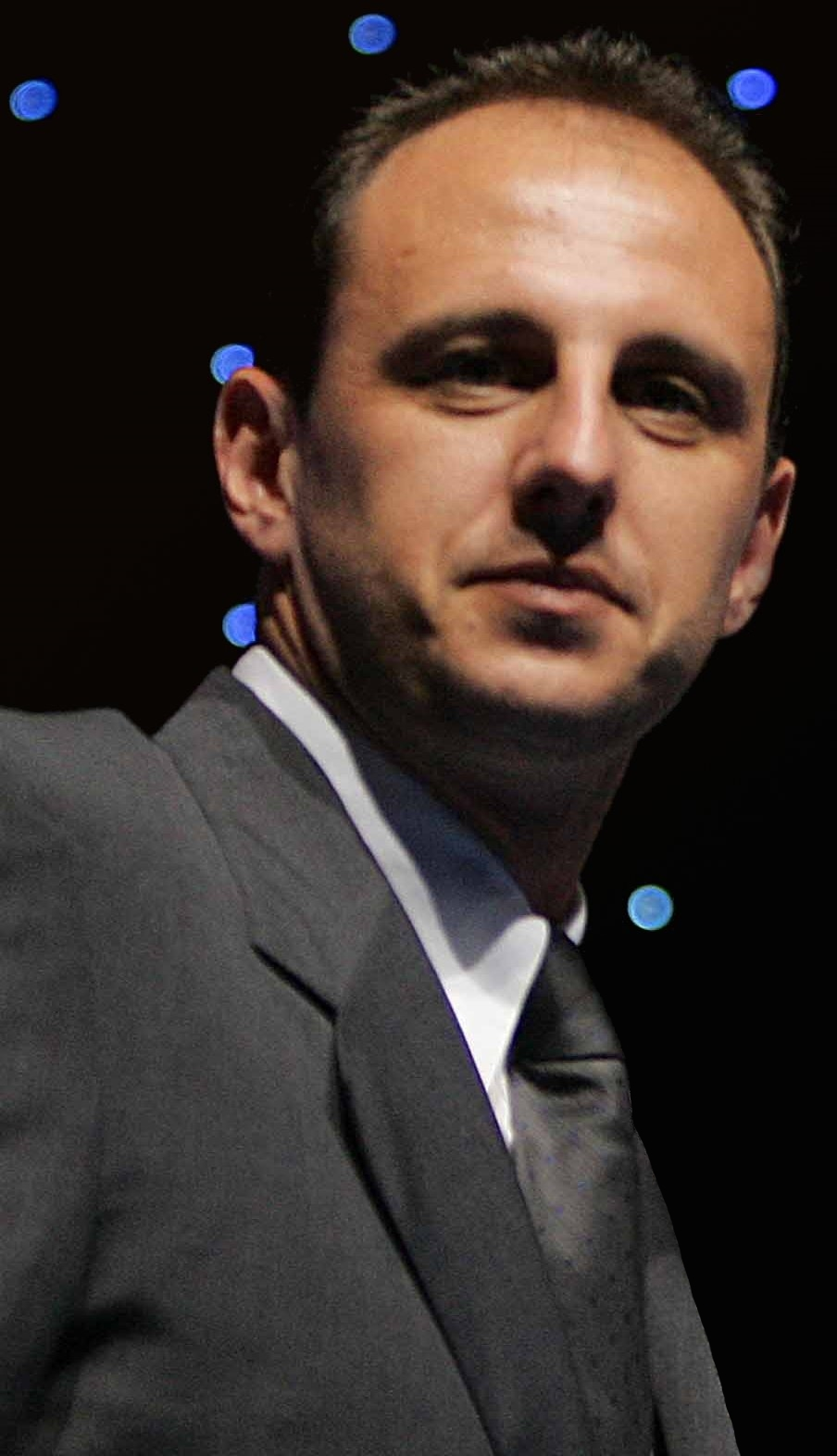
Rogério Ceni has scored more goals than any other goalkeeper.

Goals scored by goalkeepers are a somewhat rare event in football. Goalkeepers spend the majority of a match in the penalty area of their own team, a marked area around the goal they are defending in which they can handle the ball in order to defend their goal. It is highly unusual for a goalkeeper to move far beyond this area and join an attack, as this leaves the defence vulnerable to long-distance attempts until the goalkeeper can return to defend it.

The most prolific goalscoring goalkeepers are those who take penalties or free kicks. Other occasions where goalkeepers sometimes score include set pieces where a goalkeeper joins an attack when a team desperately needs a goal to win or prevent a defeat, or from goal kicks or otherwise regular clearances which travel the length of the pitch into the opposite goal. These types of instances are generally extremely rare and when they do happen it is generally considered a fluke or a stroke of luck rather than the intended consequence.

== Records ==
The record for most goals scored by goalkeeper is held by the Brazilian Rogério Ceni, with 129 goals. He scored his 100th goal in a 3–0 win for São Paulo on 4 August 2011.

In addition to having the second most goals (67), Paraguayan José Luis Chilavert has recorded the most goals scored in international matches (8), is the first goalkeeper to score a hat-trick, and in 2000, while playing with Vélez Sarsfield, he and Argentine goalkeeper Roberto Bonano with River Plate both scored in the same Copa Mercosur match.

On 2 November 2013, Stoke City goalkeeper Asmir Begović scored a goal which was the fastest for a professional goalkeeper in football history (13 seconds).

On 27 April 1985, SV Darmstadt 98 goalkeeper Wilhelm Huxhorn broke the record for the longest goal in football history (103 metres / 112.6 yards), in a match against Fortuna Köln. However, the longest goal to have been officially recorded in the Guinness World Records was scored by Tom King of Newport County, on 19 January 2021 against Cheltenham Town. The goal was confirmed to be 96.01 metres (105 yd) long.

== List ==
The following list comprises goalkeepers who have scored in a professional national or international competition. The following table does not include goalkeepers' goals in friendly matches with clubs, nor does it include amateur or youth matches.

Bold names indicate keepers active during the 2025–26 season.

Player	Nation	Years	Team(s)	Goals	Notes
Rogério Ceni	Brazil	1990–2015	São Paulo	131	Record for a goalkeeper, record number of free kicks (59), record number of penalties (69), record number of total goals (131). Scored 14 goals (six free kicks and eight penalties) in Copa Libertadores and 65 (26 free kicks, one indirect free kick and 38 penalties) in Brazilian League. Had five matches with two goals.
José Luis Chilavert	Paraguay	1982–2004	Paraguay, Sportivo Luqueno, Guaraní, San Lorenzo, Zaragoza, Vélez Sársfield, Strasbourg, Peñarol	67	Record number of international goals (8), first goalkeeper to score a hat trick (3 goals in a single game). 62 goals considered by IFFHS and more 5 goals scored at the Paraguayan Primera División.
Jorge Campos	Mexico	1988–2004	Pumas UNAM, Atlante, L. A. Galaxy	46	Scored 28 goals for Pumas playing as striker while Adolfo Ríos was the goalkeeper (1989–1991). In the majority of his goals, he played outfield while another goalkeeper entered as a substitute. 44 goals scored for Pumas, 1 for Atlante and 1 for LA Galaxy.
Johnny Vegas Fernández	Peru	1997–2017	Sport Boys, Union Huaral, Universidad San Martín de Porres, FBC Melgar, Sport Ancash, Cienciano, Alianza Atlético, Club Deportivo Pacífico FC, Defensor San Alejandro, Los Caimanes	45	Forty goals in first division, one goal in Copa Sudamericana and four goals in second division
René Higuita	Colombia	1985–2009	Colombia, Atlético Nacional, Veracruz, Independiente Medellín, Real Cartagena, Bajo Cauca FC, Deportivo Rionegro	43	
Dimitar Ivankov	Bulgaria	1996–2012	Levski Sofia, Kayserispor, Bursaspor	42	Highest-scoring European goalkeeper. Highest-scoring goalkeeper who has played only in top-division football clubs in UEFA countries
**Fábio Rampi**	Brazil	2008–	Cruzeiro-RS, São José-RS	41	2 goals for Cruzeiro-RS (2011), 39 goals for São José-RS (2015–present). Goals scored at Campeonato Brasileiro Série C, Campeonato Brasileiro Série D, Copa do Brasil, Campeonato Gaúcho and Copa FGF.
Márcio	Brazil	2002–2019	Atlético Goianiense, Goiás, Goiânia	40	37 goals for Atlético Goianiense (2007–2015), one for Goiás (2016) and two for Goiânia (2019)
Fernando Patterson	Costa Rica	1989–2013	Xelajú, Cobán Imperial, Puntarenas, Ramonense	35	
Hans-Jörg Butt	Germany	1994–2012	VfB Oldenburg, Hamburger SV, Bayer Leverkusen, Bayern Munich, Bayern Munich II	33	Record number of penalty goals in a single professional league of Europe (26 in 1. Bundesliga); includes three goals in UEFA Champions League (record for a goalkeeper), one in the German League Cup, one in the 2. Bundesliga, one in the 2. Bundesliga play-off, and one in the 3. Liga.
Misael Alfaro	El Salvador	1988–2010	Luis Ángel Firpo, San Salvador, Águila, Alianza, Metapán	31	
Dragan Pantelić	Yugoslavia	1971–1985	Yugoslavia, Radnički Niš, Bordeaux	29	24 for Radnički Niš, 3 for Bordeaux, 2 for Yugoslavia.
Exar Rosales	Peru	2003–2021	Los Caimanes, Atlético Minero, Deportivo Municipal, Comerciantes Unidos, Juan Aurich	26	
**Gaspar Servio**	Argentina	2012–	Banfield, Independiente Rivadavia, Guaraní, Rosario Central, Tacuary	26	1 goal for Banfield, 1 for Independiente Rivadavia, 19 for Guaraní, 4 for Rosario Central, 1 for Tacuary.
Žarko Lučić	Serbia and Montenegro; Montenegro	1992–2008	Rudar Pljevlja, Budućnost Podgorica, Kom Podgorica, Mladost Podgorica	25	
Marco Cornez	Chile	1982–1995	Palestino	24	Most goals by a goalkeeper in Chile
Vincent Enyeama	Nigeria	1999–2018	Ibom Stars, Enyimba, Hapoel Tel Aviv	24	Was the main penalty taker for Hapoel Tel Aviv
Rafael Dudamel	Venezuela	1989–2010	Venezuela, Santa Fe, Zulia, Quilmes, Deportivo Cali, Unión Maracaíbo, Estudiantes de Mérida	22	
Phan Văn Santos	Vietnam	1997–2014	Đồng Tâm Long An, Navibank Saigon	22	Highest-scoring goalkeeper in all of Asia. First goalkeeper to score in an AFC Champions League match.
Nizami Sadıqov	Azerbaijan		Turan Tovuz	21	
Cristian Lucchetti	Argentina	1995–2023	Banfield, Atlético Tucumán	20	19 for Banfield, 1 for Atlético Tucumán.
Sebastián Saja	Argentina	2000–2017	San Lorenzo, Grêmio, Racing	20	12 for San Lorenzo, 7 for Racing, 1 for Grêmio.
Wilson	Brazil	2005–2024	Figueirense, Coritiba	19	17 penalties, 1 free kick and 1 header. 8 for Figueirense, 11 for Coritiba
Tiago Campagnaro	Brazil	2003–2016	Portuguesa, Vasco da Gama	18	
**Tiago Volpi**	Brazil	2010–	Toluca, Grêmio, Red Bull Bragantino	18	All goals scored from penalties, starting in 2022 with Toluca, 15 penalties with Toluca, 2 with Grêmio, 1 with Bragantino.
Miguel Ángel Ortiz	Argentina	1965–1979	Montevideo Wanderers, Atlético Mineiro, Comercial	17	All penalties. 9 for Montevideo Wanderers, 7 for Atlético Mineiro, and 1 for Comercial.
Sebastián Bertoli	Argentina	1997–2019	Patronato	16	
Marijan Jantoljak	Yugoslavia	1958–1978	Rijeka, Borac Banja Luka, Metalac Sisak	16	
Luis Ardente	Argentina	2001–2023	San Martín de San Juan	15	All penalties
**Denis Espinoza**	Nicaragua	2002–	Nicaragua, Walter Ferretti, San Marcos	15	Penalty at 2011 Copa Centroamericana
Ante Vulić	Yugoslavia	1951–1962	Hajduk Split	15	All penalties. In addition to official goals, he also scored 14 goals in friendly matches.
Marcelo León	Chile	1985–2003	Deportes Puerto Montt, Deportes Temuco	14	All penalties.
Kennedy Mweene	Zambia	2003–2023	Zambia, Free State Stars	14	Twelve penalties, as well as an equalizing goal against Nigeria in an Africa Cup of Nations group stage match on 25 January 2013. He scored another goal in the Africa Cup of Nations qualifiers against Niger, where Zambia won 3–0 on 15 October 2014, with Mweene scoring a late penalty in the 90th minute.
Gilbert Bodart	Belgium	1981–2002	Standard Liège	14	
Ignacio González	Argentina	1991–2008	Racing, Las Palmas	14	Joint-highest scoring goalkeeper in La Liga history with six goals (all penalties for Las Palmas)
Anton Švajlen	Czechoslovakia	1959–1975	VSS Košice	13	11 league penalties, one UEFA Cup penalty, 1 goal for Czechoslovakia B
Mircea Bornescu	Romania	1999–2017	Extensiv Craiova, Universitatea Craiova	13	All penalties
Mykhaylo Burch	Soviet Union; Ukraine	1977–2002	Volyn Lutsk, Veres Rivne, Sokil Zolochiv	13	All penalties
Andrés Peláez	Colombia	2003–2013	Unión Magdalena, Valledupar	13	All penalties
Alejandro Sinisterra	Colombia	1961–1971	Cúcuta Deportivo, Bucaramanga, Deportivo Cali	13	
Philippe Vande Walle	Belgium	1979–2000	Germinal Ekeren	13	
**Tadeu**	Brazil	2013–	Ferroviária, Goiás	13	Penalty kick scored against Red Bull Brasil, 24 March 2018, at Troféu do Interior., four in the 2024 Campeonato Brasileiro Série B,, six in 2025 season, two in 2026 season.
Sebastián Viera	Uruguay	2003–2023	Junior	13	Nine free kicks and two penalties. 11 league goals and 2 international goals.
Danilo Aceval	Paraguay	1994–2007	Cerro Porteño, Ñublense	12	8 for Cerro Porteño, 4 for Ñublense.
Mario Bytyçi	Albania	2003–2022	Skrapari, Kamza, Butrinti Sarandë, Mamurras, Bylis Ballsh	12	All penalties
Isli Hidi	Albania	1998–2023	Olympiakos Nicosia, Bylis Ballsh, Erzeni	12	1 for Olympiakos Nicosia, 8 for Bylis, 3 for Erzeni
Tony Read	England	1964–1972	Luton Town	12	Scored whilst playing as a striker, including one hat-trick
**Diego Rodríguez**	Argentina	2011–	Independiente, Godoy Cruz	12	All penalties
Hugo Suárez	Bolivia	2001–2020	Jorge Wilstermann, Real Potosí, Blooming	12	
Patricio Álvarez	Peru	2012-	Universitario de Deportes, Foot Ball Club Melgar, Sporting Cristal, Sport Boys, Cienciano, Atlético Grau	11	
Andriy Dykan	Ukraine	1995–2016	Avanhard Rovenky, SKA-Energiya Khabarovsk	11	Two goals scored as an outfield player for Avanhard, nine penalty goals for SKA-Energiya
Dimitris Gakis	Greece	1974–1989	Panetolikos	11	Eleven penalties scored during the 1983–84 season of the Greek second division
Nelson Ramos	Colombia	2011–2022	Deportivo Pasto, Millonarios, América de Cali, Boca Juniors de Cali	11	Scored from a free kick and had one assist on 17 September 2016 In 2021, Ramos set a record after being the first goalkeeper to score goals from free kicks in three consecutive matches.
Peter Schmeichel	Denmark	1981–2003	Denmark, Hvidovre, Brøndby, Manchester United, Aston Villa	11	
Imrich Stacho	Czechoslovakia	1947–1966	Czechoslovakia, Spartak Trnava	11	Scored the first international goal by a goalkeeper. All penalties
Julián Viáfara	Colombia	1996–2013	América de Cali, Vitória, Deportes Quindío	11	
Gastón Losa	Argentina	1997–2018	Deportes La Serena, All Boys	10	9 goals for La Serena, 1 goal for All Boys.
Christian Piot	Belgium	1966–1978	Belgium, Standard Liège	10	
Mario Villasanti	Paraguay	2003–2019	Ayacucho	10	
Ekrem Aydın	Turkey		Sivasspor, D.Ç. Divriğispor, Tokatspor, Aksarayspor	9	All penalties
Iván Brun	Argentina	2004–2023	Cruz del Sur, Petrolero, Mushuc Runa, Universitario de Sucre	9	
Miguel Ego	Peru	1983–1997	Alianza Atlético, Atlético Torino	9	
Frans Hoek	Netherlands	1973–1985	Volendam	9	
César Silva	Brazil	1990–2000	Avaí	9	
Alexis Viera	Uruguay	1995–2015	América de Cali	9	
Des Cross	England	1950–1951	Margate FC	8	Scored eight goals for Margate after being played upfront as an emergency striker.
Jefferson	Brazil	1995–2015	Horizonte, Maracanã	8	Goals scored at Campeonato Cearense and Campeonato Cearense Série B.
Ioan Pap-Deac	Romania	1989–2004	Baia Mare	8	
Ernald Scattergood	England	1907–1925	Derby County, Bradford Park Avenue	8	
Kostyantyn Starodubovskyi	Ukraine		Dnister Ovidiopol	8	All penalties
Tigre	Brazil	2001–2022	Atlético de Alagoinhas	8	
János Bojtor	Romania	1978–1991	Înfrățirea Oradea, Bihor Oradea, Jiul Petroșani, Progresul Timișoara	7	All penalties
**Enrique Bologna**	Argentina	2003–	Banfield, Alianza Lima, Unión de Santa Fe	7	Scored four goals for Alianza, two goals for Unión and one goal for Banfield, all from the penalty spot (including one scored from a penalty rebound)
Bruno	Brazil	2002–2023	Flamengo, Rio Branco, Atlético Carioca	7	Three free kicks and four penalties
Ihor Hymanych	Ukraine		Desna Chernihiv, Slavutych	7	All penalties
**Angelo Konstantinou**	Australia	2015–	Canberra Olympic	7	Five goals scored in the National Premier Leagues, two goals scored in the FFA Cup
Răducanu Necula	Romania	1965–1982	Rapid București	7	
Ilija Pantelić	Yugoslavia	1961–1977	Vojvodina	7	Scored at least 7 goals.
Anatoly Pata	Soviet Union; Ukraine		Dynamo Stavropol, Kavkaztransgaz Ryzdvyany	7	All penalties
Nihad Pejković	Yugoslavia; Bosnia and Herzegovina	1991–2005	Olimpija Ljubljana	7	
Ognjen Petrović	Yugoslavia	1967–1978	Red Star Belgrade; Bastia	7	Scored at least 7 goals, one of them scored in the 1974–75 European Cup Winners' Cup
Miloš Radanović	Serbia and Montenegro; Montenegro	2001–2017	Rudar Pljevlja	7	All penalties
Hamood Sultan	Bahrain	1974–1998	Muharraq	7	Scored at least 7 goals, all of them penalties
Fridolin Wenger	Switzerland	1907–1916	Basel	7	Scored seven goals, four of which in test games and three in the domestic league during the FC Basel 1912–13 season.
Róbinson Zapata	Colombia	1998–2020	Real Cartagena, América de Cali, Santa Fe	7	
Nico van Zoghel	Netherlands	1960–1979	Go Ahead Eagles, DOS	7	Eredivisie-record scoring goalkeeper with 7, including 6 for Go Ahead Eagles. All penalties.
Bengt Andersson	Sweden	1984–2013	Brage, Örgryte	6	
Esteban Conde	Uruguay	2003–2022	Danubio	6	
Luis Delgado	Colombia	2001–2021	Millonarios, Águilas Doradas	6	All goals scored from free kicks
**Matías Dituro**	Argentina	2007–	Bolívar, Antofagasta, Jorge Wilstermann	6	Scored six professional goals. Four were penalty kicks, one a long kick from his own penalty area, and the sixth a header.
Carlos Fenoy	Argentina	1970–1988	Celta Vigo, Valladolid	6	Joint-highest scoring goalkeeper in La Liga history with six goals (five for Celta Vigo and one for Valladolid, all penalties)
Johnny Herrera	Chile	1999–2020	Universidad de Chile, Everton	6	All penalties
Alexánder Jara	Costa Rica	2001–2007	Puntarenas, Brujas	6	Scored four penalties and two free kicks
**Jean**	Brazil	2015–	Atlético Goianiense	6	
George Kitchen	England	1897–1914?	West Ham United	6	All penalties
Dražen Ladić	Yugoslavia; Croatia	1980–2000	Dinamo Zagreb, Iskra Bugojno	6	1 goal for Dinamo Zagreb, 5 goals for Iskra Bugojno.
Jákup Mikkelsen	Faroe Islands	1991–2014	KÍ Klaksvík, Herfølge Boldklub	6	All penalties (four for Klaksvík, two for Herfølge)
Les Pogliacomi	Australia	1994–2019	Wollongong Wolves	6	
Nikos Sarganis	Greece	1978–1993	Olympiacos, Panathinaikos	6	
Harry Schellekens	Netherlands	1970–1988	NEC, Groningen	6	All penalties
Thyago	Brazil	2012–2023	Riopardense, Jabaquara	6	1 free kick and 2 penalties scored at Campeonato Paulista Segunda Divisão. Scored another 3 goals for Riopardense in 2013 Campeonato Gaúcho Série B.
Ronald Yávar	Chile	1977-1997	Trasandino, Unión Española	6	All penalties.
Luis Barbat	Uruguay	1985–2009	Independiente Medellín, Tolima, América de Cali	5	
Arnold Birch	England	1918–1929	Chesterfield	5	
Alin Bota	Romania	2003–2021	Baia Mare, Maramureș	5	
Carlos Chávez	Colombia	2003–2016	Patriotas, Atlético Bucaramanga	5	All penalties
Luis Gabelo Conejo	Costa Rica	1981–1997	Ramonense	5	All penalties and free kicks
Fred Craig	Scotland	1912?–1930?	Plymouth Argyle	5	All penalties
Julio César Falcioni	Argentina	1976–1991	América de Cali	5	
Tubo Fernández	Argentina	1978–1997	Lleida	5	
Ferreira	Brazil	2006–2022	Desportiva Guarabira, Força e Luz, Potiguar de Mossoró, Olímpico	5	Goals scored at the Campeonato Paraibano, Campeonato Potiguar and Campeonato Brasileiro Série D.
**Akram El Hadi Salim**	Sudan	2004–	Kober, Alamal Atbara	5	He scored at least five goals, four penalties with Kober, and a direct free kick with Alamal Atbara.
**Stefan Hagerup**	Norway	2013–	Ull/Kisa	5	All free kicks.
Ergilio Hato	Curaçao	1946–1958	Curaçao	5	Two penalties and three goals while playing as a forward at 1953 CCCF Championship. Possibly scored more goals playing for CRKSV Jong Holland.
**Levente Jova**	Hungary	2010–	Nyíregyháza	5	
Elvis Kotorri	Albania	1996–2018	Elbasani	5	All penalties
Víctor Loyola	Chile	2001–2011	Santiago Morning	5	Scored as a forward in Chilean play-offs
Andrejs Piedels	Latvia	1992–2010	Amstrig	5	
Józef Pokorski	Poland	1934–1956	Lechia Gdańsk	5	Scored penalties against PTC Pabianice, Skra Częstochowa, Gwardia Olsztyn, Bzura Chodaków and Gedania Gdańsk. All five goals came in divisional playoff matches.
Diego Pozo	Argentina	1995–2014	Godoy Cruz	5	
Fayz Al-Sabiay	Saudi Arabia	2002–2017	Al-Khaleej	5	
Lucidio Sentimenti	Italy	1940–1959	Modena, Juventus, Lazio	5	
**Diogo Silva**	Brazil	2005–	CRB, Ponte Preta	5	Scored two penalties goals against Grêmio, 13 August 2022, at 2022 Campeonato Brasileiro Série B. and at Campeonato Alagoano and Copa do Nordeste. Also scored for Ponte Preta against CSA in the 2025 Campeonato Brasileiro Série C.
Lajos Szűcs	Hungary	1994–2016	Ferencváros, Újpest	5	All penalties
Vilmos Zombori	Romania	1926–1947	Ripensia Timişoara	5	
**Pablo Gavilán**	Paraguay	2011	Club River Plate (Asunción)	5	
Samir Aboud	Libya	1991–2013	Al-Ittihad	4	Scored four goals in his career, all penalties.
Ronny Aloema	Suriname	2002–2017	Suriname	4	
Máximo Banguera	Ecuador	2004–2022	Barcelona SC	4	
Laurence Batty	England	1982–2003	Woking	4	
**Etrit Berisha**	Albania	2008–	Kalmar FF	4	Took penalties while at Kalmar FF
Miguel Ángel Calero	Colombia	1988–2011	Deportivo Cali, Pachuca	4	
Fabián Carini	Uruguay	1997–2017	Danubio, Standard Liège, Juventud de Las Piedras	4	
Gilmar Dal Pozzo	Brazil	1988–2007	Caxias	4	All penalties
Juan Flores	Peru	1994–2016	Universitario, Cienciano, Atlético Minero	4	
Eduardo Lobos	Chile	2000–2018	Chile U-20, Colo-Colo, Unión Española	4	One goal scored playing as a forward
Rasim Kara	Turkey	1972?–1984	Bursaspor, Beşiktaş	4	All penalties
Serhiy Kyrienko	Ukraine		Metalurh Nikopol	4	All penalties
Hamish McAlpine	Scotland	1966–1989	Dundee United, Raith Rovers	4	
**Bernardo Medina**	Paraguay	2006–	General Díaz	4	All penalties, scored in 2016 Paraguayan Primera División season.
Rodrigo Muñoz	Uruguay	2008–2024	Cerro, Libertad	4	3 goals for Cerro, 1 for Libertad.
Óscar Pérez	Mexico	1993–2019	Mexico U-23, Cruz Azul, Pachuca	4	Scored one goal for Mexico-U23, two goals for Cruz Azul (both from last minute corner headers) and one goal for Pachuca (also a last minute header). He is only 1.71 m (5 ft 7 1/2 in) tall.
Stipe Pletikosa	Croatia	1996–2016	Hajduk Split	4	All penalties
Mileta Radulović	Serbia and Montenegro; Montenegro	1999–2017	Grbalj, Petrovac	4	All penalties
Léo Flores	Brazil	2001–2025	Ceres, Império Serrano	4	Header against Independente, 24 september 2008, at Campeonato Carioca Série B, Penalty kick against Serrano, 27 september 2008, at Campeonato Carioca Série B, Penalty kick against Queimados, 24 september 2014, at Copa Rio, Free kick scored against Vera Cruz, 5 June 2022, at Campeonato Carioca Série C.
Ibrahim Salim Saad	Iraq	1988–2002	Salahaddin, Al-Karkh	4	All penalties
Ronny Sörensson	Sweden		Landskrona	4	
Mauricio Soria	Bolivia	1984–2005	Jorge Wilstermann	4	
Federico Vilar	Argentina	2000–2016	Atlante	4	Includes one goal scored in CONCACAF Champions League
Cheng Xiaopeng	China	2004–2011	Nanchang Hengyuan	4	All penalties
**Zé Carlos**	Brazil	2004–	Criciúma, Paraná	4	
**Grigoris Athanasiou**	Greece	2003–	Pavlos Melas Stavroupoli	3	Third known goalkeeper to have scored a hat-trick, 12 February 2022, at the Greek fourth division.
Pavlo Blazhaiev	Ukraine	1992–2005	Antratsyt Kirovske, CSKA Kyiv	3	Scored two free kicks for Antratsyt and one last minute header for CSKA Kyiv
Cristian Campestrini	Argentina	2001–2021	Argentino de Rosario, Tigre	3	
Santiago Castaño	United States	2013–2022	Socrates Valencia	3	Scored three goals (penalty kicks) during the 2017 season.
Sonny Dalesandro	United States	1995–2001	Tulsa Roughnecks	3	Scored three goals as a forward during the 1999 USISL season
Mohamed Al-Deayea	Saudi Arabia	1989–2010	Al Hilal	3	
Diego Cabral	Brazil	2008–2016	Santos do Amapá	3	
Roger Freestone	Wales	1986–2004	Swansea City, Chelsea, Newport County	3	
Diego Gómez	Colombia	1992–2010	Deportivo Pasto	3	
Richard Gray	England	1895–1902	Burton Swifts	3	
Dariusz Grubba	Poland	1995–2016	Bałtyk Gdynia	3	Playing as a striker
Harlei	Brazil	1990–2014	Comercial	3	Scored 3 goals, all penalties, during 1998 Campeonato Paulista Série A2 (against Ponte Preta, América and Sãocarlense).
Hiran	Brazil	1993–2017	Guarani, Santo André, Linhares	3	Scored two headers, against Palmeiras (1997) and Juventus (1999). After returning from retirement, he scored one last penalty goal (2011).
Zdeněk Jánoš	Czechoslovakia; Czech Republic	1988–1999	Jablonec, Slavia Prague	3	All penalties (two for Jablonec and one for Slavia Prague) Most goals by a goalkeeper in Czech First League history.
Kim Byung-ji	South Korea	1992–2015	Ulsan Hyundai Horang-i	3	First goalkeeper to score in a K League match
Ronaldo Koeman Jr.	Netherlands	2012–	Telstar	3	Became the first goalkeeper in the Eredivisie to score twice in one game.
**Marko Lazarević**	Serbia	2012–	Brodarac 1947, Radnički Beograd	3	
Dragoje Leković	Yugoslavia	1985–2003	Budućnost Titograd	3	
Erick Lonnis	Costa Rica	1985–2003	Saprissa	3	
Jimmy Maidment	England	1923–1934	Newport County	3	
Manga	Brazil	1955–1982	Sport Recife, Nacional, Internacional	3	Scored three goals. First a penalty kick in your farewell game by Sport Recife, 1959, the second scored directly from his area against Racing Montevideo in 1973, and the last converted a penalty against Gaúcho de Passo Fundo, at 1974 Campeonato Gaúcho
**Shpëtim Moçka**	Albania	2007–	Flamurtari Vlorë, Kastrioti Krujë, Teuta Durrës	3	Two penalties (against Dinamo Tirana and Apolonia Fier on 20 April 2011 and 10 February 2013, respectively) and a last-minute headed equaliser
Gustavo Munúa	Uruguay	1997–2015	Nacional, Deportivo La Coruña, Málaga	3	
Jérôme Palatsi	France	1989–2010	Beira-Mar, Vitória de Guimarães	3	
Milton Patiño	Colombia	1993–2011	Millonarios	3	
**Jorge Pinos**	Ecuador	2008–	Deportivo Quevedo	3	
James Raeside	Scotland		Bury	3	
David Reyes	Chile	2004–2021	Santiago Morning	3	
Antonio Rigamonti	Italy	1967–1986	Como	3	
Jacinto Rodríguez	Paraguay	1979–1997	Sport Boys	3	
Ulla-Karin Rönnlund	Sweden	1996–2009	Umeå	3	Scored one goal for Sweden U-20, a last minute goal in open play for Umeå and a penalty against Arsenal in the UEFA Women's Champions League.
**Yerko Urra**	Chile	2016–	Deportes Temuco	3	All headers.
Noel Valladares	Honduras	1996–2016	Motagua	3	
**Camilo Vargas**	Colombia	2009–	Santa Fe, Deportivo Cali	3	Two headers and one penalty.
Jörg Weißflog	East Germany; Germany	1975–1998	BSG Wismut Aue	3	A 90th-minute equaliser from open play against Carl Zeiss Jena in 1986 and two penalties against FC Karl-Marx-Stadt and Bischofswerdaer FV in 1986 and 1994 respectively.
Agenor	Brazil	2008–2023	Criciúma	2	Both penalties at 2020 Campeonato Brasileiro Série C.
An Qi	China	1999–2010	Dalian Changbo	2	Penalties scored at the 2005 China League One.
Carlos Arias	Uruguay		Cúcuta Deportivo, Unión Magdalena	2	
Ivan Balan	Soviet Union; Ukraine	1972–1980	Sudnobudivnyk Mykolayiv	2	
Willy Berger	Palestine; Israel	1925–1950	Hapoel Tel Aviv, Maccabi Tel Aviv	2	Scored penalty kicks in 1929 and 1934 cup finals.
Jim Brown	Scotland	1968–1989	Washington Diplomats, Chesterfield	2	
Jimmy Brownlie	Scotland	1902–1926	Third Lanark	2	Scored a goal at least twice for Third Lanark, the first a rebound from a penalty kick he had taken against Motherwell in 1911 and the other during the 1914–15 season.
Nikki Bull	England	2000–2021	Aldershot Town, Margate	2	
José Castañeda	Colombia		Atlético Nacional	2	
**Maximiliano Cavallotti**	Argentina	2007–	Gimnasia y Esgrima de Jujuy	2	Scored two goals. The first came in March 2015 as he scored a 91st-minute consolation in a 2–3 defeat to Atlético Paraná, before converting a penalty three months later in a 3–2 win over Chacarita Juniors.
**Faouzi Chaouchi**	Algeria	2003–	JS Kabylie, ES Sétif	2	
**José Luis Chunga**	Colombia	2011–	Alianza Petrolera	2	Scored in two different Alianza Petrolera matches in March 2022.
Clemer	Brazil	1987–2009	Portuguesa, Internacional	2	
Jimmy Crabtree	England	1911–1929	Rochdale	2	
Mario Cuenca	Argentina	1995–2009	Arsenal de Sarandi	2	
**Seny Dieng**	Senegal	2010–	Whitehawk, Queens Park Rangers	2	
Eduardo	Brazil	1998–2011	Bangu, Atlético Mineiro	2	
Emerson	Brazil	2003–2021	Guarani	2	
**Everson**	Brazil	2011–	Confiança, Ceará	2	Penalty kick against Estanciano, 24 April 2015, at Campeonato Sergipano, and a free kick scored against Corinthians, 5 September 2018, at Campeonato Brasileiro.
Luis Fernando Fernández	Colombia	2002	Junior	2	
Rowen Fernández	South Africa	1996–2014	Kaizer Chiefs	2	
Alan Fettis	Northern Ireland	1988?–2007	Hull City	2	Playing as a striker
**Arnaldo Giménez**	Paraguay; Bolivia	2008–	Unión La Calera	2	Both penalties.
**Josep Gómes**	Andorra	2004–	Fortuna, ES Pennoise	2	
Guan Zhen	China	2003–2020	Shijiazhuang Ever Bright	2	Penalties scored against Shanghai SIPG and Beijing Guoan in Chinese Super League matches played on 8 and 22 May 2016, respectively
Essam El-Hadary	Egypt	1993–2020	Al Ahly, Al-Taawoun	2	Scored an 80-metre indirect free kick that hit the bar, the opponent goalkeeper and then crossed the line in the CAF Super Cup, He also scored a penalty kick in the Saudi Professional League for Al-Taawoun
Raad Hammoudi	Iraq	1972–1987	Al-Shorta	2	Both penalties
Frédéric Herpoel	Belgium	1993–2010	Gent	2	
Deren Ibrahim	Gibraltar	2008–2019	Dartford	2	
Tomislav Ivković	Yugoslavia; Croatia	1978–1998	Dinamo Zagreb, Tirol Innsbruck	2	
Mu'izzuddin Ismail	Brunei	2009–2021	Menglait, MS PDB	2	
**Razak Issah**	Ghana	2010–	Cape Coast Ebusua Dwarfs	2	Free kick against Liberty Professionals on 3 April 2019. The second goal scored a last-minute winning goal from a direct free-kick against Elmina Sharks in a 2020–21 Ghana Premier League match
**João Costa**	Portugal	2012–	Portugal U-17, Porto B	2	
Juninho	Brazil	1999–2017	Paraná	2	Both penalties
Tvrtko Kale	Croatia	1994–2016	Hajduk Split, Hapoel Be'er Sheva	2	
Peter Kjær	Denmark	1983–2002	Silkeborg	2	
Otto Konrad	Austria	1981–2003	Sturm Graz, Austria Salzburg	2	
Andreas Köpke	West Germany; Germany	1979–2001	1. FC Nürnberg	2	Both penalties
Wolfgang Kneib	West Germany; Germany	1969–1993	Arminia Bielefeld	2	
Bernard Lama	France	1981–2001	Lille, Lens	2	Both penalties
Lauro	Brazil	2001–2019	Ponte Preta, Portuguesa	2	Both in headers in the stoppages time. The second goal was scored 10 years after the first, and against the same opponent (Flamengo)
Marcel Lăzăreanu	Romania	1973–1991	Universitatea Cluj	2	
Jens Lehmann	West Germany; Germany	1988–2011	Schalke 04, Arsenal	2	First ever goal keeper to score in open play in the Bundesliga
Archie Ling	England	1900–1913	Brentford	2	
**Adrian Lis**	Poland	2009–	Polonia Środa Wielkopolska, Warta Poznań	2	A free-kick from his own half against Warta Poznań in 2015 and a last-minute header against Górnik Łęczna in 2021.
**Juan Camilo Martínez**	Colombia	2017–	Orsomarso	2	Both goals scored from free kicks
**Mauro Iguatu**	Brazil	2010–	Campinense	2	Both penalties. First against Sousa at 2022 Copa do Nordeste, second against Atlético Cerarense at 2022 Campeonato Brasileiro Série C.
**Abdullah Al-Mayouf**	Saudi Arabia	2004–	Al-Ahli, Al-Hilal	2	Both penalties
Willie McIver	England	1897–1919	Brentford	2	
Óscar Mejía	Dominican Republic	1999–2010	Dominican Republic	2	Scored twice playing as striker in Gold Cup 2003 qualifying
Imran Mohamed	Maldives	1999–2019	New Radiant, VB Sports Club	2	
Campbell Money	Scotland	1981–1996	St Mirren	2	
Isidro Montserrat	Spain	1933	Unión Española	2	Both penalties.
**Fernando Muslera**	Uruguay	2004–	Galatasaray	2	Penalty scored against Manisaspor in 2012 and against Kayserispor in 2025.
Perlat Musta	Albania	1979–1996	Partizani Tirana	2	
**Mbongeni Mzimela**	South Africa	2009–	Platinum Stars	2	Both penalties against Vipers SC, March 18, at the 2017 CAF Confederation Cup.
Zoran Nikitović	Yugoslavia	1974–1989	Footscray JUST	2	
Andrei Novosadov	Soviet Union; Russia	1989–2006	Torpedo Moscow	2	Both penalties
Tome Pachovski	Macedonia	1999–2017	Vardar	2	
**Hannington Ssebwalunyo**	Uganda	20xx–	NEC	2	
Subrata Pal	India	2004–2022	Pune	2	I-League
**Daniel Peretz**	Israel	2019–	Beitar Tel Aviv Bat Yam	2	Scored two penalties in the Liga Leumit at the 2019–20 season.
Toni Prats	Spain	1991–2008	Real Betis	2	
Petre Rădulescu	Romania	1932–1936	Unirea Tricolor București	2	
Mehdi Rahmati	Iran	2000–2020	Fajr Sepasi Shiraz F.C., Paykan F.C.	2	
**Ricardo**	Portugal	2001–	Varzim	2	Both goals scored from goal kicks
Donovan Ricketts	Jamaica	2002–2017	Village United	2	
Paul Robinson	England	1998–2017	Leeds United, Tottenham Hotspur	2	Header for Leeds from a corner, free kick for Tottenham Hotspur from inside his own half.
**German Salort**	Argentina	2013–	Agropecuario	2	
Amer Shafi	Jordan	1999–2021	Jordan, Al-Wehdat	2	
Giorgos Sidiropoulos	Greece	1972–1973	Trikala F.C.	2	Penalty kicks. Against Panathinaikos in 1972 and against Panionios in 1973.
Krzysztof Słabik	Poland	1970–1986	Lechia Gdańsk	2	Penalties against Warta Poznań and Olimpia Poznań.
Tomasz Stefaniszyn	Poland	1945–1965	Garbarnia Kraków	2	Penalties in 1950
Alex Stepney	England	1961–1982	Manchester United	2	
Slavko Stojanović	Yugoslavia	1945–1969	Partizan, Wormatia Worms	2	
**August Strömberg**	Sweden	2009–	Varberg, Kongsvinger	2	
Oleh Suslov	Soviet Union; Ukraine	1986–2002	Chornomorets Odesa	2	Both penalties
Andriy Tovt	Ukraine	2003–2013	Obolon Kyiv	2	
Tonny van Leeuwen	Netherlands	1959–1971	GVAV Rapiditas	2	Both penalties
**Iván Vázquez**	Mexico	2002–	Necaxa	2	Goals scored from free kicks
**Benji Villalobos**	El Salvador	2004–	Águila	2	
**Warlei**	Brazil	2019–	Manthiqueira, Arauco Prado	2	Penalty kick scored against Paulista, 9 July 2022, at the Campeonato Paulista Segunda Divisão. and in 2023 Copa Simón Bolívar.
Michał Wróbel	Poland	1998–2018	Olimpia Grudziądz	2	
**Dashamir Xhika**	Albania	2006–	Besëlidhja Lezhë	2	Both penalties
Mabrouk Zaid	Saudi Arabia	1998–2014	Al-Ittihad	2	Both penalties
Ahmad Reza Abedzadeh	Iran	1985–2001	Persepolis	2	
**Ivan Provedel**	Italy	2013–	Juve Stabia, Lazio	2	Scored two last-minute goals (both is draw equaliser at minute 90+5' injury time). First goal, at Serie B match against Ascoli in 2020, ending the game 2–2. Second goal with a header, at UEFA Champions League group stage match against Atlético Madrid in 2023, ending the game 1–1.
Aaron Lawrence	Jamaica	1997–2005	Jamaica, Reno	2	Penalty in a 3–0 win against India in 2002, and a goal in the Jamaica Premier League during the 2002–03 season.
Mohamed Zemmamouche	Algeria	2004–2025	MC Alger, USM Alger	2	One in the Algerian Cup, and one in the CAF Confederations Cup; both penalty kicks.
**Jorge Iván Soto**	Colombia	2013–	Águilas Doradas	2	
Tsang Man Fai	Hong Kong	2009–2021	Fourway Rangers	1	Scored a goal and had an assist in his professional debut in the league
Waheed Abood	Iraq		Al-Ramadi	1	He scored at least one penalty kick.
Patricio Abraham	Argentina	2004–2019	San Telmo	1	Scored a last-minute winning goal from a header, which turned out to be crucial in his side avoiding relegation
**Carlos Acevedo**	Mexico	2016–	Santos Laguna	1	Scored one goal on Matchday 14 on the last minute vs. Querétaro.
Acurcio	Portugal	1955–1961	Porto	1	
**Denis Adamov**	Russia	2016–	FC Krasnodar-3	1	Injury time header against FC Inter Cherkessk, 4 October 2019, at Russian Football National League 2.
**Ali Adams**	Scotland	2018–	Arbroath	1	
Ado	Brazil	1964–1981	Bragantino	1	Scored from his own area against Palmeiras (São João da Boa Vista), at Campeonato Paulista Série A2.
Adriano Paredão	Brazil	2002–2017	Remo	1	Scored against Tiradentes, at 2008 Campeonato Paraense.
**Ali Ahamada**	Comoros	2010–	Toulouse	1	Equalized with a header in the 95th minute against Rennes on 22 September 2012
Nihat Akbay	Turkey	1961–1978	Beykoz	1	
**Mohammad Reza Akhbari**	Iran	2010–	Iran U-23	1	
Juan Carlos Alfaro	Costa Rica		Municipal Puntarenas	1	Scored from a free kick
**Alisson**	Brazil	2013–	Liverpool	1	Scored a last-minute winning goal from a header against West Bromwich Albion in a 2020–21 Premier League match
Ever Almeida	Paraguay	1967–1991	Olimpia	1	
Eduardo Alterio	Argentina	?–1931–?	Chacarita Juniors	1	Scored a penalty in 1931, with no opposition from the other goalkeeper; the first goalkeeper goal in professional football in Argentina
**Cristian Álvarez**	Argentina	2005–	Zaragoza	1	Scored an equaliser in the 97th minute of a 2–2 away draw with Lugo
**Minor Álvarez**	Costa Rica	2010–	Escazuceña	1	Scored from a free kick on 3 June 2020, to equalize for Escazuceña in their Segunda División de Costa Rica playoff match against Consultants Moravia. His side would go on to win the match on penalties.
Marco Amelia	Italy	2001–2017	Livorno	1	His goal came in Belgrade, Serbia and would prove to be crucial as Livorno made its first ever trip in European competition. Livorno would go to reach the Round of 32 at the 2006–07 UEFA Cup.
Anselmo	Brazil	1988–2000	Ceará	1	Penalty kick scored against Desportiva, at 1995 Campeonato Brasileiro Série B.
Justin Apostol	Romania	1933–1944	Gloria CFR Galați	1	
Dani Aranzubia	Spain	1996–2015	Deportivo La Coruña	1	Scored with his head from a 95th minute corner kick, as his team managed a 1–1 draw at Almería on 20 February 2011
**Ignacio Arce**	Argentina	2010–	San Martín de Tucumán	1	Injury time header against Instituto de Córdoba, 24 November 2019, at the 2019–20 Primera Nacional.
**Arthur Augusto**	Brazil	2018–	Feirense	1	Scored from a free kick from his own half, against Moreirense, 19 October 2022, at 2022–23 Liga Portugal 2.
Arthur Pedro	Brazil	2008–2023	Resende	1	Injury time header against Madureira, 30 November 2014, at 2014 Copa Rio final.
Mattias Asper	Sweden	1993–2015	Mjällby AIF	1	Scored a header from a 93rd minute free kick, as his team managed a 2–2 draw at Häcken on 15 September 2010
Elias Atmatsidis	Greece	1989–2005	AEK Athens	1	Penalty
Osvaldo Ayala	Colombia		Independiente Medellín	1	
Gábor Babos	Hungary	1995–2000	MTK	1	Penalty
Mateusz Bąk	Poland	2000–2017	Lechia Gdańsk	1	Penalty in stoppage time, scoring the last goal of a 15–0 win.
Edvan Bakaj	Albania	2004–2023	Laçi	1	Scored a penalty in a league match against Kastrioti Krujë on 5 May 2014.
Benjamin Howard Baker	England	1913–1929	Chelsea	1	
**Göktuğ Bakırbaş**	Turkey	2016–	Manisaspor	1	Scored a game-tying goal in the 90th minute against Denizlispor, 3 March 2018, at the TFF First League.
Morten Bakke	Norway		Molde	1	League goal in 2000.
Manuel Balbuena	Spain	1905–1907	Huelva Recreation Club	1	He scored the goal to reduce the deficit against Real Madrid (Madrid FC at that time) in the 1907 Copa del Rey after dribbling past the players and scoring the goal.
**Tolo Barceló**	Spain	2013–	Alcúdia	1	Scored a last-minute equalizer with an overhead kick.
**Omar Bari**	Qatar	2007–	Al Rayyan	1	Scored in the 93rd minute in Qatar Stars League to equalize against Al Sadd in the 2013–14 league season.
Scott Barrett	England	1983–2005	Colchester United	1	Scored a goal for Colchester United which proved crucial in their battle with Wycombe Wanderers for the 1991/92 GM Vauxhall Conference title. He booted a long range goal kick which looped over Wycombe goalkeeper Paul Hyde and into his goal.
Boubacar Barry	Ivory Coast	1999–2019	Lokeren	1	
**Eduard Baychora**	Russia	2009–	Dynamo Stavropol	1	Scored a late equalizer, 31 March 2018, against FC Afips Afipsky, at the Russian PFL.
Ashley Bayes	England	1990–2015	Grays Athletic	1	Scored against Havant & Waterlooville, April 2005, in the club's final league game of the season.
**Asmir Begović**	Bosnia and Herzegovina	2005–	Stoke City	1	His 91.9-meter-long clearance bounced over the opponent's goalkeeper (Artur Boruc). Fastest goal by a goalkeeper, at thirteen seconds.
**Carlos Bejarano**	Equatorial Guinea	2007–	Árabe Unido	1	
Ivan Benito	Switzerland	1996–2014	Aarau	1	Scored against Young Boys, 24 October 2008, at the 2008–09 Swiss Super League.
Arjan Beqaj	Albania	1992–2011	OFI Crete	1	First goalkeeper to score with header in the Super League Greece (11 February 2001, OFI – Paniliakos 2–2)
Roger Berbig	Switzerland	1971–1984	Grasshopper	1	
Ezequiel Berdín	Argentina		Atenas de Río Cuarto	1	
Alija Bešić	Luxembourg	1994–2004	Union Luxembourg	1	
**Anthony Beuve**	France	2007–	US Avranches	1	Injury time header against GOAL FC on 29 September 2023, valid for the 2023–24 Championnat National.
**Bella Bixby**	United States	2018–	Portland Thorns	1	Portland Thorns were down a goal in stoppage time of their NWSL league match against Angel City FC on 29 April 2023. Bixby equalized with a back heel, when the opposing keeper did not fully capture.
Michelle Betos	United States	2013–2025	Portland Thorns	1	Portland Thorns were down a player and down a goal in stoppage time of their NWSL league match against FC Kansas City on 19 June 2015. Unmarked on a corner kick, Betos equalized by scoring a diving header.
Billy Biggar	England	1899–1920	Watford	1	Penalty kick scored against Coventry City, 20 February 1909, at the Southern Football League.
Ian Black	Scotland	1944–1964	Fulham	1	
**Armend Blakçori**	Kosovo		Ulpiana	1	Scored a penalty in a 2020–21 Kosovar Cup round of 16 match against Liria
**Arnaud Bodart**	Belgium	2017–	Standard Liège	1	Injury time goal against K.A.S. Eupen, 21 November 2020, at 2020–21 Belgian First Division A.
**Ruud Boffin**	Belgium	2007–	Eskişehirspor	1	Scored from a direct free kick from his own half
**Sinan Bolat**	Turkey	2005–	Standard Liège	1	His goal saved Standard Liege from being eliminated from European football altogether and in the process eliminated Dutch champions AZ Alkmaar.
Roberto Bonano	Argentina	1991–2008	River Plate	1	
Steve Book	England	1988–2012	Mangotsfield United	1	
**Milan Borjan**	Canada	2008–	Red Star Belgrade	1	Scored a penalty kick for 3–1 win against Voždovac in the final game of 2021–22 Serbian SuperLiga season.
René Borkovic	Switzerland		Switzerland U-17	1	Borkovic scored the only goal of the match three minutes into stoppage time to give Switzerland its first UEFA U-17 berth since 2005.
Oliver Thorup Børner	Denmark	2019–	Akademisk Boldklub	1	Long range free kick
Yevhen Borovyk	Ukraine	2003–2019	Kryvbas Kryvyi Rih	1	Scored at last minute of game against Arsenal Kyiv after corner kick
Artur Boruc	Poland	1998–2022	Legia Warsaw	1	Penalty against Widzew Łódź
Mark Bosnich	Australia	1989–2009	Australia	1	Scored penalty for Australia in a 13–0 win over the Solomon Islands with the last kick of the game.
Carlos Bossio	Argentina	1993–2013	Estudiantes La Plata	1	
Bertrand Bossu	France	1999–2016	Hayes	1	Injury time scoring against Boston United, 2 December 2000, at the 2000–01 Football Conference.
**Sarah Bouhaddi**	France	2003–	Lyon	1	Penalty scored in a 14–0 home victory against Albi.
**Yassine Bounou**	Morocco	2010–	Sevilla	1	Scored an equalizer in the 94th minute of a 1–1 away draw with Valladolid
Arthur Bown (goalkeeper)	England		Halifax Town	1	
Arthur Box	England	1903–1911?	Burslem Port Vale	1	
Darko Božović	Serbia and Montenegro; Montenegro	1996–2015	Bežanija	1	An injury-time equalizing header in a league game against Voždovac
Jochen Bradt	Belgium		J.V. De Pinte	1	
**James Bransgrove**	Scotland	2012–	Walthamstow	1	
**Claudio Bravo**	Chile	2002–	Real Sociedad	1	Scored from a free kick
**Declan Breen**	Northern Ireland	2021–	Ballyclare Comrades	1	Scored from his own box in a 6-3 win over Ards in the NIFL Championship in October 2023.
**Alberto Brignoli**	Italy	2009–	Benevento	1	Scored a second-half stoppage time equalizer against Milan to earn Benevento their first ever Serie A point
**Jorge Broun**	Argentina	2005–	Rosario Central	1	Penalty kick scored against Independiente, 23 October 2009, at the Argentine Primera División.
Adin Brown	United States	2000–2011	Aalesunds FK	1	Scored from a throw-in during extra time
Osmar Brunelli	Argentina; Paraguay	1981–1997	Fernández Vial	1	
Aleksandr Budakov	Russia	2002–2019	Kuban Krasnodar	1	
**Fabijan Buntić**	Croatia	2016–	FC Ingolstadt	1	Scored a volley from a corner in second-half stoppage time to equalize for Ingolstadt in a German 3. Liga match; they would go on to score a winner a minute later
Dieter Burdenski	West Germany; Germany	1969–1991	Werder Bremen	1	Penalty
Erich Burgener	Switzerland	1969–1987	Lausanne	1	
**Jack Bycroft**	England	2020–	Exeter City	1	Scored a headed goal for Exeter City in the sixth minute of injury time in a 3–3 draw with Stockport County.
Rodrigo Calchi	Brazil	2005–2022	Jabaquara	1	Penalty kick scored against Portuguesa Santista, 2 June 2013, at the Campeonato Paulista Segunda Divisão.
Tudorel Călugăru	Romania	1976–1994	Oțelul Galați	1	Scored a penalty against CF Brăila in 1992
Rafael Cammarota	Brazil	1974–1995	Coritiba	1	Penalty kick scored against Operário Ferroviário, 30 August 1992, at Campeonato Paranaense.
**Leandro Cañete**	Chile	2013-	Deportes Recoleta	1	Penalty kick scored against Deportes Iberia, 21 July 2018, at Segunda División.
Frank Carrillo	Costa Rica		San Carlos	1	Penalty
**Eloy Casals**	Spain	2014–	Santa Coloma	1	With his club trailing 3–2 on aggregate in the first qualifying round of the UEFA Champions League, Casals scored four minutes into stoppage time to send FC Santa Coloma into the next round by virtue of away goals.
Ray Cashley	England	1970–1986?	Bristol City	1	
Bram Castro	Belgium	2000–2022	Roda JC	1	Scored the equalizer (2–2) in the dying seconds of the KNVB Cup 2007-08 third round tie against De Graafschap.
Bob Catlin	Australia	1984–2004	APIA Leichhardt	1	
Sebastián Cejas	Argentina	1994–2011	Ascoli	1	Penalty kick scored against Catania, 5 April 2003, at the 2002–03 Serie B.
Víctor Centurión	Paraguay	2005–2021	Guaraní	1	
Danny Cepero	United States	2007–2010	New York Red Bulls	1	First MLS goalkeeper to score a goal. His goal also came on the same day he made his Red Bulls debut, as first choice goalkeeper Jon Conway would serve a 10-game suspension for using illegal substances. The goal came at Giants Stadium in East Rutherford, New Jersey and the goal would eventually help the Red Bulls secure the last playoff spot in 2008 and reach the 2008 MLS Cup.
Radek Černý	Czech Republic	1995–2014	Slavia Prague	1	Scored the last goal in a 4–0 victory against FK Jablonec in a 1999–2000 season league match.
Rachad Chitou	Benin	2002–2011	Benin	1	Scored against Sierra Leone, 10 August 2006, at the 2008 Africa Cup of Nations qualification.
Choi Eun-sung	South Korea	1997–2014	Daejeon Citizen	1	Free kick. Scored in the AFC Champions League
Reginald Cini	Malta	1988–2003	Valletta	1	Penalty scored on 28 March 1998 against Tarxien Rainbows.
**Brendan Clarke**	Republic of Ireland	2003–	St Patrick's Athletic	1	
**Cleiton**	Brazil	2016–	Red Bull Bragantino	1	Penalty kick against Grêmio Novorizontino, on 15 February 2026, valid for 2026 Campeonato Paulista.
Marc de Clerck	Belgium	1970–1983	Aberdeen	1	
David Cobeño	Spain	2000–2016	Rayo Vallecano	1	
Fabio Coltorti	Switzerland	1999–2018	RB Leipzig	1	Scored a goal in the 90th minute in a 2–1 home victory over SV Darmstadt 98.
Jesús Contreras	Mexico		Monterrey	1	
**Jo Coppens**	Belgium	2008–	Carl Zeiss Jena	1	Kick off hit from a distance of 85 meters in a 3. Liga match in 2017
**Lucas Covolan**	Brazil	2012–	Torquay United	1	Injury time header against Hartlepool United in 2021 National League play-off final.
Julio Cozzi	Argentina	1941–1961	Millonarios	1	
David Crawford	Scotland	2003–2017	Arbroath	1	
Aurel Crâsnic	Romania	1950–1962	Jiul Petroșani	1	
Anghel Crețeanu	Romania	1933–1937	Juventus București	1	
**Crismerio**	Brazil	2009–	Pacajus	1	Injury time header against Icasa, 23 February 2021, at Campeonato Cearense.
**Hernán Cristante**	Argentina	1993–2012	Deporvito Toluca F.C.	1	Scored in the 54th minute from a penalty kick
**Mads Christiansen**	Norway	2019–	Lillestrøm SK	1	Injury time goal against Tromsø IL, 7 August 2022, in the 2022 Eliteserien. Equalising for the team.
Mark Crossley	Wales	1989–2013	Sheffield Wednesday	1	
José Fernando Cuadrado	Colombia	2005–2021	Deportivo Pasto	1	
**Erik Cummins**	Netherlands	2014–	Go Ahead Eagles	1	
Goran Ćurko	Yugoslavia; Serbia and Montenegro; Serbia	1989–2010	ČSK Čelarevo	1	
**Ognjen Čančarević**	Armenia	2006–	Noah	1	Scored from a goal kick against AEK Athens in the third qualifying round of 2024–25 UEFA Conference League.
**Finn Dahmen**	Germany	1994–2011	Mainz 05 II	1	On 11 April 2018, scored in the second minute of second-half stoppage time against VfB Stuttgart II to secure a 1–1 draw, having scored with a backheel after coming forward for a Mainz free kick.
Yevhen Deineko	Ukraine	2002–2015	Dnipro Cherkasy	1	Scored goal from a distance of 80 metres inside his own penalty area.
Jaime Deluque	Colombia		Unión Magdalena	1	
Wim de Ron	Netherlands		Cambuur	1	Penalty
Oswaldo De Vecchi	Brazil	1924–1939	Vitória	1	Penalty kick scored at 1926 Campeonato Baiano. First Brazilian-born goalkeeper to score a goal.
**Lassana Diabaté**	France	2022–	Bordeaux	1	Injury time equalizer goal against Poitiers, valid for the 2024–25 Championnat National 2.
**Marko Dmitrović**	Serbia	2010–	Eibar	1	Scored a first half penalty against Atlético Madrid in a 2020–21 La Liga match
Niko Dovana	Albania	1930–194?	Teuta Durrës	1	
Harry Dowd	England	1961–1974	Manchester City	1	
Helmut Duckadam	Romania	1982–1986	Steaua București	1	Penalty kick against AFC Progresul București in the Cupa României.
Rein van Duijnhoven	Netherlands	1987–2006	MVV	1	Goal kick. Helped by the wind, the ball bounced over the outcoming opposite goalkeeper Jan van Grinsven of FC Den Bosch, a goalscorer once himself.
**William Dutoit**	France	2010–	Sint-Truiden	1	Scored a goal against Lokeren in November 2015.
Aleksander Dziurowicz	Poland	1945–1963	Zagłębie Sosnowiec	1	Penalty
Edinho	Brazil	2000–2013	Anapolina	1	Injury time header against Tupi, 28 August 2011, at the Campeonato Brasileiro Série D.
**Gabino Espinoza**	Mexico	2007–	Cimarrones de Sonora	1	Injury time header against Pumas Tabasco, 22 March 2022, at the Liga de Expansión MX.
**Evandro Gigante**	Brazil	2010–	Rio Branco	1	Injury time header against Amazonas, 21 May 2022, at the Campeonato Brasileiro Série D.
Eliandro	Brazil	2004-2014	ACB Estância Velha	1	Scored a header from a free kick in a 1-0 win against Cerâmica Atlético Clube in Copa Metropolitana
Fabrício	Brazil	1999–2015	Castanhal	1	Penalty kick scored against Tuna Luso, 29 August 2004, at the Campeonato Brasileiro Série C.
Khaled Al Fadhli	Kuwait	1991–2012	Kuwait SC	1	Scored in the 94th minute with a header to equalize against Al Salmiya in the 2005–06 league season.
Papa Fall	Guinea-Bissau	2008–2015	Union Meppen	1	
**Wuilker Faríñez**	Venezuela	2014–	Venezuela U-20	1	Penalty at 2017 FIFA U-20 World Cup
George Farm	Scotland	1947–1964	Blackpool	1	
**Alioune Badara Faty**	Senegal	2019–	TP Mazembe	1	Scored a penalty in his team's 3–1 loss against Young Africans in the 2024–25 CAF Champions League.
Khadim Faye	Senegal	1991–2007	Felgueiras	1	
Jonnie Fedel	Sweden	1986–2006	Malmö FF	1	
Adam Federici	Australia	2003–2021	Reading	1	
Alvin Felix	Grenada		Grenada	1	Scored against Saint Vincent and the Grenadines, 18 March 2001, in a friendly match.
Ahmed Fellah	Algeria	2005–2016	CR Belouizdad	1	
Gabard Fénélon	Haiti	2002–2022	Montréal-Nord	1	
Fernando Leal	Brazil	2000–2018	Oeste	1	Injury time header against Avaí, 24 May 2013, at Campeonato Brasileiro Série B.
Tó Ferreira	Portugal	1990–2012	Amora	1	
Aleksandr Filimonov	Soviet Union; Russia	1990–2018	Druzhba Yoshkar-Ola	1	
Andreas Filotas	Cyprus	1960–1975	Olympiakos Nicosia	1	On 28 January 1968 he scored a penalty against Panserraikos. This was the first ever goal scored by a goalkeeper in Greek football.
**Mark Flekken**	Netherlands	2016–	MSV Duisburg	1	Scored a backheel goal for Duisburg in injury time in a 1–1 draw with VfL Osnabrück.
**Scott Flinders**	England	2004–	Hartlepool United	1	Scored a headed goal for Hartlepool in the third minute of injury time in a 2–2 draw with Bournemouth.
Khalid Fouhami	Morocco	1991–2010	Dinamo București	1	Penalty
Daniel Francovig	Uruguay		Deportivo Táchira	1	
Alfredo Frausto	Mexico	2003–2016	Dorados de Sinaloa	1	Equalized in the 90th minute of the Apertura 2012 Copa MX Final against Correcaminos UAT, taking the match to a penalty shoot-out, where Frausto also scored the decisive penalty, and thus won Dorados their first title.
**Žiga Frelih**	Slovenia	2015–	Inter Zaprešić	1	Scored in a 2–2 draw with Istra, on 4 October 2019, in the 92nd minute of the game.
Brad Friedel	United States	1994–2015	Blackburn Rovers	1	Equalised for Blackburn Rovers in the 90th minute of a Premier League match against Charlton Athletic on a corner kick to bring the score to 2-2, but allowed Charlton to score the winning goal in stoppage time.
Henning Friise	Norway	1983–1998	Mjøndalen	1	Converted a penalty kick in the last round of the 1992 Eliteserien. Stood as the last Mjøndalen goal in the Eliteserien until 2015.
Gabriel Eremith	Brazil	2015–2022	Vasco do Acre	1	Free kick scored against Andirá, 28 August 2021, at Campeonato Acreano.
**Gabriel Leite**	Brazil	2006–	Luverdense	1	Penalty kick scored against Rio Branco, 3 July 2013, at Campeonato Brasileiro Série C.
**Riccardo Gagno**	Italy	2013–	Modena	1	During injury time, scored from his own area against Imolese, at the 2021–22 Serie C
Sergio Galarza	Bolivia	1997–2014	Guabirá	1	
**Hernán Galíndez**	Ecuador	2008–	Universidad Católica	1	Penalty kick scored against C.D. Clan Juvenil, 29 October 2017, at the 2017 Ecuadorian Serie A.
Ivko Ganchev	Bulgaria	1984–2000	Bursaspor	1	
**Alejandro García**	Spain	2001–	Llanera	1	Injury time equalizer goal against CD Tuilla, 31 August 2018, at the 2018–19 Tercera División.
José Ignacio Garmendia	Spain	1979–1998	Eibar	1	Scored from his own area against Pontevedra CF, 17 April 1988, at the 1987–88 Segunda División B.
**Luka Gavran**	Canada	2019–	Toronto FC	1	Scored a header in extra time to tie the game against Philadelphia Union in a 2026 Major League Soccer match.
**Gecivagner**	Brazil	2011–	CTE Colatina	1	Injury time header against Pinheiros, 4 October 2021, at the Copa ES.
**Piotr Gembara**	Poland		Słowianin Wolibórz	1	Scored from his own area against Miedź Legnica II in the III liga, group III on 15 August 2025.
Jordan Georgievski	Macedonia	2003–2013	Teteks Tetovo	1	Penalty
**Rafał Gikiewicz**	Poland	2004–	Union Berlin	1	Headed stoppage time equalizer against 1. FC Heidenheim. Union Berlin went on to qualify for the 2019–20 Bundesliga via the promotion play-off ahead of Hamburger SV by a single point.
Thomas Gill	Norway	1983–2005	MSV Duisburg	1	Penalty kick goal scored against Dynamo Moscow, 30 July 1997, at the UEFA Intertoto Cup.
Jimmy Glass	England	1991–2001	Carlisle United	1	Famous for scoring a last-minute goal to save Carlisle United from relegation from the Football League
Matt Glennon	England	1997–2017	St Johnstone	1	Came up for corner late in the game to equalise in a 2-2 draw at Ross County in March 2006
Ray Goddard	England	1967–1981	Greenock Morton	1	
Goico	Brazil	1997–2016	Inter de Santa Maria	1	Injury time bicycle kick against Engenheiro Beltrão, 17 August 2008, at Campeonato Brasileiro Série C.
**Ivo Gonçalves**	Portugal	2002–	Penafiel	1	Scored from his own area against Santa Clara, 6 December 2015, at the 2015–16 LigaPro.
Alejandro González Rojas	Costa Rica	1975–1990	Alajuelense	1	Penalty
**Julio González**	Mexico	2008–	Pumas UNAM	1	
**Román González**	Costa Rica		Ramonense	1	
Andy Goram	Scotland	1981–2004	Hibernian	1	
Branko Grahovac	Serbia and Montenegro; Serbia	2000–2017	Borac Čačak	1	
**Morten Grasmo**	Norway	2018–	Sotra	1	Injury time bicycle kick against Ullern IF, 26 June 2022, at 2022 Norwegian Second Division.
Matt Gregg	England	1995–2011	University College Dublin	1	
Attilio Gregori	Italy	1983–2003	Lodigiani	1	Penalty kick against Frosinone, on 24 November 2002.
Fred Grim	Netherlands	1986–2002	Cambuur	1	
Jan van Grinsven	Netherlands	1981–1999	Den Bosch	1	Scored a legendary late equalising goal against Roda JC in 1985.
Bruce Grobbelaar	Rhodesia; Zimbabwe	1973–2007	Crewe Alexandra	1	Penalty against York City in Grobbelaar's final game for Crewe.
Frode Grodås	Norway		Lillestrøm	1	League goal in 1991.
Volkmar Groß	West Germany	1967–1983	Tennis Borussia Berlin	1	Penalty
Gunnleifur Gunnleifsson	Iceland	1995–2020	HK Kópavogs	1	
**Nahuel Guzmán**	Argentina	2005–	Tigres UANL	1	In 2020, Guzmán scored an injury time header from a set piece in Tigres' CONCACAF Champions League round of 16 match against Alianza, putting his team into a 4–2 lead at home and allowing them to advance to the quarter-finals. Tigres had lost 2–1 in the away leg and would have been eliminated on away goals if not for Guzmán's goal. They went on to win the tournament.
Tally Hall	United States	2006–2016	Houston Dynamo	1	Scored in 2009–10 CONCACAF Champions League match against Isidro Metapán on 23 October 2009.
**Martin Hansen**	Denmark	2010–	ADO Den Haag	1	Backheel goal in stoppage time against PSV Eindhoven to earn his team a draw (2–2).
Pär Hansson	Sweden	2005–2019	Helsingborg	1	Penalty in 9–0 victory over Askeröds IF.
Pat Harrington	Canada	1985–2000	Buffalo Blizzard	1	
Kay Hawke	England	2000–2012	Lincoln Ladies	1	
**Lajos Hegedűs**	Hungary	2006–	Puskás Akadémia	1	
Henal	Brazil	2011–2023	Cuiabá	1	During injury time, after miss a header, scored in the rebound against América de Natal, at 2016 Campeonato Brasileiro Série C.
Dennis Herod	England	1940–1954	Stoke City	1	In an away match at Aston Villa on 16 February 1952, Herod broke his arm and spent the rest of the match at right wing with Stoke defending a 2–1 lead. Not considered a threat by Villa's defence, Herod was left unmarked and found himself one on one with keeper Con Martin before slotting the ball past him.
Iain Hesford	England	1977–1998	Maidstone United	1	
William Hesmer	United States	2004–2012	Columbus Crew	1	Came forward and scored in second half stoppage time to help Columbus draw 2–2 against rivals Toronto FC
**Guido Herrera**	Argentina	2012–	Talleres	1	Penalty kick scored against Olimpo, 12 May 2018, at the 2017–18 Argentine Primera División.
**Iago Herrerín**	Spain	2006–	Atlético Madrid B	1	Scored the winning goal in a 3–2 victory for his team against Getafe B on 8 January 2011
Heverton Perereca	Brazil	1997–2018	Vila Aurora	1	Free kick scored against Cuiabá on 28 August 2011, valid for the 2011 Campeonato Brasileiro Série D
**Mateusz Hewelt**	Poland	2016–	Miedź Legnica	1	Scored a last-minute equalizer in a I liga match against Chrobry Głogów on 3 October 2020.
**Marwin Hitz**	Switzerland	2005–	FC Augsburg	1	Scored a stoppage time equalizer in a league match against Bayer Leverkusen on 21 February 2015 (2–2).
Hossein Hosseini	Iran	2011–	Esteghlal FC	1	Iran Pro league 2022–23
**Albertini Holness**	Cayman Islands	2018–	Cayman Islands U-20	1	Penalty
Erik Holtan	Norway		Moss	1	League goal in 2006.
Karel Hobšil	Czech Republic	1955–1959	Baník Ostrava	1	
Sosha Makani	Iran	2006–2020	Fajr Sepasi Shiraz F.C.	1	Iran Pro league 2007–08
Darko Horvat	Croatia	1994–2013	Hallescher FC	1	
Tim Howard	United States	1997–2020	Everton	1	Scored a goal from open play inside own penalty box against Bolton Wanderers, helped by a strong gust of wind, making Howard only the fourth keeper since the Premier League's 1992 inception to score a goal.
Huanderson	Brazil	2002–2023	São Bernardo FC	1	Penalty kick scored against São José, 8 April 2006, at Campeonato Paulista Série A3
Guy Hubart	Belgium	1979–1997	Estrela da Amadora	1	On 29 December 1994, scored an equalizer goal in a league match against GD Chaves.
Lassi Hurskainen	Finland	2006–2012?	Soccer Club Riverball	1	
Wilhelm Huxhorn	West Germany; Germany	1984–1992	SV Darmstadt 98	1	Kick off hit from a distance of 103 meters (world record) in a 2. Bundesliga match in 1985
Claudio Ibarra	Paraguay		Once Caldas	1	
**Clint Irwin**	United States	2008–	Capital City	1	
Jaguaré	Brazil	1928–1940	Olympique de Marseille	1	Penalty kick scored against Sète, 1 May 1938, at 1937–38 French Division 1
**Pete Jameson**	England	2013–	Gateshead	1	Scored from his penalty area against his former club Harrogate Town in a National League match on 31 August 2026.
**Eldin Jakupović**	Switzerland	2004–	Grasshopper	1	
**Ivan Janjušević**	Serbia and Montenegro; Montenegro	2004–	Sutjeska Nikšić	1	
Ahmed Jassem	Kuwait	1992–2006	Kuwait	1	Scored a late penalty in a 20-0 win in a 2000 Asian Cup qualifying match against Bhutan, and was the first Kuwaiti goalkeeper to score in an international competition
Pat Jennings	Northern Ireland	1963–1986	Tottenham Hotspur	1	Against Manchester United in the 1967 FA Charity Shield.
**Jhonatan**	Brazil	2010–	Operário Ferroviário	1	Scored from his own area against Nacional de Rolândia, 9 March 2015, at Campeonato Paranaense.
Bojan Jorgačević	Serbia and Montenegro; Serbia	2002–2017	Gent	1	
**Jesse Joronen**	Finland	2009–	Stevenage	1	Long-range clearance against Wycombe Wanderers in the League Two match.
John Joyce	England	1896–1920	Tottenham Hotspur	1	Penalty
**Juan Carlos**	Spain	2005–	Lugo	1	Scored from 65 metres against Sporting Gijón
**Jung Sung-ryong**	South Korea	2003–	South Korea U-23	1	Scored from 85 metres against Ivory Coast
Norbert Juračka	Czechoslovakia; Slovakia	1988–2000	Dukla Banská Bystrica	1	
**Wiktor Kaczorowski**	Poland	2018–	Rekord Bielsko-Biała	1	Scored a stoppage time equalizing header in a 2–2 league draw against KKS 1925 Kalisz on 8 September 2024.
Vitaliy Kafanov	Soviet Union; Kazakhstan; Turkmenistan	1980–1996	FK Köpetdag Aşgabat	1	
Dawood Al Kahali	Oman		Sohar	1	Scored a goal from open play inside his own penalty area against Saham, helped by a strong gust of wind. Scored in a round of 32 match in the Sultan Qaboos Cup during the 2018–19 season.
Eugène Kalbermatten	Switzerland	1935–1947	Cantonal Neuchatel	1	
**Zachary Kane**	United States	2013–	Baltimore Bohemians	1	Scored the match winner against Ocean City Nor'easters on 21 July 2013
Xhevahir Kapllani	Albania	1991–2008	Teuta Durrës	1	
Alexandros Kasmeridis	Greece	2006–	Asteras Magoula	1	Last minute header goal against Levadiakos in a Greek Football Cup match.
Kjell Kaspersen	Norway		Norway	1	Penalty kick against Thailand on 19 May 1965. Kaspersen became the first and so far only goalkeeper to score for Norway men's national team.
Hamdi Kasraoui	Tunisia	2002–2018	Espérance de Tunis	1	
Peter Keen	England	1995–2009	Carlisle United	1	
Marián Kelemen	Slovakia	1999–2019	Śląsk Wrocław	1	Scored the final goal for Śląsk Wrocław in the last round of the Polish Ekstraklasa from the penalty spot, securing the runner-up position for the club for the 2010–11 season.
Charlie Kelly	Scotland		East Stirlingshire	1	
Josh Keeley	Ireland	2022–	Leyton Orient	1	The first ever goalkeeper to score for The O’s.
Sattar Khalaf	Iraq		Iraq	1	He scored a penalty kick in the 1972 AFC Asian Cup qualification.
Mohammed Al-Khojali	Saudi Arabia	1998–2015	Al Nassr	1	
**Tom King**	Wales	2014–	Newport County	1	Scored from a goal kick against Cheltenham Town on 19 January 2021, breaking the world record for longest goal scored in a competitive football match at 96.01 metres (105 yards)
Richard Kingson	Ghana	1995–2015	Ghana	1	
Neal Kitson	United States	2008–2013	Rochester Rhinos	1	Scored a 90th-minute equalizer goal in a 2–2 tie with Antigua Barracuda FC on June 5, 2011.
**Vedran Kjosevski**	Bosnia and Herzegovina	2013–	Željezničar	1	
**Gabriel Kobylak**	Poland	2018–	Radomiak Radom	1	Scored an equalizer from outside his box in the 66th minute of a 1–1 league draw against Puszcza Niepołomice on 1 April 2024.
Mieczysław Koczwara	Poland	1928–1939	Podgórze Kraków	1	Penalty
Jakob Køhler Hansen	Denmark		Boldklubben Frem	1	Bicycle kick in the last minute.
**Ondřej Kolář**	Czech Republic	2013–	Slavia Prague	1	Last minute penalty kick.
**Enea Koliçi**	Albania	2006–	Gjilani	1	Headed in a 1–1 equalizer after a corner kick in 90+5 minute against Ballkani, and after scoring the goal, the match was interrupted after local fans entered the field. After this incident, Gjilan lost the match with an official result of 3–0, but Koliqi's goal remained in force.
**Gudmund Taksdal Kongshavn**	Norway	2009–	Vålerenga	1	Headed in a 2–2 equalizer after a corner kick in injury time against Viking FK
**Koo Sang-min**	South Korea	2014–	Ulsan Mipo	1	
**Yevgeniy Kostyukevich**	Belarus	2007–	Krumkachy Minsk	1	
Petr Kouba	Czechoslovakia; Czech Republic	1988–2005	Sparta Prague	1	Scored the 4th goal from penalty kick in national league match against SK České Budějovice in season 1994–95.
Per Morten Kristiansen	Norway		Haugesund	1	League goal in 2008.
Mogens Krogh	Denmark	1981–2002	Brøndby	1	
Vladan Kujović	Serbia and Montenegro; Serbia	1996–2019	Lierse	1	
**Klajdi Kuka**	Albania	2007–	Tërbuni Pukë	1	Scored a goal with a shot inside own penalty box against Kukësi
Kwon Jung-Hyuk	South Korea	2001–2017	Incheon United	1	
Bertrand Laquait	France	1997–2015	Charleroi	1	Scored from his own area against Mons, 21 December 2003.
**Carlos Lampe**	Bolivia	2013–	San José	1	
**Damian Lanza**	Ecuador	2002–	Deportivo Cuenca	1	Kick from the goal
Tom Ledgerwood	Scotland	1946–1959	Partick Thistle	1	
**Lee Seon-il**	South Korea	2019–	Ulsan Citizen FC	1	Goalkeeper goal on the team's first league match ever
Lee Yong-bal	South Korea	1994–2006	Bucheon SK	1	Penalty kick
**Karlo Letica**	Croatia	2015–	Hajduk Split	1	
**Michał Lewandowski**	Poland	2012–	Messina	1	Scored from his own area against Monterosi, 6 November 2022, at the 2022–23 Serie C.
Wilfredo Leyton	Chile	1971–1991	C.D. Aviación	1	Scored from his own area against San Antonio Unido, 23 October 1971, at the 1971 Campeonato Nacional Segunda División.
Dexter Lewis	Costa Rica	2000–2021	Alajuelense	1	
Anders Lindegaard	Denmark	2003–2022	Helsingborg	1	Scored against Falkenbergs FF, 18 July 2020, at the 2020 Allsvenskan.
Eric Lindon	England		Merthyr Town	1	
Živan Ljukovčan	Yugoslavia	1975–1990	Budućnost Titograd	1	
Rodrigo Llinás	Argentina		Atlanta	1	Penalty
Brian Lloyd	Wales	1967–1985	Stockport County	1	
**Andrew Lonergan**	England	2000–	Preston North End	1	
Ludwik Łoś	Poland	1938–1948	Lechia Gdańsk	1	Scored against Bałtyk Gdańsk in 1946
**Rhys Lovett**	England	2015–	Maidenhead United	1	On the final day of the 2020–21 season, he came off the bench against Boreham Wood in the 87th minute to play as a forward, and scored in the 93rd minute.
**Luiz Felipe**	Brazil	2011–	Friburguense	1	Injury time header against Portuguesa, 22 October 2016, at 2016 Copa Rio final.
Chris MacKenzie	England	1993–2012	Hereford United	1	
Keith MacRae	Scotland	1967–1982	Motherwell	1	
Félix Madrigal	Mexico	1981–1991	Monarcas Morelia	1	
Filip Madžovski	Macedonia	2003–2012	Rabotnički Kometal	1	Scored a last minute league goal against Sileks Kratovo.
Suhandi Mahali	Brunei	2004–2018	MS ABDB	1	Free kick scored against MS PDB.
**Giorgi Makaridze**	Georgia	2006–	Feirense	1	
**Mustafa Malayekah**	Saudi Arabia	2004–	Al Faisaly	1	Scored a stoppage time equalizer against Al-Fateh when he headed from a corner kick.
**Germans Māliņš**	Latvia	2009–	Skonto	1	Scored in 94th minute from a corner kick.
Manfred Manglitz	West Germany	1961–1971	MSV Duisburg	1	
Jorge Manduca	Argentina	2002-2022	Coquimbo Unido	1	Penalty.
**Alan Mannus**	Northern Ireland	2000–	Linfield	1	
**Rafael Mariano**	Brazil	2010–	Globo	1	Scored from his own penalty area against Guarany de Sobral on 30 July 2017, valid for the 2017 Campeonato Brasileiro Série D.
Enver Marić	Yugoslavia	1967–1985	Velež Mostar	1	
Alan Marriott	England	1997–2014	Mansfield Town	1	Scored from inside his own penalty area with a drop kick against Wrexham on 20 April 2012. The pitch was very wet and it allowed the ball to bounce over the Wrexham goalkeeper and into the net.
John Martin	Scotland	1980–2001	Airdrieonians	1	
Luis Martinez	Colombia	2001–2017	Colombia	1	
Eduardo Martini	Brazil	2000–2017	Avaí	1	
Otto Martler	Sweden	2006–2018	Falkenberg	1	
**Oscarine Masuluke**	South Africa	2015–	Baroka	1	Scored a last minute overhead kick goal against Orlando Pirates. The goal was nominated for the 2017 FIFA Puskás Award.
Jason Matthews	England	1998–2020	Weymouth	1	
James McAuley	Scotland	1880–1887	Scotland	1	McAulay played for Scotland as a goalkeeper in most of his international appearances, but also played as a forward. Scored a goal against Wales, 25 March 1882, playing as centre-forward.
Andy McClean	Northern Ireland		Cliftonville	1	Goal kick against Linfield at Windsor Park
**Olivia McDaniel**	Philippines	2024–	Stallion Laguna	1	Scored from a long-range free kick.
Jim McDonagh	Republic of Ireland	1970–1988	Bolton Wanderers	1	
Mark McGeown	Scotland	1988–2010	Stranraer	1	
**Kai McKenzie-Lyle**	Guyana	2016–	Guyana	1	Headed a last-minute goal on his international debut in a Gold Cup qualification match.
Peter McSevich	Scotland		Bournemouth	1	
Ezequiel Medrán	Argentina	2001–2017	Cobresal	1	
Bert Mehaffy	Northern Ireland		New Brighton	1	
Álvaro Mesén	Costa Rica	1992–2010	Alajuelense	1	Penalty
Daniel Mićić	Poland		TS Parzyce	1	Penalty
Simon Mignolet	Belgium	2006–2026	Sint-Truiden	1	Scored a penalty in the Belgian Second Division in 2009 for Sint-Truiden
Steve Mildenhall	England	1995–2017	Notts County	1	Long range free kick
Ibrahim Mirzapour	Iran	1997–2011	Foolad FC	1	Iran Pro league 2003–04
**Tatenda Mkuruva**	Zimbabwe	2013–	Michigan Stars	1	Penalty scored against the Maryland Bobcats, only goalkeeper goal in National Independent Soccer Association history.
Józef Młynarczyk	Poland	1971–1989	Odra Opole	1	Penalty
Lars Ivar Moldskred	Norway	2000–2010	Hødd	1	
Jan Möller	Sweden	1971–1993	Malmö FF	1	Möller scored on a penalty in a 5–0 victory over Hammarby in 1986.
Faryd Mondragón	Colombia	1990–2014	Independiente	1	
**Anthony Moccetti**	French Polynesia	2026–	Ticino	1	He scored a penalty during the 5–1 loss against Northern Cyprus at the 2026 CONIFA European Football Cup.
Víctor Monge	Costa Rica		Cartaginés	1	Penalty
**Mariano Monllor**	Argentina	2010–	Liniers	1	
David Montero	Spain	2003–2014	Guijuelo	1	Scored from a goal kick, 9 May 2009, against Real Unión.
Carlos Morel	Argentina	2008–2020	Deportivo Morón	1	Penalty kick scored against Defensores de Belgrano, 15 August 2015.
Elliot Morris	Northern Ireland	1999–2022	Glentoran	1	Scored against Institute, 12 January 2019, on his 723rd appearance for Glentoran.
Moscatto	Brazil	1991–1997	São Paulo	1	Penalty scored against Uberlândia at Torneio Rei Dadá
**Yves Bitséki Moto**	Gabon	2008–	Gabon	1	Scored against Zambia, 8 September 2015, in a friendly match.
Barel Mouko	Congo	1999–2015	Congo	1	Penalty scored against Swaziland during 2012 Africa Cup of Nations qualification
Mohd Syamsuri Mustafa	Malaysia	2002–2009	Malaysia U-23	1	Scored a long range goal with a drop kick from his own penalty area in Malaysia's 3–4 defeat against host country Vietnam.
Frank Moss	England	1928–1937	Arsenal	1	
**Tom Müller**	Germany	2009–	Hallescher FC	1	Injury time header against Rot-Weiß Erfurt, 21 October 2017, at the 2017–18 3. Liga.
**Vincent Müller**	Germany	2018–	MSV Duisburg	1	Free-kick from his own half against SV Meppen.
Moisés Muñoz	Mexico	1999–2018	América	1	Scored in the 92nd minute with a header to equalize for América at the 2013 Liga MX Clausura Liguilla. América went on to win on penalties.
Carlos Munutti	Argentina		Deportivo Cali	1	
**Iván Martínez Marques**	Spain	2020–	CD Numancia	1	He scored a free kick against Calvo Sotelo Puertollano CF on 8th November 2026.
Blendi Nallbani	Albania	1986–2010	Tirana	1	Scored a last minute penalty in a league match against Skënderbeu Korçë on 29 August 2009.
**Nauzet**	Spain	2002–	Fuerteventura	1	
Thomas Newton	England	1912–1924	Croydon Common	1	
Darwin Nieves	Uruguay	2010–2018	C.D. Arturo Fernández Vial	1	Scored from his own area against Iberia, 26 May 2012, at the 2012 Segunda División Profesional de Chile.
**Hampus Nilsson**	Sweden	2007–	IFK Värnamo	1	Scored a penalty in a 5–0 victory over Kristianstads FF.
**Alyssa Naeher**	United States	2006–	Chicago Stars	1	Stopped three penalty kicks and scored one in USWNT shootout against Canada. 90+9th minute equalizer scored from close range following a corner, in her 200th league appearance.
Nuno	Portugal	1992–2010	Porto	1	
Jan Nijhuis	Netherlands	1962	Sportclub Enschede	1	
**Nahuel Noll**	Germany	2021–2024	Hoffenheim II	1	
Kristine Nøstmo	Norway	2011–2021	Trondheims-Ørn	1	League goal in 2012.
Sebastian Nowak	Poland	2002–2018	Termalica Bruk-Bet	1	Scored in the 93rd minute.
Carsten Nulle	Germany	1995–2014	Carl Zeiss Jena	1	Scored against VfL Osnabrück on 20 February 2010.
Felipe Núñez	Chile	2000–2017	Fernández Vial	1	Free kick goal scored against Unión San Felipe.
Ahmed Obaid	Iraq		Al-Karkh	1	Scored a goal from open play inside his own penalty area against Al-Sulaikh, helped by a strong gust of wind. Scored in 1996–97 Iraqi Premier League.
Oceania	Brazil	1950–1968	Juventus	1	First goalkeeper goal scored during a professional match in Brazil.
Gabriel Ochoa Uribe	Colombia	1949–1955	Millonarios	1	Scored as a striker.
Steve Ogrizovic	England	1977–2000	Coventry City	1	
Ståle Oldeide	Norway	1986–2013	Lyn	1	Penalty kick goal scored in 1994.
**Raúl Olivares**	Chile	2006–	Jorge Wilstermann	1	
**Oliveira**	Brazil	2004–	Desportivo Brasil	1	Penalty kick scored against Primavera, 6 August 2022, at the Copa Paulista.
Stig Olsson	Sweden		Sandvikens IF	1	Scored a penalty in a match against Malmö FF in 1961. He was the first goalkeeper to score in the Allsvenskan.
**Denis Onyango**	Uganda	2004–	Supersport United	1	
Håkon Opdal	Norway	2001–2021	Start	1	Free kick scored from the halfway line.
Alfred Osmani	Albania	2000–2015	Dinamo Tirana	1	Scored a stoppage time equalizer from the penalty spot to earn his team a point in a league match against Bylis.
**Mark Oxley**	England	2007–	Hibernian	1	Scored in his first domestic league appearance for Hibernian.
Andrés Palop	Spain	1993–2014	Sevilla	1	In 2007, he scored an injury time equalising goal in a UEFA Cup round of 16 match against Shakhtar Donetsk, forcing extra time as a result. Sevilla had drawn 2–2 at home in the first leg and went on to win the second leg 3–2. They then went on to win the competition for a second consecutive year.
Goran Pandurović	Yugoslavia; FR Yugoslavia	1985–1998	Partizan	1	
**Carlos Paniego**	Paraguay	2016–	Independiente de Campo Grande	1	Injury time goal against Trinidense, 6 May 2022, at the Paraguayan División Intermedia.
**Sandra Paños**	Spain	2010–	Levante	1	Match-winning 87th-minute free kick from midfield, 4 June 2015.
**Nikos Papadopoulos**	Greece	2010–	Asteras Tripolis	1	On 21 March 2021, he scored an injury time equalising goal with a close range shot against Panathinaikos in the 2020–21 Super League Greece season.
**Andrea Paroni**	Italy	2008–	Virtus Entella	1	
**Rafael Pascoal**	Brazil	2011–	Guarulhos	1	Long-range free-kick against União Suzano, 14 May 2011, at the Campeonato Paulista Segunda Divisão.
Marco Pascolo	Switzerland	1986–2003	Sion	1	Scored against FC Aarau, 4 December 1988, at the 1988–89 Nationalliga A.
Alan Patterson	Northern Ireland	1972–1995	Glentoran	1	Winning goal in 1988–89 Irish League Cup Final against Linfield. The goal was scored in Patterson's home stadium, the Oval in Belfast.
**Paulo Rafael**	Brazil	2010–	São Francisco	1	Penalty kick scored against Cametá, 25 April 2016, at Campeonato Paraense.
**Paulo Vítor**	Brazil	2009–	Varzim	1	Scored from a free kick in his own half, against Penafiel, 27 August 2017, at 2017–18 LigaPro.
**Martín Perafán**	Argentina	2008–	Defensa y Justicia	1	Penalty kick goal cored against Huracán, 9 June 2012, at the 2011–12 Primera B Nacional.
Nicolás Peric	Chile	1998–2021	Universidad de Concepción	1	Goal scored in the Copa Sudamericana from a goal kick in his own penalty area
Michael Petkovic	Australia	1995–2011	Sivasspor	1	
Ivaylo Petrov	Bulgaria	1992–2009	CSKA Sofia	1	
**Guro Pettersen**	Norway	2008–	Piteå	1	Scored in open play. Won the Goal of the Year award in the 2021 Damallsvenskan.
**Goitseone Phoko**	Botswana	2012–	Botswana	1	Scored a penalty against Angola at the 2022 COSAFA Cup.
Martin Pieckenhagen	Germany	1991–2011	Heracles	1	
**Mirko Pigliacelli**	Italy	2012–	Universitatea Craiova	1	Penalty kick.
Krzysztof Pilarz	Poland	1999–2020	Pogoń Szczecin	1	Penalty scored in Polish Cup
Queco Piña	Spain	1998–2017	Celta de Vigo B	1	Scored through a goal kick in a 2–2 home draw against Rayo Vallecano B, 15 April 2012.
**João Pinho**	Portugal	2011–	Oliveirense	1	
**Damian Podleśny**	Poland	2012–	Lewart Lubartów	1	Scored an injury-time equalizing header in a 2–2 home draw against Start Krasnystaw on 9 June 2023.
Dragoslav Poleksić	Serbia and Montenegro; Montenegro	1993–2013	Hajduk Beograd	1	
Vukašin Poleksić	Serbia and Montenegro; Montenegro	1999–2017	Debrecen	1	
Mart Poom	Soviet Union; Estonia	1988–2009	Sunderland	1	Scored a 90th-minute header against his former team Derby County to salvage a 1–1 draw. The game was also Poom's first trip to Derby since leaving the team to play for Sunderland.
Tapas Posman	Papua New Guinea	2002–?	Papua New Guinea	1	Scored against American Samoa, 18 March 2002, at the 2002 OFC Nations Cup qualification.
Silvio Proto	Belgium	1999–2021	Germinal Beerschot	1	
**Wilson Quiñonez**	Paraguay	2008–	Sport Colombia	1	Scored from 83 meters out with a free kick, against Cerro Porteño, considered one of the longest free kicks ever scored in FIFA history.
Petar Radenković	Yugoslavia	1952–1970	Wormatia Worms	1	Scored against FSV Mainz during the Oberliga Südwest 1961/1962 season|
**Aleksandr Radionov**	Russia	2013–	Chertanovo Moscow	1	
**Santiago Ramírez**	Mexico	2015–	Atlético Morelia	1	Scored from his own penalty area against Celaya, at 2022–23 Liga de Expansión MX season
Michelangelo Rampulla	Italy	1979–2002	Cremonese	1	First goalkeeper to score from open play in Serie A history, after he equalised with a header at 1–1 away to Atalanta from a free-kick in the final minute.
**Pedro Rangel**	Brazil	2021–	Coritiba	1	Scored from a goal kick in a match against Cianorte
**Khaled Al Rashidi**	Kuwait	2005–	Al-Arabi	1	Headed in a 1–1 equalizer from a corner kick in stoppage time against Kuwait SC in a 2011–12 league match.
**Rayr**	Brazil	2018–	Tianguá	1	Injury time goal scored against Maracanã, 16 February 2021, at the Campeonato Cearense Série C.
Alejandro Rebollo	Spain	2002–2013	Palencia	1	
Oliver Reck	West Germany; Germany	1983–2005	Schalke 04	1	Penalty
Régis	Brazil	1985–1998	Paraná	1	Penalty kick scored against Santos, 20 November 1996, at Campeonato Brasileiro.
Armin Reichel	Germany	2001–2009	Wormatia Worms	1	
Andreas Reinke	East Germany; Germany	1987–2007	Real Murcia	1	
**Leandro Requena**	Argentina	2006–	Cobresal	1	He scored on 13 March 2023 against Colo-Colo in 2023 Chilean Primera División, when his kick from his goal sent the ball all the way to the opposing side’s goal without assistance, the ball bouncing once before flying over the head of the opposing goalkeeper, who was forwardly positioned and could not then stop it.
Riça	Portugal		Vizela	1	
Åke Richardsson	Sweden		IFK Sundsvall	1	Scored a penalty in a match against Landskrona in 1980.
Richard Richardsson	Sweden		Örebro	1	Scored a header from a corner kick in the 91st minute, as his team managed a 1–1 draw at Malmö FF in 2007.
Ricardo	Portugal	1993–2014	Boavista	1	
**Quillan Roberts**	Canada	2011–	Canada U-17	1	First goalkeeper goal in a traditional FIFA tournament. Scored in the 2011 FIFA U-17 World Cup in a 2–2 draw with England.
Tony Roberts	Wales	1987–2012	Dagenham & Redbridge	1	
Barry Roche	Republic of Ireland	2001–2020	Morecambe	1	Scored a header from a corner in a 1–1 draw against Portsmouth in the 93rd minute of a League Two match.
**Alejandro Robles Romero**	Andorra	2022–	Pirineus United	1	He scored from a penalty against UE Santa Coloma on September 13, 2026, in the Andorran Second Division.
Gilberto Rodríguez	Mexico	1964–1979	Guadalajara	1	Scored during the 1971–72 Copa México match against Cruz Azul.
**José Antonio Rodríguez**	Mexico	2011–	Guadalajara	1	
Pedro Rodríguez	Colombia	1992	Deportivo Pereira	1	
Alexis Rojas	Costa Rica		Alajuelense	1	Scored from a free kick
Yuji Rokutan	Japan	2006–2025	Shimizu S-Pulse	1	Header scored in a J.League match against Vissel Kobe
Deniss Romanovs	Latvia	1996–2019	Pro Duta	1	Penalty kick goal against Bontang, 24 October 2013, at the Indonesian Premier League.
**Luis Romero**	Venezuela	2008–	Deportes Recoleta	1	Scored a last-minute goal in a 1–2 away loss against Rangers de Talca through a header.
Peter Roney	Scotland	1909–1915	Bristol Rovers	1	Scored a penalty in the final game of the 1909–10 league season
Victor Roșca	Romania	1990–2015	Chimia Râmnicu Vâlcea	1	Scored in the Liga I.
**Francesco Rossi**	Italy	2009–	Lupa Roma	1	
Frank Rost	Germany	1991–2011	Werder Bremen	1	Scored an equalizer goal against Hansa Rostock (3–3)
Jyrki Rovio	Finland		KuPS	1	
Rubens	Brazil	1958–1977	Avaí	1	
**Armend Rugji**	Kosovo		Ballkani	1	Scored a penalty in a 2019–20 league match against Ferizaj
Peter Rufai	Nigeria	1980–2000	Nigeria	1	Penalty scored during 1994 African Cup of Nations qualification match against Ethiopia
Andrei Ryzhikov	Russia	2006–2017	Energomash Belgorod	1	
**Malkolm Nilsson Säfqvist**	Sweden	2013–	Halmstads BK	1	Injury time header against Västerås SK, 28 May 2022, at 2022 Superettan.
Darío Sala	Argentina	1994–2010	Deportivo Cali	1	Scored in 2003
**José Salcedo**	Spain	2009–	Guadalajara	1	Scored a last-minute equalizer in a 1–1 away draw against UD Almansa through a header.
Danny Sambridge	England	2025	Grays Athletic	1	He scored a penalty goal on his final appearance for the club.
**Diego Sánchez**	Chile	2007–	Coquimbo Unido	1	Penalty
Oswaldo Sánchez	Mexico	1993–2014	Chivas Guadalajara	1	
Ramiro Sánchez	Colombia	2014	Jaguares de Córdoba	1	Goal scored from free kick
**Sandy Sánchez**	Cuba	2012–	Cuba	1	Penalty
Juan José Santamaría	Spain	1968–1981	Racing Santander	1	Penalty
**Gino Santilli**	Argentina	2021–	Cerro Largo	1	Scored from his own area against Liverpool in a 2025 Liga AUF Uruguaya match.
Pablo Santillo	Argentina		Atlanta	1	
Dré Saris	Netherlands	1948–1958	BVV	1	First goalkeeper to score in the Eredivisie
**Saulo**	Brazil	2007–	Sport Recife	1	On 31 January 2011, against Vitória-PE during a 2011 Campeonato Pernambucano match, Saulo went forward and headed in a goal from a free kick in the final minute of the game. While celebrating the goal, he suffered a rupture in the anterior cruciate ligament that would prevent him from playing for several months.
**Gentian Selmani**	Albania	2014–	Laçi	1	
**Aleksandr Selikhov**	Russia	2012–	FC Ural Yekaterinburg	1	He scored a free kick against FC Chelyabinsk on 25th October 2026.
Seo Dong-myung	South Korea	1996–2008	Jeonbuk Hyundai Motors	1	Header
Andrei Sepci	Romania	1932–1940	Universitatea Cluj	1	
Serginho Boneca	Brazil	1975–1991	Vila Nova	1	Scored against Fluminense, at 1979 Campeonato Brasileiro.
Orges Shehi	Albania	1994–2018	Skënderbeu Korçë	1	Scored a penalty in a league match against Teuta Durrës on 6 December 2014.
Steve Sherwood	England	1971–1997	Watford	1	
Peter Shilton	England	1966–1997	Leicester City	1	Scored against Southampton in October 1967 direct from the opposite end of the pitch; the ball flew over Southampton goalkeeper Campbell Forsyth's head and into the goal. Leicester won the game 5–1.
**Timothy Shiraoka**	Japan	2015–	Aguilas–UMak	1	Shiraoka scored an equalizer in the 98th minute when he went to Stallion Laguna's penalty area after he made the final free kick. The 2–2 draw saw the first goal by a goalkeeper in the Philippines Football League.
Boris Shogenov	Russia	2005–	Dynamo Kirov	1	On 3 October 2015, he scored for Dynamk Kirov against FC Zenit-Izhevsk Izhevsk.
**Colin Shutler**	United States	2018–	Orange County	1	Second half stoppage time header against Sacramento Republic.
Kazimierz Sidorczuk	Poland	1985–2006	Kapfenberger SV	1	A drop kick goal in Austrian Second League scored on 22 July 2003
**Jörg Siebenhandl**	Austria	2007–	Wiener Neustadt	1	Scored from a direct free kick inside his own penalty area, 81 seconds into his top flight debut. This was the first goal scored in the 2011–12 Austrian Bundesliga season by any player for any team.
**Martín Silva**	Uruguay	2002–	Olimpia	1	Penalty scored against Sol de América, 9 December 2012, at the Paraguayan Primera División.
Zoran Simović	Yugoslavia	1975–1990	Napredak Kruševac	1	
Kenny Simpkins	Wales	1962–1969	Hartlepool United	1	Scored while playing as a centre forward
**Magnus Sjøeng**	Norway	2020–	Stabæk	1	Scored an equalizer in stoppage time against Egersund on 13 September 2015.
Zlatko Škorić	Yugoslavia	1960–1976	Olimpija Ljubljana	1	
Paul Smith	England	1998–2016	Nottingham Forest	1	As their initial League Cup tie against Leicester City was abandoned at half time with Nottingham Forest 1–0 up, both teams agreed to reinstate Forest's goal advantage in the rearranged fixture. Goalkeeper Paul Smith was allowed to walk the ball into the net unchallenged, straight from the kick-off.
**Jamie Sneddon**	Scotland	2014–	Partick Thistle	1	Scored an injury-time equaliser against Cove Rangers.
Radek Sňozík	Czech Republic	1993–2013	Bohemians 1905	1	Opened the scoring from the penalty spot in the 6th minute of a 1–2 national league home loss against FC Tescoma Zlín in November 2007.
Manuel Solano	Costa Rica		San Carlos	1	
**Rostislav Soldatenko**	Russia	2013–	SKA Rostov	1	Scored from his own penalty box, 30 October 2016, against FC Chayka Peschanokopskoye.
Ivica Solomun	Croatia	1991–2004	Varteks Varaždin	1	Penalty
Danijel Subašić	Croatia	2003–2023	Monaco	1	Scored a free kick in the 57th minute of a 2–1 away victory over Boulogne.
Nate Steinwascher	United States	2016–2024	Detroit City	1	Penalty in stoppage time against Miami FC in USL Championship regular season
**Dimitrije Stevanović**	Serbia	2020–	Javor	1	Header shot in additional time against Grafičar in 13th fixture of the 2026–27 Serbian First League campaign
**Sonny Stevens**	Netherlands	2010–	Dewa United	1	First goalkeeper to score in a Liga 1 (Indonesia) match
Kevin Stewart	Costa Rica		Limonense	1	
Stivione	Brazil	2003–2016	CTE Colatina	1	Free kick scored against Serra, 24 April 2005, at the Campeonato Capixaba.
**Vladimir Stojković**	Serbia and Montenegro; Serbia	2001–	Partizan	1	Scored from the penalty spot during a match against BSK Borča on 11 August 2012
Alfonso Subero	Spain	1988–2006	Burgos	1	Penalty kick goal scored against Badajoz.
Ollie Sutton	England	2024	Wroxham	1	Former England striker, Chris Sutton's son.
Massimo Taibi	Italy	1987–2009	Reggina	1	
Yuki Takita	Japan	1990–2000	Urawa Red Diamonds	1	Penalty scored against Yokohama Flügels on 9 November 1996, becoming the first goalkeeper to score in a J.League match.
**Alfredo Talavera**	Mexico	2013–	Deporvito Toluca F.C.	1	Scored in the 89th minute from a penalty
**Simione Tamanisau**	Fiji	2004–	Rewa	1	Scored against Suva, 19 October 2016, at the National Football League.
**Mason Terry**	England	2023–	Braintree Town	1	90+5th minute equaliser to send the National League Cup quarter-final match to a penalty shootout which was later won by Truro City; first goalkeeper to score in the National League Cup.
Luis Tapia	Chile	1972–1983	Deportes Linares	1	Scored from his own area against Huachipato FC, 20 June 1981, at the 1981 Campeonato Nacional Segunda División.
Tommy Thorpe	England		Barnsley	1	
Tobias	Brazil	1967–1986	Guarani	1	Penalty kick scored against Santa Cruz, at 1973 Campeonato Brasileiro.
Jan Tomaszewski	Poland	1968–1982	ŁKS Łódź	1	Penalty scored in Polish Ekstraklasa against Odra Opole on 30 September 1973
Freddie Toomer	England	2008–2025	HKFC	1	Scored a bicycle kick in the 6th minute of second-half stoppage time to level the score at 1–1.
Alberto Torres	Chile	1976–1995	Deportes Puerto Montt	1	Scored from his own area against Lozapenco, 16 March 1990, at the 1990 Copa Apertura Segunda División.
Pa Dembo Touray	Gambia	2000–2015	Djurgårdens IF	1	Scored a penalty in the 82nd minute in an 8–1 victory over Elfsborg
**Mark Travers**	Republic of Ireland	2017–	Weymouth	1	
**Kyle Trenerry**	England	2017–	Farsley Celtic	1	Scored from his own area against Curzon Ashton, 20 March 2022, at the 2021–22 National League.
**Emanuel Trípodi**	Argentina	2002–	C.A.I.	1	
Daniel Tudor	Romania	1993–2012	Videoton	1	
**Philipp Tschauner**	Germany	2004–	St. Pauli	1	
Iain Turner	Scotland	2002–2019	Preston North End	1	Scored from his own penalty area in a 2–0 win against Notts County in a League One match.
**Anatoliy Trubin**	Ukraine	2019–	Benfica	1	In the 90+8th minute, Trubin scored the final goal in a 4–2 victory against Real Madrid which saw Benfica qualify for the UEFA Champions League knockout play-offs by goal difference.
Ubirajara Alcântara	Brazil	1959–1982	Flamengo	1	Scored from a goal kick in a match against Madureira, 19 September 1970, becoming the second goalkeeper to score in a Brazilian professional match.
Ignacy Uptas	Poland		Widzew Łódź	1	Penalty
**Oscar Ustari**	Argentina	2005–	Independiente	1	Penalty kick goal scored against Quilmes, 10 June 2007. Leaves the pitch injured after the goal.
Albert Uytenbogaardt	South Africa	1947–1968	Charlton Athletic	1	
Guillermo Valle	Chile		Deportes Arica	1	Scored from his own area against Súper Lo Miranda, 16 March 1986, at the 1986 Copa Apertura Segunda División.
Raimond van der Gouw	Netherlands	1985–2007	AGOVV	1	Scored a penalty in the last minute of the last match of his 23-year career. Van der Gouw was 44 years of age at the time.
Edwin van der Sar	Netherlands	1990–2011	Ajax	1	Penalty
Diego Vandre	Brazil		Roma Apucarana	1	Free kick
**Tobías Vargas**	Paraguay	2009–	Capiatá	1	
**Alberto Varo**	Spain	2004–	Pobla de Mafumet	1	On 6 September, he saved a penalty and also scored the equalizer in a 1–1 draw against CF Badalona.
**Aleksandr Vasyutin**	Russia	2012–	FC Lahti	1	Scored a last minute equalizer goal against PK-35 Vantaa, 13 August 2016.
Eric Viscaal	Netherlands	1986–2006	Gent	1	Viscaal was a striker who replaced the goalkeeper who had received a red card. First Viscaal stopped a penalty and one minute later, as a goalkeeper, scored a penalty himself
**Danny Vukovic**	Australia	2002–	Wellington Phoenix	1	Scored a 94th-minute penalty against North Queensland Fury on 13 February 2011. This came only a week after the previous match, in which Vukovic had hit the opposing team's crossbar after making a long clearance that bounced over the head of the opposing goalkeeper.
**Wang Zhuo**	China	2010–	Dalian K'un City	1	Scored a 99th-minute goal against Xi'an Chongde Ronghai on 5 April 2024.
Gavin Ward	England	1987–2011	Tranmere Rovers	1	
**Ronald Warisan**	Papua New Guinea	2008–	Lae City Dwellers	1	
Mirosław Warzecha	Poland	1990–2002	Górnik Zabrze	1	Penalty scored in league cup
Anderson Waterman	England	1906–1910	Fluminense	1	Penalty kick scored against Riachuelo at 1908 Campeonato Carioca. Riachuelo lost the game by 11–0 in protest against the referee's performance. Subsequently, the club withdrew from the championship and the result was considered W/O. Is the first goal scored by a goalkeeper in Brazilian football.
Chris Weale	England	2000–2019	Yeovil Town	1	
**John Wilker**	Brazil	2015–	Atlético Cearense	1	Injury time bicycle kick against Potiguar de Mossoró, 21 July 2024, at 2024 Campeonato Brasileiro Série D.
Charlie Williams	England	1891–1905	Manchester City	1	First goalkeeper ever to score from open play in a competitive match, scored against Bolton Wanderers on 18 April 1900.
Jason Williams	Bermuda	2001–2009	North Village Rams	1	Match winning goal scored directly from a goal kick in 2011
**Ben Wilson**	England	2011–	Coventry City	1	Scored an injury-time equaliser in an EFL Championship match against Blackburn Rovers in 2023.
Grégory Wimbée	France	1992–2011	Nancy	1	
Lars Windfeld	Denmark	1989–2000	AGF	1	Scored against Odense Boldklub, commonly known as OB, in the Danish Superliga in 1995.
**Andrzej Witan**	Poland	2009–	Bytovia Bytów	1	Scored a last-minute winning goal from a header against GKS Katowice in the last matchday of the 2019–20 I liga season. Despite this, both teams would be relegated.
**Ben Winterbottom**	England	2023–	Barrow A.F.C.	1	He scored against Gateshead F.C. on 14th November 2026.
George Wood	Scotland	1970–1997	East Stirlingshire	1	Scored against Queen of the South on 9 January 1971
**Gennadios Xenodochof**	Greece	2006–	AEL	1	Scored last-minute header against Panachaiki in a Greek Football Cup match on 28 November 2015.
Norihiro Yamagishi	Japan	2001–2018	Montedio Yamagata	1	Scored a header in a J2 League match against Júbilo Iwata.
Cheng-hsing Yang	Chinese Taipei		Chinese Taipei	1	Scored a penalty in a 2003 East Asian Cup qualifying match against Mongolia, and was the first Taiwanese goalkeeper to score in an international competition.
Fikret Yılmaz	Turkey	1984–1996	Kemerspor	1	Scored his only career goal in a TFF Third League 2–1 loss to Antalya Köy Hizmetlerispor on 12 August 1991.
Zé Carlos	Brazil	1983–2000	Flamengo	1	
**Moustapha Zeghba**	Algeria	2010–	Damac	1	Scored a goal from open play inside his own penalty area against Al-Tai in the 2022–23 Saudi Professional League season.
Yuri Zhevnov	Belarus	1996–2016	BATE Borisov	1	During a 2004–05 UEFA Cup qualification match against Dinamo Tbilisi he scored a goal from his own half.
Zico	Brazil	1974–1990	Cascavel EC	1	Scored from his own box against Colorado in the 1980 Campeonato Paranaense.
Oscar Zijlstra	Netherlands	1979–1987	Cambuur	1	Scored from a goal kick helped by a strong wind. The ball bounced in front of and then over opposite goalkeeper Ton Verkerk of Willem II.
Dragan Žilić	Serbia and Montenegro; Serbia	1992–2019	Rijeka	1	Injury time header against Konavljanin, 29 November 2006, at the 2006–07 Croatian Cup semi-finals.
Zdeněk Zlámal	Czech Republic	2002–2021	Bohemians 1905	1	First goalkeeper to score a non-penalty goal in the Czech First League
Fakhrul Zulhazmi	Brunei	2009–2017	Brunei Youth Team	1	First goalkeeper to score in the Brunei leagues, a penalty against LLRC FT.
Ralf Zumdick	West Germany; Germany	1980–1995	VfL Bochum	1	Penalty

== See also ==
- List of top international women's football goalscorers by country
- List of women's footballers with 100 or more international goals
- List of top international men's football goalscorers by country
- List of goalkeepers who have scored in the Premier League
- List of men's footballers with 50 or more international goals
- List of outfield association footballers who played in goal
- List of men's footballers with 500 or more goals
