= Burgener =

Burgener is a surname. Notable people with the surname include:

- Alexander Burgener (1845–1910), Swiss mountain guide, first ascentionist of many mountains in the western Alps
- Casey Burgener (born 1982), American weightlifter
- Clair Burgener (1921–2006), American politician
- Erich Burgener (born 1951), football goalkeeper
- Hans Burgener (born 1964), Swiss wheelchair curler
- Jocelyn Burgenern (born 1949), Canadian politician
