= Oscar Zijlstra =

Dutch footballer (1952–2025)

Personal information
- Date of birth: 31 January 1952
- Place of birth: Leeuwarden, Netherlands
- Date of death: 28 August 2025 (aged 73)
- Position(s): Goalkeeper

Senior career*
| Years | Team | Apps | (Gls) |
| 1973–1979 | LVV Friesland | 101 | (0) |
| 1979–1987 | Cambuur | 185 | (1) |
- * Club domestic league appearances and goals

Oscar Zijlstra (31 January 1952 – 28 August 2025) was a Dutch footballer who played as a goalkeeper.

== Career ==
Ziljstra's profession was butcher and he started his career with Dutch side LVV Friesland. His three older brothers also played for the club and Oscar made his debut for them aged 20. He played 101 games for LVV before joining professional side SC Cambuur in 1979. The heavy-moustached Zijlstra came to prominence with an extraordinary goal, a goalkick against Willem II which totally surprised Ton Verkerk in November 1985 and he totalled 204 matches for Cambuur.

He retired from professional football in 1987.

== Personal life and death ==
Zijlstra had six older siblings. After retiring from professional football, he lived in Burgum, the Netherlands. Zijlstra was married to Bea Feenstra and they had two children.

Zijlstra died on 28 August 2025, at the age of 73.

== See also ==
- List of goalscoring goalkeepers
