= Yerko Urra =

Chilean footballer (born 1996)

Personal information
- Full name: Yerko Andrés Urra Cortés
- Date of birth: 9 July 1996 (age 30)
- Place of birth: Mulchén, Chile
- Height: 1.90 m (6 ft 3 in)
- Position: Goalkeeper

Youth career
- Huachipato

Senior career*
Years	Team	Apps	(Gls)
2016–2022	Huachipato	34	(0)
2021	→ Deportes Temuco (loan)	31	(0)
2023–2026	Deportes Temuco	117	(2)

International career^{‡}
2019	Chile		
- * Club domestic league appearances and goals as of 11 November 2026 ‡ National team caps and goals as of 31 January 2022

Yerko Andrés Urra Cortés (born 9 July 1996) is a Chilean footballer who plays as a goalkeeper.

== Career ==
Urra spent five seasons with Deportes Temuco from 2021 to 2026.

== See also ==
- List of goalscoring goalkeepers
