= Žarko Lučić =

Montenegrin footballer

Personal information
- Full name: Žarko Lučić
- Date of birth: 14 December 1968 (age 57)
- Place of birth: Pljevlja, SR Montenegro, SFR Yugoslavia
- Height: 1.88 m (6 ft 2 in)
- Position: Goalkeeper

Senior career*
Years	Team	Apps	(Gls)
1992–1995	Rudar Pljevlja	87	(1)
1995–1999	Lovćen	127	(0)
1999–2003	Budućnost Podgorica	127	(15)
2003	Torpedo Moscow	0	(0)
2003–2004	Kom	28	(3)
2004–2007	Mladost Podgorica	16+	(4+)
2007–2008	Slavija Sarajevo	0	(0)
Total		385+	(23+)

International career
2000–2001	FR Yugoslavia	5	(0)

Managerial career
- Zeta (gk coach)
- Dacia Chișinău (gk coach)
- Rudar Pljevlja (gk coach)
- * Club domestic league appearances and goals

Žarko Lučić (Montenegrin Cyrillic: Жарко Лучић; born 14 December 1968) is a Montenegrin former footballer who played as a goalkeeper and made five appearances for the FR Yugoslavia national team. During his career, on numerous occasions he scored as a goalkeeper, with the IFFHS attributing him with having scored 21 goals. After retiring from his playing career, he worked as a goalkeeping coach, most recently at Rudar Pljevlja.

== International career ==
Lučić made his international debut for FR Yugoslavia on 15 November 2000 in a friendly match against Romania, which finished as a 1–2 away loss. He made five appearances in total for the team, earning his final cap on 25 January 2001 in the Millennium Super Soccer Cup against Bosnia and Herzegovina, which finished as a 2–0 win.

== Career statistics ==
=== International ===
FR Yugoslavia
Year	Apps	Goals
2000	1	0
2001	4	0
Total	5	0
