= Thyago =

Brazilian footballer (born 1989)

Personal information
- Full name: Thyago Cavalcante Costa
- Date of birth: 1 October 1989 (age 37)
- Place of birth: Brazil
- Height: 1.89 m (6 ft 2 in)
- Position: Goalkeeper

Youth career
- –2012: Portuguesa Santista

Senior career*
Years	Team	Apps	(Gls)
2012–2014	Portuguesa Santista		
2014	Riopardense		(3)
2015–2016	Jabaquara		(4)
2016	→ Avenida (loan)		
2017	Portuguesa Santista		
2018	Santa Maria-DF		
2018	Taboão da Serra		
2018–2019	Olímpico		
2023	Olímpico		
- * Club domestic league appearances and goals as of 1 November 2023

Thyago Cavalcante Costa (born 1 October 1989), better known as Thyago, is a Brazilian professional footballer who plays as a goalkeeper.

== Career ==
Goalkeeper with spells at Santos city clubs, Portuguesa Santista and Jabaquara, where he was notable for his goals.

== See also ==
- List of goalscoring goalkeepers
