= Carlos Chávez (footballer) =

Colombian footballer (born 1984)

Personal information
- Full name: Carlos Geovanni Chávez Ospina
- Date of birth: 7 August 1984 (age 42)
- Place of birth: Cali, Colombia
- Height: 1.81 m (5 ft 11 in)
- Position: Goalkeeper

Youth career
- 1993–2004: América de Cali

Senior career*
Years	Team	Apps	(Gls)
2005–2007	América de Cali	2	(0)
2006	→ Cortuluá (loan)	4	(0)
2007	→ Unión Magdalena (loan)	2	(0)
2008–2012	Patriotas	110	(2)
2010	→ Inti Gas (loan)	5	(0)
2013	Atlético Bucaramanga	40	(3)
2014–2015	Uniautónoma	19	(0)
2016	Atlético Cali	15	(0)
- * Club domestic league appearances and goals as of 13 December 2015

Carlos Geovanni Chávez Ospina (born 7 August 1984) is a Colombian former professional footballer who played as a goalkeeper.

== Career ==
Chavez joined América de Cali's youth academy at age 8, and made his professional debut with the club in 2005. He spent most of his time at the club on loans to Cortuluá in 2006 and Unión Magdalena in 2007. In 2008, he joined Patriotas Boyacá of the Categoría Primera B. In 2010, he had a short stint on loan at Peruvian club Inti Gas.

On 17 December 2011, Patriotas beat Chavez's former club, America de Cali, in the 2011 promotion playoffs and Chavez scored the last penalty in the shootout, which sent America to the second division for the first time in the club's history. Chavez was hit with death threats after the match, and stated that he had received bribes to play poorly so America would win the match. The goalkeeper left the club in 2012, joining Atlético Bucaramanga and playing with them for the 2013 season, where he scored 3 goals. In 2014 and 2015 he played for Uniautónoma.

The keeper finally announced his retirement at the conclusion of the 2016 season, having spent the year with Atlético Cali. Despite not playing much for America de Cali, he is still a big fan to this day because of his extensive youth career with the club.

== See also ==
- List of goalscoring goalkeepers
