= Milton Patiño =

Colombian footballer (born 1973)

Personal information
- Full name: Milton Fernando Patiño Rosero
- Date of birth: 7 March 1973 (age 53)
- Place of birth: Cali, Valle, Colombia
- Height: 1.78 m (5 ft 10 in)
- Position: Goalkeeper

Team information
- Current team: Millonarios
- Number: 35

Senior career*
Years	Team	Apps	(Gls)
1993–2002	Atlético Nacional		
2003	Atlético Junior		
2004	Atlético Nacional	20	(0)
2004	Deportes Quindío	4	(0)
2005	Atlético Junior	10	(0)
2005	Deportes Tolima	2	(0)
2006	Deportes Quindío	13	(0)
2007	América de Cali	11	(0)
2007–2008	Deportivo Pasto	34	(0)
2009	Millonarios	4	(3)
2011	Fortaleza	4	(0)
- * Club domestic league appearances and goals as of 1 September 2009

Milton Fernando Patiño Rosero (born 7 March 1973) is a Colombian retired football goalkeeper who last played for Fortaleza in the Categoría Primera B.

== Club career ==
Patiño previously played for several clubs in the Copa Mustang, including Atlético Nacional and Deportivo Pasto. He joined Millonarios in January 2009, becoming the club's third goalkeeper.

== Titles ==
Season	Club	Title
1999	Atlético Nacional	Copa Mustang

== See algo ==
- List of goalscoring goalkeepers
