= Oceania (footballer) =

Brazilian footballer

Personal information
- Full name: Mauro Aparecido de Lucas
- Date of birth: 1936
- Place of birth: Bragança Paulista, Brazil
- Date of death: 10 February 2017 (aged 80–81)
- Place of death: Bragança Paulista, Brazil
- Height: 1.80 m (5 ft 11 in)
- Position: Goalkeeper

Youth career
- –1952: Ferroviários (Bragança Paulista)

Senior career*
| Years | Team | Apps | (Gls) |
| 1952–1955 | Bragantino | | |
| 1955–1956 | Juventus | | |
| 1956–1962 | Bragantino | | |
| 1963–1965 | Palmeiras (SJBV) | | |
| 1966–1968 | Bragantino | | |
- * Club domestic league appearances and goals as of 5 September 2023

Mauro Aparecido de Lucas (1936 – 10 February 2017), better known as Oceania, was a Brazilian professional footballer who played as a goalkeeper.

== Career ==
Being tall for his age, he started his professional career at the age of 16 at CA Bragantino, a club where he became notable. After a brilliant match against Portuguesa de Desportos, he was transferred to CA Juventus, where he accomplished the greatest feat of his career.

On 25 March 1955, in the match São Bento (São Caetano do Sul) vs. Juventus, he became the first professional goalkeeper to score a goal in Brazilian football (and the third in general), and also being the first to did the feat with the ball in play, as he accomplished the feat by kicking from his own penalty area.

== Personal life ==
The nickname Oceania came from the pack of cigarettes that Mauro used to smoke.

== Death ==
Oceania died at Hospital Universitário São Francisco, in Bragança Paulista, due to an infarction.

== See also ==
- List of goalscoring goalkeepers
