= Ludwik Łoś =

Polish footballer

Personal information
- Full name: Ludwik Konstanty Łoś
- Date of birth: 1 January 1914
- Place of birth: Vilnius, Russian Empire
- Date of death: 11 November 1995 (aged 81)
- Place of death: Gdańsk, Poland
- Height: 1.77 m (5 ft 10 in)
- Position: Goalkeeper

Senior career*
Years	Team	Apps	(Gls)
1938–1939	Śmigły Wilno		
1940–1945	JSO Vilnius		
1946–1948	Lechia Gdańsk	6	(1)
- * Club domestic league appearances and goals

Ludwik Łoś (1 January 1914 – 11 November 1995) was a Polish footballer who played as a goalkeeper.

== Biography ==
Łoś was born in Vilnius in 1914, which at the time was part of the Russian Empire. At the end of World War 1, the land around Vilnius was given to the Second Polish Republic. In the 1930s Łoś started playing football, and it is known that he played for Śmigły Wilno in Poland's top division, the 1938 Ekstraklasa season. Despite Śmigły being relegated it was an historic season for the club as it was the only time they played in Poland's top division. At the outbreak of World War 2, Śmigły Wilno ceased to exist. During the war it is known he played for JSO Vilnius. At the conclusion of the war the Vilnius became part of another country for the third time during life. Due to the transfers of Polish people to the new lands of what would become the Polish People's Republic, Łoś moved to Gdańsk and joined the newly founded Lechia Gdańsk. He made his Lechia debut on 12 May 1946 against Gryf Wejherowo. Despite playing as a goalkeeper, it is known that Łoś scored in the league for Lechia, his goal coming in the 12–0 win over Bałtyk Gdańsk. In total Łoś made 6 appearances for Lechia and scored 1 goal during his time at the club, as well as helping the team to reach the Ekstraklasa for the first time in its history. Łoś died on 11 November 1995 aged 81.

== Honours ==
Lechia Gdańsk

- A klasa, gr. III: 1947–48

== See also ==
- List of goalscoring goalkeepers
