= August Strömberg =

Swedish footballer

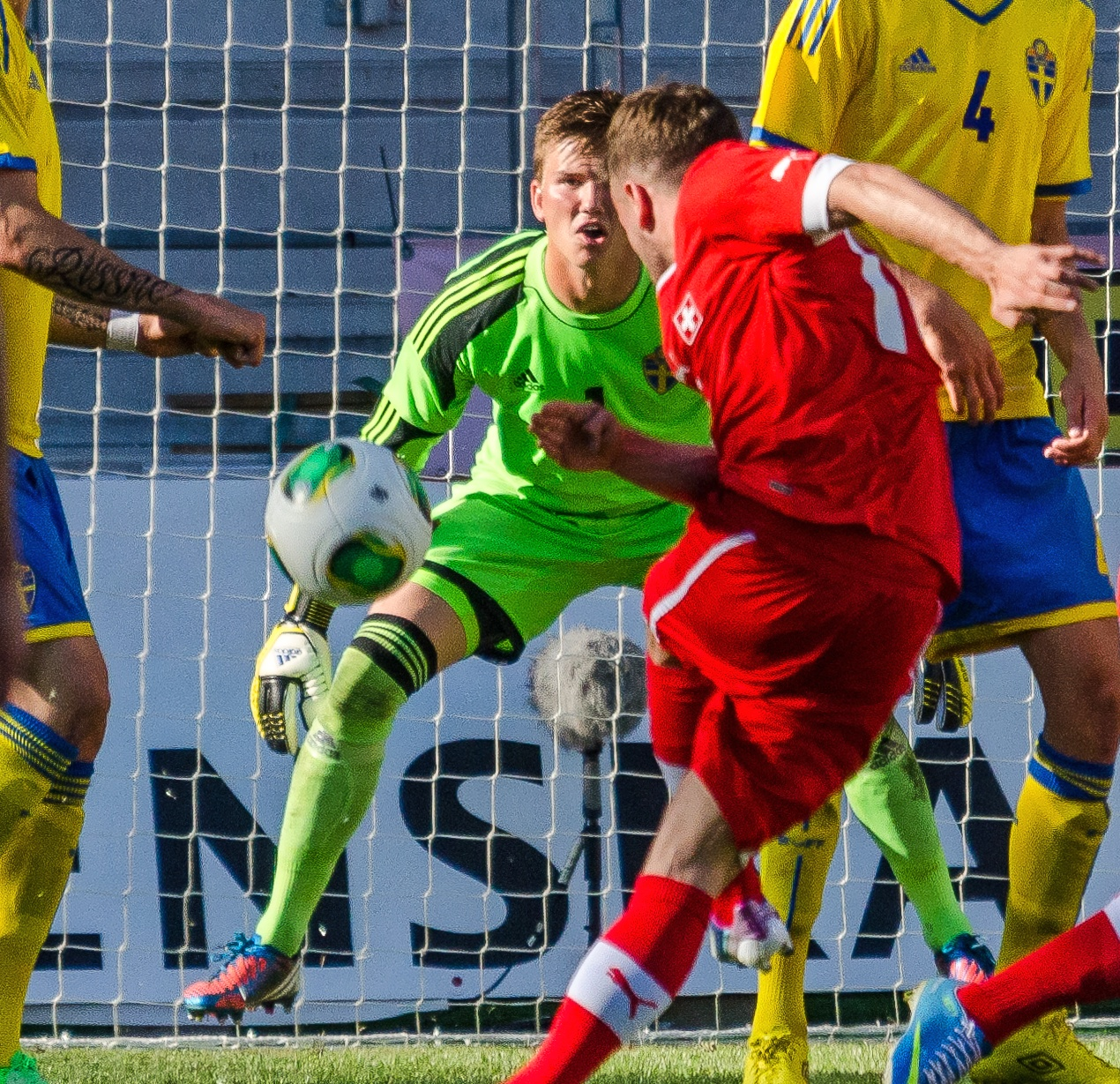
- Strömberg in action as Swedish U21 goalkeeper against Switzerland

Personal information
- Full name: Samuel August Strömberg
- Date of birth: 28 February 1992 (age 34)
- Place of birth: Gothenburg, Sweden
- Height: 1.93 m (6 ft 4 in)
- Position: Goalkeeper

Team information
- Current team: Kongsvinger
- Number: 1

Youth career
- Qviding FIF

Senior career*
Years	Team	Apps	(Gls)
2009	Qviding FIF	0	(0)
2010–2012	IFK Göteborg	0	(0)
2013–2015	Degerfors IF	70	(0)
2016	Ljungskile SK	29	(0)
2017–2018	Gefle IF	51	(0)
2019–2021	Varbergs BoIS	46	(1)
2021–	Kongsvinger	97	(1)

International career
2009	Sweden U17	2	(0)
2010–2011	Sweden U19	7	(0)
2013–2014	Sweden U21	6	(0)
- * Club domestic league appearances and goals as of 14 November 2024

August Strömberg (born 28 February 1992) is a Swedish professional footballer who plays for Kongsvinger.

== Club career ==
On 26 July 2020, Strömberg scored his first career goal in a 2020 Allsvenskan game for Varberg against IF Elfsborg that finished 3–3. On 3 August 2021, he signed for Norwegian Second Division club Kongsvinger. On 7 July 2022, he scored his second career goal in a 2022 Norwegian First Division game against Bryne that finished 1–1.
