= Krzysztof Słabik =

Polish footballer

Personal information
- Full name: Krzysztof Słabik
- Date of birth: 16 July 1953 (age 73)
- Place of birth: Zawiercie, Poland
- Height: 1.83 m (6 ft 0 in)
- Position: Goalkeeper

Senior career*
Years	Team	Apps	(Gls)
1970–1977	Lechia Gdańsk	126	(2)
1977–1984	Zagłębie Sosnowiec	67	(0)
1984–1986	Stal Rzeszów		
- * Club domestic league appearances and goals

Krzysztof Słabik (born 16 July 1953) is a Polish former footballer who played as a goalkeeper.

== Biography ==
Słabik started his career playing with Lechia Gdańsk, making his debut aged 17 on 9 August 1970 against Gwardia Koszalin. From his debut Słabik kept 10 consecutive clean sheets, conceding the first goal of his career in his 11th appearance. After an impressive first season making 16 appearances, the following season Lechia ended up winning the III liga (group IV) and secured promotion to the II liga. During Lechia's league winning campaign Słabik made a total of 7 appearances. After Lechia's promotion to the II liga Słabik staked a claim for the starting position, being the number 1 goalkeeper for the next three seasons, finding himself as the second choice goalkeeper the two seasons after that. Słabik has the recognition of scoring two goals during the 1974–75 season, scoring penalties against Warta Poznań and Olimpia Poznań. In total Słabik made a total of 133 appearances and scored 2 goals over seven seasons with Lechia.

After leaving Lechia, Słabik joined Zagłębie Sosnowiec. While his appearances in the II liga for the club are unknown, it is known that during his time with Zagłębie he made 67 appearances in Poland's top division, also making 2 appearances in the 1978–79 edition of the UEFA Cup Winners' Cup. After seven years with Zagłębie, Słabik spent the final two years of his career with Stal Rzeszów, retiring in 1986 aged 33.

== Honours ==
Lechia Gdańsk

- III liga, group IV: 1971–72

== See also ==
- List of goalscoring goalkeepers
