= Warlei (footballer) =

Brazilian footballer

Personal information
- Full name: Warlei Cesar Tarata Santos
- Date of birth: 1 January 1999 (age 27)
- Place of birth: Santo Amaro, Brazil
- Position: Goalkeeper

Team information
- Current team: Arauco Prado

Youth career
- 2015: Guaratinguetá
- 2016–2017: Mauaense
- 2018–2019: União Mogi

Senior career*
Years	Team	Apps	(Gls)
2019	União Mogi		
2019	Fluminense de Feira		
2020	Mauá		
2021	Capital-TO		
2021	União Mogi		
2022	Manthiqueira		
2023–	Arauco Prado		
- * Club domestic league appearances and goals as of 30 October 2023

Warlei Cesar Tarata Santos (born 1 January 1999), simply known as Warlei, is a Brazilian professional footballer who plays as a goalkeeper.

== Career ==
Warlei joined União Mogi in 2019, after a good performing in the Copa São Paulo de Futebol Jr., where the team from Mogi das Cruzes eliminated Santos FC.

He also scored two goals in his career: the first against Paulista, 9 July 2022, at the Campeonato Paulista Segunda Divisão. and another one in 2023 Copa Simón Bolívar.

== See also ==
- List of goalscoring goalkeepers
