= Alejandro Sinisterra =

Colombian footballer (died 2014)

Personal information
- Date of birth: 11 July 1937
- Place of birth: Cali, Colombia
- Date of death: 17 August 2014 (aged 77)
- Position: Goalkeeper

Youth career
- 1949–1956: Deportivo Cali

Senior career*
Years	Team	Apps	(Gls)
1952–1956	Deportivo Cali		(0)
1956–1960	Atlético Bucaramanga		(1)
1960–1976	Cúcuta Deportivo	252	(11)
Total		252+	(12)

Managerial career
- Deportivo Galicia
- Aduana
- Guardia Nacional
- Acord Norte de Santander
- * Club domestic league appearances and goals

Alejandro Sinisterra (11 July 1937 – 17 August 2014) was a Colombian professional footballer who played as a goalkeeper.

== Club career ==
Sinisterra began his youth career at the Sarmiento Lora School as a striker but he was converted into a goalkeeper due to a lack of playing time. He then played in the academy of Deportivo Cali between 1949 and 1956. He debuted for Deportivo Cali at the age of fifteen in 1952 and beginning in 1954, he scored three goals for the club to become the first Colombian goalkeeper to score a goal.

He made the move to Atlético Bucaramanga in 1956 and he scored two goals for the club in 1958. He left in 1960.

He left to join Cúcuta Deportivo, where he made 251 appearances. He did not score during his first eight years at the club until he was called up to take a penalty during the match against Independiente Medellín in which José Omar Verdún was sent off. He scored eight goals for the club, all penalties, between 1968 and 1969, but he was no longer the designated penalty taker for the club in 1970 after his ninth penalty kick was saved by Independiente Santa Fe goalkeeper Manuel Ovejero.

He retired in 1976 and he had scored thirteen competitive goals and sixteen (possibly up to thirty-one goals according to one of his sons) total goals including friendlies. Sinisterra's goalscoring record as a goalkeeper in the Liga DIMAYOR stood until it was broken by René Higuita in 1999.

== Managerial career ==
After 1976, he managed Deportivo Galicia, Aduana, Guardia Nacional, and Acord Norte de Santander.

== Personal life ==
He married Alix Martínez de Sinisterra and they had six children together, five of which were: Alfredo Rodolfo, Jesús Alejandro, Luz Amparo, Alix María, and Marta Patricia.

He died on 17 August 2014 at the age of 77 after a cardiac arrest.

== See also ==
- List of goalscoring goalkeepers
