= Richard Richardsson (footballer) =

Swedish footballer

Personal information
- Date of birth: 12 April 1979 (age 47)
- Height: 1.88 m (6 ft 2 in)
- Position: Goalkeeper

Youth career
- Latorps IF

Senior career*
Years	Team	Apps	(Gls)
2004–2005	Trelleborgs FF	36	(0)
2006	IFK Göteborg	0	(0)
2007–2008	Örebro SK	4	(1)
2008–2010	IK Sirius	45	(0)
2011–2012	Hudiksvalls ABK		
2014	GIF Sundsvall		

Managerial career
- 2014–2015: GIF Sundsvall (goalk.coach)
- * Club domestic league appearances and goals

Richard Richardsson (born 12 April 1979) is a Swedish retired football goalkeeper. In the 2007 Allsvenskan he scored a goal for Örebro SK.
