= Ubirajara Alcântara =

Brazilian footballer

Personal information
- Full name: Ubirajara da Silva Alcântara
- Date of birth: 27 February 1946 (age 80)
- Place of birth: Rio de Janeiro, Brazil
- Position: Goalkeeper

Youth career
- 1959–1966: Flamengo

Senior career*
Years	Team	Apps	(Gls)
1966–1973	Flamengo	121	(1)
1966	→ Olaria (loan)		
1969	→ Fluminense de Feira (loan)		
1971	→ America-RJ		
1973	→ Avaí (loan)		
1973–1974	Olaria		
1974	→ Avaí (loan)		
1974	Itabaiana		
1975–1981	Botafogo	106	(0)
1976	→ Flamengo (loan)		
1980	→ Itabaiana (loan)		
1982	Vila Nova		
- * Club domestic league appearances and goals as of 31 October 2023

Ubirajara da Silva Alcântara (born 27 February 1946), is a Brazilian former professional footballer who played as a goalkeeper.

== Career ==
Trained in Flamengo's youth sectors, he played for the club from 1966 to 1973. He also played for Fluminense de Feira, Avaí, Olaria, Botafogo and Itabaiana.

On 19 September 1970 scored a goal from his own penalty area, in the match against Madureira valid for 1970 Campeonato Carioca. The goal became known as the "Goal of the Howling Winds" ("Gol dos ventos uivantes"), due to the interference of the wind in the feat.

After retiring, he graduated in advertising and marketing. He lived in the USA for years and is fluent in English.

== Honours ==
Flamengo

- Campeonato Carioca: 1972
- Taça Guanabara: 1970, 1972
- Torneio do Povo: 1972

Fluminense de Feira

- Campeonato Baiano: 1969

Avaí

- Campeonato Catarinense: 1973

Botafogo

- Taça Augusto Pereira da Mota: 1975

Itabaiana

- Campeonato Sergipano: 1980

== See also ==
- List of goalscoring goalkeepers
