= Arthur Barroso =

Brazilian footballer

Personal information
- Full name: Arthur Pedro de Oliveira Barroso
- Date of birth: 19 December 1989 (age 36)
- Place of birth: Nova Friburgo, Brazil
- Height: 1.87 m (6 ft 2 in)
- Position: Goalkeeper

Team information
- Current team: Resende (head coach)

Senior career*
| Years | Team | Apps | (Gls) |
| 2008–2018 | Resende | | |
| 2008 | → Sampaio Corrêa-RJ (loan) | | |
| 2012 | → Volta Redonda (loan) | | |
| 2017 | → Portuguesa-RJ (loan) | | |
| 2019 | URT | | |
| 2020 | Democrata-GV | | |
| 2020 | Tupynambás | | |
| 2021 | Sertãozinho | | |
| 2021–2022 | Maricá | | |

Managerial career
- 2022–2023: São Gonçalo EC
- 2025: Resende U20
- 2026–: Resende
- * Club domestic league appearances and goals

Arthur Pedro de Oliveira Barroso (born 19 December 1989), known as Arthur Barroso or just Arthur, is a Brazilian football coach and former player who played as a goalkeeper. He is the current head coach of Resende.

== Career ==
Revealed by Resende, he played for the club for 11 seasons, being one of the main players in its history. He became famous nationally by scoring an equalizing goal in the last minute in the final of the 2014 Copa Rio against Madureira, which was essential for the competition title. He would become champion again in 2015, and later played for URT, Democrata-GV, Tupynambás, Sertãozinho and Maricá FC. After retiring, Arthur was coach of São Gonçalo EC in the Campeonato Carioca Série B1.

== Honours ==
Resende

- Copa Rio: 2014, 2015
