= Tigre (footballer) =

Brazilian former footballer and goalkeeper (born 1986)

Personal information
- Full name: Vanderson Luiz Rodrigues dos Santos
- Date of birth: 25 January 1986 (age 40)
- Place of birth: Salvador, Bahia, Brazil
- Height: 1.90 m (6 ft 3 in)
- Position: Goalkeeper

Senior career*
Years	Team	Apps	(Gls)
2002–2003	Atlético de Alagoinhas		
2008–2009	Madre de Deus		
2010	Feirense		
2010	Fluminense de Feira		
2011	Camaçari		
2012–2013	Jacuipense		
2013–2014	Galicia		
2014	Jacobina		
2015–2018	Juazeirense		
2015	→ Atlético de Alagoinhas (loan)		
2018–2019	Hercílio Luz		
2020	Petrolina		
2022	Juazeirense		
- * Club domestic league appearances and goals as of 21 June 2026

Vanderson Luiz Rodrigues dos Santos (born 25 January 1986), known simply as Tigre (Portuguese for "Tiger"), is a Brazilian former professional footballer who played as a goalkeeper.

== Club career ==
=== Early career ===
He is 1.90 m (6 ft 3 in) tall and weighs approximately 220 lbs (100 kg). While playing for Atlético de Alagoinhas, Tigre became known for scoring goals from penalties.

=== Later career ===
In 2015, Tigre played for Atlético de Alagoinhas (on loan) and Juazeirense.He continued his career with Hercílio Luz in 2018, Petrolina in 2020, and Juazeirense again in 2022.
