= Erich Burgener =

Swiss footballer (born 1951)

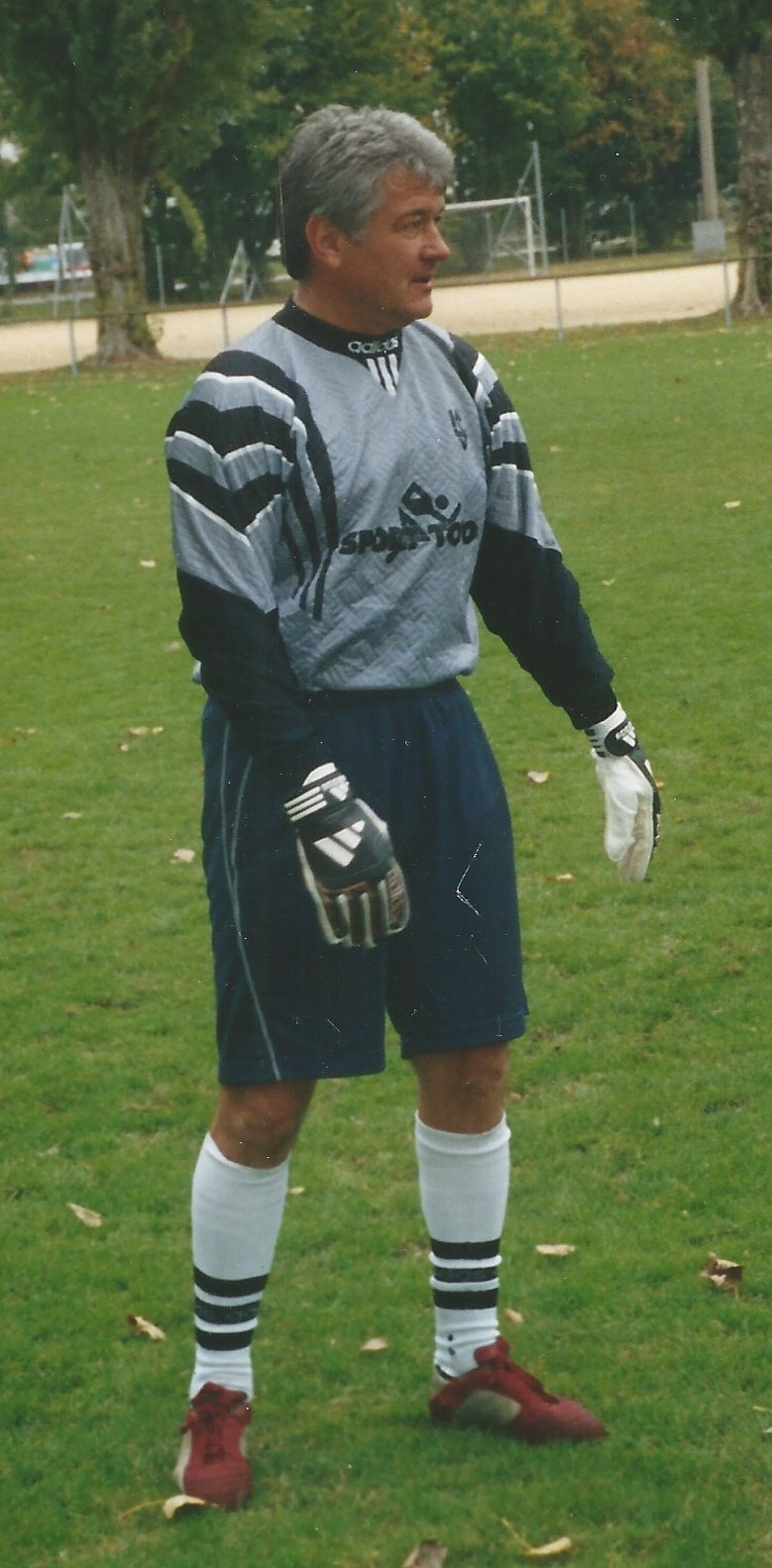

Personal information
- Full name: Erich Burgener
- Date of birth: 15 February 1951 (age 75)
- Place of birth: Raron, Switzerland
- Height: 1.84 m (6 ft 0 in)
- Position: Goalkeeper

Senior career*
Years	Team	Apps	(Gls)
1969–1970	FC Raron	?	(?)
1970–1981	Lausanne	286	(1)
1981–1987	Servette FC	140	(0)

International career
1973–1986	Switzerland	64	(0)
- * Club domestic league appearances and goals

Erich Burgener (born 15 February 1951) is a retired football goalkeeper.

During his club career, Burgener played for FC Raron, Lausanne and Servette FC. He played 64 times for the Switzerland national team.

== See also ==
- List of goalscoring goalkeepers
