= Rui Riça =

Portuguese footballer

Personal information
- Full name: Rui Fernando da Costa Riça
- Date of birth: 6 January 1978 (age 48)
- Place of birth: Chaves, Portugal
- Height: 1.85 m (6 ft 1 in)
- Positions: Goalkeeper; defender

Youth career
- 1989–1997: Chaves

Senior career*
Years	Team	Apps	(Gls)
1997–1998	Chaves	0	(0)
1998	Ourense	0	(0)
1999–2007	Chaves	112	(1)
2007–2009	Vizela	54	(0)
2009–2010	Trofense	16	(1)
2010	Belenenses	3	(0)
2011–2012	Penafiel	11	(0)
2014–2016	Vila Real	45	(0)
2016–2018	Montalegre	7	(0)
- * Club domestic league appearances and goals

Rui Fernando da Costa Riça, known as Rui Riça (born 6 January 1978) is a Portuguese former football player. He was mainly a goalkeeper, but occasionally played as a defender and scored in those games.

== Career ==
Rui Riça made his professional debut in the Segunda Liga for Chaves on 2 October 1999 in a game against Sporting Covilhã.
