= Wilhelm Huxhorn =

German footballer

Personal information
- Date of birth: 20 September 1955
- Place of birth: Pfungstadt, West Germany
- Date of death: 15 April 2010 (aged 54)
- Height: 1.87 m (6 ft 1 1/2 in)
- Position: Goalkeeper

Youth career
- –1981: Germania Pfungstadt
- 1981–1984: SV Darmstadt 98

Senior career*
Years	Team	Apps	(Gls)
1984–1993	SV Darmstadt 98	214	(1)
- * Club domestic league appearances and goals

Wilhelm Huxhorn (German pronunciation: [ˈhʊks.hɔʁn]; 20 September 1955, in Pfungstadt – 15 April 2010) was a German goalkeeper and record holder. He played 221 matches for SV Darmstadt 98. In 1985, he scored a goal from 102 metres (111.55 yd) away which earned him an entry in the Book of Records.

He died after years of struggle of leukemia.
