= Albert Uytenbogaardt =

South African soccer player (1930–2024)

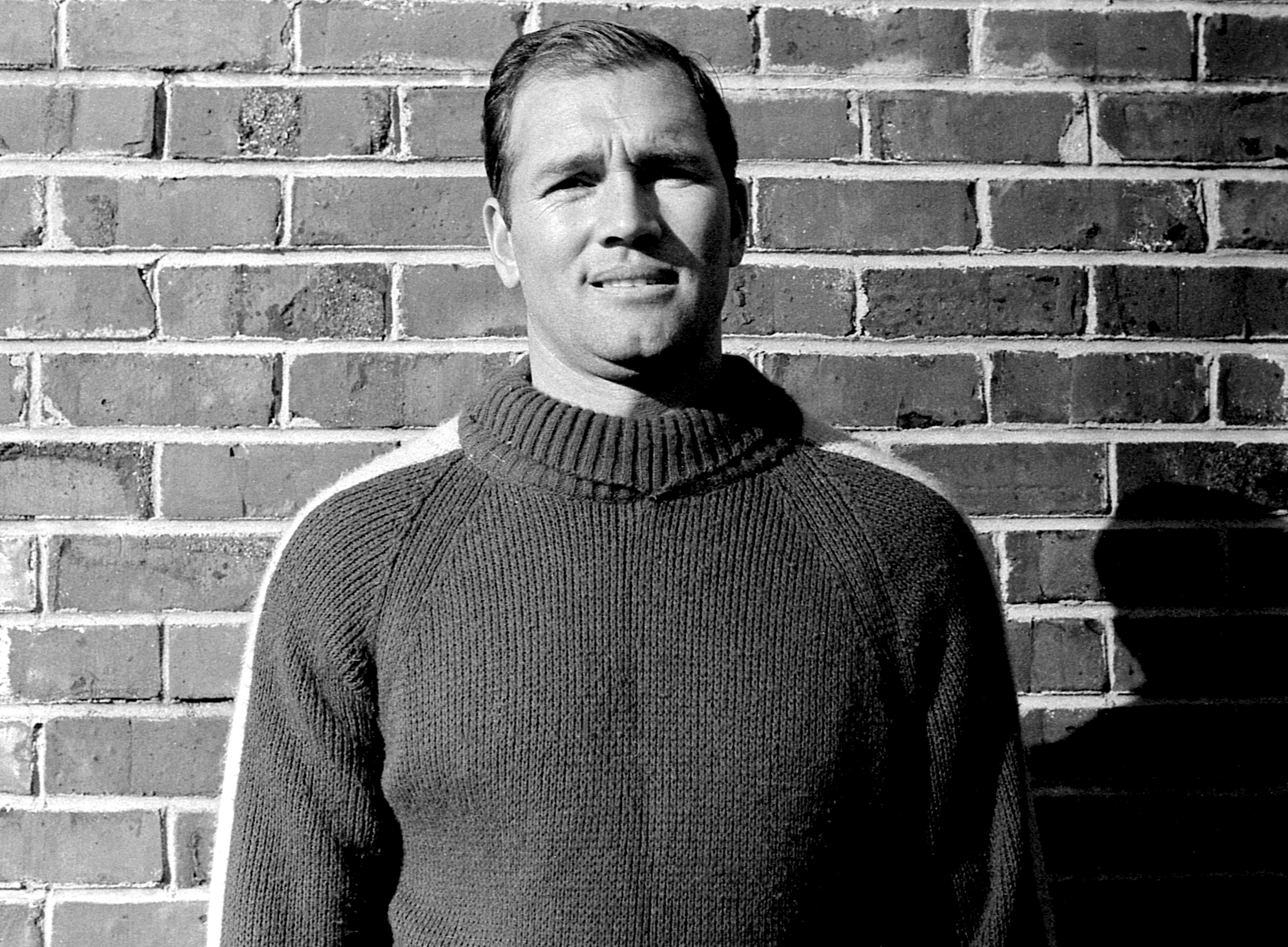
- Albert Uytenbogaardt photographed in 1968

Personal information
- Full name: Albert George Uytenbogaardt
- Date of birth: 5 March 1930
- Place of birth: Cape Town, South Africa
- Date of death: 25 October 2024 (aged 94)
- Position: Goalkeeper

Senior career*
Years	Team	Apps	(Gls)
1947–1948	Tramway		
1948–1953	Charlton Athletic	6	(0)
1954–1961	Tramway		
1962	Hellenic		
1963–1965	Cape Town City	56	(0)
1966–1968	Tramway		

International career
1955–1957	South Africa		
- * Club domestic league appearances and goals

Albert George Uytenbogaardt (5 March 1930 – 25 October 2024) was a South African footballer who played as a goalkeeper.

Uytenbogaardt moved to England and signed for Charlton Athletic in 1948. He made his senior debut on 18 December 1948 in a 4–1 home win against Stoke City. He mainly served as backup to established first choice keeper Sam Bartram, and his first team opportunities were severely limited. He made six Football League appearances in five seasons at the club, but is notably also credited with scoring a goal for the club in a reserve team game. He later returned to his home country to play for Cape Town City.

Uytenbogaardt also represented the South African national team from 1955 to 1957.

Uytenbogaardt died on 25 October 2024, at the age of 94.
