= Guy Hubart =

Belgian footballer

Personal information
- Date of birth: 23 February 1960 (age 66)
- Place of birth: Huy, Belgium
- Position: Goalkeeper

Senior career*
Years	Team	Apps	(Gls)
1979–1986	RFC de Liège		
1986–1991	Boavista		
1991–1995	Estrela Amadora		
1995–1997	Standard Liège		
- * Club domestic league appearances and goals

Guy Hubart (born 23 February 1960) is a retired Belgian football goalkeeper.

He played for the Liège clubs RFC and Standard, and in between enjoyed a nine-year spell in Portugal. On 29 December 1994, he scored Estrela Amadora's equalizer in a 1–1 league match against GD Chaves.
