= 1999 Copa Libertadores finals =

- Event: 1999 Copa Toyota Libertadores
Deportivo Cali	Palmeiras
(Colombia)	(Brazil)
2	2
- on aggregate Palmeiras won 4–3 on penalties

First leg
Deportivo Cali	Palmeiras
1	0
- Date: 2 June 1999
- Venue: Estadio Olímpico Pascual Guerrero, Cali
- Referee: Mario Sánchez

Second leg
Palmeiras	Deportivo Cali
2	1
- Date: 16 June 1999
- Venue: Estádio Palestra Itália, São Paulo
- Referee: Ubaldo Aquino
- Attendance: 32,000

The 1999 Copa Libertadores final was a two-legged football match-up to determine the 1999 Copa Libertadores champion. It was contested by Brazilian club Palmeiras and Colombian club Deportivo Cali. The first leg was played at Estadio Olímpico Pascual Guerrero in Cali while the second leg was played at Estádio Palestra Itália (also known as "Parque Antarctica") of São Paulo.

After the series finished in a 2–2 tie on aggregate, Palmeiras was crowned champion by penalty shoot-out.

== Qualified teams ==
Team	Previous finals appearances (bold indicates winners)
(Colombia) Deportivo Cali	1978
(Brazil) Palmeiras	1961, 1968

== Venues ==
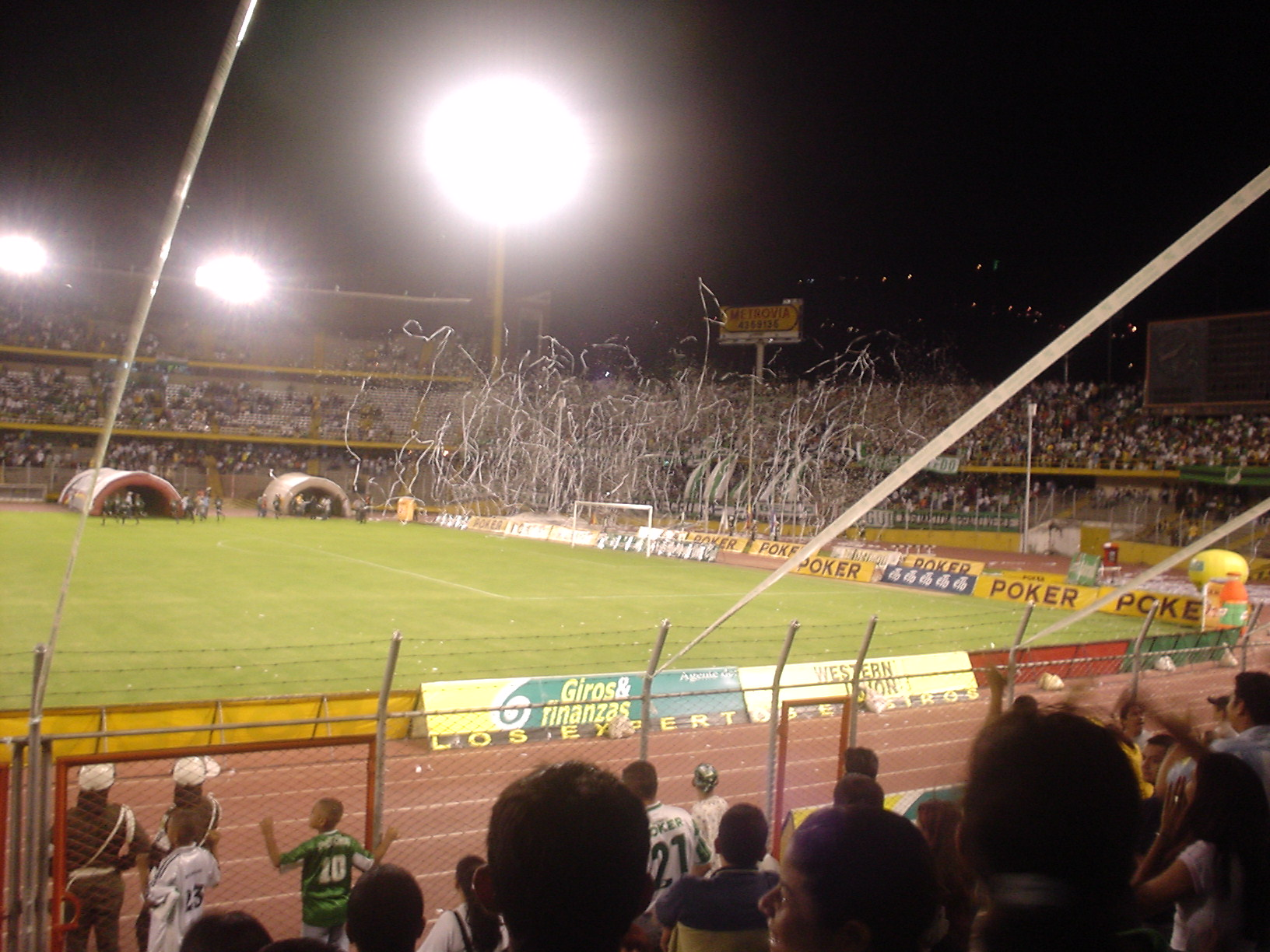
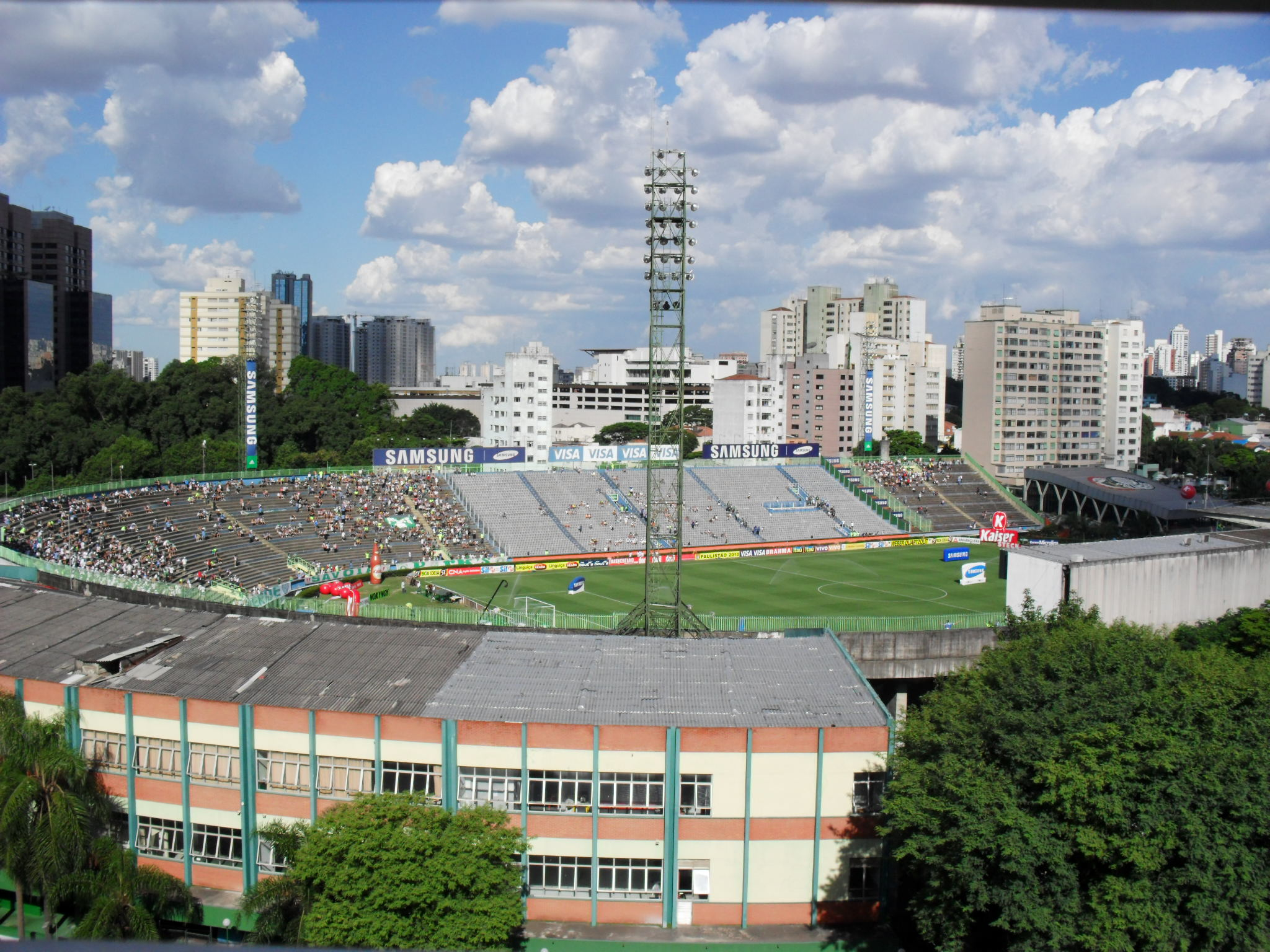
Pascual Guerrero and Palestra Itália, venues for the finals

== Route to the finals ==
Palmeiras			Deportivo Cali	
(Brazil) Vasco da Gama; H **1–1**	Oséas 41'	**Round of 16**; First leg	(Chile) Colo-Colo; H **2–0**	Bonilla 3'; Zapata 12' (pen.)
(Brazil) Vasco da Gama; A **4–2**	Paulo Nunes 28'; Alex 31', 48'; Arce 50'	Second leg	(Chile) Colo-Colo; A **0–1**	
(Brazil) Corinthians; H **2–0**	Oséas 19'; Rogério 67'	**Quarterfinals**; First leg	(Uruguay) Bella Vista; H **2–1**	Zapata 40'; Bonilla 67'
(Brazil) Corinthians; A **0–2** (p. 4–2)		Second leg	(Uruguay) Bella Vista; A **1–1**	Bonilla 79'
(Argentina) River Plate; A **0–1**		**Semifinals**; First leg	(Paraguay) Cerro Porteño; H **4–0**	Castillo 35'; Candelo 46'; Córdoba 86'; Pérez 88'
(Argentina) River Plate; H **3–0**	Alex 16', 87'; Roque Junior 18'	Second leg	(Paraguay) Cerro Porteño; A **2–3**	Candelo 27'; Bonilla 89'

== Final summary ==
=== First leg ===
2 June 1999
20:10 (UTC-5)

Deportivo Cali (Colombia)	1–0	(Brazil) Palmeiras
Bonilla 42'	(Report)

Estadio Olímpico Pascual Guerrero, Cali
Attendance: 46,000
Referee: Mario Sánchez (Chile)

**Deportivo Cali**	**Palmeiras**

GK	1	(Venezuela) Rafael Dudamel
DF	14	(Colombia) John Pérez
DF	23	(Colombia) Mario Yepes	(yellow card) 58'
DF	25	(Colombia) Andrés Mosquera
DF	20	(Colombia) Gerardo Bedoya
MF	4	(Colombia) Alexander Viveros
MF	21	(Colombia) Martín Zapata (c)
MF	17	(Colombia) Mayer Candelo
FW	11	(Colombia) Geovanny Córdoba
FW	9	(Colombia) Víctor Bonilla		(substituted off) 73'
FW	7	(Colombia) Carlos Castillo		(substituted off) 80'
Substitutes:
GK	22	(Colombia) Fabián Domínguez
	13	(Colombia) Miguel Marrero	(yellow card) 80'	(substituted on) 73'
MF	6	(Colombia) Herman Gaviria
	5	(Colombia) Manuel Valencia
	24	(Colombia) Wilson Cano
	3	(Colombia) Freddy Hurtado
	16	(Colombia) Emiliano Rey		(substituted on) 80'
Manager:
(Colombia) José Hernández

GK	12	(Brazil) Marcos
DF	2	(Paraguay) Francisco Arce	(yellow card) 78'
DF	3	(Brazil) Junior Baiano
DF	5	(Brazil) Roque Junior
DF	6	(Brazil) Júnior
MF	8	(Brazil) César Sampaio (c)
MF	16	(Brazil) Rogério	(yellow card) 19'
MF	10	(Brazil) Alex		(substituted off) 71'
MF	11	(Brazil) Zinho	(yellow card) 51'	(substituted off) 83'
FW	7	(Brazil) Paulo Nunes
FW	9	(Brazil) Oséas		(substituted off) 47'
Substitutes:
GK	22	(Brazil) Sérgio
MF	25	(Brazil) Galeano		(substituted on) 83'
DF	23	(Brazil) Agnaldo
DF	21	(Brazil) Rubens Júnior
MF	18	(Brazil) Jackson
FW	24	(Brazil) Euller		(substituted on) 71'
MF	17	(Brazil) Evair		(substituted on) 47'
Manager:
(Brazil) Luiz Felipe Scolari

Assistant referees:
(Chile) Juan Riquelme
(Chile) Héctor Poblete
Fourth official:
(Chile) Guido Aros

=== Second leg ===
June 16, 1999
21:40 (UTC-3)

Palmeiras (Brazil)	2–1	(Colombia) Deportivo Cali
Evair 65' (pen.); Oséas 76'	(Report)	Zapata 70' (pen.)
Penalties
Zinho (penalty missed); Junior Baiano (penalty scored); Roque Junior (penalty scored); Rogério (penalty scored); Euller (penalty scored)	4–3	(penalty scored) Dudamel; (penalty scored) Gaviria; (penalty scored) Yepes; (penalty missed) Bedoya; (penalty missed) Zapata

Parque Antartica, São Paulo
Attendance: 32,000
Referee: Ubaldo Aquino (Paraguay)

**Palmeiras**	**Deportivo Cali**

GK	12	(Brazil) Marcos
DF	2	(Paraguay) Francisco Arce		(substituted off) 57'
DF	3	(Brazil) Junior Baiano	(yellow card) 55'
DF	5	(Brazil) Roque Junior
DF	6	(Brazil) Júnior
MF	8	(Brazil) César Sampaio (c)
MF	16	(Brazil) Rogério
MF	10	(Brazil) Alex	(yellow card) 39'	(substituted off) 75'
MF	11	(Brazil) Zinho	(yellow card) 68'
FW	7	(Brazil) Paulo Nunes
FW	9	(Brazil) Oséas
Substitutes:
GK	22	(Brazil) Sérgio
MF	17	(Brazil) Evair	(red card) 90+5'	(substituted on) 57'
DF	4	(Brazil) Cléber
FW	24	(Brazil) Euller		(substituted on) 75'
MF	18	(Brazil) Jackson
DF	21	(Brazil) Rubens Júnior
MF	25	(Brazil) Galeano
Manager:
(Brazil) Luiz Felipe Scolari

GK	1	(Venezuela) Rafael Dudamel	(yellow card) 89'
DF	14	(Colombia) John Pérez		(substituted off) 84'
DF	23	(Colombia) Mario Yepes
DF	25	(Colombia) Andrés Mosquera	(red card) 79'
DF	20	(Colombia) Gerardo Bedoya	(yellow card) 61'
MF	4	(Colombia) Alexander Viveros
MF	21	(Colombia) Martín Zapata (c)
MF	17	(Colombia) Mayer Candelo		(substituted off) 61'
MF	8	(Colombia) Arley Betancourt	(yellow card) 35'
FW	9	(Colombia) Víctor Bonilla
FW	11	(Colombia) Geovanny Córdoba	(yellow card) 22'	(substituted off) 80'
Substitutes:
GK	22	(Colombia) Fabián Domínguez
	3	(Colombia) Freddy Hurtado	(yellow card) 73'	(substituted on) 61'
	5	(Colombia) Manuel Valencia		(substituted on) 80'
MF	6	(Colombia) Herman Gaviria		(substituted on) 84'
FW	7	(Colombia) Carlos Castillo
	13	(Colombia) Miguel Marrero
	24	(Colombia) Wilson Cano
Manager:
(Colombia) José Hernández

Assistant referees:
(Paraguay) Miguel Giacomuzzi
(Paraguay) Néstor González
Fourth official:
(Paraguay) Robert Troxler
