= 2000 Copa Libertadores finals =

- Event: 2000 Copa Libertadores
Boca Juniors	Palmeiras
(Argentina)	(Brazil)
2	2
- on aggregate; Boca Juniors won 4–2 on penalties

First leg
Boca Juniors	Palmeiras
2	2
- Date: 14 June 2000
- Venue: La Bombonera, Buenos Aires
- Referee: Gustavo Méndez
- Attendance: 50,580

Second leg
Palmeiras	Boca Juniors
0	0
- Date: 21 June 2000
- Venue: Morumbi, São Paulo
- Referee: Epifanio González
- Attendance: 75,000

The 2000 Copa Libertadores final was a two-legged football match-up to determine the 2000 Copa Libertadores champion. It was contested by Argentine club Boca Juniors and Brazilian club Palmeiras. The first leg of the tie was played on 14 June at Boca Juniors' venue, La Bombonera, with the second leg played on 21 June at Estádio do Morumbi in São Paulo.

After both matches finished tied, Boca Juniors won the Cup by penalty shoot-out.

== Qualified teams ==
Team	Previous finals app.
(Argentina) Boca Juniors	1963, **1977**, **1978**, 1979
(Brazil) Palmeiras	1961, 1968, **1999**

Bold indicates winning years

== Venues ==
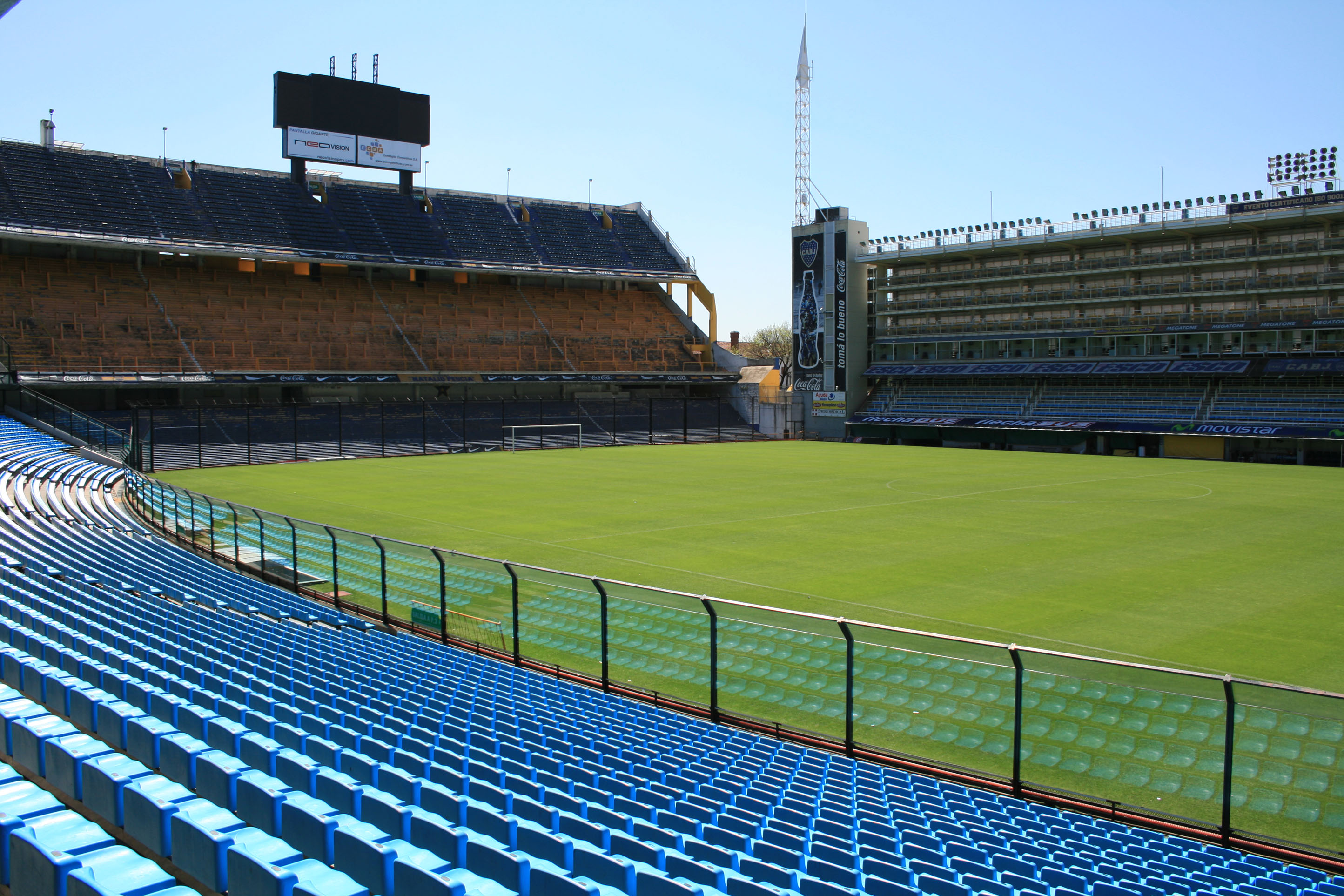
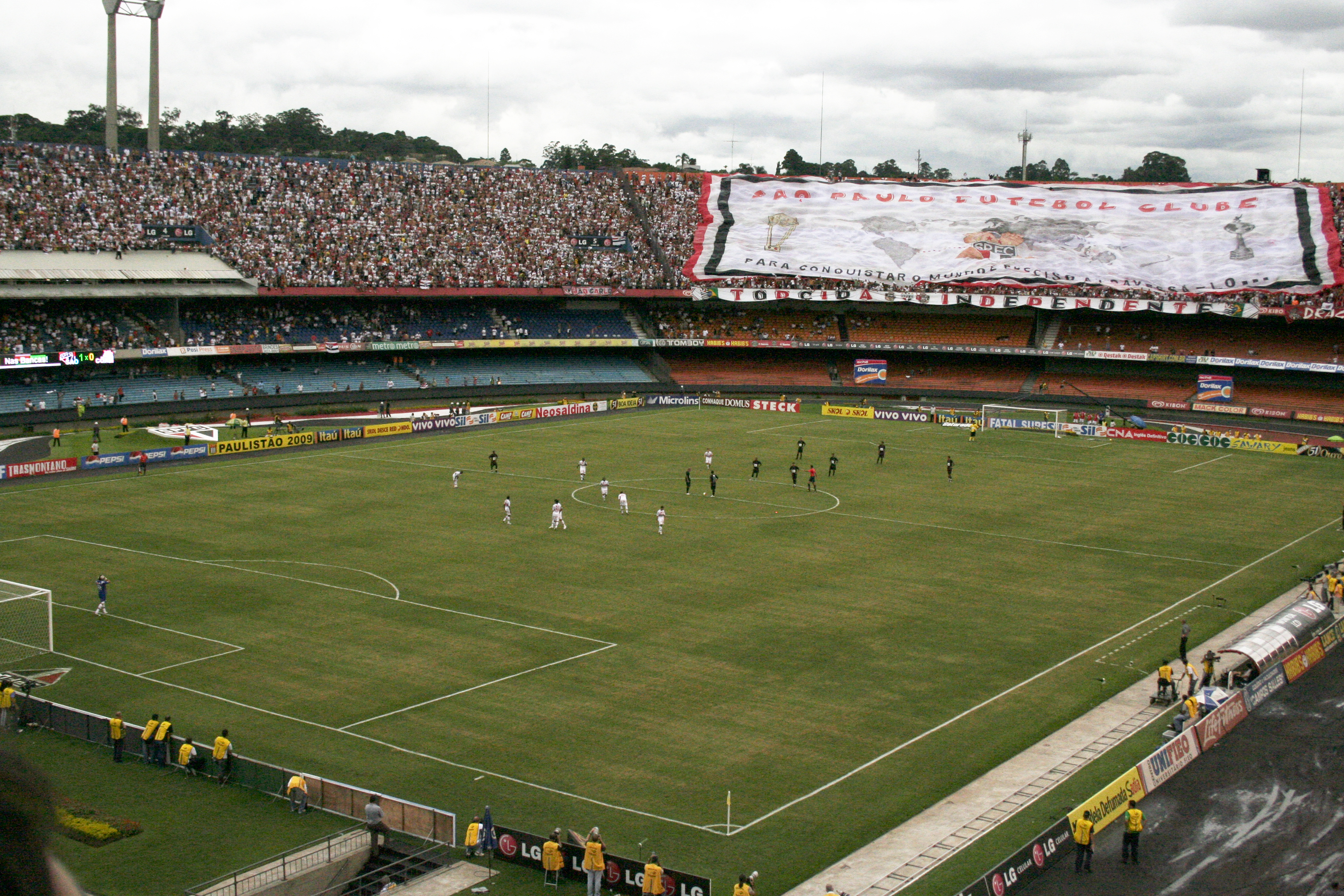
La Bombonera (left) and Estádio do Morumbi, venues for the finals

== Route to the finals ==
Palmeiras			Boca Juniors	
(Uruguay) Peñarol; A **0–2**		**Round of 16**; First leg	(Ecuador) El Nacional; A **0–0**	
(Uruguay) Peñarol; H **3–1** (p. 3–2)	Neném 26'; Marcelo Ramos 43', 56'	Second leg	(Ecuador) El Nacional; H **5–3**	Riquelme 3'; Moreno 10'; Gustavo B.S. 22'; Arruabarrena 26'; Bermúdez 42'
(Mexico) Atlas; A **2–0**	Pena 14'; Euller 79'	**Quarterfinals**; First leg	(Argentina) River Plate; A **1–2**	Riquelme 30'
(Mexico) Atlas; H **3–2**	Rogério 17'; Marcelo Ramos 66'; Taddei 85'	Second leg	(Argentina) River Plate; H **3–0**	Delgado 59'; Riquelme 79' (pen.); Palermo 94'
(Brazil) Corinthians; A **3–4**	Júnior 39'; Alex 75'; Euller 82'	**Semifinals**; First leg	(Mexico) América; H **4–1**	Arruabarrena 9'; Barijho 11', 51'; Marchant 21'
(Brazil) Corinthians; H **3–2** (p. 5–4)	Euller 34'; Alex 59'; Galeano 70'	Second leg	(Mexico) América; A **1–3**	Samuel 83'

== Final summary ==
=== First leg ===
14 June 2000
21:40 (UTC−03:00)
First leg

Boca Juniors (Argentina)	2–2	(Brazil) Palmeiras
Arruabarrena 22', 61'	(Report)	Pena 43'; Euller 63'

La Bombonera, Buenos Aires
Attendance: 50,580
Referee: Gustavo Méndez (Uruguay)

**Boca Juniors**	**Palmeiras**

GK	1	(Colombia) Óscar Córdoba
RB	13	(Argentina) Cristian Traverso	(yellow card) 65'
CB	2	(Colombia) Jorge Bermúdez (c)
CB	22	(Argentina) Sebastián Battaglia
LB	6	(Argentina) Walter Samuel
RM	4	(Argentina) Hugo Ibarra
CM	17	(Argentina) Gustavo Barros Schelotto	(yellow card) 88'	(substituted off) 65'
LM	3	(Argentina) Rodolfo Arruabarrena
AM	21	(Argentina) Christian Giménez	(yellow card) 8'	(substituted off) 46'
AM	10	(Argentina) Juan Román Riquelme	(yellow card) 59'
CF	20	(Argentina) Antonio Barijho		(substituted off) 46'
Substitutes:
GK	12	(Argentina) Roberto Abbondanzieri
DF	14	(Argentina) Nicolás Burdisso
DF	15	(Argentina) Aníbal Matellán
MF	18	(Argentina) José Basualdo
MF	19	(Argentina) César La Paglia		(substituted on) 65'
FW	7	(Argentina) Guillermo Barros Schelotto		(substituted on) 46'
FW	9	(Argentina) Martín Palermo		(substituted on) 46'
Manager:
(Argentina) Carlos Bianchi

GK	1	(Brazil) Marcos
RB	13	(Brazil) Neném	(yellow card) 64'
CB	3	(Brazil) Argel	(yellow card) 60'
CB	5	(Brazil) Roque Júnior	(yellow card) 5'
LB	6	(Brazil) Júnior
CM	25	(Brazil) Galeano
CM	8	(Brazil) César Sampaio (c)
RW	16	(Brazil) Rogério
AM	10	(Brazil) Alex		(substituted off) 87'
LW	17	(Brazil) Pena		(substituted off) 62'
CF	7	(Brazil) Euller		(substituted off) 85'
Substitutes:
GK	12	(Brazil) Sérgio
DF	4	(Brazil) Agnaldo Liz
DF	15	(Brazil) Tiago Silva		(substituted on) 87'
MF	19	(Brazil) Fernando
FW	2	(Brazil) Luiz Cláudio
FW	9	(Colombia) Faustino Asprilla		(substituted on) 85'
FW	18	(Brazil) Marcelo Ramos		(substituted on) 62'
Manager:
(Brazil) Luiz Felipe Scolari

Assistant referees:
William Martínez (Uruguay)
Rubén Meneses (Uruguay)
Fourth official:
Daniel Bello (Uruguay)

=== Second leg ===
21 June 2000
21:40 (UTC−03:00)
Second leg

Palmeiras (Brazil)	0–0	(Argentina) Boca Juniors
	(Report)
Penalties
Alex (penalty scored); Asprilla (penalty missed); Roque Júnior (penalty missed); Rogério (penalty scored)	2–4	(penalty scored) Guillermo B.S.; (penalty scored) Riquelme; (penalty scored) Palermo; (penalty scored) Bermúdez

Estádio do Morumbi, São Paulo
Attendance: 75,000
Referee: Epifanio González (Paraguay)

**Palmeiras**	**Boca Juniors**

GK	1	(Brazil) Marcos
RB	16	(Brazil) Rogério
CB	3	(Brazil) Argel	(yellow card) 77'
CB	5	(Brazil) Roque Júnior
LB	6	(Brazil) Júnior
CM	25	(Brazil) Galeano
CM	8	(Brazil) César Sampaio (c)	(yellow card) 54'
RW	18	(Brazil) Marcelo Ramos		(substituted off) 35'
AM	10	(Brazil) Alex
LW	17	(Brazil) Pena		(substituted off) 61'
CF	7	(Brazil) Euller
Substitutes:
GK	12	(Brazil) Sérgio
DF	4	(Brazil) Agnaldo Liz
DF	13	(Brazil) Neném
DF	15	(Brazil) Tiago Silva
MF	19	(Brazil) Fernando
FW	9	(Colombia) Faustino Asprilla		(substituted on) 35'
FW	11	(Brazil) Basílio		(substituted on) 61'
Manager:
(Brazil) Luiz Felipe Scolari

GK	1	(Colombia) Óscar Córdoba
RB	13	(Argentina) Cristian Traverso
CB	2	(Colombia) Jorge Bermúdez (c)	(yellow card) 76'
CB	22	(Argentina) Sebastián Battaglia
LB	6	(Argentina) Walter Samuel
CM	4	(Argentina) Hugo Ibarra
CM	18	(Argentina) José Basualdo
CM	3	(Argentina) Rodolfo Arruabarrena
AM	10	(Argentina) Juan Román Riquelme
CF	9	(Argentina) Martín Palermo
CF	7	(Argentina) Guillermo Barros Schelotto	(yellow card) 65'
Substitutes:
GK	12	(Argentina) Roberto Abbondanzieri
DF	14	(Argentina) Nicolás Burdisso
DF	15	(Argentina) Aníbal Matellán
MF	17	(Argentina) Gustavo Barros Schelotto
MF	19	(Argentina) César La Paglia
FW	20	(Argentina) Antonio Barijho
FW	21	(Argentina) Christian Giménez
Manager:
(Argentina) Carlos Bianchi

Assistant referees:
Celestino Galván (Paraguay)
Miguel Ángel Giacomuzzi (Paraguay)
Fourth official:
Ricardo Grance (Paraguay)
