= 2000 São Paulo FC season =

São Paulo
2000 season
- Chairman: Paulo Amaral Vasconcelos
- Manager: Levir Culpi
- Campeonato Brasileiro: Round of 16
- Torneio Rio-São Paulo: Semi-finals
- Campeonato Paulista: Champions (20th title)
- Copa do Brasil: Runners-up
- Copa dos Campeões: Semi-finals
- Copa Mercosur: Group stage
- Top goalscorer: League: Marcelo Ramos (12); All: França (40)
- Highest home attendance: 32,009 ( v Palmeiras in the Campeonato Brasileiro)
- Lowest home attendance: 2,607 ( v América-MG in the Campeonato Brasileiro)

The 2000 season was São Paulo's 71st season since club's existence. That year the club won state league of São Paulo, the Campeonato Paulista for the twentieth time after two legs of final against rival Santos thanks to a win in the first match by 1–0 and a 2–2 draw in the second leg, both played in Morumbi Stadium. In Copa do Brasil The Dearest reaches the finals for the first time but couldn't raise the trophy due to a defeat in second match when Geovanni, midfielder of Cruzeiro, scored a free kick goal on the last minute and gave to opponent the title. Another highlighting performances were in Torneio Rio-São Paulo and Copa dos Campeões when São Paulo fell in semi-finals. Playing the continental cup Copa Mercosur they not took a place in second stage ending in second position on group stage. In national league Campeonato Brasileiro, the team was defeated by rival Palmeiras in round of 16 by two results (1–1 Away; 1–2 Home).

== Scorers ==
Position	Nation	Playing position	Name	Torneio Rio-São Paulo	Campeonato Paulista	Copa do Brasil	Copa dos Campeões	Copa Mercosur	Copa João Havelange	Others	Total
1	(Brazil)	FW	França	5	18	5	0	3	8	1	40
2	(Brazil)	MF	Marcelinho Paraíba	0	7	4	3	0	0	1	15
3	(Brazil)	FW	Marcelo Ramos	0	0	0	0	1	12	0	13
4	(Brazil)	FW	Edu	0	6	4	0	0	0	0	10
5	(Brazil)	FW	Evair	3	2	3	0	0	1	0	9
6	(Brazil)	GK	Rogério Ceni	0	2	1	0	0	3	1	7
=	(Brazil)	FW	Sandro Hiroshi	0	0	1	0	2	4	0	7
=	(Brazil)	MF	Souza	2	0	0	0	3	1	1	7
7	(Brazil)	MF	Raí	0	1	3	0	0	0	2	6
=	(Brazil)	DF	Rogério Pinheiro	0	0	1	1	0	4	0	6
8	(Brazil)	MF	Fábio Simplício	0	0	0	0	0	5	0	5
=	(Brazil)	DF	Gustavo Nery	0	0	0	0	2	3	0	5
9	(Brazil)	DF	Wilson	0	2	0	0	0	1	1	4
10	(Brazil)	MF	Beto	0	0	0	0	0	3	0	3
=	(Brazil)	MF	Carlos Miguel	1	0	1	0	0	1	0	3
=	(Brazil)	DF	Edmílson	1	1	0	0	0	0	1	3
11	(Brazil)	DF	Álvaro	0	2	0	0	0	0	0	2
=	(Brazil)	MF	Fabiano	0	0	1	0	0	1	0	2
=	(Brazil)	DF	Fábio Aurélio	0	1	1	0	0	0	0	2
=	(Brazil)	FW	Ilan	0	0	0	1	0	1	0	2
=	(Brazil)	MF	Vágner	0	1	1	0	0	0	0	2
12	(Brazil)	DF	Alemão	0	0	0	0	1	0	0	1
=	(Brazil)	DF	Belletti	1	0	0	0	0	0	0	1
=	(Brazil)	MF	Júlio Baptista	0	0	0	0	1	0	0	1
=	(Chile)	MF	Claudio Maldonado	0	0	1	0	0	0	0	1
/	/	/	Own Goals	1	0	1	0	0	0	0	2
			Total	14	45	28	5	13	48	8	161

=== Overall ===
Games played	78 (8 Torneio Rio-São Paulo, 20 Campeonato Paulista, 12 Copa do Brasil, 4 Copa dos Campeões, 6 Copa Mercosur, 26 Campeonato Brasileiro, 2 Friendly match)
Games won	42 (4 Torneio Rio-São Paulo, 14 Campeonato Paulista, 8 Copa do Brasil, 2 Copa dos Campeões, 2 Copa Mercosur, 10 Campeonato Brasileiro, 2 Friendly match)
Games drawn	18 (0 Torneio Rio-São Paulo, 4 Campeonato Paulista, 2 Copa do Brasil, 1 Copa dos Campeões, 1 Copa Mercosur, 10 Campeonato Brasileiro, 0 Friendly match)
Games lost	18 (4 Torneio Rio-São Paulo, 2 Campeonato Paulista, 2 Copa do Brasil, 1 Copa dos Campeões, 3 Copa Mercosur, 6 Campeonato Brasileiro, 0 Friendly match)
Goals scored	161
Goals conceded	110
Goal difference	+51
Best result	5–1 (H) v Uralan Elista – Friendly match – 2000.1.18; 5–1 (H) v Rio Branco – Campeonato Paulista – 2000.3.22
Worst result	1–5 (A) v Vitória – Campeonato Brasileiro – 2000.10.7
Top scorer	França (40)

Source: São Paulo FC

== Friendlies ==
=== Constantino Cury International Tournament ===
15 January International	São Paulo (Brazil)	3–2	(Brazil) Avaí	São Paulo
00:00 (UTC-3)	Marcelinho Paraíba 17'; Raí 38'; Wilson 73'		Marquinhos 13', 16'	Stadium: Morumbi; Referee: Olten Ayres de Abreu / Romildo Corrêa

18 January International	São Paulo (Brazil)	5–1	(Russia) Uralan Elista	São Paulo
00:00 (UTC-3)	Edmílson 29'; França 37'; Raí 54'; Rogério Ceni 79'; Souza 90'		Semochko 47'	Stadium: Morumbi; Referee: Alfredo Loebeling

== Official competitions ==
=== Torneio Rio-São Paulo ===
23 January Group A	Flamengo	1–2	São Paulo	Rio de Janeiro
00:00 (UTC-3)	Iranildo 35'		França 3'; Edmílson 9'	Stadium: Maracanã; Referee: Sílvio César Talarico

26 January Group A	São Paulo	5–2	Santos	São Paulo
00:00 (UTC-3)	França 20', 22', 47'; Evair 45', 64'		Dodô 33' (pen.); Caio 90+1'	Stadium: Morumbi; Attendance: 3,070; Referee: Léo Feldman

29 January Group A	Botafogo	2–3	São Paulo	Rio de Janeiro
00:00 (UTC-3)	Rodrigo 10'; Sérgio Manoel 78' (pen.)		Jorge Luís 2' (o.g.); França 8'; Evair 30'	Stadium: Maracanã; Referee: Paulo César de Oliveira

2 February Group A	Santos	0–1	São Paulo	Santos
00:00 (UTC-3)			Carlos Miguel 80'	Stadium: Vila Belmiro; Attendance: 9,213; Referee: Samir Yarak

6 February Group A	São Paulo	2–5	Flamengo	São Paulo
00:00 (UTC-3)	Souza 5', 8'		Rodrigo Mendes 9'; Adriano 46'; Leandro Machado 50', 78'; Iranildo 56'	Stadium: Morumbi; Referee: Ubiraci Damásio de Oliveira

12 February Group A	São Paulo	0–2	Botafogo	São Paulo
00:00 (UTC-3)			Zé Carlos 53'; Magrão 54'	Stadium: Morumbi; Referee: Wagner Tardelli

19 February Semifinals	São Paulo	0–3	Vasco da Gama	São Paulo
00:00 (UTC-3)			Gilberto 44'; Dedé 59'; Romário 76' (pen.)	Stadium: Morumbi; Referee: Cláudio Vinícius Cerdeira

23 February Semifinals	Vasco da Gama	2–1 (5–1 agg.)	São Paulo	Rio de Janeiro
00:00 (UTC-3)	Romário 8', 86'		Belletti 2'	Stadium: São Januário; Referee: Romildo Correa

==== Record ====
Final Position	Points	Matches	Wins	Draws	Losses	Goals For	Goals Away	Win%
4th	12	8	4	0	4	14	17	50%

=== Campeonato Paulista ===
8 March Second stage	Botafogo	0–2	São Paulo	Ribeirão Preto
00:00 (UTC-3)			Evair 73'; Raí 80'	Stadium: Santa Cruz; Referee: Sálvio Spinola Fagundes Filho/ Robério Pereira Pires

12 March Second stage	São Paulo	2–1	Palmeiras	São Paulo
00:00 (UTC-3)	Edu 33', 48'			Stadium: Morumbi; Referee: Alfredo Loebeling / Antônio Cláudio Perin

18 March Second stage	União São João	2–2	São Paulo	Araras
00:00 (UTC-3)	Jeda 72'; Júnior Amorim 77'		França 11'; Edmílson 27'	Stadium: Hermínio Ometto; Referee: Cléber Wellington Abade / Anselmo da Costa

22 March Second stage	São Paulo	5–1	Rio Branco	São Paulo
00:00 (UTC-3)	Marcelinho Paraíba 32'; França 35', 59', 89'; Álvaro 90'		Ludemar 57'	Stadium: Morumbi; Referee: Sílvio César Talarico / André Roberto Ferreira Pinto

26 March Second stage	São Paulo	1–0	União Barbarense	São Paulo
00:00 (UTC-3)	França 58'			Stadium: Morumbi; Referee: Paulo César de Oliveira / Élcio Paschoal Borborema

1 April Second stage	Guarani	2–3	São Paulo	Campinas
00:00 (UTC-3)	Gustavo Nery 64', 73'		Fábio Aurélio 17'; Rogério Ceni 51'; Marcelinho Paraíba 59'	Stadium: Brinco de Ouro; Referee: Edílson Pereira de Carvalho/ Robério Pereira Pires

6 April Second stage	São Paulo	4–2	Portuguesa Santista	São Paulo
00:00 (UTC-3)	França 11', 89', 90'; Rogério Ceni 55'		Jorginho 31'; Capitão 88'	Stadium: Morumbi; Referee: Wilson José Seneme / Antônio Cláudio Perin

12 April Second stage	Portuguesa Santista	3–1	São Paulo	Santos
00:00 (UTC-3)	Eliel 17'; Valdir 49'; Marco Antônio 87'		França 31'	Stadium: Ulrico Mursa; Referee: Romildo Corrêa/ Vladimir Vassoler

16 April Second stage	São Paulo	1–0	Guarani	São Paulo
00:00 (UTC-3)	França 77'			Stadium: Morumbi; Referee: Alfredo Loebeling / José Luís dos Santos

22 April Second stage	União Barbarense	1–4	São Paulo	Santa Bárbara d'Oeste
00:00 (UTC-3)	Edinan 11'		Vágner 22'; Marcelinho Paraíba 36'; Evair 73'; Wilson 77'	Stadium: Antônio Guimarães; Referee: Marinho Aldo Silvério / Evandro Silveira

30 April Third stage	São Paulo	1–1	Portuguesa	São Paulo
00:00 (UTC-3)	França 64'		Evandro 58'	Stadium: Morumbi; Referee: Sálvio Spinola Fagundes Filho/ Ilson Honorato dos Santos

7 May Third stage	Guarani	1–3	São Paulo	Campinas
00:00 (UTC-3)	Lindomar 21'		Wilson 8'; Edu 44'; Marcelinho Paraíba 45'	Stadium: Brinco de Ouro; Referee: Romildo Corrêa/ Luciano Calabietto Quilichini

10 May Third stage	São Paulo	1–2	Santos	São Paulo
00:00 (UTC-3)	França 44'		Eduardo Marques 31'; Robert 88'	Stadium: Morumbi; Referee: Paulo César de Oliveira/ Ílson Honorato dos Santos

13 May Third stage	Santos	1–1	São Paulo	Santos
00:00 (UTC-3)	Eduardo Marques 12'		Edu 20'	Stadium: Vila Belmiro; Referee: Sálvio Spinola Fagundes Filho/ Vladimir Vassoler

17 May Third stage	Portuguesa	2–4	São Paulo	São Paulo
00:00 (UTC-3)	Bentinho 46'; Leandro Amaral 66'		França 11', 76', 86'; Marcelinho Paraíba 89'	Stadium: Canindé

20 May Third stage	São Paulo	3–0	Guarani	São Paulo
00:00 (UTC-3)	França 29', 60'; Álvaro 40'			Stadium: Morumbi; Referee: Sálvio Spinola Fagundes Filho/ Ílson Honorato dos Santos

28 May Semifinals	São Paulo	2–1	Corinthians	São Paulo
16:00 (UTC-3)	Marcelinho Paraíba 71', 76'		Marcos Senna 89'	Stadium: Morumbi; Referee: Paulo César de Oliveira / Ílson Honorato dos Santos

3 June Semifinals	Corinthians	0–2 (1–4 agg.)	São Paulo	São Paulo
16:00 (UTC-3)			Edu 35', 83'	Stadium: Morumbi; Referee: Alfredo Loebeling / Luciano Quilichini

10 June Finals	Santos	0–1	São Paulo	São Paulo
16:00 (UTC-3)		(Report) (pt)	França 1'	Stadium: Morumbi; Referee: Paulo César de Oliveira

18 June Finals	São Paulo	2–2 (3–2 agg.)	Santos	São Paulo
16:00 (UTC-3)	Rogério Ceni 39'; Marcelinho Paraíba 68'	(Report) (pt)	Dodô 29'; Rincón 53' (pen.)	Stadium: Morumbi; Referee: Alfredo Loebeling

==== Record ====
Final Position	Points	Matches	Wins	Draws	Losses	Goals For	Goals Away	Win%
1st	46	20	14	4	2	45	22	76%

=== Copa do Brasil ===
5 April Round of 64	Comercial	2–1	São Paulo	Campo Grande
00:00 (UTC-3)	Pedrinho Maradona 80'; Ronaldo Maresi 85'		Raí 63'	Stadium: Morenão; Referee: Cleivaldo Bernardo

19 April Round of 64	São Paulo	3–0 (4–2 agg.)	Comercial	São Paulo
20:30 (UTC-3)	França 9' (pen.), 87'; Edu 30'	(Report) (pt)		Stadium: Morumbi; Referee: Léo Feldman

27 April Round of 32	Sinop	0–4	São Paulo	Sinop
20:40 (UTC-3)		(Report) (pt)	Edu 31'; França 68'; Suliman 89' (o.g.); Evair 90'	Stadium: Gigante do Norte; Referee: Jamir Carlos Garcez

3 May Round of 32	São Paulo	2–0 (6–0 agg.)	Sinop	São Paulo
19:30 (UTC-3)	França 73'; Maldonado 76'	(Report) (pt)		Stadium: Morumbi; Referee: Heber Roberto Lopes

24 May Round of 16	América-RN	1–3	São Paulo	Natal
20:40 (UTC-3)	Ricardo 40' (pen.)	(Report) (pt)	Evair 21', 84'; Rogério Ceni 67'	Stadium: Machadão; Referee: Márcio Rezende de Freitas

31 May Round of 16	São Paulo	3–2 (6–3 agg.)	América-RN	São Paulo
19:30 (UTC-3)	Fábio Aurélio 38'; Evair 73' (pen.); Adaílson 85' (o.g.)	(Report) (pt)	Ricardo 37' (pen.); Válber 90'	Stadium: Morumbi; Referee: Leonardo Gaciba da Silva

24 June Quarterfinals	São Paulo	2–1	Palmeiras	São Paulo
00:00 (UTC-3)	França 12'; Raí 82'	(Report) (pt)	Alex 65' (pen.)	Stadium: Morumbi; Referee: Romildo Correa

27 June Quarterfinals	Palmeiras	2–3 (3–5 agg.)	São Paulo	São Paulo
21:40 (UTC-3)	Rogério 35', 61' (pen.)	(Report) (pt)	Vágner 15'; Raí 49'; Sandro Hiroshi 69'	Stadium: Palestra Itália; Referee: Sálvio Spínola

29 June Semifinals	São Paulo	3–0	Atlético Mineiro	São Paulo
00:00 (UTC-3)	Rogério Pinheiro 44'; Carlos Miguel 89'; Fabiano 90+1'	(Report) (pt)		Stadium: Morumbi; Referee: Oscar Roberto Godoi

2 July Semifinals	Atlético Mineiro	3–3 (3–6 agg.)	São Paulo	Belo Horizonte
00:00 (UTC-3)	Guilherme 18', 62'; Ramon 81'	(Report) (pt)	Marcelinho Paraíba 9', 76', 84'	Stadium: Mineirão

5 July Finals	São Paulo	0–0	Cruzeiro	São Paulo
21:30 (UTC-3)		(Report) (pt)		Stadium: Morumbi; Referee: Antônio Pereira da Silva

9 July Finals	Cruzeiro	2–1 (2–1 agg.)	São Paulo	Belo Horizonte
18:00 (UTC-3)	Fábio Júnior 80'; Geovanni 90'	(Report) (pt)	Marcelinho Paraíba 65'	Stadium: Mineirão; Attendance: 85,841; Referee: Carlos Eugênio Simon

==== Record ====
Final Position	Points	Matches	Wins	Draws	Losses	Goals For	Goals Away	Win%
2nd	26	12	8	2	2	28	13	72%

=== Copa dos Campeões ===
12 July First stage	São Paulo	0–0	Vitória	Maceió
19:00 (UTC-3)		(Report) (pt)		Stadium: Rei Pelé; Referee: Márcio Rezende de Freitas

15 July First stage	Vitória	0–2 (0–2 agg.)	São Paulo	João Pessoa
18:30 (UTC-3)		(Report) (pt)	Rogério Pinheiro 34'; Marcelinho Paraíba 37'	Stadium: Almeidão

19 July Semifinals	Sport	1–2	São Paulo	Maceió
21:45 (UTC-3)	Nildo 48'	(Report) (pt)	Ilan 56'; Marcelinho Paraíba 79'	Stadium: Rei Pelé; Referee: Márcio Rezende de Freitas

22 July Semifinals	São Paulo	1–3 (3–4 agg.)	Sport	João Pessoa
16:00 (UTC-3)	Marcelinho Paraíba 16'	(Report) (pt)	Adriano 38', 57'; Marquinhos 81'	Stadium: Almeidão; Referee: Antônio Pereira da Silva

==== Record ====
Final Position	Points	Matches	Wins	Draws	Losses	Goals For	Goals Away	Win%
4th	7	4	2	1	1	5	4	58%

=== Copa Mercosur ===
3 August Group C	Colo Colo (Chile)	3–1	(Brazil) São Paulo	Santiago
00:00 (UTC-3)	Reyes 4'; Pereira 43', 81'	(Report) (pt)	França 90+1' (pen.)	Stadium: Estadio Monumental David Arellano

23 August Group C	São Paulo (Brazil)	1–0	(Argentina) Rosario Central	São Paulo
00:00 (UTC-3)	Gustavo Nery 76'	(Report) (pt)		Stadium: Estádio do Morumbi

30 August Group C	Cerro Porteño (Paraguay)	4–2	(Brazil) São Paulo	Ciudad del Este
00:00 (UTC-3)	Zandoná 17'; Virgilio Ferreira 59'; Alvarenga 64'; Jorge Campos 75'	(Report) (pt)	Sandro Hiroshi 47'; Souza 78'	Stadium: Estadio Antonio Oddone Sarubbi

6 September Group C	São Paulo (Brazil)	4–0	(Chile) Colo Colo	São Paulo
00:00 (UTC-3)	Gustavo Nery 24'; Júlio Baptista 53'; Marcelo Ramos 68'; Alemão 81'	(Report) (pt)		Stadium: Estádio do Morumbi

21 September Group C	Rosario Central (Argentina)	2–1	(Brazil) São Paulo	Rosario
00:00 (UTC-3)	González 14'; Capeletti 69'	(Report) (pt)	Sandro Hiroshi 77'	Stadium: Estadio Gigante de Arroyito

19 October Group C	São Paulo (Brazil)	4–4	(Paraguay) Cerro Porteño	São Paulo
00:00 (UTC-3)	Souza 10', 54'; França 24', 90'	(Report) (pt)	Virgilio Ferreira 13'; Francisco Ferreira 61'; Alvarenga 75'; Fernández 79'	Stadium: Estádio do Morumbi

==== Record ====
Final Position	Points	Matches	Wins	Draws	Losses	Goals For	Goals Away	Win%
12th	7	6	2	1	3	13	13	38%

=== Copa João Havelange (Campeonato Brasileiro) ===
6 August Round 1	São Paulo	2–1	Santa Cruz	São Paulo
17:00 (UTC-3)	Souza 39'; França 58'	(Report) (pt)	Róbson 63'	Stadium: Morumbi; Attendance: 4,393; Referee: Luciano

9 August Round 2	Santos	1–1	São Paulo	Santos
20:30 (UTC-3)	Dodô 29'	(Report) (pt)	Fábio Simplício 51'	Stadium: Vila Belmiro; Attendance: 17,011; Referee: Alfredo Loebeling

12 August Round 3	São Paulo	3–2	Flamengo	São Paulo
18:00 (UTC-3)	Fábio Simplício 21'; Rogério Pinheiro 49'; Sandro Hiroshi 87'	(Report) (pt)	Adriano 15', 20'	Stadium: Morumbi; Attendance: 5,303; Referee: Márcio Rezende de Freitas

16 August Round 4	Cruzeiro	2–2	São Paulo	Belo Horizonte
22:00 (UTC-3)	Geovanni 31', 56'	(Report) (pt)	Marcelo Ramos 28'; Fabiano 42'	Stadium: Mineirão; Attendance: 4,454; Referee: Reinaldo Ribas

20 August Round 5	São Paulo	1–1	Bahia	São Paulo
17:00 (UTC-3)	Marcelo Ramos 32'	(Report) (pt)	Capixaba 3'	Stadium: Morumbi; Attendance: 5,935; Referee: Léo Feldman

26 August Round 6	Atlético Paranaense	2–1	São Paulo	Curitiba
15:45 (UTC-3)	Kléber Pereira 9'; Lobatón 26'	(Report) (pt)	França 67'	Stadium: Arena da Baixada; Attendance: 7,091; Referee: Antônio Pereira da Silva

2 September Round 7	Palmeiras	0–3	São Paulo	São Paulo
18:00 (UTC-3)		(Report) (pt)	Rogério Pinheiro 13'; Marcelo Ramos 64'; Gustavo Nery 81'	Stadium: Morumbi; Attendance: 1,795; Referee: Edílson Pereira de Carvalho

9 September Round 8	São Paulo	2–0	Fluminense	São Paulo
15:45 (UTC-3)	França 14', 90+1'	(Report) (pt)		Stadium: Morumbi; Attendance: 8,531; Referee: Fabiano Gonçalves

13 September Round 9	Ponte Preta	3–3	São Paulo	Campinas
20:30 (UTC-3)	Marco Aurélio 32'; Washington 35'; Macedo 85'	(Report) (pt)	Marcelo Ramos 66'; Gustavo Nery 86'; Wilson 88'	Stadium: Moisés Lucarelli; Attendance: 6,112; Referee: Paulo César de Oliveira

17 September Round 10	São Paulo	2–0	Portuguesa	São Paulo
16:00 (UTC-3)	França 12'; Rogério Ceni 85' (pen.)	(Report) (pt)		Stadium: Morumbi; Attendance: 5,754; Referee: Romildo Corrêa

24 September Round 11	Gama	1–3	São Paulo	Brasília
17:00 (UTC-3)	Romualdo 65'	(Report) (pt)	Beto 64'; Marcelo Ramos 74'; Sandro Hiroshi 80'	Stadium: Mané Garrincha; Attendance: 4,165; Referee: Antônio Pereira da Silva

27 September Round 12	São Paulo	3–0	América	São Paulo
20:30 (UTC-3)	Gustavo Nery 26'; Sandro Hiroshi 39'; Marcelo Ramos 71' (pen.)	(Report) (pt)		Stadium: Morumbi; Attendance: 2,607; Referee: Leonardo da Silva

30 September Round 13	Goiás	2–2	São Paulo	Goiânia
16:00 (UTC-3)	Araújo 26'; Evair 77'	(Report) (pt)	Ilan 74'; Sandro Hiroshi 79'	Stadium: Serra Dourada; Attendance: 31,102; Referee: Márcio Rezende de Freitas

4 October Round 14	São Paulo	1–1	Grêmio	São Paulo
20:30 (UTC-3)	Rogério Ceni 45+2'	(Report) (pt)	Warley 90'	Stadium: Morumbi; Attendance: 3,038; Referee: Marco Antônio Colares

7 October Round 15	Vitória	5–1	São Paulo	Salvador
16:00 (UTC-3)	Sinval 9', 25'; Vítor 12', 56'; Sandoval 41'	(Report) (pt)	Beto 2'	Stadium: Barradão; Attendance: 4,101; Referee: Oscar Roberto Godoi

11 October Round 16	São Paulo	3–2	Coritiba	São Paulo
20:30 (UTC-3)	França 8'; Carlos Miguel 78'; Fábio Simplício 90'	(Report) (pt)	Da Silva 31'; Marquinhos 55'	Stadium: Morumbi; Attendance: 3,167; Referee: Wagner Tardelli

15 October Round 17	Botafogo	1–0	São Paulo	Niterói
18:30 (UTC-3)	Rodrigo 67'	(Report) (pt)		Stadium: Estádio Caio Martins; Attendance: 1,212; Referee: Fabiano Gonçalves

17 October Round 18	São Paulo	1–1	Internacional	São Paulo
20:30 (UTC-3)	Rogério Ceni 48'	(Report) (pt)	Ronaldo Alves 41'	Stadium: Morumbi; Attendance: 2,907; Referee: Léo Feldman

22 October Round 19	São Paulo	2–2	Guarani	São Paulo
18:30 (UTC-3)	França 35' (pen.); Souza 67'	(Report) (pt)	Martinez 77'; Jacques 88'	Stadium: Morumbi; Referee: Salvio Fagundes Filho

28 October Round 20	São Paulo	2–1	Atlético Mineiro	São Paulo
16:00 (UTC-3)	Marcelo Ramos 21', 80'	(Report) (pt)	Guilherme 32'	Stadium: Morumbi; Referee: Carlos Eugênio Simon

5 November Round 21	Juventude	3–1	São Paulo	Caxias do Sul
16:00 (UTC-3)	Michel 19'; Marcos Paulo 65'; Adriano Chuva 90+1'	(Report) (pt)	França 53'	Stadium: Alfredo Jaconi; Referee: Giuliano Bozzano

8 November Round 22	Sport	4–3	São Paulo	Recife
21:40 (UTC-3)	Nildo 2', 90+1'; Taílson 46'; Adriano 66'	(Report) (pt)	Marcelo Ramos 45+4', 86' (pen.); Rogério Pinheiro 49'	Stadium: Ilha do Retiro; Referee: Álvaro Quelhas

12 November Round 23	São Paulo	0–0	Corinthians	São Paulo
16:00 (UTC-3)		(Report) (pt)		Stadium: Morumbi; Referee: Romildo Corrêa

19 November Round 24	Vasco da Gama	0–4	São Paulo	Rio de Janeiro
16:00 (UTC-3)		(Report) (pt)	Fábio Simplício 19', 30'; Valkmar 64' (o.g.); Beto 84'	Stadium: São Januário; Referee: Carlos Eugênio Simon

25 November Round of 16	Palmeiras	1–1	São Paulo	São Paulo
16:00 (UTC-3)	Adriano 45+1' (pen.)	(Report) (pt)	Marcelo Ramos 89'	Stadium: Pacaembu; Attendance: 17,507; Referee: Cléber Wellington Abade

30 November Round of 16	São Paulo	1–2 (2–3 agg.)	Palmeiras	São Paulo
21:40 (UTC-3)	Marcelo Ramos 56' (pen.)	(Report) (pt)	Tuta 35' (pen.); Galeano 58'	Stadium: Morumbi; Attendance: 32,009; Referee: Paulo César de Oliveira

==== Record ====
Final Position	Points	Matches	Wins	Draws	Losses	Goals For	Goals Away	Win%
12th	40	26	10	10	6	48	38	51%
