= 2000 CONCACAF Gold Cup final =

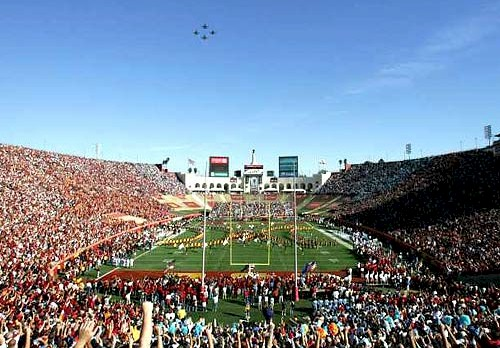
- The Memorial Coliseum in Los Angeles hosted the final.
- Event: 2000 CONCACAF Gold Cup
Canada	Colombia
(Canada)	(Colombia)
2	0
- Date: February 27, 2000
- Venue: Memorial Coliseum, Los Angeles
- Referee: Peter Prendergast (Jamaica)
- Attendance: 6,197
- Weather: rainy

The 2000 CONCACAF Gold Cup final was a soccer match played on February 27, 2000 at the Memorial Coliseum, Los Angeles to determine the winner of the 2000 CONCACAF Gold Cup. Canada beat invitees Colombia 2–0. This was Canada's first Gold Cup title and its second major title, the first since the 1985 CONCACAF Championship. As the Gold Cup champions, Canada represented CONCACAF at the 2001 FIFA Confederations Cup in Japan.

To date, this remains the only CONCACAF Gold Cup final in which neither the United States nor Mexico reached, and the only final neither one won (they both went out in the quarterfinals).

== Background ==
As the lowest-ranked member of the North American Football Union, Canada did not have an automatic CONCACAF Gold Cup berth. They instead had to play three qualification matches, held in October 1999 in the United States. The Canadians qualified by leading the group ahead of Haiti, the other qualified nation; below them were Cuba and El Salvador, who both failed to qualify.

Colombia, a member of CONMEBOL was invited to the tournament by CONCACAF. Peru was also invited to the 2000 edition, making them the second South American countries to play the Gold Cup after Brazil, which participated in 1996 and in 1998. By reaching the final match, Colombia repeated the same record as Brazil in 1996.

Both, Colombia and Canada had been runner-ups in their groups during the group stage, respectively Groups A and D. However, Canada and South Korea, another invited participant, tied in every criterion in Group D and the qualification had to be decided in the coin toss, favoring Canada.

At the time of the competition, Canada hadn't won a major title since 1985, while Colombia had yet to win a major title in its history.

== Route to the final ==
Canada
Round
Colombia
Opponents
Result
Group stage
Opponents
Result
Costa Rica
2–2
Match 1
Jamaica
1–0
South Korea
0–0
Match 2
Honduras
0–2
Group D runners-up
Final standings
Group A runners-up

Pos	Team	Pld	Pts
1	Costa Rica	2	2
2	Canada	2	2
3	South Korea	2	2

Source: ESPN

Pos	Team	Pld	Pts
1	Honduras	2	6
2	Colombia	2	3
3	Jamaica	2	0

Pos	Team	Pld	Pts
1	Costa Rica	2	2
2	Canada	2	2
3	South Korea	2	2

Source: ESPN
Opponents
Result
Knockout stage
Opponents
Result
Mexico
2–1 (a.e.t.)
Quarter-finals
United States
2–2 (2–1 pen.)
Trinidad and Tobago
1–0
Semi-finals
Peru
2–1

== Match details ==
February 7, 2000
15:00 (12:00 UTC−8)

Canada	2–0	Colombia
De Vos 45'; Corazzin 68' (pen.)	Report

Memorial Coliseum, Los Angeles
Attendance: 6,197
Referee: Peter Prendergast (Jamaica)

Canada	Colombia

GK	1	Craig Forrest
CB	2	Paul Fenwick	(yellow card) 28'
CB	5	Jason de Vos (c)	(yellow card) 76'
CB	13	Mark Watson
RWB	7	Paul Stalteri	(yellow card) 78'
LWB	15	Richard Hastings
DM	4	Tony Menezes	(yellow card) 80'
RM	12	Jeff Clarke
LM	11	Jim Brennan
AM	21	Martin Nash		(substituted off) 89'
CF	9	Carlo Corazzin
Substitutions:
FW	16	Garret Kusch		(substituted on) 89'
Manager:
(Germany) Holger Osieck			(red card) 84'

GK	22	Diego Gómez
RB	2	Andrés Mosquera	(yellow card) 88'
CB	19	Arley Dinas
CB	14	John Wilmar Pérez
LB	16	Bonner Mosquera		(substituted off) 46'
CM	5	Gonzalo Martínez
CM	11	Martín Zapata
CM	3	Roberto Carlos Cortés
AM	17	Mayer Candelo
CF	20	Victor Bonilla		(substituted off) 57'
CF	10	Faustino Asprilla (c)	(yellow card) 19'
Substitutions:
MF	7	Héctor Hurtado		(substituted on) 46'
FW	9	Edwin Congo	(yellow card) 80'	(substituted on) 57'
Manager:
Luis Augusto García

== See also ==
- 1985 CONCACAF Championship
- 2001 Copa América final
