= 1999 Copa Libertadores =

40th season of Copa Libertadores

1999 Copa Libertadores de América
1999 Copa Toyota Libertadores de América 1999 Copa Toyota Libertadores da América

Tournament details
- Dates: 21 February – 16 June
- Teams: 21 (from 11 associations)

Final positions
- Champions: (Brazil) Palmeiras (1st title)
- Runners-up: (Colombia) Deportivo Cali

Tournament statistics
- Matches played: 90
- Goals scored: 257 (2.86 per match)
- Top scorer(s): (Colombia) Víctor Bonilla (6 goals) (Brazil) Fernando Baiano (6 goals) (Brazil) Gauchinho (6 goals) (Venezuela) Ruberth Morán (6 goals) (Uruguay) Rubén Sosa (6 goals) (Colombia) Martín Zapata (6 goals)

The 1999 Copa Libertadores was the 40th edition of the Copa Libertadores, South America's premier club championship. It was held between February 21 and June 16. Palmeiras became the champions after beating Deportivo Cali on penalties for the first time in their history. from Brazil, after the team defeated Deportivo Cali, from Colombia, in the decisive match held at Estádio Palestra Itália, São Paulo, on June 16, 1999. The match ended 2–1 in regular time and 4–3 in a penalty shootout. The first leg of the final, played on June 2 in the Colombian city of Cali at Estadio Olímpico Pascual Guerrero, saw Deportivo win 1–0.

This was the first Libertadores title for Palmeiras, which had previously been runners-up position in 1961 and 1968.

The coach who led Palmeiras to this historic victory was Luiz Felipe Scolari, who, three years later, guided the Brazilian national team to its fifth World Cup title in 2002. Palmeiras' goalkeeper Marcos was the tournament’s standout revelation and was also named the best player of the 1999 continental competition by Conmebol.

== History ==
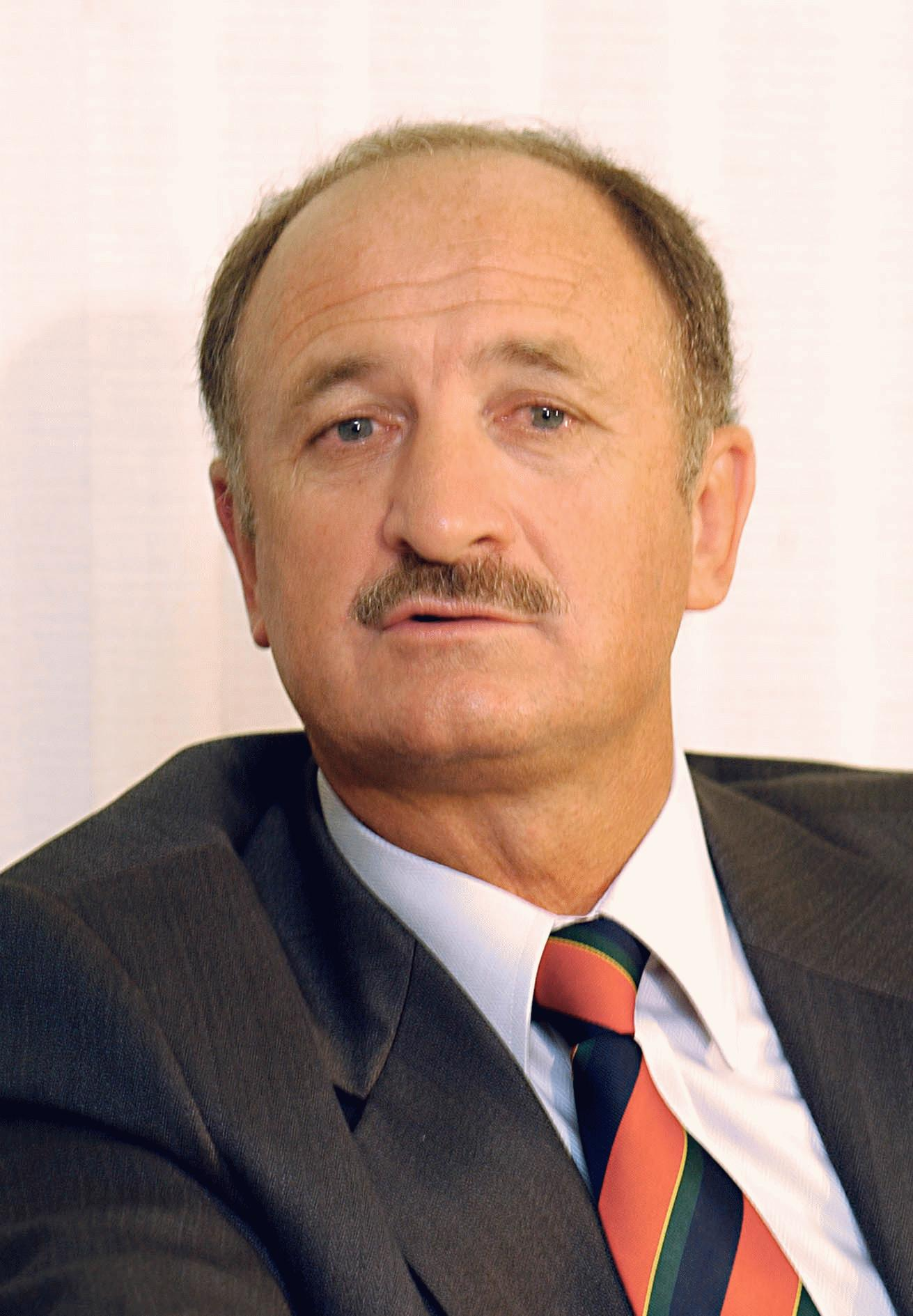
Luiz Felipe Scolari

The core Palmeiras team, besides goalkeeper Marcos, who replaced injured keeper Velloso during the group stage, consisted of fullbacks Arce (right) and Júnior (left); center-backs Júnior Baiano and Roque Júnior; defensive midfielders César Sampaio and Rogério; midfielders Alex and Zinho; and forwards Paulo Nunes and Oséas. Other key players included forwards Evair and Euller, as well as center-back Cléber and defensive midfielder Galeano.

Before reaching the final, Palmeiras eliminated River Plate of Argentina in the semi-finals. River had previously ousted fellow Argentine club Vélez Sársfield in the quarterfinals. In the first leg, played in Buenos Aires at the Estadio Monumental de Núñez, River defeated Palmeiras 1-0. In the return leg at Estádio Palestra Itália, Palmeiras won 3-0.

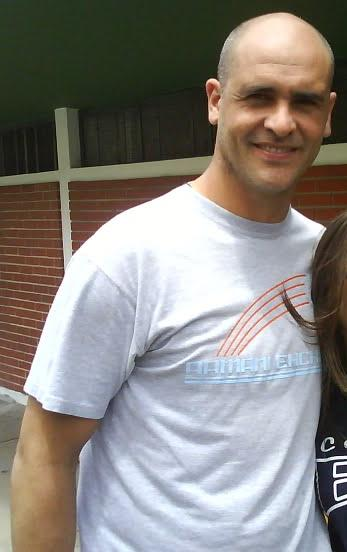
Marcos

In the quarterfinals, Palmeiras eliminated their arch-rival Corinthians. Both matches were held at Estádio do Morumbi, each ending 2-0: Palmeiras won the first, Corinthians the second. The tie went to penalties, with Palmeiras prevailing 4-2. A similar scenario unfolded in the 2000 edition, this time in the semi-finals, again decided by penalties (5-4) and once more favoring Palmeiras, who advanced to the final.

In the round of 16 in 1999, Palmeiras defeated the defending champions, Vasco da Gama. The first match, held at Estádio Palestra Itália, ended 1-1. The second, played at Estádio São Januário, saw Palmeiras win 4-2.

During the group stage, Palmeiras finished second with 10 points, behind Corinthians with 12 points. Both Brazilian teams, along with Cerro Porteño, advanced from Group 3, leaving Paraguayan club Olimpia in last place with just 5 points.

== First round ==
- Teams in green qualified to the Round of 16
- Teams in red were eliminated

Twenty teams were distributed among five groups in the First Round; the top three of each group qualified to the playoff bracket. Vasco da Gama (winner of the previous edition of the tournament) received a bye to the playoff bracket.

=== Group 1 ===
Pos	Team	Pld	W	D	L	GF	GA	GD	Pts	Qualification
1	(Uruguay) Nacional	6	4	0	2	9	8	+1	12	Round of 16
2	(Venezuela) Estudiantes de Mérida	6	3	0	3	9	14	−5	9	Round of 16
3	(Uruguay) Bella Vista	6	2	1	3	9	6	+3	7	Round of 16
4	(Mexico) Monterrey	6	2	1	3	10	9	+1	7	

=== Group 2 ===
Pos	Team	Pld	W	D	L	GF	GA	GD	Pts	Qualification
1	(Argentina) Vélez Sársfield	6	2	3	1	6	3	+3	9	Round of 16
2	(Colombia) Deportivo Cali	6	3	0	3	4	8	−4	9	Round of 16
3	(Argentina) River Plate	6	2	2	2	8	8	0	8	Round of 16
4	(Colombia) Once Caldas	6	2	1	3	7	6	+1	7	

=== Group 3 ===
Pos	Team	Pld	W	D	L	GF	GA	GD	Pts	Qualification
1	(Brazil) Corinthians	6	4	0	2	16	8	+8	12	Round of 16
2	(Brazil) Palmeiras	6	3	1	2	12	10	+2	10	Round of 16
3	(Paraguay) Cerro Porteño	6	2	1	3	14	20	−6	7	Round of 16
4	(Paraguay) Olimpia	6	1	2	3	11	15	−4	5	

=== Group 4 ===
Pos	Team	Pld	W	D	L	GF	GA	GD	Pts	Qualification
1	(Chile) Universidad Católica	6	3	2	1	9	5	+4	11	Round of 16
2	(Chile) Colo Colo	6	2	2	2	5	7	−2	8	Round of 16
3	(Peru) Universitario	6	2	1	3	7	8	−1	7	Round of 16
4	(Peru) Sporting Cristal	6	0	5	1	7	8	−1	5	

=== Group 5 ===
Pos	Team	Pld	W	D	L	GF	GA	GD	Pts	Qualification
1	(Ecuador) LDU Quito	6	3	1	2	10	8	+2	10	Round of 16
2	(Ecuador) Emelec	6	3	0	3	9	12	−3	9	Round of 16
3	(Bolivia) Jorge Wilstermann	6	2	2	2	9	9	0	8	Round of 16
4	(Bolivia) Blooming	6	2	1	3	5	4	+1	7	

== Knockout stages ==
=== Bracket ===
Round of 16
(Colombia) Deportivo Cali	2	0	2
(Chile) Colo-Colo	0	1	1
(Uruguay) Bella Vista	2	3	5
(Chile) U. Católica	2	1	3
(Ecuador) Emelec	1	1	2
(Venezuela) Estudiantes	3	0	3
(Paraguay) Cerro Porteño	5	1	6
(Uruguay) Nacional	0	2	2
(Argentina) River Plate	1	0	1 (5)
(Ecuador) LDU Quito	0	1	1 (4)
(Peru) Universitario	0	0	0
(Argentina) Vélez Sarsfield	0	4	4
(Brazil) Palmeiras	1	4	5
(Brazil) Vasco da Gama	1	2	3
(Bolivia) Jorge Wilstermann	1	2	3
(Brazil) Corinthians	1	5	6

Quarterfinals
(Colombia) Deportivo Cali	2	1	3
(Uruguay) Bella Vista	1	1	2
(Venezuela) Estudiantes	3	0	3
(Paraguay) Cerro Porteño	0	4	4
(Argentina) River Plate	2	0	2
(Argentina) Vélez Sarsfield	0	1	1
(Brazil) Palmeiras	2	0	2 (4)
(Brazil) Corinthians	0	2	2 (2)

Semifinals
(Colombia) Deportivo Cali	4	2	6
(Paraguay) Cerro Porteño	0	3	3
(Argentina) River Plate	1	0	1
(Brazil) Palmeiras	0	3	3

Finals
(Colombia) Deportivo Cali	1	1	2 (3)
(Brazil) Palmeiras	0	2	2 (4)

=== Round of 16 ===
First leg matches were played on April 14. Second leg matches were on April 20 and April 21.

Team 1	Agg.	Team 2	1st leg	2nd leg
Cerro Porteño (Paraguay)	6–2	(Uruguay) Nacional	5–0	1–2
Universitario (Peru)	0–4	(Argentina) Vélez Sársfield	0–0	0–4
Jorge Wilstermann (Bolivia)	3–6	(Brazil) Corinthians	1–1	2–5
Bella Vista (Uruguay)	5–3	(Chile) Universidad Católica	2–2	3–1
River Plate (Argentina)	1–1 (5–4 pk)	(Ecuador) LDU Quito	1–0	0–1
Emelec (Ecuador)	2–3	(Venezuela) Estudiantes	1–3	1–0
Deportivo Cali (Colombia)	2–1	(Chile) Colo Colo	2–0	0–1
Palmeiras (Brazil)	5–3	(Brazil) Vasco da Gama	1–1	4–2

=== Quarterfinals ===
First leg matches were played on May 5. Second leg matches were played on May 12.

Team 1	Agg.	Team 2	1st leg	2nd leg
River Plate (Argentina)	2–1	(Argentina) Vélez Sársfield	2–0	0–1
Palmeiras (Brazil)	2–2 (4–2 pk)	(Brazil) Corinthians	2–0	0–2
Estudiantes (Venezuela)	3–4	(Paraguay) Cerro Porteño	3–0	0–4
Deportivo Cali (Colombia)	3–2	(Uruguay) Bella Vista	2–1	1–1

=== Semi-finals ===
First leg matches were played on May 19. Second leg matches were played on May 26.

Team 1	Agg.	Team 2	1st leg	2nd leg
Deportivo Cali (Colombia)	6–3	(Paraguay) Cerro Porteño	4–0	2–3
River Plate (Argentina)	1–3	(Brazil) Palmeiras	1–0	0–3

=== Finals ===
First leg match were played on June 2. Second leg match were played on June 16.

Team 1	Agg.	Team 2	1st leg	2nd leg
Deportivo Cali (Colombia)	2–2 (3–4 pk)	(Brazil) Palmeiras	1–0	1–2

== Champion ==
Copa Libertadores 1999

First title

== Broadcasting rights ==
=== Americas ===
- (Organization of American States) Latin America: local channels
