= 1999 Intercontinental Cup =

- Match programme cover
Manchester United	Palmeiras
(England)	(Brazil)
1	0
- Date: 30 November 1999
- Venue: National Stadium, Tokyo
- Man of the Match: Ryan Giggs (Manchester United)
- Referee: Hellmut Krug (Germany)
- Attendance: 53,372
- Weather: Clear; 12 °C (54 °F); 58% humidity

The 1999 Intercontinental Cup was an association football match played on 30 November 1999 between Manchester United, winners of the 1998–99 UEFA Champions League, and Palmeiras, winners of the 1999 Copa Libertadores. The match was played at the neutral venue of the National Stadium in Tokyo in front of 53,372 spectators.

Manchester United won the match 1–0, with captain Roy Keane taking advantage of a mistake by Palmeiras goalkeeper Marcos to score the winning goal. This was United's only Intercontinental Cup triumph, having been beaten by Estudiantes in the 1968 competition. This game was Palmeiras' only appearance in the Intercontinental Cup. Ryan Giggs was given the man of the match award. Manchester United's victory made them the first and only team from England and also the British Isles to win the Intercontinental Cup.

== Teams ==
Team	Qualification	Previous participation (bold indicates winners)
(England) Manchester United	1998–99 UEFA Champions League winners	1968
(Brazil) Palmeiras	1999 Copa Libertadores winners	None

== Venue ==
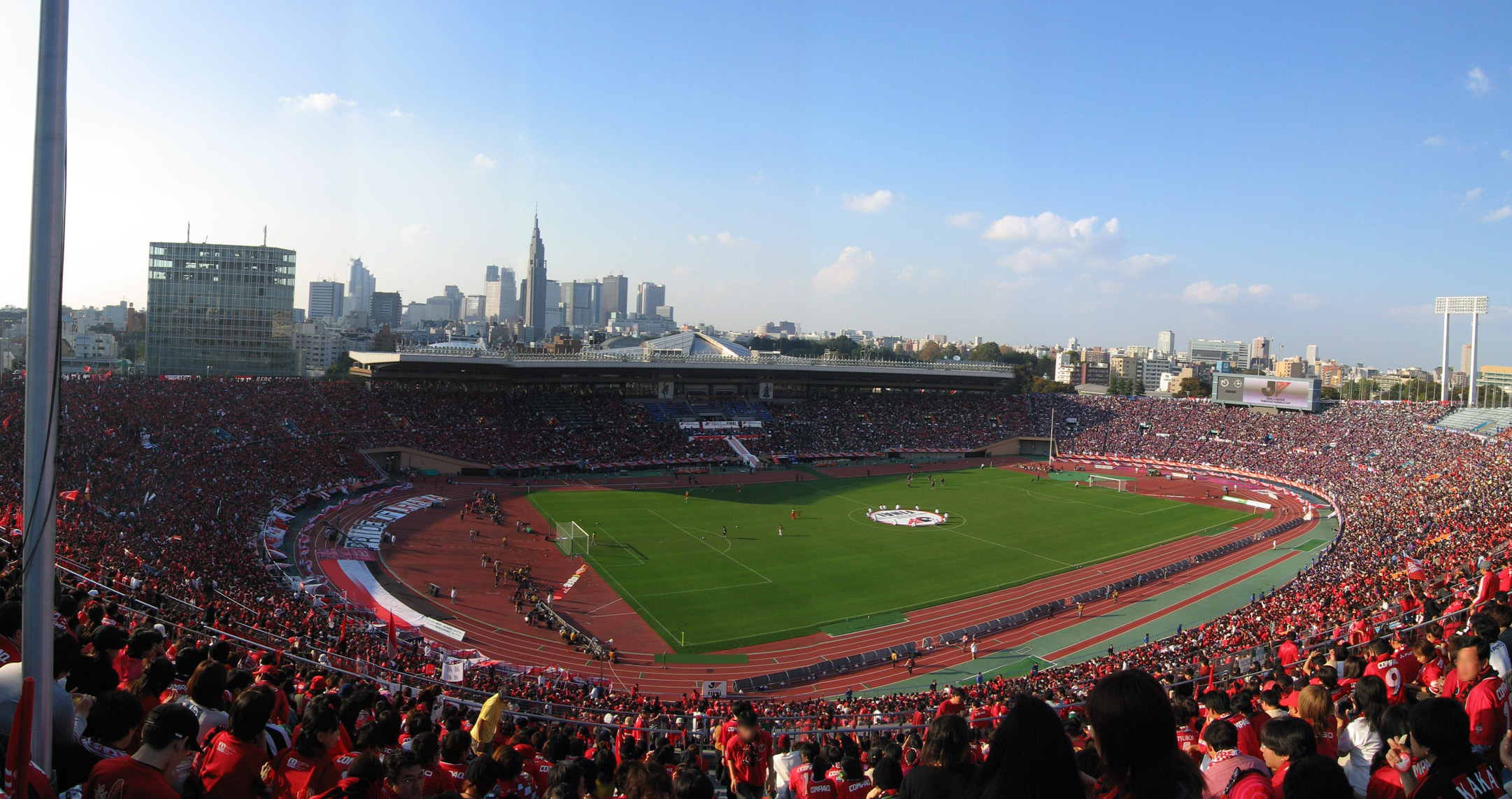
The National Stadium in Tokyo hosted the match

For the 20th consecutive season, as a result of the competition's sponsorship by Toyota, the match was played at a neutral venue, the National Stadium in Tokyo, Japan.

== Match ==
=== Details ===
30 November 1999
19:10 JST

Manchester United (England)	1–0	(Brazil) Palmeiras
Keane 35'	Report

National Stadium, Tokyo
Attendance: 53,372
Referee: Hellmut Krug (Germany)

**Manchester United**	**Palmeiras**

GK	1	(Australia) Mark Bosnich
RB	2	(England) Gary Neville
CB	6	(Netherlands) Jaap Stam
CB	27	(France) Mikaël Silvestre	(yellow card) 79'
LB	3	(Republic of Ireland) Denis Irwin
DM	16	(Republic of Ireland) Roy Keane (c)
RM	7	(England) David Beckham
CM	8	(England) Nicky Butt
CM	18	(England) Paul Scholes		(substituted off) 75'
LM	11	(Wales) Ryan Giggs
CF	20	(Norway) Ole Gunnar Solskjær		(substituted off) 46'
Substitutes:
GK	26	(Italy) Massimo Taibi
DF	12	(England) Phil Neville
DF	28	(England) Danny Higginbotham
MF	25	(South Africa) Quinton Fortune
MF	30	(England) Ronnie Wallwork
FW	10	(England) Teddy Sheringham		(substituted on) 75'
FW	19	(Trinidad and Tobago) Dwight Yorke		(substituted on) 46'
Manager:
(Scotland) Sir Alex Ferguson

GK	1	(Brazil) Marcos
RB	2	(Paraguay) Chiqui Arce
CB	4	(Brazil) Roque Júnior
CB	3	(Brazil) Júnior Baiano
LB	6	(Brazil) Júnior
DM	15	(Brazil) Galeano		(substituted off) 54'
DM	5	(Brazil) César Sampaio
AM	10	(Brazil) Alex	(yellow card) 28'
AM	11	(Brazil) Zinho (c)
CF	7	(Brazil) Paulo Nunes		(substituted off) 77'
CF	20	(Colombia) Faustino Asprilla		(substituted off) 56'
Substitutes:
GK	12	(Brazil) Sérgio
DF	13	(Brazil) Tiago Silva
DF	18	(Brazil) Cléber
MF	8	(Brazil) Rogério
FW	9	(Brazil) Oséas		(substituted on) 56'
FW	17	(Brazil) Evair		(substituted on) 54'
FW	19	(Brazil) Euller		(substituted on) 77'
Manager:
(Brazil) Luiz Felipe Scolari

Man of the Match:
Ryan Giggs (Manchester United)

Assistant referees:
Jeon Young-hyun (South Korea)
Yoshikazu Hiroshima (Japan)
Fourth official:
Masayoshi Okada (Japan)

=== Statistics ===
Overall
	Manchester United	Palmeiras
Goals scored	1	0
Total shots	8	15
Shots on target	1	4
Corner kicks	6	12
Offsides	16	13
Yellow cards	1	1
Red cards	0	0

== See also ==
- 1998–99 UEFA Champions League
- 1999 Copa Libertadores
- 2000 FIFA Club World Championship
- Manchester United F.C. in European football
