= Paulo Nunes =

Brazilian footballer (born 1971)

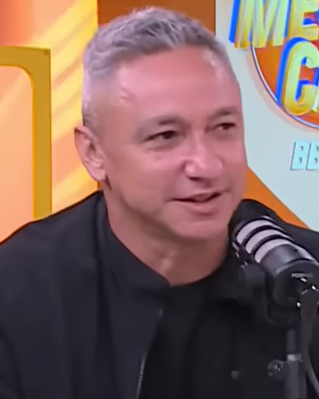
- Paulo Nunes in 2026

Personal information
- Full name: Arílson de Paula Nunes
- Date of birth: 30 October 1971 (age 55)
- Place of birth: Pontalina, Brazil
- Height: 1.74 m (5 ft 9 in)
- Position: Second striker

Youth career
- Flamengo

Senior career*
Years	Team	Apps	(Gls)
1991–1994	Flamengo	45	(30)
1995–1997	Grêmio	44	(27)
1997	Benfica	5	(4)
1998–1999	Palmeiras	39	(23)
2000	Grêmio	18	(13)
2001	Corinthians	6	(4)
2002	Gama	12	(8)
2002	Al-Nassr	1	(0)
2003	Mogi Mirim	5	(3)
Total		175	(112)

International career
1997	Brazil	2	(0)
- * Club domestic league appearances and goals

Arílson de Paula Nunes (born 30 October 1971), better known as Paulo Nunes, is a Brazilian football pundit and retired footballer who played as a forward.

== Club career ==
=== Flamengo ===
A product of Flamengo's youth system, Paulo Nunes was part of a generation of players in the Gávea team, such as Djalminha, Júnior Baiano, Marquinhos, Nélio, Marcelinho Carioca and Sávio. However, Paulo Nunes did not achieve stardom in Flamengo, and only went to achieve success in other clubs, as it was the case with his former youth team teammates. Paulo Nunes, however, won the 1990 Copa do Brasil with the Rio club, the 1991 Campeonato Carioca and finally the 1992 Campeonato Brasileiro Série A.

=== Grêmio ===
Paulo Nunes left Flamengo in 1995, moving on to Grêmio, where he joined another player who had left a Rio de Janeiro club, Jardel formerly of Vasco.

At Grêmio, Paulo Nunes won two Campeonato Gaúcho titles, the Copa Libertadores cup, the Campeonato Brasileiro, the Recopa Sul-Americana and the Copa do Brasil for the Porto Alegre team and was the lead scorer in the 1996 Campeonato Brasileiro and the 1997 Copa do Brasil. His form also earned him the Bola de Prata from Placar magazine, and a place in the national team squad for the 1997 Copa América.

=== Return to Brazil and success at Palmeiras ===
After departing from Grêmio in 1997, he went on to play for the Portuguese club S.L. Benfica. However, injuries hastened his return to Brazil. In 1998, Paulo Nunes joined Palmeiras. Joining Atlético Paranaense recruited Oséas in the attack, Paulo Nunes went on to win the 1998 Copa do Brasil, the third one in his career, the Copa Mercosul and also the 1999 Copa Libertadores. After the defeat against Manchester United for the Intercontinental Cup, Paulo Nunes left Palmeiras.

=== Departure from Palmeiras ===
Paulo Nunes returned to Grêmio for one season. Afterwards, he played for Corinthians, Gama, Al Nassr and Mogi Mirim, where he retired in 2003, at the age of 32.

== International career ==
Paulo Nunes played his first game for the Brazil national team on 3 June 1997, when his country and France drew 1–1 for the Tournoi de France. Paulo Nunes second and last game for the country was the 29 June 1997 Copa América final against Bolivia, when his team beat the opponent team 3–1. In doing so his 1997 Brazil national team won the Copa América.

== Career statistics ==
Appearances and goals by national team and year
National team	Year	Apps	Goals
Brazil	1997	2	0
Total		2	0

== Honours ==
Flamengo

- Copa São Paulo de Futebol Júnior: 1990
- Copa do Brasil: 1990
- Copa Rio: 1991
- Campeonato Carioca: 1991
- Campeonato Brasileiro: 1992

Grêmio

- Campeonato Gaúcho: 1995, 1996
- Copa Libertadores da América: 1995
- Recopa Sul-Americana: 1996
- Campeonato Brasileiro: 1996
- Copa do Brasil: 1997

Palmeiras

- Copa do Brasil: 1998
- Copa Mercosul: 1998
- Copa Libertadores da América: 1999
- Intercontinental Cup runner-up: 1999

Corinthians

- Campeonato Paulista: 2001

Brazil

- Copa América: 1997

Individual

- Bola de Prata Placar: 1996
- Campeonato Brasileiro top scorer (16 goals): 1996
- Copa do Brasil top scorer (9 goals): 1997
