= Marcelão =

Brazilian footballer

Personal information
- Full name: Anderson Marcelo da Silva
- Date of birth: 23 January 1981 (age 45)
- Place of birth: Kaloré, Paraná, Brazil
- Height: 1.88 m (6 ft 2 in)
- Position: Central defender

Senior career*
Years	Team	Apps	(Gls)
2001–2002	FC Barcelona		
2001–2002	Gimnàstic (loan)		(1)
2004–2005	Oeste		
2005	→ Marília (loan)		
2006	São Bento		
2006–2007	Vila Nova	26	(6)
2007	→ Brasiliense (loan)	47	(8)
2007–2008	Boavista F.C.		
2008–2010	Asteras Tripolis		
2010–2011	Al Sharjah		
2011	Anápolis		
2013	Inter de Limeira		
- * Club domestic league appearances and goals as of 17 July 2009

Anderson Marcelo da Silva (born 23 January 1981 in Kaloré, Paraná), commonly known as Marcelão, is a Brazilian footballer. He last played for Inter de Limeira.

== Career ==
Marcelão played domestically with Mogi-Mirim, Londrina and Guarantinguetá (2000–2001). In April 2001 he left for FC Barcelona with Triguinho. This transfer was remarkable as Guarantinguetá is owned by "CSR Futebol e Marketing", an organization of former Brazilian international Rivaldo who played at FC Barcelona at the time. Marcelão was registered by FC Barcelona for the La Liga as a replacement for the long-term injured Abelardo Fernández, but the Brazilian ultimately did not play in the Spanish league. Marcelão did play two games in the Copa de Catalunya, on 26 April 2001 as a substitute against UDA Gramenet and on 13 June 2001 in the starting line-up in the final against CF Balaguer. In August 2001, he played against Derby County FC and Blackburn Rovers FC during a training camp in England. In both games, the defender was a substitute for Patrik Andersson: against Derby County he replaced the Swedish twenty minutes before the end and against Blackburn Rovers at half-time. In the season 2001/2002 Marcelão was sent on loan to Gimnàstic de Tarragona to play in the Segunda División.

Marcelão played for Oeste in 2004, and in 2005 for Marília. In 2007, while playing for Vila Nova, he was loaned to Brasiliense for the club's participation in that year's Copa do Brasil.

In 2007, he was transferred from Vila Nova to Boavista for the 2007-08 Portuguese season. Marcelão joined Greek club Asteras Tripolis in 2008.
