= Sérgio (footballer, born 1970) =

Brazilian footballer

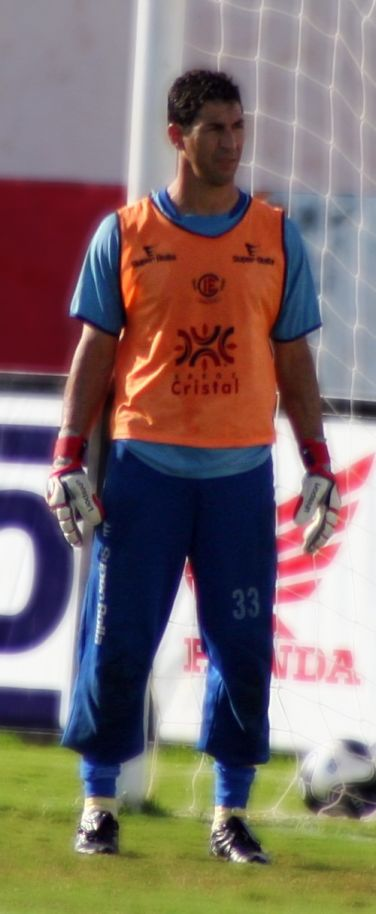
- Sérgio playing for Itumbiara

Personal information
- Full name: Sérgio Luís de Araújo
- Date of birth: 11 May 1970 (age 56)
- Place of birth: Kaloré, Paraná, Brazil
- Height: 1.88 m (6 ft 2 in)
- Position: Goalkeeper

Senior career*
| Years | Team | Apps | (Gls) |
| 1990–1991 | Ceilândia | 12 | (0) |
| 1992–1994 | Palmeiras | 21 | (0) |
| 1995 | Flamengo | 4 | (0) |
| 1996 | Palmeiras | 14 | (0) |
| 1997 | Internacional de Limeira | 5 | (0) |
| 1997 | Palmeiras | 2 | (0) |
| 1997 | Portuguesa | 8 | (0) |
| 1998 | Vitória | 12 | (0) |
| 1998–2006 | Palmeiras | 154 | (0) |
| 2007 | Santo André | 10 | (0) |
| 2007 | Bahia | 13 | (0) |
| 2008 | Portuguesa | 33 | (0) |
| 2009 | Itumbiara | 8 | (0) |
| 2009 | Santos | 3 | (0) |
| 2010 | Itumbiara | 3 | (0) |
| 2010 | Marilia | 8 | (0) |
| 2011 | Itumbiara | 0 | (0) |
| 2011 | Imbituba | 17 | (0) |
| 2013 | Taboão da Serra | 0 | (0) |
- * Club domestic league appearances and goals as of 23:30, 31 May 2010 (UTC)

Sérgio Luís de Araújo, usually known as Sérgio (born 11 May 1970 in Kaloré, Paraná), is a Brazilian football player who played as goalkeeper. Sergio retired in 2013 after playing for Taboão da Serra.

He played for Palmeiras, Portuguesa and Vitória in the Campeonato Brasileiro.

== Titles ==
=== With Palmeiras ===
- Campeonato Paulista: 1993, 1994
- Rio-São Paulo Tournament: 1993, 2000
- Brazilian Série A: 1993, 1994
- Copa Libertadores: 1999
- Brazilian Champions Cup: 2000
- Brazilian Série B: 2003
- Intercontinental Cup runner-up: 1999

=== with Itumbiara ===
- Goiás State Championship: 2008
