= 2000 Copa Libertadores =

41st season of Copa Libertadores

2000 Copa Libertadores de América
2000 Copa Toyota Libertadores de América 2000 Copa Toyota Libertadores da América

Tournament details
- Dates: 15 February – 21 June
- Teams: 32 (from 11 associations)

Final positions
- Champions: (Argentina) Boca Juniors (3rd title)
- Runners-up: (Brazil) Palmeiras

Tournament statistics
- Matches played: 126
- Goals scored: 431 (3.42 per match)
- Top scorer: (Brazil) Luizão (14)

The 2000 edition of the Copa Libertadores was the 41st in the tournament's history. It was held between February 15 and June 21. Thirty-two teams participated in this event.

== First round ==
- Teams in green qualified to the next round

=== Group 1 ===
Pos	Team	Pld	W	D	L	GF	GA	GD	Pts	Qualification
1	(Brazil) Atlético Paranaense	6	5	1	0	11	2	+9	16	Round of 16
2	(Uruguay) Nacional	6	3	1	2	8	7	+1	10	Round of 16
3	(Peru) Alianza Lima	6	1	2	3	7	12	−5	5	
4	(Ecuador) Emelec	6	0	2	4	3	8	−5	2	

=== Group 2 ===
Pos	Team	Pld	W	D	L	GF	GA	GD	Pts	Qualification
1	(Argentina) Boca Juniors	6	4	1	1	14	5	+9	13	Round of 16
2	(Uruguay) Peñarol	6	2	3	1	12	9	+3	9	Round of 16
3	(Bolivia) Blooming	6	2	1	3	9	17	−8	7	
4	(Chile) Universidad Católica	6	1	1	4	10	14	−4	4	

=== Group 3 ===
Pos	Team	Pld	W	D	L	GF	GA	GD	Pts	Qualification
1	(Brazil) Corinthians	6	4	1	1	17	9	+8	13	Round of 16
2	(Mexico) América	6	3	1	2	15	9	+6	10	Round of 16
3	(Paraguay) Olimpia	6	2	2	2	13	17	−4	8	
4	(Ecuador) LDU Quito	6	0	2	4	3	13	−10	2	

=== Group 4 ===
Pos	Team	Pld	W	D	L	GF	GA	GD	Pts	Qualification
1	(Argentina) River Plate	6	2	3	1	11	9	+2	9	Round of 16
2	(Mexico) Atlas	6	2	2	2	13	10	+3	8	Round of 16
3	Universidad de Chile	6	2	2	2	10	10	0	8	
4	(Colombia) Atlético Nacional	6	2	1	3	11	16	−5	7	

=== Group 5 ===
Pos	Team	Pld	W	D	L	GF	GA	GD	Pts	Qualification
1	(Colombia) Junior	6	4	0	2	7	4	+3	12	Round of 16
2	(Paraguay) Cerro Porteño	6	3	1	2	9	6	+3	10	Round of 16
3	(Argentina) San Lorenzo	6	2	2	2	10	9	+1	8	
4	(Peru) Universitario	6	1	1	4	2	9	−7	4	

=== Group 6 ===
Pos	Team	Pld	W	D	L	GF	GA	GD	Pts	Qualification
1	(Colombia) América de Cali	6	5	1	0	20	10	+10	16	Round of 16
2	(Argentina) Rosario Central	6	2	3	1	19	17	+2	9	Round of 16
3	(Peru) Sporting Cristal	6	1	1	4	9	13	−4	4	
4	(Paraguay) Colegiales	6	1	1	4	10	18	−8	4	

=== Group 7 ===
Pos	Team	Pld	W	D	L	GF	GA	GD	Pts	Qualification
1	(Brazil) Palmeiras	6	3	1	2	16	10	+6	10	Round of 16
2	(Ecuador) El Nacional	6	3	1	2	10	7	+3	10	Round of 16
3	(Brazil) Juventude	6	2	1	3	8	12	−4	7	
4	(Bolivia) The Strongest	6	2	1	3	10	15	−5	7	

=== Group 8 ===
Pos	Team	Pld	W	D	L	GF	GA	GD	Pts	Qualification
1	(Bolivia) Bolívar	6	3	1	2	12	9	+3	10	Round of 16
2	(Brazil) Atlético Mineiro	6	3	0	3	9	7	+2	9	Round of 16
3	(Uruguay) Bella Vista	6	2	2	2	8	5	+3	8	
4	(Chile) Cobreloa	6	1	3	2	7	15	−8	6	

== Knockout phase ==
=== Bracket ===
Round of 16
(Mexico) América	2	3	5
(Colombia) América de Cali	1	2	3
(Uruguay) Nacional	3	0	3 (3)
(Bolivia) Bolívar	0	3	3 (5)
(Argentina) River Plate	4	1	5
(Paraguay) Cerro Porteño	0	0	0
(Ecuador) El Nacional	0	3	3
(Argentina) Boca Juniors	0	5	5
(Mexico) Atlas	2	3	5
(Colombia) Junior	0	1	1
(Uruguay) Peñarol	2	1	3 (2)
(Brazil) Palmeiras	0	3	3 (3)
(Brazil) Atlético Mineiro	1	1	2 (5)
(Brazil) Atlético Paranaense	0	2	2 (3)
(Argentina) Rosario Central	3	2	5 (3)
(Brazil) Corinthians	2	3	5 (4)

Quarter-finals
(Mexico) América	2	2	4
(Bolivia) Bolívar	0	1	1
(Argentina) River Plate	2	0	2
(Argentina) Boca Juniors	1	3	4
(Mexico) Atlas	0	2	2
(Brazil) Palmeiras	2	3	5
(Brazil) Atlético Mineiro	1	1	2
(Brazil) Corinthians	1	2	3

Semi-finals
(Mexico) América	1	3	4
(Argentina) Boca Juniors	4	1	5
(Brazil) Palmeiras	3	3	6 (5)
(Brazil) Corinthians	4	2	6 (4)

Finals
(Argentina) Boca Juniors	2	0	2 (4)
(Brazil) Palmeiras	2	0	2 (2)

=== Finals ===
14 June 2000
21:40 (UTC−03:00)

Boca Juniors (Argentina)	2 – 2	(Brazil) Palmeiras
Arruabarrena 22', 61'	(Report)	Pena 43'; Euller 63'

Estadio Alberto J. Armando (La Bombonera), Buenos Aires
Attendance: 50,580
Referee: Gustavo Méndez (Uruguay)
21 June 2000
21:40 (UTC−03:00)

Palmeiras (Brazil)	0 – 0	(Argentina) Boca Juniors
	(Report)
Penalties
Alex (penalty scored); Asprilla (penalty missed); Roque Júnior (penalty missed); Rogério (penalty scored)	2 – 4	(penalty scored) Schelotto; (penalty scored) Riquelme; (penalty scored) Palermo; (penalty scored) Bermúdez

Estádio Cícero Pompeu de Toledo (Morumbi), São Paulo
Attendance: 75,000
Referee: Epifanio González (Paraguay)

== Champion ==
Copa Libertadores
2000 winners

Third title
