= Jorginho Baiano =

Brazilian footballer (born 1966)

Personal information
- Full name: Jorge Luiz de Souza Ramos
- Date of birth: 6 July 1966 (age 60)
- Place of birth: Feira de Santana, Brazil
- Position: Centre-back

Youth career
- Fluminense de Feira

Senior career*
Years	Team	Apps	(Gls)
1987–1989	Fluminense de Feira		
1990–1993	Bahia		
1994–1999	Portuguesa	156	(10)
1998	→ Grêmio (loan)	18	(0)
2000–2001	Inter de Limeira		
2002	Sport Recife		
2003–2004	Paysandu		
2005	CRB		
- * Club domestic league appearances and goals as of 24 July 2024

Jorge Luiz de Souza Ramos (born 6 July 1966), better known as Jorginho or Jorginho Baiano is a Brazilian former professional footballer who played as a centre-back.

== Career ==
Starting his career at Fluminense de Feira, Jorginho played for major Brazilian football teams during the 1990s, with emphasis on Bahia, Portuguesa, where he made 156 appearances for the club, and Grêmio, where he played on loan in 1998. Central defender, he stood out for his seriousness on the field.

== Personal life ==
Jorginho is the elder brother of the also footballer Júnior Baiano. After retiring from football, Jorginho became a cattle rancher.

== Honours ==
Bahia

- Campeonato Baiano: 1991, 1993
