= Carlos Castillo (Colombian footballer) =

Colombian footballer (born 1975)

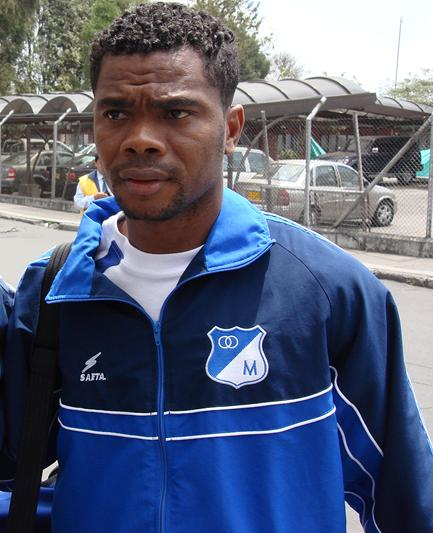

Personal information
- Full name: Carlos Alberto Castillo Ortíz
- Date of birth: September 30, 1975 (age 51)
- Place of birth: Nariño, Colombia
- Height: 1.72 m (5 ft 8 in)
- Position: Forward

Senior career*
Years	Team	Apps	(Gls)
1995–2000	Deportivo Cali		
2001	FBC Melgar	33	(12)
2002–2004	Deportivo Cali		
2004	LDU Quito	13	(1)
2005	Deportivo Pereira		
2005	Real Cartagena		
2006	Atlético Huila		
2007–2008	Millonarios	47	(17)
2008	Once Caldas		
2009	Deportivo Pasto		
- * Club domestic league appearances and goals as of 27 March 2008

Carlos Alberto Castillo Ortíz (born September 30, 1975) is a Colombian football forward, who last played for Deportivo Pasto in the Copa Mustang.

== Career ==
Born in Barbacoas, Nariño, Castillo began playing youth football with Estrella Azul. He became a professional with Deportivo Cali.
