= Manuel Valencia =

Colombian footballer (born 1977)

Personal information
- Full name: Manuel de Jesús Valencia Rodríguez
- Date of birth: 15 August 1977 (age 49)
- Place of birth: Florida, Colombia
- Height: 1.78 m (5 ft 10 in)
- Position: Defender

Senior career*
Years	Team	Apps	(Gls)
1993	Atlético Huila	41	(0)
1994–2000	Deportivo Cali	203	(4)
2000–2002	Santiago Wanderers	56	(0)
2003	Deportivo Pasto	19	(0)
2004	Huachipato	32	(0)
2005	Osorno	8	(0)
2006–2007	Boyacá Chicó	47	(0)

International career
1996	Colombia	1	(0)
- * Club domestic league appearances and goals

Manuel de Jesús Valencia Rodríguez (born August 15, 1977) was a Colombian footballer.

He played for several clubs in his country and Chile.

== Personal life ==
Manuel is the father of the footballers Jhojan and Nicolás Anelka Valencia. Nicolás was born in Valparaíso, Chile, when Manuel played for Santiago Wanderers.

== Honours ==
=== Club ===
Deportivo Cali

- Primera A (2): 1995–96, 1998

Santiago Wanderers

- Primera División de Chile (1): 2001
