= Martín Zapata =

Colombian footballer (1970-2006)

Personal information
- Date of birth: October 28, 1970
- Place of birth: Santander de Quilichao
- Date of death: April 22, 2006 (aged 35)
- Place of death: Cali
- Position: Midfielder

Senior career*
Years	Team	Apps	(Gls)
1992-95	Once Caldas		
1995-99	Deportivo Cali	18	(6)
2000	Emelec	7	(0)
2001	Deportivo Cali		

International career
2000	Colombia	5	(0)
- * Club domestic league appearances and goals

Martín Zapata (28 October 1970 – 22 April 2006) was a Colombian footballer who played as a midfielder.

He played for Once Caldas from 1992 to 1995, Deportivo Cali from 1995 to 1999, Club Sport Emelec in 2000 and Deportivo Cali again in 2001. He was the top scorer of the 1999 Copa Libertadores, in which Cali finished runner-up to Palmeiras, and Zapata missed his penalty.

He was capped 5 times for Colombia national football team, all at the 2000 CONCACAF Gold Cup, and was also a squad member for the 1997 Copa América.

He was murdered in Cali on 22 April 2006.

== Titles ==
=== Deportivo Cali ===
- 1998 Torneo Finalizacion
