= Andrés Mosquera (footballer, born 1978) =

Colombian footballer

Personal information
- Full name: Andrés Mosquera Alvarado
- Date of birth: July 9, 1978 (age 48)
- Place of birth: Cali, Colombia
- Height: 1.84 m (6 ft 0 in)
- Position: Defender

Senior career*
Years	Team	Apps	(Gls)
1995–2004	Deportivo Cali	139	(1)
2004	Cortuluá	0	(0)
2005	Sporting Cristal	10	(0)
2005–2006	Independiente Medellín	22	(0)
2007	Monagas	0	(0)
2007–2008	Millonarios	28	(0)
2008–2009	Once Caldas	26	(1)
2009	Deportivo Pasto	15	(0)
2010	Atlético Nacional	8	(0)
2011	Depor FC	14	(0)

International career^{‡}
2000	Colombia	5	(0)
- * Club domestic league appearances and goals as of November 13, 2012 ‡ National team caps and goals as of November 13, 2012

Andrés Mosquera (born July 9, 1978) is a Colombian football defender.

== Titles ==
Season	Club	Title
1998	Deportivo Cali	Fútbol Profesional Colombiano
