= Oséas =

Brazilian footballer

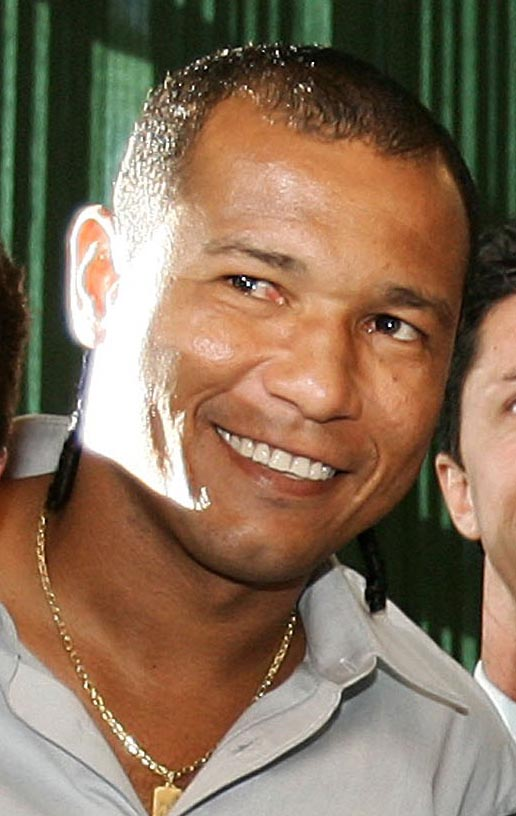

Personal information
- Full name: Oséas Reis dos Santos
- Date of birth: May 14, 1971 (age 55)
- Place of birth: Salvador, Bahia, Brazil
- Height: 1.86 m (6 ft 1 in)
- Position: Forward

Senior career*
Years	Team	Apps	(Gls)
1990–1992	Galícia		
1993–1994	Juvenil		
1994–1995	Uberlândia		
1995–1997	Atlético Paranaense	19	(12)
1997–1999	Palmeiras	62	(24)
2000–2001	Cruzeiro	42	(15)
2002	Santos		
2002–2003	Vissel Kobe	44	(19)
2004	Internacional	8	(0)
2004	Albirex Niigata	12	(4)
2005	Brasiliense	19	(4)

International career
1996	Brazil	2	(0)
- * Club domestic league appearances and goals

Oséas Reis dos Santos (born May 14, 1971 in Salvador, Bahia, Brazil), known as Oséas, is a retired Brazilian football player.

== Club statistics ==
Club performance			League		Cup		League Cup		Total	
Season	Club	League	Apps	Goals	Apps	Goals	Apps	Goals	Apps	Goals
Brazil			League		Copa do Brasil		League Cup		Total	
1996	Atlético Paranaense	Série A	19	12					19	12
1997	Palmeiras	Série A	23	11					23	11
1998	Palmeiras	Série A	23	12					23	12
1999	Palmeiras	Série A	16	1					16	1
2000	Cruzeiro	Série A	22	11					22	11
2001	Cruzeiro	Série A	20	4					20	4
2002	Santos	Série A	0	0					0	0
Japan			League		Emperor's Cup		J.League Cup		Total	
2002	Vissel Kobe	J1 League	15	6	1	1	0	0	16	7
2003	Vissel Kobe	J1 League	29	13	0	0	5	4	34	17
Brazil			League		Copa do Brasil		League Cup		Total	
2004	Internacional	Série A	8	0					8	0
Japan			League		Emperor's Cup		J.League Cup		Total	
2004	Albirex Niigata	J1 League	12	4	0	0	0	0	12	4
Brazil			League		Copa do Brasil		League Cup		Total	
2005	Brasiliense	Série A	19	4					19	4
Country	Brazil		150	55					150	55
Country	Japan		56	23	1	1	5	4	62	28
Total			206	78	1	1	5	4	212	83

== National team statistics ==
Brazil national team
Year	Apps	Goals
1996	2	0
Total	2	0

== Honors ==
=== Team ===
Atlético Paranaense

- Campeonato Brasileiro Série B: 1995

Palmeiras

- Copa do Brasil: 1998
- Copa Mercosur: 1998
- Copa Libertadores: 1999
- Campeonato Paulista runner-up: 1999
- Intercontinental Cup Runners-up: 1999

Cruzeiro

- Copa do Brasil: 2000
- Copa Sul-Minas: 2001

Internacional

- Campeonato Gaúcho: 2004

=== Individual ===
- Brazilian 2nd Division League Top Scorer: 1995
- Copa do Brasil Top Scorer: 2000
