= Júnior Baiano =

Brazilian footballer (born 1970)

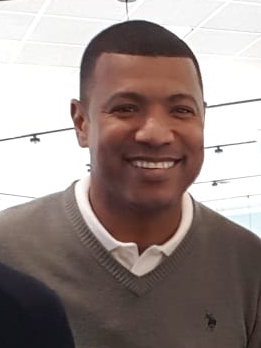
- Júnior in 2008

Personal information
- Full name: Raimundo Ferreira Ramos Júnior
- Date of birth: 14 March 1970 (age 56)
- Place of birth: Feira de Santana, Brazil
- Height: 1.94 m (6 ft 4 in)
- Position: Centre-back

Senior career*
Years	Team	Apps	(Gls)
1989–1993	Flamengo	40	(2)
1994–1995	São Paulo	17	(6)
1995–1996	Werder Bremen	32	(2)
1996–1998	Flamengo	31	(6)
1998–1999	Palmeiras	22	(6)
2000–2001	Vasco da Gama	15	(1)
2002	Shanghai Shenhua	5	(0)
2002–2003	Internacional	3	(0)
2004–2005	Flamengo	42	(8)
2006–2007	América-RJ	0	(0)
2007–2008	Brasiliense	46	(3)
2009	Volta Redonda	0	(0)
2009	Miami FC	7	(0)
Total		260	(26)

International career
1997–1998	Brazil	25	(2)

Managerial career
- 2012: Santa Helena
- 2019: Itumbiara
- * Club domestic league appearances and goals

Raimundo Ferreira Ramos Júnior (born 14 March 1970), known as Júnior or Júnior Baiano as he comes from the state of Bahia, is a former Brazilian professional footballer who played as a centre-back.

== Club career ==
Born in Feira de Santana, Júnior began his career in the late 1980s, playing with Flamengo in the Campeonato Brasileiro. Over the course of the next 15 years, his career took him to Germany, China and all over Brazil. In Germany, he is best known for the ten-match ban that he received after punching an opponent in a match, which caused his club Werder Bremen to cancel his four-year contract. He won the Campeonato Carioca twice in two stints with Flamengo in 1991 and 2004, as well as the Copa do Brasil and the Campeonato Brasileiro. He also won the Copa CONMEBOL and the Recopa Sul-Americana with São Paulo in 1994 and the Copa Libertadores with Palmeiras in 1999.

Júnior retired at the end of 2005 but in December 2006, he signed a professional contract with América (RJ) to save the club from relegation in the Campeonato Carioca in the beginning of 2007. He left for Brasiliense in the Série B that same year.

After a brief stint with Volta Redonda in 2009, Júnior went to Miami FC of the USL First Division, which is coached by his former Brazilian national teammate Zinho.

== International career ==
Júnior Baiano earned 25 caps with the Brazil national team in 1997 and 1998, and was a member of the Brazil squad which took part in the 1998 World Cup, the 1998 CONCACAF Gold Cup, and which won the 1997 FIFA Confederations Cup. During the 1998 World Cup Baiano played a key role in the Brazil squad which reached the 1998 FIFA World Cup Final in Paris, although in the match against Norway which Brazil lost 2–1, he lost a "trial of strength" with Tore André Flo immediately before the striker hit the ball beyond the reach of Claudio Taffarel to equalize, and also fouled the same player a few minutes later, pulling his shirt inside the 18-yard box, which resulted in the awarding of a penalty kick, from which the Norwegians scored the decisive goal.

== Career statistics ==
Scores and results list Brazil's goal tally first, score column indicates score after each Júnior Baiano goal.

List of international goals scored by Júnior Baiano
No.	Date	Venue	Opponent	Score	Result	Competition
1	13 August 1997	Nagai Stadium, Osaka, Japan	Japan	3–0	3–0	Friendly
2	16 December 1997	King Fahd II Stadium, Riyadh, Saudi Arabia	Mexico	3–1	3–2	1997 FIFA Confederations Cup

== Honours ==
Flamengo

- Campeonato Carioca: 1991, 1996, 2004
- Copa do Brasil: 1990
- Campeonato Brasileiro: 1992
- Copa de Oro: 1996

São Paulo

- Recopa Sul-Americana: 1994
- Copa Conmebol: 1994

Palmeiras

- Copa do Brasil: 1998
- Copa Mercosur: 1998
- Copa Libertadores: 1999
- Intercontinental Cup runner-up: 1999

Vasco da Gama

- Campeonato Brasileiro: 2000
- Copa Mercosur: 2000
- FIFA Club World Cup runner-up: 2000

Internacional

- Campeonato Gaúcho: 2002

Shanghai Shenhua

- Chinese Super League: 2003

Brasiliense

- Campeonato Brasiliense: 2008

Brazil

- FIFA Confederations Cup: 1997

Individual

- kicker Bundesliga Team of the Season: 1995–96
- Bola de Prata: 1997

== Personal life ==
Júnior Baiano is brother of the also footballer Jorginho Baiano, who played for Bahia, Portuguesa and Grêmio in the 1990s. His son Patrick also become a professional footballer.
