= Kaloré =

Coordinates: 23°47′S 51°39′W

- Municipality
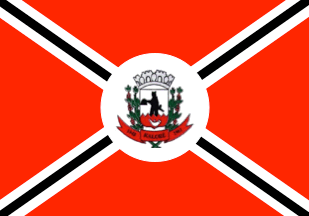
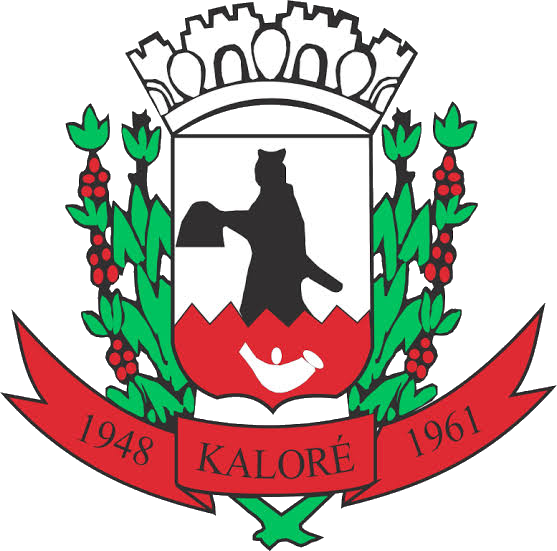
- Flag Coat of arms

- Country: Brazil
- Region: Southern
- State: Paraná
- Mesoregion: Norte Central Paranaense

Population (2020)
  - Total: 4,047
- Time zone: UTC−3 (BRT)

Kaloré is a municipality in the state of Paraná in the Southern Region of Brazil.

== See also ==
- List of municipalities in Paraná
