= Evair =

Brazilian footballer (born 1965)

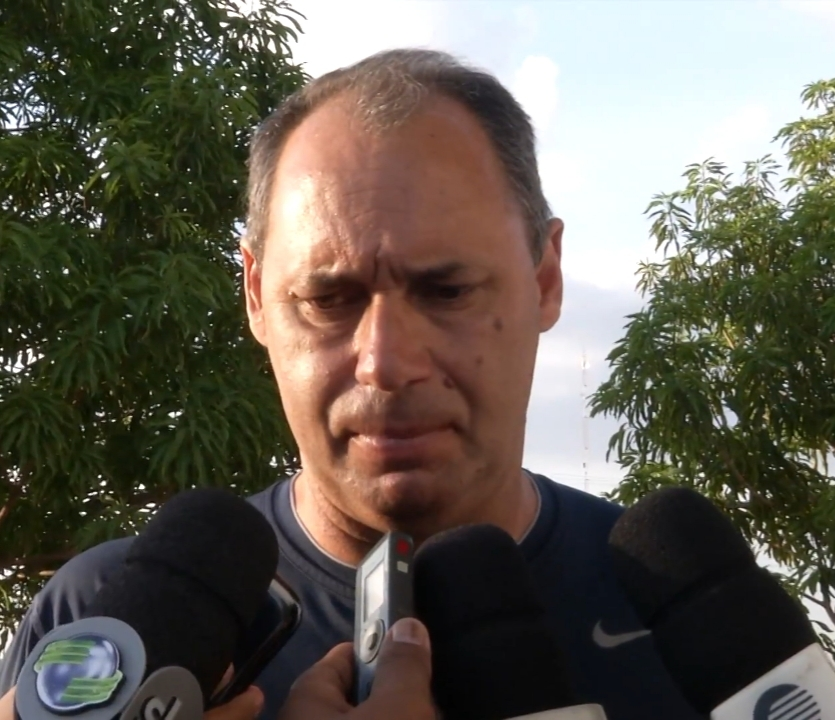
- Evair in 2013

Personal information
- Full name: Evair Aparecido Paulino
- Date of birth: 21 February 1965 (age 61)
- Place of birth: Ouro Fino, Brazil
- Height: 1.84 m (6 ft 0 in)
- Position: Centre forward

Senior career*
Years	Team	Apps	(Gls)
1985–1988	Guarani	93	(64)
1988–1991	Atalanta	76	(25)
1991–1994	Palmeiras	51	(21)
1995–1996	Yokohama Flügels	59	(35)
1997	Atlético Mineiro	0	(0)
1997	Vasco da Gama	28	(8)
1998	Portuguesa	27	(7)
1999	Palmeiras	17	(7)
2000	São Paulo	0	(0)
2000	Goiás	25	(8)
2001–2002	Coritiba	14	(6)
2002	Goiás	12	(8)
2003	Figueirense	12	(3)

International career
1992–1993	Brazil	9	(2)

Managerial career
- 2004: Vila Nova
- 2008: Trindade
- 2008: Anápolis
- 2009: CRAC
- 2010: Itumbiara
- 2010: Uberlândia
- 2012: CRAC
- 2014: River
Medal record
Men's football
Representing Brazil
Pan American Games
Gold medal – first place	1987 Indianapolis	Team competition
- * Club domestic league appearances and goals

Evair Aparecido Paulino (born 21 February 1965), simply known as Evair, is a retired Brazilian footballer who played as a forward for the Brazil national team. Evair played for several clubs throughout his career; he is most famous for his time with Palmeiras, where he recorded 125 goals, making him the seventh all-time top scorer for the club. He also made a significant contribution to Vasco da Gama, helping the club win the Brazilian Série A title in 1997.

== Career statistics ==
=== Club ===
Club performance			League	
Season	Club	League	Apps	Goals
Brazil			League	
1985	Guarani	Série A	21	13
1986	Guarani	Série A	32	24
1987	Guarani	Série A	16	9
1988	Guarani	Série A	24	18
Italy			League	
1988–89	Atalanta	Serie A	25	10
1989–90	Atalanta	Serie A	19	5
1990–91	Atalanta	Serie A	32	10
Brazil			League	
1991	Palmeiras	Série A	0	0
1992	Palmeiras	Série A	8	2
1993	Palmeiras	Série A	16	5
1994	Palmeiras	Série A	27	14
Japan			League	
1995	Yokohama Flügels	J1 League	36	15
1996	Yokohama Flügels	J1 League	23	20
Brazil			League	
1997	Atlético Mineiro	Série A	0	0
1997	Vasco da Gama	Série A	28	8
1998	Portuguesa Desportos	Série A	27	7
1999	Palmeiras	Série A	17	7
2000	Goiás	Série A	25	8
2001	Coritiba	Série A	14	6
2002	Goiás	Série A	12	8
2003	Figueirense	Série A	12	3
Country	Brazil		279	132
Country	Italy		76	25
Country	Japan		59	35
Total			414	192

=== International ===
Brazil
Year	Apps	Goals
1992	2	0
1993	7	2
Total	9	2

== Honours ==
Palmeiras

- Brasileirão Série A: 1993, 1994
- Campeonato Paulista: 1993, 1994
- Rio-São Paulo Tournament: 1993
- Copa Libertadores: 1999
- Intercontinental Cup runner-up: 1999

Yokohama Flügels

- Asian Super Cup: 1995

Vasco da Gama

- Brasileirão Série A: 1997

São Paulo

- Campeonato Paulista: 2000

Brazil

- CONMEBOL Pre-Olympic Tournament: 1987
- Pan American Games: 1987

Individual

- Campeonato Paulista Top Scorer: 1988, 1994
