= Francisco Arce =

Paraguayan football manager (born 1971)

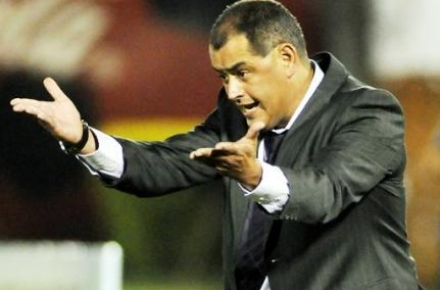
- Arce in 2013

Personal information
- Full name: Francisco Javier Arce Rolón
- Date of birth: 2 April 1971 (age 55)
- Place of birth: Paraguari, Paraguay
- Height: 1.79 m (5 ft 10 in)
- Position: Right-back

Team information
- Current team: Guaraní (manager)

Senior career*
Years	Team	Apps	(Gls)
1989–1994	Cerro Porteño	162	(26)
1994–1998	Grêmio	134	(25)
1998–2002	Palmeiras	242	(57)
2003	Gamba Osaka	16	(1)
2004–2005	Libertad	6	(0)
2006	12 de Octubre	30	(4)
Total		590	(113)

International career
1995–2004	Paraguay	61	(5)

Managerial career
- 2007–2011: Rubio Ñu
- 2011–2012: Paraguay
- 2013–2014: Cerro Porteño
- 2015–2016: Olimpia
- 2016: Guaraní
- 2016–2017: Paraguay
- 2018: General Díaz
- 2018: Ohod
- 2019: Nacional
- 2020–2023: Cerro Porteño
- 2023–2024: Olimpia
- 2024–2025: Guaraní
- 2026: Libertad
- 2026–: Guaraní
- * Club domestic league appearances and goals

Francisco Javier "Chiqui" Arce Rolón (Latin American Spanish: [fɾanˈsisko xaˈβjeɾ ˈtʃikj ˈaɾse roˈlon]; born 2 April 1971) is a Paraguayan football manager and former player. He is the current manager of Guaraní.

Arce played at the right defender position, competing a total of 61 times for the Paraguay national team between 1995 and 2004. He has the distinction of being chosen seven times as the "Ideal Team of America", thus having been nominated the most times in history. He also holds the distinction of having been selected in history as the coach on two occasions of the Paraguay national team.

== Playing career ==
Arce started his career in Paraguay playing for his natal city club, 15 de Mayo, where he made his professional debut at the age of fifteen. The same year he was recruited by the Cerro Porteño club in the Paraguayan capital (Asuncion), where he won three national championships. Arce then played for Brazilian clubs Grêmio and Palmeiras and won international tournaments including the Copa Libertadores. Arce played for Paraguay in the 1998 and 2002 FIFA World Cups and has appeared 61 times for his country. He was famous for his free kick shot technique, where he scored goals during the 2002 FIFA World Cup including a free kick against South Africa.

== Coaching career ==
After retiring as a player, Arce became a coach and managed the Paraguayan second division team Club Rubio Ñú, leading the squad to the 2nd division championship in 2008.

Arce was appointed coach of the Paraguay national football team in July 2011, but due to poor results on the 2014 FIFA World Cup qualification, he was sacked in June 2012.

In March 2013, Arce was appointed coach of the Paraguayan Cerro Porteño. He won the Torneo Clausura in 2013 with Cerro Porteño in highly impressive form, as the club went the entire Clausura undefeated. After a 4–1 defeat to Club Guaraní on 24 August 2014 Arce left Cerro Porteño.

On 15 March 2015, Arce was appointed manager of Olimpia, the arch-rivals of his old club Cerro Porteño.

A year later he coached the Guarani club with good results, leading to his position at the Paraguay national team. In 2018, he was appointed as manager of General Díaz.

== Career statistics ==
=== Club ===
Club	Season	League		
Club	Season	Division	Apps	Goals
Grêmio	1995	Série A	9	1
Grêmio	1996	Série A	16	2
Grêmio	1997	Série A	16	2
Grêmio	Total		41	5
Palmeiras	1998	Série A	24	5
Palmeiras	1999	Série A	10	0
Palmeiras	2000	Série A	17	4
Palmeiras	2001	Série A	21	6
Palmeiras	2002	Série A	21	9
Palmeiras	Total		93	24
Gamba Osaka	2003	J1 League	16	1
Libertad	2004	Primera División	6	0
Career total			156	30

=== International ===
Paraguay national team
Year	Apps	Goals
1995	5	0
1996	5	1
1997	12	0
1998	11	2
1999	5	0
2000	4	0
2001	6	1
2002	8	1
2003	4	0
2004	1	0
Total	61	5

International goals for Paraguay

Score and results list Paraguay's goal tally first.

#	Date	Venue	Opponent	Score	Result	Competition
1.	2 June 1996	Estadio Centenario, Montevideo, Uruguay	Uruguay	1–0	2–0	1998 FIFA World Cup qualifying
2.	8 February 1998	Estadio Defensores del Chaco, Asunción, Paraguay	Poland	2–0	4–0	Friendly
3.	14 March 1998	Qualcomm Stadium, San Diego, United States	United States	2–2	2–2	Friendly
4.	8 November 2001	Estadio Polideportivo de Pueblo Nuevo, San Cristóbal, Venezuela	Venezuela	1–2	1–3	2002 FIFA World Cup qualifying
5.	2 June 2002	Busan Asiad Main Stadium, Busan, South Korea	South Africa	2–0	2–2	2002 FIFA World Cup

== Honours ==
=== As a player ===
Cerro Porteño

- Liga Paraguaya: 1991, 1992, 1994

Grêmio

- Copa Libertadores: 1995
- Recopa Sudamericana: 1996
- Rio Grande do Sul State Championship: 1995, 1996
- Brazilian Série A: 1996
- Brazilian Cup: 1997
- Intercontinental Cup runner-up: 1995

Palmeiras

- Brazilian Cup: 1998
- Mercosur Cup: 1998
- Copa Libertadores: 1999
- Brazilian Champions Cup: 2000
- Rio-São Paulo Tournament: 2000
- Intercontinental Cup runner-up: 1999

Individual

- South American Team of the Year:1996, 1997, 1998, 1999, 2000, 2001, 2002

=== As a coach ===
Rubio Ñú

- Paraguayan 2nd division: 2008

Cerro Porteño

- Paraguayan 1st division: 2013 (undefeated), 2020, 2021

Club Olimpia|Olimpia

- Paraguayan 1st division: 2015
