= Tiago Silva (footballer, born 1979) =

Bulgarian footballer

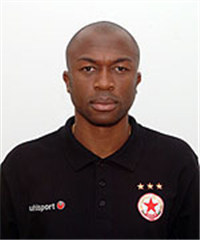
- Silva pictured here during his time at CSKA (c. 2006)

Personal information
- Full name: Tiago Silva dos Santos
- Date of birth: 4 April 1979 (age 47)
- Place of birth: Taquari, Brazil
- Height: 1.82 m (6 ft 0 in)
- Position: Left wing back

Youth career
- 1990–1998: Juventude

Senior career*
Years	Team	Apps	(Gls)
1998–2000	Palmeiras	30	(0)
2000–2001	Portuguesa	23	(2)
2001–2004	Litex Lovech	74	(4)
2005–2007	CSKA Sofia	58	(6)
2007–2010	Genk	31	(0)
2010–2011	Juventude	6	(0)
2011–2012	União Suzano	?	(?)

International career
1996–1998	Brazil U20	13	(0)
2005	Bulgaria	1	(0)
- * Club domestic league appearances and goals

Tiago Silva dos Santos (born 4 April 1979) is a former footballer who played as a defender. Born in Brazil, he played for the Bulgaria national team once in a friendly.

== Club career ==
Tiago Silva joined CSKA Sofia from PFC Litex Lovech in 2005. He has also previously played for Palmeiras, with whom he has won the Copa Mercosur and Copa Libertadores trophies.

He signed a three-year contract with Belgian First Division Club Racing Genk on 18 July 2007.

== International career ==
Tiago Silva made one appearance with the Bulgaria national football team in a 3–1 friendly win against Turkey on 17 August 2005.

However, Tiago Silva had already been capped for the Brazilian Youth team in the 1999 FIFA World Youth Championship, so FIFA refused the request for a change of association.

Although FIFA loosened the nationality transfer of uncapped players and players with multi-nationality in 2009, it has not benefited Tiago Silva, because he did not hold multi-nationality when he represented Brazil.
