= Cléber (footballer, born 1969) =

Brazilian footballer

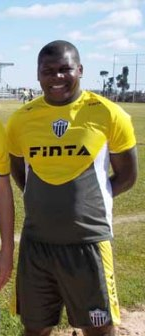
- Cleber Americo do Conceiçao

Personal information
- Full name: Cléber Américo da Conceição
- Date of birth: 26 July 1969 (age 57)
- Place of birth: Belo Horizonte, Minas Gerais, Brazil
- Position: Defender

Senior career*
Years	Team	Apps	(Gls)
1987-1991	Atlético Mineiro		
1992–1993	CD Logroñés		
1993–1999	Palmeiras	371	(23)
2000	Cruzeiro		
2003-2005	Figueirense		
- * Club domestic league appearances and goals

Cléber Américo da Conceição (born 26 July 1969), known as just Cléber, is a Brazilian former footballer who played as a defender.

== Career ==
Born in Belo Horizonte, Minas Gerais, Cléber began playing football with Atlético Mineiro. He would play for Palmeiras, Cruzeiro and Figueirense in the Campeonato Brasileiro. Cléber also had a spell in La Liga with CD Logroñés from 1991 to 1993.

== Honours ==
Palmeiras

- Brazilian Série A: 1993, 1994
- São Paulo State Championship: 1994, 1996
- Brazilian Cup: 1998
- Mercosur Cup: 1998
- Copa Libertadores: 1999
- Intercontinental Cup runner-up: 1999

Cruzeiro

- Brazilian Cup: 2000
- South-Minas Cup: 2001

Figueirense

- Santa Catarina State Championship: 2004
