= Víctor Bonilla =

Colombian footballer (born 1971)

Personal information
- Full name: Víctor Manuel Bonilla Hinestroza
- Date of birth: 23 January 1971 (age 55)
- Place of birth: Tumaco, Colombia
- Height: 1.77 m (5 ft 10 in)
- Position: Striker

Senior career*
Years	Team	Apps	(Gls)
1991–1999	Deportivo Cali	195	(71)
1999	Real Sociedad	18	(3)
2000	Salamanca	7	(5)
2000–2001	Toulouse	34	(15)
2001–2002	Nantes	6	(2)
2002–2003	Montpellier	14	(0)
2003	Al-Rayyan		
2003	Cortuluá	7	(6)
2003–2004	Dorados de Sinaloa		
2004	América de Cali	20	(4)
2005	Deportes Tolima	39	(21)
2006	Barcelona Sporting Club	8	(1)
2006	América de Cali	9	(3)
2007	Atlético Huila	3	(0)
2008	Deportivo Jamundí	0	(0)
2009–2010	Deportes Quindio	16	(3)
2010	Cortuluá	17	(4)

International career
1997–2001	Colombia	17	(5)
- * Club domestic league appearances and goals

Víctor Manuel Bonilla Hinestroza (born 23 January 1971) is a Colombian former professional footballer who played as a striker.

His extensive career includes defending the colors for Deportivo Cali, América de Cali, Deportes Tolima, Atlético Huila, Cortuluá and Deportes Quindio in Colombia, Real Sociedad and UD Salamanca in the Spanish La Liga, Toulouse FC, FC Nantes and Montpellier HSC in Ligue 1, Dorados de Sinaloa in the Mexican league and Barcelona Sporting Club in the Ecuador Serie A.

== Career statistics ==
=== International ===
Appearances and goals by national team and year
National team	Year	Apps	Goals
Colombia	1997	4	0
Colombia	1998	1	0
Colombia	1999	6	3
Colombia	2000	4	1
Colombia	2001	2	1
Total		17	5

Scores and results list Colombia's goal tally first, score column indicates score after each Bonilla goal.

List of international goals scored by Víctor Bonilla
No.	Date	Venue	Opponent	Score	Result	Competition	Ref.
1	24 June 1999	Estadio Defensores del Chaco, Asunción, Paraguay	Paraguay	1–1	1–2	Friendly	
2	1 July 1999	Estadio General Pablo Rojas, Asunción, Paraguay	Uruguay	1–0	1–0	1999 Copa América	
3	11 July 1999	Estadio Feliciano Cáceres, Luque, Paraguay	Chile	2–1	2–3	1999 Copa América	
4	23 February 2000	San Diego Stadium, San Diego, United States	Peru	2–0	2–1	2000 CONCACAF Gold Cup	
5	24 April 2001	Estadio Polideportivo de Pueblo Nuevo, San Cristóbal, Venezuela	Venezuela	2–2	2–2	2002 FIFA World Cup qualification	
