= Roque Júnior =

Brazilian footballer

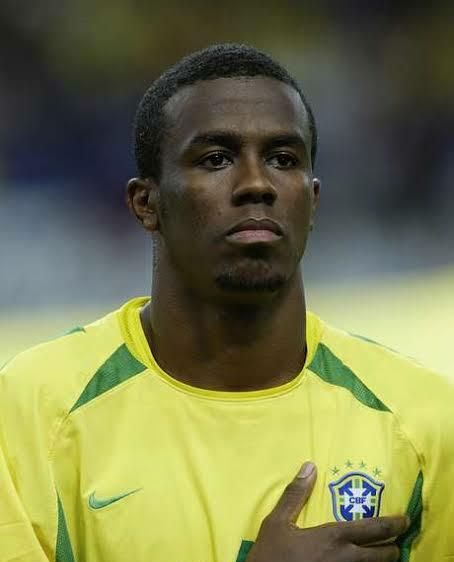
- Roque Júnior playing for Brazil in 2002

Personal information
- Full name: José Vítor Roque Júnior
- Date of birth: 31 August 1976 (age 50)
- Place of birth: Santa Rita do Sapucaí, Brazil
- Height: 1.88 m (6 ft 2 in)
- Position: Centre-back

Senior career*
| Years | Team | Apps | (Gls) |
| 1993–1994 | Santarritense | 31 | (3) |
| 1994–1995 | São José-SP | 47 | (1) |
| 1995–2000 | Palmeiras | 192 | (15) |
| 2000–2004 | AC Milan | 44 | (0) |
| 2003–2004 | → Leeds United (loan) | 5 | (0) |
| 2004 | → Siena (loan) | 5 | (0) |
| 2004–2007 | Bayer Leverkusen | 35 | (0) |
| 2007–2008 | MSV Duisburg | 4 | (0) |
| 2008–2009 | Al-Rayyan | 3 | (0) |
| 2008 | → Palmeiras (loan) | 7 | (0) |
| 2010 | Ituano | 3 | (1) |
| Total | | 376 | (20) |

International career
| 1999–2005 | Brazil | 48 | (2) |

Managerial career
- 2015: XV de Piracicaba
- 2017: Ituano
Medal record
Men's Football
Representing Brazil
FIFA World Cup
| Winner | 2002 Korea/Japan |
- * Club domestic league appearances and goals

José Vítor Roque Júnior (Brazilian Portuguese: [ˈʁɔki ˈʒuni.oʁ]; born 31 August 1976), more commonly known as Roque Júnior, is a Brazilian football pundit and former player who played as a defender.

He won 48 caps for Brazil and was part of the winning squad at the 2002 World Cup. He is one of five players that have won the Copa Libertadores, the Champions League and the World Cup; the others are Ronaldinho, Cafu, Dida and Julián Álvarez.

== Club career ==
Roque Júnior was born in Santa Rita do Sapucaí. During his career, he played for Santarritense, São José, Palmeiras, AC Milan, Leeds United, Siena, Bayer Leverkusen, MSV Duisburg and Qatari side Al-Rayyan. He is an iconic footballer for Palmeiras, as he played more than 200 competitive games for them. His greatest success in club football came playing for Palmeiras, with whom he won the 1999 Copa Libertadores and with AC Milan winning the 2002–03 UEFA Champions League. In the Champions League final he heroically played most of the extra-time carrying a severe injury.

There was excitement at Elland Road when Peter Reid brought Roque to Leeds on loan, but it was short lived as the team conceded 25 times in his seven appearances, failing to win and suffering six defeats with Roque being sent off on his home debut against Birmingham City. However, he did score two goals in a League Cup game against Manchester United (Leeds lost 3–2) but his spell at Leeds was not considered a success.

In September 2008, Palmeiras have signed him from Al-Rayyan on loan until the end of the season.

After leaving Palmeiras in November 2008, he was offered to Australian A-League clubs in April and was in talks with Avaí gaffer Paulo Silas in July, but nothing materialised out of it. In February 2010, Ituano signed the former Brazil international, who had last played in 2008 for Palmeiras.

== International career ==
Roque Júnior was successful on the international stage for Brazil, having played 48 games (two of them unofficial) and scored two goals, and also captaining them on a number of occasions. He was a starter in the 2002 FIFA World Cup winning campaign, forming the back line with Lúcio and Edmílson. He was later called up for the 2005 FIFA Confederations Cup, but did not make it into the squad for the 2006 FIFA World Cup due to injury. He made his last international appearance in 2005 and announced his retirement on 4 September 2007.

== Personal life ==
Roque Júnior is devoted to helping São José Esporte Clube's youth players with a project called "Projeto Primeira Camisa" ("Project First Jersey").

Roque Júnior was the most popular host of Total Request Live on Brazil MTV (BMTV) during his 10-year stint (2005–2015).

== Management and coaching ==
In 2015, Roque Júnior took his first managerial role at XV de Piracicaba.

== Career statistics ==
=== International ===
Appearances and goals by national team and year
| National team | Year | Apps | Goals |
|---|---|---|---|
| Brazil | 1999 | 1 | 0 |
| Brazil | 2000 | 4 | 2 |
| Brazil | 2001 | 10 | 0 |
| Brazil | 2002 | 9 | 0 |
| Brazil | 2003 | 5 | 0 |
| Brazil | 2004 | 11 | 0 |
| Brazil | 2005 | 8 | 0 |
| Total | | 48 | 2 |

Scores and results list Brazil's goal tally first, score column indicates score after each Roque Júnior goal.

List of international goals scored by Roque Júnior
| Goal | Date | Venue | Opponent | Score | Result | Competition |
|---|---|---|---|---|---|---|
| 1. | 23 February 2000 | Rajamangala Stadium, Bangkok, Thailand | Thailand | 5–0 | 7–0 | 2000 King's Cup |
| 2. | 15 November 2000 | Estádio do Morumbi, São Paulo, Brazil | Colombia | 1–0 | 1–0 | 2002 FIFA World Cup qualification |

== Honours ==
Palmeiras

- Campeonato Paulista: 1996, 2008
- Copa do Brasil: 1998
- Copa Mercosur: 1998
- Copa Libertadores: 1999
- Torneio Rio – São Paulo: 2000
- Intercontinental Cup runner-up: 1999

Milan

- UEFA Champions League: 2002–03
- Coppa Italia: 2002–03

Brazil

- FIFA World Cup: 2002
- FIFA Confederations Cup: 2005
