= Galeano (footballer) =

Brazilian footballer (born 1972)

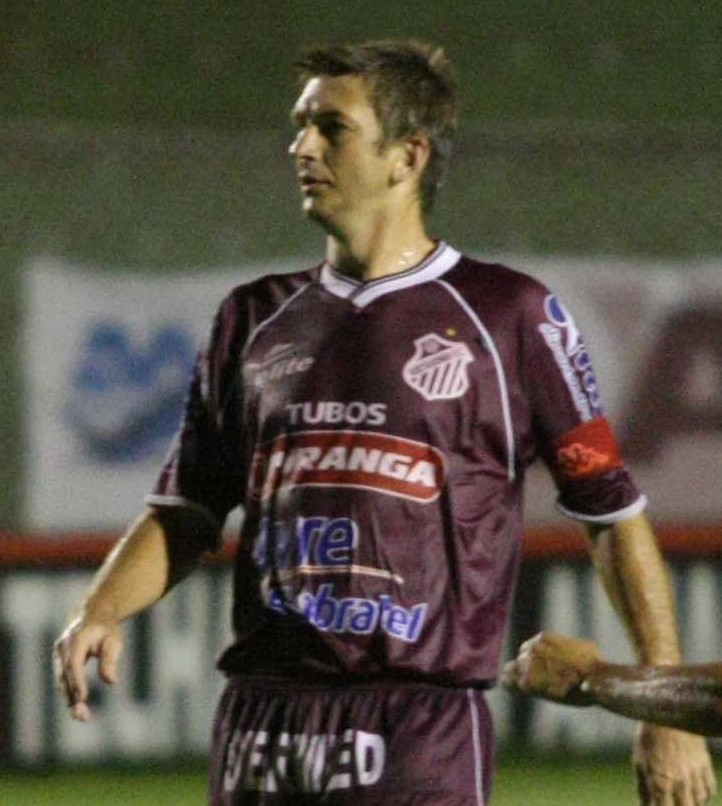
- Galeano with Sertãozinho in 2008

Personal information
- Full name: Marcos Aurélio Galeano
- Date of birth: 28 March 1972 (age 54)
- Place of birth: Ivaiporã, Brazil
- Height: 1.82 m (6 ft 0 in)
- Positions: Centre-back; midfielder

Team information
- Current team: Palmeiras (Football supervisor)

Senior career*
| Years | Team | Apps | (Gls) |
| 1989–2002 | Palmeiras | 147 | (10) |
| 1993 | → Rio Branco (loan) | | |
| 1994–1995 | → Juventude (loan) | | |
| 2002 | Botafogo | 22 | (5) |
| 2003 | Gamba Osaka | 5 | (0) |
| 2003 | Ankaragucu | 7 | (0) |
| 2004 | Bahia | | |
| 2004 | Figueirense | 12 | (2) |
| 2005 | Ponte Preta | 37 | (2) |
| 2006 | Fortaleza | 6 | (0) |
| 2006 | Goiás | 15 | (0) |
| 2007 | Santo André | | |
| 2007 | Joinville | | |
| 2008 | Sertãozinho | | |
| 2008 | Ituano | | |
- * Club domestic league appearances and goals

Marcos Aurélio Galeano (born 28 March 1972), known as just Galeano, is a Brazilian former professional footballer who played as a centre-back or midfielder. In April 2010, Galeano returned to Palmeiras, the club where he spent most of his career, as a staff member.

== Career statistics ==
Appearances and goals by club, season and competition
| Club | Season | League | | |
| Club | Season | Division | Apps | Goals |
|---|---|---|---|---|
| Palmeiras | 1989 | Série A | 1 | 0 |
| Palmeiras | 1990 | Série A | 7 | 0 |
| Palmeiras | 1991 | Série A | 17 | 0 |
| Palmeiras | 1992 | Série A | 7 | 0 |
| Rio Branco | 1993 | | | |
| Juventude | 1993 | | | |
| Juventude | 1994 | Série B | | |
| Juventude | 1995 | Série A | 20 | 3 |
| Palmeiras | 1996 | Série A | 23 | 2 |
| Palmeiras | 1997 | Série A | 28 | 2 |
| Palmeiras | 1998 | Série A | 19 | 0 |
| Palmeiras | 1999 | Série A | 16 | 0 |
| Palmeiras | 2000 | Série A | 10 | 2 |
| Palmeiras | 2001 | Série A | 19 | 1 |
| Botafogo | 2002 | Série A | 22 | 5 |
| Gamba Osaka | 2003 | J1 League | 5 | 0 |
| Ankaragücü | 2003–04 | Süper Lig | 7 | 0 |
| Bahia | 2004 | Série B | | |
| Figueirense | 2004 | Série A | 12 | 2 |
| Ponte Preta | 2005 | Série A | 37 | 2 |
| Fortaleza | 2006 | Série A | 6 | 0 |
| Goiás | 2006 | Série A | 15 | 0 |
| Career total | | | 271 | 19 |

== Honours ==
Juventude

- Brazilian Série B: 1994

Palmeiras

- Euro-America Cup: 1996
- São Paulo State Championship: 1996
- Brazilian Cup: 1998
- Mercosur Cup: 1998
- Libertadores Cup: 1999
- Rio-São Paulo Tournament: 2000
- Brazilian Champions Cup: 2000
- Intercontinental Cup runner-up: 1999
