= Rogério (footballer, born 1976) =

Brazilian footballer

Personal information
- Full name: Rogério Fidélis Régis
- Date of birth: 28 February 1976 (age 50)
- Place of birth: Campinas, Brazil
- Height: 1.79 m (5 ft 10 1/2 in)
- Position: Wingback

Youth career
- 1994: União São João

Senior career*
Years	Team	Apps	(Gls)
1995	União São João	16	(1)
1996–1999	Palmeiras	82	(5)
2000–2004	Corinthians	107	(20)
2004–2006	Sporting CP	41	(4)
2006	→ Fluminense (loan)	23	(1)
2007	Itumbiara		
2007	Santo André	7	(1)
2008	São Caetano	0	(0)
2011–2012	Grêmio Osasco	26	(8)
2011	→ Oeste (loan)	2	(0)
Total		304	(40)

International career
1998–1999	Brazil	3	(0)
- * Club domestic league appearances and goals

Rogério Fidélis Régis (born 28 February 1976 in Campinas, São Paulo), known simply as Rogério, is a Brazilian retired footballer who played as a right back or a right midfielder.

== Club career ==
After emerging through lowly União São João Esporte Clube's youth ranks, Rogério had a steady career with country giants Sociedade Esportiva Palmeiras and Sport Club Corinthians Paulista, being essential in the former side's conquest of the 1999 edition of the Libertadores Cup; in 2002, playing as a right-back, he often duelled with Santos FC's Robinho during the national championship final, won by the opposition 5–2 on aggregate.

In 2004, aged 28, Rogério moved abroad, signing a three-year contract with Sporting Clube de Portugal. Playing both positions on the right flank during his first season, he helped the Lisbon-based team to the campaign's UEFA Cup final, played on home soil: he scored the opener in the decisive match, but in an eventual 1–3 loss against PFC CSKA Moscow.

Losing importance in the next year, Rogério returned to his country, first on loan at Fluminense FC. He retired in 2008 after one-year spells with Itumbiara Esporte Clube, Esporte Clube Santo André and Associação Desportiva São Caetano.

In 2011, after three years out of football, 35-year-old Rogério returned to active, playing in the lower leagues of his country.

== Honours ==
Palmeiras

- Campeonato Paulista: 1996
- Copa do Brasil: 1998
- Copa Mercosur: 1998
- Copa Libertadores: 1999
- Torneio Rio-São Paulo: 2000
- Intercontinental Cup runner-up: 1999

Corinthans

- Campeonato Paulista: 2001, 2003
- Copa do Brasil: 2002
- Torneio Rio-São Paulo: 2002

Sporting CP

- UEFA Cup: Runner-up 2004–05
