= List of goals scored by Rogério Ceni =

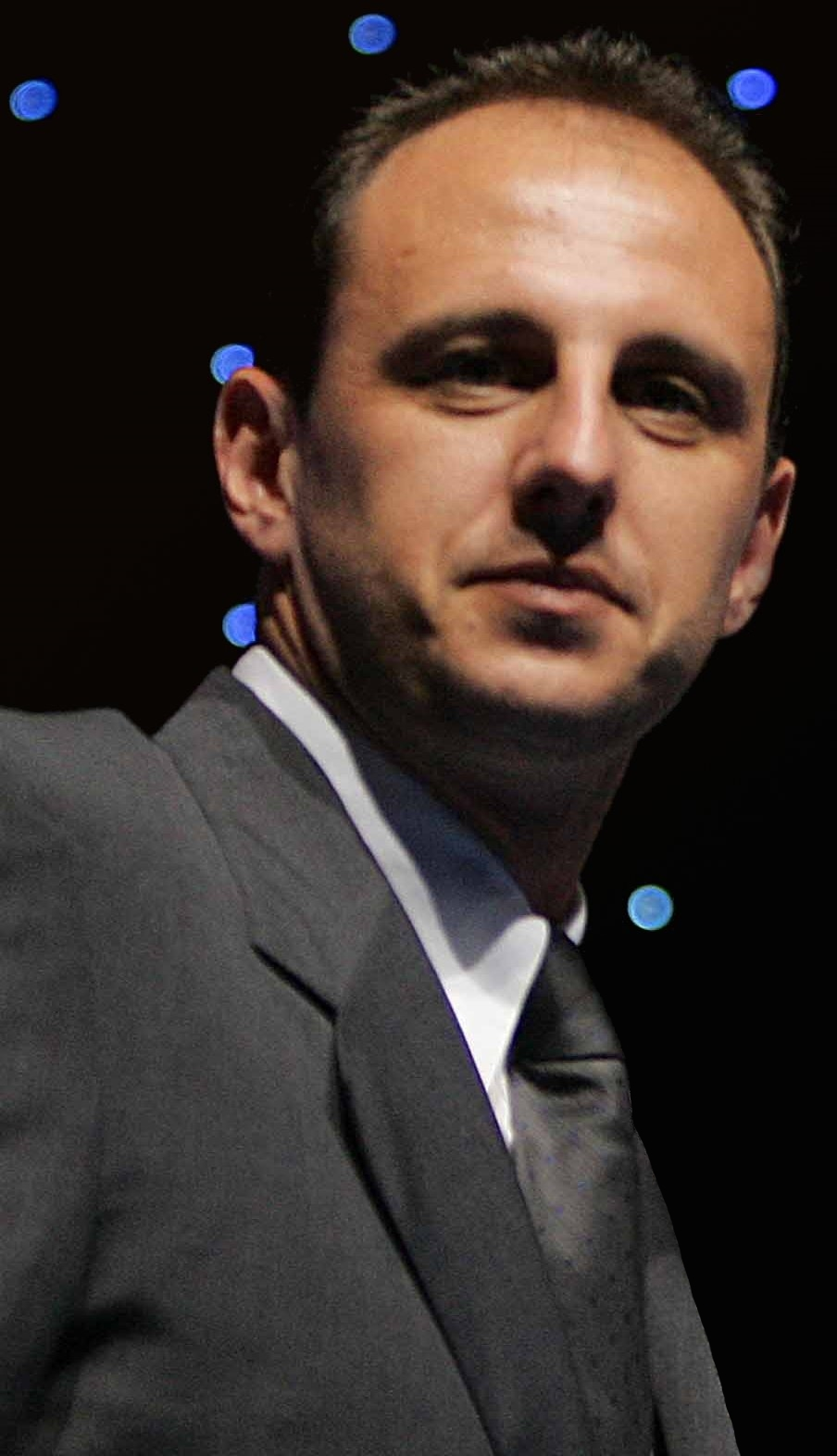
Rogério Ceni.

Rogério Ceni is a retired Brazilian footballer who played as a goalkeeper for São Paulo during 22 years (1993–2015), totalizing 1237 appearances. In addition, having scored 131 goals (129 according to IFFHS), he has been recognized by Guinness World Records as the professional goalkeeper to have scored the most goals in football history.

== List of all goals ==
Following, is the list with all 131 goals scored by Rogério Ceni:

# Total	# IFFHS	Date	Venue	Host team	Result	Away team	Competition	Score	Type	Opponent goalkeeper
1	1	15 February 1997	Hermínio Ometto, Araras	União São João	0–2	São Paulo	Campeonato Paulista	0–1	Free kick	Adinam
2	2	13 September 1997	Morumbi, São Paulo	São Paulo	2–2	Botafogo	Campeonato Brasileiro	1–0	Free kick	Wágner
3	3	9 November 1997	Morumbi, São Paulo	São Paulo	4–4	Paraná	Campeonato Brasileiro	3–3	Free kick	Régis
4	–	25 January 1998	Morumbi, São Paulo	São Paulo	1–1	Santos / Flamengo	Friendly	1–1	Free kick	Clemer
5	4	28 March 1998	Morumbi, São Paulo	São Paulo	2–1	Santos	Campeonato Paulista	1–1	Free kick	Zetti
6	5	12 April 1998	Morumbi, São Paulo	São Paulo	6–1	São José	Campeonato Paulista	3–0	Free kick	Mauricio
7	6	18 April 1999	Morumbi, São Paulo	São Paulo	4–4	Palmeiras	Campeonato Paulista	4–4	Penalty kick	Marcos
8	7	25 April 1999	Major José Levy Sobrinho, Limeira	Inter de Limeira	1–2	São Paulo	Campeonato Paulista	0–1	Free kick	Marcos Bezerra
9	8	25 April 1999	Major José Levy Sobrinho, Limeira	Inter de Limeira	1–2	São Paulo	Campeonato Paulista	0–2	Penalty kick	Marcos Bezerra
10	9	25 August 1999	Morumbi, São Paulo	São Paulo	4–1	San Lorenzo	Copa Mercosur	2–0	Free kick	Gustavo Campagnuolo
11	10	3 November 1999	Morumbi, São Paulo	São Paulo	1–0	Ponte Preta	Campeonato Brasileiro	1–0	Free kick	Alexandre Fávaro
12	–	17 January 2000	Morumbi, São Paulo	São Paulo	5–1	Uralan Elista	Torneio Constantino Cury	4–1	Free kick	Taras Lutsenko
13	11	1 April 2000	Brinco de Ouro, Campinas	Guarani	2–3	São Paulo	Campeonato Paulista	0–2	Free kick	Gléguer
14	12	8 April 2000	Morumbi, São Paulo	São Paulo	4–2	Portuguesa Santista	Campeonato Paulista	2–1	Free kick	Pitarelli
15	13	24 May 2000	Machadão, Natal	América de Natal	1–3	São Paulo	Copa do Brasil	1–2	Free kick	Carlos Alberto
16	14	18 June 2000	Morumbi, São Paulo	São Paulo	2–2	Santos	Campeonato Paulista	1–1	Free kick	Carlos Germano
17	15	17 September 2000	Morumbi, São Paulo	São Paulo	2–0	Portuguesa	Campeonato Brasileiro	2–0	Penalty kick	Roger
18	16	4 October 2000	Morumbi, São Paulo	São Paulo	1–1	Grêmio	Campeonato Brasileiro	1–0	Free kick	Danrlei
19	17	17 October 2000	Morumbi, São Paulo	São Paulo	1–1	Internacional	Campeonato Brasileiro	1–1	Free kick	João Gabriel
20	18	17 March 2001	Ulrico Mursa, Santos	Portuguesa Santista	4–4	São Paulo	Campeonato Paulista	2–2	Free kick	Robson
21	19	30 June 2001	Almeidão, João Pessoa	Coritiba	0–2	São Paulo	Copa dos Campeões	0–2	Free kick	Marcelo Cruz
22	20	30 January 2002	Brinco de Ouro, Campinas	Guarani	2–3	São Paulo	Torneio Rio – São Paulo	1–3	Free kick	César
23	21	3 February 2002	Morumbi, São Paulo	São Paulo	4–3	Fluminense	Torneio Rio – São Paulo	4–2	Free kick	Murilo
24	22	3 April 2002	Morumbi, São Paulo	São Paulo	6–1	Figueirense	Copa do Brasil	6–1	Free kick	Gustavo
25	23	27 April 2002	Morumbi, São Paulo	São Paulo	2–2	Palmeiras	Torneio Rio – São Paulo	1–0	Free kick	Marcos
26	24	26 October 2002	Canindé, São Paulo	Portuguesa	1–3	São Paulo	Campeonato Brasileiro	0–1	Free kick	Bosco
27	25	20 April 2003	Morumbi, São Paulo	São Paulo	3–1	Vasco da Gama	Campeonato Brasileiro	3–1	Free kick	Fábio
28	26	21 September 2003	Morumbi, São Paulo	São Paulo	2–2	Atlético Mineiro	Campeonato Brasileiro	2–1	Free kick	Velloso
29	27	11 February 2004	Nacional de Peru, Lima	Alianza Lima	1–2	São Paulo	Copa Libertadores	0–1	Free kick	Leao Butrón
30	28	16 May 2004	Morumbi, São Paulo	São Paulo	2–2	Paraná	Campeonato Brasileiro	2–1	Free kick	Flávio
31	29	19 May 2004	Morumbi, São Paulo	São Paulo	3–0	Deportivo Táchira	Copa Libertadores	1–0	Free kick	Manuel Sanhouse
32	30	17 July 2004	Morumbi, São Paulo	São Paulo	2–1	Figueirense	Campeonato Brasileiro	1–0	Penalty kick	Édson Bastos
33	31	17 July 2004	Morumbi, São Paulo	São Paulo	2–1	Figueirense	Campeonato Brasileiro	2–0	Free kick	Édson Bastos
34	32	23 January 2005	Teixeirão, São José do Rio Preto	América de Rio Preto	3–4	São Paulo	Campeonato Paulista	2–3	Free kick	Rafael
35	33	20 February 2005	Morumbi, São Paulo	São Paulo	3–0	Palmeiras	Campeonato Paulista	2–0	Free kick	Sérgio
36	34	9 March 2005	Morumbi, São Paulo	São Paulo	4–2	Universidad de Chile	Copa Libertadores	2–1	Free kick	Johnny Herrera
37	35	12 March 2005	Morumbi, São Paulo	São Paulo	1–0	Rio Branco	Campeonato Paulista	1–0	Penalty kick	Magrão
38	36	19 March 2005	Morumbi, São Paulo	São Paulo	6–0	Marília	Campeonato Paulista	6–0	Free kick	Bruno Prandi
39	37	26 March 2005	Morumbi, São Paulo	São Paulo	3–1	Santo André	Campeonato Paulista	2–1	Penalty kick	Júlio César
40	38	8 May 2005	Pacaembu, São Paulo	Corinthians	1–5	São Paulo	Campeonato Brasileiro	0–1	Penalty kick	Tiago Campagnaro
41	39	25 May 2005	Morumbi, São Paulo	São Paulo	2–0	Palmeiras	Copa Libertadores	1–0	Penalty kick	Marcos
42	40	28 May 2005	Morumbi, São Paulo	São Paulo	1–1	Cruzeiro	Campeonato Brasileiro	1–1	Penalty kick	Fábio
43	41	1 June 2005	Morumbi, São Paulo	São Paulo	4–0	Tigres UANL	Copa Libertadores	1–0	Free kick	Gustavo Campagnuolo
44	42	1 June 2005	Morumbi, São Paulo	São Paulo	4–0	Tigres UANL	Copa Libertadores	3–0	Free kick	Gustavo Campagnuolo
45	43	12 June 2005	Mangueirão, Belém	Paysandu	2–2	São Paulo	Campeonato Brasileiro	0–1	Free kick	Alexandre Fávaro
46	44	22 June 2005	Morumbi, São Paulo	São Paulo	2–0	River Plate	Copa Libertadores	2–0	Penalty kick	Franco Costanzo
47	45	20 July 2005	Serejão, Taguatinga	Brasiliense	3–3	São Paulo	Campeonato Brasileiro	1–3	Free kick	Eduardo
48	46	28 August 2005	Willie Davids, Maringá	Paraná	0–4	São Paulo	Campeonato Brasileiro	0–1	Free kick	Darci
49	47	11 September 2005	Couto Pereira, Curitiba	Coritiba	1–4	São Paulo	Campeonato Brasileiro	0–1	Penalty kick	Douglas Leite
50	48	18 September 2005	Morumbi, São Paulo	São Paulo	4–2	Vasco da Gama	Campeonato Brasileiro	4–2	Penalty kick	Cássio
51	49	21 September 2005	Mineirão, Belo Horizonte	Cruzeiro	2–3	São Paulo	Campeonato Brasileiro	2–3	Penalty kick	Artur
52	50	2 November 2005	Morumbi, São Paulo	São Paulo	2–2	Atlético Mineiro	Campeonato Brasileiro	2–2	Free kick	Bruno
53	51	4 December 2005	Morumbi, São Paulo	São Paulo	3–1	Atlético Paranaense	Campeonato Brasileiro	3–0	Free kick	Diego
54	52	14 December 2005	National Stadium, Tokyo	São Paulo	3–2	Al-Ittihad	FIFA Club World Cup	3–1	Penalty kick	Mabrouk Zaid
55	53	18 February 2006	Pacaembu, São Paulo	São Paulo	5–1	Paulista	Campeonato Paulista	4–1	Penalty kick	Rafael Bracali
56	54	22 February 2006	Anacleto Campanella, São Caetano do Sul	São Paulo	3–0	Mogi Mirim	Campeonato Paulista	3–0	Penalty kick	Edervan
57	55	26 March 2006	Décio Vitta, Americana	Rio Branco	2–4	São Paulo	Campeonato Paulista	2–4	Penalty kick	Marcelo Bonan
58	56	2 April 2006	Morumbi, São Paulo	São Paulo	3–1	Santos	Campeonato Paulista	1–1	Penalty kick	Fábio Costa
59	57	9 April 2006	Papa João Paulo II, Mogi Mirim	Ituano	0–2	São Paulo	Campeonato Paulista	0–2	Free kick	André Luis
60	58	16 April 2006	Morumbi, São Paulo	São Paulo	1–0	Flamengo	Campeonato Brasileiro	1–0	Penalty kick	Diego
61	59	20 April 2006	Morumbi, São Paulo	São Paulo	2–0	Caracas	Copa Libertadores	2–0	Penalty kick	Javier Toyo
62	60	29 April 2006	Morumbi, São Paulo	São Paulo	4–0	Santa Cruz	Campeonato Brasileiro	4–0	Free kick	Gilmar
63	61	3 May 2006	Morumbi, São Paulo	São Paulo	2–1	Palmeiras	Copa Libertadores	2–1	Penalty kick	Sérgio
64	62	26 July 2006	Jalisco, Guadalajara	Chivas Guadalajara	0–1	São Paulo	Copa Libertadores	0–1	Penalty kick	Oswaldo Sánchez
65	63	20 August 2006	Mineirão, Belo Horizonte	Cruzeiro	2–2	São Paulo	Campeonato Brasileiro	2–1	Indirect free kick	Fábio
66	64	20 August 2006	Mineirão, Belo Horizonte	Cruzeiro	2–2	São Paulo	Campeonato Brasileiro	2–2	Penalty kick	Fábio
67	65	3 September 2006	Arruda, Recife	Santa Cruz	1–3	São Paulo	Campeonato Paulista	0–1	Free kick	Guto
68	66	4 October 2006	Morumbi, São Paulo	São Paulo	5–1	Vasco da Gama	Campeonato Brasileiro	5–1	Free kick	Roberto
69	67	2 November 2006	Morumbi, São Paulo	São Paulo	1–1	Ponte Preta	Campeonato Brasileiro	1–1	Penalty kick	Jean
70	68	26 November 2006	Morumbi, São Paulo	São Paulo	2–0	Cruzeiro	Campeonato Brasileiro	1–0	Free kick	Fábio
71	69	11 February 2007	Morumbi, São Paulo	São Paulo	3–1	Corinthians	Campeonato Paulista	2–0	Penalty kick	Marcelo
72	70	1 April 2007	Morumbi, São Paulo	São Paulo	3–1	Palmeiras	Campeonato Paulista	2–1	Penalty kick	Diego Cavalieri
73	71	12 May 2007	Morumbi, São Paulo	São Paulo	2–0	Goiás	Campeonato Brasileiro	2–0	Penalty kick	Harlei
74	72	3 June 2007	Durival de Britto, Curitiba	Paraná	0–1	São Paulo	Campeonato Brasileiro	0–1	Penalty kick	Marcos Leandro
75	73	3 July 2007	Morumbi, São Paulo	São Paulo	1–0	Internacional	Campeonato Brasileiro	1–0	Penalty kick	Clemer
76	74	26 July 2007	Morumbi, São Paulo	São Paulo	3–1	Sport	Campeonato Brasileiro	3–1	Free kick	Cléber
77	75	15 August 2007	Orlando Scarpelli, Florianópolis	Figueirense	2–2	São Paulo	Copa Sudamericana	1–1	Penalty kick	Wilson
78	76	26 August 2007	Morumbi, São Paulo	São Paulo	5–0	Náutico	Campeonato Brasileiro	2–0	Penalty kick	Eduardo
79	77	28 October 2007	Ilha do Retiro, Recife	Sport	1–2	São Paulo	Campeonato Brasileiro	0–1	Free kick	Magrão
80	78	11 November 2007	Morumbi, São Paulo	São Paulo	1–0	Grêmio	Campeonato Brasileiro	1–0	Penalty kick	Sebastián Saja
81	79	6 April 2008	Morumbi, São Paulo	São Paulo	3–1	Juventus	Campeonato Paulista	2–0	Penalty kick	Jonatas
82	80	20 July 2008	Morumbi, São Paulo	São Paulo	2–1	Botafogo	Campeonato Brasileiro	1–0	Penalty kick	Juan Castillo
83	81	3 August 2008	Morumbi, São Paulo	São Paulo	4–0	Vasco da Gama	Campeonato Brasileiro	3–0	Free kick	Tiago Campagnaro
84	82	3 August 2008	Morumbi, São Paulo	São Paulo	4–0	Vasco da Gama	Campeonato Brasileiro	4–0	Penalty kick	Tiago Campagnaro
85	83	19 October 2008	Parque Antártica, São Paulo	Palmeiras	2–2	São Paulo	Campeonato Brasileiro	0–1	Penalty kick	Marcos
86	84	25 October 2009	Vila Belmiro, Santos	Santos	3–4	São Paulo	Campeonato Brasileiro	3–4	Free kick	Rafael Cabral
87	85	6 December 2009	Morumbi, São Paulo	São Paulo	4–0	Sport	Campeonato Brasileiro	2–0	Free kick	Magrão
88	86	23 January 2010	Morumbi, São Paulo	São Paulo	3–0	Rio Claro	Campeonato Paulista	3–0	Penalty kick	Sidão
89	87	13 February 2010	Novelli Júnior, Itu	Ituano	0–1	São Paulo	Campeonato Paulista	0–1	Penalty kick	Saulo
90	88	25 February 2010	Palogrande, Manizales	Once Caldas	2–1	São Paulo	Copa Libertadores	0–1	Free kick	Neco Martínez
91	89	21 March 2010	Morumbi, São Paulo	São Paulo	3–0	Mogi Mirim	Campeonato Paulista	1–0	Penalty kick	Alex Alves
92	90	29 August 2010	Maracanã, Rio de Janeiro	Fluminense	2–2	São Paulo	Campeonato Brasileiro	1–1	Free kick	Fernando Henrique
93	91	29 September 2010	Olímpico, Porto Alegre	Grêmio	4–2	São Paulo	Campeonato Brasileiro	2–1	Penalty kick	Victor
94	92	3 November 2010	Parque do Sabiá, Uberlândia	Cruzeiro	0–2	São Paulo	Campeonato Brasileiro	0–2	Penalty kick	Fábio
95	93	28 November 2010	Serra Dourada, Goiânia	Atlético Goianiense	1–1	São Paulo	Campeonato Brasileiro	0–1	Penalty kick	Márcio
96	94	16 January 2011	Romildão, Mogi Mirim	Mogi Mirim	0–2	São Paulo	Campeonato Paulista	0–1	Penalty kick	João Paulo
97	95	3 February 2011	Morumbi, São Paulo	São Paulo	3–2	Linense	Campeonato Paulista	3–1	Free kick	Mateus Alves
98	96	13 February 2011	Canindé, São Paulo	Portuguesa	2–3	São Paulo	Campeonato Paulista	0–2	Free kick	Weverton
99	97	23 March 2011	Jayme Cintra, Jundiai	Paulista	2–3	São Paulo	Campeonato Paulista	2–1	Penalty kick	Felipe Alves
100	98	27 March 2011	Arena Barueri, Barueri	São Paulo	2–1	Corinthians	Campeonato Paulista	2–0	Free kick	Júlio César
101	99	10 April 2011	Alfredo de Castilho, Bauru	Noroeste	1–4	São Paulo	Campeonato Paulista	0–1	Penalty kick	Yuri
102	100	4 August 2011	Morumbi, São Paulo	São Paulo	3–0	Bahia	Campeonato Brasileiro	1–0	Penalty kick	Marcelo Lomba
103	101	21 August 2011	Morumbi, São Paulo	São Paulo	1–2	Fluminense	Campeonato Brasileiro	1–2	Penalty kick	Diego Cavalieri
104	102	1 August 2012	Pituaçu, Salvador	Bahia	0–2	São Paulo	Copa Sudamericana	0–1	Free kick	Marcelo Lomba
105	103	18 August 2012	Morumbi, São Paulo	São Paulo	3–0	Ponte Preta	Campeonato Brasileiro	1–0	Penalty kick	Édson Bastos
106	104	11 November 2012	Olímpico, Porto Alegre	Grêmio	2–1	São Paulo	Campeonato Brasileiro	0–1	Penalty kick	Marcelo Grohe
107	105	18 November 2012	Morumbi, São Paulo	São Paulo	2–1	Náutico	Campeonato Brasileiro	2–1	Penalty kick	Felipe
108	106	23 January 2013	Morumbi, São Paulo	São Paulo	5–0	Bolívar	Copa Libertadores	5–0	Penalty kick	Marcos Argüello
109	107	9 February 2013	Brinco de Ouro, Campinas	Guarani	1–2	São Paulo	Campeonato Paulista	1–2	Free kick	Juliano
110	108	4 April 2013	Hernando Siles, La Paz	The Strongest	2–1	São Paulo	Copa Libertadores	1–1	Penalty kick	Daniel Vaca
111	109	17 April 2013	Morumbi, São Paulo	São Paulo	2–0	Atlético Mineiro	Copa Libertadores	1–0	Penalty kick	Victor
112	110	14 July 2013	Barradão, Salvador	Vitória	3–2	São Paulo	Campeonato Brasileiro	2–2	Free kick	Wilson
113	111	13 November 2013	Novelli Júnior, Itu	São Paulo	2–0	Flamengo	Campeonato Brasileiro	1–0	Penalty kick	Paulo Victor
114	112	9 February 2014	Moisés Lucarelli, Campinas	Ponte Preta	2–1	São Paulo	Campeonato Paulista	1–1	Penalty kick	Roberto
115	113	7 May 2014	Pacaembu, São Paulo	São Paulo	3–0	CRB	Copa do Brasil	3–0	Penalty kick	Johnnattan
116	114	21 May 2014	Maracanã, Rio de Janeiro	Fluminense	5–2	São Paulo	Campeonato Brasileiro	0–1	Penalty kick	Felipe
117	115	28 May 2014	Parque do Sabiá, Uberlândia	Atlético Paranaense	2–2	São Paulo	Campeonato Brasileiro	1–1	Penalty kick	Weverton
118	116	16 July 2014	Arena Fonte Nova, Salvador	Bahia	0–2	São Paulo	Campeonato Brasileiro	0–1	Penalty kick	Douglas Pires
119	117	31 August 2014	Orlando Scarpelli, Florianópolis	Figueirense	1–1	São Paulo	Campeonato Brasileiro	1–1	Penalty kick	Tiago Volpi
120	118	14 September 2014	Morumbi, São Paulo	São Paulo	2–0	Cruzeiro	Campeonato Brasileiro	1–0	Penalty kick	Fábio
121	119	24 September 2014	Morumbi, São Paulo	São Paulo	2–2	Flamengo	Campeonato Brasileiro	1–0	Penalty kick	Paulo Victor
122	120	4 October 2014	Arena do Grêmio, Porto Alegre	Grêmio	0–1	São Paulo	Campeonato Brasileiro	0–1	Penalty kick	Marcelo Grohe
123	121	18 October 2014	Morumbi, São Paulo	São Paulo	2–1	Bahia	Campeonato Brasileiro	1–0	Free kick	Marcelo Lomba
124	122	7 February 2015	Pacaembu, São Paulo	São Paulo	2–0	XV de Piracicaba	Campeonato Paulista	2–0	Penalty kick	Diogo Silva
125	123	12 March 2015	Morumbi, São Paulo	São Paulo	1–0	São Bento	Campeonato Paulista	1–0	Penalty kick	Henal
126	124	29 March 2015	Morumbi, São Paulo	São Paulo	3–0	Linense	Campeonato Paulista	1–0	Free kick	Anderson
127	125	11 April 2015	Morumbi, São Paulo	São Paulo	3–0	Red Bull Brasil	Campeonato Paulista	1–0	Free kick	Juninho
128	126	3 June 2015	Morumbi, São Paulo	São Paulo	3–2	Santos	Campeonato Brasileiro	3–2	Penalty kick	Vladimir
129	127	6 June 2015	Morumbi, São Paulo	São Paulo	2–0	Grêmio	Campeonato Brasileiro	2–0	Penalty kick	Tiago Machowski
130	128	12 August 2015	Orlando Scarpelli, Florianópolis	Figueirense	0–2	São Paulo	Campeonato Brasileiro	0–2	Penalty kick	Alex Muralha
131	129	26 August 2015	Castelão, Fortaleza	Ceará	0–3	São Paulo	Campeonato Brasileiro	0–1	Penalty kick	Luís Carlos

=== Farewell game ===
On 11 December 2015, a festive game was held between the world champion teams of São Paulo (1992–93, 2005) as a farewell to Rogério Ceni. He scored one of the goals, in addition to having played for about 20 minutes as a line-player.

11 December 2015

1992–93 São Paulo XI	3 – 5	2005 São Paulo XI
Cafu 18', 70'; Zetti 43' (pen.)	Report	Amoroso 1'; Aloísio 3'; Josué 32'; Thiago Ribeiro 40'; Rogério Ceni 72' (pen.)

Morumbi, São Paulo
Attendance: 60.000
Referee: Benito Archundia

== Overall ==
Following is the main statiscs about Rogério Ceni career.

=== Summary ===
Penalty kick goals
69
Free kick goals
61
Indirect free kick goals
1
Result in matches where Rogério's scored
92 Wins, 23 Draws, 9 Losses

=== Goals awarded by opponents ===
Club	FK	PK	GK	Total
(Minas Gerais) Cruzeiro	1	5	1	7
(São Paulo (state)) Palmeiras	2	5	0	7
(Santa Catarina (state)) Figueirense	2	4	0	6
(Rio Grande do Sul) Grêmio	1	5	0	6
(São Paulo (state)) Santos	3	2	0	5
(Rio de Janeiro (state)) Vasco da Gama	3	2	0	5
Bahia	2	2	0	4
(Rio de Janeiro (state)) Fluminense	2	2	0	4
(Paraná (state)) Paraná	3	1	0	4
(São Paulo (state)) Ponte Preta	1	3	0	4
(Minas Gerais) Atlético Mineiro	2	1	0	3
(São Paulo (state)) Corinthians	1	2	0	3
(Rio de Janeiro (state)) Flamengo	1	2	0	3
(São Paulo (state)) Guarani	3	0	0	3
(São Paulo (state)) Mogi Mirim	0	3	0	3
(São Paulo (state)) Portuguesa	2	1	0	3
(Pernambuco) Sport	3	0	0	3
(Paraná (state)) Athletico Paranaense	1	1	0	2
(Rio de Janeiro (state)) Botafogo	1	1	0	2
(Paraná (state)) Coritiba	1	1	0	2
(São Paulo (state)) Inter de Limeira	1	1	0	2
(Rio Grande do Sul) Internacional	1	1	0	2
(São Paulo (state)) Ituano	1	1	0	2
(São Paulo (state)) Linense	2	0	0	2
(Pernambuco) Náutico	0	2	0	2
(São Paulo (state)) Paulista de Jundiaí	0	2	0	2
(São Paulo (state)) Portuguesa Santista	2	0	0	2
(São Paulo (state)) Rio Branco	0	2	0	2
(Pernambuco) Santa Cruz	2	0	0	2
(Mexico) Tigres UANL	2	0	0	2
(Saudi Arabia) Al-Ittihad	0	1	0	1
(Peru) Alianza Lima	1	0	0	1
(Rio Grande do Norte) América de Natal	1	0	0	1
(São Paulo (state)) América de Rio Preto	1	0	0	1
(Goiás) Atlético Goianiense	0	1	0	1
(Bolivia) Bolívar	0	1	0	1
(Federal District (Brazil)) Brasiliense	1	0	0	1
(Venezuela) Caracas	0	1	0	1
Ceará	0	1	0	1
(Mexico) Chivas Guadalajara	0	1	0	1
(Alagoas) CRB	0	1	0	1
(Venezuela) Deportivo Táchira	1	0	0	1
Goiás	0	1	0	1
(São Paulo (state)) Juventus	0	1	0	1
(São Paulo (state)) Marília	1	0	0	1
(São Paulo (state)) Noroeste	0	1	0	1
(Colombia) Once Caldas	1	0	0	1
(Pará) Paysandu	1	0	0	1
(São Paulo (state)) Red Bull Brasil	1	0	0	1
(São Paulo (state)) Rio Claro	0	1	0	1
(Argentina) River Plate	0	1	0	1
(Argentina) San Lorenzo	1	0	0	1
(Brazil) Santos / Flamengo	1	0	0	1
(São Paulo (state)) Santo André	0	1	0	1
(São Paulo (state)) São Bento	0	1	0	1
(São Paulo (state)) São José	1	0	0	1
(Bolivia) The Strongest	0	1	0	1
(São Paulo (state)) União São João	1	0	0	1
Universidad de Chile	1	0	0	1
(Russia) Uralan Elista	1	0	0	1
(Bahia) Vitória	1	0	0	1
(São Paulo (state)) XV de Piracicaba	0	1	0	1

=== Goals by stadium ===
Stadium	FK	PK	GK	Total
Morumbi	37	36	0	73
Pacaembu	0	4	0	4
Brinco de Ouro	3	0	0	3
Mineirão	0	2	1	3
Orlando Scarpelli	0	3	0	3
Canindé	2	0	0	2
Major José Levy Sobrinho	1	1	0	2
Maracanã	1	1	0	2
Novelli Júnior	0	2	0	2
Olímpico	0	2	0	2
Parque do Sabiá	0	2	0	2
Vail Chaves	1	1	0	2
Alfredo de Castilho	0	1	0	1
Almeidão	1	0	0	1
Anacleto Campanella	0	1	0	1
Arena Barueri	1	0	0	1
Arena do Grêmio	0	1	0	1
Arena Fonte Nova	0	1	0	1
Arruda	1	0	0	1
Barradão	1	0	0	1
Castelão	0	1	0	1
Couto Pereira	0	1	0	1
Décio Vitta	0	1	0	1
Durival Britto	0	1	0	1
Hermínio Ometto	1	0	0	1
Hernando Siles	0	1	0	1
Ilha do Retiro	1	0	0	1
Jalisco	0	1	0	1
Jayme Cintra	0	1	0	1
Machadão	1	0	0	1
Mangueirão	1	0	0	1
Moisés Lucarelli	0	1	0	1
Nacional de Peru	1	0	0	1
National Stadium	0	1	0	1
Palogrande	1	0	0	1
Parque Antértica	0	1	0	1
Pituaçu	1	0	0	1
Serejão	1	0	0	1
Serra Dourada	0	1	0	1
Teixeirão	1	0	0	1
Ulrico Mursa	1	0	0	1
Vila Belmiro	0	1	0	1
Willie Davids	1	0	0	1

=== Goals by tournament ===
Competition	FK	PK	GK	Total
Campeonato Brasileiro	26	38	1	65
Campeonato Paulista	18	20	0	38
Copa Libertadores	6	8	0	14
Copa do Brasil	2	2	0	4
Torneio Rio – São Paulo	3	0	0	3
Copa Sudamericana	1	1	0	2
FIFA Club World Cup	0	1	0	1
Copa Mercosur	1	0	0	1
Copa dos Campeões	1	0	0	1
Torneio Constantino Cury	1	0	0	1
Friendly	1	0	0	1

=== Goals by year ===
Season	FK	PK	GK	Total
1997	3	0	0	3
1998	3	0	0	3
1999	3	2	0	5
2000	7	1	0	8
2001	2	0	0	2
2002	5	0	0	5
2003	2	0	0	2
2004	4	1	0	5
2005	11	10	0	21
2006	5	10	1	16
2007	2	8	0	10
2008	1	4	0	5
2009	2	0	0	2
2010	2	6	0	8
2011	3	5	0	8
2012	1	3	0	4
2013	2	4	0	6
2014	1	9	0	10
2015	2	6	0	8

== See also ==
- List of goalscoring goalkeepers
