= Estádio Hermínio Ometto =

Soccer stadium in Araras, Brazil

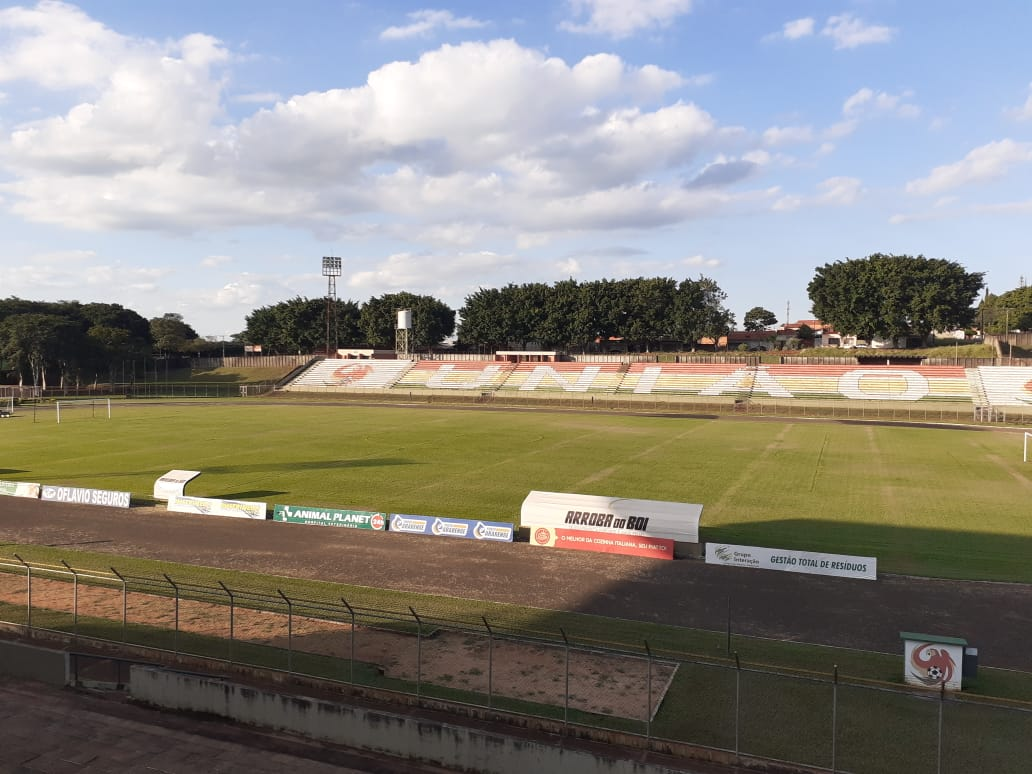
- Sisbrace
- Interactive map of Estádio Hermínio Ometto
- Full name: Estádio Doutor Hermínio Ometto
- Location: Araras, São Paulo state, Brazil
- Coordinates: 22°21′33.31″S 47°20′26.05″W
- Owner: União São João
- Capacity: 16.000
- Surface: Natural grass
- Field size: 105 by 68 metres (114.8 yd × 74.4 yd)

Construction
- Opened: May 18, 1988

Tenant
- União São João

Estádio Doutor Hermínio Ometto, usually simply Estádio Hermínio Ometto, is an association football stadium in Araras, on the countryside of São Paulo, Brazil. The stadium holds 21.000 people. It was inaugurated in 1988. The stadium is owned by the União São João.

The person who names the Araras stadium was influential in the city. Born in Piracicaba, in 1914, he moved due to the purchase of Fazenda São João by his father José, in 1935. Sugar mill Usina São João was created there, which Hermínio took over after José's death. In 1946, he was elected councilor and six years later became mayor. In 1953, he founded the team at S.E.R. Usina São João, the team became professional in the following decade and competed in FPF tournaments between 1961 and 1964. The team was bankrupt in 1981. Five years later, however, the patron Hermínio Ometto ends up dying before the successor, União São João, obtains great conquests.

== Rogério Ceni first goal ==
It was also at Herminio Ometto that Rogério Ceni went down in history scoring his first free-kick goal of his career, on February 15, 1997, in the 1997 Campeonato Paulista, against goalkeeper Adinam.

== See also ==
- List of goals scored by Rogério Ceni
