= Paulo Sérgio (footballer, born 1974) =

Brazilian footballer

Personal information
- Full name: Paulo Sérgio de Rezende
- Date of birth: 21 June 1974 (age 52)
- Place of birth: Goiânia, Brazil
- Position: Goalkeeper

Senior career*
Years	Team	Apps	(Gls)
1993	Ituano		
1994–2000	São Paulo		
2001	Sport Recife		
2002–2003	Vila Nova		
2003	Anápolis		
2004	União Rondonópolis		
2005	Paranavaí		
2005–2006	Galo Maringá		
2006	Taubaté		
2007	Oeste		
2008	Morrinhos		
2008	Santa Helena		
- * Club domestic league appearances and goals

Paulo Sérgio de Rezende (born 21 June 1974), better known as Paulo Sérgio, is a Brazilian former professional footballer who played as a goalkeeper.

== Football career ==
Paulo Sérgio was a reserve at São Paulo FC for most of the 90s, playing in a few matches mainly during the period in which Roger had relationship problems with coach Paulo César Carpegiani. Played for several other clubs in Brazil, but without managing to establish himself.

== Political career ==
Paulo Sérgio was mayor of the city Hidrolândia, Goiás, from 2013 to 2020.

== Honours ==
São Paulo

- Copa CONMEBOL: 1994
- Campeonato Paulista: 1998, 2000

Santa Helena

- Campeonato Goiano Second Division: 2008
