= Roger (footballer, born 1972) =

Brazilian footballer

Personal information
- Full name: Roger José de Noronha Silva
- Date of birth: July 23, 1972 (age 54)
- Place of birth: Cantagalo, Rio de Janeiro, Brazil
- Height: 1.87 m (6 ft 2 in)
- Position: Goalkeeper

Youth career
- Flamengo

Senior career*
Years	Team	Apps	(Gls)
1991–1996	Flamengo	82	(0)
1994	→ Vitória (loan)		
1997–2005	São Paulo	54	(0)
1999	→ Vitória (loan)		
2000	→ Portuguesa (loan)		
2006–2007	Santos		
2007–2008	Botafogo		
- * Club domestic league appearances and goals

Roger José de Noronha Silva, or simply Roger is a Brazilian football goalkeeper.

== Career ==
Roger began his career at Flamengo in 1991 when he was a reserve for Gilmar.

Was loaned to Victoria in 1994 but then returned to the Gavia later that year to become the Flamengo goalkeeper.

In 1997, Roger left Flamengo and went to São Paulo, however, failed to win a starting place, left by Zetti.

Followed loaned to Victoria again, and then to Portugal, before returning to the Morumbi in 2001.

It was followed four years in the reserve Rogerio Ceni, until being traded to the Saints in late 2005. However, despite the exchange club, continued to be reserves, this time by Fábio Costa .

Then near the end of 2007, Roger saw his last chance to hold back when the interest arose from Botafogo. Unfortunately, a shoulder injury eventually disrupting their plans, so he decided to retire in mid-2008.

== Honours ==
Flamengo

- Taça Rio: 1991, 1996
- Campeonato Carioca: 1991, 1996
- Copa Rio: 1991
- Campeonato Brasileiro: 1992
- Taça Guanabara: 1995, 1996
- Copa de Oro 1996

São Paulo

- Campeonato Paulista: 1998, 2005
- Torneio Rio-São Paulo: 2001
- Supercampeonato Paulista: 2002
- Copa Libertadores: 2005

Vitória

- Campeonato Baiano: 1999
- Copa do Nordeste: 1999

Santos

- Campeonato Paulista: 2006, 2007

Botafogo

- Taça Rio: 2008
