= Adinam (footballer) =

Brazilian footballer (born 1975)

Personal information
- Full name: Adinam Cardozo
- Date of birth: 3 May 1975 (age 51)
- Place of birth: Campinas, Brazil
- Height: 1.90 m (6 ft 3 in)
- Position: Goalkeeper

Senior career*
Years	Team	Apps	(Gls)
1994–1998	União São João		
1998	Coritiba		
1999	Goiás		
1999	Portuguesa		
2000	Paysandu		
2001–2002	Sport Recife		
2002	Guarani		
2003	América-SP		
2004–2006	Avaí		
2007	Caldense		
2007	Noroeste		
2007–2008	Paulista		
2009	Linense		
2009	Marília		
2009	Uberlândia		
2010	São Bento		
2011	Pelotas		
2011	Palmeirinha		
2012	Itapirense		
2012	Primavera		
2013	Batatais		
2013	Primavera		
2014	Itapirense		
2014	Atlético Sorocaba		
2014	Primavera		
2015	Atlético Sorocaba		
2016	Primavera		
- * Club domestic league appearances and goals as of 27 November 2023

Adinam Cardozo (born 3 May 1975) is a former Brazilian professional footballer who played as a goalkeeper. Two Brazilian football icons achieved important career feats against him in 1997: Rogério Ceni's first of 131 recorded goals during a Campeonato Paulista match on 15 February and the only double hat-trick in Brasileirão Série A history, scored by Edmundo, on 11 September.

== Honours ==
União São João

- Campeonato Brasileiro Série B: 1996

Goiás

- Campeonato Goiano: 1999

Paysandu

- Campeonato Paraense: 2000
