= 1999 Campeonato Paulista =

Campeonato Paulista - Série A1
- Season: 1999
- Champions: Corinthians (23rd title)
- Relegated: Ituano; São José
- Matches played: 162
- Goals scored: 555 (3.43 per match)
- Top goalscorer: Alex (Mogi Mirim) - 12 goals
- Biggest home win: Rio Branco 7-1 Mogi Mirim (March 24, 1999)
- Biggest away win: Portuguesa Santista 0-5 Guarani (February 3, 1999); Portuguesa Santista 1-6 Santos (May 5, 1999)
- Highest scoring: Matonense 5-4 União São João (February 21, 1999)

The 1999 Campeonato Paulista de Futebol Profissional da Primeira Divisão - Série A1 was the 98th season of São Paulo's top professional football league. Corinthians won the championship for the 23rd time. Ituano and São José were relegated.

== Championship ==
=== First phase ===
The first phase was disputed by all the teams of the championship, save for Corinthians, Palmeiras, Santos and São Paulo, which would dispute the Rio-São Paulo tournament at the time and would only enter in the second phase. The teams would be divided in two groups of six teams, and the four best teams in each group would qualify for the second phase, with the others going to the relegation group.

==== Group 1 ====
Pos	Team	Pld	W	D	L	GF	GA	GD	Pts	Qualification or relegation
1	Portuguesa (A)	10	7	1	2	20	10	+10	22	Qualified to Second phase
2	União Barbarense (A)	10	6	2	2	20	10	+10	20	Qualified to Second phase
3	Rio Branco (A)	10	5	1	4	19	13	+6	16	Qualified to Second phase
4	Inter de Limeira (A)	10	3	2	5	10	17	−7	11	Qualified to Second phase
5	São José (Q)	10	2	5	3	7	13	−6	11	Relegation Playoffs
6	Ituano (Q)	10	1	2	7	8	21	−13	5	Relegation Playoffs

Updated to match(es) played on 20 June 1999. Source: RSSSF.com
Rules for classification: 1) points; 2) goal difference; 3) number of goals scored.
(A) Advance to a further round; (Q) Qualified for the phase indicated

==== Group 2 ====
Pos	Team	Pld	W	D	L	GF	GA	GD	Pts	Qualification or relegation
1	Mogi Mirim (A)	10	5	3	2	20	14	+6	18	Qualified to Second phase
2	Matonense (A)	10	5	1	4	21	23	−2	16	Qualified to Second phase
3	Guarani (A)	10	4	4	2	19	12	+7	16	Qualified to Second phase
4	Portuguesa Santista (A)	10	4	1	5	16	19	−3	13	Qualified to Second phase
5	Araçatuba (Q)	10	3	3	4	18	19	−1	12	Relegation Playoffs
6	União São João (Q)	10	2	2	6	17	24	−7	8	Relegation Playoffs

Updated to match(es) played on 20 June 1999. Source: RSSSF.com
Rules for classification: 1) points; 2) goal difference; 3) number of goals scored.
(A) Advance to a further round; (Q) Qualified for the phase indicated

=== Relegation playoffs ===
Pos	Team	Pld	W	D	L	GF	GA	GD	Pts	Qualification or relegation
1	União São João	6	4	0	2	12	8	+4	12	
2	Araçatuba	6	4	0	2	9	6	+3	12	
3	Ituano (R)	6	3	1	2	9	6	+3	10	Relegated
4	São José (R)	6	0	1	5	4	15	−11	1	Relegated

Updated to match(es) played on 20 June 1999. Source: RSSSF.com
Rules for classification: 1) points; 2) goal difference; 3) number of goals scored.
(R) Relegated

=== Second phase ===
In the second phase, the 8 qualified teams were joined by the four participants of the Rio-São Paulo tournament. The 12 teams were divided in two groups of six teams, with each team playing twice against the teams of its own group, and once against the teams of the other group, with the two best teams in each group qualifying to the Semifinals.

==== Group 3 ====
Pos	Team	Pld	W	D	L	GF	GA	GD	Pts
1	São Paulo	16	12	3	1	46	18	+28	39
2	Palmeiras	16	9	5	2	32	22	+10	32
3	Portuguesa	16	9	3	4	29	25	+4	30
4	Rio Branco	16	6	1	9	36	31	+5	19
5	Inter de Limeira	16	5	4	7	27	36	-9	19
6	Matonense	16	5	2	9	25	32	-7	17

==== Group 4 ====
Pos	Team	Pld	W	D	L	GF	GA	GD	Pts
1	Santos	16	9	4	3	37	22	+15	31
2	Corinthians	16	8	2	6	31	27	+4	26
3	União Barbarense	16	6	3	7	29	26	+3	21
4	Mogi Mirim	16	4	5	7	18	32	-14	17
5	Guarani	16	3	3	10	21	32	-11	12
6	Portuguesa Santista	16	1	3	12	11	39	-28	6

=== Semifinals ===
Team 1	Agg.	Team 2	1st leg	2nd leg
Palmeiras	3–3	Santos	2-1	1–2
Corinthians	5–1	São Paulo	4-0	1-1

=== Finals ===
Team 1	Agg.	Team 2	1st leg	2nd leg
Corinthians	5–2	Palmeiras	3-0	2–2
