= Torneio Constantino Cury =

2000 Torneio Constantino Cury
Tournament details
- Country: São Paulo, Brazil
- Dates: 15–18 January 2000
- Teams: 4

Final positions
- Champions: (Brazil) São Paulo
- Runners-up: (Russia) Uralan Elista

Tournament statistics
- Matches played: 4
- Goals scored: 20 (5 per match)
- Top goal scorer(s): Vidas Dančenka (Uralan Elista); Marquinhos (Avaí); Raí (São Paulo); 2 goals each

The Torneio Constantino Cury (English: Constantino Cury Tournament), was a friendly tournament in 2000 organized by São Paulo FC in honor of centenary of Club Athletico Paulistano, the team whose football department originally founded São Paulo FC. The name of the competition was a posthumous tribute to Constantino Cury, one of the club's advisers.

== Participants ==
- (Brazil) São Paulo FC
- (Brazil) Avaí FC
- (Russia) Uralan Elista
- Haiti

== Matches ==
Following are the four matches that were played in Torneio Constantino Cury.

=== Semifinals ===
15 January

Uralan Elista (Russia)	3–1	Haiti
Brener 14'; Dančenka 50', 89'		Goal

Estádio do Morumbi, São Paulo
15 January

São Paulo (Brazil)	3–2	(Brazil) Avaí
Marcelinho 17'; Raí 38'; Wilson 73'		Marquinhos 58', 61'

Estádio do Morumbi, São Paulo
Referee: Olten Ayres de Abreu and Romildo Corrêa

Note: São Paulo FC played the first half of this match wearing the CA Paulistano uniforms.

=== Third place match ===
18 January

Avaí (Brazil)	3–2	Haiti
Missinho 14'; Renatinho 83'; Dão 90'		Menelas 6'; Bruny 58'

Estádio do Morumbi, São Paulo

=== Final ===
18 January
20:30 (UTC−3)

São Paulo (Brazil)	5–1	(Russia) Uralan Elista
Edmílson 29'; França 36'; Raí 56'; Rogério Ceni 83'; Souza 90'		Semochko 47'

Estádio do Morumbi, São Paulo
Referee: Alfredo Loebeling

== Champion ==
Torneio Constantino Cury
(Brazil)
São Paulo
1st title
