= Marcelo Bonan =

Brazilian footballer

Personal information
- Date of birth: 27 May 1981 (age 45)
- Place of birth: Planalto, Paraná, Brazil
- Height: 1.88 m (6 ft 2 in)
- Position: Goalkeeper

Senior career*
Years	Team	Apps	(Gls)
- ?
2005	Democrata de Sete Lagoas		
2005	União de Araxá		
2005	Nacional (AM)	7+	(0)
2006	Rio Branco (SP)		
2006	Santo André	31	(0)
2007	Coritiba	0	(0)
2007	América (RN)	0	(0)
2008	Rio Preto		
2008–2009	Ceará	14	(0)
2010	São Bernardo FC		
2011	Ituano		
2011	Fortaleza	0	(0)
2011	Atlético Sorocaba		
2012	Santo André		
2013	São Bernardo FC		
2014–2016	Independente Limeira		
2016	Joseense		
2016	São José		
2017	Velo Clube		
2017	Central		
2018	Mogi Mirim		
- * Club domestic league appearances and goals

Marcelo Bonan (born 27 May 1981) is a Brazilian footballer.

== Biography ==
Bonan left for Campeonato Brasileiro Série C side Nacional (AM) in July 2005. He was the first choice keeper ahead Ângelo. However, he was on the bench in the quarter-finals matches.

In 2006 season, he left for Rio Branco (SP), then for Santo André at Campeonato Brasileiro Série B. He was the first choice goalkeeper ahead Júnior Costa.

Bonan played the first match of Coritiba at 2007 Copa do Brasil. He then lost his starting place to Café. On the same day that Artur re-signed with Coritiba, he left for América (RN). He was the backup keeper behind Renê, Sérvulo and Gléguer Zorzin at 2007 Campeonato Brasileiro Série A.

In 2008, he left for Rio Preto to play at 2008 Campeonato Paulista. He was the backup keeper of Adriano Pitarelli until round 7.

In May he left for Campeonato Brasileiro Série B side Ceará. He was the backup keeper for Adilson and won the opening season of 2009 Campeonato Cearense with team. In 2009 Campeonato Brasileiro Série B he won promotion to Série A with club.

In 2010, he left for Campeonato Paulista Série A2 side São Bernardo FC. He was the first choice keeper ahead Anderson. He played 18 out of 19 group stage matches, but lost the starting place to Anderson in playoffs, only played the first 2 matches out of 6 matches.

After without a club for a few months, he was signed by Ituano in November 2010. In April 2011 he was signed by Fortaleza, city rival of Ceará.

== Honours ==
Runner-up

- Campeonato Potiguar: 2007
- Campeonato Cearense: 2009
  - Winner of Taça Estado do Ceará: 2009

== Career statistics ==
Club performance			League		Cup		League Cup		Total	
Season	Club	League	Apps	Goals	Apps	Goals	Apps	Goals	Apps	Goals
Brazil			League		Copa do Brasil		League Cup		Total	
2005	Democrata (SL)	Mineiro					?	?	?	?
2005	União de Araxá	Mineiro Módulo II					?	?	?	?
2005	Nacional (AM)	Brasileiro Série C	7+	0					7+	0
2006	Rio Branco (SP)	Paulista Série A1					?	?	?	?
2006	Santo André	Brasileiro Série B	31	0					31	0
2007	Coritiba	Paranaense 1ª Divisão			1	0	0	0	1	0
2007	América (RN)	Brasileiro Série A	0	0	0	0	?	?	0	0
2008	Rio Preto	Paulista Série A1					13	0	13	0
2008	Ceará	Brasileiro Série B	9	0					9	0
2009	Ceará	Brasileiro Série B	5	0			0	0	5	0
2010	São Bernardo FC	Paulista Série A2					20	0	20	0
2011	Ituano	Paulista Série A1					10	0	10	0
2011	Fortaleza	Brasileiro Série C	0	0					0	0
Career total			52+	0	1	0				
