= Favaro =

Favaro or Favarò is an Italian surname, popular in the region of Veneto that may refer to:

== Favaro ==
- Alexandre Fávaro (born 1977), Brazilian football player
- Davide Favaro (born 1984), Italian football player
- Roberto Favaro (born 1965), Italian rugby union player and coach
- Simone Favaro (born 1988), Italian rugby union player, son of Roberto

== Favarò ==
This variant of the Favaro surname can be found in Sicily. It first appeared on a document in 1825. Roughly 34 people have this surname, of which 33 live in Italy, and 1 in the United Arab Emirates. This variant is also the 3,373,373rd most common surname in the World.

- Biagio Favarò (1941-2022), mayor of Lercara Friddi

== See also ==
- Favaro Veneto, an urban part in northern Italy
