= Edervan =

Brazilian footballer

Personal information
- Full name: Edervan Boiam
- Date of birth: 22 February 1975 (age 51)
- Place of birth: Urânia, Brazil
- Position: Goalkeeper

Youth career
- 1994–1996: Guarani

Senior career*
Years	Team	Apps	(Gls)
1996–2003	Guarani		
1997	→ Juventus-SP (loan)		
1997	→ Atlético Goianiense (loan)		
2001	→ Inter de Limeira (loan)		
2003	Náutico		
2004	Mogi Mirim		
2005	Caxias		
2006	Mogi Mirim		
2007–2008	Ulbra-RS		
- * Club domestic league appearances and goals as of 1 December 2023

Edervan Boiam (born 22 February 1975), simply known as Edervan, is a Brazilian former professional footballer who played as a goalkeeper.

== Career ==
Guarani's goalkeeper from 1996 to 2003, Edervan competed for the starting position with names like Pitarelli and Gléguer over the years. He was hired by Náutico in 2003, and also played for Mogi Mirim, Caxias and Ulbra-RS. He is currently goalkeeping coach at Guarani.

== Honours ==
Guarani

- Copa São Paulo de Futebol Jr.: 1994
