= Angelo da Costa =

Brazilian footballer (born 1983)

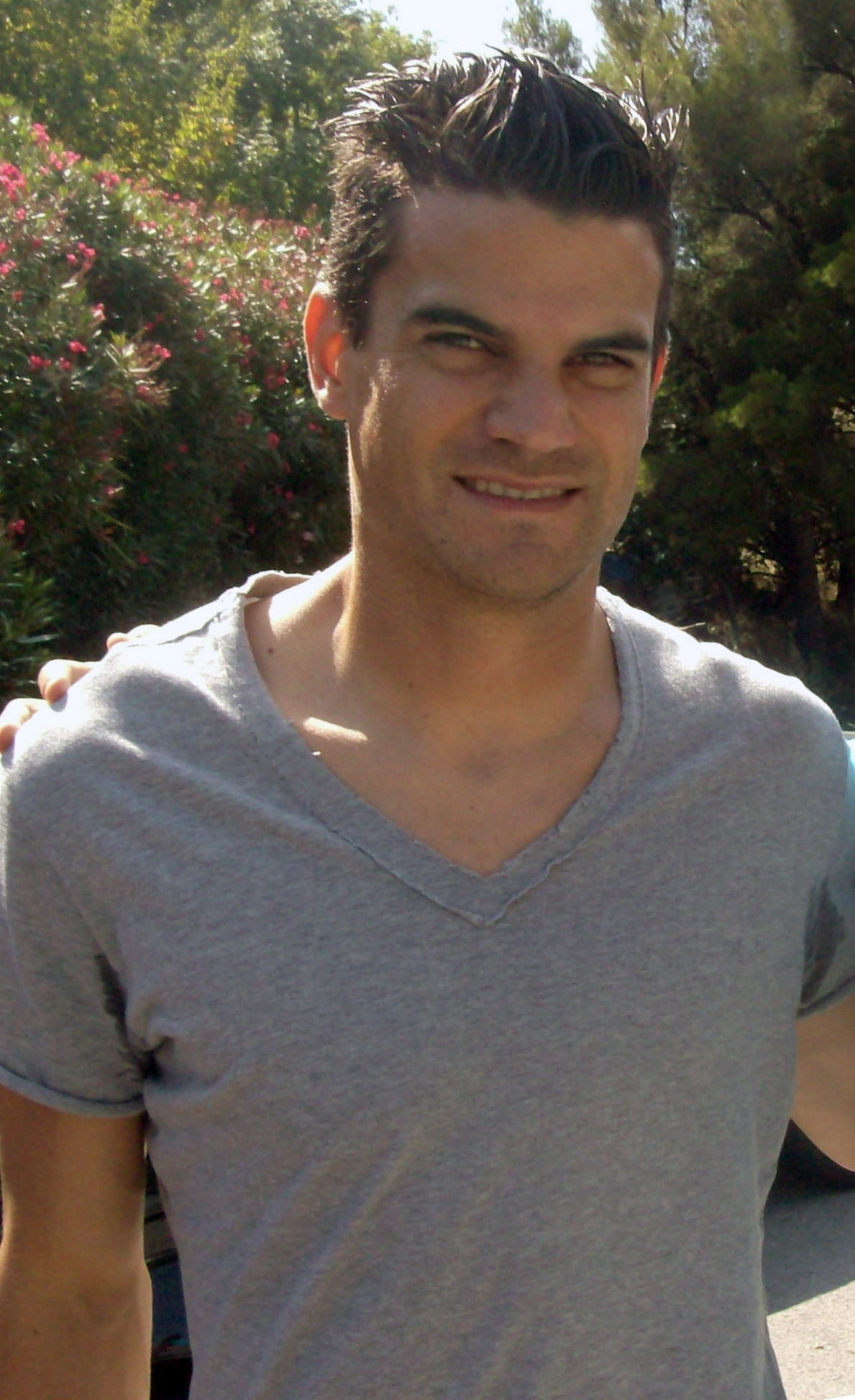

Personal information
- Full name: Angelo Esmael da Costa Júnior
- Date of birth: 12 November 1983 (age 42)
- Place of birth: São Bernardo do Campo, Brazil
- Height: 1.87 m (6 ft 2 in)
- Position: Goalkeeper

Senior career*
Years	Team	Apps	(Gls)
2000–2007	Santo André	27	(0)
2007–2008	Varese	0	(0)
2008–2010	Ancona	69	(0)
2010–2015	Sampdoria	56	(0)
2015–2021	Bologna	47	(0)
Total		199	(0)
- * Club domestic league appearances and goals

Angelo Esmael da Costa Júnior (born 12 November 1983) is a Brazilian former professional footballer who played as a goalkeeper. He was known as Júnior Costa in Brazil, and as Angelo Da Costa (or simply Da Costa) in Italy and the UEFA Champions League.

== Career ==
=== Santo André ===
Da Costa played 8 out of 11 2004 Copa do Brasil matches, ahead Júlio César Martins.

He signed an improved contract with Santo André of Brasileiro Série B in April 2005, which run until December 2008. At the 2005 Copa Libertadores he was Júlio César Martins' backup, except in one game against Cerro Porteño.

He was the backup keeper for Marcelo Bonan at 2006 Campeonato Brasileiro Série B. He made his league debut on 25 August 2006, replacing Bonan in the 23rd minute.

=== Varese & Ancona ===
In January 2008 da Costa left for Italian Serie C2 side Varese.

During the summer of 2008, he signed for Ancona for an undisclosed fee.

=== Sampdoria ===
Da Costa was given permission to negotiate with Sampdoria in July, days before the expel of Ancona from professional league due to financial regulation. He became the second keeper of the team, behind another new signing, Gianluca Curci, as the team released Luca Castellazzi, Matteo Guardalben, sold Antonio Mirante, did not buy Mario Cassano and failed to buy Marco Storari. He was assigned shirt number 1 previously owned by Castellazzi and made his first start in Serie A on 8 May 2011, the Derby della Lanterna. That match was the second last match of round 36 (and was the third last round); Lecce had already secured three points before the kick off of the derby and eventually Samp lost 1–2 through a late goal by Mauro Boselli. Sampdoria dropped into the relegation zone by two points short with Lecce. In the next round he remained as starting keeper, as Curci remained unfit, He conceded two goals, the first by Lecce native Fabrizio Miccoli as Samp lost to Palermo 1–2 and were relegated, while Lecce won the local derby against Bari.

Da Costa played 15 games in 2011–12 Serie B. Initially the backup of Sergio Romero, he was made first-choice goalkeeper after Romero's injury. In the promotion playoffs, Romero was on international duty and missed the first rounds, and da Costa played the matches contributing to a win against Sassuolo. Romero temporarily returned to Samp for the first leg of the finals on 6 June, however Romero left again for the return leg. Da Costa once again became first-choice goalkeeper for the return leg in Varese's Stadio Franco Ossola.

=== Bologna ===
On 20 January 2015, da Costa signed with Bologna F.C. 1909. On 8 July 2015, he signed a new three-year contract.

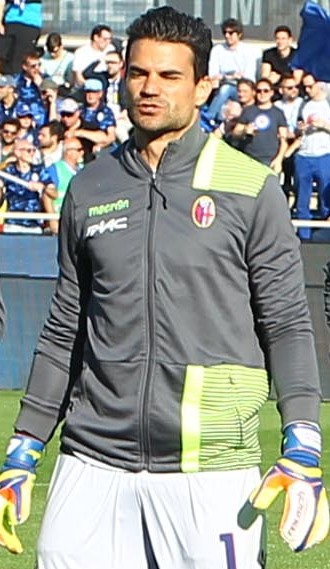
Da Costa in 2017.

== Career statistics ==
Appearances and goals by club, season and competition
Club	Season	League			Cup		Continental		Other		Total	
Club	Season	Division	Apps	Goals	Apps	Goals	Apps	Goals	Apps	Goals	Apps	Goals
Santo André	2004	Série B			8	0	—		—			
Santo André	2005	Série B			—		1	0	—			
Santo André	2006	Série B	7	0	0	0	—		—		7	0
Santo André	2007	Série B	16	0	—		—		—			
Santo André	Total		23	0	8	0	1	0	0	0	32	0
Varese	2007–08	Serie C2	0	0	0	0	—		—		0	0
Ancona	2008–09	Serie B	27	0	1	0	—		2	0	30	0
Ancona	2009–10	Serie B	42	0	0	0	—		—		42	0
Ancona	Total		69	0	1	0	—		2	0	72	0
Sampdoria	2010–11	Serie A	4	0	2	0	2	0	—		8	0
Sampdoria	2011–12	Serie B	15	0	2	0	—		3^{1}	0	20	0
Sampdoria	2012–13	Serie A	4	0	0	0	—		—		4	0
Sampdoria	2013–14	Serie A	33	0	1	0	—		—		34	0
Sampdoria	2014–15	Serie A	0	0	1	0	—		—		1	0
Sampdoria	Total		56	0	6	0	2	0	3	0	67	0
Bologna	2014–15	Serie B	13	0	0	0	—		—		13	0
Bologna	2015–16	Serie A	5	0	0	0	—		—		5	0
Bologna	2016–17	Serie A	18	0	1	0	—		—		19	0
Bologna	2017–18	Serie A	4	0	0	0	—		—		4	0
Bologna	2018–19	Serie A	0	0	2	0	—		—		2	0
Bologna	2019–20	Serie A	1	0	1	0	—		—		2	0
Bologna	2020–21	Serie A	6	0	2	0	—		—		8	0
Bologna	Total		47	0	6	0	—		—		53	0
Career total			195	0	21	0	3	0	5	0	224	0

Note

^{1} Three matches in the promotion playoffs

== Honours ==
- Copa do Brasil: 2004

State

- Copa Estado de São Paulo: 2003

Youth

- Taça São Paulo de Juniores: 2003
