= Gustavo Nascimento =

Brazilian footballer (born 1977)

Personal information
- Full name: Gustavo Ramon do Nascimento
- Date of birth: July 8, 1977 (age 49)
- Place of birth: Uberlândia, Brazil
- Height: 1.91 m (6 ft 3 in)
- Position: Goalkeeper

Youth career
- 1996–1997: União São João

Senior career*
Years	Team	Apps	(Gls)
1997	Novorizontino		
1998	→ Americano (Loan)		
1999	→ Nacional-SP (Loan)		
1999	União São João		
2000	Nacional-SP		
2000–2001	Guaratinguetá-SP		
2002–2006	Figueirense	21	(0)
2007	Sport	?	(?)
2008	Figueirense	1	(0)
2009	Santa Cruz		
2010	Náutico		
2010–2011	Sport Recife		
- * Club domestic league appearances and goals

Gustavo Ramon do Nascimento or simply Gustavo (born July 8, 1977) is a Brazilian former footballer who played as a goalkeeper.

== Honours ==
- Santa Catarina State League: 2002, 2003, 2004, 2008
- Campeonato Pernambucano in 2006 with Sport Recife
