= 1997 Campeonato Paulista =

Campeonato Paulista - Série A1
- Season: 1997
- Champions: Corinthians
- Relegated: América; Botafogo
- Matches played: 190
- Goals scored: 611 (3.22 per match)
- Top goalscorer: Dodô (São Paulo) - 19 goals
- Biggest home win: São Paulo 8-1 Juventus (April 26, 1997)
- Biggest away win: América 0-6 Palmeiras (February 19, 1997)
- Highest scoring: Corinthians 8-2 Guarani (March 22, 1997)

The 1997 Campeonato Paulista de Futebol Profissional da Primeira Divisão - Série A1 was the 96th season of São Paulo's top professional football league. Corinthians won the championship for the 22nd time. América and Botafogo were relegated.

== Championship ==
=== First phase ===
In the first phase, the sixteen teams of the championship were divided into two groups of eight, with each team playing once against the teams of its own group and twice against the other group's teams. The two best teams of each group qualified into the Final Group and the two teams with the fewest points out of the sixteen were relegated.

==== Group 1 ====
Pos	Team	Pld	W	D	L	GF	GA	GD	Pts	Qualification or relegation
1	Palmeiras	23	14	6	3	58	27	+31	48	Qualified to Final group
2	Santos	23	13	7	3	45	23	+22	46	Qualified to Final group
3	Portuguesa	23	12	7	4	46	33	+13	43	
4	Guarani	23	7	8	8	37	45	−8	29	
5	Juventus	23	5	6	12	38	53	−15	21	
6	São José	23	4	9	10	29	40	−11	21	
7	Botafogo	23	4	8	11	22	33	−11	20	Relegated
8	América	23	4	5	14	28	62	−34	17	Relegated

Updated to match(es) played on 18 May 1997. Source: RSSSF.com
Rules for classification: 1) points; 2) wins; 3) goal difference; 4) number of goals scored.

==== Group 2 ====
Pos	Team	Pld	W	D	L	GF	GA	GD	Pts	Qualification or relegation
1	Corinthians	23	13	6	4	51	28	+23	45	Qualified to Final group
2	São Paulo	23	10	10	3	50	26	+24	40	Qualified to Final group
3	União São João	23	9	6	8	35	32	+3	33	
4	Inter de Limeira	23	7	8	8	35	37	−2	29	
5	Rio Branco	23	7	7	9	30	33	−3	28	
6	Araçatuba	23	7	5	11	28	33	−5	26	
7	Portuguesa Santista	23	7	5	11	30	45	−15	26	
8	Mogi Mirim	23	6	7	10	28	41	−13	25	

Updated to match(es) played on 18 May 1997. Source: RSSSF.com
Rules for classification: 1) points; 2) wins; 3) goal difference; 4) number of goals scored.

=== Final Playoffs ===
Pos	Team	Pld	W	D	L	GF	GA	GD	Pts	Qualification or relegation
1	Corinthians	3	2	1	0	7	4	+3	7	Champions
2	São Paulo	3	2	1	0	6	2	+4	7	
3	Santos	3	1	0	2	7	5	+2	3	
4	Palmeiras	3	0	0	3	1	10	−9	0	

Updated to match(es) played on 5 June 1997. Source: RSSSF.com
Rules for classification: 1) points; 2) Best season record
