= João Paulo (footballer, born February 1981) =

Brazilian footballer

Personal information
- Full name: João Paulo Azevedo Barbosa
- Date of birth: 12 February 1981 (age 45)
- Place of birth: Limeira, Brazil
- Height: 1.85 m (6 ft 1 in)
- Position: Goalkeeper

Team information
- Current team: Nacional-AM

Youth career
- 1998–2000: União São João

Senior career*
Years	Team	Apps	(Gls)
2000–2003	União São João		
2004	Ituano		
2005	Inter de Limeira		
2006	Oeste		
2007	América-RN		
2007–2008	Rio Branco-ES		
2008	Metropolitano		
2009	Brasil de Pelotas	9	(0)
2010	Metropolitano	8	(0)
2011	Mogi Mirim	0	(0)
2011	Grêmio Barueri	2	(0)
2012	Catanduvense	0	(0)
2012	Bragantino	0	(0)
2012	Icasa	14	(0)
2013	Joinville	0	(0)
2013	Cuiabá	13	(0)
2014	Metropolitano	0	(0)
2014	Atlético Sorocaba	0	(0)
2015	CSA	0	(0)
2015	Chapecoense	0	(0)
2016	Brusque	12	(0)
2016–	Nacional-AM	0	(0)
- * Club domestic league appearances and goals as of 17 April 2016

João Paulo Azevedo Barbosa (born 12 February 1981), simply known as João Paulo, is a Brazilian footballer who plays for Nacional-AM as a goalkeeper.

== Club career ==
Born in Limeira, São Paulo, João Paulo made his senior debuts with União São João in 2000. After subsequently playing for lower teams in the same state, he joined América-RN in 2007.

On 12 February 2008, after appearing with Rio Branco-ES, João Paulo signed for Metropolitano. He left the club in the following year, but after playing for Brasil de Pelotas, returned to Metrô in 2010.

João Paulo moved back to his native state on 2 October 2010, after agreeing to a deal with Mogi Mirim. On 15 April of the following year he joined Grêmio Barueri in Série B, making his debut in the category on 20 May 2011, starting in a 0–1 away loss against Goiás.

On 16 May 2012, after impressing with Grêmio Catanduvense in Campeonato Paulista (despite appearing in only three matches), João Paulo signed for Bragantino. After making no appearances for Braga, he moved to Icasa shortly after.

On 2 January 2013 João Paulo was announced at Joinville. On 13 May he joined Cuiabá, but returned to Metropolitano on 12 November.

On 27 June 2014, João Paulo agreed a contract with Blumenau, but on 2 July joined Atlético Sorocaba. On 3 November he moved to CSA, but rescinded his link on 19 February 2015.

Hours after rescinding with CSA, João Paulo signed a three-month deal with Série A club Chapecoense.
