= Henal =

Brazilian footballer (born 1984)

Personal information
- Full name: Anderson Silva Santana
- Date of birth: 7 December 1984 (age 41)
- Place of birth: São Paulo, Brazil
- Height: 1.85 m (6 ft 1 in)
- Position: Goalkeeper

Senior career*
Years	Team	Apps	(Gls)
2001–2004	Força		
2005–2006	Osvaldo Cruz		
2007	Olímpia		
2007	Desportiva		
2007	Osvaldo Cruz		
2007	Tupã		
2008	Guaçuano		
2008	Penapolense		
2008	Osvaldo Cruz		
2009	Juventus-SC		
2009	Anapolina		
2009	Inter de Limeira		
2010	Rio Branco-SP		
2010	Juventus-SC		
2010	Batatais		
2011	São Bento		
2011	Juventus-SC		
2012–2016	São Bento		
2015	→ Guarani (loan)		
2016–2017	Cuiabá	47	(1)
2018–2019	São Bento		
2020	Santo André		
2020	Imperatriz		
2021	Bandeirante		
2022	São José-SP		
2023	Sertãozinho	1	(0)
- * Club domestic league appearances and goals as of 30 October 2023

Anderson Silva Santana (born 7 December 1984), better known as Henal, is a Brazilian professional footballer who plays as a goalkeeper.

== Career ==
Henal played for several clubs, with emphasis on EC São Bento and Cuiabá EC, teams where he became champion. In 2016 Campeonato Brasileiro Série C scored a goal in the match Cuiabá vs. América de Natal. Henal played 47 times for the club.

His last club was Sertãozinho FC in 2023, where he played just one match and was resigned after attacking the player Gabriel Mendes from União Suzano.

== Honours ==
Desportiva

- Campeonato Capixaba Série B: 2007

São Bento

- Campeonato Paulista Série A3: 2013

Cuiabá

- Copa FMF: 2016

== See also ==
- List of goalscoring goalkeepers
