= 2000 Campeonato Paulista =

Campeonato Paulista - Série A1
- Season: 2000
- Champions: São Paulo (20th title)
- Relegated: América; Araçatuba
- Matches played: 170
- Goals scored: 535 (3.15 per match)
- Top goalscorer: França (São Paulo) - 18 goals
- Biggest home win: Matonense 7-0 Araçatuba (February 6, 2000)
- Biggest away win: Mogi Mirim 1-5 Portuguesa (April 23, 2000)
- Highest scoring: Mogi Mirim 4-7 União São João (February 13, 2000)

The 2000 Campeonato Paulista de Futebol Profissional da Primeira Divisão - Série A1 was the 99th season of São Paulo's top professional football league. São Paulo won the championship for the 20th time. América and Araçatuba were relegated.

== Championship ==
=== First phase ===
The first phase was disputed by all the teams of the championship, save for Corinthians, Palmeiras, Santos and São Paulo, which would dispute the Rio-São Paulo tournament at the time and would only enter in the second phase. The teams would be divided in two groups of six teams, and all would qualify for the second phase, except for the team with the fewest points out of the twelve, which would be relegated to the second phase of second level of that year, and replaced by the team that won the first phase of the second level.

==== Group 1 ====
Pos	Team	Pld	W	D	L	GF	GA	GD	Pts
1	Ponte Preta	10	7	2	1	20	10	+10	23
2	Portuguesa	10	5	3	2	23	12	+11	18
3	Matonense	10	5	1	4	22	13	+9	16
4	Portuguesa Santista	10	3	4	3	15	15	0	13
5	Araçatuba	10	2	2	6	9	25	-16	6
6	Inter de Limeira	10	1	2	7	11	25	-14	5

==== Group 2 ====
Pos	Team	Pld	W	D	L	GF	GA	GD	Pts
1	Guarani	10	5	4	1	17	10	+7	19
2	União Barbarense	10	5	2	3	17	12	+5	17
3	União São João	10	5	1	4	18	15	+3	16
4	Rio Branco	10	4	3	3	16	10	+6	15
5	Mogi Mirim	10	3	2	5	17	20	-3	11
6	América	10	0	4	6	8	26	-18	4

=== Second phase ===
In the second phase, the 11 qualified teams were joined by Botafogo, winner of the first phase of the second level, and the four participants of the Rio-São Paulo tournament. The 16 teams were divided in four groups of four teams, with each team playing twice against the teams of its own group, and once against the teams of other group (3 against 5 and 4 against 6), with the two best teams in each group qualifying to the Quarterfinals and the team with the fewest points among all the 16 being relegated to the Second level of the following year.

==== Group 3 ====
Pos	Team	Pld	W	D	L	GF	GA	GD	Pts
1	São Paulo	10	8	1	1	25	12	+13	25
2	Guarani	10	4	2	4	10	11	-1	14
3	União Barbarense	10	3	3	4	11	16	-5	12
4	Portuguesa Santista	10	3	1	6	12	14	-2	10

==== Group 4 ====
Pos	Team	Pld	W	D	L	GF	GA	GD	Pts
1	Corinthians	10	8	0	2	29	10	+19	24
2	Ponte Preta	10	4	3	3	14	13	+1	15
3	Matonense	10	3	5	2	15	12	+3	14
4	Araçatuba	10	1	1	8	7	27	-20	-16

==== Group 5 ====
Pos	Team	Pld	W	D	L	GF	GA	GD	Pts
1	Palmeiras	10	6	2	2	19	14	+5	20
2	Rio Branco	10	4	1	5	19	22	-3	13
3	União São João	10	1	6	3	15	18	-3	9
4	Botafogo	10	2	2	6	9	13	-4	8

==== Group 6 ====
Pos	Team	Pld	W	D	L	GF	GA	GD	Pts
1	Portuguesa	10	4	5	1	18	13	+5	17
2	Santos	10	4	4	2	19	15	+4	16
3	Inter de Limeira	10	3	2	5	13	15	-2	11
4	Mogi Mirim	10	3	0	7	10	20	-10	9

=== Quarterfinals ===
==== Group 7 ====
Pos	Team	Pld	W	D	L	GF	GA	GD	Pts
1	Santos	6	4	1	1	9	5	+4	13
2	São Paulo	6	3	2	1	13	7	+6	11
3	Portuguesa	6	2	1	3	10	11	-1	7
4	Guarani	6	1	0	5	5	14	-9	3

==== Group 8 ====
Pos	Team	Pld	W	D	L	GF	GA	GD	Pts
1	Corinthians	6	3	3	0	16	10	+6	12
2	Palmeiras	6	3	2	1	14	11	+3	11
3	Ponte Preta	6	2	0	4	9	14	-5	6
4	Rio Branco	6	0	3	3	6	10	-4	3

=== Semifinals ===
Team 1	Agg.	Team 2	1st leg	2nd leg
Santos	3–2	Palmeiras	0-0	3–2
São Paulo	4–1	Corinthians	2-1	2-0

=== Finals ===
Team 1	Agg.	Team 2	1st leg	2nd leg
Santos	2–3	São Paulo	0-1	2–2
