= Rogério Ceni =

Brazilian football player and coach (born 1973)

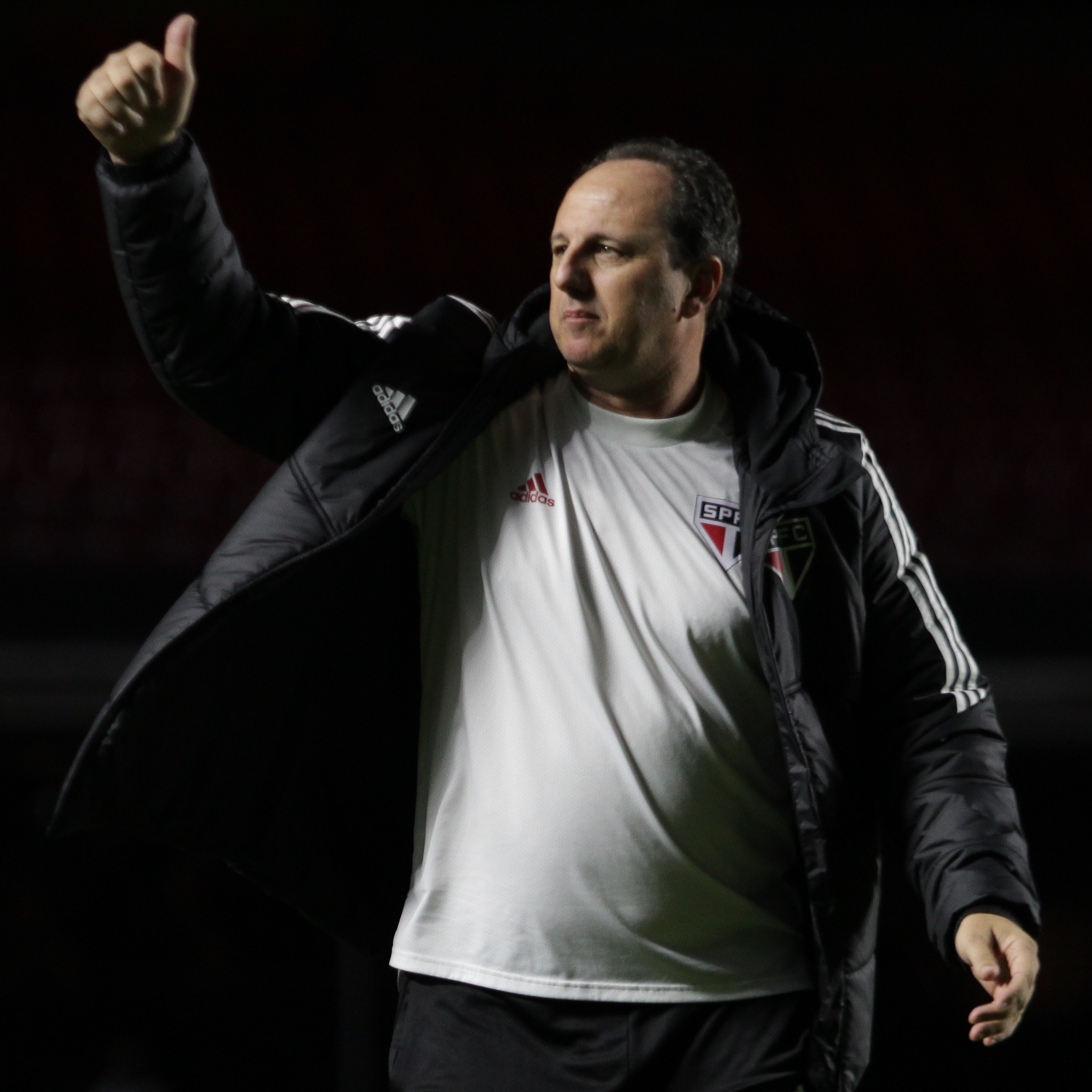
- Ceni with São Paulo in 2022

Personal information
- Full name: Rogério Mücke Ceni
- Date of birth: 22 January 1973 (age 53)
- Place of birth: Pato Branco, Brazil
- Height: 1.88 m (6 ft 2 in)
- Position: Goalkeeper

Team information
- Current team: Bahia (head coach)

Youth career
- 1990–1993: São Paulo

Senior career*
Years	Team	Apps	(Gls)
1990	Sinop	12	(0)
1993–2015	São Paulo	870	(103)
Total		882	(103)

International career
1997–2006	Brazil	17	(0)

Managerial career
- 2017: São Paulo
- 2018–2019: Fortaleza
- 2019: Cruzeiro
- 2019–2020: Fortaleza
- 2020–2021: Flamengo
- 2021–2023: São Paulo
- 2023–: Bahia
Medal record
Men's football
Representing Brazil
FIFA World Cup
Winner	2002 Korea/Japan
FIFA Confederations Cup
Winner	1997 Saudi Arabia
- * Club domestic league appearances and goals

Rogério Mücke Ceni (Brazilian Portuguese: [ʁoˈʒɛɾiu ˈsẽni]; born 22 January 1973) is a Brazilian professional football coach and former player who is in charge of Bahia. He is considered one of the all-time greatest Brazilian goalkeepers and is recognised by the International Federation of Football History & Statistics as the goalkeeper to have scored the most goals in the history of football. During the height of his career (2005–2008), he was also recognized as one of the best goalkeepers in the world.

Most of Ceni's vast professional career, which had spanned 25 years and 1,209 official club matches by Sinop (12) and São Paulo (1,197), 1237 total appearances by São Paulo being the player with most matches by the club, and also won 20 major titles, including three Brazilian Leagues, two Copa Libertadores, the 1993 Intercontinental Cup and the 2005 FIFA Club World Cup. He also scored 129 goals during his career, with most of them coming from free kicks and penalties and one coming from open play.

Ceni also represented Brazil 17 times over the course of his career, being part of the squads that won the 2002 FIFA World Cup and the 1997 FIFA Confederations Cup, and also taking part at the 2006 FIFA World Cup.

== Early life ==
Rogério Ceni was born 22 January 1973 in Pato Branco, Paraná. Ceni is of Italian and German descent. He holds Italian citizenship.

== Club career ==
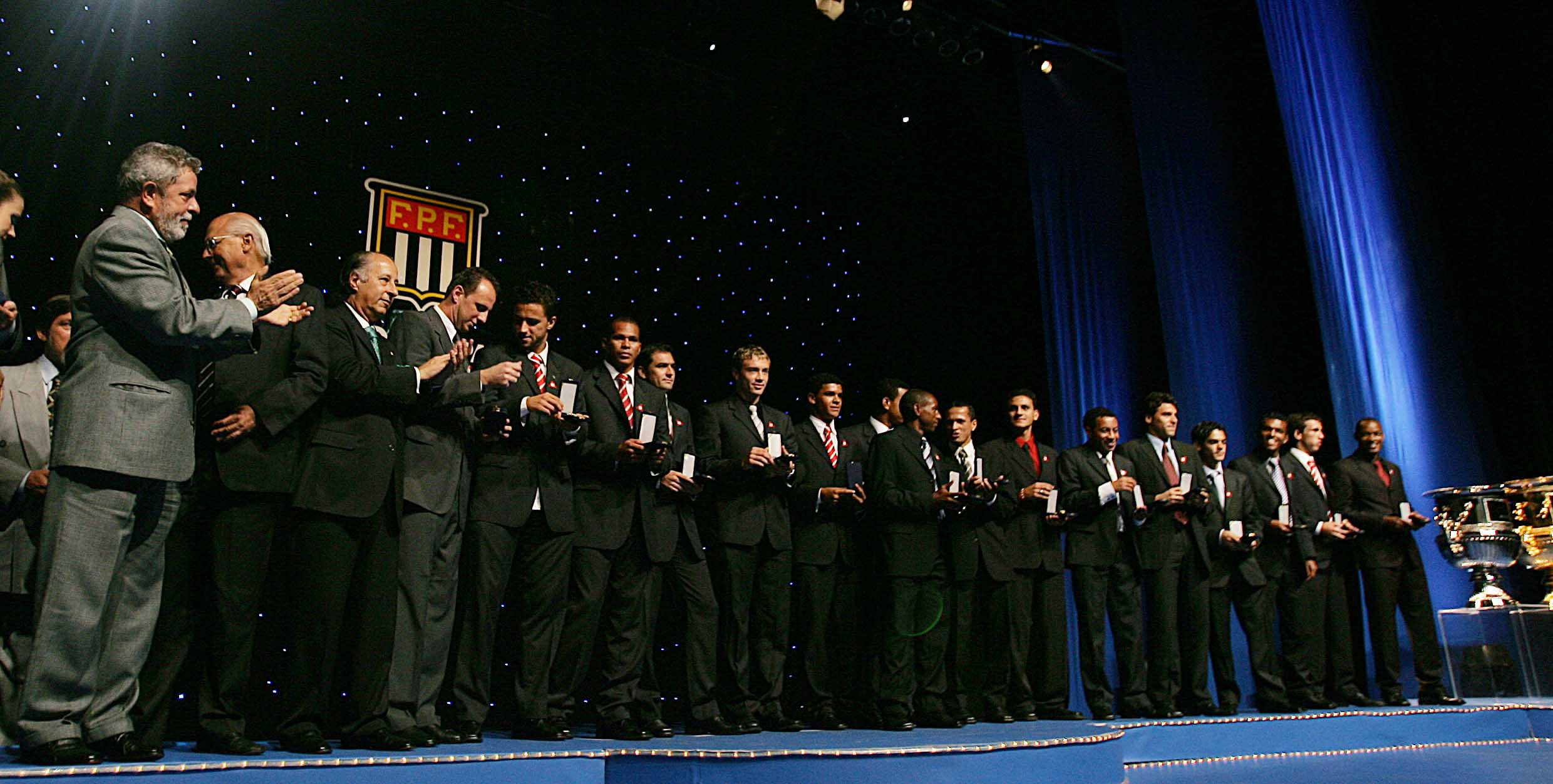
Ceni (fourth from left) with the São Paulo squad in 2005

Ceni made his senior debut with Sinop. In 1990, Ceni joined São Paulo, spending his first six seasons in Brazilian Série A as a backup or third-choice.

On 25 June 1993, Ceni made his first team debut, starting in a 4–1 win against Tenerife for the Trofeo Ciudad de Santiago de Compostela friendly championship. In the following year, he was utilized as a starter in the 1994 Copa CONMEBOL, appearing in all matches as his side was crowned champions.

In the 1997 season, after Zetti moved to Santos, Ceni was chosen as his replacement. On 14 July 2005, Ceni was São Paulo's captain as the team won the 2005 Copa Libertadores, a third for the club. Two weeks later, in a match against Atlético Mineiro, he broke the record for most appearances for the team, with 618 matches – he wore a special commemorative jersey that had the number "618" printed on the back; on 25 July of the following year, he scored a penalty against Mexican side Guadalajara (also a match-winner), becoming the Tricolor's all-time leading scorer in the Libertadores.

From 2005 to 2007, he scored an astonishing 47 goals in all competitions combined, as the club won two national championships and the 2005 FIFA Club World Cup; in the latter competition, he netted in the semifinals against Ittihad (3–2, through a penalty kick), and was voted Man of the match in the final against Liverpool, as well as the tournament's MVP.

On 20 August 2006, Ceni scored his 63rd and record-breaking goal by netting a free kick against Cruzeiro in the domestic league, a few minutes after denying a penalty to the opposition. Later in the same match, he scored a goal from the spot and took his total to 64, also tying the match 2–2; this put him two goals ahead of the previous holder, Paraguayan José Luis Chilavert.

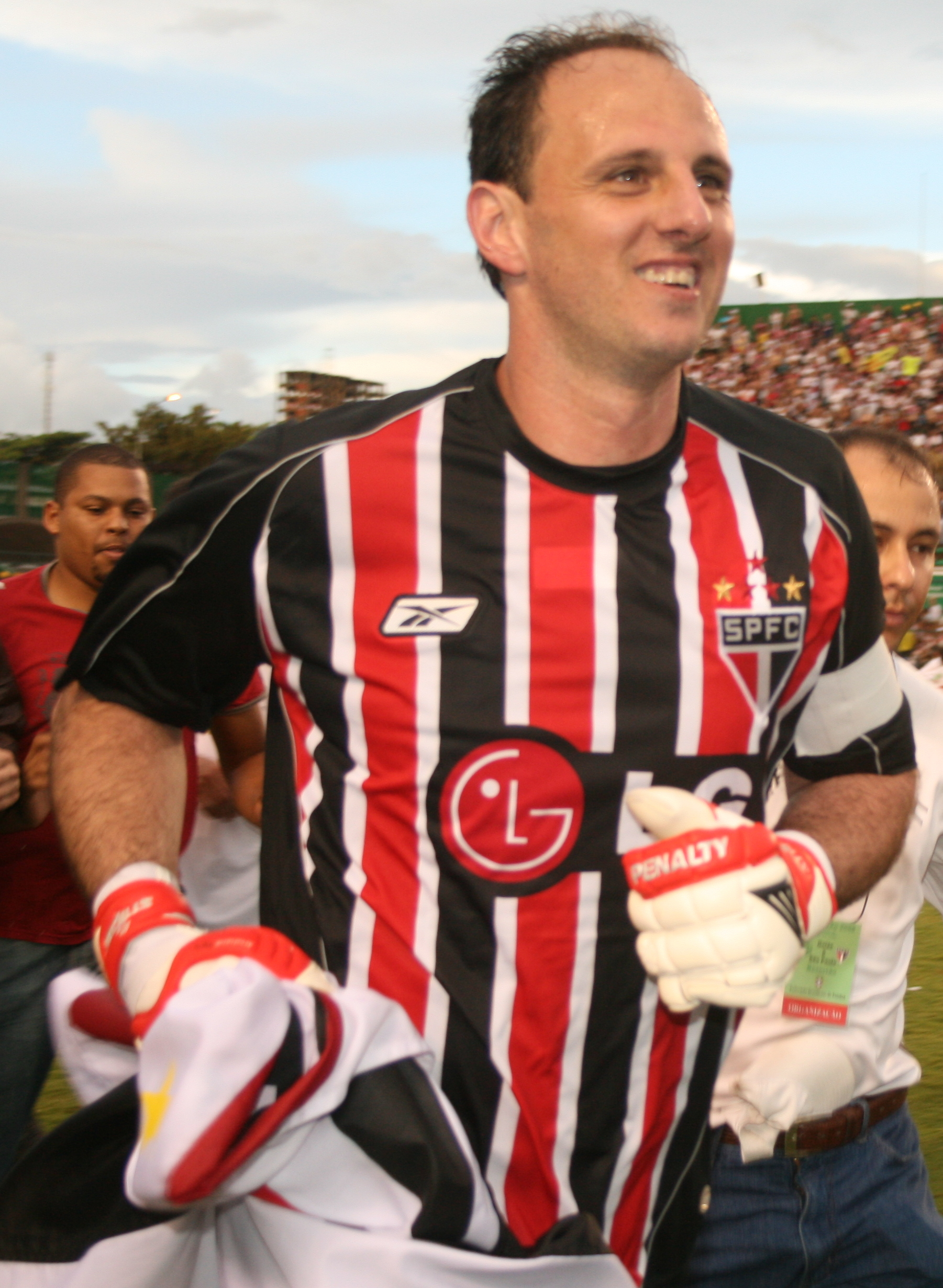
Ceni with São Paulo in 2008

On 29 October 2006, Ceni made his 700th official appearance for São Paulo, against Figueirense in a 2–0 victory. Some of the gloss was taken off the occasion when the player was ordered to change his bright yellow jersey because it matched with the referee's; at the end of the 2007 season, which ended in league conquest, he was voted by the Brazilian Football Confederation as the Best Player.

In April 2009, Ceni fractured his ankle in training, being initially sidelined for six months, but recovering sooner than expected. On 28 October 2010, against Atlético Paranaense, he played his 700th game as club captain. The following year, on 27 March, he scored from a free kick to win the match against arch rivals Corinthians, shooting from 18 metres for his 100th goal.

On 7 September 2011, Ceni made his 1,000th appearance for São Paulo. In late January of the following year, the 39-year-old underwent an operation on his shoulder, losing six months of competition.

On 1 June 2012, Ceni returned to the field, scoring from a direct free kick in a 2–0 Copa Sudamericana away win against Bahia; his side went on to win that year's tournament. He subsequently scored three goals in the league, ending the campaign as a starter.

Despite already being aged 40, Ceni stated that his spirit for competition was the same as an eighteen-year-old's, but still stating that his recovery is harder than years ago. On 14 July 2013, Ceni scored his 111th goal from a free kick in a 2–3 loss at Vitória.

On 7 December 2013, after lengthy negotiations, Ceni renewed his contract with Tricolor for a further season. On 20 April 2014, in a 3–0 home win against Botafogo, he had three records recognized by Guinness World Records: most goals scored by a goalkeeper, number of games played for the same club and number of times as captain.

On 27 October 2014, Ceni broke Ryan Giggs' record for most wins at a single club after playing in São Paulo's 3–0 win over Goiás. He finished the campaign with eight league goals (his best goal scoring record within seven years), being an undisputed starter.

On 28 November 2014, Ceni signed a new deal with São Paulo, until August 2015, despite previously stating that he would retire at the end of the season. On 29 March 2015, after scoring in a 3–0 home win against Linense, he surpassed Marcelinho Carioca in the number of goals scored by direct free kicks for only one club, with Ceni having 60 and Marcelinho, 59.

In June 2015, Ceni scored his 128th goal, entering in the club's top 10 goalscorers list. Ceni announced his retirement from professional football on 6 December 2015.

== International career ==
A Brazilian international for nine years, Ceni collected 17 caps. He was selected to the squads that won the 1997 FIFA Confederations Cup and the 2002 FIFA World Cup (as well as the 2006 World Cup, still not fully recovered from his knee injury). However, he only appeared in two games in final stages: the 3–2 win against Mexico in the first tournament and the 4–1 triumph over Japan in the third.

== Coaching career ==
=== São Paulo ===
In December 2016, Ceni was appointed as São Paulo coach, with Englishman Michael Beale and Frenchman Charles Hembert joining as his assistants. On 3 July 2017, after poor results – São Paulo were eliminated in State League, Brazilian Cup and 2017 Copa Sudamericana into a period of one month and were in the relegation zone in Brazilian League, he was sacked.

=== Fortaleza ===
Ceni signed with Fortaleza to coach the team in 2018. On 3 November of that year, Fortaleza clinched promotion to the Série A, and seven days later, the club clinched the Série B title for the first time in its history. In 2019, Fortaleza also won the Campeonato Cearense and the Copa do Nordeste.

=== Cruzeiro ===
On 11 August 2019, Ceni was named Cruzeiro head coach, but was dismissed on 26 September, after having altercations with the club's main players, specifically Thiago Neves and Dedé.

=== Fortaleza return ===
Three days after his dismissal from Cruzeiro, Ceni was announced at his former side Fortaleza, replacing fired Zé Ricardo. On 22 October 2020, he again won the Ceará state title, his fourth title with Fortaleza.

=== Flamengo ===
On 10 November 2020, Ceni agreed to a contract with Flamengo until December 2021, replacing the sacked Domènec Torrent. He won the 2020 Série A with the club, but was sacked on 10 July 2021.

=== São Paulo return ===
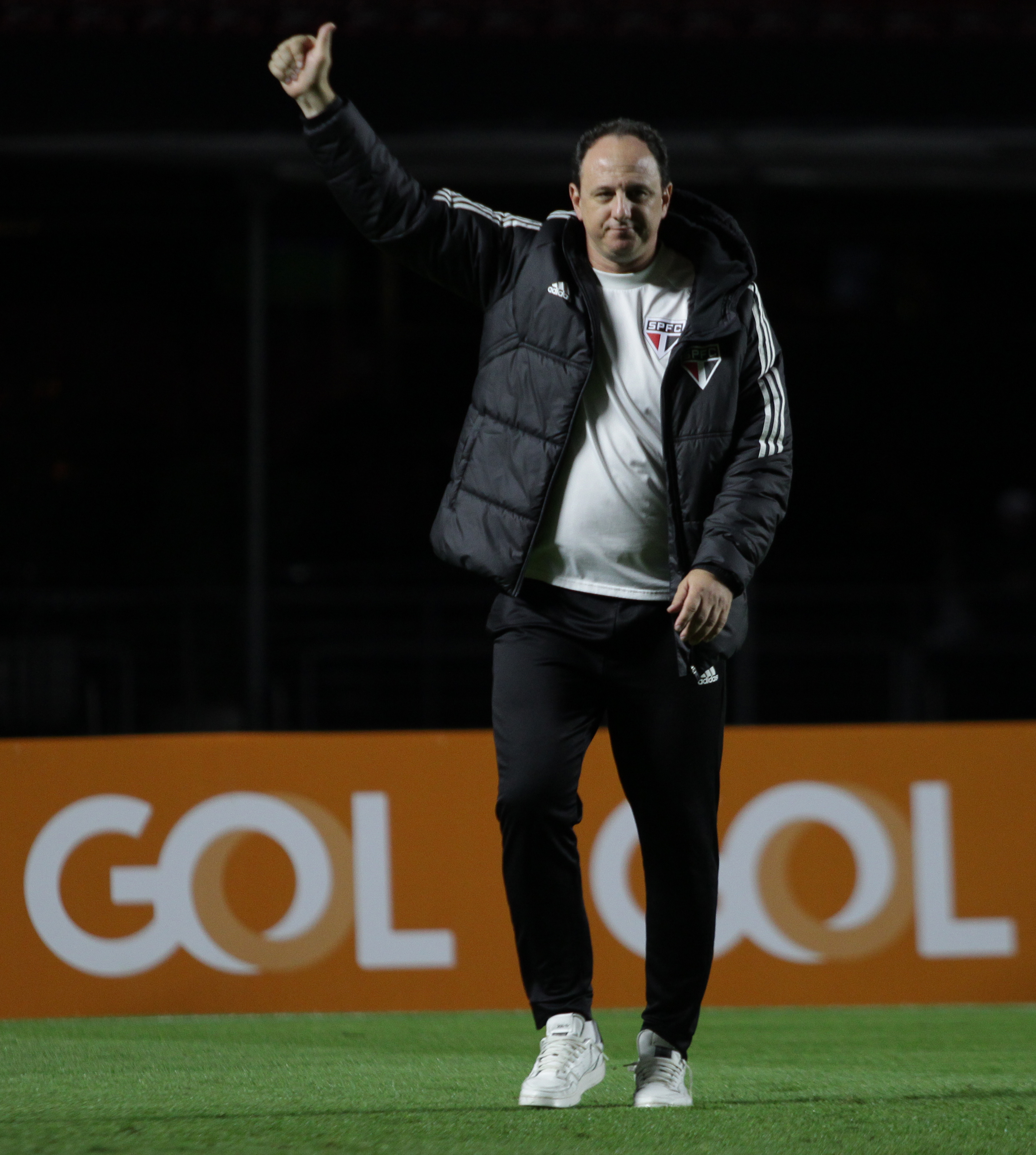
Ceni as head coach of São Paulo in 2022

Ceni returned to São Paulo on 13 October 2021, being named head coach in the place of Hernán Crespo. He lost both the 2022 Campeonato Paulista and the 2022 Copa Sudamericana Finals, against Palmeiras and Independiente del Valle, respectively.

On 19 April 2023, Ceni was sacked from Tricolor.

=== Bahia ===
On 9 September 2023, Ceni replaced Renato Paiva at the helm of Bahia.

== Style of play ==
A dead-ball specialist, Ceni was the official taker of free kicks and penalties for São Paulo from 1997 until his retirement, amassing 131 goals over the course of his career. In addition to his accurate set-pieces, prolific goalscoring, distribution, and ability with the ball at his feet, he was also known as an excellent goalkeeper and shot-stopper, and stood out for his determination and longevity throughout his career, as he retired at over 40 years of age. Ceni was known for being capable of producing brilliant saves, such as those in the final of the 2005 FIFA Club World Cup, which saw São Paulo defeat Liverpool 1–0; for his performances, Ceni later won the Golden Ball, which is awarded to the competition's best player. He is considered to be one of Brazil's greatest goalkeepers ever.

== Career statistics ==
=== Club ===
Appearances and goals by club, season and competition
Club	Season	League			State league (Note: Includes Campeonato Mato-Grossense, Campeonato Paulista)		Copa do Brasil		Continental		Other		Total	
Club	Season	Division	Apps	Goals	Apps	Goals	Apps	Goals	Apps	Goals	Apps	Goals	Apps	Goals
Sinop	1990	Mato-Grossense	—		12	0	—		—		—		12	0
São Paulo	1993	Série A	1	0	0	0	0	0	0	0	2 (Note: Appearance(s) in CONMEBOL Gold Cup)	0	3	0
São Paulo	1994	Série A	5	0	3	0	0	0	8 (Note: Appearance(s) in Copa CONMEBOL)	0	5 (Note: Appearance(s) in Copa Bandeirantes)	0	21	0
São Paulo	1995	Série A	4	0	12	0	4	0	—		—		20	0
São Paulo	1996	Série A	0	0	2	0	0	0	0	0	2 (Note: One appearance in Copa Master de CONMEBOL, one appearance in CONMEBOL Gold Cup)	0	4	0
São Paulo	1997	Série A	25	2	25	1	4	0	9 (Note: Appearance(s) in Supercopa Libertadores)	0	4 (Note: Appearance(s) in Torneio Rio – São Paulo)	0	67	3
São Paulo	1998	Série A	22	0	14	2	6	0	5 (Note: Appearance(s) in Copa Mercosur)	0	10	0	57	2
São Paulo	1999	Série A	23	1	16	3	3	0	6	1	10 (Note: Eight appearances in Torneio Rio – São Paulo, two appearances in Seletiva para a Libertadores)	0	58	5
São Paulo	2000	Série A	24	3	20	3	12	1	5	0	12 (Note: Eight appearances in Torneio Rio – São Paulo, four appearances in Copa dos Campeões)	0	73	7
São Paulo	2001	Série A	22	0	12	1	6	0	4	0	12 (Note: Six appearances in Torneio Rio – São Paulo, six appearances and one goal in Copa dos Campeões)	2	56	1
São Paulo	2002	Série A	21	1	—		8	1	0	0	21 (Note: Nineteen appearances and three goals in Torneio Rio – São Paulo, two appearances in Copa dos Campeões)	3	50	5
São Paulo	2003	Série A	40	2	11	0	6	0	8 (Note: Appearance(s) in Copa Sudamericana)	0	—		65	2
São Paulo	2004	Série A	44	3	9	0	—		16 (Note: Twelve appearances and two goals in Copa Libertadores, four appearances in Copa Sudamericana)	2	—		69	5
São Paulo	2005	Série A	38	10	19	5	—		16 (Note: Fourteen appearances and five goals in Copa Libertadores, two appearances in Copa Sudamericana)	5	2 (Note: Appearance(s) in FIFA Club World Cup)	1	75	21
São Paulo	2006	Série A	29	8	13	5	—		13 (Note: Appearance(s) in Copa Libertadores)	3	2 (Note: Appearance(s) in Recopa Sudamericana)	0	57	16
São Paulo	2007	Série A	35	7	20	2	—		13 (Note: Eight appearances in Copa Libertadores, five appearances and one goal in Copa Sudamericana)	1	—		68	10
São Paulo	2008	Série A	35	4	21	1	—		11 (Note: Ten appearances in Copa Libertadores, one appearance in Copa Sudamericana)	0	—		67	5
São Paulo	2009	Série A	16	2	15	0	—		3	0	—		34	2
São Paulo	2010	Série A	38	4	20	3	—		12	1	—		70	8
São Paulo	2011	Série A	36	2	21	6	7	0	4	0	—		68	8
São Paulo	2012	Série A	24	3	0	0	0	0	10	1	—		34	4
São Paulo	2013	Série A	35	2	13	1	—		16 (Note: Ten appearances and three goals in Copa Libertadores, six appearances in Copa Sudamericana)	3	3 (Note: Two appearances in Recopa Sudamericana, one appearance in Suruga Bank Championship)	0	67	6
São Paulo	2014	Série A	35	8	14	1	6	1	8	0	—		63	10
São Paulo	2015	Série A	23	3	15	4	5	1	8	0	—		51	8
São Paulo	Total		575	65	295	38	67	4	175	17	85	5	1197	129
Career total			575	65	307	38	67	4	175	17	85	5	1209	129

=== International ===
Appearances and goals by national team and year
National team	Year	Apps	Goals
Brazil	1997	1	0
Brazil	1998	2	0
Brazil	1999	3	0
Brazil	2000	3	0
Brazil	2001	4	0
Brazil	2002	1	0
Brazil	2003	0	0
Brazil	2004	1	0
Brazil	2005	0	0
Brazil	2006	2	0
Total		17	0

== Coaching statistics ==
As of match played 18 November 2026

Coaching record by team and tenure
Team	Nat	From	To	Record								Ref
Team	Nat	From	To	G	W	D	L	GF	GA	GD	Win %	Ref
São Paulo	(Brazil)	19 January 2017	3 July 2017	37	14	13	10	55	39	+16	37.84	
Fortaleza	(Brazil)	10 November 2017	11 August 2019	95	52	18	25	137	83	+54	54.74	
Cruzeiro	(Brazil)	12 August 2019	26 September 2019	8	2	2	4	8	12	−4	25.00	
Fortaleza	(Brazil)	29 September 2019	9 November 2020	54	26	15	13	86	47	+39	48.15	
Flamengo	(Brazil)	10 November 2020	10 July 2021	54	30	12	12	101	58	+43	55.56	
São Paulo	(Brazil)	13 October 2021	19 April 2023	107	50	28	29	158	108	+50	46.73	
Bahia	(Brazil)	8 September 2023	Present	210	106	44	60	336	232	+104	50.48	
Total				563	280	130	153	881	579	+302	49.73	—

== Honours ==
=== Player ===
Sinop

- Campeonato Mato-Grossense: 1990

São Paulo

- Intercontinental Cup: 1993
- FIFA Club World Cup: 2005
- Copa Libertadores: 1993, 2005
- Campeonato Brasileiro Série A: 2006, 2007, 2008
- Campeonato Paulista: 1992, 1998, 2000, 2005
- Recopa Sudamericana: 1993, 1994
- Supercopa Libertadores: 1993
- Copa CONMEBOL: 1994
- Copa Master de CONMEBOL: 1996
- Torneio Rio-São Paulo: 2001
- Copa Sudamericana: 2012

Brazil

- FIFA World Cup: 2002
- FIFA Confederations Cup: 1997

Individual

- Bola de Prata: 2000, 2003, 2004, 2006, 2007, 2008
- Bola de Ouro: 2008
- Bola de Prata – Conjunto da Obra: 2015
- Copa Libertadores Best Player: 2005
- FIFA Club World Cup Golden Ball: 2005
- FIFA Club World Cup MVP of the Final Match Trophy: 2005
- Troféu Mesa Redonda best player: 2005
- Campeonato Brasileiro Série A Player of the Year: 2006, 2007
- Campeonato Brasileiro Série A Team of the Year: 2006, 2007
- Prêmio Craque da Galera: 2007, 2014
- IFFHS World's Highest Scoring Goalkeeper of the 21st Century 2001–2020

=== Manager ===
Fortaleza

- Campeonato Brasileiro Série B: 2018
- Campeonato Cearense: 2019, 2020
- Copa do Nordeste: 2019

Flamengo

- Campeonato Brasileiro Série A: 2020
- Supercopa do Brasil: 2021
- Campeonato Carioca: 2021

Bahia

- Campeonato Baiano: 2025, 2026
- Copa do Nordeste: 2025

Individual

- Campeonato Cearense Best Coach: 2019, 2020
- Campeonato Paulista Best Coach: 2022
- Bola de Prata: 2020

== See also ==
- List of men's footballers with the most official appearances
- List of world association football records
- List of goals scored by Rogério Ceni
- List of goalscoring goalkeepers
