= 2005 Campeonato Paulista =

Campeonato Paulista - Série A1
- Season: 2005
- Champions: São Paulo (22nd title)
- Relegated: União Barbarense; União São João; Atlético Sorocaba; Inter de Limeira
- Matches: 190
- Goals: 609 (3.21 per match)
- Top goalscorer: Finazzi (17 goals)

The 2005 Campeonato Paulista de Futebol Profissional da Primeira Divisão - Série A1 was the 104th season of São Paulo's top professional football league. The competition began on 19 January and ended on 17 April. São Paulo became the champions for the 22nd time.

== Teams ==
Club	Home city	2004 result
América	São José do Rio Preto	12th
Atlético Sorocaba	Sorocaba	15th
Corinthians	São Paulo (Tatuapé)	16th
Guarani	Campinas	17th
Inter de Limeira	Limeira	1st (Série A2)
Ituano	Itu	14th
Marília	Marília	10th
Mogi Mirim	Mogi Mirim	18th
Palmeiras	São Paulo (Perdizes)	4th
Paulista	Jundiaí	2nd
Ponte Preta	Campinas	7th
Portuguesa	São Paulo (Pari)	13th
Portuguesa Santista	Santos	6th
Rio Branco	Americana	11th
Santo André	Santo André	9th
Santos	Santos	3rd
São Caetano	São Caetano do Sul	1st
São Paulo	São Paulo (Morumbi)	5th
União Barbarense	Santa Bárbara d'Oeste	8th
União São João	Araras	19th

== League table ==
Pos	Team	Pld	W	D	L	GF	GA	GD	Pts
1	São Paulo (C)	19	14	3	2	49	21	+28	45
2	Corinthians	19	11	4	4	33	15	+18	37
3	Santos	19	10	7	2	38	21	+17	37
4	Santo André	19	10	3	6	34	27	+7	33
5	São Caetano	19	10	2	7	35	30	+5	32
6	Paulista	19	9	4	6	33	25	+8	31
7	Ituano	19	8	4	7	34	34	0	28
8	Mogi Mirim	19	8	3	8	31	37	−6	27
9	Palmeiras	19	7	4	8	31	32	−1	25
10	Portuguesa	19	6	6	7	27	32	−5	24
11	Guarani	19	6	6	7	20	25	−5	24
12	Marília	19	6	5	8	25	31	−6	23
13	Portuguesa Santista	19	6	5	8	19	26	−7	23
14	América	19	8	4	7	37	30	+7	22 (Note: América deducted six points for fielding an ineligible player.)
15	Ponte Preta	19	6	4	9	28	33	−5	22
16	Rio Branco	19	6	3	10	27	34	−7	21
17	União Barbarense	19	5	5	9	25	30	−5	20
18	União São João	19	5	5	9	31	46	−15	20
19	Atlético Sorocaba	19	4	4	11	26	37	−11	16
20	Inter de Limeira	19	3	3	13	25	42	−17	12

(C) Champions

== Top goalscorers ==
Rank	Player	Team	Goals
1	(Brazil) Finazzi	América	17
2	(Brazil) Deivid	Santos	12
2	(Brazil) Diego Tardelli	São Paulo	12
3	(Brazil) Robinho	Santos	11
4	(Brazil) Rômulo	Ituano	10
4	(Argentina) Frontini	Marília	10
4	(Brazil) Sandro Gaúcho	Santo André	10
4	(Brazil) Borges	União São João	10
5	(Brazil) Roger	Ponte Preta	9
5	(Brazil) Marcinho	São Caetano	9

== See also ==
- Copa Paulista de Futebol
- Campeonato Paulista Série A2
- Campeonato Paulista Série A3
- Campeonato Paulista Segunda Divisão
