= Yuri (footballer, born 1984) =

Brazilian footballer

Personal information
- Full name: Yuri Adriano Santos
- Date of birth: 27 April 1984 (age 42)
- Place of birth: Osasco, Brazil
- Height: 1.84 m (6 ft 0 in)
- Position: Goalkeeper

Youth career
- Sambra
- Escolinha do Gererê
- Baroninho Gol
- Cruzeiro
- XV de Jaú

Senior career*
Years	Team	Apps	(Gls)
- XV de Jaú
- Mogi Mirim
- Rio Verde
2006	Catanduvense	18	(0)
2007	Taubaté	10	(0)
2007	Catanduvense	0	(0)
2008	São Bento	1	(0)
2008	Comercial-SP	0	(0)
2009	XV de Jaú	17	(0)
2009	Marília		
2009–2013	Noroeste	33	(0)
2014	Novorizontino	26	(0)
2014	Mirassol	0	(0)
Total		95	(0)
- * Club domestic league appearances and goals

Yuri Adriano Santos (born 27 April 1984), commonly known as Yuri, is a Brazilian former professional footballer who played as a goalkeeper.

== Career ==
Born in Osasco, Yuri moved to Bauru at the age of one. He joined a local football school named Sambra in 1994, initially playing outfield before being named goalkeeper of the tournament at a youth competition his team finished second in. He continued as a goalkeeper for the youth teams Escolinha do Gererê and Baroninho Gol, before joining the academy of professional club Cruzeiro.

He later moved to the academy of XV de Jaú in Jaú, São Paulo, and at the age of sixteen he made his debut for the club in the Campeonato Paulista Série A3. He remained in São Paulo, playing for Mogi Mirim, Catanduvense, Taubaté and São Bento and Comercial, as well as having a spell with Rio Verde in Goiás, before returning to XV de Jaú in 2009.

A short spell with Marília was followed by a return to Bauru with Noroeste in August 2009. He made his debut for the club the following month in a 1–1 draw against Ferroviária. He would only make one further appearance in 2009, before ten in the following season. Five appearances in 2011 were followed by only one in 2012, yet he signed a contract extension at the end of the season, taking a pay-cut to do so.

A productive last season with the club saw Yuri make thirty total appearances in the 2013 season. He moved to Novorizontino in 2014, where he won that year's edition of the Campeonato Paulista Série A3. A short spell with Mirassol followed, before he retired from the semi-professional game. He continued to play amateur football in Bauru, notably representing Independência, where he won the 'best goalkeeper' award in 2023 and 2024.

== Career statistics ==
Appearances and goals by club, season and competition
Club	Season	League			State League		Cup (Note: Includes Copa do Brasil)		Other		Total	
Club	Season	Division	Apps	Goals	Apps	Goals	Apps	Goals	Apps	Goals	Apps	Goals
Catanduvense	2006	–			18 (Note: Appearances in the Campeonato Paulista Segunda Divisão)	0	0	0	0	0	18	0
Taubaté	2007	–			10 (Note: Appearances in the Campeonato Paulista A2)	0	0	0	0	0	10	0
Catanduvense	2007	–			0	0	0	0	2 (Note: Appearances in the Copa Paulista)	0	2	0
São Bento	2008	–			1	0	0	0	0	0	1	0
Comercial-SP	2008	–			0	0	0	0	20	0	20	0
XV de Jaú	2009	–			17 (Note: Appearances in the Campeonato Paulista A3)	0	0	0	0	0	17	0
Noroeste	2009	–			0	0	0	0	2	0	2	0
Noroeste	2010	–			10	0	0	0	0	0	10	0
Noroeste	2011	–			3 (Note: Appearances in the Campeonato Paulista)	0	0	0	2	0	5	0
Noroeste	2012	–			1	0	0	0	0	0	1	0
Noroeste	2013	–			19	0	2	0	9	0	30	0
Noroeste	Total		0	0	33	0	2	0	13	0	48	0
Novorizontino	2014	–			26	0	0	0	0	0	26	0
Mirassol	2014	–			0	0	0	0	12	0	12	0
Career total			0	0	95	0	2	0	47	0	144	0
