= Vidas Dančenka =

Lithuanian footballer

Personal information
- Date of birth: 2 August 1973 (age 53)
- Place of birth: Telšiai, Lithuanian SSR, Soviet Union
- Height: 1.74 m (5 ft 9 in)
- Position: Forward

Senior career*
Years	Team	Apps	(Gls)
1993–1995	ROMAR Mažeikiai		
1995	Tervis Pärnu		
1995–1999	Kareda Šiauliai	79	(52)
1998	Rubin Kazan	2	(0)
1999–2000	Uralan Elista	44	(3)
2001	Lokomotiv Nizhny Novgorod	5	(0)
2002–2003	Atlantas	43	(12)
2004–2005	Babrungas Plungė		
2006	Vėtra	4	(0)

International career
1997–2000	Lithuania	4	(1)
- * Club domestic league appearances and goals

Vidas Dančenka (born 2 August 1973) is a former Lithuanian international football player.

== Club career ==
In the 1997–1998 season he was LFF A lyga top scorer with 26 goals.

== Career statistics ==
=== International ===
Appearances and goals by national team and year
National team	Year	Apps	Goals
Lithuania	1997	1	0
Lithuania	1998	–	
Lithuania	1999	1	0
Lithuania	2000	2	1
Total		4	1

Scores and results list Lithuania's goal tally first, score column indicates score after each Dančenka goal.

List of international goals scored by Vidas Dančenka
No.	Date	Venue	Opponent	Score	Result	Competition
1	26 April 2000	Darius and Girėnas Stadium, Kaunas, Lithuania	Latvia	1–1	2–1	Friendly
