= Júlio César (footballer, born January 1978) =

Brazilian footballer

Personal information
- Full name: Júlio César Martins
- Date of birth: 4 January 1978 (age 48)
- Place of birth: Londrina, Brazil
- Height: 1.88 m (6 ft 2 in)
- Position: Goalkeeper

Senior career*
Years	Team	Apps	(Gls)
2004–2006	Santo André		
2006–2007	Marília		
2008–2009	São Caetano		
2009–2010	Santo André	53	(0)
2011	Botafogo-SP	18	(0)
2011	Ponte Preta	37	(0)
2012	Vila Nova	30	(0)
2013	Red Bull Brasil	25	(0)
2013–2016	CRB	111	(0)
2017	Capivariano	6	(0)
- * Club domestic league appearances and goals

Júlio César Martins (born 4 January 1978) is a Brazilian former footballer who played as a goalkeeper.

== Career ==
Júlio César has played for Santo André at Copa do Brasil 2004, played 3 matches, behind first choice Júnior Costa. But at 2005 Copa Libertadores, he played as first choice.

In December 2007 he signed a one-year contract with São Caetano, Santo André's club rival. He was offered a one-year extension in December 2008.

== Honours ==
- Copa do Brasil: 2004

== Career statistics ==
Club performance			League		Cup		Continental		Total	
Season	Club	League	Apps	Goals	Apps	Goals	Apps	Goals	Apps	Goals
Brazil			League		Copa do Brasil		South America		Total	
2004	Santo André	Brasileiro Série B			3	0				
2005	Santo André	Brasileiro Série B					5	0		
2006	Santo André	Brasileiro Série B	1	0	2	0			3	0
2006	Marília	Brasileiro Série B		?						
2007	Marília	Brasileiro Série B		?					?	?
2008	São Caetano	Brasileiro Série B			3	0				
2009	São Caetano	Brasileiro Série B	?	?						
2009	Santo André	Brasileiro Série A	0	0						
2010	Santo André	Brasileiro Série B	?	?					?	?
Career total					8	0	5	0		
