= 2001 Campeonato Paulista =

Campeonato Paulista - Série A1
- Season: 2001
- Champions: Corinthians (24th title)
- Relegated: Guarani; Mogi Mirim
- Matches: 126
- Goals: 459 (3.64 per match)
- Top goalscorer: Washington (Ponte Preta) - 14 goals
- Biggest home win: Portuguesa 6-1 União São João (January 21, 2001); Santos 5-0 Portuguesa Santista (January 28, 2001); União São João 7-2 Portuguesa Santista (February 18, 2001); Corinthians 5-0 Santos (March 18, 2001); Matonense 5-0 Portuguesa Santista (April 22, 2001); São Caetano 5-0 União Barbarense (April 28, 2001)
- Biggest away win: Guarani 0-4 Rio Branco (March 18, 2001); União Barbarense 1-5 Palmeiras (March 18, 2001); Botafogo 1-5 Corinthians (April 15, 2001); Mogi Mirim 1-5 Santos (April 28, 2001)
- Highest scoring: União São João 7-2 Portuguesa Santista (February 18, 2001); Matonense 4-5 Santos (April 7, 2001)

The 2001 Campeonato Paulista de Futebol Profissional da Primeira Divisão - Série A1 was the 100th season of São Paulo's top professional football league. The first stage of the championship was played in a round-robin, with all the teams playing each other once; ties were broken through penalty shootouts, with ties with goals being worth two points for the winner and one for the loser, and goalless ties netting one point for the winner and no points for the loser. the four best-placed teams advanced to the semifinals. Corinthians won the championship for the 24th time. Guarani and Mogi Mirim were relegated, however, their relegations were cancelled as both teams were invited into the Rio-São Paulo league in the following year.

== Championship ==
Pos	Team	Pld	W	PWG	PWL	PLG	PLL	L	GF	GA	GD	Pts
1	Ponte Preta	15	9	1	0	2	1	2	26	16	+10	31
2	Santos	15	9	1	0	0	0	5	37	24	+13	29
3	Corinthians	15	8	0	0	2	0	5	39	27	+12	26
4	Botafogo	15	5	5	0	1	0	4	23	25	−2	26
5	São Caetano	15	6	3	0	1	0	5	29	22	+7	25
6	Rio Branco	15	5	4	0	2	0	4	32	25	+7	25
7	Palmeiras	15	7	1	0	1	1	5	28	25	+3	24
8	São Paulo	15	6	3	0	0	0	6	32	26	+6	24
9	Portuguesa	15	6	1	0	1	0	7	28	34	−6	21
10	União São João	15	6	0	0	2	0	7	34	34	0	20
11	Portuguesa Santista	15	6	0	0	2	1	6	25	39	−14	20
12	Inter de Limeira	15	4	1	1	3	0	6	26	21	+5	18
13	Matonense	15	5	0	1	1	0	8	25	31	−6	17
14	União Barbarense	15	3	2	1	2	0	7	21	36	−15	16
15	Guarani	15	4	0	1	2	1	7	16	25	−9	15
16	Mogi Mirim	15	2	3	0	3	0	7	21	32	−11	15

=== Semifinals ===
Team 1	Agg.	Team 2	1st leg	2nd leg
Corinthians	3–2	Santos	1-1	2–1
Botafogo	5–4	Ponte Preta	2-1	3-3

=== Finals ===
Team 1	Agg.	Team 2	1st leg	2nd leg
Botafogo	0–3	Corinthians	0-0	0–3
