= Alexandre Fávaro =

Brazilian footballer

Personal information
- Full name: Alexandre Fávaro Corrêa
- Date of birth: 21 May 1977 (age 49)
- Place of birth: Paulínia, Brazil
- Height: 1.89 m (6 ft 2 in)
- Position: Goalkeeper

Youth career
- –1997: Ponte Preta

Senior career*
Years	Team	Apps	(Gls)
1997–2001	Ponte Preta		
2002	América-SP		
2002–2004	Cruzeiro		
2003	→ Paysandu (loan)		
2004–2005	Paysandu		
2006	Brasiliense		
2007	Boavista-RJ		
2008	Mirassol		
2009	Ituano		
2009	Fortaleza		
2010–2011	Paysandu		
2012	Ferroviário		

International career
1999	Brazil U23	1	(0)
- * Club domestic league appearances and goals as of 30 November 2023

Alexandre Fávaro (born 21 May 1977), is a Brazilian former professional footballer who played as a goalkeeper.

== Career ==
Alexandre began his professional career at Ponte Preta in 1997, and was the goalkeeper who conceded the least goals in the 1999 Brazilian Championship and stood out again in the 2001 state championship. He transferred to América and later to Cruzeiro, but without standing out. He was loaned to Paysandu, where he established himself, being signed permanently. He would still play for Brasiliense, Boavista, Ituano, Mirassol among others. In 1999 he was called up to the Brazil under-23 team, where he made an appearance against Australia in a friendly.

== Honours ==
Paysandu

- Campeonato Paraense: 2005, 2010

Brasiliense

- Campeonato Brasiliense: 2006
