= 1998 Campeonato Paulista =

Campeonato Paulista - Série A1
- Season: 1998
- Champions: São Paulo
- Relegated: Juventus
- Matches played: 138
- Goals scored: 480 (3.48 per match)
- Top goalscorer: França (São Paulo) - 12 goals
- Biggest home win: São Paulo 5-0 Rio Branco (March 12, 1998); Santos 5-0 São José (April 2, 1998); São Paulo 6-1 São José (April 12, 1998)
- Biggest away win: União São João 0-4 Guarani (March 14, 1998); São José 1-5 São Paulo (March 2, 1998)
- Highest scoring: Portuguesa Santista 4-4 Portuguesa (March 1, 1998); Santos 6-2 Matonense (March 19, 1998)

The 1998 Campeonato Paulista de Futebol Profissional da Primeira Divisão - Série A1 was the 97th season of São Paulo's top professional football league. São Paulo won the championship for their 19th Campeonato Paulista title. Juventus was relegated.

== Championship ==
=== First phase ===
The first phase was disputed by all the teams of the championship, except for Corinthians, Palmeiras, Santos and São Paulo, which would participate the Rio-São Paulo tournament at the time and would only enter in the second phase. The teams would be divided in two groups of six teams, and the four best teams in each group would qualify for the second phase, with the others going to the relegation group.

==== Group 1 ====
Pos	Team	Pld	W	D	L	GF	GA	GD	Pts	Qualification or relegation
1	Ituano (A)	10	6	1	3	27	15	+12	19	Qualified to Second phase
2	São José (A)	10	6	0	4	18	17	+1	18	Qualified to Second phase
3	Portuguesa (A)	10	4	2	4	19	18	+1	14	Qualified to Second phase
4	União São João (A)	10	4	2	4	14	18	−4	14	Qualified to Second phase
5	Portuguesa Santista (E)	10	4	1	5	18	22	−4	13	Relegation Playoffs
6	Juventus (E)	10	3	0	7	18	24	−6	9	Relegation Playoffs

Updated to match(es) played on 1 March 1998. Source: RSSSF.com
Rules for classification: 1) points; 2) goal difference; 3) number of goals scored.
(A) Advance to a further round; (E) Eliminated

==== Group 2 ====
Pos	Team	Pld	W	D	L	GF	GA	GD	Pts	Qualification or relegation
1	Rio Branco (A)	10	5	2	3	22	16	+6	17	Qualified to Second phase
2	Guarani (A)	10	4	4	2	16	13	+3	16	Qualified to Second phase
3	Mogi Mirim (A)	10	4	2	4	22	16	+6	14	Qualified to Second phase
4	Matonense (A)	10	4	2	4	17	21	−4	14	Qualified to Second phase
5	Inter de Limeira (E)	10	3	4	3	15	16	−1	13	Relegation Playoffs
6	Araçatuba (E)	10	1	4	5	12	21	−9	7	Relegation Playoffs

Updated to match(es) played on 1 March 1998. Source: RSSSF.com
Rules for classification: 1) points; 2) goal difference; 3) number of goals scored.
(A) Advance to a further round; (E) Eliminated

=== Relegation Playoffs ===
Pos	Team	Pld	W	D	L	GF	GA	GD	Pts	Qualification or relegation
1	Inter de Limeira	6	3	2	1	10	8	+2	11	
2	Araçatuba	6	3	1	2	6	3	+3	10	
3	Portuguesa Santista	6	2	2	2	7	8	−1	8	
4	Juventus (R)	6	1	1	4	8	12	−4	4	Relegated

Updated to match(es) played on 1 March 1998. Source: RSSSF.com
Rules for classification: 1) points; 2) goal difference; 3) number of goals scored.
(R) Relegated

=== Second phase ===
In the second phase, the 8 qualified teams were joined by the four participants of the Rio-São Paulo tournament. The 12 teams were divided in two groups of six teams, with each team playing twice against the teams of its own group, with the two best teams in each group qualifying to the Semifinals.

==== Group 3 ====
Pos	Team	Pld	W	D	L	GF	GA	GD	Pts	Qualification or relegation
1	Corinthians (A)	10	5	5	0	18	10	+8	20	Qualified to Semifinals
2	Palmeiras (A)	10	5	4	1	20	17	+3	19	Qualified to Semifinals
3	Guarani (E)	10	5	2	3	19	14	+5	17	
4	Ituano (E)	10	3	3	4	14	14	0	12	
5	Mogi Mirim (E)	10	3	1	6	18	19	−1	10	
6	União São João (E)	10	1	1	8	7	22	−15	4	

Updated to match(es) played on 12 April 1998. Source: RSSSF.com
Rules for classification: 1) points; 2) goal difference; 3) number of goals scored.
(A) Advance to a further round; (E) Eliminated

==== Group 4 ====
Pos	Team	Pld	W	D	L	GF	GA	GD	Pts	Qualification or relegation
1	São Paulo (A)	10	8	1	1	31	10	+21	25	Qualified to Semifinals
2	Portuguesa (A)	10	5	3	2	20	13	+7	18	Qualified to Semifinals
3	Santos (E)	10	4	2	4	23	14	+9	14	
4	Matonense (E)	10	4	1	5	18	21	−3	13	
5	Rio Branco (E)	10	3	2	5	17	30	−13	11	
6	São José (E)	10	0	3	7	10	31	−21	3	

Updated to match(es) played on 12 April 1998. Source: RSSSF.com
Rules for classification: 1) points; 2) goal difference; 3) number of goals scored.
(A) Advance to a further round; (E) Eliminated

=== Semifinals ===
Team 1	Agg.	Team 2	1st leg	2nd leg
Palmeiras	2–5	São Paulo	1-2	1–3
Corinthians	3–3	Portuguesa	1-1	2-2

=== Finals ===
Team 1	Agg.	Team 2	1st leg	2nd leg
Corinthians	3–4	São Paulo	2-1	1–3
