= Gléguer =

Brazilian footballer

Personal information
- Full name: Gléguer Zorzin
- Date of birth: 20 September 1976 (age 50)
- Place of birth: Americana, Brazil
- Height: 1.89 m (6 ft 2 in)
- Position: Goalkeeper

Youth career
- –1996: Guarani

Senior career*
Years	Team	Apps	(Gls)
1996–2000	Guarani		
2001	Corinthians	10	(0)
2001	Guarani		
2002	Cruzeiro		
2003–2005	Portuguesa	99	(0)
2006	Vila Nova		
2007	Náutico		
2007	América-RN		
2007–2008	Bragantino		
2008	Operário-MS		
2008–2009	Vitória		
2010	América-MG		
2011	Bragantino		

Managerial career
- 2013: União Barbarense
- 2014: Santacruzense
- 2014: Portuguesa (goalkeepers coach)
- 2015–2016: Guarani (goalkeepers coach)
- 2017–2018: Siheung Citizen
- * Club domestic league appearances and goals as of 2 October 2023

Gléguer Zorzin (born 20 September 1976), simply known as Gléguer, is a Brazilian former professional footballer and manager who played as a goalkeeper.

== Career ==
Gléguer began his career at Guarani, where he started his youth career in 1987 and turned professional in 1996. He was a starter in the final part of the 1997 Brazilian Championship, saving the team from relegation. In the following years he stood out again, being hired in 2001 by Corinthians. Stayed at the club for a short time, and then did not establish himself as a starter until he arrived at Portuguesa in 2003, a team where he made 99 appearances. On the day he was going to play his 100th game, he ended up involved in a negotiation with Juventude that did not materialize, and he never played for the club again. His last notable campaign was at Bragantino in the second half of 2007, champion of Brasileiro Série C on that year.

== Managerial career ==
As a coach, he managed the União Barbarense and Santacruzense teams, in addition to being a goalkeeper coach for his former clubs (Guarani and Portuguesa). n 2017 he took over Siheung Citizen FC from South Korea, and was K3 League Basic champion with the club in 2018.

== Personal life ==
Gléguer is currently the secretary of sports for the city of Hortolândia.

== Honours ==
=== Player ===
Corinthians

- Campeonato Paulista: 2001

Bragantino

- Campeonato Brasileiro Série C: 2007

Vitória

- Campeonato Baiano: 2009

=== Manager ===
Siheung Citizen

- K3 League Basic: 2018
