= Araras =

Municipality in Brazil

- Municipality
- City of Araras
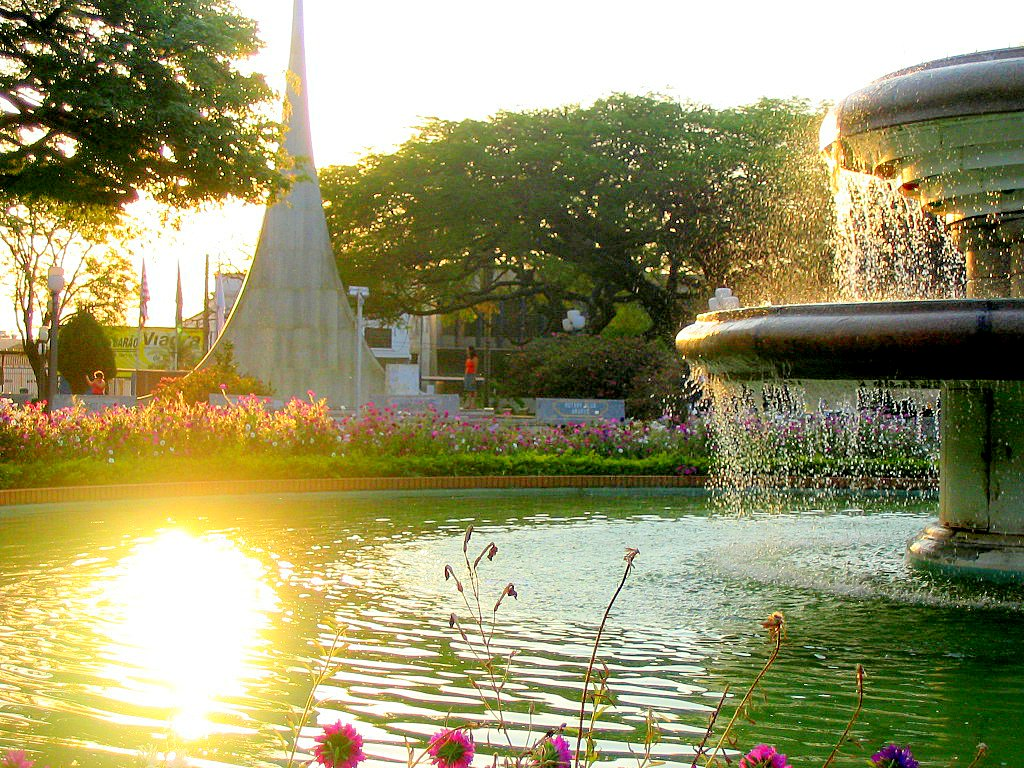
- Fountain in Barão de Araras Square with the 100th Anniversary City Monument at the back

- Flag Coat of arms
- Nickname: Cidade das árvores
- Location of Araras

- Location in Brazil
- Coordinates: 22°21′26″S 47°23′04″W
- Country: Brazil
- Region: Southeast
- State: São Paulo
- Mesoregion: Piracicaba
- Microregion: Limeira
- Founded: August 15, 1862

Government
  - Mayor: Pedro Eliseu Filho (PL)

Area
  - Total: 644.831 km^{2} (248.971 sq mi)
- Elevation: 629 m (2,064 ft)

Population (2022 Census)
  - Total: 130,866
  - Estimate (2025): 135,744
  - Density: 202.946/km^{2} (525.628/sq mi)
- Demonym: Ararense
- Time zone: UTC-3 (Brasilia Official Time)
  - Summer (DST): UTC-2 (Brazilian Daylight Saving Time)
- Postal Code: 13600-000
- Area code: (+55) 19
- Website: www.araras.sp.gov.br

Araras (Portuguese pronunciation: [ɐˈɾaɾɐs]) is a municipality located in the interior of State of São Paulo, Brazil. The population is 130,866 as of the 2022 Census.

== Etymology ==
Araras means macaws.

== History ==
"The city of Araras has its first records in the 18th century, starting on May 19, 1865, when Bento Lacerda Guimarães (Barão de Araras) and José de Lacerda Guimarães (Barão de Ary) considered the founders of Araras, doaram lands For the construction of the Church of Our Lady of Patrocínio, the patron saint of the city, the origin of the name Araras, and as a consequence of the countless Araras that inhabited the Ribeirão das Furnas, was raised to Vila pela on March 24, 1871. Law nº29, initiating the construction of the municipality. Due to the political emancipation of Araras, on March 24th was marked as the date of the city's anniversary."

In 2012 Araras completed 150 years of foundation and 145 years of political-administrative emancipation in relation to the municipality of Limeira. Commemorating the dates, on March 25, 2012, the Orquestra Sinfônica de Ribeirão Preto appeared in the city. The event brought together more than 7 thousand people at Praça Barão de Araras and Largo da Basílica.

== Demographics ==
Historical population (municipality)
Year	Population	%±
1920	25,613
1940	22,614	−11.7%
1950	28,599	26.5%
1960	39,102	36.7%
1970	53,422	36.6%
1980	65,010	21.7%
1991	87,459	34.5%
2000	104,196	19.1%
2010	118,843	14.1%
2022	130,866	10.1%

== Sports ==
União São João Esporte Clube, founded in 1981, is the most successful football club of the city.

== Media ==
In telecommunications, the city was served by Telecomunicações de São Paulo. In July 1998, this company was acquired by Telefónica, which adopted the Vivo brand in 2012. The company is currently an operator of cell phones, fixed lines, internet (fiber optics/4G) and television (satellite and cable).

== Religion ==
Christianity is present in the city as follows:

=== Catholic Church ===
The Catholic church in the municipality is part of the Roman Catholic Diocese of Limeira.

=== Protestant Church ===
The most diverse evangelical beliefs are present in the city, mainly Pentecostal, including the Assemblies of God in Brazil (the largest evangelical church in the country), Christian Congregation in Brazil, among others. These denominations are growing more and more throughout Brazil.

== Notable people ==
- Velloso, football player
- Sorato, football player
- Luisa Baptista, triathlete

== See also ==
- List of municipalities in São Paulo
