= 2006 Campeonato Paulista =

Campeonato Paulista - Série A1
- Season: 2006
- Champions: Santos (16th title)
- Relegated: Guarani; Portuguesa; Portuguesa Santista; Mogi Mirim
- Matches played: 190
- Goals scored: 571 (3.01 per match)
- Top goalscorer: Nilmar (18)

The 2006 Campeonato Paulista de Futebol Profissional da Primeira Divisão - Série A1 was the 105th season of São Paulo's top professional football league. Santos became the champions for the 16th time.

== League table ==
Pos	Team	Pld	W	D	L	GF	GA	GD	Pts
1	Santos (C)	19	14	1	4	33	19	+14	43
2	São Paulo	19	13	3	3	46	21	+25	42
3	Palmeiras	19	11	3	5	37	28	+9	36
4	Noroeste	19	10	4	5	34	26	+8	34
5	São Caetano	19	9	5	5	26	23	+3	32
6	Corinthians	19	9	4	6	43	24	+19	31
7	Rio Branco	19	9	3	7	34	28	+6	30
8	Juventus	19	8	3	8	31	28	+3	27
9	Ituano	19	7	6	6	27	23	+4	27
10	América	19	8	1	10	25	30	−5	25
11	São Bento	19	7	4	8	23	27	−4	25
12	Paulista	19	7	4	8	28	33	−5	25
13	Ponte Preta	19	6	7	6	24	24	0	25
14	Bragantino	19	6	6	7	24	26	−2	24
15	Santo André	19	6	3	10	26	38	−12	21
16	Marília	19	5	5	9	25	34	−9	20
17	Guarani	19	4	7	8	24	31	−7	19
18	Portuguesa	19	5	3	11	21	30	−9	18
19	Portuguesa Santista	19	5	2	12	22	38	−16	17
20	Mogi Mirim	19	2	4	13	18	40	−22	10

(C) Champions

== Top scorers ==
Rank	Name	Club	Goals
1	(Brazil) Nilmar	Corinthians	18
2	(Brazil) Thiago Ribeiro	São Paulo	10
3	(Brazil) Marcos Aurélio	Bragantino	9
3	(Brazil) Fabiano Gadelha	Rio Branco	9
3	(Brazil) Nunes	Rio Branco	9
4	(Brazil) Rafael Moura	Corinthians	8
4	(Brazil) Edmílson	Guarani	8
4	(Brazil) Rodrigo Tiuí	Noreste	8
4	(Brazil) Danilo	São Paulo	8
5	(Brazil) Wellington Paulista	Juventus	7
5	(Brazil) Leandrinho	Noreste	7
6	(Argentina) Tevez	Corinthians	6
6	(Brazil) Edmundo	Palmeiras	6
6	(Brazil) Alex Dias	São Paulo	6

Source: Terra

== See also ==
- Copa Paulista de Futebol
- Campeonato Paulista Série A2
- Campeonato Paulista Série A3
- Campeonato Paulista Segunda Divisão
