= Associação Esportiva Araçatuba =

Brazilian football club

Araçatuba
- Full name: Associação Esportiva Araçatuba
- Nicknames: AEA; Canário da Noroeste
- Founded: December 15, 1972
- Ground: Adhemar de Barros
- Capacity: 18,000
- League: Campeonato Paulista Segunda Divisão
- 2020: Segunda Divisão, 29th
| Home colours | Away colours |

Associação Esportiva Araçatuba, more commonly referred to as Araçatuba, is a Brazilian football club based in Araçatuba, São Paulo. The team compete in Campeonato Paulista A4, the fourth tier of the São Paulo state football league.

== Honours ==
=== Official tournaments ===
State
| Competitions | Titles | Seasons |
|---|---|---|
| Campeonato Paulista Série A2 | 3 | 1973, 1991, 1994 |

=== Runners-up ===
- Campeonato Paulista Série A2 (1): 1977
- Campeonato Paulista Série A3 (1): 2003
