= União São João Esporte Clube =

União São João
- Full name: União São João Esporte Clube
- Nickname: Verdão de Araras
- Founded: 14 January 1981; 45 years ago
- Ground: Dr. Hermínio Ometto
- Capacity: 22,000
- Chairman: José Mario Pavan
- League: Campeonato Paulista Série A3
- 2025: Paulista Série A3, 6th of 16
- Website: http://www.uniaosaojoao.com/
Home colours	Away colours

União São João Esporte Clube, or simply União São João is a Brazilian football club based in Araras, São Paulo. The team competes in Campeonato Paulista Segunda Divisão, the fourth tier of the São Paulo state football league.

== History ==
On January 14, 1981, the club was founded by Hermínio Ometto, who was the owner of Usina São João (meaning Saint John's Mill). The club was founded in the same place of Usina São João, after it closed

In 1987, União São João won the Campeonato Paulista Special Division, beating São José in the final. The club was promoted to the following year's first level.

In 1988, the club won its first national championship. União São João won the Campeonato Brasileiro Série C, beating Esportivo Passense of Minas Gerais in the final. The club was promoted to the following year's second division.

In 1989, União São João disputed the Campeonato Brasileiro Série B for the first time, finishing in the 29th position. In the same year, the club played four friendly matches in Japan. The club won two matches and drew the other two.

The 1993 Campeonato Brasileiro Série A was expanded to 32 clubs, so, União São João was promoted to dispute the competition. The club finished in its all-time best position in that competition, finishing in the 12th position.

In 1994, the club became an enterprise. The club finished in the Campeonato Brasileiro Série A's 21st position.

In 1995, União São João finished in the Campeonato Brasileiro Série A's 24th position, which was the last position, being relegated to the following year's Série B.

In 1996, the club won its second national championship, the Campeonato Brasileiro Série B. In the competition's final four, União São João finished ahead of América de Natal, Náutico and Londrina. The club was promoted to the following year's Série A.

In 1997, União São João disputed the Campeonato Brasileiro Série A again, but finished in the 26th place (which was the competition's last position) and was relegated to the following year's Série B

In 2002, the club was Campeonato Paulista runner-up. The club finished only behind Ituano. The competition was not disputed by the big clubs of São Paulo state.

In 2003, União São João disputed the Campeonato Brasileiro Série B, finishing in the 24th position, which was the competition's last position, being relegated to the following year's Série C.

In 2005, the club was relegated to the second division of the Paulista championship; after spending seven seasons in that division, many times narrowly missing out on promotion back to the first level, it was relegated to the third level in 2012, and in the following year, to the fourth. After failing to return to the third level in 2014, União São João, under financial difficulties, shut down its football department temporarily, making its return to professional football eight years later.

== Honours ==
=== Official tournaments ===
National
Competitions	Titles	Seasons
Campeonato Brasileiro Série B	1	1996
Campeonato Brasileiro Série C	1	1988
State
Competitions	Titles	Seasons
Campeonato Paulista Série A2	1	1987
Campeonato Paulista Série A4	1	2023

=== Runners-up ===
- Campeonato Paulista (1): 2002
- Copa Paulista (1): 2026

== Stadium ==
União São João's home matches are usually played at Estádio Hermínio Ometto, which has a maximum capacity of 21,000 people.

== Anthem ==
The club's official anthem was composed by Flávio Augusto and Carlos Rocha.

== Club colors ==
União São João's colors are white and green.

== Nickname ==
The club is nicknamed Ararinha, meaning macaws.

== Mascot ==
União São João's mascot is a macaw.
