= List of goalkeepers who have scored in the Campeonato Brasileiro Série A =

This list includes all goals scored during the years of competition for the Campeonato Brasileiro, starting in 1974 with a goal scored by Tobias, from Guarani FC. The big highlight in turn is the 65 of the 131 goals scored by Rogério Ceni occurred in the competition. Following is the list with all the 96 goals scored by goalkeepers in Campeonato Brasileiro Série A:

Scores and results list the player's team is listed first.

Campeonato Brasileiro Série A goals scored by goalkeepers
#	Date	Venue	Goalkeeper	For	Against	Score	Result	Type	Opponent goalkeeper	Ref
1	10 February 1974	Arruda, Recife	(Brazil) Tobias	Guarani	Santa Cruz	1–1	1–2	Penalty kick	(Brazil) Detinho	
2	7 November 1976	Mineirão, Belo Horizonte	(Argentina) Miguel Ángel Ortiz	Atlético Mineiro	CRB	4–0	4–1	Penalty kick	(Brazil) César	
3	25 November 1976	Maracanã, Rio de Janeiro	(Argentina) Miguel Ángel Ortiz (2)	Atlético Mineiro	Vasco da Gama	1–0	4–0	Penalty kick	(Brazil) Mauro	
4	15 November 1979	Serra Dourada, Goiânia	(Brazil) Serginho Boneca	Vila Nova	Fluminense	2–1	2–2	Penalty kick	(Brazil) Paulo Goulart	
5	20 November 1996	Parque Antártica, São Paulo	(Brazil) Régis	Paraná	Santos	2–0	3–0	Penalty kick	(Brazil) Edinho	
6	13 September 1997	Morumbi, São Paulo	(Brazil) Rogério Ceni	São Paulo	Botafogo	1–0	2–2	Free kick	(Brazil) Wágner	
7	9 November 1997	Morumbi, São Paulo	(Brazil) Rogério Ceni (2)	São Paulo	Paraná	3–3	4–4	Free kick	(Brazil) Régis	
8	3 November 1999	Morumbi, São Paulo	(Brazil) Rogério Ceni (3)	São Paulo	Ponte Preta	1–0	1–0	Free kick	(Brazil) Alexandre Fávaro	
9	17 September 2000	Morumbi, São Paulo	(Brazil) Rogério Ceni (4)	São Paulo	Portuguesa	2–0	2–0	Penalty kick	(Brazil) Roger	
10	4 October 2000	Morumbi, São Paulo	(Brazil) Rogério Ceni (5)	São Paulo	Grêmio	1–0	1–1	Free kick	(Brazil) Danrlei	
11	17 October 2000	Morumbi, São Paulo	(Brazil) Rogério Ceni (6)	São Paulo	Internacional	1–1	1–1	Free kick	(Brazil) João Gabriel	
12	28 October 2002	Canindé, São Paulo	(Brazil) Rogério Ceni (7)	São Paulo	Portuguesa	1–0	3–1	Free kick	(Brazil) Bosco	
13	20 April 2003	Morumbi, São Paulo	(Brazil) Rogério Ceni (8)	São Paulo	Vasco da Gama	3–0	3–1	Free kick	(Brazil) Fábio	
14	23 July 2003	Mineirão, Belo Horizonte	(Brazil) Eduardo	Atlético Mineiro	Juventude	2–1	2–1	Header	(Brazil) Márcio	
15	3 August 2003	Moisés Lucarelli, Campinas	(Brazil) Lauro	Ponte Preta	Flamengo	1–1	1–1	Header	(Brazil) Júlio César	
16	21 September 2003	Morumbi, São Paulo	(Brazil) Rogério Ceni (9)	São Paulo	Atlético Mineiro	2–1	2–2	Free kick	(Brazil) Velloso	
17	16 May 2004	Morumbi, São Paulo	(Brazil) Rogério Ceni (10)	São Paulo	Paraná	2–1	2–2	Free kick	(Brazil) Flávio	
18	17 July 2004	Morumbi, São Paulo	(Brazil) Rogério Ceni (11)	São Paulo	Figueirense	1–0	2–1	Penalty kick	(Brazil) Édson Bastos	
19	17 July 2004	Morumbi, São Paulo	(Brazil) Rogério Ceni (12)	São Paulo	Figueirense	2–0	2–1	Free kick	(Brazil) Édson Bastos	
20	8 May 2005	Pacaembu, São Paulo	(Brazil) Rogério Ceni (13)	São Paulo	Corinthians	1–0	5–1	Penalty kick	(Brazil) Tiago Campagnaro	
21	28 May 2005	Morumbi, São Paulo	(Brazil) Rogério Ceni (14)	São Paulo	Cruzeiro	1–1	1–1	Penalty kick	(Brazil) Fábio	
22	12 June 2005	Mangueirão, Belém	(Brazil) Rogério Ceni (15)	São Paulo	Paysandu	1–0	2–2	Free kick	(Brazil) Alexandre Fávaro	
23	20 July 2005	Serejão, Taguatinga	(Brazil) Rogério Ceni (16)	São Paulo	Brasiliense	3–1	3–3	Free kick	(Brazil) Eduardo	
24	28 August 2005	Willie Davids, Maringá	(Brazil) Rogério Ceni (17)	São Paulo	Paraná	1–0	4–0	Free kick	(Brazil) Darci	
25	11 September 2005	Couto Pereira, Curitiba	(Brazil) Rogério Ceni (18)	São Paulo	Coritiba	1–0	4–1	Penalty kick	(Brazil) Douglas Leite	
26	18 September 2005	Morumbi, São Paulo	(Brazil) Rogério Ceni (19)	São Paulo	Vasco da Gama	4–2	4–2	Penalty kick	(Brazil) Cássio	
27	21 September 2005	Mineirão, Belo Horizonte	(Brazil) Rogério Ceni (20)	São Paulo	Cruzeiro	3–2	3–2	Penalty kick	(Brazil) Artur	
28	2 November 2005	Morumbi, São Paulo	(Brazil) Rogério Ceni (21)	São Paulo	Atlético Mineiro	2–2	2–2	Free kick	(Brazil) Bruno	
29	4 December 2005	Morumbi, São Paulo	(Brazil) Rogério Ceni (22)	São Paulo	Atlético Paranaense	3–0	3–1	Free kick	(Brazil) Diego	
30	16 April 2006	Morumbi, São Paulo	(Brazil) Rogério Ceni (23)	São Paulo	Flamengo	1–0	1–0	Penalty kick	(Brazil) Diego	
31	29 April 2006	Morumbi, São Paulo	(Brazil) Rogério Ceni (24)	São Paulo	Santa Cruz	4–0	4–0	Free kick	(Brazil) Gilmar	
32	20 August 2006	Mineirão, Belo Horizonte	(Brazil) Rogério Ceni (25)	São Paulo	Cruzeiro	1–2	2–2	Indirect free kick	(Brazil) Fábio	
33	20 August 2006	Mineirão, Belo Horizonte	(Brazil) Rogério Ceni (26)	São Paulo	Cruzeiro	2–2	2–2	Penalty kick	(Brazil) Fábio	
34	24 October 2006	Morumbi, São Paulo	(Brazil) Rogério Ceni (27)	São Paulo	Vasco da Gama	5–1	5–1	Free kick	(Brazil) Roberto	
35	2 November 2006	Morumbi, São Paulo	(Brazil) Rogério Ceni (28)	São Paulo	Ponte Preta	1–1	1–1	Penalty kick	(Brazil) Jean	
36	26 November 2006	Morumbi, São Paulo	(Brazil) Rogério Ceni (29)	São Paulo	Cruzeiro	1–0	2–0	Free kick	(Brazil) Fábio	
37	12 May 2007	Morumbi, São Paulo	(Brazil) Rogério Ceni (30)	São Paulo	Goiás	2–0	2–0	Penalty kick	(Brazil) Harlei	
38	3 June 2007	Durival de Britto, Curitiba	(Brazil) Rogério Ceni (31)	São Paulo	Paraná	1–0	1–0	Penalty kick	(Brazil) Marcos Leandro	
39	3 July 2007	Morumbi, São Paulo	(Brazil) Rogério Ceni (32)	São Paulo	Internacional	1–0	1–0	Penalty kick	(Brazil) Clemer	
40	26 July 2007	Morumbi, São Paulo	(Brazil) Rogério Ceni (33)	São Paulo	Sport Recife	3–1	3–1	Free kick	(Brazil) Cléber	
41	26 August 2007	Morumbi, São Paulo	(Brazil) Rogério Ceni (34)	São Paulo	Náutico	2–0	5–0	Penalty kick	(Brazil) Eduardo	
42	28 October 2007	Ilha do Retiro, Recife	(Brazil) Rogério Ceni (35)	São Paulo	Sport Recife	1–0	2–1	Free kick	(Brazil) Magrão	
43	3 November 2007	Orlando Scarpelli, Florianópolis	(Argentina) Sebastián Saja	Grêmio	Figueirense	1–2	1–2	Penalty kick	(Brazil) Wilson	
44	11 November 2007	Morumbi, São Paulo	(Brazil) Rogério Ceni (36)	São Paulo	Grêmio	1–0	1–0	Penalty kick	(Argentina) Sebastián Saja	
45	20 July 2008	Morumbi, São Paulo	(Brazil) Rogério Ceni (37)	São Paulo	Botafogo	1–0	2–1	Penalty kick	(Uruguay) Juan Castillo	
46	3 August 2008	Morumbi, São Paulo	(Brazil) Rogério Ceni (38)	São Paulo	Vasco da Gama	3–0	4–0	Free kick	(Brazil) Tiago Campagnaro	
47	3 August 2008	Morumbi, São Paulo	(Brazil) Rogério Ceni (39)	São Paulo	Vasco da Gama	4–0	4–0	Penalty kick	(Brazil) Tiago Campagnaro	
48	19 October 2008	Parque Antártica, São Paulo	(Brazil) Rogério Ceni (40)	São Paulo	Palmeiras	1–0	2–2	Penalty kick	(Brazil) Marcos	
49	23 October 2008	Maracanã, Rio de Janeiro	(Brazil) Bruno	Flamengo	Coritiba	5–0	5–0	Penalty kick	(Brazil) Vanderlei	
50	25 October 2009	Vila Belmiro, Santos	(Brazil) Rogério Ceni (41)	São Paulo	Santos	4–3	4–3	Free kick	(Brazil) Rafael Cabral	
51	6 December 2009	Morumbi, São Paulo	(Brazil) Rogério Ceni (42)	São Paulo	Sport Recife	2–0	4–0	Free kick	(Brazil) Magrão	
52	26 May 2010	Maracanã, Rio de Janeiro	(Brazil) Bruno (2)	Flamengo	Fluminense	1–2	1–2	Free kick	(Brazil) Rafael	
53	29 August 2010	Maracanã, Rio de Janeiro	(Brazil) Rogério Ceni (43)	São Paulo	Fluminense	1–1	2–2	Free kick	(Brazil) Fernando Henrique	
54	19 September 2010	Arena do Jacaré, Sete Lagoas	(Colombia) Julián Viáfara	Vitória	Atlético Mineiro	1–0	3–2	Penalty kick	(Brazil) Fábio Costa	
55	29 September 2010	Olímpico, Porto Alegre	(Brazil) Rogério Ceni (44)	São Paulo	Grêmio	1–2	2–4	Penalty kick	(Brazil) Victor	
56	17 October 2010	Serra Dourada, Goiânia	(Brazil) Márcio	Atlético Goianiense	Vasco da Gama	2–0	2–0	Penalty kick	(Brazil) Fernando Prass	
57	17 October 2010	Barradão, Salvador	(Colombia) Julián Viáfara (2)	Vitória	Grêmio Prudente	1–0	2–0	Penalty kick	(Brazil) Giovanni	
58	3 November 2010	Parque do Sabiá, Uberlândia	(Brazil) Rogério Ceni (45)	São Paulo	Cruzeiro	2–0	2–0	Penalty kick	(Brazil) Fábio	
59	21 November 2010	Barradão, Salvador	(Colombia) Julián Viáfara (3)	Vitória	Corinthians	1–1	1–1	Penalty kick	(Brazil) Júlio César	
60	28 November 2010	Serra Dourada, Goiânia	(Brazil) Rogério Ceni (46)	São Paulo	Atlético Goianiense	1–0	1–1	Penalty kick	(Brazil) Márcio	
61	4 August 2011	Morumbi, São Paulo	(Brazil) Rogério Ceni (47)	São Paulo	Bahia	1–0	3–0	Penalty kick	(Brazil) Marcelo Lomba	
62	21 August 2011	Morumbi, São Paulo	(Brazil) Rogério Ceni (48)	São Paulo	Fluminense	1–2	1–2	Penalty kick	(Brazil) Diego Cavalieri	
63	31 August 2011	Serra Dourada, Goiânia	(Brazil) Márcio (2)	Atlético Goianiense	Coritiba	1–0	3–1	Penalty kick	(Brazil) Édson Bastos	
64	3 September 2011	Raulino de Oliveira, Volta Redonda	(Brazil) Márcio (3)	Atlético Goianiense	Fluminense	2–0	2–3	Penalty kick	(Brazil) Diego Cavalieri	
65	4 December 2011	Serra Dourada, Goiânia	(Brazil) Márcio (4)	Atlético Goianiense	América Mineiro	2–0	5–1	Penalty kick	(Brazil) Glaycon	
66	19 July 2012	Serra Dourada, Goiânia	(Brazil) Márcio (5)	Atlético Goianiense	Figueirense	1–1	3–2	Penalty kick	(Brazil) Wilson	
67	25 July 2012	Serra Dourada, Goiânia	(Brazil) Márcio (6)	Atlético Goianiense	São Paulo	2–0	4–3	Penalty kick	(Brazil) Denis	
68	4 August 2012	Serra Dourada, Goiânia	(Brazil) Márcio (7)	Atlético Goianiense	Botafogo	1–2	1–2	Penalty kick	(Brazil) Jefferson	
69	18 August 2012	Morumbi, São Paulo	(Brazil) Rogério Ceni (49)	São Paulo	Ponte Preta	1–0	3–0	Penalty kick	(Brazil) Édson Bastos	
70	10 November 2012	Bezerrão, Gama	(Brazil) Márcio (8)	Atlético Goianiense	Santos	2–1	2–1	Penalty kick	(Brazil) Rafael Cabral	
71	11 November 2012	Olímpico, Porto Alegre	(Brazil) Rogério Ceni (50)	São Paulo	Grêmio	1–0	1–2	Penalty kick	(Brazil) Marcelo Grohe	
72	18 November 2012	Morumbi, Sao Paulo	(Brazil) Rogério Ceni (51)	São Paulo	Náutico	2–1	2–1	Penalty kick	(Brazil) Felipe	
73	14 July 2013	Barradão, Salvador	(Brazil) Rogério Ceni (52)	São Paulo	Vitória	2–2	3–2	Free kick	(Brazil) Wilson	
74	8 August 2013	Mané Garrincha, Brasília	(Brazil) Lauro (2)	Portuguesa	Flamengo	1–1	1–1	Header	(Brazil) Felipe	
75	13 November 2013	Novelli Júnior, Itu	(Brazil) Rogério Ceni (53)	São Paulo	Flamengo	1–0	2–0	Penalty kick	(Brazil) Paulo Victor	
76	21 May 2014	Maracanã, Rio de Janeiro	(Brazil) Rogério Ceni (54)	São Paulo	Fluminense	1–0	2–5	Penalty kick	(Brazil) Felipe	
77	28 May 2014	Parque do Sabiá, Uberlândia	(Brazil) Rogério Ceni (55)	São Paulo	Atlético Paranaense	1–1	2–2	Penalty kick	(Brazil) Weverton	
78	16 July 2014	Arena Fonte Nova, Salvador	(Brazil) Rogério Ceni (56)	São Paulo	Bahia	1–0	2–0	Penalty kick	(Brazil) Douglas Pires	
79	31 August 2014	Orlando Scarpelli, Florianópolis	(Brazil) Rogério Ceni (57)	São Paulo	Bahia	1–1	1–1	Penalty kick	(Brazil) Tiago Volpi	
80	14 September 2014	Morumbi, São Paulo	(Brazil) Rogério Ceni (58)	São Paulo	Cruzeiro	1–0	2–0	Penalty kick	(Brazil) Fábio	
81	24 September 2014	Morumbi, São Paulo	(Brazil) Rogério Ceni (59)	São Paulo	Flamengo	1–0	2–2	Penalty kick	(Brazil) Paulo Victor	
82	4 October 2014	Arena do Grêmio, Porto Alegre	(Brazil) Rogério Ceni (60)	São Paulo	Grêmio	1–0	1–0	Penalty kick	(Brazil) Marcelo Grohe	
83	18 October 2014	Morumbi, São Paulo	(Brazil) Rogério Ceni (61)	São Paulo	Bahia	1–0	2–1	Free kick	(Brazil) Marcelo Lomba	
84	3 June 2015	Morumbi, São Paulo	(Brazil) Rogério Ceni (62)	São Paulo	Santos	3–2	3–2	Penalty kick	(Brazil) Vladimir	
85	6 June 2015	Morumbi, São Paulo	(Brazil) Rogério Ceni (63)	São Paulo	Grêmio	2–0	2–0	Penalty kick	(Brazil) Tiago Machowski	
86	12 August 2015	Orlando Scarpelli, Florianópolis	(Brazil) Rogério Ceni (64)	São Paulo	Grêmio	2–0	2–0	Penalty kick	(Brazil) Alex Muralha	
87	26 August 2015	Castelão, Fortaleza	(Brazil) Rogério Ceni (65)	São Paulo	Ceará	1–0	3–0	Penalty kick	(Brazil) Luís Carlos	
88	4 November 2017	Couto Pereira, Curitiba	(Brazil) Wilson	Coritiba	Avaí	2–0	4–0	Penalty kick	(Brazil) Douglas	
89	28 November 2017	Couto Pereira, Curitiba	(Brazil) Wilson (2)	Coritiba	São Paulo	1–0	1–2	Penalty kick	(Brazil) Sidão	
90	5 September 2018	Castelão, Fortaleza	(Brazil) Everson	Ceará	Corinthians	1–0	2–1	Free kick	(Brazil) Walter	
91	13 September 2020	Estádio de Pituaçu, Salvador	(Brazil) Jean	Atlético Goianiense	Bahia	1–0	1–0	Free kick (rebound)	(Brazil) Douglas	
92	12 December 2020	Castelão, Fortaleza	(Brazil) Jean (2)	Atlético Goianiense	Ceará	1–1	2–1	Penalty kick	(Brazil) Richard	
93	16 December 2020	Antônio Accioly, Goiânia	(Brazil) Jean (3)	Atlético Goianiense	Fluminense	2–0	2–1	Penalty kick	(Brazil) Marcos Felipe	
94	24 January 2021	Antônio Accioly, Goiânia	(Brazil) Jean (4)	Atlético Goianiense	Fortaleza	1–0	2–0	Penalty kick	(Brazil) Felipe Alves	
95	31 January 2021	Couto Pereira, Curitiba	(Brazil) Wilson (3)	Coritiba	Grêmio	1–1	1–1	Penalty kick	(Brazil) Paulo Victor	
96	6 February 2021	Antônio Accioly, Goiânia	(Brazil) Jean (5)	Atlético Goianiense	Santos	1–0	1–1	Penalty kick	(Brazil) João Paulo	
97	31 August 2025	Maracanã, Rio de Janeiro	(Brazil) Tiago Volpi	Grêmio	Flamengo	1–1	1–1	Penalty kick	(Argentina) Agustín Rossi	
98	24 September 2025	Arena do Grêmio, Porto Alegre	(Brazil) Tiago Volpi (2)	Grêmio	Botafogo	1–1	1–1	Penalty kick	(Brazil) Léo Linck	
99	17 May 2026	Cícero de Souza Marques, Bragança Paulista	(Brazil) Tiago Volpi (3)	Red Bull Bragantino	Vitória	1–0	2–0	Penalty kick	(Brazil) Lucas Arcanjo	

== See also ==
- List of goalscoring goalkeepers
- List of goals scored by Rogério Ceni
- List of goalkeepers who have scored in the Premier League
