= 1996 SE Palmeiras season =

Palmeiras soccer season

Palmeiras
1996 season
- President: Mustafá Contursi
- Coach: Wanderley Luxemburgo
- Stadium: Parque Antartica
- Série A: 3rd (eliminated in play-off quarter-finals)
- Campeonato Paulista: Winners
- Copa do Brasil: Runners-up
- Top goalscorer: League: All: Luizão (30)
Home colors	Away colors

The 1996 season is the 82nd season in Palmeiras's existence, and their 82nd in Brazil's first division. The club competed in Campeonato Paulista, Copa do Brasil and Campeonato Brasileiro Série A.

== Summary ==
During January the club reinforced the squad with central back Sandro Blum from Juventude, offensive Midfielder Djalminha from Guarani FC and left-back Júnior from Esporte Clube Vitoria. The team won the Campeonato Paulista playing the best campaign in the professional history of that competition. Managed by Wanderley Luxemburgo and his tactical system known as "Magic Square"(4-2-2-2), the team grabbed 83 points out of 90 possible, and scoring 102 goals in 30 matches.

In Copa do Brasil the squad advanced to semifinals and defeated 1995 Copa Libertadores incumbent champions Gremio. Shockingly, the heavy-favourite club lost the 1996 Copa do Brasil Final against Cruzeiro at Parque Antartica playing without two key players: defensive Midfielder Flavio Conceicao and Forward Müller.

During summer, the club transferred out Rivaldo to Deportivo La Coruña (after the Spanish club paid $7,0 million), Amaral to Parma and Müller to São Paulo following a contract-dispute (loaned from Kashiwa Reysol which owned 50% of the contract that ended on 9 June) losing offensive ground for the upcoming Campeonato Brasileiro and therefore the team is being early eliminated by Gremio in Quarterfinals.

Rivaldo, Cafu, Marcos, Junior, Roque Júnior, and Luizao were called up to have been playing in the Brazil national football team managed by Luiz Felipe Scolari to win the 2002 FIFA World Cup Final.

== Squad ==
Note: Flags indicate national team as defined under FIFA eligibility rules; some limited exceptions apply. Players may hold more than one non-FIFA nationality.

No.	Pos.	Nation	Player
—	GK	BRA	Velloso
—	GK	BRA	Marcelo Moreira
—	GK	BRA	Marcos
—	DF	BRA	Cafu
—	DF	BRA	Cláudio
—	DF	BRA	Cléber
—	DF	BRA	Gustavo
—	DF	BRA	Júnior
—	DF	BRA	Roque Júnior
—	DF	BRA	Sandro Blum
—	DF	BRA	Tonhão
—	DF	BRA	Wagner
—	MF	BRA	Amaral
—	MF	BRA	Auecione
—	MF	BRA	Dênis
—	MF	BRA	Djalminha
—	MF	BRA	Elivélton
—	MF	BRA	Emanuel
—	MF	BRA	Fernando Diniz
—	MF	BRA	Flávio Conceição

No.	Pos.	Nation	Player
—	MF	BRA	Galeano
—	MF	BRA	Leandro Ávila
—	MF	BRA	Marquinhos
—	MF	ITA	Marco Osio
—	MF	BRA	Paulo Isidoro
—	MF	COL	Freddy Rincón
—	MF	BRA	Rivaldo
—	MF	BRA	Rodrigo Taddei
—	MF	BRA	Rogério
—	MF	BRA	Sérgio Soares
—	FW	BRA	Alex Alves
—	FW	BRA	Chris
—	FW	BRA	Leonardo
—	FW	BRA	Luizão
—	FW	BRA	Magrão
—	FW	BRA	Müller
—	FW	BRA	Reinaldo
—	FW	BRA	Vinicius
—	FW	BRA	Viola

=== Transfers ===
In
Pos.	Name	From	Type
MF	Djalminha	Guarani FC	
DF	Junior	Esporte Clube Vitoria	
DF	Claudio	Flamengo	
MF	Elivelton	Corinthians	
MF	Fernando Diniz	Juventus-SP	
MF	Marquinhos	Flamengo	
MF	Rogerio	São João	
MF	Sérgio Soares	Guarani FC	

Out
Pos.	Name	To	Type
FW	Alex Alves	EC Juventude	-

==== Summer ====
In
Pos.	Name	From	Type
MF	Freddy Rincon	Real Madrid	loan
MF	Leandro Ávila	SC Internacional	
FW	Leonardo	Corinthians	
FW	Reinaldo	Parma	
FW	Vinicius	Portuguesa	
FW	Viola	Valencia	

Out
Pos.	Name	To	Type
FW	Rivaldo	Deportivo La Coruña	U$10,0 million
FW	Müller	São Paulo FC	loan ended
MF	Amaral	Parma	
MF	Flavio Conceicao	Deportivo La Coruña	
MF	Marquinhos	EC Juventude	
MF	Marco Osio	Saronno	
FW	Paulo Isidoro	SC Internacional	

== Competitions ==
=== Campeonato Paulista ===
==== First round ====
Pos	Team	Pld	W	D	L	GF	GA	GD	Pts	Qualification or relegation
1	Palmeiras	15	14	1	0	61	8	+53	43	Qualified to finals
2	Portuguesa	15	11	3	1	33	13	+20	36	
3	Mogi Mirim	15	10	2	3	20	13	+7	32	
4	Corinthians	15	8	4	3	37	17	+20	28	
5	São Paulo	15	7	4	4	26	21	+5	25	

Updated to match(es) played on 30 March 1996. Source: RSSSF.com
Rules for classification: 1) points; 2) wins; 3) goal difference; 4) number of goals scored.

===== Matches =====
28 January 1996 1	Palmeiras	6–1	Ferroviária	São Paulo
	Luizao 28'; Luizao 36'; Djalminha 61' (pen.); Djalminha 62'; Müller 82'; Paulo Isidoro 87'		Ricardo Dias 38'	Stadium: Parque Antartica; Attendance: 11 845; Referee: Carlos Simon

1 February 1996 2	Novorizontino	1–7	Palmeiras	Mirassol
	Joel 7'; Carlos Zara (yellow card); Gílson (yellow card); Índio (yellow card); Genilson (yellow card)		Luizão 1'; Müller 24'; Elivélton 28'; Elivelton 43'; Müller 47'; Luizão 86'; Luizão 90'; Cléber (yellow card); Amaral (yellow card)	Stadium: José Maria de Campos Maia; Attendance: 8 264; Referee: José Carlos Marcondes

4 February 1996 3	Palmeiras	3–0	Mogi Mirim	São Paulo
	Sandro Blum 33'; Djalminha 31'; Müller 83'; Cafu (yellow card); Galeano (yellow card); Elivélton (yellow card)		Aílton Cruz (yellow card); Marcelo Batatais (yellow card); Dutra (yellow card); Alex (yellow card); Moreno (yellow card); Ricardo Lima (red card)	Stadium: Parque Antartica; Attendance: 20 315; Referee: Carlos Pimentel

8 February 1996 4	União São João	0–0	Palmeiras	Araras
	Djalminha (yellow card); Elivélton (yellow card)		Luciano Baiano (yellow card); Rogério (yellow card); Didi (yellow card); Fabrício (red card)	Stadium: Hermínio Ometto; Attendance: 10 011; Referee: João Paulo Araújo

11 February 1996 5	Palmeiras	4–1	Juventus	São Paulo
	Rivaldo 43'; Elivélton 46'; Paulo Isidoro 78'; Ósio 85'		Fabiano 5'	Stadium: Parque Antartica; Attendance: 11 721; Referee: Sálvio Spínola Fagundes Filho

14 February 1996 6	São Paulo	0–2	Palmeiras	São José do Rio Preto
	Aílton (yellow card); Pedro Luís (yellow card); Guilherme (yellow card); Valdir (yellow card); Edinho (yellow card); Gilmar (yellow card); Denílson (yellow card)		2' (yellow card) Djalminha; 71' (yellow card) Luizão; (yellow card) Müller; (yellow card) Velloso; (yellow card) Galeano	Stadium: Teixeirão; Attendance: 28 791; Referee: José Mocellin

25 February 1996 7	Palmeiras	3–1	Portuguesa	São Paulo
	Sandro Blum 2'; Luizão 36'; Rivaldo 92'; Velloso (yellow card); Sandro Blum (yellow card); Cléber (yellow card)		27' Caio; (yellow card) Sérgio Soares; (yellow card) Wagner; (yellow card) Ayupe; (yellow card) Tiba; (red card) Augusto.	Stadium: Parque Antartica; Attendance: 25 055; Referee: Oscar Roberto Godói

3 March 1996 8	Corinthians	1–3	Palmeiras	Presidente Prudente
	Edmundo 12'; Henrique (yellow card); Marcelinho Carioca (yellow card); Edmundo (yellow card) 58' (yellow-red card)		1'Djalminha 45; 25'Júnior; 81' (own goal) Célio Silva; (yellow card) Sandro Blum; (yellow card) Rivaldo; (yellow card) Cléber (yellow card); (yellow card) Müller; (yellow card) 53' (yellow-red card) Djalminha	Stadium: Eduardo José Farah; Attendance: 45 972; Referee: (Germany) Markus Merk

6 March 1996 9	Palmeiras	3–1	Guarani	São Paulo
	Müller 15'; Rivaldo 22'; Elivélton 53'; Cafu (yellow card); Galeano (yellow card); Müller (yellow card); Elivélton (yellow card); Luizão (yellow card)		Fabinho 8'; Índio (yellow card); Renato Carioca (yellow card); Fernando (yellow card); Jean (yellow card)	Stadium: Parque Antartica; Attendance: 8 242; Referee: Francisco Dacildo Mourão Albuquerque

9 March 1996 10	Araçatuba	1–2	Palmeiras	Araçatuba
	Gil 11'; Vladimir (yellow card); Márcio (yellow card); Cleomir (yellow card); Dourado (yellow card)		22' Elivélton; 31'; (yellow card) Cléber; (yellow card) Djalminha; (yellow card) Sandro Blum; (yellow card) Elivélton.	Stadium: Adhemar de Barros; Attendance: 11 025; Referee: Léo Feldman

16 March 1996 11	Botafogo	0–8	Palmeiras	Ribeirão Preto
	Jivago (yellow card); Japinha (yellow card); Jajá (yellow card)		12'Luizão; 44'; 47' Djalminha; 52'Luizão; 67'Cláudio; 69' (pen.)Djalminha; 74'Alex Alves; 81'Cafu; (yellow card) Cafu.	Stadium: Santa Cruz; Attendance: 12 765; Referee: Flávio de Carvalho

19 March 1996 12	Palmeiras	4–1	Rio Branco	São Paulo
	Luizão 26'; Luizao 44'; Elivélton 45+1'; Luizão 49'; Amaral (yellow card)		Garcia 66'; (yellow card) Alexandre; (yellow card) Agnaldo.	Stadium: Parque Antartica; Attendance: 12 543; Referee: Oscar Roberto Godói

21 March 1996 13	Palmeiras	6–0	América	São Paulo
	Luizão 12'; Luizao 16'; Djalminha 56' (pen.); Müller 65'; Rivaldo 75'; Rivaldo 79'; Amaral (yellow card); Cafu (yellow card)		(yellow card) Marcelão; (yellow card) Leonardo; (yellow card) Negão; (yellow card) Serginho Fraldinha.	Stadium: Parque Antartica; Attendance: 8 169; Referee: Marcos Fábio Spironelli

24 March 1996 14	Santos	0–6	Palmeiras	Santos
	Baiano (yellow card)		4' Rivaldo; 16' Cléber; 23'Cleber; 58' Cafu; 81' Djalminha; 86' Rivaldo; (yellow card) Cléber; (yellow card) Elivélton; (yellow card) Galeano; (yellow card) Luizão; (yellow card) Djalminha; (yellow card) Sandro	Stadium: Vila Belmiro; Attendance: 14.687; Referee: Dalmo Bozzano

30 March 1996 15	Palmeiras	4–0	XV de Jaú	São Paulo
	Alex Alves 24'; Cláudio 70'; Djalminha 77' (pen.); Chris 84'; Cláudio (yellow card); Djalminha (yellow card); Rivaldo (yellow card)		(yellow card) Wilson Mano; (yellow card) Celinho; (yellow card) Ryuler; (yellow card) Auecione; (yellow card) Amaral (XV).	Stadium: Parque Antartica; Attendance: 9 871; Referee: Alfredo Loebeling

==== Second round ====
Pos	Team	Pld	W	D	L	GF	GA	GD	Pts	Qualification or relegation
1	Palmeiras	15	13	1	1	41	11	+30	40	Qualified to finals
2	Santos	15	10	1	4	45	27	+18	31	
3	São Paulo	15	9	3	3	28	14	+14	30	
4	Botafogo	15	9	2	4	24	21	+3	29	
5	Guarani	15	7	4	4	17	14	+3	25	

Updated to match(es) played on 10 June 1996. Source: RSSSF.com
Rules for classification: 1) points; 2) wins; 3) goal difference; 4) number of goals scored.

===== Matches =====
6 April 1996 16	Ferroviária	1–5	Palmeiras
	Juari 16'		20' Luizão 20; 23' Gustavo; 52'Rivaldo; 80'Rivaldo; 83' Luizão

10 April 1996 17	Palmeiras	4–0	Novorizontino
	Cléber 7'; Cleber 15'; Rivaldo 44'; Müller 58'

13 April 1996 18	Mogi Mirim	1–2	Palmeiras
	Rodrigo 15'		45+1'Júnior; 47' Luizão

18 April 1996 19	Palmeiras	5–0	União São João
	Rivaldo 28'; Cléber 41'; Rivaldo 62'; Müller 64'; Cafu 78'

21 April 1996 20	Juventus	1–5	Palmeiras
	Júnior 7'; Müller 35'; Djalminha 53'; Márcio Griggio 74'; Djalminha 75'; Müller 92'

28 April 1996 21	Palmeiras	3–2	São Paulo
	Rivaldo 11'; Müller 34'; Müller 46'		Almir 40'; Valdir 65'

1 May 1996 22	Portuguesa	1–2	Palmeiras
	Müller 14'; Cléber 72'		Tico 43'

5 May 1996 23	Palmeiras	2–2	Corinthians
	Rivaldo 78'; Rivaldo 20' (pen.)		Edmundo 70'; Marcelinho Carioca 87'

9 May 1996 24	Guarani	1–0	Palmeiras	Campinas
	Silvio 40'; Gutemberg (red card)			Stadium: Brinco de Ouro; Attendance: 14 327; Referee: Sidrack Marinho dos Santos

12 May 1996 25	Palmeiras	3–1	Araçatuba	São Paulo
	Luizão 7'; Müller 50'; Luizão 80'		Alexandre 88'	Stadium: Parque Antartica; Attendance: 21 393; Referee: Oscar Roberto Godói

16 May 1996 26	Rio Branco	1–2	Palmeiras
	Nélson Bertollazzi 3'		Rivaldo 60'; Cláudio 74'

19 May 1996 27	Palmeiras	4–0	Botafogo	São Paulo
	Djalminha 11'; Djalminha 27'; Djalminha 32'; Müller 59'			Stadium: Parque Antártica; Attendance: 21 153; Referee: (Paraguay) Epifânio González

25 May 1996 28	América	0–1	Palmeiras	São José do Rio Preto
			Rivaldo 22'	Stadium: Benedito Teixeira; Attendance: 14 735; Referee: Flávio de Carvalho

2 June 1996 29	Palmeiras	2–0	Santos	São Paulo
	Luizão 6'; Cléber 78'			Stadium: Parque Antártica; Attendance: 27 000; Referee: (Colombia) Oscar Ruiz

9 June 1996 30	XV de Jaú	0–1	Palmeiras	São Paulo
			Galeano 7'	Stadium: Pacaembu; Attendance: 7 662; Referee: Romildo Corrêa

==== Final standings ====
Pos	Team	Pld	W	D	L	GF	GA	GD	Pts	Qualification or relegation
1	Palmeiras	30	27	2	1	102	19	+83	83	Champions
2	São Paulo	30	16	7	7	54	35	+19	55	
3	Portuguesa	30	14	11	5	53	30	+23	53	
4	Corinthians	30	14	10	6	58	31	+27	52	
5	Santos	30	16	3	11	69	54	+15	51	

Updated to match(es) played on 10 June 1996. Source: RSSSF.com
Rules for classification: 1) points; 2) wins; 3) goal difference; 4) number of goals scored.

=== Copa do Brasil ===
==== Round of 32 ====
28 February 1996	Club Sportivo Sergipe	0–8	Palmeiras	Aracaju
	Rogério (red card)		Djalminha 20'; Luizão 22'; Cafu 34'; Djalminha 57'; Luizão 58'; Luizao 63'; Luizao 78'; Rivaldo 85'; Djalminha (yellow card); Galeano (yellow card)	Stadium: Lourival Batista; Attendance: 9 676; Referee: Wilson Souza de Mendonça

==== Eightfinals ====
3 April 1996	Atlético-MG	1–2	Palmeiras	Belo Horizonte
	Leandro Tavares 33'		Luizão 49'; Luizão 61'; Luizão (yellow card); Gustavo (yellow card); Flávio Conceição (yellow card); Amaral (yellow card)	Stadium: Independência; Attendance: 14 187; Referee: Wilson Souza de Mendonça

16 April 1996	Palmeiras	5–0	Atlético-MG	São Paulo
	Rivaldo 28'; Cléber 41'; Rivaldo 62'; Müller 64'; Cafu 33'; Cléber (yellow card); Sandro Blum (yellow card)			Stadium: Parque Antártica; Attendance: 17 284; Referee: Francisco Dacildo Mourão Albuquerque

==== Quarterfinals ====
7 May 1996	Palmeiras	2–0	Paraná (PR)	São Paulo
	Djalminha 49' (pen.); Müller 74'; Cafu (yellow card); Cléber (yellow card); Marquinhos (yellow card) . Flávio Conceição (red card)		Régis (yellow card); Saulo (yellow card); Marcão (yellow card); Carlos Alberto Dias (red card)	Stadium: Parque Antártica; Attendance: 18 428; Referee: Luciano Augusto Teotônio Almeida

14 May 1996	Paraná (PR)	1–3	Palmeiras	Curitiba
	Saulo 91'		Marcão 20' (own goal); Luizão 24'; Djalminha 26'; Wagner (yellow card); Cláudio (yellow card); Cafu (yellow card)	Stadium: Couto Pereira; Attendance: 24 437; Referee: Carlos Elias Pimentel (

==== Semifinals ====
29 May 1996	Palmeiras	3–1	Grêmio	São Paulo
	Rivaldo 35'; Djalminha 45+2'; Müller 79'; Luizão (yellow card); Cléber (yellow card); Djalminha (yellow card); Müller (yellow card)		Paulo Nunes 9'; Dinho (yellow card); Luís Carlos Goiano (yellow card)	Stadium: Parque Antártica; Attendance: 29 747; Referee: Wilson Souza de Mendonça

7 June 1996	Grêmio	2–1	Palmeiras	Porto Alegre
	Jardel 61'; Zé Alcino 78'; João Antônio (yellow card); Rodrigo (yellow card); Paulo Nunes (yellow card); Luciano (yellow card); Arce (yellow card); Adílson (yellow card)		Cláudio 12'; Sandro Blum (red card); Júnior (yellow card); Amaral (yellow card); Cafu (yellow card); Djalminha (yellow card); Velloso (yellow card); Cláudio (yellow card)	Stadium: Olímpico; Attendance: 36 808; Referee: Francisco Dacildo Mourão Albuquerque

==== Finals ====
14 June 1996 1	Cruzeiro	1–1	Palmeiras	Belo Horizonte
	Marcelo Ramos 61'		Cláudio 11'	Stadium: Mineirão; Attendance: 68 763; Referee: Antônio Pereira da Silva

19 June 1996 2	Palmeiras	1–2	Cruzeiro	São Paulo
	Luizão 5'		Roberto Gaúcho 25'; Marcelo Ramos 83'	Stadium: Palestra Itália; Attendance: 29 139; Referee: Sidrack Marinho dos Santos

=== Campeonato Brasileiro ===
==== Matches ====
10 August 1996 1	Bahia	0–0	Palmeiras	Salvador
				Stadium: Fonte Nova; Attendance: 26 987; Referee: Wilson Souza de Mendonça

14 August 1996 2	Palmeiras	0–0	Internacional	São Paulo
	Júnior (yellow card)		(yellow card) Márcio; (yellow card) César Vieira; (yellow card) Arílson	Stadium: Parque Antártica; Attendance: 1 321; Referee: Márcio Rezende de Freitas

17 August 1996 3	Palmeiras	5–0	Coritiba	São Paulo
	Luizão 10'; Djalminha 60'; Rincón 62'; Luizão 68'; Luizão 88'; Djalminha (yellow card); Cafu (yellow card); Leandro Ávila (yellow card); Elivélton (yellow card)		(yellow card) Dinei; (yellow card) Flávio; (yellow card) Cuca; (yellow card) Niltinho; (yellow card) Paulo Sérgio; (yellow card) 55' (yellow-red card) Alberto	Stadium: Parque Antártica; Attendance: 6 040; Referee: Carlos Eugênio Simon

20 August 1996 4	Palmeiras	3–1	Vasco da Gama	São Paulo
	Djalminha 22'; Galeano 69'; Djalminha 72'		Juninho Pernambucano 34' (pen.)	Stadium: Parque Antártica; Attendance: 7 767; Referee: Sidrack Marinho dos Santos

24 August 1996 5	Goiás	0–0	Palmeiras	Goiânia
				Stadium: Serra Dourada; Attendance: 27 526; Referee: Francisco Dacildo Mourão Albuquerque

28 August 1996 6	Palmeiras	4–1	Paraná Clube
				Referee: Antônio Pereira da Silva

1 September 1996 7	Botafogo	0–0	Palmeiras	Campo Grande-MS
				Stadium: Pedro Pedrossian; Referee: Fabiano Gonçalves

5 September 1996 8	Fluminense	1–5	Palmeiras	Londrina
	Pessali 41'		Djalminha 20'; Djalminha 28'; Cafu 31' Freddy Rincon 29'; Djalminha 37'	Stadium: Estádio do Café; Attendance: 22 200; Referee: José Carlos Marcondes

8 September 1996 9	Santos	1–2	Palmeiras	São Paulo
				Stadium: Morumbi; Attendance: 13 332; Referee: João Paulo Araújo

15 September 1996 10	Palmeiras	4–2	Juventude	São Paulo
				Stadium: Parque Antártica; Attendance: 10 452; Referee: Carlos Jaques Rodrigues Magno

22 September 1996 11	Cruzeiro	0–0	Palmeiras	Belo Horizonte
				Stadium: Mineirão; Attendance: 34 651; Referee: Sidrack Marinho dos Santos

29 September 1996 12	Palmeiras	2–1	São Paulo
				Attendance: 8 594; Referee: Léo Feldman

9 October 1996 13	Palmeiras	2–1	Bragantino
				Attendance: 5 082; Referee: Flávio de Carvalho

12 October 1996 14	Atlético Paranaense	2–0	Palmeiras	Curitiba
				Stadium: Baixada; Attendance: 22 500; Referee: Cláudio Vinícius Cerdeira

20 October 1996 15	Palmeiras	4–2	Vitória
				Attendance: 8 677; Referee: Antônio Pereira da Silva

23 October 1996 16	Palmeiras	2–2	Corinthians
				Attendance: 21 440; Referee: Carlos Eugênio Simon

27 October 1996 17	Grêmio	1–1	Palmeiras
				Attendance: 24 721; Referee: Sidrack Marinho dos Santos

3 November 1996 18	Palmeiras	1–0	Flamengo	São Paulo
	Djalminha 16' (pen.)			Stadium: Parque Antártica; Attendance: 13 604; Referee: Francisco Dacildo Mourão Albuquerque

6 November 1996 19	Portuguesa	1–0	Palmeiras	São Paulo
	Roque 9'			Stadium: Morumbi; Attendance: 3 360; Referee: Márcio Rezende de Freitas

9 November 1996 20	Criciúma	2–1	Palmeiras	Criciúma
				Stadium: Heriberto Hülse; Attendance: 8 685; Referee: Carlos Elias Pimentel

17 November 1996 21	Palmeiras	2–0	Atlético Mineiro
	Djalminha 47' (pen.); Leonardo 60'			Attendance: 5 020; Referee: Carlos Eugênio Simon

20 November 1996 22	Guarani	1–0	Palmeiras
	Sangaletti 89'			Attendance: 8 512; Referee: Francisco Dacildo Mourão Albuquerque

24 November 1996 23	Palmeiras	4–1	Sport	São Paulo
	Luizão 9'; Luizão 20'; Djalminha 21'; Elivélton 75'		Marcelo Rocha 10'	Stadium: Parque Antártica; Attendance: 4 526; Referee: Carlos Elias Pimentel

==== Final standings ====
Pos	Team	Pld	W	D	L	GF	GA	GD	Pts	Qualification or relegation
1	Cruzeiro	23	13	5	5	31	17	+14	44	Qualified for next stage
2	Guarani	23	13	4	6	23	14	+9	43	Qualified for next stage
3	Palmeiras	23	12	7	4	42	20	+22	43	Qualified for next stage
4	Atlético Paranaense	23	12	3	8	41	28	+13	39	Qualified for next stage
5	Atlético Mineiro	23	12	3	8	39	32	+7	39	Qualified for next stage

==== Eightfinals ====
28 November 1996 1	Gremio	3–1	Palmeiras	Porto Alegre
				Stadium: Olímpico; Attendance: 38 212; Referee: Sidrack Marinho dos Santos

1 December 1996 2	Palmeiras	1–0 (2–3 agg.)	Gremio	Morumbi
				Stadium: São Paulo; Attendance: 26 503; Referee: Cláudio Vinícius Cerdeira

== Statistics ==
=== Player statistics ===
No.	Pos	Nat	Player	Total		Paulistão		Copa do Brasil		Brasileirão		CONMEBOL		Others	
No.	Pos	Nat	Player	Apps	Goals	Apps	Goals	Apps	Goals	Apps	Goals	Apps	Goals	Apps	Goals
1	GK	(Brazil) BRA	Velloso	38	-47	29	-47	9	0						
2	DF	(Brazil) BRA	Cafu	29	4	22	2	7	2						
4	DF	(Brazil) BRA	Cléber	35	8	28	7	7	1						
13	DF	(Brazil) BRA	Sandro Blum	32	2	24	2	8	0						
6	DF	(Brazil) BRA	Júnior	37	3	28	3	9	0						
8	MF	(Brazil) BRA	Amaral	30	0	22	0	8	0						
5	MF	(Brazil) BRA	Flávio Conceição	22	0	17+1	0	4	0						
10	AM	(Brazil) BRA	Djalminha	32	20	25	15	7	5						
11	AM	(Brazil) BRA	Rivaldo	33	23	24	18	9	5						
7	FW	(Brazil) BRA	Müller	35	18	28	15	7	3						
9	FW	(Brazil) BRA	Luizão	36	30	27	22	9	8						
	GK	(Brazil) BRA	Marcelo Moreira	3	-2	3	-2								
	GK	(Brazil) BRA	Marcos	3	-15	1+2	-15								
	DF	(Brazil) BRA	Cláudio	23	5	9+8	3	4+2	2						
	DF	(Brazil) BRA	Gustavo	15	1	10+2	1	2+1	0						
	DF	(Brazil) BRA	Roque Júnior	22	0	20	0	0+2	0						
	DF	(Brazil) BRA	Tonhão	2	0	0+2	0								
	DF	(Brazil) BRA	Wagner	12	0	3+7	0	0+2	0						
	MF	(Brazil) BRA	Auecione	6	0	6	0								
	MF	(Brazil) BRA	Dênis	1	0	1	0								
	MF	(Brazil) BRA	Elivélton	34	6	12+15	6	2+5	0						
	MF	(Brazil) BRA	Emanuel	4	0	4	0								
	MF	(Brazil) BRA	Fernando Diniz	22	1	22	1								
17	MF	(Brazil) BRA	Galeano	29	1	14+9	1	4+2	0						
	MF	(Brazil) BRA	Leandro Ávila	19	0	19	0								
	MF	(Brazil) BRA	Marquinhos	9	2	1+3	2	2+3	0						
	MF	(Italy) ITA	Marco Osio	16	1	1+13	1	0+2	0						
	MF	(Brazil) BRA	Paulo Isidoro	5	2	0+5	2								
	MF	(Colombia) COL	Freddy Rincón	18	7	18	7								
	MF	(Brazil) BRA	Rodrigo Taddei	1	0	1	0								
	MF	(Brazil) BRA	Rogério	11	0	11	0								
	MF	(Brazil) BRA	Sérgio Soares	6	0	3+2	0	1	0						
	FW	(Brazil) BRA	Alex Alves	4	2	1+3	2								
	FW	(Brazil) BRA	Cris	3	1	0+2	1	0+1	0						
	FW	(Brazil) BRA	Leonardo	21	4	21	4								
	FW	(Brazil) BRA	Magrão	5	0	0+5	0								
	FW	(Brazil) BRA	Reinaldo	5	1	0+2	1	0+3	0						
	FW	(Brazil) BRA	Vinicius	6	0	6	0								
	FW	(Brazil) BRA	Viola	12	6	12	6								

- Source: http://www.futebol80.com.br/links/times/palmeiras/palmeirasfichas/palmeirasft1996.htm
