= Eduardo Allax =

Brazilian footballer and manager (born 1977)

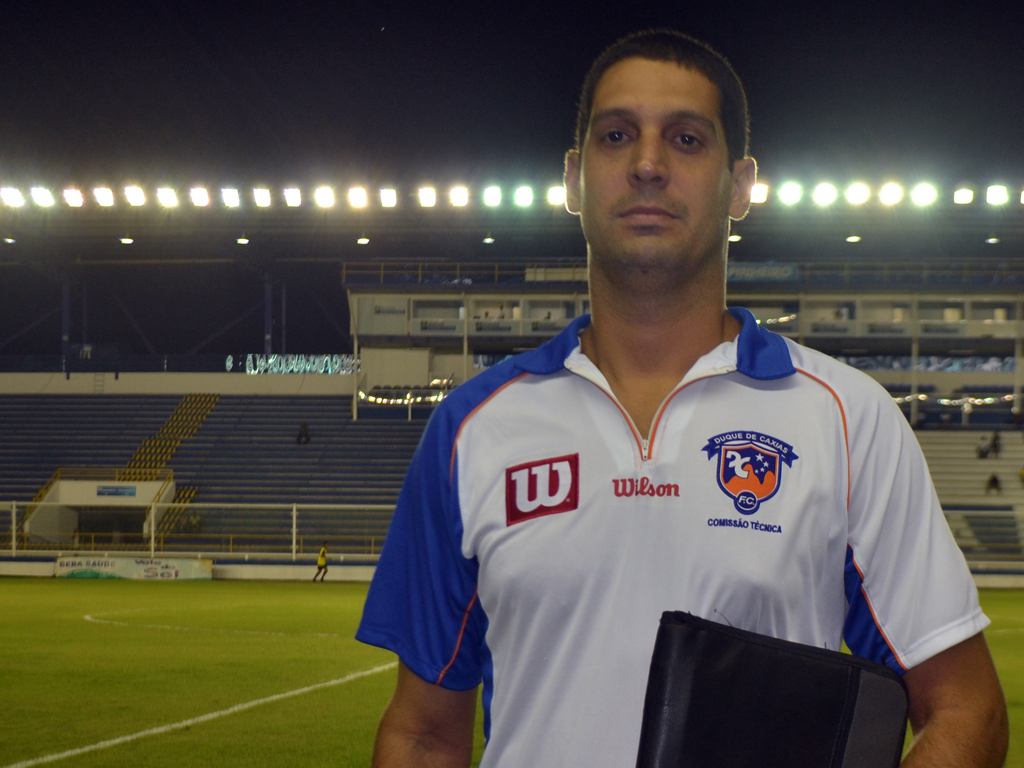

Personal information
- Full name: Eduardo Allax Scherpel
- Date of birth: 2 July 1977 (age 49)
- Place of birth: Rio de Janeiro, Brazil
- Height: 1.94 m (6 ft 4 in)
- Position: Goalkeeper

Senior career*
Years	Team	Apps	(Gls)
1998–1999	Portuguesa-RJ		
1999	Anápolis		
2000	Bangu		
2000	Portuguesa-RJ		
2001–2002	Bangu		
2003–2004	Atlético Mineiro		
2005	Grêmio		
2005	Brasiliense		
2006	Náutico		
2007	America-RJ		
2007–2009	Náutico		
2010	Ceará		
2010	Brasiliense		
2011	Resende		
2011	Figueirense		

Managerial career
- 2012: Duque de Caxias
- 2012–2013: Resende
- 2013: Duque de Caxias
- 2014: Gama
- 2014: Duque de Caxias
- 2015: Nova Iguaçu
- 2017: Bangu
- 2017–2018: Boavista
- 2018–2019: Audax Rio
- 2020: Bangu
- 2021: Macaé
- 2021: Duque de Caxias
- 2022: Zinzane U20
- 2023: Zinzane
- 2023: Gonçalense
- 2024: America-RJ
- * Club domestic league appearances and goals

Eduardo Allax Scherpel, sometimes known as just Eduardo (born 2 July 1977) is a Brazilian professional coach and former player.

Allax played as a goalkeeper and began his career in 1998 with Portuguesa do Rio. He was noted for scoring a header while playing for Bangu over Fluminense, in the final minutes of extra time during the 2002 Campenato Carioca semifinal, however, the goal was controversially invalidated. Eduardo would score again in 2003, this time for Atlético Mineiro. He is one of the most capped goalkeepers for Náutico, playing for the club between 2006 and 2009.

== Club career ==
Eduardo Allax made his senior debut for Portuguesa from Ilha do Governador. After a brief stint at Anápolis in 1998, he moved to Bangu, thanks to his agents and recommended by coach Alfredo Sampaio.

He was one of the top players of the Moça Bonita team during the Torneio Rio–São Paulo and the 2002 Campeonato Carioca. During the semifinals, Bangu and Fluminense were even during the 90 minutes at Maracanã, leading the game to extra time. As a tie would benefit Fluminense, Eduardo went up the field during the final moments of extra time, he would score the game-winning goal after a free kick from Zada. But match official Reinaldo Ribas invalidated the legal goal, claiming a handball foul.

The referee's decision caused many complaints from Bangu players. Eduardo Allax was sent off, there was turmoil and intervention by the military police, and in the end, the Bangu team refused to play the remainder of the match, at the behest of then president, Rubem Lopes. "The referee doesn't even know what his decision was. First he said I scored with my hand, then he went back and scored an attacking foul. There was neither one nor the other. I got knee'd on the back, the ball hit my head and got into the net ", said the goalkeeper, at the time, to a local newspaper.

=== Atlético Mineiro ===
On 15 May, Eduardo Allax signed a five-year deal with Atlético Mineiro, joining the Minas Gerais club at the end of the Campeonato Carioca. He was expected to battle for the second-string spot with Edmar, while starter Velloso was recovering from surgery on his left shoulder. Edmar ultimately was named the starter for the first league match.

Eduardo Allax makes his Galo debut on 25 August, replacing Edmar during half-time of the 4–0 away win against Palmeiras. He went on to make 28 appearances during the 2002 Campeonato Brasileiro Série A.

As Velloso recovers from injury, Eduardo Allax remains at the Belo Horizonte side for the following season as the second-choice keeper, managing six league appearances and keeping a clean sheet against local rivals Cruzeiro in a 0–0 draw. On 23 July, Eduardo scored the game-winning goal as Atlético-MG beat Juventude 2–1. The goal was a header in the final moments of the game, as he went up during a corner kick.

Following another shoulder injury to Velloso, Eduardo took the starting spot for the 2004 season. During the derby against Cruzeiro, in the 2004 Campeonato Mineiro finals, Eduardo got into a brawl with Cruzeiro defender Cris, which got him a 120-day suspension.

In July 2004, Eduardo Allax lost his starting position to new acquisition Danrlei, after struggling to regain form and being criticized by the fans and manager Jair Picerni. He would have another chance as a starter in the 4–0 victory over Paraná, in on 29 July, which would turn out to be his last game for Atlético.

Seeking more playing time in a big club, Eduardo Allax is loaned to Grêmio for the 2005 season, in exchange for right-back George Lucas. Despite being named the first-choice goalkeeper for the year, Eduardo was not accepted by the majority of the fans, who wanted Márcio, the previous year's starter, to take back his place. In May 2005, after only five months, Eduardo resigns from the club due to cricticism from the ultras.

Less than two weeks after leaving Grêmio, Eduardo Allax signs for Brasiliense. He makes his debut on 25 June in a 4–3 away win against Flamengo. Following a string of poor play that culminated with mistakes in two of the three goals suffered in the 2–3 defeat to Corinthians, Eduardo got benched in favour of França on October, staying out of the starting lineup for the next two league games. With the team already relegated, Eduardo was released before the last round of the championship.

=== Náutico ===
In May 2006, Eduardo Allax signed a one-year deal with Náutico. He made his debut in the Série B on 20 May in a 2–1 win over Ceará at Aflitos. Eduardo Allax went on to establish himself as the starter for the remainder of the season, helping the club to achieve promotion and keeping nine clean sheets in 33 matches. He left for America to play in the 2007 Cariocão. On 5 July 2007, Eduardo returned to Náutico to be the starter goalkeeper, as Fabiano was down with an injury.

He was benched in favor of youth academy product Rodolpho for two Brasileirão games. After the youngster conceded four goals in a home defeat to Cruzeiro, Eduardo was named the starter for the following match. On 22 July, he kept a clean sheet on his Náutico return in a 3–0 win away to Corinthians. Eduardo Allax made 15 consecutive appearances for Timbu, before his season was cut short due to a knee surgery.

Eduardo Allax regained his first-team spot for the 2008 season, playing in all but two matches in that year's Brasileirão. He was dropped due to poor form for one match, against Grêmio on 24 August, being replaced by André Sangalli, and was suspended for the fixture against São Paulo after accumulating three yellow cards. He agreed to a deal that would keep him on the Recife side until 2010.

Throughout the 2009 Série A, Eduardo Allax struggled to stay in form, eventually being benched in favor of Glédson after 13 league appearances. Eduardo was relegated to third-choice behind Glédson and André Sangalli. He left Náutico at the end of that season, with one year remaining on his contract, ending his tenure with Timbu after being capped at 152 matches.

=== Brasiliense ===
Ceará manager Paulo César Gusmão signed Eduardo Allax for the 2010 campaign, but the goalkeeper left the club after less than a month, failing to make a single appearance.

On 18 February, he joins Brasiliense once again, serving as second-choice to Guto. On 11 May, he made his debut in the Série B, coming off the bench as Guto suffered a subluxation in his right shoulder during a 1–1 draw against Santo André. He went on to start in 25 matches during the competition but couldn't keep the team from being relegated to the third division.

=== Later career ===
In 2011, Eduardo Allax signs for Resende, appearing in all of the team's 17 matches for the 2011 Campeonato Carioca, in addition to serving as club captain.

On 3 May 2011, Eduardo Allax joined newly promoted Série A side Figueirense as back-up to first choice 'keeper Wilson, signing a one-year contract. However, after just a month at Figueira, Eduardo announces his retirement, after being diagnosed with a heart condition by team doctor Sérgio Parucker.

== Managerial career ==
=== Duque de Caxias ===
After an internship period with the likes of Jorginho, Muricy Ramalho and Abel Braga, Eduardo Allax became assistant coach of Duque de Caxias and, in 2012, after Mário Marques left for Goytacaz, he took the helm of Tricolor da Baixada. On 1 March 2012, Duque de Caxias played their first official match under Eduardo, suffering a 2–1 defeat to Macaé. On 10 March 2012, Eduardo won his first Cariocão game at Duque de Caxias with the 1–0 away win over Nova Iguaçu. Duque de Caxias finished fifth in the 2012 Taça Rio Group B, missing out on qualifying for the semifinals.

=== Resende ===
Later that year, he was appointed manager at his former club Resende, guiding the team to the Copa Rio semifinals. Eduardo Allax also led Resende to the 2013 Taça Rio semifinals before leaving by mutual consent on 6 May 2013.

=== Duque de Caxias (second stint) ===
Eduardo Allax was appointed as Head Coach of Duque de Caxias for the second time on 30 July 2013, following the departure of Mário Marques once again. His first Série C match back in charge was a 3–1 home loss against Grêmio Barueri, on 3 August 2013. He went on to have a seven-game undefeated streak, leading the club out of the relegatin zone. On 3 October, he got sacked by the board following two league losses against Barueri and Betim. Eduardo's tenure at Duque de Caxias ended controversially as the club board argued that player agency BRFoot, which owned the rights of some Duque de Caxias players, offered to pay the team an undisclosed sum of money if Duque de Caxias escaped relegation. The agreement would only be valid, however, if assistant manager Milton Júnior would take Eduardo's place. A little less than a year later, the agency company denied the information.

=== Gama ===
On 25 October 2013, Eduardo Allax joined Gama as manager for the 2014 Campeonato Brasiliense. His first match in charge was a 1–0 home defeat against Luziânia. Eduardo resigns from his post at the end of the competition, as he couldn't take the team to the title, losing to Sobradinho in the quarter-finals.

=== Duque de Caxias (third stint) ===
On 18 April 2014, it was announced that Eduardo Allax would be appointed for a third spell in charge at Duque de Caxias following the departure of Sérgio Farias. However, after failing to earn a single point in his first three Série C games, he resigns from the club on 14 May.

=== Nova Iguaçu ===
On 27 October 2014, Eduardo Allax was appointed first team manager of Nova Iguaçu. He started his Carrossel da Baixada career with a 1–1 away state league draw with Tigres do Brasil. He left the club after six consecutive defeats.

=== Bangu ===
In late 2015, he agreed to manage Profute on their return to professional football. In November 2016 he was announced by Bangu as their new head coach for the 2017 Campeonato Carioca. On 13 February 2017, Allax was fired from Bangu after suffering a 4–0 loss to Fluminense. He led the team in four games, in which the team did not record a single win.

=== Boavista ===
On 22 April 2017, Eduardo Allax was announced as the new Boavista manager for the remainder of the season, with their main goal being the Série D title. In October 2017, the Verdão board announced the renewal with Eduardo for the next season, after winning the Copa Rio, which put the team in next year's Copa do Brasil. Under Allax, Boavista had a great start to the 2018 season, finishing as Taça Guanabara runners-up and securing their place in the Série D for the next season.

== Honours ==
Boavista

- Copa Rio: 2017
