= João Gabriel =

João Gabriel may refer to:

- João Costa (footballer, born 28 March 2005), João Gabriel e Costa Cesco, Brazilian-born Portuguese football forward
- João Gabriel (footballer, born 1977), João Gabriel Moeller Demeneghi, Brazilian football goalkeeper
- João Gabriel (footballer, born 1989), João Gabriel Farinello Rosa, Brazilian football centre-back
- João Gabriel (footballer, born 1996), João Gabriel Ramos de Souza, Brazilian football forward
- João Gabriel (footballer, born 2007), João Gabriel Cardozo Santos Maklouf, football centre-back
- João Fersura (born 2005), João Gabriel Fersura Feu, Brazilian football forward
