= Edmar =

Edmar may refer to:

- Edmar Bernardes, former Brazilian footballer
- Edmar Halovskyi de Lacerda, Brazilian-Ukrainian footballer
- Edmar Japiassú Maia, former Brazilian footballer
- Edmar Lacerda da Silva, Brazilian footballer
- Edmar Victoriano, former Angolan basketball player
- Edmar Mednis, late Latvian-American chess player
- Edmar Castañeda, Colombian harpist
- Edmar Figueira, Brazilian footballer
- Edmar Hermany, Brazilian politician
- Edmar Gomes Rodrigues, former Brazilian footballer
- Edmar Sucuri, Brazilian footballer
- Ed Marszewski, United States businessman
