= Tiago Campagnaro =

Brazilian footballer (born 1983)

Tiago
Personal information
- Full name: Tiago Antônio Campagnaro
- Date of birth: 2 July 1983 (age 43)
- Place of birth: Campo Largo, Paraná, Brazil
- Height: 1.85 m (6 ft 1 in)
- Position: Goalkeeper

Youth career
- 2002: Paraná
- 2003: Matsubara

Senior career*
| Years | Team | Apps | (Gls) |
| 2003–2004 | Juventus | 0 | (0) |
| 2004–2005 | Corinthians | 2 | (0) |
| 2006–2007 | Portuguesa | | |
| 2008–2012 | Vasco da Gama | 22 | (0) |
| 2011 | → Bahia (loan) | 5 | (0) |
| 2012 | → Grêmio Barueri (loan) | 0 | (0) |
| 2013 | Ceará | 0 | (0) |
| 2013 | Avaí | 4 | (0) |
| 2014 | Treze | | |
| 2014–2015 | Ceará | 14 | (0) |
| 2016 | Red Bull Brasil | | |
| 2017 | Batatais | | |
- * Club domestic league appearances and goals as of 04:41, 21 August 2015 (UTC)

Tiago Antônio Campagnaro, better known as Tiago (born 2 July 1983) is a Brazilian former professional footballer who played as a goalkeeper.

== Career ==
Tiago was born in Campo Largo, Paraná.

As of 6 February 2009, he had scored 16 goals in his career.

== Career statistics ==
As of 28 November 2009

| Club performance | | | League | | Cup | | League Cup | | Continental | | Total | |
| Season | Club | League | Apps | Goals | Apps | Goals | Apps | Goals | Apps | Goals | Apps | Goals |
| Brazil | | | League | | Copa do Brasil | | League Cup | | South America | | Total | |
|---|---|---|---|---|---|---|---|---|---|---|---|---|
| 2008 | Vasco da Gama | Série A | 20 | 0 | 9 | 0 | 16 | 2 | 0 | 0 | 45 | 2 |
| 2009 | Vasco da Gama | Série B | 2 | 0 | 4 | 0 | 16 | 2 | — | — | 22 | 2 |
| Total | Brazil | | 22 | 0 | 13 | 0 | 32 | 4 | 0 | 0 | 67 | 4 |
| Career total | | | 22 | 0 | 13 | 0 | 32 | 4 | 0 | 0 | 67 | 4 |

== List of goals scored ==
Following, is the list with the goals scored by Tiago:

| # | Date | Venue | Host team | Result | Away team | Competition | Score | Type | Opponent goalkeeper |
|---|---|---|---|---|---|---|---|---|---|
| 1 | 3 February 2007 | Estádio do Canindé, São Paulo | Portuguesa | 5–1 | XV de Jaú | Campeonato Paulista Série A2 | 5–1 | Free kick | Fabiano Heves |
| 2 | 11 March 2007 | Estádio do Canindé, São Paulo | Portuguesa | 2–2 | Rio Preto | Campeonato Paulista Série A2 | 1–0 | Penalty kick | Pitarelli |
| 3 | 17 March 2007 | Estádio do Canindé, São Paulo | Portuguesa | 5–2 | Nacional | Campeonato Paulista Série A2 | 1–0 | Free kick | Pablo |
| 4 | 5 April 2007 | Estádio Mineirão, Belo Horizonte | Cruzeiro | 2–1 | Portuguesa | Copa do Brasil | 2–1 | Penalty kick | Fábio |
| 5 | 2 June 2007 | Estádio do Canindé, São Paulo | Portuguesa | 1–2 | Ceará | Campeonato Brasileiro Série B | 1–0 | Penalty kick | Adílson |
| 6 | 29 June 2007 | Estádio do Canindé, São Paulo | Portuguesa | 1–1 | Paulista de Jundiaí | Campeonato Brasileiro Série B | 1–1 | Penalty kick | Victor |
| 7 | 7 July 2007 | Estádio do Arruda, Recife | Santa Cruz | 2–2 | Portuguesa | Campeonato Brasileiro Série B | 1–2 | Penalty kick | Eduardo Gottardi |
| 8 | 10 August 2007 | Estádio do Canindé, São Paulo | Portuguesa | 1–1 | Brasiliense | Campeonato Brasileiro Série B | 1–0 | Penalty kick | Guto |
| 9 | 25 August 2007 | Estádio do Canindé, São Paulo | Portuguesa | 1–0 | Fortaleza | Campeonato Brasileiro Série B | 1–0 | Penalty kick | Mateus |
| 10 | 31 August 2007 | Estádio do Canindé, São Paulo | Portuguesa | 2–3 | Ipatinga | Campeonato Brasileiro Série B | 1–1 | Penalty kick | Fred |
| 11 | 7 September 2007 | Estádio do Canindé, São Paulo | Portuguesa | 3–1 | Ituano | Campeonato Brasileiro Série B | 2–0 | Penalty kick | Márcio |
| 12 | 19 October 2007 | Estádio do Canindé, São Paulo | Portuguesa | 1–0 | Remo | Campeonato Brasileiro Série B | 1–0 | Penalty kick | Danrlei |
| 13 | 2 November 2007 | Estádio do Canindé, São Paulo | Portuguesa | 1–0 | Gama | Campeonato Brasileiro Série B | 1–0 | Penalty kick | Renê |
| 14 | 26 January 2008 | Estádio São Januário, Rio de Janeiro | Vasco da Gama | 3–0 | Mesquita | Campeonato Carioca | 3–0 | Penalty kick | Diogo Silva |
| 15 | 16 March 2008 | Estádio São Januário, Rio de Janeiro | Vasco da Gama | 4–1 | Cardoso Moreira | Campeonato Carioca | 3–1 | Penalty kick | Macula |
| 16 | 4 February 2009 | Estádio Raulino de Oliveira, Volta Redonda | Resende | 1–3 | Vasco da Gama | Campeonato Carioca | 1–2 | Penalty kick | Cléber |
| 17 | 6 April 2009 | Estádio São Januário, Rio de Janeiro | Vasco da Gama | 4–0 | Bangu | Campeonato Carioca | 2–0 | Penalty kick | Diogo Silva |
| 18 | 10 February 2010 | Estádio Almeidão, João Pessoa | Sousa | 1–2 | Vasco da Gama | Copa do Brasil | 1–1 | Penalty kick | Ricardo |

== Honours ==
Corinthians

- Brazilian Série A: 2005

Vasco da Gama

- Brazilian Série B: 2009

Ceará

- Copa do Nordeste: 2015
