= Tonhão =

Brazilian footballer (1969–2024)

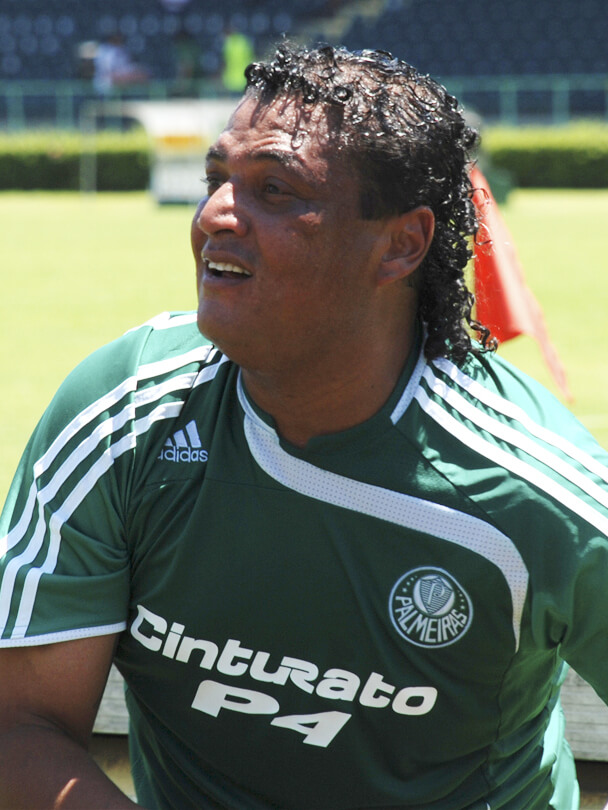
- Tonhão in 2007

Personal information
- Full name: Antônio Carlos da Costa Gonçalves
- Date of birth: 23 February 1969
- Place of birth: São Paulo, Brazil
- Date of death: 22 October 2024 (aged 55)
- Height: 1.78 m (5 ft 10 in)
- Position: Centre-back

Youth career
- –1986: Pequeninos do Jockey
- 1987–1988: Palmeiras

Senior career*
Years	Team	Apps	(Gls)
1988–1996	Palmeiras	161	(4)
1989	→ Araxá (loan)		
1990–1991	→ Nacional-SP (loan)		
1996	→ Atlético Paranaense (loan)		
1996	→ Internacional (loan)		
1997	Inter de Limeira		
1997	Goiás		
1998	Arsenal Tula		
1999	América-SP		
1999	Cerezo Osaka		
2000	Sãocarlense		
2001–2002	Nacional-SP		
2003	Guaratinguetá		
- * Club domestic league appearances and goals

Antônio Carlos da Costa Gonçalves (23 February 1969 – 22 October 2024), simply known as Tonhão, was a Brazilian professional footballer who played as a centre-back.

== Career ==
Revealed in the youth categories of Palmeiras, Tonhão made his professional debut in 1988. He was loaned in the following seasons to Araxá and Nacional-SP, returning in 1992. Tonhão was part of the squad known as "Parmalat era", responsible for the Brazilian titles of 1993 and 1994 and for the team that scored more than 100 goals in the 1996 Campeonato Paulista. He made 161 appearances and scored 4 goals, joining the historic gallery of SE Palmeiras.

After leaving Palmeiras, he had more discreet spells at other clubs, ending his career in 2003 at Guaratinguetá.

== Death ==
Tonhão died on 22 October 2024, at the age of 55. His death was announced on the official websites of SE Palmeiras and the São Paulo Football Federation.

== Honours ==
Palmeiras

- Campeonato Paulista: 1993, 1994, 1996
- Torneio Rio-São Paulo: 1993
- Campeonato Brasileiro: 1993, 1994
