= Márcio Angonese =

Brazilian footballer (born 1974)

Personal information
- Full name: Márcio Rodrigo Angonese
- Date of birth: 6 June 1974 (age 52)
- Place of birth: Caxias do Sul, Brazil
- Position: Goalkeeper

Youth career
- Juventude

Senior career*
Years	Team	Apps	(Gls)
1992–1997	Juventude		
1998–1999	Portuguesa		
1999–2000	Goiás		
2001–2004	Juventude		
2001–2003	→ Figueirense (loan)		
2002–2003	→ 15 de Novembro (loan)		
2004	Marília		
2005–2008	15 de Novembro		
2007	→ Bahia (loan)		
2008	Guarani		
2009	Cascavel CR		
2009	Criciúma		

International career
1993	Brazil U20		
- * Club domestic league appearances and goals as of 1 December 2023

Márcio Rodrigo Angonese (born 6 June 1974), is a Brazilian former professional footballer who played as a goalkeeper.

== Career ==
Revealed at Juventude, Márcio was one of the club's goalkeepers in the 1994 Série B campaign, alongside Marcelo Isoton. He also played for Goiás, Portuguesa and Figueirense, until arriving at 15 de Novembro, a club that was prominent in Brazil during 2003 and 2004. In 2007 he was hired by Guarani, and despite gaining access to Série B at the club, he was extremely criticized for the performances. In 2009 he played for Criciúma, once again facing problems, he was forced to terminate his contract.

After ending his career as a player, Márcio Angonese worked from 2010 to 2022 as a goalkeeper trainer at Juventude.

== Honours ==
Juventude

- Campeonato Brasileiro Série B: 1994
