= Tobias (footballer, born 1949) =

Brazilian footballer (1949–2024)

Personal information
- Full name: José Benedito Tobias
- Date of birth: 13 May 1949
- Place of birth: Agudos, São Paulo, Brazil
- Date of death: 13 July 2024 (aged 75)
- Height: 1.84 m (6 ft 0 in)
- Position: Goalkeeper

Senior career*
| Years | Team | Apps | (Gls) |
| 1967 | Noroeste | | |
| 1968–1974 | Guarani | | (1) |
| 1971 | → Sport Recife (loan) | | |
| 1974–1980 | Corinthians | 125 | (0) |
| 1979 | → Leônico (loan) | | |
| 1980 | Sport Recife | | |
| 1980 | Bangu | | |
| 1981 | Fluminense | | |
| 1981 | Bangu | | |
| 1982–1983 | Rio Negro-AM | | |
| 1983 | Campinense | | |
| 1985 | Paranavaí | | |
| 1985 | Jalesense | | |
- * Club domestic league appearances and goals as of 4 November 2023

José Benedito Tobias (13 May 1949 – 13 July 2024), simply known as Tobias, was a Brazilian professional footballer who played as a goalkeeper. He died on 13 July 2024, at the age of 75.

== Career ==
Tobias was marked in the history of Corinthians for being the starter in the 1977 Campeonato Paulista which the club won. He made a total of 125 appearances for the club.

Tobias scored a goal playing for Guarani, against Santa Cruz in the 1974 Campeonato Brasileiro Série A.

== Honours ==
Corinthians

- Campeonato Paulista: 1977

Rio Negro

- Campeonato Amazonense: 1982

== See also ==
- List of goalscoring goalkeepers
- List of goalkeepers who have scored in the Campeonato Brasileiro Série A
