= Edmar (footballer, born 1981) =

Brazilian footballer

Personal information
- Full name: Edmar Gomes Rodrigues
- Date of birth: 27 March 1981 (age 45)
- Place of birth: João Pinheiro, Brazil
- Height: 1.90 m (6 ft 3 in)
- Position: Goalkeeper

Youth career
- 1996-1999: Atlético-MG

Senior career*
Years	Team	Apps	(Gls)
1999–2004	Atlético-MG	5	(0)
2000	→ Democrata-GV (loan)		
2003	Tupi		
2004	Estoril		
2005	Corinthians-AL		
2006	Bahia		
2007	Gama		
2008	Democrata-SL		
2009	América-MG		
2010	Damash Gilan		
2011	Anapolina		
2012	Poços de Caldas		

International career
2000	Brazil U20	9	(0)
- * Club domestic league appearances and goals

Edmar Gomes Rodrigues (born 27 March 1981 in João Pinheiro), commonly known as Edmar or Edmar Dida is a retired Brazilian professional footballer who played as a goalkeeper.

== Career ==
Edmar began his career at the youth ranks of Atlético Mineiro. He was nicknamed Dida due to his looks, similar to fellow goalkeeper Dida. He was promoted to the senior 1999 squad, and had a brief loan spell at Democrata before returning to Atlético.

On 21 January 2002, Edmar got arrested for cocaine possession. He served as an understudy to Velloso for three seasons before getting his maiden appearance for Galo on 11 August 2002, starting in a 2–1 home loss to Corinthians. He played in four more matches for the club before being replaced during the 25 August match against Palmeiras, leaving the game at half time due to injury.

After being relegated to third-string behind Velloso and Eduardo, Edmar had short spells at Tupi, Estoril and Corinthians Alagoano, before leaving for Bahia in December 2005.

On 2007, Edmar joined Gama. He moved to Democrata de Sete Lagoas for the 2008 Campeonato Mineiro. The following year, he joined América Mineiro as second-fiddle to Flávio.

He went on to play for Anapolina and Iranian club Damash Guilan before moving to Poços de Caldas on 2012.

== International career ==
Edmar was part of the Brazil under-20s team that won the 2001 Hong Kong tournament.

== Honours ==
=== International ===
- Hong Kong International Tournament: 2001
