= Miguel Ángel Ortiz =

Argentine footballer

Personal information
- Full name: Miguel Ángel Ortiz
- Date of birth: 29 September 1947
- Place of birth: Santa Fe, Argentina
- Date of death: 22 July 1995 (aged 47)
- Place of death: Montevideo, Uruguay
- Height: 1.87 m (6 ft 2 in)
- Position: Goalkeeper

Youth career
- Colón

Senior career*
Years	Team	Apps	(Gls)
1966–1970	Colón		
1970–1971	Liverpool-URU		
1972–1975	Montevideo Wanderers		(9)
1976–1977	Atlético Mineiro	100	(7)
1978	Comercial-SP		(1)
1979–1980	Caxias		
- * Club domestic league appearances and goals as of 13 March 2024

Miguel Ángel Ortiz (29 September 1947 – 22 July 1995), was an Argentine professional footballer who played as a goalkeeper.

== Career ==
Formed in Colón's youth categories, Miguel Ángel Ortiz stood out in particular at Montevideo Wanderers and Atlético Mineiro, where he scored goals from penalties. He was the first goalkeeper to score a goal in the Copa Libertadores, on 5 April 1975, for Wanderers against Unión Huaral.

For Atlético Mineiro he made 100 appearances and scored 7 goals, 2 of which came in the Campeonato Brasileiro Série A, against CRB and Vasco da Gama. He was state champion with the club in 1976, but fell out of favor with the fans after an accusation of bribery to hand over a match to rival Cruzeiro in 1977. He ended up being traded to Comercial de Ribeirão Preto in 1978, where he scored another goal in official matches. Ortiz ended his career in 1980 at SER Caxias.

== Honours ==
Atlético Mineiro

- Campeonato Mineiro: 1976

== Death ==
Ortiz died on 22 July 1995 due to cirrhosis of the liver.

== See also ==
- List of goalscoring goalkeepers
- List of goalkeepers who have scored in the Campeonato Brasileiro Série A
