= Rodrigo Viana =

Brazilian footballer (born 1989)

Personal information
- Full name: Rodrigo Viana Conceição
- Date of birth: 14 November 1989 (age 36)
- Place of birth: Niterói, Brazil
- Height: 1.83 m (6 ft 0 in)
- Position: Goalkeeper

Youth career
- 2004–2007: Botafogo

Senior career*
Years	Team	Apps	(Gls)
2008	América-RJ		
2008	Silva Jardim		
2009	Duque de Caxias		
2009–2010	Bonsucesso		
2010–2012	Tupi	38	(0)
2013	Santo André	19	(0)
2014	Bonsucesso	6	(0)
2014	Tupi	20	(0)
2015	Caldense	14	(0)
2015	Sampaio Corrêa	28	(0)
2016–2018	São Bento	68	(0)
2019	Botafogo-SP	8	(0)
2019–2020	Operário Ferroviário	32	(0)
2021–2022	Novorizontino	4	(0)
- * Club domestic league appearances and goals as of 6 March 2022

Rodrigo Viana Conceição (born 14 November 1989) is a Brazilian footballer who plays as a goalkeeper.
