= Julián Viáfara =

Colombian footballer (born 1978)

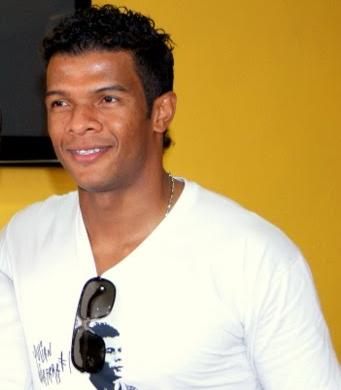

Personal information
- Full name: Julián Ramiro Viáfara Mesa
- Date of birth: May 19, 1978 (age 48)
- Place of birth: Cali, Valle, Colombia
- Height: 1.87 m (6 ft 2 in)
- Position: Goalkeeper

Youth career
- 1989–1996: Boca Juniors de Cali

Senior career*
Years	Team	Apps	(Gls)
1996–2001	Independiente Medellín	83	(0)
2001–2006	América de Cali	123	(1)
2007–2008	Atlético Paranaense	18	(0)
2008	→ Vitória (loan)	33	(6)
2009–2011	Vitória	52	(3)
2011–2012	América de Cali	23	(6)
2012	Patriotas	2	(0)
2013	Deportes Quindío	30	(1)
2015	Vitória da Conquista	12	(0)
Total		376	(17)

International career
2006	Colombia	1	(0)
- * Club domestic league appearances and goals

Julián Ramiro Viáfara Mesa (born May 19, 1978), or Viáfara, is a retired Colombian football goalkeeper.

== Career ==
=== Beginning at Boca Juniors in Tolima and testing ===
As the son of the former player and coach of Colombian U-17 Ramiro Viáfara Quintana, Julián grew up in football. He served in the small school Boca Juniors de Cali, where he began as a forward and also played as a defender.

=== Independiente Medellin ===
He signed a contract with Independiente Medellín and premiered in August, taking a penalty in the match.

Julián Viáfara was considered one of the main promises of the country and won the league's title with his team. In 1999, with the arrival of René Higuita, Viáfara started the year in reserve, but with the dismissal of Colombian idol by disciplinary problems, rejoined the team and played 33 matches that year. However, in 2000 the team signed José María Pazo and he played 16 games.

=== América of Cali ===
He signed with América de Cali and made only 10 matches in 2001. In 2002, he was used even less, playing only four matches at the beginning of the tournament.

In 2004, Viáfara appeared in 29 games. In 2006, he remained as the captain of the team despite the crisis that América was living. However, due to delays of wages and unjust punishments to some players at the end of the year, he left the club.

=== Arrival in Brazil ===
In 2007, he went to Brazil to be hired by Atlético-PR. Colombian David Ferreira played on the team for two years, and enjoying some success at the time, inspired Atlético to sign another three Colombians: Viáfara, Edwin Valencia and Dayro Moreno. Despite having helped the club get into the Copa Sudamericana and playing 19 games, the keeper was withdrawn from the starting lineup the following year, not getting any on the bench in the 2008 Campeonato Paranaense. This situation did not please him, and soon he left the club for Vitória.

=== Idol in Vitória ===
In the second game of the 2008 Brasileirão, against the Sport Recife, Viáfara made a memorable debut. Due to their good performances in the previous season, the Vitória chose to buy the pass of the player in 2009. Vitória won the 2009 Campeonato Baiano, with Viáfara involved in an altercation with Bahia's goalkeeper, Marcelo, after Ramon Menezes scored a last-minute penalty for Vitória in the second leg of the final.

== Personal life ==
Julian Viáfara has three daughters, Valerie, Lua and Mariangel. Since its arrival in Salvador, he has been involved in social projects and campaigns to assist underprivileged individuals. For this and other work, he was awarded the title of Citizen of Bahia in late 2010.

== Honours ==
- América de Cali
  - Copa Mustang: 2001, 2002
- Vitória
  - Campeonato Baiano: 2009, 2010

== Statistics ==
As of 7 February 2016

Club	Year	State League		Cup		National League		South-America		Others		Total	
Club	Year	Apps	Goals	Apps	Goals	Apps	Goals	Apps	Goals	Apps	Goals	Apps	Goals
Independiente Medellín
Independiente Medellín	1997	–	–	0	0	10	0	0	0	0	0	10	0
Independiente Medellín	1998	–	–	0	0	24	0	0	0	0	0	24	0
Independiente Medellín	1999	–	–	0	0	33	0	0	0	0	0	33	0
Independiente Medellín	2000	–	–	0	0	16	0	0	0	0	0	16	0
Independiente Medellín	Total	0	0	0	0	83	0	0	0	0	0	83	0
América de Cali
América de Cali	2001	–	–	0	0	10	0	3	0	0	0	13	0
América de Cali	2002	–	–	0	0	5	0	0	0	0	0	5	0
América de Cali	2003	–	–	0	0	9	0	3	0	0	0	12	0
América de Cali	2004	–	–	0	0	30	0	0	0	0	0	30	0
América de Cali	2005	–	–	0	0	39	1	8	0	0	0	47	1
América de Cali	2006	–	–	0	0	30	0	0	0	0	0	30	0
América de Cali	Total	0	0	0	0	123	1	14	0	0	0	137	1
Atlético/PR
Atlético/PR	2007	0	0	1	0	18	0	2	0	0	0	21	0
Atlético/PR	Total	0	0	1	0	18	0	2	0	0	0	21	0
Vitória
Vitória	2008	0	0	0	0	33	0	0	0	0	0	33	0
Vitória	2009	22	0	8	0	28	0	1	0	0	0	59	0
Vitória	2010	21	1	11	3	25	3	1	0	2	0	60	7
Vitória	2011	15	1	2	1	0	0	0	0	0	0	17	2
Vitória	Total	59	2	21	4	85	3	2	0	2	0	169	9
América de Cali
América de Cali	2011	–	–	–	–	16	0	0	0	0	0	16	0
América de Cali	2012	–	–	2	0	7	0	0	0	0	0	9	0
América de Cali	Total	0	0	2	0	23	0	0	0	0	0	25	0
Patriotas Boyacá
Patriotas Boyacá	2012	–	–	–	–	2	0	0	0	0	0	2	0
Patriotas Boyacá	Total	0	0	0	0	2	0	0	0	0	0	2	0
Deportes Quindío
Deportes Quindío	2013	–	–	2	0	30	1	0	0	0	0	32	1
Deportes Quindío	Total	0	0	2	0	30	1	0	0	0	0	32	1
Vitória da Conquista
Vitória da Conquista	2015	0	0	1	0	12	0	0	0	0	0	13	0
Vitória da Conquista	Total	0	0	1	0	12	0	0	0	0	0	13	0
Total		59	2	27	4	376	5	18	0	2	0	482	11
