= Serginho Boneca =

Brazilian footballer (born 1957)

Personal information
- Full name: Sérgio Roberto da Silva
- Date of birth: 29 June 1957 (age 69)
- Place of birth: São Paulo, Brazil
- Position: Goalkeeper

Youth career
- 1971–1977: São Paulo

Senior career*
Years	Team	Apps	(Gls)
1977	Rio Verde		
1977	Botafogo-PB		
1978–1980	Vila Nova		
1981–1984	Inter de Limeira		
1985–1988	Portuguesa		
1987	→ Sertãozinho (loan)		
1989	Goiás		
1990	São Bento		
1990	Araçatuba		
1991	Portuguesa Santista		
1991	São Caetano		

Managerial career
- 2009–2011: Audax
- 2014: Juventus
- 2015: Portuguesa Santista
- * Club domestic league appearances and goals

Sérgio Roberto da Silva (born 29 June 1957), better known as Serginho Boneca, Sérgio Silva or simply Serginho, is a Brazilian former professional football player and manager who played as a goalkeeper.

== Career ==
Serginho started in the youth sector at São Paulo FC but never played for the club, signing his first professional contract with Rio Verde EC of Goiás. At Vila Nova, he managed to become four consecutive state champions. Then he had a remarkable stint at Portuguesa, and ended his career as part of the third division title with São Caetano, the first of history of the club.

On 15 November 1979, Serginho scored a goal against Fluminense, in a match valid for the Campeonato Brasileiro.

Also had a short career as a coach, passing through Audax, Juventus and Portuguesa Santista.

== Personal life ==
Gained the nickname Serginho "Boneca" (English: Doll) due to the fact that his father is the owner of a toy factory.

== Honours ==
Vila Nova

- Campeonato Goiano: 1978, 1979, 1980

São Caetano

- Campeonato Paulista Série A3: 1991
