= Marcos Leandro =

Brazilian footballer

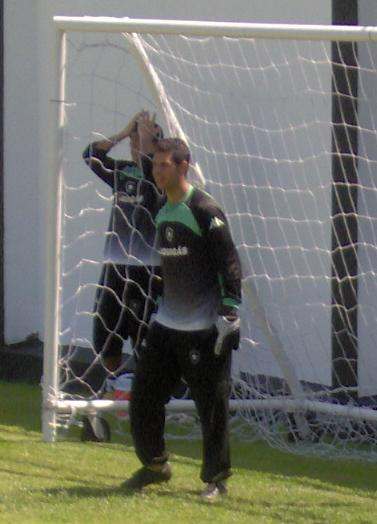
- Marcos Leandro training with Botafogo

Personal information
- Full name: Marcos Leandro Pereira
- Date of birth: April 3, 1982 (age 44)
- Place of birth: Rio de Janeiro, Brazil
- Height: 1.89 m (6 ft 2 in)
- Position: Goalkeeper

Team information
- Current team: America-RJ
- Number: 1

Youth career
- 2000: Olaria

Senior career*
Years	Team	Apps	(Gls)
2001	Bangu		
2001	Tombense-MG		
2001–2003	Olaria		
2003	Rio Claro (Loan)		
2004	Fluminense (Loan)		
2005	Olaria		
2005	Nova Iguaçu (Loan)		
2005–2007	Paraná		
2007–2008	Botafogo (Loan)		
2008	Bonsucesso (loan)		
2009	Clube Atlético Tubarão		
2009	Mineiros Esporte Clube		
2009–2010	Portuguesa (RJ)		
2010	→ Bangu (loan)		
2011–	America-RJ	1	(0)
- * Club domestic league appearances and goals

Marcos Leandro Pereira (born April 3, 1982) is a Brazilian professional footballer who plays as a goalkeeper for America-RJ.
