= Marcelo Isoton =

Brazilian footballer

Isoton
Personal information
- Full name: Marcelo Conte Isoton
- Date of birth: 11 November 1971 (age 54)
- Place of birth: Porto Alegre, Brazil
- Position: Goalkeeper

Youth career
- Juventude

Senior career*
Years	Team	Apps	(Gls)
1991–1995	Juventude		
1996	Criciúma		
1997	Guarany de Garibaldi		
1997	Passo Fundo		
1998	Apucarana		
- * Club domestic league appearances and goals as of 29 November 2023

Marcelo Conte Isoton (born 11 November 1971), better known as Isoton, is a Brazilian former professional footballer who played as a goalkeeper.

== Career ==
Revealed in Juventude's youth categories, he gained his position during the 1994 Series B dispute, where the club became champion. He also had spells at Criciúma, Guarany de Garibaldi, Passo Fundo and Apucarana.

== Honours ==
Juventude

- Campeonato Brasileiro Série B: 1994
