= Paulo Isidoro (footballer, born 1973) =

Brazilian footballer

Personal information
- Full name: Alex Sandro Santana de Oliveira
- Date of birth: 30 October 1973 (age 53)
- Place of birth: Salvador, Bahia, Brazil
- Height: 1.73 m (5 ft 8 in)
- Position: Striker

Senior career*
Years	Team	Apps	(Gls)
1993–1994	Vitória		
1994–1996	Palmeiras		
1996–1997	Internacional		
1997–1998	Guarani		
1999–2000	Cruzeiro		
2000	Kawasaki Frontale	9	(2)
2001	Vitória		
2001	Cruzeiro		
2002	Fluminense		
2002	Malatya		
2003	Brasiliense		
2004	Portuguesa		
2005	Santo André		
2005	Fortaleza		
2006	Juventus-SP		
2007	América-RN	20	(3)
2008	Fortaleza	17	(8)
2009	Bahia	16	(5)
2010	Fortaleza	8	(0)
2011	Mogi Mirim		
- * Club domestic league appearances and goals

Alex Sandro Santana de Oliveira (born 30 October 1973), known as Paulo Isidoro, is a Brazilian former football player.

== Club statistics ==
Club performance			League		Cup		League Cup		Total	
Season	Club	League	Apps	Goals	Apps	Goals	Apps	Goals	Apps	Goals
Japan			League		Emperor's Cup		J.League Cup		Total	
2000	Kawasaki Frontale	J1 League	9	2	0	0	4	1	13	3
Total			9	2	0	0	4	1	13	3
