= Wilson (footballer, born 1984) =

Brazilian footballer

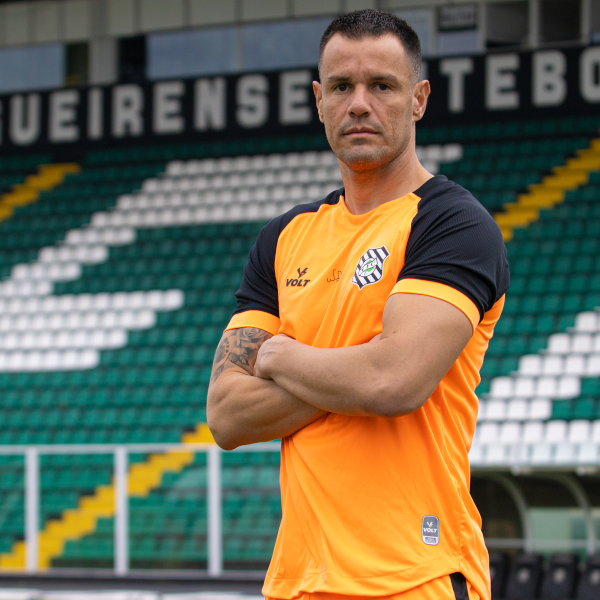

Personal information
- Full name: Wilson Rodrigues de Moura Júnior
- Date of birth: 31 January 1984 (age 42)
- Place of birth: Santo André, Brazil
- Height: 1.85 m (6 ft 1 in)
- Position: Goalkeeper

Youth career
- 1995–2004: Flamengo

Senior career*
Years	Team	Apps	(Gls)
2005–2008	Flamengo	0	(0)
2006	→ Portuguesa-RJ (loan)	7	(0)
2006	Olaria	8	(0)
2007–2008	→ Figueirense (loan)	104	(0)
2009–2012	Figueirense	207	(3)
2013–2015	Vitória	76	(0)
2015–2022	Coritiba	276	(10)
2019	→ Atlético Mineiro (loan)	3	(0)
2022–2024	Figueirense	42	(5)
Total		723	(18)
- * Club domestic league appearances and goals as of 13 August 2023

Wilson Rodrigues de Moura Júnior (born January 31, 1984), known simply as Wilson, is a Brazilian former footballer who played as a goalkeeper. He retired in March 2024.

== Career ==
=== Early years ===
After almost ten years in Flamengo's junior team, he began professional in 2005. Has short period in Portuguesa and Olaria, both in Rio de Janeiro, and came at Figueirense in 2007.

=== Figueirense ===
Wilson made his debut for Figueirense in a 3–0 win over Avaí. He scored three goals during his time with the club. According to the cited source, he remained with Figueirense through different periods and was part of the squad that returned to the top division in 2011.

After a law problem with the club due three month of salary delay, Wilson canceled his contract with Figueirense in February 2013, his statistic are: 300 matches in club.

=== Vitória ===
On 25 February 2013, Wilson was announced as new goalkeeper of Vitória. Initially, he was hired to be in second team, Wilson debut in draw against Salgueiro.

Wilson's first opportunity with Vitória came on 18 May, one day before the Campeonato Baiano final against Bahia, when first-choice goalkeeper Deola was injured in training.

In Campeonato Brasileiro, Wilson was beyond. The goalkeeper was one of the main players of Vitória and championship.

=== Coritiba ===
On 18 June 2015, Wilson was hired by Coritiba. He worked with them for many years, and in April 2021 he completed 250 games for Coritiba. He is considered an idol by Cirin the recent years by many Coritiba fans.

== Honours ==
Figueirense

- Campeonato Catarinense: 2008

Vitória

- Campeonato Baiano: 2013

== List of goals scored ==
Following, is the list with the goals scored by Wilson:

#	Date	Venue	Host team	Result	Away team	Competition	Score	Type	Opponent goalkeeper
1	17 July 2009	Estádio Orlando Scarpelli, Florianópolis	Figueirense	3–1	Vila Nova	Campeonato Brasileiro Série B	3–1	Penalty kick	Max
2	31 July 2009	Estádio Amigão, Campina Grande	Campinense	4–2	Figueirense	Campeonato Brasileiro Série B	4–2	Penalty kick	Emerson Fabiano
3	27 March 2010	Estádio Orlando Scarpelli, Florianópolis	Figueirense	5–0	Juventus	Campeonato Catarinense	5–0	Free kick	André
4	25 February 2016	Estádio Couto Pereira, Curitiba	Coritiba	3–3	Rio Branco	Campeonato Paranaense	3–3	Header	Edvaldo
5	4 November 2017	Estádio Couto Pereira, Curitiba	Coritiba	4–0	Avaí	Campeonato Brasileiro	2–0	Penalty kick	Douglas
6	26 November 2017	Estádio Couto Pereira, Curitiba	Coritiba	1–2	São Paulo	Campeonato Brasileiro	1–0	Penalty kick	Sidão
7	14 March 2018	Estádio Couto Pereira, Curitiba	Coritiba	1–1	Goiás	Copa do Brasil	1–1	Penalty kick	Marcelo Rangel
8	29 May 2018	Estádio do Café, Londrina	Londrina	3–2	Coritiba	Campeonato Brasileiro Série B	2–2	Penalty kick	Vagner
9	21 July 2018	Estádio Couto Pereira, Curitiba	Coritiba	2–2	São Bento	Campeonato Brasileiro Série B	2–0	Penalty kick	Rodrigo Viana
10	21 August 2018	Estádio Heriberto Hülse, Criciúma	Criciúma	2–2	Coritiba	Campeonato Brasileiro Série B	2–2	Penalty kick	Júnior Belliato
11	5 October 2018	Estádio Couto Pereira, Curitiba	Coritiba	2–1	Juventude	Campeonato Brasileiro Série B	2–1	Penalty kick	Douglas Silva
12	20 January 2019	Estádio do ABC, Foz do Iguaçu	Foz do Iguaçu	0–4	Coritiba	Campeonato Paranaense	0–3	Penalty kick	Fellipe Alisson
13	11 June 2019	Estádio Brinco de Ouro, Campinas	Guarani	0–1	Coritiba	Campeonato Brasileiro Série B	0–1	Penalty kick	Giovanni
14	31 January 2021	Estádio Couto Pereira, Curitiba	Coritiba	1–1	Grêmio	Campeonato Brasileiro	1–1	Penalty kick	Paulo Victor
15	19 April 2022	Estádio Orlando Scarpelli, Florianópolis	Figueirense	4–1	Altos	Campeonato Brasileiro Série C	4–0	Penalty kick	Marcelo Barbosa
16	21 May 2022	Estádio Bento Freitas, Pelotas	Brasil de Pelotas	0–1	Figueirense	Campeonato Brasileiro Série C	0–1	Penalty kick	Vitor Luiz
17	4 June 2022	Estádio Colosso da Lagoa, Erechim	Ypiranga	3–3	Figueirense	Campeonato Brasileiro Série C	1–2	Penalty kick	Edson
18	20 August 2022	Estádio Frasqueirão, Natal	ABC	2–1	Figueirense	Campeonato Brasileiro Série C	2–1	Penalty kick	Matheus Nogueira
19	28 August 2022	Estádio Orlando Scarpelli, Florianópolis	Figueirense	5–1	Vitória	Campeonato Brasileiro Série C	3–1	Penalty kick	Dalton
