= Édson Bastos =

Brazilian footballer (born 1979)

Personal information
- Full name: Édson Bastos Barreto
- Date of birth: 3 November 1979 (age 46)
- Place of birth: Foz do Iguaçu, Paraná, Brazil
- Height: 1.87 m (6 ft 2 in)
- Position: Goalkeeper

Team information
- Current team: Ponte Preta

Senior career*
Years	Team	Apps	(Gls)
1998	Figueirense		
1999	Biguaçu		
2000–2001	Figueirense		
2001	Tiradentes		
2002–2005	Figueirense	140	(0)
2005	Portuguesa		
2006	Fortaleza	13	(0)
2006–2007	Guaratinguetá		
2007–2008	→ Coritiba (loan)	14	(0)
2009–2012	Coritiba	87	(0)
2012	→ Ponte Preta (loan)	30	(0)
2013	Ponte Preta	26	(0)
2015	Foz do Iguaçu	15	(0)
- * Club domestic league appearances and goals

Édson Bastos Barreto or simply Édson Bastos (born 3 November 1979), is a Brazilian former football goalkeeper.

== Honours ==
Figueirense

- Santa Catarina State Championship: 2002, 2003, 2004

Coritiba

- Brazilian Série B: 2007, 2010
- Paraná State Championship: 2008, 2010, 2011, 2012
