= Márcio (footballer, born January 1981) =

Brazilian footballer

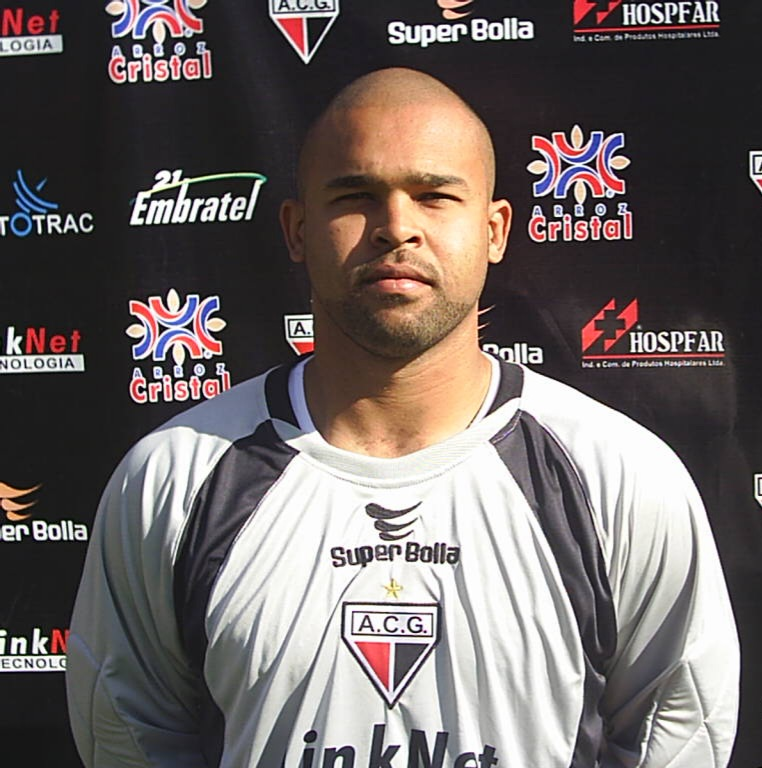
- Márcio with Atlético Goianiense

Personal information
- Full name: Márcio Luiz Silva Lopes Santos Souza
- Date of birth: January 24, 1981 (age 45)
- Place of birth: Aracaju, Brazil
- Height: 1.84 m (6 ft 0 in)
- Position: Goalkeeper

Youth career
- 1998–2001: Bahia

Senior career*
Years	Team	Apps	(Gls)
2002–2005	Bahia	17	(0)
2006	Fortaleza	2	(0)
2007–2016	Atlético Goianiense	393	(28)
2016–2017	Goiás	13	(1)
2018	Ipatinga	6	(0)
2018–2019	Goiânia	11	(1)
- * Club domestic league appearances and goals

Márcio Luiz Silva Lopes Santos Souza or simply Márcio (born January 24, 1981), is a Brazilian former professional footballer who played as a goalkeeper.

== Honours ==
Bahia

- Bahia State League: 2002
- Northeast Cup: 2002

Atlético Goianiense

- Goiás State League: 2007, 2010
- Brazilian Série C: 2008

== See also ==
- List of goalscoring goalkeepers
