= João Gabriel (footballer, born 1977) =

Brazilian footballer

Personal information
- Full name: João Gabriel Moeller Demeneghi
- Date of birth: 5 November 1977 (age 48)
- Place of birth: Porto Alegre, Brazil
- Position: Goalkeeper

Youth career
- 1989–1998: Internacional

Senior career*
Years	Team	Apps	(Gls)
1998–2004	Internacional		
2005	Mogi Mirim		

International career
1997	Brazil U20		
- * Club domestic league appearances and goals as of 2 October 2023

João Gabriel Moeller Demeneghi (born 5 November 1977), simply known as João Gabriel, is a Brazilian professional footballer who played as a goalkeeper.

== Career ==
For a decade in Internacional's youth divisions, João Gabriel was champion of the Copa SP in 1998 and a starter in the 1999 and 2000 seasons, after incumbent André Doring was sold to Cruzeiro. With the arrival of Clemer, became the reserve, and with the arrival of coach Celso Roth, he ended up no longer playing. In 2005, João Gabriel competed in the Campeonato Paulista for Mogi Mirim, and at the end of the competition, he retired from football at the age of 26.

== Post career ==
While still a goalkeeper for Internacional, he started law school, working as a lawyer after retiring.

== Honours ==
Internacional

- Copa São Paulo de Futebol Jr.: 1998
- Campeonato Gaúcho: 2002, 2003
