= Guto (footballer, born 1976) =

Brazilian footballer

Personal information
- Full name: Adelton Gomes da Silva
- Date of birth: 27 January 1976 (age 50)
- Place of birth: São Borja, Brazil
- Height: 1.88 m (6 ft 2 in)
- Position: Goalkeeper

Team information
- Current team: Brasiliense

Senior career*
Years	Team	Apps	(Gls)
2006	Santa Cruz		
2007–	Brasiliense		
- * Club domestic league appearances and goals

Adelton Gomes da Silva (born 27 January 1976), better known as Guto, is a Brazilian footballer who plays as a goalkeeper for Brasiliense.

== Career ==
Guto has played for Santa Cruz Futebol Clube in the Campeonato Brasileiro and Copa do Brasil.
