= 1996 Campeonato Paulista =

Campeonato Paulista - Série A1
- Season: 1996
- Champions: Palmeiras
- Relegated: Ferroviária; Novorizontino; XV de Jaú
- Matches: 240
- Goals: 734 (3.06 per match)
- Top goalscorer: Giovanni (Santos) - 24 goals
- Biggest home win: Palmeiras 6–0 América (March 21, 1996); Mogi Mirim 6–0 XV de Jaú (May 1, 1996)
- Biggest away win: Botafogo 0–8 Palmeiras (March 16, 1996)
- Highest scoring: União São João 2–8 Santos (April 6, 1996)

The 1996 Campeonato Paulista de Futebol Profissional da Primeira Divisão - Série A1 was the 95th season of São Paulo's top professional football league. Palmeiras won the championship for the 21st time. Ferroviária, Novorizontino and XV de Jaú were relegated at the end of the season.

== Championship ==
The championship was disputed in a double round-robin format, with the winners of the first and second rounds of the championship qualifying to the finals; In case that the same team won both rounds, it would automatically win the title.

=== First round ===
Pos	Team	Pld	W	D	L	GF	GA	GD	Pts	Qualification or relegation
1	Palmeiras	15	14	1	0	61	8	+53	43	Qualified to finals
2	Portuguesa	15	11	3	1	33	13	+20	36	
3	Mogi Mirim	15	10	2	3	20	13	+7	32	
4	Corinthians	15	8	4	3	37	17	+20	28	
5	São Paulo	15	7	4	4	26	21	+5	25	
6	União São João	15	6	5	4	25	19	+6	23	
7	América	15	6	3	6	23	30	−7	21	
8	Santos	15	6	2	7	24	27	−3	20	
9	Araçatuba	15	5	3	7	15	24	−9	18	
10	Rio Branco	15	5	2	8	20	24	−4	17	
11	Juventus	15	4	3	8	12	22	−10	15	
12	Novorizontino	15	3	6	6	17	27	−10	15	
13	XV de Jaú	15	3	3	9	17	33	−16	12	
14	Botafogo	15	3	3	9	20	39	−19	12	
15	Guarani	15	2	3	10	10	28	−18	9	
16	Ferroviária	15	1	5	9	13	28	−15	8	

Updated to match(es) played on 30 March 1996. Source: RSSSF.com
Rules for classification: 1) points; 2) wins; 3) goal difference; 4) number of goals scored.

=== Second round ===
Pos	Team	Pld	W	D	L	GF	GA	GD	Pts	Qualification or relegation
1	Palmeiras	15	13	1	1	41	11	+30	40	Qualified to finals
2	Santos	15	10	1	4	45	27	+18	31	
3	São Paulo	15	9	3	3	28	14	+14	30	
4	Botafogo	15	9	2	4	24	21	+3	29	
5	Guarani	15	7	4	4	17	14	+3	25	
6	Corinthians	15	6	6	3	21	14	+7	24	
7	Araçatuba	15	6	3	6	25	28	−3	21	
8	Rio Branco	15	5	5	5	22	25	−3	20	
9	Juventus	15	3	9	3	23	24	−1	18	
10	América	15	4	5	6	16	21	−5	17	
11	Portuguesa	15	3	8	4	20	17	+3	17	
12	Mogi Mirim	15	3	4	8	22	21	+1	13	
13	Novorizontino	15	3	4	8	19	28	−9	13	
14	XV de Jaú	15	3	3	9	13	26	−13	12	
15	União São João	15	1	8	6	11	27	−16	11	
16	Ferroviária	15	0	4	11	14	43	−29	4	

Updated to match(es) played on 10 June 1996. Source: RSSSF.com
Rules for classification: 1) points; 2) wins; 3) goal difference; 4) number of goals scored.

=== Final standings ===
Pos	Team	Pld	W	D	L	GF	GA	GD	Pts	Qualification or relegation
1	Palmeiras	30	27	2	1	102	19	+83	83	Champions
2	São Paulo	30	16	7	7	54	35	+19	55	
3	Portuguesa	30	14	11	5	53	30	+23	53	
4	Corinthians	30	14	10	6	58	31	+27	52	
5	Santos	30	16	3	11	69	54	+15	51	
6	Mogi Mirim	30	13	6	11	42	34	+8	45	
7	Botafogo	30	12	5	13	44	60	−16	41	
8	Araçatuba	30	11	6	13	40	52	−12	39	
9	América	30	10	8	12	39	51	−12	38	
10	Rio Branco	30	10	7	13	42	49	−7	37	
11	Guarani	30	9	7	14	27	42	−15	34	
12	União São João	30	7	13	10	36	46	−10	34	
13	Juventus	30	7	12	11	35	46	−11	33	
14	Novorizontino	30	6	10	14	36	55	−19	28	Relegated
15	XV de Jaú	30	6	6	18	30	59	−29	24	Relegated
16	Ferroviária	30	1	9	20	27	71	−44	12	Relegated

Updated to match(es) played on 10 June 1996. Source: RSSSF.com
Rules for classification: 1) points; 2) wins; 3) goal difference; 4) number of goals scored.

== Top Scores ==
Rank	Player	Club	Goals
1	Giovanni	Santos	24
2	Luizao	Palmeiras	22
3	Marcelinho	Corinthians	19
4	Rivaldo	Palmeiras	18
5	Valdir	São Paulo	17
6	Muller	Palmeiras	15
6	Djalminha	Palmeiras	15
6	Tiba	Portuguesa	15
9	Edmundo	Corinthians	13
10	Adriano Gerlin	América	12
