= Velloso (footballer, born 1968) =

Brazilian footballer

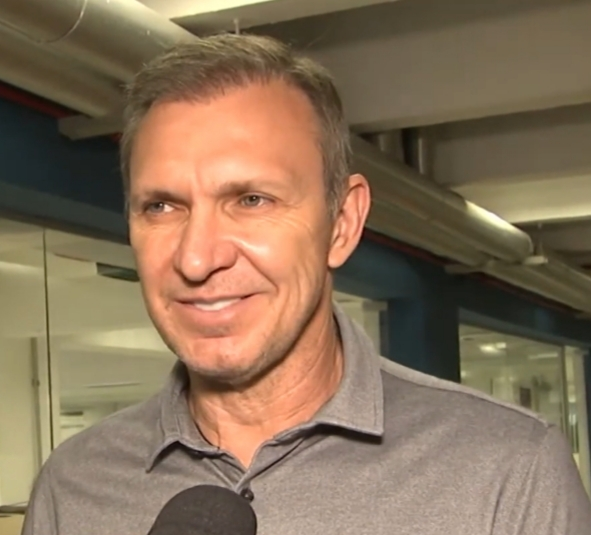

Personal information
- Full name: Wagner Fernando Velloso
- Date of birth: 22 September 1968 (age 58)
- Place of birth: Araras, Brazil
- Height: 1.90 m (6 ft 3 in)
- Position: Goalkeeper

Senior career*
Years	Team	Apps	(Gls)
1988–1999	Palmeiras	329	(0)
1992	→ USJ Araras (loan)	45	(0)
1993	→ Santos (loan)	24	(0)
1999–2004	Mineiro	185	(0)
2005	Sorocaba	3	(0)

International career
1990	Brazil	1	(0)

Managerial career
- 2007: CENE
- 2008: América-SP
- 2008-2009: Catanduvense
- 2009: Paraná
- 2009: Mogi Mirim
- 2011: Itapirense
- 2012: CENE
- * Club domestic league appearances and goals

Wagner Fernando Velloso (born 22 September 1968), is a Brazilian former professional footballer and former manager who currently works as a pundit for Bandeirantes.

Throughout his career, he played mainly for Palmeiras and Atlético Mineiro, with brief spells for Santos, União São João and Atlético Sorocaba.

== Playing career ==
=== Palmeiras ===
Born in Araras, São Paulo, Velloso was a product of Palmeiras' youth system, and made his debut for Verdão in a friendly match on 28 August 1988 at the age of 19, in a 6–1 win against Operário de Ponta Grossa. He was the team's third-choice goalkeeper, behind Zetti and Ivan, who were both out due to injury. The young keeper was considered a key player during the 1989 season.

Velloso lost the starting spot to Ivan midway through the 1990 season. Not getting too much playing time and following the acquisition of Carlos, on 1992, Velloso was sent on loan to his hometown club, União São João. He played a significant part in the club's campaign, winning promotion to the 1993 Campeonato Brasileiro Série A.

Back in Palmeiras for the 1993 Campeonato Paulista, Velloso established himself as the first-choice goalkeeper once again, before losing his place to Sérgio following an injury. Nevertheless, he got a medal as the team won the competition. He was loaned once again for the 1993 season, this time to Santos. The move successfully revived his career as Peixe finished fifth on the Brasileirão table.

Despite his success during his loan period, he started the year as a backup to Sérgio and new acquisition Gato Fernández. Following the 1994 Campeonato Paulista title, Velloso went on to become the club's undisputed starter for the next five seasons, being voted as the best goalkeeper in the 1994 Campeonato Brasileiro, as Palmeiras won the title for the second straight year. On 15 April 1995, he made his 200th appearance for the club. Velloso again was chosen as the best goalkeeper of the 1995 and 1996 Campeonato Paulista. He reached the 1996 Copa do Brasil finals against Cruzeiro. During the match he performed a save on a Palhinha chip shot which is regarded by fans as one of his greatest saves ever, but minutes later, he made a mistake which resulted in a goal by Marcelo Ramos, winning the title for Cruzeiro. Two years later he would make up for that error, leading the club to victory in the 1998 Copa do Brasil, and also being nominated as the best goalkeeper of the tournament.

Velloso's solid run as the starter would come to an end after he injured his foot in March 1999. He was replaced by Marcos, who would go on to lead Palmeiras to the 1999 Copa Libertadores title and become one of the greatest Palmeiras players of all time.

=== Atlético Mineiro ===
After losing his place on the starting lineup, Velloso moved to Atlético Mineiro to be the club's first choice goalkeeper following the departure of club legend Taffarel. He made his Galo debut on 31 July 1999, keeping a clean sheet in a 2–0 win over Gama. He helped Atlético reach the 1999 Campeonato Brasileiro finals against Corinthians, losing the title after a tiebreaker match.

The following season, Velloso kept his good form as he played a key role in the 2000 Campeonato Mineiro win. He led Galo to the Libertadores quarterfinals, keeping three clean sheets in the competition, before being eliminated by Corinthians.

Velloso had an outstanding 2001 season with Atlético, serving as club captain and making his 100th appearance for the club in their game against bitter rivals Cruzeiro on 10 March 2001. The same year he helped the club reach the Brasileirão semifinals. He injured his left shoulder during a match against Inter on 31 March 2002, ruling him out for the rest of the season.

Velloso reclaimed his starting spot for the 2003 season, before being sidelined again due to another shoulder injury in February 2004. He was involved in a contract dispute during his time away from football, Velloso sued the club in the Labor Court, demanding the payment of R$96,000 in labor rights and the termination of his contract, which would run until 2005. The goalkeeper lost the appeal, being ordered to pay Atlético R$550,000 for the termination of his contract.

Although he left on a sour note, Velloso was constantly praised by the fans during his time at Galo, making 231 appearances between 1999 and 2004.

In February 2005, Velloso had signed for Atlético Sorocaba, playing for the club in three Campeonato Paulista matches. On 13 March 2005 he played his final match as a professional player, starting in a 1–1 draw against Guarani, when he suffered yet another shoulder injury that brought his playing career to an end.

== Managerial career ==
Following retirement, Velloso served as Pintado's coaching intern for Atlético Sorocaba, also holding the same position for Santos under Alexandre Gallo and Atlético Paranaense under Antônio Lopes. In May 2005 he was hired to be Pintado's assistant coach during his tenure at Rio Branco de Americana.

After Pintado left for Taubaté, in November 2006 Velloso became manager of Campeonato Sul-Mato-Grossense side CENE. His first match in charge of the club was on 28 January 2007, a 5–0 win over Rio Verde. However, on 2 April 2007, following a 2–1 defeat away at Operário de Campo Grande, Velloso was dismissed by the club after only nine games. Nevertheless, he had a pretty decent performance for CENE, having amassed five state league wins during his tenure. "The club didn't have much money, the squad was filled with many young players and we were close to reaching the goal set for the season, which was to qualify for the Série C. But they [directors] thought it best to change", he stated.

Velloso was announced as the manager of América de Rio Preto for the 2008 Campeonato Paulista Série A2. His first match in charge was a 1–0 home win over União São João. After five games without a win, he stepped down. Velloso had another opportunity as an intern, this time under Portugal national team manager Luiz Felipe Scolari during the UEFA Euro 2008.

In May 2008 Velloso became manager of Catanduvense. He led the team to the 2008 Copa Paulista quarterfinals. After a poor start to the 2009 Paulistão Série A2, he was sacked by the club following a 3–0 defeat to Taquaritinga. On 10 March 2009 he was presented as the new manager for Paraná Clube and was fired on 8 May 2009. Soon after, Velloso signed as coach of Mogi Mirim for the 2009 Copa Paulista, leaving the team after reaching the semifinals.

He had a short unsuccessful stint at Itapirense during the 2011 Copa Paulista. He resigned following a 3–0 loss to Inter de Limeira in August 2011. Velloso was appointed as manager of CENE once again on 15 December 2011. He was fired after a single official match, a 2–1 loss to Comercial.

== Media career ==
Since 2016, Velloso appears as a pundit on Bandeirantes' football coverage and Os Donos da Bola.

== Managerial statistics ==
As of match played 13 May 2018

Managerial record by team and tenure
Team	From	To	Record					Ref.
Team	From	To	P	W	D	L	Win %	Ref.
CENE	13 November 2006	2 April 2007	9	5	1	3	55.6	
América-SP	January 2008	February 2008	6	1	3	2	16.7	
Catanduvense	May 2008	February 2009	24	9	9	6	37.5	
Paraná	10 March 2009	8 May 2009	13	5	3	5	38.5	
Mogi Mirim	2 June 2009	23 November 2009	24	11	7	6	45.8	
Itapirense	2 June 2011	31 August 2011	8	1	2	5	12.5	
CENE	15 December 2011	15 February 2012	1	0	0	1	0.0	
Total			85	32	25	28	37.6	—

== Honours ==
Palmeiras

- São Paulo State Championship: 1993, 1996
- Brazilian Série A: 1994
- Brazilian Cup: 1998
- Mercosur Cup: 1998
- Copa Libertadores: 1999

Atlético Mineiro

- Minas Gerais State Championship: 2000
