= 2001 São Paulo FC season =

São Paulo
2001 season
- Chairman: Paulo Amaral Vasconcelos
- Manager: Vadão (until May 24); Nelsinho Baptista
- Campeonato Brasileiro: Quarter-finals
- Torneio Rio-São Paulo: Champions (1st title)
- Campeonato Paulista: 8th
- Copa do Brasil: Quarter-finals
- Copa dos Campeões: Runners-up
- Copa Mercosur: Group stage
- Top goalscorer: League: França (13); All: França (45)
- Highest home attendance: 71,668 ( v Botafogo in the Torneio Rio-São Paulo)
- Lowest home attendance: 4,509 ( v Coritiba in the Copa dos Campeões)

The 2001 season was São Paulo's 72nd season since club's existence. São Paulo won the Torneio Rio-São Paulo for the first time beating Botafogo in an aggregated score by 6-2 (4-1 Away; 2-1 Home). In Campeonato Paulista the club finished in 8th place. Tricolor reach the Quarter-finals at the Campeonato Brasileiro and Copa do Brasil losing to Atlético Paranaense in the league and to Grêmio at the cup. São Paulo was eliminated at the group stage in the Copa Mercosur and became a runners-up at the Copa dos Campeões after was defeated by Flamengo.

== Squad ==
- Final squad

Note: Flags indicate national team as defined under FIFA eligibility rules; some limited exceptions apply. Players may hold more than one non-FIFA nationality.

| No. | Pos. | Nation | Player |
|---|---|---|---|
| — | GK | BRA | Rogério Ceni |
| — | GK | BRA | Roger |
| — | GK | BRA | Alencar |
| — | DF | BRA | Belletti |
| — | DF | BRA | Reginaldo Araújo |
| — | DF | BRA | Émerson |
| — | DF | BRA | Gustavo Nery |
| — | DF | BRA | Júlio Santos |
| — | DF | BRA | Lino |
| — | DF | BRA | Wilson |
| — | DF | BRA | Reginaldo |
| — | MF | CHI | Claudio Maldonado |

| No. | Pos. | Nation | Player |
|---|---|---|---|
| — | MF | BRA | Adriano |
| — | MF | BRA | Fábio Simplício |
| — | MF | BRA | Júlio Baptista |
| — | MF | BRA | Kaká |
| — | MF | BRA | Alexandre |
| — | MF | BRA | Leonardo |
| — | FW | BRA | Reinaldo |
| — | FW | BRA | Luís Fabiano |
| — | FW | BRA | Dill |
| — | FW | BRA | Sandro Hiroshi |
| — | FW | BRA | França |

== Scorers ==
| Position | Nation | Playing position | Name | Torneio Rio-São Paulo | Campeonato Paulista | Copa do Brasil | Copa dos Campeões | Copa Mercosur | Campeonato Brasileiro | Total |
|---|---|---|---|---|---|---|---|---|---|---|
| 1 | (Brazil) | FW | França | 6 | 10 | 8 | 5 | 3 | 13 | 45 |
| 2 | (Brazil) | FW | Luís Fabiano | 2 | 5 | 5 | 7 | 2 | 10 | 31 |
| 3 | (Brazil) | MF | Kaká | 2 | 2 | 1 | 1 | 0 | 11 | 17 |
| 4 | (Brazil) | MF | Júlio Baptista | 0 | 3 | 4 | 0 | 0 | 4 | 11 |
| 5 | (Brazil) | MF | Carlos Miguel | 1 | 3 | 1 | 0 | 0 | 0 | 5 |
| 6 | (Brazil) | MF | Fábio Simplício | 0 | 1 | 0 | 3 | 0 | 0 | 4 |
| = | (Brazil) | DF | Gustavo Nery | 1 | 1 | 1 | 0 | 0 | 1 | 4 |
| 7 | (Brazil) | FW | Adriano | 0 | 0 | 0 | 0 | 0 | 3 | 3 |
| = | (Brazil) | DF | Belletti | 0 | 1 | 0 | 0 | 0 | 1 | 2 |
| = | (Brazil) | MF | Fabiano | 1 | 0 | 0 | 2 | 0 | 0 | 3 |
| 8 | (Brazil) | FW | Ilan | 1 | 0 | 1 | 0 | 0 | 0 | 2 |
| = | (Brazil) | DF | Jean | 0 | 0 | 0 | 1 | 1 | 0 | 2 |
| = | (Brazil) | FW | Leandro Alves | 0 | 0 | 0 | 0 | 0 | 2 | 2 |
| = | (Brazil) | DF | Reginaldo Araújo | 0 | 0 | 0 | 0 | 1 | 1 | 2 |
| = | (Brazil) | FW | Reinaldo | 0 | 0 | 0 | 0 | 0 | 2 | 2 |
| = | (Brazil) | FW | Renatinho | 0 | 2 | 0 | 0 | 0 | 0 | 2 |
| = | (Brazil) | GK | Rogério Ceni | 0 | 1 | 0 | 1 | 0 | 0 | 2 |
| = | (Brazil) | DF | Rogério Pinheiro | 0 | 1 | 0 | 1 | 0 | 0 | 2 |
| = | (Brazil) | MF | Alexandre | 0 | 0 | 1 | 0 | 0 | 0 | 1 |
| = | (Brazil) | FW | Fabiano Souza | 0 | 0 | 1 | 0 | 0 | 0 | 1 |
| = | (Brazil) | DF | Lino | 0 | 0 | 0 | 0 | 0 | 1 | 1 |
| = | (Brazil) | DF | Reginaldo | 0 | 1 | 0 | 0 | 0 | 0 | 1 |
| = | (Brazil) | MF | Sidney | 1 | 0 | 0 | 0 | 0 | 0 | 1 |
| = | (Brazil) | DF | Wilson | 0 | 1 | 0 | 0 | 0 | 0 | 1 |
| / | / | / | Own Goals | 0 | 0 | 1 | 0 | 0 | 0 | 1 |
| | | | Total | 15 | 32 | 24 | 21 | 7 | 49 | 148 |

=== Overall ===
| Games played | 70 (8 Torneio Rio-São Paulo, 15 Campeonato Paulista, 7 Copa do Brasil, 6 Copa dos Campeões, 6 Copa Mercosur, 28 Campeonato Brasileiro) |
| Games won | 35 (5 Torneio Rio-São Paulo, 6 Campeonato Paulista, 5 Copa do Brasil, 5 Copa dos Campeões, 1 Copa Mercosur, 13 Campeonato Brasileiro) |
| Games drawn | 15 (1 Torneio Rio-São Paulo, 3 Campeonato Paulista, 0 Copa do Brasil, 0 Copa dos Campeões, 4 Copa Mercosur, 7 Campeonato Brasileiro) |
| Games lost | 20 (2 Torneio Rio-São Paulo, 6 Campeonato Paulista, 2 Copa do Brasil, 1 Copa dos Campeões, 1 Copa Mercosur, 8 Campeonato Brasileiro) |
| Goals scored | 148 |
| Goals conceded | 96 |
| Goal difference | +52 |
| Best result | 10–0 (H) v Botafogo-PB - Copa do Brasil - 2001.3.28 |
| Worst result | 1–7 (A) v Vasco da Gama - Campeonato Brasileiro - 2001.11.25 |
| Top scorer | França (45 goals) |

== Official competitions ==
=== Torneio Rio-São Paulo ===
| 17 January First stage | São Paulo | 2–0 | Vasco da Gama | São Paulo |
| 00:00 (UTC-3) | Sidney 35'; Gustavo Nery 58' | (Report) (pt) | | Stadium: Morumbi; Referee: Amaurilio Marchareth Saleão |

| 25 January First stage | Fluminense | 5–2 | São Paulo | Niterói |
| 00:00 (UTC-3) | Asprilla 41', 90+3'; Agnaldo 49', 90'; Régis 66' | (Report) (pt) | Fabiano 63'; Ilan 84' | Stadium: Caio Martins; Referee: Sálvio Spínola |

| 1 February First stage | São Paulo | 1–1 | Botafogo | São Paulo |
| 00:00 (UTC-3) | França 17' | (Report) (pt) | Donizete 60' | Stadium: Morumbi; Referee: Ubiraci Damásio |

| 7 February First stage | Flamengo | 0–2 | São Paulo | Rio de Janeiro |
| 00:00 (UTC-3) | | (Report) (pt) | França 65' (pen.), 79' | Stadium: Maracanã; Referee: João Luís dos Santos |

| 14 February Semifinals | São Paulo | 1–0 | Fluminense | São Paulo |
| 00:00 (UTC-3) | França 69' | (Report) (pt) | | Stadium: Morumbi; Referee: Reinaldo Ribas |

| 21 February Semifinals | Fluminense | 2–1 (6–7 p) | São Paulo | Rio de Janeiro |
| 00:00 (UTC-3) | Marco Brito 52', 58' | (Report) (pt) | França 61' | Stadium: Maracanã; Referee: Edílson Pereira de Carvalho |
| | Penalties |
| | Marco Brito (penalty scored); Régis (penalty scored); Agnaldo (penalty scored); Agnaldo Liz (penalty scored); Roni (penalty missed); Fabinho (penalty scored); Marcão (penalty scored); César (penalty missed); Jorginho (penalty missed) | | (penalty missed) França; (penalty scored) Belletti; (penalty scored) Jean; (penalty scored) Fabiano; (penalty scored) Carlos Miguel; (penalty scored) Rogério Ceni; (penalty scored) Fábio Simplício; (penalty missed) Wilson; (penalty scored) Ilan |

| 28 February Finals | Botafogo | 1–4 | São Paulo | Rio de Janeiro |
| 00:00 (UTC-3) | Rodrigo 50' | (Report) (pt) | Carlos Miguel 49'; Luís Fabiano 51', 85'; França 62' | Stadium: Maracanã; Referee: Alfredo Loebeling |

| 7 March Finals | São Paulo | 2–1 (6–2 agg.) | Botafogo | São Paulo |
| 21:40 (UTC-3) | Kaká 79', 81' | (Report) (pt) | Donizete 39' | Stadium: Morumbi; Attendance: 71,668; Referee: Jorge Rabello |

==== Record ====
| Final Position | Points | Matches | Wins | Draws | Losses | Goals For | Goals Away | Win% |
|---|---|---|---|---|---|---|---|---|
| 1st | 16 | 8 | 5 | 1 | 2 | 15 | 10 | 66% |

=== Campeonato Paulista ===
| 20 January Round 1 | Mogi Mirim | 0–1 | São Paulo | Mogi-Mirim |
| 16:00 (UTC-3) | | (Report) (pt) | Wilson 54' | Stadium: Wilson Fernandes de Barros; Attendance: 10,305; Referee: Sílvia Regina de Oliveira / Alfredo Loebeling |

| 28 January Round 2 | Rio Branco | 2–1 | São Paulo | Americana |
| 16:00 (UTC-3) | Rafael 86', 90+2' | (Report) (pt) | França 55' | Stadium: Décio Vitta; Attendance: 8,303; Referee: Romildo Correa / Robério Pereira Pires |

| 4 February Round 3 | São Paulo | 4–2 | Santos | São Paulo |
| 16:00 (UTC-3) | Reginaldo 14'; Kaká 74'; Renatinho 80'; Gustavo Nery 90' | (Report) (pt) | Dodô 12', 88' | Stadium: Morumbi; Attendance: 14,149; Referee: Cleber Wellington Abade / Antônio Claúdio Perin |

| 10 February Round 4 | Internacional | 2–2 | São Paulo | Limeira |
| 16:00 (UTC-3) | Lúcio 90+1'; Luisinho Vieira 90+4' | (Report) (pt) | França 87'; Renatinho 89' | Stadium: Major José Levy Sobrinho; Referee: Paulo César de Oliveira / Sílvio César Talarico |

| 18 February Round 5 | São Paulo | 0–2 | São Caetano | São Paulo |
| 16:00 (UTC-3) | | (Report) (pt) | Sinval 72'; César 90+2' | Stadium: Morumbi; Attendance: 10,904; Referee: Romildo Corrêa / Tadeu Bosco |

| 24 February Round 6 | Matonense | 0–2 | São Paulo | Matão |
| 16:00 (UTC-3) | | (Report) (pt) | França 19'; Carlos Miguel 60' | Stadium: Hudson Ferreira; Referee: Edílson Pereira de Carvalho / Anselmo Costa |

| 3 March Round 7 | Ponte Preta | 2–2 | São Paulo | Campinas |
| 16:00 (UTC-3) | Piá 11' (pen.); Régis Pittbull 19' | (Report) (pt) | Luís Fabiano 71'; França 85' | Stadium: Moisés Lucarelli; Referee: Paulo César de Oliveira / Luiz Edmar Remondine |

| 11 March Round 8 | Palmeiras | 0–3 | São Paulo | São José do Rio Preto |
| 16:00 (UTC-3) | | (Report) (pt) | Fábio Simplício 8'; França 20'; Júlio Baptista 40' | Stadium: Benedito Teixeira; Attendance: 42,000; Referee: Edílson Pereira de Carvalho / Luis Cansian |

| 17 March Round 9 | Portuguesa Santista | 4–4 | São Paulo | Santos |
| 16:00 (UTC-3) | Zinho 28'; Tico Mineiro 37' (pen.), 84', 90' (pen.) | (Report) (pt) | Luís Fabiano 7'; Rogério Ceni 50'; Kaká 79'; França 81' | Stadium: Ulrico Mursa; Referee: Luciano Calabietto Qulichini / Luiz Edmar Remondine |

| 25 March Round 10 | São Paulo | 4–1 | Guarani | São Paulo |
| 16:00 (UTC-3) | Júlio Baptista 38'; Luís Fabiano 66'; Belletti 75'; Rogério Pinheiro 90+1' | (Report) (pt) | Lindomar 80' | Stadium: Morumbi |

| 31 March Round 11 | Botafogo | 2–1 | São Paulo | Ribeirão Preto |
| 16:00 (UTC-3) | Luciano Ratinho 45+1'; Leandro 70' | (Report) (pt) | França 58' | Stadium: Santa Cruz; Attendance: 30,240; Referee: Edílson Pereira de Carvalho / Sílvia Regina de Oliveira |

| 7 April Round 12 | União São João | 4–3 | São Paulo | Araras |
| 16:00 (UTC-3) | Domires Júnior 43' (pen.); Celso 48'; Bernardi 84'; Aílton 90' | (Report) (pt) | França 3' (pen.), 15'; Júlio Baptista 36' | Stadium: Hermitão; Referee: Paulo César de Oliveira / Luciano Calabietto Quilichini |

| 14 April Round 13 | União Barbarense | 3–2 | São Paulo | Santa Bárbara d'Oeste |
| 16:00 (UTC-3) | Emerson 43', 45+2'; Alberto 44' | (Report) (pt) | Carlos Miguel 1'; França 3' | Stadium: Antônio Guimarães |

| 22 April Round 14 | Portuguesa | 1–0 | São Paulo | São Paulo |
| 16:00 (UTC-3) | Cléber 55' | (Report) (pt) | | Stadium: Canindé; Attendance: 21,965; Referee: Paulo Danelon / Robério Pires |

| 29 April Round 15 | São Paulo | 3–1 | Corinthians | Presidente Prudente |
| 16:00 (UTC-3) | Carlos Miguel 9'; Luís Fabiano 23', 54' | (Report) (pt) | Scheidt 64' | Stadium: Prudentão |

==== Record ====
| Final Position | Points | Matches | Wins | Draws | Losses | Goals For | Goals Away | Win% |
|---|---|---|---|---|---|---|---|---|
| 8th | 24 | 15 | 6 | 3 | 6 | 32 | 26 | 53% |

=== Copa do Brasil ===
| 21 March Round of 64 | Botafogo-PB | 0–1 | São Paulo | João Pessoa |
| 00:00 (UTC-3) | | (Report) (pt) | Júlio Baptista 84' | Stadium: Almeidão |

| 28 March Round of 64 | São Paulo | 10–0 (11–0 agg.) | Botafogo-PB | São Paulo |
| 00:00 (UTC-3) | Luís Fabiano 13', 32'; França 16' (pen.), 18', 47'; Júlio Baptista 66', 85'; Gustavo Nery 70'; Kaká 78'; Fabiano Souza 89' | (Report) (pt) | | Stadium: Morumbi; Referee: Samir Yarak |

| 11 April Round of 32 | Ceará | 2–4 ( Eliminated second leg ) | São Paulo | Fortaleza |
| 00:00 (UTC-3) | Jairo Lenzi 82'; Zezinho 86' | (Report) (pt) | Carlos Miguel 3'; Júlio Baptista 52'; França 58' (pen.), 84' | Stadium: Presidente Vargas |

| 2 May Round of 16 | São Paulo | 3–0 | Vitória | São Paulo |
| 00:00 (UTC-3) | Luís Fabiano 21', 38'; Moura 25' (o.g.) | (Report) (pt) | | Stadium: Morumbi; Referee: Wilson de Souza Mendonça |

| 9 May Round of 16 | Vitória | 0–2 (0–5 agg.) | São Paulo | Salvador |
| 00:00 (UTC-3) | | (Report) (pt) | Luís Fabiano 42'; Ilan 90+2' | Stadium: Barradão; Attendance: 2,127; Referee: Jamir Garcez |

| 16 May Quarterfinals | Grêmio | 2–1 | São Paulo | Porto Alegre |
| 21:45 (UTC-3) | Warley 9'; Marinho 81' | (Report) (pt) | França 14' | Stadium: Olímpico; Attendance: 16,450; Referee: Luciano Augusto Teotonio Almeida |

| 23 May Quarterfinals | São Paulo | 3–4 (4–6 agg.) | Grêmio | São Paulo |
| 15:00 (UTC-3) | França 30' (pen.), 44'; Alexandre 68' | (Report) (pt) | Marcelinho Paraíba 28', 53', 57'; Zinho 84' (pen.) | Stadium: Morumbi; Referee: Wilson de Souza Mendonça |

==== Record ====
| Final Position | Points | Matches | Wins | Draws | Losses | Goals For | Goals Away | Win% |
|---|---|---|---|---|---|---|---|---|
| 5th | 15 | 7 | 5 | 0 | 2 | 24 | 8 | 71% |

=== Copa do Campeões ===
| 23 June First stage | São Paulo | 4–2 | Sport | Maceió |
| 18:30 (UTC-3) | Luís Fabiano 39', 89'; Fábio Simplício 49'; França 51' | (Report) (pt) | Dutra 54'; Leonardo 85' | Stadium: Rei Pelé; Referee: Álvaro Azeredo Quelhas |

| 27 June First stage | Sport | 0–5 (2–9 agg.) | São Paulo | João Pessoa |
| 19:15 (UTC-3) | | (Report) (pt) | Fábio Simplício 21'; Luís Fabiano 80'; Jean 85'; França 88', 90' | Stadium: Almeidão; Referee: Wagner Tardelli |

| 30 June Semifinals | Coritiba | 0–2 | São Paulo | João Pessoa |
| 16:00 (UTC-3) | | (Report) (pt) | Fabiano 67'; Rogério Ceni 72' | Stadium: Almeidão; Referee: Luciano Augusto Almeida |

| 4 July Semifinals | São Paulo | 4–1 (6–1 agg.) | Coritiba | Maceió |
| 21:45 (UTC-3) | Fábio Simplício 9'; Luís Fabiano 67', 74'; Fabiano 90+1' | (Report) (pt) | Enílton 16' | Stadium: Rei Pelé; Attendance: 4,509; Referee: Carlos Eugênio Simon |

| 8 July Finals | São Paulo | 3–5 | Flamengo | João Pessoa |
| 16:00 (UTC-3) | Luís Fabiano 16', 71'; Rogério Pinheiro 59' | (Report) (pt) | Edílson 14', 57'; Reinaldo 25'; Beto 36'; Rogério Pinheiro 79' (o.g.) | Stadium: Almeidão; Referee: Luciano Almeida |

| 11 July Finals | Flamengo | 2–3 (7–6 agg.) | São Paulo | Maceió |
| 21:45 (UTC-3) | Juan 47'; Petković 58' | (Report) (pt) | Kaká 39'; França 65' (pen.), 88' | Stadium: Rei Pelé; Referee: Márcio Rezende de Freitas |

==== Record ====
| Final Position | Points | Matches | Wins | Draws | Losses | Goals For | Goals Away | Win% |
|---|---|---|---|---|---|---|---|---|
| 2nd | 15 | 6 | 5 | 0 | 1 | 21 | 10 | 83% |

=== Copa Mercosur ===
| 25 July Group D | São Paulo (Brazil) | 3–0 | (Uruguay) Peñarol | São Paulo |
| 15:00 (UTC-3) | Luís Fabiano 4', 6'; Jean 85' | (Report) (pt) | | Stadium: Estádio do Morumbi; Referee: Oscar Sequeira (ARG) |

| 28 July Group D | Talleres (Argentina) | 0–0 | (Brazil) São Paulo | Córdoba |
| 21:10 (UTC-3) | | (Report) (pt) | | Stadium: Estadio Córdoba; Referee: Carlos Chandía (CHI) |

| 23 August Group D | São Paulo (Brazil) | 1–1 | (Argentina) Vélez Sarsfield | São Paulo |
| 15:00 (UTC-3) | França 70' | (Report) (pt) | Domínguez 63' | Stadium: Estádio do Morumbi; Referee: Epifanio Gonzáles (PAR) |

| 12 September Group D | Peñarol (Uruguay) | 1–1 | (Brazil) São Paulo | Montevideo |
| 21:40 (UTC-3) | Bengoechea 75' | (Report) (pt) | França 90' (pen.) | Stadium: Estádio Centenário; Referee: Cláudio Martin (ARG) |

| 26 September Group D | São Paulo (Brazil) | 0–0 | (Argentina) Talleres | São Paulo |
| 15:00 (UTC-3) | | (Report) (pt) | | Stadium: Estádio do Morumbi; Referee: Carlos Torres (PAR) |

| 17 October Group D | Vélez Sarsfield (Argentina) | 4–2 | (Brazil) São Paulo | Buenos Aires |
| 21:50 (UTC-3) | Gracián 2'; Fuentes 23'; Reginaldo Araújo 53' (o.g.); Husaín 63' | (Report) (pt) | França 15'; Reginaldo Araújo 71' | Stadium: Estadio José Amalfitani; Referee: Carlos Torres (PAR) |

==== Record ====
| Final Position | Points | Matches | Wins | Draws | Losses | Goals For | Goals Away | Win% |
|---|---|---|---|---|---|---|---|---|
| 15th | 7 | 6 | 1 | 4 | 1 | 7 | 6 | 38% |

=== Campeonato Brasileiro ===
| 1 August Round 1 | Botafogo-SP | 2–2 | São Paulo | Ribeirão Preto |
| 20:30 (UTC-3) | Mateus 22'; Marcos Denner 86' | (Report) (pt) | Belletti 38'; Júlio Baptista 90+14' | Stadium: Santa Cruz; Attendance: 13,625; Referee: Luís Marcelo Vicentin Cansiam |

| 5 August Round 2 | São Paulo | 0–0 | Gama | São Paulo |
| 14:30 (UTC-3) | | (Report) (pt) | | Stadium: Morumbi; Attendance: 14,892; Referee: Marco Colares Brasil |

| 8 August Round 3 | Vitória | 2–1 | São Paulo | Salvador |
| 20:30 (UTC-3) | Allan Dellon 26'; Dudu 31' | (Report) (pt) | Kaká 90' | Stadium: Barradão; Attendance: 3,171; Referee: Léo Feldman |

| 11 August Round 4 | São Paulo | 3–1 | Santa Cruz | São Paulo |
| 14:30 (UTC-3) | Kaká 5'; Júlio Baptista 70'; França 84' | (Report) (pt) | Paulinho Andreolli 77' | Stadium: Morumbi; Attendance: 7,687; Referee: Clever Assunção Gonçalves |

| 16 August Round 5 | Guarani | 1–2 | São Paulo | Campinas |
| 15:00 (UTC-3) | Fumagalli 16' | (Report) (pt) | Kaká 54'; Reinaldo 59' | Stadium: Brinco de Ouro; Attendance: 6,765; Referee: Cléber Abade |

| 19 August Round 6 | São Paulo | 2–1 | Atlético Paranaense | São Paulo |
| 15:00 (UTC-3) | Lino 2'; Kaká 20' | (Report) (pt) | Kléber Pereira 83' | Stadium: Morumbi; Attendance: 17,721; Referee: Jorge Rabello |

| 23 August Round 7 | São Paulo | 4–0 | Ponte Preta | São Paulo |
| 14:30 (UTC-3) | Kaká 13', 66'; Luís Fabiano 29'; França 77' | (Report) (pt) | | Stadium: Morumbi; Attendance: 16,135; Referee: Romildo Correa |

| 29 August Round 8 | Juventude | 3–3 | São Paulo | Caxias do Sul |
| 21:45 (UTC-3) | Fernando Menegazzo 25'; Michel 70'; Leonardo Manzi 78' | (Report) (pt) | França 65', 75'; Luís Fabiano 84' | Stadium: Estádio Alfredo Jaconi; Attendance: 3,794; Referee: Paulo Henrique Bezerra |

| 2 September Round 9 | São Paulo | 0–1 | Bahia | São Paulo |
| 15:00 (UTC-3) | | (Report) (pt) | Jean Elias 81' | Stadium: Morumbi; Attendance: 17,437; Referee: Heber Roberto Lopes |

| 9 September Round 10 | Goiás | 2–3 | São Paulo | Goiânia |
| 16:00 (UTC-3) | Itamar 54'; Bilu 84' | (Report) (pt) | França 70'; Leandro Alves 72', 87' | Stadium: Serra Dourada; Attendance: 23,663; Referee: Luciano Almeida |

| 15 September Round 11 | São Paulo | 1–3 | Paraná | São Paulo |
| 15:00 (UTC-3) | Luís Fabiano 67' | (Report) (pt) | Ageu 7', 12'; Flávio Guilherme 46' | Stadium: Morumbi; Attendance: 8,183; Referee: Alexandre Lourenço Barreto |

| 20 September Round 12 | Coritiba | 0–1 | São Paulo | Curitiba |
| 20:30 (UTC-3) | | (Report) (pt) | Reinaldo 81' | Stadium: Couto Pereira; Attendance: 7,831; Referee: Fabiano Gonçalves |

| 23 September Round 13 | São Paulo | 4–1 | América | São Paulo |
| 15:00 (UTC-3) | Luís Fabiano 11'; França 17'; Kaká 72', 75' | (Report) (pt) | Somália 6' | Stadium: Morumbi; Attendance: 8,047; Referee: Leonardo Gaciba |

| 30 September Round 14 | Sport | 1–0 | São Paulo | Recife |
| 16:00 (UTC-3) | Fabinho 82' | (Report) (pt) | | Stadium: Estádio Ilha do Retiro; Attendance: 7,897; Referee: Léo Feldman |

| 3 October Round 15 | Santos | 1–0 | São Paulo | Santos |
| 21:45 (UTC-3) | Viola 13' (pen.) | (Report) (pt) | | Stadium: Vila Belmiro; Attendance: 19,525; Referee: Cleber Welington Abade |

| 6 October Round 16 | São Paulo | 0–1 | Palmeiras | São Paulo |
| 15:00 (UTC-3) | | (Report) (pt) | Tuta 73' | Stadium: Morumbi; Attendance: 20,653; Referee: Alfredo Loebeling |

| 11 October Round 17 | São Paulo | 1–1 | Grêmio | São Paulo |
| 15:00 (UTC-3) | Júlio Baptista 6' | (Report) (pt) | Leandro Amaral 23' | Stadium: Morumbi; Attendance: 4,751; Referee: Luciano Augusto Almeida |

| 14 October Round 18 | Fluminense | 1–1 | São Paulo | Rio de Janeiro |
| 16:00 (UTC-3) | André Luís 62' | (Report) (pt) | França 15' | Stadium: Maracanã; Attendance: 39,807; Referee: Márcio Rezende de Freitas |

| 21 October Round 19 | São Paulo | 1–0 | Portuguesa | São José do Rio Preto |
| 16:00 (UTC-3) | França 4' | (Report) (pt) | | Stadium: Benedito Teixeira; Attendance: 8,362; Referee: Edílson Pereira de Carvalho |

| 27 October Round 20 | São Paulo | 0–0 | São Caetano | São Paulo |
| 16:00 (UTC-3) | | (Report) (pt) | | Stadium: Morumbi; Attendance: 19,531; Referee: Salvio Spinola Fagundes Filho |

| 3 November Round 21 | São Paulo | 1–1 | Corinthians | São José do Rio Preto |
| 16:00 (UTC-3) | Kaká 60' | (Report) (pt) | Deivid 86' | Stadium: Benedito Teixeira; Attendance: 20,160; Referee: Alfredo Loebeling |

| 7 November Round 22 | Internacional | 1–4 | São Paulo | Porto Alegre |
| 18:00 (UTC-3) | Silvinho 20' | (Report) (pt) | França 18', 48'; Luís Fabiano 57'; Gustavo Nery 78' | Stadium: Beira-Rio; Attendance: 11,759; Referee: Márcio Rezende de Freitas |

| 10 November Round 23 | São Paulo | 3–1 | Botafogo-RJ | São Paulo |
| 16:00 (UTC-3) | Luís Fabiano 36', 63'; Reginaldo Araújo 45' | (Report) (pt) | Dodô 90+1' (pen.) | Stadium: Morumbi; Attendance: 15,939; Referee: Alício Pena Júnior |

| 15 November Round 24 | São Paulo | 3–1 | Flamengo | São Paulo |
| 16:00 (UTC-3) | França 10'; Luís Fabiano 34', 67' | (Report) (pt) | Anderson 33' | Stadium: Morumbi; Attendance: 38,160; Referee: Carlos Eugênio Simon |

| 18 November Round 25 | Cruzeiro | 1–4 | São Paulo | Belo Horizonte |
| 16:00 (UTC-3) | Cris 64' | (Report) (pt) | Kaká 22'; Adriano 29'; França 35'; Luís Fabiano 70' | Stadium: Mineirão; Attendance: 22,027; Referee: Jorge Rabelo |

| 25 November Round 26 | Vasco da Gama | 7–1 | São Paulo | Rio de Janeiro |
| 16:00 (UTC-3) | Gilberto 19'; Euller 37'; Romário 48', 66', 70'; Léo Lima 69'; Dedé 79' | (Report) (pt) | França 90' | Stadium: São Januário; Referee: Carlos Eugênio Simon |

| 2 December Round 27 | São Paulo | 3–0 | Atlético Mineiro | São Paulo |
| 16:00 (UTC-3) | Adriano 17'; Kaká 33'; Júlio Baptista 82' | (Report) (pt) | | Stadium: Morumbi; Attendance: 43,791; Referee: Luciano Augusto Almeida |

| 5 December Quarterfinal | Atlético Paranaense | 2–1 | São Paulo | Curitiba |
| 21:45 (UTC-3) | Kléber Pereira 28'; Alex Mineiro 80' | (Report) (pt) | Adriano 66' (pen.) | Stadium: Arena da Baixada; Attendance: 30,000; Referee: Antônio Pereira da Silva |

==== Record ====
| Final Position | Points | Matches | Wins | Draws | Losses | Goals For | Goals Away | Win% |
|---|---|---|---|---|---|---|---|---|
| 7th | 46 | 28 | 13 | 7 | 8 | 49 | 36 | 66% |
