= 1999 São Paulo FC season =

São Paulo
1999 season
- Chairman: Paulo Amaral Vasconcelos
- Manager: Paulo César Carpegiani
- Campeonato Brasileiro: Semi-finals
- Torneio Rio-São Paulo: Semi-finals
- Campeonato Paulista: Semi-finals
- Copa do Brasil: Round of 16
- Copa Mercosur: Group stage
- Top goalscorer: League: França (12); All: França (28)

The 1999 season was São Paulo's 70th season since club's existence.

== Statistics ==
=== Scorers ===
Position	Nation	Playing position	Name	Torneio Rio-São Paulo	Campeonato Paulista	Copa do Brasil	Campeonato Brasileiro	Copa Mercosur	Copa Libertadores	Others	Total
1	(Brazil)	FW	França	0	5	2	12	4	1	4	28
2	(Brazil)	MF	Marcelinho Paraíba	0	8	1	9	1	0	1	20
3	(Brazil)	DF	Serginho	4	7	2	0	0	0	1	14
4	(Brazil)	FW	Dodô	3	8	1	0	0	0	1	13
5	(Brazil)	DF	Edmílson	3	2	0	2	0	0	0	7
=	(Brazil)	MF	Raí	0	3	0	3	1	0	0	7
6	(Brazil)	FW	Warley	1	4	1	0	0	0	0	6
7	(Brazil)	GK	Rogério Ceni	0	3	0	1	1	0	0	5
=	(Brazil)	MF	Souza	0	0	0	2	1	0	2	5
=	(Brazil)	DF	Wilson	0	1	0	2	1	1	0	5
8	(Brazil)	MF	Carlos Miguel	0	0	1	2	1	0	0	4
=	(Brazil)	MF	Edu	0	2	0	0	0	0	2	4
=	(Brazil)	DF	Márcio Santos	0	2	0	1	1	0	0	4
=	(Brazil)	FW	Sandro Hiroshi	0	0	0	1	0	0	3	4
9	(Brazil)	DF	Bordon	0	2	0	0	0	0	0	2
=	(Brazil)	FW	Emerson	0	0	0	2	0	0	0	2
=	(Brazil)	DF	Jorginho	0	0	0	1	0	0	1	2
=	(Brazil)	MF	Reinaldo	0	0	2	0	0	0	0	2
=	(Brazil)	MF	Vágner	0	0	0	2	0	0	0	2
10	(Brazil)	FW	Adriano	0	0	0	0	0	0	1	1
=	(Brazil)	DF	Ânderson Lima	0	0	0	1	0	0	0	1
=	(Brazil)	DF	Belletti	1	0	0	0	0	0	0	1
=	(Brazil)	MF	Fabiano	0	0	0	1	0	0	0	1
=	(Brazil)	DF	Fábio Aurélio	0	0	0	1	0	0	0	1
=	(Brazil)	FW	Jacques	0	0	0	0	0	1	0	1
=	(Brazil)	DF	Nem	0	0	0	0	0	0	1	1
=	(Brazil)	DF	Zé Carlos	0	0	0	0	0	0	1	1
			Own goals	0	0	0	2	0	1	1	4
			Total	12	45	10	47	11	4	19	148

=== Overall ===
Games played	70 (8 Torneio Rio-São Paulo, 17 Campeonato Paulista, 4 Copa do Brasil, 6 Copa Mercosur, 26 Campeonato Brasileiro, 2 Copa Libertadores seletive, 5 Friendly match)
Games won	41 (5 Torneio Rio-São Paulo, 12 Campeonato Paulista, 2 Copa do Brasil, 3 Copa Mercosur, 13 Campeonato Brasileiro, 1 Copa Libertadores seletive, 5 Friendly match)
Games drawn	7 (1 Torneio Rio-São Paulo, 4 Campeonato Paulista, 1 Copa do Brasil, 1 Copa Mercosur, 1 Campeonato Brasileiro, 0 Copa Libertadores seletive, 0 Friendly match)
Games lost	20 (2 Torneio Rio-São Paulo, 2 Campeonato Paulista, 1 Copa do Brasil, 2 Copa Mercosur, 12 Campeonato Brasileiro, 1 Copa Libertadores seletive, 0 Friendly match)
Goals scored	148
Goals conceded	88
Goal difference	+60
Best result	5–0 (H) v Bayer Leverkusen - Friendly match - 1999.01.20; 5–0 (A) v Cruz Azul - Friendly match - 1999.07.22
Worst result	1–5 (A) v Boca Juniors - Copa Mercosur - 1999.08.01
Top scorer	

Source: São Paulo FC

== Friendlies ==
=== Euro-America Cup ===
January 17 International friendly	São Paulo (Brazil)	4–1	(Paraguay) Olimpia	São Paulo
00:00 (UTC-3)	Souza 10'; Nem 38'; Jorginho 64'; Adriano 87'		Torres 83'	Stadium: Estádio do Morumbi; Attendance: 7,732; Referee: Oscar Roberto Godoi

January 20 International friendly	São Paulo (Brazil)	5–0	(Germany) Bayer Leverkusen	São Paulo
00:00 (UTC-3)	Ramelow 4' (o.g.); Zé Carlos 20'; Souza 44'; Dodô 45'; Serginho 55' (pen.)			Stadium: Estádio do Morumbi; Attendance: 14,819; Referee: Edílson Pereira de Carvalho

=== La Soccer Cup ===
July 18 International friendly	Monarcas Morelia (Mexico)	1–2	(Brazil) São Paulo	Los Angeles
00:00 (UTC-3)	Gabriel García 76'		Sandro Hiroshi 34', 45'	Stadium: Weingart Stadium; Referee: Marcey Raffa

=== Trofeo Ciudad de Pachuca ===
July 20 International friendly	Pachuca (Mexico)	0–3	(Brazil) São Paulo	Pachuca
00:00 (UTC-3)			França 52'; Marcelinho 75'; Edu 88'	Stadium: Estadio Hidalgo; Referee: Felipe de Jesús Riso

July 22 International friendly	Cruz Azul (Mexico)	0–5	(Brazil) São Paulo	Pachuca
00:00 (UTC-3)			França 1', 13', 61'; Sandro Hiroshi 37'; Edu 75'	Stadium: Estadio Hidalgo; Referee: Armando Achundia (MEX)

== Official competitions ==
=== Torneio Rio-São Paulo ===
January 23 Round 1	São Paulo	1–0	Flamengo	São Paulo
16:00 (UTC-3)	Dodô 51'			Stadium: Morumbi; Attendance: 19,720; Referee: Álvaro Azevedo Quelhas

January 28 Round 2	Corinthians	1–2	São Paulo	São Paulo
20:30 (UTC-3)	Marcelinho Carioca 82' (pen.)		Edimílson 3'; Belletti 90'	Stadium: Pacaembu; Attendance: 11,547; Referee: Jorge dos Santos Travassos

January 31 Round 3	São Paulo	2–0	Botafogo	São Paulo
18:30 (UTC-3)	Dodô 1'; Serginho 21'			Stadium: Morumbi; Attendance: 17,264; Referee: Vágner Tardelli

February 3 Round 4	Flamengo	0–1	São Paulo	Rio de Janeiro
20:30 (UTC-3)			Edmílson 68'	Stadium: Maracanã; Attendance: 53,235; Referee: Sálvio Spínola

February 7 Round 5	Botafogo	2–1	São Paulo	Rio de Janeiro
18:30 (UTC-3)	Bebeto 10'; Sérgio Manoel 83'		Edmílson 33'	Stadium: Maracanã; Attendance: 18,779; Referee: Antônio Cláudio Perin

February 10 Round 6	São Paulo	1–1	Corinthians	São Paulo
20:30 (UTC-3)	Serginho 74' (pen.)		Marcelinho Carioca 24'	Stadium: Morumbi; Attendance: 7,375; Referee: Carlos Manoel Carneiros Faria

February 21 Semifinals	Vasco da Gama	2–3	São Paulo	Rio de Janeiro
18:30 (UTC-3)	Juninho Pernambucano 50'; Luizão 60'		Serginho 8', 45' (pen.); Dodô 41'	Stadium: Maracanã; Attendance: 31,677; Referee: Oscar Roberto Godói

February 24 Semifinals	São Paulo	1–3 (4–5 agg.)	Vasco da Gama	São Paulo
21:40 (UTC-3)	Warley 56'		Odvan 8'; Vágner 76'; Guilherme 77'	Stadium: Morumbi; Attendance: 30,910; Referee: Cláudio Vinícius Cerdeira

==== Record ====
Final Position	Points	Matches	Wins	Draws	Losses	Goals For	Goals Away	Win%
3rd	16	8	5	1	2	12	9	66%

=== Campeonato Paulista ===
March 6 Round 1	São Paulo	2–2	Guarani	São Paulo
00:00 (UTC-3)	Warley 33'; Dodô 86'		Gilson Batata 40', 44'	Stadium: Morumbi; Referee: Sidrack Marinho

March 14 Round 2	Corinthians	0–3	São Paulo	São Paulo
00:00 (UTC-3)			Marcelinho Paraíba 14', 73'; Serginho 86'	Stadium: Morumbi; Attendance: 37,232; Referee: Carlos Eugênio Simon

March 21 Round 3	São Paulo	5–1	Portuguesa Santista	São Paulo
00:00 (UTC-3)	França 59', 74'; Serginho 64'; Marcelinho Paraíba 69'; Dodô 87'		Claudio Milar 66'	Stadium: Morumbi; Attendance: 14,191; Referee: Silvio Talarico

March 24 Round 4	Santos	1–2	São Paulo	São Paulo
00:00 (UTC-3)	Gustavo Nery 31'		Marcelinho Paraíba 27'; Dodô 51'	Stadium: Pacaembu; Referee: Sidrack Marinho

March 27 Round 5	São Paulo	4–0	Mogi Mirim	São Paulo
00:00 (UTC-3)	Marcelinho Paraíba 4'; Bordon 57', 85'; Edmílson 62'			Stadium: Morumbi; Attendance: 14,483; Referee: Antônio Perin

April 4 Round 6	União Barbarense	1–2	São Paulo	Santa Bárbara d'Oeste
00:00 (UTC-3)	Élson 90'		França 43', 56'	Stadium: Antônio Guimarães; Attendance: 11,543; Referee: Sálvio Spínola

April 10 Round 7	Matonense	0–4	São Paulo	Matão
00:00 (UTC-3)			Warley 74', 81'; Wilson 75'; Dodô 89'	Stadium: Hudson Buck Pereira; Referee: Oswaldo Correa

April 18 Round 8	São Paulo	4–4	Palmeiras	São Paulo
00:00 (UTC-3)	Dodô 2', 45'; Serginho 22'; Rogério Ceni 82' (pen.)		Evair 15', 79'; Galeano 40', 72'	Stadium: Morumbi; Attendance: 31,045; Referee: Paulo César de Oliveira

April 21 Round 9	São Paulo	2–0	Portuguesa	São Paulo
00:00 (UTC-3)	Dodô 22'; Marcelinho Paraíba 86'			Stadium: Morumbi; Attendance: 23,707; Referee: Sávio Spínola

April 25 Round 10	Internacional	1–2	São Paulo	Limeira
00:00 (UTC-3)	Paulinho 90'		Rogério Ceni 57', 76'	Stadium: Major José Levy Sobrinho; Referee: Oscar Roberto Godói

May 1 Round 11	São Paulo	3–2	Rio Branco	São Paulo
00:00 (UTC-3)	Raí 11', 48'; Edmílson 56'		Sandro Hiroshi 12', 90'	Stadium: Morumbi; Attendance: 9,266; Referee: Vladimir Vassoler

May 4 Round 12	São Paulo	3–2	Matonense	São Paulo
00:00 (UTC-3)	Edu 66'; Warley 69'; França 81'		Juari 10', 41'	Stadium: Morumbi; Attendance: 48,421; Referee: Roberto Garbini Filho

May 9 Round 13	Palmeiras	1–5	São Paulo	São Paulo
00:00 (UTC-3)	Francisco Arce 8' (pen.)		Marcelinho Paraíba 6'; Serginho 50' (pen.), 60' (pen.), 87'; Edu 82'	Stadium: Morumbi; Referee: Paulo César de Oliveira

May 16 Round 14	Portuguesa	1–1	São Paulo	São Paulo
00:00 (UTC-3)	Emerson 37'		Raí 10'	Stadium: Canindé; Referee: Oscar Roberto Godói

May 22 Round 15	São Paulo	3–0	Internacional	São Paulo
00:00 (UTC-3)	Márcio Santos 52'; Serginho 70'; Dodô 88'			Stadium: Morumbi; Attendance: 41,811; Referee: Sálvio Spínola

May 30 Round 16	Rio Branco	2–1	São Paulo	Americana
00:00 (UTC-3)	Pena 25', 27'		Marcelinho Paraíba 42'	Stadium: Décio Vitta; Referee: Luiz Edmar Remondine

June 6 Semifinals	Corinthians	4–0	São Paulo	São Paulo
00:00 (UTC-3)	Ricardinho 12'; Dinei 64'; Marcelinho Carioca 74', 90' (pen.)			Stadium: Morumbi; Referee: Bernd Heynemann

June 9 Semifinals	São Paulo	1–1 (1–5 agg.)	Corinthians	São Paulo
00:00 (UTC-3)	Márcio Santos 3'		Edílson 47'	Stadium: Morumbi; Referee: Oscar Roberto Godói

==== Record ====
Final Position	Points	Matches	Wins	Draws	Losses	Goals For	Goals Away	Win%
3rd	40	18	12	4	2	47	23	74%

=== Copa do Brasil ===
February 18 Round of 64	CSA	0–4	São Paulo	Maceió
20:30 (UTC-3)		Report (pt)	Serginho 45', 83'; Reinaldo 86'; Marcelinho Paraíba 87'	Stadium: Estádio Rei Pelé; Referee: Édson Esperidião

March 10 Round of 32	Ypiranga	1–4	São Paulo	Macapá
20:30 (UTC-3)	Demir 52'	Report (pt)	Carlos Miguel 8'; Reinaldo 18'; Dodô 55'; França 84'	Stadium: Estádio Milton Corrêa (Zerão); Referee: Marco Antônio Barros Café

April 14 Round of 16	São Paulo	1–1	Botafogo	São Paulo
20:30 (UTC-3)	Warley 46'	Report (pt)	Alexandre Gallo 30'	Stadium: Estádio Cícero Pompeu de Toledo (Morumbi); Referee: Wilson de Souza Mendonça

April 28 Round of 16	Botafogo	3–1	São Paulo	Rio de Janeiro
20:30 (UTC-3)	Bebeto 34'; Leandro Eugênio 41'; Reidner 68'	Report (pt)	França 37'	Stadium: Estádio Jornalista Mário Filho (Maracanã); Referee: Carlos Eugênio Simon

==== Record ====
Final Position	Points	Matches	Wins	Draws	Losses	Goals For	Goals Away	Win%
14th	7	4	2	1	1	10	5	58%

=== Campeonato Brasileiro ===
July 25 Round 1	São Paulo	5–1	Atlético Mineiro	São Paulo
16:00 (UTC-3)	França 13'; Claudio Caçapa 27' (o.g.); Souza 53'; Emerson 72'; Marcelinho Paraíba 89'	Report (pt)	Wellington Amorim 87'	Stadium: Morumbi; Attendance: 10,519; Referee: Cláudio Vinícius Cerdeira

July 28 Round 2	Santos	3–2	São Paulo	Santos
21:40 (UTC-3)	Jean 14'; Ailton 47'; Dodô 83'	Report (pt)	França 12'; Emerson 54'	Stadium: Vila Belmiro; Attendance: 10,719

August 15 Round 4	Portuguesa	2–1	São Paulo	São Paulo
16:00 (UTC-3)	Carlinhos 24'; Da Silva 80'	Report (pt)	França 66'	Stadium: Canindé; Attendance: 10,661

August 18 Round 5	Cruzeiro	2–1	São Paulo	Belo Horizonte
21:40 (UTC-3)	Paulo Isidoro 21'; Ricardinho 85'	Report (pt)	Marcelinho Paraíba 64'	Stadium: Mineirão; Attendance: 9,267

August 22 Round 6	São Paulo	1–0	Botafogo-SP	São Paulo
17:00 (UTC-3)	Fabiano 72'	Report (pt)		Stadium: Morumbi; Attendance: 7,831

August 29 Round 7	Corinthians	1–0	São Paulo	São Paulo
16:00 (UTC-3)	Ricardinho 58'	Report (pt)		Stadium: Pacaembu; Attendance: 33,564

September 1 Round 8	Guarani	2–3	São Paulo	Campinas
21:40 (UTC-3)	Luiz Fernando 64'; Marcinho 86'	Report (pt)	França 21'; Souza 37'; Marcelinho Paraíba 62'	Stadium: Brinco de Ouro; Attendance: 11,555

September 4 Round 9	Grêmio	0–4	São Paulo	Porto Alegre
16:00 (UTC-3)		Report (pt)	França 14', 71'; Carlos Miguel 44'; Vágner 71'	Stadium: Olímpico; Attendance: 7,854; Referee: Luciano Augusto Teotônio Almeida

September 11 Round 10	São Paulo	2–1	Coritiba	São Paulo
18:30 (UTC-3)	Marcelinho Paraíba 40'; Márcio Santos 59'	Report (pt)	Léo Devanir 42'	Stadium: Morumbi; Attendance: 8,415

September 15 Round 11	Flamengo	1–0	São Paulo	Rio de Janeiro
21:40 (UTC-3)	Caio 74'	Report (pt)		Stadium: Maracanã; Attendance: 25,263

September 19 Round 12	São Paulo	2–0	Juventude	São Paulo
16:00 (UTC-3)	Marcelinho Paraíba 14'; França 27'	Report (pt)		Stadium: Morumbi; Attendance: 16,630

September 25 Round 13	São Paulo	1–2	Gama	São Paulo
18:30 (UTC-3)	Ânderson Lima 10'	Report (pt)	Alexandre Gaúcho 6'; Romualdo 71'	Stadium: Morumbi; Attendance: 14,639

September 29 Round 14	Vasco da Gama	1–2	São Paulo	Rio de Janeiro
21:40 (UTC-3)	Gilberto 77'	Report (pt)	Sandro Hiroshi 53'; França 67'	Stadium: Maracanã; Attendance: 21,417

October 3 Round 15	São Paulo	0–0	Palmeiras	São Paulo
17:00 (UTC-3)		Report (pt)		Stadium: Morumbi

October 14 Round 17	Atlético Paranaense	4–1	São Paulo	Curitiba
20:30 (UTC-3)	Lucas 44', 87'; Adriano Gabiru 53'; Kelly 65'	Report (pt)	Luizinho Neto 62' (o.g.)	Stadium: Arena da Baixada; Attendance: 24,780; Referee: Ubiraci Damásio de Oliveira

October 17 Round 18	São Paulo	4–1	Sport	São Paulo
17:00 (UTC-3)	França 6', 19', 67'; Carlos Miguel 11'	Report (pt)	Márcio Goiano 37'	Stadium: Morumbi; Attendance: 6,453

October 30 Round 19	Paraná	1–2	São Paulo	Curitiba
17:00 (UTC-3)	Washington 86'	Report (pt)	Wilson 58'; França 67'	Stadium: Pinheirão; Attendance: 15,711; Referee: Valdomiro Mathias Silva Filho

November 3 Round 20	São Paulo	1–0	Ponte Preta	São Paulo
20:30 (UTC-3)	Rogério Ceni 29'	Report (pt)		Stadium: Morumbi; Referee: Edílson Pereira de Carvalho

November 10 Round 21	Vitória	0–3	São Paulo	Salvador
21:40 (UTC-3)		Report (pt)	Raí 20'; Marcelinho Paraíba 43'; Jorginho 70'	Stadium: Barradão; Referee: Luciano Augusto Almeida

November 14 Quarterfinals	São Paulo	3–2	Ponte Preta	São Paulo
18:30 (UTC-3)	Marcelinho Paraíba 56', 62', 79'	Report (pt)	Claudinho 31'; Roberto 41'	Stadium: Morumbi; Attendance: 46,824; Referee: Sálvio Spínola Fagundes Filho

November 21 Quarterfinals	Ponte Preta	2–1	São Paulo	Campinas
18:30 (UTC-3)	Narcízio 73'; Adrianinho 89'	Report (pt)	Fábio Aurélio 66'	Stadium: Moisés Lucarelli; Attendance: 25,200; Referee: Romildo Corrêa

November 24 Quarterfinals	Ponte Preta	2–3	São Paulo	Campinas
21:40 (UTC-3)	Régis 13' (pen.); Luís Fabiano 37'	Report (pt)	Raí 33' (pen.); Wilson 42'; Edmílson 52'	Stadium: Moisés Lucarelli; Attendance: 21,588; Referee: Alfredo dos Santos Loebeling

November 28 Semifinals	São Paulo	2–3	Corinthians	São Paulo
18:30 (UTC-3)	Raí 29'; Edmílson 40'	Report (pt)	Nenê 23'; Ricardinho 31'; Marcelinho Carioca 53' (pen.)	Stadium: Morumbi; Attendance: 46,396; Referee: Edílson Pereira de Carvalho

December 5 Semifinals	Corinthians	2–1	São Paulo	São Paulo
18:30 (UTC-3)	Ricardinho 44'; Edílson 72'	Report (pt)	Vágner 70'	Stadium: Morumbi; Attendance: 50,949; Referee: Oscar Roberto Godói

==== Amended result by justice ====
Round 3

August 4 (match result)	São Paulo	6–1	Botafogo-RJ	São Paulo
21:40 (UTC-3)	França 23', 37', 43'; Souza 78'; Sandro Hiroshi 83'; Ânderson Lima 90'	Report (pt)	Valdir 72'	Stadium: Morumbi; Attendance: 2,687

August 4 (official result)	São Paulo	0–1	Botafogo-RJ	São Paulo
21:40 (UTC-3)			Goal	Stadium: Morumbi; Attendance: 2,687

Round 16

October 10 (match result)	São Paulo	2–2	Internacional	São Paulo
16:00 (UTC-3)	França 13'; Marcelinho Paraíba 55'	Report (pt)	Celso 5'; Hurtado 29'	Stadium: Morumbi; Attendance: 12,885; Referee: Cláudio Vinicius Cerdeira

October 10 (official result)	São Paulo	0–1	Internacional	São Paulo
16:00 (UTC-3)			Goal	Stadium: Morumbi; Attendance: 12,885; Referee: Cláudio Vinicius Cerdeira

- Sandro Hiroshi played in irregular condition

==== Record ====
Final Position	Points	Matches	Wins	Draws	Losses	Goals For	Goals Away	Win%
4th	40	26	13	1	12	45	35	51%

=== Copa Mercosur ===
July 31 Group C	Boca Juniors (Argentina)	5–1	(Brazil) São Paulo	Buenos Aires
00:00 (UTC-3)	Schelotto 3', 11', 28'; Ibarra 21'; Barijho 88'		Raí 25'	Stadium: Estadio Arquitecto Ricardo Etcheverry; Referee: Epifanio González

August 11 Group C	Universidad Católica (Chile)	0–3	(Brazil) São Paulo	Santiago
00:00 (UTC-3)			Wilson 23'; França 34'; Souza 85'	Stadium: Estadio San Carlos de Apoquindo; Referee: Olivier Vieira

August 25 Group C	São Paulo (Brazil)	4–1	(Argentina) San Lorenzo	São Paulo
00:00 (UTC-3)	Carlos Miguel 9'; Rogério Ceni 36'; França 59'; Marcelinho 76'		Romeo 83'	Stadium: Estádio do Morumbi; Referee: Carlos Amarilla

September 8 Group C	São Paulo (Brazil)	1–1	(Argentina) Boca Juniors	São Paulo
00:00 (UTC-3)	Márcio Santos 39'		Cagna 25'	Stadium: Estádio do Morumbi; Referee: Gustavo Gallesio

September 22 Group C	São Paulo (Brazil)	2–0	(Chile) Universidad Católica	São Paulo
00:00 (UTC-3)	França 24', 86'			Stadium: Estádio do Morumbi; Referee: Saul Feldman

October 7 Group C	San Lorenzo (Argentina)	1–0	(Brazil) São Paulo	Buenos Aires
00:00 (UTC-3)	Pusineri 44'			Stadium: El Nuevo Gasómetro; Attendance: 12,000; Referee: Robert Troxler

==== Record ====
Final Position	Points	Matches	Wins	Draws	Losses	Goals For	Goals Away	Win%
11th	10	6	3	1	2	11	8	55%

=== Copa Libertadores selective tournament ===
December 11 First leg	Atlético Paranaense (Brazil)	4–2	(Brazil) São Paulo	Curitiba
00:00 (UTC-3)	Adriano Gabiru 11', 51'; Gustavo 56'; Kelly 88'		Jacques 12'; Wilson 20'	Stadium: Estádio Couto Pereira; Referee: Márcio Rezende de Freitas

December 16 Second leg	São Paulo (Brazil)	2–1 (4–5 agg.)	(Brazil) Atlético Paranaense	São Paulo
00:00 (UTC-3)	França 66'; Leonardo 71' (o.g.)		Lucas 47'	Stadium: Estádio do Morumbi; Referee: Carlos Eugênio Simon

==== Record ====
Final Position	Points	Matches	Wins	Draws	Losses	Goals For	Goals Away	Win%
3rd	3	2	1	0	1	4	5	50%
