= 1996 São Paulo FC season =

São Paulo
1996 season
- Chairman: Fernando Casal de Rey
- Manager: Telê Santana (until January 30); Muricy Ramalho (until August 17); Carlos Alberto Parreira (until October 26); Muricy Ramalho
- Campeonato Brasileiro Série A: 11th
- Campeonato Paulista: Runners-up (in 1997 Copa do Brasil)
- Copa do Brasil: Round of 16
- Copa Masters CONMEBOL: Champions (1st title)
- Copa de Oro: Runners-up
- Supercopa Sudamericana: Preliminary round
- Top goalscorer: League: Müller (11); All: Valdir Bigode (31)

The 1996 season was São Paulo's 67th season since club's existence.

== Statistics ==
=== Scorers ===
Position	Nation	Playing position	Name	Campeonato Paulista	Copa Masters CONMEBOL	Copa do Brasil	Copa de Oro	Campeonato Brasileiro	Supercopa Sudamericana	Others	Total
1	(Brazil)	FW	Valdir	17	3	1	0	5	2	3	31
2	(Brazil)	FW	Almir	9	5	1	0	0	0	0	15
3	(Brazil)	FW	Müller	0	0	0	1	11	0	2	14
4	(Brazil)	FW	França	8	0	0	0	1	0	0	9
5	(Brazil)	MF	Denílson	3	0	0	0	3	0	2	8
6	(Brazil)	MF	Sandoval	5	0	2	0	0	0	0	7
=	(Colombia)	FW	Víctor Aristizábal	0	0	0	1	5	0	1	7
7	(Brazil)	FW	Adriano	0	0	0	1	2	0	1	4
=	(Brazil)	FW	Aílton	1	1	2	0	0	0	0	4
=	(Brazil)	DF	Bordon	1	0	1	0	1	0	1	4
=	(Brazil)	FW	Fábio Mello	1	0	0	0	3	0	0	4
=	(Brazil)	DF	Serginho	0	0	0	0	2	1	1	4
8	(Brazil)	MF	André Luiz	2	0	0	0	1	0	0	3
=	(Brazil)	DF	Edmílson	2	1	0	0	0	0	0	3
=	(Brazil)	DF	Pedro Luís	2	0	0	0	1	0	0	3
9	(Brazil)	MF	Djair	0	0	0	0	1	0	1	2
=	(Brazil)	DF	Guilherme	2	0	0	0	0	0	0	2
10	(Brazil)	DF	Belletti	0	0	0	0	1	0	0	1
=	(Brazil)	FW	Luciano	1	0	0	0	0	0	0	1
			Own goals	0	0	0	0	2	0	1	3
			Total	54	10	7	3	39	3	13	129

=== Overall ===
Games played	69 (30 Campeonato Paulista, 2 Copa Masters CONMEBOL, 3 Copa do Brasil, 2 Copa de Oro, 23 Campeonato Brasileiro, 2 Supercopa Libertadores, 7 Friendly match)
Games won	35 (16 Campeonato Paulista, 2 Copa Masters CONMEBOL, 2 Copa do Brasil, 1 Copa de Oro, 9 Campeonato Brasileiro, 1 Supercopa Libertadores, 4 Friendly match)
Games drawn	19 (7 Campeonato Paulista, 0 Copa Masters CONMEBOL, 1 Copa do Brasil, 0 Copa de Oro, 8 Campeonato Brasileiro, 0 Supercopa Libertadores, 3 Friendly match)
Games lost	15 (7 Campeonato Paulista, 0 Copa Masters CONMEBOL, 0 Copa do Brasil, 1 Copa de Oro, 6 Campeonato Brasileiro, 1 Supercopa Libertadores, 0 Friendly match)
Goals scored	130
Goals conceded	85
Goal difference	+45
Best result	7–3 (H) v Botafogo - Copa Masters CONMEBOL - 1996.02.08
Worst result	0–5 (H) v Corinthians - Campeonato Paulista - 1996.03.10
Most appearances	
Top scorer	Valdir Bigode (31)

Source: São Paulo FC

== Friendlies ==
June 15 International	São Paulo (Brazil)	3–0	(Spain) Real Madrid	São Paulo
	Müller 32'; Valdir Bigode 48'; Serginho 67'			Stadium: Estádio do Pacaembu; Attendance: 17,413; Referee: João Paulo Araújo

July 13 International	São Paulo (Brazil)	1–1	Denmark (U-21)	São Paulo
	Adriano 7'		Peter Degn 21'	Stadium: Estádio Cícero Pompeu de Toledo (Morumbi); Attendance: 18,221; Referee: João Paulo Araújo

December 3 International	Colo-Colo (Chile)	2–4	(Brazil) São Paulo	Santiago
	Goal		Denílson; Djair; Bordon; Aristizábal	Stadium: Monumental; Attendance: 10,000; Referee: Carlos Robles

=== Copa dos Campeões Mundiais ===
June 28 Group stage	Santos	1–1	São Paulo	Cuiabá
	Jamelli 9'		Müller 31'	Stadium: Estádio Verdão; Attendance: 6,779; Referee: Carlos Eugênio Simon

July 3 Group stage	Grêmio	0–3	São Paulo	Brasília
			Valdir Bigode 32'; Rivarola 39' (o.g.); Denílson 74'	Stadium: Estádio Mané Garrincha; Attendance: 7,305; Referee: Carlos Elias Pimentel

July 9 Group stage	Flamengo	0–0	São Paulo	Brasília
				Stadium: Estádio Mané Garrincha; Attendance: 33,181; Referee: Dacildo Mourão

July 18 Final	Flamengo	1–2	São Paulo	Brasília
	Romário 14'		Adriano 3'; Valdir Bigode 34'	Stadium: Estádio Mané Garrincha; Referee: Sidrack Marinho

== Official competitions ==
=== Campeonato Paulista ===
==== First round ====
Pos	Team	Pld	W	D	L	GF	GA	GD	Pts
3	Mogi Mirim	15	10	2	3	20	13	+7	32
4	Corinthians	15	8	4	3	37	17	+20	28
5	São Paulo	15	7	4	4	26	21	+5	25
6	União São João	15	6	5	4	25	19	+6	23
7	América	15	6	3	6	23	30	−7	21

Updated to match(es) played on 30 March 1996. Source: RSSSF.com
Rules for classification: 1) points; 2) wins; 3) goal difference; 4) number of goals scored.

===== Matches =====
January 27 1	Rio Branco	1–1	São Paulo	Americana
	Marcos Assunção 76'		Guilherme 82'	Stadium: Décio Vitta; Attendance: 4,431; Referee: Francisco Dacildo Mourão Albuquerque

January 31 2	São Paulo	3–0	XV de Jaú	São Paulo
	Almir 51'; Valdir Bigode 64', 87'			Stadium: Nicolau Alayon; Attendance: 2,437; Referee: Sálvio Spínola Fagundes Filho

February 3 3	Santos	1–2	São Paulo	Santos
	Giovanni 26'		Guilherme 31'; Almir 34'	Stadium: Vila Belmiro; Attendance: 12,984; Referee: Lincoln Afonso Bicalho

February 6 4	São Paulo	4–0	Guarani	São Paulo
	Valdir Bigode 2'; Aílton 38'; Sandoval 82'; Almir 83'			Stadium: Pacaembu; Attendance: 3,344; Referee: Dalmo Bozzano

February 10 5	América	2–3	São Paulo	São José do Rio Preto
	Adriano 55'; James 77'		Valdir Bigode 9'; Sandoval 69', 89'	Stadium: Teixeirão; Attendance: 27,585; Referee: Julio Matto

February 14 6	São Paulo	0–2	Palmeiras	São José do Rio Preto
			Djalminha 2'; Luizão 71'	Stadium: Teixeirão; Attendance: 28,791; Referee: José Mocellin

February 24 7	Botafogo	2–3	São Paulo	Ribeirão Preto
	Paulo César 52'; Ranielli 65'		Valdir Bigode 58', 89'; Bordon 80'	Stadium: Santa Cruz; Attendance: 9,914; Referee: Alfredo dos Santos Loebling

March 2 8	São Paulo	2–0	Araçatuba	Sorocaba
	Valdir Bigode 30'; Sandoval 64'			Stadium: Wálter Ribeiro; Attendance: 8,788; Referee: Flávio de Carvalho

March 7 9	União São João	2–2	São Paulo	Araras
	Luciano Baiano 5'; Valdo 45'		Almir 52'; Pedro Luís 90'	Stadium: Hermínio Ometto; Attendance: 1,253; Referee: Dionísio Roberto Domingos

March 10 10	São Paulo	0–5	Corinthians	Ribeirão Preto
			Souza 3'; Edmundo 36', 55'; Robson 84'; Henrique 90'	Stadium: Santa Cruz; Attendance: 17,394; Referee: Julio Matto

March 14 11	Ferroviária	1–1	São Paulo	Araraquara
	Juari 80'		Edmílson 76'	Stadium: Fonte Luminosa; Attendance: 3,041; Referee: Carlos Eugênio Simon

March 17 12	São Paulo	0–1	Portuguesa	Limeira
			Tico 59'	Stadium: José Levy Sobrinho; Attendance: 7,672; Referee: Sidrack Marinho dos Santos

March 21 13	Juventus	2–2	São Paulo	São Paulo
	Pedro Luís 37' (o.g.); Silva 82'		Luciano 58'; Denílson 90'	Stadium: Nicolau Alayon; Attendance: 626; Referee: José Mocellin

March 24 14	São Paulo	1–2	Mogi Mirim	Santo André
	Pedro Luís 87'		Moreno 16'; Leto 78'	Stadium: Bruno José Daniel; Attendance: 4,983; Referee: Carlos Elias Barros Pimentel

March 30 15	Novorizontino	0–2	São Paulo	Catanduva
			França 39', 60'	Stadium: José Alfredo Luís Jorge; Attendance: 2,704; Referee: Márcio Rezende de Freitas

==== Second round ====
Pos	Team	Pld	W	D	L	GF	GA	GD	Pts	Qualification or relegation
1	Palmeiras	15	13	1	1	41	11	+30	40	Qualified to finals
2	Santos	15	10	1	4	45	27	+18	31	
3	São Paulo	15	9	3	3	28	14	+14	30	
4	Botafogo	15	9	2	4	24	21	+3	29	
5	Guarani	15	7	4	4	17	14	+3	25	

Updated to match(es) played on 10 June 1996. Source: RSSSF.com
Rules for classification: 1) points; 2) wins; 3) goal difference; 4) number of goals scored.

===== Matches =====
April 6 16	São Paulo	3–1	Rio Branco	São Paulo
	Sandoval 67'; Almir 80'; França 87'		Nelson Bertolazzi 73'	Stadium: Pacaembu; Attendance: 3,459; Referee: Alfredo dos Santos Loebling

April 11 17	XV de Jaú	0–3	São Paulo	Jaú
			Valdir Bigode 67', 82', 85'	Stadium: Zezinho Magalhães; Attendance: 6,054; Referee: Cláudio Vinícius Cerdeira

April 14 18	São Paulo	2–1	Santos	São Paulo
	Almir 41', 72'		Giovanni 43'	Stadium: Pacaembu; Attendance: 27,000; Referee: Javier Castrilli

April 17 19	Guarani	0–1	São Paulo	Campinas
			Edmílson 79'	Stadium: Brinco de Ouro; Attendance: 10,273; Referee: Carlos Elias Barros Pimentel

April 20 20	São Paulo	1–3	América	São Paulo
	Valdir Bigode 24'		James 26'; Berg 38'; Ricardo Oliveira 87'	Stadium: Pacaembu; Attendance: 25,601; Referee: Francisco Dacildo Mourão Albuquerque

April 28 21	Palmeiras	3–2	São Paulo	Presidente Prudente
	Rivaldo 12'; Müller 38', 46'		Almir 44'; Valdir Bigode 66'	Stadium: Prudentão; Attendance: 35,182; Referee: Dermot Gallagher

May 1 22	São Paulo	1–0	Botafogo	São Paulo
	Almir 86'			Stadium: Pacaembu; Attendance: 3,749; Referee: Dalmo Bozzano

May 4 23	Araçatuba	2–1	São Paulo	Araçatuba
	Junior 19'; Jacques 62'		André Luiz 7'	Stadium: Adhemar de Barros; Attendance: 8,556; Referee: Alfredo dos Santos Loebling

May 8 24	São Paulo	3–0	União São João	São José dos Campos
	França 12', 52', 78'			Stadium: Martins Pereira; Attendance: 3,265; Referee: Edílson Pereira de Carvalho

May 12 25	Corinthians	0–0	São Paulo	São Paulo
				Stadium: Pacaembu; Attendance: 5,623; Referee: Epifanio González

May 15 26	São Paulo	2–0	Ferroviária	São José dos Campos
	Valdir Bigode 73'; André Luiz 76'			Stadium: Martins Ferreira; Attendance: 3,444; Referee: Antônio Cláudio Perin

May 19 27	Portuguesa	0–1	São Paulo	São Paulo
			Valdir Bigode 32'	Stadium: Canindé; Attendance: 3,819; Referee: Sálvio Spínola Fagundes Filho

May 21 28	São Paulo	5–1	Novorizontino	São Paulo
	Valdir Bigode 31', 55'; Fábio Mello 57'; Denílson 60'; França 68'		Ricardo 81'	Stadium: Canindé; Attendance: 950; Referee: Carlos Eugênio Simon

May 26 29	São Paulo	2–2	Juventus	São José dos Campos
	Valdir Bigode 10'; França 13'		Raudinei 54'; Anderson 75'	Stadium: Martins Pereira; Attendance: 7,134; Referee: Léo Feldman

June 1 30	Mogi Mirim	1–1	São Paulo	Mogi Mirim
	Valdo 18'		Denílson 90'	Stadium: Wilson Fernandes; Attendance: 2,066; Referee: Nelson Aparecido Sônego

==== Final standings ====
Pos	Team	Pld	W	D	L	GF	GA	GD	Pts	Qualification or relegation
1	Palmeiras	30	27	2	1	102	19	+83	83	Champions
2	São Paulo	30	16	7	7	54	35	+19	55	
3	Portuguesa	30	14	11	5	53	30	+23	53	
4	Corinthians	30	14	10	6	58	31	+27	52	
5	Santos	30	16	3	11	69	54	+15	51	

Updated to match(es) played on 10 June 1996. Source: RSSSF.com
Rules for classification: 1) points; 2) wins; 3) goal difference; 4) number of goals scored.

==== Record ====
Final Position	Points	Matches	Wins	Draws	Losses	Goals For	Goals Away	Win%
2nd	55	30	16	7	7	54	35	61%

=== Copa Masters CONMEBOL ===
February 8	São Paulo (Brazil)	7–3	(Brazil) Botafogo	Cuiabá
	Valdir Bigode 6', 38'; Almir 12', 31', 55'; Ailton 72'; Edmílson 73'		Túlio 33', 48' (pen.), 52' (pen.)	Stadium: Verdão; Referee: Sidrack Marinho dos Santos

February 12	São Paulo (Brazil)	3–0	(Brazil) Atlético Mineiro	Cuiabá
	Almir 9', 51'; Valdir Bigode 68'			Stadium: Verdão; Referee: Sidrack Marinho dos Santos

==== Record ====
Final Position	Points	Matches	Wins	Draws	Losses	Goals For	Goals Away	Win%
1st	6	2	2	0	0	10	3	100%

=== Copa do Brasil ===
==== Round of 32 ====
March 12	América	1–2	São Paulo	Belo Horizonte
	Cláudio 88'		Aílton 14', 28'	Stadium: Independência; Attendance: 3,992; Referee: Fabiano Gonçalves

March 19	São Paulo	4–1	América	São Paulo
	Valdir Bigode 5'; Sandoval 7', 17'; Taú (og) 62'		Cláudio 60'	Stadium: Pacaembu; Attendance: 313; Referee: Antônio Pereira da Silva

==== Eightfinals ====
April 2	Internacional	1–1	São Paulo	Porto Alegre
	Leandro 86'		Bordon 40'	Stadium: Beira-Rio; Attendance: 17,042; Referee: Márcio Rezende de Freitas

==== Record ====
Final Position	Points	Matches	Wins	Draws	Losses	Goals For	Goals Away	Win%
10th	7	3	2	1	0	7	3	77%

=== Copa de Oro ===
August 14 Semifinal	Grêmio (Brazil)	1–2	(Brazil) São Paulo	Manaus
	Emerson 63'		Adriano 52'; Müller 59'	Stadium: Vivaldão

August 16 Final	Flamengo (Brazil)	3–1	(Brazil) São Paulo	Manaus
	Sávio 16' (pen.), 57', 82'		Aristizábal 68'	Stadium: Vivaldão

==== Record ====
Final Position	Points	Matches	Wins	Draws	Losses	Goals For	Goals Away	Win%
2nd	3	2	1	0	1	3	4	50%

=== Campeonato Brasileiro ===
==== First stage ====
Pos	Team	Pld	W	D	L	GF	GA	GD	Pts
9	Internacional	23	10	5	8	31	27	+4	35
10	Sport	23	10	5	8	32	31	+1	35
11	São Paulo	23	9	8	6	39	32	+7	35
12	Corinthians	23	7	11	5	20	19	+1	32
13	Flamengo	23	9	3	11	24	31	−7	30

===== Matches =====
August 8 2*	São Paulo	2–1	Portuguesa	São Paulo
	Müller 18'; Jorginho 20' (o.g.)		Rodrigo Fabri 80'	Stadium: Morumbi; Attendance: 7,573; Referee: Cláudio Vinícius Cerdeira

August 18 3	São Paulo	5–2	Bahia	São Paulo
	Pedro Luís 24'; Müller 45'; André Luiz 64'; Aristizábal 78', 90'		Bobô 42', 49'	Stadium: Morumbi; Attendance: 8,909; Referee: Getúlio Barbosa Souza Lima Junior

August 22 4	Botafogo	1–1	São Paulo	Niterói
	Túlio 49'		Müller 69'	Stadium: Caio Martins; Attendance: 3,535; Referee: Antônio Pereira da Silva

August 24 5	São Paulo	2–1	Santos	São Paulo
	Müller 56'; Serginho 77'		Ânderson Lima 50'	Stadium: Morumbi; Attendance: 9,520; Referee: João Paulo Araújo

August 28 6	Fluminense	1–1	São Paulo	Rio de Janeiro
	Valdeir 54'		Fábio Mello 45'	Stadium: Laranjeiras; Attendance: 3,774; Referee: Francisco Dacildo Mourão Albuquerque

September 1 7	São Paulo	1–0	Goiás	São Paulo
	Adriano 68'			Stadium: Morumbi; Attendance: 7,292; Referee: Carlos Elias Barros Pimentel

September 4 8	São Paulo	0–1	Guarani	São Paulo
			Aílton 26'	Stadium: Morumbi; Attendance: 4,953; Referee: Flávio de Carvalho

September 7 9	Coritiba	1–1	São Paulo	Curitiba
	Pachequinho 35'		França 80'	Stadium: Couto Pereira; Attendance: 16,534; Referee: Carlos Eugênio Simon

September 15 10	Internacional	1–0	São Paulo	Porto Alegre
	Leandro 53'			Stadium: Beira-Rio; Attendance: 6,376; Referee: Márcio Rezende de Freitas

September 21 11	São Paulo	1–1	Vasco da Gama	São Paulo
	Aristizábal 71'		Edmundo 50'	Stadium: Morumbi; Attendance: 8,298; Referee: Francisco Dacildo Mourão Albuquerque

September 29 12	Palmeiras	2–1	São Paulo	São Paulo
	Rincón 20'; Djalminha 89'		Aristizábal 75'	Stadium: Parque Antarctica; Attendance: 8,594; Referee: Léo Feldman

October 2 1*	São Paulo	4–1	Flamengo	São Paulo
	Serginho 20'; Márcio Costa 31' (o.g.); Bordon 33'; Valdir Bigode 77'		Bebeto 84'	Stadium: Morumbi; Attendance: 11.067; Referee: Sidrack Marinho dos Santos

October 5 13	Sport	2–1	São Paulo	Recife
	Luiz Müller 5'; Joãozinho 75'		Fábio Mello 17'	Stadium: Ilha do Retiro; Attendance: 23,191; Referee: Antônio Pereira da Silva

October 9 14	São Paulo	3–3	Atlético Paranaense	São Paulo
	Müller 2'; Denílson 20'; Fábio Mello 31'		Luis Carlos 28', 53'; Paulo Rink 46'	Stadium: Morumbi; Attendance: 3,866; Referee: Carlos Eugênio Simon

October 13 15	Atlético Mineiro	2–1	São Paulo	Belo Horizonte
	Euller 76'; Renaldo 90'		Valdir Bigode 1'	Stadium: Mineirão; Attendance: 44,676; Referee: Carlos Jacques Rodrigues Magno

October 20 16	São Paulo	0–0	Corinthians	São Paulo
				Stadium: Morumbi; Attendance: 11,624; Referee: Sidrack Marinho dos Santos

October 26 17	Vitória	2–0	São Paulo	Salvador
	Rubem 46'; Agnaldo 68'			Stadium: Barradão; Attendance: 10,293; Referee: Dalmo Bozzano

November 3 18	São Paulo	5–3	Criciúma	São Paulo
	Belletti 8'; Müller 15'; Denílson 58'; Valdir Bigode 62'; Adriano 65'		Mabília 64'; Marcão 68'; Eraldo 85'	Stadium: Morumbi; Attendance: 3,891; Referee: Antônio Pereira da Silva

November 6 19	Juventude	2–2	São Paulo	Caxias do Sul
	Itaqui 25'; Dedimar 69'		Denílson 12'; Müller 38'	Stadium: Alfredo Jaconi; Attendance: 2,587; Referee: Carlos Elias Barros Pimentel

November 9 20	São Paulo	2–1	Grêmio	São Paulo
	Valdir Bigode 60'; Aristizábal 71'		Paulo Nunes 30'	Stadium: Morumbi; Attendance: 5,053; Referee: Antônio Pereira da Silva

November 16 21	Bragantino	3–4	São Paulo	Bragança Paulista
	Alex 35'; Márcio 53'; Edílson 76'		Djair 2'; Müller 33', 45'; Valdir Bigode 61'	Stadium: Marcelo Stéfani; Attendance: 2,597; Referee: Márcio Rezende de Freitas

November 21 22	São Paulo	1–0	Cruzeiro	São Paulo
	Müller 11'			Stadium: Morumbi; Attendance: 7,926; Referee: Carlos Jacques Rodrigues Magno

November 24 23	Paraná	1–1	São Paulo	Curitiba
	Claudinho 54'		Müller 56'	Stadium: Durival de Britto; Attendance: 7,882; Referee: Cláudio Vinícius Cerdeira

==== Record ====
Final Position	Points	Matches	Wins	Draws	Losses	Goals For	Goals Away	Win%
11th	35	23	9	8	6	39	32	50%

=== Supercopa Sudamericana ===
September 12	Olimpia (Paraguay)	2–1	(Brazil) São Paulo	Asunción
	Fernando Silvera 41'; Torres 73'		Valdir Bigode 76'	Stadium: Estadio Manuel Ferreira; Attendance: 8,525; Referee: Javier Castrilli

September 19	São Paulo (Brazil)	2–1 (3–5 p)	(Paraguay) Olimpia	São Paulo
	Valdir Bigode 47'; Serginho 86'		Samaniego 88'	Stadium: Estádio do Morumbi; Attendance: 3,083; Referee: Luís da Rosa

==== Record ====
Final Position	Points	Matches	Wins	Draws	Losses	Goals For	Goals Away	Win%
11th	3	2	1	0	1	3	3	50%
