= Reginaldo Cachorrão =

Brazilian footballer

Reginaldo
Personal information
- Full name: Reginaldo Henrique Sossai
- Date of birth: 21 December 1971 (age 54)
- Place of birth: São Jorge do Ivaí, Brazil
- Position: Centre-back

Senior career*
Years	Team	Apps	(Gls)
1992–2002	Atlético Paranaense		
1994	→ Guarani (loan)		
2001–2002	→ São Paulo (loan)	28	(3)
2003–2004	Beijing Hyundai		
2004–2005	Bahia		
- * Club domestic league appearances and goals as of 30 August 2023

Reginaldo Henrique Sossai (born 21 December 1971), also known as Reginaldo Cachorrão or simply Reginaldo, is a Brazilian former professional footballer who played as a centre-back.

== Honours ==
=== Athletico Paranaense ===
- Campeonato Brasileiro Série B: 1995
- Campeonato Paranaense: 1998, 2000

=== São Paulo ===
- Torneio Rio-São Paulo: 2001
- Supercampeonato Paulista: 2002
