= Renatinho (footballer, born 1981) =

Brazilian footballer

Personal information
- Full name: Renato de Cássio Negrão
- Date of birth: 12 March 1981 (age 45)
- Place of birth: Poços de Caldas, Brazil
- Height: 1.64 m (5 ft 5 in)
- Position: Forward

Team information
- Current team: Ceará (assistant)

Youth career
- –2001: São Paulo

Senior career*
Years	Team	Apps	(Gls)
2001–2002	São Paulo	4	(2)
2001	→ Santa Cruz (loan)	4	(1)
2002	→ São Caetano (loan)		
2003	→ Fluminense (loan)	5	(0)
2003	→ Juventude (loan)	6	(1)
2004–2006	Tombense		
2004	→ Lokeren	13	(3)
2005	→ Paulista (loan)	1	(0)
2007	Rio Branco de Andradas		
2007	Uberaba		
2008–2009	Poços de Caldas		
2008	→ Anápolis (loan)	3	(0)
2008	→ Ceará (loan)	0	(0)
2009	Sendas		
2010	Pão de Açúcar	16	(2)
2011	Rio Branco-SP	5	(0)
2011	Santa Helena	6	(1)
2011–2012	Caldense	7	(1)

Managerial career
- 2013–2015: Caldense (assistant)
- 2015: Sampaio Corrêa (assistant)
- 2016: Bragantino (assistant)
- 2016: Goiás (assistant)
- 2017: CRB (assistant)
- 2018–2019: Botafogo-SP (assistant)
- 2019: Paysandu (assistant)
- 2020: São Bento (assistant)
- 2020–2021: Sampaio Corrêa (assistant)
- 2021–2022: Novorizontino (assistant)
- 2022: Sampaio Corrêa (assistant)
- 2023–2024: Vitória (assistant)
- 2024–: Ceará (assistant)
- * Club domestic league appearances and goals

Renato de Cássio Negrão (born 12 March 1981), commonly known as Renatinho, is a Brazilian football coach and former player who played as a forward. He is the current assistant coach of Ceará.

== Career ==
Emerged as a great highlight of the youth categories of São Paulo, alongside names like Kaká, he made few games for the main category, leaving later for other teams. At just 1.64 m tall, Renatinho claims that his height was the biggest obstacle for his career to gear up in more prominent centres. Retired at just 31 years old, and after that, he became Léo Condé's technical assistant at Caldense.

== Honours ==
São Paulo

- Copa São Paulo de Futebol Júnior: 2000
- Torneio Rio-São Paulo: 2001

Paulista

- Copa do Brasil: 2005
