= 1999 Campeonato Brasileiro Série A =

Campeonato Brasileiro Série A
- Season: 1999
- Champions: Corinthians (3rd title)
- Relegated: Botafogo-SP; Juventude; Paraná; Gama
- Copa Libertadores: Coritnhians; Atlético Mineiro; Palmeiras (title holders); Juventude (via Copa do Brasil); Atlético Paranaense (via playoff qualifier)
- Matches: 250
- Goals: 710 (2.84 per match)
- Top goalscorer: Guilherme (28 goals)

The 1999 Campeonato Brasileiro Série A was the 43rd edition of the Campeonato Brasileiro Série A, the top-level of professional football in Brazil.

== Overview ==
It was contested by 22 teams, and Corinthians won the championship.

== First phase ==
Pos	Team	Pld	W	D	L	GF	GA	GD	Pts	Qualification
1	Corinthians	21	14	2	5	49	31	+18	44	Championship knockout phase
2	Cruzeiro	21	12	6	3	46	32	+14	42	Championship knockout phase
3	Vasco da Gama	21	10	6	5	33	23	+10	36	Championship knockout phase
4	Ponte Preta	21	10	5	6	23	16	+7	35	Championship knockout phase
5	São Paulo	21	11	1	9	35	24	+11	34 (Note: CBF awarded Botafogo and Internacional 1–0 away wins due to São Paulo footballer Sandro Hiroshi gate. Originally São Paulo had defeated Botafogo 6–1 home and drawn 2–2 home with Internacional.)	Championship knockout phase
6	Vitória	21	10	4	7	31	33	−2	34	Championship knockout phase
7	Atlético Mineiro	21	10	3	8	39	30	+9	33	Championship knockout phase
8	Guarani	21	10	3	8	31	22	+9	33	Championship knockout phase
9	Atlético Paranaense	21	9	4	8	36	31	+5	31	
10	Palmeiras	21	8	7	6	36	23	+13	31	
11	Santos	21	8	6	7	25	26	−1	30	
12	Flamengo	21	9	2	10	30	33	−3	29	
13	Coritiba	21	7	8	6	31	29	+2	29	
14	Botafogo	21	8	2	11	23	37	−14	26	
15	Gama	21	7	5	9	24	29	−5	26	
16	Internacional	21	7	3	11	18	26	−8	24	
17	Paraná	21	6	6	9	23	29	−6	24	
18	Grêmio	21	6	4	11	24	43	−19	22	
19	Juventude	21	5	7	9	18	32	−14	22	
20	Botafogo (Ribeirão Preto)	21	5	6	10	27	38	−11	21	
21	Portuguesa	21	4	6	11	27	31	−4	18	
22	Sport do Recife	21	3	8	10	14	25	−11	17	

Source: RSSSF
Rules for classification: 1) points; 2) goal difference; 3) number of goals scored.

== Championship knockout phase ==
=== Quarterfinals ===
Teams			Scores			
Team 1	Points	Team 2	1st leg	2nd leg	Replay	Agg.
Corinthians (São Paulo (state))	4–2	(São Paulo (state)) Guarani	0–0	2–0	1–1	3–1
Ponte Preta (São Paulo (state))	3–6	(São Paulo (state)) São Paulo	2–3	2–1	2–3	6–7
Vasco (Rio de Janeiro (state))	2–5	(Bahia) Vitória	4–5	2–2	1–1	7–8
Cruzeiro (Minas Gerais)	0–6	(Minas Gerais) Atlético Mineiro	2–4	2–3	Not played	4–7

=== Semifinals ===
Teams			Scores			
Team 1	Points	Team 2	1st leg	2nd leg	Replay	Agg.
Corinthians (São Paulo (state))	6–0	(São Paulo (state)) São Paulo	3–2	2–1	Not played	5–3
Vitória (Bahia)	3–6	(Minas Gerais) Atlético Mineiro	0–3	2–1	0–3	2–7

== Finals ==
=== First leg ===
12 December 1999
19:10 (UTC-3)

Atlético Mineiro (Minas Gerais)	3 – 2	(São Paulo (state)) Corinthians
Guilherme 0', 27', 44'		39' Vampeta; 69' Luizão

Mineirão, Belo Horizonte
Attendance: 78,382
Referee: (São Paulo (state)) Oscar Roberto Godói

=== Second leg ===
19 December 1999
18:10 (UTC-3)

Corinthians (São Paulo (state))	2 – 0	(Minas Gerais) Atlético Mineiro
Luizão 28', 59' 90+3'

Morumbi, São Paulo
Attendance: Unknown
Referee: (Minas Gerais) Márcio Rezende de Freitas

=== Replay ===
22 December 1999
21:40 (UTC-3)

Corinthians (São Paulo (state))	0 – 0	(Minas Gerais) Atlético Mineiro
		83' Belletti

Morumbi, São Paulo
Attendance: Unknown
Referee: (Rio Grande do Sul) Carlos Eugênio Simon

Tied 4–4 on points, Corinthians won 4–3 on aggregate.

== Final standings ==
Pos	Team	Pld	W	D	L	GF	GA	GD	Pts	
1	Corinthians	29	18	5	6	61	38	+23	59	Qualified to 2000 Copa Libertadores
2	Atlético Mineiro	29	15	4	10	56	40	+16	49	Qualified to 2000 Copa Libertadores
3	Vitória	27	12	6	9	41	47	−6	42	
4	São Paulo	26	13	1	12	45	35	+10	40	
5	Cruzeiro	23	12	6	5	50	39	+11	42	
6	Ponte Preta	24	11	5	8	29	23	+6	38	
7	Vasco da Gama	24	10	8	6	40	31	+9	38	
8	Guarani	24	10	5	9	32	25	+7	35	
9	Atlético Paranaense	21	9	4	8	36	31	+5	31	Qualified to 2000 Copa Libertadores
10	Palmeiras	21	8	7	6	36	23	+13	31	Qualified to 2000 Copa Libertadores
11	Santos	21	8	6	7	25	26	−1	30	
12	Flamengo	21	9	2	10	30	33	−3	29	
13	Coritiba	21	7	8	6	31	29	+2	29	
14	Botafogo	21	8	2	11	23	37	−14	26	
15	Gama	21	7	5	9	24	29	−5	26	Relegated to Série B
16	Internacional	21	7	3	11	18	26	−8	24	
17	Paraná	21	6	6	9	23	29	−6	24	Relegated to Série B
18	Grêmio	21	6	4	11	24	43	−19	22	
19	Juventude	21	5	7	9	18	32	−14	22	Relegated to Série B
20	Botafogo-SP	21	5	6	10	27	38	−11	21	Relegated to Série B
21	Portuguesa	21	4	6	11	27	31	−4	18	
22	Sport	21	3	8	10	14	25	−11	17	

== Top scorers ==
Pos.	Scorer	Club	Goals
1	(Brazil) Guilherme	Atlético Mineiro	28
2	(Brazil) Alex Alves	Cruzeiro	21
2	(Brazil) Luizão	Corinthians	21
3	(Brazil) Marcelinho Carioca	Corinthians	15
4	(Brazil) Edmundo	Vasco	13
4	(Brazil) Dodô	Santos	13
5	(Brazil) França	São Paulo	12
5	(Brazil) Romário	Flamengo	12

== Copa Libertadores playoff qualifier ==
=== Preliminary Stage ===
Teams			Results	
Team 1	Points	Team 2	1st leg	2nd leg
Sport Recife	3–4	Portuguesa	3–1	0–3

=== First Stage ===
Teams			Results	
Team 1	Points	Team 2	1st leg	2nd leg
Internacional	2–1	Flamengo	1–0	1–1
Grêmio	3–1	Santos	2–1	1–0
Botafogo	2–4	Coritiba	1–1	1–3
Portuguesa	3–3	Atlético Paranaense	3–1	0–2

=== Second Stage ===
Teams			Results	
Team 1	Points	Team 2	1st leg	2nd leg
Grêmio	2–2	Internacional	1–1	1–1
Coritiba	3–5	Atlético Paranaense	1–4	2–1
Ponte Preta	4–4	Vasco da Gama	3–2	1–2
Guarani	3–4	Cruzeiro	3–1	0–3

=== Third Phase ===
Teams			Results	
Team 1	Points	Team 2	1st leg	2nd leg
Internacional	2–3	Atlético Paranaense	1–1	1–2
Vasco da Gama	5–5	Cruzeiro	3–1	2–4

=== Semifinals ===
Teams			Results	
Team 1	Points	Team 2	1st leg	2nd leg
Atlético Paranaense	5–4	São Paulo	4–2	1–2
Cruzeiro	5–2	Vitória	3–1	2–1

=== Finals ===
Teams			Results	
Team 1	Points	Team 2	1st leg	2nd leg
Atlético Paranaense	4–2	Cruzeiro	3–0	1–2

== Relegation ==
The criterion for relegation to the Série B in 1999 was the average of points obtained in 1999 and 1998. The four teams with the smallest averages would be relegated. The CBF-defined formula for the point average (PA) was:

PA = ( (P98/23) + (P99/21) ) / 2

P98 being the number of points in 1998 and P99 the number of points in 1999.

As to Gama and Botafogo-SP, that had ascended from the Série B and as such, didn't dispute the 1998 Série A, the formula was reduced to:

PA = P99/21

Originally, the six worst point averages were:

1. Gama: 1,238
2. Internacional: 1,219
3. Botafogo: 1,178
4. Paraná: 1,093
5. Juventude: 1,089
6. Botafogo-SP: 1,000

Which would mean that Botafogo, Paraná, Juventude and Botafogo-SP would be relegated. However, the matches of São Paulo against Internacional and Botafogo were annulled and the points gained by São Paulo in both matches (three against Botafogo, one against Internacional) were given to both clubs, due to the fielding of the ineligible player Sandro Hiroshi in both matches. So, the six worst point averages became:

1. Internacional: 1,267
2. Botafogo: 1,249
3. Gama: 1,238
4. Paraná: 1,093
5. Juventude: 1,089
6. Botafogo-SP: 1,000

This meant that Botafogo escaped relegation and Gama joined Botafogo-SP, Juventude and Paraná in the Série B in 2000.

Gama did not accept this decision and appealed. The judicial disputes lasted months and CBF was stopped from organizing the 2000 Campeonato Brasileiro. The Clube dos 13 assumed the organization of the championship as Copa João Havelange, with the participation of 116 teams divided into 3 groups.

Pos	Team	1998 Pts	1999 Pts	Total Pts	Total Pld	Avg	Relegation
1	Corinthians	46	44	90	44	2.045	
2	Cruzeiro	37	42	79	44	1.795	
3	Palmeiras	45	31	76	44	1.727	
4	Santos	41	30	71	44	1.614	
5	Coritiba	42	29	71	44	1.614	
6	Vasco da Gama	34	36	70	44	1.591	
7	Atlético Mineiro	36	33	69	44	1.568	
8	Vitória	30	34	64	44	1.455	
9	Flamengo	33	29	62	44	1.409	
10	Ponte Preta	26	35	61	44	1.386	
11	São Paulo	27	34	61	44	1.386	
12	Guarani	25	33	58	44	1.318	
13	Atlético Paranaense	27	31	58	44	1.318	
14	Grêmio	36	22	58	44	1.318	
15	Portuguesa	40	18	58	44	1.318	
16	Sport do Recife	40	17	57	44	1.295	
17	Internacional	32	24	56	44	1.273	
18	Botafogo	29	26	55	44	1.25	
19	Gama	—	26	26	21	1.238	2000 Brasileirão Série B
20	Paraná	24	24	48	44	1.091	2000 Brasileirão Série B
21	Juventude	26	22	48	44	1.091	2000 Brasileirão Série B
22	Botafogo (Ribeirão Preto)	—	21	21	21	1	2000 Brasileirão Série B
