= Luís Fabiano =

Brazilian footballer (born 1980)

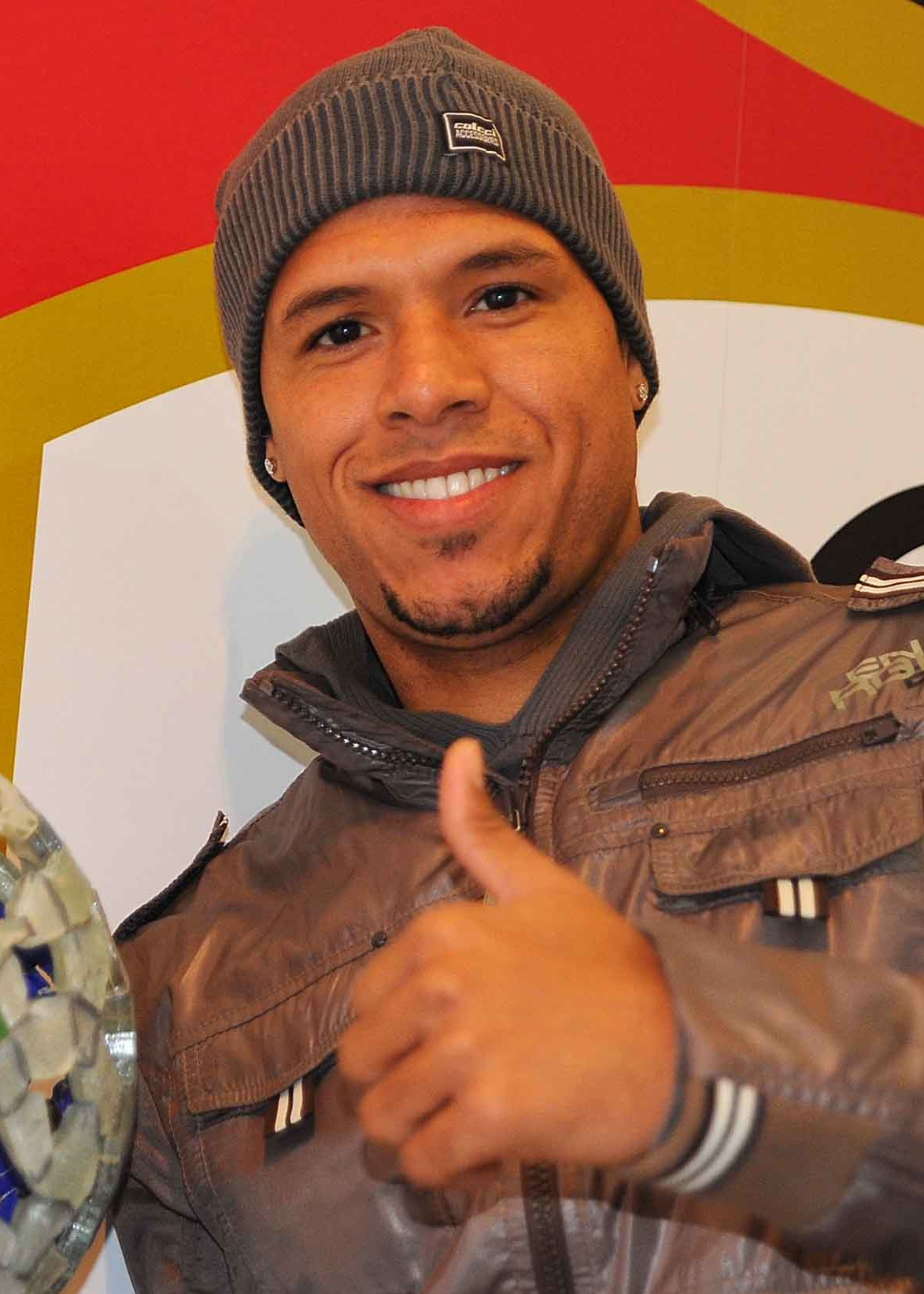
- Fabiano in 2010

Personal information
- Full name: Luís Fabiano Clemente
- Date of birth: 8 November 1980 (age 46)
- Place of birth: Jundiaí, Brazil
- Height: 1.85 m (6 ft 1 in)
- Position: Striker

Youth career
- Ponte Preta

Senior career*
Years	Team	Apps	(Gls)
1998–2000	Ponte Preta	12	(3)
2000–2002	Rennes	11	(0)
2001	→ São Paulo (loan)	22	(9)
2002–2004	São Paulo	65	(54)
2004–2005	Porto	22	(3)
2005–2011	Sevilla	149	(72)
2011–2015	São Paulo	101	(46)
2016	Tianjin Quanjian	28	(22)
2017	Vasco da Gama	12	(5)
Total		422	(214)

International career
2003–2013	Brazil	45	(28)
Medal record
Men's Football
Representing Brazil
FIFA Confederations Cup
Winner	2009 South Africa
Copa América
Winner	2004 Peru
- * Club domestic league appearances and goals

Luís Fabiano Clemente (born 8 November 1980), commonly known as Luís Fabiano, is a Brazilian former professional footballer who played as a striker and represented the Brazil national team.

Luís Fabiano began his career with Ponte Preta in Brazil in 1998, followed by a short spell with Rennes in France. He returned to Brazil with São Paulo, where he was top scorer in the 2002 Brazilian league and the 2004 Copa Libertadores. He returned to Europe in 2004, spending one season with Porto, before joining Spanish club Sevilla in Spain, where he would spend six seasons. With Sevilla, he won consecutive UEFA Cups in 2006 and 2007, as well as the Copa del Rey twice, scoring 106 goals in 229 matches. He returned to São Paulo in 2011, spending four and half seasons there and winning the 2012 Copa Sudamericana. He subsequently joined Tianjin Quanjian in China for one season. After a short spell with Vasco da Gama, he retired from professional football in 2017.

Luís Fabiano made his debut for the Brazil national team in 2003, representing Brazil at the 2010 World Cup, as well as the 2004 Copa América, which Brazil won. He also appeared at the 2003 and 2009 Confederations Cups, winning the latter, where he was also the tournament top-scorer. He played 45 matches and scored 28 times for Brazil between 2003 and 2013.

== Club career ==
=== Early career ===
Luís Fabiano enjoyed great success during two spells with Brazilian side São Paulo, with a disappointing period at French side Rennes sandwiched in between. His strength on the ball, accurate finishing and pace made him a vital part of the side that fell in the semi-finals of the 2004 Copa Libertadores de América.

Luís Fabiano was labeled the "bad boy" of Brazilian football when playing for São Paulo after a number of brawls. During a 2003 Copa Sudamericana match for São Paulo against River Plate of Argentina, a fight between the players broke out. Luís Fabiano ran behind a River player and kicked him just below the neck. While being escorted off the field, Luís Fabiano said that he "would rather fight than take a penalty". He was given a three-match ban from all competitions.

=== Porto ===
Luís Fabiano moved to Portugal to play for Porto in 2004 for a €1.875 million transfer fee; Porto, however, only bought 25% of his rights, the other 75% belonging to Global Soccer Investments (later renamed to Rio Football Services). At Porto, Luís Fabiano was reunited with his international teammate Diego, who he played with on the Brazil squad at the 2004 Copa América. Luís Fabiano had a troublesome season, however, scoring only three goals in 22 matches. This led to him being transferred to La Liga side Sevilla.

Sevilla signed 25% economic right from Porto and later signed a further 10% from Rio Football Services for €1.2 million, with a pre-set price of remains 65% rights for €7.15 million to be excised on or before 15 April 2007, although it was never excised. Moreover, Sevilla had to pay Rio Football Services €450,000 annually. Eventually, the third parties ownership had brought to the court.

=== Sevilla ===
Luís Fabiano transferred to Sevilla ahead of the 2005–06 season, replacing his compatriot and former São Paulo teammate Júlio Baptista, who in turn had just become a Real Madrid player. On 10 May 2006, Luís Fabiano scored a header during Sevilla's 4–0 victory over Middlesbrough in the UEFA Cup Final. The success continued in the 2007–08 season, as Luís Fabiano finished runner-up in the Pichichi Trophy with 24 goals (including two from the penalty spot), second only to Daniel Güiza's 27 goals. This led to Luís Fabiano being recalled to the Brazilian Seleção. On 29 November, Luís Fabiano was sent off for elbowing Barcelona's Sergio Busquets. He had to be restrained by the Sevilla staff. In 2008, Luís Fabiano extended his contract with Sevilla to 2011.

On 4 July 2009, according to Luís Fabiano's agent, Milan made an official offer for him, with Luís Fabiano reportedly pleading with his club Sevilla to allow him to make the switch to the San Siro. The deal, however, did not go through.

On 30 August 2010, Luís Fabiano put an end to the speculation with a move away from Sevilla by signing a contract extension until 2013. On the renewal, he stated his intentions: "This is my home, I've been here six seasons and I will try to continue scoring goals and continue making history for Sevilla."

=== Return to São Paulo ===
On 13 March 2011, Luís Fabiano returned to Brazil to rejoin São Paulo. The Brazilian club paid €7.6 million for the striker, who signed a four-year deal. He was welcomed by 45,000 fans at his presentation at the Estádio do Morumbi. On 29 July 2012, playing against Flamengo, Luís Fabiano scored two goals and thus became the seventh-most prolific goalscorer of São Paulo's history, outscoring Leônidas.

On 26 August 2012, Luís Fabiano scored twice in São Paulo's 2–1 win over Corinthians. In 2013, however, after a year in which he was injured or had been out of form, Luís Fabiano was charged by Muricy Ramalho, then the coach of club. According to Ramalho, using Ganso (who recovered his good shape) as an example, Ramalho stated Luís Fabiano needs "wanting more".

In December 2015, he was released from São Paulo and joined Chinese club Tianjin Quanjian as a free agent.

In February 2017, he returned to Brazil and signed for Vasco da Gama.

== International career ==
Luís Fabiano made his debut for Brazil on 11 June 2003 in a friendly against Nigeria, marking his international debut with a goal before being substituted. He was also included in Brazil's squad for 2003 FIFA Confederations Cup, but did not make any appearances.

He won the 2004 Copa América with Brazil, where he started in all five matches alongside striker Adriano. With his poor form in Europe with Porto and Sevilla, however, he did not make any further international appearances for more than three years. He was finally recalled to the national team in November 2007 for 2010 FIFA World Cup qualification matches. On 19 November 2008, he scored his first international hat-trick in a friendly match against Portugal in Brasília. The match ended in a 6–2 victory for Brazil.

On 28 June 2009, Luís Fabiano scored two goals in the 2009 FIFA Confederations Cup final win against the United States. He won the golden boot as the tournament's top scorer with five goals.

Luís Fabiano scored his first international goal in nine months with a right-footed strike against Ivory Coast on 20 June 2010 in the 2010 World Cup. He followed it up with a second goal, which he scored after touching the ball with his hands on two occasions. His third goal of the competition came against Chile in the round of 16 on 29 June 2010, as Brazil won 3–0. On 11 September 2012, Luís Fabiano was called up for the first time since the 2010 World Cup by then coach Mano Menezes for the two Superclásico de las Américas matches against national rivals Argentina, held in both Brazil and Argentina respectively.

== Style of play ==
Luís Fabiano was a prolific goalscorer, with excellent creativity, dribbling skills, and technical ability; he also had a strong physical presence against defenders and goalkeepers. Nonetheless, he had a poor disciplinary record, despite playing as a forward. Even as the top goalscorer in the 2013 season with 16 goals by June, he had received several red cards, hindering São Paulo in important games.

== Personal life ==
Luís Fabiano married Juliana Paradela Clemente in 2005, and they had three children, Giovanna, Gabriella and Giulie. In March 2023, they divorced after it was alleged by Juliana that Luis Fabiano had an affair. In 2005, his mother was kidnapped by gunmen in Campinas. She was rescued by police 62 days later.

== Career statistics ==
=== Club ===
Club	Season	League			State league (Note: Includes Campeonato Paulista, Campeonato Carioca)		National cup (Note: Includes Copa do Brasil, Copa del Rey, Chinese FA Cup)		Continental		Other		Total	
Club	Season	Division	Apps	Goals	Apps	Goals	Apps	Goals	Apps	Goals	Apps	Goals	Apps	Goals
Ponte Preta	1998	Série A	7	2	0	0	0	0	0	0	0	0	7	2
Ponte Preta	1999	Série A	5	1	0	0	0	0	0	0	0	0	5	1
Ponte Preta	Total		12	3	0	0	0	0	0	0	0	0	12	3
Rennes	2000–01	Ligue 1	7	0	–		–		–		–		7	0
Rennes	2001–02	Ligue 1	4	0	–		–		–		1 (Note: Appearance in Coupe de la Ligue)	0	5	0
Rennes	Total		11	0	–		–		–		1	0	12	0
São Paulo (loan)	2001	Série A	22	9	9	5	4	6	6	2	8	9	49	31
São Paulo	2002	Série A	23	19	–		–		–		2	2	25	21
São Paulo	2003	Série A	34	29	10	8	8	8	4	1	–		56	46
São Paulo	2004	Série A	8	6	9	8	–		12	8	–		29	22
São Paulo	Total		87	63	19	16	8	8	16	9	2	2	159	120
Porto	2004–05	Primeira Liga	22	3	–		–		4 (Note: Appearances in UEFA Champions League)	0	1 (Note: Appearance in Intercontinental Cup)	0	27	3
Sevilla	2005–06	La Liga	23	5	–		2	0	12 (Note: Appearances in UEFA Cup)	2	–		37	7
Sevilla	2006–07	La Liga	26	10	–		3	1	9	4	1 (Note: Appearance in UEFA Super Cup)	0	39	15
Sevilla	2007–08	La Liga	30	24	–		4	1	10	7	2 (Note: One appearance and goal in Supercopa de España, one appearance in UEFA Super Cup)	1	46	33
Sevilla	2008–09	La Liga	26	8	–		7	6	4	2	–		37	16
Sevilla	2009–10	La Liga	23	15	–		6	4	6	2	–		35	21
Sevilla	2010–11	La Liga	21	10	–		4	1	8 (Note: Two appearances and one goal in UEFA Champions League, six appearances and one goal in UEFA Europa League)	2	2 (Note: Appearances in Supercopa de España)	1	35	14
Sevilla	Total		149	72	–		26	13	49	19	5	2	229	106
São Paulo	2011	Série A	10	6	–		–		2 (Note: Appearances in Copa Sudamericana)	1	–		12	7
São Paulo	2012	Série A	22	17	8	5	9	8	5	1	–		44	31
São Paulo	2013	Série A	24	6	13	8	–		11 (Note: Six appearances and five goals in Copa Libertadores, five appearances and two goals in Copa Sudamericana)	7	2 (Note: Appearances in Recopa Sudamericana)	0	50	21
São Paulo	2014	Série A	23	9	14	9	3	2	3	0	–		43	20
São Paulo	2015	Série A	22	8	7	3	4	1	6 (Note: Appearances in Copa Libertadores)	1	–		39	13
São Paulo	Total		101	46	42	25	16	11	27	10	2	0	188	92
Tianjin Quanjian	2016	China League One	28	22	–		1	1	–		–		29	23
Vasco da Gama	2017	Série A	12	5	7	1	1	0	–		–		20	6
Career total			422	214	77	47	56	39	102	40	19	13	676	353

=== International ===
Brazil
Year	Apps	Goals
2003	3	1
2004	9	5
2005	0	0
2006	0	0
2007	2	2
2008	9	6
2009	13	11
2010	7	3
2011	0	0
2012	1	0
2013	1	0
Total	45	28

Scores and results list Brazil's goal tally first. Score column indicates score after each Luís Fabiano goal.

#	Date	Venue	Opponent	Score	Result	Competition
1.	11 June 2003	National Stadium, Abuja, Nigeria	Nigeria	2–0	3–0	Friendly
2.	28 April 2004	Ferenc Puskás Stadium, Budapest, Hungary	Hungary	2–0	4–1	Friendly
3.	28 April 2004	Ferenc Puskás Stadium, Budapest, Hungary	Hungary	3–0	4–1	Friendly
4.	6 June 2004	Estadio Nacional, Santiago, Chile	Chile	1–0	1–1	2006 FIFA World Cup qualification
5.	8 July 2004	Estadio Arequipa, Arequipa, Peru	Chile	1–0	1–0	2004 Copa América
6.	14 July 2004	Estadio Arequipa, Arequipa, Peru	Paraguay	1–1	1–2	2004 Copa América
7.	21 November 2007	Estádio do Morumbi, São Paulo, Brazil	Uruguay	1–1	2–1	2010 FIFA World Cup qualification
8.	21 November 2007	Estádio do Morumbi, São Paulo, Brazil	Uruguay	2–1	2–1	2010 FIFA World Cup qualification
9.	31 May 2008	Qwest Field, Seattle, United States	Canada	2–1	3–2	Friendly
10.	7 September 2008	Estadio Nacional, Santiago, Chile	Chile	1–0	3–0	2010 FIFA World Cup qualification
11.	7 September 2008	Estadio Nacional, Santiago, Chile	Chile	3–0	3–0	2010 FIFA World Cup qualification
12.	19 November 2008	Bezerrão, Gama, Brazil	Portugal	1–1	6–2	Friendly
13.	19 November 2008	Bezerrão, Gama, Brazil	Portugal	2–1	6–2	Friendly
14.	19 November 2008	Bezerrão, Gama, Brazil	Portugal	4–1	6–2	Friendly
15.	1 April 2009	Estádio Beira-Rio, Porto Alegre, Brazil	Peru	1–0	3–0	2010 FIFA World Cup qualification
16.	1 April 2009	Estádio Beira-Rio, Porto Alegre, Brazil	Peru	2–0	3–0	2010 FIFA World Cup qualification
17.	6 June 2009	Estadio Centenario, Montevideo, Uruguay	Uruguay	3–0	4–0	2010 FIFA World Cup qualification
18.	15 June 2009	Free State Stadium, Bloemfontein, South Africa	Egypt	2–1	4–3	2009 FIFA Confederations Cup
19.	21 June 2009	Loftus Versfeld Stadium, Pretoria, South Africa	Italy	1–0	3–0	2009 FIFA Confederations Cup
20.	21 June 2009	Loftus Versfeld Stadium, Pretoria, South Africa	Italy	2–0	3–0	2009 FIFA Confederations Cup
21.	28 June 2009	Ellis Park Stadium, Johannesburg, South Africa	United States	1–2	3–2	2009 FIFA Confederations Cup
22.	28 June 2009	Ellis Park Stadium, Johannesburg, South Africa	United States	2–2	3–2	2009 FIFA Confederations Cup
23.	12 August 2009	A. Le Coq Arena, Tallinn, Estonia	Estonia	1–0	1–0	Friendly
24.	5 September 2009	Estadio Gigante de Arroyito, Rosario, Argentina	Argentina	2–0	3–1	2010 FIFA World Cup qualification
25.	5 September 2009	Estadio Gigante de Arroyito, Rosario, Argentina	Argentina	3–1	3–1	2010 FIFA World Cup qualification
26.	20 June 2010	Soccer City, Johannesburg, South Africa	Ivory Coast	1–0	3–1	2010 FIFA World Cup
27.	20 June 2010	Soccer City, Johannesburg, South Africa	Ivory Coast	2–0	3–1	2010 FIFA World Cup
28.	28 June 2010	Ellis Park Stadium, Johannesburg, South Africa	Chile	2–0	3–0	2010 FIFA World Cup

== Honours ==
São Paulo

- Copa Sudamericana: 2012
- Torneio Rio-São Paulo: 2001

Porto

- Intercontinental Cup: 2004

Sevilla

- Copa del Rey: 2006–07, 2009–10
- Supercopa de España: 2007
- UEFA Cup: 2005–06, 2006–07
- UEFA Super Cup: 2006

Tianjin Quanjian

- China League One: 2016

Brazil

- Copa América: 2004
- FIFA Confederations Cup: 2009

Individual

- Campeonato Brasileiro Série A Top Scorer: 2002
- Bola de Prata: 2002, 2003
- Placar Golden Boot: 2003 (most goals in all competitions in Brazil)
- Copa Libertadores Top Scorer: 2004
- Copa Libertadores Team of the Year: 2004
- Samba Gold: 2009 Gold, 2008 Bronze
- La Liga Team of the Season: 2007–08
- FIFA Confederations Cup Golden Shoe: 2009
- FIFA Confederations Cup Silver Ball: 2009
- FIFA Confederations Cup Best XI: 2009
- Copa do Brasil Top Scorer: 2012
- China League One Most Valuable Player: 2016
- China League One Top Scorer: 2016
- IFFHS Brazilian Top Scorer of The 21st Century
