= 2001 Torneio Rio-São Paulo =

Torneio Rio-São Paulo
- Season: 2001
- Champions: São Paulo (1st title)
- Matches: 22
- Goals: 68 (3.09 per match)
- Top goalscorer: França (São Paulo) – 6 goals
- Biggest home win: Fluminense 5–2 São Paulo (Jan 25)
- Biggest away win: Botafogo 1–4 São Paulo (Feb 28); Flamengo 0–3 Santos (Jan 17)

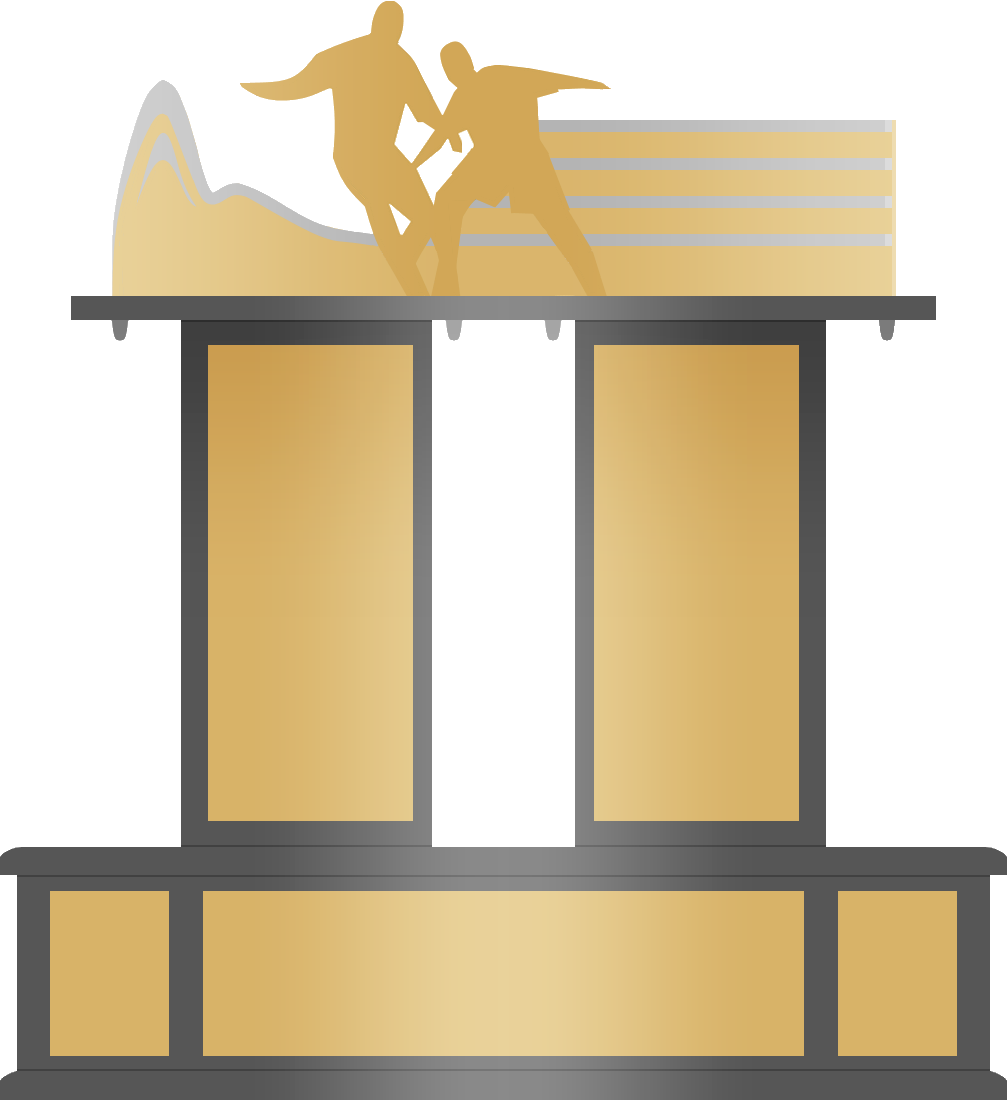
Trophy from the 2001 Rio-São Paulo Tournament

The 2001 Torneio Rio São Paulo was the 25th edition of the Torneio Rio-São Paulo. It was disputed between 17 January to 7 March 2001.

== Participants ==
Team	City	Ground	Nº participations	Best result
Botafogo	(Rio de Janeiro (state)) Rio de Janeiro	Caio Martins and Maracanã	22	Champions: 1962, 1964 (shared), 1966 (shared), 1998
Corinthians	(São Paulo (state)) São Paulo	Pacaembu	25	Champions: 1950, 1953, 1954, 1966 (shared)
Flamengo	(Rio de Janeiro (state)) Rio de Janeiro	Edson Passos and Maracanã	24	Champions: 1961
Fluminense	(Rio de Janeiro (state)) Rio de Janeiro	Caio Martins and Maracanã	24	Champions: 1957, 1960
Palmeiras	(São Paulo (state)) São Paulo	Parque Antártica	25	Champions: 1933, 1951, 1965, 1993, 2000
Santos	(São Paulo (state)) Santos	Vila Belmiro	21	Champions: 1959, 1963, 1964 (shared), 1966 (shared), 1997
São Paulo	(São Paulo (state)) São Paulo	Morumbi	24	Runners-up: 1933, 1962, 1998
Vasco da Gama	(Rio de Janeiro (state)) Rio de Janeiro	São Januário	25	Champions: 1958, 1966 (shared), 1999

== Format ==
The clubs were separated in two groups: Group A, with the teams of Rio de Janeiro, and Group B, with the teams of São Paulo. The clubs from Group A plays against clubs from Group B. The two best teams of each group advanced to the semifinals, and the winners from semifinals, to the finals.

== Tournament ==
Following is the summary of the 2001 Torneio Rio-São Paulo tournament:

=== Group A ===
Pos	Team	Pld	W	D	L	GF	GA	GD	Pts	Qualification
1	(Rio de Janeiro (state)) Fluminense	4	2	2	0	11	6	+5	8	Qualified to semifinals
2	(Rio de Janeiro (state)) Botafogo	4	1	2	1	7	8	−1	5	Qualified to semifinals
3	(Rio de Janeiro (state)) Vasco da Gama	4	1	1	2	1	5	−4	4	
4	(Rio de Janeiro (state)) Flamengo	4	0	1	3	3	10	−7	1	

Source: RSSSF
Rules for classification: 1) points; 2) wins; 3) goal difference; 4) goals for.

=== Group B ===
Pos	Team	Pld	W	D	L	GF	GA	GD	Pts	Qualification
1	(São Paulo (state)) Santos	4	3	1	0	11	2	+9	10	Qualified to semifinals
2	(São Paulo (state)) São Paulo	4	2	1	1	7	6	+1	7	Qualified to semifinals
3	(São Paulo (state)) Corinthians	4	1	2	1	8	8	0	5	
4	(São Paulo (state)) Palmeiras	4	1	1	2	3	6	−3	4	

Source: RSSSF
Rules for classification: 1) points; 2) wins; 3) goal difference; 4) goals for.

=== Semifinals ===
Team 1	Agg.	Team 2	1st leg	2nd leg
Fluminense	2–2 (6–7 p)	São Paulo	0–1	2–1
Santos	2–3	Botafogo	2–2	0–1

=== Finals ===
28 February 2001

Botafogo (Rio de Janeiro (state))	1–4	(São Paulo (state)) São Paulo
Rodrigo 50'	Report	Carlos Miguel 49'; Luís Fabiano 51', 85'; França 62'

Maracanã, Rio de Janeiro
Attendance: 35,672
Referee: Alfredo Loebeling

7 March 2001

São Paulo (São Paulo (state))	2–1	(Rio de Janeiro (state)) Botafogo
Kaká 79', 81'	Report	Donizete 39'

Morumbi, São Paulo
Attendance: 71,668
Referee: Jorge Rabello

== Top scorers ==
Rank	Player	Club	Goals
1	França	São Paulo	6
2	Luizão	Corinthians	5
2	Agnaldo	Fluminense	5
4	Donizete	Botafogo	4
4	Faustino Asprilla	Fluminense	4
