= Alencar (footballer, born 1975) =

Brazilian footballer

Personal information
- Full name: Francisco Paulo de Alencar Filho
- Date of birth: 17 July 1975 (age 51)
- Place of birth: Londrina, Brazil
- Height: 1.90 m (6 ft 3 in)
- Position: Goalkeeper

Youth career
- –1993: Londrina

Senior career*
Years	Team	Apps	(Gls)
1991–1996	Londrina		
1996–1999	XV de Piracicaba		
1999	→ Ituano (loan)		
1999–2003	São Paulo	5	(0)
2003	União Barbarense		
2004	Gama		
2004–2005	Caldense		
2005–2006	Gama		
2007	Caldense		
2007	Democrata-GV		
2007–2008	São Bento		
2008	América Mineiro		
2008	Marília		
2009	Iraty		
2009–2010	Gama		
- * Club domestic league appearances and goals as of 30 August 2023

Francisco Paulo de Alencar Filho (born 17 July 1975), better known as Alencar, is a Brazilian former professional footballer who played as a goalkeeper.

== Career ==
Appearing in the youth categories for Londrina and with a good record for XV de Piracicaba, he arrived at São Paulo FC where he was marked by his performance against Vasco da Gama in 2001, which resulted in a 7–1 defeat.

Alencar is currently the general manager of Grêmio Prudente.

== Honours ==
=== São Paulo ===
- Campeonato Paulista: 2000
- Torneio Rio-São Paulo: 2001
