= Marco Brito =

Brazilian footballer (born 1977)

Personal information
- Full name: Marco Luiz Brito
- Date of birth: August 4, 1977 (age 49)
- Place of birth: Rio de Janeiro (RJ), Brazil
- Height: 1.80 m (5 ft 11 in)
- Position: Forward

Youth career
- 1995–1997: Fluminense

Senior career*
Years	Team	Apps	(Gls)
1997–2001	Fluminense		
2001	Yokohama F. Marinos		
2002	Fluminense		
2003	Coritiba		
2004	APOEL		
2005	Vasco da Gama		
2006	Santa Cruz		
2006	Ponte Preta		
2007–2008	América-RJ		
2009	CSA		
2010	Morrinhos		
2012	São Gonçalo EC		

Managerial career
- 2013: Itaboraí Profute (assistant)
- * Club domestic league appearances and goals

Marco Luiz Brito (born August 4, 1977) is a retired Brazilian footballer.

== Club statistics ==
Club performance			League		Cup		League Cup		Total	
Season	Club	League	Apps	Goals	Apps	Goals	Apps	Goals	Apps	Goals
Japan			League		Emperor's Cup		J.League Cup		Total	
2001	Yokohama F. Marinos	J1 League	10	8	1	0	5	2	16	10
Total			10	8	1	0	5	2	16	10
