= Reginaldo Araújo =

Brazilian footballer (1977–2016)

Personal information
- Full name: António Reginaldo Matias de Araújo
- Date of birth: 2 October 1977
- Place of birth: Presidente Prudente, Brazil
- Date of death: 11 January 2016 (aged 38)
- Place of death: Cornélio Procópio, Brazil
- Height: 1.81 m (5 ft 11 in)
- Position: Right-back

Youth career
- 1993–1996: Matsubara

Senior career*
Years	Team	Apps	(Gls)
1997–2001	Coritiba	51	(2)
2001	São Paulo	12	(1)
2002	Coritiba	23	(2)
2003	Santos	38	(0)
2004–2005	Flamengo	10	(0)
2005–2006	Noroeste		
2006	Santa Cruz	11	(1)
2007	Beira Mar	8	(0)
2008	Criciúma		
2009	Foz do Iguaçu		
2010	Rio Branco (PR)		

International career
1999	Brazil U-23	1	(0)

Managerial career
- 2015–2016: PSTC (assistant manager)
- * Club domestic league appearances and goals

António Reginaldo Matias de Araújo (2 October 1977 – 11 January 2016), or simply Reginaldo Araújo, was a Brazilian footballer who played at right-back.

== Playing career ==
Starting his career at Matsubara, Araújo joined Coritiba in 1997. Having success at Coritiba, he was called up by Brazil U-23 team challenging for a spot in the squad that played the 2000 Olympic Games. He joined São Paulo in 2001, but after an unsuccessful year, he returned to Coritiba in 2002.

Araújo was signed by Santos, who were the current national champions. He was a 2003 Copa Libertadores runner-up and was sent off in the first leg of the final against Boca Juniors. He moved to Flamengo in 2004, where he was a 2004 Copa do Brasil runner-up.

He later had spells at Noroeste and Santa Cruz before a spell in Portugal with S.C. Beira-Mar. Reginaldo Araújo moved back to Brazil to play for Criciúma and returned to Paraná state in his last career years.

== Retirement ==
He retired in 2010 after discovering a heart condition and worked with the youth team and as a director of football at Corinthians Paulista and was appointed as an assistant manager of PSTC in December 2015.

== Death ==
On 11 January 2016, he died after suffering a heart attack during a training of PSTC.
