= Allan Dellon =

Brazilian footballer (born 1979)

Personal information
- Full name: Allan Dellon Santos Dantas
- Date of birth: 16 February 1979 (age 47)
- Place of birth: Vila Velha, Brazil
- Height: 1.74 m (5 ft 9 in)
- Position: Striker

Youth career
- 1995–1996: Vitória

Senior career*
| Years | Team | Apps | (Gls) |
| 1997–2003 | Vitória | 253 | (80) |
| 2003–2004 | Querétaro | 12 | (0) |
| 2004 | Celaya | 11 | (3) |
| 2004 | Vitória | 15 | (4) |
| 2005 | Vasco | 10 | (0) |
| 2005 | Sport | | |
| 2006–2007 | Brasiliense | | |
- * Club domestic league appearances and goals

Allan Dellon Santos Dantas (born 16 February 1979), or simply Allan Dellon, is a Brazilian striker.

== Career ==
Born in Vila Velha, Allan Dellon began his playing career with Vitória. He made his Campeonato Brasileiro Série A debut for the club in 1998, and would score 14 goals in the 2000 Brasileiro and 11 goals in the 2001 Brasileiro.

== Honours ==
- Nordeste Cup: 1997, 1999
- Bahia State League: 2000, 2002

== Contract ==
- 1 January 2006 to 20 December 2007
