= Leandro Alves (footballer, born 1982) =

Brazilian footballer

Personal information
- Full name: Leandro Alves Pereira
- Date of birth: 26 February 1982 (age 44)
- Place of birth: Araçatuba, Brazil
- Position: Forward

Youth career
- –2003: São Paulo

Senior career*
Years	Team	Apps	(Gls)
2001–2003	São Paulo	10	(2)
2002	→ Paraná (loan)		
2004	Santos		
2004	Bragantino		
2005–2006	Puebla		
2006	Paulista		
2007	15 de Novembro		
2007–2008	Caxias		
2008	América-SP		
2008	Ituano		
2009	Avenida		
2011	Fernandópolis		
2012	Avenida		
2012	Penapolense		
2012	Araçatuba		

International career
1999	Brazil U17		
- * Club domestic league appearances and goals as of 28 September 2023

Leandro Alves Pereira (born 26 February 1982), also known as Leandro or Leandro Alves, is a Brazilian former professional footballer, who played as a forward.

== Career ==
Leandro stood out mainly in the youth categories, being South American and world under 17 champion and the Copa SP de Juniores with São Paulo in 2000. He scored two goals in his professional debut for São Paulo, on 9 September 2001, against Goiás.

== Honours ==
Brazil U17

- FIFA U-17 World Championship: 1999
- South American U-17 Championship: 1999

São Paulo

- Copa São Paulo de Futebol Jr.: 2000
