= Rodrigo Beckham =

Brazilian footballer (born 1976)

Rodrigo
Personal information
- Full name: Rodrigo Becks Juliano Lopes de Almeida
- Date of birth: 7 August 1976 (age 50)
- Place of birth: Santos, Brazil
- Height: 1.73 m (5 ft 8 in)
- Position: Midfielder

Youth career
- 1995: Portuguesa Santista

Senior career*
Years	Team	Apps	(Gls)
1996–1998	Portuguesa Santista		
1997	→ Guarani (loan)	4	(0)
1998	→ Gama (loan)	14	(9)
1999–2003	Botafogo	59	(19)
2002	→ Atlético Mineiro (loan)	0	(0)
2002–2003	→ Everton (loan)	4	(0)
2004	Corinthians	6	(0)
2005	Juventude	0	(0)
2005	Atlético Paranaense	6	(1)
2005	Vasco da Gama	7	(0)
2006–2007	Boavista		
2007	Paraná	1	(0)
2008	Boavista	243	
2009	Fortaleza		
2010	Red Bull Brasil		
Total		101+	(29+)

Managerial career
- 2014–2015: Boavista (assistant)
- 2015–2016: Boavista
- * Club domestic league appearances and goals

Rodrigo Juliano Lopes de Almeida (born 7 August 1976) is a former Brazilian football midfielder, commonly known as Rodrigo Beckham due to having various similarities to David Beckham.

== Career ==
Rodrigo started his career at local club Portuguesa Santista in 1995, having played for the club in Campeonato Paulista matches and was loaned to Guarani for the 1997 Campeonato Brasileiro Série A. After returning to Portuguesa Santista, he was loaned to Gama and was a key player for the club as they won 1998 Campeonato Brasileiro Série B, scoring 9 goals in 14 matches.

In 1999, Rodrigo joined Botafogo, shining at national level and becoming the club top goalscorer at the 2000 and 2001 Campeonato Brasileiro Série A editions, also being touted to a call-up to Brazil national football team. In 2002, he was loaned to Atlético Mineiro, where he injured his right knee in a match against Cruzeiro.

Rodrigo was signed on loan for Everton in July 2002, choosing his name to be printed as Rodrigol. However, his knee injury was not properly diagnosed and he suffered a ruptured ligament in September and did not play for the club again before being released in May the following year, having played only four matches. He went on trial with Leeds United in the summer of 2003.

After returning to Brazil, he joined Corinthians in 2004, but he dealt with persistent injuries and surgeries to his knee and could not recover his previous form. Later, he had unsuccessful spells at Juventude, Atlético Paranaense, Vasco da Gama, Paraná and Boavista, before ending his playing career at Red Bull Brasil in 2010.

After retiring, Rodrigo worked as a pundit and, in 2014, became an assistant manager for Boavista, being promoted to manager in the following year. He stayed as manager in 2016 and was replaced by Joel Santana in 2017.

== Honours ==
Gama

- Campeonato Brasileiro Série B: 1998
- Campeonato Brasiliense: 1998

Boavista

- Campeonato Carioca Série B: 2006

Fortaleza

- Campeonato Cearense: 2009

Red Bull Brasil

- Campeonato Paulista Série A3: 2010
