= Émerson (footballer, born 1975) =

Brazilian footballer

Personal information
- Full name: Émerson Carvalho da Silva
- Date of birth: January 5, 1975 (age 51)
- Place of birth: Bauru, Brazil
- Height: 1.81 m (5 ft 11 1/2 in)
- Position: Defender

Senior career*
Years	Team	Apps	(Gls)
1994–2002	Portuguesa Desportos		
2002	São Paulo		
2003	Shimizu S-Pulse	15	(1)
2004	Os Belenenses		
2004	Paraná		
2005	Botafogo		
2006	Paraná		
2006–2007	Ponte Preta		

International career
2000	Brazil	3	(0)
- * Club domestic league appearances and goals

Émerson Carvalho da Silva (born January 5, 1975) is a former Brazilian football player.

== Playing career ==
Émerson played for Portuguesa for a long time. In 2000's, he played for São Paulo, Shimizu S-Pulse, Os Belenenses, Paraná, Botafogo and Ponte Preta. He retired end of 2007 season.

In 2000, Émerson played for Brazil national team in 3 matches including against Bolivia at 2002 World Cup qualification.

== Club statistics ==
Club performance			League		Cup		League Cup		Total	
Season	Club	League	Apps	Goals	Apps	Goals	Apps	Goals	Apps	Goals
Japan			League		Emperor's Cup		J.League Cup		Total	
2003	Shimizu S-Pulse	J1 League	15	1	0	0	2	1	17	2
Total			15	1	0	0	2	1	17	2

== National team statistics ==
Brazil national team
Year	Apps	Goals
2000	3	0
Total	3	0
