= França (footballer, born 1976) =

Brazilian footballer (born 1976)

Personal information
- Full name: Françoaldo Sena de Souza
- Date of birth: 2 March 1976 (age 50)
- Place of birth: Codó, Brazil
- Height: 1.83 m (6 ft 0 in)
- Position: Striker

Senior career*
Years	Team	Apps	(Gls)
1993	Nacional		
1994–1995	XV Jaú		
1996–2002	São Paulo	161	(99)
2002–2005	Bayer Leverkusen	71	(21)
2005–2010	Kashiwa Reysol	102	(29)
2011	Yokohama	9	(1)

International career
2000–2002	Brazil	8	(1)
- * Club domestic league appearances and goals

Françoaldo Sena de Souza (born 2 March 1976), commonly known as França, is a Brazilian former professional footballer who played as a striker.

== Club career ==
França was born in Codó, Maranhão. After his senior beginnings with lowly Nacional Futebol Clube and Esporte Clube XV de Novembro (Jaú), he moved in 1996 to national powerhouse São Paulo FC, where he proceeded to net eight goals overall in his debut year – even though he did not start regularly – and 182 goals in 323 games during his six-year stay (fourth all-time at the time of his departure); in 1998 and 2000, as the club won the Campeonato Paulista, the player was crowned the league's best scorer, respectively at 12 and 18.

In the 2002 summer, França signed with Bayer 04 Leverkusen from Germany as the team sought replacements for aging Ulf Kirsten (37). In his debut season in the Bundesliga he appeared scarcely, barred by Dimitar Berbatov and Oliver Neuville, netting only once, in his league debut in a 2–4 home loss against VfL Bochum;

In 2003–04, although the pair remained at the BayArena, França received much more playing time, and finished just two goals short of the Bulgarian (14 to 16, in as many matches), adding to this a league-best 13 assists. Additionally, Neuville left the following summer.

França moved to Japan subsequently, joining Kashiwa Reysol, experiencing one relegation and one promotion in his first two years and leaving the club in 2010, aged 34.

== International career ==
França collected eight caps for Brazil during two years, but was never selected to any major tournament. He scored once for the national team; his only goal coming in a friendly against England in May 2000.

== Career statistics ==
=== Club ===
Appearances and goals by club, season and competition
Club	Season	League			State League		National cup		League cup		Continental		Total	
Club	Season	Division	Apps	Goals	Apps	Goals	Apps	Goals	Apps	Goals	Apps	Goals	Apps	Goals
São Paulo	1996	Série A	8	1	18	8	2	0	–		6 (Note: Appearances in Copa de Oro, Copa Master de CONMEBOL, and Supercopa Libertadores)	0	34	9
São Paulo	1997	Série A	15	3	2	2	3	0	22 (Note: Appearances in Torneio Rio – São Paulo)	2	3 (Note: Appearances in Supercopa Libertadores)	2	45	9
São Paulo	1998	Série A	22	7	9	12	4	1	11	1	6 (Note: Appearances in Copa Mercosur)	2	52	23
São Paulo	1999	Série A	22	12	3	5	3	2	1 (Note: Appearance in pt:Seletiva para a Libertadores)	1	6	4	35	24
São Paulo	2000	Série A	16	8	11	18	9	5	3	5	–		54	40
São Paulo	2001	Série A	25	13	10	10	6	8	12 (Note: Six appearances and five goals in Copa dos Campeões, six appearances and six goals in Torneio Rio – São Paulo)	11	6	3	65	45
São Paulo	2002	Série A	–		–		7	5	11	19	–		18	24
São Paulo	Total		108	44	53	55	34	21	60	39	27	11	282	174
Bayer Leverkusen	2002–03	Bundesliga	16	1	–		4	2	1	0	8 (Note: Appearances in UEFA Champions League)	2	29	5
Bayer Leverkusen	2003–04	Bundesliga	33	14	–		2	0	–		–		35	14
Bayer Leverkusen	2004–05	Bundesliga	22	6	–		1	2	2	0	7	6	32	14
Bayer Leverkusen	2005–06	Bundesliga	–		–		–		1	0	–		1	0
Bayer Leverkusen	Total		71	21	0	0	7	4	4	0	15	8	97	33
Kashiwa Reysol	2005	J1 League	3	0	–		1	0	0	0	–		4	0
Kashiwa Reysol	2006	J2 League	28	4	–		0	0	–		–		28	4
Kashiwa Reysol	2007	J1 League	25	8	–		0	0	1	0	–		26	8
Kashiwa Reysol	2008	J1 League	19	4	–		4	2	2	1	–		25	7
Kashiwa Reysol	2009	J1 League	23	10	–		1	0	1	0	–		25	10
Kashiwa Reysol	2010	J2 League	4	3	–		–		–		–		4	3
Kashiwa Reysol	Total		102	29	0	0	6	2	4	1	0	0	112	32
Career total			281	94	53	55	47	27	68	40	42	19	491	235

=== International ===
Appearances and goals by national team and year
National team	Year	Apps	Goals
Brazil	2000	6	1
Brazil	2001	0	0
Brazil	2002	2	0
Total		8	1

== Honours ==
São Paulo

- Campeonato Paulista: 1998, 2000
- Torneio Rio – São Paulo: 2001
- Copa Master de CONMEBOL: 1996

Kashiwa Reysol

- J.League Division 2: 2010
