= Souza (footballer, born 1975) =

Brazilian footballer

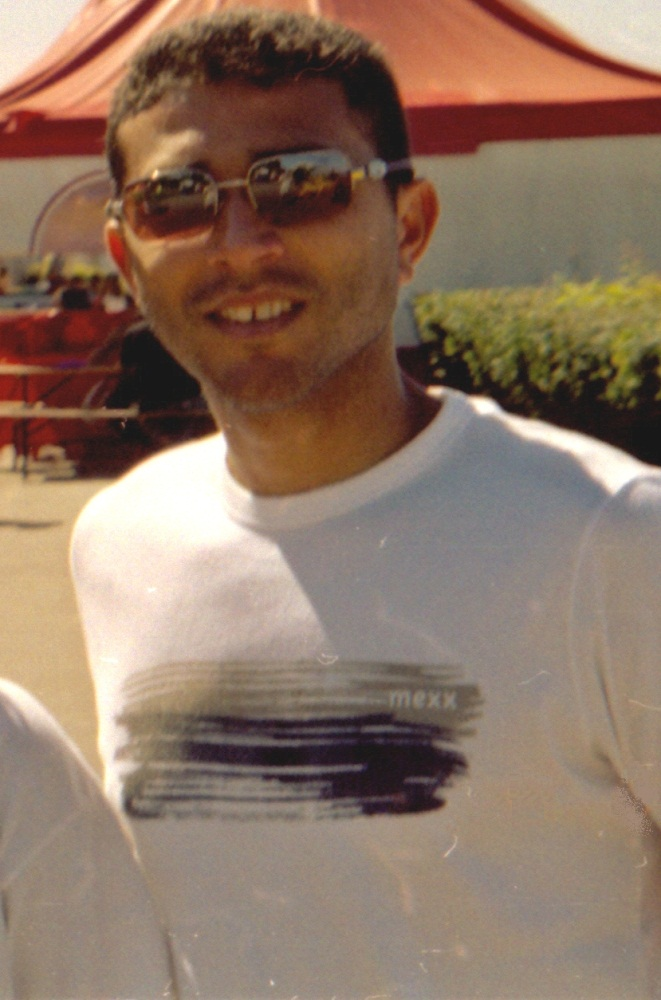

Personal information
- Full name: José Ivanaldo de Souza
- Date of birth: 6 June 1975 (age 51)
- Place of birth: Itajá, Rio Grande do Norte, Brazil
- Height: 1.70 m (5 ft 7 in)
- Position: Attacking midfielder

Youth career
- 1991–1993: América-RN

Senior career*
Years	Team	Apps	(Gls)
1993–1994	Rio Branco-SP		
1994–1998	Corinthians	76	(10)
1998–2001	São Paulo	50	(6)
2001	Atlético-PR	20	(6)
2002	São Paulo		
2002	Atlético Mineiro	18	(4)
2002–2005	Krylia Sovetov	56	(8)
2005–2006	Flamengo	25	(2)
2006–2007	América-RN	54	(7)
2008	Atlético Mineiro		
2008–2009	América-RN	19	(1)

International career
1995–1996	Brazil	6	(1)
- * Club domestic league appearances and goals

José Ivanaldo de Souza (born 6 June 1975 in Itajá), or simply Souza, is a Brazilian former footballer who played as an attacking midfielder.

== Honours ==
=== Club ===
- Rio Grande do Norte State League: 1991, 1992
- Bandeirantes Cup: 1994
- São Paulo State League: 1995, 2000, 2002
- Brazilian Cup: 1995, 2006
- Ramon de Carranza Trophy: 1996
- Brazilian League: 2001
- Tournament Rio – São Paulo: 2001
- São Paulo State Superleague: 2002

=== International ===
- Pre-Olympic Tournament: 1996
