= Sandro Hiroshi =

Brazilian footballer

Personal information
- Full name: Sandro Hiroshi Parreão Oi
- Date of birth: 19 November 1979 (age 46)
- Place of birth: Araguaína, Brazil
- Height: 1.74 m (5 ft 9 in)
- Position: Forward

Senior career*
Years	Team	Apps	(Gls)
1998	Tocantinópolis		
1999	Rio Branco		
1999–2001	São Paulo	39	(6)
2001–2002	Flamengo	9	(0)
2003	Figueirense	16	(1)
2003	Al-Jazira		
2004	Guarani	33	(5)
2005	Daegu FC	24	(10)
2006–2008	Chunnam Dragons	30	(10)
2009	América RN	9	(1)
2009	Suwon Bluewings	7	(0)
2010	Santo André	11	(1)
2011	Red Bull Brasil	7	(1)
2011–2013	Rio Branco	24	(2)

International career^{‡}
1997	Brazil U-17		
- * Club domestic league appearances and goals as of 16 August 2010 ‡ National team caps and goals as of 16 August 2010

Sandro Hiroshi Parreão Oi (born 19 November 1979) is a Brazilian former professional footballer.

He played domestically for Tocantinópolis, Rio Branco, São Paulo, Flamengo, Figueirense, Guarani, América RN, Santo André and Red Bull Brasil, in the United Arab Emirates for Al-Jazira, and for South Korean clubs Daegu FC, Chunnam Dragons and Suwon Bluewings.

While playing for São Paulo in 1999, Hiroshi was at the center of a controversy surrounding his transfer rights between Tocantinópolis and Rio Branco, who argued over whether his transfer to São Paulo had to be authorized by the former or not, leading the Brazilian Football Confederation to block his transfer rights until the dispute was sorted out. Following a 6-1 win over Botafogo for the 1999 Campeonato Brasileiro Série A, in which Hiroshi took part, Botafogo requested the result to be annulled after perceiving Hiroshi should not have been named due to the troubles surrounding his transfer rights. The Sports Justice Court accepted the decision, awarding to Botafogo the three points São Paulo had earned for the match. Later on, Internacional also successfully appealed to have a match result voided (a 2-2 draw) on the same grounds, earning two more points and causing São Paulo to lose the one point earned on that match. This combination of results had the effect of saving Botafogo from relegation to Série B, with Gama being relegated in their place. In turn, Gama went to court to protest the decision, and the ensuing legal proceedings prevented CBF from organizing the 2000 edition of Campeonato Brasileiro, which was replaced with Copa João Havelange for that year. An investigation by newspaper Folha de São Paulo also revealed that, in addition to the transfer issues, Hiroshi had also been playing with falsified documents which showed his birth year as 1980 instead of 1979. Hiroshi was suspended by CBF and banned from the sport for 180 days, having also been indicted for forgery; however, this did not factor in the decisions concerning the Campeonato Brasileiro match results.
