= Wilson (footballer, born 1975) =

Brazilian footballer

Personal information
- Full name: Wilson Roberto dos Santos
- Date of birth: August 4, 1975 (age 51)
- Place of birth: São Paulo, Brazil
- Height: 1.88 m (6 ft 2 in)
- Position: Central defender

Youth career
- 1995–1996: Bragantino

Senior career*
Years	Team	Apps	(Gls)
1997	Bragantino	1	(0)
1998–1999	Atlético-PR	44	(0)
1999–2002	São Paulo	21	(1)
2003–2006	Internacional	133	(7)
2008–????	Corinthians (AL)	0	(0)
- * Club domestic league appearances and goals

Wilson Roberto dos Santos or simply Wilson (born August 4, 1975) is a Brazilian soccer player, a central-defender. He currently plays for Corinthians (AL).

Wilson has played in the Campeonato Brasileiro for Atlético-PR, São Paulo and Internacional.

== Honours ==
Campeonato Paulista (2002) and Campeonato Gaúcho in three times (2002, 2003 and 2004).
