= Carlos Miguel (footballer, born 1972) =

Brazilian footballer

Personal information
- Full name: Carlos Miguel da Silva Júnior
- Date of birth: 12 June 1972 (age 54)
- Place of birth: Bento Gonçalves, Brazil
- Height: 1.77 m (5 ft 10 in)
- Position: Midfielder

Senior career*
Years	Team	Apps	(Gls)
1992–1997	Grêmio	66	(10)
1997	Sporting CP	5	(0)
1998–2001	São Paulo	65	(5)
2002	Internacional	14	(2)
2003–2004	Grêmio	13	(1)
2005–2007	Corinthians-AL	?	(?)

International career^{‡}
2001	Brazil	5	(1)
- * Club domestic league appearances and goals as of 15:52, 24 August 2009 (UTC) ‡ National team caps and goals as of 15:59, 24 August 2009 (UTC)

Carlos Miguel da Silva Júnior (born 12 June 1972 in Bento Gonçalves, Brazil), better known as Carlos Miguel, is a former Brazilian footballer who played as a midfielder.

== Career ==
He began his career at Grêmio in 1992, but gained prominence with the arrival of coach Luiz Felipe Scolari in 1993. He was successful at Grêmio, winning the Copa Libertadores in 1995.

Having gained experience with Grêmio, in 1997 he moved to Europe, moving to Sporting CP in Portugal, but he did not adapt to the new continent and moved back to Brazil, joining São Paulo.

In 2001, good performances saw him called up to the Brazil squad for the 2001 Confederations Cup by manager Emerson Leão. Carlos Miguel scored the second goal in Brazil's 2–0 victory over Cameroon, with the other goal being scored by Washington. Brazil eventually exited the tournament in the semi-finals. His five matches in the tournament were the only appearances he ever made for the national team.

He retired in 2007 after a spell with Corinthians-AL came to an end.
