= Adriano Gerlin =

Brazilian footballer

Personal information
- Full name: Adriano Gerlin da Silva
- Date of birth: 20 September 1974 (age 52)
- Place of birth: Dracena, Brazil
- Height: 1.71 m (5 ft 7 in)
- Position: Attacking midfielder

Senior career*
Years	Team	Apps	(Gls)
1991–1992	Guarani		
1992–1995	Neuchâtel Xamax	22	(7)
1995	Botafogo		
1995	Juventude		
1996–1998	São Paulo		
1999	Náutico		
1999	Atlético Mineiro		
2000	Sport		
2001	Urawa Reds	22	(6)
2002	São Paulo		
2003	Bahia		
2003	Náutico		
2004	Portuguesa Santista		
2005	Pogoń Szczecin	3	(0)
2006	Bragantino		
2006	CRB		
2006	Atlético Nacional		
2007	Juventus-SP		
2008–2010	Grêmio Prudente		
2012	Grêmio Prudente		

International career
1990–1991	Brazil U17		
1991–1993	Brazil U20		
Medal record
Men's football
Representing Brazil
FIFA World Youth Championship
Winner	1993 Australia
- * Club domestic league appearances and goals

Adriano Gerlin da Silva (born September 20, 1974), or simply Adriano, is a Brazilian former professional footballer who played as an attacking midfielder.

He was the top scorer at the 1991 FIFA U-17 World Championship, and won the Golden Ball at the 1993 FIFA World Youth Championship.

== Club career ==
He was signed by Pogoń Szczecin on 2 March 2005, and returned to Brazil to join Bragantino on 11 January 2006.

On 20 July 2006, he left for Colombian club Atlético Nacional.

On 13 February 2007, he signed a four-month contract with CA Juventus of Campeonato Paulista/Série C.

== Club statistics ==
Club performance			League		Cup		League Cup		Total	
Season	Club	League	Apps	Goals	Apps	Goals	Apps	Goals	Apps	Goals
Japan			League		Emperor's Cup		J.League Cup		Total	
2001	Urawa Reds	J1 League	22	6	0	0	3	1	25	7
Total			22	6	0	0	3	1	25	7

== Honours ==
São Paulo

- Copa Master de CONMEBOL
- Campeonato Paulista: 1998

Sport

- Campeonato Pernambucano: 2000
- Copa do Nordeste: 2000

Brazil U20

- FIFA World Youth Championship: 1993

Individual

- FIFA World Youth Championship Golden Ball: 1993
- FIFA U-17 World Cup Golden Shoe: 1991
