= 1997 Supercopa Libertadores finals =

- Event: 1997 Supercopa Libertadores
São Paulo	River Plate
(Brazil)	(Argentina)
1	2
- on aggregate

First Leg
São Paulo	River Plate
0	0
- Date: December 4, 1997
- Venue: Estádio do Morumbi, São Paulo
- Referee: Mario Sánchez Yanten (Chile)
- Attendance: 45,413

Second Leg
River Plate	São Paulo
2	1
- Date: December 17, 1997
- Venue: Estadio Monumental, Buenos Aires
- Referee: Ubaldo Aquino (Paraguay)
- Attendance: 59,180

The 1997 Supercopa Libertadores finals were the final matches of the 1997 Supercopa Libertadores, the tenth and final edition of South America's secondary club football competition. The two-legged event was contested between São Paulo of Brazil and River Plate of Argentina. The first leg was played at the Estádio do Morumbi, São Paulo, on 4 December 1997 and the second leg was played on 17 December 1997 at the Estadio Monumental, Buenos Aires. They were both appearing in their second final. São Paulo had previously won the tournament in 1993, while River Plate had lost the final of the 1991 edition.

Each team had to progress through their group stage in first position, and subsequently play a single knockout round, totalizing eight matches. São Paulo won their group against Flamengo, Olimpia and Vélez Sarsfield before beating Colo-Colo, while River Plate defeated Atlético Nacional after finishing ahead of Vasco da Gama, Santos and Racing Club to qualify for the final.

A crowd of 45,413 spectated the first leg at the Estádio do Morumbi, which resulted in a goalless draw. Watched by a crowd of 59,180 at the Estadio Monumental, River Plate took an early lead in the second half when Marcelo Salas scored. Dodô equalised the match minutes later for São Paulo, but the Chilean striker would sign a brace for a 2–1 scoreline. No further goals were scored, thus crowning River Plate champions of the last edition of the Supercopa Libertadores.

== Background ==
The Supercopa Libertadores was founded in the late 1980s. It was established to determine who would face the Copa Libertadores' season champion in the Recopa Sudamericana, looking to crown the best team in South America. The competition brought together every past winner of the Copa Libertadores into a single-elimination tournament until 1997, when the format was altered to have a double round-robin precede the two-legged semi-final and final matches. The Supercopa Libertadores was regarded as the second most prestigious South American club competition.

São Paulo first qualified for the Supercopa Libertadores as winners of the 1992 Copa Libertadores. They won their first Copa Libertadores final after beating Argentine team Newell's Old Boys 3–2 on penalties, following a 1–1 tie over two legs. Their debut tournament saw them beat fellow Brazilian squad Santos, but lose their quarter-final match against Club Olimpia of Paraguay. São Paulo would reach the final of the Supercopa Libertadores a year later, which they won against Flamengo. After a 4–4 aggregate draw, the penalty shoot-out at the Estádio do Morumbi went in favour of the host team 5–3.

River Plate had first won the Copa Libertadores in 1986, when they beat Colombian team América de Cali on both legs of the final. Therefore, they had played in every season of the Supercopa Libertadores since 1988. During their run in the first edition of the tournament, River Plate defeated Club Olimpia and Grêmio, but fell short in their semi-final match against Racing Club, to whom they suffered a 3–2 loss on the aggregate. They would eventually qualify for the 1991 final, which they lost to Cruzeiro. The first leg went in their favour 2–0, but their opposition managed a 3–0 comeback to take the match.

== Route to the finals ==
The competition proper started with the group stage, contested as four double round-robin groups of four teams, with the winner of each group advancing to the knockout stages. The semi-final and final knockout stage ties were decided based on home and away matches.

(Brazil) São Paulo				Round	(Argentina) River Plate			
Opponent	Result			Group stage	Opponent	Result		
(Brazil) Flamengo	2–3 (A)			Matchday 1	(Argentina) Racing Club	3–2 (H)		
(Argentina) Vélez Sarsfield	5–1 (H)			Matchday 2	(Brazil) Santos	3–2 (H)		
(Paraguay) Olimpia	0–0 (A)			Matchday 3	(Brazil) Vasco da Gama	5–1 (H)		
(Brazil) Flamengo	1–0 (H)			Matchday 4	(Argentina) Racing Club	3–2 (A)		
(Argentina) Vélez Sarsfield	3–3 (A)			Matchday 5	(Brazil) Santos	1–2 (A)		
(Paraguay) Olimpia	4–1 (H)			Matchday 6	(Brazil) Vasco da Gama	2–0 (A) (Note: The match between Vasco da Gama and River Plate on 30 October was abandoned in the 70th minute after local fans tossed a rock that collisioned with linesman Juan Riquelme.)		
Group 2 winner: Pos / Team / Pld / Pts; 1 / (Brazil) São Paulo / 6 / 11; 2 / (Brazil) Flamengo / 6 / 10; 3 / (Paraguay) Olimpia / 6 / 6; 4 / (Argentina) Vélez Sarsfield / 6 / 5; Source: RSSSF				Final standings	Group 3 winner: Pos / Team / Pld / Pts; 1 / (Argentina) River Plate / 6 / 15; 2 / (Brazil) Vasco da Gama / 6 / 10; 3 / (Brazil) Santos / 6 / 7; 4 / (Argentina) Racing / 6 / 2; Source: RSSSF			
Opponent	Agg.	1st leg	2nd leg	Knockout stage	Opponent	Agg.	1st leg	2nd leg
(Chile) Colo-Colo	4–1	3–1 (H)	1–0 (A)	Semi-finals	(Colombia) Atlético Nacional	3–2	2–0 (H)	1–2 (A)

=== São Paulo ===
São Paulo entered the competition in the group stage. They were drawn in Group 2 alongside Flamengo, Olimpia and Vélez Sarsfield. São Paulo lost 3–2 their opening match at the Estádio do Maracanã, but proceeded to win their two following home fixtures, with a resounding victory against Vélez Sarsfield and a close 1–0 affair against their fellow Brazilian team Flamengo. After the latter failed to secure a 3–1 advantage on their fifth matchday, São Paulo were given the chance to qualify if they earned a victory in their final fixture. They would win 4–1 against Olimpia, topping their group and reaching the knockout stage.

Their opponent in the semi-finals would be Colo-Colo of Chile, who finished in first position of Group 1. The first leg would go 3–1 in favour of São Paulo at the Estádio do Morumbi, courtesy of goals from Fabiano, Víctor Aristizábal and Dodô. Colo-Colo would pull one back through Ivo Basay, who later had a penalty stopped by Rogério Ceni. The second leg at the Estadio Monumental David Arellano would also result in a São Paulo win, after Dodô scored the lone goal of the game in stoppage time.

=== River Plate ===
River Plate also entered the competition in the group stage. The draw determined they would be playing Vasco da Gama, Santos and Racing Club in Group 3. They would earn 12 points over their first four matchdays, following a pair of 3–2 home victories against Racing Club and Santos, a 5–1 rout against Vasco da Gama, and another 3–2 away win against their fellow Argentine side. A triumph at Santos' Vila Belmiro would have sent them into the semi-finals with a game to spare, but they were denied after sustaining a 2–1 loss. As a result, the first and second place of Group 3 were to be decided at Vasco da Gama's home ground. At the São Januário, River Plate earned a 2–0 victory that qualified them to the next stage.

Their first knockout stage match would be against Atlético Nacional of Colombia, winners of Group 4. The opening leg played at River Plate's Estadio Monumental was won by the home side 2–0, after Chilean striker Marcelo Salas scored a brace in the first half. The return leg hosted at the Estadio Atanasio Girardot ended 2–1 to Atlético Nacional, but a 3–2 aggregate ensured the visitors reached the finals.

== First leg ==
=== Summary ===
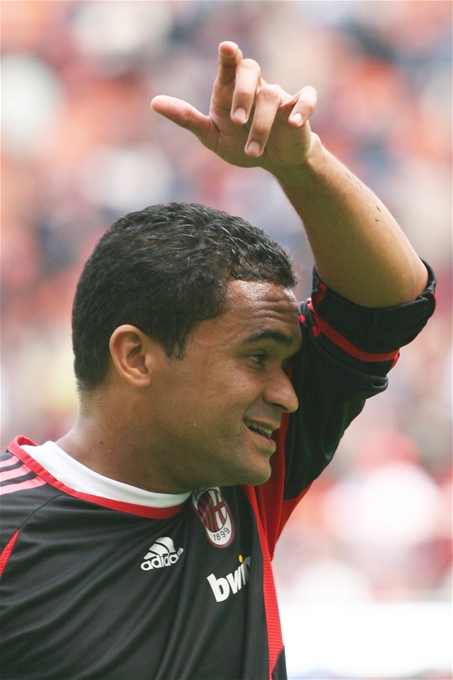
Serginho almost opened the scoring from an individual effort.

The first leg was held at the Estádio do Morumbi, the home ground of São Paulo. The home side attempted to exert pressure from the first whistle, and had their first opportunity just two minutes into the match. Marcelinho Paraíba ran down his flank and crossed for Fabiano, who was unable to shoot on target. River Plate responded swiftly through right-back Hernán Díaz, whose delivery met Enzo Francescoli, although the striker also failed to capitalize. The visitors started to gradually prevail, as they pressed upon their opposition's build-up. Another scoring prospect arose for their side in the tenth minute, when Marcelo Salas, after a cross from Marcelo Gallardo, headed wide while unmarked. São Paulo were rendered unable to muster any attack, product of a lack of coordination and their opposition's reliance on fouls to prevent their efforts. They began to count on sporadic runs by full-backs Zé Carlos and Serginho to dictate their plays. The latter missed the last chance for his team in the opening half, when he shot wide across the goal in the 43rd minute. Moments later, River Plate were given an opportunity to score after Roberto Monserrat recovered possession of the ball. The midfielder sorted it out to Salas, whose cross to Francescoli was intercepted by Edmílson.

The second half gave way to a São Paulo strategy that involved a more aggressive attacking approach, which ended up being mainly reliant on crosses. Just two minutes into the half, River Plate midfielder Sergio Berti received a straight red card following a disqualifying tackle on Fabiano. This prompted the visitors to renege from attacking, choosing instead to adopt a defensive scheme based on retaining possession and avoiding taking risks. Although a man up, São Paulo remained adamant on sending deliveries into the box, which centre-backs Celso Ayala and Eduardo Berizzo repeatedly repelled. In response, home side manager Darío Pereyra would sub in attacking midfielder Reinaldo for defender Álvaro, looking to better their offensive efforts and break the deadlock. As a result, Sidney was moved back to the defense, and the home side began to play with only one defensive midfielder. River Plate's Ramón Díaz immediately replied to this change. He substituted Francescoli for defender Diego Placente, as they continued to rely on a strong defensive effort in order to remain the score. São Paulo were unable to improve under the new formation, but they would have two last chances. At the 75-minute mark, Serginho followed up on an individual play by taking a shot that rattled the crossbar. Seven minutes later, a França shot hit the post. Their offensive game plan was unable to pose any further threat, and River Plate managed to hold on to the draw.

=== Details ===
December 4, 1997
21:40 UTC−3

São Paulo (Brazil)	0–0	(Argentina) River Plate
	RSSSF CONMEBOL

Estádio do Morumbi, São Paulo
Attendance: 45,413
Referee: Mario Sánchez Yanten (Chile)

São Paulo	River Plate

GK	1	(Brazil) Rogério Ceni (c)
DF	13	(Brazil) Zé Carlos
DF	15	(Brazil) Edmílson
DF	14	(Brazil) Álvaro		(substituted off) 61'
DF	6	(Brazil) Serginho
MF	8	(Brazil) Alexandre
MF	5	(Brazil) Sidney	Booked
MF	7	(Brazil) Fabiano
MF	23	(Brazil) Marcelinho Paraíba
FW	9	(Brazil) França		(substituted off) 85'
FW	10	(Brazil) Dodô
Substitutes:
MF	22	(Brazil) Reinaldo		(substituted on) 61'
MF	19	(Brazil) Fábio Mello		(substituted on) 85'
Manager:
(Uruguay) Darío Pereyra

GK	1	(Argentina) Germán Burgos
DF	4	(Argentina) Hernán Díaz
DF	2	(Paraguay) Celso Ayala
DF	6	(Argentina) Eduardo Berizzo
DF	3	(Argentina) Juan Pablo Sorín		(substituted off) 55'
MF	5	(Argentina) Leonardo Astrada		(substituted off) 82'
MF	8	(Argentina) Roberto Monserrat	Booked
MF	10	(Argentina) Marcelo Gallardo	Booked
MF	11	(Argentina) Sergio Berti	(red card) 48'
FW	7	(Chile) Marcelo Salas
FW	9	(Uruguay) Enzo Francescoli (c)		(substituted off) 62'
Substitutes:
MF	14	(Argentina) Marcelo Escudero		(substituted on) 55'
MF	25	(Argentina) Diego Placente		(substituted on) 62'
MF	15	(Argentina) Leonel Gancedo		(substituted on) 82'
Manager:
(Argentina) Ramón Díaz

Assistant referees
Eduardo Gamboa (Chile)
Jaime Alejandro Toro (Chile)

== Second leg ==
=== Summary ===
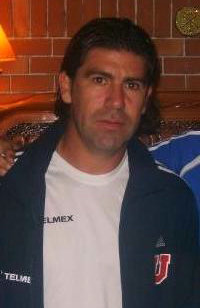
Marcelo Salas scored twice to give River Plate the Supercopa trophy.

At the Estadio Monumental, São Paulo started the game by applying pressure. Thanks to their superior ball control and fast-paced plays, they managed to funnel danger through Serginho and Alexandre, although failing to put any shots on target. Nonetheless, the first scoring chance fell to River Plate nearing the tenth minute; referee Ubaldo Aquino pointed to a handball by defender Álvaro after a cross, and awarded a penalty to the home side. Enzo Francescoli stepped up to take the penalty, but his effort was denied by Roger, who dived to his left. The São Paulo goalkeeper kept the match level once again in the 21st minute, when he prevented an own goal by teammate Edmílson. At the half-hour mark, midfielder Marcelinho Paraíba was sent off as a result of an accumulation of cards, leaving the visitors a player down. However, both sides remained unable to score, and the half ended goalless.

During the interval, River Plate manager Ramón Díaz told his team to focus on getting behind the São Paulo full-backs, who kept pushing forward. Just a minute after the restart, pressing high earned them the opening goal as Marcelo Salas recovered possession and passed to Gallardo, who went on to orchestrate an attack. Gallardo then filtered the ball over to Francescoli, who looked up and sent a cross that Salas finished to give River Plate the lead. Not long after, Aquino missed a possible penalty for São Paulo, and ruled instead a back pass to goalkeeper Germán Burgos, awarding a free kick inside the area. The visitors went on to score from the set piece, but the goal was disallowed after the referee indicated Burgos had stepped forward before the play resumed. On the follow-up chance, São Paulo managed to equalise through Dodô, who unleashed a long-range shot to make it 1–1. Nonetheless, River Plate returned the favour with another swift response: in the 57th minute, Diego Placente anticipated a play in defense and played the ball for Salas, who controlled it past Edmílson and Álvaro, and then beat Roger, who had stepped forward to try to deny him. At the 75-minute mark, the home side were also reduced to ten players, as Leonardo Astrada received a second booking and was consequently sent off. In response, Ramón Díaz subbed in fellow midfielder Leonel Gancedo, as they looked to stabilize. They continued to create scoring prospects, following two efforts in quick succession from Salas and Juan Pablo Sorín, which Roger successfully fended off. Ultimately, neither team managed to score any further goals, and Aquino blew for full-time with the final result of 2–1 to River Plate.

=== Details ===
December 17, 1997
22:10 UTC−3

River Plate (Argentina)	2–1	(Brazil) São Paulo
Salas 46', 57'	RSSSF CONMEBOL	Dodô 51'

Estadio Monumental, Buenos Aires
Attendance: 59,180
Referee: Ubaldo Aquino (Paraguay)

River Plate	São Paulo

GK	1	(Argentina) Germán Burgos	(yellow card) 50'
DF	4	(Argentina) Hernán Díaz	(yellow card) 33'
DF	2	(Paraguay) Celso Ayala	(yellow card) 64'
DF	6	(Argentina) Eduardo Berizzo
DF	25	(Argentina) Diego Placente		(substituted off) 81'
MF	5	(Argentina) Leonardo Astrada	(yellow card) (yellow-red card) 75'
MF	8	(Argentina) Roberto Monserrat
MF	10	(Argentina) Marcelo Gallardo		(substituted off) 86'
MF	3	(Argentina) Juan Pablo Sorín
FW	7	(Chile) Marcelo Salas
FW	9	(Uruguay) Enzo Francescoli (c)	(yellow card) 22'	(substituted off) 77'
Substitutes:
MF	15	(Argentina) Leonel Gancedo		(substituted on) 77'
MF	14	(Argentina) Marcelo Escudero		(substituted on) 81'
MF	21	(Argentina) Santiago Solari		(substituted on) 86'
Manager:
(Argentina) Ramón Díaz

GK	12	(Brazil) Roger
DF	13	(Brazil) Zé Carlos
DF	15	(Brazil) Edmílson	(yellow card) 90'
DF	14	(Brazil) Álvaro
DF	6	(Brazil) Serginho (c)
MF	8	(Brazil) Alexandre	(yellow card) 6'	(substituted off) 82'
MF	5	(Brazil) Sidney
MF	7	(Brazil) Fabiano		(substituted off) 68'
MF	23	(Brazil) Marcelinho Paraíba	(yellow card) (yellow-red card) 30'
FW	24	(Colombia) Víctor Aristizábal		(substituted off) 60'
FW	10	(Brazil) Dodô
Substitutes:
MF	22	(Brazil) Reinaldo		(substituted on) 60'
DF	2	(Brazil) Cláudio		(substituted on) 68'
MF	19	(Brazil) Fábio Mello		(substituted on) 82'
Manager:
(Uruguay) Darío Pereyra

Assistant referees
Bonifacio Nuñez (Paraguay)
Nelson González (Paraguay)

== Post-match ==
River Plate manager Ramón Díaz was euphoric after the win. In the midst of celebration, he stated: "This team is top-notch; it's a huge satisfaction to be a part of it. I owe everything to these players and to the fans." He also reflected on the game: "We showed what we're made of. We won by displaying great prowess in our football [...] Exactly how we meant to do it."

The São Paulo side, for their part, showed disappointment following the loss. Midfielder Paulo Silas, albeit unable to play in the match, criticized referee Ubaldo Aquino: "They didn't respect us. The referee gave the penalty from midfield. Even if we played for 15 hours, São Paulo wouldn't win this final. Aquino didn't deserve to referee this game." Darío Pereyra followed up by accusing the match official of underperforming: "I don't like to talk about the refereeing, but I can't help but say I was not satisfied at all with his performance."

Chilean striker Marcelo Salas scored four goals during the Supercopa Libertadores knockout stages, allowing his team to be crowned champions of the tournament for the first time. In total, he had scored seven goals during the competition, placing just behind Ivo Basay on the top scoring list. Among other merits, one of them being the top scorer for River Plate in the 1997 Torneo Apertura, Salas won the South American Footballer of the Year award.

The finals of the Supercopa Libertadores occurred within a packed domestic schedule for River Plate, who were competing alongside Boca Juniors for the Torneo Apertura. Four days after the second leg, Salas would score on a 1–1 draw against Argentinos Juniors to steer one point clear of their second-placed rivals and win the Argentine league for the third consecutive time. In turn, São Paulo had finished 12th in the first phase of the Campeonato Brasileiro Série A, and thus were unqualified to enter the league play-offs.

== See also ==
- 1997 Copa Libertadores finals
- 1997 São Paulo FC season
- São Paulo FC in international football
