= River Plate in international football =

South American professional football club

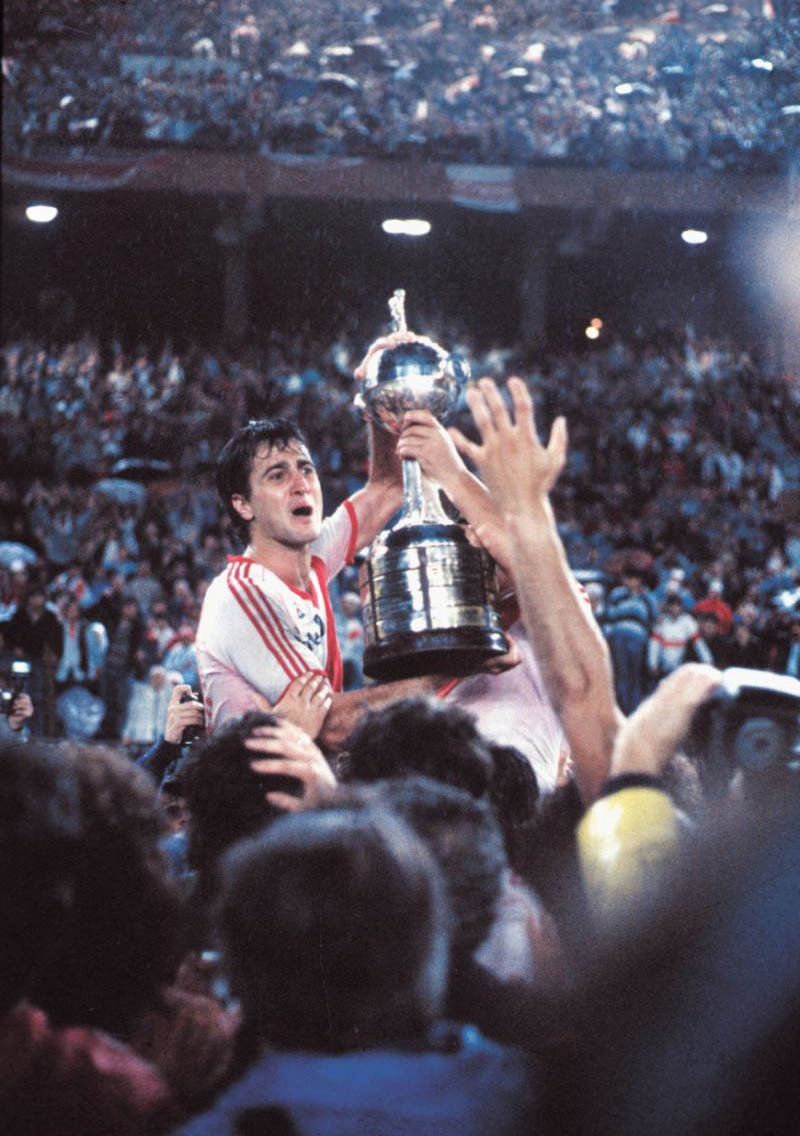
- River Plate's Norberto Alonso with the Copa Libertadores trophy won in the 1986 finals.
- Club: River Plate
- Seasons played: 47
- Most appearances: (Argentina) Hernán Díaz (116)
- Top scorer: (Argentina) Daniel Onega (31)
- First entry: 1914 Tie Cup
- Latest entry: 2026 Copa Sudamericana

Titles
- Intercontinental Cup: 1: 1986
- Copa Libertadores: 4: 1986; 1996; 2015; 2018
- Copa Sudamericana: 1: 2014
- Recopa Sudamericana: 3: 2015; 2016; 2019
- Supercopa Libertadores: 1: 1997
- Suruga Bank Championship: 1: 2015
- Copa Interamericana: 1: 1986

Club Atlético River Plate is a professional football club in Confederación Sudamericana de Fútbol (CONMEBOL) competitions. Since 1914, they have won eighteen AFA-AUF, South American and Worldwide trophies. These consist of the Copa Aldao five times, the Copa Libertadores four times, and the Intercontinental Cup. They have also won the Recopa Sudamericana three times, and once the Tie Cup, the Copa Sudamericana, the Supercopa Libertadores, the Suruga Bank Championship, and the Copa Interamericana.

Prior to the first continental tournament held by CONMEBOL, River Plate was one of many clubs to compete in the competitions ran jointly by Argentine and Uruguayan football associations. They participated seven times in the Copa Aldao, being the most successful team with five titles, and the Tie Cup, which they also won in 1914.

The South American governing body organised its first official tournament in 1960, when they introduced the Copa Libertadores. Since their first participation in 1966, River Plate have competed in at least one continental competition over the course of 47 different seasons. During this time, they achieved 11 international titles and one Worldwide honour.

At international level, Marcelo Gallardo is the club's most successful manager, with seven trophies. Their biggest-margin win is a 9–0 victory over Universitario de La Paz in the 1970 Copa Libertadores. Defender Hernán Díaz holds the club record for the most appearances, with 116, and Daniel Onega is the club's record goalscorer, with 31 goals.

== Records ==
As of 20 May 2026

- Most appearances in international competition: Hernán Díaz, 116
- Most goals in international competition: Daniel Onega, 31
- Most goals in a season: Daniel Onega, 17 (during the 1966 season)
- First match: River Plate 1–0 Bristol, Tie Cup final, 20 December 1914
- First goal: Juan Bautista Gianetto, v Bristol
- Biggest win: River Plate 9–0 Universitario de La Paz, in the 1970 Copa Libertadores, 11 March 1970
- Biggest defeat: Fluminense 5–1 River Plate, in the 2023 Copa Libertadores, 2 May 2023
- Youngest player to play in international competition: Franco Mastantuono, 16 years, 253 days (against Club Libertad, 24 April 2024)
- Youngest goalscorer in international competition: Franco Mastantuono, 16 years, 253 days (against Club Libertad, 24 April 2024)

=== By season ===
Key

- Pld = Matches played
- W = Matches won
- D = Matches drawn
- L = Matches lost
- GF = Goals for
- GA = Goals against
- S1 = First stage
- S2 = Second stage
- GS = Group stage
- R16 = Round of 16
- QF = Quarter-finals
- SF = Semi-finals

Key to colours:

Gold	Winners
Silver	Runners-up

River Plate record in international football by season
Season	Competition	Pld	W	D	L	GF	GA	Round
1914	Tie Cup	1	1	0	0	1	0	Winners
1936	Copa Aldao	1	1	0	0	5	1	Winners
1937	Copa Aldao	1	1	0	0	5	2	Winners
1941	Copa Aldao	2	1	1	0	7	2	Winners
1942	Copa Aldao	1	0	0	1	0	4	— (Note: The second leg of the 1942 Copa Aldao was never held. As a result of winning the first leg, Nacional were the virtual champions, but no winner was proclaimed.)
1945	Copa Aldao	2	2	0	0	5	3	Winners
1947	Copa Aldao	2	2	0	0	7	4	Winners
1957	Copa Aldao	1	1	0	0	2	1	— (Note: The second leg of the 1957 Copa Aldao was never held. As a result of winning the first leg, River Plate were the virtual champions, but no winner was proclaimed.)
1966	Copa Libertadores	20	13	3	4	43	25	Runners-up
1967	Copa Libertadores	16	6	6	4	33	17	S2
1970	Copa Libertadores	12	6	2	4	25	15	SF
1973	Copa Libertadores	6	2	1	3	12	9	S1
1976	Copa Libertadores	14	9	1	4	20	12	Runners-up
1977	Copa Libertadores	6	1	4	1	5	5	S1
1978	Copa Libertadores	10	4	4	2	12	5	S2
1980	Copa Libertadores	7	4	3	0	11	4	S1
1981	Copa Libertadores	6	3	1	2	9	6	S1
1982	Copa Libertadores	10	5	1	4	14	14	S2
1986	Copa Libertadores	13	9	3	1	23	8	Winners
1986	Intercontinental Cup	1	1	0	0	1	0	Winners
1986	Copa Interamericana	2	1	1	0	3	0	Winners
1987	Copa Libertadores	4	1	2	1	2	2	S2
1988	Supercopa Libertadores	6	2	1	3	9	7	SF
1989	Supercopa Libertadores	2	1	0	1	3	3	R16
1990	Copa Libertadores	8	4	2	2	8	5	SF
1990	Supercopa Libertadores	2	1	0	1	3	3	R16
1991	Copa Libertadores	6	2	1	3	10	12	GS
1991	Supercopa Libertadores	8	4	2	2	12	9	Runners-up
1992	Supercopa Libertadores	4	3	0	1	7	3	QF
1993	Copa Libertadores	6	1	3	2	4	5	GS
1993	Supercopa Libertadores	4	3	0	1	6	4	QF
1994	Supercopa Libertadores	4	1	3	0	4	3	QF
1995	Copa Libertadores	12	5	5	2	17	8	SF
1995	Supercopa Libertadores	6	2	2	2	11	11	SF
1996	Copa Libertadores	14	8	4	2	26	12	Winners
1996	Supercopa Libertadores	2	0	1	1	3	4	R16
1996	Intercontinental Cup	1	0	0	1	0	1	Runners-up
1997	Recopa Sudamericana	1	0	1	0	1	1	Runners-up
1997	Copa Libertadores	2	0	2	0	4	4	R16
1997	Supercopa Libertadores	10	7	1	2	22	12	Winners
1998	Copa Libertadores	12	8	3	1	23	11	SF
1998	Copa Mercosur	8	2	3	3	9	11	QF
1998	Recopa Sudamericana	2	0	0	2	0	5	Runners-up
1999	Copa Libertadores	12	5	2	5	12	13	SF
1999	Copa Mercosur	6	2	1	3	8	11	GS
2000	Copa Libertadores	10	5	3	2	18	13	QF
2000	Copa Mercosur	10	6	2	2	17	14	SF
2001	Copa Libertadores	10	5	1	4	18	11	QF
2001	Copa Mercosur	6	2	2	2	13	10	GS
2002	Copa Libertadores	8	2	3	3	9	10	R16
2002	Copa Sudamericana	2	0	1	1	0	1	R16
2003	Copa Libertadores	10	7	0	3	17	14	QF
2003	Copa Sudamericana	8	4	1	3	16	8	Runners-up
2004	Copa Libertadores	12	7	2	3	18	11	SF
2004	Copa Sudamericana	2	0	1	1	1	2	R16
2005	Copa Libertadores	12	7	2	3	23	17	SF
2005	Copa Sudamericana	2	0	2	0	1	1	R16
2006	Copa Libertadores	12	7	1	4	27	18	QF
2006	Copa Sudamericana	2	0	1	1	2	3	R16
2007	Copa Libertadores	6	2	2	2	5	6	GS
2007	Copa Sudamericana	6	1	4	1	6	5	SF
2008	Copa Libertadores	8	4	1	3	17	12	R16
2008	Copa Sudamericana	4	2	1	1	7	6	QF
2009	Copa Libertadores	6	2	1	3	7	9	GS
2009	Copa Sudamericana	2	0	0	2	1	3	S1
2013	Copa Sudamericana	6	2	2	2	5	5	QF
2014	Copa Sudamericana	10	8	2	0	17	5	Winners
2015	Recopa Sudamericana	2	2	0	0	2	0	Winners
2015	Copa Libertadores	14	5	7	2	18	9	Winners
2015	Suruga Bank Championship	1	1	0	0	3	0	Winners
2015	Copa Sudamericana	6	2	1	3	8	7	SF
2015	FIFA Club World Cup	2	1	0	1	1	3	Runners-up
2016	Copa Libertadores	8	4	2	2	18	9	R16
2016	Recopa Sudamericana	2	1	1	0	2	1	Winners
2017	Copa Libertadores	12	7	2	3	28	17	SF
2018	Copa Libertadores	14	7	6	1	19	9	Winners
2018	FIFA Club World Cup	2	1	1	0	6	2	SF
2019	Copa Libertadores	13	4	7	2	16	9	Runners-up
2019	Recopa Sudamericana	2	1	0	1	3	1	Winners
2020	Copa Libertadores	12	8	2	2	33	12	SF
2021	Copa Libertadores	10	3	4	3	10	12	QF
2022	Copa Libertadores	8	5	2	1	18	4	R16
2023	Copa Libertadores	8	4	1	3	14	14	R16
2024	Copa Libertadores	12	8	3	1	15	8	SF
2025	Copa Libertadores	10	3	5	2	16	13	QF
2025	FIFA Club World Cup	3	1	1	1	3	3	GS

=== By competition ===
River Plate record in international football by competition
Competition	Pld	W	D	L	GF	GA	Win%
Copa Libertadores	412	202	111	99	681	431	49.03
Copa Sudamericana	50	19	16	15	64	47	38.00
Recopa Sudamericana	9	4	2	3	8	8	44.44
Copa Interamericana	2	1	1	0	3	0	50.00
Supercopa Libertadores	48	24	10	14	80	59	50.00
Copa Mercosur	30	12	8	10	47	46	40.00
Suruga Bank Championship	1	1	0	0	3	0	100.00
Tie Cup	1	1	0	0	1	0	100.00
Copa Aldao	10	8	1	1	31	17	80.00
Intercontinental Cup	2	1	0	1	1	1	50.00
FIFA Club World Cup	7	3	2	2	10	8	42.86
Total	572	276	151	145	929	617	48.25

=== By country ===
River Plate record in international football by country
Country	Pld	W	D	L	GF	GA	GD	Win%
Argentina	140	51	56	33	155	125	+30	36.43
Bolivia	34	22	6	6	95	31	+64	64.71
Brazil	110	37	26	47	143	167	−24	33.64
Chile	24	15	6	3	41	18	+23	62.50
Colombia	48	27	9	12	78	49	+29	56.25
Costa Rica	2	1	1	0	3	0	+3	50.00
Ecuador	40	21	8	11	66	40	+26	52.50
Italy	2	0	0	2	0	3	−3	0.00
Japan	4	4	0	0	11	1	+10	100.00
Mexico	19	5	9	5	22	22	+0	26.32
Peru	38	24	9	5	100	41	+59	63.16
Paraguay	38	22	8	8	64	32	+32	57.89
Romania	1	1	0	0	1	0	+1	100.00
Spain	1	0	0	1	0	3	−3	0.00
United Arab Emirates	1	0	1	0	2	2	+0	0.00
Uruguay	52	32	12	8	107	63	+44	61.54
Venezuela	22	18	2	2	50	16	+34	81.82

=== Overall results ===
Season	Competition	Round	Opponent	Home	Away	Agg.
1914	Tie Cup	Final	(Uruguay) Bristol	1–0		
1937	Copa Aldao	Final	(Uruguay) Peñarol	5–1		
1938	Copa Aldao	Final	(Uruguay) Peñarol	5–2		
1942	Copa Aldao	Final	(Uruguay) Nacional	6–1	1–1	7–2
1945	Copa Aldao	Final	(Uruguay) Peñarol	3–2	2–1	5–3
1947	Copa Aldao	Final	(Uruguay) Nacional	3–1	4–3	7–4
1966	Copa Libertadores	GS1	(Argentina) Boca Juniors	2–1	0–2	1st out of 6
1966	Copa Libertadores	GS1	(Venezuela) Deportivo Lara	3–0	2–1	1st out of 6
1966	Copa Libertadores	GS1	(Venezuela) Deportivo Italia	2–1	3–0	1st out of 6
1966	Copa Libertadores	GS1	(Peru) Universitario	5–0	1–1	1st out of 6
1966	Copa Libertadores	GS1	(Peru) Alianza Lima	3–2	2–0	1st out of 6
1966	Copa Libertadores	GS2	(Paraguay) Club Guaraní	3–1	3–1	1st out of 4
1966	Copa Libertadores	GS2	(Argentina) Independiente	4–2	1–1	1st out of 4
1966	Copa Libertadores	GS2	(Argentina) Boca Juniors	2–2	0–1	1st out of 4
1966	Copa Libertadores	TB	(Argentina) Independiente	2–1 (a.e.t.)		
1966	Copa Libertadores	Final	(Uruguay) Peñarol	3–2	0–2	3–4 (po 2–4)
1967	Copa Libertadores	GS1	(Argentina) Racing Club	0–0	0–2	2nd out of 6
1967	Copa Libertadores	GS1	(Bolivia) Club Bolívar	2–0	3–3	2nd out of 6
1967	Copa Libertadores	GS1	(Bolivia) 31 de Octubre	7–0	4–0	2nd out of 6
1967	Copa Libertadores	GS1	(Colombia) Independiente Santa Fe	4–0	2–2	2nd out of 6
1967	Copa Libertadores	GS1	(Colombia) Independiente Medellín	6–2	1–0	2nd out of 6
1967	Copa Libertadores	GS2	(Argentina) Racing Club	0–0	1–3	3rd out of 4
1967	Copa Libertadores	GS2	(Chile) Colo-Colo	1–1	0–1	3rd out of 4
1967	Copa Libertadores	GS2	(Peru) Universitario	0–1	2–2	3rd out of 4
1970	Copa Libertadores	GS1	(Argentina) Boca Juniors	1–3	1–2	2nd out of 4
1970	Copa Libertadores	GS1	(Bolivia) Universitario de Sucre	9–0	2–0	2nd out of 4
1970	Copa Libertadores	GS1	(Bolivia) Club Bolívar	1–0	1–1	2nd out of 4
1970	Copa Libertadores	GS2	(Argentina) Boca Juniors	1–0	1–1	1st out of 3
1970	Copa Libertadores	GS2	(Peru) Universitario	5–3	2–1	1st out of 3
1970	Copa Libertadores	SF	(Argentina) Estudiantes (LP)	0–1	1–3	1–4
1973	Copa Libertadores	GS1	(Bolivia) Oriente Petrolero	7–1	3–1	3rd out of 4
1973	Copa Libertadores	GS1	(Bolivia) Jorge Wilstermann	2–2	0–1	3rd out of 4
1973	Copa Libertadores	GS1	(Argentina) San Lorenzo	0–4	0–1	3rd out of 4
1976	Copa Libertadores	GS1	(Argentina) Estudiantes (LP)	1–0	0–1	1st out of 4
1976	Copa Libertadores	GS1	(Venezuela) Deportivo Galicia	4–1	1–0	1st out of 4
1976	Copa Libertadores	GS1	(Venezuela) Portuguesa	2–1	2–0	1st out of 4
1976	Copa Libertadores	GS2	(Argentina) Independiente	0–0	1–0	1st out of 3
1976	Copa Libertadores	GS2	(Uruguay) Peñarol	3–0	0–1	1st out of 3
1976	Copa Libertadores	TB	(Argentina) Independiente	1–0		
1976	Copa Libertadores	Final	(Brazil) Cruzeiro	1–4	2–1	3–5 (po 2–3)
1977	Copa Libertadores	GS1	(Argentina) Boca Juniors	0–0	0–1	2nd out of 4
1977	Copa Libertadores	GS1	(Uruguay) Peñarol	2–1	2–2	2nd out of 4
1977	Copa Libertadores	GS1	(Uruguay) Defensor Sporting	1–1	0–0	2nd out of 4
1978	Copa Libertadores	GS1	(Ecuador) El Nacional	2–0	1–1	1st out of 4
1978	Copa Libertadores	GS1	(Ecuador) Liga de Quito	4–0	0–0	1st out of 4
1978	Copa Libertadores	GS1	(Argentina) Independiente	0–0	0–0	1st out of 4
1978	Copa Libertadores	TB	(Argentina) Independiente	4–1		
1978	Copa Libertadores	GS2	(Argentina) Boca Juniors	0–2	0–0	2nd out of 3
1978	Copa Libertadores	GS2	(Brazil) Atlético Mineiro	1–0	0–1	2nd out of 3
1980	Copa Libertadores	GS1	(Argentina) Vélez Sarsfield	0–0	0–0	2nd out of 4
1980	Copa Libertadores	GS1	(Peru) Sporting Cristal	3–2	2–1	2nd out of 4
1980	Copa Libertadores	GS1	(Peru) Atlético Chalaco	3–0	2–0	2nd out of 4
1980	Copa Libertadores	TB	(Argentina) Vélez Sarsfield	1–1 (a.e.t.)		
1981	Copa Libertadores	GS1	(Argentina) Rosario Central	3–2	1–0	2nd out of 4
1981	Copa Libertadores	GS1	(Colombia) Junior	3–0	0–0	2nd out of 4
1981	Copa Libertadores	GS1	(Colombia) Deportivo Cali	1–2	1–2	2nd out of 4
1982	Copa Libertadores	GS1	(Bolivia) The Strongest	4–1	1–0	1st out of 4
1982	Copa Libertadores	GS1	(Argentina) Boca Juniors	1–0	0–0	1st out of 4
1982	Copa Libertadores	GS1	(Bolivia) Jorge Wilstermann	3–0	1–0	1st out of 4
1982	Copa Libertadores	GS2	(Brazil) Flamengo	0–3	2–4	3rd out of 3
1982	Copa Libertadores	GS2	(Uruguay) Peñarol	2–4	1–2	3rd out of 3
1985–86	Copa Libertadores	GS1	(Argentina) Boca Juniors	1–0	1–1	1st out of 4
1985–86	Copa Libertadores	GS1	(Uruguay) Montevideo Wanderers	4–2	2–0	1st out of 4
1985–86	Copa Libertadores	GS1	(Uruguay) Peñarol	3–1	2–0	1st out of 4
1985–86	Copa Libertadores	GS2	(Argentina) Argentinos Juniors	0–2	0–0	1st out of 3
1985–86	Copa Libertadores	GS2	(Ecuador) Barcelona	4–1	3–0	1st out of 3
1985–86	Copa Libertadores	TB	(Argentina) Argentinos Juniors	0–0 (a.e.t.)		
1985–86	Copa Libertadores	Final	(Colombia) América de Cali	2–1	1–0	3–1
1986–87	Intercontinental Cup	Final	(Romania) Steaua București	1–0		
1986–87	Copa Libertadores	GS2	(Argentina) Independiente	0–0	1–2	2nd out of 3
1986–87	Copa Libertadores	GS2	(Uruguay) Peñarol	1–0	0–0	2nd out of 3
1987–88	Copa Interamericana	Final	(Costa Rica) Alajuelense	3–0	0–0	3–0
1988–89	Supercopa Libertadores	R16	(Paraguay) Club Olimpia	4–0	0–2	4–2
1988–89	Supercopa Libertadores	QF	(Brazil) Grêmio	3–1	0–1	3–2
1988–89	Supercopa Libertadores	SF	(Argentina) Racing Club	1–1	1–2	2–3
1989–90	Supercopa Libertadores	R16	(Brazil) Grêmio	2–1	1–2	3–3 (4–5 p)
1989–90	Copa Libertadores	GS	(Argentina) Independiente	0–0	0–1	2nd out of 2
1989–90	Copa Libertadores	R16	(Uruguay) Defensor Sporting	2–1	2–1	4–2
1989–90	Copa Libertadores	QF	(Argentina) Independiente	2–0	1–1	3–1
1989–90	Copa Libertadores	SF	(Ecuador) Barcelona	1–0	0–1	1–1 (3–4 p)
1990–91	Supercopa Libertadores	R16	(Paraguay) Club Olimpia	3–0	0–3	3–3 (3–4 p)
1990–91	Copa Libertadores	GS	(Argentina) Boca Juniors	0–2	3–4	4th out of 4
1990–91	Copa Libertadores	GS	(Bolivia) Club Bolívar	2–0	1–4	4th out of 4
1990–91	Copa Libertadores	GS	(Bolivia) Oriente Petrolero	3–1	1–1	4th out of 4
1991–92	Supercopa Libertadores	R16	(Brazil) Grêmio	2–2	1–1	3–3 (4–3 p)
1991–92	Supercopa Libertadores	QF	(Brazil) Flamengo	1–0	1–2	2–2 (4–3 p)
1991–92	Supercopa Libertadores	SF	(Uruguay) Peñarol	2–0	3–1	5–1
1991–92	Supercopa Libertadores	Final	(Brazil) Cruzeiro	2–0	0–3	2–3
1992–93	Supercopa Libertadores	R16	(Argentina) Argentinos Juniors	3–0	2–1	5–1
1992–93	Supercopa Libertadores	QF	(Brazil) Cruzeiro	2–0	0–2	2–2 (4–5 p)
1992–93	Copa Libertadores	GS	(Argentina) Newell's Old Boys	0–1	0–0	4th out of 4
1992–93	Copa Libertadores	GS	(Paraguay) Cerro Porteño	1–1	1–2	4th out of 4
1992–93	Copa Libertadores	GS	(Paraguay) Club Olimpia	1–0	1–1	4th out of 4
1993–94	Supercopa Libertadores	R16	(Argentina) Argentinos Juniors	2–1	2–1	4–2
1993–94	Supercopa Libertadores	QF	(Brazil) Flamengo	2–1	0–1	2–2 (5–6 p)
1994–95	Supercopa Libertadores	R16	(Uruguay) Nacional	2–2	1–0	3–2
1994–95	Supercopa Libertadores	QF	(Argentina) Boca Juniors	0–0	1–1	1–1 (4–5 p)
1994–95	Copa Libertadores	GS	(Argentina) Independiente	2–0	1–1	1st out of 4
1994–95	Copa Libertadores	GS	(Uruguay) Cerro	5–0	1–0	1st out of 4
1994–95	Copa Libertadores	GS	(Uruguay) Peñarol	1–1	1–1	1st out of 4
1994–95	Copa Libertadores	R16	(Chile) Universidad Católica	3–1	1–2	4–3
1994–95	Copa Libertadores	QF	(Argentina) Vélez Sarsfield	1–1	0–0	1–1 (5–3 p)
1994–95	Copa Libertadores	SF	(Colombia) Atlético Nacional	1–0	0–1	1–1 (7–8 p)
1995–96	Supercopa Libertadores	R16	(Uruguay) Peñarol	2–3	3–2	5–5 (7–6 p)
1995–96	Supercopa Libertadores	QF	(Brazil) Grêmio	3–2	1–2	4–4 (4–2 p)
1995–96	Supercopa Libertadores	SF	(Argentina) Independiente	0–0	2–2	2–2 (1–4 p)
1995–96	Copa Libertadores	GS	(Argentina) San Lorenzo	0–0	1–1	1st out of 4
1995–96	Copa Libertadores	GS	(Venezuela) Minervén	5–0	2–1	1st out of 4
1995–96	Copa Libertadores	GS	(Venezuela) Caracas	2–0	4–1	1st out of 4
1995–96	Copa Libertadores	R16	(Peru) Sporting Cristal	5–2	1–2	6–4
1995–96	Copa Libertadores	QF	(Argentina) San Lorenzo	1–1	2–1	3–2
1995–96	Copa Libertadores	SF	Universidad de Chile	1–0	2–2	3–2
1995–96	Copa Libertadores	Final	(Colombia) América de Cali	2–0	0–1	2–1
1996–97	Supercopa Libertadores	R16	(Colombia) Atlético Nacional	2–2	1–2	3–4
1996–97	Intercontinental Cup	Final	(Italy) Juventus	0–1		
1996–97	Recopa Sudamericana	Final	(Argentina) Vélez Sarsfield	1–1 (2–4 p)		
1996–97	Copa Libertadores	R16	(Argentina) Racing Club	1–1	3–3	4–4 (3–5 p)
1997–98	Supercopa Libertadores	GS	(Argentina) Racing Club	3–2	3–2	1st out of 4
1997–98	Supercopa Libertadores	GS	(Brazil) Santos	3–2	1–2	1st out of 4
1997–98	Supercopa Libertadores	GS	(Brazil) Vasco da Gama	5–1	2–0	1st out of 4
1997–98	Supercopa Libertadores	SF	(Colombia) Atlético Nacional	2–0	1–2	3–2
1997–98	Supercopa Libertadores	Final	(Brazil) São Paulo	2–1	0–0	2–1
1997–98	Copa Libertadores	GS	(Argentina) Colón	4–1	2–1	1st out of 4
1997–98	Copa Libertadores	GS	(Peru) Alianza Lima	2–0	1–1	1st out of 4
1997–98	Copa Libertadores	GS	(Peru) Sporting Cristal	3–1	3–2	1st out of 4
1997–98	Copa Libertadores	R16	(Mexico) Club América	1–0	1–1	2–1
1997–98	Copa Libertadores	QF	(Argentina) Colón	2–1	3–1	5–2
1997–98	Copa Libertadores	SF	(Brazil) Vasco da Gama	1–1	0–1	1–2
1998–99	Copa Mercosur	GS	(Brazil) Grêmio	3–1	3–2	1st out of 4
1998–99	Copa Mercosur	GS	(Chile) Universidad Católica	2–0	1–1	1st out of 4
1998–99	Copa Mercosur	GS	(Brazil) Vasco da Gama	1–1	0–0	1st out of 4
1998–99	Copa Mercosur	QF	(Brazil) Cruzeiro	1–2	0–2	1–4
1998–99	Copa Libertadores	GS	(Argentina) Vélez Sarsfield	1–1	1–1	3rd out of 4
1998–99	Copa Libertadores	GS	(Colombia) Once Caldas	3–0	1–4	3rd out of 4
1998–99	Copa Libertadores	GS	(Colombia) Deportivo Cali	2–1	0–1	3rd out of 4
1998–99	Copa Libertadores	R16	(Ecuador) Liga de Quito	1–0	0–1	1–1 (5–4 p)
1998–99	Copa Libertadores	QF	(Argentina) Vélez Sarsfield	2–0	0–1	2–1
1998–99	Copa Libertadores	SF	(Brazil) Palmeiras	1–0	0–3	1–3
1999–2000	Copa Mercosur	GS	(Brazil) Palmeiras	3–3	0–3	3rd out of 4
1999–2000	Copa Mercosur	GS	(Brazil) Cruzeiro	0–3	0–2	3rd out of 4
1999–2000	Copa Mercosur	GS	(Argentina) Racing Club	4–0	1–0	3rd out of 4
1999–2000	Copa Libertadores	GS	(Mexico) Atlas	3–2	1–1	1st out of 4
1999–2000	Copa Libertadores	GS	Universidad de Chile	3–1	1–1	1st out of 4
1999–2000	Copa Libertadores	GS	(Colombia) Atlético Nacional	2–3	1–1	1st out of 4
1999–2000	Copa Libertadores	R16	(Paraguay) Cerro Porteño	1–0	4–0	5–0
1999–2000	Copa Libertadores	QF	(Argentina) Boca Juniors	2–1	0–3	2–4
2000–01	Copa Mercosur	GS	(Argentina) Vélez Sarsfield	2–1	1–1	1st out of 4
2000–01	Copa Mercosur	GS	(Brazil) Flamengo	0–0	2–1	1st out of 4
2000–01	Copa Mercosur	GS	Universidad de Chile	2–0	3–2	1st out of 4
2000–01	Copa Mercosur	QF	(Brazil) Flamengo	4–3	2–1	6–4
2000–01	Copa Mercosur	SF	(Brazil) Vasco da Gama	1–4	0–1	1–5
2000–01	Copa Libertadores	GS	(Bolivia) The Strongest	5–1	1–4	1st out of 4
2000–01	Copa Libertadores	GS	(Ecuador) El Nacional	2–0	0–1	1st out of 4
2000–01	Copa Libertadores	GS	(Paraguay) Club Guaraní	4–0	1–0	1st out of 4
2000–01	Copa Libertadores	R16	(Ecuador) Emelec	5–0	0–2	5–0
2000–01	Copa Libertadores	QF	(Mexico) Cruz Azul	0–0	0–3	2–4
2001–02	Copa Mercosur	GS	(Brazil) Grêmio	2–4	0–1	2nd out of 4
2001–02	Copa Mercosur	GS	(Brazil) Palmeiras	3–3	2–2	2nd out of 4
2001–02	Copa Mercosur	GS	Universidad de Chile	3–0	3–0	2nd out of 4
2001–02	Copa Libertadores	GS	(Argentina) Talleres	0–0	1–1	2nd out of 4
2001–02	Copa Libertadores	GS	(Mexico) Club América	0–1	0–0	2nd out of 4
2001–02	Copa Libertadores	GS	(Colombia) Cortuluá	2–0	5–2	2nd out of 4
2001–02	Copa Libertadores	R16	(Brazil) Grêmio	1–2	0–4	1–6
2002–03	Copa Sudamericana	R16	(Argentina) Racing Club	0–0	0–1	0–1
2002–03	Copa Libertadores	GS	(Colombia) Deportivo Cali	2–1	0–2	2nd out of 4
2002–03	Copa Libertadores	GS	(Paraguay) Club Libertad	3–1	2–0	2nd out of 4
2002–03	Copa Libertadores	GS	(Ecuador) Emelec	2–0	1–3	2nd out of 4
2002–03	Copa Libertadores	R16	(Brazil) Corinthians	2–1	2–1	4–2
2002–03	Copa Libertadores	QF	(Colombia) América de Cali	2–1	1–4	3–5
2003–04	Copa Sudamericana	R16	(Argentina) Independiente	4–0	4–1	8–1
2003–04	Copa Sudamericana	QF	(Paraguay) Club Libertad	2–0	0–1	2–1
2003–04	Copa Sudamericana	SF	(Brazil) São Paulo	3–1	0–2	3–3 (4–2 p)
2003–04	Copa Sudamericana	Final	(Peru) Cienciano	3–3	0–1	3–4
2003–04	Copa Libertadores	GS	(Venezuela) Deportivo Táchira	0–0	2–2	1st out of 4
2003–04	Copa Libertadores	GS	(Paraguay) Club Libertad	4–1	0–1	1st out of 4
2003–04	Copa Libertadores	GS	(Colombia) Deportes Tolima	1–0	3–2	1st out of 4
2003–04	Copa Libertadores	R16	(Mexico) Santos Laguna	1–2	1–0	2–2 (4–2 p)
2003–04	Copa Libertadores	QF	(Colombia) Deportivo Cali	1–0	3–1	4–1
2003–04	Copa Libertadores	SF	(Argentina) Boca Juniors	2–1	0–1	2–2 (4–5 p)
2004–05	Copa Sudamericana	R16	(Argentina) Arsenal	0–0	1–2	1–2
2004–05	Copa Libertadores	GS	(Ecuador) Olmedo	1–1	3–2	1st out of 4
2004–05	Copa Libertadores	GS	(Uruguay) Nacional	1–0	3–1	1st out of 4
2004–05	Copa Libertadores	GS	(Colombia) Junior	2–1	2–0	1st out of 4
2004–05	Copa Libertadores	R16	(Ecuador) Liga de Quito	4–2	1–2	5–4
2004–05	Copa Libertadores	QF	(Argentina) Banfield	3–2	1–1	4–3
2004–05	Copa Libertadores	SF	(Brazil) São Paulo	2–3	0–2	2–5
2005–06	Copa Sudamericana	R16	(Brazil) Corinthians	1–1	0–0	1–1 (a)
2005–06	Copa Libertadores	FS	(Bolivia) Oriente Petrolero	6–0	2–0	8–0
2005–06	Copa Libertadores	GS	(Paraguay) Club Libertad	1–0	0–2	2nd out of 4
2005–06	Copa Libertadores	GS	(Ecuador) El Nacional	4–3	0–2	2nd out of 4
2005–06	Copa Libertadores	GS	(Brazil) Paulista	4–1	1–2	2nd out of 4
2005–06	Copa Libertadores	R16	(Brazil) Corinthians	3–2	3–1	6–3
2005–06	Copa Libertadores	QF	(Paraguay) Club Libertad	2–2	1–3	3–5
2006–07	Copa Sudamericana	R16	(Brazil) Athletico Paranaense	0–1	2–2	2–3
2006–07	Copa Libertadores	GS	(Chile) Colo-Colo	1–0	2–1	4th out of 4
2006–07	Copa Libertadores	GS	(Venezuela) Caracas	0–1	1–3	4th out of 4
2006–07	Copa Libertadores	GS	(Ecuador) Liga de Quito	0–0	1–1	4th out of 4
2007–08	Copa Sudamericana	R16	(Brazil) Botafogo	4–2	0–1	4–3
2007–08	Copa Sudamericana	QF	(Uruguay) Defensor Sporting	0–0	2–2	2–2 (a)
2007–08	Copa Sudamericana	SF	(Argentina) Arsenal	0–0	0–0	0–0 (2–4 p)
2007–08	Copa Libertadores	GS	(Peru) Universidad San Martín	5–0	0–2	1st out of 4
2007–08	Copa Libertadores	GS	(Mexico) Club América	2–1	3–4	1st out of 4
2007–08	Copa Libertadores	GS	(Chile) Universidad Católica	2–0	2–1	1st out of 4
2007–08	Copa Libertadores	R16	(Argentina) San Lorenzo	2–2	1–2	3–4
2008–09	Copa Sudamericana	R16	(Uruguay) Defensor Sporting	2–1	2–1	4–2
2008–09	Copa Sudamericana	QF	(Mexico) Guadalajara	1–2	2–2	3–4
2008–09	Copa Libertadores	GS	(Paraguay) Club Nacional	1–0	2–4	3rd out of 4
2008–09	Copa Libertadores	GS	(Peru) Universidad San Martín	3–0	1–2	3rd out of 4
2008–09	Copa Libertadores	GS	(Uruguay) Nacional	0–0	0–3	3rd out of 4
2009–10	Copa Sudamericana	FS	(Argentina) Lanús	1–2	0–1	1–3
2013–14	Copa Sudamericana	R16	(Ecuador) Liga de Loja	2–0	1–2	3–2
2013–14	Copa Sudamericana	QF	(Argentina) Lanús	0–0	1–3	1–3
2014	Copa Sudamericana	SS	(Argentina) Godoy Cruz	2–0	1–0	3–0
2014	Copa Sudamericana	R16	(Paraguay) Club Libertad	2–0	3–1	5–1
2014	Copa Sudamericana	QF	(Argentina) Estudiantes (LP)	3–2	2–1	5–3
2014	Copa Sudamericana	SF	(Argentina) Boca Juniors	1–0	0–0	1–0
2014	Copa Sudamericana	Final	(Colombia) Atlético Nacional	2–0	1–1	3–1
2015	Recopa Sudamericana	Final	(Argentina) San Lorenzo	1–0	1–0	2–0
2015	Copa Libertadores	GS	(Bolivia) San José	3–0	0–2	2nd out of 4
2015	Copa Libertadores	GS	(Mexico) Tigres UANL	1–1	2–2	2nd out of 4
2015	Copa Libertadores	GS	(Peru) Juan Aurich	1–1	1–1	2nd out of 4
2015	Copa Libertadores	R16	(Argentina) Boca Juniors	1–0	0–0	1–0
2015	Copa Libertadores	QF	(Brazil) Cruzeiro	0–1	3–0	3–1
2015	Copa Libertadores	SF	(Paraguay) Club Guaraní	2–0	1–1	3–1
2015	Copa Libertadores	Final	(Mexico) Tigres UANL	3–0	0–0	3–0
2015	Suruga Bank Championship	Final	(Japan) Gamba Osaka	3–0		
2015	Copa Sudamericana	R16	(Ecuador) Liga de Quito	2–0	0–1	2–1
2015	Copa Sudamericana	QF	(Brazil) Chapecoense	3–1	1–2	4–3
2015	Copa Sudamericana	SF	(Argentina) Huracán	0–1	2–2	2–3
2015	FIFA Club World Cup	SF	(Japan) Sanfrecce Hiroshima	1–0		
2015	FIFA Club World Cup	Final	(Spain) Barcelona	0–3		
2016	Copa Libertadores	GS	(Venezuela) Trujillanos	4–3	4–0	2nd out of 4
2016	Copa Libertadores	GS	(Brazil) São Paulo	1–1	1–2	2nd out of 4
2016	Copa Libertadores	GS	(Bolivia) The Strongest	6–0	1–1	2nd out of 4
2016	Copa Libertadores	R16	(Ecuador) Independiente del Valle	1–0	0–2	1–2
2016	Recopa Sudamericana	Final	(Colombia) Independiente Santa Fe	2–1	0–0	2–1
2016–17	Copa Libertadores	GS	(Colombia) Independiente Medellín	1–2	3–1	1st out of 4
2016–17	Copa Libertadores	GS	(Peru) Melgar	4–2	3–2	1st out of 4
2016–17	Copa Libertadores	GS	(Ecuador) Emelec	1–1	2–1	1st out of 4
2016–17	Copa Libertadores	R16	(Paraguay) Club Guaraní	1–1	2–0	1–0
2016–17	Copa Libertadores	QF	(Bolivia) Jorge Wilstermann	8–0	0–3	3–1
2016–17	Copa Libertadores	SF	(Argentina) Lanús	1–0	2–4	3–4
2017–18	Copa Libertadores	GS	(Brazil) Flamengo	0–0	2–2	1st out of 4
2017–18	Copa Libertadores	GS	(Colombia) Independiente Santa Fe	0–0	1–0	1st out of 4
2017–18	Copa Libertadores	GS	(Ecuador) Emelec	2–1	1–0	1st out of 4
2017–18	Copa Libertadores	R16	(Argentina) Racing Club	3–0	0–0	3–0
2017–18	Copa Libertadores	QF	(Argentina) Independiente	3–1	0–0	3–1
2017–18	Copa Libertadores	SF	(Brazil) Grêmio	0–1	2–1	2–2 (a)
2017–18	Copa Libertadores	Final	(Argentina) Boca Juniors	3–1 (a.e.t.)	2–2	5–3
2018–19	Copa Libertadores	GS	(Peru) Alianza Lima	3–0	1–1	2nd out of 4
2018–19	Copa Libertadores	GS	(Chile) Palestino	0–0	2–0	2nd out of 4
2018–19	Copa Libertadores	GS	(Brazil) Internacional	2–2	2–2	2nd out of 4
2018–19	Copa Libertadores	R16	(Brazil) Cruzeiro	0–0	0–0	0–0 (4–2 p)
2018–19	Copa Libertadores	QF	(Paraguay) Cerro Porteño	2–0	1–1	3–1
2018–19	Copa Libertadores	SF	(Argentina) Boca Juniors	2–0	0–1	2–1
2018–19	Copa Libertadores	Final	(Brazil) Flamengo	1–2		
2018–19	Recopa Sudamericana	Final	(Brazil) Athletico Paranaense	3–0	0–1	3–1
2019–20	Copa Libertadores	GS	(Ecuador) Liga de Quito	3–0	0–3	1st out of 4
2019–20	Copa Libertadores	GS	(Peru) Deportivo Binacional	8–0	6–0	1st out of 4
2019–20	Copa Libertadores	GS	(Brazil) São Paulo	2–1	2–2	1st out of 4
2019–20	Copa Libertadores	R16	(Brazil) Athletico Paranaense	1–0	1–1	2–1
2019–20	Copa Libertadores	QF	(Uruguay) Nacional	2–0	6–2	8–2
2019–20	Copa Libertadores	SF	(Brazil) Palmeiras	0–3	2–0	2–3
2021	Copa Libertadores	GS	(Brazil) Fluminense	1–3	1–1	2nd out of 4
2021	Copa Libertadores	GS	(Colombia) Junior	2–1	1–1	2nd out of 4
2021	Copa Libertadores	GS	(Colombia) Independiente Santa Fe	2–1	0–0	2nd out of 4
2021	Copa Libertadores	R16	(Argentina) Argentinos Juniors	1–1	2–0	3–1
2021	Copa Libertadores	QF	(Brazil) Atlético Mineiro	0–1	0–3	0–4
2022	Copa Libertadores	GS	(Peru) Alianza Lima	8–1	1–0	1st out of 4
2022	Copa Libertadores	GS	(Brazil) Fortaleza	2–0	1–1	1st out of 4
2022	Copa Libertadores	GS	(Chile) Colo-Colo	4–0	2–1	1st out of 4
2022	Copa Libertadores	R16	(Argentina) Vélez Sarsfield	0–0	0–1	0–1
2023	Copa Libertadores	GS	(Bolivia) The Strongest	2–0	1–3	2nd out of 4
2023	Copa Libertadores	GS	(Peru) Sporting Cristal	4–2	1–1	2nd out of 4
2023	Copa Libertadores	GS	(Brazil) Fluminense	2–0	1–5	2nd out of 4
2023	Copa Libertadores	R16	(Brazil) Internacional	2–1	1–2	3–3 (8–9 p)
2024	Copa Libertadores	GS	(Venezuela) Deportivo Táchira	2–0	2–0	1st out of 4
2024	Copa Libertadores	GS	(Uruguay) Nacional	2–0	2–2	1st out of 4
2024	Copa Libertadores	GS	(Paraguay) Club Libertad	2–0	2–1	1st out of 4
2024	Copa Libertadores	R16	(Argentina) Talleres	2–1	1–0	3–1
2024	Copa Libertadores	QF	(Chile) Colo-Colo	1–0	1–1	2–1
2024	Copa Libertadores	SF	(Brazil) Atlético Mineiro	0–0	0–3	0–3
2025	Copa Libertadores	GS	(Peru) Universitario	1–1	1–0	1st out of 4
2025	Copa Libertadores	GS	(Ecuador) Barcelona	0–0	3–2	1st out of 4
2025	Copa Libertadores	GS	(Ecuador) Independiente del Valle	6–2	2–2	1st out of 4
2025	Copa Libertadores	R16	(Paraguay) Club Libertad	1–1	0–0	1–1 (3–1 p)
2025	Copa Libertadores	QF	(Brazil) Palmeiras	1–2	1–3	2–5
2025	FIFA Club World Cup	GS	(Japan) Urawa Red Diamonds	3–1		3rd out of 4
2025	FIFA Club World Cup	GS	(Mexico) Monterrey	0–0		3rd out of 4
2025	FIFA Club World Cup	GS	(Italy) Inter Milan	0–2		3rd out of 4
2026	Copa Sudamericana	GS	(Bolivia) Blooming	3–0	1–1	1st out of 4
2026	Copa Sudamericana	GS	(Venezuela) Carabobo	1–0	2–1	1st out of 4
2026	Copa Sudamericana	GS	(Brazil) Red Bull Bragantino	1–1	1–0	1st out of 4
2026	Copa Sudamericana	R16	(Colombia) Independiente Santa Fe	1–1	0–0	1–1 (7–8 p)

== Honours ==
River Plate honours in international competitions
Honour	Titles	Years
Intercontinental Cup	1	1986
Copa Libertadores	4	1986, 1996, 2015, 2018
Copa Sudamericana	1	2014
Recopa Sudamericana	3	2015, 2016, 2019
Supercopa Libertadores	1	1997
Suruga Bank Championship	1	2015
Copa Interamericana	1	1986
Copa Aldao	5	1936, 1937, 1941, 1945, 1947
Tie Cup	1	1914
