= 1998 São Paulo FC season =

São Paulo
1998 season
- Chairman: Fernando Casal de Rey
- Manager: Daryo Pereira (until February 13); Nelsinho Baptista (until September 20); Pita (caretaker, until September 26); Mário Sérgio
- Campeonato Brasileiro: 15th
- Copa do Brasil: Quarterfinals
- Torneio Rio-São Paulo: Runners-up
- Campeonato Paulista: Champions (19th title) (in 1998 Copa do Brasil)
- Copa Mercosur: Group stage
- Top goalscorer: League: Dodô (10); All: Dodô and França (23)

The 1998 season was São Paulo's 69th season since club's existence.

== Statistics ==
=== Scorers ===
Position	Nation	Playing position	Name	Copa do Brasil	Torneio Rio-São Paulo	Campeonato Paulista	Campeonato Brasileiro	Copa Mercosur	Others	Total
1	(Brazil)	FW	Dodô	2	5	3	10	3	0	23
=	(Brazil)	FW	França	1	1	12	7	2	0	23
2	(Brazil)	MF	Fabiano	0	1	6	3	0	0	10
3	(Brazil)	MF	Denílson	0	1	6	0	0	0	7
4	(Brazil)	MF	Carlos Miguel	2	0	2	2	0	0	6
=	(Brazil)	DF	Serginho	0	1	1	4	0	0	6
5	(Brazil)	FW	Adriano	1	3	1	0	0	0	4
=	(Brazil)	MF	Marcelinho Paraíba	1	0	1	2	0	0	4
=	(Brazil)	MF	Raí	2	0	1	0	1	0	4
6	(Brazil)	DF	Edmílson	0	0	1	0	2	0	3
=	(Brazil)	GK	Rogério Ceni	0	0	2	0	0	1	3
7	(Colombia)	FW	Aristizábal	0	0	2	0	0	0	2
=	(Brazil)	MF	Souza	0	0	0	2	0	0	2
8	(Brazil)	MF	Alexandre	1	0	0	0	0	0	1
=	(Brazil)	DF	Belletti	0	0	0	1	0	0	1
=	(Brazil)	DF	Bordon	1	0	0	0	0	0	1
=	(Brazil)	DF	Fábio Aurélio	0	0	0	1	0	0	1
=	(Brazil)	MF	Gallo	1	0	0	0	0	0	1
=	(Brazil)	FW	Marcelo Sergipano	0	0	1	0	0	0	1
=	(Brazil)	DF	Zé Carlos	0	1	0	0	0	0	1
			Own Goals	0	1	1	2	0	0	4
			Total	12	14	40	34	8	1	109

=== Overall ===
Games played	60 (6 Copa do Brasil, 10 Torneio Rio-São Paulo, 14 Campeonato Paulista, 23 Campeonato Brasileiro, 6 Copa Mercosur, 1 Friendly match)
Games won	26 (3 Copa do Brasil, 2 Torneio Rio-São Paulo, 11 Campeonato Paulista, 8 Campeonato Brasileiro, 2 Copa Mercosur, 0 Friendly match)
Games drawn	13 (2 Copa do Brasil, 5 Torneio Rio-São Paulo, 1 Campeonato Paulista, 3 Campeonato Brasileiro, 1 Copa Mercosur, 1 Friendly match)
Games lost	21 (1 Copa do Brasil, 3 Torneio Rio-São Paulo, 2 Campeonato Paulista, 12 Campeonato Brasileiro, 3 Copa Mercosur, 0 Friendly match)
Goals scored	109
Goals conceded	83
Goal difference	+26
Best result	6–1 (H) v São José - Campeonato Paulista - 1998.04.12; 6–1 (H) v América-RN - Campeonato Brasileiro - 1998.08.26
Worst result	2–7 (H) v Portuguesa - Campeonato Brasileiro - 1998.09.20
Most appearances	
Top scorer	Dodô and França (23)

Source: São Paulo FC

== Friendlies ==
January 25 National friendly	São Paulo	1–1	Santos/Flamengo	São Paulo
00:00 (UTC-3)	Rogério Ceni 66'		Ânderson 83'	Stadium: Estádio do Morumbi; Attendance: 22,869; Referee: Alfredo Loebling

== Official competitions ==
=== Copa do Brasil ===
January 20 Round of 32	Sampaio Corrêa	0–0	São Paulo	São Luís
				Stadium: Castelão; Attendance: 4,752; Referee: José M. Tavares

February 6 Round of 32	São Paulo	4–0	Sampaio Corrêa	São Paulo
	Carlos Miguel 27'; Dodô 45'; Marcelinho 85'; Adriano 90'			Stadium: Pacaembu; Attendance: 2,565; Referee: Reinaldo Ribas Vieira

March 19 Round of 16	São Paulo	2–0	Grêmio	São Paulo
	Carlos Miguel 59'; França 73'			Stadium: Morumbi; Referee: Márcio Rezende de Freitas

April 21 Round of 16	Grêmio	0–2	São Paulo	Porto Alegre
			Alexandre 11'; Dodô 20'	Stadium: Olímpico; Attendance: 32,597; Referee: Márcio Rezende de Freitas

May 7 Quarterfinals	São Paulo	1–1	Vasco da Gama	São Paulo
	Gallo 81'		Luizão 69'	Stadium: Morumbi; Attendance: 9,025; Referee: Antônio Pereira da Silva

May 12 Quarterfinals	Vasco da Gama	4–3	São Paulo	Rio de Janeiro
	Luizão 3'; Pedrinho 11'; Donizete 20', 31'		Raí 1', 59'; Bordon 15'	Stadium: São Januário; Attendance: 19,245; Referee: Wilson de Souza Mendonça

==== Record ====
Final Position	Points	Matches	Wins	Draws	Losses	Goals For	Goals Away	Win%
5th	11	6	3	2	1	12	5	61%

=== Torneio Rio-São Paulo ===
January 22 Group stage	Flamengo	2–2	São Paulo	Rio de Janeiro
	Romário 46'; Lúcio 53'		Fabiano 4'; Zé Carlos 12'	Stadium: Maracanã; Attendance: 15,168; Referee: Flávio de Carvalho

January 28 Group stage	São Paulo	2–1	Fluminense	São Paulo
	Adriano 51'; Denílson 70'		Magno Alves 25'	Stadium: Pacaembu; Attendance: 3,172; Referee: Léo Feldman

January 31 Group stage	Santos	1–1	São Paulo	Ribeirão Preto
	Macedo 81'		Serginho 45'	Stadium: Santa Cruz; Attendance: 16,886; Referee: Álvaro Quelhas

February 3 Group stage	São Paulo	1–1	Flamengo	São Paulo
	Adriano 70'		Leonardo Inácio 80'	Stadium: Pacaembu; Attendance: 4,872; Referee: Sérgio Cristiano Nascimento

February 11 Group stage	Fluminense	2–1	São Paulo	Rio de Janeiro
	Flavinho 46'; Rôni 77'		Dodô 31'	Stadium: Maracanã; Attendance: 673; Referee: Edilson Pereira de Carvalho

February 14 Group stage	São Paulo	1–1	Santos	Presidente Prudente
	Dutra 57' (o.g.)		Caíco 32'	Stadium: Prudentão; Attendance: 14,800; Referee: Jorge dos Santos Travassos

February 17 Semifinal	São Paulo	1–2	Palmeiras	São Paulo
	Dodô 44'		Paulo Nunes 19'; Oséas 24'	Stadium: Pacaembu; Attendance: 15,019; Referee: Jorge dos Santos Travessos

February 25 Semifinal	Palmeiras	0–1 (2–3 p)	São Paulo	Campinas
			Dodô 65'	Stadium: Brinco de Ouro; Attendance: 23,411; Referee: Paulo César de Oliveira

February 28 Final	São Paulo	2–3	Botafogo	São Paulo
	Dodô 50'; França 64'		Zé Carlos 38'; Sérgio Manoel 75'; Jorge Luís 86'	Stadium: Morumbi; Attendance: 38,560; Referee: Reinaldo Ribas Vieira

March 4 Final	Botafogo	2–2	São Paulo	Rio de Janeiro
	Jefferson 11'; Zé Carlos 76'		Adriano 37'; Dodô 44'	Stadium: Maracanã; Attendance: 56,334; Referee: Oscar Roberto Godói

==== Record ====
Final Position	Points	Matches	Wins	Draws	Losses	Goals For	Goals Away	Win%
2nd	11	10	2	5	3	14	15	36%

=== Campeonato Paulista ===
March 7 Round 1	Santos	2–3	São Paulo	Santos
	Ronaldo 31'; Müller 62'		Carlos Miguel 8'; Fabiano 49'; Denílson 57'	Stadium: Vila Belmiro; Attendance: 12,667; Referee: Carlos Eugênio Simon

March 10 Round 2	São Paulo	5–0	Rio Branco	São Paulo
	Fabiano 20'; França 27'; Denílson 40'; Adriano 66'; Marcelo Sergipano 70'			Stadium: Estádio Cícero Pompeu de Toledo (Morumbi); Referee: Romildo Corrêa

March 15 Round 3	Matonense	2–0	São Paulo	Matão
	Taílson 5'; Cristiano 26'			Stadium: Hudson Buck Ferreira; Referee: Luciano Augusto Teotônio Almeida

March 17 Round 4	São Paulo	0–0	Portuguesa	São Paulo
				Stadium: Estádio Cícero Pompeu de Toledo (Morumbi); Attendance: 4,825; Referee: Wílson de Souza Mendonça

March 21 Round 5	São José	1–5	São Paulo	São José dos Campos
	Erich 58'		França 17'; Denílson 39', 61'; Fabiano 49'; Serginho 83'	Stadium: Estádio Martins Pereira; Attendance: 11,043; Referee: Alfredo dos Santos Loebling

March 28 Round 6	São Paulo	2–1	Santos	São Paulo
	Rogério Ceni 31'; França 72'		Lúcio 29'	Stadium: Estádio Cícero Pompeu de Toledo (Morumbi); Attendance: 24,115; Referee: Wílson de Souza Mendonça

April 2 Round 7	Rio Branco	1–4	São Paulo	Americana
	Batistinha 88'		Dodô 16'; França 45', 62', 69'	Stadium: Décio Vitta; Attendance: 6,000; Referee: Edílson Pereira de Carvalho

April 5 Round 8	São Paulo	3–1	Matonense	São Paulo
	Denílson 20'; França 76'; Fabiano 90'		Hélcio 89'	Stadium: Estádio Cícero Pompeu de Toledo (Morumbi); Attendance: 11,126; Referee: Flávio de Carvalho

April 7 Round 9	Portuguesa	1–3	São Paulo	São Paulo
	César 28'		Fabiano 39'; Carlos Miguel 68'; França 90'	Stadium: Canindé; Attendance: 14,507; Referee: Alfredo dos Santos Loebling

April 12 Round 10	São Paulo	6–1	São José	São Paulo
	Dodô 7'; Aristizábal 24', 80'; Rogério Ceni 45'; Edmílson 50'; Marcelinho Paraíba 89'		Marco Aurélio 46'	Stadium: Estádio Cícero Pompeu de Toledo (Morumbi); Attendance: 6,000; Referee: Silas Santana

April 19 Semifinal	Palmeiras	1–2	São Paulo	São Paulo
	Roque Júnior 37'		Denílson 58'; Dodô 90'	Stadium: Estádio Cícero Pompeu de Toledo (Morumbi); Attendance: 55,184; Referee: Edílson Pereira de Carvalho

April 26 Semifinal	São Paulo	3–1	Palmeiras	São Paulo
	França 10', 21'; Rogério 24' (o.g.)		Roque Júnior 46'	Stadium: Estádio Cícero Pompeu de Toledo (Morumbi); Attendance: 75,000; Referee: Alfredo dos Santos Loebling

May 3 Final	Corinthians	2–1	São Paulo	São Paulo
	Marcelinho Carioca 24'; Cris 67'		Fabiano 36'	Stadium: Estádio Cícero Pompeu de Toledo (Morumbi); Attendance: 79,972; Referee: David Elleray

May 10 Final	São Paulo	3–1	Corinthians	São Paulo
	Raí 30'; França 56', 82'		Didi 50'	Stadium: Estádio Cícero Pompeu de Toledo (Morumbi); Attendance: 79,710; Referee: Sidrack Marinho dos Santos

==== Record ====
Final Position	Points	Matches	Wins	Draws	Losses	Goals For	Goals Away	Win%
1st	34	14	11	1	2	40	15	80%

=== Campeonato Brasileiro ===
July 26 1	Palmeiras	2–1	São Paulo	São Paulo
	Oséas 68'; Zinho 72'		Júnior 87' (o.g.)	Stadium: Pacaembu; Attendance: 24,996; Referee: Márcio Rezende de Freitas

August 2 2	São Paulo	2–1	Guarani	São Paulo
	Dodô 9'; Souza 78'		Roque 29'	Stadium: Morumbi; Attendance: 7,630; Referee: Valdomiro Mathias Silva Filho

August 5 3	Internacional	0–3	São Paulo	Porto Alegre
			Dodô 9', 62'; França 27'	Stadium: Beira-Rio; Attendance: 7,678; Referee: Jorge dos Santos Travassos

August 9 4	São Paulo	0–2	Cruzeiro	São Paulo
			Fábio Júnior 32', 51'	Stadium: Morumbi; Attendance: 14,098; Referee: Reinaldo Ribas Vieira

August 12 5	Botafogo	3–0	São Paulo	Niterói
	Bruno Quadros 50'; Túlio 66'; França 73'			Stadium: Estádio Caio Martins; Attendance: 1,253; Referee: Luciano Augusto Teotônio Almeida

August 16 6	Sport	1–0	São Paulo	Recife
	Robson 90'			Stadium: Ilha do Retiro; Attendance: 45,151; Referee: Antônio Pereira da Silva

August 23 7	São Paulo	1–3	Santos	São Paulo
	Dodô 49'		Lúcio 58'; Jorginho 69'; Athirson 90'	Stadium: Morumbi; Attendance: 20,988; Referee: Sidrack M. dos Santos

August 26 8	São Paulo	6–1	América-RN	São Paulo
	Fabiano 9', 34'; Dodô 12', 49', 53'; França 59'		Paulo Roberto 30'	Stadium: Morumbi; Attendance: 2,936; Referee: Cláudio Vinícius Cerdeira

August 30 9	Ponte Preta	1–1	São Paulo	Campinas
	Dionísio 36'		Dodô 38'	Stadium: Moisés Lucarelli; Attendance: 13,743; Referee: Jorge dos Santos Travassos

September 6 10	Atlético Mineiro	1–0	São Paulo	Belo Horizonte
	Galván 79'			Stadium: Mineirão; Attendance: 11,539; Referee: Luciano Augusto Teotônio Almeida

September 9 11	Bragantino	1–2	São Paulo	Bragança Paulista
	Geferson 4'		Serginho 28'; França 90'	Stadium: Estádio Marcelo Stéfani; Attendance: 7,612; Referee: Wílson Souza Mendonça

September 12 12	São Paulo	1–1	Vasco da Gama	São Paulo
	Souza 60'		Ramon 90'	Stadium: Morumbi; Attendance: 14,373; Referee: Carlos Eugênio Simon

September 20 13	São Paulo	2–7	Portuguesa	São Paulo
	Serginho 79'; Marcelinho 81'		Emerson 23'; César 27'; Leandro 30'; Carlinhos 32'; Evandro 68'; Ricardo Lopes 70'; Da Silva 90'	Stadium: Pacaembu; Attendance: 7,250; Referee: Antônio Pereira da Silva

September 24 14	América-MG	1–3	São Paulo	Belo Horizonte
	Irênio 71'		Fabiano 53'; Serginho 61'; Marcelinho 90'	Stadium: Estádio Independência; Attendance: 2,441; Referee: Jamir Carlos Garcez

September 26 15	São Paulo	0–0	Flamengo	São Paulo
				Stadium: Morumbi; Attendance: 12,796; Referee: Carlos Eugênio Simon

October 3 16	Vitória	1–0	São Paulo	Salvador
	Hernández 30'			Stadium: Barradão; Attendance: 20,892; Referee: Reinaldo Ribas Vieira

October 8 17	São Paulo	3–0	Paraná	São Paulo
	Carlos Miguel 7'; Dodô 13'; Fábio Aurélio 55'			Stadium: Morumbi; Attendance: 1,942; Referee: Carlos Eugênio Simon

October 11 18	São Paulo	3–1	Goiás	São Paulo
	Carlos Miguel 21'; Belletti 36'; Serginho 69'		Dill 65'	Stadium: Morumbi; Attendance: 6,212; Referee: Evandro Rogério Roman

October 18 19	Coritiba	2–1	São Paulo	Curitiba
	Sandroval 33'; Struway 57'		França 15'	Stadium: Couto Pereira; Attendance: 26,848; Referee: Sidrack M. dos Santos

October 21 20	São Paulo	1–2	Grêmio	São Paulo
	Rodrigo Costa 28' (o.g.)		Scheidt 6'; Rodrigo Mendes 59'	Stadium: Morumbi; Attendance: 2,508; Referee: Luciano Augusto Teotônio Almeida

October 24 21	São Paulo	1–2	Corinthians	São Paulo
	França 72'		Didi 21'; Edílson 86'	Stadium: Morumbi; Attendance: 21,200; Referee: Reinaldo Ribas Vieira

November 4 22	Juventude	2–1	São Paulo	Caxias do Sul
	Luís Antônio 12'; Marcão 53'		França 35'	Stadium: Alfredo Jaconi; Attendance: 4,298; Referee: Sidrack M. dos Santos

November 12 23	São Paulo	2–0	Atlético Paranaense	São Paulo
	Dodô 53'; França 76'			Stadium: Morumbi; Attendance: 1,224; Referee: Cláudio Vinícius Cerdeira

==== Record ====
Final Position	Points	Matches	Wins	Draws	Losses	Goals For	Goals Away	Win%
15th	27	23	8	3	12	34	35	39%

=== Copa Mercosur ===
July 30 Group A	São Paulo (Brazil)	1–0	(Chile) Colo-Colo	São Paulo
	Raí 79'			Stadium: Estádio do Morumbi; Attendance: 2,547; Referee: Horacio Elizondo

August 20 Group A	Cruzeiro (Brazil)	5–1	(Brazil) São Paulo	Belo Horizonte
	Gilberto 36'; Müller 43'; Fábio Júnior 75', 78'; Marcelo Ramos 90'		Edmílson 21'	Stadium: Estádio do Mineirão; Attendance: 4,383; Referee: Sidrack Marinhos dos Santos

September 3 Group A	São Paulo (Brazil)	2–1	(Argentina) San Lorenzo	São Paulo
	Dodô 48', 64'		Biaggio 5'	Stadium: Estádio do Morumbi; Attendance: 2,109; Referee: Robert Troxler

September 17 Group A	Colo-Colo (Chile)	2–1	(Brazil) São Paulo	Santiago
	Tapia 28'; Reyes 70'		França 20'	Stadium: Estadio Monumental David Arellano; Referee: Daniel Gimenez

September 30 Group A	São Paulo (Brazil)	1–1	(Brazil) Cruzeiro	São Paulo
	Dodô 51'		Gustavo 61'	Stadium: Estádio do Morumbi; Attendance: 1,677; Referee: Wilson de Souza Mendonça

October 15 Group A	San Lorenzo (Argentina)	3–2	(Brazil) São Paulo	Buenos Aires
	Gorosito 31'; Acosta 35', 50'		Edmílson 15'; França 26'	Stadium: El Nuevo Gasómetro; Attendance: 15,000; Referee: Gustavo Gallesio

==== Record ====
Final Position	Points	Matches	Wins	Draws	Losses	Goals For	Goals Away	Win%
13th	7	6	2	1	3	8	12	38%
