= São Paulo FC in international football =

Following is the retrospect of all São Paulo FC seasons in the international football official competitions.

== CONMEBOL competitions ==
Season	Competition	Round	Opposition	Home	Away	Neutral
1972	Copa Libertadores	First round (Group 3)	(Brazil) Atlético Mineiro	0–0	2–2	
1972	Copa Libertadores	First round (Group 3)	(Paraguay) Olimpia	3–1	1–0	
1972	Copa Libertadores	First round (Group 3)	(Paraguay) Cerro Porteño	4–0	2–3	
1972	Copa Libertadores	Second round (Group B)	(Ecuador) Barcelona	1–1	0–0	
1972	Copa Libertadores	Second round (Group B)	(Argentina) Independiente	1–0	0–2	
1974	Copa Libertadores	First round (Group 2)	(Brazil) Palmeiras	2–0	2–1	
1974	Copa Libertadores	First round (Group 2)	(Bolivia) Jorge Wilstermann	5–0	1–0	
1974	Copa Libertadores	First round (Group 2)	(Bolivia) Deportivo Municipal	3–3	1–1	
1974	Copa Libertadores	Second round (Group B)	(Colombia) Millonarios	4–0	0–0	
1974	Copa Libertadores	Second round (Group B)	(Peru) Defensor Lima	4–0	1–0	
1974	Copa Libertadores	Finals	(Argentina) Independiente	2–1	0–2	0–1
1978	Copa Libertadores	First round (Group 3)	(Brazil) Atlético Mineiro	1–1	1–2	
1978	Copa Libertadores	First round (Group 3)	(Chile) Palestino	1–2	1–0	
1978	Copa Libertadores	First round (Group 3)	(Chile) Unión Española	1–1	1–1	
1982	Copa Libertadores	First round (Group 2)	(Brazil) Grêmio	2–2	0–0	
1982	Copa Libertadores	First round (Group 2)	(Uruguay) Defensor Sporting	2–1	3–1	
1982	Copa Libertadores	First round (Group 2)	(Uruguay) Peñarol	0–1	0–1	
1987	Copa Libertadores	First round (Group 3)	(Brazil) Guarani	2–2	1–3	
1987	Copa Libertadores	First round (Group 3)	(Chile) Cobreloa	2–1	1–3	
1987	Copa Libertadores	First round (Group 3)	(Chile) Colo-Colo	1–2	2–2	
1992	Copa Libertadores	Group stage (Group 2)	(Brazil) Criciúma	4–0	0–3	
1992	Copa Libertadores	Group stage (Group 2)	(Bolivia) San José	1–1	3–0	
1992	Copa Libertadores	Group stage (Group 2)	(Bolivia) Bolívar	2–0	1–1	
1992	Copa Libertadores	Round of 16	(Uruguay) Nacional	2–0	1–0	
1992	Copa Libertadores	Quarterfinals	(Brazil) Criciúma	1–0	1–1	
1992	Copa Libertadores	Semifinals	(Ecuador) Barcelona	3–0	0–2	
1992	Copa Libertadores	Finals	(Argentina) Newell's Old Boys	1–0 (3–2 p)	0–1	
1992	Supercopa Libertadores	First round	(Brazil) Santos	4–1	1–1	
1992	Supercopa Libertadores	Quarterfinals	(Paraguay) Olimpia	1–2	0–1	
1993	Copa Libertadores	Round of 16	(Argentina) Newell's Old Boys	4–0	0–2	
1993	Copa Libertadores	Quarterfinals	(Brazil) Flamengo	2–0	1–1	
1993	Copa Libertadores	Semifinals	(Paraguay) Cerro Porteño	1–0	0–0	
1993	Copa Libertadores	Finals	(Chile) Universidad Católica	5–1	0–2	
1993	Copa de Oro	Semifinals	(Argentina) Boca Juniors	1–1 (a.e.t.)	0–1	
1993	Recopa Sudamericana	—N/a	(Brazil) Cruzeiro	0–0	0–0 (4–2 p)	
1993	Supercopa Libertadores	First round	(Argentina) Independiente	2–0	1–1	
1993	Supercopa Libertadores	Quarterfinals	(Brazil) Grêmio	2–2	1–0	
1993	Supercopa Libertadores	Semifinals	(Colombia) Atlético Nacional	1–0	1–2 (5–4 p)	
1993	Supercopa Libertadores	Finals	(Brazil) Flamengo	2–2	2–2 (5–3 p)	
1994	Recopa Sudamericana	—N/a	(Brazil) Botafogo	—N/a	—N/a	3–1
1994	Copa Libertadores	Round of 16	(Brazil) Palmeiras	2–1	0–0	
1994	Copa Libertadores	Quarterfinals	(Chile) Unión Española	4–3	1–1	
1994	Copa Libertadores	Semifinals	(Paraguay) Olimpia	2–1	0–1 (4–3 p)	
1994	Copa Libertadores	Finals	(Argentina) Vélez Sarsfield	1–0 (3–5 p)	0–1	
1994	Supercopa Libertadores	Round of 16	(Colombia) Atlético Nacional	2–0	1–1	
1994	Supercopa Libertadores	Quarterfinals	(Chile) Colo-Colo	4–1	1–2	
1994	Supercopa Libertadores	Semifinals	(Argentina) Boca Juniors	1–0	0–2	
1994	Copa CONMEBOL	Round of 16	(Brazil) Grêmio	0–0 (6–5 p)	0–0	
1994	Copa CONMEBOL	Quarterfinals	(Peru) Sporting Cristal	3–1	0–0	
1994	Copa CONMEBOL	Semifinals	(Brazil) Corinthians	2–3 (5–4 p)	4–3	
1994	Copa CONMEBOL	Finals	(Uruguay) Peñarol	6–1	0–3	
1995	Supercopa Libertadores	Preliminary round	(Argentina) Boca Juniors	1–0	3–2	
1995	Supercopa Libertadores	Preliminary round	(Paraguay) Olimpia	0–3	2–1	
1995	Supercopa Libertadores / Copa de Oro	Quarterfinals / Finals	(Brazil) Cruzeiro	0–1 (2–4 p)	1–0	
1996	Copa Masters CONMEBOL	Semifinal	(Brazil) Botafogo	—N/a	—N/a	7–3
1996	Copa Masters CONMEBOL	Final	(Brazil) Atlético Mineiro	—N/a	—N/a	3–0
1996	Copa de Oro	Semifinal	(Brazil) Grêmio	—N/a	—N/a	2–1
1996	Copa de Oro	Final	(Brazil) Flamengo	—N/a	—N/a	1–3
1996	Supercopa Libertadores	Preliminary round	(Paraguay) Olimpia	2–1 (3–5 p)	1–2	
1997	Supercopa Libertadores	Group stage (Group 2)	(Brazil) Flamengo	1–0	2–3	
1997	Supercopa Libertadores	Group stage (Group 2)	(Argentina) Vélez Sarsfield	5–1	3–3	
1997	Supercopa Libertadores	Group stage (Group 2)	(Paraguay) Olimpia	4–1	0–0	
1997	Supercopa Libertadores	Semifinals	(Chile) Colo-Colo	3–1	1–0	
1997	Supercopa Libertadores	Finals	(Argentina) River Plate	0–0	1–2	
1998	Copa Mercosur	Group stage (Group A)	(Chile) Colo-Colo	1–0	1–2	
1998	Copa Mercosur	Group stage (Group A)	(Brazil) Cruzeiro	1–1	1–5	
1998	Copa Mercosur	Group stage (Group A)	(Argentina) San Lorenzo	2–1	2–3	
1999	Copa Mercosur	Group stage (Group C)	(Argentina) Boca Juniors	1–1	1–5	
1999	Copa Mercosur	Group stage (Group C)	(Argentina) San Lorenzo	4–1	0–1	
1999	Copa Mercosur	Group stage (Group C)	(Chile) Universidad Católica	2–0	3–0	
2000	Copa Mercosur	Group stage (Group C)	(Chile) Colo-Colo	4–0	1–3	
2000	Copa Mercosur	Group stage (Group C)	(Argentina) Rosario Central	1–0	1–2	
2000	Copa Mercosur	Group stage (Group C)	(Paraguay) Cerro Porteño	4–4	2–4	
2001	Copa Mercosur	Group stage (Group D)	(Uruguay) Peñarol	3–0	1–1	
2001	Copa Mercosur	Group stage (Group D)	(Argentina) Talleres	0–0	0–0	
2001	Copa Mercosur	Group stage (Group D)	(Argentina) Vélez Sarsfield	1–1	2–4	
2003	Copa Sudamericana	First round	(Brazil) Grêmio	—N/a	4–0	
2003	Copa Sudamericana	First round	(Brazil) Vasco da Gama	2–1	—N/a	
2003	Copa Sudamericana	Second round	(Brazil) Fluminense	1–0	1–1	
2003	Copa Sudamericana	Quarterfinals	(Bolivia) The Strongest	4–1	3–1	
2003	Copa Sudamericana	Semifinals	(Argentina) River Plate	3–1 (2–4 p)	0–2	
2004	Copa Libertadores	Group stage (Group 4)	(Peru) Alianza Lima	3–1	2–1	
2004	Copa Libertadores	Group stage (Group 4)	(Chile) Cobreloa	3–1	2–1	
2004	Copa Libertadores	Group stage (Group 4)	(Ecuador) LDU Quito	1–0	0–3	
2004	Copa Libertadores	Round of 16	(Argentina) Rosario Central	2–1 (5–4 p)	0–1	
2004	Copa Libertadores	Quarterfinals	(Venezuela) Deportivo Táchira	3–0	4–1	
2004	Copa Libertadores	Semifinals	(Colombia) Once Caldas	0–0	1–2	
2004	Copa Sudamericana	First round	(Brazil) São Caetano	1–1 (4–1 p)	1–1	
2004	Copa Sudamericana	Second round	(Brazil) Santos	1–1	0–1	
2005	Copa Libertadores	Group stage (Group 3)	(Bolivia) The Strongest	3–3	3–0	
2005	Copa Libertadores	Group stage (Group 3)	Universidad de Chile	4–2	1–1	
2005	Copa Libertadores	Group stage (Group 3)	(Argentina) Quilmes	3–1	2–2	
2005	Copa Libertadores	Round of 16	(Brazil) Palmeiras	2–0	1–0	
2005	Copa Libertadores	Quarterfinals	(Mexico) Tigres UANL	4–0	1–2	
2005	Copa Libertadores	Semifinals	(Argentina) River Plate	2–0	3–2	
2005	Copa Libertadores	Finals	(Brazil) Atlético Paranaense	4–0	1–1	
2005	Copa Sudamericana	First round	(Brazil) Internacional	1–1	1–2	
2006	Copa Libertadores	Group stage (Group 1)	(Venezuela) Caracas	2–0	2–1	
2006	Copa Libertadores	Group stage (Group 1)	(Peru) Cienciano	4–1	2–0	
2006	Copa Libertadores	Group stage (Group 1)	(Mexico) Guadalajara	1–2	1–2	
2006	Copa Libertadores	Round of 16	(Brazil) Palmeiras	2–1	1–1	
2006	Copa Libertadores	Quarterfinals	(Argentina) Estudiantes	1–0 (4–3 p)	0–1	
2006	Copa Libertadores	Semifinals	(Mexico) Guadalajara	3–0	1–0	
2006	Copa Libertadores	Finals	(Brazil) Internacional	1–2	2–2	
2006	Recopa Sudamericana	—N/a	(Argentina) Boca Juniors	2–2	1–2	
2007	Copa Libertadores	Group stage (Group 2)	(Chile) Audax Italiano	2–2	0–0	
2007	Copa Libertadores	Group stage (Group 2)	(Peru) Alianza Lima	4–0	1–0	
2007	Copa Libertadores	Group stage (Group 2)	(Mexico) Necaxa	3–0	1–2	
2007	Copa Libertadores	Round of 16	(Brazil) Grêmio	1–1	0–2	
2007	Copa Sudamericana	First round	(Brazil) Figueirense	1–1	2–2 (a)	
2007	Copa Sudamericana	Round of 16	(Argentina) Boca Juniors	1–0	1–2 (a)	
2007	Copa Sudamericana	Quarterfinals	(Colombia) Millonarios	0–1	0–2	
2008	Copa Libertadores	Group stage (Group 7)	(Colombia) Atlético Nacional	1–0	1–1	
2008	Copa Libertadores	Group stage (Group 7)	(Chile) Audax Italiano	2–1	0–1	
2008	Copa Libertadores	Group stage (Group 7)	(Paraguay) Sportivo Luqueño	1–0	1–1	
2008	Copa Libertadores	Round of 16	(Uruguay) Nacional	2–0	0–0	
2008	Copa Libertadores	Quarterfinals	(Brazil) Fluminense	1–0	1–3	
2008	Copa Sudamericana	First round	(Brazil) Atlético Paranaense	0–0 (3–4 p)	0–0	
2009	Copa Libertadores	Group stage (Group 4)	(Colombia) Independiente Medellín	1–1	1–2	
2009	Copa Libertadores	Group stage (Group 4)	(Colombia) América de Cali	2–1	3–1	
2009	Copa Libertadores	Group stage (Group 4)	(Uruguay) Defensor Sporting	2–1	1–0	
2009	Copa Libertadores	Round of 16	(Mexico) Guadalajara	w/o		
2009	Copa Libertadores	Quarterfinals	(Brazil) Cruzeiro	0–2	1–2	
2010	Copa Libertadores	Group stage (Group 2)	(Mexico) Monterrey	2–0	0–0	
2010	Copa Libertadores	Group stage (Group 2)	(Colombia) Once Caldas	1–0	1–2	
2010	Copa Libertadores	Group stage (Group 2)	(Paraguay) Nacional	3–0	2–0	
2010	Copa Libertadores	Round of 16	(Peru) Universitario	0–0 (3–1 p)	0–0	
2010	Copa Libertadores	Quarterfinals	(Brazil) Cruzeiro	2–0	2–0	
2010	Copa Libertadores	Semifinals	(Brazil) Internacional	2–1 (a)	0–1	
2011	Copa Sudamericana	Second round	(Brazil) Ceará	3–0	1–2	
2011	Copa Sudamericana	Round of 16	(Paraguay) Libertad	1–0	0–2	
2012	Copa Sudamericana	Second round	(Brazil) Bahia	2–0	2–0	
2012	Copa Sudamericana	Round of 16	(Ecuador) LDU Loja	0–0	1–1 (a)	
2012	Copa Sudamericana	Quarterfinals	Universidad de Chile	5–0	2–0	
2012	Copa Sudamericana	Semifinals	(Chile) Universidad Católica	0–0	1–1 (a)	
2012	Copa Sudamericana	Finals	(Argentina) Tigre	2–0	0–0	
2013	Copa Libertadores	First stage	(Bolivia) Bolívar	5–0	3–4	
2013	Copa Libertadores	Group stage (Group 3)	(Brazil) Atlético Mineiro	2–0	1–2	
2013	Copa Libertadores	Group stage (Group 3)	(Bolivia) The Strongest	2–1	1–2	
2013	Copa Libertadores	Group stage (Group 3)	(Argentina) Arsenal	1–1	1–2	
2013	Copa Libertadores	Round of 16	(Brazil) Atlético Mineiro	1–2	1–4	
2013	Recopa Sudamericana	—N/a	(Brazil) Corinthians	1–2	0–2	
2013	Copa Sudamericana	Round of 16	(Chile) Universidad Católica	1–1	4–3	
2013	Copa Sudamericana	Quarterfinals	(Colombia) Atlético Nacional	3–2	0–0	
2013	Copa Sudamericana	Semifinals	(Brazil) Ponte Preta	1–3	1–1	
2014	Copa Sudamericana	Second round	(Brazil) Criciúma	2–0	1–2	
2014	Copa Sudamericana	Round of 16	(Chile) Huachipato	1–0	3–2	
2014	Copa Sudamericana	Quarterfinals	(Ecuador) Emelec	4–2	2–3	
2014	Copa Sudamericana	Semifinals	(Colombia) Atlético Nacional	1–0 (1–4 p)	0–1	
2015	Copa Libertadores	Group stage (Group 2)	(Brazil) Corinthians	2–0	0–2	
2015	Copa Libertadores	Group stage (Group 2)	(Uruguay) Danubio	4–0	2–1	
2015	Copa Libertadores	Group stage (Group 2)	(Argentina) San Lorenzo	1–0	0–1	
2015	Copa Libertadores	Round of 16	(Brazil) Cruzeiro	1–0	0–1 (3–4 p)	
2016	Copa Libertadores	First stage	(Peru) Universidad César Vallejo	1–0	1–1	
2016	Copa Libertadores	Group stage (Group 1)	(Bolivia) The Strongest	0–1	1–1	
2016	Copa Libertadores	Group stage (Group 1)	(Argentina) River Plate	2–1	1–1	
2016	Copa Libertadores	Group stage (Group 1)	(Venezuela) Trujillanos	6–0	1–1	
2016	Copa Libertadores	Round of 16	(Mexico) Toluca	4–0	1–3	
2016	Copa Libertadores	Quarterfinals	(Brazil) Atlético Mineiro	1–0	1–2 (a)	
2016	Copa Libertadores	Semifinals	(Colombia) Atlético Nacional	0–2	1–2	
2017	Copa Sudamericana	First round	(Argentina) Defensa y Justicia	1–1 (a)	0–0	
2018	Copa Sudamericana	First round	(Argentina) Rosario Central	1–0	0–0	
2018	Copa Sudamericana	Second round	(Argentina) Colón	0–1	1–0 (3–5 p)	
2019	Copa Libertadores	First stage	(Argentina) Talleres	0–0	0–2	
2020	Copa Libertadores	Group stage (Group D)	(Peru) Binacional	5–1	1–2	
2020	Copa Libertadores	Group stage (Group D)	(Ecuador) LDU Quito	3–0	2–4	
2020	Copa Libertadores	Group stage (Group D)	(Argentina) River Plate	1–1	1–2	
2020	Copa Sudamericana	Second round	(Argentina) Lanús	4–3 (a)	2–3	
2021	Copa Libertadores	Group stage (Group E)	(Peru) Sporting Cristal	3–0	3–0	
2021	Copa Libertadores	Group stage (Group E)	(Uruguay) Rentistas	2–0	1–1	
2021	Copa Libertadores	Group stage (Group E)	(Argentina) Racing	0–1	0–0	
2021	Copa Libertadores	Round of 16	(Argentina) Racing	1–1	3–1	
2021	Copa Libertadores	Quarterfinals	(Brazil) Palmeiras	1–1	0–3	
2022	Copa Sudamericana	Group stage (Group D)	(Peru) Ayacucho	1–0	3–2	
2022	Copa Sudamericana	Group stage (Group D)	(Chile) Everton	2–0	0–0	
2022	Copa Sudamericana	Group stage (Group D)	(Bolivia) Jorge Wilstermann	3–0	3–1	
2022	Copa Sudamericana	Round of 16	(Chile) Universidad Católica	4–1	4–2	
2022	Copa Sudamericana	Quarterfinals	(Brazil) Ceará	1–0	1–2 (4–3 p)	
2022	Copa Sudamericana	Semifinals	(Brazil) Atlético Goianiense	2–0 (4–2 p)	1–3	
2022	Copa Sudamericana	Final	(Ecuador) Independiente del Valle	—N/a	—N/a	0–2
2023	Copa Sudamericana	Group stage (Group D)	(Argentina) Tigre	2–0	2–0	
2023	Copa Sudamericana	Group stage (Group D)	(Venezuela) Academia Puerto Cabello	2–0	2–0	
2023	Copa Sudamericana	Group stage (Group D)	(Colombia) Deportes Tolima	5–0	0–0	
2023	Copa Sudamericana	Round of 16	(Argentina) San Lorenzo	2–0	0–1	
2023	Copa Sudamericana	Quarterfinals	(Ecuador) LDU Quito	1–0 (4–5 p)	1–2	
2024	Copa Libertadores	Group stage (Group B)	(Argentina) Talleres	2–0	1–2	
2024	Copa Libertadores	Group stage (Group B)	(Chile) Cobresal	2–0	3–1	
2024	Copa Libertadores	Group stage (Group B)	(Ecuador) Barcelona	0–0	2–0	
2024	Copa Libertadores	Round of 16	(Uruguay) Nacional	2–0	0–0	
2024	Copa Libertadores	Quarterfinals	(Brazil) Botafogo	1–1 (4–5 p)	0–0	
2025	Copa Libertadores	Group stage (Group D)	(Argentina) Talleres	2–1	1–0	
2025	Copa Libertadores	Group stage (Group D)	(Peru) Alianza Lima	2–2	2–0	
2025	Copa Libertadores	Group stage (Group D)	(Paraguay) Libertad	1–1	2–0	
2025	Copa Libertadores	Round of 16	(Colombia) Atlético Nacional	1–1 (4–3 p)	0–0	
2025	Copa Libertadores	Quarterfinals	(Ecuador) LDU Quito	0–1	0–2	
2026	Copa Sudamericana	Group stage (Group C)	(Uruguay) Boston River	2–0	1–0	
2026	Copa Sudamericana	Group stage (Group C)	(Chile) O'Higgins	2–0	0–0	
2026	Copa Sudamericana	Group stage (Group C)	(Colombia) Millonarios	1–1	0–0	
2026	Copa Sudamericana	Round of 16	(Bolivia) Bolívar	3–1	1–1	
2026	Copa Sudamericana	Quarterfinals	(Argentina) Boca Juniors	1–1	0–1	

== World championships ==
Season	Competition	Round	Opposition	Match
1992	Intercontinental Cup	—N/a	(Spain) Barcelona	2–1
1993	Intercontinental Cup	—N/a	(Italy) Milan	3–2
2005	FIFA Club World Cup	Semifinals	(Saudi Arabia) Al-Ittihad	3–2
2005	FIFA Club World Cup	Final	(England) Liverpool	1–0

== Other official competitions ==
Season	Competition	Round	Opposition	Match
2013	Suruga Bank Championship	—N/a	(Japan) Kashima Antlers	2–3

== Overall ==
As of 2025 season

Competition	M	W	D	L	GF	GA	GD	Win%
Copa Libertadores	219	105	56	58	331	204	+127	47.95
Copa Sudamericana	81	40	22	19	123	72	+51	49.38
Supercopa Libertadores	36	17	9	10	57	41	+16	47.22
Copa Mercosur	24	8	7	9	39	39	+0	33.33
Copa CONMEBOL	8	3	3	2	15	11	+4	37.50
Recopa Sudamericana	7	1	3	3	7	9	−2	14.29
Copa de Oro	6	2	1	3	5	7	−2	33.33
Copa Masters CONMEBOL	2	2	0	0	10	3	+7	100.00
Intercontinental Cup	2	2	0	0	5	3	+2	100.00
FIFA Club World Cup	2	2	0	0	4	2	+2	100.00
Suruga Bank Championship	1	0	0	1	2	3	−1	0.00
Total	388	182	101	105	598	394	+204	46.91

== Notes ==
1. Match also valid for the 1993 Campeonato Brasileiro Série A.
2. Due to scheduling conflicts, the matches are valid for both competitions.
3. Guadalajara withdrew from the tournament due to H1N1 flu outbreak in Mexico.
4. Tigre abandoned the match after the first half.
