= Leonel Gancedo =

Argentine footballer (born 1971)

Pipa Gancedo
Personal information
- Full name: Leonel Fernando Gancedo
- Date of birth: 23 January 1971 (age 55)
- Place of birth: Buenos Aires, Argentina
- Height: 1.80 m (5 ft 11 in)
- Position: Midfielder

Team information
- Current team: UD Lanzarote (Manager)

Senior career*
| Years | Team | Apps | (Gls) |
| 1991–1996 | Argentinos Juniors | 145 | (19) |
| 1996–2000 | River Plate | 112 | (6) |
| 2000–2003 | Osasuna | 81 | (5) |
| 2003–2004 | Real Murcia | 17 | (0) |
| 2004–2005 | Huracán | 15 | (1) |
| 2006 | América de Cali | 5 | (1) |
| 2007 | River Plate PR | 7 | (3) |
| 2007–2008 | Deportivo Morón | 30 | (18) |
| 2012–2013 | Independiente de Monte | 3 | (0) |
| 2018– | FC Encamp | | |
| Total | | 415 | (53) |

Managerial career
- 2018–: FC Encamp
- * Club domestic league appearances and goals

Leonel Fernando "Pipa" Gancedo (born 23 January 1971) is an Argentine former professional footballer who is currently player-manager of Andorran club FC Encamp.

Gancedo, a midfielder, played for River Plate for four years, winning five domestic titles, as well as the 1996 Copa Libertadores and the 1997 Supercopa Libertadores with the club. He later served as the club's sporting director.

He joined FC Encamp, aged 47, in September 2018. On May 31, 2023, the Argentinian was announced as the new Manager of UD Lanzarote

== Honours ==
River Plate

- Primera División Argentina (5): 1996, 1997, 1999 (Apertura); 1997, 2000 (Clausura)
- Copa Libertadores (1): 1996
- Supercopa Libertadores (1): 1997
