= Martín Fúriga =

Argentine footballer

Personal information
- Full name: Martín Alejandro Fúriga Sande
- Date of birth: 22 January 1976 (age 50)
- Place of birth: La Plata, Argentina
- Height: 1.85 m (6 ft 1 in)
- Position: Striker

Senior career*
Years	Team	Apps	(Gls)
1995–1999	Estudiantes LP	83	(18)
1999–2000	Ancona		
2000	Estudiantes LP	1	(0)
2001	Sport Boys		
2001–2002	Levante	23	(2)
2002–2003	Amurrio	25	(11)
2003–2005	Recreación	62	(13)
2005–2007	Logroñés	28	(2)
2008–2009	Calahorra		
2009–2011	Varea		
- * Club domestic league appearances and goals

Martín Alejandro Fúriga Sande (born 22 January 1976) is an Argentine retired footballer who played as a striker.
