= Fábio Mello (footballer) =

Brazilian footballer

Personal information
- Full name: Fábio Jerônimo Mello
- Date of birth: 17 November 1975 (age 50)
- Place of birth: São Paulo, Brazil
- Position: Attacking midfielder

Youth career
- 1986–1994: São Paulo

Senior career*
Years	Team	Apps	(Gls)
1994–1999	São Paulo	38	(4)
1997	→ Atlético Paranaense (loan)		
1998	→ Juventude (loan)		
2000	Inter de Limeira		
2000	Náutico		
2000	Atlético Mineiro	8	(0)
2001–2002	Fluminense	11	(2)
2002	Brasiliense		
2002–2003	União da Madeira		
2004	Paulista		
2005	Figueirense		
- * Club domestic league appearances and goals as of 17 July 2024

Fábio Mello (born 17 November 1975) is a Brazilian former professional footballer who played as an attacking midfielder. Currently works as a football agent.

== Playing career ==
Fábio Mello started in the children's categories at São Paulo FC in 1994, and remained in the club's youth sectors until 1994. He played professionally for the club until 1999, making 38 appearances. He played for other major Brazilian football teams, notably Atlético Mineiro and Fluminense, where he was state champion in 2002.

== Post career ==
After retiring, he became a football agent for several Brazilian football players, such as Mayke and Rafael, being one of the most successful in the field, having his company valued at € 36 million.

== Honours ==
Fluminense

- Campeonato Carioca: 2002
