= Dodo (nickname) =

Dodo or DoDo is a nickname for:

== Footballers ==
- Dodô (footballer, born 1974), Brazilian retired footballer Ricardo Lucas Figueredo Monte Raso
- Dodô (footballer, born June 1987), Brazilian footballer Sandro Ferreira André Nascimento
- Dodô (footballer, born October 1987), Brazilian footballer Luiz Paulo Hilário
- Dodô (footballer, born 1992), Brazilian footballer José Rodolfo Pires Ribeiro
- Dodô (footballer, born 1994), Brazilian footballer Raphael Guimarães de Paula
- Dodô (footballer, born 1998), Brazilian footballer Domilson Cordeiro dos Santos
- Dodô (footballer, born 2000), Brazilian footballer Paulo Henrique Athanazio
- Dodô (footballer, born 2001), Brazilian footballer Vinicius Rodrigues Adelino dos Santos
- Youssef Mohamad (born 1980), also known as Dodo, Lebanese footballer

== Actors and directors ==
- Dodo Abashidze (1924–1990), Soviet Georgian film actor and director
- Dorit Bar Or (a.k.a. Dodo Bar Or, Israeli actress and fashion designer
- Nora Denney (1927–2005), American actress
- Dodo Watts (1910–1990), British film actress

== Others ==
- Frank Bird (baseball) (1869–1958), American Major League Baseball catcher briefly in 1892
- Lewis Carroll (1832–1898), English writer
- Carol Cheng (born 1957), Hong Kong artist
- Doris Große (1884–?), German artists' model
- Doreen Kartinyeri (1935–2007), Aboriginal Australian activist and genealogist
- Dodo Lees (1920–1991), British journalist and Second World War nurse
- Dodo Marmarosa (1925–2002), American jazz pianist
