= 1997 Supercopa Libertadores =

1997 Supercopa Libertadores 1997 Supercopa Sudamericana João Havelange

Tournament details
- Dates: 15 June – 17 December
- Teams: 17 (from 6 confederations)

Final positions
- Champions: (Argentina) River Plate (1st title)
- Runners-up: (Brazil) São Paulo

Tournament statistics
- Matches played: 60
- Goals scored: 187 (3.12 per match)
- Top scorer(s): (Chile) Ivo Basay (8 goals)

The 1997 Supercopa Libertadores was the tenth and final season of the Supercopa Libertadores, a club football tournament for past Copa Libertadores winners.

Vasco da Gama were admitted to the tournament for the first time in recognition of winning the South American Championship of Champions in 1948. Argentinos Juniors did not take part. River Plate won the competition for the first time, defeating São Paulo 2–1 on aggregate in the final.

For its final season, the format of the first round was changed from a two-legged knockout round to four groups of four teams playing each other twice. As 17 teams were scheduled to take part, a preliminary round was played to eliminate one team.

As through the successive editions of this cup were added new champions from the Copa Libertadores, in 1997 the Conmebol decided that the last teams of each group would descend to reduce the number of teams to disputed it. That year descended Velez Sarsfield, Racing Club and Boca Juniors (all teams from Argentina) and Gremio (Brazil).

== Teams ==
| Association | Team (Berth) | Entry stage | Qualification method |
|---|---|---|---|
| (Argentina) Argentina; 6 berths | Independiente (Argentina 1) | Group stage | 1964, 1965, 1972, 1973, 1974, 1975, 1984 Copa Libertadores champions |
| (Argentina) Argentina; 6 berths | Estudiantes (Argentina 2) | Group stage | 1968, 1969, 1970 Copa Libertadores champions |
| (Argentina) Argentina; 6 berths | River Plate (Argentina 3) | Group stage | 1986, 1996 Copa Libertadores champions |
| (Argentina) Argentina; 6 berths | Boca Juniors (Argentina 4) | Group stage | 1977, 1978 Copa Libertadores champions |
| (Argentina) Argentina; 6 berths | Vélez Sarsfield (Argentina 5) | Group stage | 1994 Copa Libertadores champions |
| (Argentina) Argentina; 6 berths | Racing (Argentina 6) | Group stage | 1967 Copa Libertadores champions |
| (Brazil) Brazil; 6 berths | Grêmio (Brazil 1) | Group stage | 1983, 1995 Copa Libertadores champions |
| (Brazil) Brazil; 6 berths | São Paulo (Brazil 2) | Group stage | 1992, 1993 Copa Libertadores champions |
| (Brazil) Brazil; 6 berths | Santos (Brazil 3) | Group stage | 1962, 1963 Copa Libertadores champions |
| (Brazil) Brazil; 6 berths | Flamengo (Brazil 4) | Group stage | 1981 Copa Libertadores champions |
| (Brazil) Brazil; 6 berths | Cruzeiro (Brazil 5) | Group stage | 1976 Copa Libertadores champions |
| (Brazil) Brazil; 6 berths | Vasco da Gama (Brazil 6) | Preliminary round | 1948 Campeonato de Campeones Sudamericano champions |
| (Chile) Chile; 1 berth | Colo-Colo (Chile 1) | Group stage | 1991 Copa Libertadores champions |
| (Colombia) Colombia; 1 berth | Atlético Nacional (Colombia 1) | Group stage | 1989 Copa Libertadores champions |
| (Paraguay) Paraguay; 1 berth | Olimpia (Paraguay 1) | Group stage | 1979, 1990 Copa Libertadores champions |
| (Uruguay) Uruguay; 2 berths | Peñarol (Uruguay 1) | Preliminary round | 1960, 1961, 1966, 1982, 1987 Copa Libertadores champions |
| (Uruguay) Uruguay; 2 berths | Nacional (Uruguay 2) | Preliminary round | 1971, 1980, 1988 Copa Libertadores champions |

;Notes

1. Argentina (ARG):
  - Argentinos Juniors (1985 Copa Libertadores champions) was not qualified due to be on Primera B Nacional a season before.

== Preliminary round ==
The matches were played from 15 June to 13 July.

| Pos | Team | Pld | W | D | L | GF | GA | GD | Pts | Qualification |
|---|---|---|---|---|---|---|---|---|---|---|
| 1 | (Brazil) Vasco da Gama | 4 | 2 | 1 | 1 | 5 | 4 | +1 | 7 | First round |
| 2 | (Uruguay) Peñarol | 4 | 1 | 2 | 1 | 6 | 7 | −1 | 5 | First round |
| 3 | (Uruguay) Nacional | 4 | 1 | 1 | 2 | 5 | 5 | 0 | 4 | |

Source: RSSSF
Rules for classification: 1) points; 2) goal difference; 3) number of goals scored.

| Home \ Away | NAC | PEN | VAS |
|---|---|---|---|
| Nacional | | 1–2 | 2–0 |
| Peñarol | 2–2 | | 1–1 |
| Vasco da Gama | 1–0 | 3–1 | |

Source: RSSSF
Legend: Blue = home team win; Yellow = draw; Red = away team win.

== Group stage ==
The matches were played from 26 August to 30 October.

=== Group 1 ===
| Pos | Team | Pld | W | D | L | GF | GA | GD | Pts | Qualification |
|---|---|---|---|---|---|---|---|---|---|---|
| 1 | (Chile) Colo-Colo | 6 | 3 | 2 | 1 | 12 | 9 | +3 | 11 | Semifinals |
| 2 | (Brazil) Cruzeiro | 6 | 3 | 0 | 3 | 9 | 10 | −1 | 9 | |
| 3 | (Argentina) Independiente | 6 | 2 | 2 | 2 | 9 | 9 | 0 | 8 | |
| 4 | (Argentina) Boca Juniors | 6 | 1 | 2 | 3 | 7 | 9 | −2 | 5 | |

Source: RSSSF
Rules for classification: 1) points; 2) goal difference; 3) number of goals scored.

| Home \ Away | BOC | COL | CRU | IND |
|---|---|---|---|---|
| Boca Juniors | | 2–2 | 1–0 | 1–1 |
| Colo-Colo | 2–1 | | 4–2 | 2–0 |
| Cruzeiro | 2–1 | 2–0 | | 2–1 |
| Independiente | 2–1 | 2–2 | 3–1 | |

Source: RSSSF
Legend: Blue = home team win; Yellow = draw; Red = away team win.

=== Group 2 ===
| Pos | Team | Pld | W | D | L | GF | GA | GD | Pts | Qualification |
|---|---|---|---|---|---|---|---|---|---|---|
| 1 | (Brazil) São Paulo | 6 | 3 | 2 | 1 | 15 | 8 | +7 | 11 | Semifinals |
| 2 | (Brazil) Flamengo | 6 | 3 | 1 | 2 | 10 | 7 | +3 | 10 | |
| 3 | (Paraguay) Olimpia | 6 | 1 | 3 | 2 | 6 | 9 | −3 | 6 | |
| 4 | (Argentina) Vélez Sarsfield | 6 | 1 | 2 | 3 | 6 | 13 | −7 | 5 | |

Source: RSSSF
Rules for classification: 1) points; 2) goal difference; 3) number of goals scored.

| Home \ Away | FLA | OLI | SAO | VEL |
|---|---|---|---|---|
| Flamengo | | 3–3 | 3–2 | 0–1 |
| Olimpia | 0–1 | | 0–0 | 1–0 |
| São Paulo | 1–0 | 4–1 | | 5–1 |
| Vélez Sarsfield | 0–3 | 1–1 | 3–3 | |

Source: RSSSF
Legend: Blue = home team win; Yellow = draw; Red = away team win.

=== Group 3 ===
| Pos | Team | Pld | W | D | L | GF | GA | GD | Pts | Qualification |
|---|---|---|---|---|---|---|---|---|---|---|
| 1 | (Argentina) River Plate | 6 | 5 | 0 | 1 | 17 | 9 | +8 | 15 | Semifinals |
| 2 | (Brazil) Vasco da Gama | 6 | 3 | 1 | 2 | 9 | 12 | −3 | 10 | |
| 3 | (Brazil) Santos | 6 | 2 | 1 | 3 | 11 | 12 | −1 | 7 | |
| 4 | (Argentina) Racing | 6 | 0 | 2 | 4 | 11 | 15 | −4 | 2 | |

Source: RSSSF
Rules for classification: 1) points; 2) goal difference; 3) number of goals scored.

| Home \ Away | RAC | RIV | SAN | VAS |
|---|---|---|---|---|
| Racing | | 2–3 | 2–2 | 2–3 |
| River Plate | 3–2 | | 3–2 | 5–1 |
| Santos | 3–2 | 2–1 | | 1–2 |
| Vasco da Gama | 1–1 | 0–2 | 2–1 | |

Source: RSSSF
Legend: Blue = home team win; Yellow = draw; Red = away team win.

=== Group 4 ===
| Pos | Team | Pld | W | D | L | GF | GA | GD | Pts | Qualification |
|---|---|---|---|---|---|---|---|---|---|---|
| 1 | (Colombia) Atlético Nacional | 6 | 3 | 1 | 2 | 9 | 7 | +2 | 10 | Semifinals |
| 2 | (Uruguay) Peñarol | 6 | 2 | 2 | 2 | 10 | 10 | 0 | 8 | |
| 3 | (Argentina) Estudiantes | 6 | 2 | 2 | 2 | 8 | 8 | 0 | 8 | |
| 4 | (Brazil) Grêmio | 6 | 1 | 3 | 2 | 9 | 11 | −2 | 6 | |

Source: RSSSF
Rules for classification: 1) points; 2) goal difference; 3) number of goals scored.

| Home \ Away | ANA | EST | GRE | PEN |
|---|---|---|---|---|
| Atlético Nacional | | 2–0 | 3–1 | 1–0 |
| Estudiantes | 1–0 | | 0–0 | 3–1 |
| Grêmio | 2–2 | 3–2 | | 1–1 |
| Peñarol | 3–1 | 2–2 | 3–2 | |

Source: RSSSF
Legend: Blue = home team win; Yellow = draw; Red = away team win.

== Knockout phase ==
In the knockout phase, the four group winners played a single-elimination tournament. Each tie was played on a home-and-away two-legged basis.

=== Bracket ===
Semifinals
1 | (Argentina) River Plate | 2 | 1 | 3
4 | (Colombia) Atlético Nacional | 0 | 2 | 2
3 | (Brazil) São Paulo | 3 | 1 | 4
2 | (Chile) Colo-Colo | 1 | 0 | 1

Finals
(Brazil) São Paulo | 0 | 1 | 1
(Argentina) River Plate | 0 | 2 | 2

=== Semifinals ===
The matches were played on 5 November, 6 November, 26 November and 27 November.

| Team 1 | Agg. | Team 2 | 1st leg | 2nd leg |
|---|---|---|---|---|
| São Paulo (Brazil) | 4–1 | (Chile) Colo-Colo | 3–1 | 1–0 |
| River Plate (Argentina) | 3–2 | (Colombia) Atlético Nacional | 2–0 | 1–2 |

=== Finals ===
The matches were played on 5 November, 6 November, 26 November and 27 November.

| Team 1 | Agg. | Team 2 | 1st leg | 2nd leg |
|---|---|---|---|---|
| São Paulo (Brazil) | 1–2 | (Argentina) River Plate | 0–0 | 1–2 |

4 December 1997
21:45 UTC−3

| São Paulo (Brazil) | 0–0 | (Argentina) River Plate |

Estádio Cícero Pompeu de Toledo (Morumbi), São Paulo
Attendance: 47,549
Referee: Mario Sánchez Yantén (Chile)

17 December 1997
21:45 UTC−3

| River Plate (Argentina) | 2–1 | (Brazil) São Paulo |
|---|---|---|
| Salas 46' 58' | | 53' Dodô |

Estadio Antonio Vespucio Liberti (El Monumental), Buenos Aires
Attendance: 81,521
Referee: Ubaldo Aquino (Paraguay)

River Plate won 2–1 on aggregate.

1997 Supercopa
Sudamericana winners

First title

== Top goalscorers ==
| Pos | Name | Club | Goals |
|---|---|---|---|
| 1 | (Chile) Ivo Basay | (Chile) Colo-Colo | 8 |
| 2 | (Chile) Marcelo Salas | (Argentina) River Plate | 7 |
| 3 | (Brazil) Dodô | (Brazil) São Paulo | 5 |
| 4 | (Argentina) Martín Fúriga | (Argentina) Estudiantes | 4 |
| 4 | (Brazil) Marcelo Ramos | (Brazil) Cruzeiro | 4 |
| 4 | (Brazil) Sávio | (Brazil) Flamengo | 4 |
| 4 | (Argentina) Martín Vilallonga | (Argentina) Racing | 4 |

== See also ==
- List of Copa Libertadores winners
- 1997 Copa Libertadores
- 1998 Recopa Sudamericana
