= Dodô (footballer, born 2000) =

Brazilian association football player

Personal information
- Full name: Paulo Henrique Athanazio
- Date of birth: 25 February 2000 (age 26)
- Place of birth: Brazil
- Position: Midfielder

Team information
- Current team: Botafogo-SP
- Number: 12

Youth career
- 2017–2018: Comercial-SP
- 2018–2019: Botafogo-SP

Senior career*
Years	Team	Apps	(Gls)
2019–	Botafogo-SP	13	(1)
- * Club domestic league appearances and goals as of 07:55, 21 June 2019 (UTC)

Paulo Henrique Athanazio, commonly referred to as Dodô, is a Brazilian footballer who plays as a midfielder for Botafogo-SP.

== Career ==
Dodô came through the youth ranks at Comercial-SP, signing for Botafogo-SP in 2018 and playing in the Under 20 Campeonato Paulista and Copa São Paulo de Futebol Júnior in 2019. His performance in a friendly between the U20 and Senior teams at Botafogo-SP in April 2019 earned him a call into the senior squad.

He made his national league debut in 2019 Campeonato Brasileiro Série B as a substitute against Vila Nova on 18 May 2019, but a contractual issue prevented him making more appearances and he returned to work with the U20 side.
