= Sidney Moraes =

Brazilian football coach and former player

Personal information
- Full name: Sidney Moraes de Almeida Júnior
- Date of birth: 3 March 1977 (age 49)
- Place of birth: Ituiutaba, Brazil
- Height: 1.77 m (5 ft 10 in)
- Position: Midfielder

Senior career*
Years	Team	Apps	(Gls)
1997–1999	São Paulo	28	(0)
2000	Sport	24	(1)
2001–2003	Fluminense	60	(2)
2004	Guarani	14	(1)
2004–2005	Penafiel	27	(0)
2005–2006	Braga	13	(0)
2006–2008	Al-Khaleej		
2008	Al-Wahda		
2008–2009	Trofense	1	(0)
2009	Santo André	6	(0)
2009–2010	Ittihad Kalba		
2011	Boa Esporte		

Managerial career
- 2012–2013: Boa Esporte
- 2013: Icasa
- 2014: Ponte Preta
- 2014: Vila Nova
- 2014: Náutico
- 2015: Paysandu
- 2017–2018: Boa Esporte
- 2019: URT
- 2019: Fluminense (assistant)
- 2020: Boa Esporte
- 2022: Icasa
- 2022: Ferroviário
- 2023: ASA
- * Club domestic league appearances and goals

Sidney Moraes de Almeida Júnior (born 3 March 1977 in Ituiutaba, Minas Gerais), known as Sidney Moraes, is a Brazilian football coach and former player who played as a defensive midfielder.

== Honours ==
=== Player ===
São Paulo

- Campeonato Paulista: 1998

Sport

- Campeonato Paulista: 2000
- Copa do Nordeste: 2000

Fluminense

- Campeonato Carioca: 2002

=== Manager ===
Boa Esporte

- Taça Minas Gerais: 2012
