= Alexandre Rotweiller =

Brazilian footballer (born 1979)

Personal information
- Full name: Alexandre Benedito Messiano
- Date of birth: 19 February 1979 (age 47)
- Place of birth: Brotas, Brazil
- Height: 1.75 m (5 ft 9 in)
- Position: Midfielder

Youth career
- 1994-1995: Rio Branco

Senior career*
Years	Team	Apps	(Gls)
1995-1996	Guarani		
1997	Rio Branco (SP)		
1997-2004	São Paulo	216	(2)
2002	→ Internacional (loan)		
2004–2005	Vitória de Guimarães		
2005	Atlético Mineiro		
2006	Corinthians (AL)		
2006–2007	Académica		
2007	Corinthians (AL)		
2008	Noroeste		
2009	América de Natal		
2010	Inter de Santa Maria		
2010–2011	Botafogo (SP)		
2011	Funorte		
2011-2012	Monte Azul		
2013	São José (SP)		
2014	São Carlos		
2015	São Mateus (ES)		

International career
1999-2000	Brazil Olympic	0	(0)
- * Club domestic league appearances and goals

Alexandre Benedito Messiano (born on 19 February 1979), also known as Alexandre Rotweiller, is a Brazilian retired professional football player who last played for the São Carlos in 2014. He was included in the Brazilian Olympic team at the 2000 Summer Olympics in Sydney.

== Career ==
=== Club career ===
He played at the youth team of Rio Branco de Americana. He played for Guarani before arriving in São Paulo where he played from 1997 to 2004.

=== Olympic career ===
He was included in the Brazilian Olympic team as a standby player at the 2000 Summer Olympics in Sydney.
