= 1995 Supercopa Libertadores =

1995 Supercopa Libertadores 1995 Supercopa Sudamericana João Havelange

Tournament details
- Dates: 13 September – 6 December
- Teams: 17 (from 6 confederations)

Final positions
- Champions: (Argentina) Independiente (2nd title)
- Runners-up: (Brazil) Flamengo

Tournament statistics
- Matches played: 34
- Goals scored: 93 (2.74 per match)
- Top scorer(s): (Uruguay) Enzo Francescoli (7 goals)

The 1995 Supercopa Libertadores was the eighth season of the Supercopa Libertadores, a club football tournament for past Copa Libertadores winners. Independiente, who beat Flamengo 2–1 on aggregate in the final, won the competition for the second consecutive year.

1994 Copa Libertadores winners Vélez Sársfield took part in the Supercopa Sudamericana for the first time, taking the number of participants to 17.

== Teams ==
Association	Team (Berth)	Entry stage	Qualification method
(Argentina) Argentina; 7 berths	Independiente (Argentina 1)	Preliminary round	1964, 1965, 1972, 1973, 1974, 1975, 1984 Copa Libertadores champions
(Argentina) Argentina; 7 berths	Estudiantes (Argentina 2)	Preliminary round	1968, 1969, 1970 Copa Libertadores champions
(Argentina) Argentina; 7 berths	Boca Juniors (Argentina 3)	Preliminary round	1977, 1978 Copa Libertadores champions
(Argentina) Argentina; 7 berths	Vélez Sarsfield (Argentina 4)	Preliminary round	1994 Copa Libertadores champions
(Argentina) Argentina; 7 berths	River Plate (Argentina 5)	Preliminary round	1986 Copa Libertadores champions
(Argentina) Argentina; 7 berths	Argentinos Juniors (Argentina 6)	Preliminary round	1985 Copa Libertadores champions
(Argentina) Argentina; 7 berths	Racing (Argentina 7)	Preliminary round	1967 Copa Libertadores champions
(Brazil) Brazil; 5 berths	São Paulo (Brazil 1)	Preliminary round	1992, 1993 Copa Libertadores champions
(Brazil) Brazil; 5 berths	Santos (Brazil 2)	Preliminary round	1962, 1963 Copa Libertadores champions
(Brazil) Brazil; 5 berths	Grêmio (Brazil 3)	Preliminary round	1983 Copa Libertadores champions
(Brazil) Brazil; 5 berths	Flamengo (Brazil 4)	Preliminary round	1981 Copa Libertadores champions
(Brazil) Brazil; 5 berths	Cruzeiro (Brazil 5)	Preliminary round	1976 Copa Libertadores champions
(Chile) Chile; 1 berth	Colo-Colo (Chile 1)	Preliminary round	1991 Copa Libertadores champions
(Colombia) Colombia; 1 berth	Atlético Nacional (Colombia 1)	Preliminary round	1989 Copa Libertadores champions
(Paraguay) Paraguay; 1 berth	Olimpia (Paraguay 1)	Preliminary round	1979, 1990 Copa Libertadores champions
(Uruguay) Uruguay; 2 berths	Peñarol (Uruguay 1)	Preliminary round	1960, 1961, 1966, 1982, 1987 Copa Libertadores champions
(Uruguay) Uruguay; 2 berths	Nacional (Uruguay 2)	Preliminary round	1971, 1980, 1988 Copa Libertadores champions

== Preliminary round ==
The matches were played from 13 September to 18 October.

With 17 teams taking part, the first round consisted of 7 two-legged ties and a round robin group consisting of the remaining 3 teams.

Team 1	Agg.	Team 2	1st leg	2nd leg
Independiente (Argentina)	3–3 (3-2 p)	(Brazil) Santos	1–1	2–2
Argentinos Juniors (Argentina)	2–5	(Colombia) Atlético Nacional	1–3	1–2
Grêmio (Brazil)	6–4	(Argentina) Racing	3–1	3–3
Peñarol (Uruguay)	5–5 (6-7 p)	(Argentina) River Plate	2–3	3–2
Cruzeiro (Brazil)	1–0	(Chile) Colo-Colo	1–0	0–0
Vélez Sarsfield (Argentina)	2–6	(Brazil) Flamengo	2–3	0–3
Nacional (Uruguay)	6–2	(Argentina) Estudiantes	4–0	2–2

Team 1	Score	Team 2
Olimpia (Paraguay)	1–1	(Argentina) Boca Juniors
São Paulo (Brazil)	1–0	(Argentina) Boca Juniors
Boca Juniors (Argentina)	1–2	(Paraguay) Olimpia
Olimpia (Paraguay)	1–2	(Brazil) São Paulo
Boca Juniors (Argentina)	2–3	(Brazil) São Paulo
São Paulo (Brazil)	0–3	(Paraguay) Olimpia

Pos	Team	Pld	W	D	L	GF	GA	GD	Pts	Qualification
1	(Brazil) São Paulo	4	3	0	1	6	6	0	9	Quarterfinals
2	(Paraguay) Olimpia	4	2	1	1	7	4	+3	7	
3	(Argentina) Boca Juniors	4	0	1	3	4	7	−3	1	

Source: RSSSF
Rules for classification: 1) points; 2) goal difference; 3) number of goals scored.

== Knockout phase ==
=== Bracket ===
Quarterfinals
(Colombia) Atlético Nacional	1	0	1
(Argentina) Independiente	0	2	2
(Brazil) Grêmio	2	2	4 (2)
(Argentina) River Plate (pen.)	1	3	4 (4)
(Brazil) Cruzeiro (pen.)	0	1	1 (4)
(Brazil) São Paulo	1	0	1 (2)
(Uruguay) Nacional	0	0	0
(Brazil) Flamengo	1	1	2

Semifinals
(Argentina) Independiente (pen.)	2	0	2 (4)
(Argentina) River Plate	2	0	2 (1)
(Brazil) Cruzeiro	0	1	1
(Brazil) Flamengo	1	3	4

Finals
(Argentina) Independiente	2	0	2
(Brazil) Flamengo	0	1	1

=== Quarterfinals ===
The matches were played from 24 October to 2 November.

Team 1	Agg.	Team 2	1st leg	2nd leg
Atlético Nacional (Colombia)	1–2	(Argentina) Independiente	1–0	0–2
Grêmio (Brazil)	4–4 (2–4 p)	(Argentina) River Plate	2–1	2–3
Cruzeiro (Brazil)	1–1 (4–2 p)	(Brazil) São Paulo	0–1	1–0
Nacional (Uruguay)	0–2	(Brazil) Flamengo	0–1	0–1

=== Semifinals ===
The matches were played from 15 November to 23 November.

Team 1	Agg.	Team 2	1st leg	2nd leg
Independiente (Argentina)	2–2 (4–1 p)	(Argentina) River Plate	2–2	0–0
Cruzeiro (Brazil)	1–4	(Brazil) Flamengo	0–1	1–3

=== Finals ===
Team 1	Agg.	Team 2	1st leg	2nd leg
Independiente (Argentina)	2–1	(Brazil) Flamengo	2–0	0–1

Independiente won 2-1 on aggregate.

1995 Supercopa
Sudamericana winners

Independiente
Second title

== See also ==
- List of Copa Libertadores winners
- 1995 Copa Libertadores
- 1996 Recopa Sudamericana
