= Fabiano (footballer, born 1978) =

Brazilian footballer

Personal information
- Full name: Fabiano Pereira da Costa
- Date of birth: 6 April 1978 (age 48)
- Place of birth: Marília, Brazil
- Height: 1.81 m (5 ft 11 1/2 in)
- Position: Midfielder

Youth career
- São Paulo

Senior career*
Years	Team	Apps	(Gls)
1994–2001	São Paulo		
2001	Portuguesa		
2001–2002	Internacional		
2002–2003	Santos		
2003	Al-Ettifaq		
2003–2004	Albacete	12	(1)
2004–2008	Necaxa		(23)
2008	Puebla	11	(2)
2009–2010	Atlético Mineiro	18	(0)
2009	→ Sport (loan)	26	(8)
2011	Avaí	17	(0)
2012	Audax-SP	0	(0)
2013–	XV de Piracicaba	0	(0)

International career^{‡}
2000	Brazil U23		
- * Club domestic league appearances and goals as of 16 October 2010 ‡ National team caps and goals as of 16 October 2010

Fabiano Pereira da Costa (born 6 April 1978) is a former footballer who last played as a midfielder for XV de Piracicaba.

== Career ==
Born in Marília, Brazil, Fabiano began his professional career with São Paulo in 1996, where he remained until 2001, when he moved to Portuguesa. He moved again in 2002, playing for Santos for a year, before transferring to Spain, where he played for Albacete Balompié during the 2003–04 season.

Following his stay with Albacete, Fabiano moved to Necaxa, where he appeared in 16 games during the 2004 Apertura, scoring three goals.

He was traded to Puebla F.C. for the Apertura 2008 season, on 12 March 2009 Clube Atlético Mineiro bought midfielder, the ex player of São Paulo FC, arrives from Puebla ( Mexican club ). Fabiano has signed with the Brazilian club until 31 December 2010.

Fabiano competed for Brazil at the 2000 Summer Olympics.
