= Hernán Díaz =

Argentine footballer (born 1965)

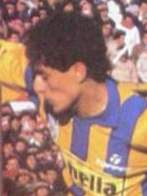

Personal information
- Full name: Hernán Edgardo Díaz
- Date of birth: February 26, 1965 (age 61)
- Place of birth: Barrancas, Santa Fe, Argentina
- Height: 1.75 m (5 ft 9 in)
- Position: Right back

Senior career*
Years	Team	Apps	(Gls)
1985	Rosario Central	3	(0)
1986	Los Andes	16	(3)
1986–1989	Rosario Central	102	(6)
1989–1999	River Plate	253	(13)
2000	Colón	10	(2)
2000–2001	River Plate	27	(2)
Total		411	(26)

International career
1987–1998	Argentina	28	(3)
- * Club domestic league appearances and goals

Hernán Edgardo Díaz (born February 26, 1965) is an Argentine retired football right back. During his club career he played for Rosario Central, Los Andes, River Plate and Colón de Santa Fe.

== Early career ==
Díaz started his career in the Argentine 2nd division with Rosario Central in 1985, after a short spell with Los Andes he returned to Rosario to help the club win the 1986-1987 Primera Division Argentina. His performances earned him a place in the national team and he represented Argentina at the Copa América 1987 and 1989.

== River Plate ==
Díaz joined River Plate in 1989, helping the club to win the 1989-1990 title in his first season he went on to win 8 league titles with the club as well as the Copa Libertadores in 1996 and the Supercopa Sudamericana in 1997. His 10 titles as a player make him the second most decorated player in the history of Club Atlético River Plate, second only to his longtime teammate Leonardo Astrada's 11.

During his time at River Díaz played for Argentina at the 1994 FIFA World Cup.

== Later career ==
Díaz left River to join Colón de Santa Fe in 2000 but returned for one last season with River in 2000–2001.

== Honours ==
Rosario Central

- Primera División Argentina: 1986–87

River Plate

- Primera División Argentina: 1989–90, Apertura 1991, Apertura 1993, Apertura 1994, Apertura 1996, Clausura 1997, Apertura 1997, Apertura 1999
- Copa Libertadores: 1996
- Supercopa Sudamericana: 1997

== Facts ==
- Díaz is the second most decorated player in the history of Club Atlético River Plate with 10 titles.
- Díaz played 73 games in the Copa Libertadores, scoring 7 goals, the only Argentine to have played more Libertadores games was Julio César Falcioni with 76.
