= Zé Carlos (footballer, born 1967) =

Brazilian footballer (1967–2024)

Personal information
- Full name: José Carlos de Almeida
- Date of birth: 14 November 1967
- Place of birth: Presidente Bernardes, São Paulo, Brazil
- Date of death: 25 October 2024 (aged 56)
- Place of death: Osasco, São Paulo, Brazil
- Height: 1.71 m (5 ft 7 in)
- Position: Defender

Senior career*
Years	Team	Apps	(Gls)
1990	São José		
1991–1992	Nacional (SP)		
1993	São Caetano		
1994	Portuguesa		
1995	União São João		
1996	Juventude		
1997	Matonense		
1997–2000	São Paulo		
2001	Ponte Preta		
2002	Grêmio		
2003–2004	Joinville		
2005	Portuguesa		

International career
1998	Brazil	1	(0)
- * Club domestic league appearances and goals

José Carlos de Almeida (14 November 1967 – 25 October 2024), best known as Zé Carlos, was a Brazilian footballer who played as a defender.

Zé Carlos started his career in 1990, and played for São José, Nacional, São Caetano, Portuguesa, União São João, São Paulo, Juventude, Matonense, Ponte Preta, Grêmio, and Joinville.

He last played for Portuguesa in 2005 until May.

== Background ==
Zé Carlos was born in Presidente Bernardes, São Paulo on 14 October 1967. He died from a cardiac arrest in Osasco, on 25 October 2024, at the age of 56.

== International career ==
Zé Carlos was called up for the Brazil national team's squad for the 1998 FIFA World Cup despite having never even been named for the senior squad, replacing Flávio Conceição. He played his sole national match in the 1998 FIFA World Cup semifinal match against Netherlands since Cafu was suspended.
