= 2003 São Paulo FC season =

São Paulo
2003 season
- Chairman: Marcelo Portugal Gouvêa
- Manager: Oswaldo de Oliveira (until 1 May); Roberto Rojas
- Série A: 3rd (in 2004 Copa Libertadores)
- Campeonato Paulista: Runners-up
- Copa do Brasil: Quarter-finals
- Copa Sudamericana: Semi-finals
- Top goalscorer: League: Luís Fabiano (29); All: Luís Fabiano (46)
- Highest home attendance: 71,732 ( v Corinthians in the Campeonato Paulista)
- Lowest home attendance: 3,471 ( v Gama in the Copa do Brasil)

The 2003 season was São Paulo's 74th season since club's existence. In this year São Paulo became a runner-up of Campeonato Paulista, being defeated by rival Corinthians in finals. At the Copa do Brasil, national cup, reached the quarterfinals falling in front of Goiás due Away goal rule with 0–0 (away); 1–1 (home). The club arrived in third place final in the first time when Série A was disputed in accumulated points system. In his first participation in Copa Sudamericana reached semifinals losing to Argentine club River Plate in penalty shootouts for 2–4 in a match that had fights and aggressions between players of both teams. The featured of year was the striker Luís Fabiano which scored 46 goals in whole season, 29 only in league.

== Squad ==
- Final squad

Note: Flags indicate national team as defined under FIFA eligibility rules; some limited exceptions apply. Players may hold more than one non-FIFA nationality.

No.	Pos.	Nation	Player
—	GK	BRA	Rogério Ceni
—	GK	BRA	Roger
—	DF	BRA	Gabriel
—	DF	BRA	Jean
—	DF	URU	Diego Lugano
—	DF	BRA	Fábio Santos
—	DF	BRA	Gustavo Nery
—	DF	BRA	Fabiano
—	DF	BRA	Edcarlos
—	DF	BRA	Júlio Santos
—	DF	BRA	Leonardo Moura
—	DF	BRA	Alexandre

No.	Pos.	Nation	Player
—	MF	BRA	Carlos Alberto
—	MF	BRA	Adriano
—	MF	BRA	Fábio Simplício
—	MF	BRA	Souza
—	MF	BRA	Aílton
—	MF	BRA	Ricardinho
—	MF	BRA	Marco Antônio
—	FW	BRA	Luís Fabiano
—	FW	BRA	Diego Tardelli
—	FW	BRA	Rico
—	FW	BRA	Kléber
—	FW	BRA	Thiago Ribeiro

== Statistics ==
=== Scorers ===
Position	Nation	Playing position	Name	Campeonato Paulista	Copa do Brasil	Campeonato Brasileiro	Copa Sudamericana	Friendly match	Total
1	(Brazil)	FW	Luís Fabiano	8	8	29	1	0	46
2	(Brazil)	FW	Diego Tardelli	0	0	9	3	1	13
=	(Brazil)	DF	Gustavo Nery	4	0	3	2	4	13
3	(Brazil)	MF	Fábio Simplício	2	0	7	2	1	12
4	(Brazil)	FW	Kléber	1	1	3	5	0	10
5	(Brazil)	FW	Reinaldo	1	3	4	0	0	8
6	(Brazil)	MF	Kaká	5	0	2	0	0	7
7	(Brazil)	MF	Júlio Baptista	1	2	3	0	0	6
=	(Brazil)	FW	Rico	0	0	4	2	0	6
8	(Brazil)	MF	Souza	0	0	3	2	0	5
9	(Brazil)	DF	Fabiano	1	2	1	0	0	4
=	(Brazil)	FW	Itamar	4	0	0	0	0	4
10	(Brazil)	DF	Gabriel	0	1	2	0	0	3
=	(Brazil)	DF	Jean	0	0	3	0	0	3
11	(Brazil)	MF	Carlos Alberto	0	0	2	0	0	2
=	(Uruguay)	DF	Diego Lugano	0	0	1	1	0	2
=	(Brazil)	MF	Ricardinho	0	0	1	0	1	2
=	(Brazil)	GK	Rogério Ceni	0	0	2	0	0	2
12	(Brazil)	MF	Adriano	0	0	1	0	0	1
=	(Brazil)	MF	Aílton	0	0	1	0	0	1
=	(Brazil)	FW	Dill	0	0	0	0	1	1
=	(Chile)	MF	Claudio Maldonado	1	0	0	0	0	1
=	(Brazil)	DF	Leonardo Moura	1	0	0	0	0	1
=	(Brazil)	MF	Marco Antônio	0	0	0	0	1	1
/	/	/	Own Goals	0	0	0	0	0	0
			Total	29	17	81	18	9	154

=== Managers performance ===
Name	Nationality	From	To	P	W	D	L	GF	GA	Win%
Oswaldo de Oliveira	Brazil	26 January	1 May	24	12	6	6	59	34	58%
Roberto Rojas	Chile	4 May	14 December	52	28	13	11	95	65	62%

=== Overall ===
Games played	76 (11 Campeonato Paulista, 8 Copa do Brasil, 46 Campeonato Brasileiro, 8 Copa Sudamericana, 3 Friendly match)
Games won	40 (6 Campeonato Paulista, 4 Copa do Brasil, 22 Campeonato Brasileiro, 6 Copa Sudamericana, 2 Friendly match)
Games drawn	18 (2 Campeonato Paulista, 3 Copa do Brasil, 12 Campeonato Brasileiro, 1 Copa Sudamericana, 1 Friendly match)
Games lost	17 (3 Campeonato Paulista, 1 Copa do Brasil, 12 Campeonato Brasileiro, 1 Copa Sudamericana, 0 Friendly match)
Goals scored	153
Goals conceded	98
Goal difference	+55
Best result	6–0 (H) v Juventus – Campeonato Paulista – 2003.1.30; 6–0 (H) v São Raimundo (AM) – Copa do Brasil – 2003.3.13
Worst result	2–5 (A) v Paysandu – Campeonato Brasileiro – 2003.4.27
Top scorer	Luís Fabiano (46 goals)

Source: São Paulo FC

== Friendlies ==
27 March International	São Paulo (Brazil)	1–1	(Libya) Al-Ittihad	São Paulo
	Dill 47'		Marei 68'	Stadium: Estádio Cícero Pompeu de Toledo (Morumbi)

10 September National	Ituano	1–2	São Paulo	Itu
	Jabá 55'		Ricardinho 45'; Marco Antônio 73'	Stadium: Estádio Municipal Doutor Novelli Júnior; Attendance: 1,314; Referee: Luís Flávio de Oliveira

15 November International	Bolton Wanderers (England)	3–6	(Brazil) São Paulo	Horwich
	Okocha 6'; Jardel 9'; Ibrahim Ba 53'	Report	Gustavo Nery 30', 63', 64', 68'; Fábio Simplício 42'; Diego Tardelli 60'	Stadium: Reebok Stadium; Attendance: 2,238; Referee: Mark Halsey

== Official competitions ==
=== Campeonato Paulista ===
26 January Group 2	Paulista	2–1	São Paulo	Jundiaí
11:00 (UTC-3)	Thiago 19'; Luís Paulo 40'	Report	Fábio Simplício 20'	Stadium: Estádio Doutor Jayme Pinheiro de Ulhôa Cintra (Jayme Cintra); Referee: Sálvio Spínola Fagundes Filho

30 January Group 2	São Paulo	6–0	Juventus	São Paulo
20:30 (UTC-3)	Kaká 9', 55', 80'; Gustavo Nery 41'; Fábio Simplício 65'; Leonardo Moura 74'	Report		Stadium: Estádio Cícero Pompeu de Toledo (Morumbi); Referee: Rodrigo Guarizo Ferreira do Amaral

2 February Group 2	Internacional	0–3	São Paulo	Limeira
11:00 (UTC-3)		Report	Kléber 18'; Kaká 60'; Gustavo Nery 88'	Stadium: Estádio Major José Levy Sobrinho (Limeirão); Referee: Paulo Cesar de Oliveira

9 February Group 2	São Paulo	1–1	Portuguesa Santista	São Paulo
17:00 (UTC-3)	Kaká 82'	Report	Souza 21'	Stadium: Estádio Cícero Pompeu de Toledo (Morumbi); Referee: Sílvia Regina de Oliveira

15 February Group 2	Santos	1–2	São Paulo	Santos
18:00 (UTC-3)	Ricardo Oliveira 43'	Report	Gustavo Nery 29'; Luís Fabiano 83'	Stadium: Estádio Urbano Caldeira (Vila Belmiro); Referee: Paulo César de Oliveira

23 February Group 2	São Paulo	2–2	Santo André	São Paulo
16:00 (UTC-3)	Luís Fabiano 33'; Gustavo Nery 36'	Report	Wésley Brasilia 59'; Denni 69'	Stadium: Estádio Cícero Pompeu de Toledo (Morumbi); Referee: Romildo Correia

26 February Quarterfinal	São Paulo	4–2	Santo André	São Paulo
20:30 (UTC-3)	Itamar 24', 58', 64'; Maldonado 52'	Report	Romerito 43'; Aílton 60'	Stadium: Estádio Cícero Pompeu de Toledo (Morumbi); Referee: Luiz Marcelo Cansian

6 March Semifinals	São Paulo	5–0	Portuguesa Santista	São Paulo
21:00 (UTC-3)	Júlio Baptista 27'; Luís Fabiano 36', 41', 62'; Itamar 86'	Report		Stadium: Estádio Cícero Pompeu de Toledo (Morumbi); Referee: Sálvio Spínola Fagundes Filho

9 March Semifinals	Portuguesa Santista	0–1	São Paulo	Santos
11:00 (UTC-3)		Report	Luís Fabiano 70' (pen.)	Stadium: Estádio Urbano Caldeira (Vila Belmiro); Attendance: 4,997; Referee: Rodrigo Martins Cintra

16 March Finals	Corinthians	3–2	São Paulo	São Paulo
18:00 (UTC-3)	Rogério 29'; Fábio Luciano 68'; Gil 83'	Report	Luís Fabiano 33'; Reinaldo 76'	Stadium: Estádio Cícero Pompeu de Toledo (Morumbi); Attendance: 46,633; Referee: Cléber Wellington Abade

22 March Finals	São Paulo	2–3	Corinthians	São Paulo
18:00 (UTC-3)	Luís Fabiano 49'; Fabiano 62'	Report	Liédson 21'; Jorge Wagner 45+2', 88'	Stadium: Estádio Cícero Pompeu de Toledo (Morumbi); Attendance: 71,732; Referee: Sálvio Spínola Fagundes Filho

==== Record ====
Final Position	Points	Matches	Wins	Draws	Losses	Goals For	Goals Away	Win%
2nd	20	11	6	2	3	29	14	60%

=== Copa do Brasil ===
19 February Round of 64	São Raimundo	2–0	São Paulo	Manaus
21:45 (UTC-3)	Guará 43'; Delmo 57'	Report		Stadium: Estádio Vivaldo Lima (Vivaldão); Attendance: 42,000; Referee: Marcos Café

12 March Round of 64	São Paulo	6–0	São Raimundo	São Paulo
20:30 (UTC-3)	Luís Fabiano 1', 18', 38', 66', 82'; Fabiano 76'	Report		Stadium: Estádio Cícero Pompeu de Toledo (Morumbi); Attendance: 18,375; Referee: Leonardo Gaciba da Silva

26 March Round of 32	Gama	2–2	São Paulo	Brasília
21:40 (UTC-3)	Gustavo Nery 65' (o.g.); Leonardo Manzi 83'	Report	Reinaldo 45+1'; Júlio Baptista 61'	Stadium: Estádio Nacional de Brasília (Mané Garrincha); Referee: Lourival Dias Filho

2 April Round of 32	São Paulo	5–1	Gama	São Paulo
21:40 (UTC-3)	Luís Fabiano 60'; Gabriel 69'; Kléber 81'; Reinaldo 83'; Fabiano 87'	Report	Nen 23'	Stadium: Estádio Cícero Pompeu de Toledo (Morumbi); Attendance: 3,471; Referee: Alexandre Lourenço Barreto

9 April Round of 16	Figueirense	0–2	São Paulo	Florianópolis
20:30 (UTC-3)		Report	Luís Fabiano 46'; Júlio Baptista 79'	Stadium: Estádio Orlando Scarpelli; Referee: Carlos Eugênio Simon

1 May Round of 16	São Paulo	1–0	Figueirense	São Paulo
15:30 (UTC-3)	Reinaldo 67'	Report		Stadium: Estádio Cícero Pompeu de Toledo (Morumbi); Attendance: 12,386; Referee: Alício Pena Júnior

7 May Quarterfinals	Goiás	0–0	São Paulo	Goiânia
21:40 (UTC-3)		Report		Stadium: Estádio do Governo do Estado de Goiás (Serra Dourada); Referee: Wilson de Souza Mendonça

15 May Quarterfinals	São Paulo	1–1	Goiás	São Paulo
21:40 (UTC-3)	Luís Fabiano 37'	Report	Caíco 17' (pen.)	Stadium: Estádio Cícero Pompeu de Toledo (Morumbi); Attendance: 13,603; Referee: Márcio Rezende de Freitas

==== Record ====
Final Position	Points	Matches	Wins	Draws	Losses	Goals For	Goals Away	Win%
6th	15	8	4	3	1	17	6	62%

=== Campeonato Brasileiro ===
30 March Round 1	Juventude	2–2	São Paulo	Caxias do Sul
16:00 (UTC-3)	Hugo 36'; Geufer 89'	Report	Luís Fabiano 54'; Júlio Baptista 61'	Stadium: Estádio Alfredo Jaconi; Attendance: 8,754; Referee: Paulo Henrique Bezerra

6 April Round 2	São Paulo	2–4	Cruzeiro	São Paulo
18:00 (UTC-3)	Luís Fabiano 49', 62'	Report	Alex 11'; Deivid 14', 54', 69'	Stadium: Estádio Cícero Pompeu de Toledo (Morumbi); Attendance: 5,580; Referee: Giuliano Bozzano

13 April Round 3	Criciúma	1–1	São Paulo	Criciúma
16:00 (UTC-3)	Luciano Almeida 40'	Report	Luís Fabiano 7'	Stadium: Estádio Heriberto Hülse; Attendance: 14,391; Referee: Alício Pena Júnior

17 April Round 4	São Paulo	3–1	Fortaleza	São Paulo
20:30 (UTC-3)	Ricardinho 3'; Reinaldo 9'; Gabriel 89'	Report	Chiquinho 15'	Stadium: Estádio Cícero Pompeu de Toledo (Morumbi); Attendance: 4,256; Referee: Edílson Soares da Silva

20 April Round 5	São Paulo	3–1	Vasco da Gama	São Paulo
16:00 (UTC-3)	Luís Fabiano 30'; Souza 40'; Rogério Ceni 87'	Report	Marcelinho Carioca 56'	Stadium: Estádio Cícero Pompeu de Toledo (Morumbi); Attendance: 10,275; Referee: Carlos Eugênio Simon

27 April Round 6	Paysandu	5–2	São Paulo	Belém
18:00 (UTC-3)	Róbson 26', 28', 33'; Lecheva 65'; Iarley 76'	Report	Reinaldo 57'; Luís Fabiano 86'	Stadium: Estádio Olímpico do Pará (Mangueirão); Attendance: 30,101; Referee: Wilson Souza Mendonça

4 May Round 7	São Paulo	3–2	Figueirense	São Paulo
16:00 (UTC-3)	Luís Fabiano 55', 80'; Gustavo Nery 90'	Report	Sandro Hiroshi 15'; Luiz Fernando 46'	Stadium: Estádio Cícero Pompeu de Toledo (Morumbi); Attendance: 5,668; Referee: Jorge Fernando Rabello

11 May Round 8	Atlético Mineiro	2–2	São Paulo	Belo Horizonte
16:00 (UTC-3)	Ferrugem 11'; Lúcio Flávio 66'	Report	Luís Fabiano 22'; Kaká 35'	Stadium: Estádio Governador Magalhães Pinto (Mineirão); Attendance: 8,712; Referee: Carlos Eugênio Simon

18 May Round 9	São Paulo	2–0	Paraná	São Paulo
18:00 (UTC-3)	Kaká 18'; Aílton 66'	Report		Stadium: Estádio Cícero Pompeu de Toledo (Morumbi); Attendance: 3,754; Referee: Wagner Tardelli Azevedo

25 May Round 10	Grêmio	1–2	São Paulo	Porto Alegre
16:00 (UTC-3)	Ânderson Lima 33'	Report	Júlio Baptista 9'; Luís Fabiano 59'	Stadium: Estádio Olímpico Monumental; Attendance: 9,307; Referee: Márcio Rezende de Freitas

1 June Round 11	Santos	3–2	São Paulo	Santos
16:00 (UTC-3)	Diego 16'; Fabiano 59'; Renato 81'	Report	Luís Fabiano 34'; Rico 73'	Stadium: Estádio Urbano Caldeira (Vila Belmiro); Attendance: 13,032; Referee: Sálvio Spindola Fagundes Filho

8 June Round 12	São Paulo	2–2	Bahia	São Paulo
18:00 (UTC-3)	Reinaldo 8', 76'	Report	Nonato 67', 88'	Stadium: Estádio Cícero Pompeu de Toledo (Morumbi); Attendance: 5,506; Referee: Walace Nascimento Valente

15 June Round 13	Corinthians	1–2	São Paulo	São Paulo
16:00 (UTC-3)	Anderson 26'	Report	Fábio Simplício 36'; Jean 59'	Stadium: Estádio Cícero Pompeu de Toledo (Morumbi); Attendance: 17,128; Referee: Cléber Wellington Abade

21 June Round 14	São Paulo	1–0	Goiás	São Paulo
18:00 (UTC-3)	Júlio Baptista 83'	Report		Stadium: Estádio Cícero Pompeu de Toledo (Morumbi); Attendance: 7,047; Referee: Edivaldo Soares

29 June Round 15	Guarani	0–1	São Paulo	Campinas
16:00 (UTC-3)		Report	Fábio Simplício 43'	Stadium: Estádio Brinco de Ouro da Princesa; Attendance: 11,697; Referee: Sílvia Regina de Oliveira

5 July Round 16	São Paulo	1–1	São Caetano	São Paulo
16:00 (UTC-3)	Luís Fabiano 81'	Report	Mateus 25'	Stadium: Estádio Cícero Pompeu de Toledo (Morumbi); Attendance: 14,875; Referee: Romildo Correa

9 July Round 17	Coritiba	0–2	São Paulo	Curitiba
21:40 (UTC-3)		Report	Luís Fabiano 15'; Jean 25'	Stadium: Estádio Major Antônio (Couto Pereira); Attendance: 8,215; Referee: Luciano Augusto Almeida

13 July Round 18	Fluminense	1–3	São Paulo	Rio de Janeiro
16:00 (UTC-3)	Sorato 31'	Report	Luís Fabiano 12', 86'; Diego Tardelli 63'	Stadium: Estádio Jornalista Mário Filho (Maracanã); Attendance: 5,234; Referee: Evandro Rogério Roman

17 July Round 19	São Paulo	2–0	Atlético Paranaense	São Paulo
20:30 (UTC-3)	Rico 62'; Gustavo Nery 89'	Report		Stadium: Estádio Cícero Pompeu de Toledo (Morumbi); Attendance: 13,492; Referee: Márcio Rezende de Freitas

20 July Round 20	Vitória	0–2	São Paulo	Salvador
16:00 (UTC-3)		Report	Fabiano 6'; Rico 29'	Stadium: Estádio Manoel Barradas (Barradão); Attendance: 5,722; Referee: Fernando Rogério Assunção

24 July Round 21	São Paulo	1–2	Ponte Preta	São Paulo
21:30 (UTC-3)	Luís Fabiano 55'	Report	Jean 45'; Rafael Santos 90'	Stadium: Estádio Cícero Pompeu de Toledo (Morumbi); Attendance: 21,526; Referee: Rodrigo Martins Cintra

27 July Round 22	Flamengo	1–1	São Paulo	Rio de Janeiro
16:00 (UTC-3)	Anderson 90+1'	Report	Diego Tardelli 30'	Stadium: Estádio Jornalista Mário Filho (Maracanã); Attendance: 12,781; Referee: Lourival Dias Lima Filho

2 August Round 23	São Paulo	0–2	Internacional	São Paulo
18:00 (UTC-3)		Report	Wilson 48'; Nilmar 79'	Stadium: Estádio Cícero Pompeu de Toledo (Morumbi); Attendance: 24,855; Referee: Wagner Tardelli Azevedo

6 August Round 24	Cruzeiro	1–1	São Paulo	Belo Horizonte
21:40 (UTC-3)	Mota 77'	Report	Gustavo Nery 50'	Stadium: Estádio Governador Magalhães Pinto (Mineirão); Attendance: 30,331; Referee: Giuliano Bozzano

9 August Round 25	São Paulo	3–1	Juventude	São Paulo
18:00 (UTC-3)	Carlos Alberto 38'; Diego Tardelli 40', 61'	Report	Geufer 81'	Stadium: Estádio Cícero Pompeu de Toledo (Morumbi); Attendance: 4,421; Referee: Álvaro Azeredo Quelhas

16 August Round 26	São Paulo	0–0	Criciúma	Ribeirão Preto
18:00 (UTC-3)		Report		Stadium: Estádio Santa Cruz; Attendance: 17,145; Referee: Jorge Fernando Rabello

20 August Round 27	Fortaleza	0–2	São Paulo	Fortaleza
21:40 (UTC-3)		Report	Kléber 33'; Rico 88'	Stadium: Estádio Governador Plácido Castelo (Castelão); Attendance: 34,794; Referee: Wilson de Souza Mendonça

24 August Round 28	Vasco da Gama	3–2	São Paulo	Rio de Janeiro
16:00 (UTC-3)	Beto 42'; Henrique 62'; Edmundo 66'	Report	Luís Fabiano 51', 63'	Stadium: Estádio Vasco da Gama (São Januário); Attendance: 3,626; Referee: Carlos Eugênio Simon

30 August Round 29	São Paulo	1–0	Paysandu	São José do Rio Preto
18:00 (UTC-3)	Luís Fabiano 67'	Report		Stadium: Estádio Benedito Teixeira (Teixeirão); Attendance: 15,235; Referee: Márcio Rezende de Freitas

14 September Round 30	Figueirense	2–2	São Paulo	Florianópolis
16:00 (UTC-3)	Triguinho 38'; Sandro Gaúcho 83'	Report	Luís Fabiano 74'; Adriano 78'	Stadium: Orlando Scarpelli; Attendance: 14,634; Referee: Wágner Tardeli de Azevedo

21 September Round 31	São Paulo	2–2	Atlético Mineiro	São Paulo
18:00 (UTC-3)	Kléber 22'; Rogério Ceni 25'	Report	Alex Alves 8'; Fábio Júnior 90+2'	Stadium: Estádio Cícero Pompeu de Toledo (Morumbi); Attendance: 13,815; Referee: Jorge Fernando Rabello

24 September Round 32	Paraná	4–2	São Paulo	Curitiba
21:40 (UTC-3)	Marquinhos 34'; Renaldo 59', 72'; Fernandinho 79'	Report	Luís Fabiano 31', 41'	Stadium: Estádio Major Antônio (Couto Pereira); Attendance: 3,651; Referee: Alício Pena Júnior

27 September Round 33	São Paulo	3–1	Grêmio	São Paulo
16:00 (UTC-3)	Fábio Simplício 60'; Kléber 64'; Jean 89'	Report	Ânderson Lima 80' (pen.)	Stadium: Estádio Cícero Pompeu de Toledo (Morumbi); Attendance: 4,607; Referee: Wilson de Souza Mendonça

4 October Round 34	São Paulo	1–2	Santos	São Paulo
18:00 (UTC-3)	Luís Fabiano 66'	Report	William 37', 55'	Stadium: Estádio Cícero Pompeu de Toledo (Morumbi); Attendance: 35,790; Referee: Paulo César de Oliveira

8 October Round 35	Bahia	3–0	São Paulo	Salvador
21:40 (UTC-3)	Preto Casagrande 12'; Guto 68'; Danilo 88'	Report		Stadium: Estádio Octávio Mangabeira (Fonte Nova); Attendance: 14,984; Referee: Héber Roberto Lopes

12 October Round 36	São Paulo	3–0	Corinthians	São Paulo
16:00 (UTC-3)	Diego Tardelli 76'; Carlos Alberto 87'; Fábio Simplício 90'	Report		Stadium: Estádio Cícero Pompeu de Toledo (Morumbi); Attendance: 13,070; Referee: Sílvia Regina de Oliveira

18 October Round 37	Goiás	3–1	São Paulo	Goiânia
16:00 (UTC-3)	Grafite 18'; Araújo 37'; Dimba 55'	Report	Fábio Simplício 52'	Stadium: Estádio do Governo do Estado de Goiás (Serra Dourada); Attendance: 30,237; Referee: Luís Antônio Silva Santos

23 October Round 38	São Paulo	3–3	Guarani	São Paulo
20:30 (UTC-3)	Luís Fabiano 9', 64'; Fábio Simplício 11'	Report	Wágner 50'; Rafael Silva 54'; Rodrigão 90+4'	Stadium: Estádio Cícero Pompeu de Toledo (Morumbi); Attendance: 3,617; Referee: Anselmo da Costa

26 October Round 39	São Caetano	0–1	São Paulo	São Caetano do Sul
16:00 (UTC-3)		Report	Luís Fabiano 47'	Stadium: Estádio Municipal (Anacleto Campanella); Attendance: 8,324; Referee: Luis Marcelo Vicentin Cansian

2 November Round 40	São Paulo	1–0	Coritiba	São Paulo
18:00 (UTC-3)	Luís Fabiano 13'	Report		Stadium: Estádio Cícero Pompeu de Toledo (Morumbi); Attendance: 11,378; Referee: Sérgio Cristiano Nascimento

5 November Round 41	São Paulo	1–0	Fluminense	São Paulo
21:40 (UTC-3)	Luís Fabiano 90+3'	Report		Stadium: Estádio Cícero Pompeu de Toledo (Morumbi); Attendance: 4,449; Referee: Cléver Assunção Gonçalves

9 November Round 42	Atlético Paranaense	4–3	São Paulo	Curitiba
16:00 (UTC-3)	Fernandinho 37' (pen.), 45+1'; Ricardinho 50'; Jádson 77'	Report	Luís Fabiano 51' (pen.); Lugano 72'; Diego Tardelli 75'	Stadium: Arena Joaquim Américo Guimarães (Arena da Baixada); Attendance: 13,069; Referee: Jorge Fernando Rabello

23 November Round 43	São Paulo	3–1	Vitória	São Paulo
18:00 (UTC-3)	Diego Tardelli 30'; Souza 41'; Fábio Simplício 84'	Report	Alecsandro 21'	Stadium: Estádio Cícero Pompeu de Toledo (Morumbi); Attendance: 6,232; Referee: Álvaro Azeredo Quelhas

30 November Round 44	Ponte Preta	1–2	São Paulo	Campinas
18:00 (UTC-3)	Luís Carlos 49'	Report	Gabriel 58'; Souza 74'	Stadium: Estádio Moisés Lucarelli; Attendance: 10,882; Referee: Paulo César de Oliveira

7 December Round 45	Internacional	1–1	São Paulo	Porto Alegre
18:00 (UTC-3)	Cidimar 84'	Report	Diego Tardelli 15'	Stadium: Estádio José Pinheiro Borda (Beira-Rio); Attendance: 37,991; Referee: Wagner Tardelli Azevedo

14 December Round 46	São Paulo	1–3	Flamengo	São Paulo
18:00 (UTC-3)	Diego Tardelli 12'	Report	Rafael 43'; Edílson 46', 66'	Stadium: Estádio Cícero Pompeu de Toledo (Morumbi); Attendance: 14,420; Referee: Leonardo Gaciba da Silva

==== Record ====
Final Position	Points	Matches	Wins	Draws	Losses	Goals For	Goals Away	Win%
3rd	78	46	22	12	12	81	67	56%

=== Copa Sudamericana ===
30 July First stage	Grêmio (Brazil)	0–4	(Brazil) São Paulo	Porto Alegre
21:40 (UTC-3)		Report	Fábio Simplício 8', 51'; Kléber 41'; Diego Tardelli 90+1'	Stadium: Estádio Olímpico Monumental; Referee: Luciano Almeida (BRA)

3 September First stage	São Paulo (Brazil)	2–1	(Brazil) Vasco da Gama	São Paulo
21:40 (UTC-3)	Rico 6'; Kléber 21'	Report	Wellington 75'	Stadium: Estádio Cícero Pompeu de Toledo (Morumbi); Referee: Márcio Rezende de Freitas (BRA)

17 September Second stage	São Paulo (Brazil)	1–0	(Brazil) Fluminense	São Paulo
21:40 (UTC-3)	Kléber 1'	Report		Stadium: Estádio Cícero Pompeu de Toledo (Morumbi); Referee: Wilson de Souza Mendonça (BRA)

1 October Second stage	Fluminense (Brazil)	1–1	(Brazil) São Paulo	Rio de Janeiro
21:40 (UTC-3)	Jadílson 66'	Report	Lugano 80'	Stadium: Estádio Jornalista Mário Filho (Maracanã); Referee: Carlos Eugênio Simon (BRA)

29 October Quarterfinals	The Strongest (Bolivia)	1–4	(Brazil) São Paulo	La Paz
21:40 (UTC-3)	Cristaldo 67'	Report	Kléber 31', 78'; Luís Fabiano 68'; Gustavo Nery 88'	Stadium: Estadio Hernando Siles; Referee: Ubaldo Aquino (PAR)

12 November Quarterfinals	São Paulo (Brazil)	3–1	(Bolivia) The Strongest	São Paulo
21:40 (UTC-3)	Diego Tardelli 6'; Souza 35', 45'	Report	Álex da Rosa 20'	Stadium: Estádio Cícero Pompeu de Toledo (Morumbi); Referee: Carlos Torres (PAR)

26 November Semifinals	River Plate (Argentina)	3–1	(Brazil) São Paulo	Buenos Aires
21:50 (UTC-3)	Gallardo 11', 47'; Barrado 67'	Report	Gustavo Nery 42'	Stadium: River Plate Stadium (Monumental de Núñez); Referee: Gilberto Hidalgo (PER)

3 December Semifinals	São Paulo (Brazil)	2–0 (2–4 p)	(Argentina) River Plate	São Paulo
21:40 (UTC-3)	Rico 69'; Diego Tardelli 74'	Report		Stadium: Estádio Cícero Pompeu de Toledo (Morumbi); Attendance: 35,548; Referee: Jorge Larrionda (URU)
	Penalties
	Souza (penalty missed); Rogério Ceni (penalty scored); Lugano (penalty missed); Fábio Simplício (penalty scored)		(penalty scored) Domínguez; (penalty scored) Coudet; (penalty scored) Ludueña; (penalty scored) Tuzzio

==== Record ====
Final Position	Points	Matches	Wins	Draws	Losses	Goals For	Goals Away	Win%
3rd	19	8	6	1	1	18	7	79%
