= 2005 São Paulo FC season =

Football season

São Paulo
2005 season
- Chairman: Marcelo Portugal Gouvêa
- Manager: Émerson Leão (until April 17); Milton Cruz (caretaker, until April 30); Paulo Autuori
- Série A: 11th
- Campeonato Paulista: Champions (21st title)
- Copa Libertadores: Champions (3rd title)
- Copa Sudamericana: First round
- Club World Championship: Champions (3rd title)
- Top goalscorer: League: Amoroso (12); All: Rogério Ceni (21)
- Highest home attendance: 71,986 ( v Atlético Paranaense in the Copa Libertadores)
- Lowest home attendance: 2,170 ( v Brasiliense in the Campeonato Brasileiro)

The 2005 season was São Paulo's 76th season since club's existence. In this season Tricolor won the Campeonato Paulista, league of State of São Paulo for the 21st time and the continental cup, Copa Libertadores de America, beating Atlético Paranaense in the first final with teams from the same country of tournament history, winning by 4–0 in the second match, 5–1 in aggregate. The continental title enabled São Paulo to participate of FIFA Club World Championship in the end of season when the club became a world champion for the third time (2 Intercontinental Cups), defeating the English club, European champions Liverpool in the final with a single goal scored by Mineiro in the 27th minute of first time. In the Campeonato Brasileiro São Paulo finished in 11th position and was eliminated by Internacional in first round of Copa Sudamericana.

== Squad ==
- Final squad

Note: Flags indicate national team as defined under FIFA eligibility rules; some limited exceptions apply. Players may hold more than one non-FIFA nationality.

No.	Pos.	Nation	Player
1	GK	BRA	Rogério Ceni
2	DF	BRA	Cicinho
3	DF	BRA	Fabão
4	DF	BRA	Edcarlos
5	DF	URU	Diego Lugano
6	DF	BRA	Júnior
7	MF	BRA	Mineiro
8	MF	BRA	Josué
9	FW	BRA	Grafite
10	MF	BRA	Danilo
11	FW	BRA	Márcio Amoroso
12	FW	BRA	Christian

No.	Pos.	Nation	Player
13	DF	BRA	Alex Bruno
14	FW	BRA	Aloísio
15	MF	BRA	Denílson
16	DF	BRA	Fábio Santos
17	MF	BRA	Renan
18	DF	BRA	Flávio Donizete
19	FW	BRA	Thiago Ribeiro
20	MF	BRA	Richarlyson
21	MF	BRA	Souza
22	GK	BRA	Bosco
23	GK	BRA	Flávio Kretzer

== Competitions ==
=== Overall ===
Games played	79 (19 Campeonato Paulista, 14 Copa Libertadores, 42 Campeonato Brasileiro, 2 Copa Sudamericana, 2 Club World Cup )
Games won	41 (14 Campeonato Paulista, 9 Copa Libertadores, 16 Campeonato Brasileiro, 0 Copa Sudamericana, 2 Club World Cup)
Games drawn	18 (3 Campeonato Paulista, 4 Copa Libertadores, 10 Campeonato Brasileiro, 1 Copa Sudamericana, 0 Club World Cup)
Games lost	20 (2 Campeonato Paulista, 1 Copa Libertadores, 16 Campeonato Brasileiro, 1 Copa Sudamericana, 0 Club World Cup)
Goals scored	166
Goals conceded	107
Goal difference	+59
Best result	6–0 (H) v Marília – Campeonato Paulista – 2005.3.19
Worst result	0–3 (A) v Internacional – Campeonato Brasileiro – 2005.10.5; 0–3 (A) v Goiás – Campeonato Brasileiro – 2005.11.16
Top scorer	Rogério Ceni (21 goals)

Source: São Paulo FC

=== Scorers ===
Position	Nation	Playing position	Name	Campeonato Paulista	Copa Libertadores	Campeonato Brasileiro	Copa Sudamericana	Club World Cup	Total
1	(Brazil)	GK	Rogério Ceni	5	5	10	0	1	21
2	(Brazil)	FW	Amoroso	0	2	12	0	2	16
=	(Brazil)	FW	Diego Tardelli	11	4	1	0	0	16
3	(Brazil)	MF	Danilo	4	3	6	0	0	13
=	(Brazil)	FW	Grafite	9	4	0	0	0	13
4	(Brazil)	FW	Luizão	4	5	2	0	0	11
5	(Brazil)	DF	Cicinho	3	4	3	0	0	10
6	(Brazil)	FW	Christian	0	0	8	0	0	8
=	(Uruguay)	DF	Diego Lugano	1	1	6	0	0	8
7	(Brazil)	MF	Souza	1	2	3	1	0	7
8	(Brazil)	MF	Mineiro	0	0	4	1	1	6
9	(Brazil)	MF	Josué	4	0	1	0	0	5
10	(Brazil)	FW	Thiago Ribeiro	0	0	4	0	0	4
11	(Brazil)	DF	Edcarlos	0	1	2	0	0	3
=	(Brazil)	DF	Fabão	0	2	1	0	0	3
=	(Brazil)	MF	Hernanes	0	0	3	0	0	3
=	(Brazil)	DF	Júnior	2	0	1	0	0	3
=	(Brazil)	DF	Marco Antônio	3	0	0	0	0	3
=	(Brazil)	FW	Roger	0	0	3	0	0	3
12	(Brazil)	DF	Fábio Santos	0	0	1	0	0	1
=	(Brazil)	DF	Flávio Donizete	0	0	1	0	0	1
=	(Brazil)	FW	Paulo Matos	0	0	1	0	0	1
=	(Brazil)	MF	Renan	1	0	0	0	0	1
=	(Brazil)	MF	Richarlyson	0	0	1	0	0	1
=	(Brazil)	DF	Rodrigo	1	0	0	0	0	1
/	/	/	Own Goals	0	1	3	0	0	4
			Total	49	34	77	3	4	166

=== Managers performance ===
Name	Nationality	From	To	P	W	D	L	GF	GA	Win%
Emerson Leão	Brazil	20 January	21 April	23	16	5	2	61	29	77%
Milton Cruz	Brazil	21 April	30 April	3	0	2	1	3	4	22%
Paulo Autuori	Brazil	8 May	18 December	55	26	11	18	104	77	54%

== Official competitions ==
=== Campeonato Paulista ===
20 January Round 1	São Paulo	4–2	Ituano	São Paulo
20:30 (UTC−3)	Diego Tardelli 26'; Lugano 62'; Rodrigo 70'; Grafite 88'	(Report) (pt)	Ricardo Oliveira 35'; Rômulo 90+1'	Stadium: Estádio Cícero Pompeu de Toledo (Morumbi); Attendance: 6,527; Referee: Cléber Wellington Abade

23 January Round 2	América	3–4	São Paulo	São José do Rio Preto
18:00 (UTC−3)	Finazzi 17', 35', 88'	(Report) (pt)	Diego Tardelli 8'; Danilo 31'; Rogério Ceni 69'; Cicinho 76'	Stadium: Estádio Benedito Teixeira (Teixeirão); Attendance: 11,030; Referee: Anselmo da Costa

27 January Round 3	São Paulo	2–0	Internacional	São Paulo
20:30 (UTC−3)	Diego Tardelli 29', 46'	(Report) (pt)		Stadium: Estádio Cícero Pompeu de Toledo (Morumbi); Attendance: 5,947; Referee: Silvia Regina de Oliveira

30 January Round 4	São Paulo	2–1	União São João	São Paulo
18:10 (UTC−3)	Cicinho 18'; Diego Tardelli 45'	(Report) (pt)	Borges 84'	Stadium: Estádio Cícero Pompeu de Toledo (Morumbi); Attendance: 11,367; Referee: Philippe Lombard

5 February Round 5	União Barbarense	2–2	São Paulo	Santa Bárbara d'Oeste
18:10 (UTC−3)	Gilson Batata 77'; Du Lopes 83'	(Report) (pt)	Josué 5'; Diego Tardelli 27'	Stadium: Estádio Antônio Lins Ribeiro Guimarães; Attendance: 7,631; Referee: Sálvio Spinola Fagundes Filho

9 February Round 6	São Caetano	3–4	São Paulo	São Caetano do Sul
21:45 (UTC−3)	Luiz Claudio 4'; Anaílson 40'; Zé Luís 61'	(Report) (pt)	Diego Tardelli 10'; Marco Antônio 85'; Grafite 88'; Josué 90+2'	Stadium: Estádio Municipal Anacleto Campanella; Attendance: 8,096; Referee: Rodrigo Martins Cintra

12 February Round 7	São Paulo	4–1	Atlético Sorocaba	São Paulo
16:00 (UTC−3)	Grafite 13', 28', 61'; Josué 33'	(Report) (pt)	Luciano Henrique 31' (pen.)	Stadium: Estádio Cícero Pompeu de Toledo (Morumbi); Attendance: 16,333; Referee: Romildo Correia

20 February Round 8	Palmeiras	0–3	São Paulo	São Paulo
16:00 (UTC−3)		(Report) (pt)	Diego Tardelli 5'; Rogério Ceni 75'; Luizão 86'	Stadium: Estádio Cícero Pompeu de Toledo (Morumbi); Attendance: 36,832; Referee: Wilson Luiz Seneme

24 February Round 9	São Paulo	5–0	Portuguesa Santista	São Paulo
20:30 (UTC−3)	Cicinho 44'; Renan 57'; Diego Tardelli 61', 87'; Luizão 69'	(Report) (pt)		Stadium: Estádio Cícero Pompeu de Toledo (Morumbi); Attendance: 7,502; Referee: Luís Flávio de Oliveira

27 February Round 10	São Paulo	1–0	Corinthians	São Paulo
16:00 (UTC−3)	Danilo 51'	(Report) (pt)		Stadium: Estádio Cícero Pompeu de Toledo (Morumbi); Attendance: 50,708; Referee: Silvia Regina de Oliveira

6 March Round 11	Paulista	2–2	São Paulo	Jundiaí
16:00 (UTC−3)	Léo 9'; Cristian 74'	(Report) (pt)	Luizão 38'; Josué 79'	Stadium: Estádio Doutor Jayme Pinheiro de Ulhôa Cintra; Attendance: 8,779; Referee: Luís Flávio de Oliveira

12 March Round 12	São Paulo	1–0	Rio Branco	São Paulo
16:00 (UTC−3)	Rogério Ceni 73' (pen.)	(Report) (pt)		Stadium: Estádio Cícero Pompeu de Toledo (Morumbi); Attendance: 11,572; Referee: Marcelo Krochmalnik

19 March Round 13	São Paulo	6–0	Marília	São Paulo
16:00 (UTC−3)	Júnior 1'; Danilo 33', 45+1'; Marco Antônio 51'; Grafite 66'; Rogério Ceni 70'	(Report) (pt)		Stadium: Estádio Cícero Pompeu de Toledo (Morumbi); Attendance: 12,552; Referee: Bernardino Demonico Júnior

23 March Round 14	Guarani	1–2	São Paulo	Campinas
21:45 (UTC−3)	Juninho 56'	(Report) (pt)	Marco Antônio 60'; Grafite 70'	Stadium: Estádio Brinco de Ouro da Princesa; Attendance: 10,953; Referee: Wilson Luiz Seneme

26 March Round 15	São Paulo	3–1	Santo André	São Paulo
16:00 (UTC−3)	Diego Tardelli 4', 52'; Rogério Ceni 42' (pen.)	(Report) (pt)	Sandro Gaúcho 32'	Stadium: Estádio Cícero Pompeu de Toledo (Morumbi); Attendance: 30,375; Referee: Philippe Lombard

31 March Round 16	Portuguesa	2–1	São Paulo	São Paulo
20:30 (UTC−3)	Washington 22', 58'	(Report) (pt)	Júnior 40'	Stadium: Estádio Municipal Paulo Machado de Carvalho (Pacaembu); Attendance: 33,533; Referee: Anselmo da Costa

3 April Round 17	Santos	0–0	São Paulo	Mogi Mirim
16:00 (UTC−3)		(Report) (pt)		Stadium: Estádio Wílson de Barros; Attendance: 12,383; Referee: Wilson Luiz Seneme

9 April Round 18	São Paulo	1–2	Ponte Preta	São Paulo
16:00 (UTC−3)	Luizão 5'	(Report) (pt)	Roger 14', 46'	Stadium: Estádio Cícero Pompeu de Toledo (Morumbi); Attendance: 21,404; Referee: Edílson Pereira de Carvalho

17 April Round 19	Mogi Mirim	1–2	São Paulo	Mogi Mirim
16:00 (UTC−3)	Marcelo Rosa 56'	(Report) (pt)	Grafite 39'; Souza 64'	Stadium: Estádio Wílson de Barros; Referee: Sílvia Regina de Oliveira

==== Record ====
Final Position	Points	Matches	Wins	Draws	Losses	Goals For	Goals Away	Win%
1st	45	19	14	3	2	49	21	78%

=== Copa Libertadores ===
3 March Group 3	The Strongest (Bolivia)	3–3	(Brazil) São Paulo	La Paz
18:15 (UTC−4)	Cuba 23'; Sosa 39'; Escobar 54'	(Report)	Danilo 21'; Luizão 57'; Grafite 87'	Stadium: Estadio Hernando Siles; Attendance: 14,784; Referee: Gustavo Méndez (URU)

9 March Group 3	São Paulo (Brazil)	4–2	Universidad de Chile	São Paulo
21:45 (UTC−3)	Lugano 2'; Rogério Ceni 20'; Cicinho 47'; Grafite 64'	(Report)	Gioino 6', 38'	Stadium: Estádio Cícero Pompeu de Toledo (Morumbi); Attendance: 41,852; Referee: Jorge Larrionda (URU)

16 March Group 3	Quilmes (Argentina)	2–2	(Brazil) São Paulo	Quilmes
21:45 (UTC−3)	Osorio 12'; Caneo 76'	(Report)	Diego Tardelli 48'; Grafite 68'	Stadium: Estadio José Luis Meiszner; Referee: Oscar Ruiz (COL)

13 April Group 3	São Paulo (Brazil)	3–1	(Argentina) Quilmes	São Paulo
21:45 (UTC−3)	Diego Tardelli 31', 54'; Cicinho 81'	(Report)	Rueda 55'	Stadium: Estádio Cícero Pompeu de Toledo (Morumbi); Attendance: 38,703; Referee: Martín Vazquez (URU)

21 April Group 3	Universidad de Chile	1–1	(Brazil) São Paulo	Santiago
21:30 (UTC−4)	Gioino 47'	(Report)	Luizão 27'	Stadium: Estadio Nacional de Chile; Attendance: 40,125; Referee: Carlos Amarilla (PAR)

11 May Group 3	São Paulo (Brazil)	3–0	(Bolivia) The Strongest	São Paulo
21:45 (UTC−3)	Edcarlos 35'; Luizão 38'; Grafite 52'	(Report)		Stadium: Estádio Cícero Pompeu de Toledo (Morumbi); Attendance: 24,986; Referee: Horacio Elizondo (ARG)

18 May Round of 16	Palmeiras (Brazil)	0–1	(Brazil) São Paulo	São Paulo
21:45 (UTC−3)		(Report)	Cicinho 59'	Stadium: Estádio Palestra Itália; Attendance: 19,143; Referee: Sálvio Spínola (BRA)

25 May Round of 16	São Paulo (Brazil)	2–0	(Brazil) Palmeiras	São Paulo
21:45 (UTC−3)	Rogério Ceni 81' (pen.); Cicinho 89'	(Report)		Stadium: Estádio Cícero Pompeu de Toledo (Morumbi); Attendance: 60,345; Referee: Sálvio Spínola (BRA)

1 June Quarterfinals	São Paulo (Brazil)	4–0	(Mexico) UANL Tigres	São Paulo
21:45 (UTC−3)	Rogério Ceni 30', 58'; Luizão 39'; Souza 61'	(Report)		Stadium: Estádio Cícero Pompeu de Toledo (Morumbi); Attendance: 42,855; Referee: Daniel Giménez (ARG)

15 June Quarterfinals	UANL Tigres (Mexico)	2–1	(Brazil) São Paulo	San Nicolás
20:00 (UTC−5)	Silvera 61', 74'	(Report)	Souza 87'	Stadium: Estadio Universitario; Referee: Héctor Baldassi (ARG)

22 June Semifinals	São Paulo (Brazil)	2–0	(Argentina) River Plate	São Paulo
21:45 (UTC−3)	Danilo 76'; Rogério Ceni 89' (pen.)	(Report)		Stadium: Estádio Cícero Pompeu de Toledo (Morumbi); Attendance: 61,027; Referee: Gustavo Méndez (URU)

29 June Semifinals	River Plate (Argentina)	2–3	(Brazil) São Paulo	Buenos Aires
21:45 (UTC−3)	Farías 35'; Salas 84'	(Report)	Danilo 11'; Amoroso 59'; Fabão 80'	Stadium: Estadio Monumental; Attendance: 58,956; Referee: Rubén Selman (CHI)

6 July Finals	Atlético Paranaense (Brazil)	1–1	(Brazil) São Paulo	Porto Alegre
21:45 (UTC−3)	Aloísio 14'	(Report)	Durval 52' (o.g.)	Stadium: Estádio Beira-Rio; Referee: Jorge Larrionda (URU)

14 July Finals	São Paulo (Brazil)	4–0	(Brazil) Atlético Paranaense	São Paulo
21:45 (UTC−3)	Amoroso 16'; Fabão 52'; Luizão 70'; Diego Tardelli 89'	(Report)		Stadium: Estádio Cícero Pompeu de Toledo (Morumbi); Attendance: 71,986; Referee: Horacio Elizondo (ARG)

==== Record ====
Final Position	Points	Matches	Wins	Draws	Losses	Goals For	Goals Away	Win%
1st	31	14	9	4	1	34	14	73%

=== Campeonato Brasileiro ===
24 April Round 1	Fluminense	2–1	São Paulo	Rio de Janeiro
16:00 (UTC−3)	Tuta 28', 74'	(Report) (pt)	Souza 76'	Stadium: Estádio Jornalista Mário Filho (Maracanã); Attendance: 26,219; Referee: Héber Roberto Lopes

30 April Round 2	São Paulo	1–1	Paraná	São Paulo
18:10 (UTC−3)	Lugano 90'	(Report) (pt)	Daniel Marques 48'	Stadium: Estádio Cícero Pompeu de Toledo (Morumbi); Attendance: 3,623; Referee: Clever Assunção Gonçalves

8 May Round 3	Corinthians	1–5	São Paulo	São Paulo
16:00 (UTC−3)	Carlos Alberto 88' (pen.)	(Report) (pt)	Rogério Ceni 3' (pen.); Luizão 13', 47'; Danilo 16'; Cicinho 73'	Stadium: Estádio Municipal Paulo Machado de Carvalho (Pacaembu); Attendance: 17,490; Referee: Wilson Luiz Seneme

14 May Round 4	São Paulo	1–0	Coritiba	São Paulo
18:10 (UTC−3)	Fabão 69'	(Report) (pt)		Stadium: Estádio Cícero Pompeu de Toledo (Morumbi); Attendance: 6,401; Referee: Wagner Tardelli Azevedo

22 May Round 5	Vasco da Gama	3–1	São Paulo	Rio de Janeiro
16:00 (UTC−3)	Coutinho 36'; Alex Dias 48', 67'	(Report) (pt)	Danilo 2'	Stadium: Estádio Vasco da Gama (São Januário); Attendance: 14,399; Referee: Evandro Rogério Roman

28 May Round 6	São Paulo	1–1	Cruzeiro	São Paulo
18:10 (UTC−3)	Rogério Ceni 43' (pen.)	(Report) (pt)	Adriano 1'	Stadium: Estádio Cícero Pompeu de Toledo (Morumbi); Attendance: 7,371; Referee: Sérgio da Silva Carvalho

12 June Round 7	Paysandu	2–2	São Paulo	Belém
18:10 (UTC−3)	Róbson 39', 48'	(Report) (pt)	Rogério Ceni 19'; Roger 65'	Stadium: Estádio Estadual Jornalista Edgar Augusto Proença (Mangueirão); Attendance: 19,584; Referee: Leonardo Gaciba

19 June Round 8	São Paulo	1–0	Botafogo	São Paulo
18:10 (UTC−3)	Paulo Matos 76'	(Report) (pt)		Stadium: Estádio Cícero Pompeu de Toledo (Morumbi); Attendance: 4,180; Referee: Evandro Rogério Roman

25 June Round 9	São Paulo	1–3	Internacional	São Paulo
18:10 (UTC−3)	Souza 36'	(Report) (pt)	Iarley 30'; Fernandão 53'; Tinga 83'	Stadium: Estádio Cícero Pompeu de Toledo (Morumbi); Attendance: 3,509; Referee: Wagner Tardelli Azevedo

9 July Round 11	São Paulo	2–0	Flamengo	São Paulo
18:10 (UTC−3)	Júnior Baiano 60' (o.g.); Hernanes 90'	(Report) (pt)		Stadium: Estádio Cícero Pompeu de Toledo (Morumbi); Attendance: 4,123; Referee: Clever Assunção Gonçalves

17 July Round 12	Santos	2–1	São Paulo	Santos
16:00 (UTC−3)	Halisson 18'; Carlinhos 88'	(Report) (pt)	Hernanes 36'	Stadium: Estádio Urbano Caldeira (Vila Belmiro); Attendance: 8,648; Referee: Sálvio Spínola Fagundes Filho

20 July Round 13	Brasiliense	3–3	São Paulo	Taguatinga
21:45 (UTC−3)	Márcio Careca 18'; Régis 62'; Igor 90+3'	(Report) (pt)	Diego Tardelli 6'; Danilo 26'; Rogério Ceni 51'	Stadium: Estádio Elmo Serejo Farias (Boca do Jacaré); Attendance: 22,579; Referee: Elvécio Zequetto

23 July Round 14	São Paulo	0–1	São Caetano	São Paulo
18:10 (UTC−3)		(Report) (pt)	Canindé 78'	Stadium: Estádio Cícero Pompeu de Toledo (Morumbi); Attendance: 7,819; Referee: Luís Marcelo Vicentin Cansian

27 July Round 15	Atlético Mineiro	0–0	São Paulo	Belo Horizonte
21:45 (UTC−3)		(Report) (pt)		Stadium: Estádio Governador Magalhães Pinto (Mineirão); Attendance: 14,330; Referee: Djalma José Beltrami Teixeira

31 July Round 16	Juventude	2–1	São Paulo	Caxias do Sul
18:10 (UTC−3)	Jardel 36'; Enílton 48'	(Report) (pt)	Lugano 79'	Stadium: Estádio Alfredo Jaconi; Attendance: 5,835; Referee: Lourival Dias Lima Filho

4 August Round 17	São Paulo	3–3	Palmeiras	São Paulo
20:30 (UTC−3)	Amoroso 33', 35'; Danilo 42'	(Report) (pt)	Marcinho 48'; Gioino 82'; Warley 88'	Stadium: Estádio Cícero Pompeu de Toledo (Morumbi); Attendance: 14,810; Referee: Cleber Welington Abade

7 August Round 18	São Paulo	0–1	Goiás	São Paulo
18:10 (UTC−3)		(Report) (pt)	Souza 58'	Stadium: Estádio Cícero Pompeu de Toledo (Morumbi); Attendance: 7,009; Referee: Luiz Antônio Silva Santos

10 August Round 19	Figueirense	3–1	São Paulo	Florianópolis
21:45 (UTC−3)	Michel Bastos 32'; Adriano 33', 39'	(Report) (pt)	Amoroso 22'	Stadium: Estádio Orlando Scarpelli; Attendance: 6,614; Referee: Alicio Pena Junior

14 August Round 20	São Paulo	3–2	Fortaleza	São Paulo
18:10 (UTC−3)	Mineiro 2'; Amoroso 55'; Josué 63'	(Report) (pt)	Marcelo Lopes 14'; Fumagalli 38'	Stadium: Estádio Cícero Pompeu de Toledo (Morumbi); Attendance: 22,724; Referee: Leonardo Gaciba

20 August Round 21	Atlético Paranaense	4–2	São Paulo	Curitiba
18:10 (UTC−3)	Alan Bahia 42'; Ferreira 52', 57'; Jancarlos 88'	(Report) (pt)	Christian 30'; Amoroso 90+2'	Stadium: Estádio Joaquim Américo Guimarães (Arena da Baixada); Attendance: 20,396; Referee: Wagner Tardelli Azevedo

24 August Round 22	São Paulo	1–1	Fluminense	São Paulo
21:45 (UTC−3)	Tuta 80'	(Report) (pt)	Amoroso 82'	Stadium: Estádio Cícero Pompeu de Toledo (Morumbi); Attendance: 11,984; Referee: Carlos Eugênio Simon

28 August Round 23	Paraná	0–4	São Paulo	Maringá
16:00 (UTC−3)		(Report) (pt)	Rogério Ceni 31'; Lugano 36'; Amoroso 52'; Aderaldo 75' (o.g.)	Stadium: Estádio Willie Davids; Attendance: 12,780; Referee: Leonardo Gaciba

11 September Round 25	Coritiba	1–4	São Paulo	Curitiba
18:10 (UTC−3)	Capixaba 38'	(Report) (pt)	Rogério Ceni 20' (pen.); Christian 80'; Hernanes 83'; Cicinho 85'	Stadium: Estádio Major Antônio Couto Pereira; Attendance: 16,979; Referee: Alicio Pena Junior

18 September Round 26	São Paulo	4–2	Vasco da Gama	São Paulo
16:00 (UTC−3)	Amoroso 4', 39'; Christian 9'; Rogério Ceni 90+3' (pen.)	(Report) (pt)	Abedi 34'; Alex Dias 53' (pen.)	Stadium: Estádio Cícero Pompeu de Toledo (Morumbi); Attendance: 15,417; Referee: Heber Roberto Lopes

21 September Round 27	Cruzeiro	2–3	São Paulo	Belo Horizonte
21:45 (UTC−3)	Kelly 16'; Diego 55'	(Report) (pt)	Flávio Donizete 57'; Christian 61'; Rogério Ceni 71' (pen.)	Stadium: Estádio Governador Magalhães Pinto (Mineirão); Attendance: 23,787; Referee: Evandro Rogério Roman

24 September Round 28	São Paulo	4–1	Paysandu	São Paulo
16:00 (UTC−3)	Danilo 11', 90'; Christian 52'; Lugano 60'	(Report) (pt)	Balão 84'	Stadium: Estádio Cícero Pompeu de Toledo (Morumbi); Attendance: 18,612; Referee: Willian Marcelo de Souza Néri

2 October Round 29	Botafogo	1–1	São Paulo	Rio de Janeiro
18:10 (UTC−3)	Caio 60'	(Report) (pt)	Christian 17'	Stadium: Estádio Luso-Brasileiro; Attendance: 15,730; Referee: Carlos Eugênio Simon

5 October Round 30	Internacional	3–0	São Paulo	Porto Alegre
21:50 (UTC−3)	Fernandão 11', 14'; Rafael Sobis 90+3'	(Report) (pt)		Stadium: Estádio José Pinheiro Borda (Beira-Rio); Attendance: 12,407; Referee: Alício Pena Junior

11 October Round 31	São Paulo	3–2	Ponte Preta	São Paulo
20:30 (UTC−3)	Mineiro 8'; Christian 10'; Júnior 86'	(Report) (pt)	Fabão 22' (o.g.); Zé Carlos 69'	Stadium: Estádio Cícero Pompeu de Toledo (Morumbi); Attendance: 5,285; Referee: Wilson Luiz Seneme

16 October Round 32	Flamengo	1–6	São Paulo	Rio de Janeiro
16:00 (UTC−3)	Josafá 9'	(Report) (pt)	Edcarlos 3', 24'; Amoroso 43'; Thiago 87'; Mineiro 90'; Souza 90+1'	Stadium: Estádio Luso-Brasileiro; Attendance: 12,864; Referee: Alicio Pena Júnior

22 October Round 33	São Paulo	1–2	Santos	São Paulo
20:30 (UTC−3)	Amoroso 70'	(Report) (pt)	Renan 50' (o.g.); Geílson 61'	Stadium: Estádio Cícero Pompeu de Toledo (Morumbi); Attendance: 4,607; Referee: Leonardo Gaciba da Silva

27 October Round 34	São Paulo	1–2	Brasiliense	São Paulo
20:30 (UTC−3)	Cicinho 4'	(Report) (pt)	Igor 46', 69'	Stadium: Estádio Cícero Pompeu de Toledo (Morumbi); Attendance: 2,170; Referee: Edson Esperidião

30 October Round 35	São Caetano	0–1	São Paulo	São Caetano do Sul
18:10 (UTC−3)		(Report) (pt)	Neto 61' (o.g.)	Stadium: Estádio Municipal Anacleto Campanella; Attendance: 3,944; Referee: Wagner Tardelli de Azevedo

2 November Round 36	São Paulo	2–2	Atlético Mineiro	São Paulo
20:30 (UTC−3)	Roger 27'; Rogério Ceni 55'	(Report) (pt)	Cáceres 18'; Marques 30'	Stadium: Estádio Cícero Pompeu de Toledo (Morumbi); Attendance: 2,992; Referee: Wilson de Souza Mendonça

5 November Round 37	São Paulo	3–1	Juventude	São Paulo
16:00 (UTC−3)	Christian 17'; Mineiro 23'; Roger 53'	(Report) (pt)	Didé 85'	Stadium: Estádio Cícero Pompeu de Toledo (Morumbi); Attendance: 8,801; Referee: Luiz Antônio Silva Santos

12 November Round 38	Palmeiras	2–1	São Paulo	São Paulo
18:10 (UTC−3)	Daniel 66'; Juninho Paulista 70'	(Report) (pt)	Richarlyson 61'	Stadium: Estádio Municipal Paulo Machado de Carvalho (Pacaembu); Attendance: 5,252; Referee: Djalma José Beltrami Teixeira

16 November Round 39	Goiás	3–0	São Paulo	Goiânia
20:30 (UTC−3)	Roni 2'; André Leone 27'; Jardel 76'	(Report) (pt)		Stadium: Estádio do Governo do Estado de Goiás (Serra Dourada); Attendance: 12,526; Referee: Antônio Hora Filho

19 November Round 40	São Paulo	4–2	Figueirense	São Paulo
16:00 (UTC−3)	Fábio Santos 7'; Thiago 24', 68', 86'	(Report) (pt)	Adriano 17'; Cléber 39'	Stadium: Estádio Cícero Pompeu de Toledo (Morumbi); Attendance: 3,908; Referee: Sérgio da Silva Carvalho

27 November Round 41	Fortaleza	1–0	São Paulo	Fortaleza
16:00 (UTC−3)	Clodoaldo 73'	(Report) (pt)		Stadium: Estádio Plácido Aderaldo Castelo (Castelão); Attendance: 55,461; Referee: Jamir Carlos Garcez

4 December Round 42	São Paulo	3–1	Atlético Paranaense	São Paulo
16:00 (UTC−3)	Lugano 9', 22'; Rogério Ceni 34'	(Report) (pt)	Ferreira 46'	Stadium: Estádio Cícero Pompeu de Toledo (Morumbi); Attendance: 23,565; Referee: Cláudio Luciano Mercante Júnior

==== Rescheduled matches ====
Round 10

2 July (annulled)	Ponte Preta	1–0	São Paulo	Campinas
18:10 (UTC−3)	Evando 33'	(Report) (pt)		Stadium: Estádio Moisés Lucarelli; Attendance: 10,720; Referee: Edilson Pereira de Carvalho

19 October (replayed)	Ponte Preta	2–0	São Paulo	Campinas
21:50 (UTC−3)	Izaías 20'; Élson 70' (pen.)	(Report) (pt)		Stadium: Estádio Moisés Lucarelli; Attendance: 14,000; Referee: Evandro Rogério Roman

Round 24

7 September (annulled)	São Paulo	3–2	Corinthians	São Paulo
16:00 (UTC−3)	Amoroso 28', 88' (pen.); Souza 75'	(Report) (pt)	Nilmar 2'; Rosinei 85'	Stadium: Estádio Cícero Pompeu de Toledo (Morumbi); Attendance: 46,335; Referee: Edilson Pereira de Carvalho

24 October (replayed)	São Paulo	1–1	Corinthians	São Paulo
20:30 (UTC−3)	Amoroso 51' (pen.)	(Report) (pt)	Carlos Alberto 41'	Stadium: Estádio Cícero Pompeu de Toledo (Morumbi); Attendance: 26,994; Referee: Carlos Eugênio Simon

==== Record ====
Final Position	Points	Matches	Wins	Draws	Losses	Goals For	Goals Away	Win%
11th	58	42	16	10	16	77	67	46%

=== Copa Sudamericana ===
17 August First stage	Internacional (Brazil)	2–1	(Brazil) São Paulo	Porto Alegre
19:30 (UTC−3)	Élder Granja 35'; Gustavo 58'	(Report)	Mineiro 39'	Stadium: Estádio José Pinheiro Borda (Beira-Rio); Referee: Mario Rezende (BRA)

1 September First stage	São Paulo (Brazil)	1–1	(Brazil) Internacional	São Paulo
21:30 (UTC−3)	Souza 41'	(Report)	Fernandão 68' (pen.)	Stadium: Estádio Cícero Pompeu de Toledo (Morumbi); Referee: Héber Lopes (ARG)

==== Record ====
Final Position	Points	Matches	Wins	Draws	Losses	Goals For	Goals Away	Win%
30th	1	2	0	1	1	2	3	16%

=== FIFA Club World Championship ===
14 December Semifinal	Al Ittihad (Saudi Arabia)	2–3	(Brazil) São Paulo	Tokyo
19:20 (UTC+9)	Noor 33'; Al-Montashari 68'	(Report)	Amoroso 16', 47'; Rogério Ceni 57' (pen.)	Stadium: Olympic Stadium; Attendance: 31,510; Referee: Alain Sars (FRA)

18 December Final	São Paulo (Brazil)	1–0	(England) Liverpool	Yokohama
19:20 (UTC+9)	Mineiro 27'	(Report)		Stadium: International Stadium; Attendance: 66,821; Referee: Benito Archundia (MEX)

==== Record ====
Final Position	Points	Matches	Wins	Draws	Losses	Goals For	Goals Away	Win%
1st	6	2	2	0	0	4	2	100%

== See also ==
- São Paulo FC
