= 2002 São Paulo FC season =

São Paulo
2002 season
- Chairman: Marcelo Portugal Gouvêa
- Manager: Nelsinho Baptista (until 12 May); Oswaldo de Oliveira
- Campeonato Brasileiro: Quarter-finals (in 2003 Copa Sudamericana)
- Torneio Rio – São Paulo: Runners-up
- Copa do Brasil: Semi-finals
- Supercampeonato Paulista: Champions (1st title)
- Copa dos Campeões: First stage
- Top goalscorer: League: Luís Fabiano (19); All: Reinaldo (31)
- Highest home attendance: 64,946 ( v Santos in the Campeonato Brasileiro)
- Lowest home attendance: 5,005 ( v Goiás in the Campeonato Brasileiro)

The 2002 season was São Paulo's 73rd season since club's existence. The club became a runners-up of Torneio Rio – São Paulo losing the final to rival Corinthians. Exceptionally this year the main clubs from state like Santos, Corinthians and Palmeiras along São Paulo did not participated of Campeonato Paulista to not overload the number of games in calendar, with two tournaments being disputed at same time, Torneio Rio – São Paulo and Campeonato Paulista, then was created only this year the Supercampeonato paulista played by Corinthians (Torneio Rio-São Paulo winners), São Paulo (Torneio Rio-São Paulo runners-up), Palmeiras (Torneio Rio-São Paulo third place) and Ituano (Campeonato Paulista winners). Tricolor won the title against Ituano, 2-2 (away); 4-1 (home). At Copa do Brasil was defeated again by Corinthians, this time in semifinal. In Copa dos Campeões was eliminated in group stage and quarterfinals in Série A losing to rival Santos.

== Squad ==
- Final squad

Note: Flags indicate national team as defined under FIFA eligibility rules; some limited exceptions apply. Players may hold more than one non-FIFA nationality.

No.	Pos.	Nation	Player
—	GK	BRA	Rogério Ceni
—	GK	BRA	Roger
—	DF	BRA	Gabriel
—	DF	BRA	Rafael
—	DF	ARG	Horacio Ameli
—	DF	BRA	Jean
—	DF	BRA	Gustavo Nery
—	DF	BRA	Júlio Santos
—	DF	BRA	Jorginho Paulista
—	DF	BRA	Wilson
—	DF	BRA	Reginaldo
—	DF	BRA	Régis
—	MF	CHI	Claudio Maldonado

No.	Pos.	Nation	Player
—	MF	BRA	Adriano
—	MF	BRA	Fábio Simplício
—	MF	BRA	Ricardinho
—	MF	BRA	Aílton
—	MF	BRA	Júlio Baptista
—	MF	BRA	Kaká
—	MF	BRA	Daniel Rossi
—	FW	BRA	Leandro Amaral
—	FW	BRA	Reinaldo
—	FW	BRA	Luís Fabiano
—	FW	BRA	Dill
—	FW	BRA	Oliveira

== Statistics ==
=== Scorers ===
Position	Nation	Playing position	Name	Torneio Rio-São Paulo	Copa do Brasil	Supercampeonato Paulista	Copa dos Campeões	Campeonato Brasileiro	Friendly match	Total
1	(Brazil)	FW	Reinaldo	7	7	3	0	12	2	31
2	(Brazil)	FW	França	19	5	0	0	0	0	24
3	(Brazil)	MF	Kaká	7	6	0	0	9	1	23
4	(Brazil)	FW	Luís Fabiano	0	0	0	2	19	0	21
5	(Brazil)	DF	Jean	2	1	0	0	2	0	5
=	(Brazil)	MF	Júlio Baptista	0	0	2	0	3	0	5
=	(Brazil)	GK	Rogério Ceni	3	1	0	0	1	0	5
=	(Brazil)	FW	Sandro Hiroshi	0	0	2	1	0	2	5
6	(Brazil)	FW	Adriano	2	0	2	0	0	0	4
=	(Brazil)	DF	Belletti	3	1	0	0	0	0	4
=	(Brazil)	MF	Ricardinho	0	0	0	0	4	0	4
=	(Brazil)	MF	Souza	3	1	0	0	0	0	4
7	(Brazil)	MF	Fábio Simplício	0	0	1	0	1	0	2
=	(Brazil)	DF	Gabriel	2	0	0	0	0	0	2
=	(Brazil)	DF	Gustavo Nery	2	0	0	0	0	0	2
=	(Brazil)	DF	Jorginho Paulista	0	0	0	0	2	0	2
=	(Brazil)	DF	Júlio Santos	0	0	0	0	2	0	2
8	(Brazil)	FW	Dill	0	0	0	0	1	0	1
=	(Brazil)	DF	Emerson	1	0	0	0	0	0	1
=	(Argentina)	DF	Horacio Ameli	0	0	0	0	1	0	1
=	(Brazil)	FW	Leandro Amaral	0	0	0	0	1	0	1
=	(Brazil)	DF	Reginaldo	0	0	0	0	0	1	1
=	(Brazil)	DF	Régis	0	0	0	0	1	0	1
=	(Brazil)	FW	Rico	0	0	0	0	0	1	1
=	(Brazil)	DF	Wilson	1	0	0	0	0	0	1
			Total	53	21	10	3	59	7	154

=== Managers performance ===
Name	Nationality	From	To	P	W	D	L	GF	GA	Win%
Nelsinho Baptista	Brazil	19 January	12 May	28	13	5	10	75	48	52%
Oswaldo de Oliveira	Brazil	19 May	14 November	35	20	7	8	81	50	64%

=== Overall ===
Games played	63 (19 Torneio Rio – São Paulo, 4 Supercampeonato Paulista, 9 Copa do Brasil, 3 Copa dos Campeões, 27 Campeonato Brasileiro, 1 Friendly match)
Games won	33 (8 Torneio Rio – São Paulo, 2 Supercampeonato Paulista, 5 Copa do Brasil, 1 Copa dos Campeões, 16 Campeonato Brasileiro, 1 Friendly match)
Games drawn	12 (5 Torneio Rio – São Paulo, 2 Supercampeonato Paulista, 0 Copa do Brasil, 1 Copa dos Campeões, 4 Campeonato Brasileiro, 0 Friendly match)
Games lost	18 (6 Torneio Rio – São Paulo, 0 Supercampeonato Paulista, 4 Copa do Brasil, 1 Copa dos Campeões, 7 Campeonato Brasileiro, 0 Friendly match)
Goals scored	154
Goals conceded	97
Goal difference	+57
Best result	7–0 (H) v Bangu - Torneio Rio – São Paulo - 2002.03.17
Worst result	0–3 (A) v São Caetano - Campeonato Brasileiro - 2002.09.07
Top scorer	Reinaldo (31 goals)

Source: São Paulo FC

== Friendlies ==
27 July International friendly	São Paulo (Brazil)	7–1	(Mexico) Deportivo Toluca	São Paulo
(UTC-3)	Sandro Hiroshi 20', 37'; Reinaldo 43', 47'; Kaká 69'; Rico 76'; Reginaldo 86'		Lozano 49'	Stadium: Morumbi; Attendance: 2,855; Referee: Marcelo Rogério

== Official competitions ==
=== Torneio Rio-São Paulo ===
19 January Round 1	Etti-Jundiaí	3–3	São Paulo	Jundiaí
16:00 (UTC-3)	Nenê 58'; Vágner Mancini 77'; Tiago 79'	(Report) (pt)	Reinaldo 12', 33'; Kaká 64'	Stadium: Jayme Cintra; Referee: Anselmo da Costa

27 January Round 2	São Paulo	2–3	Vasco da Gama	São Paulo
16:00 (UTC-3)	Kaká 46'; França 58'	(Report) (pt)	Romário 67', 69'; Euller 70'	Stadium: Morumbi; Referee: Carlos Eugênio Simon

30 January Round 3	Guarani	2–3	São Paulo	Campinas
20:30 (UTC-3)	Dudu 78'; Martinez 83'	(Report) (pt)	França 19', 20'; Rogério Ceni 81'	Stadium: Brinco de Ouro; Referee: Cléber Welington Abade

3 February Round 4	São Paulo	4–3	Fluminense	São Paulo
16:00 (UTC-3)	França 55' (pen.); Gabriel 66'; Souza 68'; Rogério Ceni 87'	(Report) (pt)	Fábio Mello 73'; Roger 84', 88'	Stadium: Morumbi; Attendance: 10,538; Referee: Alício Pena Júnior

9 February Round 5	Botafogo	2–2	São Paulo	Rio de Janeiro
16:00 (UTC-3)	Dodô 12', 27'	(Report) (pt)	Souza 38'; Jean 85'	Stadium: Maracanã; Referee: Luciano Augusto Almeida

17 February Round 6	Flamengo	2–4	São Paulo	Rio de Janeiro
16:00 (UTC-3)	Petkovic 59'; Juninho Paulista 80'	(Report) (pt)	Gustavo Nery 11'; França 68', 69'; Wilson 83'	Stadium: Maracanã; Referee: Héber Roberto Lopes

24 February Round 7	São Paulo	4–1	Ponte Preta	São Paulo
16:00 (UTC-3)	Kaká 9'; Reinaldo 17', 19'; Gabriel 87'	(Report) (pt)	Alex Oliveira 65'	Stadium: Morumbi; Referee: Edílson Pereira de Carvalho

3 March Round 8	São Paulo	4–1	América-RJ	São Paulo
16:00 (UTC-3)	França 18', 75'; Emerson 52'; Kaká 89'	(Report) (pt)	Gil Bala 76'	Stadium: Morumbi; Referee: Cléver Assunção Gonçalves

10 March Round 9	Portuguesa	0–4	São Paulo	São Paulo
16:00 (UTC-3)		(Report) (pt)	França 18', 38'; Reinaldo 58'; Kaká 63'	Stadium: Morumbi; Referee: Romildo Corrêa

17 March Round 10	São Paulo	7–0	Bangu	São Paulo
16:00 (UTC-3)	França 1', 10', 31' (pen.), 54'; Kaká 16'; Belletti 51', 64'	(Report) (pt)		Stadium: Morumbi; Attendance: 14,565; Referee: Fernando Oliveira Assunção

20 March Round 11	São Paulo	2–4	Palmeiras	São Paulo
21:00 (UTC-3)	França 30'; Kaká 71'	(Report) (pt)	Magrão 11'; Claudecir 18'; Alex 27'; Arce 90+3'	Stadium: Morumbi; Referee: Luiz Marcelo Cansian

24 March Round 12	São Caetano	1–0	São Paulo	São Caetano do Sul
16:00 (UTC-3)	Wágner 58'	(Report) (pt)		Stadium: Anacleto Campanella; Referee: Sálvio Spínola Fagundes Filho

31 March Round 13	Corinthians	3–1	São Paulo	Presidente Prudente
16:00 (UTC-3)	Rogério 24'; Renato 74', 84'	(Report) (pt)	Reinaldo 55'	Stadium: Prudentão; Referee: Paulo César de Oliveira

7 April Round 14	Santos	3–2	São Paulo	Santos
16:00 (UTC-3)	Marcelo Silva 6'; Michel 37'; Preto 90+1'	(Report) (pt)	Reginaldo 58'; França 70'	Stadium: Vila Belmiro; Referee: Romildo Correa

14 April Round 15	São Paulo	5–3	Americano	São Paulo
16:00 (UTC-3)	Souza 7'; França 36', 52', 90'; Jean 62'	(Report) (pt)	Rondinelli 51', 57'; Luciano Viana 63'	Stadium: Morumbi; Referee: Leonardo Gaciba da Silva

21 April Semifinals	São Paulo	1–1	Palmeiras	São Paulo
16:00 (UTC-3)	Adriano 75'	(Report) (pt)	Muñoz 54'	Stadium: Morumbi; Referee: Paulo César Oliveira

27 April Semifinals	Palmeiras	2–2	São Paulo	São Paulo
16:00 (UTC-3)	Christian 23'; Magrão 26'	(Report) (pt)	Rogério Ceni 5'; Gustavo Nery 81'	Stadium: Morumbi; Referee: Carlos Eugênio Simon

5 May Finals	São Paulo	2–3	Corinthians	São Paulo
16:00 (UTC-3)	Adriano 16'; Belletti 69'	(Report) (pt)	Deivid 47'; Leandro 53'; Gil 65'	Stadium: Morumbi; Attendance: 34,514; Referee: Edílson Pereira de Carvalho

12 May Finals	Corinthians	1–1	São Paulo	São Paulo
16:00 (UTC-3)	Rogério 77'	(Report) (pt)	Reinaldo 2'	Stadium: Morumbi; Attendance: 53,414; Referee: Paulo César de Oliveira

==== Record ====
Final Position	Points	Matches	Wins	Draws	Losses	Goals For	Goals Away	Win%
2nd	29	19	8	5	6	53	38	51%

=== Copa do Brasil ===
14 February Round of 64	Treze	1–0	São Paulo	Campina Grande
20:30 (UTC-3)	Capitão 47'	(Report) (pt)		Stadium: Amigão; Referee: Antônio Cipriano de Almeida

21 February Round of 64	São Paulo	4–1	Treze	São Paulo
20:30 (UTC-3)	Kaká 27', 80'; Reinaldo 48', 65'	(Report) (pt)	Almir Conceição 2'	Stadium: Morumbi; Attendance: 5,105; Referee: Wallace Valente

27 February Round of 32	Flamengo-PI	0–5	São Paulo	Teresina
21:45 (UTC-3)		(Report) (pt)	França 9', 88', 90+10'; Reinaldo 40'; Kaká 86'	Stadium: Albertão; Attendance: 22,400; Referee: Marcos Antonio Sampaio

28 March Round of 16	Figueirense	3–1	São Paulo	Florianópolis
21:45 (UTC-3)	Juninho 18'; Doriva 79'; Mabília 90+4'	(Report) (pt)	Kaka 72'	Stadium: Orlando Scarpelli; Referee: Elvécio Zequeto

3 April Round of 16	São Paulo	6–1	Figueirense	São Paulo
21:45 (UTC-3)	Reinaldo 15', 60'; França 43', 54'; Jean 52'; Rogério Ceni 79'	(Report) (pt)	Marcelinho 31'	Stadium: Morumbi; Referee: Edílson Soares da Silva

10 April Quarterfinals	Vasco da Gama	1–0	São Paulo	Rio de Janeiro
21:45 (UTC-3)	Romário 60'	(Report) (pt)		Stadium: São Januário; Referee: Luciano de Almeida

17 April Quarterfinals	São Paulo	4–0	Vasco da Gama	São Paulo
21:45 (UTC-3)	Souza 11'; Kaká 45'; Belletti 54'; Reinaldo 60'	(Report) (pt)		Stadium: Morumbi; Referee: Carlos Eugênio Simon

24 April Semifinals	São Paulo	0–2	Corinthians	São Paulo
21:45 (UTC-3)		(Report) (pt)	Deivid 2', 90'	Stadium: Morumbi; Attendance: 22,822; Referee: Edílson Pereira de Carvalho

1 May Semifinals	Corinthians	1–2	São Paulo	São Paulo
21:45 (UTC-3)	Deivid 61'	(Report) (pt)	Reinaldo 48'; Kaká 64'	Stadium: Morumbi; Attendance: 36,007; Referee: Wilson de Souza Mendonça

==== Record ====
Final Position	Points	Matches	Wins	Draws	Losses	Goals For	Goals Away	Win%
3rd	15	9	5	0	4	21	10	55%

=== Supercampeonato Paulista ===
19 May Semifinals	São Paulo	2–0	Palmeiras	São Caetano do Sul
16:00 (UTC-3)	Reinaldo 85'; Júlio Baptista 90+3'	(Report) (pt)		Stadium: Anacleto Campanella; Referee: Romildo Corrêa

22 May Semifinals	Palmeiras	2–2	São Paulo	São Paulo
21:00 (UTC-3)	Itamar 63'; Nenê 85'	(Report) (pt)	Fábio Simplício 46'; Sandro Hiroshi 77'	Stadium: Canindé; Referee: Sálvio Espínola Fagundes Filho

26 May Finals	Ituano	2–2	São Paulo	Itu
16:00 (UTC-3)	Fernando Gaúcho 39'; Basílio 77'	(Report) (pt)	Reinaldo 68'; Júlio Baptista 89'	Stadium: Novelli Júnior; Referee: Edílson Pereira de Carvalho

30 May Finals	São Paulo	4–1	Ituano	São Paulo
16:00 (UTC-3)	Adriano 18', 43'; Reinaldo 66'; Sandro Hiroshi 69'	(Report) (pt)	Basílio 76'	Stadium: Morumbi; Referee: Paulo César de Oliveira

==== Record ====
Final Position	Points	Matches	Wins	Draws	Losses	Goals For	Goals Away	Win%
1st	8	4	2	2	0	10	5	66%

=== Copa do Campeões ===
3 July Group C	Vitória	2–0	São Paulo	Natal
19:15 (UTC-3)	Aristizábal 59'; Maurício 90+1'	(Report) (pt)		Stadium: Machadão; Referee: Wagner Tardelli

7 July Group C	São Paulo	1–1	Cruzeiro	Natal
16:00 (UTC-3)	Luís Fabiano 36' (pen.)	(Report) (pt)	Ricardinho 45+1'	Stadium: Machadão; Referee: Héber Roberto Lopes

13 July Group C	Grêmio	0–2	São Paulo	Natal
18:15 (UTC-3)		(Report) (pt)	Luís Fabiano 49'; Sandro Hiroshi 90+3'	Stadium: Machadão; Referee: Wagner Tardeli Azevedo

==== Record ====
Final Position	Points	Matches	Wins	Draws	Losses	Goals For	Goals Away	Win%
9th	4	3	1	1	1	3	3	44%

=== Campeonato Brasileiro ===
10 August Round 1	São Paulo	4–2	Paysandu	São Paulo
16:00 (UTC-3)	Jean 15'; Jorginho Paulista 30'; Luís Fabiano 60', 88'	(Report) (pt)	Jóbson 27', 68'	Stadium: Morumbi; Attendance: 15,325; Referee: Alício Pena Júnior

15 August Round 2	Gama	0–1	São Paulo	Taguatinga
20:30 (UTC-3)		(Report) (pt)	Júlio Santos 81'	Stadium: Serejão; Referee: Wagner Tardeli

18 August Round 3	Paraná	2–3	São Paulo	Curitiba
16:00 (UTC-3)	Maurílio 73'; Émerson 88'	(Report) (pt)	Kaká 18'; Júlio Baptista 32'; Reinaldo 54'	Stadium: Couto Pereira; Attendance: 7,929; Referee: Leonardo Gaciba da Silva

21 August Round 4	São Paulo	0–1	Juventude	São Paulo
20:30 (UTC-3)		(Report) (pt)	Élder 3'	Stadium: Morumbi; Attendance: 6,318; Referee: Wilson de Souza Mendonça

24 August Round 5	Internacional	2–2	São Paulo	Porto Alegre
16:00 (UTC-3)	Fabiano 47'; Cleiton Xavier 90+5'	(Report) (pt)	Reinaldo 35', 63'	Stadium: Beira-Rio; Attendance: 9,866; Referee: Edilson Soares da Silva

29 August Round 6	São Paulo	2–0	Goiás	São Paulo
20:30 (UTC-3)	Luís Fabiano 47', 88'	(Report) (pt)		Stadium: Morumbi; Attendance: 5,005; Referee: Jamir Carlos Garcez

1 September Round 7	São Paulo	2–0	Grêmio	São Paulo
16:00 (UTC-3)	Fábio Simplício 32'; Kaká 34'	(Report) (pt)		Stadium: Morumbi; Attendance: 46,327; Referee: Márcio Rezende de Freitas

4 September Round 8	Cruzeiro	3–1	São Paulo	Belo Horizonte
20:30 (UTC-3)	Marcelo Ramos 24'; Luisão 48'; Fábio Júnior 85'	(Report) (pt)	Luís Fabiano 72'	Stadium: Independência; Attendance: 16,271; Referee: Antônio Pereira da Silva

7 September Round 9	São Caetano	3–0	São Paulo	São Caetano do Sul
16:00 (UTC-3)	Magrão 37'; Marco Aurélio 55'; Claudecir 90+3'	(Report) (pt)		Stadium: Anacleto Campanella; Referee: Romildo Correa

15 September Round 10	São Paulo	6–0	Fluminense	São Paulo
16:00 (UTC-3)	Júlio Baptista 17'; Kaká 57'; Régis 70'; Leandro Amaral 82'; Luís Fabiano 86', 90'	(Report) (pt)		Stadium: Morumbi; Attendance: 20,704; Referee: Wilson de Souza Mendonça

18 September Round 11	Bahia	2–0	São Paulo	Salvador
20:30 (UTC-3)	Geraldo 74'; Bebeto Campos 90+1'	(Report) (pt)		Stadium: Fonte Nova; Attendance: 35,494; Referee: Giuliano Bozzano

22 September Round 12	Atlético Paranaense	1–1	São Paulo	Curitiba
16:00 (UTC-3)	Dagoberto 29'	(Report) (pt)	Ricardinho 43'	Stadium: Arena da Baixada; Attendance: 28,146; Referee: Antônio Pereira da Silva

25 September Round 13	São Paulo	1–2	Atlético Mineiro	São Paulo
20:30 (UTC-3)	Júlio Baptista 87'	(Report) (pt)	Mancini 13'; Paulinho 84'	Stadium: Morumbi; Attendance: 9,231; Referee: Leonardo Gaciba da Silva

29 September Round 14	São Paulo	2–2	Corinthians	São Paulo
16:00 (UTC-3)	Reinaldo 72', 80'	(Report) (pt)	Gil 12', 90'	Stadium: Morumbi; Attendance: 49,231; Referee: Paulo César de Oliveira

2 October Round 15	Palmeiras	1–1	São Paulo	São Paulo
20:30 (UTC-3)	Muñoz 38'	(Report) (pt)	Luís Fabiano 41'	Stadium: Pacaembu; Referee: Romildo Correia

5 October Round 16	Flamengo	2–3	São Paulo	Rio de Janeiro
16:00 (UTC-3)	Liédson 59', 89'	(Report) (pt)	Reinaldo 25', 57'; Kaká 81'	Stadium: Maracanã; Referee: Sérgio da Silva Carvalho

8 October Round 17	São Paulo	3–1	Coritiba	São Paulo
20:30 (UTC-3)	Reinaldo 5', 67'; Jorginho Paulista 81'	(Report) (pt)	Williams 88'	Stadium: Morumbi; Attendance: 11,996; Referee: Wagner Tardeli Azevedo

12 October Round 18	Figueirense	0–3	São Paulo	Florianópolis
16:00 (UTC-3)		(Report) (pt)	Kaká 33', 76'; Luís Fabiano 86'	Stadium: Orlando Scarpelli; Referee: Carlos Eugênio Simon

16 October Round 19	São Paulo	3–2	Santos	São Paulo
20:30 (UTC-3)	Luís Fabiano 57'; Reinaldo 59'; Ricardinho 89'	(Report) (pt)	Robert 71'; Diego 83'	Stadium: Morumbi; Attendance: 54,090; Referee: Cléber Wellington Abade

20 October Round 20	Guarani	1–2	São Paulo	Campinas
16:00 (UTC-3)	Martinez 41'	(Report) (pt)	Ricardinho 25'; Luís Fabiano 39'	Stadium: Brinco de Ouro; Referee: Luís Marcelo Cansian

26 October Round 21	Portuguesa	1–3	São Paulo	São Paulo
16:00 (UTC-3)	Luiz Henrique 42'	(Report) (pt)	Rogério Ceni 30'; Luís Fabiano 63', 73'	Stadium: Canindé; Referee: Edílson Pereira de Carvalho

31 October Round 22	São Paulo	5–2	Ponte Preta	São Paulo
20:30 (UTC-3)	Ameli 11'; Luís Fabiano 18', 35'; Reinaldo 43'; Kaká 88'	(Report) (pt)	Caíco 6'; Alex Oliveira 81'	Stadium: Morumbi; Attendance: 13,289; Referee: Anselmo da Costa

6 November Round 23	São Paulo	5–3	Vasco da Gama	São Paulo
21:40 (UTC-3)	Luís Fabiano 45', 68', 74'; Jean 61'; Júlio Santos 75'	(Report) (pt)	Ramon 32', 35'; Zé Carlos 67'	Stadium: Morumbi; Attendance: 15,506; Referee: Wilson de Souza Mendonça

14 November Round 24	São Paulo	3–2	Vitória	São Paulo
20:30 (UTC-3)	Kaká 24'; Leandro Amaral 29'; Reinaldo 54'	(Report) (pt)	Zé Roberto 7'; Leílton 13'	Stadium: Morumbi; Referee: Márcio Rezende de Freitas

17 November Round 25	Botafogo	0–1	São Paulo	Niterói
16:00 (UTC-3)		(Report) (pt)	Dill 55'	Stadium: Caio Martins; Referee: Luciano Augusto Almeida

24 November Quarterfinals	Santos	3–1	São Paulo	Santos
16:00 (UTC-3)	Alberto 30'; Robinho 51'; Diego 66'	(Report) (pt)	Kaká 45+1'	Stadium: Vila Belmiro; Attendance: 18,617; Referee: Carlos Eugênio Simon

28 November Quarterfinals	São Paulo	1–2	Santos	São Paulo
20:30 (UTC-3)	Luís Fabiano 4'	(Report) (pt)	Léo 59'; Robinho 90+2'	Stadium: Morumbi; Attendance: 64,946; Referee: Wilson de Souza Mendonça

==== Record ====
Final Position	Points	Matches	Wins	Draws	Losses	Goals For	Goals Away	Win%
5th	52	27	16	4	7	59	40	64%
