= Lugano (disambiguation) =

Lugano is a city in Switzerland.

Lugano may also refer to:

== People ==
- Bobby Lugano (1917-1994), Austrian magician
- Charles Lugano (1950–2009), Kenyan politician
- Diego Lugano (born 1980), Uruguayan footballer
- Nicolás Lugano (born 2000), Uruguayan footballer
- Paolo Lugano (1912-1937), Italian military figure
- Thiago Lugano (born 2006), Uruguayan footballer

== Places ==
- Canton of Lugano, a canton of the Helvetic Republic from 1798 to 1803, with its capital at Lugano
- Lake Lugano, a glacial lake in the south-east of Switzerland
- Lugano District, a district of Canton Ticino, Switzerland
- Mount Lugano, a mountain in Greenland
- Villa Lugano, a neighbourhood in Buenos Aires, Argentina
- Lugarno, a suburb in southern Sydney, Australia

== Religion ==
- Lugano Cathedral, a Roman Catholic church in Lugano, Switzerland
- Roman Catholic Diocese of Lugano, in Switzerland

== Sports ==
- BSI Challenger Lugano, a professional tennis tournament played on outdoor red clay courts
- Club Atlético Lugano, an Argentine football club, from Tapiales neighborhood in La Matanza Partido, Buenos Aires Province
- FC Lugano, a Swiss football club based in Lugano
- Gran Premio di Lugano, a road bicycle race held annually in Lugano, Switzerland
- HC Lugano, a professional ice hockey club based in Lugano
- Lugano Tigers, a Swiss professional basketball club that is based in Lugano

== Transport ==
- Lugano Airport, on west of Lugano, Switzerland
- Lugano railway station, a station owned and operated by the Swiss Federal Railways, in the city of Lugano

== Other ==
- 1936 Lugano, asteroid
- University of Lugano, a public university located in Lugano, Switzerland

== See also ==
- Lucano (disambiguation)
