= Fabiano Lima =

Fabiano Lima may refer to:

- Fabiano de Lima Campos Maria, Brazilian footballer
- Fabiano Lima Rodrigues, Brazilian footballer
