= Diego Lugano =

Uruguayan footballer (born 1980)

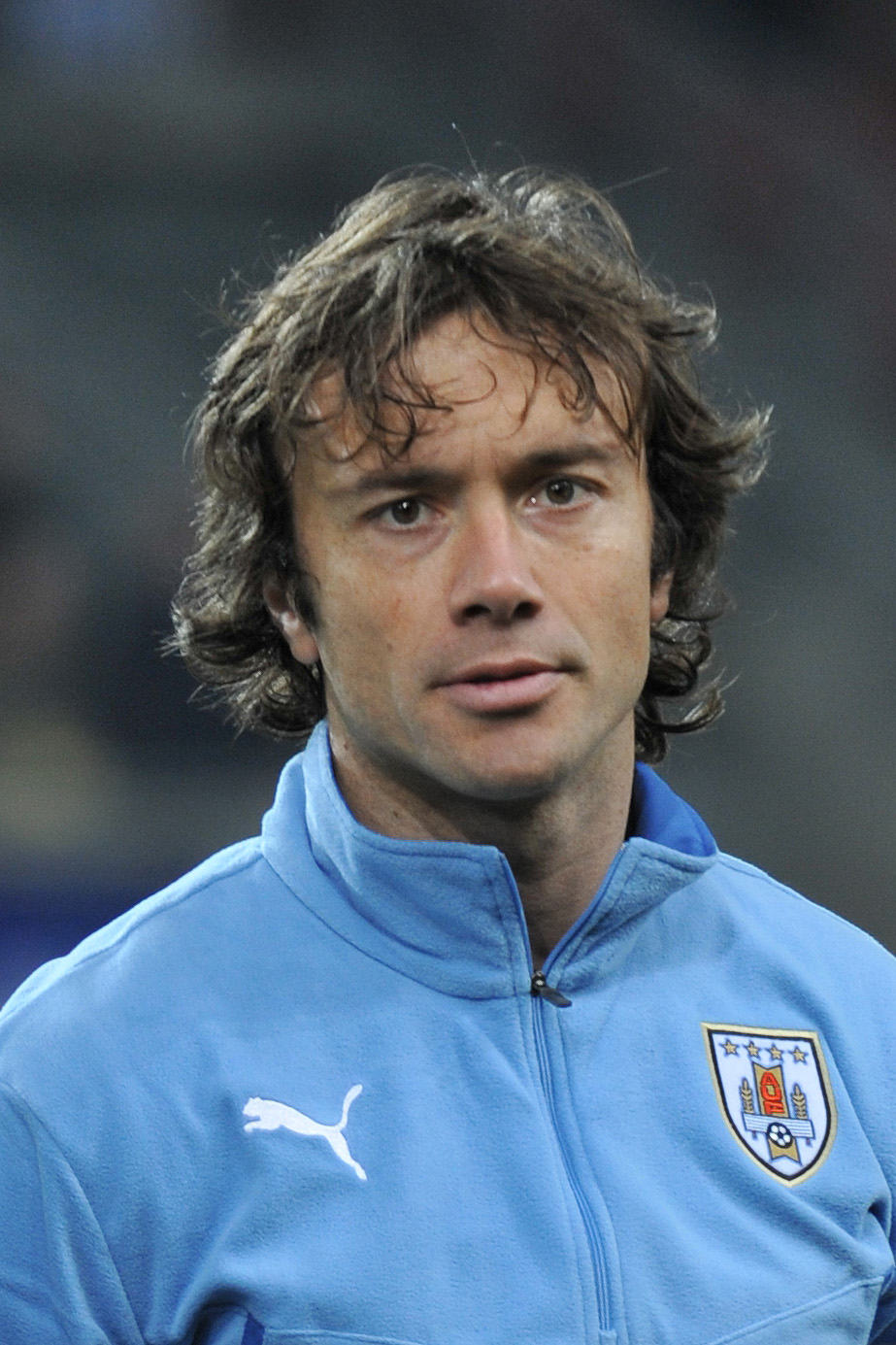
- Lugano with Uruguay in 2014

Personal information
- Full name: Diego Alfredo Lugano Morena
- Date of birth: 2 November 1980 (age 46)
- Place of birth: Canelones, Uruguay
- Height: 1.88 m (6 ft 2 in)
- Position: Centre back

Youth career
- 1996–1999: Nacional

Senior career*
Years	Team	Apps	(Gls)
1999–2003	Nacional	13	(0)
2001–2002	→ Plaza Colonia (loan)	46	(4)
2003–2006	São Paulo	95	(7)
2006–2011	Fenerbahçe	125	(21)
2011–2013	Paris Saint-Germain	12	(0)
2013	→ Málaga (loan)	11	(0)
2013–2014	West Bromwich Albion	9	(1)
2015	BK Häcken	11	(0)
2015	Cerro Porteño	16	(5)
2016–2017	São Paulo	18	(2)
Total		356	(40)

International career
2003–2014	Uruguay	95	(9)
Medal record
Representing Uruguay
Copa América
Winner	2011 Argentina	Team
- * Club domestic league appearances and goals

Diego Alfredo Lugano Morena (Spanish pronunciation: [ˈdjeɣo luˈɣano]; born 2 November 1980) is a Uruguayan former professional footballer who played as a central defender.

Nicknamed Tota, Lugano played for a number of clubs in South America and Europe, including Plaza Colonia, Club Nacional de Football, São Paulo, Fenerbahçe, Paris Saint-Germain, Malaga and West Bromwich Albion, before finishing his career with a second spell at Brazilian club São Paulo, where he now works as an administrator.

Throughout his career, Lugano netted goals in the football leagues of Uruguay, Brazil, Turkey, England, France and Paraguay.

In 2015, Paraguayan newspaper ExtraPRESS named Lugano one of the most expensive player in Uruguay , and he was also awarded by Diario Popular as the most popular player in Paraguayan football.

Lugano made 95 appearances for the Uruguay national team, captaining his country at two FIFA World Cups. He was named best captain at the 2010 tournament.

== Club career ==
=== Early years ===
Born to Alfredo Lugano and Diana Morena in Canelones, Canelones Department, Lugano started playing football for his hometown club Club Atlético Libertad, like his father Alfredo. In December 1998, he played his first match with the first-team squad of Libertad, becoming league champions with the club at the age of 18 years. From Libertad, in 1999, Lugano transferred to Club Nacional de Football in Montevideo. Three years later, Lugano was loaned out to Plaza Colonia for the duration of the playing season.

=== São Paulo ===
Lugano came to São Paulo FC in 2003. He was contracted by club president Marcelo Portugal Gouveia without consulting the head coach Oswaldo de Oliveira. President Gouveia's actions led to the ascribing of the nickname "Homem do Presidente" ("President's Man") to Lugano. After Oswaldo de Oliveira left the club in late 2003, Lugano started playing matches more frequently. In 2005, he led the team to titles in the Campeonato Paulista, the Copa Libertadores, and the FIFA Club World Championship in Japan. That same year, Lugano was recognized as South America's best defender. His leadership skills and his willingness to fight for ball possession have raised his profile amongst São Paulo's supporters, where he is still highly regarded. Lugano has also mentioned that he still maintains a good relationship with the club. In 2006, he helped his club to the runner-up stage of the Copa Libertadores.

=== Fenerbahçe ===
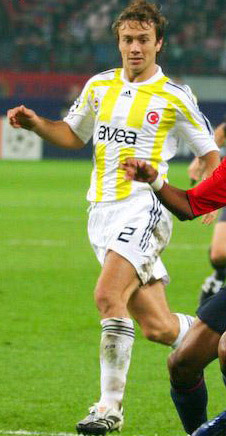
Lugano playing for Fenerbahçe

Lugano joined Fenerbahçe on 21 August 2006 for a reported transfer fee of €7.5 million, where he signed a 3 1/2-year contract with the Turkish club. He and Edu Dracena's powerful defensive abilities helped Fenerbahçe win the league during the club's 100th anniversary year.

Lugano is notorious for his presence in attack, as was shown with his scored goals from headers from dead ball situations and support of the forward line. He became a fan favourite with his defensive tenacity and his spectacular play from free kick situations. Following a red card, he was suspended for five weeks after the derby match against Galatasaray during the 2008–09 season when he clashed with Emre Aşık on 12 April 2009 at Ali Sami Yen Stadium. Since then, he has a strong connection with supporters, especially with the Genç Fenerbahçeliler. He was one of the captains of the team. He signed a new four-year contract in 2009 with Fenerbahçe.

=== Paris Saint-Germain ===
On 27 August 2011, Fenerbahçe announced Lugano was leaving the club to join Paris Saint-Germain in the French Ligue 1 for a fee worth €3 million. His first season in France, however, ended poorly and Lugano made just 12 appearances, mostly being cut out of the side due to injury and poor form.

=== Málaga ===
On 21 January 2013, Lugano signed with Spanish side Málaga CF until 30 June on loan. As he was not in PSG manager Carlo Ancelotti's plans, Lugano was not registered in the Champions League for that season; this way, he was not cup tied for his new club and represented Málaga in their European ambitions. He returned to PSG on 1 July 2013, with Málaga failing to make the loan move permanent.

=== West Bromwich Albion ===
On 2 August 2013, Lugano joined Premier League club West Bromwich Albion on a two-year contract. He scored his first goal for West Brom on 20 January 2014, heading in an equalizer in a 1–1 home draw with Everton.

On 17 May 2014, West Bromwich announced the release of five players of their squad, including Lugano.

=== BK Häcken ===
On 26 March 2015, Lugano signed for Swedish side BK Häcken on a short-term contract until the summer. Lugano became one of the most merited players ever to play in the Swedish top league.

=== Cerro Porteño ===
On 7 July 2015, La Nación reported that Primera División Paraguaya team Cerro Porteño had assured the signing of Lugano. On 12 July, Lugano's transfer was officially made. Upon arriving to Paraguay, Lugano was received at the airport by Cerro Porteño managers and fans, and was presented as a Cerro Porteño footballer. He signed a 1-year contract. At the presentation, Lugano pointed "I arrived at Cerro for the need of returning to South America and to be closer to my country. The proposal from Cerro closed everything I wanted, it's a big club, it will demand me and oblige me to return to my level". He was then received by his teammates and began training with the first roster. Lugano revealed that since arriving at Cerro Porteño, he received better offers, but decided to stay.

In August 2015, Lugano debuted for Cerro Porteño in a 4–0 victory against General Díaz, scoring the first goal of the game in the first half, scoring with a header. This was his first league goal since January 2014 for West Bromwich Albion.

On 13 September 2015, Lugano scored a second half double in a 3–1 home victory against Sol de America. His goals occurred in the 69th, from a header. and 75th minutes. By that moment, Lugano had scored 3 goals in 5 Primera División Paraguaya appearances being a defender.

On 20 September, he scored in a 2–1 home victory against Deportivo Santani, scoring in the 19th minute of the first half.

On 7 November, he scored a 90 + 8th-minute penalty in a 3–1 home defeat against Libertad.

On 9 December 2015, he made his last appearance of the year in a 2–1 defeat against Olimpia Asunción, scoring an own goal in the 63rd minute.

In December 2015, Lugano was awarded by Diario Popular as the most popular player in Paraguayan football.

In January 2016, the club president informed that Lugano was still a Cerro Porteño player and that would speak with him personally if he wanted to leave. Lugano had discarded his trip with the team to Encarnación for the pre-season preparation for the Torneo Apertura. On 5 January 2016, Lugano reached an agreement with Cerro Porteño to leave the club and was available to negotiate a return to Brazilian team São Paulo, who were interested in his services. The termination of the contract came after an interview between Lugano and Juan José Zapag, Cerro Porteño's president. Following Lugano's departure, the club's directives and fans were bothered. Upon his departure from the club, Lugano left a message of gratitude to Cerro Porteño through his social media channel of Facebook.

Lugano totalled 5 goals, 10 yellow cards and 1 expulsion in 16 games for Cerro Porteño, amassing 1, 438 minutes.

=== Return to São Paulo ===
In January 2016, after almost 10 years, Lugano returned to São Paulo FC, in Brazil, where he won 2005 Copa Libertadores and 2005 FIFA Club World Championship, he instantly became São Paulo's idol. On 12 January 2016, he was welcomed at the Guarulhos Airport by nearly 1000 fans of Tricolor paulista.

In January 2018, Lugano accepted the role of director of institutional relations at São Paulo, confirming his retirement as a player.

== International career ==
Lugano made 95 appearances for the Uruguay national football team after making his debut in the 2006 FIFA World Cup qualification match against Paraguay. He has represented the country at two FIFA World Cups, two Copa América tournaments and one FIFA Confederations Cup. He captained the team for eight years, beginning in May 2006, when he was given the armband of La Celeste for the first time prior to a 2–1 friendly defeat to England at Old Trafford.

During the 2010 FIFA World Cup qualification campaign, Lugano scored his first international goal in a 1–1 draw with Venezuela at Montevideo's Estadio Centenario. He went on to score three further goals during qualification, including the only goal of a 1–0 win in San José against Costa Rica in the inter-continental play-off.

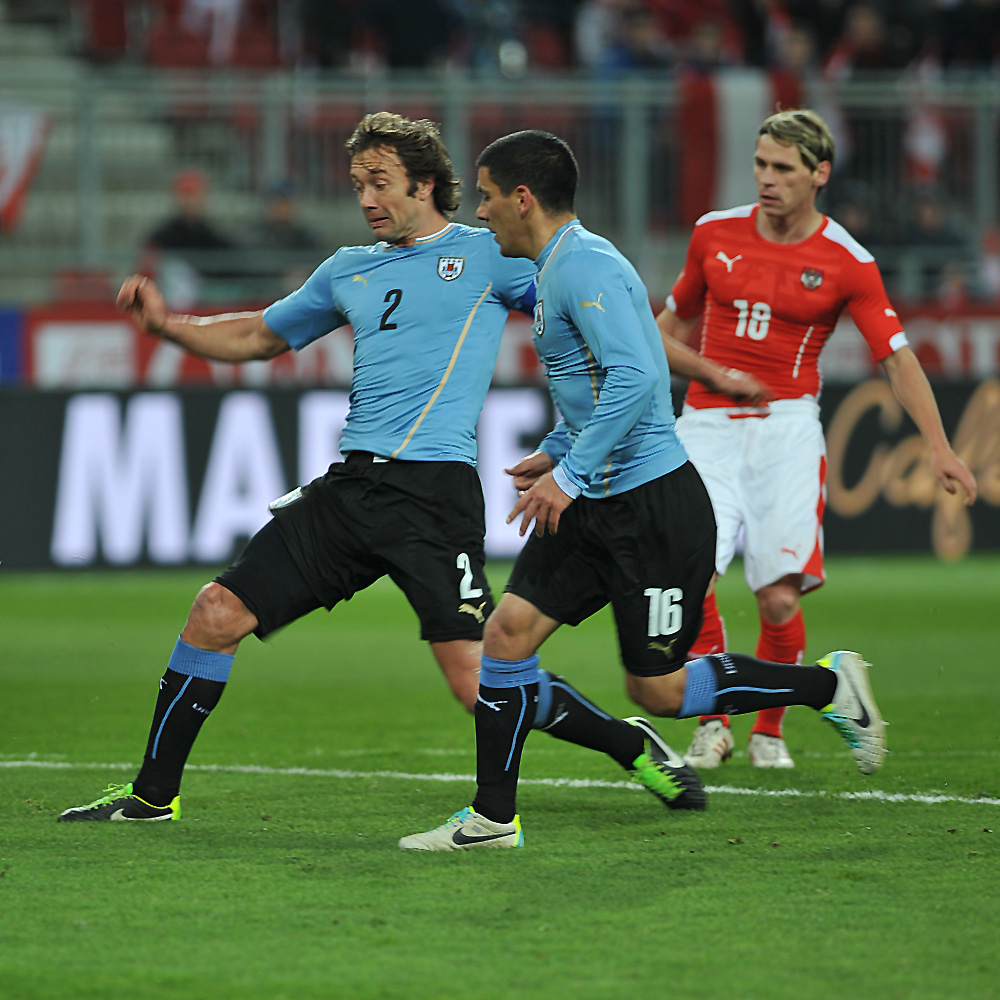
Lugano in action against Austria in 2014

Lugano was a first choice player for Uruguay at the 2007 Copa América, captaining the team in each of its six matches. In the team's semi-final against Brazil, Lugano had his decisive kick in the penalty shootout saved by Doni. Lugano was sent off in the 3–1 third-place play-off defeat to Mexico at the Estadio Olímpico in Caracas.

At the 2010 FIFA World Cup, Lugano led Uruguay to an impressive fourth-placed finish. Lugano also captained Uruguay to victory at the 2011 Copa América, playing in all six games for the eventual champions. On 2 September 2011, Lugano scored a goal as Uruguay defeated Ukraine 3–2 in an international friendly away in Kharkiv. In his next call up to the national side, on 7 October 2011, Lugano netted a brace in Uruguay's 4–2 defeat of Bolivia in World Cup qualifying.

On 20 June 2013, Lugano scored his ninth goal for Uruguay against Nigeria in a 2–1 win at the 2013 FIFA Confederations Cup in Brazil, where the nation eventually finished in fourth place. He also participated in the 2014 FIFA World Cup, playing in his first and only game of the tournament as the captain against Costa Rica on 14 June 2014, where Uruguay lost 1–3. A knee injury saw Lugano miss the remainder of Uruguay's World Cup matches, with 19-year-old José Giménez replacing him as Diego Godín's partner in defence.

Lugano was omitted from Óscar Tabárez's first post-World Cup squad for friendly matches against Japan and South Korea in September 2014. Later, the 34-year-old stated that he had not retired from the national team and would be available for selection if required. However, he was not named in Uruguay's squad for the 2015 Copa América.

== Personal life ==
Lugano is married to Karina Roncio and has three children: Nicolás, Thiago, and Bianca. During the 2000s, Nicolás played for Fenerbahçe youth teams. Nicolás now played for the U-19 Defensor squad. Thiago and Bianca were born in Istanbul. He has cited the defenders Hugo de León and Paolo Montero as his personal football heroes. A sports complex in the Uruguayan city Canelones, the Complejo Diego Lugano, is named after him, and serves Club Social y Deportivo SAC de Canelones. In 2015, Lugano gained international wide media attention when his wife and he travelled on a bus in Asunción after having a problem with his vehicle.

Lugano is of Piedmontese descent and holds the Italian passport.

== Career statistics ==
=== Club ===
Appearances and goals by club, season and competition
Club	Season	League			State league (Note: Includes Campeonato Paulista)		National cup (Note: Includes Turkish Cup, Coupe de France, FA Cup, Copa do Brasil)		League cup (Note: Includes Coupe de la Ligue, Football League Cup)		Continental		Other		Total	
Club	Season	Division	Apps	Goals	Apps	Goals	Apps	Goals	Apps	Goals	Apps	Goals	Apps	Goals	Apps	Goals
São Paulo	2003	Série A	23	1	1	0	–		–		6 (Note: Appearances in Copa Sudamericana)	1	1	0	31	2
São Paulo	2004	Série A	34	1	6	0	–		–		8 (Note: Four appearances in Copa Libertadores, four appearances in Copa Sudamericana)	0	1	0	49	1
São Paulo	2005	Série A	27	5	14	1	–		–		13 (Note: Appearances in Copa Libertadores)	1	7 (Note: Two appearances in FIFA Club World Cup)	0	65	7
São Paulo	2006	Série A	11	0	9	0	–		–		12	0	1	0	33	0
São Paulo	Total		95	7	30	1	–		–		43	2	10	0	178	10
Fenerbahçe	2006–07	Süper Lig	24	4	–		5	0	–		7 (Note: Appearances in UEFA Cup)	1	–		36	5
Fenerbahçe	2007–08	Süper Lig	23	0	–		3	0	–		11 (Note: Appearances in UEFA Champions League)	1	0	0	37	1
Fenerbahçe	2008–09	Süper Lig	25	7	–		7	0	–		9	0	–		41	7
Fenerbahçe	2009–10	Süper Lig	25	3	–		8	1	–		9 (Note: Appearances in UEFA Europa League)	1	0	0	42	5
Fenerbahçe	2010–11	Süper Lig	28	7	–		2	2	–		2	0	–		32	9
Fenerbahçe	Total		125	21	–		25	3	–		38	3	0	0	198	27
Paris Saint-Germain	2011–12	Ligue 1	12	0	–		3	1	1	0	5	0	–		21	1
Paris Saint-Germain	2012–13	Ligue 1	0	0	–		0	0	0	0	0	0	–		0	0
Paris Saint-Germain	Total		12	0	–		3	1	1	0	5	0	–		21	1
Málaga(loan)	2012–13	La Liga	11	0	–		0	0	–		–		–		11	0
West Bromwich Albion	2013–14	Premier League	9	1	–		1	0	2	0	–		–		12	1
BK Häcken	2015	Allsvenskan	11	0	–		0	0	–		–		–		11	0
Cerro Porteño	2015	Primera División	16	5	–		–		–		–		–		16	5
São Paulo	2016	Série A	13	2	0	0	1	0	–		4	0	7	0	25	2
São Paulo	2017	Série A	5	0	0	0	1	0	–		0	0	5	0	11	0
São Paulo	Total		18	2	0	0	2	0	–		4	0	12	0	36	2
Career total			288	36	30	1	31	4	3	0	90	5	22	0	464	46

=== International ===
Appearances and goals by national team and year
National team	Year	Apps	Goals
Uruguay	2003	1	0
Uruguay	2004	1	0
Uruguay	2005	7	0
Uruguay	2006	2	0
Uruguay	2007	11	0
Uruguay	2008	9	2
Uruguay	2009	10	2
Uruguay	2010	11	0
Uruguay	2011	16	4
Uruguay	2012	8	0
Uruguay	2013	15	1
Uruguay	2014	4	0
Total		95	9

Scores and results list Uruguay's goal tally first, score column indicates score after each Lugano goal.

List of international goals scored by Diego Lugano
No.	Date	Venue	Opponent	Score	Result	Competition
1	14 June 2008	Estadio Centenario, Montevideo, Uruguay	Venezuela	1–0	1–1	2010 FIFA World Cup qualification
2	11 October 2008	Estadio Monumental Antonio Vespucio Liberti, Buenos Aires, Argentina	Argentina	1–2	1–2	2010 FIFA World Cup qualification
3	28 March 2009	Estadio Centenario, Montevideo, Uruguay	Paraguay	2–0	2–0	2010 FIFA World Cup qualification
4	15 November 2009	Estadio Ricardo Saprissa Aymá, San José, Costa Rica	Costa Rica	1–0	1–0	2010 FIFA World Cup qualification play-off
5	29 March 2011	Aviva Stadium, Dublin, Republic of Ireland	Republic of Ireland	1–0	3–2	Friendly
6	2 September 2011	Metalist Oblast Sports Complex, Kharkiv, Ukraine	Ukraine	2–2	3–2	Friendly
7	7 October 2011	Estadio Centenario, Montevideo, Uruguay	Bolivia	2–1	4–2	2014 FIFA World Cup qualification
8	7 October 2011	Estadio Centenario, Montevideo, Uruguay	Bolivia	4–1	4–2	2014 FIFA World Cup qualification
9	20 June 2013	Itaipava Arena Fonte Nova, Salvador, Brazil	Nigeria	1–0	2–1	2013 FIFA Confederations Cup

== Honours ==
Nacional

- Uruguayan Primera División: 2000, 2001

São Paulo

- Série A: 2006
- Campeonato Paulista: 2005
- Copa Libertadores: 2005
- FIFA Club World Cup: 2005

Fenerbahçe

- Süper Lig: 2006–07, 2010–11
- Turkish Super Cup: 2007, 2009

Uruguay

- Copa América: 2011

Individual

- Campeonato Brasileiro Série A Team of the Year: 2005
