= Hugo Sosa =

Paraguayan footballer (born 1970)

Personal information
- Full name: Hugo Ranulfo Sosa Franco
- Date of birth: 26 November 1970 (age 55)
- Place of birth: Luque, Paraguay
- Height: 1.83 m (6 ft 0 in)
- Position: Forward

Team information
- Current team: Guabirá (youth manager)

Senior career*
Years	Team	Apps	(Gls)
1992	Sportivo Luqueño		
1993	Emelec		
1994	América de Cali		
1999	Sportivo Luqueño		
2003	Independiente Petrolero		
2004	Club San José		
2005	The Strongest		
2006	Unión Central		

International career
1992	Paraguay U23		
1996–1999	Paraguay	3	(0)

Managerial career
- 2016–: Guabirá (youth)
- * Club domestic league appearances and goals

Hugo Ranulfo Sosa (born 26 November 1970 in Luque) is a Paraguayan football manager and former player who played as a forward. He is the current manager of Bolivian side Guabirá's youth categories.

== Club career ==
Sosa began his professional career in Paraguay, and had a spell with Sportivo Luqueño. He had a brief loan spell with Emelec in Serie A de Ecuador during 1993. Sosa finished his career playing in Bolivia with Club San José, The Strongest and Unión Central.

== International career ==
Sosa made two appearances for the senior Paraguay national football team during 1999. He also played for Paraguay at the 1992 Summer Olympics in Barcelona. Sosa made his international debut for Paraguay on 21 April 1996 in a friendly match against Bosnia (3-0 win) in Asunción.
