= Flávio Donizete =

Brazilian footballer (born 1984)

Flavio Donizete
Personal information
- Full name: Flávio Donizete da Costa
- Date of birth: 16 January 1984 (age 41)
- Place of birth: Itapecerica, Brazil
- Height: 1.83 m (6 ft 0 in)
- Position: Defender

Senior career*
Years	Team	Apps	(Gls)
2004–2009	São Paulo	16	(1)
2006	→ Portuguesa (loan)		
2007	→ América-SP (loan)		
2008	→ Atlético Alagoinhas (loan)		
2009	Nacional-SP		
2015	Taboão da Serra		
2019	Portuguesa		
- * Club domestic league appearances and goals

Flávio Donizete da Costa (born 16 January 1984) is a Brazilian former professional footballer who played as a defender.

== Career ==
In 2005, Donizete won the 2005 Club World Cup with São Paulo. However, he eventually sold his winners' medal to get money after becoming addicted to cocaine in 2010. As a result of his addiction, he was unable to continue his football career for years and spent months in rehabilitation.
