= Thiago Lugano =

Uruguayan footballer (born 2006)

Personal information
- Full name: Thiago Matías Lugano Roncio
- Date of birth: 2 November 2006 (age 19)
- Place of birth: Istanbul, Turkey
- Height: 1.82 m (6 ft 0 in)
- Position: Midfielder

Team information
- Current team: Nardò (on loan from Beerschot)

Youth career
- –2023: Montevideo City Torque
- 2023–2025: Real Valladolid

Senior career*
Years	Team	Apps	(Gls)
2025–	Beerschot	0	(0)
2026	→ Pontedera (loan)	1	(0)
2026–	→ Nardò (loan)	0	(0)

International career
2024	Uruguay U20	1	(0)
- * Club domestic league appearances and goals as of 30 August 2026

Thiago Matías Lugano Roncio (born 2 November 2006) is a Uruguayan professional footballer who plays as a midfielder for Italian Serie D club Nardò on loan from Belgian club Beerschot.

== Career ==
Lugano started his youth career with Montevideo City Torque. He joined the youth academy of Spanish club Real Valladolid in 2023. In June 2025, he joined Belgian club Beerschot on a two-year contract.

Lugano has appeared in a match for the Uruguay under-20 team.

== Personal life ==
Lugano is the son of former Uruguay national team captain Diego Lugano. He was born in Turkey while his father was a Fenerbahçe player. His eldest brother Nicolás is also a professional footballer.
