= Danilo Gomes (footballer, born 1981) =

Brazilian footballer

Personal information
- Full name: Danilo Gustavo Vergne Gomes
- Date of birth: 15 October 1981 (age 45)
- Place of birth: Salvador, Brazil
- Height: 1.74 m (5 ft 8 1/2 in)
- Position: Midfielder

Team information
- Current team: Galícia

Senior career*
Years	Team	Apps	(Gls)
2000	Vitória		
2001	Portuguesa Desportos		
2002–2004	Bahia		
2004	Internacional		
2005	FC Tokyo		
2005–2006	Atlas		
2006	Cruz Azul		
2007	Bahia		
2007–2008	Atlas		
2008–2009	León	10	(3)
2010	Bragantino	6	(0)
2011	Fluminense de Feira	7	(2)
2011	São José-RS	6	(0)
2011	Treze	8	(0)
2012	Paulista	9	(5)
2012	Red Bull Brasil	10	(2)
2012	Guaratinguetá	14	(1)
2013	Mirassol	1	(0)
2013	Salgueiro	2	(0)
2014–2015	Galícia	7	(0)
- * Club domestic league appearances and goals as of 17:24, 12 June 2021 (UTC)

Danilo Gustavo Vergne Gomes (born 15 October 1981) is a Brazilian former football player.

== Club career statistics ==
Club performance			League		Cup		League Cup		Total	
Season	Club	League	Apps	Goals	Apps	Goals	Apps	Goals	Apps	Goals
Japan			League		Emperor's Cup		League Cup		Total	
2005	FC Tokyo	J1 League	5	0	0	0	3	0	8	0
Total	Japan		5	0	0	0	3	0	8	0
Career total			5	0	0	0	3	0	8	0
