= Nicolás Lugano =

Uruguayan footballer (born 2000)

Personal information
- Full name: Nicolás Alfredo Lugano Roncio
- Date of birth: 7 July 2000 (age 26)
- Place of birth: Canelones, Uruguay
- Height: 1.75 m (5 ft 9 in)
- Position: Defender

Team information
- Current team: Capital
- Number: 2

Youth career
- 2017–2019: Defensor Sporting
- 2020: Plaza Colonia

Senior career*
Years	Team	Apps	(Gls)
2020-2022	Cancún	3	(0)
2022-2023	Sud América	5	(0)
2023	Tacuary	0	(0)
2024	Caxias	0	(0)
2025–	La Luz	13	(0)
- * Club domestic league appearances and goals as of 20 May 2025

Nicolás Alfredo Lugano Roncio (born 7 July 2000 in Canelones) is a Uruguayan footballer who plays as a defender. He has played for Cancún F.C. (2020–2022), Sud América (2022–2023), Tacuary (2023), and Sociedade Esportiva e Recreativa Caxias do Sul (2024). Currently he plays for Capital FC

He is the eldest child of former footballer Diego Lugano, who played with Fenerbahçe; Nicolás Lugano also played at its baby team. His younger brother Thiago is also a footballer. Nicolás Lugano is father of a child, Tomás.
