= Lucano =

Lucano may refer to:

== People ==
- Domenico Lucano, mayor of Italian city of Riace

== Places ==
in the Southern Italian region of Basilicata, Italy

- Muro Lucano, a city and comune in the province of Potenza
- Oliveto Lucano, a town and comune in the province of Matera
- Oppido Lucano, a town and comune in the province of Potenza
- San Giorgio Lucano, a town and comune in the province of Matera
- San Severino Lucano, a town and comune in the province of Potenza

Angola

- Luacano, a municipality in Moxico Province, Angola

== Others ==
- Amaro Lucano, Italian liqueur in the Amaro category produced by Amaro Lucano S.p.A., a family-owned company based in Pisticci, Basilicata
- Calore Lucano (or Calore Salernitano), a river in Campania, southern Italy, in the province of Salerno, within Cilento and an important left tributary of the Sele. In ancient times it was known as Calor
- Lucano, a car brand marketed in Iran, originally known as Jaecoo outside Iran

== See also ==
- Lugano
