= Ilson Wilians =

Brazilian footballer (born 1979)

Personal information
- Full name: Ilson Wilians Rodrigues
- Date of birth: 12 March 1979 (age 47)
- Height: 1.78 m (5 ft 10 in)
- Position: Defender

Senior career*
Years	Team	Apps	(Gls)
–2004	Coritiba		
2004–2006	FC Shinnik Yaroslavl		
2006	Londrina		
2006	C.S. Marítimo		
2007–2008	América Futebol Clube (SP)		
- * Club domestic league appearances and goals

Ilson Wilians Rodrigues (born 12 March 1979) is a Brazilian former footballer. His previous clubs include FC Shinnik Yaroslavl and C.S. Marítimo.
