= Marcelo Lopes (footballer, born 1975) =

Brazilian footballer

Personal information
- Full name: Marcelo Lopes de Faria
- Date of birth: 17 May 1975 (age 51)
- Place of birth: Tuneiras do Oeste, Brazil
- Height: 1.81 m (5 ft 11 in)
- Position: Defender

Youth career
- Cianorte

Senior career*
Years	Team	Apps	(Gls)
1993–1995	União São João	37	(2)
- Mogi Mirim
- Santo André
- XV de Piracicaba
- Mirassol
2005	Fortaleza	16	(1)
- Guarani
2007–2008	Cianorte		
2008	Marcílio Dias		
2008	Guarany de Sobral		
2009	Potiguar de Mossoró		
- * Club domestic league appearances and goals as of 15:20, 15 January 2008 (UTC) ‡ National team caps and goals as of 15:20, 15 January 2008 (UTC)

Marcelo Lopes de Faria or simply Marcelo Lopes (born 17 May 1975) is a Brazilian football defender,

He previously played for União São João, Fortaleza in the Campeonato Brasileiro Série A. and Potiguar de Mossoró in the Campeonato Potiguar
