= Geufer =

Brazilian footballer (born 1980)

Personal information
- Full name: Geufer Rafael Hallmann
- Date of birth: December 6, 1980 (age 45)
- Place of birth: Estância Velha, Brazil
- Height: 1.87 m (6 ft 2 in)
- Position: Striker

Team information
- Current team: AD Camacha
- Number: 25

Senior career*
Years	Team	Apps	(Gls)
1998–2000	Juventude	-	(-)
2000–2001	São Bento	-	(-)
2001–2004	Juventude	-	(-)
2004–2005	União Leiria	-	(-)
2005–2006	União Madeira	-	(-)
2006–2006	Fortaleza	-	(-)
2006–2007	Nacional	-	(-)
2007–2008	Villa Nova	-	(-)
2008–	AD Camacha	-	(-)
- * Club domestic league appearances and goals

Geufer Rafael Hallmann known as Geufer born on 6 December 1980 in Estância Velha, Brazil is a Brazilian footballer who plays for Portuguese team Camacha as a striker in the Portuguese Second Division Serie A. His previous clubs include Juventude, São Bento, União Leiria, União Madeira, Fortaleza, Nacional and Villa Nova.
