= Carlos Alberto (footballer, born 1981) =

Brazilian footballer

Personal information
- Full name: Carlos Alberto Pereira Silveira
- Date of birth: 23 April 1981 (age 45)
- Place of birth: Pelotas, Brazil
- Height: 1.87 m (6 ft 2 in)
- Position: Defensive midfielder

Youth career
- –1999: Farroupilha

Senior career*
Years	Team	Apps	(Gls)
1999–2000	Farroupilha		
2000–2001	Campomaiorense		
2001	→ América Mineiro (loan)		
2002–2004	Botafogo		
2002–2003	→ São Paulo (loan)	40	(2)
2003	→ Santa Cruz (loan)		
2004–2006	Germinal Beerschot		
2005	→ Paysandu (loan)		
2006–2007	Brasiliense		
2007	→ Santa Cruz-RS (loan)		
2008–2009	Portuguesa		
2009	Vitória		
2010	Botafogo-DF		
2010	América-RN		
2011	Veranópolis		
2011	Duque de Caxias		
2011–2012	Bragantino		
2012	Ceará		
2012	Vitória-PE		
2012	Farroupilha		
2013	América-PE		
2013	Paranavaí		
2013	Guarany de Camaquã		
2013	Auto Esporte		
2014	Pelotas		
2014	Guarani de Juazeiro		
2015	Nova Prata		
- * Club domestic league appearances and goals

Carlos Alberto Pereira Silveira (born 23 April 1981), better known as Carlos Alberto, is a Brazilian former professional footballer who played as a defensive midfielder.

== Honours ==
América Mineiro

- Campeonato Mineiro: 2001

Vitória

- Campeonato Baiano: 2009
