= Fabiano (footballer, born 1979) =

Brazilian footballer

Personal information
- Full name: Fabiano Lima Rodrigues
- Date of birth: 27 June 1979 (age 47)
- Place of birth: Cajamar, Brazil
- Height: 1.75 m (5 ft 9 in)
- Positions: Left back; left winger

Senior career*
| Years | Team | Apps | (Gls) |
| 1997–1999 | Nacional (SP) | | |
| 2000–2002 | Atlético Paranaense | 71 | (6) |
| 2003 | São Paulo | 36 | (1) |
| 2004 | Perugia | 12 | (0) |
| 2004 | Fenerbahçe | 14 | (0) |
| 2005 | Palmeiras | 21 | (0) |
| 2006 | Arezzo | 9 | (1) |
| 2006–2010 | Genoa | 63 | (0) |
| 2008–2009 | → Celta de Vigo (loan) | 10 | (0) |
| 2009 | → Vicenza (loan) | 14 | (0) |
| 2010 | Guarani | 9 | (0) |
| 2011 | Criciúma | 0 | (0) |
- * Club domestic league appearances and goals

Fabiano Lima Rodrigues (born 27 June 1979), known as Fabiano, is a Brazilian former professional footballer who played as a left-back.

== Career ==
=== Genoa ===
Fabiano signed for Genoa in August 2006. He won Serie A promotion in June 2007 by finished third in Serie B with the club.

In August 2008, he was loaned to Celta Vigo.

On 4 August 2009, he was loaned to Vicenza. But in January 2010 he returned to Genoa.

=== Guava ===
In April 2010, he signed a contract until the end of year 2010 with Guava.

== Honours ==
- Campeonato Brasileiro Série A: 2001
- Süper Lig: 2005
- Campeonato Paranaense: 2001, 2002
