= Adriano (footballer, born June 1979) =

Brazilian footballer

Personal information
- Full name: Adriano Ferreira Silvestre
- Date of birth: June 10, 1979 (age 47)
- Place of birth: Santos, Brazil
- Height: 1.78 m (5 ft 10 in)
- Position: Defensive midfielder

Youth career
- 1996: Mamoré

Senior career*
| Years | Team | Apps | (Gls) |
| 1998 | Cruzeiro | | |
| 1998–2001 | Portuguesa-SP | | |
| 2001 | Goiás | | |
| 2002 | Coritiba | | |
| 2003 | Mogi Mirim | | |
| 2003 | Portuguesa-SP | | |
| 2003–2004 | São Paulo | | |
| 2005 | Juventude | | |
| 2005 | Avaí | | |
| 2006 | Juventus-SP | | |
| 2007 | Bragantino | | |
| 2007 | Paraná | | |
| 2008–2010 | Marítimo | | |
| 2008–2009 | → Bragantino (Loan) | | |
| 2010 | Bragantino | | |
| 2011 | Mixto | | |
- * Club domestic league appearances and goals

Adriano Ferreira Silvestre (born June 10, 1979), or simply Adriano, is a Brazilian former professional footballer who played as a defensive midfielder.

== Career ==
In January 2008, Adriano moved to Portuguese side Marítimo from Paraná and then played for the club and the reserve team through 2010.
