= Régis (footballer, born 1976) =

Brazilian football coach and former player (born 1976)

Personal information
- Full name: Régis Amarante Lima de Quadros
- Date of birth: 3 June 1976 (age 50)
- Place of birth: Porto Alegre, Rio Grande do Sul, Brazil
- Height: 1.84 m (6 ft 0 in)
- Position: Central defender

Team information
- Current team: Rio Verde (head coach)

Senior career*
Years	Team	Apps	(Gls)
1996–1999	Internacional		
2000–2001	Fluminense		
2002	São Paulo		
2003–2004	Saturn	9	(1)
2004–2005	Cruzeiro		
2005	Brasiliense		
2006	Ponte Preta		
2006	Coritiba		
2007	Viborg		
2007	Juventude		
2008	Paysandu		
2009	Figueirense		
2010	Vila Nova		

Managerial career
- 2013: Brasil de Farroupilha
- 2016: Avenida
- 2016: Boavista
- 2017–: Rio Verde
- * Club domestic league appearances and goals

Régis Amarante Lima de Quadros (born 3 June 1976) is a Brazilian football coach and a former player who played as a central-defender. He is the coach of Rio Verde.

== Club career ==
Régis played for Fluminense, Internacional and São Paulo in the Campeonato Brasileiro. He also had a spell with Saturn in the Russian Premier League, and Viborg in the Danish Superliga.

== Honours ==
Internacional

- Campeonato Gaúcho: 1997

Fluminense

- Campeonato Carioca: 2002
