= Dill (footballer) =

Brazilian footballer (born 1974)

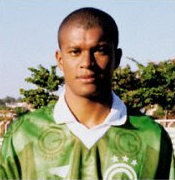

Personal information
- Full name: Elpídio Barbosa Conceição
- Date of birth: March 4, 1974 (age 52)
- Place of birth: São Luís, Brazil
- Height: 1.68 m (5 ft 6 in)
- Position: Forward

Youth career
- 1991: Santa Cruz-DF
- 1992: Brasília
- 1992–1994: Goiás

Senior career*
Years	Team	Apps	(Gls)
1994–2001	Goiás	68	(28)
2001	Marseille	5	(0)
2001	→ Servette (loan)	4	(2)
2002	São Paulo	14	(1)
2003–2004	Botafogo	0	(0)
2004	Flamengo	7	(0)
2005	Bahia	0	(0)
2005	Brasiliense	9	(1)
2005–2006	Penafiel	14	(1)
2006–2007	Aves	5	(0)
2007–2008	Famalicão		
2008	Sūduva		
2009	Santa Cruz		
2009–2010	Foz		
- * Club domestic league appearances and goals

Elpídio Barbosa Conceição, also known as Dill (born March 4, 1974) is a Brazilian retired footballer who played as a forward.

In a 16-year professional career, he played for several Série A clubs, being the top scorer in 2000, and also competed in four other countries, namely in Portugal.

== Early career ==
Born in São Luís, Maranhão, Dill started his career playing futsal in 1991, defending Santa Cruz-DF of Distrito Federal, moving to Brasília Futebol Clube in 1992.

== Football career ==
Dill was transferred to Goiás Esporte Clube in 1992, playing his first professional game two years later, against Goiatuba Esporte Clube. He was crowned the top goalscorer of the Goiás State Championship in 2000 with 20 goals, netting 10 in the following year's Center-West Cup. He added 20 Série A goals in the 2000 season, tied with Romário and Magno Alves.

Dill played 68 top division games for Goiás and scored 28 goals during his spell. His first abroad adventure was unassuming, as he only scored twice in just nine games for Olympique de Marseille and Servette FC combined.

Dill returned to Brazil in 2002, moving to São Paulo Futebol Clube and leaving the club after playing 14 top level games. After representing Botafogo de Futebol e Regatas for two years, he joined Clube de Regatas do Flamengo in 2004, moving to Esporte Clube Bahia in 2005, and leaving for Brasiliense Futebol Clube shortly after.

Dill spent the following three seasons in Portugal, suffering consecutive top division relegations with F.C. Penafiel and C.D. Aves, then playing in the lower leagues with F.C. Famalicão.

After a few months with FK Sūduva Marijampolė from Lithuania, Dill returned to his country and signed for Santa Cruz Futebol Clube. He moved back to Portugal shortly after, retiring after one season in the third regional division with Futebol Clube da Foz.

== Honors ==
=== Individual ===
- Goiás State Championship: Top scorer 2000
- Center-West Cup: Top scorer 2001
