= Marcelo Portugal Gouvêa =

Brazilian lawyer and football club owner (1938-2008)

Marcelo Figueiredo Portugal Gouvêa (born March 2, 1938 - November 29, 2008) was the chairman of São Paulo Futebol Clube in Brazil from 2002 to 2006.

Gouvêa started his chairmanship in 2002, along with his friend, director of football, and presidential successor since April 2007, Juvenal Juvêncio (who has already been the club's chairman, from 1988 to 1990).

During his period as the chairman, Gouvêa has led the club to many achievements, such as the victories at the FIFA Club World Championship, the Libertadores Cup, and in the Paulista Championship, all in 2005. He is also known for investments made in young players, with the creation of the Laudo Natel Training Center in Cotia, a few miles away from São Paulo.
