= 2004 Campeonato Brasileiro Série A =

Campeonato Brasileiro Série A
- Season: 2004
- Champions: Santos; 2nd Campeonato Brasileiro title 8th Brazilian title
- Relegated: Criciúma; Guarani; Vitória; Grêmio
- Copa Libertadores: Santos; Atlético Paranaense; São Paulo; Palmeiras
- Copa Sudamericana: Corinthians; Goiás; Juventude; Internacional; Fluminense
- Matches: 552
- Goals: 1,536 (2.78 per match)
- Top goalscorer: Washington (34 goals)
- Biggest home win: São Paulo 7–0 Paysandu (R33, 28 September)
- Biggest away win: Corinthians 0–5 Atlético Paranaense (R7, 23 May); Atlético Mineiro 0–5 São Paulo (R36, 17 October)
- Highest scoring: Criciúma 7–2 Goiás (R6, 16 May)
- Highest attendance: 50,650; Atlético Mineiro 3–0 São Caetano (R46, 19 December)
- Total attendance: 4,170,639
- Average attendance: 7,556

The 2004 Campeonato Brasileiro Série A was the 48th edition of the Campeonato Brasileiro Série A. The competition was won by Santos, coached by Vanderlei Luxemburgo. Runners-up were Atlético Paranaense, which led the competition for 11 weeks and lost the title in the penultimate round. The other teams qualified for the Copa Libertadores were from the state of São Paulo, São Paulo and Palmeiras. The highest goal scorer was Washington (Atlético Paranaense), who scored 34 goals and broke the tournament's record. Beginning two seasons were four teams would be relegated and only two promoted so the tournament would have 20 teams by 2006, the four teams relegated to the second division were Criciúma, Guarani, Vitória and Grêmio.

== Format ==
For the second consecutive season, the tournament was played in a double round-robin system. The team with most points at the end of the season will be declared champion. The bottom four teams will be relegated and will play in the Campeonato Brasileiro Série B in the 2005 season.

=== International qualification ===
The Série A will serve as a qualifier to CONMEBOL's 2005 Copa Libertadores. The top-three teams in the standings will qualify to the Second Stage of the competition, while the fourth place in the standings will qualify to the First Stage.

== Teams ==
=== Stadiums and locations ===
Team	Home city	Stadium	Capacity
Atlético Mineiro	Belo Horizonte	Mineirão; Independência (7 matches); Ipatingão (2 matches); Morumbi (one match)	75,783; 30,000; 16,000; 67,428
Atlético Paranaense	Curitiba	Arena da Baixada; Serra Dourada (one match)	28,237; 45,000
Botafogo	Rio de Janeiro	Caio Martins; Maracanã (3 matches); Mario Helênio (one match)	15,000; 87,238; 31,863
Corinthians	São Paulo	Pacaembu; Morumbi (2 matches); Major José Levy Sobrinho (one match)	37,952; 67,428; 18,000
Coritiba	Curitiba	Couto Pereira	38,000
Criciúma	Criciúma	Heriberto Hülse	19,900
Cruzeiro	Belo Horizonte	Mineirão; Independência (2 matches); Ipatingão (one match)	75,783; 30,000; 16,000
Figueirense	Florianópolis	Orlando Scarpelli; Santa Cruz (one match)	19,069; 29,292
Flamengo	Rio de Janeiro	Raulino de Oliveira; Maracanã (6 matches)	21,000; 87,238
Fluminense	Rio de Janeiro	Maracanã; Raulino de Oliveira (7 matches)	87,238; 21,000
Goiás	Goiânia	Serra Dourada	45,000
Grêmio	Porto Alegre	Olímpico; Bento Freitas (2 matches); Colosso da Lagoa (2 matches)	45,000; 18,000; 30,000
Guarani	Campinas	Brinco de Ouro	40,988
Internacional	Porto Alegre	Beira-Rio	56,000
Juventude	Caxias do Sul	Alfredo Jaconi; Colosso da Lagoa (one match)	30,519; 30,000
Palmeiras	São Paulo	Palestra Itália; Pacaembu (2 matches); Morumbi (one match)	29,876; 37,952; 67,428
Paraná	Curitiba	Pinheirão	45,000
Paysandu	Belém	Mangueirão	45,007
Ponte Preta	Campinas	Moisés Lucarelli	19,728
Santos	Santos	Vila Belmiro; Teixeirão (3 matches); Pacaembu (one match); Prudentão (one match); Wilson de Barros (one match)	21,256; 32,168; 37,952; 45,954; 19,900
São Caetano	São Caetano do Sul	Anacleto Campanella	22,738
São Paulo	São Paulo	Morumbi; Pacaembu (one match)	67,428; 37,952
Vasco da Gama	Rio de Janeiro	São Januário; Maracanã (4 matches)	22,150; 87,238
Vitória	Salvador	Barradão	32,000

=== Personnel and kits ===
Team	Manager	Captain	Kit manufacturer	Shirt sponsor	
Team	Manager	Captain	Kit manufacturer	Front	Sleeve
Atlético Mineiro	(Brazil) Procópio Cardoso	(Brazil) Hélcio	(England) Umbro	(Brazil) MRV Engenharia	(Brazil) Centauro
Atlético Paranaense	(Brazil) Levir Culpi	(Brazil) Washington	(England) Umbro	(Mexico) Claro	(Brazil) Varig
Botafogo	(Brazil) Paulo Bonamigo	(Brazil) Fernando	(Italy) Kappa	—	(Brazil) Bob's
Corinthians	(Brazil) Tite	(Brazil) Anderson	(United States) Nike	(United States) Pepsi	(Germany) Siemens
Coritiba	(Brazil) Antonio Lopes	(Brazil) Tuta	(Brazil) Penalty	(Mexico) Claro	—
Criciúma	(Brazil) Lori Sandri	(Brazil) Cléber Gaúcho	(Brazil) Placar	(Brazil) Siecesc	(Mexico) Claro
Cruzeiro	(Brazil) Ney Franco	(Brazil) Cris	(Brazil) Topper	(Germany) Siemens Mobile	—
Figueirense	(Brazil) Ivan Izzo	(Brazil) Márcio Goiano	(England) Umbro	(Brazil) Fame	(Mexico) Claro
Flamengo	(Brazil) Andrade	(Brazil) Fabiano Eller	(United States) Nike	(Brazil) Petrobras	—
Fluminense	(Brazil) Alexandre Gama	(Brazil) Romário	(Germany) Adidas	(Brazil) Unimed	(Brazil) Unimed
Goiás	(Brazil) Celso Roth	(Brazil) Paulo Baier	(Brazil) Topper	(Italy) Fiat	(Brazil) Cifarma
Grêmio	(Brazil) Cláudio Duarte	(Brazil) Claudiomiro	(Italy) Kappa	(Brazil) Banrisul	—
Guarani	(Brazil) Jair Picerni	(Brazil) Jean	(England) Umbro	(Brazil) Medial Saúde	(Brazil) Wizard
Internacional	(Brazil) Muricy Ramalho	(Brazil) Sangaletti	(Brazil) Topper	(Brazil) Banrisul	—
Juventude	(Brazil) Ivo Wortmann	(Brazil) Índio	(Brazil) DalPonte	(Brazil) Duroline	(Brazil) Pigozzi
Palmeiras	(Brazil) Estevam Soares	(Brazil) Baiano	(Italy) Diadora	(Italy) Pirelli	—
Paraná	(Brazil) Paulo Campos	(Brazil) Flávio	(Brazil) Rhumell	(Brazil) Empalux	(Mexico) Claro
Paysandu	(Brazil) Sinomar Naves	(Brazil) Alex Pinho	(Brazil) Finta	(Brazil) Big Ben	(Brazil) Cerpa
Ponte Preta	(Brazil) Nenê Santana	(Brazil) Piá	(Brazil) Penalty	(Brazil) CNA	(Brazil) Paulistão Supermercados
Santos	(Brazil) Vanderlei Luxemburgo	(Brazil) Ricardinho	(England) Umbro	(Brazil) Bombril	(Brazil) Helios
São Caetano	(Brazil) Péricles Chamusca	(Brazil) Sílvio Luiz	(United States) Wilson	(Brazil) Consul	—
São Paulo	(Brazil) Emerson Leão	(Brazil) Rogério Ceni	(Brazil) Topper	(South Korea) LG	(Brazil) Habib's
Vasco da Gama	(Brazil) Joel Santana	(Serbia and Montenegro) Dejan Petković	(England) Umbro	—	(Brazil) RIO
Vitória	(Brazil) Evaristo de Macedo	(Brazil) Edílson	(England) Umbro	(Brazil) Muriel Cosméticos	(Brazil) Lousano

== Standings ==
Pos	Team	Pld	W	D	L	GF	GA	GD	Pts	Qualification or relegation
1	Santos	46	27	8	11	103	58	+45	89	Qualified for the 2005 Copa Libertadores
2	Atlético Paranaense	46	25	11	10	93	56	+37	86	Qualified for the 2005 Copa Libertadores
3	São Paulo	46	24	10	12	78	43	+35	82	Qualified for the 2005 Copa Libertadores
4	Palmeiras	46	22	13	11	72	47	+25	79	Qualified for the 2005 Copa Libertadores
5	Corinthians	46	20	14	12	54	54	0	74	Qualified for the 2005 Copa Sudamericana
6	Goiás	46	21	9	16	81	68	+13	72	Qualified for the 2005 Copa Sudamericana
7	Juventude	46	20	10	16	60	66	−6	70	Qualified for the 2005 Copa Sudamericana
8	Internacional	46	20	7	19	66	59	+7	67	Qualified for the 2005 Copa Sudamericana
9	Fluminense	46	18	13	15	65	68	−3	67	Qualified for the 2005 Copa Sudamericana
10	Ponte Preta	46	19	7	20	43	73	−30	64	
11	Figueirense	46	17	12	17	57	59	−2	63	
12	Coritiba	46	15	17	14	53	48	+5	62	
13	Cruzeiro	46	16	8	22	69	81	−12	56	
14	Paysandu	46	14	14	18	56	76	−20	56	
15	Paraná	46	15	9	22	52	73	−21	54	
16	Vasco	46	14	12	20	64	68	−4	54	
17	Flamengo	46	13	15	18	51	53	−2	54	
18	São Caetano	46	23	8	15	65	49	+16	53 (Note: São Caetano lost 24 points due to the incident leading to the death of footballer Serginho)	
19	Atlético Mineiro	46	12	17	17	60	66	−6	53	
20	Botafogo	46	11	18	17	62	71	−9	51	
21	Criciúma	46	13	11	22	61	78	−17	50	Relegation
22	Guarani	46	11	16	19	43	55	−12	49	Relegation
23	Vitória	46	13	9	24	68	87	−19	48	Relegation
24	Grêmio	46	9	12	25	60	80	−20	39	Relegation

== Positions by round ==
Team ╲ Round	1	2	3	4	5	6	7	8	9	10	11	12	13	14	15	16	17	18	19	20	21	22	23	24	25	26	27	28	29	30	31	32	33	34	35	36	37	38	39	40	41	42	43	44	45	46
Atlético Mineiro	15	16	15	18	19	19	16	16	19	15	19	18	19	16	18	18	20	20	19	17	19	18	17	17	18	18	17	19	19	18	19	19	19	21	19	21	18	20	20	22	18	22	22	22	20	19
Atlético Paranaense	23	23	16	17	17	13	10	5	8	10	8	4	7	8	5	9	7	8	6	7	6	5	5	3	6	3	2	2	2	2	2	2	1	1	1	1	1	2	2	1	1	1	1	1	2	2
Botafogo	24	24	24	24	24	22	22	23	23	24	24	24	23	23	23	23	22	23	24	20	21	21	20	23	21	20	22	22	21	21	21	20	20	17	18	19	20	22	18	21	17	20	17	18	19	20
Corinthians	17	11	17	21	20	16	18	19	21	21	21	22	21	18	16	16	16	17	16	15	11	13	10	8	10	10	8	8	7	8	10	8	9	9	9	8	8	8	8	8	8	8	8	8	5	5
Coritiba	9	8	9	10	14	15	17	20	16	19	18	14	16	19	17	17	17	16	17	18	16	14	12	13	9	9	10	10	10	11	11	11	11	11	11	12	12	12	12	11	12	13	13	13	11	12
Criciúma	8	7	8	5	11	4	2	2	1	2	5	10	11	14	15	14	15	14	14	10	9	9	13	10	12	13	13	14	15	15	18	18	17	19	17	18	17	17	17	17	19	16	19	20	21	21
Cruzeiro	4	3	7	4	9	5	3	8	6	5	7	11	5	10	6	5	10	11	12	13	10	12	9	14	14	11	12	13	13	13	13	13	14	13	13	13	14	13	13	13	14	14	14	15	13	13
Figueirense	7	1	1	3	6	2	7	6	4	3	1	2	3	2	3	4	5	7	3	5	8	8	8	12	11	14	11	11	12	12	12	12	12	12	12	11	11	11	11	12	13	11	10	12	10	11
Flamengo	14	17	20	19	21	23	23	22	22	22	23	21	22	22	24	24	24	22	23	24	24	23	23	20	22	21	19	17	18	19	17	17	16	18	20	17	19	19	21	18	20	21	18	17	18	17
Fluminense	11	14	18	14	13	11	8	11	9	11	14	9	12	9	12	11	11	10	11	12	14	11	15	15	15	15	14	12	11	10	9	10	10	10	8	9	10	10	10	10	10	12	11	9	8	9
Goiás	1	2	11	8	4	9	13	13	12	12	11	13	6	5	7	7	3	5	7	4	3	6	7	7	7	4	5	5	3	3	4	5	8	8	7	7	7	7	7	7	7	6	6	7	7	6
Grêmio	13	15	6	13	12	14	12	14	15	18	15	17	17	20	21	21	18	19	18	19	18	19	19	19	19	19	21	21	22	22	23	22	23	23	23	23	23	24	24	24	24	24	24	24	24	24
Guarani	22	21	13	16	16	21	21	18	20	16	20	19	20	21	20	20	23	24	21	22	22	22	21	21	23	23	23	24	24	24	24	23	24	24	24	24	24	23	23	23	23	23	23	23	23	22
Internacional	21	12	12	9	10	6	5	7	5	6	9	5	8	6	8	6	8	9	10	11	13	16	14	11	13	12	15	16	14	14	14	15	13	14	14	14	13	14	15	14	11	9	12	10	9	8
Juventude	18	19	21	15	18	18	15	12	13	14	13	15	18	15	11	10	9	6	8	8	7	7	6	5	4	5	3	4	4	6	7	6	5	4	5	6	6	6	6	6	6	7	7	6	6	7
Palmeiras	12	22	19	12	8	12	9	4	7	8	3	1	1	1	2	1	2	3	5	3	5	4	4	2	1	2	4	3	5	7	6	4	3	6	6	5	5	4	4	4	3	4	5	5	4	4
Paraná	3	13	5	11	7	10	14	15	14	17	17	20	15	17	19	19	21	18	20	21	23	24	24	24	24	24	24	23	23	23	22	24	22	22	21	22	22	21	22	20	22	18	16	14	15	15
Paysandu	10	18	23	23	23	24	24	24	24	23	22	23	24	24	22	22	19	21	22	23	20	20	22	22	20	22	20	18	17	16	15	14	15	15	15	15	15	16	16	16	16	19	20	19	17	14
Ponte Preta	2	4	2	1	5	7	6	9	10	7	2	6	9	7	9	8	4	2	4	6	4	3	3	6	5	7	7	6	9	9	8	7	7	7	10	10	9	9	9	9	9	10	9	11	12	10
Santos	16	10	14	20	15	17	19	21	17	13	12	7	4	3	1	2	1	1	1	1	1	1	1	1	2	1	1	1	1	1	1	1	2	2	2	2	2	1	1	2	2	2	2	2	1	1
São Caetano	6	6	4	6	2	3	1	1	3	1	4	8	10	13	14	12	13	12	9	9	12	10	11	9	8	8	9	9	8	4	3	3	4	3	4	4	4	5	5	5	4	5	4	4	16	18
São Paulo	5	5	3	2	1	1	4	3	2	4	6	3	2	4	4	3	6	4	2	2	2	2	2	4	3	6	6	7	6	5	5	9	6	5	3	3	3	3	3	3	5	3	3	3	3	3
Vasco da Gama	20	20	22	22	22	20	20	17	18	20	16	16	14	12	13	15	12	15	13	14	15	17	18	18	16	16	16	15	16	17	16	16	18	16	16	16	16	15	14	15	15	15	15	16	14	16
Vitória	19	9	10	7	3	8	11	10	11	9	10	12	13	11	10	13	14	13	15	16	17	15	16	16	17	17	18	20	20	20	20	21	21	20	22	20	21	18	19	19	21	17	21	21	22	23

== Top scorers ==
Pos.	Scorer	Club	Goals
1	(Brazil) Washington	Atlético-PR	34
2	(Brazil) Deivid	Santos	22
2	(Brazil) Alex Dias	Goiás	22
3	(Brazil) Robinho	Santos	21
4	(Brazil) Fabrício Carvalho	São Caetano	19
4	(Brazil) Edílson	Vitória	19
4	(Brazil) Cláudio Pitbull	Grêmio	19

== Coaching changes ==
Team	Outgoing head coach	Date of vacancy	Position in table	Incoming head coach	Date of appointment
Botafogo	(Brazil) Levir Culpi	26 April 2004	23rd	(Brazil) Luiz Matter (interim)	28 April 2004
Santos	(Brazil) Émerson Leão	6 May 2004	17th	(Brazil) Vanderlei Luxemburgo	8 May 2004
Botafogo	(Brazil) Luiz Matter (interim)	16 May 2004	21st	(Brazil) Mauro Galvão	18 May 2004
Cruzeiro	(Brazil) PC Gusmão (interim)	16 May 2004	4th	(Brazil) Émerson Leão	18 May 2004
Palmeiras	(Brazil) Jair Picerni	21 May 2004	11th	(Brazil) Estevam Soares	23 May 2004
Ponte Preta	(Brazil) Estevam Soares	23 May 2004	5th	(Brazil) Marco Aurélio	8 June 2004
Corinthians	(Brazil) Oswaldo de Oliveira	24 May 2004	16th	(Brazil) Tite	27 May 2004
Grêmio	(Brazil) Adílson Batista	4 June 2004	14th	(Brazil) José Luiz Plein	8 June 2004
Paraná	(Brazil) Paulo Campos	26 June 2004	16th	(Brazil) Gilson Kleina	4 July 2004
Internacional	(Brazil) Lori Sandri	28 June 2004	8th	(Brazil) Joel Santana	2 July 2004
Vitória	(Brazil) Agnaldo Liz	30 June 2004	9th	(Brazil) Oswaldo de Oliveira	1 July 2004
Flamengo	(Brazil) Abel Braga	18 July 2004	23rd	(Brazil) Andrade (interim)	20 July 2004
Atlético Mineiro	(Brazil) Paulo Bonamigo	19 July 2004	18th	(Brazil) Jair Picerni	19 July 2004
Flamengo	(Brazil) Andrade (interim)	28 July 2004	22nd	(Brazil) PC Gusmão	28 July 2004
Cruzeiro	(Brazil) Émerson Leão	29 July 2004	10th	(Brazil) Ney Franco (interim)	31 July 2004
Ponte Preta	(Brazil) Marco Aurélio	1 August 2004	5th	(Brazil) Nenê Santana	4 August 2004
Cruzeiro	(Brazil) Ney Franco (interim)	5 August 2004	10th	(Brazil) Marco Aurélio	5 August 2004
Fluminense	(Brazil) Ricardo Gomes	15 August 2004	14th	(Brazil) Alexandre Gama	19 August 2004
Botafogo	(Brazil) Mauro Galvão	16 August 2004	22nd	(Brazil) Paulo Bonamigo	17 August 2004
Flamengo	(Brazil) PC Gusmão	16 August 2004	19th	(Brazil) Ricardo Gomes	20 August 2004
Vitória	(Brazil) Oswaldo de Oliveira	19 August 2004	16th	(Brazil) Hélio dos Anjos	19 August 2004
Paraná	(Brazil) Gilson Kleina	28 August 2004	23rd	(Brazil) Paulo Campos	1 September 2004
Internacional	(Brazil) Joel Santana	2 September 2004	14th	(Brazil) Muricy Ramalho	2 September 2004
São Paulo	(Brazil) Cuca	2 September 2004	7th	(Brazil) Émerson Leão	3 September 2004
Grêmio	(Brazil) José Luiz Plein	10 September 2004	21st	(Brazil) Cuca	10 September 2004
Vasco	(Brazil) Geninho	27 September 2004	16th	(Brazil) Joel Santana	27 September 2004
Vitória	(Brazil) Hélio dos Anjos	30 September 2004	21st	(Brazil) Evaristo de Macedo	30 September 2004
Atlético Mineiro	(Brazil) Jair Picerni	3 October 2004	22nd	(Brazil) Mário Sérgio	5 October 2004
Grêmio	(Brazil) Cuca	27 October 2004	24th	(Brazil) Claúdio Duarte	27 October 2004
Flamengo	(Brazil) Ricardo Gomes	1 November 2004	22nd	(Brazil) Andrade (interim)	6 November 2004
Cruzeiro	(Brazil) Marco Aurélio	17 November 2004	13th	(Brazil) Ney Franco (interim)	21 November 2004
Atlético Mineiro	(Brazil) Mário Sérgio	28 November 2004	22nd	(Brazil) Procópio Cardoso	4 December 2004

== Attendances ==
#	Club	Average attendance
1	Paysandu SC	14,834
2	Atlético Paranaense	14,041
3	Corinthians	13,705
4	Santos FC	12,914
5	Palmeiras	12,815
6	Figueirense	11,950
7	Flamengo	10,407
8	Atlético Mineiro	10,248
9	Internacional	9,716
10	Goiás EC	9,278
11	São Paulo FC	8,570
12	Coritiba FC	8,352
13	Grêmio	7,959
14	Fluminense	7,780
15	Criciúma EC	7,405
16	Juventude	6,613
17	Vitória	5,933
18	Botafogo	5,723
19	Cruzeiro	5,082
20	Vasco da Gama	4,886
21	Paraná Clube	4,858
22	Guarani FC	3,852
23	AA Ponte Preta	3,825
24	AD São Caetano	2,472
