= 2001 Campeonato Brasileiro Série A =

Campeonato Brasileiro Série A
- Season: 2001
- Dates: 1 August – 23 December
- Champions: Atlético Paranaense (1st title)
- Relegated: Santa Cruz; Botafogo-SP; América-MG; Sport Recife
- Copa Libertadores: Atlético Paranaense; São Caetano; Grêmio (via Copa do Brasil); Flamengo (via Copa dos Campeões)
- Matches: 386
- Goals: 1,105 (2.86 per match)
- Top goalscorer: Romário (21 goals)
- Biggest home win: Vasco da Gama 7–1 Guarani (R2, 5 August); Vasco da Gama 7–1 São Paulo (R26, 25 November)
- Average attendance: 11401

The 2001 Campeonato Brasileiro Série A, known as Brasileirão TAM 2001 for sponsorship reasons, was the 45th edition of the Campeonato Brasileiro Série A. It began on August 1, 2001, and ended on December 23, 2001. Atlético Paranaense won the competition.

== Format ==
The 28 teams played against each other once. The eight best placed teams qualified for the quarter-finals, in which the eighth-placed team played against the first-placed team, the seventh-placed team played against the second-placed team, the sixth-placed team played against the third-placed team, and the fifth-placed team played against the fourth-placed team. The quarter-finals and the semi-finals were played over one leg while the finals were played over two legs. The four worst teams in the first stage were relegated to the Campeonato Brasileiro Série B of the following year.

== First stage standings ==
Pos	Team	Pld	W	D	L	GF	GA	GD	Pts	Qualification
1	São Caetano	27	18	5	4	48	25	+23	59	Qualification for the quarter-finals
2	Atlético-PR	27	15	6	6	40	18	+22	51	Qualification for the quarter-finals
3	Fluminense	27	14	9	4	44	29	+15	51	Qualification for the quarter-finals
4	Atlético Mineiro	27	15	4	8	50	34	+16	49	Qualification for the quarter-finals
5	Grêmio	27	14	5	8	39	29	+10	47	Qualification for the quarter-finals
6	Ponte Preta	27	13	8	6	53	48	+5	47	Qualification for the quarter-finals
7	São Paulo	27	13	7	7	48	34	+14	46	Qualification for the quarter-finals
8	Bahia	27	13	6	8	43	38	+5	45	Qualification for the quarter-finals
9	Internacional	27	12	4	11	38	40	−2	40	Intermediate zone
10	Goiás	27	12	3	12	38	32	+6	39	Intermediate zone
11	Vasco	27	10	9	8	57	36	+21	39	Intermediate zone
12	Palmeiras	27	12	2	13	39	48	−9	38	Intermediate zone
13	Portuguesa	27	11	4	12	31	33	−2	37	Intermediate zone
14	Paraná	27	11	3	13	35	37	−2	36	Intermediate zone
15	Santos	27	9	9	9	37	32	+5	36	Intermediate zone
16	Vitória	27	9	9	9	33	37	−4	36	Intermediate zone
17	Coritiba	27	9	8	10	31	32	−1	35	Intermediate zone
18	Corinthians	27	9	7	11	46	45	+1	34	Intermediate zone
19	Guarani	27	9	6	12	29	45	−16	33	Intermediate zone
20	Gama	27	8	9	10	40	34	+6	33	Intermediate zone
21	Cruzeiro	27	9	5	13	36	43	−7	32	Intermediate zone
22	Juventude	27	6	12	9	29	37	−8	30	Intermediate zone
23	Botafogo-RJ	27	8	5	14	41	51	−10	29	Intermediate zone
24	Flamengo	27	8	5	14	25	38	−13	29	Intermediate zone
25	Santa Cruz	27	7	6	14	31	50	−19	27	Relegation zone
26	Botafogo-SP	27	6	7	14	23	41	−18	25	Relegation zone
27	América-MG	27	6	7	14	32	46	−14	25	Relegation zone
28	Sport	27	5	4	18	24	46	−22	19	Relegation zone

== Final stage ==
Quarterfinals
1	São Caetano	0
8	Bahia	0
4	Grêmio	0
5	Atlético Mineiro	3
2	Fluminense	3
7	Ponte Preta	2
3	São Paulo	1
6	Atlético-PR	2

Semifinals
São Caetano	2
Atlético Mineiro	1
Fluminense	2
Atlético-PR	3

Finals
São Caetano	2	0
Atlético-PR	4	1

== Finals ==
December 16, 2001
17:00 (UTC-3)

Atlético Paranaense	4 – 2	São Caetano
Ilan 4'; Alex Mineiro 55', 80' (pen.), 90+2'		Mancini 31'; Marcos Paulo 53'

Arena da Baixada (Curitiba)
Attendance: 31,740
Referee: Carlos Eugênio Simon Rio Grande do Sul

Atlético-PR: Flávio; Rogério Corrêa, Nem and Gustavo; Alessandro, Cocito, Adriano, Kléberson and Fabiano (Igor); Ilan (Souza) and Alex Mineiro. Head coach: Geninho.

São Caetano: Sílvio Luiz; Mancini, Daniel, Dininho and Marcos Paulo; Simão, Serginho, Adãozinho and Esquerdinha; Anaílson (Müller) and Magrão. Head coach: Jair Picerni.

December 23, 2001
17:00 (UTC-3)

São Caetano	0 – 1	Atlético Paranaense
		Alex Mineiro 67'

Anacleto Campanella (São Caetano do Sul)
Attendance: 20,000
Referee: Carlos Eugênio Simon Rio Grande do Sul

São Caetano: Sílvio Luiz; Mancini, Daniel, Dininho and Marcos Paulo (Müller); Simão, Serginho (Bechara), Adãozinho and Esquerdinha (Marlon); Anaílson and Magrão. Head coach: Jair Picerni.

Atlético-PR: Flávio; Nem, Gustavo and Rogério Corrêa (Igor); Alessandro, Cocito (Pires), Adriano, Kléberson and Fabiano; Kléber (Souza) and Alex Mineiro. Head coach: Geninho.

== Final standings ==
Pos	Team	Pld	W	D	L	GF	GA	GD	Pts	Qualification or relegation
1	Atlético-PR	31	19	6	6	68	45	+23	63	Qualified to Copa Libertadores 2002
2	São Caetano	31	19	6	6	52	31	+21	63	Qualified to Copa Libertadores 2002
3	Fluminense	29	15	9	5	49	34	+15	54	Eliminated in the Semi-finals
4	Atlético Mineiro	29	16	4	9	54	36	+18	52	Eliminated in the Semi-finals
5	Grêmio	28	14	5	9	39	32	+7	47	Eliminated in the Quarter-finals
6	Ponte Preta	28	13	8	7	55	51	+4	47	Eliminated in the Quarter-finals
7	São Paulo	28	13	7	8	49	36	+13	46	Eliminated in the Quarter-finals
8	Bahia	28	13	7	8	43	38	+5	46	Eliminated in the Quarter-finals
9	Internacional	27	12	4	11	38	40	−2	40	Eliminated in the First Stage
10	Goiás	27	12	3	12	38	32	+6	39	Eliminated in the First Stage
11	Vasco	27	10	9	8	57	36	+21	39	Eliminated in the First Stage
12	Palmeiras	27	12	2	13	39	48	−9	38	Eliminated in the First Stage
13	Portuguesa	27	11	4	12	31	33	−2	37	Eliminated in the First Stage
14	Paraná	27	11	3	13	35	37	−2	36	Eliminated in the First Stage
15	Santos	27	9	9	9	37	32	+5	36	Eliminated in the First Stage
16	Vitória	27	9	9	9	33	37	−4	36	Eliminated in the First Stage
17	Coritiba	27	9	8	10	31	32	−1	35	Eliminated in the First Stage
18	Corinthians	27	9	7	11	46	45	+1	34	Eliminated in the First Stage
19	Guarani	27	9	6	12	29	45	−16	33	Eliminated in the First Stage
20	Gama	27	8	9	10	40	34	+6	33	Eliminated in the First Stage
21	Cruzeiro	27	9	5	13	36	43	−7	32	Eliminated in the First Stage
22	Juventude	27	6	12	9	29	37	−8	30	Eliminated in the First Stage
23	Botafogo-RJ	27	8	5	14	41	51	−10	29	Eliminated in the First Stage
24	Flamengo	27	8	5	14	25	38	−13	29	Eliminated in the First Stage
25	Santa Cruz	27	7	6	14	31	50	−19	27	Relegated to Série B 2002
26	Botafogo-SP	27	6	7	14	23	41	−18	25	Relegated to Série B 2002
27	América-MG	27	6	7	14	32	46	−14	25	Relegated to Série B 2002
28	Sport	27	5	4	18	24	46	−22	19	Relegated to Série B 2002

== Top scorers ==
Pos.	Scorer	Club	Goals
1	(Brazil) Romário	Vasco	21
2	(Brazil) Washington	Ponte Preta	18
3	(Brazil) Alex Mineiro	Atlético-PR	17
3	(Brazil) Kléber Pereira	Atlético-PR	17
4	(Brazil) Marques	Atlético Mineiro	16
5	(Brazil) Ricardo Oliveira	Portuguesa	14
6	(Brazil) França	São Paulo	13
6	(Brazil) Magrão	São Caetano	13
