= 2005 Copa Libertadores finals =

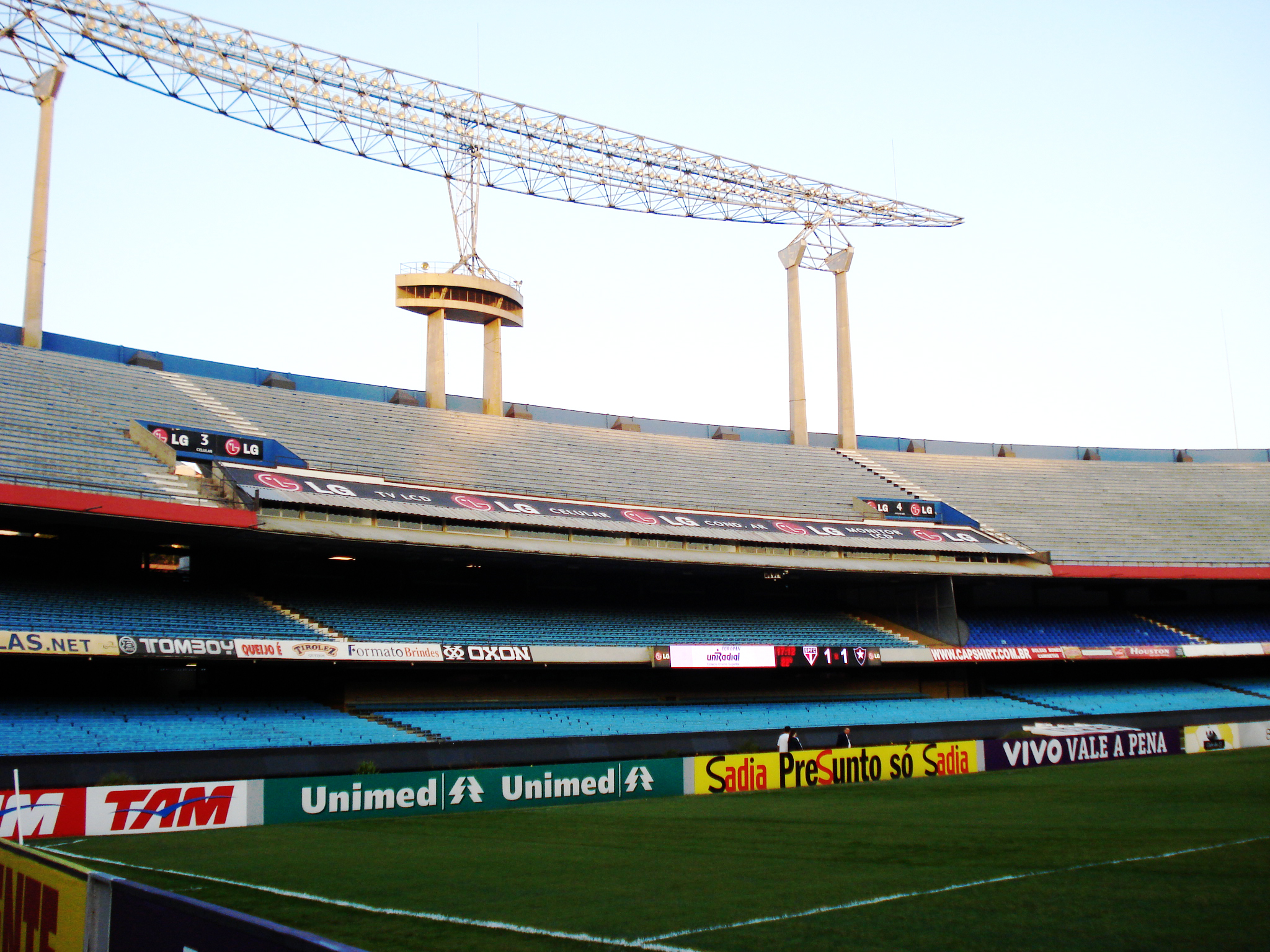
- Event: 2005 Copa Toyota Libertadores
Atlético Paranaense	São Paulo
(Brazil)	(Brazil)
1	5
- on aggregate

First leg
Atlético Paranaense	São Paulo
1	1
- Date: 6 July 2005
- Venue: Estádio Beira-Rio, Porto Alegre
- Referee: Jorge Larrionda

Second leg
São Paulo	Atlético Paranaense
4	0
- Date: 14 July 2005
- Venue: Estádio do Morumbi, São Paulo
- Referee: Horacio Elizondo
- Attendance: 71,986

The 2005 Copa Libertadores finals was a two-legged football match-up to determine the winner of the 2005 Copa Libertadores, the 46th edition of the Copa Libertadores, South America's premier international club football tournament organized by CONMEBOL.

The finals were contested in a two-legged home-and-away format between Brazilian team São Paulo and Brazilian team Athletico Paranaense. The first leg was hosted by Athletico Paranaense at Estádio Beira-Rio in Porto Alegre on 6 July 2005, as its home stadium, Arena da Baixada, did not meet CONMEBOL's minimum capacity requirements for the final. The second leg was hosted by São Paulo at Estádio do Morumbi in São Paulo on 14 July. The winner earned the right to represent CONMEBOL at the 2005 FIFA Club World Championship and to face the winners of the 2005 Copa Sudamericana in the 2006 Recopa Sudamericana.

The first leg ended in a 1–1 draw, while São Paulo won the second leg 4–0 to claim a 5–1 aggregate victory and secure their third Copa Libertadores title, becoming the first Brazilian club to win the competition three times.

== Qualified teams ==
Team	Previous finals appearances (bold indicates winners)
(Brazil) Atlético Paranaense	None
(Brazil) São Paulo	1974, **1992**, **1993**, 1994

== Venues ==
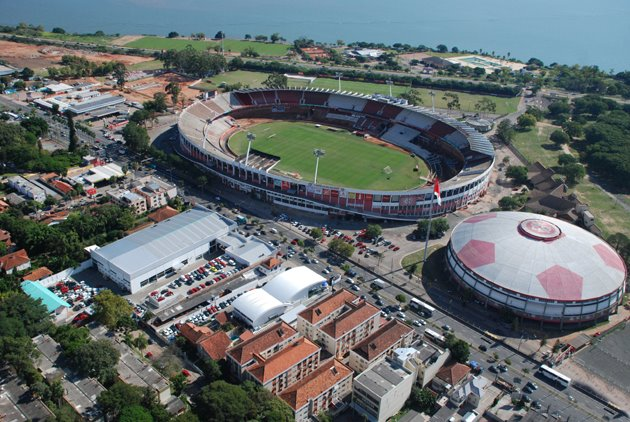
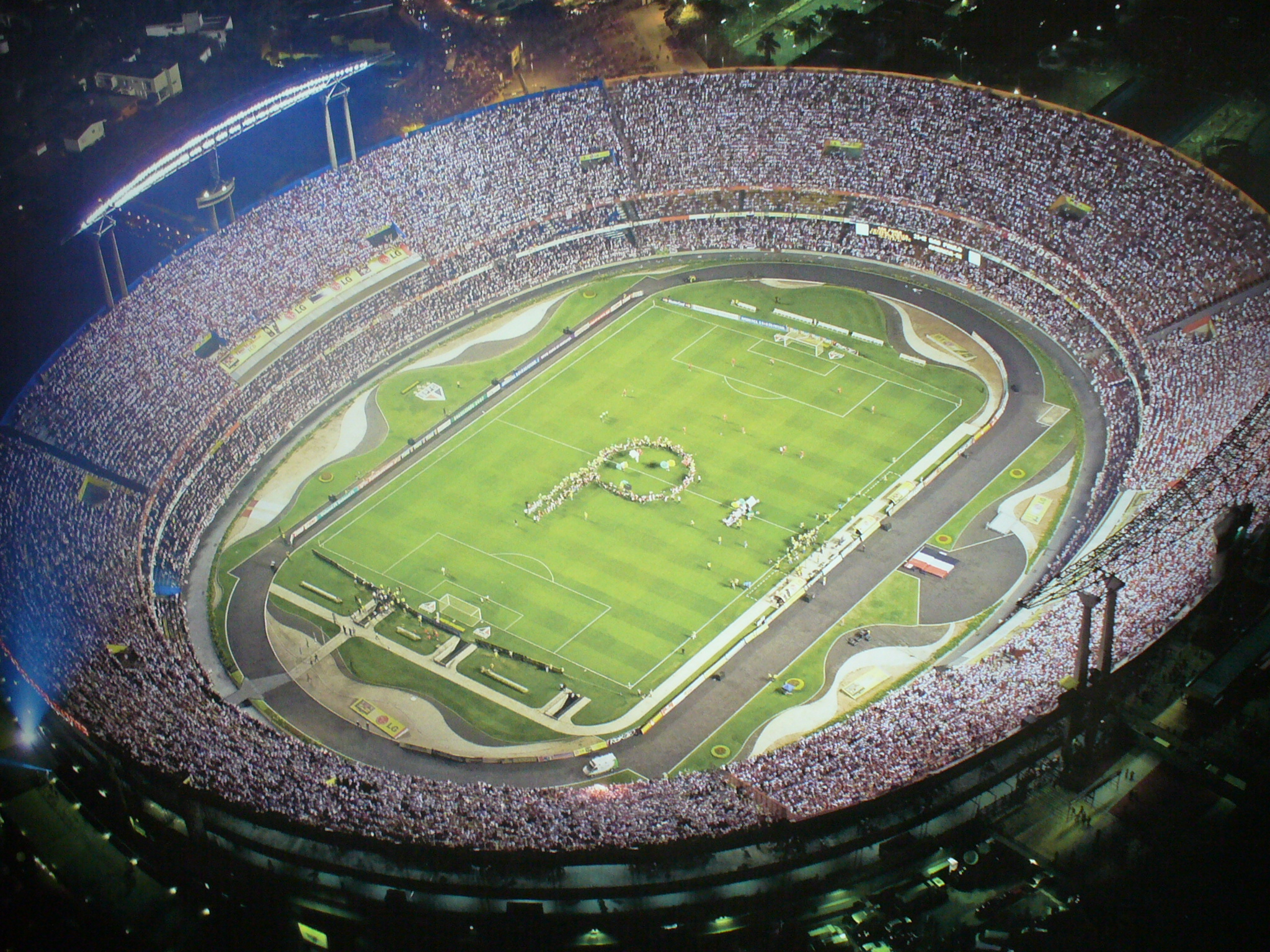
Estadio Beira-Rio (left) and Estadio Morumbi, venues for the series

== Road to the final ==
São Paulo			Atlético Paranaense	
(Brazil) Palmeiras; A **1–0**	Cicinho 59'	**Round of 16**; First leg	(Paraguay) Cerro Porteño; H **2–1**	Lima 30'; Cléo 50'
(Brazil) Palmeiras; H **2–0**	Rogério Ceni (pen.) 81'; Cicinho 89'	Second leg	(Paraguay) Cerro Porteño; A **1–2** (p. 5–4)	Lima 9'
(Mexico) Tigres; H **4–0**	Rogério Ceni 30', 58'; Luizão 39'; Souza 61'	**Quarterfinals**; First leg	(Brazil) Santos; H **3–2**	Evandro 25'; Marcão 40'; Lima 71'
(Mexico) Tigres; A **1–2**	Souza 87'	Second leg	(Brazil) Santos; A **2–0**	Aloísio 16', 52'
(Argentina) River Plate; H **2–0**	Danilo 76'; Rogério Ceni (pen.) 89'	**Semifinals**; First leg	(Mexico) Guadalajara; H **3–0**	Aloísio 22'; Fernandinho 44'; Fabrício 78'
(Argentina) River Plate; A **3–2**	Danilo 11'; Amoroso 59'; Fabão 80'	Second leg	(Mexico) Guadalajara; A **2–2**	Lima 68', 80'

== Final summary ==
=== First leg ===
6 July 2005
21:45 UTC−3

Atlético Paranaense (Brazil)	1–1	(Brazil) São Paulo
Aloísio 14'	Report	Durval 52' (o.g.)

Estádio José Pinheiro Borda (Beira-Rio), Porto Alegre
Referee: Jorge Larrionda (Uruguay)

**Atlético Paranaense**	**São Paulo**

Atlético Paranaense:
GK	1	(Brazil) Diego
DF	2	(Brazil) Jancarlos	(yellow card) 25'	(substituted off) 82'
DF	13	(Brazil) Danilo
DF	14	(Brazil) Durval
DF	5	(Brazil) Marcão (c)	(yellow card) 56'
MF	4	(Brazil) Cocito
MF	7	(Brazil) Alan Bahia
MF	10	(Brazil) Fernandinho		(substituted off) 66'
MF	23	(Brazil) Fabrício
FW	25	(Brazil) Lima
FW	9	(Brazil) Aloísio
Substitutes:
GK	12	(Brazil) Tiago Cardoso
MF	8	(Brazil) Rodrigo Almeida
DF	15	(Brazil) Tiago Vieira
DF	17	(Brazil) André Rocha		(substituted on) 82'
FW	19	(Brazil) Cléo
MF	20	(Brazil) Evandro		(substituted on) 66'
DF	21	(Brazil) Ticão
Manager:
(Brazil) Antônio Lopes

São Paulo:
GK	1	(Brazil) Rogério Ceni (c)
RWB	2	(Brazil) Cicinho
DF	3	(Brazil) Fabão	(yellow card) 82'
DF	5	(Uruguay) Diego Lugano	(yellow card) 68'
DF	25	(Brazil) Alex
LWB	6	(Brazil) Júnior
CM	7	(Brazil) Mineiro
CM	8	(Brazil) Josué
AM	10	(Brazil) Danilo
FW	11	(Brazil) Luizão	(yellow card) 54'
FW	9	(Brazil) Amoroso
Substitutes:
GK	13	(Brazil) Roger
DF	4	(Brazil) Edcarlos
DF	16	(Brazil) Fábio Santos
MF	15	(Brazil) Alê
MF	17	(Brazil) Renan
MF	21	(Brazil) Souza
FW	19	(Brazil) Diego Tardelli
Manager:
(Brazil) Paulo Autuori

Assistant referees:
(Uruguay) Fernando Cresci
(Uruguay) Walter Rial
Fourth official:
(Uruguay) Roberto Silvera

=== Second leg ===
24 July 2005
21:45 UTC−3

São Paulo (Brazil)	4–0	(Brazil) Atlético Paranaense
Amoroso 16'; Fabão 52'; Luizão 70'; Tardelli 89'	Report

Estádio Cícero Pompeu de Toledo (Morumbi), São Paulo
Attendance: 71,986
Referee: Horacio Elizondo (Argentina)

**São Paulo**	**Atlético Paranaense**

São Paulo:
GK	1	(Brazil) Rogério Ceni (c)
RWB	2	(Brazil) Cicinho
DF	3	(Brazil) Fabão	(yellow card) 54'
DF	5	(Uruguay) Diego Lugano	(yellow card) 11'
DF	25	(Brazil) Alex
LWB	6	(Brazil) Júnior		(substituted off) 85'
CM	7	(Brazil) Mineiro
CM	8	(Brazil) Josué
AM	10	(Brazil) Danilo	(yellow card) 55'
FW	11	(Brazil) Luizão		(substituted off) 72'
FW	9	(Brazil) Amoroso		(substituted off) 78'
Substitutes:
GK	13	(Brazil) Roger
DF	4	(Brazil) Edcarlos
DF	16	(Brazil) Fábio Santos		(substituted on) 85'
MF	17	(Brazil) Renan
MF	20	(Brazil) Marco Antônio
MF	21	(Brazil) Souza		(substituted on) 72'
FW	19	(Brazil) Diego Tardelli		(substituted on) 78'
Manager:
(Brazil) Paulo Autuori

Atlético Paranaense:
GK	1	(Brazil) Diego
DF	2	(Brazil) Jancarlos
DF	13	(Brazil) Danilo
DF	14	(Brazil) Durval
DF	5	(Brazil) Marcão (c)		(substituted off) 60'
MF	4	(Brazil) Cocito	(yellow card) 32'
DF	17	(Brazil) André Rocha	(yellow card) 80'	(substituted off) 82'
MF	23	(Brazil) Fabrício	(yellow card) 75'
MF	20	(Brazil) Evandro	(yellow card) 25'
FW	25	(Brazil) Lima		(substituted off) 60'
FW	9	(Brazil) Aloísio
Substitutes:
GK	12	(Brazil) Tiago Cardoso
MF	7	(Brazil) Alan Bahia		(substituted on) 82'
MF	8	(Brazil) Rodrigo Almeida		(substituted on) 60'
MF	10	(Brazil) Fernandinho		(substituted on) 60'
DF	15	(Brazil) Tiago Vieira
FW	19	(Brazil) Cléo
DF	21	(Brazil) Ticão
Manager:
(Brazil) Antônio Lopes

Assistant referees:
(Argentina) Rodolfo Otero
(Argentina) Juan Carlos Rebollo
Fourth official:
(Argentina) Sergio Pezzotta
