= 1997 São Paulo FC season =

São Paulo
1997 season
- Chairman: Fernando Casal de Rey
- Manager: Muricy Ramalho (until April 15); Daryo Pereira
- Campeonato Brasileiro Série A: 12th
- Torneio Rio-São Paulo: Semi-finals
- Campeonato Paulista: Runners-up (in 1998 Copa do Brasil)
- Copa do Brasil: Round of 16
- Supercopa Sudamericana: Runners-up
- Top goalscorer: League: Dodô (21); All: Dodô (54)

The 1997 São Paulo F.C. season details the competitions entered, matches played and teams faced by the São Paulo Futebol Clube in the 1997 season, showing the result in each event. Both friendly and official events are included. São Paulo Futebol Clube is a professional football club based in São Paulo, Brazil. They play in the Campeonato Paulista, São Paulo's state league, and the Campeonato Brasileiro Série A or Brasileirão, Brazil's national league.

== Statistics ==
=== Scorers ===
Position	Nation	Playing position	Name	Torneio Rio-São Paulo	Campeonato Paulista	Copa do Brasil	Campeonato Brasileiro	Supercopa Sudamericana	Others	Total
1	(Brazil)	FW	Dodô	0	19	3	21	7	4	54
2	(Colombia)	FW	Víctor Aristizábal	1	16	1	4	4	1	27
3	(Brazil)	FW	França	0	2	0	3	2	2	9
4	(Brazil)	FW	Adriano	3	2	0	1	0	1	7
5	(Brazil)	MF	Denílson	0	2	2	0	1	0	5
=	(Brazil)	DF	Belletti	0	2	1	1	0	1	5
=	(Brazil)	MF	Marcelinho Paraíba	0	0	0	4	1	0	5
7	(Brazil)	MF	Fabiano	0	0	0	2	1	1	4
=	(Brazil)	MF	Luiz Carlos	0	2	0	0	0	2	4
=	(Brazil)	DF	Serginho	0	3	0	0	0	1	4
8	(Brazil)	DF	Edmílson	0	1	0	1	1	0	3
=	(Brazil)	FW	Marques	0	1	0	0	0	2	3
=	(Brazil)	GK	Rogério Ceni	0	1	0	2	0	0	3
9	(Brazil)	DF	Fábio Aurélio	0	1	0	1	0	0	2
=	(Brazil)	DF	Nem	0	2	0	0	0	0	2
10	(Brazil)	DF	Picon	0	0	0	0	0	1	1
=	(Brazil)	MF	Reinaldo	0	0	0	1	0	0	1
=	(Brazil)	DF	Cláudio	0	1	0	0	0	0	1
=	(Brazil)	FW	Valdir	0	0	0	0	0	1	1
			Own goals	0	0	1	0	3	0	4
			Total	4	55	8	41	20	17	145

=== Overall ===
Games played	79 (4 Torneio Rio-São Paulo, 26 Campeonato Paulista, 4 Copa do Brasil, 25 Campeonato Brasileiro, 10 Supercopa Libertadores, 10 Friendly match)
Games won	31 (0 Torneio Rio-São Paulo, 12 Campeonato Paulista, 2 Copa do Brasil, 8 Campeonato Brasileiro, 5 Supercopa Libertadores, 4 Friendly match)
Games drawn	28 (2 Torneio Rio-São Paulo, 11 Campeonato Paulista, 1 Copa do Brasil, 9 Campeonato Brasileiro, 3 Supercopa Libertadores, 2 Friendly match)
Games lost	20 (2 Torneio Rio-São Paulo, 3 Campeonato Paulista, 1 Copa do Brasil, 8 Campeonato Brasileiro, 2 Supercopa Libertadores, 4 Friendly match)
Goals scored	145
Goals conceded	96
Goal difference	+49
Best result	8–1 (H) v Juventus – Campeonato Paulista – 1997.04.27
Worst result	1–3 (H) v Flamengo – Torneio Rio-São Paulo – 1997.02.01; 1–3 (A) v Bahia – Campeonato Brasileiro – 1997.08.17; 1–3 (H) v Vitória – Friendly match – 1997.11.20
Top scorer	Dodô (54)

Source: São Paulo FC

== Friendlies ==
June 10 International	São Paulo (Brazil)	1–1	(Netherlands) Ajax	São Paulo
	França 81'		Wooter 28'	Stadium: Estádio do Morumbi; Attendance: 7,342; Referee: Oscar Roberto Godói

December 9 International	Unión Española (Chile)	2–1	(Brazil) São Paulo	Santiago
	Gutiérrez 33'; Tapia 58'		Luís Carlos 15'	Stadium: Estadio Santa Laura; Attendance: 2,500; Referee: Mario Sánchez

=== Torneo de Club Hermanos ===
January 14 International	São Paulo (Brazil)	3–1	(Argentina) Boca Juniors	São Paulo
	Valdir Bigode 29'; Aristizábal 83'; Serginho 89'		Kily González 88'	Stadium: Estádio do Morumbi; Attendance: 4,762; Referee: Oscar Roberto Godói

=== Copa dos Campeões Mundiais ===
June 14 Group stage	São Paulo	2–1	Grêmio	Campo Grande
	Dodô 67', 89'		Bordon 58' (o.g.)	Stadium: Morenão; Attendance: 5,371; Referee: Sidrack Marinho

June 17 Group stage	São Paulo	3–0	Santos	Campo Grande
	Dodô 16', 77'; Belletti 90'			Stadium: Morenão; Attendance: 11,958; Referee: Oscar Roberto Godói

June 21 Group stage	São Paulo	2–2	Flamengo	Brasília
	Marques 45', 60'		Iranildo 54'; Maurinho 66'	Stadium: Estádio Mané Garrincha; Attendance: 9,239; Referee: Márcio Rezende de Freitas

July 1 Final	São Paulo	0–1	Flamengo	Brasília
			Iranildo 40'	Stadium: Estádio Mané Garrincha; Attendance: 15,002; Referee: Wilson de Souza Mendonça

=== Festival Brasileiro de Futebol ===
November 20 National	São Paulo	1–3	Vitória	Campo Grande
	Fabiano 63'		Flávio 50'; Uéslei 58'; Petković 84'	Stadium: Morenão; Attendance: 3,409; Referee: Helvécio Zequeto

November 22 National	São Paulo	4–0	Rio de Janeiro	Campo Grande
	França 2'; Picon 23'; Adriano 69'; Luís Carlos 82'			Stadium: Morenão; Attendance: 4,698; Referee: Roberto Colman

November 29 National	São Paulo	0–1	Coritiba	Campo Grande
			Marquinhos 60'	Stadium: Morenão; Attendance: 3,118; Referee: Roberto Colman

== Official competitions ==
=== Torneio Rio-São Paulo ===
January 18 Quarter-final	São Paulo	2–2	Fluminense	São Paulo
	Aristizábal 13'; Adriano 86'		Rôni 18'; Jorge Luiz 82'	Stadium: Morumbi; Attendance: 7,098; Referee: Jorge Travessos

January 23 Quarter-final	Fluminense	1–1 (4–5 p)	São Paulo	Rio de Janeiro
	Rôni 47'		Adriano 51'	Stadium: Maracanã; Attendance: 8,609; Referee: Flávio de Carvalho
	Penalties
	Paulo Roberto (penalty scored); Barata (penalty scored); Guilherme (penalty scored); Jorge Luís (penalty scored); Bruno Reis (penalty missed)		Serginho (penalty scored); Adriano (penalty scored); Catê (penalty scored); Uéslei (penalty scored); Valdir Bigode (penalty scored)

January 28 Semi-final	Flamengo	1–0	São Paulo	Rio de Janeiro
	Romário 39'			Stadium: Maracanã; Attendance: 39,067; Referee: João Paulo de Araújo

February 1 Semi-final	São Paulo	1–3	Flamengo	São Paulo
	Adriano 71'		Sávio 53'; Romário 62', 72'	Stadium: Morumbi; Attendance: 31,507; Referee: Léo Feldman

==== Record ====
Final Position	Points	Matches	Wins	Draws	Losses	Goals For	Goals Away	Win%
4th	2	4	0	2	2	4	7	16%

=== Campeonato Paulista ===
==== First stage ====
===== Matches =====
February 9 1	Portuguesa Santista	1–3	São Paulo	Santos
	Toni 78'		Dodô 7'; Adriano 14'; Cláudio 83'	Stadium: Estádio Ulrico Mursa; Attendance: 12,249; Referee: Carlos Eugênio Simon

February 15 2	União São João	0–2	São Paulo	Araras
			Rogério Ceni 48'; Serginho 53'	Stadium: Estádio Doutor Hermínio Ometto; Attendance: 5,174; Referee: Wilson de Souza Mendonça

February 19 3	São Paulo	5–1	Rio Branco	São Paulo
	Nem 18'; Serginho 26'; Dodô 58'; Denílson 68'; França 81'		Charles 22'	Stadium: Morumbi; Attendance: 3,619; Referee: Jorge dos Santos Travassos

February 23 4	Corinthians	2–2	São Paulo	São Paulo
	Túlio 10', 34'		Dodô 13'; França 90'	Stadium: Morumbi; Attendance: 31,444; Referee: Edílson Pereira de Carvalho

February 27 5	São Paulo	0–0	Internacional	São Paulo
				Stadium: Morumbi; Attendance: 4,480; Referee: Oscar Roberto de Godói

March 2 6	Mogi Mirim	1–1	São Paulo	Mogi Mirim
	Lélis 69'		Aristizábal 19'	Stadium: Wilson Fernandes; Attendance: 11,652; Referee: Alfredo dos Santos Loebling

March 5 7	São Paulo	2–2	Araçatuba	São Paulo
	Aristizábal 2'; Belletti 62'		Alexandre 25'; Itamar 63'	Stadium: Morumbi; Attendance: 2,491; Referee: Carlos Jacques Rodrigues Magno

March 8 8	Botafogo	1–1	São Paulo	Ribeirão Preto
	Pichetti 6'		Marques 51'	Stadium: Francisco de Palma Travassos; Attendance: 8,118; Referee: João Paulo Araújo

March 16 9	São Paulo	1–1	Santos	São Paulo
	Dodô 49'		Marcos Assunção 77'	Stadium: Morumbi; Attendance: 26,425; Referee: José Mocellin

March 19 10	Juventus	1–2	São Paulo	São Paulo
	Jajá 84'		Denílson 6'; Aristizábal 10'	Stadium: Ícaro de Castro Mello; Attendance: 3,743; Referee: Julio Matto

March 22 11	São Paulo	1–0	América	São Paulo
	Serginho 60'			Stadium: Morumbi; Attendance: 6,035; Referee: Sálvio Spínola Fagundes Filho

March 29 12	Palmeiras	1–0	São Paulo	São Paulo
	Viola 43'			Stadium: Morumbi; Attendance: 23,729; Referee: Claude Colombo

April 5 13	São Paulo	0–0	São José	São Paulo
				Stadium: Morumbi; Attendance: 4,114; Referee: Cláudio Vinícius Cerdeira

April 10 14	Portuguesa	1–0	São Paulo	São Paulo
	Moreno 72'			Stadium: Canindé; Attendance: 5,310; Referee: Julio Matto

April 13 15	São Paulo	3–3	Guarani	São Paulo
	Dodô 13', 58'; Adriano 90'		Aílton 52', 71', 84'	Stadium: Morumbi; Attendance: 3,408; Referee: Flávio de Carvalho

April 20 16	São Paulo	2–0	Botafogo	São Paulo
	Aristizábal 31'; Nem 69'			Stadium: Morumbi; Attendance: 3,532; Referee: Cláudio Vinícius Cerdeira

April 23 17	Santos	2–2	São Paulo	Santos
	Ânderson 29'; Caíco 42'		Dodô 21', 73'	Stadium: Vila Belmiro; Attendance: 19,815; Referee: Sidrack Marinho dos Santos

April 27 18	São Paulo	8–1	Juventus	São Paulo
	Dodô 9', 76', 85'; Aristizábal 32', 50', 59'; Belletti 80'; Luís Carlos 88'		Denílson 28'	Stadium: Morumbi; Attendance: 4,756; Referee: Oscar Roberto de Godói

May 1 19	América	2–5	São Paulo	São José do Rio Preto
	Wallace 38'; Marcelo Sergipano 89'		Edmílson 3'; Dodô 14', 73', 87'; Aristizábal 90'	Stadium: Benedito Teixeira; Attendance: 11,838; Referee: Léo Feldman

May 3 20	São Paulo	4–2	Palmeiras	São Paulo
	Dodô 39', 74'; Aristizábal 67'; Luís Carlos 81'		Djalminha 36'; Marquinhos 86'	Stadium: Pacaembu; Attendance: 15,801; Referee: Flávio de Carvalho

May 11 21	São José	1–1	São Paulo	São José dos Campos
	Jean Carlo 64'		Aristizábal 45'	Stadium: Martins Pereira; Attendance: 19,000; Referee: Edílson Pereira de Carvalho

May 14 22	São Paulo	5–1	Portuguesa	São Paulo
	Aristizábal 3', 59', 85'; Dodô 38', 68'		Augusto 12'	Stadium: Morumbi; Attendance: 5,471; Referee: Carlos Eugênio Simon

May 18 23	Guarani	2–0	São Paulo	Campinas
	Gilson Batata 45'; Paulo Isidoro 65'			Stadium: Estádio Brinco de Ouro; Attendance: 8,117; Referee: Antônio Cláudio Perin

==== Second round ====
===== Matches =====
May 25	Palmeiras	1–4	São Paulo	São Paulo
	Roque Júnior 90'		Aristizábal 24', 60', 77'; Dodô 69'	Stadium: Morumbi; Attendance: 35,556; Referee: Cláudio Vinícius Cerdeira

May 31	São Paulo	1–0	Santos	São Paulo
	Dodô 81'			Stadium: Pacaembu; Attendance: 30,030; Referee: Hellmut Krug

June 5	São Paulo	1–1	Corinthians	São Paulo
	Fábio Aurélio 46'		André Luiz 45'	Stadium: Morumbi; Attendance: 60,000; Referee: Sándor Puhl

==== Record ====
Final Position	Points	Matches	Wins	Draws	Losses	Goals For	Goals Away	Win%
2nd	47	26	12	11	3	56	28	60%

=== Copa do Brasil ===
==== Round of 32 ====
March 11 1	Vila Nova	2–3	São Paulo	Goiânia
	Moisés 17'; Luciano 61'		Denílson 16'; Belletti 56'; Aristizábal 60'	Stadium: Serra Dourada; Attendance: 16,058; Referee: Luciano Almeida

March 25 2	São Paulo	2–0	Vila Nova	São Paulo
	Batista 21' (o.g.); Dodô 50'			Stadium: Morumbi; Attendance: 1,931; Referee: Getúlio Barbosa

==== Eightfinals ====
April 3 1	Vitória	2–1	São Paulo	Salvador
	Chiquinho 14', 17'		Denílson 78'	Stadium: Barradão; Attendance: 16,061; Referee: Alberto de Carvalho

April 8 2	São Paulo	2–2	Vitória	São Paulo
	Dodô 65', 68'		Agnaldo 6', 50'	Stadium: Morumbi; Attendance: 6,914; Referee: Carlos Elias Pimentel

==== Record ====
Final Position	Points	Matches	Wins	Draws	Losses	Goals For	Goals Away	Win%
13th	7	4	2	1	1	8	6	58%

=== Campeonato Brasileiro ===
==== First phase ====
Pos	Team	Pld	W	D	L	GF	GA	GD	Pts
10	Botafogo	25	8	10	7	32	32	0	34
11	Sport	25	9	6	10	34	32	+2	33
12	São Paulo	25	8	9	8	41	32	+9	33
13	Paraná	25	8	8	9	30	30	0	32
14	Grêmio	25	7	10	8	34	47	−13	31

Source: https://rsssfbrasil.com/tablesae/br1997.htm

===== Matches =====
July 5	Grêmio	0–0	São Paulo	Porto Alegre
				Stadium: Olímpico; Attendance: 10,731; Referee: Carlos Jacques Rodrigues Magno

July 10	São Paulo	1–1	Bragantino	São Paulo
	Dodô 38'		Paulinho 58'	Stadium: Morumbi; Attendance: 2,022; Referee: Silas Santana

July 16	Cruzeiro	0–5	São Paulo	Belo Horizonte
			Dodô 33', 38', 43', 50', 54'	Stadium: Mineirão; Attendance: 9,224; Referee: Francisco Dacildo Mourão Albuquerque

July 20	São Paulo	2–1	Fluminense	São Paulo
	Fabiano 8'; Dodô 29'		Roni 27'	Stadium: Morumbi; Attendance: 13,968; Referee: César Gilberto Pastro

July 23	Vasco da Gama	2–1	São Paulo	Rio de Janeiro
	Evair 69'; Pedrinho 89'		Dodô 2'	Stadium: São Januário; Attendance: 3,371; Referee: Sidrack Marinho dos Santos

July 30	Criciúma	2–1	São Paulo	Criciúma
	Alex 14'; Marcão 27'		Belletti 65'	Stadium: Heriberto Hulse; Attendance: 7,390; Referee: Antônio Pereira da Silva

August 3	São Paulo	1–1	Internacional	São Paulo
	Dodô 76'		Marcelo 67'	Stadium: Morumbi; Attendance: 9,083; Referee: Marco Antônio da Cunha

August 10	Goiás	1–2	São Paulo	Goiânia
	Aloísio 23'		Reinaldo 31'; França 40'	Stadium: Serra Dourada; Attendance: 14,454; Referee: Álvaro Augusto de Azevedo Quelhas

August 17	Bahia	3–1	São Paulo	Salvador
	Edmundo 15', 46'; Guga 43'		Edmílson 38'	Stadium: Fonte Nova; Attendance: 28,067; Referee: Carlos Eugênio Simon

August 20	São Paulo	0–2	Atlético Mineiro	São Paulo
			Jorginho 77'; Nilo 84'	Stadium: Morumbi; Attendance: 4,493; Referee: Jorge dos Santos Travassos

August 23	Atlético Paranaense	1–1	São Paulo	Curitiba
	Pachequinho 1'		Dodô 14'	Stadium: Durival de Britto; Attendance: 5,841; Referee: Cláudio Vinícius Cerdeira

August 31	Corinthians	0–1	São Paulo	São Paulo
			Dodô 13'	Stadium: Pacaembu; Attendance: 15,543; Referee: Márcio Rezende de Freitas

September 7	São Paulo	0–2	Palmeiras	São Paulo
			Zinho 16'; Oséas 38'	Stadium: Morumbi; Attendance: 17,343; Referee: Antônio Pereira da Silva

September 11	Portuguesa	2–1	São Paulo	São Paulo
	César 58'; Leandro 88'		Fabiano 84'	Stadium: Canindé; Attendance: 5,068; Referee: Sidrack Marinho dos Santos

September 13	São Paulo	2–2	Botafogo	São Paulo
	Rogério Ceni 4'; Dodô 40'		Bentinho 34'; Reinaldo 90'	Stadium: Morumbi; Attendance: 2,679; Referee: Dalmo Bozzano

September 17	Santos	2–1	São Paulo	Santos
	Jean 38'; Macedo 55'		Aristizábal 90'	Stadium: Vila Belmiro; Attendance: 19,046; Referee: Ubiraci Damásio de Oliveira

September 20	São Paulo	3–1	Vitória	São Paulo
	Aristizábal; França; Fábio Aurélio		Ueslei	Stadium: Morumbi; Attendance: 1,830; Referee: Márcio Rezende de Freitas

September 27	São Paulo	0–0	Juventude	São Paulo
				Stadium: Morumbi; Attendance: 5,440; Referee: Jorge dos Santos Travassos

October 1	Guarani	0–0	São Paulo	Campinas
				Stadium: Brinco de Ouro; Attendance: 4,730; Referee: Francisco Dacildo Mourão Albuquerque

October 5	São Paulo	4–2	Sport	São Paulo
	Marcelinho Paraíba 49', 55'; Aristizábal 64', 86'		Leonardo 20'; Didi 52'	Stadium: Morumbi; Attendance: 5,153; Referee: Sidrack Marinho dos Santos

October 11	Flamengo	1–0	São Paulo	Rio de Janeiro
	Athirson 69'			Stadium: Maracanã; Attendance: 17,228; Referee: Wilson de Souza Mendonça

October 19	São Paulo	0–0	Coritiba	São Paulo
				Stadium: Morumbi; Attendance: 5,345; Referee: Cláudio Vinícius Cerdeira

October 26	São Paulo	7–1	União São João	São Paulo
	Dodô 40', 67', 75', 79', 82'; Marcelinho Paraíba 54', 59'		Herberte 42'	Stadium: Morumbi; Attendance: 1,325; Referee: Dalmo Bozzano

November 2	América-RN	1–3	São Paulo	Natal
	Richardson 26'		Dodô 13', 32', 58'	Stadium: Machadão; Attendance: 22,308; Referee: Cláudio Vinícius Cerdeira

November 9	São Paulo	4–4	Paraná	São Paulo
	Dodô 56'; Adriano 59'; Rogério Ceni 66'; França 88'		Osmar 1'; Vital 43'; Sidney 45' (o.g.); Bira 68'	Stadium: Morumbi; Attendance: 1,991; Referee: Giuliano Bozzano

==== Record ====
Final Position	Points	Matches	Wins	Draws	Losses	Goals For	Goals Away	Win%
12th	33	25	8	9	8	41	32	44%

=== Supercopa Sudamericana ===
August 26 Group stage	Flamengo (Brazil)	3–2	(Brazil) São Paulo	Rio de Janeiro
	Fábio Baiano 51'; Renato Gaúcho 64'; Sávio 75'		Denílson 53'; França 84'	Stadium: Estádio do Maracanã; Attendance: 3,805; Referee: Sidrack Marinho

September 4 Group stage	São Paulo (Brazil)	5–1	(Argentina) Vélez Sarsfield	São Paulo
	Marcelinho 24'; Dodô 29', 37', 77'; França 84'		Husaín 85'	Stadium: Estádio do Morumbi; Attendance: 2,271; Referee: Eduardo Gamboa

September 23 Group stage	Olimpia (Paraguay)	0–0	(Brazil) São Paulo	Asunción
				Stadium: Estadio Defensores del Chaco; Attendance: 8,000; Referee: Oscar Ruíz

October 14 Group stage	São Paulo (Brazil)	1–0	(Brazil) Flamengo	São Paulo
	Aristizábal 34'			Stadium: Estádio do Morumbi; Attendance: 3,488; Referee: Antônio Pereira da Silva

October 23 Group stage	Vélez Sarsfield (Argentina)	3–3	(Brazil) São Paulo	Buenos Aires
	Martín Posse 37'; Chilavert 58' (pen.); Husaín 71'		Aristizábal 4'; Pellegrino 26' (o.g.); Dodô 43'	Stadium: Estadio José Amalfitani; Attendance: 3,700; Referee: Jorge Nieves

October 29 Group stage	São Paulo (Brazil)	4–1	(Paraguay) Olimpia	São Paulo
	Caballero 13' (o.g.); Celaya 35' (o.g.); Edmílson 37'; Aristizábal 41'		González 58'	Stadium: Estádio do Morumbi; Attendance: 8,547; Referee: Alberto Tejada

November 6 Semi-final	São Paulo (Brazil)	3–1	(Chile) Colo-Colo	São Paulo
	Fabiano 47'; Aristizábal 55'; Dodô 64'		Basay 87'	Stadium: Estádio do Morumbi; Attendance: 20,803; Referee: Jorge Nieves

November 27 Semi-final	Colo-Colo (Chile)	0–1	(Brazil) São Paulo	Santiago
			Dodô 89'	Stadium: Estadio Monumental; Attendance: 25,000; Referee: Byron Moreno

December 4 Final	São Paulo (Brazil)	0–0	(Argentina) River Plate	São Paulo
				Stadium: Estádio do Morumbi; Attendance: 45,589; Referee: Mario Sánchez

December 17 Final	River Plate (Argentina)	2–1	(Brazil) São Paulo	Buenos Aires
	Salas 46', 71'		Dodô 57'	Stadium: Monumental de Núñez; Attendance: 59,181; Referee: Ubaldo Aquino

==== Record ====
Final Position	Points	Matches	Wins	Draws	Losses	Goals For	Goals Away	Win%
2nd	18	10	5	3	2	20	11	60%
