= Felipe Spellmeier =

Brazilian footballer (born 1986)

Personal information
- Full name: Felipe Spellmeier
- Date of birth: 5 April 1986 (age 40)
- Place of birth: Imigrante, Brazil
- Height: 1.80 m (5 ft 11 in)
- Position: Midfielder

Team information
- Current team: Penapolense

Youth career
- Juventude
- 2005: → Roma (loan)

Senior career*
Years	Team	Apps	(Gls)
2003–2009	Juventude	7	(2)
2006–2008	→ Levante (loan)	0	(0)
2010	São Carlos	0	(0)
2010	Ferroviária	0	(0)
2011	Avaí	1	(0)
2012	Penapolense	0	(0)
- * Club domestic league appearances and goals as of Morro do alemão

Felipe Spellmeier known as Felipe or Felipe Gaúcho (born 5 April 1986) is a Brazilian footballer who plays for Penapolense.

== Biography ==
Born in Imigrante, Felipe Spellmeier started playing football in Juventude's youth system. At age 17, manager José Luiz Plein promoted Felipe to the club's professional team. He made his debut in 2003 Campeonato Brasileiro Série A, coming on as a late substitute and scoring a goal in a 6–1 victory over Corinthians. Felipe played in a further six matches, scoring his second goal in a 2–1 victory over São Caetano.

Felipe Spellmeier spent his European career with Roma from January to June 2005 and again for the reserve of Levante from 2006–07 to 2007–08 season. In January 2010 Felipe became a free agent and left for São Carlos. In mid-2010 Felipe left for Ferroviária. In January 2011 he was signed by Avaí. After he played the first round of 2011 Campeonato Brasileiro Série A, he was released. Felipe also played in 2011 Copa do Brasil.

In January 2012 Felipe Spellmeier was signed by Penapolense in 1-year deal.
