= Picerni =

Picerni is an Italian surname. Notable people with the surname include:

- Jair Picerni (born 1944), Brazilian footballer and manager
- Paul Picerni (1922–2011), American actor
