= Rogério Corrêa =

Rogério Corrêa may refer to:

- Rogério Corrêa (footballer, born 1979), full name Rogério Corrêa de Oliveira, Brazilian football former defender and current manager
- Rogério Corrêa (footballer, born 1981), full name Rogério de Albuquerque Corrêa, Brazilian football former defender and current manager
