= Silvio Luiz =

Silvio Luiz may refer to:

- Silvio Luiz (commentator) (born 1934), Brazilian commentator and presenter
- Silvio Luiz (footballer) (born 1977), Brazilian footballer
