= Top Chef Brasil season 2 =

Top Chef Brasil
- Season 2
- Hosted by: Felipe Bronze
- Judges: Felipe Bronze; Ailin Aleixo; Emmanuel Bassoleil
- No. of contestants: 14
- Winner: Luciana Berry
- No. of episodes: 12

Release
- Original network: RecordTV
- Original release: July 15 – October 2, 2020

Season chronology
- ← Previous; Season 1 Next → Season 3

The second season of Top Chef Brasil premiered on Wednesday, July 15, 2020, at 10:3 p.m. (BRT / AMT) on RecordTV.

On March 17, 2020, due to the COVID-19 pandemic, RecordTV announced that filming had been suspended midway through episode 5, with plans to resume once it was safe to do so. Shooting resumed on July 25, under social distancing measures and regular testing, until August 9, 2020.

== Contestants ==
Name	Age	Hometown	Current residence	Result
Matheus Emerick	26	Brasília	Florianópolis	Eliminated 1st
Rafael Terrassi	30	Bauru	Curitiba	Eliminated 2nd
Beatriz Buéssio	32	São Paulo	Santos	Withdrew
Kaká Silva	54	Brasília	Brasília	Eliminated 3rd
Marê Araújo	31	Ituiutaba	Brasília	Eliminated 4th
Taty Albano	37	Salvador	Salvador	Eliminated 5th
Lucas Ryu	23	Rinópolis	São Paulo	Eliminated 6th
Natália Rios	32	São Paulo	São Paulo	Eliminated 7th
Michele Petenzi	33	Ponte San Pietro, Italy	Rio de Janeiro	Eliminated 8th
Maiara Marinho	30	Ribeirão Pires	São Paulo	Eliminated 9th
Bruno Alves	37	Rio de Janeiro	São Paulo	Eliminated 10th
César Scolari	39	Alvorada do Sul	São Paulo	Third place
Lara Carolina	25	Macaé	São Paulo	Runner-up
Luciana Berry	39	Salvador	London, UK	Winner

== Contestant progress ==
Episode #		1	2	3	4	5^{1}	6	7	8	9	10	11^{2}	12
Quickfire challenge winner(s)		Beatriz; César; Kaká; Maiara; Michele; Natália; Taty	Bruno; Lara; Lucas; Michele	César; Natália	Bruno; César; Lucas; Luciana; Natália	César; Lara; Lucas; Maiara; Marê	Bruno; Luciana; Michele; Natália; Taty	Bruno; Lara; Michele	Bruno; Lara; Natália; Michele	Bruno; Lara; Michele	Luciana; Maiara	Luciana	—N/a
Contestant		Elimination challenge results											
1	Luciana	IN	IN	IN	IMM	—N/a	IMM	—N/a	HIGH	LOW	IMM	IMM	WINNER
2	Lara	IN	IMM	HIGH	IN	IMM	LOW	IMM	IMM	IMM	LOW	IN	OUT
3	César	IMM	WIN	IMM	IMM	IMM	IN	WIN	WIN	—N/a	LOW	IN	OUT
4	Bruno	IN	IMM	LOW	IMM	—N/a	IMM	IMM	IMM	IMM	WIN	OUT	
5	Maiara	IMM	IN	WIN	IN	IMM	WIN	—N/a	LOW	WIN	IMM	OUT	
6	Michele	IMM	IMM	IN	IN	—N/a	IMM	IMM	IMM	IMM	OUT		
7	Natália	IMM	HIGH	IMM	IMM	—N/a	IMM	HIGH	IMM	OUT			
8	Lucas	WIN	IMM	HIGH	IMM	IMM	IN	HIGH	OUT				
9	Taty	IMM	IN	WIN	LOW	—N/a	IMM	OUT					
10	Marê	LOW	LOW	IN	WIN	IMM	OUT						
11	Kaká	IMM	IN	IN	OUT								
12	Beatriz	IMM	LOW	WD									
13	Rafael	IN	OUT										
14	Matheus	OUT											

- ^Note 1 : The elimination challenge was cancelled as filming was suspended due to the COVID-19 pandemic.
- ^Note 2 : Maiara lost the sudden death quickfire challenge and was eliminated.

Key

- Winner
- Runner-up
- Quickfire challenge immunity
- Elimination challenge winner(s)
- Elimination challenge top entry
- Elimination challenge bottom entry
- Withdrew
- Eliminated

== Main guest appearances ==
Episode 1

- Chef Giovanna Perrone, season 1 winner

Episode 2

- Chef Paul Cho
- Chef Rodrigo Oliveira

Episode 3

- Chef Murakami

Episode 4

- Chef Luisa Abram

Episode 5

- Xuxa Meneghel

Episode 7

- Chef Fred Caffarena

== Ratings and reception ==
=== Brazilian ratings ===
All numbers are in points and provided by Kantar Ibope Media.

Episode	Title	Air date	Timeslot (BRT)	SP viewers (in points)	Source
1	Top 14	July 15, 2020	Wednesday 10:30 p.m.	3.4	
2	Top 13	July 22, 2020	Wednesday 10:30 p.m.	4.9	
3	Top 12	July 29, 2020	Wednesday 10:30 p.m.	5.4	
4	Top 11	August 5, 2020	Wednesday 10:30 p.m.	4.6	
5	Top 10	August 12, 2020	Wednesday 10:30 p.m.	5.9	
6	Top 10 Redux	August 19, 2020	Wednesday 10:30 p.m.	4.6	
7	Top 9	August 26, 2020	Wednesday 10:30 p.m.	5.4	
8	Top 8	September 2, 2020	Wednesday 10:30 p.m.	5.6	
9	Top 7	September 11, 2020	Friday 11:00 p.m.	6.3	
10	Top 6	September 18, 2020	Friday 11:00 p.m.	5.8	
11	Top 5	September 25, 2020	Friday 11:00 p.m.	6.5	
12	Winner announced	October 2, 2020	Friday 11:00 p.m.	7.6	

- In 2020, each point represents 260.558 households in 15 market cities in Brazil (74.987 households in São Paulo).
