= Top Chef Brasil =

- Genre: Reality competition Cooking show
- Presented by: Felipe Bronze
- Judges: Felipe Bronze; Ailin Aleixo; Emmanuel Bassoleil; Janaína Torres Rueda
- Country of origin: Brazil
- Original language: Portuguese
- No. of seasons: 4
- No. of episodes: 53

Production
- Camera setup: Multiple-camera
- Running time: 60–90 minutes
- Production company: Floresta Productions

Original release
- Network: RecordTV
- Release: April 3, 2019 – September 14, 2023

Related
- Top Chef

Top Chef Brasil is a Brazilian cooking competition television series based on the American television series Top Chef. The series premiered on Wednesday, April 3, 2019 at 10:30 / 9:30 p.m. (BRT / AMT) on RecordTV.

The winner is awarded a R$300.000 cash prize and the title of Top Chef.

== Series overview ==
Season	Winner	Runner-up	Host	Judges
1	Giovanna Perrone	Gabriel Vidolin	Felipe Bronze	Felipe Bronze; Ailin Aleixo; Emmanuel Bassoleil
2	Luciana Berry	Lara Carolina	Felipe Bronze	Felipe Bronze; Ailin Aleixo; Emmanuel Bassoleil
3	Giovanni Renê	Cadu Evangelisti	Felipe Bronze	Felipe Bronze; Ailin Aleixo; Emmanuel Bassoleil
4	Henrique Ide	Victoria Teles	Felipe Bronze	Felipe Bronze; Emmanuel Bassoleil; Janaína Torres Rueda

== Ratings and reception ==
=== Brazilian ratings ===
All numbers are in points and provided by Kantar Ibope Media.

Season	Timeslot (BRT)	Premiered		Ended		TV season	SP viewers (in points)	Source
Season	Timeslot (BRT)	Date	Viewers (in points)	Date	Viewers (in points)	TV season	SP viewers (in points)	Source
1	Wednesday 10:30 p.m. Wednesday 10:45 p.m.	April 3, 2019	6.6	June 26, 2019	5.6	2019	5.71	
2	Wednesday 10:30 p.m. Friday 11:00 p.m.	July 15, 2020	3.4	October 2, 2020	7.6	2020	5.50	
3	Friday 11:00 p.m.	September 24, 2021	5.4	December 10, 2021	4.9	2021	4.50	
4	Wednesday 10:30 p.m. Thursday 10:30 p.m.	July 26, 2023	4.2	September 14, 2023	2.8	2023	3.52	

- Each point represents a specific number of households in São Paulo.
  - 2019: 73.015 households.
  - 2020: 74.987 households.
  - 2021: 76.577 households.
  - 2023: 76.953 households.
