= Lima (footballer, born 1981) =

Brazilian footballer

Personal information
- Full name: Aparecido Francisco de Lima
- Date of birth: November 2, 1981 (age 44)
- Place of birth: Alvorada do Sul, Brazil
- Height: 1.90 m (6 ft 3 in)
- Position: Striker

Team information
- Current team: ASA

Senior career*
Years	Team	Apps	(Gls)
2000–2003	Coritiba	-	(-)
2004	Cruzeiro	-	(-)
2004–2005	→ Braga (loan)	-	(-)
2005	→ Atlético Paranaense (loan)	-	(-)
2005–2007	Al-Ittihad Jeddah	-	(-)
2006	→ São Paulo (loan)	4	(0)
2006	→ Botafogo (loan)	11	(2)
2007	São Caetano	-	(-)
2008	Corinthians	7	(1)
2008	Figueirense	-	(-)
2009	Atlético Paranaense	-	(-)
2009	Al-Shamal	12	(4)
2010	Bahia	15	(5)
2010	Paraná	5	(0)
2011	Caxias	21	(11)
2012	Ceará	5	(0)
2012–2013	Lobos BUAP	18	(6)
2013	ABC	1	(0)
2014–	ASA	19	(13)
- * Club domestic league appearances and goals

Aparecido Francisco de Lima (born November 2, 1981), or simply Lima , is a striker player from Brazil. He currently plays for ASA.

Lima previously played in the Campeonato Brasileiro for Coritiba, Cruzeiro, Atlético Paranaense, São Paulo, Botafogo and Figueirense. He also had a brief stint in Portugal with Braga.
