= Top Chef Brasil season 4 =

Top Chef Brasil
- Season 4
- Hosted by: Felipe Bronze
- Judges: Felipe Bronze; Emmanuel Bassoleil; Janaína Torres Rueda
- No. of contestants: 12
- No. of episodes: 16

Release
- Original network: RecordTV
- Original release: July 26 – September 14, 2023

Season chronology
- ← Previous; Season 3

The fourth season of Top Chef Brasil premiered on Wednesday, July 26, 2023, at 10:30 / 9:30 p.m. (BRT / AMT) on RecordTV. Judge Ailin Aleixo left the show after three seasons and was replaced by Janaína Torres Rueda.

== Contestants ==
Name	Age	Hometown	Result
Rodolfo Bondezan	38	Itanhaém	Eliminated 1st
Bárbara Mattos	32	Rio de Janeiro	Eliminated 2nd
Arturo Baéz	Returned on episode 11		Eliminated 3rd
Nara Amaral	54	Salvador	Eliminated 4th
Nanda Crioula	26	Porto Ferreira	Eliminated 5th
Rubens Gonçalo	37	Rio de Janeiro	Eliminated 6th
Eduardo Moraes	26	Salvador	Eliminated 7th
Jamile "Jajá" Massahud	38	Lavras	Eliminated 8th
Gabriel Gialluisi	27	São Paulo	Eliminated 9th
Lorena Lacava	40	Guarapuava	Eliminated 10th
Arturo Baéz	38	Belém	Third place
Victoria Teles	26	Rio de Janeiro	Runner-up
Henrique Ide	29	Jundiaí	Winner

== Contestant progress ==
Week #		1	2	3	4	5	6	7	8	
Episode #		1/2	3/4	5/6	7/8	9/10	11/12	13/14	15	16
Quickfire challenge winner(s)		Nara	Gabriel; Rubens; Victoria	Henrique; Nanda; Victoria	Gabriel; ~~Henrique~~; Rubens; Victoria	Gabriel; Henrique; Jajá	Arturo; Henrique; Lorena; ~~Nara~~; Victoria	Henrique; Victoria	Arturo; Henrique	—N/a
Contestant		Elimination challenge results								
1	Henrique	HIGH	IMM	IMM	WIN	IMM	IMM	IMM	IMM	WINNER
2	Victoria	HIGH	IMM	IMM	IMM	WIN	IMM	IMM	WIN	OUT
3	Arturo	IMM	OUT				IMM	WIN	IMM	OUT
4	Lorena	WIN	LOW	HIGH	LOW	IN	IMM	LOW	OUT	
5	Gabriel	LOW	IMM	IN	IMM	IMM	WIN	OUT		
6	Jajá	IMM	HIGH	IN	HIGH	IMM	OUT			
7	Eduardo	IN	LOW	LOW	LOW	IN	OUT			
8	Rubens	HIGH	IMM	WIN	IMM	OUT	OUT			
9	Nanda	IMM	IN	IMM	OUT		OUT			
10	Nara	IMM	WIN	OUT			OUT			
11	Bárbara	OUT								
12	Rodolfo	OUT								

Key

- Winner
- Runner-up
- Quickfire challenge immunity
- Elimination challenge winner(s)
- Elimination challenge top entry
- Elimination challenge bottom entry
- Eliminated

== Guest appearances ==
Episode 3
- Chef Fred Caffarena

Episode 4

- Chef Salvatore Loi

Episode 6

- Chef Stefan Weitbrecht

Episode 8

- Chef Oscar Bosch
Episode 10
- Chef Vivianne Wakuda

Episode 12

- Brewmaster Roberto Tempel

Episode 14

- Chef Alê Costa

== Ratings and reception ==
=== Brazilian ratings ===
All numbers are in points and provided by Kantar Ibope Media.

Episode	Air date	Timeslot (BRT)	SP viewers (in points)	Source
1	July 26, 2023	Wednesday 10:30 p.m.	4.2	
2	July 27, 2023	Thursday 10:30 p.m.	4.0	
3	August 2, 2023	Wednesday 10:30 p.m.	3.6	
4	August 3, 2023	Thursday 10:30 p.m.	3.1	
5	August 9, 2023	Wednesday 10:30 p.m.	3.8	
6	August 10, 2023	Thursday 10:30 p.m.	3.6	
7	August 16, 2023	Wednesday 10:30 p.m.	3.8	
8	August 17, 2023	Thursday 10:30 p.m.	3.1	
9	August 23, 2023	Wednesday 10:30 p.m.	3.7	
10	August 24, 2023	Thursday 10:30 p.m.	3.3	
11	August 30, 2023	Wednesday 10:30 p.m.	4.4	
12	August 31, 2023	Thursday 10:30 p.m.	3.2	
13	September 6, 2023	Wednesday 10:30 p.m.	3.3	
14	September 7, 2023	Thursday 10:30 p.m.	2.9	
15	September 13, 2023	Wednesday 10:30 p.m.	3.8	
16	September 14, 2023	Thursday 10:30 p.m.	2.8	

- In 2023, each point represents 268.083 households in 15 market cities in Brazil (76.953 households in São Paulo).
