= Imigrante =

Municipality of Rio Grande do Sul, Brazil

- Municipality
- Coat of arms

- Geograpichal divisions of Rio Grande do Sul. Imigrante is highlighted in red.
- Coordinates: 29°21′18″S 51°46′37″W
- Country: Brazil
- State: Rio Grande do Sul
- Incorporated: May 9, 1988

Government
  - Mayor: Paulo Gilberto Altmann (PP)

Area
  - Total: 73,355 km^{2} (28,323 sq mi)
- Elevation: 100 m (330 ft)

Population (2022)
  - Total: 3,080
  - Density: 39.9/km^{2} (103/sq mi)
- Time zone: UTC−3 (BRT)
- Website: imigrante-rs.com.br

Imigrante (population: 3,080) is a city in Rio Grande do Sul, located in south Brazil, situated in the state's Taquari Valley region. It was established by German and Italian immigrants. Imigrante calls itself, Terra do Cactos, or Land of the Cactus.

The city is 100 m above sea level. Its climate is subtropical.

Imigrante's economy centers on the metallurgy industry.

The mayor is Paulo Gilberto Altmann, of the PP party.

== Notable people ==
- Felipe Spellmeier (born 1986), footballer

== Gallery ==
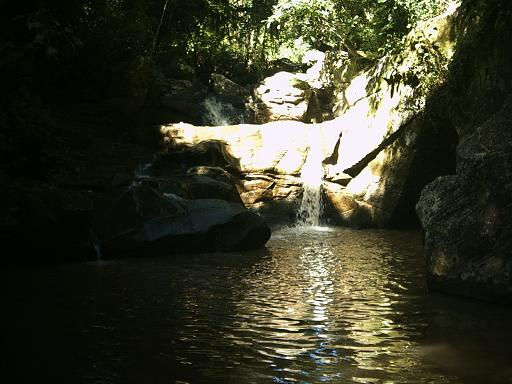
Rosenthal Cascade.

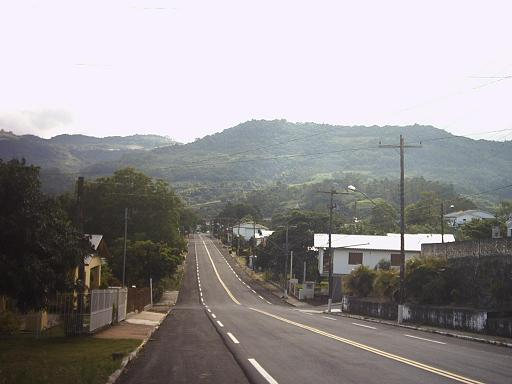
Dr. Ito Snell Main Street, Arroio da Seca Neighbourhood.

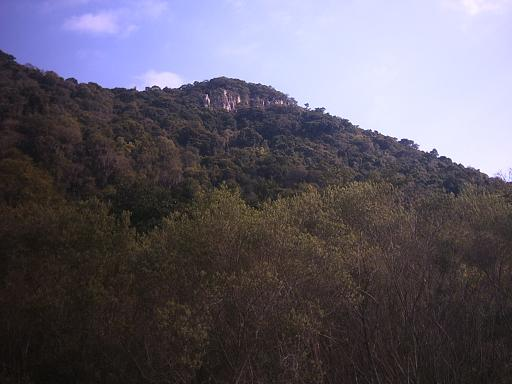
Johannes Fells, 539m.

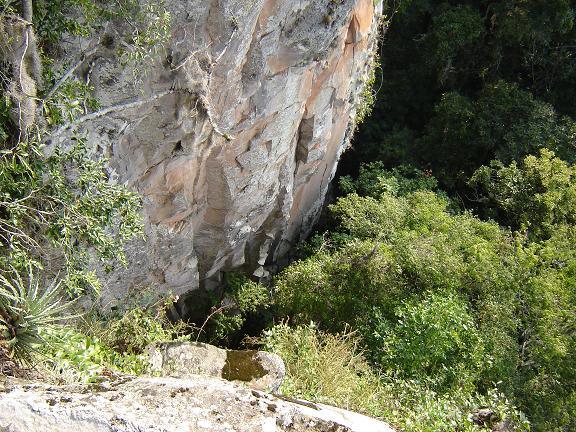
Johannes Fells, 539m.

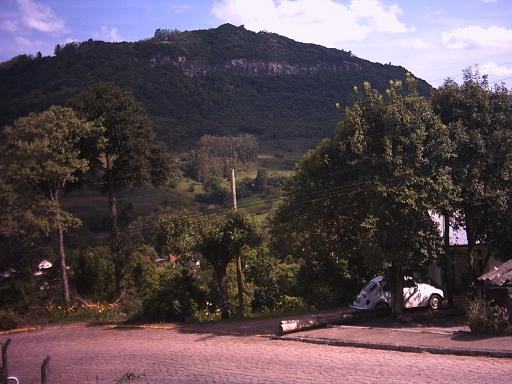
Daltro Filho Neighbourhood, and the Boa Vista 37 Mountain.

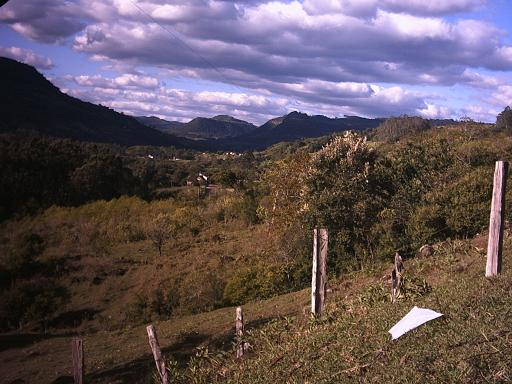
Arroio da Seca Valley.

== See also ==
- List of municipalities in Rio Grande do Sul
