= Top Chef Brasil season 3 =

Top Chef Brasil
- Season 3
- Hosted by: Felipe Bronze
- Judges: Felipe Bronze; Ailin Aleixo; Emmanuel Bassoleil
- No. of contestants: 15
- No. of episodes: 12

Release
- Original network: RecordTV
- Original release: September 24 – December 10, 2021

Season chronology
- ← Previous; Season 2 Next → Season 4

The third season of Top Chef Brasil premiered on Friday, September 24, 2021, at 11:00 p.m. (BRT / AMT) on RecordTV.

== Contestants ==
Name	Age	Hometown	Current residence	Result
Felipe Salles	35	Elói Mendes	Setúbal, Portugal	Eliminated 1st
Julio Cardoso	35	Piraju	São Paulo	Eliminated 2nd
Manu Bressani	25	Porto Alegre	Porto Alegre	Eliminated 3rd
Ana Hirata	34	São Paulo	São Paulo	Eliminated 4th
João Gonçalves	28	Cajazeiras	São Paulo	Eliminated 5th
Rodrigo Kossatz	48	Niterói	Niterói	Eliminated 6th
Carol Galindo	35	Suzano	Suzano	Eliminated 7th
Ana Galotta	32	Manaus	Manaus	Eliminated 8th
Emanuele Lopes	30	Nova Iguaçu	Rio de Janeiro	Eliminated 9th
Natalia Scavone	27	Porto Alegre	Garopaba	Eliminated 10th
Enrique Barrakhuda	32	Lima, Peru	São Paulo	Eliminated 11th
Djalma Victor	36	Sete Lagoas	Belo Horizonte	Eliminated 12th
Gab Thalg	28	São Paulo	São Paulo	Third place
Cadu Evangelisti	30	São Paulo	Ribeirão Preto	Runner-up
Giovanni Renê	29	São Paulo	São Paulo	Winner

== Contestant progress ==
Episode #		1	2	3	4	5	6	7	8	9	10	11	12
Quickfire challenge winner(s)		Ana G. Ana H. Carol; Djalma; Manu; Natalia; Rodrigo	Carol; Djalma; Emanuele; Enrique; João; Rodrigo	Ana G. Giovanni; João	Ana G. Emanuele; João; Natalia	Djalma; Emanuele; Enrique; Giovanni; Natalia; Rodrigo	Ana G. Carol; Emanuele; Enrique; Gab	Cadu; Emanuele; Enrique; Gab; Natalia	Cadu; Djalma; Natalia	Djalma; Gab; Enrique	Gab	Giovanni	—
Contestant		Elimination challenge results											
1	Giovanni	HIGH	LOW	IMM	IMM	IMM	LOW	WIN	HIGH	LOW	LOW	IMM	WINNER
2	Cadu	IN	HIGH	IMM	IMM	HIGH	LOW	IMM	IMM	WIN	LOW	HIGH	OUT
3	Gab	IN	WIN	IMM	IMM	IN	IMM	IMM	LOW	IMM	IMM	LOW	OUT
4	Djalma	IMM	IMM	LOW	WIN	IMM	IN	LOW	IMM	IMM	WIN	OUT	
5	Enrique	WIN	IMM	IMM	HIGH	IMM	IMM	IMM	WIN	IMM	OUT		
6	Natalia	IMM	LOW	HIGH	IMM	IMM	WIN	IMM	IMM	OUT			
7	Emanuele	IN	IMM	IN	IMM	IMM	IMM	IMM	OUT				
8	Ana G.	IMM	HIGH	IMM	IMM	WIN	IMM	OUT					
9	Carol	IMM	IMM	WIN	HIGH	LOW	IMM	OUT					
10	Rodrigo	IMM	IMM	IN	LOW	IMM	OUT						
11	João	LOW	IMM	IMM	IMM	OUT							
12	Ana H.	IMM	IMM	HIGH	OUT								
13	Manu	IMM	IMM	OUT									
14	Julio	LOW	OUT										
15	Felipe	OUT											

Key

- Winner
- Runner-up
- Quickfire challenge immunity
- Elimination challenge winner(s)
- Elimination challenge top entry
- Elimination challenge bottom entry
- Eliminated

== Main guest appearances ==
Episode 2

- Chef Dagoberto Torres

Episode 4

- Chef Mara Salles

Episode 7

- Adriane Galisteu

Episode 8

- Arnaldo Lorençato
- Patrícia Ferraz

== Ratings and reception ==
=== Brazilian ratings ===
All numbers are in points and provided by Kantar Ibope Media.

Episode	Air date	Timeslot (BRT)	SP viewers (in points)	Source
1	September 24, 2021	Friday 11:00 p.m.	5.4	
2	October 1, 2021	Friday 11:00 p.m.	5.1	
3	October 8, 2021	Friday 11:00 p.m.	4.6	
4	October 15, 2021	Friday 11:00 p.m.	4.6	
5	October 22, 2021	Friday 11:00 p.m.	4.5	
6	October 29, 2021	Friday 11:00 p.m.	4.3	
7	November 5, 2021	Friday 11:00 p.m.	3.7	
8	November 12, 2021	Friday 11:00 p.m.	4.2	
9	November 19, 2021	Friday 11:00 p.m.	5.1	
10	November 26, 2021	Friday 11:00 p.m.	4.2	
11	December 3, 2021	Friday 11:00 p.m.	4.4	
12	December 10, 2021	Friday 11:00 p.m.	4.9	

- In 2021, each point represents 268.278 households in 15 market cities in Brazil (76.577 households in São Paulo).
