= Top Chef Brasil season 1 =

Top Chef Brasil
- Season 1
- Hosted by: Felipe Bronze
- Judges: Felipe Bronze; Ailin Aleixo; Emmanuel Bassoleil
- No. of contestants: 16
- Winner: Giovanna Perrone
- No. of episodes: 13

Release
- Original network: RecordTV
- Original release: April 3 – June 26, 2019

Season chronology
- Next → Season 2

The first season of Top Chef Brasil premiered on Wednesday, April 3, 2019 at 10:30 p.m. (BRT / AMT) on RecordTV.

== Contestants ==
Name	Age	Hometown	Current residence	Result
Mariane Kolchraiber	26	São Paulo	Marseille, France	Eliminated 1st
Rebecca Lockwood	41	Rio de Janeiro	Paris, France	Eliminated 2nd
Florian Bassine	26	Soissons, France	São Paulo	Eliminated 3rd
Bia Leitão	37	Fortaleza	Fortaleza	Eliminated 4th
Carmem Fialho	32	São Sebastião	São Paulo	Eliminated 5th
Rogério Cadu	23	Belém	São Paulo	Eliminated 6th
Antonio "Tony" Filho	38	Jequié	São Paulo	Eliminated 7th
Maíra Knox	36	Rio de Janeiro	Jericoacoara	Eliminated 8th
Alex Sotero	39	Rio de Janeiro	São Paulo	Eliminated 9th
Marcus Santander	42	Guaratinguetá	London, UK	Eliminated 10th
Antonio Mendes	31	Rio de Janeiro	São Paulo	Eliminated 11th
Thiago Cerqueira	31	Belo Horizonte	São Paulo	Eliminated 12th
Sheilla Furman	34	Belo Horizonte	Belo Horizonte	Eliminated 13th
Dadis Vilas Boas	29	São Paulo	São Paulo	Third place
Gabriel Vidolin	30	São João da Boa Vista	São João da Boa Vista	Runner-up
Giovanna Perrone	23	Santos	São Paulo	Winner

== Contestant progress ==
Episode #		1	2	3	4	5	6	7	8	9	10	11	12	13
Quickfire challenge winner(s)		Giovanna	Antonio; Cadu; Carmem; Sotero; Tony	Carmem; Dadis	Antonio; Sheilla; Sotero	Sheilla	Dadis; Sheilla; Sotero	—	Antonio	Antonio; Dadis; Marcus; Thiago	Thiago	Sheilla	Giovanna	—
Contestant		Elimination challenge results												
1	Giovanna	IMM	LOW	HIGH	LOW	LOW	IN	WIN	WIN	LOW	IN	WIN	HIGH	WINNER
2	Gabriel	IMM	IN	IN	IN	LOW	HIGH	WIN	LOW	LOW	IN	LOW	HIGH	OUT
3	Dadis	LOW	IN	IMM	IN	IN	IMM	WIN	IN	IMM	LOW	WIN	HIGH	OUT
4	Sheilla	IN	WIN	IN	IMM	IMM	IMM	WIN	HIGH	WIN	WIN	HIGH	OUT	
5	Thiago	IMM	HIGH	IN	WIN	IN	IN	IN	IN	IMM	WIN	OUT		
6	Antonio	IMM	IMM	IN	IMM	IN	WIN	WIN	IMM	IMM	LOW	OUT		
7	Marcus	IN	HIGH	WIN	WIN	IN	HIGH	IN	IN	IMM	OUT			
8	Sotero	HIGH	IMM	LOW	IMM	IN	IMM	LOW	IN	OUT				
9	Maíra	IN	LOW	IN	IN	HIGH	HIGH	HIGH	OUT					
10	Tony	IMM	IMM	IN	WIN	IN	LOW	OUT						
11	Cadu	WIN	IMM	IN	IN	WIN	OUT							
12	Carmem	IN	IMM	IMM	LOW	OUT								
13	Bia	LOW	HIGH	IN	OUT									
14	Florian	IMM	HIGH	OUT										
15	Rebecca	IMM	OUT											
16	Mariane	OUT												

=== Key ===
- Winner
- Runner-up
- Quickfire challenge immunity
- Elimination challenge winner(s)
- Elimination challenge top entry
- Elimination challenge bottom entry
- Eliminated

== Main guest appearances ==
Episode 2

- Chef Rodrigo Ribeiro

Episode 3

- Chef Alex Atala

Episode 4

- Chef Benny Novak

Episode 5

- Chef Bel Coelho

Episode 6

- Chef Oscar Bosch

Episode 7

- Arnaldo Lorençato
- Ricardo Garrido

Episode 8

- Chef Rafael Barros
- Chef Jefferson Rueda

Episode 11

- André Bankoff
- Juliana Knust
- Jaqueline Carvalho
- Mylena Ciribelli
- Marcos Mion

== Ratings and reception ==
=== Brazilian ratings ===
All numbers are in points and provided by Kantar Ibope Media.

Episode	Title	Air date	Timeslot (BRT)	SP viewers (in points)	Source
1	Top 16	April 3, 2019	Wednesday 10:30 p.m.	6.6	
2	Top 15	April 10, 2019	Wednesday 10:30 p.m.	6.7	
3	Top 14	April 17, 2019	Wednesday 10:30 p.m.	5.8	
4	Top 13	April 24, 2019	Wednesday 10:30 p.m.	5.0	
5	Top 12	May 1, 2019	Wednesday 10:45 p.m.	5.4	
6	Top 11	May 8, 2019	Wednesday 10:45 p.m.	5.9	
7	Top 10	May 15, 2019	Wednesday 10:45 p.m.	5.0	
8	Top 9	May 22, 2019	Wednesday 10:45 p.m.	6.0	
9	Top 8	May 29, 2019	Wednesday 10:45 p.m.	6.0	
10	Top 7	June 5, 2019	Wednesday 10:45 p.m.	4.8	
11	Top 6	June 12, 2019	Wednesday 10:45 p.m.	5.8	
12	Top 4	June 19, 2019	Wednesday 10:45 p.m.	5.6	
13	Winner announced	June 26, 2019	Wednesday 10:45 p.m.	5.6	

- In 2019, each point represents 254.892 households in 15 market cities in Brazil (73.015 households in São Paulo).
