= Alan Bahia =

Brazilian footballer (born 1983)

Personal information
- Full name: Alan Pereira Costa
- Date of birth: 14 January 1983 (age 43)
- Place of birth: Itabuna, Brazil
- Height: 1.71 m (5 ft 7 in)
- Position: Defensive midfielder

Team information
- Current team: Carajás (manager)

Youth career
- 2000–2001: Atlético Paranaense

Senior career*
Years	Team	Apps	(Gls)
2002–2012	Atlético Paranaense		
2009	→ Vissel Kobe (loan)	9	(0)
2010–2011	→ Al-Khor (loan)		
2011–2012	→ Goiás (loan)	21	(3)
2012	→ América de Natal (loan)	12	(0)
2013	Rio Verde		
2014	XV de Piracicaba		
2014	Treze		
2015	Mamoré		
2015	Paulista		
2016	Rio Negro		
2018	Vitória da Conquista		

Managerial career
- 2021: Doce Mel
- 2022–2023: Parauapebas (U20)
- 2023–: Carajás
- * Club domestic league appearances and goals

Alan Pereira Costa, or simply Alan Bahia, (born 14 January 1983) is a Brazilian football coach and a former player who is the manager of Carajás.

== Playing career ==
Alan Bahia made his professional debut in a 0–0 draw away to Goiás on October 5, 2002. Bahia is also the player with most appearances for Atlético Paranaense in the history of the Brazilian League, with 188 matches.

== Honours ==
Atlético Paranaense

- Campeonato Paranaense: 2005
