= Flávio (footballer, born 1970) =

Brazilian footballer (1970–2025)

Personal information
- Full name: Flávio Emídio dos Santos Vieira
- Date of birth: 17 December 1970
- Place of birth: Maceió, Alagoas, Brazil
- Date of death: 13 July 2025 (aged 54)
- Place of death: Maceió, Alagoas, Brazil
- Height: 1.86 m (6 ft 1 in)
- Position: Goalkeeper

Youth career
- 1989–1990: CSA

Senior career*
Years	Team	Apps	(Gls)
1991–1994	CSA		
1995–2002	Atlético Paranaense	112	(0)
2003	Vasco		
2003–2007	Paraná	117	(0)
2008–2011	América Mineiro	46	(0)
2012–2013	CSA	56	(0)
- * Club domestic league appearances and goals

Flávio Emídio dos Santos Vieira (17 December 1970 – 13 July 2025) was a Brazilian footballer who played as a goalkeeper. He died from prostate cancer in Maceió, on 13 July 2025, at the age of 54.

== Honours ==
CSA

- Campeonato Alagoano: 1991, 1994

Atlético Paranaense

- Campeonato Brasileiro Série B: 1995
- Campeonato Paranaense: 1998, 2000, 2001, 2002 (Super Championship)
- Campeonato Brasileiro Série A: 2001

Vasco da Gama

- Campeonato Carioca: 2003

Paraná

- Campeonato Paranaense: 2006

América Mineiro

- Campeonato Mineiro Módulo II: 2008
- Campeonato Brasileiro Série C: 2009
