= Picon (footballer) =

Brazilian footballer

Personal information
- Full name: Fernando Picon da Silva
- Date of birth: 6 February 1976 (age 50)
- Place of birth: São Paulo, Brazil
- Height: 1.81 m (5 ft 11 1/2 in)
- Positions: Central defender; defensive midfielder

Senior career*
Years	Team	Apps	(Gls)
1997–1999	São Paulo		
2000	XV de Piracicaba		
2000–2001	Ionikos		
2003	OFK Beograd		
2003–2005	Imperatriz		
2006	Rio Preto		
2007	Ionikos		
2007	→ Shanghai Stars (loan)		
2008	Poços de Caldas		
2008–2009	Pelotas		
2009	Ituano		
- * Club domestic league appearances and goals

Fernando Picon da Silva (born 6 February 1976), known simply as Picon, is a Brazilian retired footballer who played as a defender.

== Career ==
Born in São Paulo, he begin his career playing with local giants São Paulo FC. He was part of São Paulo team that won the 1998 Campeonato Paulista. He played one season with XV de Piracicaba in 2001 before moving abroad to play with Super League Greece side Ionikos F.C.

He had a spell in Serbia playing with OFK Beograd in the First League of FR Yugoslavia before returning to Brazil. In 2004, he was playing with Sociedade Imperatriz de Desportos winning with them the state championship in 2005.

After a spell with Rio Preto Esporte Clube in 2006 he will return to Ionikos F.C. in early 2007, however as the club ended up relegated at the end of the 2006-07 season, Picon was loaned to Chinese side Shanghai Stars until the end of the year.

In 2008, he returned to Brazil joining Poços de Caldas, a side that had just been formed a year earlier. Between summer 2008 and 2009 he will play with Esporte Clube Pelotas, before finishing the year with Ituano Futebol Clube.

== Honours ==
São Paulo

- Campeonato Paulista: 1998

Imperatriz

- Campeonato Maranhense: 2005

Pelotas

- Copa FGF: 2008
