= Paulo Campos (football manager) =

Brazilian football manager

Personal information
- Full name: Paulo Luiz Campos
- Date of birth: 20 February 1957 (age 69)
- Place of birth: Niterói, Rio de Janeiro, Brazil

Managerial career
- Years: Team
- 1981–1982: Calabar Rovers
- 1983–1984: Kuwait
- 1985: São Cristóvão
- 1985–1986: Friburguense
- 1986: Liberia
- 1987: Friburguense
- 1987: Ohud
- 1988–1989: Ghana U17
- 1989–1990: Kuwait U17
- 1990–1991: Al-Shabab Riyadh
- 1992–1993: Kuwait
- 1993–1994: Al-Ahli Dubai
- 1995–1996: Al-Ittihad Jeddah
- 1996–1997: Al-Nasr Dubai
- 1998: Al-Ittihad Jeddah
- 1999: Al-Wasl
- 1999: Botafogo U-20
- 2000: Al-Shabab Riyadh
- 2000–2001: Al-Rayyan
- 2001: Qatar
- 2002: Palmeiras B
- 2003: Al-Sailiya
- 2003–2004: Iraty
- 2004–2005: Paraná Clube
- 2005: Paysandu
- 2006: Vila Nova
- 2006: Fluminense
- 2006: Náutico
- 2006–2008: Asteras Tripolis
- 2008: Criciúma
- 2009: Iraty
- 2009: Mogi Mirim
- 2009–2010: Al-Hilal Omdurman
- 2011: Resende
- 2011: Duque de Caxias
- 2012: Resende
- 2012: Guaratinguetá
- 2012–2013: Fujairah
- 2013–2014: Resende
- 2014: Tupi
- 2014–2015: Aris
- 2015: Resende
- 2017–2018: São José dos Campos
- 2018–2019: Platanias
- 2019–2020: Tupynambás

Paulo Luiz Campos (born 20 February 1957), known as Paulo Campos, is a Brazilian football manager.

== Honours ==
Al Shabab

- Saudi Premier League: 1990–91
- Arab Super Cup: 2000

Al-Rayyan

- Qatar Crown Prince Cup: 2001

Asteras Tripolis

- Beta Ethniki: 2006–07

Al-Hilal Omdurman

- Sudan Premier League: 2010
