= Rogério Corrêa (footballer, born 1979) =

Brazilian footballer

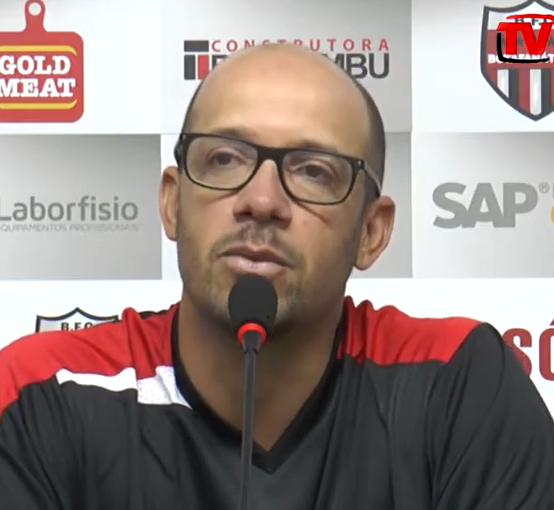
- Corrêa in 2018

Personal information
- Full name: Rogério Corrêa de Oliveira
- Date of birth: 3 January 1979 (age 47)
- Place of birth: Goiânia, Brazil
- Height: 1.86 m (6 ft 1 in)
- Position: Centre-back

Youth career
- Goiânia

Senior career*
Years	Team	Apps	(Gls)
1998–2001	Goiânia		
1999	→ Santo André (loan)		
2001	→ Vila Nova (loan)		
2001–2005	Atlético Paranaense		
2005	Shimizu S-Pulse		
2005–2006	Goiás	32	(2)
2007–2008	Atlético Paranaense		
2008	Illychivets Mariupol	1	(0)
2009	Bahia		
2009	→ Joinville (loan)		
2010	Paysandu	8	(1)
2011	Anapolina	6	(0)

Managerial career
- 2011: Anapolina
- 2012: Lemense
- 2012: Corinthians Paranaense (assistant)
- 2013: J. Malucelli U20
- 2016: Goiânia U20
- 2016–2017: Botafogo-SP U17
- 2017–2018: Botafogo-SP U20
- 2018–2019: Atlético Paranaense U17
- 2019–2020: Athletico Paranaense (assistant)
- 2021: Votuporanguense
- 2021–2022: Atlético Goianiense U20
- 2022–2023: Marcílio Dias
- 2023: Marília
- 2024–2025: Votuporanguense
- 2025–2026: Grêmio Prudente
- * Club domestic league appearances and goals

Rogério Corrêa de Oliveira (born 3 January 1979), known as Rogério Corrêa, is a Brazilian football coach and former player who played as a centre-back.

== Career ==
Rogério Corrêa played for Illichivets in 2008, joining Bahia on 5 January 2009. On 23 March 2009 Joinville have signed the central defender on loan from Bahia for a three-month period.

== Honours ==
=== Player ===
Goiânia

- Campeonato Goiano Segunda Divisão: 1998

Vila Nova

- Campeonato Goiano: 2001

Atlético Paranaense

- Campeonato Brasileiro Série A: 2001
- Campeonato Paranaense: 2002, 2005

Goiás

- Campeonato Goiano: 2006

=== Coach ===
Marcílio Dias

- Copa Santa Catarina: 2022

Votuporanguense

- Campeonato Paulista Série A3: 2024
