= Lousano =

Lousano was a Brazilian company that specializes in electric cables and conductors. Along with Paulista FC, they were one of the pioneers in "corporate" clubs.

== Controversy ==
In 2003, Grassioto was indicted for tax evasion and obtaining fraud through financing in a financial institution. The businessman was subsequently acquitted and acquitted for lack of evidence.
