= Jair Picerni =

Brazilian footballer and manager

Personal information
- Full name: Jair Picerni
- Date of birth: 20 October 1944 (age 82)
- Place of birth: São Paulo (SP), Brazil
- Position: Right back

Senior career*
Years	Team	Apps	(Gls)
1967–1972	Comercial		
1973–1976	Guarani		
1976–1978	Ponte Preta		

Managerial career
- 1980–1981: Ponte Preta
- 1982–1983: Inter de Limeira
- 1983–1984: Santo André
- 1984–1985: Corinthians
- 1985–1986: Portuguesa
- 1986: Al Ain
- 1986–1987: Ponte Preta
- 1987: Sport Recife
- 1988: Botafogo-SP
- 1988–1989: Portuguesa
- 1989–1991: Nacional da Madeira
- 1991–1992: Santo André
- 1992–1995: União São João
- 1996–1998: Nacional da Madeira
- 1998–1999: União Barbarense
- 1999–2000: Gama
- 2000–2002: São Caetano
- 2002: Guarani
- 2003–2004: Palmeiras
- 2004: Atlético Mineiro
- 2004–2005: Guarani
- 2005: Bahia
- 2005: São Caetano
- 2006: Fortaleza
- 2006: Brasiliense
- 2006: Palmeiras
- 2007: Sertãozinho
- 2007: São Caetano
- 2008: Guarani
- 2009: Red Bull Brasil
- 2010: Santo André
- * Club domestic league appearances and goals

Jair Picerni (born October 20, 1944) is a Brazilian football manager and former player, who played as a right back.

With São Caetano, Picerni was twice runner-up in the Campeonato Brasileiro Série A (2000 and 2001) and once in the Copa Libertadores (2002).

== Honours ==
Brazil Olympic

- Silver medal: 1984

Sport Recife

- Campeonato Brasileiro: 1987

São Caetano

- Campeonato Paulista Série A2: 2000

Palmeiras

- Campeonato Brasileiro Série B: 2003

Red Bull Brasil

- Campeonato Paulista Segunda Divisão: 2009

== See also ==
- List of football managers with the most matches
