= Nem (footballer, born 1973) =

Brazilian footballer

Personal information
- Full name: Rinaldo Francisco de Lima
- Date of birth: January 19, 1973 (age 53)
- Place of birth: Recife, Brazil
- Height: 1.82 m (6 ft 0 in)
- Position: Central defender

Youth career
- 1993–1994: São Paulo

Senior career*
Years	Team	Apps	(Gls)
1995–1999	São Paulo	46	(0)
2000	Paraná		
2001	Atlético-PR	24	(2)
2002	Atlético Mineiro	18	(0)
2002–2007	SC Braga	91	(0)
2007	Paraná		

Managerial career
- 2011: Vitória-PE
- 2011: São José-PR
- 2012: XV de Jaú
- 2013: Vitória-PE
- * Club domestic league appearances and goals

Rinaldo Francisco de Lima (born January 19, 1973, in Recife), or simply Nem, is a former Brazilian football player, specialising as a central defender.

== Career ==
Nem started his career at São Paulo playing alongside Rogerio Ceni, Edmilson, and Cafu in 1994, he played for the club until the 1999 season after a fallout with then President Juvenal Juvêncio. He then left for Paraná but after dispute over his hage wages he soon left only after a season.

He then joined Atlético-PR but then left for Atlético Mineiro. Here is where he would relive his São Paulo days, playing alongside one of the team's best line ups where he and Cicinho and Álvaro created one of the League's strongest defenses.

After several good showings he then left for SC Braga where he was influential in the back and enjoyed 5 years in Portugal before returning to Brazil in June 2007 for Paraná.

== Honours ==
- São Paulo State League: 1998, 2000
- Brazilian League (2nd division): 2000
- Brazilian League: 2001
- Paraná State League: 2001

== Contract ==
- 12 June 2007 to 31 December 2007
