= Cocito =

Brazilian footballer (born 1977)

Personal information
- Full name: Thiago Marcelo Silveira Cocito
- Date of birth: August 24, 1977 (age 49)
- Place of birth: Bebedouro, Brazil
- Height: 1.79 m (5 ft 10 in)
- Position: Defensive midfielder

Youth career
- 1994–1996: Botafogo-SP

Senior career*
Years	Team	Apps	(Gls)
1996–1998	Botafogo-SP	0	(0)
1998–2003	Atlético Paranaense	50	(0)
2003	Corinthians	13	(0)
2004	Grêmio	40	(0)
2005	Atletico Paranaense	23	(0)
2005–2006	Tenerife	0	(0)
2006–2007	Real Murcia	0	(0)
2007	Fortaleza	8	(0)
2009	Boavista	0	(0)
2009	Vila Nova-GO	11	(0)
- * Club domestic league appearances and goals as of March 10, 2012

Thiago Marcelo Silveira Cocito or simply Cocito (born August 24, 1977), is a Brazilian former footballer who last played for Vila Nova-GO.

Cocito previously played for Grêmio and Atletico Paranaense in the Campeonato Brasileiro. He also had a spell with Tenerife in the Spanish Segunda División.
