= Alvorada do Sul =

Coordinates: 22°47′S 51°11′W

- Municipality
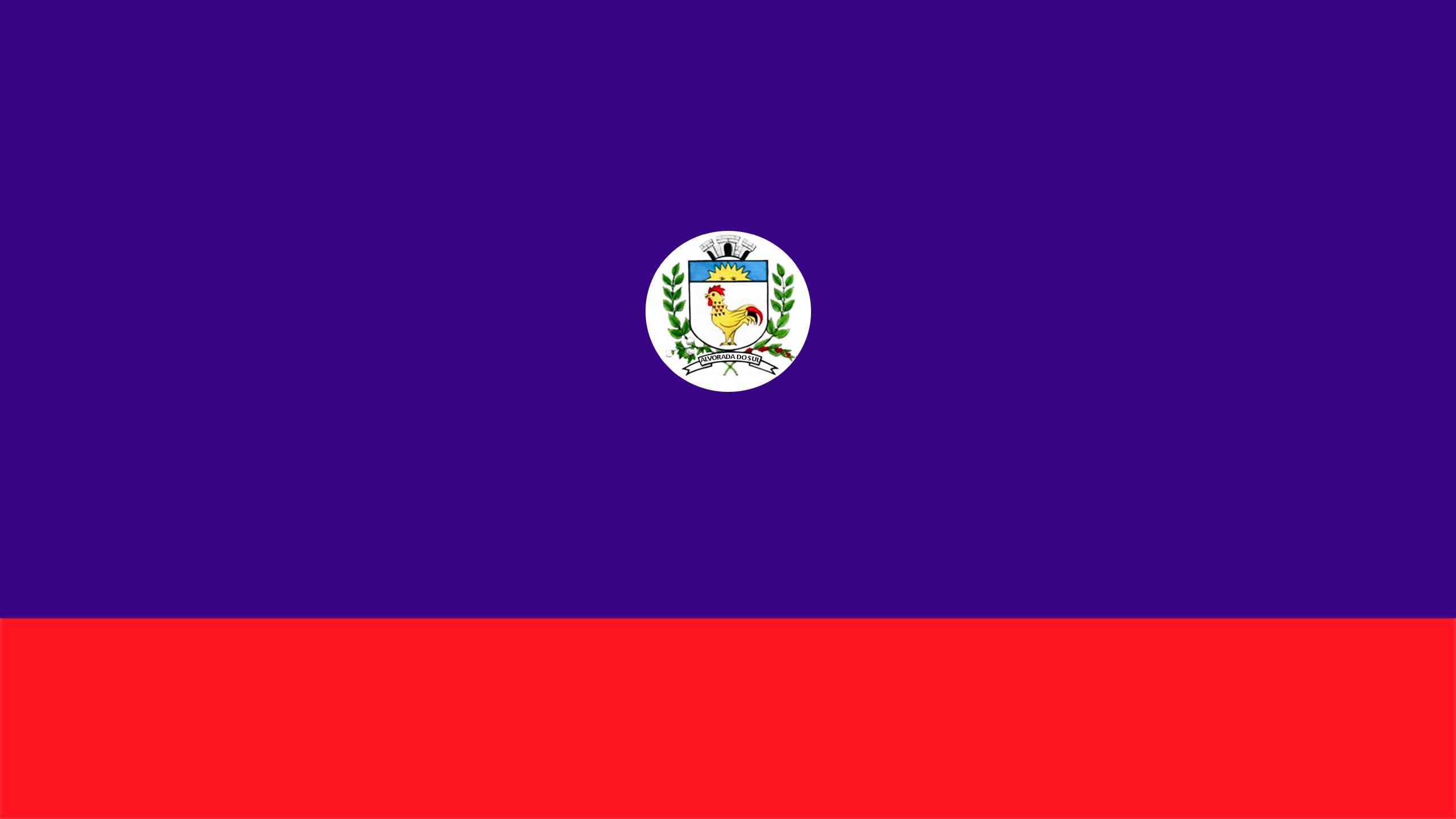
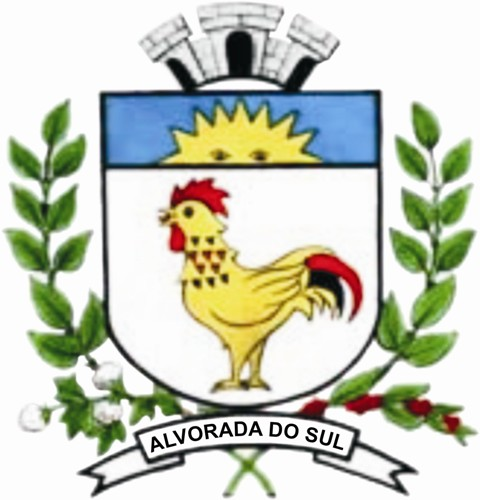
- Flag Coat of arms
- Interactive map of Alvorada do Sul
- Country: Brazil
- Region: Southern
- State: Paraná
- Mesoregion: Norte Central Paranaense

Population (2020)
  - Total: 11,503
- Time zone: UTC−3 (BRT)

Alvorada do Sul is a municipality in the state of Paraná in the Southern Region of Brazil.

== See also ==
- List of municipalities in Paraná
