= José Luiz Plein =

Brazilian footballer

Personal information
- Full name: José Luiz Plein Filho
- Date of birth: 25 April 1951 (age 75)
- Place of birth: Santa Maria, Rio Grande do Sul, Brazil
- Position: Midfielder

Senior career*
Years	Team	Apps	(Gls)
1970–1974	Inter de Santa Maria		
1974–1977	Coritiba		
1977	Juventude		
1981	Grêmio		
1983–1984	Caxias		
1986	Esportivo		
1987	Brasil de Farroupilha		
1988	Glória		

Managerial career
- 2003: Juventude
- 2004: Glória
- 2004: Grêmio
- 2005: Criciúma
- 2006: Glória
- 2007: Guarani-VA
- * Club domestic league appearances and goals

José Luiz Plein Filho known as José Luiz Plein (born 25 April 1951 in Santa Maria, Rio Grande do Sul) is a retired Brazilian professional football player, who played as offensive midfielder and currently manager.

== Career as a player ==
Began in the Inter de Santa Maria and served in other gauchos teams: Grêmio (where he was champion of Gaucho and champion of Brazil in 1981), Caxias, Juventude, Esportivo, Bento Gonçalves, Brasil de Farroupilha, Glória de Vacaria, where he finished his career in 1988. With Coritiba he was triple champion of Paraná in 1974–76.

== Career as a manager ==
Since 2003 he coached the Juventude, Glória, Grêmio, Criciúma and Guarani-VA.
