= Silvio Luiz (footballer) =

Brazilian footballer

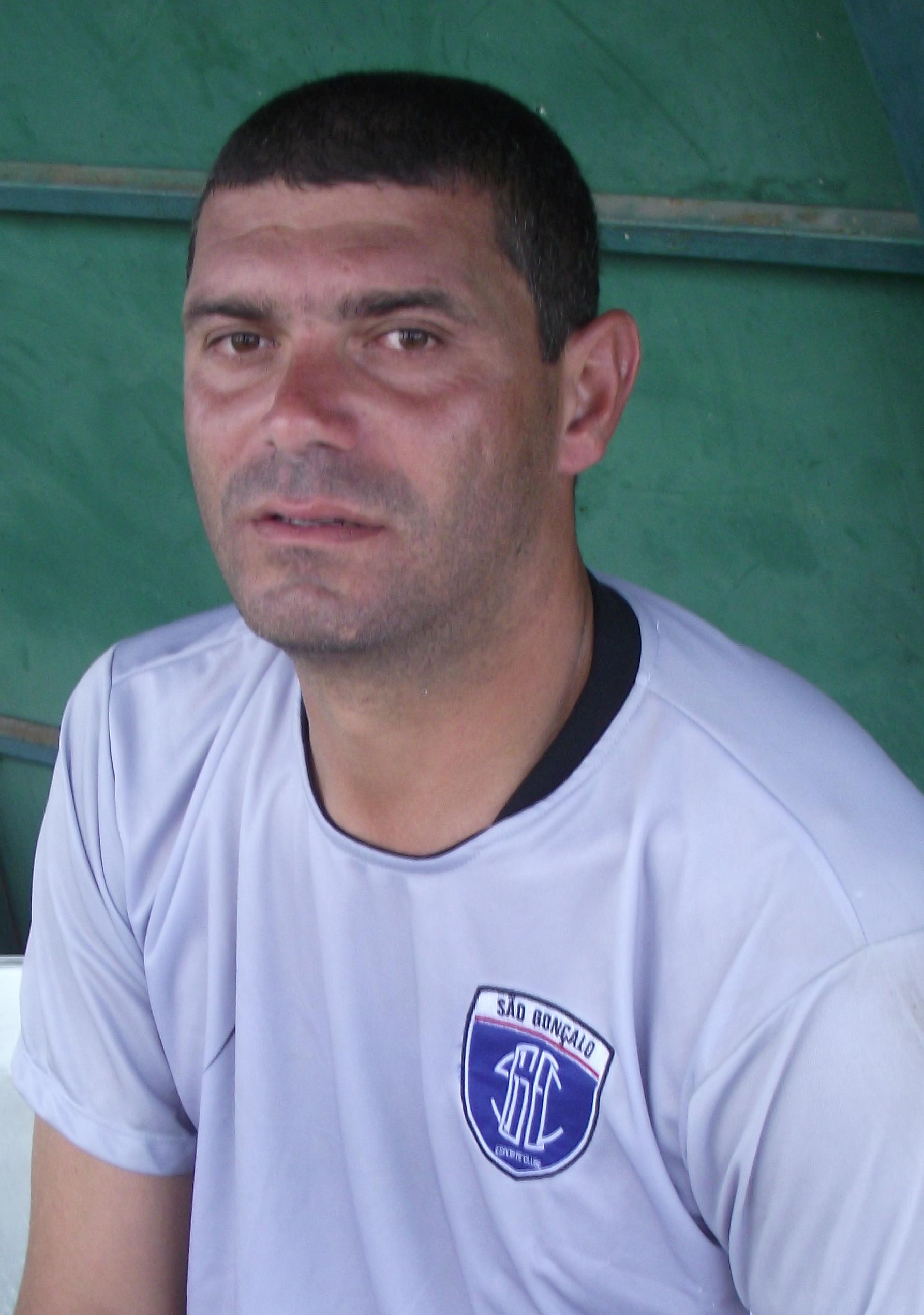
- Silvio Luiz in 2012

Personal information
- Full name: Silvio Luiz Oliveira de Paula
- Date of birth: 1 March 1977 (age 49)
- Place of birth: Rio de Janeiro, Brazil
- Height: 1.98 m (6 ft 6 in)
- Position: Goalkeeper

Youth career
- 1995–1996: Flamengo

Senior career*
Years	Team	Apps	(Gls)
1997–1998	Mirassol	0	(0)
1998–2006	São Caetano	202	(0)
2006–2007	Corinthians	15	(0)
2007	Vasco	37	(0)
2008–2009	Boavista	0	(0)
2009	Juventude	10	(0)
2010	Duque de Caxias	0	(0)
2010	Boavista	0	(0)
Total		264	(0)

International career
1999–2000	Brazil	3	(0)
- * Club domestic league appearances and goals

Silvio Luiz Oliveira de Paula or simply Silvio Luiz (born 1 March 1977), is a Brazilian former professional footballer who played as a goalkeeper. In his professional career, he mainly represented São Caetano (nine seasons). He last played for Boavista Sport Club.
