= Star (sport badge) =

Badge worn on sports jerseys to mark selected trophies won by a team

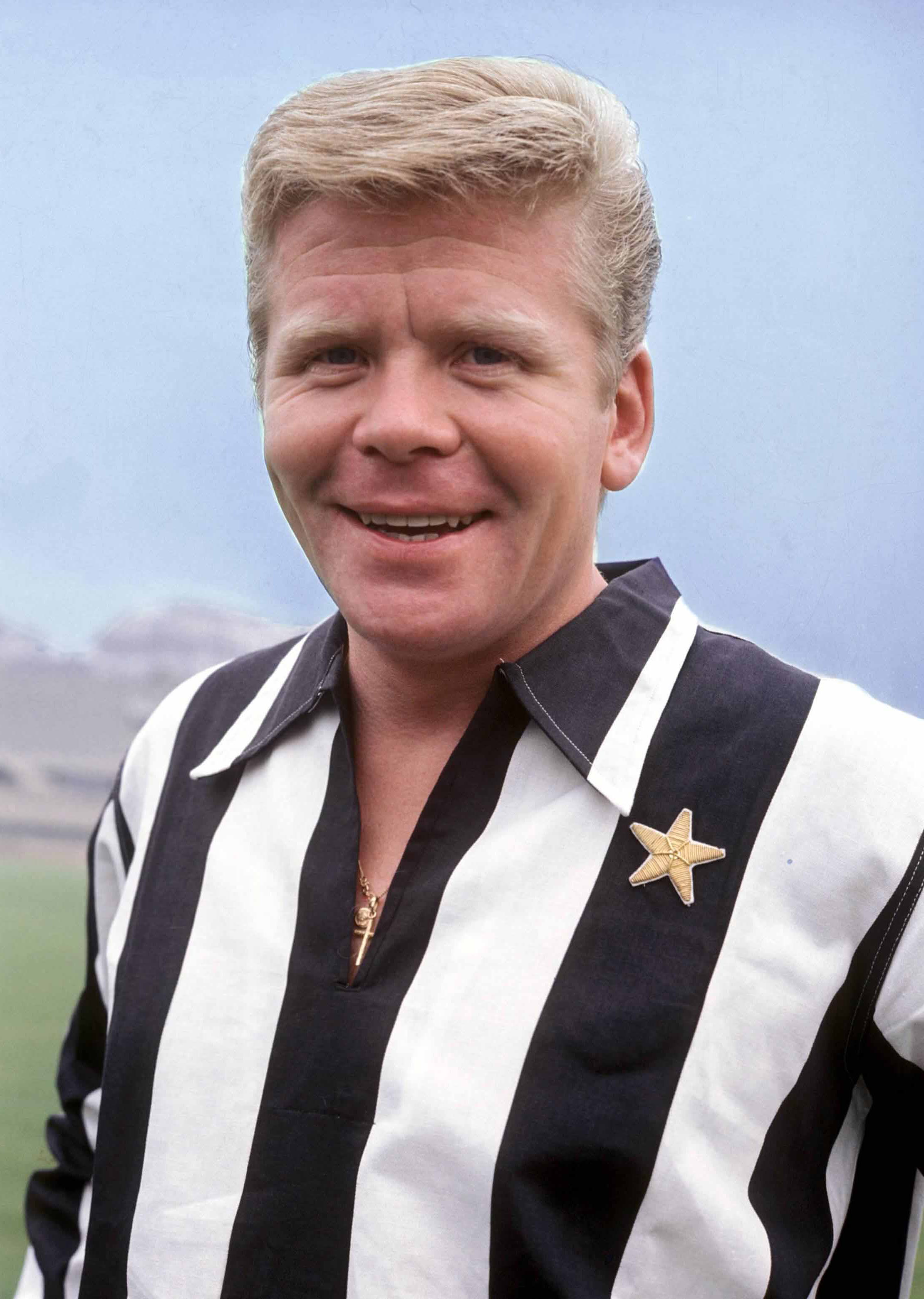
West German footballer Helmut Haller wearing a Juventus shirt. FIGC first introduced the star as sporting symbol worldwide in 1958, Juventus being the first club to wear it.

In sport, some national and club teams include one or more stars as part of (or beside) the team badge (often referred to as a "crest") appearing on their kits, often on the shirts, to represent important achievements for the team's history. Generally inspired by the star symbol in heraldry, since the late 1950s, when it was introduced for the first time in association football, various national governing bodies at club level and some confederations have also regulated the practice.

Fédération Internationale de Football Association (FIFA), at an international level, was the first federation to regulate the addition of stars to crests in recognition of a significant number of titles in a specific competition, such as league tournaments, confederations' continental championships, club world titles and the FIFA World Cup. Due to the positive reception in the public opinion, it was subsequently introduced in other disciplines, mostly in team sports, but also in e-sports. In continental competitions, a star is awarded to the champion, as well as in some countries and domestic competitions, where the champion teams can add a star to the logo with the number of championships in the league. In Asian competitions and domestic leagues, however, some countries do not impose nor follow this rule.

== Stars in domestic football competitions ==
=== By country ===
==== Australia ====
In Australia, a system based around different coloured stars for different trophy wins is used: Australian winners of the AFC Champions League will wear a gold star inscribed with the number of wins, while A-League and W-League victory is recognised with a silver star similarly embossed; reigning league or FFA Cup champions will also wear a gold competition emblem in the season following the championship.

==== Germany ====
Germany has two official star systems operating in parallel. In 2004, the DFL, which governs the Bundesliga (the top two divisions), introduced Verdiente Meistervereine (roughly "distinguished champion clubs"). This has a sliding scale of 1, 2, 3, 4 and 5 stars for 3, 5, 10, 20 and 30 titles. It includes only Bundesliga titles, excluding titles from before the formation of the Bundesliga in 1963, and from the former East German League. Dynamo Berlin (playing in the fourth level) unilaterally began wearing three unapproved stars for its East German titles. In November 2005, the DFB, which governs non-Bundesliga football, allowed former champions playing outside the Bundesliga to display a single star inscribed with the number of titles. In 2007, Dynamo Berlin switched to a single approved star inscribed with the number 10. Greuther Fürth retains three silver stars on its club badge to celebrate three pre-Bundesliga titles, but the stars are not featured on its shirts.

==== Italy ====
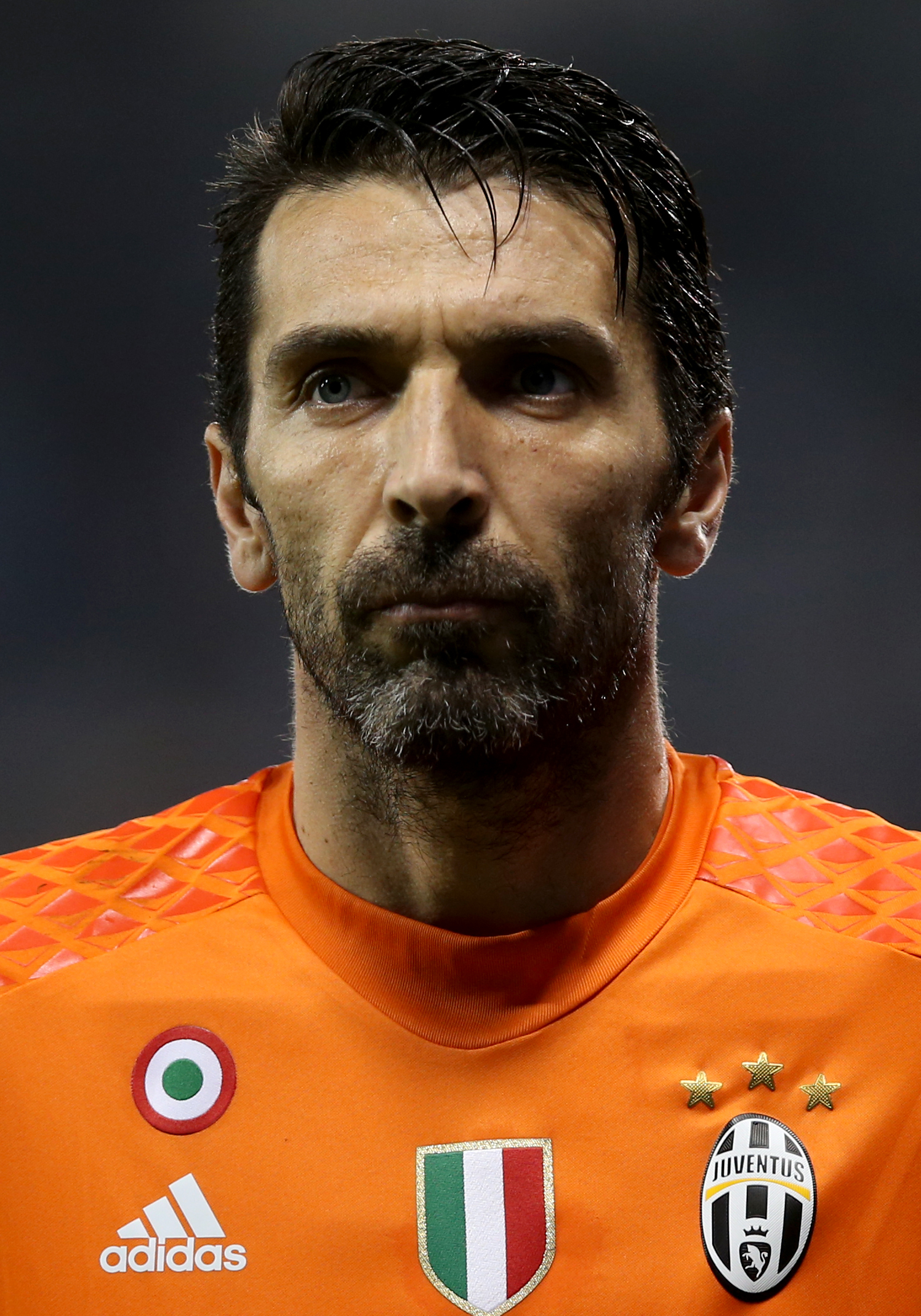
Gianluigi Buffon in 2016. Juventus FC wear 3 stars above their crest to represent the 30 league championships they have amassed. Also present in the image are the Scudetto and the Coccarda, worn by the current holders of the Serie A and Coppa Italia titles respectively.

In 1958, Juventus won its tenth Serie A title, the first team to reach that mark. The Governing council of the Italian Football Federation (FIGC) permitted clubs to add one five-pointed golden star to the team's shirt to represent their tenth title, an extension of the convention that the reigning champions are entitled to display the scudetto on their shirts.

The Italian National Olympic Committee, CONI, has given, since 1933, the honorary Stella d'oro al merito sportivo (Italian for 'Golden Stars for Sports Merit'), to sporting bodies and personalities for sustained achievement. The star was later formally adopted by the rest of the sporting organizations in the country as a symbol for ten titles, and the ratio of one star for ten titles has become the "most common" arrangement worldwide.

Juventus would have won their third star in 2011–12, had it not been implicated in the 2006 Italian football scandal. The Italian Football Federation had stripped Juventus of their 2004–05 title and did not award it the 2005–06 title. In protest, Juventus wore no stars at all the following, 2012-13, season.

Juventus won their 30th title in 2013–14, earning the right to a third star. However, club president Andrea Agnelli said Juventus would not wear its stars until any other team had secured a second star, "to emphasise the difference". However, for the 2015–16 season, Juventus and new kit manufacturers Adidas added all three stars to its shirt. Juventus did not add a silver star to that shirt, despite having just won the Coppa Italia for the tenth time in 2014-15.

==== Scotland ====
In Scotland, Rangers displayed five stars above the badge on their shirts in 2003 to symbolize their 50 league titles. Celtic, who also have more than 50 league titles, have one star above their badge to represent their triumph in the 1967 European Cup. Aberdeen displayed two stars to commemorate their 1980s wins in the European Cup Winners' Cup and European Super Cup.

==== United States of America ====
Major League Soccer's previously informal system, one star per MLS Cup title, was standardized in 2006, with the defending champions wearing the MLS Scudetto, like the Serie A system, for one season before adding a new star. Starting in 2012, the Scudetto was replaced with a single gold star worn by reigning champions above any other silver championship stars. In 2016, this system changed again in recognition of the LA Galaxy's fifth championship title: champion clubs during their title defence wore an oversized gold star (featuring the year of the league win) above other smaller stars set in silver; clubs with five championships (presently only the Galaxy) will wear one gold star; and teams with one-to-four MLS Cup wins will wear one silver star for each victory. In 2020 the system was changed again with the defending champion receiving a silver star and wearing a redesigned MLS scudetto on their sleeve for the following season.

=== Marking success of predecessor clubs and leagues ===
Occasionally, stars are added to badges of successor or phoenix clubs for the achievements of defunct predecessors. An example of this is the Tampa Bay Rowdies. They added a star to represent the Soccer Bowl, the championship of the original NASL, won by the original Tampa Bay Rowdies in 1975. The club has since added a second star, after the new club won the 2012 edition of the resurrected Soccer Bowl in the new NASL, and kept both stars upon joining the USL Championship. MLS teams who won titles in other leagues prior to joining the MLS do not retain the stars worn by the old clubs when they joined the MLS. (Note: The Seattle Sounders that played from 1994 to 2008 wore four stars, while the former Montreal Impact team wore three stars at the time of their move.) In the case of the Impact, the new team paid tribute to the former team's first title through the stripes on their badge.

The Tampa Bay Rowdies added a star in recognition of a title won by a former club with the same name. They have since added another star after the new club won a league championship of its own.

As well as predecessor clubs, victories in the national leagues of defunct countries have also been represented by stars. FC Dynamo Kyiv have two stars, commemorating championships won in the Soviet and Ukrainian football league systems. The same is true of Belgrade clubs Partizan and Red Star who have won titles in Yugoslavia, Serbia and Montenegro and present-day Serbia, while Spartak Moscow's four stars for every five league titles refer to their 22 Soviet Top League and Russian Football Premier League titles.

=== Use in language ===
The star has given rise to a byword to winning trophies. Examples of this include when Fawaz Al-Hasawi, then owner of English side Nottingham Forest, was quoted as saying "maybe [Nottingham Forest] will have a third star", in reference to Forest's two European Cups; and France international Paul Pogba's comments when asked about stars in the days before the 2018 FIFA World Cup Final: "Croatia do not have stars – they want one. They have done very well and they want the victory, like us. But I do not have a star. It's on the shirt, but I did not win it. We want to go looking for it like all players."

== International ==
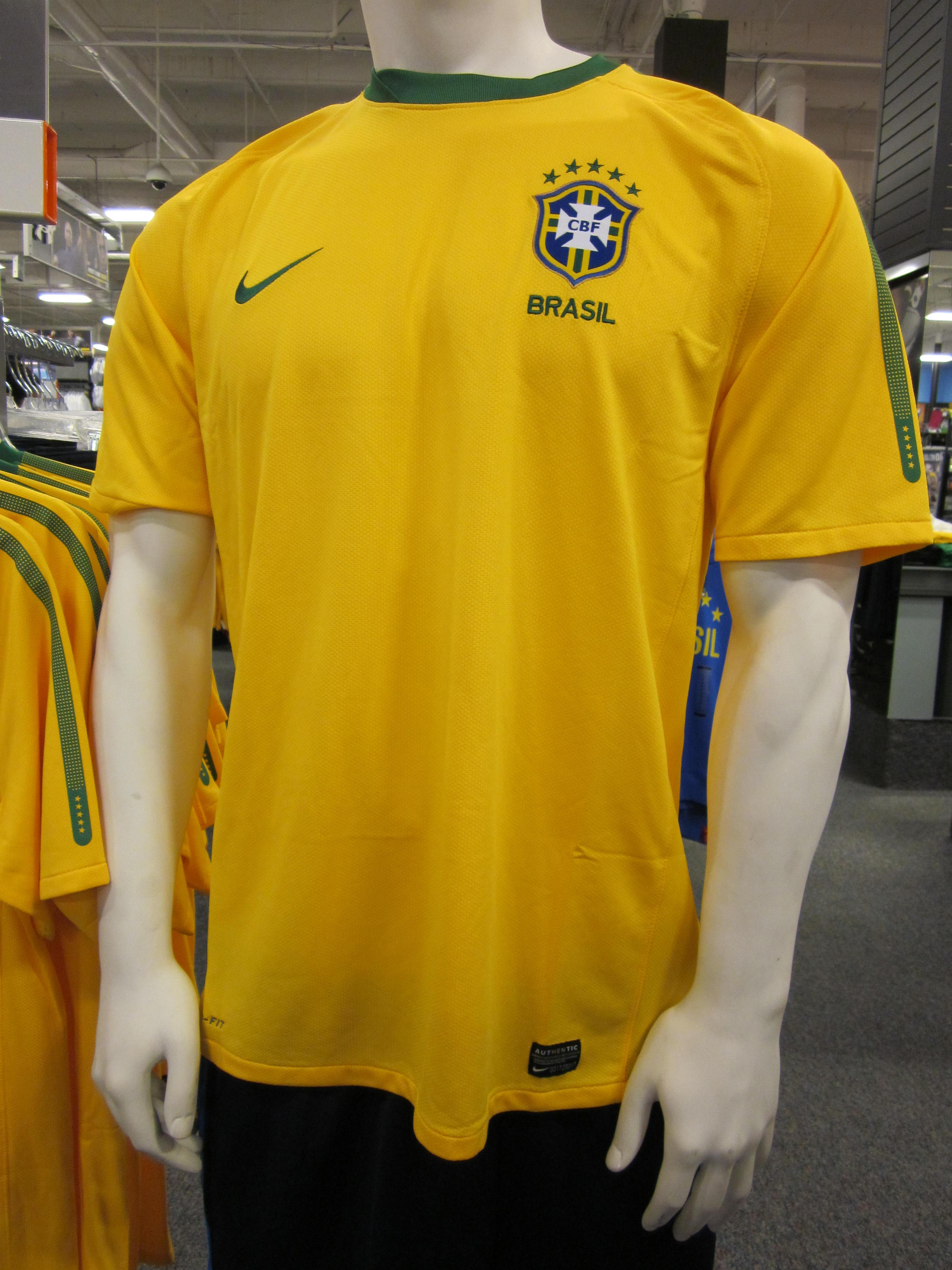
The first international team to add stars was Brazil. Their badge now features five stars.

Brazil had two stars above their badge in 1968. It was used briefly (friendly matches only) and then removed. After winning their third World Cup in 1970, three stars were officially added and Italy did likewise in 1982. Germany added three in 1996, one in each of the German flag's colours. All world champions have since followed suit. Brazil, Italy, and Germany have since added more stars, after they won later tournaments, while Spain are the most recent nation to add a star, after beating Argentina in 2026.

Uruguay display four stars, including their triumphs in the 1924 and 1928 Olympics, which are regarded as FIFA amateur world championships by the governing body. The 1924 FIFA Congress ruled, "on condition that the Olympic Football Tournament takes place in accordance with the Regulations of FIFA, the latter shall recognize this as a world football championship", and the 1924 and 1928 championships are regarded as equivalent to World Cups in the 1984 Official History of FIFA.

In the equipment regulations for FIFA competitions, section 16.1 states, "Those Member Associations that have won one or more of the previous editions of the FIFA World Cup or the FIFA Women's World Cup may display on the Playing Equipment used by their first men's or women's representative teams a five-pointed star, or other symbol as instructed by FIFA, per edition of the FIFA World Cup (men's shirt) or FIFA Women's World Cup (women's shirt) won by the Member Association." The form of symbol is now specified, the accompanying illustrative example depicts a gold star.

Some national teams, especially ones in Africa, wear stars for winning continental competitions. For example, Egypt has seven stars above their badge for their seven Africa Cup of Nations wins, but these stars can only be worn during continental competitions, not FIFA competitions.

== Ad hoc adoptions ==
More recently, club teams have added stars either upon winning a landmark trophy, or in response to a rival team's having added stars. In the Romanian first league, Steaua uses 2 stars above their badge since they won their 20th title. Since then Dinamo added a star for the 18 championships they won. Manchester United sported a star in their UEFA Champions League matches on their special European home kit between 1997 and 1999. To celebrate their second victory that year, they added an extra star to that kit for the 1999–00 season. Liverpool likewise wore four stars in 2001–02, their first campaign in the competition since the Heysel Stadium disaster in 1985. They wore five stars in the competition in 2005–06 after their fifth victory. Instead of stars, UEFA introduced a multiple winner badge in 2000–01 season, currently worn by five teams who have won the Champions League either five times or more in total, or three times in a row.

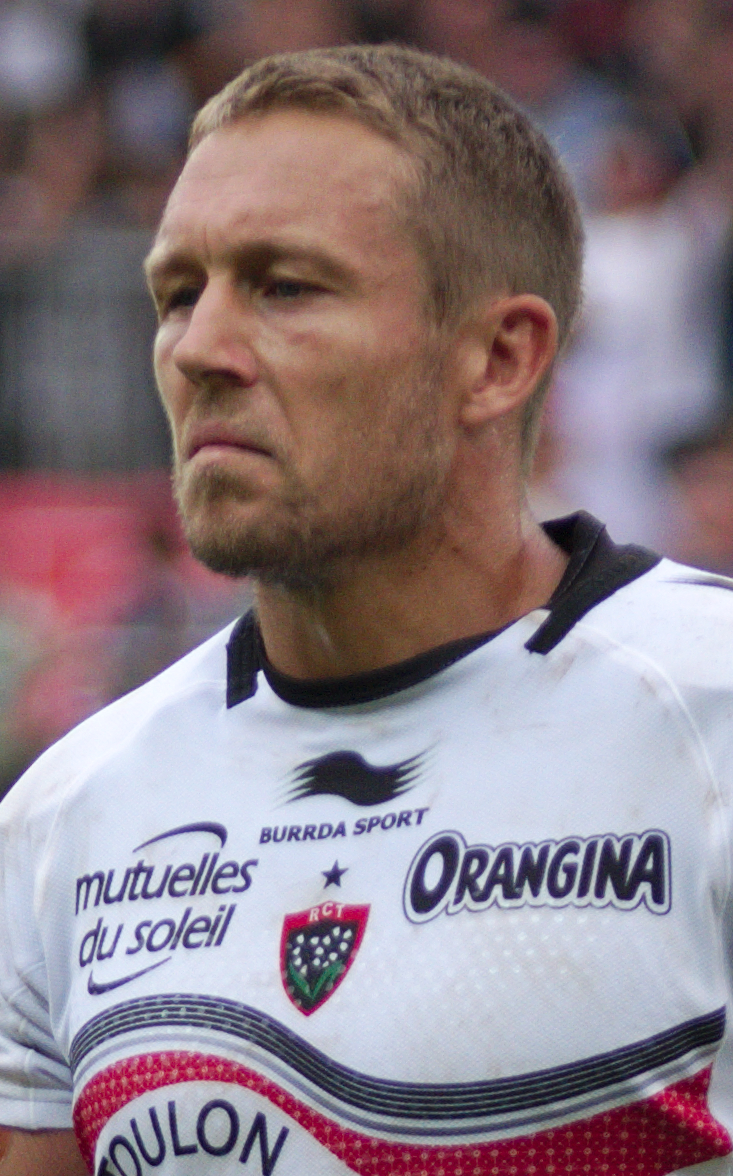
Using stars to represent trophy wins has spread to other sports: rugby union club Toulon are an example of this.

Occasionally, stars are temporarily added for one season, usually to commemorative kits to celebrate the anniversary of a particular event in the club's history. Burnley sported two stars on their 2006–07 shirt, for the club's 125th anniversary, to celebrate their two league titles in 1921 and 1960. Likewise Bury in 2009–10, also for their 125th anniversary, commemorating their 1900 and 1903 FA Cup triumphs; Bury have since revived the stars, from 2011 to 2012, after a season's absence. Commemorating anniversaries in this way is not confined to English clubs: Peruvian side Universitario celebrated their 90th anniversary by adding 26 stars to their kits worn home and away. This is not a practice limited to clubs, as in 2004, Denmark wore a star on their shirts specially for Euro 2004, to commemorate their victory in the competition in 1992.

In women's football, the emerging ad hoc standard is to wear stars on the sleeve instead of above the badge. Two of the four teams that have won the FIFA Women's World Cup to date – Norway and Germany – use this practice, as did three-time Women's World Cup winners, the USA, until moving the stars to the back collar in 2007. The United States returned its stars to above the badge on their new uniforms for the 2011 Women's World Cup, and have added a third and fourth star since their 2015 and 2019 FIFA Women's World Cup championships.

Boca Juniors of Argentina are noted for adding a star to their official badge for every major trophy won in the club's history, and currently have over 70 stars. However, the badge on the club shirts only features 52 stars due to space.

The practice of using stars to signify major titles has spread to other football codes, and to unrelated sports. For example, in 2009, Meath senior Gaelic football team began wearing seven stars on their jerseys, signifying their seven All-Ireland Senior Football Championships. In rugby union, Toulouse added a star above its badge in 2001 to signify its Heineken Cup win in 1996, added a second star immediately after winning the same competition in 2003 and a four more after winning in 2005, 2010, 2021 and 2024. In 2008 English rugby union side Bath Rugby also added a star on their shirt while Leinster Rugby added 2 stars after their second Heineken Cup win in 2011 and two more after winning in 2012 and 2019. English rugby union side Sale Sharks wear a gold star in tribute to their sole Premiership title. In basketball, the men's team of Indiana University Bloomington added five stars to its shorts, representing its five NCAA championships, for the 2015 NCAA tournament, and made the stars at that location a permanent fixture for the 2015–16 season. The Los Angeles Lakers of the National Basketball Association have 17 stars around the logo at center court for their 17 league titles, but do not wear stars on their uniforms. In intercontinental cricket competitions, the India national cricket team at one point featured three stars above their crest to represent its two ODI Cricket World Cup championships from 1983 and 2011 and one ICC Men's T20 World Cup championship from 2007. However, for the 2023 Cricket World Cup, the team opted to use a two star jersey because the third star represented a title from a T20 competition.

Other than stars, Royal Engineers A.F.C. adopted the FA Cup as their badge. Clapham Rovers badge written with "F.A. Cup winners 1880". F.C. Vado integrated the symbol of the Coppa Italia, the Coccarda, into their badge. Mercedes AMG Petronas F1 Team adopted Mercedes-Benz logo, Xelajú MC adopted crescents above their crest, NCAA basketball teams sponsored by Nike adopted a golden or silver patch while NBA team wear golden patch on the back collar with their number of titles won.

== List in football ==
Excluding the temporary stars, the following teams have chosen to add stars to their shirts:

=== National teams ===
==== Intercontinental (Football) ====
National team	Title(s) represented	First worn	Number of stars	Notes
FIFA World Cup
Brazil	World Cup	1971	5	Titles won in 1958, 1962, 1970, 1994 and 2002. Briefly wore 2 stars on a tour of Europe in 1968. Third star was added in 1971, the fourth star later in 1994 after the World Cup victory, and a fifth star in 2003 after the fifth championship.
Italy	World Cup	1982	4	Titles won in 1934, 1938, 1982 and 2006. Stars added after third win; fourth star added after the 2006 win. Incorporated into the badge from 2005 to 2017.
Germany	World Cup	1996	4	Titles won in 1954, 1974, 1990 and 2014. Stars first added during Euro 1996 qualification, representing wins in 1954, 1974 and 1990 (as "West Germany"). Worn above the badge. Fourth win was in 2014. The team first wore a four star jersey in a match against Argentina in September 2014.
Uruguay	World Cup and Olympics	1992	4 (2+2)	Titles won in 1930 and 1950. The four stars represent 2 Olympic football titles (1924 & 1928) and the 2 World Cups.
Argentina	World Cup	2004	3	Titles won in 1978, 1986 and 2022. The stars were added in 2004.
France	World Cup	1998	2	Titles won in 1998 and 2018. The first star that was added above their badge was unveiled at their opening qualifying game for Euro 2000.
Spain	World Cup	2010	2	Titles won in 2010 and 2026. Spain played in their away kit for the 2010 final, but upon winning the World Cup they changed into their home kit, complete with a star above the badge, for the presentation ceremony.
England	World Cup	2003	1	Title won in 1966. Star added in 2003 after a campaign on Sky Sports' Soccer AM programme, first worn on the sleeve.
FIFA Women’s World Cup
United States	Women's World Cup	1991	4	Worn on the chest, worn on the back collar between 2007 and 2011 and until early 2007 worn on the sleeve. Second star added following the victory in the 1999 World Cup. Third and fourth stars added following the back-to-back triumphs in the 2015 and 2019 World Cups.
Germany	Women's World Cup	2003	2	Until 2003 the three stars of the men's team had been worn. Second star added for their 2007 victory.
Norway	Women's World Cup	1995	1	Worn on the chest, worn on the sleeve until 2015.
Japan	Women's World Cup	2011	1	Title won in 2011. The star added above their badge has been worn since the Asian qualifying matches for the 2012 Women's Olympic tournament.
Spain	Women's World Cup	2023	1	Title won in 2023. The star added above their badge has been worn since the 2023–24 UEFA Women's Nations League.

==== Intercontinental (Futsal) ====
Currently, Brazil, Germany, Italy, England and Uruguay use the same logo as in football.

National Team	Title(s) represented	First worn	Number of stars	Notes
FIFA Futsal World Cup
Brazil	Futsal World Cup	1989	6	Titles won in 1989, 1992, 1996, 2008, 2012 and 2024
Spain	Futsal World Cup	2004	2	Titles won in 2000 and 2004.
Argentina	Futsal World Cup	2016	1	Title won in 2016.
Portugal	Futsal World Cup	2021	1	Title won in 2021.
FIFA Futsal Women's World Cup
Brazil	Futsal Women's World Cup	2025	1	Title won in 2025.

==== Intercontinental (Beach Soccer) ====
National Team	Title(s) represented	First worn	Number of stars	Notes
FIFA Beach Soccer World Cup
Brazil	Beach Soccer World Cup	2006	7	Titles won in 2006, 2007, 2008, 2009, 2017, 2024 and 2025
Russia	Beach Soccer World Cup	2013	3	Titles won in 2011, 2013 and 2021.
Portugal	Beach Soccer World Cup	2015	2	Titles won in 2015 and 2019.

==== Continental (Men) (Futsal) ====
National Team	Title(s) represented	First worn	Number of stars	Notes
Morocco	Africa Futsal Cup of Nations		1	

==== Intercontinental (Men) (AMF Futsal) ====
National Team	Title(s) represented	First worn	Number of stars	Notes
Brazil	AMF Futsal World Cup		2	
Paraguay	AMF Futsal World Cup		3	
Venezuela	AMF Futsal World Cup		1	

==== Intercontinental (Women) (AMF Futsal) ====
National Team	Title(s) represented	First worn	Number of stars	Notes
Catalonia	AMF Futsal World Cup		1	

==== Continental (football) ====
Current team jerseys that feature stars which represent continental champion may not necessarily mean a feature in a FIFA tournament. These jerseys have only been featured during World Cup qualifiers, continental competitions, and friendly matches.

National Team	Title(s) represented	First worn	Number of stars	Notes
Maldives	SAFF Championship	2021	2	Titles won in 2008 and 2018.
Iraq	Asian Cup	2021	1	Title won in 2007.
Qatar	Asian Cup	2021 Gold Cup	1	Title won in 2019.
Egypt	Africa Cup of Nations	1999	7	Titles won in 1957, 1959 (as "United Arab Republic"), 1986 and 1998. Subsequent stars added after their 2006, 2008 and 2010 triumphs. The star is also feature for beach soccer national team.
Cameroon	Africa Cup of Nations	2004	5	Titles won in 1984, 1988, 2000 and 2002. A fifth star was added after their 2017 victory.
Ivory Coast	Africa Cup of Nations	2008	3	Title won in 1992. Second star added after 2015 and 2023.
Algeria	Africa Cup of Nations	2009	2	Title won in 1990. Second star added after 2019 win.
DR Congo	Africa Cup of Nations	2008	2	Titles won in 1968 and 1974 (both as "Zaire").
Tunisia	Africa Cup of Nations	2008	1	Title won in 2004. Although the star did not feature at 2021 Africa Cup of Nations.
South Africa	Africa Cup of Nations	2013	1	Title won in 1996.
Sudan	Africa Cup of Nations	2022	1	Title won in 1970.
Ethiopia	Africa Cup of Nations	2022	1	Title won in 1962.
Zambia	Africa Cup of Nations	2024	1	Title won in 2012.
Senegal	Africa Cup of Nations	2024	1	Title won in 2021

==== Intercontinental (non-FIFA football) ====
National Team	Title(s) represented	First worn	Number of stars	Notes
Padania	Viva World Cup		3	2008, 2009, 2010
County of Nice	ConIFA World Football Cup		1	2014

==== Continental (Women) ====
National Team	Title(s) represented	First worn	Number of stars	Notes
Equatorial Guinea	Women's Africa Cup of Nations	2008	2	Titles won in 2008 and 2012.

==== Euros (football) ====
Only Denmark who won Euros 1992 have worn a star and only for the 2004 Euros held in Portugal.

=== Football clubs ===
==== OFC ====
Club Team	Country	Title(s) represented	Number of stars	Notes
Hekari United F.C.	Papua New Guinea	OFC Champions League	1	2008–09
Hienghène Sport	New Caledonia	New Caledonia Super Ligue	2	2017, 2019
A.S. Dragon (Tahiti)	Tahiti	Tahiti Ligue 1	3	2011–12, 2012–13, 2016–17.

==== AFC ====
Club Team	Country	Title(s) represented	Number of stars	Notes
Western Sydney Wanderers	Australia	AFC Champions League	1	Gold star for winning the 2014 AFC Champions League, introduced in 2015.
Brisbane Roar	Australia	A-League	1	Silver star (inscribed with the number 3) for winning the A-League three times, star added in 2015.
Newcastle Jets	Australia	A-League	1	Silver star for winning the A-League
Adelaide United	Australia	A-League	1	Silver star for winning the A-League.
South Melbourne FC	Australia	National Soccer League	4	
West Adelaide SC	Australia	National Soccer League	1	
Sydney Olympic FC	Australia	National Soccer League	2	1990, 2002
Adelaide City FC	Australia	National Soccer League	3	
APIA Leichhardt FC	Australia	National Soccer League	1	
Wollongong Wolves	Australia	National Soccer League, New South Wales state champions	4	Two gold stars for NSL victories in 2000 and 2001 and two silver stars for state-level titles in 1987 and 2008.
Bankstown City FC	Australia	NSW Premier League	4	1993, 1994, 2003/2004, 2004/2005
Darwin Olympic SC	Australia	NorZone Premier League	6	Each star represent premiers or champions.
Oakleigh Cannons FC	Australia	National Premier Leagues Victoria	4	
Bashundhara Kings	Bangladesh	Bangladesh Premier League (football)	2	
Preah Khan Reach Svay Rieng FC	Cambodia	Cambodian Premier League	2	
Shandong Luneng	China PR	Chinese Jia-A League, Chinese Super League	5	One title per star.
Shanghai SIPG	China PR	Chinese Super League	4	One title per star.
Guangzhou Evergrande	China PR	Chinese Super League, AFC Champions League	2 (8)	One star each for AFC Champions League and Chinese Super League; stars for the respective number of wins (two for ACL, seven for CSL) on sleeves.
Wuhan Three Towns	China PR	Chinese Super League	1	One title per star.
Beijing Guoan	China PR	Chinese Super League	1	One title per star.
Changchun Yatai	China PR	Chinese Super League	1	One title per star.
Shanghai Shenhua	China PR	Chinese Super League, Chinese Jia-A League	1	One title per star.
South China AA	Hong Kong	Hong Kong First Division League	4	Ten titles per star.
Eastern Sports Club	Hong Kong	Hong Kong First Division League	1	One title per star.
Bengaluru FC	India	I-League, Indian Super League	3	2013–14. 2015,16 I-League title and 2018–19 Indian Super League title
Gokulam Kerala FC	India	I-League	2	2020–21, 2021–22
Churchill Brothers FC Goa	India	I-League	2	2008–09, 2012–13
Hyderabad FC	India	Indian Super League	1	2021–22
Chennai City FC	India	I-League	1	2018–19 I-League title.
Aizawl F.C.	India	I-League	1	2016–17 I-League title.
Persib Bandung	Indonesia	Super League	5	One league title per star; Persib won one Premier Division title in 1995 and four Super League titles in 2014, 2024, 2025 and 2026
Persipura Jayapura	Indonesia	Super League	4	One league title per star; Persipura won one Premier Division title in 2005 and three Super League titles in 2009, 2011 and 2013.
Bali United	Indonesia	Super League	2	One league title per star; Bali won two Liga 1 titles in 2019 and 2021.
Persik Kediri	Indonesia	Super League	2	One league title per star; Persik won two Premier Division titles in 2003 and 2006.
Sriwijaya F.C.	Indonesia	Super League	2	One league title per star. Sriwijaya FC won one Premier Division title in 2008 and one Super League title in 2012, but the 2011–12 season was not organized by the Premier League or PSSI, causing internal conflict, meaning the "real" champions of 2011–12 are Semen Padang.
PSM Makassar	Indonesia	Super League	2	One league title per star; PSM won one Premier Division title in 1999-00 and one Liga 1 title in 2022–23.
Persija Jakarta	Indonesia	Perserikatan and Super League	1 (11)	Ten league title per star; Persija had nine Perserikatan titles, one Premier Division title in 2001, and one Liga 1 title in 2018.
PSIS Semarang	Indonesia	Super League	1	One league title per star; PSIS won one Premier Division title at 1998–99.
Bhayangkara Presisi Lampung	Indonesia	Super League	1	One league title per star; Bhayangkara won one Liga 1 title in 2017
Semen Padang	Indonesia	Super League	1	One league title per star; Semen Padang won one Premier League title in 2012.
Esteghlal	Iran	Asian Club Championship	2	For their Asian Club Championship triumphs.
PAS Hamedan	Iran	Asian Club Championship	1	A star for their Asian Club Championship triumph.
Persepolis	Iran	Iranian Football League	1	For their record ten championship titles won in Iranian Football League.
Al-Quwa Al-Jawiya	Iraq	AFC Cup	3	Consecutive titles in 2016, 2017 and 2018.
Al-Faisaly SC	Jordan	Jordanian Pro League	3	Each star represent 10 titles.
Gamba Osaka	Japan	AFC Champions League, AFC Champions League Two, J1 League, Emperor's Cup, J.League Cup	10	A star for each major title; the star for their sole AFC Champions League title is larger than the others.
Kashima Antlers	Japan	J1 League, J.League Cup, Emperor's Cup, AFC Champions League	2	A star for every ten major titles.
Nagoya Grampus	Japan	J1 League, Emperor's Cup, J.League Cup	5	A star for each major title.
Sanfrecce Hiroshima	Japan	J1 League, J.League Cup	5	A star for each major title.
Vissel Kobe	Japan	J1 League, Emperor's Cup	5	A star for each major title.
Yokohama F. Marinos	Japan	J1 League	5	A star for each J1 League title.
Kashiwa Reysol	Japan	J1 League, J.League Cup, Emperor's Cup	4	A star for each major title.
Urawa Red Diamonds	Japan	J1 League, AFC Champions League	4	A large star for each ACL title, a small star for each J1 League title.
Júbilo Iwata	Japan	J1 League	3	A star for each J1 League title.
Kawasaki Frontale	Japan	J1 League	3	A star for each major title.
Shonan Bellmare	Japan	J.League Cup, Asian Cup Winners' Cup, Emperor's Cup	3	A star for each major title.
Tokyo Verdy	Japan	J1 League	2	A star for each J1 League title.
Cerezo Osaka	Japan	J.League Cup, Emperor's Cup	2	A star for each major title.
JEF United Chiba	Japan	J.League Cup	2	A star for each J.League Cup title.
Kyoto Sanga	Japan	Emperor's Cup	1	A star for each Emperor's Cup title.
Machida Zelvia	Japan	Emperor's Cup	1	A star for each Emperor's Cup title.
Oita Trinita	Japan	J.League Cup	1	A star for each J.League Cup title.
Ventforet Kofu	Japan	Emperor's Cup	1	A star for each Emperor's Cup title.
Blaublitz Akita	Japan	J3 League	2	A star for each J3 League title.
Verspah Oita	Japan	Japan Football League	1	A star for each Japan Football League title.
Jeonbuk Hyundai Motors	Korea Republic	K League Classic	10	One title per star.
Seongnam Ilhwa Chunma	Korea Republic	K League Classic	7	One title per star; six stars introduced in 2003, with seventh star worn since 2007.
Pohang Steelers	Korea Republic	K League Classic	5	One title per star.
Busan IPark	Korea Republic	K League Classic	4	One title per star: four stars worn since 2010.
Suwon Samsung Bluewings	Korea Republic	K League Classic	4	One title per star: three stars introduced initially in 2005, with fourth star added in 2009.
Ulsan Hyundai	Korea Republic	K League Classic	2	One title per star; stars added in 1998.
Gimhae FC	Korea Republic	K3 League	1	One title per star.
Seoul United	Korea Republic	K3 League	1	One title per star.
Daejeon Korail FC	Korea Republic	Korea National League	2	One title per star.
Ulsan Citizen FC	Korea Republic	K3 League Basic	1	One title per star.
Paju Citizen FC	Korea Republic	K4 League	1	One title per star.
Yong In University	Korea Republic	U-League	4	U-League winner in 2015, 2018, other 2 stars are unknown.
Yeungnam University	Korea Republic	U-League	9	
Kuwait SC	Kuwait	Kuwait Premier League	3	Each star represent 5 titles
Al Ansar	Lebanon	Lebanese Premier League	1	Represents ten titles.
Windsor Arch Ka I	Macau	Liga de Elite	3	2010, 2011, 2012
Kelantan Red Warrior F.C.	Malaysia	Malaysian Super League	2	One title per star; represents the defunct state based club Kelantan F.C. honours
Johor Darul Ta'zim F.C.	Malaysia	Malaysian Super League	3	Stars were added in 2013 without any meaning until 2016 after JDT won three national titles. The three stars were described by owner of the team Crown Prince of Johor Tunku Ismail Idris as the only person to adopt 3 stars at the badge before winning any trophy.
FC Ulaanbaatar	Mongolia	Mongolian National Premier League	1	Represents titles won in 2011.
Ulaanbaatar City FC	Mongolia	Mongolian National Premier League	1	Represents titles won in 2019.
Dhofar Club	Oman	Oman Professional League	1	1 star represent 10 titles
Al-Sadd	Qatar	AFC Champions League	2	A star for each AFC Champions League triumph.
Al Hilal	Saudi Arabia	AFC Champions League, Asian Cup Winners' Cup, Asian Super Cup	7	A star for each AFC Champions League, Asian Cup Winners' Cup and Asian Super Cup triumph.
Warriors FC	Singapore	Singapore Premier League	5	
Albirex Niigata Singapore FC	Singapore	Singapore Premier League	4	Titles won in 2016, 2017, 2018, 2020.
Geylang International FC	Singapore	Singapore Premier League	2	Titles won in 1996, 2001.
Tishreen SC	Syria	Syrian Premier League	5	A star for each league title.
Tainan City F.C.	Taiwan	Taiwan Football Premier League	2	2020, 2021
Buriram United F.C.	Thailand	Thai League 1 Thai FA Cup and Thai League Cup	1	Treble titles won in 2011. The club did not add any more star.
Chiangrai United F.C.	Thailand	Thai League 1	1	2019
Bangkok United F.C.	Thailand	Thai League 1	1	2006
Al-Ahli (Dubai)	United Arab Emirates	UAE Pro League	2	Two stars for their ten championship titles in the UAE League: seven with Al-Ahli Dubai FC and three with Al Shabab Al Arabi Club Dubai.
Al-Ain	United Arab Emirates	UAE Pro League	1	Represents ten titles; star worn since 2012.
Sharjah FC	United Arab Emirates	UAE Pro League	1	Represents five titles.
Pakhtakor	Uzbekistan	Uzbekistan League	2	Each star represents five titles.
Bunyodkor	Uzbekistan	Uzbekistan League	1	Represents five titles.
Neftchi Fergana	Uzbekistan	Uzbekistan League	1	Represents five titles.
Quảng Nam FC	Vietnam	V.League 1	1	2017
Hoàng Anh Gia Lai FC	Vietnam	V.League 1	2	2003, 2004
Long An FC	Vietnam	V.League 1	2	2005, 2006
SHB Đà Nẵng FC	Vietnam	V.League 1	3	1992, 2009, 2012
Hanoi FC	Vietnam	V.League 1	6	2010, 2013, 2016, 2018, 2019, 2022
Becamex Bình Dương FC	Vietnam	V.League 1, Vietnamese National Football Cup	7 (4+3)	2007, 2008, 2014, 2015. 1994, 2015, 2018

==== AFC (Japanese boys Secondary School) ====
Club Team	Country	Title(s) represented	Number of stars	Notes
Aomori Yamada	Japan	All Japan Secondary School Soccer Tournament	5	2012, 2014, 2015, 2016, 2017

==== AFC (Japanese boys High School) ====
Club Team	Country	Title(s) represented	Number of stars	Notes
Yamanashi Gakuin	Japan	All Japan High School Soccer Tournament Inter High School Sports Festival	2	2009 All Japan High School Soccer Tournament. 2018 Inter High School Sports Festival
Aomori Yamada	Japan	All Japan High School Soccer Tournament Prince Takamado Cup Inter High School Sports Festival	7	2005 Inter High School Sports Festival. 2016, 2018 All Japan High School Soccer Tournament. 2016, 2019 Prince Takamado Cup.
Ichiritsu Funabashi	Japan	All Japan High School Soccer Tournament	5	1994, 1996, 1999, 2002, 2011
Ishikawa Seiryo	Japan	All Japan High School Soccer Tournament	1	2014
Ichiritsu Urawa	Japan	All Japan High School Soccer Tournament	4	1972, 1964, 1960, 1959
Itabashi Teikyo	Japan	All Japan High School Soccer Tournament	9	All Japan High School Soccer Tournament in .1974, 1977, 1979, 1983, 1984, 1991. Inter High School Sports Festival in 1976, 1982, 2002.
Kansai Hokuyo	Japan	All Japan High School Soccer Tournament	2	1973 All Japan High School Soccer Tournament, 1978 Inter High School Sports Festival.
Shiga Yasu	Japan	All Japan High School Soccer Tournament	1	2005
Higashi Fukuoka	Japan	All Japan High School Soccer Tournament	7	
Morioka Shogyo	Japan	All Japan High School Soccer Tournament	1	2006
Toyama Daiichi	Japan	All Japan High School Soccer Tournament	1	2013
Miyazaki Hōshō	Japan	All Japan High School Soccer Tournament	1	2012
Ryutsu Keizai Kashiwa	Japan	All Japan High School Soccer Tournament Inter High School Sports Festival Prince Takamado Cup	5	All Japan High School Soccer Tournament in 2007. Inter High School Sports Festival champion in 2008, 2017. Prince Takamado Cup in 2007, 2013
Hiroshima Kanon	Japan	Inter High School Sports Festival	1	Inter High School Sports Festival in 2006.
Hyōgo Prefecture Youth	Japan	All Japan High School Soccer Tournament youth football tournament	2	1982, 2012
Chiba Prefecture Youth	Japan	All Japan High School Soccer Tournament youth football tournament	8	1990, 1995, 1998, 1999, 2002, 2005, 2006, 2011

==== AFC (Japanese University) ====
Club Team	Country	Title(s) represented	Number of stars	Notes
Ryutsu Keizai University FC	Japan	Regional and nationwide titles	9	
Kansai University	Japan	Regional and nationwide titles	5	
Osaka University of Health and Sport Sciences	Japan	Regional and nationwide titles	5	
Fukuoka University	Japan	Prime Minister Cup	1	2009

==== CAF ====
Club Team	Country	Title(s) represented	Number of stars	Notes
JS Kabylie	Algeria	Various African titles	7	Two CAF Champions Leagues (1981, 1990), (Note: The CAF Champions League was known as the African Cup of Champions Clubs prior to 1997.) three CAF Cups (2000, 2001, 2002), one African Cup Winners' Cup (1995) and one CAF Super Cup (1982).
ES Sétif	Algeria	CAF Champions League	2	Two CAF Champions League (1988, 2014)
USM Alger	Algeria	CAF Confederation Cup, CAF Super Cup	4	CAF Champions League Titles won in 2023 and 2026, CAF Super Cup Titles won in 2023 and 2026.
MC Alger	Algeria	CAF Champions League	1	Title won in 1976.
CR Belouizdad	Algeria	Algerian Ligue Professionnelle 1	1	One star represent 10 titles
Canon Yaoundé	Cameroon	CAF Champions League African Cup Winners' Cup	4	CAF Champions League titles won in 1971, 1978 and 1980. African Cup Winners' Cup title won in 1979.
Union Douala	Cameroon	CAF Champions League	2 (1 above + 1 below)	One star for CAF Champions League won in 1979, and one star for African Cup Winners' Cup won in 1981.
TP Mazembe	Democratic Republic of the Congo	CAF Champions League, Linafoot	5 (1 above + 4 below)	Represents ten titles and four CAF Champions Leagues (1967, 1968, 2009, 2010).
AS Vita Club	Democratic Republic of the Congo	CAF Champions League	1	Title won in 1973.
Al Ahly	Egypt	Egyptian League, CAF Champions League	14 (4 above + 10 below)	Four stars above club's badge, represents forty-two Egyptian Premier League titles; Ten stars under club's badge, represents 10 CAF Champions League titles (1982, 1987, 2001, 2005, 2006, 2008, 2012, 2013, 2020, and 2021).
Ismaily SC	Egypt	CAF Champions League	1	Title won in 1969.
Pyramids FC	Egypt	CAF Champions League	1	Title won in 2025.
Al Ittihad Alexandria Club	Egypt	Egypt Cup	6	Each star represents one title; Titles won in 1926, 1936, 1948, 1963, 1973, 1976.
ENPPI SC	Egypt	Egypt Cup	2	Titles won in 2005 and 2011.
El Sekka El Hadid SC	Egypt	Sultan Hussein Cup, Cairo League	4	Sultan Hussein Cup in 1923–24, 1935–36, Cairo League in 1923–24, 1935–36
Hafia FC	Guinea	CAF Champions League	3	Titles won in 1972, 1975 and 1977.
Horoya AC	Guinea	African Cup Winners' Cup	1	Title won in 1979
AS Kaloum Star	Guinea	Guinée Championnat National	1	1 star represent 10 titles.
ASEC Mimosas	Ivory Coast	CAF Champions League	1	Title won in 1998.
Stade d'Abidjan	Ivory Coast	CAF Champions League	1	Title won in 1966.
Séwé FC	Ivory Coast	Côte d'Ivoire Premier Division	3	Titles won in 2011–12, 2012–13, 2013–14.
Stella Club d'Adjamé	Ivory Coast	Côte d'Ivoire Premier Division	3	Titles won in 1979, 1981, 1984.
Al-Ittihad	Libya	Libyan Premier League	1	Awarded star after winning tenth Libyan Premier League title in 2002–03.
Al Ahli SC (Tripoli)	Libya	Libyan Premier League	1	One star represent 10 titles
Al-Ahly SC (Benghazi)	Libya	Libyan Premier League	1	Al-Ahly SC (Benghazi) is the only club in Libya which has a star in its badge before reaching 10 league titles.
AS Adema	Madagascar	Malagasy Pro League	3	Titles won in 2002, 2006, and 2012.
Raja Casablanca	Morocco	CAF Champions League, Botola	4 (1 above + 3 below)	Represents ten titles, and three CAF Champions Leagues (1989, 1997, 1999).
FAR Rabat	Morocco	Botola	1	Represents ten titles.
Wydad Casablanca	Morocco	Botola, CAF Champions League	5	Represents twenty titles, and three CAF Champions Leagues (1992, 2017, 2022).
Kawkab Marrakech	Morocco	CAF Cup	1	Title won in 1996.
Enyimba	Nigeria	CAF Champions League	2	Titles won in 2003 and 2004.
Kano Pillars F.C.	Nigeria	Nigeria Professional Football League	4	Titles won in 2007–08, 2011–12, 2013, and 2014.
CARA Brazzaville	Republic of the Congo	CAF Champions League	1	Title won in 1974.
Kaizer Chiefs	South Africa	South African League"NSL/PSL", African Cup Winners' Cup	2	Represents ten+ League titles and one African Cup Winners' Cup Title won in 2001.
Mamelodi Sundowns	South Africa	CAF Champions League	2	Title won in 2016.
Orlando Pirates	South Africa	CAF Champions League	1	Title won in 1995.
Espérance de Tunis	Tunisia	Tunisian Ligue	7 (3 above + 4 below)	Represents thirty titles, and four CAF Champions Leagues (1994, 2011, 2018, 2019).
Club Africain	Tunisia	Tunisian Ligue	1	Represents ten titles.
ÉS Sahel	Tunisia	Tunisian Ligue	1	Represents ten titles.
JS Saint-Pierroise	France (Réunion)	Réunion Premier League	2	Represents ten titles.
AS Saint-Louisienne	France (Réunion)	Réunion Premier League	1	Represents ten titles.

==== CONCACAF (United States) ====
Club Team	Country	Title(s) represented	Number of stars	Notes
Minnesota United FC	United States	North American Soccer League championship	1	Title won in 2011.
LA Galaxy	United States	MLS Cup	6	5 Silver stars and 1 gold for six MLS Cup Titles won, start from 2019. Previously wore a gold star to symbolize their five MLS Cup titles.
D.C. United	United States	MLS Cup	4	Titles won in 1996, 1997, 1999 and 2004.
Columbus Crew	United States	MLS Cup	3	Titles won in 2008, 2020, and 2023.
Seattle Sounders FC	United States	MLS Cup	2	Titles won in 2016 and 2019.
Houston Dynamo FC	United States	MLS Cup	2	Titles won in 2006 and 2007.
San Jose Earthquakes	United States	MLS Cup	2	Titles won in 2001 and 2003; (Note: Although the Earthquakes moved and became the Houston Dynamo, that team forfeited the history of the Earthquakes and became an effective expansion team, with the new Earthquakes rejoining in 2008 with the original team's identity and permission to use two sanctioned stars, similarly to the relationship between the Cleveland Browns and Baltimore Ravens in American football.)
Sporting Kansas City	United States	MLS Cup	2	Titles won in 2000 (as Kansas City Wizards) and 2013 (as Sporting Kansas City).
Chicago Fire	United States	MLS Cup	1	Title won in 1998.
Real Salt Lake	United States	MLS Cup	1	Title won in 2009.
Colorado Rapids	United States	MLS Cup	1	Title won in 2010.
Atlanta United FC	United States	MLS Cup	1	Title won in 2018.
New York City FC	United States	MLS Cup	1	Title won in 2021.
Portland Timbers	United States	MLS Cup	1	Title won in 2015, star featured on 2016 change jersey.
Los Angeles FC	United States	MLS Cup	1	Title won in 2022.
Inter Miami CF	United States	MLS Cup	1	Title won in 2025.
Detroit City FC	United States	National Independent Soccer Association	1	Title won in 2020–21 season.
Orange County SC	United States	USL Championship	1	Title won in 2021.
San Antonio FC	United States	USL Championship	1	Title won in 2022.
Phoenix Rising FC	United States	USL Championship	1	Title won in 2023.
Colorado Springs Switchbacks FC	United States	USL Championship	1	Title won in 2024.
Pittsburgh Riverhounds SC	United States	USL Championship	1	Title won in 2025.
Union Omaha	United States	USL League One	2	Title won in 2021 and 2024.
North Texas SC	United States	USL League One	1	Title won in 2019.
Greenville Triumph SC	United States	USL League One	1	Title won in 2020.
South Georgia Tormenta FC	United States	USL League One	1	Title won in 2022.
North Carolina FC	United States	USL League One	1	Title won in 2023
Flint City Bucks	United States	USL League Two	4	Titles won in 2006, 2014, 2016, 2019.
Charlotte Eagles	United States	USL League Two	3	Titles won in 2000, 2005, and 2017.
Des Moines Menace	United States	USL League Two	2	Title won in 2005 and 2021.
Portland Timbers U23s	United States	USL League Two	1	Title won in 2010.
Laredo Heat	United States	USL League Two	1	Title won in 2007.
New York Red Bulls II	United States	USL Cup	1	Title won in 2016.
Louisville City FC	United States	USL Cup	2	Representing the back-to-back USL Cup Championships won in 2017 and 2018.
Real Monarchs	United States	USL Cup	1	Title won in 2019.
Sonoma County Sol	United States	National Premier Soccer League	1	
Sacramento Gold FC	United States	National Premier Soccer League	1	
Tampa Bay Rowdies	United States	North American Soccer League championships	2	The team, which began play in 2010 as FC Tampa Bay in the D2 Pro League and now plays in the USL Championship added the first star to represent the Soccer Bowl, the championship of the original North American Soccer League, won by the original Tampa Bay Rowdies in 1975; a second star was added after the new club won Soccer Bowl 2012, the championship of the second NASL.
Rochester Rhinos	United States	A-League, U.S. Open Cup, United Soccer League	5	Four titles won in four seasons: their first championship was the A-League in 1998; victory in the 1999 U.S. Open Cup, before the Rhinos picked up successive A-League titles in 2000 and 2001; four stars were added in 2013. fifth star added in 2015.
RWB Adria	United States	National Amateur Cup	2	
Milwaukee Bavarian SC	United States	National Amateur Cup	8	
Christos FC	United States	National Amateur Cup	6	

==== CONCACAF (United States college soccer) ====
Club Team	Country	Title(s) represented	Number of stars	Notes
Tufts Jumbos	United States	NCAA Division III Men's Soccer Championship	3	
Trinity Tigers	United States	NCAA Division III Men's Soccer Championship	1	
Messiah University	United States	NCAA Division III Men's Soccer Championship	11	
Ohio Wesleyan Battling Bishops	United States	NCAA Division III Men's Soccer Championship	2	
Florida Tech Panthers	United States	NCAA Division II Men's Soccer Championship	2	1988, 1991
Cal State Dominguez Hills Toros	United States	NCAA Division II Men's Soccer Championship	2	2000, 2008
Fort Lewis Skyhawks	United States	NCAA Division II Men's Soccer Championship	3	2005, 2009, 2011
Southern Connecticut Owls	United States	NCAA Division II Men's Soccer Championship	6	1987, 1990, 1992, 1995, 1998, 1999
Pfeiffer Falcons	United States	NCAA Division II Men's Soccer Championship	1	2015
Lynn Fighting Knights	United States	NCAA Division II Men's Soccer Championship	4	
Akron Zips men's soccer	United States	NCAA Division I Men's Soccer Tournament	1	Represents 2010 NCAA Division I Men's Soccer Championship.
Virginia Cavaliers men's soccer	United States	NCAA Division I Men's Soccer Tournament	7	
Saint Louis Billikens men's soccer	United States	NCAA Division I Men's Soccer Tournament	10	
Indiana Hoosiers men's soccer	United States	NCAA Division I Men's Soccer Tournament	8	
UConn Huskies men's soccer	United States	NCAA Division I Men's Soccer Tournament	3	1948, 1981, 2000. The stars are located at the sleeve.
Stanford Cardinal men's soccer	United States	NCAA Division I Men's Soccer Tournament	3	2015, 2016, 2017. The stars are located at the sleeve.
Clemson Tigers men's soccer	United States	NCAA Division I Men's Soccer Tournament	2	
North Carolina Tar Heels men's soccer	United States	NCAA Division I Men's Soccer Tournament	2	Stars are at back of shirt.
San Francisco Dons men's soccer	United States	NCAA Division I Men's Soccer Tournament	6	
Navy Midshipmen men's soccer	United States	NCAA Division I Men's Soccer Tournament	1	
Hartwick Hawks men's soccer	United States	NCAA Division I Men's Soccer Tournament	1	
UC Santa Barbara Gauchos men's soccer	United States	NCAA Division I Men's Soccer Tournament	1	2006
Georgetown Hoyas men's soccer	United States	NCAA Division I Men's Soccer Tournament	1	2019
Marshall Thundering Herd men's soccer	United States	NCAA Division I Men's Soccer Tournament	1	2020
Drexel Dragons men's soccer	United States	Intercollegiate Soccer Football Association national champion	1	1958
Hastings College	United States	NAIA Men's Soccer Championship	2	2010, 2016
Westmont College	United States	NAIA Men's Soccer Championship	1	1972
Bethel University (Tennessee)	United States	NAIA Men's Soccer Championship	1	2008
Missouri Valley College	United States	NAIA Men's Soccer Championship	1	2020
University of Rio Grande	United States	NAIA Men's Soccer Championship	1	2003, 2015
Lindsey Wilson College	United States	NAIA Men's Soccer Championship	9	1995, 1996, 1998, 1999, 2000, 2001, 2005, 2009, 2011

==== CONCACAF (United States high school) ====
Club Team	Country	Title(s) represented	Number of stars	Notes
Juan Diego Catholic High School	United States	Utah state championship	1	
Dixie High School (Utah)	United States	Utah state championship	1	
Wasatch High School	United States	Utah state championship	1	

==== CONCACAF ====
Club Team	Country	Title(s) represented	Number of stars	Notes
SV Racing Club Aruba	Aruba	Aruban Division di Honor	3	One star represent 5 titles.
SV Deportivo Nacional	Aruba	Aruban Division di Honor	5	One star represent 1 titles.
San Pedro Pirates FC	Belize	Premier League of Belize	1	2019.
Toronto FC	Canada	MLS Cup	1	Title won in 2017.
Pacific FC	Canada	North Star Cup	1	Title won in 2021. Badge is worn on the back of the jersey between the collar and player name.
FC London	Canada	USL League Two	2	Title won in 2012.
CS Mont-Royal Outremont	Canada	Première Ligue de soccer du Québec	3	
Saprissa	Costa Rica	CONCACAF Champions League	3	The stars are located at the sleeve.
C.S. Cartaginés	Costa Rica	Costa Rican league CONCACAF Champions League	4	One star per national league title. One star per continental title.
A.D. San Carlos	Costa Rica	Costa Rican league	1	One star per national league title.
Orión F.C.	Costa Rica	Costa Rican league	2	One star per national league title.
La U Universitarios	Costa Rica	Costa Rican league	1	One star per national league title.
Jong Colombia	Curaçao	CONCACAF Champions' Cup (Caribbean Zone) and Sekshon Pagá.	3 (2+1)	Two stars for CONCACAF Champions League (Caribbean Zone) titles (1967 and 1979) and one star for at least ten league titles.
Atlético Pantoja	Dominican Republic	Various national and international titles	5	Caribbean Club Championship in 2018, Liga Dominicana de Fútbol in 2015, 2019, Apertura in 2019, Supercopa Liga Dominicana de Fútbol in 2020
Cibao FC	Dominican Republic	Liga Mayor	1	Champion in 2018 Liga Dominicana de Fútbol.
Universidad Dominicana O&M	Dominican Republic	Liga Mayor	1	2020
A.D. Isidro Metapán	El Salvador	La Primera	10	Star for each national title won.
Santa Tecla F.C.	El Salvador	La Primera	4	Star for each national title won.
Quequeisque F.C.	El Salvador	La Primera	5	Star for each national title won.
Firpo	El Salvador	La Primera	9	Star for each national title won.
C.D. Atlético Marte	El Salvador	La Primera	8	Star for each national title won.
C.D. Dragón	El Salvador	La Primera	3	Star for each national title won
Cobán Imperial	Guatemala	Liga Nacional de Fútbol de Guatemala	1	
Club Xelajú MC	Guatemala	Liga Nacional de Fútbol de Guatemala	5	Represent as moon
C.D. Guastatoya	Guatemala	Liga Nacional de Fútbol de Guatemala	3	
Antigua GFC	Guatemala	Liga Nacional de Fútbol de Guatemala	4	
FC Santa Lucía Cotzumalguapa	Guatemala	Liga Nacional de Fútbol de Guatemala	1	Clausura 2021
C.D. Malacateco	Guatemala	Liga Nacional de Fútbol de Guatemala	4	Apertura 2021
Arcahaie FC	Haiti	Ligue Haïtienne	1	2020
Platense F.C.	Honduras	Liga Nacional de Fútbol Profesional de Honduras	2	
Juticalpa F.C.	Honduras	Honduran Cup	1	
Club Deportivo y Social Vida	Honduras	Liga Nacional de Fútbol Profesional de Honduras	2	
Harbour View F.C.	Jamaica	National Premier League	4	
Cavalier F.C.	Jamaica	National Premier League	1	
Real Estelí	Nicaragua	Nicaraguan Primera División	4	First two national championships won by the club (in 1991 and 1999).
Managua FC	Nicaragua	Nicaraguan Primera División	1	Apertura 2018
C.D. Walter Ferretti	Nicaragua	Nicaraguan Primera División	4	
Diriangén FC	Nicaragua	Nicaraguan Primera División	26	
Tauro F.C.	Panama	Liga Panameña de Fútbol	1	Represents ten titles.
C.A. Independiente de La Chorrera	Panama	Liga Panameña de Fútbol	3	
Sporting San Miguelito	Panama	Liga Panameña de Fútbol	1	
S.V. Transvaal	Suriname	CONCACAF Champions League and SVB Topklasse.	3 (2+1)	Two stars for CONCACAF Champions League titles and one star for at least ten league titles.
Defence Force F.C.	Trinidad and Tobago	CONCACAF Champions League, CFU Club Championship and TT Pro League.	4 (2+1+1)	Two stars for CONCACAF Champions League titles, one star for CFU Club Championship and one star for at least ten league titles.
Golden Lion FC	Martinique	Martinique Championnat National	5	

==== CONCACAF (Mexico) ====
Club Team	Country	Title(s) represented	Number of stars	Notes
Deportivo Toluca F.C.	Mexico	Mexican First Division	12	One star per league title.
Pachuca	Mexico	Mexican First Division, CONCACAF Champions League, Copa Sudamericana	13 (7 above + 6 below)	One star per league title; six gold stars for continental trophies: five stars for CONCACAF Champions League titles, and one star for its Copa Sudamericana title.
León	Mexico	Mexican First Division	8	One star per title.
Monterrey	Mexico	Mexican First Division + CONCACAF Champions League	10 (5 above + 5 below)	Five silver stars above for league titles. Five gold stars below for CONCACAF Champions League titles.
UANL	Mexico	Mexican First Division	7	One star per league title.
Santos Laguna	Mexico	Mexican First Division	6	One star per title.
Atlante	Mexico	Mexican First Division	3	One star per title.
Necaxa	Mexico	Mexican First Division	3	One star per title.
Tampico	Mexico	Mexican First Division	1	One star per title.
Puebla	Mexico	Mexican First Division and Mexican Cup	7 (2 inside + 5 outside)	Two gold stars incorporated into crest for league titles. Five blue stars outside for cup titles.
Veracruz	Mexico	Mexican First Division	2	Titles won in 1946 and 1950.
Atlas	Mexico	Mexican First Division	3	Titles won in 1951, Apertura 2021 and Clausura 2022.
Tecos	Mexico	Mexican First Division	1	Title won in 1994.
Tijuana	Mexico	Mexican First Division	1	Title won in 2012.
Oro	Mexico	Mexican First Division	1	One star per title.
Murciélagos	Mexico	Mexican Third Division	1	Title won in 2012.
Alacranes de Durango	Mexico	Mexican Third Division	4	Invierno 1998, Verano 1999, Apertura 2021, and Clausura 2013
Celaya	Mexico	Mexican Division Promotion	2	One star per division promotion.
Tepatitlán F.C.	Mexico	Liga de Expansión MX	1	Title won in 2021.
Cancún F.C.	Mexico	Liga de Expansión MX	1	Title won in 2024.
Mineros de Fresnillo F.C.	Mexico	Mexican Third Division	2	Segunda Serie B Apertura 2014, Ascenso Serie B 2014/2015
Sahuayo F.C.	Mexico	Mexican Third Division	1	Clausura 2013
Pioneros de Cancún	Mexico	Mexican Third Division	1	2013–14
Acatlán F.C.	Mexico	Mexican Fourth Division	1	2017–18
Ecatepec Fútbol Club	Mexico	Mexican Fourth Division	1	1987–88
Deportivo Zitácuaro	Mexico	Mexican Third Division Mexican Fourth Division	3	Third division Invierno 1997, Verano 2001, fourth division 1995/1996
Cafetaleros de Chiapas	Mexico	Mexican Second Division	1	Clausura 2018
Alebrijes de Oaxaca	Mexico	Mexican Second Division	2	Apertura 2017, Apertura 2019
Héroes de Zaci	Mexico	Liga TDP	1	2018–19
Aguacateros C.D. Uruapan	Mexico	Serie B de México	1	Apertura 2021

==== CONIFA North America & Caribbean ====
Club Team	Country	Title(s) represented	Number of stars	Notes
Chapulineros de Oaxaca	Mexico	Liga de Balompié Mexicano	2	2020–21 and 2021. The competition is sanctioned by CONIFA instead of Mexican Football Federation.

==== CONMEBOL (Argentina) ====
Club Team	Country	Title(s) represented	Number of stars	Notes
Arsenal de Sarandí	Argentina	Various National and International titles	5	Copa Sudamericana 2007, J.League Cup / Copa Sudamericana Championship 2008, Primera División 2012 Clausura, Supercopa Argentina 2012, Copa Argentina 2012–13
Defensa y Justicia	Argentina	Copa Sudamericana, Recopa Sudamericana	2	For 2020 Copa Sudamericana and then 2021 Recopa Sudamericana.
Club Atlético Tigre	Argentina	Copa de la Superliga	1	Title won in 2019.
Huracán	Argentina	Various National Titles	13	5 Stars above badge for every league wins, 8 Stars below badge for every national cup wins. Argentine Primera División won in 1921, 1922, 1925, 1928, and 1973. Copa Estímulo won in 1920. Copa Dr. Carlos Ibarguren won in 1922 and 1925. Copa Adrián C. Escobar won in 1942 and 1943. Copa de Competencia Británica won in 1944. Copa Argentina won in 2013–14. Supercopa Argentina won in 2014.
Argentinos Juniors	Argentina	Argentine League, Copa Libertadores, and Interamerican Cup	5	Three Argentine League; 1985 Copa Libertadores, and 1986 Interamerican Cup
Estudiantes (LP)	Argentina	Argentine League, Copa Libertadores, and Intercontinental Cup	11	Five Argentine league titles; four Copa Libertadores; 1968 Intercontinental and 1969 Interamerican Cups; an earlier badge had just four stars, for the Libertadores and Intercontinental titles; tenth star added after 2009 Copa Libertadores victory.
Rosario Central	Argentina	Argentine league and CONMEBOL Cup	6 (4+1+1)	The middle star, for the CONMEBOL Cup, is larger. The previous badge had five blue stars and one larger yellow star; the extra small star was for the unofficial "1974 Argentinian Championship", a qualification playoff for the 1974 Copa Libertadores.
Newell's Old Boys	Argentina	Argentine league	7	One star per title, including one each for the 1990 Apertura and the 1990/91 Apertura/Clausura playoff.
Argentinos Juniors	Argentina	Argentine League, Copa Libertadores, and Interamerican Cup	5	Three Argentine League; 1985 Libertadores and 1986 Interamerican Cup
Lanús	Argentina	Argentine League, Copa Bicentenario, Supercopa Argentina, Copa Juan Domingo Perón, Copa Sudamericana, Copa CONMEBOL, Recopa Sudamericana	9	Two Argentine League (2007 and 2016); 2016 Copa Bicentenario, 2016 Supercopa Argentina, 1955 Copa Juan Domingo Perón, 2013 Copa Sudamericana, and 1996 Copa CONMEBOL.
Boca Juniors	Argentina	Various Titles	72	The club has a policy of adding a star to their badge since 1970 for each title won ever (except during 2007–2009, when a design with only three stars was used for each Intercontinental Cup won); however, the version of the club badge on the shirts provided by kit manufacturer Nike remains on 52 stars as of 2019.
Quilmes AC	Argentina	Argentine league and Copa de Honor	3	For amateur titles of 1912 and 1978 Metropolitano
Ferro Carril Oeste	Argentina	Argentine league	2	For 1982 Nacional and 1984 Nacional
Banfield	Argentina	Argentine league and Copa de Honor	2	For 2009 Torneo Apertura and 1920 amateur Copa de Honor.
Racing Club de Avellaneda	Argentina	Intercontinental Cup	1	Title won in 1967. The star is located at the bottom of kit.
Vélez Sarsfield	Argentina	Intercontinental Cup	1	Title won in 1994.
Talleres de Córdoba	Argentina	Copa CONMEBOL, Supercopa Internacional	2	Title won in 1999 and 2023 Supercopa Internacional
Chacarita Juniors	Argentina	Argentine league	1	For 1969 Metropolitano.
Gimnasia y Esgrima La Plata	Argentina	Argentine league	2	Argentine Primera División 1969, Copa Centenario de la AFA 1993
Sportivo Dock Sud	Argentina	Argentine league	1	Title won in 1933.
Club Atlético Porteño	Argentina	Argentine league	2	1912 FAF, 1914 FAF
Club Atlético Colón	Argentina	Copa de la Liga Profesional (national cup)	1	Title won in 2021.
Club Atlético Patronato	Argentina	Copa Argentina (national cup)	1	Title won in 2022.
Central Córdoba (SdE)	Argentina	Copa Argentina (national cup)	1	Title won in 2024.
Independiente Rivadavia	Argentina	Copa Argentina (national cup)	1	Title won in 2025.
Belgrano	Argentina	Primera División	1	Title won in 2026
Platense	Argentina	Primera División	1	Title won in 2025
Atlético Tucumán	Argentina	Copa de Campeones de la República Argentina (national cup)	1	1960
Club Atlético Nueva Chicago	Argentina	Copa de Competencia Jockey Club	1	1933
San Martín de Tucumán	Argentina	Copa General Pedro Ramírez	1	1944
Club Atlético Atlanta	Argentina	Copa Suecia	1	1958
Club Atlético Sarmiento	Argentina	Various national competitions	5	B Nacional 2020. Primera B 1980, 2003–04, 2011–12. Primera C 1977.
Sacachispas Fútbol Club	Argentina	Various national competitions	4	Primera C 2016–17, Primera D 1954, 1999–00, 2002–03
Club Atlético Villa San Carlos	Argentina	Primera Nacional, Primera C, Primera D	4	Primera B 2012–13, Primera C 2008–09 Primera D 1992–93, 2001–02
CA Excursionistas	Argentina	Argentine División Intermedia	1	1924
Deportivo Laferrere	Argentina	Primera C	4	Primera C won in 1986–87 and 2001–02, 2 stars are unknown.
UAI Urquiza	Argentina	Primera C, Primera D	2	Primera D won in 2009–10, Primera C won in 2012–13.
Club Ferrocarril Midland	Argentina	Primera D	3	1968, 1988–89, 2008–09
Argentino de Merlo	Argentina	Primera D	3	1985, 1998–99, 2018–19
Club Atlético Claypole	Argentina	Primera D	2	1996–97, 2020
Deportivo Paraguayo	Argentina	Primera D	1	1991–92
Central Ballester	Argentina	Primera D	1	1995–96
Almirante Brown	Argentina	Various national competitions	5	
Social and Sports Club Flandria	Argentina	Various national competitions	5	1952, 1998, 2014, 2016, 2021
Melmac FC	Argentina	Various lower division national competitions	5	2009, 2011, 2013, 2017, 2018
Luján Sport Club	Argentina	Liga Mendocina de Fútbol	1	Title won in 2013.
Club Atlético Social y Deportivo Camioneros	Argentina	es:Liga Lujanense de Fútbol	3	

==== CONMEBOL ====
Club Team	Country	Title(s) represented	Number of stars	Notes
Universitario de Sucre	Bolivia	Bolivian Primera División	2	For leagues won in 2008 Apertura and 2014 Clausura.
Club Aurora	Bolivia	Bolivian Primera División	2	For leagues won in 1964 and 2008 Clausura.
Club Always Ready	Bolivia	Bolivian Primera División	4	For leagues won in 1951, 1957, 2020 and 2025 Apertura. Stars located inside badge.
Club Independiente Petrolero	Bolivia	Bolivian Primera División	1	One star per titles.
Club San José	Bolivia	Bolivian Primera División	4	For leagues won in 1955, 1995, 2007 Clausura, 2018 Clausura.
Club Blooming	Bolivia	Bolivian Primera División	5	For leagues won in 1984, 1998, 1999, 2005 Apertura, 2009 Clausura.
C.D. Jorge Wilstermann	Bolivia	Bolivian Primera División	5	One star per title. Currently only have 5 stars on their logo.
Oriente Petrolero	Bolivia	Bolivian Primera División and other national competitions.	16	One star per titles.
Colo-Colo	Chile	Copa Libertadores	4(1+3)	Represents trophy won in 1991 and other three stars laddered after winning 30th national championship; each star represents ten titles.
Universidad de Chile	Chile	Copa Sudamericana	1	Trophy won in 2011.
O'Higgins	Chile	Chilean Primera División	1	Title won in 2013 Apertura.
Cobresal	Chile	Chilean Primera División	1	Title won in 2014 Clausura.
Unión San Felipe	Chile	Chilean Primera División	1	One star per title.
Deportes Magallanes	Chile	Chilean Primera División	4	One star per title.
Everton de Viña del Mar	Chile	Chilean Primera División	4	One star per title.
Audax Italiano	Chile	Chilean Primera División	4	One star per title.
Club Deportivo Palestino	Chile	Chilean Primera División	2	One star per title.
Huachipato	Chile	Chilean Primera División	3	One star per title.
Coquimbo Unido	Chile	Chilean Primera División	1	One star per title.
Santiago Morning	Chile	Chilean Primera División	1	One star per title.
Santiago Wanderers	Chile	Chilean Primera División	3	One star per title.
Cobreloa	Chile	Chilean Primera División	8	One star per title.
Cúcuta Deportivo	Colombia	Colombian league	1	One star per title.
Deportes Quindío	Colombia	Colombian league	1	One star per title.
Boyacá Chicó F.C.	Colombia	Colombian league	1	One star per title.
Deportivo Pasto	Colombia	Colombian league	1	One star per title.
Deportivo Pereira	Colombia	Colombian league	1	One star per title.
Atletico Bucaramanga	Colombia	Colombian league	1	One star per title.
Deportes Tolima	Colombia	Colombian league	3	One star per title.
Atlético Junior	Colombia	Colombian league	11	One star per title.
Once Caldas	Colombia	Colombian league and Copa Libertadores	5 (1 above + 4 below)	Gold star over badge for Libertadores; four stars within badge for one league win each.
L.D.U. Quito	Ecuador	Copa Libertadores, Copa Sudamericana, Recopa Sudamericana	5	
CD El Nacional	Ecuador	Ecuadorian Serie A	20 (13 above + 7 below)	Thirteen gold stars above badge in two rows; the top row consists of three stars grouped together on both left and right with two together in the middle for eight total, the sets on the left and right represent the three consecutive Serie A titles won from 1976 to 1978 and 1982–1984, the set of two in middle represent the two consecutive Serie A titles won in 2005 (Clausura) and 2006, the second row consists of five additional gold stars for single league titles won, and below the badge is seven silver stars for seven Serie A second-place finishes.
CD Cuenca	Ecuador	Ecuadorian Serie A	1	Gold star above badge for 2004 Serie A title.
CD Olmedo	Ecuador	Ecuadorian Serie A	2 (1 above + 1 below)	White star above badge for 2000 Serie A title; white star below badge for 2004 Serie A second-place finish.
CS Patria	Ecuador	Ecuadorian Serie A, Campeonato de Guayaquil, and Segunda Categoría del Guayas	4	Four green stars below badge for 1961 Serie A second-place finish, two Campeonato de Guayaquil titles in 1958 and 1959, and the 1968 Segunda Categoría del Guayas title.
Delfín SC	Ecuador	Ecuadorian Serie A	1	Gold star above badge for 2019 Serie A title.
Aucas	Ecuador	Ecuadorian Serie A	1	Gold star above badge for 2022 Serie A title.
América de Quito	Ecuador	Copa Ganadores de Copa	1	Gold stars above badge for 1971
Independiente del Valle	Ecuador	Copa Sudamericana, Recopa Sudamericana	3	Gold stars above badge for 2019 & 2022 Copa Sudamericana and 2023 Recopa Sudamericana titles.
SD Quito	Ecuador	Ecuadorian Serie A	5	Gold stars above badge for each Serie A title.
Olimpia Asunción	Paraguay	Intercontinental Cup and Copa Libertadores	4	One golden star for 1979 Intercontinental Cup, three silver stars for the 1979, 1990 and 2002 Copa Libertadores.
Sol de América	Paraguay	Paraguayan Primera División	2	Titles won in 1986 and 1991.
Sportivo Ameliano	Paraguay	Copa Paraguay and Supercopa Paraguay	2	Titles won in 2022.
General Caballero (JLM)	Paraguay	Copa Paraguay	1	Titles won in 2025.
Cienciano	Peru	Copa Sudamericana and Recopa Sudamericana	2	Titles won in 2003 and 2004.
FBC Melgar	Peru	Peruvian Primera División	2	Peruvian championship title in 1981; second star added after their 2015 championship title.
Juan Aurich	Peru	Peruvian Primera División	1	Peruvian championship title won in 2011.
Unión Huaral	Peru	Peruvian Primera División	2	Peruvian championship titles won in 1976, 1989.
Atlético Chalaco	Peru	Peruvian Primera División	2	Peruvian championship titles won in 1930, 1947,
CD San Martín	Peru	Peruvian Primera División	3	Peruvian championship titles won in 2007, 2008 and 2010.
Sporting Cristal	Peru	Peruvian Primera División	3	Three consecutive titles won from 1994 to 1996.
Sport Boys	Peru	Peruvian Primera División	6	Stars under the badge (one per title).
Defensor Lima	Peru	Peruvian Primera División and a title	2	1973 Peruvian Primera División
Comerciantes Unidos	Peru	Copa Perú	3	The three stars represent the three times that Comerciantes reached the National Stage of the Copa Perú.
Sport Rosario	Peru	Copa Perú	1	Copa Perú championship title won in 2016.
Defensor La Bocana	Peru	Copa Perú and other titles	5	Copa Perú and other 4 titles.
Deportivo Binacional	Peru	Peruvian Primera División	3	
Caracas	Venezuela	Primera División Venezolana	12	One title per star.
Deportivo Táchira	Venezuela	Primera División Venezolana	10	One title per star.
Portuguesa FC	Venezuela	Primera División Venezolana	5	One title per star.
Zamora F.C.	Venezuela	Primera División Venezolana	4	One title per star.
Universidad Central	Venezuela	Primera División Venezolana	2	One title per star.
Estudiantes de Mérida	Venezuela	Primera División Venezolana	2	One title per star.
Monagas	Venezuela	Primera División Venezolana	1	One title per star.
Mineros de Guayana	Venezuela	Primera División Venezolana	1	One title per star.
Deportivo Lara	Venezuela	Primera División Venezolana	1	One title per star.
Minervén	Venezuela	Primera División Venezolana	1	One title per star.
Unión Atlético Maracaibo	Venezuela	Primera División Venezolana	1	One title per star.
Deportivo La Guaira F.C.	Venezuela	Primera División Venezolana	1	One title per star.
Deportivo Anzoátegui	Venezuela	Segunda División Venezolana	1	One title per star.
Trujillanos F.C.	Venezuela	Copa Venezuela	2	Titles won in 1992 and 2010.
C.A. Progreso	Uruguay	Uruguayan Primera División	1	One title per star.
C.A. Bella Vista	Uruguay	Uruguayan Primera División	1	One title per star.
Liverpool FC	Uruguay	Uruguayan Primera División	1	One title per star.
Rampla Juniors	Uruguay	Uruguayan Primera División	2	One star represent Uruguayan Primera División, one star is unknown.
Danubio F.C.	Uruguay	Uruguayan Primera División	4	One title per star.
Montevideo Wanderers F.C.	Uruguay	Uruguayan Primera División	4	One title per star.
Central Español	Uruguay	Uruguayan Primera División	3	One title per title. Other 2 titles are unknown.

==== CONMEBOL (Brazil states champions) ====
Club Team	Country	Title(s) represented	Number of stars	Notes
São Cristóvão	Brazil	Campeonato Carioca	1	Title won in 1926.
Plácido de Castro Futebol Club	Brazil	Campeonato Acreano	1	Title won in 2013.
Atlético Acreano	Brazil	Campeonato Acreano	1	
Atlético Clube Juventus	Brazil	Campeonato Acreano	1	Represent 10 titles.
São Francisco Futebol Clube (AC)	Brazil	Campeonato Acreano second division	1	
Murici Futebol Clube	Brazil	Campeonato Alagoano	1	Title won in 2010.
Associação Atlética Coruripe	Brazil	Campeonato Alagoano	3	Titles won in 2006, 2007, 2014
Oratório Recreativo Clube	Brazil	Campeonato Amapaense	1	Title won in 2012.
Ypiranga Clube	Brazil	Campeonato Amapaense	10	Titles won in 1976, 1992, 1994, 1997, 1999, 2002, 2003, 2004, 2018, and 2020.
Trem Desportivo Clube	Brazil	Campeonato Amapaense	5	Titles won in 1952, 1984, 2007, 2010, and 2011.
Santana Esporte Clube	Brazil	Campeonato Amapaense	7	Titles won in 1960, 1961, 1962, 1965, 1968, 1972, and 1985.
Santos Futebol Clube (AP)	Brazil	Campeonato Amapaense	7	Titles won in 2000, 2013, 2014, 2015, 2016, 2017, and 2019.
Independente Esporte Clube	Brazil	Campeonato Amapaense	5	Titles won in 1982, 1983, 1989, 1995, and 2001.
Princesa do Solimões Esporte Clube	Brazil	Campeonato Amazonense	1	Title won in 2013.
Peñarol Atlético Clube	Brazil	Campeonato Amazonense	3	Titles won in 2010, 2011, and 2020.
Manaus Futebol Clube	Brazil	Campeonato Amazonense	4	Titles won in 2017, 2018, 2019, and 2021.
Colo-Colo de Futebol e Regatas	Brazil	Campeonato Baiano	3	Campeonato Baiano won in 2006, Campeonato Baiano 2nd division won in 1999 and 2014.
Alagoinhas	Brazil	Campeonato Baiano	2	Title won in 2021 & 2022
Fluminense de Feira Futebol Clube	Brazil	Campeonato Baiano	1	Titles won in 1963, 1969
Associação Desportiva Bahia de Feira	Brazil	Campeonato Baiano	1	Title won in 2011
Associação Desportiva Leônico	Brazil	Campeonato Baiano	1	Title won in 1966
Galícia Esporte Clube	Brazil	Campeonato Baiano	3	Titles won in 1941, 1942, 1943
Esporte Clube Primeiro Passo Vitória da Conquista	Brazil	Campeonato Baiano 2nd division	3	Title won in 2006
Associação Desportiva Jequié	Brazil	Campeonato Baiano 2nd division	3	Titles won in 1992, 2007
Juazeiro Social Clube	Brazil	Campeonato Baiano 2nd division	3	Titles won in 1996, 2010
Sociedade Desportiva Juazeirense	Brazil	Campeonato Baiano 2nd division	3	Title won in 2011
América Football Club (CE)	Brazil	Campeonato Cearense	2	Title won in 1935, 1966.
Ceará	Brazil	Campeonato Cearense	5	Five consecutive titles from 1915 to 1919.
Caucaia Esporte Clube	Brazil	Campeonato Cearense 2nd division, 3rd division	2	Title won in 2009, 2019
Crateús Esporte Clube	Brazil	Campeonato Cearense 3nd division	2	Title won in 2004, 2010
Maracanã Esporte Clube	Brazil	Campeonato Cearense 2nd division	1	Title won in 2012
Associação Desportiva Iguatu	Brazil	Campeonato Cearense 2nd division, 3rd division	2	Title won in 2017, 2012
Itapipoca Esporte Clube	Brazil	Campeonato Cearense 2nd division, 3rd division	2	Title won in 2002, 2013
Uruburetama Futebol Clube	Brazil	Campeonato Cearense 3rd division	1	Title won in 2011
Sobradinho Esporte Clube	Brazil	Campeonato Brasiliense	3	Titles won in 1985, 1986, 2018
Associação Atlética Luziânia	Brazil	Campeonato Brasiliense	2	Titles won in 2014, 2016
Ceilândia Esporte Clube	Brazil	Campeonato Brasiliense	2	Titles won in 2010, 2012
Sociedade Atlético Ceilandense	Brazil	Campeonato Brasiliense second division	1	Title won in 2009
Bosque Formosa Esporte Clube	Brazil	Campeonato Brasiliense second division	1	Title won in 1999
Paranoá Esporte Clube	Brazil	Campeonato Brasiliense second division	3	2004, 2019 and 2021.
Capital Clube de Futebol	Brazil	Campeonato Brasiliense second division, third division	3	Second division won in 2005, 2018, Third division won in 2009
Real Noroeste Capixaba Futebol Clube	Brazil	Copa Espírito Santo	4	2011, 2013, 2014, 2019
Linhares Futebol Clube	Brazil	Campeonato Capixaba	1	2007
Esporte Clube Aracruz	Brazil	Campeonato Capixaba	1	2012
Estrela do Norte Futebol Clube	Brazil	Campeonato Capixaba	1	2014
Sociedade Desportiva Serra Futebol Clube	Brazil	Campeonato Capixaba	1	Titles won in 1999, 2003, 2004, 2005, 2008, and 2018.
Vitória (ES)	Brazil	Campeonato Capixaba	3	
Anápolis	Brazil	Campeonato Goiano	1	1965
Itumbiara Esporte Clube	Brazil	Campeonato Goiano	1	2008
CR Atlético Catalano	Brazil	Campeonato Goiano	1	1967, 2004
Goiânia Esporte Clube	Brazil	Campeonato Goiano	5	Five Titles won in 1950–1954.
Associação Esportiva Jataiense	Brazil	Campeonato Goiano second division	2	2002, 2020
Grêmio Esportivo Anápolis	Brazil	Campeonato Goiano	2	Campeonato Goiano won in 2021, other title is Campeonato Goiano second division
Jaraguá Esporte Clube	Brazil	Campeonato Goiano second division, third division	2	Campeonato Goiano second division won in 2019, third divions won in 2017
Goiatuba Esporte Clube	Brazil	Campeonato Goiano	1	1992
Trindade Atlético Clube	Brazil	Campeonato Goiano third division	1	2005
Itauçu Esporte Clube	Brazil	Campeonato Goiano third division	1	2006
Sociedade Imperatriz de Desportos	Brazil	Campeonato Maranhense	3	2005, 2015, 2019
Bacabal Esporte Clube	Brazil	Campeonato Maranhense	1	1996
Sabiá Futebol Clube	Brazil	Campeonato Maranhense second division	1	2011
Nova Mutum Esporte Clube	Brazil	Campeonato Mato-Grossense first and second division	2	First division title won in 2020 and second division in 2019.
Mixto EC	Brazil	Campeonato Mato-Grossense	2	1 star represent 10 titles.
CE Operário Várzea-Grandense	Brazil	Campeonato Mato-Grossense	12	Titles won in 1964, 1967, 1968, 1972, 1973, 1983, 1985, 1986, 1987, 1994, 1995, and 2002.
Cacerense Esporte Clube	Brazil	Campeonato Mato-Grossense, Copa FMF	2	1 star represent Campeonato Mato-Grossense, 1 star represent Copa FMF
Sociedade Esportiva Vila Aurora	Brazil	Campeonato Mato-Grossense first division, second division, third division, Copa FMF	4	Each star represent 1 title
União Esporte Clube	Brazil	Campeonato Mato-Grossense	1	Title won in 2010.
Clube Atlético Matogrossense	Brazil	Campeonato Mato-Grossense	5	Titles won in 1946, 1950, 1955, 1956, and 1957.
Sinop Futebol Clube	Brazil	Campeonato Mato-Grossense	3	Titles won in 1990, 1998, and 1999.
Luverdense Esporte Clube	Brazil	Campeonato Mato-Grossense	3	Titles won in 2009, 2012, and 2016.
Sorriso Esporte Clube	Brazil	Campeonato Mato-Grossense	2	Titles won in 1992, and 1993.
Costa Rica Esporte Clube	Brazil	Campeonato Sul-Mato-Grossense	1	2021
Clube Desportivo Sete de Setembro	Brazil	Campeonato Sul-Mato-Grossense Campeonato Sul-Mato-Grossense – Série B	2	Campeonato Sul-Mato-Grossense first division won in 2016, second division won in 2005
Esporte Clube Águia Negra	Brazil	Campeonato Sul-Mato-Grossense	4	2007, 2012, 2019, 2020
Corumbaense Futebol Clube	Brazil	Campeonato Mato-Grossense	4	1984, 2017
Sociedade Esportiva e Recreativa Chapadão	Brazil	Campeonato Mato-Grossense Campeonato Sul-Mato-Grossense – Série B	4	1995, 2013, 2009, 2014
Ipatinga	Brazil	Campeonato Mineiro	1	Title won in 2005.
EC Democrata	Brazil	Taça Minas Gerais, Campeonato Mineiro Second Level	3	Taça Minas Gerais title won in 1981, Campeonato Mineiro Second Level title won in 2005 and 2016
Esporte Clube Mamoré	Brazil	Campeonato Citadino de Patos de Minas	6	Titles won in 1956, 1969, 1971, 1973, 1974, 1989
União Recreativa dos Trabalhadores	Brazil	Taça Minas Gerais, Campeonato Mineiro de Futebol – Módulo II	3	
Uberaba Sport Club	Brazil	Taça Minas Gerais	3	Title won in 1989, 2009, 2010
AA Caldense	Brazil	Campeonato Mineiro	1	Title won in 2002.
EC Siderúrgica	Brazil	Campeonato Mineiro	2	Titles won in 1937, 1964.
Independente Atlético Clube de Tucuruí	Brazil	Campeonato Paraense	2	Campeonato Paraense 2011, Campeonato Paraense Second Division 2009
Cametá Sport Club	Brazil	Campeonato Paraense	1	Title won in 2012
São Francisco Futebol Clube (PA)	Brazil	Campeonato Paraense second division	1	1997
Bragantino Clube do Pará	Brazil	Campeonato Paraense second division	3	2002, 2011, 2017
Paragominas Futebol Clube	Brazil	Campeonato Paraense second division	1	2012
Clube Atlético Vila Rica	Brazil	Taça ACLEP	1	2008
Clube Náutico Capibaribe	Brazil	Campeonato Pernambucano	6	Six consecutive titles won from won from 1963 to 1968
Salgueiro Atlético Clube	Brazil	Campeonato Pernambucano, Campeonato Pernambucano second division, Copa Pernambuco	3	First Division won in 2020, Second Division won in 2007, Cup won in 2005.
Sports Society Ypiranga Futebol Clube	Brazil	Campeonato Pernambucano second division, Copa Pernambuco, Copa dos Clubes Profissionais do Interior	3	2004, 1994, 1994
Central Sport Club	Brazil	Campeonato Pernambucano second division	1	1999
Associação Acadêmica e Desportiva Vitória das Tabocas	Brazil	Campeonato Pernambucano second division	4	2006, 2009, 2014, 2020
Flamengo Esporte Clube de Arcoverde	Brazil	Campeonato Pernambucano second division	2	1996, 2016
Pesqueira Futebol Clube	Brazil	Campeonato Pernambucano second division	1	2017
River Atlético Clube	Brazil	Campeonato Piauiense	4	Three stars represent 30 titles, one star is unknown.
Esporte Clube Flamengo	Brazil	Campeonato Piauiense	1	One star represent 10 titles.
Parnahyba Sport Club	Brazil	Campeonato Piauiense	1	One star represent 10 titles.
4 de Julho	Brazil	Campeonato Piauiense	4	Titles won in 1992, 1993, 2011, and 2020.
Associação Atlética Corisabbá	Brazil	Campeonato Piauiense	1	1995
Associação Atlética de Altos	Brazil	Campeonato Piauiense	3	2017, 2018, 2021
Sociedade Esportiva Picos	Brazil	Campeonato Piauiense	4	1991, 1994, 1997, 1998
Sociedade Esportiva Tiradentes	Brazil	Campeonato Piauiense	5	1972, 1974, 1975, 1982, 1990
Piauí Esporte Clube	Brazil	Campeonato Piauiense	4	1966, 1967, 1968, 1969
Nova Iguaçu Futebol Clube	Brazil	Campeonato Carioca	1	one of the Rio de Janeiro state champion
Casimiro de Abreu Esporte Clube	Brazil	Campeonato Carioca third division, fourth division, one star is unknown	3	2002, 2000
Esporte Clube Rio São Paulo	Brazil	Campeonato Carioca third division	1	2019
Associação Cultural e Desportiva Potiguar	Brazil	Campeonato Potiguar	2	2004, 2013
Globo Futebol Clube	Brazil	Copa RN	1	2014
Associação Cultural Esporte Clube Baraúnas	Brazil	Campeonato Potiguar Copa RN	2	2006, 2004, 2007
Associação Sportiva Sociedade Unida	Brazil	Campeonato Potiguar Copa RN	2	Both titles won at 2009.
Alecrim Futebol Clube	Brazil	Campeonato Potiguar	7	Titles won at 1924, 1925, 1963, 1964, 1968, 1985, and 1986.
Grêmio Esportivo Bagé	Brazil	Campeonato Gaúcho	1	1925
Esporte Clube Novo Hamburgo	Brazil	Campeonato Gaúcho	1	2017
Sport Club Rio Grande	Brazil	Campeonato Gaúcho first and second division	3 (1+2)	1936, 1962, 2014
Grêmio Esportivo Brasil	Brazil	Campeonato Gaúcho	1	1919
Grêmio Atlético Farroupilha	Brazil	Campeonato Gaúcho	1	1935
Esporte Clube Pelotas	Brazil	Campeonato Gaúcho Recopa Gaúcha	3	1930, 2014, 2020
Tupy Futebol Clube	Brazil	Campeonato Gaúcho third division	1	2013
Associação Esportiva São Borja	Brazil	Campeonato Gaúcho third division	1	2018
Futebol Clube Marau	Brazil	Campeonato Gaúcho third division	1	2015
Clube Esportivo Aimoré	Brazil	Campeonato Gaúcho third division	1	2012
Clube Esportivo Bento Gonçalves	Brazil	Copa FGF	1	2004
Guajará Esporte Clube	Brazil	Campeonato Rondoniense	1	Title won in 2000.
Vilhenense Esportivo Clube	Brazil	Campeonato Rondoniense	1	Title won in 2019.
Porto Velho Esporte Clube	Brazil	Campeonato Rondoniense	2	Titles won in 2020 and 2021.
Sport Club Genus de Porto Velho	Brazil	Campeonato Rondoniense	1	Title won in 2015.
Rondoniense Social Clube	Brazil	Campeonato Rondoniense	1	Title won in 2016.
Ji-Paraná Futebol Clube	Brazil	Campeonato Rondoniense, Campeonato Rondoniense Second division	10 (9+1)	Red stars for First division titles at 1991, 1992, 1995, 1996, 1997, 1998, 1999, 2001, and 2012; Gold star for Second division title at 2011.
Vilhena Esporte Clube	Brazil	Campeonato Rondoniense	5	Titles won in 2005, 2009, 2010, 2013, and 2014.
Sociedade Esportiva União Cacoalense	Brazil	Campeonato Rondoniense	2	Titles won in 2003 and 2004.
Real Ariquemes Esporte Clube	Brazil	Campeonato Rondoniense	2	Titles won in 2017 and 2018.
São Raimundo Esporte Clube (RR)	Brazil	Campeonato Roraimense	6	Back to back wins, from 2016 to 2021.
Baré Esporte Clube	Brazil	Campeonato Roraimense	2	One star represent 10 titles
Atlético Roraima Clube	Brazil	Campeonato Roraimense	8	One of the 24 times champion victory.
Caxias Futebol Clube	Brazil	Campeonato Catarinense	3	Titles won in 1929, 1954 and 1955.
Clube Atlético Carlos Renaux	Brazil	Campeonato Catarinense	2	1950, 1953
Hercílio Luz Futebol Clube	Brazil	Campeonato Catarinense	2	1957, 1958
Clube Náutico Marcílio Dias	Brazil	Campeonato Catarinense	1	1963
Esporte Clube Internacional (SC)	Brazil	Campeonato Catarinense	1	1965
Clube Náutico Almirante Barroso	Brazil	Campeonato Catarinense second division	2	2016, 2019
Concórdia Atlético Clube	Brazil	Campeonato Catarinense second division	1	2017
Associação Ferroviária de Esportes	Brazil	Campeonato Catarinense second division	3	1955, 1966, 2015
Camboriú Futebol Clube	Brazil	Campeonato Catarinense second division, third division	2	2011, 2016
Clube Atlético Hermann Aichinger	Brazil	Campeonato Catarinense second division	3	Campeonato Catarinense second division 1993, 2001. Amateur State Championship 1992
AD São Caetano	Brazil	Campeonato Paulista first division, second division, third division	3	Each star represent 3 division's titles.
Esporte Clube Noroeste	Brazil	Copa Paulista	2	2015, 2012
Grêmio Barueri	Brazil	Campeonato Paulista	2	2005 Série A3 title and 2006 Série A2 title.
Rio Claro Futebol Clube	Brazil	Campeonato Paulista second division	1	2002
Academia Desportiva Manthiqueira	Brazil	Campeonato Paulista second division	1	2017
Esporte Clube Lemense	Brazil	Campeonato Paulista second division and third division	2	Second division title at 1978, third division title at 1980
Clube Atlético Itajaí	Brazil	Campeonato Paulista third division	1	2016
Sertãozinho Futebol Clube	Brazil	Campeonato Paulista third division	3	1971, 2004, 2016
Sport Club Atibaia	Brazil	Campeonato Paulista third division	1	2017
Batatais Futebol Clube	Brazil	Campeonato Paulista various title	3	
Clube Atlético Penapolense	Brazil	Campeonato Paulista third division, Campeonato Paulista do Interior	2	2011, 2014
Sociedade Esportiva Matonense	Brazil	Campeonato Paulista second division, third division	5	3 second division titles, 1 third division title and a star is unknown
Olímpia Futebol Clube	Brazil	Campeonato Paulista second division, third division	3	second division in 1990. third division in 2000, 2007
Palmas FR	Brazil	Campeonato Tocantinense	8	Titles won in 2000, 2001, 2003, 2004, 2007, 2018, 2019, and 2020.
Gurupi Esporte Clube	Brazil	Campeonato Tocantinense	6	Titles won in 1996, 1997, 2010, 2011, 2012, and 2016.
Tocantinópolis Esporte Clube	Brazil	Campeonato Tocantinense	4	Titles won at 1990, 1993, 2002, and 2015.
Paraíso Esporte Clube	Brazil	Campeonato Tocantinense	1	1995
Associação Desportiva Freipaulistano	Brazil	Campeonato Sergipano first division, second division	2	2019, 2016
Associação Desportiva Confiança	Brazil	Campeonato Sergipano	3	back to back won in 2000–2002
Club Sportivo Sergipe	Brazil	Campeonato Sergipano	6	back to back won in 1991–1996

==== CONMEBOL (Brazil nationwide and international) ====
Club Team	Country	Title(s) represented	Number of stars	Notes
Joinville	Brazil	Campeonato Brasileiro Série B, Campeonato Brasileiro Série C	2	For each title won.
Americano	Brazil	Campeonato Brasileiro Série B, Campeonato da Cidade de Campos	10 (1 above + 9 below)	Golden star for Serie B title won in 1987 (although unofficial), 9 Red stars for 9 consecutive Campeonato da Cidade de Campos titles.
Vasco da Gama	Brazil	Various Brazilian and South American	8	For South American Club Championship 1948; Copa Libertadores 1998; Copa Mercosur 2000; 1974, 1989, 1997 and 2000 Brazilian Championships; unbeaten Campeão de Terra e Mar season in 1945 The star is now located at the collar.
Palmeiras	Brazil	Campeonato Paulista, Brazilian Championship, Copa Rio	9 (1 above + 8 inside)	Eight titles won under the name "Palestra Itália", between 1920 and 1940; others say it commemorates the eighth month (August) of 1914, when the club was founded; previously wore four silver stars, one for each Brazilian championship conquered (1972, 1973, 1993, 1994); stars are placed inside the badge, rather than the usual placement above; a red star above the badge was added in 2017 for their 1951 Copa Rio win.
Internacional (Porto Alegre)	Brazil	FIFA Club World Cup, Copa Libertadores, Brazilian Championship, Copa do Brasil	6 (1 above + 5 below)	Silver star for 2006 World title, five gold stars for others, with the Libertadores star larger than the other four (three Championships, one Copa).
Goiás	Brazil	Brazilian Série B and Goiás State Championship	2	Two silver stars, for the 1999 and 2012 Série B championships.
América do Natal	Brazil	Copa Nordeste, Campeonato Potiguar	5	One silver star for 1998 Nordeste; four yellow stars for four consecutive Potiguar from 1979 to 1982.
Fortaleza	Brazil	Campeonato Cearense and Copa Norte-Nordeste	6	Four blue stars for four consecutive Cearense Championships from 2007 to 2010; two yellow stars for wins of North/Northeast Cup in 1946 and 1970.
Vila Nova	Brazil	Campeonato Brasileiro Série C, Campeonato Goiano	5	One yellow star for 1996 Brasileiro title; four red stars for four consecutive Goiano titles from 1977 to 1980.
São Paulo	Brazil	Intercontinental Cup, FIFA Club World Cup	5	Three red stars represent two Intercontinental Cups (1992 and 1993) and one FIFA Club World Championship (2005); two gold stars commemorate Adhemar da Silva's triple jump world records at the 1952 Olympics and the 1955 Pan American Games.
Grêmio	Brazil	Intercontinental Cup, Libertadores Cup, Brazilian Championship, Copa do Brasil	3	The gold star on the badge was added in 1970 to honour Everaldo of the 1970 World Cup team, the first Grêmio player to be world champion. It also represents the 1983 Intercontinental title. The silver star represents Continental titles won (three Libertadores and two Recopa); the bronze star represents Brazilian titles (two Championships, one Serie B and five Copas).
Criciuma EC	Brazil	Copa do Brasil; Série B; Série C	3 (Note: Criciúma EC has a total of four national titles, more than any other in Santa Catarina state; however, the Campeonato Brasileiro Série B of 1986 is not recognized by Confederação Brasileira de Futebol, leaving them with just three stars.)	Copa won in 1991, Série B won in 2002 and Série C won in 2006.
Fluminense	Brazil	Brazilian Championships	3	Titles won in 1970, 1984 and 2010.
União Barbarense	Brazil	Campeonato Brasileiro Série C, 2 others	3	Série C title won in 2004.
Santos FC	Brazil	Intercontinental Cup	2	Titles won in 1962 and 1963.
EC Bahia	Brazil	Taça Brasil and Brazilian Championship	2	Taça won in 1959, Championship won 1988.
Atlético Paranaense	Brazil	Brazilian Championship and Série B	2	Gold star for 2001 title, silver star for 1995 Série B title.
Sport Club do Recife	Brazil	Brazilian Championship, Série B and Brazilian Cup	3	Gold star for Championship of 1987, silver star for 1990 Série B and another gold star for 2008 Brazilian Cup.
EC Juventude	Brazil	Copa do Brasil and Brazilian Série B	2	Gold star for the 1999 Copa, silver star for 1994 Série B.
Paraná Clube	Brazil	Brazilian Série B	2	For official Série B of 1992 and Yellow Module of Copa João Havelange in 2000.
Paysandu SC	Brazil	Serie B	2	Titles won in 1991 and 2001.
Brasiliense	Brazil	Campeonato Brasileiro Série B and Série C	2	Bronze star for C title won in 2002, silver star for B title won in 2004.
América Mineiro	Brazil	Campeonato Brasileiro Série B, Campeonato Mineiro	2	Serie B title won in 1997, and Ten Mineiro titles from 1916 to 1925.
Flamengo	Brazil	Intercontinental Cup	1	Title won in 1981
Atlético Mineiro	Brazil	Brazilian Championship	1	Represents title won in 1971.
Chapecoense	Brazil	Copa Sudamerica	1	Represents title awarded in 2016, another star incorporated into the badge to commemorate the victims of LaMia Flight 2933; previously wore four stars representing 1977, 1996, 2007, and 2011 Campeonato Catarinense titles.
Coritiba	Brazil	Brazilian Championship	1	Represents title won in 1985.
Guarani FC	Brazil	Brazilian Championship	2	Gold star for Série A won in 1978, silver star for 1981 Série B.
Centro Sportivo Alagoano	Brazil	Campeonato Brasileiro Série C	1	Title won in 2017.
Santo André	Brazil	Copa do Brasil	1	Title won in 2004.
Paulista	Brazil	Copa do Brasil	1	Title won in 2005.
Gama	Brazil	Campeonato Brasileiro Série B	1	Title won in 1998.
Londrina	Brazil	Campeonato Brasileiro Série B	1	Title won in 1980.
Avaí	Brazil	Campeonato Brasileiro Série C	1	Title won in 1998.
Atlético Goianiense	Brazil	Campeonato Brasileiro Série C Campeonato Brasileiro Série B	3	Serie C titles won in 1990 and 2008. Serie B title won in 2016.
Remo	Brazil	Campeonato Brasileiro Série C Campeonato Paraense	6 (5+1)	Silver star for Serie C title won in 1985, 5 Golden stars for five-times triple champions of Para state championships (1924–26, 1952–54, 1973–75, 1977–79, 1989–91)
Rio Branco	Brazil	Copa Norte	1	Title won in 1997.
Sampaio Corrêa	Brazil	Campeonato Brasileiro Série B, Campeonato Brasileiro Série C, Campeonato Brasileiro Série D, Campeonato Maranhense	5 (2+3)	3 stars represent Serie B, Serie C, and Serie D titles.
Campo Grande	Brazil	Campeonato Brasileiro Série B	1	Title won in 1982.
Internacional (Limeira)	Brazil	Campeonato Brasileiro Série B, Campeonato Paulista	3	Serie B title won in 1986, 1988. Campeonato Paulista title won in 1986.
Juventus (SP)	Brazil	Campeonato Brasileiro Série B, Campeonato Paulista	2	Silver star for Serie B title won in 1984. The Gold star for previously unofficial 1934 Campeonato Paulista organised by FPF, later recognised at 2021.
Tuna Luso	Brazil	Serie B, Serie C	5	Serie B title won in 1985, Serie C title won in 1992.
Uberlândia EC	Brazil	Serie B, Serie D	2	Serie B titles won in 1984, Serie D title won in 2026.
Operário Ferroviário	Brazil	Serie C, Serie D	2	Serie D title won in 2017, Serie C title won in 2018.
Mirassol	Brazil	Serie C, Serie D	2	Serie D title won in 2020, Serie C title won in 2022.
Boa Esporte Clube	Brazil	Serie C	1	Serie C title won in 2016.
Macaé Esporte Futebol Clube	Brazil	Serie C	1	Serie C title won in 2014.
ABC Futebol Clube	Brazil	Serie C, Campeonato Potiguar	5 (1+4)	Serie C 2010. 4 stars represent champion in all four categories in 1954: professional, amateur, junior, and youth leagues.
Oeste Futebol Clube	Brazil	Serie C	1	Serie C title won in 2012.
XV de Novembro (Piracicaba)	Brazil	Serie C	1	Serie C title won in 1995.
Ferroviário Atlético Clube (CE)	Brazil	Serie D	2	Serie D title won in 2018 and 2023
São Raimundo Esporte Clube (PA)	Brazil	Serie D	1	Serie D title won in 2009.
Guarany Sporting Club	Brazil	Serie D	1	Serie D title won in 2010.
Tupi Football Club	Brazil	Serie D	1	Serie D title won in 2011.
Tombense	Brazil	Serie D	1	Serie D title won in 2014.
Botafogo Futebol Clube (SP)	Brazil	Serie D	1	Serie D title won in 2015.
Volta Redonda	Brazil	Serie D	1	Serie D title won in 2016.
Aparecidense	Brazil	Serie D	1	Serie D title won in 2021.
Retrô FC	Brazil	Serie D	1	Serie D title won in 2024.
Barra Futebol Clube (SC)	Brazil	Serie D	1	Serie C title won in 2025.
Brusque	Brazil	Serie D, Campeonato Catarinense	3	Serie D title won in 2019, and also Campeonato Catarinense title won in 1992 and 2022.
São Raimundo Esporte Clube (AM)	Brazil	Copa Norte	3	Titles won in 1999, 2000, 2001.
Cuiabá Esporte Clube	Brazil	Copa Verde	2	Titles won in 2015 and 2019.
Itabaiana	Brazil	Copa do Nordeste, Campeonato Sergipano	6 (1+5)	1971 Copa do Nordeste, Campeonato Sergipano back to back titles won in 1978–1982
América Futebol Clube (Rio Grande do Norte)	Brazil	Copa do Nordeste, Campeonato Potiguar	6 (1+5)	1998, other 5 stars are unknown
Campinense Clube	Brazil	Copa do Nordeste, Campeonato Potiguar	7 (1+6)	6 Small gold stars for 6 consecutive 1960–1965 state championship triumph, and One bigger star for 2013 Copa do Nordeste title won.

==== UEFA ====
Club Team	Country	Title(s) represented	Number of stars	Notes
KF Tirana	Albania	Albanian Superliga	2	Each star represents ten titles.
Dinamo Tirana	Albania	Albanian Superliga	1	Represents ten titles.
Partizani Tirana	Albania	Albanian Superliga	1	Represents ten titles.
Rapid Wien	Austria	Austrian Bundesliga	3	Each star represents ten titles.
Austria Wien	Austria	Austrian Bundesliga	2	Each star represents ten titles.
FC Wacker Innsbruck	Austria	Austrian Bundesliga	1	Represents ten titles (five titles as FC Wacker Innsbruck, two titles as FC Swarovski Tirol, three titles as FC Tirol Innsbruck).
Red Bull Salzburg	Austria	Austrian Bundesliga	1	Represents ten titles.
Kapaz PFC	Azerbaijan	Azerbaijan Premier League	3	One golden star for each league championship.
Neftchi Baku	Azerbaijan	Azerbaijan Premier League	1	Represents five league championships.
Qarabağ	Azerbaijan	Azerbaijan Premier League	2	Represents five league championships.
BATE Borisov	Belarus	Belarusian Premier League	3	Each star represents five titles.
Dinamo Minsk	Belarus	Belarusian Premier League	1	Represents five titles.
Anderlecht	Belgium	Belgian Pro League	3	Each golden star represents ten titles.
Club Brugge	Belgium	Belgian Pro League	2	Represents ten titles.
Standard Liège	Belgium	Belgian Pro League	1	Represents ten titles.
Union SG	Belgium	Belgian Pro League	1	Represents ten titles.
CSKA Sofia	Bulgaria	Bulgarian A Group	3	Added three stars after their 30th league title in 2005.
PFC Ludogorets Razgrad	Bulgaria	Bulgarian A Group	1	Represents ten titles; added after their 10th league title in 2021.
Dinamo Zagreb	Croatia	1. HNL	3	Each star represents ten titles; 30th title won in 2019.
Sparta Prague	Czech Republic	Gambrinus Liga	3	Each star represents ten titles.
Slavia Prague	Czech Republic	Gambrinus Liga	2	Each star represents ten titles; 20th title won in 2020.
Dukla Prague	Czech Republic	Gambrinus Liga	1	Represents ten titles.
APOEL	Cyprus	Cypriot First Division	2	Each star represents ten titles.
Omonia	Cyprus	Cypriot First Division	2	Each star represents ten titles.
Anorthosis Famagusta	Cyprus	Cypriot First Division	1	Represents ten titles.
KB	Denmark	Danish Premier League	3	Each star represents five titles.
Copenhagen	Denmark	Danish Premier League	3	Each star represents five titles.
Brøndby	Denmark	Danish Premier League	2	Each star represents five titles.
AB	Denmark	Danish Premier League	1	Each star represents five titles.
B93	Denmark	Danish Premier League	1	Each star represents five titles.
B1903	Denmark	Danish Premier League	1	Each star represents five titles.
BK Frem	Denmark	Danish Premier League	1	Each star represents five titles.
AGF	Denmark	Danish Premier League	1	Each star represents five titles.
Esbjerg fB	Denmark	Danish Premier League	1	Each star represents five titles.
Vejle BK	Denmark	Danish Premier League	1	Each star represents five titles.
Liverpool F.C.	England	UEFA Champions League	6	Titles won in 1977, 1978, 1981, 1984, 2005 and 2019.
Wanderers F.C.	England	FA Cup	5	Titles won in 1872, 1873, 1876, 1877 and 1878.
Manchester United	England	UEFA Champions League	3	Titles won in 1968, 1999 and 2008.
Huddersfield Town	England	English First Division	3	First team to win English First Division three times in a row, between 1924 and 1926.
Ipswich Town	England	English First Division, FA Cup, UEFA Cup	3	Trophies won respectively in 1962, 1978 and 1981. Stars added in 2007.
Forest Green Rovers F.C.	England	English Football League	3(1+2)	The first star represent Forest Green Rovers F.C. won the National League (English football) promotion playoff to reach EFL League Two in 2017. The 2nd and 3rd stars remain faded unless the team reach EFL League One for 2nd star and EFL Championship for 3rd star.
Chelsea F.C.	England	UEFA Champions League	2	Titles won in 2012 and 2021.
Nottingham Forest	England	UEFA Champions League	2	Two silver stars worn above the club crest to commemorate back to back European Cup victories, in 1979 and 1980.
AFC Fylde	England	FA Vase, FA Trophy	2	FA Vase won at 2007–08, FA Trophy won at 2018–19.
West Auckland Town F.C.	England	Sir Thomas Lipton Trophy	2	Titles won in 1909 and 1911.
Bury F.C.	England	FA Cup	2	Title won in 1900 and 1903. The Men's adult team have been expelled by Football League but the Bury F.C. Boys, Girls & Women team are still active.
Manchester City	England	UEFA Champions League	1	Title won in 2023.
Aston Villa	England	UEFA Champions League	1	Title won in 1982. Star incorporated into the crest.
Bradford City A.F.C.	England	FA Cup	1	Title won in 1911.
Old Carthusians F.C.	England	FA Cup	1	Title won in 1881.
Royal Engineers A.F.C.	England	FA Cup	1	Title won in 1875. Portrayed as the cup itself.
Flora Tallinn	Estonia	Meistriliiga	3	Each star represents five titles.
Levadia Tallinn	Estonia	Meistriliiga	2	Each star represents five titles.
HB	Faroe Islands	Faroe Islands Premier League	2	Each star represents ten titles. Has 24 titles.
KÍ	Faroe Islands	Faroe Islands Premier League	2	Each star represents ten titles. Has 22 titles.
B36	Faroe Islands	Faroe Islands Premier League	1	Each star represents ten titles. Has 11 titles.
Helsingin Jalkapalloklubi	Finland	Veikkausliiga	5	Each star represents ten titles; three stars for the men's championships and two stars for the women's championships.
Marseille	France	UEFA Champions League	1	Title won in 1993.
Paris Saint-Germain	France	UEFA Champions League	2	Title won in 2025, 2026.
Saint-Étienne	France	French league	1	Represents ten titles; last won a title in 1981.
Pamandzi SC	France	Qualified for Coupe de France from Mayotte region	2	
Bayern Munich	Germany	German Bundesliga	5	Represents thirty Bundesliga titles; the 1932 German championship win is not counted. Fourth star added after 2008, the 20th title. Fifth star added after their 2020/21 season title.
Borussia Mönchengladbach	Germany	German Bundesliga	2	Represents five titles.
Borussia Dortmund	Germany	German Bundesliga	2	Represents five titles. Second star added in 2012, previously wore only one.
Werder Bremen	Germany	German Bundesliga	1	Represents three titles.
Hamburger SV	Germany	German Bundesliga	1	Represents three titles.
TuS Dassendorf	Germany	Hamburg Cup	2	
VfB Stuttgart	Germany	German Bundesliga	1	
Olympiacos	Greece	Super League Greece, UEFA Europa Conference League	5	Four stars represents ten titles. A fifth, larger star was added in 2024 to represent the UEFA Europa Conference League trophy.
AEL Larissa	Greece	Super League Greece, Greek Cup	3	Each star represents one domestic major title. Gold star for 1987/88 Greek League, and 2 Silver stars for the 1985 and 2007 Greek Cup titles.
APO Keratsini	Greece	Piraeus FCA Cup	7	Each star represents one local cup.
Megas Alexandros Orfani	Greece	Greek Amateur Cup	1	The one star represents the 1987-88 Amateur's cup.
Ferencváros	Hungary	Hungarian Championship	3	Each star represents ten titles.
MTK	Hungary	Hungarian Championship	2	Each star represents ten titles.
Újpest	Hungary	Hungarian Championship	2	Each star represents ten titles.
Budapest Honvéd	Hungary	Hungarian Championship	1	Each star represents ten titles.
Valur	Iceland	Icelandic league	4	Each star represents five titles.
Fram Reykjavík	Iceland	Icelandic league	3	Each star represents five titles.
Knattspyrnufélag Reykjavíkur	Iceland	Icelandic league	5	Each star represents five titles.
Knattspyrnufélagið Víkingur	Iceland	Icelandic league	1	Each star represents five titles.
Íþróttabandalag Akraness	Iceland	Icelandic league	3	Each star represents five titles.
Fimleikafélag Hafnarfjarðar	Iceland	Icelandic league	1	Each star represents five titles.
Bohemians	Ireland	League of Ireland	1	Represents ten titles.
Dundalk	Ireland	League of Ireland	1	Represents ten titles.
Shamrock Rovers	Ireland	League of Ireland	2	Represents ten titles; tenth title was won in 1964, but star was not added until fifteenth title had already been won.
Shelbourne	Ireland	League of Ireland	1	Represents ten titles; tenth title was won in 2002, but star was not added until eleventh title had already been won
Beitar Jerusalem	Israel	Israeli championships	1	Each star represents five titles.
Hapoel Tel Aviv	Israel	Israeli championships	2	Each star represents five titles; five titles were won before during the Mandatory Palestine(Eretz Yisrael) period.
Hapoel Be'er Sheva F.C.	Israel	Israeli championships	1	Each star represents five titles.
Maccabi Haifa	Israel	Israeli championships	3	Each star represents five titles.
Maccabi Netanya	Israel	Israeli championships	1	Each star represents five titles.
Hapoel Petah Tikva F.C.	Israel	Israeli championships	1	Each star represents five titles.
Maccabi Tel Aviv	Israel	Israeli championships	5	Each star represents five titles; five titles were won before during the Mandatory Palestine(Eretz Yisrael) period.
Ironi Kiryat Shmona	Israel	Israeli championships	1	Represents the North Star.
Juventus	Italy	Italian Serie A	3	Each represents ten Italian Football Championship and Serie A titles. The first, added in 1958 by a Lega Calcio verdict, represents the first case in sports history which a golden star is used in the kits as a sporting and honorific symbol. Second star added in 1982. Added a third star following their supposed 30th league title in 2011–12 but removed them all following a dispute with the Italian Football Federation (FIGC), who stripped Juventus of their 2004–05 title and did not assign to them the 2005–06 title due to the 2006 Italian football scandal, leaving the official total at 28. Juventus have since won their 30th title in the 2013–14 season and thus earned the right to wear the third star, the club removed all stars until another club earns the right to wear two stars "to emphasise the difference". However, the three stars have been reinstated from 2015 after reaching sponsorship deal with Adidas.
Internazionale	Italy	Italian Serie A	2	Each star represents ten titles. The first was added in 1966 and the second was added in 2024.
Milan	Italy	Italian Serie A	1	Represents ten titles. Added in 1979.
Astana	Kazakhstan	Kazakhstan Premier League	2	One star represents 3 titles.
Kairat	Kazakhstan	Kazakhstan Premier League	1	One star represents 3 titles.
Jenis	Kazakhstan	Kazakhstan Premier League	1	One star represents 3 titles.
FC Aktobe	Kazakhstan	Kazakhstan Premier League	1	One star represents 3 titles.
Ventspils	Latvia	Latvian Higher League	1	Each star represents five titles.
FK Žalgiris	Lithuania	A Lyga	1	Represents ten titles. Added in 2024.
FK Sirijus Klaipėda	Lithuania	A Lyga	1	Represents title won in the first championship after restoration of statehood in Lithuania. Added in 2023.
Jeunesse Esch	Luxembourg	National Division	2	Each represents ten titles.
F91 Dudelange	Luxembourg	National Division	1	Represents ten titles.
Sliema Wanderers	Malta	Maltese Premier League	2	Each star represents ten titles.
Floriana	Malta	Maltese Premier League	2	Each star represents ten titles.
Valletta	Malta	Maltese Premier League	2	Each star represents ten titles.
Hibernians	Malta	Maltese Premier League	1	Represents ten titles. Added in 2009
Hamrun	Malta	Maltese Premier League	1	Represents ten titles. Added in 2024.
Victoria Hotspurs F.C.	Malta	Gozo Football League First Division	1	Each star represents ten titles.
Nadur Youngsters F.C.	Malta	Gozo Football League First Division	1	Each star represents ten titles.
Sannat Lions F.C.	Malta	Gozo Football League First Division	1	Each star represents ten titles.
Sheriff Tiraspol	Moldova	Moldovan League	2	Represents ten titles.
Ajax	Netherlands	Eredivisie and Dutch Championship (pre-1956)	3	Each star represents ten titles.
PSV Eindhoven	Netherlands	Eredivisie and Dutch Championship (pre-1956)	2	Each star represents ten titles.
Feyenoord	Netherlands	Eredivisie and Dutch Championship (pre-1956)	1	Represents ten titles.
FC Twente (women)	Netherlands	Eredivisie (women) and BeNe League (2012–2015)	1	Represents ten women team titles (incl highest ranked Dutch club in the BeNe League)
HVV Den Haag	Netherlands	Dutch Championship (pre-1956)	1	Represents ten titles. Star incorporated into the crest.
VV Katwijk	Netherlands	National amateur football title	4	1993, 1994, 2000, 2013
VV Noordwijk	Netherlands	National amateur football title	2	1973, 1980
SV Huizen	Netherlands	National amateur football title	2	1974, 2013
De Treffers	Netherlands	National amateur football title	2	1991, 1998
DOS Kampen	Netherlands	National amateur football title	2	1981, 1999
VV Geldrop	Netherlands	National amateur football title	3	1984, 1987, 1990
SVV Scheveningen	Netherlands	National amateur football title	1	1996
ASWH	Netherlands	National amateur football title	1	2005
SV Argon	Netherlands	National amateur football title	1	2007
WKE	Netherlands	National amateur football title	1	2009
FC Lisse	Netherlands	National amateur football title	1	2008
Excelsior Maassluis	Netherlands	National amateur football title	1	2016
HSC '21	Netherlands	National amateur football title	1	1999
Linfield	Northern Ireland	Northern Irish league	5	Each star represents ten titles.
Rosenborg	Norway	Norwegian league	2	One golden star for every ten league titles. Since 2024, Rosenborg have opted to have the stars in black.
Fredrikstad	Norway	Norwegian cup	1	One silver star for every ten cup titles.
Odd	Norway	Norwegian cup	1	One silver star for every ten cup titles.
Górnik Zabrze	Poland	Polish League	1	Gold star represents ten or more titles.
Ruch Chorzów	Poland	Polish League	1	Gold star represents ten or more titles.
Wisła Kraków	Poland	Polish League	1	Gold star represents ten or more titles.
Legia Warsaw	Poland	Polish League	1	Gold star represents ten or more titles.
Lech Poznań	Poland	Polish League	1	Gold star represents ten or more titles.
ŁKS Łódź	Poland	Polish League	1	White star represents one to four titles.
Piast Gliwice	Poland	Polish League	1	White star represents one to four titles; first title won in 2019.
Polonia Bytom	Poland	Polish League	1	White star represents one to four titles.
Śląsk Wrocław	Poland	Polish League	1	White star represents one to four titles.
Warta Poznań	Poland	Polish League	1	White star represents one to four titles.
Widzew Łódź	Poland	Polish League	1	White star represents one to four titles.
Stal Mielec	Poland	Polish League	1	White star represents one to four titles.
Zagłębie Lubin	Poland	Polish League	1	White star represents one to four titles.
Garbarnia Kraków	Poland	Polish League	1	White star represents one to four titles.
Szombierki Bytom	Poland	Polish League	1	White star represents one to four titles.
Benfica	Portugal	Portuguese League	3	Each star represents ten titles; announced in February 2008 for the following season, by which time a 31st title had been won.
Steaua București	Romania	Romanian League	2	Each star represents ten titles. Ministry of National Defence (Romania) have reclaim the trademark of Steaua Bucharest after the football department have been revived.
FCSB	Romania	Romanian League	2	Each star represents ten titles. The club change its name after Ministry of National Defence (Romania) have reclaim the trademark of Steaua Bucharest after the football department have been revived.
Dinamo București	Romania	Romanian League	1	Represents ten titles.
Spartak Moscow	Russia	Russian Premier League, Soviet Top League	4	Each star represents five titles. Wore one star from 2003 to 2012 to commemorate their Russian Premier League wins, added another three in 2013 as Russian clubs were then allowed to include their pre-1992 Soviet titles in the tally.
Dynamo Moscow	Russia	Soviet Top League	2	Each star represents five titles.
Zenit Saint Petersburg	Russia	Russian Premier League, Soviet Top League	2	Each star represents five titles.
Rangers	Scotland	Scottish Premier League	5	Each star represents ten titles. 55 in total. The stars were moved to back of the jersey.
Aberdeen	Scotland	European Cup Winners' Cup and European Super Cup	2	Both trophies won in 1983. Aberdeen remain the only football club in Europe to incorporate a star for the European Super Cup.
Celtic	Scotland	European Cup	1	Star for European Cup win in 1967.
Dumbarton FC	Scotland	Scottish Premier League	2	First and second edition of Scottish champion. The stars were added since 2011.
Shetland football team	Scotland	Football at the Island Games	1	Winner of Football at the 2005 Island Games – Men's tournament
Slovan Bratislava	Slovakia	Fortuna Liga	3	Awarded in 2009, each star represents five titles.
MŠK Žilina	Slovakia	Fortuna Liga	1	Awarded in 2010, the star represents five titles.
Maribor	Slovenia	Slovenian PrvaLiga	1	Star represents ten titles.
Red Star Belgrade	Serbia	Serbian SuperLiga, First League of Serbia and Montenegro, Yugoslav First League	3	Each star represents ten titles.
Partizan	Serbia	Serbian SuperLiga, First League of Serbia and Montenegro, Yugoslav First League	2	Each star represents ten titles.
AIK	Sweden	Svenska Mästerskapet, Allsvenskan, Mästerskapsserien	1	Each star represents ten Swedish championships.
Djurgårdens IF	Sweden	Svenska Mästerskapet, Allsvenskan	1	Each star represents ten Swedish championships.
IFK Göteborg	Sweden	Svenska Mästerskapet, Allsvenskan, Allsvenskan play-offs, Mästerskapsserien	1	Each star represents ten Swedish championships.
IFK Norrköping	Sweden	Allsvenskan, Allsvenskan play-offs	1	Each star represents ten Swedish championships.
Malmö FF	Sweden	Allsvenskan	2	Each star represents ten Swedish championships.
Örgryte IS	Sweden	Svenska Mästerskapet, Allsvenskan play-offs	1	Each star represents ten Swedish championships.
Grasshoppers	Switzerland	Swiss Super League	2	Each represents ten titles.
Basel	Switzerland	Swiss Super League	2	Each star represents ten titles.
FC La Chaux-de-Fonds	Switzerland	Swiss Super League	3	1953–54, 1954–55, 1963–64
Servette	Switzerland	Swiss Super League	1	Represents ten titles.
Young Boys	Switzerland	Swiss Super League	1	Represents ten titles.
Zürich	Switzerland	Swiss Super League	1	Represents ten titles.
Galatasaray	Turkey	Turkish Super League	5	Each star represents five titles.
Fenerbahçe	Turkey	Turkish Super League	3 (Note: Officially recognized number of stars is 3. The club badge from the 2022-23 season contains 5 stars to represent 28 championships as an act of protest against the TFF's lack of recognition of the club's pre-1959 titles. However, the Federation has not allowed Fenerbahçe to display the badge in league matches.)	Each star represents five titles.
Beşiktaş	Turkey	Turkish Super League	3	Each star represents five titles.
Trabzonspor	Turkey	Turkish Super League	1	Represents five titles.
Dynamo Kyiv	Ukraine	Ukrainian Premier League, Soviet Top League	3	Represents twenty Ukrainian titles and ten USSR titles. Second star was added on 6 September 2007 for USSR champion titles.
Connah's Quay Nomads F.C.	Wales	Cymru Premier	2	2019–20, 2020–21

==== UEFA (Former German national champions which did not win three Bundesliga title) ====
Club Team	Country	Title(s) represented	Number of stars	Notes
TSV 1860 Munich	Germany	German Bundesliga	1	
VfR Mannheim	Germany	German Championship	1	
Freiburger FC	Germany	German Championship	1	
Eintracht Braunschweig	Germany	German Championship	1	
Rot-Weiss Essen	Germany	German Championship	1	
FC Viktoria 1889 Berlin	Germany	German Championship	1	
Karlsruher FV	Germany	German Championship	1	
1. FC Kaiserslautern	Germany	German Championship German Bundesliga	1	Currently play in 2. Bundesliga will not display star.
Dresdner SC	Germany	German Championship German Bundesliga	1	
F.C. Hansa Rostock	Germany	NOFV-Oberliga	1	Currently play in 3. Liga will not display star.
Berliner FC Dynamo	Germany	DDR-Oberliga	1	
Dynamo Dresden	Germany	DDR-Oberliga	1	
FC Erzgebirge Aue	Germany	DDR-Oberliga	1	Currently play in 3. Liga will not display star.
1. FC Magdeburg	Germany	DDR-Oberliga	1	
FC Carl Zeiss Jena	Germany	DDR-Oberliga	1	
Chemnitzer FC	Germany	DDR-Oberliga	1	
Turbine Halle	Germany	DDR-Oberliga	1	
FSV Zwickau	Germany	DDR-Oberliga	1	
FC Rot-Weiß Erfurt	Germany	DDR-Oberliga	1	

==== Northern Cyprus ====
Club Team	Country	Title(s) represented	Number of stars	Notes
Küçük Kaymaklı Türk S.K.	Northern Cyprus	KTFF Süper Lig	1	
Baf Ülkü Yurdu S.K.	Northern Cyprus	KTFF Süper Lig	1	
Mağusa Türk Gücü S.K.	Northern Cyprus	KTFF Süper Lig	2	
Gönyeli S.K.	Northern Cyprus	KTFF Süper Lig	2	
Çetinkaya Türk S.K.	Northern Cyprus	KTFF Süper Lig	3	

==== Beach Soccer (UEFA) ====
Club Team	Country	Title(s) represented	Number of stars	Notes
BSC Kristall	Russia	Russian Beach Soccer Championships	1	One star represent 5 titles.
BSC Lokomotiv Moscow	Russia	Russian Beach Soccer Championships	1	One star represent 5 titles.

==== AFC Futsal ====
Club Team	Country	Title(s) represented	Number of stars	Notes
FS Seoul	Korea Republic	FK-League	2	2018–19, 2019–20
Yes Gumi FS	Korea Republic	FK-League	1	2015–16
Jeonju MAG FC	Korea Republic	FK-League FK Cup	6	FK-League 2009–10, 2012–13, 2013–14, 2014–15. FK Cup 2013, 2014.
Nagoya Oceans	Japan	AFC Futsal Club Championship	4	2011, 2014, 2016, 2019
Chonburi Bluewave Futsal Club	Thailand	AFC Futsal Club Championship	2	2013, 2017
Port Futsal Club	Thailand	Futsal Thai League	3	2007, 2018, 2019
Mes Sungun FSC	Iran	AFC Futsal Club Championship	1	

==== CONMEBOL Futsal ====
Club Team	Country	Title(s) represented	Number of stars	Notes
Pato Futsal	Brazil	Liga Futsal	2	2018, 2019
Associação Desportiva Classista Intelli	Brazil	Liga Futsal	2	2018, 2019
Associação Carlos Barbosa de Futsal	Brazil	Liga Futsal	3	2001, 2004, 2006, 2009, 2015
Foz Cataratas Futsal	Brazil	Campeonato Paranaense de Futsal	2	2018, 2019
Associação de Futsal de Umuarama	Brazil	Campeonato Paranaense de Futsal	2	2007, 2008
Associação Atlética Escola Superior Madre Celeste	Brazil		3	
Delta te Quiero	Venezuela	Liga Nacional de Fútbol Sala (Venezuela)	2	
Deportivo Panta	Peru	División de Honor de Fútbol Sala (Perú)	6	
Società Sportiva Bocca	Ecuador	Liga Nacional de Futsal de Ecuador	7	
Club Deportivo Real Bucaramanga	Colombia	Liga Colombiana de Fútbol Sala	3	
Alianza Platanera	Colombia	Liga Colombiana de Fútbol Sala	3	
Leones de Nariño	Colombia	Liga Colombiana de Fútbol Sala	1	
Club Deportivo Lyon	Colombia	Liga Colombiana de Fútbol Sala	1	

==== UEFA Futsal ====
Club Team	Country	Title(s) represented	Number of stars	Notes
AFC Kairat	Kazakhstan	UEFA Futsal Champions League	2	2012–13, 2014–15
CFS Bisontes Castellón	Spain	UEFA Futsal Champions League	3	2000–01, 2001–02, 2002–03

==== CONCACAF (Indoor soccer) ====
Club Team	Country	Title(s) represented	Number of stars	Notes
Baltimore Blast	United States	Major Arena Soccer League	10	The re-establish team retained the 1 star.
San Diego Sockers	United States	Major Arena Soccer League	15	The re-establish team retained the 10 stars.
San Diego Sockers 2	United States	Major Arena Soccer League 2	1	Title won in 2018–19.
Chicago Mustangs	United States	Major Arena Soccer League Major Arena Soccer League 2	2	Major Arena Soccer League title won in 2013–14. Major Arena Soccer League 2 title won in 2017–18
Dallas Sidekicks	United States	Major Arena Soccer League	4	1986–87 MISL, 1993 CISL, 1998 PSA, 2001 WISL. The re-establish team retained the 4 stars.
Cleveland Crunch	United States	National Professional Soccer League (1984–2001) Major Arena Soccer League 2	4	1993–94, 1995–96, 1998–99. The re-establish team retained the 3 stars.
Monterrey Flash	Mexico	Major Arena Soccer League	1	Title won in 2014–15.

==== CONMEBOL (Women) ====
Club Team	Country	Title(s) represented	Number of stars	Notes
Atlético Huila	Colombia	Colombian Women's Football League	1	2018
São José Esporte Clube (women)	Brazil	Copa Libertadores Femenina, International Women's Club Championship	4	Copa Libertadores Femenina in 2011, 2013, 2014, International Women's Club Championship in 2014
Minas Brasília Tênis Clube	Brazil	Campeonato Brasileiro de Futebol Feminino – Série A2	1	2018
Sociedade Esportiva Kindermann	Brazil	Copa do Brasil de Futebol Feminino	1	
Foz Cataratas Futebol Clube	Brazil	Copa do Brasil de Futebol Feminino	1	2011
Esporte Clube Iranduba da Amazônia	Brazil	Campeonato Amazonense Women's League	8	
Associação Atlética Escola Superior Madre Celeste	Brazil	Campeonato Paraense de Futebol Feminino	3	
Santiago Morning (women)	Chile	Chilean women's football championship	3	

==== CONCACAF (Women) ====
Club Team	Country	Title(s) represented	Number of stars	Notes
Vancouver Rise FC	Canada	Northern Super League	1	2025
C.F. Monterrey (women)	Mexico	Liga MX Femenil	2	Apertura 2019, Apertura 2021
Tigres UANL (women)	Mexico	Liga MX Femenil	5	Clausura 2018, Clausura 2019, Guardianes 2020, Guardianes 2021, Apertura 2022
North Carolina Courage	United States	National Women's Soccer League	2	2018, 2019
Portland Thorns FC	United States	National Women's Soccer League	3	2013, 2017, 2022
FC Kansas City	United States	National Women's Soccer League	2	2014, 2015
Washington Spirit	United States	National Women's Soccer League	1	2021
Santa Clarita Blue Heat	United States	United Women's Soccer	2	2016, 2021
Midwest United FC	United States	United Women's Soccer	3	2016 u16 national champion, 2017, 2019 U.S. Soccer Development Academy Girls U-18/19 Championship

==== CONCACAF (Women college soccer) ====
Club Team	Country	Title(s) represented	Number of stars	Notes
UC San Diego Tritons	United States	NCAA Division I Women's Soccer Championship NCAA Division II Women's Soccer Championship	7	
Penn State Nittany Lions women's soccer	United States	NCAA Division I Women's Soccer Championship	1	2015
UCLA Bruins women's soccer	United States	NCAA Division I Women's Soccer Championship	1	2013
Santa Clara Broncos women's soccer	United States	NCAA Division I Women's Soccer Championship	2	
USC Trojans women's soccer	United States	NCAA Division I Women's Soccer Championship	2	
Florida State Seminoles women's soccer	United States	NCAA Division I Women's Soccer Championship	3	2014, 2018, 2021
Portland Pilots women's soccer	United States	NCAA Division I Women's Soccer Championship	2	2002, 2005. Stars are at sleeve.
Metro State Roadrunners	United States	NCAA Division II Women's Soccer Championship	2	
Lynchburg Hornets	United States	NCAA Division III Women's Soccer Championship	1	2014
Keiser University	United States	NAIA Women's Soccer Championship	2	
Westmont College	United States	NAIA Women's Soccer Championship	5	
Lindsey Wilson College	United States	NAIA Women's Soccer Championship	4	
Spring Arbor University	United States	NAIA Women's Soccer Championship	2	
University of Tennessee Southern	United States	NAIA Women's Soccer Championship	3	
William Carey University	United States	NAIA Women's Soccer Championship	1	
University of Mobile	United States	NAIA Women's Soccer Championship	1	

==== AFC (Women) ====
Club Team	Country	Title(s) represented	Number of stars	Notes
Fujieda Junshin	Japan	All Japan High School Women's Soccer Tournament	5	2006, 2015, 2017, 2019, 2020
INAC Kobe Leonessa	Japan	Nadeshiko League	3	Three successive league titles.
Nippon TV Tokyo Verdy Beleza	Japan	Nadeshiko League	8	
Incheon Hyundai Steel Red Angels WFC	South Korea	WK League	8	
Suwon UDC WFC	South Korea	WK League	1	2010
Taichung Blue Whale	Taiwan	Taiwan Mulan Football League	5	

==== UEFA (Women) ====
Club Team	Country	Title(s) represented	Number of stars	Notes
Olympique Lyonnais Féminin	France	Division 1 Féminine	1	One star represent 10 titles
1. FFC Turbine Potsdam	Germany	Frauen-Bundesliga	1	Star written with number 6
Eintracht Frankfurt (women)	Germany	Frauen-Bundesliga	2	2 stars represent at least 5 Bundesliga titles.
VfL Wolfsburg (women)	Germany	Frauen-Bundesliga	2	2 stars represent at least 5 Bundesliga titles.
Fortuna Hjørring	Denmark	Elitedivisionen	2	One star represent 5 titles
Helsingin Jalkapalloklubi	Finland	Kansallinen Liiga	2	One star represent 10 titles
Birkirkara F.C. (women)	Malta	Maltese Women's League	1	One star represent 10 titles. Added in 2022
Hibernians F.C. (women)	Malta	Maltese Women's League	1	One star represent 10 titles. Added in 2014
FC Rosengård	Sweden	Damallsvenskan	1	One star represent 10 titles
FC Zürich Frauen	Switzerland	Swiss Women's Super League	2	One star represent 10 titles
SFK 2000	Bosnia and Herzegovina	Bosnia and Herzegovina Women's Premier League	1	One star represent 10 titles
ŽFK Spartak Subotica	Serbia	Serbian Women's Super League	1	One star represent 10 titles
Zvezda-2005 Perm	Russia	Russian Women's Football Championship	1	One star represent 5 titles
KKPK Medyk Konin	Poland	Ekstraliga (women's football)	4	2014, 2015, 2016, 2017
Górnik Łęczna (women)	Poland	Ekstraliga (women's football)	3	2017–18, 2018–19, 2019–20
Wexford Youths W.F.C.	Ireland	National competitions	5	Represent 2014–15,2015–16 continental Tyres WNL League, 2015 SSE Airtricity First Division, 2015 WFAI Cup, 2015–16 WNL Shield,

== List in other sports ==
=== National teams ===
==== Intercontinental (field hockey) ====
National Team	Title(s) represented	First worn	Number of stars	Notes
Belgium	Men's FIH Hockey World Cup	2018	1	Titles won in 2018 Men's Hockey World Cup

Note: Unlike in football which women's teams will adopt men's star on their jersey, Belgium women's national field hockey team does not wear the men's stars on their jersey.

==== Intercontinental (badminton) ====
National Team	Title(s) represented	First worn	Number of stars	Notes
China	Badminton at the Summer Olympics, BWF World Championships, Sudirman Cup, Uber Cup (women only), Thomas Cup (men only)	2010	5 (maximum 4 bright stars)	All badminton players that represent China will wear the badminton uniform that feature 5 stars except at Olympic Games. Players who won one of the world championships will earn a bright star. The fifth star represent Badminton World Cup was defunct.

==== Intercontinental (men's handball) ====
National Team	Title(s) represented	First worn	Number of stars	Notes
France	World Men's Handball Championship		6	
Denmark	World Men's Handball Championship	2019	4	
Sweden	World Men's Handball Championship		4	
Croatia	World Men's Handball Championship		1	
Spain	World Men's Handball Championship		2	
Russia	World Men's Handball Championship		2	

==== Intercontinental (women's handball) ====
National Team	Title(s) represented	First worn	Number of stars	Notes
France	IHF World Women's Handball Championship		2	
Hungary	IHF World Women's Handball Championship		1	
Romania	IHF World Women's Handball Championship		3	One star is for world champion, 2 stars is for outdoor/field world champion.
Netherlands	IHF World Women's Handball Championship		1	
Denmark	IHF World Women's Handball Championship	1997	1	

==== Intercontinental (cricket) ====
National Team	Title(s) represented	First worn	Number of stars	Notes
Sri Lanka	ICC Men's T20 World Cup	2021	1	ICC Men's T20 World Cup in 2014. Unlike most teams, star is placed below the crest.
India	Cricket World Cup ICC Men's T20 World Cup	2011	3/2	Cricket World Cup in 1983, 2011 and the ICC Men's T20 World Cup in 2007. Later changed to two stars for the 2023 Cricket World Cup to solely represent India's two ODI World Cup championships.
West Indies	Cricket World Cup		2	Cricket World Cup in 1975, 1979. Two stars also used to represent the two ICC Men's T20 World Cup championships in 2012, 2016 when participating in the ICC Men's T20 World Cup.
England	Cricket World Cup		2	Two stars, representing championships in 2010 and 2022, are worn during ICC Men's T20 World Cup competitions. England has also won a Cricket World Cup in 2019.
Pakistan	Cricket World Cup		1	Cricket World Cup in 1992.

=== Sport clubs adopt same logo as football ===
While the club logo with star usually represent football major trophy, the same logo applied to other sport department as well.

Club Team	Country	Title(s) represented	Numbers written at the jersey	Notes
Al Ittihad Alexandria Club	Egypt	6 times Egypt Cup winner	6	In football, basketball.
Étoile Sportive du Sahel (Football)	Tunisia	10 times Tunisian Ligue Professionnelle 1 champion in football	1	In football, basketball
Estudiantes de La Plata	Argentina	One star represent major trophy in football competition won by Estudiantes de La Plata.	1	In football, field hockey, basketball, golf, judo.
Boca Juniors	Argentina	The logo of Boca Juniors represent major trophy in football competition.	68	
Clube de Regatas do Flamengo	Brazil	1981 Intercontinental Cup winner	1	In football, basketball, esports.
Club de Regatas Vasco da Gama	Brazil	Stars represent major trophy in football competition.	8	In football, basketball
São Paulo FC	Brazil	Football and athletics titles	5	In football, basketball, esport.
Borussia Dortmund	Germany	5 times Bundesliga champion in football	2	In football, esports handball(women).
Bayern Munich	Germany	20 times Bundesliga champion in football	4	In football, handball, esports, table tennis, chess.
Buriram United	Thailand	Thai's football domestic treble in 2011	1	In football, esport.
Persib Bandung	Indonesia	Liga 1 (Indonesia)	1	In football, esport
Johor Darul Ta'zim	Malaysia, Argentina (polo only)	Malaysian Super League	3	In football, polo, ice hockey, esport.
Club Atlético Colón	Argentina	Argentinian football cup	1	In football, basketball.
Feyenoord	Netherlands	10 times Dutch football champion	1	In football, esports.
PSV Eindhoven	Netherlands	20 times Dutch football champion	2	In football, esports.
AFC Ajax	Netherlands	30 times Dutch football champion	3	In football, esports.

=== Recreation Club ===
Club Team	Country	Title(s) represented	Number of stars	Notes
Esporte Clube Sírio	Brazil	FIBA Intercontinental Cup and other	2	1979 FIBA Intercontinental Cup winner and tennis children world champion won by William Kyriakos in 1982.

=== Table tennis ===
Club Team	Country	Title(s) represented	Number of stars	Notes
AS Pontoise-Cergy TT	France	European Champions League (table tennis)	2	2014, 2016

=== Rugby union ===
Club Team	Country	Title(s) represented	Number of stars	Notes
Saracens F.C.	England	European Rugby Champions Cup	3	2015-16, 2016-17, 2018-19
Bath Rugby	England	European Rugby Champions Cup	1	1997-98
Exeter Chiefs	England	European Rugby Champions Cup	1	2019-20
Northampton Saints	England	European Rugby Champions Cup	1	1999-00
Leinster Rugby	Ireland	European Rugby Champions Cup	4	2008-09, 2010-11, 2011-12, 2017-18
Munster Rugby	Ireland	European Rugby Champions Cup	2	2005-06, 2007-08
Ulster Rugby	Ireland	European Rugby Champions Cup	1	1998-99
Stade Toulousain	France	European Rugby Champions Cup	6	1995-96, 2002-03, 2004-05, 2009-10, 2020-21, 2023-24
RC Toulonnais	France	European Rugby Champions Cup	3	2012-13, 2013-14, 2014-15
Bordeaux Bègles	France	European Rugby Champions Cup	2	2024-25, 2025-26
Stade Rochelais	France	European Rugby Champions Cup	2	2021-22, 2022-23
CA Brive	France	European Rugby Champions Cup	1	1996-97
Sale Sharks	England	English Premiership	1	2006
Benetton Rugby	Italy	Top10 (rugby union)	1	1 star represent 10 titles
Petrarca Rugby	Italy	Top10 (rugby union)	1	1 star represent 10 titles
CS Dinamo București (rugby union)	Romania	SuperLiga (rugby union)	1	1 star 10 titles

=== Basketball ===
==== NCAA ====
Club Team	Country	Title(s) represented	Numbers of stars	Notes
Indiana Hoosiers men's basketball	United States	NCAA Division I men's basketball tournament	5	1940, 1953, 1976, 1981, 1987. The stars are located on the trunks.

==== Rest of the world ====
Club Team	Country	Title(s) represented	Number of stars	Notes
AEL Limassol B.C.	Cyprus	Cyprus Basketball Division A, FIBA Europe Conference South	2	1 star represent 10 domestic titles. 2nd added in 2022 to commemorate winning the regional trophy in 2002–03.
Aris B.C.	Greece	Greek Basket League	2	1 star represent 10 titles 2nd star represent domestic and European major titles
Panathinaikos B.C.	Greece	EuroLeague	7	1995–96, 1999–00, 2001–02, 2006–07, 2008–09, 2010–11, 2023–24
Fenerbahçe Basketball	Turkey	EuroLeague	2	2016–17, 2024–25
Fenerbahçe Women's Basketball	Turkey	EuroLeague Women	3	2022–23, 2023–24, 2025–26
BC Dinamo Tbilisi	Georgia	EuroLeague	1	1961–62
KK Bosna Royal	Bosnia and Herzegovina	EuroLeague	1	1978–79
KK Partizan	Serbia	EuroLeague Basketball League of Serbia	3	Euro League 1992, Serbian league 20 times
KK Crvena zvezda	Serbia	Basketball League of Serbia	2	Serbian league 20 times
Olimpia Milano	Italy	Lega Basket Serie A	3	Italian league 30 times
Virtus Bologna	Italy	Lega Basket Serie A	1	Italian league 10 times
Pallacanestro Varese	Italy	Lega Basket Serie A	1	Italian league 10 times
ASC 1846 Göttingen	Germany	Basketball Bundesliga	1	Representing 1 national title
FC Bayern Munich (basketball)	Germany	Basketball Bundesliga	2	Representing 5 national titles
Bayer Giants Leverkusen	Germany	Basketball Bundesliga	3	Representing 10 national titles
Brose Bamberg	Germany	Basketball Bundesliga	3	
Alba Berlin	Germany	Basketball Bundesliga	3	Representing 10 national titles
Giessen 46ers	Germany	Basketball Bundesliga	2	Representing 5 national titles
EWE Baskets	Germany	Basketball Bundesliga	1	Representing 1 national title
Ratiopharm Ulm	Germany	Basketball Bundesliga	1	Representing 1 national title
KB Prishtina	Kosovo	Kosovo Basketball Superleague	2	
Heroes Den Bosch	Netherlands	Dutch Basketball League	1	1 star represent 10 titles
KK Włocławek	Poland	Polish Basketball League	3	
Stal Ostrów Wielkopolski	Poland	Polish Basketball League	1	
Basket Zielona Góra	Poland	Polish Basketball League	5	
Club Atlético Peñarol (Mar del Plata)	Argentina	Liga Nacional de Básquet	5	1993–94, 2009–10, 2010–11, 2011–12, 2013–14
Club Atlético Aguada	Uruguay	Liga Uruguaya de Básquetbol	10	One star for each titles.
Club Malvín	Uruguay	Liga Uruguaya de Básquetbol	5	One star for each titles.
Hebraica Macabi	Uruguay	Liga Uruguaya de Básquetbol	5	One star for each titles.
Club Trouville	Uruguay	Liga Uruguaya de Básquetbol	2	One star for each titles.
Étoile Sportive de Radès	Tunisia	Championnat National A Tunisian Basketball Cup	2	One star represent 10 titles.
Stade Nabeulien	Tunisia	Tunisian Basketball Cup	1	One star represent 10 titles.
Xinjiang Flying Tigers	China	Chinese Basketball Association	1	Total of titles are written in number.
Sichuan Blue Whales	China	Chinese Basketball Association	1	Total of titles are written in number.
Beijing Ducks	China	Chinese Basketball Association	1	Total of titles are written in number.
Liaoning Flying Leopards	China	Chinese Basketball Association	1	Total of titles are written in number.
Guangdong Southern Tigers	China	Chinese Basketball Association	1	Total of titles are written in number.
Taipei Fubon Braves	Taiwan	Super Basketball League	1	Commemorative of Super Basketball League victory in 2019.

=== Gaelic football ===
Club Team	Country	Title(s) represented	Number of stars	Notes
Meath county football team	Ireland	All-Ireland Senior Football Championship	7	1949, 1954, 1967, 1987, 1988, 1996, 1999. Stars are located at the back of the kit.

=== Handball ===
==== Handball (men) ====
Club Team	Country	Title(s) represented	Number of stars	Notes
Montpellier Handball	France	EHF Champions League	2	2002–03, 2017–18
RK Metaloplastika	Serbia	EHF Champions League	2	1984–85, 1985–86
RK Vardar	North Macedonia	EHF Champions League	2	2016–17, 2018–19
Vive Kielce	Poland	EHF Champions League	2	2016
RK Celje	Slovenia	EHF Champions League	3	2003–04, other 2 stars represent 10 domestic titles
Redbergslids IK	Sweden	List of Swedish men's handball champions	2	2 stars represent 10 domestic titles
CD Bidasoa	Spain	EHF Champions League	1	1994–95
SC Magdeburg	Germany	EHF Champions League	3	1978, 1981, 2002
THW Kiel	Germany	EHF Champions League	4	2007, 2010, 2012, 2020
SG Flensburg-Handewitt	Germany	Handball-Bundesliga	1	1 star represent 3 titles
VfL Gummersbach	Germany	Handball-Bundesliga	3	3 star represent 10 titles
Frisch Auf Göppingen	Germany	Handball-Bundesliga	2	2 star represent 5 titles
HC Meshkov Brest	Belarus	Handball-Bundesliga	2	2 star represent 10 titles
KIF Kolding	Denmark	Danish Men's Handball League	2	1 star represent 5 titles
Aalborg Håndbold	Denmark	Danish Men's Handball League	1	1 star represent 5 titles
Kadetten Schaffhausen	Switzerland	Swiss Handball League	3	unknown
Pallamano Conversano	Italy	Serie A (men's handball)	5	2003, 2004, 2006, 2010, 2011
Espérance Sportive de Tunis (handball)	Tunisia	Tunisian Handball League	3	One star represent 10 titles.
Club Africain (handball)	Tunisia	Tunisian Handball League	1	One star represent 10 titles.

==== Handball (Women) ====
Club Team	Country	Title(s) represented	Number of stars	Notes
Győri Audi ETO KC	Hungary	Nemzeti Bajnokság I (women's handball)	1	1 star represent 10 titles
Ferencvárosi TC (women's handball)	Hungary	Nemzeti Bajnokság I (women's handball)	1	1 star represent 10 titles
PDO Handball Team Salerno	Italy	Serie A1 (women's handball)	7	2010, 2011, 2013, 2014, 2017, 2018, 2019
ŽRK Budućnost Podgorica	Montenegro	Women's EHF Champions League	2	2012, 2015
Hypo Niederösterreich	Austria	Women's EHF Champions League	8	1989, 1990, 1992, 1993, 1994, 1995, 1998, 2000
RK Krim	Slovenia	Women's EHF Champions League	2	2001, 2003
CSM București (women's handball)	Romania	Women's EHF Champions League	1	2016
Zagłębie Lubin (women's handball)	Poland	Polish Women's Superliga (women's handball)	1	
LC Brühl Handball	Switzerland	SPAR Premium League	3	1 star represent 10 titles
SG BBM Bietigheim	Germany	Handball-Bundesliga (women)	2	2017, 2019

=== Ice hockey ===
Club Team	Country	Title(s) represented	Number of stars	Notes
KH Zagłębie Sosnowiec	Poland	Ekstraklasa (ice hockey)	5	1980, 1981, 1982, 1983, 1985.
EHC Red Bull München	Germany	Deutsche Eishockey Liga	4	2016, 2017, 2018, 2020
Eisbären Berlin	Germany	Deutsche Eishockey Liga	8	2005, 2006, 2008, 2009, 2011, 2012, 2013, 2021
ERC Ingolstadt	Germany	Deutsche Eishockey Liga	1	2014
Krefeld Pinguine	Germany	Deutsche Eishockey Liga	1	2003
Lausitzer Füchse	Germany	DDR-Oberliga (ice hockey)	4	1 star represent 5 titles.
Ferencvárosi TC (ice hockey)	Hungary	OB I Bajnokság	2	1 star represent 10 titles.
Tune Talk Frostbiters	Malaysia		1	

=== Field hockey ===
==== Field hockey (men) ====
Club Team	Country	Title(s) represented	Number of stars	Notes
Amsterdamsche Hockey & Bandy Club	Netherlands	Men's Hoofdklasse Hockey Women's Hoofdklasse Hockey	2	1 star represent 10 titles.

==== Field hockey (women) ====
Club Team	Country	Title(s) represented	Number of stars	Notes
Amsterdamsche Hockey & Bandy Club	Netherlands	Women's Hoofdklasse Hockey	2	1 star represent 10 titles.
HC 's-Hertogenbosch	Netherlands	Women's Hoofdklasse Hockey	2	1 star represent 10 titles.

=== Baseball ===
Club Team	Country	Title(s) represented	Number of stars	Notes
Parma Baseball Club	Italy	Italian Baseball League	1	One star represent 10 titles.
Nettuno Baseball Club	Italy	Italian Baseball League	1	One star represent 10 titles.
Rimini Baseball Club	Italy	Italian Baseball League	1	One star represent 10 titles.
Fortitudo Baseball Bologna	Italy	Italian Baseball League Coppa Italia (baseball)	2 (1+1)	One star represent 10 titles
Neptunus	Netherlands	Honkbal Hoofdklasse	1	One star represent 10 titles

=== Volleyball ===
==== Men's volleyball ====
Club Team	Country	Title(s) represented	Numbers written at the jersey	Notes
Paris Volley	France	CEV Champions League	1	2011
Tours VB	France	CEV Champions League	1	2005
CS Dinamo București (men's volleyball)	Romania	Divizia A1 (men's volleyball)	1	One star represent 10 titles.
Skra Bełchatów	Poland	Various national titles	1	
Resovia (volleyball)	Poland	Various national titles	1	
Jastrzębski Węgiel	Poland	PlusLiga	2	2004, 2021
Iraklis Thessaloniki	Greece	A1 Ethniki Volleyball, Greek Volleyball Cup	1	One star represents 10 titles.
Funvic Taubaté	Brazil	Brazilian Men's Volleyball Superliga, Brazilian Men's Volleyball Cup	4	2 stars for Brazilian Men's Volleyball Superliga, 2 stars for Brazilian Men's Volleyball Cup.
UPCN San Juan Vóley	Argentina	Liga Argentina de Voleibol – Serie A1	8	2010–11, 2011–12, 2012–13, 2013–14, 2014–15, 2015–16, 2017–18, 2020–21
Club Social Monteros	Argentina	Liga Argentina de Voleibol – Serie A1	1	2004–05
Shanghai Men's Volleyball Club	China	Chinese Volleyball Super League	2	2018–19, 2019–20. Titles won before 2017 cannot adopt star on kit.

==== Women's volleyball ====
Club Team	Country	Title(s) represented	Numbers written at the jersey	Notes
Schweriner SC	Germany	CEV Women's Champions League Women's CEV Cup	2	CEV Women's Champions League in 1978, Women's CEV Cup in 1975
Fenerbahçe Women's Volleyball	Turkey	CEV Women's Champions League	1	2012
VakıfBank S.K.	Turkey	CEV Women's Champions League	6	2011, 2013, 2017, 2018, 2022, 2023
VC Uralochka-NTMK	Russia	Russian Women's Volleyball Super League	5	1 star for 5 titles.
RC Cannes	France	CEV Women's Champions League LNV Ligue A Féminine	4(2+2)	2 stars for national league titles, 2 stars for European champions
KPS Chemik Police	Poland	TAURON Liga	9	1994, 1995, 2014, 2015, 2016, 2017, 2018, 2020, 2021
Tianjin Bohai Bank women's volleyball team	China	Chinese Volleyball Super League	2	Chinese Volleyball Super League winner in 2017–18, 2019–20. Titles won before 2017 cannot adopt star on kit.

=== Cricket ===
Club Team	Country	Title(s) represented	Number of stars	Notes
Chennai Super Kings	India	Indian Premier League	5	2010, 2011, 2018, 2021, 2023
Kolkata Knight Riders	India	Indian Premier League	3	2012, 2014, 2024
Royal Challengers Bengaluru	India	Indian Premier League	2	2025, 2026
Gujarat Titans	India	Indian Premier League	1	2022
Sunrisers Hyderabad	India	Indian Premier League	1	2016
Rajasthan Royals	India	Indian Premier League	1	2008
Islamabad United	Pakistan	Pakistan Super League	3	2016, 2018, 2024
Lahore Qalandars	Pakistan	Pakistan Super League	3	2022, 2023, 2025
Peshawar Zalmi	Pakistan	Pakistan Super League	2	2017, 2026
Karachi Kings	Pakistan	Pakistan Super League	1	2020
Quetta Gladiators	Pakistan	Pakistan Super League	1	2019
Multan Sultans	Pakistan	Pakistan Super League	1	2021

=== Kabaddi ===
Club Team	Country	Title(s) represented	Number of stars	Notes
Bengal Warriorz	India	Pro Kabaddi League	1	2019
Bengaluru Bulls	India	Pro Kabaddi League	1	2018-19
Dabang Delhi K.C.	India	Pro Kabaddi League	2	2021-22, 2025
Jaipur Pink Panthers	India	Pro Kabaddi League	2	2014, 2022
Patna Pirates	India	Pro Kabaddi League	3	2016 I, 2016 II, 2017
Puneri Paltan	India	Pro Kabaddi League	1	2023-24
U Mumba	India	Pro Kabaddi League	1	2015
Haryana Steelers	India	Pro Kabaddi League	1	2024

=== Esports ===
==== Overall ====
Club Team	Country	Title(s) represented	Number of stars	Notes
FaZe Clan	United States	Call of Duty League; Counter-Strike Major Championships; Halo World Championship; Six Invitational (2x)	5	Titles won in 2021 (as Atlanta FaZe), 2022, 2023, 2025 and 2026 respectively. Represent all world championships won by the organization. Displayed regardless of title, with FaZe Vegas a possible exception.

==== Esports World Cup ====
Club Team	Country	Title(s) represented	Number of stars	Notes
Team Falcons	Saudi Arabia	Esports World Cup Club Championship	2	Titles won in 2024 and 2025; initially a single silver star indicating team founder Mossad "MsDossary" Al Dossary's FIFA eWorld Cup title in 2018 (which he won as part of Rogue) before becoming a gold star after their EWC title. Displayed regardless of game title, with Riyadh Falcons being an exception.

==== League of Legends ====
Club Team	Country	Title(s) represented	Number of stars	Notes
T1	South Korea	League of Legends World Championship	6	2013, 2015, 2016, 2023, 2024, 2025
Invictus Gaming	China	League of Legends World Championship	1	2018
FunPlus Phoenix	China	League of Legends World Championship	1	2019
Dplus KIA	South Korea	League of Legends World Championship	1	2020
Edward Gaming	China	League of Legends World Championship	1	2021
KIWOOM DRX	South Korea	League of Legends World Championship	1	2022
Team Liquid	United States	League Championship Series	4	One star represents all titles.
Team SoloMid	United States	League Championship Series	7	One star represents all titles.
100 Thieves	United States	League Championship Series	1	One star represents the title.
KaBuM! e-Sports	Brazil	Campeonato Brasileiro de League of Legends	4	2014, 2018, 2018, 2020

==== Counter-Strike ====
Club Team	Country	Title(s) represented	Number of stars	Notes
Astralis	Denmark	Counter-Strike Major Championships	4	Titles won in 2017, 2018, Katowice 2019, and Berlin 2019.
Team Vitality	France	Counter-Strike Major Championships	3	Titles won in 2023, Austin 2025 and Budapest 2025.
Cloud9	United States	Counter-Strike Major Championships	1	Title won in 2018. Only displayed during Major Championships.

==== Dota 2 ====
Club Team	Country	Title(s) represented	Number of stars	Notes
OG	Europe	The International	2	2018 and 2019; the "stars" are two illustrations of the Aegis of Champions.
Team Liquid	Netherlands	The International	1	2017

==== Rocket League ====
Club Team	Country	Title(s) represented	Number of stars	Notes
Team Vitality	France	Rocket League Championship Series	2	2019, 2023
NRG Esports	USA	Rocket League Championship Series	2	2019, 2025

== List of former and temporary use ==
=== National teams ===
==== Men ====
Intercontinental (football)

National Team	Title(s) represented	First worn	Number of stars	Notes
Japan	Asian Cup	2011 AFC Asian Cup award ceremony	4	One time only. Titles won in 1992, 2000, 2004, and 2011.
Singapore	AFF Championship	2012 AFF Championship award ceremony	4	Two times only. Titles won in 1998, 2004, 2007, and 2012.
Mexico	Olympic Games	Atletica advertisement featuring Carlos Salcido in 2021.	1	Title won in 2012.
Denmark	UEFA European Championship	UEFA Euro 2004	1	12 years anniversary of Denmark UEFA Euro 1992 champion.
Peru	Copa América	2019 Copa América	2	Titles won in 1939 and 1975.
Ghana	Africa Cup of Nations	2008	4	The star were removed in 2019. Titles won in 1963, 1965, 1978 and 1982.
Morocco	Africa Cup of Nations	2019	2	The star were removed for unknown reason.Title won in 1976 and 2025

=== Football club ===
==== AFC ====
Club Team	Country	Title(s) represented	Number of stars	Notes
DPMM FC	Brunei	Singapore Premier League	2	2015, 2019. The team only adopt stars during Singaporean League.
Melbourne Victory	Australia	A-League	1	
Sydney FC	Australia	A-League	1	
Central Coast Mariners FC	Australia	A-League	2	
Mohun Bagan	India	National Football League and I-League	4	The star were removed and replaced with the word "champion". ATK and Mohun Bagan won the 2020 Indian titles.
Phnom Penh Crown FC	Cambodia	Cambodian Premier League	6	
Nagaworld FC	Cambodia	Cambodian Premier League	2	The stars were removed after the club changed its name and logo.
F.C. Chanthabouly	Laos	Lao Premier League	3	The stars were removed after the club changed its name and logo.
Sagawa Shiga FC	Japan	Japan Football League	3	The stars were removed after the club ceased to be professional club.
Gangneung City FC	Korea Republic	Korea National League	2	The stars have been removed after joining K-League.
Gyeongju Korea Hydro & Nuclear Power FC	Korea Republic	Korea National League	2	The stars have been removed after joining K-League.
Suwon FC	Korea Republic	Korea National League	1	The star have been removed after joining K-League.
FC Pocheon	Korea Republic	K3 League	6	Stars removed in 2021.
Yangju Citizen FC	Korea Republic	K3 League	1	
Hwaseong FC	Korea Republic	K3 League	2	
Seoul Nowon United FC	Korea Republic	K3 League	1	
National Taiwan University of Sport	Taiwan	Domestic university championship	1	

==== CAF ====
Club Team	Country	Title(s) represented	Number of stars	Notes
Gor Mahia F.C.	Kenya	African Cup Winners' Cup	1	Title won in 1987. The star was removed in 2012.

==== CONCACAF ====
Club Team	Country	Title(s) represented	Number of stars	Notes
Vancouver Whitecaps	Canada	USL First Division, North American Soccer League	3	2 stars are worn for their 2 championships in the USL First Division (2006, 2008) and one for the Vancouver Whitecaps (NASL) win in the Soccer Bowl of 1979. The stars were removed when they joined Major League Soccer for the 2011 season.
Montreal Impact	Canada	USL First Division, A-League, American Professional Soccer League	3	Each star represents a league championship, won in 1994, 2004 and 2009; two stars were worn after their second league title, and a third star was added after their third title; the stars were removed when they joined Major League Soccer for the 2012 season; the four stars on the 2012 Impact logo do not represent championships, but instead the four founding communities of Montreal represented on the city's coat of arms.
Orlando City SC	United States	USL Championship	1	The star was removed after joining MLS.
Grand Canyon University	United States	NCAA Division II	1	Removed star after moving to Division I
Northern Kentucky Norse	United States	NCAA Division II	1	Represents club's 2010 NCAA Division II national championship. The team retained its star even after moving to Division I in 2012 but the star was removed later after the team changed its logo.
UCLA Bruins men's soccer	United States	NCAA Division I	4	
Atlético Morelia	Mexico	Liga MX	1	The star was removed after the team changed its logo.
San Francisco F.C.	Panama	Liga Panameña de Fútbol	9	
C.D. Guadalajara	Mexico	Mexican First Division	12	One star per title.

==== CONMEBOL ====
Club Team	Country	Title(s) represented	Number of stars	Notes
Club Universitario de Deportes	Peru	Peruvian Primera División	26	90th anniversary special kit.
Sport Club Corinthians Paulista	Brazil	FIFA Club World Cup Campeonato Brasileiro Série A	5	Larger star for the 2000 FIFA Club World Championship, above the other four stars for four Campeonato Brasileiro titles; the stars were removed for the 2011 season onwards.
Santa Cruz Futebol Clube	Brazil	Campeonato Pernambucano	8 (3+5)	Club badge has five yellow stars for the five consecutive championships (1969–1973) and three stars for the three "super-championships" (black for 1957, white for 1976, red for 1983)
Fluminense	Brazil	Campeonato Carioca	1	115th anniversary of title won in 1906. The star was located at the collar. The club used to have 4 stars on their kit which represent Brazilian Serie A champion.
CS Emelec	Ecuador	Ecuadorian Serie A	11	Wore stars under badge for each Serie A title on shirt starting in 1997 until 2015; starting in 2016 stars no longer worn below badge.
Barcelona SC	Ecuador	Ecuadorian Serie A	15	Wore black and later red stars under badge for each Serie A title on shirt starting in 1982 until 2015; starting in 2016 stars no longer worn below badge; wore two black stars above badge in 2007 for two Copa Libertadores runners-up performances in 1991 and 1998.
S.D. Aucas	Ecuador	Campeonato Amateur del Futbol de Pichincha and Campeonato Professional Interandino	8 (6+2)	From 1998 to 2010 wore eight red or black stars above badge: six for provincial amateur titles from 1945 to 1951, and two inter-provincial professional titles in 1959 and 1962.
América de Cali	Colombia	Colombian league	13	One star per title.
Deportivo Cali	Colombia	Colombian league	9	One star per title.
Independiente Santa Fe	Colombia	Colombian league Copa Sudamericana	9 (8+1)	One star per title.
Club Nacional de Football	Uruguay	Intercontinental Cup (football)	3	115th anniversary of the club. Only wore during 2013.

==== UEFA ====
Club Team	Country	Title(s) represented	Number of stars	Notes
Jonava	Lithuania	LFF I Lyga	4	One star per title. Only wore during 2022 season.

=== Ice hockey ===
Club Team	Country	Title(s) represented	Number of stars	Notes
GKS Tychy (ice hockey)	Poland	Ekstraklasa (ice hockey)	4	2005, 2015, 2018 and 2019.

=== F1 ===
Club Team	Country	Title(s) represented	Number of stars	Notes
Mercedes-Benz in Formula One	GBR	Formula One World Constructors' Champions	7	As Mercedes-Benz logo at face mask during 2020.

=== Rugby Union ===
Club Team	Country	Title(s) represented	Number of stars	Notes
Leicester Tigers	ENG	European Rugby Champions Cup	2	

=== Esports ===
==== League of Legends ====
Club Team	Country	Title(s) represented	Number of stars	Notes
Gen.G	South Korea	League of Legends World Championship	2	2014, 2017. Title won when the League of Legends division is handled by Samsung Galaxy which LCK slot was acquired by KSV eSports (now known as Gen.G) in late 2017.

==== Rocket League ====
Club Team	Country	Title(s) represented	Number of stars	Notes
Cloud9	United States	Rocket League Championship Series	1	Title won in 2018. Rocket League department was dissolved in 2020. Other departments of Cloud9 did not adopt the star.
Team BDS	Switzerland	Rocket League Championship Series	2	Titles won in 2022 and 2024. Only present as in-game decal.

== Stars not signifying particular titles ==
Portsmouth F.C. has featured a star (of various designs) in its badge since 1913. The star does not represent trophies or titles won, instead, the Portsmouth badge was based upon symbols found in the official coat of arms owned by Portsmouth City Council.

American club Philadelphia Union has 13 stars that represent the 13 original colonies of the United States. Fellow Major League Soccer franchise Montreal Impact had four stars on their badge, which were symbolic of the nationalities of the peoples who founded the city of Montreal, prior to rebranding as CF Montreal. The four nations are regularly used in Montreal imagery, as the city flag and coat of arms both reference them. Minnesota United FC, who also play in Major League Soccer feature a star on their crest representing L'Étoile du Nord, the official motto of the state of Minnesota and the source of the state nickname, The North Star State.

The badge of Peñarol of Uruguay has 11 stars for the 11 players.

Lithuanian basketball club BC Pieno žvaigždės (lit. translation Milk Stars) featured two integrated varied stars throughout its existence, as an echo to the brand and adaptive logo elements of the title sponsor-part owner namesake dairy of the city. The city's handball club, also a namesake on such grounds, uses the actual logo of the company featuring three stars.

The badge introduced by Manchester City in 1997 had three stars to give it a "more continental feel". The 3 stars do not represent titles or trophies. City brought in a new club badge in 2016 with no stars on it. Sivasspor of Turkey also has three stars on their badge. They do not represent any championships either.

Panathinaikos has two stars inside its badge, but they do not represent any titles. For the start of the 2002–03 season, the badge of Panathinaikos also had three stars above its badge in addition to the two stars inside of it. One gold representing the team's partaking in the 1971 European Cup Final, and two silver stars representing the team's participation at the 1985 European Cup semi-finals and the 1996 UEFA Champions League semi-finals respectively. Because none of the three stars represented titles or trophies but merely club campaigns, opposition fans but also Panathinaikos fans in Greece mocked this, and the stars were removed shortly thereafter, leaving only the two stars inside the badge.

Panachaiki has three gold stars above its emblem, but they represent "three centuries of existence" instead of actual titles.

Following the crash of LaMia Flight 2933, Brazilian club Chapecoense incorporated a star into its badge as a tribute to those who perished in the incident.

Yeovil Town added three stars above its crest for 2017–18, for every five seasons they have remained in the English Football League.

Forest Green Rovers added three stars to the back of the neck area for 2018–19, to denote progression in the EFL. One star is coloured for promotion to League Two and the other two are faded until they reach the Championship.

== See also ==
- FIFA Champions Badge
