= 2020 Campeonato Rondoniense =

Campeonato Rondoniense
- Season: 2020
- Champions: Porto Velho
- 2021 Copa do Brasil: Porto Velho
- 2021 Copa Verde: Real Ariquemes
- 2021 Série D: Porto Velho; Real Ariquemes
- Matches: 50
- Goals: 110 (2.2 per match)
- Top goalscorer: Ariel (5 goals)

The 2020 Campeonato Rondoniense de Futebol Profissional Série“A” was the 75th edition and the 30th professional edition of the state championship of Rondônia organized by FFER.

The championship began on 1 February and ended on 5 December. On 17 March, FFER suspended the championship for 15 days due to the COVID-19 pandemic in Brazil, but on 1 April after a new meeting with some clubs, via videotelephony, FFER decided to extend the suspension indefinitely. Finally, the tournament resumed behind closed doors on 7 November.

Porto Velho won their first Campeonato Rondoniense title after defeating Real Ariquemes 3–1 on aggregate in the finals. As champions, Porto Velho qualified for the 2021 Copa do Brasil, while the runners-up, Real Ariquemes, qualified for the 2021 Copa Verde. Both teams qualified for the 2021 Série D.

== Format ==
In the first stage, the 11 teams were divided into two regionalized groups. Each group was played on a home-and-away round-robin basis. The teams were ranked according to the following criteria: 1. Points (3 points for a win, 1 point for a draw, and 0 points for a loss); 2. Wins; 3. Head-to-head results (only between two teams); 4. Goal difference; 5. Goals scored; 6. Fewest red cards; 7. Fewest yellow cards; 8. Draw in the headquarters of the FFER. The top two teams of each group advanced to the semi-finals.

In the semi-finals and the finals, each tie was played on a home-and-away two-legged basis. The finals were played with the best overall performance team hosting the second leg. In the final stages, if tied on aggregate, the penalty shoot-out would be used to determine the winner.

Initially, the teams with the lowest number of points of each group would be relegated to the Série B do Campeonato Rondoniense de 2021. However, FFER cancelled the relegations due to the suspension of the Campeonato caused by coronavirus pandemic.

== Participating teams ==
Originally eleven teams played the first stage, but after the suspension due to the COVID-19 pandemic only four teams remained in the tournament.

=== Team information ===
Teams in italic withdrew from the tournament during the suspension due to the COVID-19 pandemic.

Team	City	2019 result	Stadium	Capacity	Titles (last)	Part.
Barcelona	Vilhena	10th (Série A)	Portal da Amazônia	5,000	0	4
Genus	Porto Velho	6th (Série A)	Aluízio Ferreira —^{[a]}|Arlindo Braz	7,000 – 2,000	1 (2015)	25
Guajará	Guajará-Mirim	9th (Série A)	João Saldanha — ^{[b]}Clímacão	3,000 – 1,000	1 (2000)	10
Guaporé	Rolim de Moura	5th (Série A)	Cassolão	5,000	0	2
Ji-Paraná	Ji-Paraná	2nd (Série A)	Biancão	5,000	9 (2012)	25
Pimentense	Pimenta Bueno	Did not participate	Luizinho Turatti —^{[d]}Cassolão	4,000 – 5,000	0	—
Porto Velho	Porto Velho	4th (Série A)	Aluízio Ferreira —^{[c]}Nenenzão	7,000 – 4,000	0	2
Real Ariquemes	Ariquemes	3rd (Série A)	Gentil Valério	5,000	2 (2018)	5
Rondoniense	Porto Velho	7th (Série A)	Aluízio Ferreira —^{[c]}Nenenzão	7,000 – 4,000	1 (2016)	5
União Cacoalense	Cacoal	8th (Série A)	Aglair Tonelli	8,000	2 (2004)	—
Vilhenense	Vilhena	1st (Série A)	Portal da Amazônia	5,000	1 (2019)	3

=== Managers ===
Team	Manager
Barcelona	(Brazil) Márcio Parreiras
Genus	(Brazil) Bruno Monteiro (1st—5th) (Brazil) Ocimar Esteves (6th—)
Guajará	(Brazil) Tinho Damasceno
Guaporé	(Brazil) Fábio Luiz (1st—3rd) (Brazil) Paulo Roberto Miúdo (4th—7th)
Ji-Paraná	(Brazil) Luiz Carlos (1st—5th) (Brazil) Bruno Monteiro (6th—)
Pimentense	(Brazil) Heder Palmonari
Porto Velho	(Brazil) Wesley Edson (1st—)
Real Ariquemes	(Brazil) Éverton Goiano (1st—)
Rondoniense	(Brazil) Luciano Mattos
União Cacoalense	(Brazil) Jorge Saran (1st—3rd) (Brazil) Nei César (4th—)
Vilhenense	(Brazil) Tiago Batizoco

==== Managerial changes ====
Team	Predecessor	Reason	Date	Last match	Round	Position	Successor	Ref.
Guaporé	(Brazil) Fábio Luiz	Sacked	16 February	Guaporé 1–2 Barcelona	3rd	6th (Group B)	(Brazil) Paulo Roberto Miúdo	
União Cacoalense	(Brazil) Jorge Saran	Sacked	21 February	Pimentense 0–0 União Cacoalense	3rd	4th (Group B)	(Brazil) Nei César	
Ji-Paraná	(Brazil) Luiz Carlos	Sacked	2 March	Guaporé 2–2 Ji-Paraná	5th	3rd (Group B)	(Brazil) Bruno Monteiro	
Genus	(Brazil) Bruno Monteiro	Hired by Ji-Paraná	3 March	Genus 2–2 Rondoniense	5th	4th (Group A)	(Brazil) Ocimar Esteves	
Vilhenense	(Brazil) Tiago Batizoco	Sacked	27 March	Vilhenense 1–0 Guaporé	7th	1st (Group B)		

== First stage ==
=== Group A ===
Pos	Team	Pld	W	D	L	GF	GA	GD	Pts	Qualification	POR	REA	RON	GEN	GUA
1	Porto Velho	8	5	3	0	11	1	+10	18	Advance to semi-finals		0–0	2–0	2–1	2–0
2	Real Ariquemes	8	5	2	1	9	3	+6	17	Advance to semi-finals	0–0		1–0	2–0	1–3
3	Rondoniense	6	1	1	4	5	9	−4	4		0–3^{[1]}	0–1		^{[2]}	3–0
4	Genus	6	1	1	4	5	11	−6	4		0–2	0–3^{[1]}	2–2		2–0
5	Guajará	6	1	1	4	3	9	−6	4		0–0	0–1	^{[2]}	^{[2]}	

Source: FFER
Rules for classification: 1) points; 2) wins; 3) head-to-head results (only between two teams) 4) goal difference; 5) goals scored; 6) fewest red cards; 7) fewest yellow cards; 8) draw.

^{1} Walkover
^{2} Match not played

=== Group B ===
Pos	Team	Pld	W	D	L	GF	GA	GD	Pts	Qualification	JIP	UNI	VIL	PIM	BAR	GUA
1	Ji-Paraná	10	6	4	0	19	5	+14	22	Advance to semi-finals		1–0	3–0^{[a]}	3–0	2–2	3–0^{[a]}
2	União Cacoalense	10	6	3	1	15	3	+12	21	Advance to semi-finals	1–1		1–0	3–0^{[a]}	2–0	1–0
3	Vilhenense	8	4	2	2	8	7	+1	14		0–0	1–1		2–1	^{[b]}	1–0
4	Pimentense	9	1	3	5	6	17	−11	6		0–3^{[a]}	0–0	^{[b]}		3–2	1–1
5	Barcelona	8	1	2	5	7	15	−8	5		0–1	0–3^{[a]}	0–2	1–1		^{[b]}
6	Guaporé	9	1	2	6	7	15	−8	5		2–2	0–3^{[a]}	1–2	2–0	1–2	

Source: FFER
Rules for classification: 1) points; 2) wins; 3) head-to-head results (only between two teams) 4) goal difference; 5) goals scored; 6) fewest red cards; 7) fewest yellow cards; 8) draw.

^{a} Walkover
^{b} Match not played

== Final stages ==
=== Semi-finals ===
Team 1	Agg.	Team 2	1st leg	2nd leg
União Cacoalense	2–2 (2–3 p)	Porto Velho	1–0	1–2
Real Ariquemes	4–3	Ji-Paraná	3–1	1–2

==== Group C ====
14 November 2020
16:00

União Cacoalense	1–0	Porto Velho
Wellinghton 90+2'	Report

Estádio Aglair Tonelli, Cacoal
Attendance: 0
Referee: Jonathan Antero Silva

18 November 2020
10:30

Porto Velho	2–1	União Cacoalense
Emerson Bacas 15'; Rennã 90+4'	Report	Wellinghton 83'
Penalties
Sorbara (penalty scored); Willian (penalty scored); Alex Ricardo (penalty missed); Maciel Cabelo (penalty scored); Emerson Bacas (penalty missed)	3–2	(penalty scored) Jone Chulapa; (penalty missed) Diogo Oliveira; (penalty scored) Lucão; (penalty missed) Márcio Rozário; (penalty missed) Maycon

Estádio Aluízio Ferreira, Porto Velho
Attendance: 0
Referee: Maicon Pessoa de Souza

Porto Velho advanced to the finals.

==== Group D ====
17 November 2020
16:00

Real Ariquemes	3–1	Ji-Paraná
Alesson 3'; Wilker 64'; Douglas 76'	Report	Maranhão 14'

Estádio Gentil Valério, Ariquemes
Attendance: 0
Referee: Angleison Marcos Monteiro

25 November 2020
15:00

Ji-Paraná	2–1	Real Ariquemes
Lidio 66'; Maranhão 85'	Report	Wilker 31'

Biancão, Ji-Paraná
Attendance: 0
Referee: Fledes Rodrigues Santos

Real Ariquemes advanced to the finals.

=== Finals ===
Team 1	Agg.	Team 2	1st leg	2nd leg
Porto Velho	3–1	Real Ariquemes	2–1	1–0

==== Matches ====
28 November 2020
15:30

Porto Velho	2–1	Real Ariquemes
Ariel 2'; Lagoa 88'	Report	Batista 90+3'

Estádio Aluízio Ferreira, Porto Velho
Attendance: 0
Referee: Ricardo Marques (Minas Gerais)

5 December 2020
16:00

Real Ariquemes	0–1	Porto Velho
	Report	Emerson Bacas 23'

Estádio Gentil Valério, Ariquemes
Attendance: 0
Referee: Rafael Traci (Santa Catarina)

== Statistics ==
=== Top goalscorers ===
Rank	Player	Team	Goals
1	(Brazil) Ariel	Vilhenense/Porto Velho	5
2	(Brazil) Maranhão	Ji-Paraná	4
2	(Brazil) Watthimen	Ji-Paraná	4
4	(Brazil) Alesson	Rondoniense/Real Ariquemes	3
4	(Brazil) Emerson Bacas	Porto Velho	3
4	(Brazil) Marcos Vitorino	Pimentense	3
4	(Brazil) Matheus Oliveira	Barcelona	3
4	(Brazil) Raí	Real Ariquemes	3
9	(Brazil) Janilson Xana	Rondoniense	2
9	(Brazil) Marco Aurélio	Guaporé	2
9	(Brazil) Marcos Malta	Genus	2
9	(Brazil) Rennã	Porto Velho	2
9	(Brazil) Wellinghton	União Cacoalense	2
9	(Brazil) Wilker	Real Ariquemes	2

=== Highest attendance ===
Nº	Attendance	Home	Score	Away	Stadium	City	Date	Round
1	1,650	União Cacoalense	1–1	Ji-Paraná	Aglair Tonelli	Cacoal	8 February	2ª Round
2	1,419	União Cacoalense	1–0	Vilhenense	Aglair Tonelli	Cacoal	8 March	6ª Round
3	1,340	Ji-Paraná	1–0	União Cacoalense	Biancão	Ji-Paraná	15 March	7ª Round
4	1,000	Ji-Paraná	2–2	Barcelona	Biancão	Ji-Paraná	2 February	1ª Round
5	829	União Cacoalense	2–0	Barcelona	Aglair Tonelli	Cacoal	29 February	5ª Round
6	681	Ji-Paraná	3–0	Pimentense	Biancão	Ji-Paraná	23 February	4ª Round
7	628	Guajará	0–0	Porto Velho	Clímacão	Nova Mamoré	9 February	2ª Round
8	600	Guaporé	1–2	Vilhenense	Cassolão	Rolim de Moura	8 February	2ª Round
9	541	Guaporé	2–0	Pimentense	Cassolão	Rolim de Moura	8 March	6ª Round
10	500	Guaporé	2–2	Ji-Paraná	Cassolão	Rolim de Moura	1 March	5ª Round

== Broadcasting rights ==
The most important matches, including the finals, will be broadcast by RedeTV! Rondônia and Globoesporte.com in addition to radio stations of Rondônia.

== See also ==
- «Campeonato Rondoniense 2020 tem clubes definidos»
- campeonato-rondoniense-de-futebol
- site da tabela do campeonato rondoniense de futebol
- site dos campeonatos da Região Norte do Brasil de futebol
