= 2023 Campeonato Rondoniense =

Campeonato Rondoniense
- Season: 2023
- Champions: Porto Velho
- Relegated: Rondoniense
- Série D: Porto Velho
- Copa do Brasil: Porto Velho; Ji-Paraná
- Copa Verde: Porto Velho
- Matches played: 36
- Goals scored: 68 (1.89 per match)

The 2023 Campeonato Rondoniense was the 78th edition of Rondônia's top professional football league. The competition started on 25 February and ended on 20 May. Porto Velho won the championship for the 3rd time.

== Participating teams ==
Locations of the 2023 Campeonato Rondoniense teams

Club	Home City	2022 Result
Sport Club Genus	Porto Velho	3rd
Guaporé Futebol Clube	Rolim de Moura	3rd (2nd Division)
Ji-Paraná Futebol Clube	Ji-Paraná	2nd (2nd Division)
Porto Velho Esporte Clube	Porto Velho	4th
Real Ariquemes Esporte Clube	Ariquemes	1st
Rondoniense Social Clube	Porto Velho	5th
Sociedade Esportiva União Cacoalense	Cacoal	2nd
Vilhenense Esportivo Clube	Vilhena	1st (2nd Division)

Note

- Pimentense (6th in 2022) withdrew from the tournament and was replaced by Guaporé.

== First stage ==
Pos	Team	Pld	W	D	L	GF	GA	GD	Pts	Qualification or relegation
1	Porto Velho (C, A)	7	5	1	1	13	5	+8	16	Champion of the First stage and advance to the Second stage
2	União Cacoalense (A)	7	5	0	2	11	5	+6	15	Advance to the Second stage
3	Real Ariquemes (A)	7	4	1	2	10	5	+5	13	Advance to the Second stage
4	Ji-Paraná (A)	7	3	2	2	8	4	+4	11	Advance to the Second stage
5	Guaporé	7	3	1	3	5	4	+1	10	
6	Vilhenense	7	2	3	2	4	6	−2	9	
7	Genus	7	1	1	5	4	15	−11	4	
8	Rondoniense (R)	7	0	1	6	1	12	−11	1	2023 Rondoniense 2nd Division

Source: Globo Esporte
(A) Advance to a further round; (C) Champions; (R) Relegated

== Second stage ==
=== Semi-finals ===
Team 1	Agg.	Team 2	1st leg	2nd leg
Ji-Paraná	2–2 (3–2 p)	Porto Velho	2–1	0–1
Real Ariquemes	2–0	União Cacoalense	0–0	2–0

=== Finals ===
Team 1	Agg.	Team 2	1st leg	2nd leg
Ji-Paraná	3–2	Real Ariquemes	1–0	2–2

== Finals ==
14 May 2023
15:30 UTC –4

Ji-Paraná	0–1	Porto Velho
		William Amendoim 14'

Biancão, Ji-Paraná
Attendance: 3,357
Referee: Angleison Marcos Vieira Monteiro
20 May 2023
15:00 UTC –4

Porto Velho	0–0	Ji-Paraná

Aluizão, Porto Velho
Attendance: 2,700
Referee: Jonathan Antero Silva

Porto Velho won 1–0 on aggregate.
