= 2013 Campeonato Rondoniense =

Campeonato Rondoniense de Futebol
- Season: 2013
- Champions: Vilhena
- Relegated: Ji-Paraná
- Copa do Brasil: Vilhena
- Série D: Genus
- Matches played: 38
- Goals scored: 108 (2.84 per match)

The 2013 Campeonato Rondoniense de Futebol was the 23rd edition of the Rondônia's top professional football league. The competition began on March 17, and ended on June 1. Vilhena won the championship by the 4th time. while Ji-Paraná was relegated.

== Format ==
On the first stage, all teams play against each other in a double round-robin. The best four teams advances to the semifinals. The semifinals and the finals are played in two-legged ties.

=== Qualifications ===
The champion qualifies to the Copa do Brasil. The team with the best record in the championship qualify to the Série D.

== Participating teams ==
Club	Home city	2012 result
Ariquemes	Ariquemes	4th
Espigão	Espigão d'Oeste	2nd
Genus	Porto Velho	5th
Ji-Paraná	Ji-Paraná	1st
Pimentense	Pimenta Bueno	1st (2nd division)
Rolim de Moura	Rolim de Moura	6th
Vilhena	Vilhena	3rd

Moto Esporte Clube withdrawn its participation because its stadium was not fit for matches, according to the city's firefighters.

== First stage ==
=== Standings ===
Pos	Team	Pld	W	D	L	GF	GA	GD	Pts	Qualification or relegation
1	Pimentense	12	6	3	3	24	17	+7	21	Advanced to the Final stage
2	Genus	12	5	5	2	24	17	+7	20	Advanced to the Final stage
3	Vilhena	12	5	2	5	15	13	+2	17	Advanced to the Final stage
4	Ariquemes	12	4	7	1	15	12	+3	16 (Note: Ariquemes lost 3 points due to use of an irregular player.)	Advanced to the Final stage
5	Rolim de Moura	12	5	0	7	14	23	−9	15	
6	Espigão	12	4	3	5	16	19	−3	15	
7	Ji-Paraná	12	1	4	7	12	19	−7	7	Relegated

Rules for classification: 1) points; 2) goal difference; 3) number of goals scored.

=== Results ===
Home \ Away	ARI	ESP	GEN	JIP	PIM	ROL	VEC
Ariquemes		1–1	2–2	2–1	2–2	1–0	1–0
Espigão	2–1		1–1	1–0	2–4	1–0	1–0
Genus	2–2	2–2		2–2	3–2	4–1	3–2
Ji-Paraná	1–1	2–1	0–2		1–1	2–3	1–1
Pimentense	0–0	3–2	2–1	1–0		5–1	1–0
Rolim de Moura	1–2	2–1	0–2	2–1	2–1		1–0
Vilhena	0–0	3–1	1–0	2–1	3–2	3–1	

Legend: Blue = home team win; Yellow = draw; Red = away team win.

== Final stage ==
Semifinals
1	Pimentense	0	3	3
4	Ariquemes	1	1	2
2	Genus	0	2	2
3	Vilhena	1	2	3

Finals
1	Pimentense	0	3	3
3	Vilhena	5	1	5

=== Semifinals ===
==== First leg ====
May 12, 2013
18:15 UTC−03:00

Ariquemes	1–0	Pimentense
Souza 90'

Estádio Gentil Valério, Ariquemes

May 12, 2013
18:15 UTC−03:00

Vilhena	1–0	Genus
Paulo Henrique 56'

Portal da Amazônia, Vilhena

==== Second leg ====
May 19, 2013
18:15 UTC−03:00

Pimentense	3–1	Ariquemes
Dudu 47', 53', 90+1'		Souza 90+2'

Estádio Luiz Alves de Ataíde, Pimenta Bueno

May 19, 2013
18:15 UTC−03:00

Genus	2–2	Vilhena
Canhoto 5'; Quintino 55'		Edilsinho 34', 61'

Estádio Gentil Valério, Ariquemes

=== Finals ===
May 26, 2013
18:15 UTC−03:00

Vilhena	5–0	Pimentense
Cabixi 35'; Waltinho 55', 83'; Luiz Gustavo 65', 87'

Portal da Amazônia, Vilhena
Attendance: 928
Referee: Sidnei Pereira

June 1, 2013
18:15 UTC−03:00

Pimentense	3–1	Vilhena
Alex 32'; Fernandinho 55'; Geilson 73'		Cabixi 59'

Estádio Luiz Alves de Ataíde, Pimenta Bueno
Attendance: 1,262
Referee: Fledes Santos

Vilhena Esporte Clube is the champion of the 2013 Campeonato Rondoniense.
