= 2012 Campeonato Rondoniense =

Campeonato Rondoniense
- Season: 2012
- Champions: Ji-Paraná
- Copa do Brasil: Ji-Paraná
- Série D: Vilhena

The 2012 Campeonato Rondoniense was the 18th season of Rondônia's top professional football league. The competition began 31 March and ended 9 June. Esporte Clube Espigão was the defending champion.

== Format ==
The eight clubs played a double round robin format. The best four teams advanced to the semifinals.

=== Qualifications ===
The first stage champions qualified for Série D. The champion qualified for 2013 Copa do Brasil.

== Participating teams ==
Club	Home city
Ariquemes	Ariquemes
Espigão	Espigão d'Oeste
Genus	Porto Velho
Moto Clube	Porto Velho
Rolim de Moura	Rolim de Moura
Ji-Paraná	Ji-Paraná
União Cacoalense	Cacoal
Vilhena	Vilhena

== First stage ==
Pos	Team	Pld	W	D	L	GF	GA	GD	Pts	Qualification
1	Vilhena (A)	14	9	4	1	26	7	+19	31	Advanced to the semifinals
2	Espigão (A)	14	7	5	2	31	21	+10	26	Advanced to the semifinals
3	Ariquemes (A)	14	7	5	2	24	13	+11	26	Advanced to the semifinals
4	Ji-Paraná (A)	14	6	5	3	26	18	+8	23	Advanced to the semifinals
5	Genus	14	5	4	5	25	18	+7	19	
6	Moto Clube	14	5	3	6	28	24	+4	18	
7	Rolim de Moura	14	2	2	10	20	34	−14	8	
8	União Cacoalense	14	1	0	13	9	53	−44	3	

Updated to match(es) played on 24 May 2012. Source:
Rules for classification: 1) Points; 2) wins; 3) goal difference; 4) head-to-head (if two teams involved); 5) goals scored; 6) draw
(A) Advance to a further round

== Semifinals ==
Team 1	Agg.	Team 2	1st leg	2nd leg
Ji-Paraná	(pen.) 4–4	Vilhena	3–1	1–3
Ariquemes	1–4	Espigão	1–2	0–2

== Finals ==
=== Finals ===
==== First leg ====
June 07, 2012
17:00

Ji-Paraná	2-2	Espigão

Estádio Municipal José de Abreu Bianco, Ji-Paraná)

==== Second leg ====
June 10, 2012
18:00 UTC−03:00

Espigão	2-4	Ji-Paraná

Estádio Municipal Luizinho Turatti, Espigão d'Oeste

Ji-Paraná won 4-6 on aggregate
