= Campeonato Rondoniense Second Division =

Football league in Rondônia, Brazil

- Organising body: FFER
- Founded: 2005; 21 years ago
- Country: Brazil
- State: Rondônia
- Level on pyramid: 2
- Promotion to: Campeonato Rondoniense
- Current champions: Guaporé (1st title) (2024)
- Most championships: Pimentense (2 titles)
- Website: FFER Official website

The Campeonato Rondoniense Second Division is the second tier of the professional state football league in the Brazilian state of Rondônia. It is run by the Rondônia Football Federation (FFER).

== List of champions ==
Season	Champions	Runners-up
2005	Ulbra Ji-Paraná (1)	Grêmio Espigão
2006	Jaruense (1)	Ariquemes FC
2007	Ariquemes FC (1)	Rolim de Moura
2008	Espigão (1)	Shallon
2009	Moto Clube (1)	Ji-Paraná
2010	Not held	
2011	Ji-Paraná (1)	União Cacoalense
2012	Pimentense (1)	Santos
2013	União Cacoalense (1)	—N/a
2014–2020	Not held	
2021	Pimentense (2)	Genus
2022	Vilhenense (1)	Ji-Paraná
2023	Vilhena (1)	Barcelona
2024	Guaporé (1)	Rolim de Moura

== Titles by team ==
Teams in bold stills active.

Rank	Club	Winners	Winning years
1	**Pimentense**	2	2012, 2021
2	Ariquemes FC	1	2007
2	Espigão	1	2008
2	Guaporé	1	2024
2	Jaruense	1	2006
2	**Ji-Paraná**	1	2011
2	Moto Clube	1	2009
2	Ulbra	1	2005
2	**União Cacoalense**	1	2013
2	**Vilhena**	1	2023
2	Vilhenense	1	2022

=== By city ===
City	Championships	Clubs
Ji-Paraná	2	Ji-Paraná (1), Ulbra (1)
Pimenta Bueno	2	Pimentense (2)
Vilhena	2	Vilhena (1), Vilhenense (1)
Ariquemes	1	Ariquemes FC (1)
Cacoal	1	União Cacoalense (1)
Espigão d'Oeste	1	Espigão (1)
Jaru	1	Jaruense (1)
Porto Velho	1	Moto Clube (1)
Rolim de Moura	1	Guaporé (1)
