= Campeonato Rondoniense de Futebol Feminino =

Women's football league in Rondônia, Brazil

- Founded: 2002
- Country: Brazil
- Confederation: FFER
- Promotion to: Brasileiro Série A3
- Current champions: Itapuense (1st title) (2025)
- Most championships: Real Ariquemes (4 titles)
- Current: 2026

The Campeonato Rondoniense de Futebol Feminino is the women's football state championship of Rondônia state, and is contested since 2002.

== List of champions ==
Following is the list with all recognized titles of Campeonato Rondoniense Feminino:

Season	Champions	Runners-up
2002	Mocidade (1)	Juventude
2003–2007	Not held	
2008	Genus (1)	Juventus
2009	Juventus (1)	Genus
2010	Genus (2)	Juventus
2011–2012	Not held	
2013	Espigão (1)	Rolim de Moura
2014	Genus (3)	Espigão
2015	Not held	
2016	Porto Club (1)	Espigão
2017	Porto Club (2)	Barcelona
2018	Porto Velho (1)	Real Ariquemes
2019	Real Ariquemes (1)	Porto Velho
2020	Real Ariquemes (2)	Genus
2021	Real Ariquemes (3)	Barcelona
2022	Real Ariquemes (4)	Porto Velho
2023	Porto Velho (2)	Vilhenense
2024	Rolim de Moura (1)	Genus
2025	Itapuense (1)	Brazuca

== Titles by team ==
Teams in bold stills active.

Rank	Club	Winners	Winning years
1	**Real Ariquemes**	4	2019, 2020, 2021, 2022
2	**Genus**	3	2008, 2010, 2014
3	Porto Club	2	2016, 2017
3	**Porto Velho**	2	2018, 2023
5	Espigão	1	2013
5	Juventus	1	2009
5	Mocidade	1	2002
5	**Rolim de Moura**	1	2024
5	**Itapuense**	1	2025

=== By city ===
City	Championships	Clubs
Porto Velho	8	Genus (3), Porto Club (2), Porto Velho (2), Juventus (1), Mocidade (1)
Ariquemes	4	Real Ariquemes (4)
Espigão d'Oeste	1	Espigão (1)
Rolim de Moura	1	Rolim de Moura (1)
Itapuã do Oeste	1	Itapuense
