= Wilker (footballer, born 1995) =

Brazilian footballer

Personal information
- Full name: Wilker Henrique da Silva
- Date of birth: 26 October 1995 (age 31)
- Place of birth: Franca, Brazil
- Height: 1.88 m (6 ft 2 in)
- Position: Forward

Youth career
- –2010: Botafogo-SP
- 2011–2013: Ponte Preta

Senior career*
Years	Team	Apps	(Gls)
2014	Ponte Preta	1	(0)
2015	Bragantino	4	(1)
2016	CAP de Uberlândia	16	(2)
2018	União Barbarense	15	(2)
2018	Catanduva		
2019	Paragominas	10	(2)
2019	Bragantino-PA	1	(0)
2019–2020	Simba		
2020	→ Castanhal (loan)	6	(0)
2020	Ypiranga-AP	2	(0)
2020	Real Ariquemes	3	(2)
2021	Gavião Kyikatejê	3	(0)
2021	Ji-Paraná	6	(4)
2021	Galvez	1	(0)
2022	União Cacoalense	11	(3)
2022	Rio Branco	10	(3)
2022	Ivinhema	5	(2)
2023	Nam Định	1	(0)
- * Club domestic league appearances and goals as of 12:09, 7 April 2023 (UTC)

Wilker Henrique da Silva (born 26 October 1995), commonly known as Wilker, is a Brazilian professional footballer who played as a forward.

== Career statistics ==
As of 4 July 2019

Club	Season	League			State League		Cup		Other		Total	
Club	Season	Division	Apps	Goals	Apps	Goals	Apps	Goals	Apps	Goals	Apps	Goals
Ponte Preta	2014	Série B	1	0	0	0	1 (Note: Appearances in the Copa do Brasil)	1	0	0	2	1
Bragantino	2015	Série B	0	0	4 (Note: Appearances in the Campeonato Paulista)	1	1	0	0	0	5	1
União Barbarense	2018	–			15 (Note: Appearances in the Campeonato Paulista A3)	2	0	0	0	0	15	2
Paragominas	2019	–			10 (Note: Appearances in the Campeonato Paraense)	2	0	0	0	0	10	2
Bragantino-PA	2019	Série D	1	0	0	0	2	0	0	0	3	0
Career total			2	0	29	5	4	1	0	0	35	6
