= Jean Filder =

Haitian footballer (born 1994)

Personal information
- Full name: Jean Richard Filder
- Date of birth: 7 December 1994 (age 31)
- Place of birth: Petit-Goâve, Haiti
- Height: 1.90 m (6 ft 3 in)
- Position: Forward

Team information
- Current team: Madureira

Senior career*
Years	Team	Apps	(Gls)
- Sheikh Russel
- Santo André
- São Bernardo
2019	Prudentópolis		
2019	Rolândia		
2020	Barcelona-RO	6	(0)
2020	Paulista	4	(1)
2020	Campo Grande-CE	7	(1)
2021–	Madureira	1	(0)
- * Club domestic league appearances and goals as of 18:04, 24 March 2021 (UTC)

Jean Richard Filder (born 7 December 1994) is a Haitian professional footballer who plays as a forward for Madureira.

== Career statistics ==
=== Club ===
As of 24 March 2021.

Club	Season	League			State League		Cup		Other		Total	
Club	Season	Division	Apps	Goals	Apps	Goals	Apps	Goals	Apps	Goals	Apps	Goals
Barcelona-RO	2020	–			6 (Note: Appearances in the Campeonato Rondoniense)	0	0	0	0	0	6	0
Paulista	2020	–			4 (Note: Appearances in the Campeonato Paulista A3)	1	0	0	0	0	4	1
Campo Grande-CE	2020	–			7 (Note: Appearances in the Campeonato Cearense - Série B)	1	0	0	0	0	7	1
Madureira	2021	Série D	0	0	1 (Note: Appearances in the Campeonato Carioca)	0	0	0	0	0	1	0
Career total			0	0	18	2	0	0	0	0	18	2
