= Watthimen =

Brazilian footballer

Personal information
- Full name: Watthimen Ranney Lucio Patrocinio
- Date of birth: 17 July 1990 (age 36)
- Place of birth: Nova Era, Brazil
- Height: 1.71 m (5 ft 7 in)
- Positions: Attacking midfielder; forward

Youth career
- 2007–2008: Anápolis
- 2009: União Itaberaí

Senior career*
Years	Team	Apps	(Gls)
2009	Itaberaí		
2010	Atlético Goianiense	0	(0)
2010	Murici		
2010–2011	Inhumas	20	(29)
2011	Atlético Goianiense	3	(0)
2012	Duque de Caxias	11	(3)
2012	Atlético Goianiense	4	(0)
2013	Volta Redonda	3	(0)
2013	Artsul	4	(0)
2013	FF Sport		
2014	Anapolina	2	(0)
2014	Tocantins de Miracema	7	(8)
2014–2015	América de Morrinhos	14	(13)
2015	→ CRAC (loan)	0	(0)
2015	→ Trindade (loan)	4	(0)
2016	Comercial-MS	4	(0)
2017	Brasília	2	(1)
2017	Luziânia	2	(0)
2018	América de Morrinhos	6	(5)
2018	Raça		
2019	Ji-Paraná	9	(3)
2019	Jataiense	6	(0)
2020	Ji-Paraná	20	(9)
2020	União Rondonópolis	4	(0)
2021	Bragantino-PA	7	(1)
2021	Porto Velho	3	(0)
2021	Goiânia	0	(0)
2022–2023	Santa Maria-DF	14	(7)
2022	→ Ceilândia (loan)	4	(0)
2022	→ Atlético Cearense (loan)	3	(0)
2023–2024	Porto Velho	22	(4)
2024	SESP	4	(1)
- * Club domestic league appearances and goals as of 8 July 2025

Watthimen Ranney Lucio Patrocinio (born 17 July 1990), simply known as Watthimen, is a Brazilian former professional footballer who played as an attacking midfielder and forward.

== Early life ==
Born in Nova Era, Minas Gerais, Watthimen was named after the comic book series Watchmen, as his father Valdeci became a big fan in 1985.

== Career ==
Watthimen started out in the youth ranks of Anápolis FC. His good performance in the under-20 state championship caught the attention of Atlético Goianiense, a club that played in the 2012 Campeonato Brasileiro Série A. In later years, the player played for clubs in several states of Brazil, returning to prominence in Rondônia football in 2020, when he defended Ji-Paraná FC and was the championship's second-highest scorer. He returned to the state in 2023 and was a two-time state champion playing for Porto Velho EC. At the end of his career, he played for teams in the Federal District such as Santa Maria and Ceilândia.

== Honours ==
Atlético Goianiense

- Campeonato Goiano: 2011

Porto Velho

- Campeonato Rondoniense: 2023, 2024
