= Maranhão (footballer, born 1996) =

Brazilian footballer

Personal information
- Full name: Guilherme da Silva Barbosa
- Date of birth: 1 April 1996 (age 30)
- Place of birth: Balsas, Brazil
- Height: 1.83 m (6 ft 0 in)
- Position: Forward

Team information
- Current team: Ferroviária (on loan from Guarani)

Youth career
- Balsas
- 2013: Sport Recife
- 2014: Sampaio Corrêa

Senior career*
Years	Team	Apps	(Gls)
2012	Balsas		
2015	Portuguesa Santista	0	(0)
2017	Sampaio Corrêa	3	(1)
2017	Primavera	8	(2)
2018	Rondoniense	13	(3)
2019	Real Ariquemes	10	(5)
2020	Ji-Paraná	14	(5)
2021	Olímpia	8	(1)
2021–2023	Brasília	6	(3)
2022	→ São Caetano (loan)	13	(3)
2023	→ Matonense (loan)	14	(8)
2023	→ Itabirito (loan)	5	(2)
2023	→ Grêmio Prudente (loan)	0	(0)
2024	Grêmio Prudente	18	(11)
2024	→ Maringá (loan)	17	(4)
2025	Maringá	34	(9)
2025	→ Atlético Goianiense (loan)	7	(1)
2026–	Guarani	16	(3)
2026–	→ Ferroviária (loan)	8	(2)
- * Club domestic league appearances and goals as of 9 November 2026

Guilherme da Silva Barbosa (born 1 April 1996), commonly known as Maranhão, is a Brazilian footballer who plays as a forward for Ferroviária, on loan from Guarani.

== Career ==
Born in Balsas, Maranhão, which earned him his nickname, he began playing with hometown side Balsas in 2012, before subsequently returning to youth setup with Sport Recife and Sampaio Corrêa; at that time, he was only known as Guilherme. After a period at Portuguesa Santista, he had to return to his hometown to work in farming, before returning to Sampaio in December 2016.

After ending the 2017 season at Primavera, Maranhão moved to Rondônia and joined Rondoniense. He continued to play in the state in the following years, representing Real Ariquemes and Ji-Paraná, before signing for Olímpia in 2021.

Maranhão agreed to a deal with Brasília in September 2021, before being loaned out to São Caetano for the 2022 season. He was announced in the squad of Matonense for the 2023 campaign, but later played for Itabirito and Grêmio Prudente in that year.

Bought outright by Prudente in 2024, Maranhão helped the club to achieve promotion from the Campeonato Paulista Série A3 by scoring 11 goals, and subsequently moved on loan to Maringá on 1 May of that year. Regularly used as the latter side achieved promotion to the Série C, he signed a permanent two-year deal with them on 8 November 2024.

On 1 September 2025, Maranhão was loaned to Série B side Atlético Goianiense until the end of the year. On 12 December, he signed a two-year contract with Guarani in the third division.

== Career statistics ==
As of 21 January 2026

Club	Season	League			State League		Cup		Continental		Other		Total	
Club	Season	Division	Apps	Goals	Apps	Goals	Apps	Goals	Apps	Goals	Apps	Goals	Apps	Goals
Sampaio Corrêa	2017	Série C	—		3	1	3	0	—		4 (Note: Appearance(s) in Copa do Nordeste)	1	10	2
Primavera	2017	Paulista 2ª Divisão	—		8	2	—		—		—		8	2
Rondoniense	2018	Rondoniense	—		13	3	—		—		—		13	3
Real Ariquemes	2019	Série D	6	0	4	5	1	0	—		—		11	5
Ji-Paraná	2020	Série D	9	1	5	4	—		—		—		14	5
Olímpia	2021	Paulista A3	—		8	1	—		—		—		8	1
Brasília	2021	Brasiliense 2ª Divisão	—		6	3	—		—		—		6	3
São Caetano (loan)	2022	Paulista A2	—		13	3	—		—		8 (Note: Appearance(s) in Copa Paulista)	2	21	5
Matonense (loan)	2023	Paulista A3	—		14	8	—		—		—		14	8
Itabirito (loan)	2023	Mineiro Módulo II	—		5	2	—		—		—		5	2
Grêmio Prudente	2023	Paulista A3	—		—		—		—		4	1	4	1
Grêmio Prudente	2024	Paulista A3	—		18	11	—		—		—		18	11
Grêmio Prudente	Total		—		18	11	—		—		4	1	22	12
Maringá	2024	Série D	17	4	—		—		—		—		17	4
Maringá	2025	Série C	17	6	17	3	4	3	—		—		38	12
Maringá	Total		34	10	17	3	4	3	—		—		55	16
Atlético Goianiense (loan)	2025	Série B	7	1	—		—		—		—		7	1
Guarani	2026	Paulista	0	0	2	0	0	0	—		—		2	0
Career total			56	12	116	46	8	3	0	0	16	4	196	65
