= 2021 Campeonato Brasileiro Série D =

2021 Brazilian soccer competition

Campeonato Brasileiro Série D
- Season: 2021
- Dates: 26 May – 13 November 2021
- Champions: Aparecidense (1st title)
- Promoted: ABC; Aparecidense; Atlético Cearense; Campinense
- Matches played: 518
- Goals scored: 1,259 (2.43 per match)
- Top goalscorer: Gabriel Santos (13 goals)
- Biggest home win: ABC 9–1 Caucaia; Group A3, R10, 9 August
- Biggest away win: Águia Negra 0–6 Caldense; Group A6, R9, 1 August
- Highest scoring: 10 goals ABC 9–1 Caucaia; Group A3, R10, 9 August
- Highest attendance: 7,333; América de Natal 0–0 Campinense; Quarter-finals, 1st leg, 9 October
- Lowest attendance: 126; Esportivo 1–2 Ferroviária; Round of 16, 1st leg, 25 September
- Total attendance: 36,004
- Average attendance: 2,250

The 2021 Campeonato Brasileiro Série D was a football competition held in Brazil, equivalent to the fourth division. The competition began on 26 May and ended on 13 November 2021.

Sixty-eight teams competed in the tournament. Sixty-four teams qualified from their state leagues and cups, and four relegated from the 2020 Campeonato Brasileiro Série C (Boa Esporte, Imperatriz, São Bento and Treze).

The match Imperatriz v 4 de Julho, played at the Estádio Frei Epifânio D'Abadia (Imperatriz) on 28 August 2021 (Group A2 13th round), was finished in the 76th minute (0–0) after a strong storm caused the partial collapse of the grandstand roof located over the press booths and changing rooms of the teams and referees.

ABC, Aparecidense, Atlético Cearense and Campinense qualified for the semi-finals and were promoted to the 2022 Campeonato Brasileiro Série C.

In the finals, Aparecidense defeated Campinense 2–1 on aggregate to win their first title.

== Teams ==
Location of teams in 2021 Série D

=== Federation ranking ===
The number of teams from each state was chosen based on the CBF State Ranking.

Rank	Federation	Coeff.	Teams	Notes
1	(São Paulo (state)) São Paulo	84,516	4	+1 (C)
2	(Rio de Janeiro (state)) Rio de Janeiro	50,134	3	
3	Rio Grande do Sul	45,127	3	
4	Minas Gerais	40,542	3	+1 (C)
5	(Paraná (state)) Paraná	33,927	3	
6	(Santa Catarina (state)) Santa Catarina	28,094	3	
7	Goiás	21,381	3	
8	Ceará	21,084	3	
9	Bahia	20,528	3	
10	Pernambuco	17,944	2	
11	Alagoas	12,040	2	
12	Mato Grosso	10,510	2	
13	Pará	8,790	2	
14	Maranhão	7,941	2	+1 (C)
15	Rio Grande do Norte	5,924	2	
16	Paraíba	5,440	2	+1 (C)
17	Sergipe	4,662	2	
18	(Acre (state)) Acre	3,294	2	
19	(Amazonas (Brazilian state)) Amazonas	2,757	2	
20	Piauí	2,491	2	
21	(Federal District (Brazil)) Distrito Federal	2,237	2	
22	Espírito Santo	1,921	2	
23	Mato Grosso do Sul	1,895	2	
24	Rondônia	1,790	2	
25	Roraima	1,769	2	
26	Tocantins	1,648	2	
27	Amapá	1,584	2	

=== Participating teams ===
Teams in italic played the preliminary stage. The teams were:

Federation	Team	Home city	Qualification method
(Acre (state)) Acre	Galvez	Rio Branco	2020 Campeonato Acriano champions
(Acre (state)) Acre	Atlético Acreano	Rio Branco	2020 Campeonato Acriano runners-up
Alagoas	Murici	Murici	2020 Campeonato Alagoano 3rd place
Alagoas	ASA	Arapiraca	2020 Copa Alagoas champions
Amapá	Ypiranga	Macapá	2020 Campeonato Amapaense champions
Amapá	Santana	Santana	2020 Campeonato Amapaense runners-up
(Amazonas (Brazilian state)) Amazonas	Penarol	Itacoatiara	2020 Campeonato Amazonense champions
(Amazonas (Brazilian state)) Amazonas	Fast Clube	Manaus	2020 Campeonato Amazonense 3rd place
Bahia	Atlético de Alagoinhas	Alagoinhas	2020 Campeonato Baiano runners-up
Bahia	Juazeirense	Juazeiro	2020 Campeonato Baiano 3rd place
Bahia	Bahia de Feira	Feira de Santana	2020 Campeonato Baiano 6th place
Ceará	Guarany de Sobral	Sobral	2020 Campeonato Cearense 4th place
Ceará	Atlético Cearense	Fortaleza	2020 Campeonato Cearense 5th place
Ceará	Caucaia	Caucaia	2020 Campeonato Cearense 6th place
Espírito Santo	Rio Branco de Venda Nova	Venda Nova do Imigrante	2020 Campeonato Capixaba champions
Espírito Santo	Rio Branco-ES^{[a]}	Vitória	2020 Campeonato Capixaba runners-up
(Federal District (Brazil)) Federal District	Gama	Gama	2020 Campeonato Brasiliense champions
(Federal District (Brazil)) Federal District	Brasiliense	Taguatinga	2020 Campeonato Brasiliense runners-up
Goiás	Goianésia	Goianésia	2020 Campeonato Goiano runners-up
Goiás	Jaraguá	Jaraguá	2020 Campeonato Goiano 3rd place
Goiás	Aparecidense	Aparecida de Goiânia	2020 Campeonato Goiano 4th place
Maranhão	Moto Club	São Luís	2020 Campeonato Maranhense runners-up
Maranhão	Juventude Samas^{[b]}	São Mateus do Maranhão	2020 Campeonato Maranhense 3rd place
Maranhão	Imperatriz	Imperatriz	2020 Série C Group A 10th place
Mato Grosso	Nova Mutum	Nova Mutum	2020 Campeonato Mato-Grossense champions
Mato Grosso	União Rondonópolis	Rondonópolis	2020 Campeonato Mato-Grossense runners-up
Mato Grosso do Sul	Águia Negra	Rio Brilhante	2020 Campeonato Sul-Mato-Grossense champions
Mato Grosso do Sul	Aquidauanense	Aquidauana	2020 Campeonato Sul-Mato-Grossense runners-up
Minas Gerais	Caldense	Poços de Caldas	2020 Campeonato Mineiro 4th place
Minas Gerais	Uberlândia	Uberlândia	2020 Campeonato Mineiro 5th place
Minas Gerais	Patrocinense	Patrocínio	2020 Campeonato Mineiro 8th place
Minas Gerais	Boa Esporte	Varginha	2020 Série C Group B 10th place
Pará	Castanhal	Castanhal	2020 Campeonato Paraense 3rd place
Pará	Paragominas	Paragominas	2020 Campeonato Paraense 4th place
Paraíba	Campinense	Campina Grande	2020 Campeonato Paraibano runners-up
Paraíba	Sousa	Sousa	2020 Campeonato Paraibano 4th place
Paraíba	Treze	Campina Grande	2020 Série C Group A 9th place
(Paraná (state)) Paraná	FC Cascavel	Cascavel	2020 Campeonato Paranaense 3rd place
(Paraná (state)) Paraná	Cianorte	Cianorte	2020 Campeonato Paranaense 4th place
(Paraná (state)) Paraná	Rio Branco-PR	Paranaguá	2020 Campeonato Paranaense 7th place
Pernambuco	Retrô	Camaragibe	2020 Campeonato Pernambucano first stage 3rd place
Pernambuco	Central^{[c]}	Caruaru	2020 Campeonato Pernambucano first stage 5th place
Piauí	4 de Julho	Piripiri	2020 Campeonato Piauiense champions
Piauí	Picos	Picos	2020 Campeonato Piauiense runners-up
(Rio de Janeiro (state)) Rio de Janeiro	Boavista	Saquarema	2020 Campeonato Carioca 4th place
(Rio de Janeiro (state)) Rio de Janeiro	Madureira	Rio de Janeiro	2020 Campeonato Carioca 6th place
(Rio de Janeiro (state)) Rio de Janeiro	Bangu^{[d]}	Rio de Janeiro	2020 Campeonato Carioca 8th place
Rio Grande do Norte	ABC	Natal	2020 Campeonato Potiguar champions
Rio Grande do Norte	América de Natal	Natal	2020 Campeonato Potiguar runners-up
Rio Grande do Sul	Caxias	Caxias do Sul	2020 Campeonato Gaúcho 3rd place
Rio Grande do Sul	Esportivo	Bento Gonçalves	2020 Campeonato Gaúcho 4th place
Rio Grande do Sul	Aimoré^{[e]}	São Leopoldo	2020 Campeonato Gaúcho 7th place
Rondônia	Porto Velho	Porto Velho	2020 Campeonato Rondoniense champions
Rondônia	Real Ariquemes	Ariquemes	2020 Campeonato Rondoniense runners-up
Roraima	São Raimundo	Boa Vista	2020 Campeonato Roraimense champions
Roraima	GAS	Caracaraí	2020 Campeonato Roraimense runners-up
(Santa Catarina (state)) Santa Catarina	Juventus	Jaraguá do Sul	2020 Campeonato Catarinense 4th place
(Santa Catarina (state)) Santa Catarina	Marcílio Dias	Itajaí	2020 Campeonato Catarinense 7th place
(Santa Catarina (state)) Santa Catarina	Joinville	Joinville	2020 Campeonato Catarinense 8th place
(São Paulo (state)) São Paulo	Santo André	Santo André	2020 Campeonato Paulista 7th place
(São Paulo (state)) São Paulo	Ferroviária	Araraquara	2020 Campeonato Paulista 11th place
(São Paulo (state)) São Paulo	Inter de Limeira	Limeira	2020 Campeonato Paulista 12th place
(São Paulo (state)) São Paulo	Portuguesa	São Paulo	2020 Copa Paulista champions
(São Paulo (state)) São Paulo	São Bento	Sorocaba	2020 Série C Group B 9th place
Sergipe	Sergipe	Aracaju	2020 Campeonato Sergipano runners-up
Sergipe	Itabaiana	Itabaiana	2020 Campeonato Sergipano 3rd place
Tocantins	Palmas	Palmas	2020 Campeonato Tocantinense champions
Tocantins	Tocantinópolis	Tocantinópolis	2020 Campeonato Tocantinense runners-up

^{a} As the 2020 Copa Espírito Santo was cancelled, its 2021 Série D berth was awarded to the best placed team in the 2020 Campeonato Capixaba not already qualified, Rio Branco-ES (2020 Campeonato Capixaba runners-up).
^{b} As the 2020 Copa FMF was cancelled, its 2021 Série D berth was awarded to the best placed team in the 2020 Campeonato Maranhense not already qualified, Juventude Samas (2020 Campeonato Maranhense 3rd place).
^{c} Salgueiro, 2020 Campeonato Pernambucano first stage runners-up, declined to participate in the Série D on 12 April 2021, being replaced by Central (2020 Campeonato Pernambucano first stage 5th place).
^{d} As the 2020 Copa Rio was cancelled, its 2021 Série D berth was awarded to the best placed team in the 2020 Campeonato Carioca not already qualified, Bangu (2020 Campeonato Carioca 8th place).
^{e} Originally a finalist of 2020 Copa FGF would qualify for 2021 Série D, but FGF decided to award the Copa FGF berth to the best placed team in the 2020 Campeonato Gaúcho not already qualified, Aimoré (2020 Campeonato Gaúcho 7th place).

== Competition format ==
In the preliminary stage, eight teams from the worst ranked federations in the CBF ranking were drawn into four ties, with the winners of each tie advancing to the group stage. In the group stage, the remaining 60 teams and the 4 four teams qualified from the preliminary stage were divided into eight groups of eight organized regionally. Top four teams qualified for the round of 32. From the round of 32 on the competition was played as a knock-out tournament with each round contested over two legs.

== Preliminary stage ==
It was played from 26 to 30 May. The lowest-seeded teams from the eight worst ranked federations in the 2021 CBF ranking (Piauí, Distrito Federal, Espírito Santo, Mato Grosso do Sul, Rondônia, Roraima, Tocantins and Amapá) competed to decide four places in the group stage.

Each tie was played on a home-and-away two-legged basis. If tied on aggregate, the away goals rule would not be used, extra time would not be played, and the penalty shoot-out would be used to determine the winners (Regulations Article 18).

=== Matches ===
Team 1	Agg.	Team 2	1st leg	2nd leg
Santana (Amapá)	1–5	(Roraima) GAS	1–2	0–3
Tocantinópolis (Tocantins)	3–3 (4–1 p)	(Piauí) Picos	2–0	1–3
Real Ariquemes (Rondônia)	1–5	(Federal District (Brazil)) Brasiliense	0–2	1–3
Aquidauanense (Mato Grosso do Sul)	1–6	(Espírito Santo) Rio Branco-ES	1–4	0–2

== Group stage ==
In the group stage, each group was played on a home-and-away round-robin basis. The teams were ranked according to points (3 points for a win, 1 point for a draw, and 0 points for a loss). If tied on points, the following criteria would be used to determine the ranking: 1. Wins; 2. Goal difference; 3. Goals scored; 4. Head-to-head (if the tie was only between two teams); 5. Fewest red cards; 6. Fewest yellow cards; 7. Draw in the headquarters of the Brazilian Football Confederation (Regulations Article 13).

The top four teams qualified for the round of 32.

=== Group A1 ===
Pos	Team	Pld	W	D	L	GF	GA	GD	Pts	Qualification	CAS	SAO	PEN	GAL	FAS	YPI	GAS	ATL
1	(Pará) Castanhal	14	11	3	0	33	11	+22	36	Advance to round of 32		1–1	1–1	4–1	2–1	2–1	5–0	3–1
2	(Roraima) São Raimundo	14	8	5	1	28	11	+17	29	Advance to round of 32	1–2		2–1	3–1	1–1	4–0	1–1	7–1
3	(Amazonas (Brazilian state)) Penarol	14	7	3	4	23	14	+9	24	Advance to round of 32	0–1	1–1		2–0	2–1	1–1	2–1	5–0
4	(Acre (state)) Galvez	14	7	1	6	22	24	−2	22	Advance to round of 32	1–5	0–1	1–3		2–2	2–0	2–1	2–1
5	(Amazonas (Brazilian state)) Fast Clube	14	3	6	5	21	20	+1	15		1–2	0–0	3–2	1–2		3–3	4–0	1–0
6	(Amapá) Ypiranga	14	3	4	7	13	22	−9	13		0–2	0–1	1–0	0–1	1–1		0–0	2–1
7	(Roraima) GAS	14	2	3	9	12	29	−17	9		2–2	0–2	0–1	0–3	3–2	1–2		2–0
8	(Acre (state)) Atlético Acreano	14	2	1	11	14	35	−21	7		0–1	2–3	1–2	1–4	0–0	3–2	3–1	

Source: CBF
Rules for classification: 1) points; 2) wins; 3) goal difference; 4) goals scored; 5) head-to-head results (only between 2 teams); 6) fewest red cards; 7) fewest yellow cards; 8) draw.

=== Group A2 ===
Pos	Team	Pld	W	D	L	GF	GA	GD	Pts	Qualification	GUA	4DE	PAR	MOT	PAL	IMP	JUV	TOC
1	(Ceará) Guarany de Sobral	14	9	1	4	24	16	+8	28	Advance to round of 32		3–1	1–0	4–2	2–1	1–1	2–1	2–1
2	(Piauí) 4 de Julho	14	7	3	4	18	11	+7	24	Advance to round of 32	0–2		4–0	2–0	1–2	2–0	1–0	1–1
3	(Pará) Paragominas	14	6	5	3	26	19	+7	23	Advance to round of 32	2–1	1–2		2–2	1–1	4–1	0–0	4–1
4	(Maranhão) Moto Club	14	6	3	5	20	19	+1	21	Advance to round of 32	0–2	1–0	1–4		1–0	1–1	3–1	3–0
5	(Tocantins) Palmas	14	5	3	6	19	17	+2	18		0–2	1–2	0–0	2–1		0–0	1–2	2–1
6	(Maranhão) Imperatriz	14	3	8	3	14	17	−3	17		1–0	0–0	2–2	0–1	3–2		1–1	3–2
7	(Maranhão) Juventude Samas	14	3	5	6	13	21	−8	14		2–0	0–0	1–3	0–3	0–3	1–1		3–3
8	(Tocantins) Tocantinópolis	14	1	4	9	17	31	−14	7		4–2	0–2	2–3	1–1	1–4	0–0	0–1	

Source: CBF
Rules for classification: 1) points; 2) wins; 3) goal difference; 4) goals scored; 5) head-to-head results (only between 2 teams); 6) fewest red cards; 7) fewest yellow cards; 8) draw.

=== Group A3 ===
Pos	Team	Pld	W	D	L	GF	GA	GD	Pts	Qualification	ABC	CAM	AME	ATL	SOU	CEN	TRE	CAU
1	(Rio Grande do Norte) ABC	14	9	1	4	30	13	+17	28	Advance to round of 32		2–0	3–1	0–2	4–0	2–0	2–0	9–1
2	(Paraíba) Campinense	14	7	4	3	23	12	+11	25	Advance to round of 32	0–1		3–0	3–0	1–0	2–1	0–0	5–0
3	(Rio Grande do Norte) América de Natal	14	6	4	4	25	20	+5	22	Advance to round of 32	2–3	0–0		2–0	4–1	1–0	2–2	4–2
4	(Ceará) Atlético Cearense	14	6	3	5	22	20	+2	21	Advance to round of 32	1–0	2–3	0–2		2–0	0–0	2–2	4–1
5	(Paraíba) Sousa	14	4	4	6	16	18	−2	16		2–0	3–2	0–2	2–1		0–0	0–0	7–0
6	(Pernambuco) Central	14	3	6	5	13	17	−4	15		1–1	0–1	2–1	1–3	0–0		2–1	3–2
7	(Paraíba) Treze	14	2	9	3	18	16	+2	15		0–1	0–0	2–2	1–1	1–1	2–2		3–1
8	(Ceará) Caucaia	14	2	3	9	20	51	−31	9		3–2	3–3	2–2	3–4	1–0	1–1	0–4	

Source: CBF
Rules for classification: 1) points; 2) wins; 3) goal difference; 4) goals scored; 5) head-to-head results (only between 2 teams); 6) fewest red cards; 7) fewest yellow cards; 8) draw.

=== Group A4 ===
Pos	Team	Pld	W	D	L	GF	GA	GD	Pts	Qualification	JUA	ITA	SER	RET	ATL	BAH	ASA	MUR
1	(Bahia) Juazeirense	14	7	6	1	18	9	+9	27	Advance to round of 32		1–1	0–0	1–0	1–0	2–1	2–0	2–1
2	(Sergipe) Itabaiana	14	7	5	2	22	13	+9	26	Advance to round of 32	1–1		2–1	1–2	3–1	1–2	4–1	1–0
3	Sergipe	14	6	5	3	16	8	+8	23	Advance to round of 32	0–1	0–1		1–0	1–0	4–0	2–0	2–1
4	(Pernambuco) Retrô	14	4	8	2	17	14	+3	20	Advance to round of 32	0–0	2–2	0–0		3–1	1–1	3–3	1–0
5	(Bahia) Atlético de Alagoinhas	14	4	6	4	15	17	−2	18		3–3	0–0	0–0	1–1		2–2	1–0	1–0
6	Bahia de Feira	14	3	6	5	18	20	−2	15		1–1	0–1	1–1	1–1	1–2		1–0	6–1
7	(Alagoas) ASA	14	3	3	8	12	22	−10	12		1–0	0–2	1–3	0–1	0–0	1–1		4–2
8	(Alagoas) Murici	14	1	3	10	14	29	−15	6		0–3	2–2	1–1	2–2	2–3	2–0	0–1	

Source: CBF
Rules for classification: 1) points; 2) wins; 3) goal difference; 4) goals scored; 5) head-to-head results (only between 2 teams); 6) fewest red cards; 7) fewest yellow cards; 8) draw.

=== Group A5 ===
Pos	Team	Pld	W	D	L	GF	GA	GD	Pts	Qualification	APA	NOV	UNI	BRA	GOI	POR	GAM	JAR
1	(Goiás) Aparecidense	14	8	4	2	19	8	+11	28	Advance to round of 32		3–1	1–1	1–0	4–1	0–1	2–1	1–0
2	(Mato Grosso) Nova Mutum	14	8	3	3	18	11	+7	27	Advance to round of 32	1–0		1–0	1–0	2–0	1–1	1–1	2–0
3	(Mato Grosso) União Rondonópolis	14	7	3	4	21	15	+6	24	Advance to round of 32	0–2	0–1		2–1	0–1	1–1	2–1	2–1
4	(Federal District (Brazil)) Brasiliense	14	6	3	5	22	14	+8	21	Advance to round of 32	1–2	3–1	2–3		1–1	2–1	0–0	3–0
5	(Goiás) Goianésia	14	5	6	3	15	14	+1	21		0–0	1–0	3–3	1–1		1–1	2–1	0–1
6	(Rondônia) Porto Velho	14	2	7	5	10	16	−6	13		0–2	1–1	0–2	1–3	0–1		1–1	1–0
7	(Federal District (Brazil)) Gama	14	2	6	6	13	18	−5	12		0–0	0–3	0–3	0–1	0–0	1–1		4–1
8	(Goiás) Jaraguá	14	1	2	11	6	28	−22	5		1–1	1–2	0–2	0–4	0–3	0–0	1–3	

Source: CBF
Rules for classification: 1) points; 2) wins; 3) goal difference; 4) goals scored; 5) head-to-head results (only between 2 teams); 6) fewest red cards; 7) fewest yellow cards; 8) draw.

=== Group A6 ===
Pos	Team	Pld	W	D	L	GF	GA	GD	Pts	Qualification	FER	BOA	UBE	CAL	RVN	RIO	PAT	AGU
1	(São Paulo (state)) Ferroviária	14	10	3	1	24	5	+19	33	Advance to round of 32		2–0	0–3	3–1	1–0	2–0	1–0	7–0
2	(Minas Gerais) Boa Esporte	14	6	6	2	20	11	+9	24	Advance to round of 32	0–0		2–2	1–1	3–1	1–1	2–0	4–0
3	(Minas Gerais) Uberlândia	14	6	5	3	21	15	+6	23	Advance to round of 32	1–1	0–0		2–3	2–1	3–2	1–1	2–0
4	(Minas Gerais) Caldense	14	6	3	5	26	19	+7	21	Advance to round of 32	0–1	0–1	3–1		0–0	1–2	0–0	6–2
5	(Espírito Santo) Rio Branco de Venda Nova	14	5	6	3	18	13	+5	21		0–0	2–1	1–0	3–0		0–0	2–1	2–2
6	(Espírito Santo) Rio Branco-ES	14	4	3	7	17	22	−5	15		0–3	1–2	0–2	1–2	0–3		2–1	2–0
7	(Minas Gerais) Patrocinense	14	1	4	9	9	22	−13	7		0–2	1–3	0–1	2–3	1–1	0–0		1–0
8	(Mato Grosso do Sul) Águia Negra	14	1	4	9	13	41	−28	7		0–1	0–0	1–1	0–6	2–2	2–6	4–1	

Source: CBF
Rules for classification: 1) points; 2) wins; 3) goal difference; 4) goals scored; 5) head-to-head results (only between 2 teams); 6) fewest red cards; 7) fewest yellow cards; 8) draw.

=== Group A7 ===
Pos	Team	Pld	W	D	L	GF	GA	GD	Pts	Qualification	POR	SAN	CIA	BAN	INT	BOA	SAO	MAD
1	(São Paulo (state)) Portuguesa	14	6	6	2	20	12	+8	24	Advance to round of 32		1–0	2–2	1–1	0–1	3–0	2–0	2–0
2	(São Paulo (state)) Santo André	14	6	3	5	16	13	+3	21	Advance to round of 32	2–2		1–0	1–2	2–1	0–1	1–1	2–0
3	(Paraná (state)) Cianorte	14	4	8	2	12	9	+3	20	Advance to round of 32	0–0	1–1		2–0	0–0	2–1	1–0	0–0
4	(Rio de Janeiro (state)) Bangu	14	5	4	5	14	16	−2	19	Advance to round of 32	2–1	1–2	1–1		1–1	0–2	1–0	3–1
5	(São Paulo (state)) Inter de Limeira	14	5	4	5	11	14	−3	19		1–1	1–2	2–1	0–1		1–0	0–2	0–3
6	(Rio de Janeiro (state)) Boavista	14	5	3	6	11	13	−2	18		0–1	0–2	1–1	2–0	0–1		0–0	1–1
7	(São Paulo (state)) São Bento	14	3	5	6	10	13	−3	14		2–3	1–0	0–1	1–1	0–0	0–1		1–1
8	(Rio de Janeiro (state)) Madureira	14	3	5	6	12	16	−4	14		1–1	1–0	0–0	1–0	1–2	1–2	1–2	

Source: CBF
Rules for classification: 1) points; 2) wins; 3) goal difference; 4) goals scored; 5) head-to-head results (only between 2 teams); 6) fewest red cards; 7) fewest yellow cards; 8) draw.

=== Group A8 ===
Pos	Team	Pld	W	D	L	GF	GA	GD	Pts	Qualification	JOI	CAS	ESP	CAX	JUV	MAR	AIM	RIO
1	(Santa Catarina (state)) Joinville	14	7	7	0	17	6	+11	28	Advance to round of 32		3–1	0–0	2–0	1–0	1–1	1–0	3–0
2	(Paraná (state)) FC Cascavel	14	7	6	1	27	17	+10	27	Advance to round of 32	3–3		2–1	1–0	1–0	2–0	2–2	3–1
3	(Rio Grande do Sul) Esportivo	14	4	6	4	15	13	+2	18 (Note: Head-to-head points: Esportivo 4; Caxias 1)	Advance to round of 32	0–1	2–2		1–1	2–1	0–0	2–1	4–1
4	(Rio Grande do Sul) Caxias	14	4	6	4	15	13	+2	18	Advance to round of 32	0–0	1–1	0–1		1–1	2–0	2–1	5–1
5	(Santa Catarina (state)) Juventus	14	4	6	4	12	11	+1	18		0–1	1–1	1–0	1–1		2–0	1–0	0–0
6	(Santa Catarina (state)) Marcílio Dias	14	4	6	4	13	17	−4	18		1–1	1–1	2–1	0–0	1–1		3–2	2–0
7	(Rio Grande do Sul) Aimoré	14	3	3	8	15	18	−3	12		0–0	1–3	1–1	2–0	0–1	4–1		1–0
8	(Paraná (state)) Rio Branco-PR	14	1	4	9	8	27	−19	7		0–0	1–4	0–0	1–2	2–2	0–1	1–0	

Source: CBF
Rules for classification: 1) points; 2) wins; 3) goal difference; 4) goals scored; 5) head-to-head results (only between 2 teams); 6) fewest red cards; 7) fewest yellow cards; 8) draw.

== Final stages ==
The final stages were played on a home-and-away two-legged basis. For the round of 16, semi-finals and finals, the best-overall-performance team hosted the second leg. If tied on aggregate, the away goals rule would not be used, extra time would not be played, and the penalty shoot-out would be used to determine the winners (Regulations Article 18).

For the quarter-finals, teams were seeded based on the table of results of all matches in the competition. The top four seeded teams played the second leg at home.

The four quarter-finals winners were promoted to 2022 Série C.

=== Round of 32 ===
The round of 32 was a two-legged knockout tie, with the draw regionalised. The matches were played from 11 to 20 September.

==== Matches ====
Team 1	Agg.	Team 2	1st leg	2nd leg
Moto Club (Maranhão)	4–1	(Pará) Castanhal	2–0	2–1
Penarol (Amazonas (Brazilian state))	1–3	(Piauí) 4 de Julho	1–0	0–3
Galvez (Acre (state))	0–2	(Ceará) Guarany de Sobral	0–0	0–2
Paragominas (Pará)	3–1	(Roraima) São Raimundo	1–0	2–1
Retrô (Pernambuco)	3–4	(Rio Grande do Norte) ABC	1–1	2–3
América de Natal (Rio Grande do Norte)	3–1	(Sergipe) Itabaiana	1–1	2–0
Atlético Cearense (Ceará)	1–1 (5–3 p)	(Bahia) Juazeirense	1–1	0–0
Sergipe	3–3 (2–4 p)	(Paraíba) Campinense	2–2	1–1
Caldense (Minas Gerais)	2–3	(Goiás) Aparecidense	1–0	1–3
União Rondonópolis (Mato Grosso)	3–1	(Minas Gerais) Boa Esporte	2–0	1–1
Brasiliense (Federal District (Brazil))	0–1	(São Paulo (state)) Ferroviária	0–0	0–1
Uberlândia (Minas Gerais)	3–1	(Mato Grosso) Nova Mutum	1–1	2–0
Caxias (Rio Grande do Sul)	1–1 (4–1 p)	(São Paulo (state)) Portuguesa	1–0	0–1
Cianorte (Paraná (state))	3–0	(Paraná (state)) FC Cascavel	0–0	3–0
Bangu (Rio de Janeiro (state))	2–2 (3–4 p)	(Santa Catarina (state)) Joinville	1–1	1–1
Esportivo (Rio Grande do Sul)	1–1 (5–4 p)	(São Paulo (state)) Santo André	0–1	1–0

=== Round of 16 ===
The matches were played from 25 September to 3 October.

==== Matches ====
Team 1	Agg.	Team 2	1st leg	2nd leg
América de Natal (Rio Grande do Norte)	5–2	(Maranhão) Moto Club	1–0	4–2
4 de Julho (Piauí)	1–3	(Rio Grande do Norte) ABC	1–1	0–2
Campinense (Paraíba)	4–1	(Ceará) Guarany de Sobral	2–1	2–0
Atlético Cearense (Ceará)	3–2	(Pará) Paragominas	2–0	1–2
Cianorte (Paraná (state))	0–1	(Goiás) Aparecidense	0–0	0–1
Caxias (Rio Grande do Sul)	4–0	(Mato Grosso) União Rondonópolis	2–0	2–0
Esportivo (Rio Grande do Sul)	2–3	(São Paulo (state)) Ferroviária	1–2	1–1
Uberlândia (Minas Gerais)	2–2 (3–1 p)	(Santa Catarina (state)) Joinville	1–0	1–2

=== Quarter-finals ===
The draw for the quarter-finals was seeded based on the table of results of all matches in the competition (except preliminary stage matches) for the qualifying teams. The teams were ranked according to points. If tied on points, the following criteria would be used to determine the ranking: 1. Wins; 2. Goal difference; 3. Goals scored; 4. Fewest red cards; 5. Fewest yellow cards; 6. Draw in the headquarters of the Brazilian Football Confederation (Regulations Article 15).

==== Quarter-finals seedings ====
Seed	Team	Pts	W	GD
1	(São Paulo (state)) Ferroviária	41	12	+21
2	(Rio Grande do Norte) ABC	36	11	+20
3	(Goiás) Aparecidense	35	10	+13
4	(Paraíba) Campinense	33	9	+14
5	(Rio Grande do Norte) América de Natal	32	9	+10
6	(Minas Gerais) Uberlândia	30	8	+8
7	(Rio Grande do Sul) Caxias	27	7	+6
8	(Ceará) Atlético Cearense	26	7	+3

==== Matches ====
The matches were played from 9 to 17 October.

Team 1	Agg.	Team 2	1st leg	2nd leg
Atlético Cearense (Ceará)	1–1 (4–3 p)	(São Paulo (state)) Ferroviária	1–1	0–0
América de Natal (Rio Grande do Norte)	0–0 (2–4 p)	(Paraíba) Campinense	0–0	0–0
Caxias (Rio Grande do Sul)	0–3	(Rio Grande do Norte) ABC	0–0	0–3
Uberlândia (Minas Gerais)	1–2	(Goiás) Aparecidense	0–1	1–1

=== Semi-finals ===
The matches were played from 23 to 31 October.

==== Matches ====
Team 1	Agg.	Team 2	1st leg	2nd leg
Atlético Cearense (Ceará)	2–4	(Paraíba) Campinense	1–1	1–3
Aparecidense (Goiás)	4–3	(Rio Grande do Norte) ABC	4–2	0–1

=== Finals ===
The matches were played on 6 and 13 November.

==== Matches ====
Team 1	Agg.	Team 2	1st leg	2nd leg
Campinense (Paraíba)	1–2	(Goiás) Aparecidense	0–1	1–1

6 November 2021
16:00

Campinense (Paraíba)	0–1	(Goiás) Aparecidense
	Report	David 21'

Amigão, Campina Grande
Attendance: 3,243
Referee: Paulo Roberto Alves Júnior (Paraná)

13 November 2021
16:00

Aparecidense (Goiás)	1–1	(Paraíba) Campinense
Samuel 77'	Report	Dione 53'

Estádio Annibal Batista de Toledo, Aparecida de Goiânia
Attendance: 2,495
Referee: Raphael Claus (São Paulo)

== Top goalscorers ==
Rank	Player	Team	Goals
1	Gabriel Santos	(Minas Gerais) Caldense	13
2	Ingro	(Minas Gerais) Uberlândia	11
3	Pecel	(Pará) Castanhal	9
4	Igor Bahia	(Alagoas) Murici	8
4	Michel	(Rio Grande do Sul) Caxias	8
4	Olávio	(Ceará) Atlético Cearense	8
4	Raílson	(Amazonas (Brazilian state)) Penarol	8
4	Robinho	(Paraná (state)) FC Cascavel	8
4	Wallyson	(Rio Grande do Norte) ABC	8
10	Alvinho	(Rio Grande do Norte) América de Natal	7
10	Batista	(Rio Grande do Sul) Esportivo	7
10	Erick Pulga	(Ceará) Atlético Cearense	7
10	Gustavo Henrique	(Rio Grande do Norte) ABC	7
10	Heltinho	(Mato Grosso) União Rondonópolis	7
10	Jackie Chan	(Amazonas (Brazilian state)) Fast Clube	7
10	Léo Itaperuna	(Paraná (state)) FC Cascavel	7
10	Zé Eduardo	(Federal District (Brazil)) Brasiliense	7

Source: CBF
