= Rafael (footballer, born 2002) =

Brazilian footballer

Rafael Luiz
Personal information
- Full name: Rafael Luiz Santos Radwan da Costa
- Date of birth: 9 May 2002 (age 24)
- Place of birth: Rio de Janeiro, Brazil
- Height: 1.78 m (5 ft 10 in)
- Position: Defender

Team information
- Current team: Sampaio Corrêa (on loan from Ferroviária)
- Number: 32

Youth career
- –2020: Sport Recife

Senior career*
| Years | Team | Apps | (Gls) |
| 2020–2021 | Sport Recife | 5 | (0) |
| 2020 | → Cruzeiro (loan) | 13 | (0) |
| 2021– | Ferroviária | 22 | (0) |
| 2021 | → Red Bull Bragantino (loan) | 8 | (0) |
| 2023 | → São Paulo (loan) | 0 | (0) |
| 2023 | → Sampaio Corrêa (loan) | 0 | (0) |

International career^{‡}
| 2020– | Brazil U20 | 1 | (0) |
- * Club domestic league appearances and goals as of 13:42, 17 December 2021 (UTC) ‡ National team caps and goals as of 15 March 2021

Rafael Luiz Santos Radwan da Costa (born 9 May 2002), known as Rafael Luiz or just Rafael, is a Brazilian professional footballer who plays as a right-back for Sampaio Corrêa, on loan from Ferroviária.

== Career statistics ==
=== Club ===
As of 17 December 2021.

| Club | Season | League | | | State League | | Cup | | Continental | | Other | | Total | |
| Club | Season | Division | Apps | Goals | Apps | Goals | Apps | Goals | Apps | Goals | Apps | Goals | Apps | Goals |
|---|---|---|---|---|---|---|---|---|---|---|---|---|---|---|
| Sport Recife | 2020 | Série A | 2 | 0 | 3 (Note: Appearances in the Campeonato Pernambucano) | 0 | 0 | 0 | — | | 3 (Note: Appearances in the Copa do Nordeste) | 0 | 8 | 0 |
| Cruzeiro (loan) | 2020 | Série B | 13 | 0 | — | | — | | — | | — | | 13 | 0 |
| Ferroviária | 2021 | Série D | 0 | 0 | 0 | 0 | 0 | 0 | — | | — | | 0 | 0 |
| Red Bull Bragantino (loan) | 2021 | Série A | 4 | 0 | 4 (Note: Appearances in the Campeonato Paulista) | 0 | 0 | 0 | 0 | 0 | — | | 8 | 0 |
| Career total | | | 19 | 0 | 7 | 0 | 0 | 0 | 0 | 0 | 3 | 0 | 29 | 0 |
