= Rodrigo Longaray =

Brazilian footballer

Personal information
- Full name: Rodrigo de Oliveira Longaray
- Date of birth: 12 May 1985 (age 41)
- Place of birth: Porto Alegre, Brazil
- Height: 1.71 m (5 ft 7 in)
- Position: Midfielder

Team information
- Current team: Cerro Largo
- Number: 5

Youth career
- –1999: Grêmio
- 1999–2001: Internacional

Senior career*
Years	Team	Apps	(Gls)
2002–2003	Aimoré-RS		
2003–2004	Portuguesa		
2004–2005	Cruzeiro		
2005	Porto Alegre		
2006–2007	Ulbra Ji-Paraná		
2008	São Paulo-RS		
2008–2010	Aimoré-RS	52	(2)
2010–2013	Cerro Largo	76	(0)
2013–2016	Cerro	12	(0)
2016–2017	Cerro Largo	5	(0)
2017	Danubio	6	(0)
2017–	Cerro Largo		
- * Club domestic league appearances and goals as of 20 November 2017

Rodrigo de Oliveira Longaray (born 12 May 1985 in Porto Alegre) is a Brazilian footballer currently playing as a midfielder for Cerro Largo of the Uruguayan Primera División.
