= 2021 Copa Verde =

8th edition of a Brazilian association football competition

Tournament details
- Country: Brazil
- Dates: 3 October – 11 December
- Teams: 24

Final positions
- Champions: (Pará) Remo (1st title)
- Runners-up: (Goiás) Vila Nova

Tournament statistics
- Matches played: 30
- Goals scored: 75 (2.5 per match)
- Top goal scorer(s): (Brazil) Neto Pessoa (9 goals)

The 2021 Copa Verde was the eighth edition of the football competition held in Brazil. Featuring 24 clubs, Acre, Amazonas, Distrito Federal, Espírito Santo, Mato Grosso do Sul and Pará have two vacancies; Amapá, Goiás, Mato Grosso, Rondônia, Roraima and Tocantins with one each. The others six berths was set according to CBF ranking.

In the finals, Remo defeated Vila Nova 4–2 on penalties after tied 0–0 on aggregate to win their first title and a place in the third round of the 2022 Copa do Brasil.

== Qualified teams ==
Association	Team	Qualification method
(Acre (state)) Acre; 1+2 berths	Galvez	2020 Campeonato Acreano champions
(Acre (state)) Acre; 1+2 berths	Rio Branco	5th best placed team in the 2021 CBF ranking not already qualified
(Acre (state)) Acre; 1+2 berths	Atlético Acreano	3rd best placed team in the 2021 CBF ranking not already qualified
(Amapá) Amapá; 1 berth	Ypiranga	2020 Campeonato Amapaense champions
(Amazonas (Brazilian state)) Amazonas; 2+1 berths	Penarol	2020 Campeonato Amazonense champions
(Amazonas (Brazilian state)) Amazonas; 2+1 berths	Fast Clube	2020 Campeonato Amazonense 3rd place
(Amazonas (Brazilian state)) Amazonas; 2+1 berths	Manaus	4th best placed team in the 2021 CBF ranking not already qualified
(Federal District (Brazil)) Distrito Federal; 2 berths	Gama	2020 Campeonato Brasiliense champions
(Federal District (Brazil)) Distrito Federal; 2 berths	Brasiliense	2020 Campeonato Brasiliense runners-up
(Espírito Santo) Espírito Santo; 2 berths	Rio Branco de Venda Nova	2020 Campeonato Capixaba champions
(Espírito Santo) Espírito Santo; 2 berths	Rio Branco	2020 Campeonato Capixaba runners-up
(Goiás) Goiás; 1 berth	Vila Nova	2020 Campeonato Goiano 7th place
(Mato Grosso) Mato Grosso; 1+2 berths	Nova Mutum	2020 Campeonato Mato-Grossense champions
(Mato Grosso) Mato Grosso; 1+2 berths	Cuiabá	1st best placed team in the 2021 CBF ranking not already qualified
(Mato Grosso) Mato Grosso; 1+2 berths	Sinop	6th best placed team in the 2021 CBF ranking not already qualified
(Mato Grosso do Sul) Mato Grosso do Sul; 2 berths	Águia Negra	2020 Campeonato Sul-Mato-Grossense champions
(Mato Grosso do Sul) Mato Grosso do Sul; 2 berths	Aquidauanense	2020 Campeonato Sul-Mato-Grossense runners-up
(Pará) Pará; 2+1 berths	Paysandu	2020 Campeonato Paraense champions
(Pará) Pará; 2+1 berths	Castanhal	2020 Campeonato Paraense 3rd place
(Pará) Pará; 2+1 berths	Remo	2nd best placed team in the 2021 CBF ranking not already qualified
(Rondônia) Rondônia; 2 berths	Porto Velho	2020 Campeonato Rondoniense champions
(Rondônia) Rondônia; 2 berths	Real Ariquemes	2020 Campeonato Rondoniense runners-up
(Roraima) Roraima; 1 berth	São Raimundo	2020 Campeonato Roraimense champions
(Tocantins) Tocantins; 1 berth	Interporto	2020 Campeonato Tocantinense 3rd place

== Schedule ==
The schedule of the competition is as follows.

Stage	First leg	Second leg
First round	13 and 14 October 2021	
Round of 16	19, 20 and 21 October 2021	
Quarter-finals	27 and 28 October and 12 November 2021	3, 4, 10 and 24 November 2021
Semi-finals	24 November and 1 December 2021	2 and 4 December 2021
Finals	8 December 2021	11 December 2021

== Bracket ==
First round
(Federal District (Brazil)) Gama	0
(Mato Grosso do Sul) Aquidauanense	1
(Tocantins) Interporto	0
(Espírito Santo) Rio Branco de Venda Nova	1
(Federal District (Brazil)) Brasiliense (p)	0 (5)
(Espírito Santo) Rio Branco	0 (3)
(Mato Grosso do Sul) Águia Negra	1
(Mato Grosso) Nova Mutum	3
(Rondônia) Real Ariquemes	0
(Amazonas (Brazilian state)) Penarol	2
(Amazonas (Brazilian state)) Fast Clube	0
(Pará) Castanhal	2
(Mato Grosso) Sinop	0
(Rondônia) Porto Velho	1
(Acre (state)) Galvez (p)	1 (4)
(Amapá) Ypiranga	1 (1)

Round of 16
(Acre (state)) Atlético Acreano	1 (4)
(Mato Grosso do Sul) Aquidauanense (p)	1 (5)
(Goiás) Vila Nova	3
(Espírito Santo) Rio Branco de Venda Nova	0
(Mato Grosso) Cuiabá	0 (6)
(Federal District (Brazil)) Brasiliense (p)	0 (7)
(Acre (state)) Rio Branco	1
(Mato Grosso) Nova Mutum	4
(Pará) Paysandu	6
(Amazonas (Brazilian state)) Penarol	0
(Roraima) São Raimundo	1
(Pará) Castanhal	2
(Amazonas (Brazilian state)) Manaus	2
(Rondônia) Porto Velho	0
(Pará) Remo	9
(Acre (state)) Galvez	0

Quarter-finals
(Mato Grosso do Sul) Aquidauanense	0	0	0
(Goiás) Vila Nova	1	7	8
(Federal District (Brazil)) Brasiliense	1	0	1 (2)
(Mato Grosso) Nova Mutum (p)	0	1	1 (3)
(Pará) Paysandu	1	3	4
(Pará) Castanhal	1	1	2
(Amazonas (Brazilian state)) Manaus	1	0	1
(Pará) Remo	1	3	4

Semi-finals
(Goiás) Vila Nova	3	1	4
(Mato Grosso) Nova Mutum	0	1	1
(Pará) Paysandu	2	0	2
(Pará) Remo	2	2	4

Finals
(Goiás) Vila Nova	0	0	0 (2)
(Pará) Remo (p)	0	0	0 (4)

== Finals ==
8 December 2021
20:00 BRT (UTC−3)

Vila Nova (Goiás)	0–0	(Pará) Remo
	Report

Estádio Onésio Brasileiro Alvarenga, Goiânia
Attendance: 8,120
Referee: Rodrigo Batista Raposo

11 December 2021
17:00 BRT (UTC−3)

Remo (Pará)	0–0	(Goiás) Vila Nova
	Report
Penalties
Neto Pessoa (penalty scored); Raimar (penalty scored); Marlon (penalty scored); Fredson (penalty scored)	4–2	(penalty scored) Clayton; (penalty scored) Rafael Donato; (penalty missed) André Krobel; (penalty missed) Johnatan Cardoso

Baenão, Belém
Attendance: 12,702
Referee: Dyorgines José Padovani de Andrade

Tied 0–0 on aggregate, Remo won on penalties.
