= Grêmio Recreativo e Esportivo =

Football club in Espigão d'Oeste, Brazil

Grêmio Recreativo
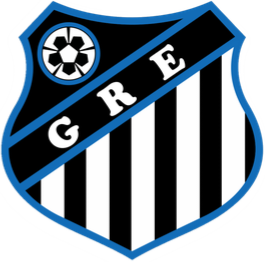
- Full name: Grêmio Recreativo e Esportivo
- Nickname(s): Caçulinha de Rondônia
- Founded: 1 May 1984; 40 years ago
- Ground: Luizinho Turatti
- Capacity: 2,000
- 2000: Rondoniense, 10th of 11
Home colours	Away colours

Grêmio Recreativo e Esportivo, commonly referred to as Grêmio Recreativo (Brazilian Portuguese: [ˈɡɾẽmiu ʁekɾeaˈtʃivu]), is a currently inactive Brazilian football club based in Espigão d'Oeste, Rondônia.

== History ==
The club was founded on 1 May 1984. Espigão finished in the second place in the Campeonato Rondoniense in 1992, losing the competition to Ji-Paraná, and finished in the second place in the Campeonato Rondoniense Second Level in 2005, losing the competition to Ulbra Ji-Paraná.

== Stadium ==
Grêmio Recreativo play their home games at Estádio Municipal Luizinho Turatti, nicknamed Espigão. The stadium has a maximum capacity of 2,000 people.
