= Ajax Futebol Clube =

Ajax-RO
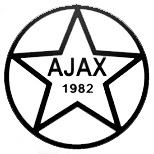
- Full name: Ajax Futebol Clube
- Founded: 3 February 1982; 43 years ago
- Ground: Portal da Amazônia
- Capacity: 2,500
Home colours	Away colours

Ajax Futebol Clube, commonly referred to as Ajax de Rondônia, or simply Ajax-RO, was a Brazilian professional football club based in Vilhena, Rondônia. Founded in 1982, it last competed in the 2001 Campeonato Rondoniense before folding in 2008 due to continuing financial constraints.

== History ==
The club was founded on 3 February 1982.

== Stadium ==
Ajax Futebol Clube played their home games at Estádio Portal da Amazônia. The stadium has a maximum capacity of 7,000 people.
