= Ariquemes Airport =

Ariquemes Airport Aeroporto de Ariquemes
- IATA: AQM; ICAO: SJOG; LID: RO0008

Summary
- Airport type: Public
- Operator: Infraero (2024–present)
- Serves: Ariquemes
- Time zone: BRT−1 (UTC−04:00)
- Elevation AMSL: 142 m (466 ft)
- Coordinates: 09°52′50″S 063°02′50″W
- Website: www4.infraero.gov.br/aeroporto-de-ariquemes/

Map
- Location in Brazil AQM (Brazil)

Runways
Direction	Length		Surface
Direction	m	ft	Surface
03/21	1,306	4,285	Asphalt

Statistics (2025)
- Passengers: 1,079
- Aircraft Operations: 496
- Metric tonnes of cargo: 0
- Statistics: Infraero; Sources: Airport Website, ANAC, DECEA

Ariquemes Airport (IATA: AQM, ICAO: SJOG) is the airport serving Ariquemes, Brazil.

It is operated by Infraero.

== History ==
On April 1, 2024 the airport started being operated by Infraero.

== Access ==
The airport is located 4 km (2 mi) from downtown Ariquemes.

== See also ==
- List of airports in Brazil
