= 2007 Copa do Brasil =

Copa do Brasil 2007

Tournament details
- Country: Brazil
- Dates: February 14 - June 6
- Teams: 64

Final positions
- Champions: Fluminense (RJ)
- Runners-up: Figueirense (SC)

Tournament statistics
- Matches played: 115
- Goals scored: 327 (2.84 per match)

The Copa do Brasil 2007 is the 19th staging of the Copa do Brasil.

The competition started on February 14, 2007 and concluded on June 6, 2007 with the second leg of the final, held at the Estádio Orlando Scarpelli in Florianópolis, in which Fluminense lifted the trophy for the first time with a 1-0 victory over Figueirense.

== Knockout round ==
First Round
Palmeiras-SP	5
Operário (VG)-MT	0
Ipatinga-MG	0	3
Vitória-ES	1	1
Sport-PE	1	3
Campinense-PB	1	0
São Raimundo-AM	0	1
Ananindeua-PA	2	0
Cruzeiro-MG	0	1
Veranópolis-RS	0	0
Portuguesa-SP	2
Chapadão-MS	0
Juventude-RS (a)	1	2
Ferroviária-SP	3	0
Brasiliense-DF	4
Barra do Garças-MT	1

Second Round
Palmeiras-SP	0	2 (3)
Ipatinga-MG (p)	2	0 (4)
Sport-PE	5
Ananindeua-PA	0
Cruzeiro-MG	0	2
Portuguesa-SP	0	1
Juventude-RS	0	2
Brasiliense-DF	0	3

Round of 16
Ipatinga-MG (p)	1	1 (4)
Sport-PE	1	1 (2)
Cruzeiro-MG	0	1
Brasiliense-DF	1	1

Quarterfinals
Ipatinga-MG
Brasiliense-DF

First Round
Atlético-PR	5
Coxim-MS	2
Vitória-BA	1	1 (3)
Baraúnas-RN*	1	1 (5)
Guarani-SP	1	0
Atlético-GO	2	0
Fortaleza-CE	3
Sampaio Corrêa-MA	1
Fluminense-RJ	2	6
ADESG-AC	1	0
América-RN	0	2
Baré-RR	1	0
Goiás-GO	3
Moto Club-MA	1
Bahia-BA (a)	2	0
Itabaiana-SE	1	1

Second Round
Atlético-PR (a)	1	3
Vitória-BA	4	0
Atlético-GO (p)	2	3 (5)
Fortaleza-CE	3	2 (3)
Fluminense-RJ (a)	2	0
América-RN	1	1
Goiás-GO	1	3
Bahia-BA (a)	1	3

Round of 16
Atlético-PR (a)	1	2
Atlético-GO	3	0
Fluminense-RJ (a)	1	2
Bahia-BA	1	2

Quarterfinals
Atlético-PR
Fluminense-RJ

First Round
Corinthians-SP	1	3
Pirambu-SE	1	0
Treze-PB	0	3
Vilavelhense-ES	1	1
Náutico-PE	2	6
Parnahyba-PI	1	0
Paysandu-PA	1	2
São José-AP	0	2
Vasco da Gama-RJ	2	6
Fast Clube-AM	1	0
Gama-DF	3
Araguaína-TO	1
Figueirense-SC	3	2
Madureira-RJ	2	0
Noroeste-SP	4
Adap Galo Maringá-PR	1

Second Round
Corinthians-SP	2
Treze-PB	0
Náutico-PE	0	5
Paysandu-PA	1	0
Vasco da Gama-RJ	2	1
Gama-DF	2	2
Figueirense-SC	0	4
Noroeste-SP	0	1

Round of 16
Corinthians-SP	2	0
Náutico-PE	2	2
Gama-DF	2	1
Figueirense-SC	4	2

Quarterfinals
Náutico-PE
Figueirense-SC

First Round
Atlético-MG	3
Colo-Colo-BA	1
América-RJ	1	3
Coruripe-AL	1	1
Ponte Preta-SP	0	2
Villa Nova-MG	1	3
Avaí-SC	1	0
Rio Branco-PR*	1	1
Botafogo-RJ	1	5
CSA-AL	1	2
Ceará-CE	0	2
Barras-PI	1	0
Coritiba-PR	1	4
Caxias-RS	2	1
Santa Cruz-PE	0	1
Ulbra Ji-Paraná-RO	2	2

Second Round
Atlético-MG	1	2
América-RJ	1	1
Villa Nova-MG	0	2
Avaí-SC	0	3
Botafogo-RJ	0	2
Ceará-CE	0	1
Coritiba-PR	2	1
Ulbra Ji-Paraná-RO	2	0

Round of 16
Atlético-MG (p)	2	1
Avaí-SC	0	0
Botafogo-RJ	1	3
Coritiba-PR	0	3

Quarterfinals
Atlético-MG
Botafogo-RJ

== Final phase ==
Semi-finals
1	Brasiliense-DF	2	1	3
4	Fluminense-RJ	4	1	5
3	Figueirense-SC (a)	2	1	3
2	Botafogo-RJ	0	3	3

Finals
Fluminense-RJ	1	1	2
Figueirense-SC	1	2	3

== Champion ==
Copa do Brasil 2007:

Fluminense-RJ
First Title
