= Sport Club Ulbra Ji-Paraná =

Ulbra Ji-Paraná
- Full name: Sport Club Ulbra Ji-Paraná
- Nickname(s): Coruja
- Founded: April 1, 2005
- Dissolved: September 2008
- Ground: Biancão, Ji-Paraná, Brazil
- Capacity: 4,400
Home colours	Away colours

Sport Club Ulbra Ji-Paraná, or Ulbra Ji-Paraná as they are usually called, were a Brazilian football team from Ji-Paraná in Rondônia state, founded on April 1, 2005. Their home stadium was the Biancão, which has a maximum capacity of 4,400 people. They played in red and white colors. Ulbra Ji-Paraná competed in the Série C and in the Copa do Brasil.

== History ==
Sport Club Ulbra Ji-Paraná were founded by the Centro Universitário Luterano of Ji-Paraná on April 1, 2005. The club won their first achievement, which was the Campeonato Rondoniense Second Level in the same year, beating Grêmio of Espigão d'Oeste in the final.

The club won the Campeonato Rondoniense in 2006, 2007 and 2008. They beat Vilhena in the 2006 final, Jaruense in 2007, and Vilhena again in 2008.

Ulbra Ji-Paraná competed in the Série C in 2006, finishing in the last place in their group. The club qualified for the 2008 edition, but withdrew. They competed in the Copa do Brasil for the first time in 2007, when they defeated Santa Cruz in the first round, but were eliminated by Coritiba in the second round. Ulbra Ji-Paraná were eliminated in the first round in 2008, by Portuguesa.

The club folded in September 2008, a few months after winning that season's Campeonato Rondoniense, due to failure to find sponsorship. Instead of investing in the club, the college invested in new courses and in improving their campus.

== Achievements ==
- Campeonato Rondoniense:
  - Winners (3): 2006, 2007, 2008
- Campeonato Rondoniense Second Level:
  - Winners (1): 2005

== Stadium ==
Ulbra Ji-Paraná played their home games at Estádio Municipal José de Abreu Bianco, commonly known as Biancão, located in Ji-Paraná. The stadium has a maximum capacity of 4,400 people, and was inaugurated on June 23, 2002.
