= Esporte Clube Espigão =

Football club in Espigão d'Oeste, Brazil

Espigão
- Full name: Esporte Clube Espigão
- Nickname(s): Caçulinha de Rondônia
- Founded: 7 June 2008; 16 years ago
- Ground: Luizinho Turatti
- Capacity: 2,000
- President: Josenei Perini
- 2013: Rondoniense, 6th of 7
Home colours	Away colours

Esporte Clube Espigão, commonly referred to as Espigão (Brazilian Portuguese: [espiˈɡɐ͂w]), is a Brazilian football club based in Espigão d'Oeste, Rondônia. It is solely running as a youth team for the current season.

They won the Campeonato Rondoniense once.

== History ==
The club was founded on June 7, 2008. Espigão won the Campeonato Rondoniense Second Level in 2008. They won the Campeonato Rondoniense in 2011, after beating Ariquemes in the final.

== Honours ==
=== State ===
- Campeonato Rondoniense
  - Winners (1): 2011
- Campeonato Rondoniense Second Division
  - Winners (1): 2008

=== Women's Football ===
- Campeonato Rondoniense de Futebol Feminino
  - Winners (1): 2013

== Stadium ==
Esporte Clube Espigão play their home games at Estádio Municipal Luizinho Turatti, nicknamed Espigão. The stadium has a maximum capacity of 2,000 people.
