= Vilhena Airport =

Airport serving Vilhena, Brazil

Brigadeiro Camarão Airport Aeroporto Brigadeiro Camarão

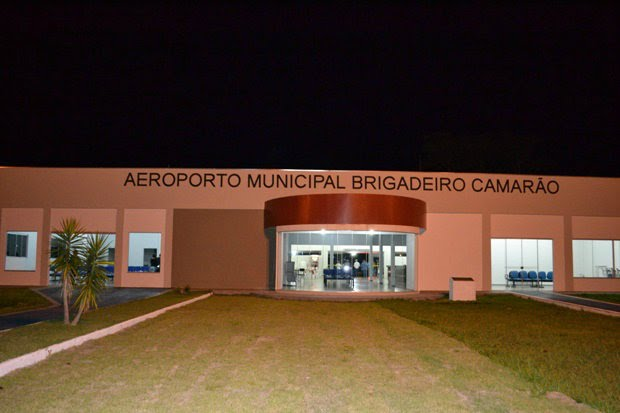
- IATA: BVH; ICAO: SBVH; LID: RO0003

Summary
- Airport type: Public
- Operator: GRU Airport
- Serves: Vilhena
- Time zone: BRT−1 (UTC−04:00)
- Elevation AMSL: 615 m (2,018 ft)
- Coordinates: 12°41′40″S 060°05′54″W

Map
- Location in Brazil BVH (Brazil)

Runways
Direction	Length		Surface
Direction	m	ft	Surface
03/21	2,600	8,530	Asphalt
- Sources: ANAC, DECEA

Brigadeiro Camarão Airport (IATA: BVH, ICAO: SBVH) is the airport serving Vilhena, Brazil.

It is managed by GRU Airport.

== History ==
On November 27, 2025 GRU Airport won the concession to operate the airport.

== Airlines and destinations ==
Airlines	Destinations
Azul Brazilian Airlines	Campinas, Cuiabá

== Access ==
The airport is located 8 km (5 mi) from downtown Vilhena.

== See also ==
- List of airports in Brazil
