= Copa Rondônia =

- Organising body: Federação de Futebol do Estado de Rondônia
- Founded: 2001
- Region: Rondônia, Brazil
- Number of teams: 8
- Qualifier for: Campeonato Brasileiro Série C
- Related competitions: Campeonato Rondoniense
- Most successful club(s): Ji-Paraná (1 title)

The Copa Rondônia (English: Rondônia State Cup) is a tournament organized by Federação de Futebol do Estado de Rondônia in 2001 to decide who would be the representative of the state at 2002 Campeonato Brasileiro Série C.

== List of champions ==
Season	Champions	Runners-up
2001	Ji-Paraná	CFA
