= Guaporé Futebol Clube =

Brazilian association football club based in Rolim de Moura, Rondônia, Brazil

Guaporé
- Full name: Guaporé Futebol Clube
- Founded: 21 April 2014; 12 years ago
- Ground: Cassolão
- Capacity: 7,300
- League: Campeonato Brasileiro Série D Campeonato Rondoniense
- 2025: Rondoniense, 2nd of 7
- Website: https://guaporefc.com.br/
Home colors	Away colors

Guaporé Futebol Clube, commonly referred to as Guaporé, is a Brazilian professional club based in Rolim de Moura, Rondônia founded on 21 April 2014. It competes in the Campeonato Rondoniense, the top flight of the Rondônia state football league.

== History ==
Guaporé was founded in 2014, but it became professional in 2019 when the club competed in the Campeonato Rondoniense for the first time. In 2024, it won the state second division.

== Stadium ==
It plays its matches at Cassolão. The stadium has a capacity of 7,300 people.

== Honours ==
State
Competitions	Titles	Seasons
Campeonato Rondoniense	1	2026
Campeonato Rondoniense Second Division	1	2024

=== Runners-up ===
- Campeonato Rondoniense (1): 2025
