= Jackie Chan (footballer) =

Brazilian footballer

Personal information
- Full name: Ivanilson Barbosa Chaul
- Date of birth: 11 July 1996 (age 30)
- Place of birth: Boa Vista, Brazil
- Height: 1.65 m (5 ft 5 in)
- Position: Forward

Senior career*
Years	Team	Apps	(Gls)
2014	Penarol-AM		
2014	Tarumã		
2015	Penarol-AM		
2015–2016	Fast Clube		
2016–2018	Nacional-AM		
2019–2020	Amazonas		
2020–2022	Manaus		
2021	→ Fast Clube (loan)		
2022	→ Inter de Limeira (loan)		
2023	Manauara		
2023	→ Nação-SC (loan)		
2024	Jataiense		
2024	Mixto		
2025	São Francisco-PA		
2025	Bragantino-PA		
2025	Fast Clube		
- * Club domestic league appearances and goals as of 19 October 2025

Ivanilson Barbosa Chaul (born 11 July 1996), better known by the nickname Jackie Chan, is a Brazilian professional footballer who plays as a forward.

== Career ==
Playing in futsal competitions for São José EC in Barcelos, Amazonas. Jackie Chan turned professional in 2014 with Penarol AC. There, he received the nickname Jackie Chan (in reference to the Chinese actor), from his first coach, Joselito. In his career he played for several clubs in Amazonas, being state champion in 2016 with Fast Clube, and in 2021 and 2022 with Manaus FC, a club where he gained national prominence. In 2022, his unusual nickname had repercussions after the match against São Paulo FC, in the 2022 Copa do Brasil.

He played on loan at Inter de Limeira, and in 2023, he signed with Manauara EC, where he was runner-up in the state. He was loaned in the second half of season to Nação Esportes and participated in the Santa Catarina Series B champion squad. In April 2024, he was announced as reinforcement for Mixto EC.

For the 2025 season, Jackie Chan signed with São Francisco FC from Santarém, Pará. He later played for Bragantino-PA and Fast Clube.

== Honours ==
Fast Clube

- Campeonato Amazonense: 2016

Manaus

- Campeonato Amazonense: 2021, 2022

Nação

- Campeonato Catarinense Série B: 2023
