= Ariquemes Futebol Clube =

Ariquemes
- Full name: Ariquemes Futebol Clube
- Nickname(s): Auriverde do Vale do Jamari
- Founded: 23 October 1996; 28 years ago
- Dissolved: 2020; 5 years ago
- Ground: Valerião
- Capacity: 2,500
- President: Laury Valentin Pereira
- 2017: Rondoniense, 5th of 8
Home colours	Away colours

Ariquemes Futebol Clube, commonly referred to as Ariquemes, was (Note: As of 2020, the club's CNPJ is listed as inapt.) a Brazilian football club based in Ariquemes, Rondônia. Their activities are currently closed due to financial difficulties. Ariquemes has last played in a professional match in June 2017.

== History ==
The club was founded on 2 October 1981. Ariquemes won the Campeonato Rondoniense Second Division in 2007, beating Cruzeiro-RO 6–1 in the final game of the league, played on 12 October at Estádio Aluízio Ferreira. Ariquemes was runner-up in the 2010 edition of the Campeonato Rondoniense, when they were defeated in the final by Vilhena.

== Honours ==
- Campeonato Rondoniense
  - Runners-up (3): 2010, 2011, 2014
- Campeonato Rondoniense Second Division
  - Winners (1): 2007

== Stadium ==
Ariquemes Futebol Clube play their home games at Estádio Gentil Valério, nicknamed Valerião. The stadium has a maximum capacity of 5,000 people.
