= Rolim de Moura Esporte Clube =

Brazilian football club

Rolim de Moura
- Full name: Rolim de Moura Esporte Clube
- Nickname(s): Tigre da Zona da Mata
- Founded: 4 November 2002; 22 years ago
- Ground: Cassolão
- Capacity: 10,000
Home colours	Away colours

Rolim de Moura Esporte Clube, commonly known as Rolim de Moura, is a Brazilian football club based in Rolim de Moura, Rondônia state.

== History ==
The club was founded on 1 November 2002. They finished in the second position in the Campeonato Rondoniense Second Level in 2007.

== Stadium ==
Rolim de Moura Esporte Clube played their home games at Estádio José Ângelo Cassol, nicknamed Cassolão. The stadium has a maximum capacity of 5,000 people.

== Honours ==
=== Women's Football ===
- Campeonato Rondoniense de Futebol Feminino
  - Winners (1): 2024
