= Vilhenense Esportivo Clube =

Football club in Vilhena, Brazil

Vilhenense
- Full name: Vilhenense Esportivo Clube
- Nickname(s): Leão do Norte; Leão de Vilhena; Leão de Rondônia
- Founded: 10 October 2017
- Dissolved: 25 October 2023; 17 months ago
- Ground: Portal da Amazônia
- Capacity: 2,500
- Chairman: Waldir Kurtz
- Manager: Felipe Romário
- League: Campeonato Rondoniense Série A
- 2022: Rondoniense Série B, 1st of 3 (champions)
Home colours	Away colours	Third colours

Vilhenense Esportivo Clube, commonly referred to as Vilhenense (Brazilian Portuguese: [viʎeˈnẽjsi]), was a Brazilian football club based in Vilhena, Rondônia. The club competed in the Campeonato Rondoniense Série A, in the Rondônia state football league system.

As of 2022, Vilhenense is the third-best ranked team from Rondônia in CBF's national club ranking, being placed 151st overall.

== History ==
In October 2017, Vilhenense was founded by businessman Valdir Kurtz, with the intention of playing in the ensuing Campeonato Rondoniense. The club made their debut in the 2018 Rondoniense, finishing first in the first round but ending fourth overall; it also qualified for the 2019 Copa Verde, but refused to play in the competition.

In the 2019 Rondoniense, Vilhenense lifted the trophy after a 2–1 aggregate win over Ji-Paraná.

On 25 October 2023, the owner of club Waldir Kurtz, announced the definitive closure of the club's activity.

== Honours ==
- Campeonato Rondoniense
  - Winners (1): 2019
- Campeonato Rondoniense Second Division
  - Winners (1): 2022
