= Porto Velho Esporte Clube =

Football club in Porto Velho, Brazil

Porto Velho
- Full name: Gazin Porto Velho Esporte Clube
- Nicknames: Locomotiva (Locomotive); Locomotiva do Norte (Locomotive of the North)
- Founded: 23 April 2018; 8 years ago
- Ground: Aluízio Ferreira
- Capacity: 5,000
- President: Jedson Lobo
- Head coach: Paulo Eduardo
- League: Campeonato Brasileiro Série D Campeonato Rondoniense
- 2025 2025: Série D, 63rd of 64; Rondoniense, 1st of 7 (champions)
Home colours	Away colours	Third colours

Porto Velho Esporte Clube, commonly referred to as Porto Velho (Brazilian Portuguese: [ˈpoʁtu ˈvɛʎu]), officially named Gazin Porto Velho Esporte Clube due to sponsorship reasons, is a Brazilian football club based in Porto Velho, Rondônia. The club competes in the Campeonato Rondoniense Série A, the top division in the Rondônia state football league system, and the Campeonato Brasileiro Série D.

As of 2022, Porto Velho is the second-best ranked team from Rondônia in CBF's national club ranking, being placed 131st overall.

== History ==
Logo used until 2025

Originally founded on 28 September 2014 under the name of 14 Bis, the club became a professional side on 23 April 2018, now called Porto Velho EC, and subsequently affiliated to the Federação Rondoniense de Futebol.

Their first professional tournament was the 2019 Campeonato Rondoniense, which the club reached the semifinals. In the following year, they won the Rondoniense and qualified to the 2021 Campeonato Brasileiro Série D, 2021 Copa Verde and the 2021 Copa do Brasil.

== Honours ==
=== State ===
- Campeonato Rondoniense
  - Winners (5): 2020, 2021, 2023, 2024, 2025

=== Women's Football ===
- Campeonato Rondoniense de Futebol Feminino
  - Winners (2): 2018, 2023
