= Barcelona Futebol Clube (RO) =

Football club in Vilhena, Brazil

Barcelona-RO
- Full name: Barcelona Futebol Clube
- Nicknames: Catalão Rondoniense; Índio do Norte; Barça da Rondônia; Barça dos índios
- Founded: 7 October 2016; 9 years ago
- Ground: Portal da Amazônia
- Capacity: 2,500
- Chairman: José Luís Pereira de Jesus
- League: Campeonato Rondoniense
- 2025: Rondoniense, 4th of 7
Home colours	Away colours	Third colours

Barcelona Futebol Clube, commonly referred to as Barcelona-RO (Brazilian Portuguese: [baʁseˈlõna dʒi ʁõwˈdõnia]), or simply Barcelona, is a Brazilian football club based in Porto Velho, Rondônia.

As of 2022, Barcelona is the fourth-best ranked team from Rondônia in CBF's national club ranking, being placed 157th overall.

== History ==
Initially a club from Vitória da União, Corumbiara, Barcelona started playing in amateur competitions in 1995. In 2012, the club moved to Vilhena, and turned professional on 7 October 2016.

Barcelona played its first professional competition (Campeonato Rondoniense) in 2017, and finished second after losing the finals to Real Ariquemes; the club also qualified to the following year's Campeonato Brasileiro Série D.

== Honours ==
- Campeonato Rondoniense
  - Runners-up (3): 2017, 2018, 2024
