= Vilhena Esporte Club =

Brazilian association football club based in Vilhena, Rondônia, Brazil

Vilhena
- Full name: Vilhena Esporte Club
- Nickname: Lobo do Cerrado (Cerrado's Wolf)
- Founded: 3 June 1991; 34 years ago
- Ground: Estádio Portal da Amazônia
- Capacity: 7,000
- President: Cleverson Machado
- Head coach: Maurício Carneiro
- League: Campeonato Rondoniense Segunda Divisão
- 2025: Rondoniense, 7th of 7
Home colors	Away colors

Vilhena Esporte Club, commonly referred to as Vilhena, is a Brazilian professional club based in Vilhena, Rondônia founded on 3 June 1991. It competes in the Campeonato Rondoniense, the top flight of the Rondônia state football league.

== History ==
The club was founded on 7 September 1974. Vilhena won the Campeonato Rondoniense in 2005, in 2009, in 2010 and in 2013. The club competed in the Série D in 2010, when they were eliminated in the First Stage. Vilhena, after winning the state championship for the fifth time, qualified to compete in the 2013 Série D, but they decided to not compete in league.

== Stadium ==
Vilhena Esporte Clube played their home games at Estádio Portal da Amazônia. The stadium has a maximum capacity of 7,000 people.

== Honours ==
- Campeonato Rondoniense
  - Winners (5): 2005, 2009, 2010, 2013, 2014
  - Runners-up (3): 2006, 2008, 2015
- Campeonato Rondoniense Second Division
  - Winners (1): 2023
