= Clube Atlético Pimentense =

Football club in Pimenta Bueno, Brazil

Pimentense
- Full name: Clube Atlético Pimentense
- Nickname(s): Rubro-Negro da BR
- Founded: 8 March 1987; 38 years ago
- Ground: Cassolão
- Capacity: 4,000
- League: Campeonato Rondoniense Série A
- 2022: Rondoniense, 6th of 6
Home colours	Away colours

Clube Atlético Pimentense, commonly referred to as Pimentense (Brazilian Portuguese: [pimẽjˈtẽjsi]), is a Brazilian football club based in Pimenta Bueno, Rondônia. The club competes in the Campeonato Rondoniense Série A, the top division in the Rondônia state football league system.

== History ==
The club was founded on 8 March 1987.

== Stadium ==
Clube Atlético Pimentense play their home games at Estádio Luiz Alves Athaíde. The stadium has a maximum capacity of 3,000 people.
