= Sociedade Esportiva União Cacoalense =

Football club in Rondônia, Brazil

União Cacoalense
- Full name: Sociedade Esportiva União Cacoalense
- Nickname: Raposa da BR
- Founded: 1 January 1982; 43 years ago
- Ground: Aglair Tonelli
- Capacity: 4,000
- President: Carlos Rodrigues
- 2024: Rondoniense, 4th of 6
Home colors	Away colors

Sociedade Esportiva União Cacoalense, commonly referred to as União Cacoalense (Brazilian Portuguese: [uniˈɐ͂w kakuaˈlẽjsi]), is a Brazilian football club based in Cacoal, Rondônia. The club competes in the Campeonato Rondoniense Série A, the top division in the Rondônia state football league system.

They have won the Campeonato Rondoniense twice.

== History ==
The club was founded on 1 January 1982. União Cacoalense won the Campeonato Rondoniense in 2003 and in 2004.

== Honours ==
- Campeonato Rondoniense
  - Winners (2): 2003, 2004
  - Runners-up (3): 2001, 2002, 2022
- Campeonato Rondoniense Second Division
  - Winners (2): 2013, 2025

== Stadium ==
Sociedade Esportiva União Cacoalense play their home games at Estádio Aglair Tonelli Nogueira. The stadium has a maximum capacity of 5,000 people.
