= Real Ariquemes Esporte Clube =

Football club in Ariquemes, Brazil

Real Ariquemes
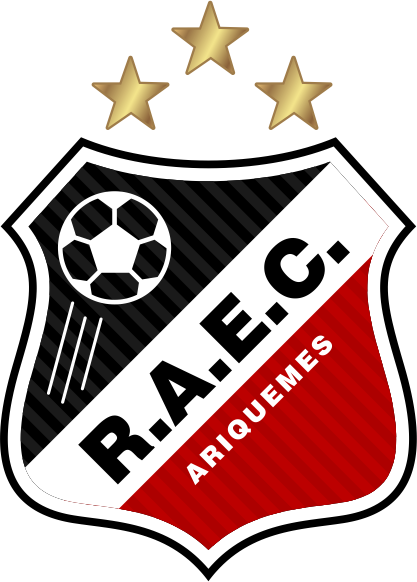
- Full name: Real Ariquemes Esporte Clube
- Nickname: Furacão do Vale do Jamari (Hurricane of the Jamari Valley)
- Founded: 25 April 2011; 15 years ago
- Ground: Gentil Valério
- Capacity: 2,500
- President: Chico Pinheiro
- 2023 2023: Série D, 63rd of 64; Rondoniense, 3rd of 6
- Website: realariquemes.com.br
Home colors	Away colors

Real Ariquemes Esporte Clube, commonly referred to as Real Ariquemes (Brazilian Portuguese: [ʁeˈaw aɾiˈkẽmis]), is a Brazilian football club based in Ariquemes, Rondônia. The club competes in the Série D, the fourth tier of the Brazilian football league system, as well as in the Campeonato Rondoniense, the top division in the Rondônia state football league system.

As of 2022, Real Ariquemes is the top-ranked team from Rondônia in CBF's national club ranking, being placed 119th overall.

== Stadium ==
Rondoniense play their home games at Valerião. The stadium has a maximum capacity of 5,000 people.

== Honours ==
=== State ===
- Campeonato Rondoniense
  - Winners (3): 2017, 2018, 2022
  - Runners-up (2): 2020, 2021

=== Women's Football ===
- Campeonato Rondoniense de Futebol Feminino
  - Winners (4): 2019, 2020, 2021, 2022
