= Vilhena =

Municipality in Rondônia, Brazil

- Municipality
- The Municipality of Vilhena
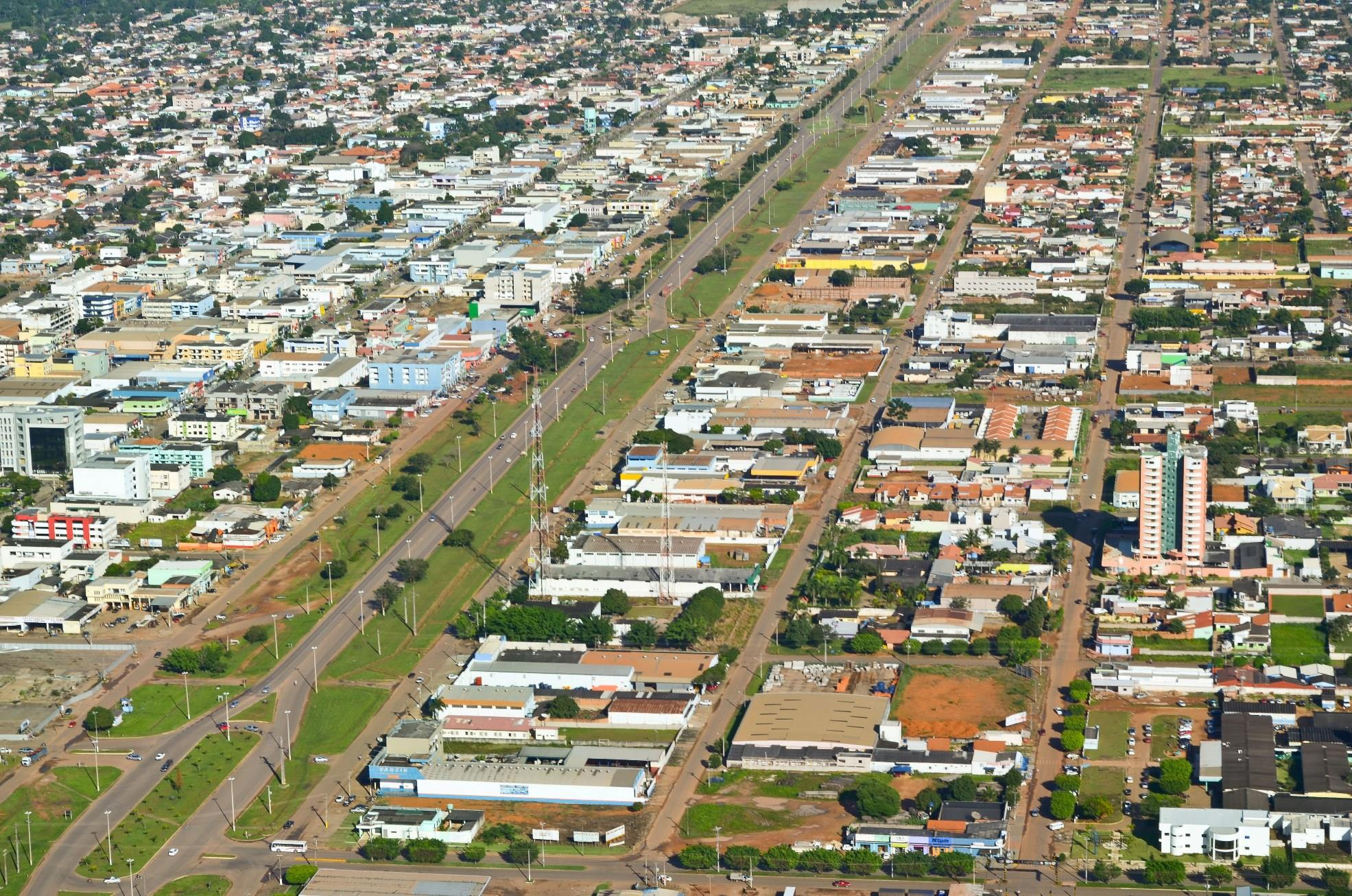
- Aerial view of Vilhena

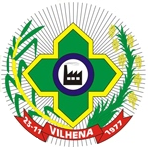
- Flag Coat of arms

- Location of Vilhena in the State of Rondônia
- Coordinates: 12°44′26″S 60°08′45″W
- Country: Brazil
- Region: North
- State: Rondônia
- Founded: November 23, 1977

Government
  - Mayor: Flori Cordeiro (PODE)

Area
  - Total: 11,519 km^{2} (4,448 sq mi)
- Elevation: 615 m (2,018 ft)

Population (2022 Census)
  - Total: 95,832
  - Estimate (2025): 109,651
  - Density: 5.5/km^{2} (14/sq mi)
- Time zone: UTC−4 (AMT)
- HDI (2000): 0.771 – medium
- Website: www.vilhena.ro.gov.br

Vilhena (pronounced [viˈʎenɐ]) is the easternmost municipality in the Brazilian state of Rondônia. Its population was 95,832 (2022 Census) and its area is 11,519 km^{2}. It is the fifth-largest city in Rondônia and has the best HDI in the state (0.771 – UNDP/2000). According to IBGE-2015, Vilhena also had a GDP of R$1.824.367,69 (approximately US$460 million), which represented a GDP per capita of R$23.055,20 (around US$6.000,00).

== History ==
In common with many other municipalities of Rondônia, Vilhena was started in the early twentieth century, around 1910, when Cândido Mariano da Silva Rondon built telegraph posts in the fields of the Plateau Parecis, linking several cities between Cuiabá and Porto Velho. Towns often would rise around these posts, Vilhena included.

== Population growth ==
Migration from southern and southeastern regions caused the population to increase in 1959 after the construction of highway BR-364, which connects the north with the rest of the country and was paved in 1986. The period in which the population rose more dramatically was the 1970s, as from 1964 many migrants from all over the country were attracted to the region because of the distribution of land to settlers by INCRA (National Institute of Colonization and Agrarian Reform). The region's wealth of wood in the forest sites and a healthy climate attracted many permanent residents, with a relevant participation of decedents from European migrants, who came firstly to the south of the country and were later attracted to this region by government incentives.

== Emancipation ==
In April 1969, Vilhena became district capital of Porto Velho by decree No. 565. Vilhena, at that time, had about only 160 homes, with an estimated population of 800. Simultaneously, the office of Civil Registry and the Court of Peace were established. The first administrator of the district of Vilhena was Gilberto Barros de Lima, who held the district post from March 1973 to June 1977. Several sawmills were started at this time.

On October 11, 1977, President Ernesto Geisel endorsed Law No. 6448, which broke down Vilhena of Porto Velho, being recognized as a city of Rondônia since then.

== Climate ==
The climate is a transition between equatorial and tropical, hot and humid, with some short periods of cool weather from May to September, when the minimum temperature can reach 7 °C in the coolest days, but normally it stays around 12-16 °C. The rainy season runs from October to April. The average annual temperature is approximately 23 °C, with maximum temperature average around 30-32 °C. On the hottest days, the temperature may reach 36 °C. The annual rainfall varies from 1800 to 2400mm. The high altitude in comparison with the region average (Vilhena is situated 615m above sea level, while other cities of the state are, as a general rule, around 100-200m above it) provides constant refreshing winds, mainly during the night, keeping the temperature pleasant.

== Transportation ==
Vilhena is served by Brigadeiro Camarão Airport, with a paved runway 2600m in length. Nowadays, the air transportation is operated by Azul Airlines, which offers daily one direct flight to Cuiabá (the capital of Mato Grosso State), where passengers can change flights to all the most important cities of the country.

Vilhena is linked by paved road (BR-364) to Porto Velho, the capital of Rondônia (approximately 700 km), located in the northwestern of the State, and, on the southeast direction, to Cuiabá, the capital of Mato Grosso (near 730 km), from where is possible drive through the other regions of the country.

Since 2010, when the Transoceanic Road was entirely paved, linking the State of Acre, in Brazil, to the city of Cusco, in Peru, transport by road, from Vilhena to other neighbor countries, such as Peru, Chile, Colombia and Bolívia, became shorter and quicker, representing a great facility to exportation of its production.

== Economy ==
In a recent past, cattle cutting predominated as the major economic activity for large and medium landowners. In 2005, the cattle herd had a head count of 116,426, which represented a dramatic decline in comparison with the amount in 1991 (approximately 900,000). This reduction can be explained by the pastures supplemental to crops, mainly for the cultivation of soybeans (with an annual production around 120,000 tons), so cattle are no longer the main source of agricultural economy. Other important agriculture cultivations also include corn, rice and bean. Agriculture and farming represent together 13.6% of the GDP, while industry and services represent 21.8% and 64.6%, respectively. The industries are mostly made up of companies linked to the agricultural activities, such as JBS-Friboi, the largest Brazilian multinational in the food industry, producing fresh, chilled, and processed beef, which is sold in the domestic market and also exported to several countries.

== Sport ==
The city has five competing professional football teams: Ajax F.C., Barcelona F.C., CA Rondoniense, Vihena EC and Vilhenense EC.
