= Sport Club Genus de Porto Velho =

Football club in Rondônia, Brazil

Genus
- Full name: Sport Club Genus de Porto Velho
- Nickname(s): Aurigrená da Capital (Golden and Garnet of the Capital); Time do Povo (People's Team)
- Founded: 15 November 1991; 33 years ago
- Ground: Aluízio Ferreira
- Capacity: 5,000
- President: Evaldo Silva
- League: Campeonato Rondoniense
- 2024: Rondoniense, 6th of 6
Home colors	Away colors

Sport Club Genus de Porto Velho, commonly referred to as Genus (Brazilian Portuguese: [ˈʒẽnus]), is a Brazilian football club based in Porto Velho, Rondônia. The club competes in the Campeonato Rondoniense Série A, the top division in the Rondônia state football league system.

Currently, Genus is the sixth-best ranked team from Rondônia in CBF's national club ranking, being placed 228th overall.

== History ==
Sport Club Genus de Porto Velho were founded on November 15, 1981 as Sport Club Genus Rondoniense. Genus competed in the Série C in 2001, and in the Série D in 2009, when they were eliminated in the second stage by São Raimundo. The club were renamed to Sport Club Genus de Porto Velho in 2006.

== Stadium ==
Genus play their home games at Aluízio Ferreira. The stadium has a maximum capacity of 7,000 people.

== Honours ==
=== State ===
- Campeonato Rondoniense
  - Winners (1): 2015
  - Runners-up (3): 2000, 2009, 2016

=== Women's Football ===
- Campeonato Rondoniense de Futebol Feminino
  - Winners (3): 2008, 2010, 2014
