= Espigão d'Oeste =

Municipality in Rondônia, Brazil

- Municipality
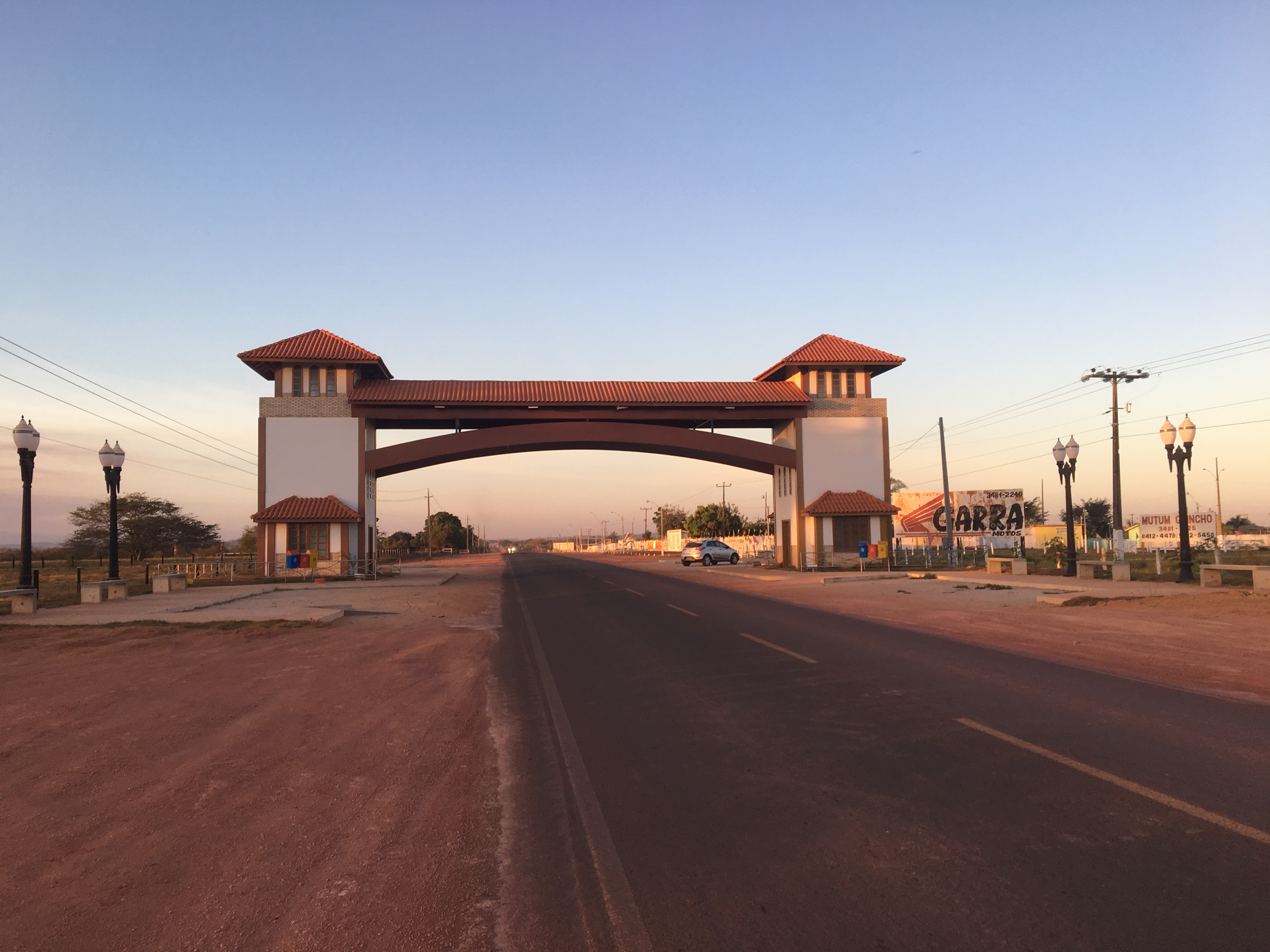

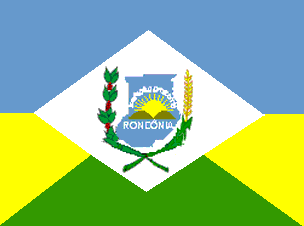
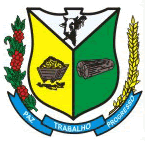
- Flag Coat of arms

- Location in Rondônia state

- Location in Brazil
- Coordinates: 11°31′29″S 61°0′46″W
- Country: Brazil
- Region: North
- State: Rondônia

Area
  - Total: 4,518 km^{2} (1,744 sq mi)

Population (2022)
  - Total: 29,414
  - Density: 6.510/km^{2} (16.86/sq mi)
- Time zone: UTC−4 (AMT)

Espigão d'Oeste is a city and municipality in Rondônia, Brazil. Titled the "Amazonian Pomerania," Espigão d'Oeste has the largest German Pomeranian population in the North Region. In 2023, Pomeranian was made a co-official language in the municipality. Close to 31% of the Roosevelt indigenous territory lies within the northwestern corner of Espigão d'Oeste.

== History ==
On April 13, 1956, the Melhorança family from Andradina, had arrived in Pimenta Bueno on their way to Acre for the integration of the Amazon Basin. They were invited by a Mr. Raimundo Euclides Barbosa to remain in the region. The Melhorança family then set up the colonization company " Itaporanga" (from Tupi itá "stone" and poranga "hard"). By February 1967 they had moved 28 km away from Pimenta Bueno and settled on a hill, the eponymous Espigão "spike". By 1969 Espigão d'Oeste had grown into a sizable village and on June 16, 1981, it had been separated from Pimenta Bueno and established as its own municipality.

Between 1969 and 1990, about 40,000 people from Espírito Santo, mainly Pomeranian families, left for Espigão do Oeste. They were driven by the military dictatorship to colonize the Amazon after coffee production had been eradicated in the 1960s. Vila Pavão lost 40% of its population to Espigão do Oeste and the two cities still maintain close relations.

== Population ==
In the 2022 census, Espigão d'Oeste had a population of 29,414 with an estimated population of 32,842 for 2025, making it the 12th most populous municipality in Rondônia.

In the 2010 census Catholics made up 43.98% of the population, Protestants made up 41.18%, and other religious groups made up the rest. A majority of Protestants were Lutherans with 5,217 members and Pentecostals made up the second largest group with 4,276 members. This made Espigão d'Oeste the municipality with the largest number of Lutherans in Rondônia.

The large number of Lutherans is attributed to the city's Pomeranian heritage. From the 1960s to the 1980s there was a mass immigration of Pomeranian families from Vila Pavão and other parts of Espírito Santo to Espigão d'Oeste. It has been titled the "Pomerania of the Amazon" with about half of the population having Pomeranian heritage.

Indigenous people make up 2.45% of the population with seven indigenous villages scattered throughout the municipality: 14 de Abril, Tonhão, Capitão Cardoso, Apaterééj, Roosevelt, Ponte (João Bravo), and Gasereh (Paiter-Suruí). Close to 31% of Roosevelt indigenous territory or 1,388 km2 of land are located in northwestern corner of the municipality. In 2014 the indigenous territory has a population of 1,817 and is home to the Cinta larga and Apurinã.

== Education ==
=== Students and Schools ===
There are 28 schools in the county.

=== Major schools ===
- School 7 September: State School pioneer town, founded in 1973. It is located in the city center, which serves about 865 students in Middle school (1st to 3rd year).
- Jean Piaget School: State School located in Morada do Sol neighborhood, where 960 students watch. Since elementary school students (1st to 9th grades) and High School (1st to 3rd year).
- School Jerris Adriani Turatti: State School founded on 20 December 1991. It is located in Vista Alegre neighborhood, which serves 883 elementary school students (1st to 9th grade).
- School Vinicius de Moraes: State School, located in the neighborhood Caixa d'Agua. It serves about 700 elementary students (1st to 9th grade).
- School of Paula Fernanda Souza: State School, located in Liberty neighborhood. Serves 685 elementary students (1st to 9th grade).
- School Teobaldo Ferreira: Municipal School founded in 1996. It is located in the neighborhood Jorge Teixeira and serves 530 elementary students. (1st to 9th grade)
- School Monteiro Lobato: Private School, founded on 16 May 1994. It is located in St. Joseph neighborhood, which serves 301 students. Given students' teachings Child Elementary (1st to 9th grade) and Middle (1st to 3rd year).

=== IDEB ===
Espigão do Oeste has one of the best IDEB (Index of Basic Education Development) state of Rondônia, according to the Ministry of Education the year 2009.

- Network municipal

Initial Years (1st to 5th grade)

- IDEB 2011: 4,8 (13th best of RO);
- IDEB 2009: 4,5 (10th best of RO).

Final Years (6th to 9th grade)

- IDEB 2011: 3,9 (9th best of RO);
- IDEB 2009: 4,1 (2nd best of RO).
- Network state

Initial Years (1st to 5th grade)

- IDEB 2011: 5,1 (11th best of RO);
- IDEB 2009: 4,9 (5th best of RO).

Final Years (6th to 9th grade)

- IDEB 2011: 4,4 (2nd best of RO);
- IDEB 2009: 4,4 (Best of RO).
- Public Network

Initial Years (1st to 5th grade)

- IDEB 2011: 5,0 (13th best of RO);
- IDEB 2009: 4,8 (4th best of RO).

Final Years (6th to 9th grade)

- IDEB 2011: 4,2 (3rd best of RO);
- IDEB 2009: 4,4 (best of RO).

=== OBMEP ===
Schools Espigão do Oeste regularly participate in Brazilian Mathematical Olympiad Public Schools, getting many hits. Since its first appearance in OBMEP in 2005 by 2011, the city won six medals Bronze and 59 Honorable Mentions. In 2008 and 2011 the city was awarded with a Trophy, to get the best grade average Rondônia.

== Neighborhoods ==
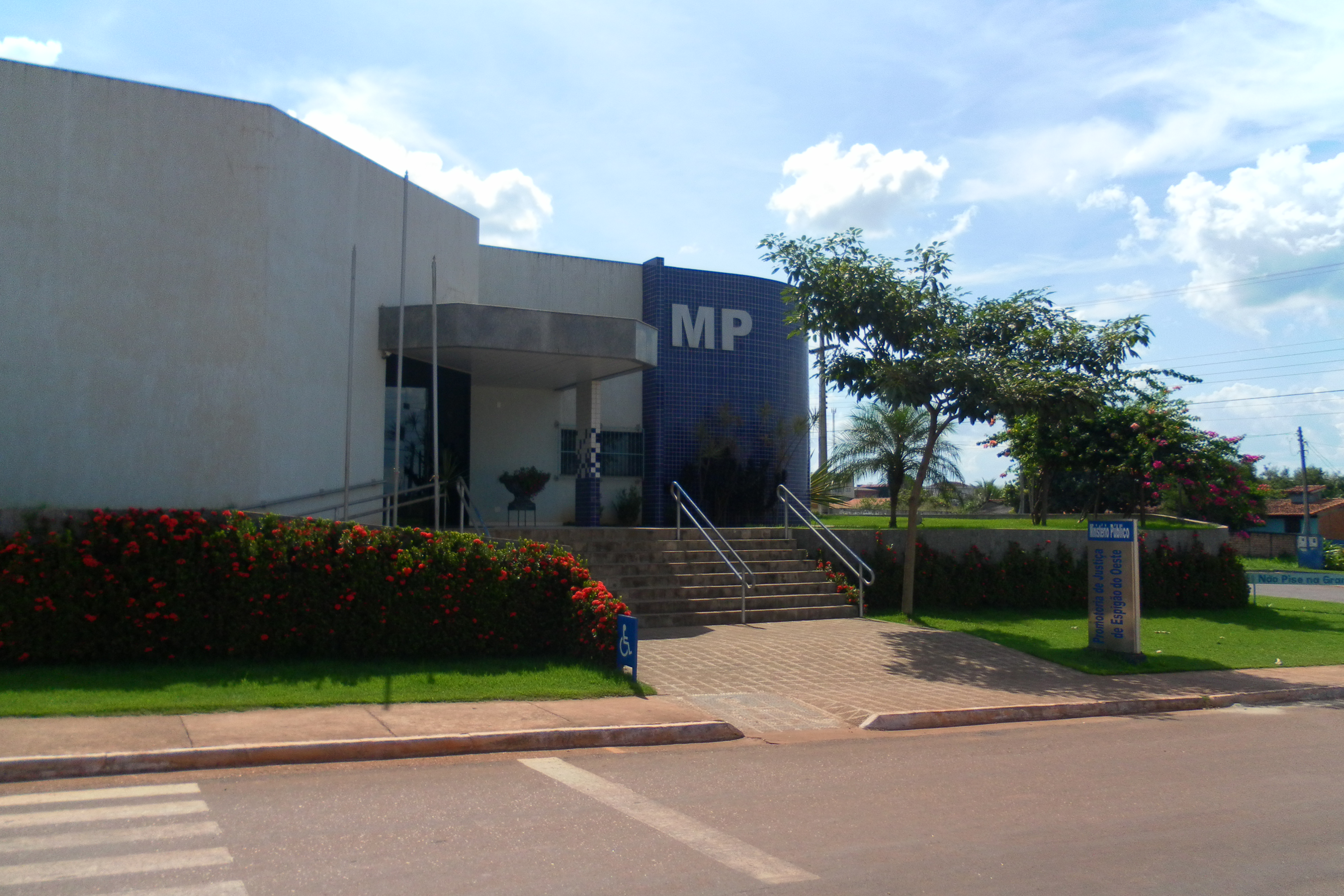
Prosecutor of Espigão do Oeste

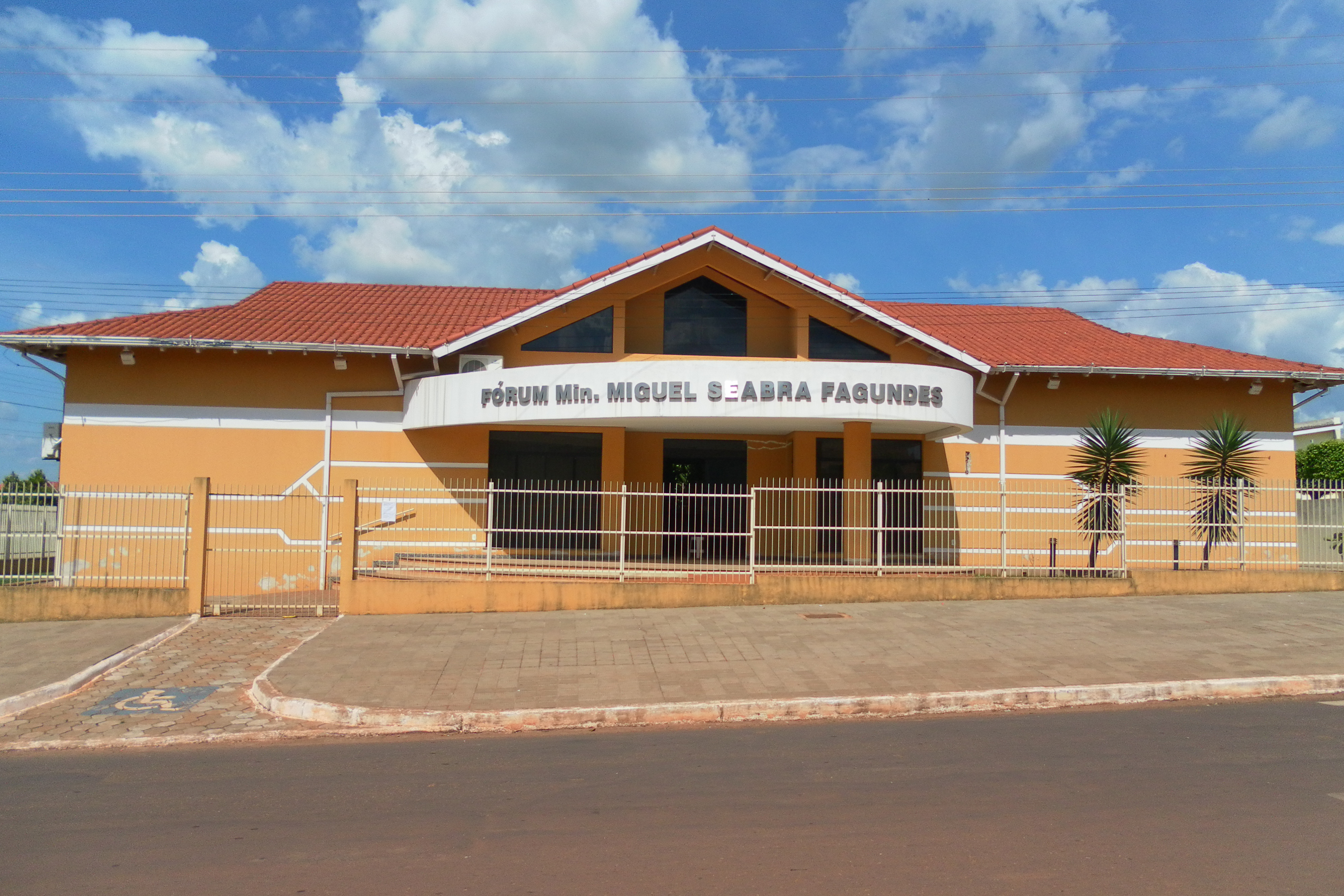
Forum of Espigão do Oeste

- Centre: Motorcycling Federation of Rondônia State, Supermarket s, civilian police, Banco Bradesco, Caixa Economica Federal, Credip, Credi Espigão, Radio Romiporã FM, Municipal Plaza, The Journal Coun South, Hospital San Lucas, Presidio, Road and School 7 September;
- Caixa d'Agua: CAERD, TV Tower, Military Police and School Vinicius de Moraes;
- Jorge Teixeira: School Teobaldo Ferreira;
- Liberty: Stadium, Radio Mega FM, Gymnasium Hall, Stage Events, Club Municipal, Cemetery s, Hospital Municipality, and School Fernanda Souza de Paula;
- Address of the Sun: School Jean Piaget;
- New Horizon;
- St. Joseph: School Monteiro Lobato;
- Vista Alegre: Forum Hall, City Hall, Post Office, Bank of Brazil, Supermarket s, Seduc, Public Defender, Public Ministry, Social Security, City Hall, Idaron, SINDSEF, Semas, Rotary Club, Trade Association, Library Hall, Hospital Memorial and School Jerris Adriani Turatti.

== See also ==
- List of municipalities in Rondônia
