= Rolim de Moura =

Municipality in Rondônia, Brazil

- Municipality
- The Municipality of Rolim de Moura
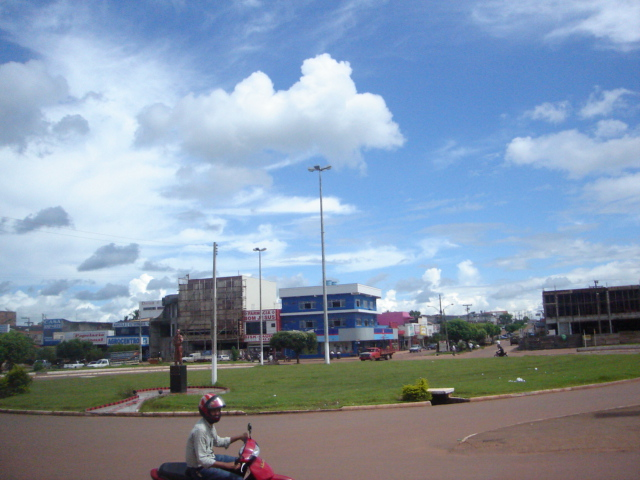

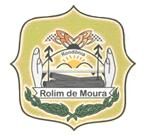
- Flag Coat of arms

- Location of Rolim de Moura in the State of Rondônia

- Location in Brazil
- Coordinates: 11°43′32″S 61°46′41″W
- Country: Brazil
- Region: North
- State: Rondônia
- Incorporated: August 5, 1983

Government
  - Mayor: Ceser Cassol (PP)

Area
  - Total: 1,457.885 km^{2} (562.893 sq mi)
- Elevation: 6.7 m (22 ft)

Population (2020)
  - Total: 55,407
  - Density: 35.079/km^{2} (90.85/sq mi)
- Time zone: UTC−4 (AMT)

Rolim de Moura is a municipality located in the Brazilian state of Rondônia. Its population was 55,407 (2020) and its area is 1,457.885 km^{2}.

== History ==
In 1979, the Rolim de Moura Colonization Project was launched, aimed at the settlement of surplus settlers in the Amazon rainforest from the extension of the Integrated Colonization Project GY Paraná or Ji-Paraná. This was implemented in this area by INCRA, which distributed plots of land in rural areas to thousands of families. From then on, people who arrived by the hundreds began to build the city, initially made up of shacks.

Rolim de Moura was elevated to the category of municipality through State Decree Law nº 71, of August 5, 1983.
Its first mayor was Valdir Raupp de Matos, elected on December 9, 1984, and who took office on January 1, 1985.

The name of the city was given in honor of Dom Antônio Rolim de Moura Tavares, Viscount of Azambuja and second governor of the captaincy of Mato Grosso, for his services rendered to the region of the Guaporé valley.

== See also ==
- List of municipalities in Rondônia
