= Ji-Paraná Futebol Clube =

Football club in Ji-Paraná, Brazil

Ji-Paraná
- Full name: Ji-Paraná Futebol Clube
- Nicknames: Galo da BR; Galo Azul
- Founded: 22 April 1991; 35 years ago
- Ground: Biancão
- Capacity: 5,000
- President: José Carlos Vitor
- League: Campeonato Rondoniense Série A
- 2025: Rondoniense, 3rd of 7
- Website: http://www.jipafc.com.br/
Home colors	Away colors

Ji-Paraná Futebol Clube, commonly referred to as Ji-Paraná (Brazilian Portuguese: [ʒipaɾɐˈna]), is a Brazilian football club based in Ji-Paraná, Rondônia. The club competes in the Campeonato Rondoniense Série A, the top division in the Rondônia state football league system.

The club is Rondônia's most successful club still in activity.

As of 2022, Ji-Paraná is the fifth-best ranked team from Rondônia in CBF's national club ranking, being placed 170th overall.

== History ==
On 22 April 1991, Ji-Paraná was founded.

On 18 August 1991, the club played its first official match, against Operário of Rondônia. The Campeonato Rondoniense match was played in Pimenta Bueno, and ended in a 1-1 draw.

On 18 September 1991, the club won its first match. The club beat Colorado of Rondônia 3-1, in Cerejeiras.

On 15 December 1991, Ji-Paraná won the Campeonato Rondoniense, its first title. The club beat Ferroviário of Rondônia in the final. The competition's top goalscorer was Itamar, of Ji-Paraná.

In 1992, the club disputed the Campeonato Brasileiro Série C for the first time. Ji-Paraná was eliminated in the first stage, after finishing in the group's last position. The club also disputed Copa do Brasil for the first time in that year, and was eliminated in the first stage by Grêmio.

In 1995, Ji-Paraná disputed again the Campeonato Brasileiro Série C. The club was eliminated by Atlético Goianiense in the quarterfinals.

In 1996, Ji-Paraná reached the Campeonato Brasileiro Série C third stage. The club was eliminated by Nacional of Amazonas.

In 1997, the club reached the fourth stage of the Série C. Juventus of São Paulo eliminated the club.

In 1999, 2002, 2004 and 2005, Ji-Paraná disputed the Série C. In all those seasons the club was eliminated in the first stage.

In 2000, the club reached Copa do Brasil's second stage. It was the club's all-time best performance in the competition. Ji-Paraná was eliminated by Bahia in that year.

== Honours ==
- Campeonato Rondoniense
  - Winners (9): 1991, 1992, 1995, 1996, 1997, 1998, 1999, 2001, 2012
  - Runners-up (5): 1994, 2004, 2005, 2019, 2023
- Copa Rondônia
  - Winners (1): 2001
- Campeonato Rondoniense Second Division
  - Winners (1): 2011

== Stadium ==
The club's home matches are usually played at Biancão stadium, which has a maximum capacity of 3,000 people. Ji-Paraná also plays at pt:Biancão, which has a maximum capacity of 5,000 people.

== Nickname ==
Ji-Paraná is nicknamed Jipa, which is a syllabic abbreviation of the club's name. Another club's nickname is Galo da BR, meaning Rooster of the BR. BR is the name of a highway

== Colors ==
The club's colors are blue, white and red.

== Mascot ==
Ji-Paraná's mascot is a rooster (galo in Portuguese language).
