= Ariquemes =

Municipality in Rondônia, Brazil

- Municipality
- The Municipality of Ariquemes
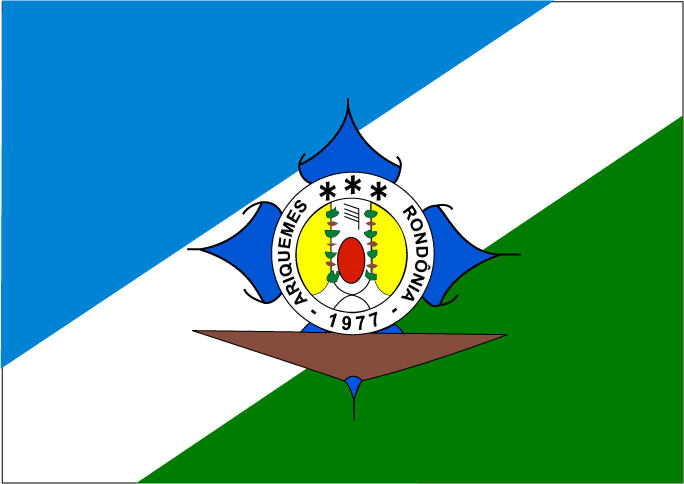
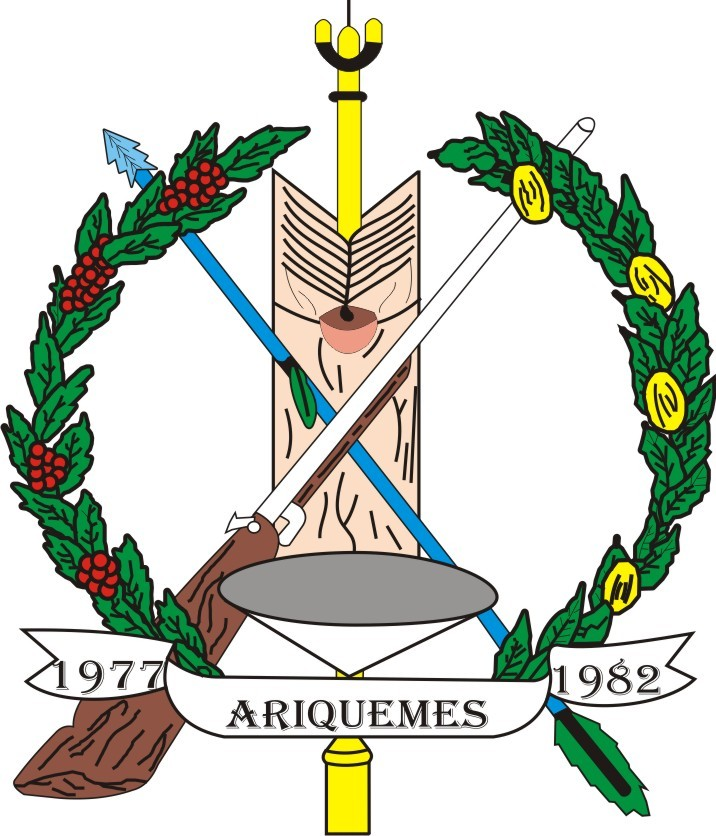
- Flag Coat of arms

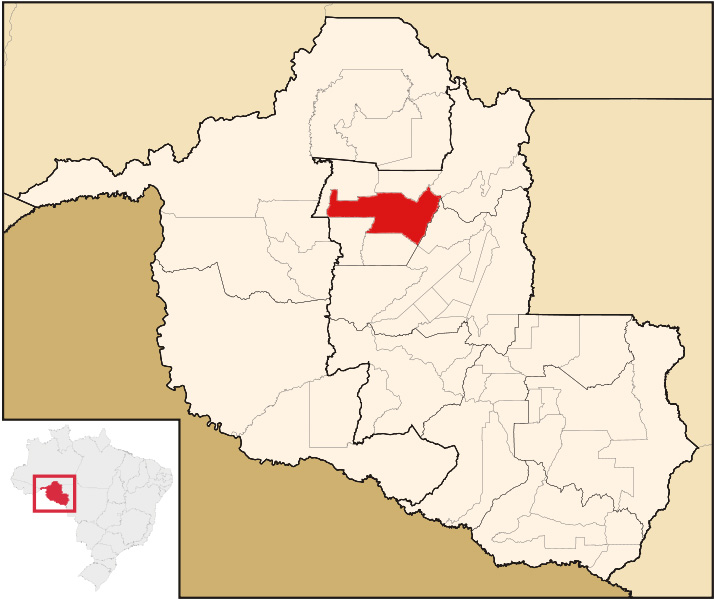
- Location of Ariquemes in the State of Rondônia

- Location of Ariquemes
- Coordinates: 09°54′58″S 63°02′27″W
- Country: Brazil
- Region: North
- State: Rondônia
- Founded: November 21, 1977

Government
  - Mayor: Thiago Leite Flores Pereira (PMDB)

Area
  - Total: 4,427 km^{2} (1,709 sq mi)
- Elevation: 142 m (466 ft)

Population (2022 Census)
  - Total: 96,833
  - Estimate (2025): 109,170
  - Density: 21.87/km^{2} (56.65/sq mi)
- Time zone: UTC−4 (AMT)
- HDI (2000): 0.752 – medium
- Website: www.ariquemes.ro.gov.br

Ariquemes is a municipality located in the Brazilian state of Rondônia. Its population was 96,833 (2022 Census) and its area is 4,427 km^{2}. It is the third-largest city in Rondônia state.

== Transportation ==
The city is served by Ariquemes Airport.

== See also ==
- List of municipalities in Rondônia
