= 1978 in Brazilian football =

Football in Brazil
- Season: 1978

The following article presents a summary of the 1978 football (soccer) season in Brazil, which was the 77th season of competitive football in the country.

== Campeonato Brasileiro Série A ==
Quarterfinals

Team 1	Agg.	Team 2	1st leg	2nd leg
Internacional	2-2	Santa Cruz	1-0	1-2
Palmeiras	3-2	Bahia	2-1	1-1
Vasco da Gama	2-2	Grêmio	1-1	1-1
Sport	0-6	Guarani	0-2	0-4

Semifinals

Team 1	Agg.	Team 2	1st leg	2nd leg
Guarani	4-2	Vasco da Gama	2-1	2-1
Palmeiras	3-1	Internacional	2-0	1-1

Final

August 10, 1978

Palmeiras	0–1	Guarani

Morumbi

August 13, 1978

Guarani	1–0	Palmeiras

Brinco de Ouro

Guarani declared as the Campeonato Brasileiro champions by aggregate score of 2-0.

== State championship champions ==
State	Champion	State	Champion
Acre	Rio Branco-AC	Pará	Remo
Alagoas	CRB	Paraíba	Botafogo-PB
Amapá	Macapá	Paraná	Coritiba
Amazonas	Nacional	Pernambuco	Santa Cruz
Bahia	Bahia	Piauí	River
Ceará	Ceará	Rio de Janeiro	Goytacaz
Distrito Federal	Brasília	Rio Grande do Norte	ABC
Espírito Santo	Rio Branco-ES	Rio Grande do Sul	Internacional
Goiás	Vila Nova	Rondônia	Ferroviário-RO
Guanabara	Flamengo	Roraima	Atlético Roraima
Maranhão	Sampaio Corrêa	Santa Catarina	Joinville
Mato Grosso	Operário-CG	São Paulo	Santos
Mato Grosso do Sul	-	Sergipe	Itabaiana
Minas Gerais	Atlético Mineiro	Tocantins	-

== Youth competition champions ==
Competition	Champion
Copa São Paulo de Juniores	Internacional

== Other competition champions ==
Competition	Champion
Torneio de Integração da Amazônia	Moto Clube

== Brazilian clubs in international competitions ==
Team	Copa Libertadores 1978
Atlético Mineiro	Semifinals
São Paulo	Group stage

== Brazil national team ==
The following table lists all the games played by the Brazil national football team in official competitions and friendly matches during 1978.

Date	Opposition	Result	Score	Brazil scorers	Competition
March 12, 1978	(Rio de Janeiro (state)) Rio de Janeiro State Countryside Combined Team	W	7-0	Zico (5), Nunes, Rivellino	International Friendly (unofficial match)
March 19, 1978	Goiás State Combined Team	W	3-1	Reinaldo, Zico, Tarciso	International Friendly (unofficial match)
March 23, 1978	(Paraná (state)) Paraná State Combined Team	W	3-1	Nunes	International Friendly (unofficial match)
April 1, 1978	France	L	0-1	-	International Friendly
April 5, 1978	West Germany	W	1-0	Nunes	International Friendly
April 10, 1978	(Saudi Arabia) Al-Ahli	W	6-1	Toninho Cerezo, Nunes (2), Gil, Jorge Mendonça, Toninho	International Friendly (unofficial match)
April 13, 1978	(Italy) Internazionale	W	2-0	Nunes, Dirceu	International Friendly (unofficial match)
April 19, 1978	England	D	1-1	Gil	International Friendly
April 21, 1978	(Spain) Atlético Madrid	W	3-0	Nunes, Edinho, Jorge Mendonça	International Friendly (unofficial match)
May 1, 1978	Peru	W	3-0	Zico, Reinaldo (2)	International Friendly
May 13, 1978	Pernambuco State Combined Team	D	0-0	-	International Friendly (unofficial match)
May 17, 1978	Czechoslovakia	W	2-0	Reinaldo, Zico	International Friendly
May 25, 1978	Rio Grande do Sul State Combined Team	D	2-2	Toninho, Nelinho	International Friendly (unofficial match)
June 3, 1978	Sweden	D	1-1	Reinaldo	World Cup
June 7, 1978	Spain	D	0-0	-	World Cup
June 11, 1978	Austria	W	1-0	Roberto Dinamite	World Cup
June 14, 1978	Peru	W	3-0	Dirceu (2), Zico	World Cup
June 18, 1978	Argentina	D	0-0	-	World Cup
June 21, 1978	Poland	W	3-1	Nelinho, Roberto Dinamite (2)	World Cup
June 24, 1978	Italy	W	2-1	Nelinho, Dirceu	World Cup
