= 2003 in Brazilian football =

Football in Brazil
- Season: 2003

The following article presents a summary of the 2003 football (soccer) season in Brazil, which was the 102nd season of competitive football in the country.

== Campeonato Brasileiro Série A ==
Pos	Team	Pld	W	D	L	GF	GA	GD	Pts	Qualification or relegation
1	Cruzeiro	46	31	7	8	102	47	+55	100	Qualified for 2004 Copa Libertadores and 2004 Copa Sudamericana
2	Santos	46	25	12	9	93	60	+33	87	Qualified for 2004 Copa Libertadores and 2004 Copa Sudamericana
3	São Paulo	46	22	12	12	81	67	+14	78	Qualified for 2004 Copa Libertadores and 2004 Copa Sudamericana
4	São Caetano	46	19	14	13	53	37	+16	74	Qualified for 2004 Copa Libertadores and 2004 Copa Sudamericana
5	Coritiba	46	21	10	15	67	58	+9	73	Qualified for 2004 Copa Libertadores and 2004 Copa Sudamericana
6	Internacional	46	20	10	16	59	57	+2	72	Qualified for 2004 Copa Sudamericana
7	Atlético Mineiro	46	19	15	12	76	62	+14	72	Qualified for 2004 Copa Sudamericana
8	Flamengo	46	18	12	16	66	73	−7	66	Qualified for 2004 Copa Sudamericana
9	Goiás	46	18	11	17	78	63	+15	65	Qualified for 2004 Copa Sudamericana
10	Paraná	46	18	11	17	85	75	+10	65	Qualified for 2004 Copa Sudamericana
11	Figueirense	46	17	14	15	62	54	+8	65	Qualified for 2004 Copa Sudamericana
12	Atlético-PR	46	17	10	19	67	72	−5	61	
13	Guarani	46	17	10	19	64	72	−8	61	
14	Criciúma	46	17	9	20	57	69	−12	60	
15	Corinthians	46	15	12	19	61	63	−2	59	
16	Vitória	46	15	11	20	50	64	−14	56	
17	Vasco	46	13	15	18	57	69	−12	54	
18	Juventude	46	12	14	20	55	70	−15	53	
19	Fluminense	46	13	11	22	52	77	−25	52	
20	Grêmio (Note: Grêmio qualified to 2004 Copa Sudamericana due to a CONMEBOL ranking (São Paulo, Cruzeiro and Flamengo also qualified via CONMEBOL ranking).)	46	13	11	22	54	68	−14	50	Qualified for 2004 Copa Sudamericana
21	Ponte Preta (Note: Ponte Preta docked the points conquisted in the matches against Internacional and Juventude for the irregulate fielding of the player Roberto. Otherwise, Internacional won 2 points and Juventude won 3 points.)	46	11	18	17	63	73	−10	50	
22	Paysandu (Note: Paysandu docked 8 points due to irregularities fielding of the players Júnior Amorim and Aldrovani. In other way, three points won to Ponte Preta, three for São Caetano, two for Corinthians and two for Fluminense.)	46	15	12	19	74	77	−3	49	
23	Fortaleza (R)	46	12	13	21	58	74	−16	49	Relegation to Série B
24	Bahia (R)	46	12	10	24	59	92	−33	46	Relegation to Série B

(R) Relegated
Notes:

Cruzeiro declared as the Campeonato Brasileiro champions.

=== Relegation ===
The two worst placed teams, which are Fortaleza and Bahia, were relegated to the following year's second level.

== Campeonato Brasileiro Série B ==
Final stage
Pos	Team	Pld	W	D	L	GF	GA	GD	Pts	Promotion
1	Palmeiras	6	5	1	0	12	3	+9	16	Promoted to Série A 2004
2	Botafogo	6	2	2	2	9	10	−1	8	Promoted to Série A 2004
3	Sport	6	1	2	3	6	8	−2	5	
4	Marília	6	0	3	3	2	8	−6	3	

Source: rsssf.com

Palmeiras declared as the Campeonato Brasileiro Série B champions.

=== Promotion ===
The two best placed teams in the final stage of the competition, which are Palmeiras and Botafogo, were promoted to the following year's first level.

=== Relegation ===
The two worst placed teams, which are Gama and União São João, were relegated to the following year's third level.

== Campeonato Brasileiro Série C ==
Pos	Team	Pld	W	D	L	GF	GA	GD	Pts	ITU	SAD	BPB	CPN
1	Ituano (P)	6	3	2	1	9	7	+2	11		2–1	2–1	1–0
2	Santo André (P)	6	3	1	2	7	5	+2	10	0–0		0–1	1–0
3	Botafogo-PB	6	2	1	3	8	12	−4	7	4–4	1–3		1–0
4	Campinense	6	2	0	4	5	5	0	6	1–0	1–2	3–0	

Source: rsssf.com
(P) Promoted to Série B 2004

Ituano declared as the Campeonato Brasileiro Série C champions.

=== Promotion ===
The two best placed teams in the final stage of the competition, which are Ituano and Santo André, were promoted to the following year's second level.

== Copa do Brasil ==
The Copa do Brasil final was played between Cruzeiro and Flamengo.

June 8, 2003

Flamengo	1–1	Cruzeiro

Maracanã

June 11, 2003

Cruzeiro	3–1	Flamengo

Mineirão

Cruzeiro declared as the cup champions by aggregate score of 4–2.

== State championship champions ==
State	Champion	State	Champion
Acre	Rio Branco	Paraíba	Botafogo-PB
Alagoas	ASA	Paraná	Coritiba
Amapá	Ypiranga	Pernambuco	Sport Recife
Amazonas	Nacional	Piauí	Flamengo-PI
Bahia	Vitória	Rio de Janeiro	Vasco
Ceará	Fortaleza	Rio Grande do Norte	América-RN
Distrito Federal	Gama	Rio Grande do Sul	Internacional
Espírito Santo	Serra	Rondônia	União Cacoalense
Goiás	Goiás	Roraima	Atlético Roraima
Maranhão	Sampaio Corrêa	Santa Catarina	Figueirense
Mato Grosso	Cuiabá	São Paulo	Corinthians
Mato Grosso do Sul	SERC	Sergipe	Sergipe
Minas Gerais	Cruzeiro	Tocantins	Palmas
Pará	Remo		

== Youth competition champions ==
Competition	Champion
Copa Macaé de Juvenis	Fluminense
Copa Santiago de Futebol Juvenil	Internacional
Copa São Paulo de Juniores	Santo André
Copa Sub-17 de Promissão	Corinthians
Taça Belo Horizonte de Juniores	Flamengo

== Other competition champions ==
Competition	Champion
Campeonato do Nordeste	Vitória
Copa Espírito Santo	Estrela do Norte
Copa FPF	Santo André
Copa Paraná	Atlético Paranaense
Copa Pernambuco	Sport
Taça Minas Gerais	Uberlândia
Torneio de Integração da Amazônia	CFA

== Brazilian clubs in international competitions ==
Team	Copa Libertadores 2003	Copa Sudamericana 2003	Recopa Sudamericana 2003
Atlético Mineiro	did not qualify	1st Preliminary round	N/A
Corinthians	Round of 16	1st Preliminary round	N/A
Cruzeiro	did not qualify	1st Preliminary round	N/A
Flamengo	did not qualify	1st Preliminary round	N/A
Fluminense	did not qualify	2nd Preliminary round	N/A
Grêmio	Quarterfinals	1st Preliminary round	N/A
Internacional	did not qualify	1st Preliminary round	N/A
Palmeiras	did not qualify	Preliminary round	N/A
Paysandu	Round of 16	did not qualify	N/A
Santos	Runner-up	Quarterfinals	N/A
São Caetano	did not qualify	2nd Preliminary round	N/A
São Paulo	did not qualify	Semifinals	N/A
Vasco	did not qualify	1st Preliminary round	N/A

== Brazil national team ==
The following table lists all the games played by the Brazil national football team in official competitions and friendly matches during 2003.

Date	Opposition	Result	Score	Brazil scorers	Competition
February 12, 2003	China	D	0–0	-	International Friendly
March 29, 2003	Portugal	L	1–2	Ronaldinho	International Friendly
April 30, 2003	Mexico	D	0–0	-	International Friendly
June 11, 2003	Nigeria	W	3–0	Gil, Luís Fabiano, Adriano	International Friendly
June 19, 2003	Cameroon	L	0–1	-	Confederations Cup
June 21, 2003	United States	W	1–0	Adriano	Confederations Cup
June 23, 2003	Turkey	D	2–2	Adriano, Alex	Confederations Cup
July 13, 2003	Mexico	L	0–1	-	Gold Cup
July 15, 2003	Honduras	W	2–1	Maicon, Diego	Gold Cup
July 19, 2003	Colombia	W	2–0	Kaká (2)	Gold Cup
July 23, 2003	United States	W	2–1 (aet)	Kaká, Diego	Gold Cup
July 27, 2003	Mexico	L	0–1 (aet)	-	Gold Cup
September 7, 2003	Colombia	W	2–1	Ronaldo, Kaká	World Cup Qualifying
September 10, 2003	Ecuador	W	1–0	Ronaldinho	World Cup Qualifying
October 12, 2003	Jamaica	W	1–0	Roberto Carlos	International Friendly
November 16, 2003	Peru	D	1–1	Rivaldo	World Cup Qualifying
November 19, 2003	Uruguay	D	3–3	Kaká, Ronaldo (2)	World Cup Qualifying

== Women's football ==
=== Brazil women's national football team ===
The following table lists all the games played by the Brazil women's national football team in official competitions and friendly matches during 2003.

Date	Opposition	Result	Score	Brazil scorers	Competition
April 23, 2003	Argentina	W	3–2	Kátia Cilene, Pretinha, Rosana	Sudamericano Femenino
April 25, 2003	Peru	W	3–0	Formiga, Pretinha, Marta	Sudamericano Femenino
April 27, 2003	Colombia	W	12–0	Pretinha (2), Formiga, Marta (3), Kátia Cilene (5), Cristiane Silva	Sudamericano Femenino
July 13, 2003	United States	L	0–1	-	International Friendly
July 17, 2003	Canada	L	1–2	Tatiana	International Friendly
July 20, 2003	Canada	L	1–2	Cristiane Silva	International Friendly
August 2, 2003	Haiti	W	5–0	Marta, Kelly, Formiga, Renata Costa, Maycon	Pan American Games
August 8, 2003	Canada	W	5–0	Renata Costa, Formiga, Marta, Maycon, Elaine	Pan American Games
August 11, 2003	Argentina	W	2–1	Marta (2)	Pan American Games
August 14, 2003	Canada	W	1–1 (aet: 1–0)	Formiga, Cristiane Silva	Pan American Games
September 21, 2003	South Korea	W	3–0	Marta, Kátia Cilene (2)	World Cup
September 24, 2003	Norway	W	4–1	Daniela Alves, Rosana, Marta, Kátia Cilene	World Cup
September 27, 2003	France	D	1–1	Kátia Cilene	World Cup
October 1, 2003	Sweden	L	1–2	Marta	World Cup

The Brazil women's national football team competed in the following competitions in 2003:

Competition	Performance
World Cup	Quarterfinals
Sudamericano Femenino	Champions
Pan American Games	Champions

=== Domestic competition champions ===
Competition	Champion
Circuito Brasileiro	Saad
