= Sídney (footballer, born 1963) =

Brazilian footballer

Personal information
- Full name: Sídney José Tobias
- Date of birth: 20 August 1963 (age 63)
- Place of birth: São Paulo, Brazil
- Position: Forward

Youth career
- –1983: São Paulo

Senior career*
Years	Team	Apps	(Gls)
1983–1988	São Paulo	200	(17)
1987	→ Flamengo (loan)		
1988	→ Marítimo (loan)	2	(1)
1988	Santos		
1989–1992	Atlético Goianiense		
1992–1995	Grêmio Maringá		
1995–1996	Al-Nasr		

International career
1983	Brazil U20		
1986	Brazil	2	(0)

Managerial career
- 2020: Guajará
- * Club domestic league appearances and goals

Sídney José Tobias (born 20 August 1963), also known as Sídney or Sídney Tobias, is a Brazilian former professional football player and manager who played as a forward.

== Club career ==
Sídney was part of the generation that became known at São Paulo FC as "Menudos do Morumbi", and won multiple titles for the club. After leaving São Paulo, he was also champion at Atlético Goianiense.

== International career ==
Sídney was part of the squad who won the 1983 FIFA World Youth Championship. For the Brazil A, made two appearances, in friendly matches against the East Germany and Hungary, in March 1986.

== Managerial career ==
In 2020, he was the coach of Guajará in the Campeonato Rondoniense.

== Personal life ==
His brother, Toninho Tobias, was also a professional footballer and won the 1993 edition of the Copa São Paulo de Futebol Júnior, with São Paulo FC.

== Honours ==
São Paulo

- Campeonato Paulista: 1985, 1987
- Campeonato Brasileiro: 1986

Atlético Goianiense

- Campeonato Brasileiro Série C: 1990

Brazil U20

- FIFA U-20 World Cup: 1983
