= Sport Clube Shallon =

Football club in Porto Velho, Brazil

Shallon
- Full name: Sport Clube Shallon
- Nickname(s): Pomba da paz
- Founded: 5 January 1991; 34 years ago
- Ground: Aluízio Ferreira
- Capacity: 5,000
- President: Odilon de Gois Campos
- 2010: Rondoniense, 6th of 8
Home colours	Away colours

Sport Clube Shallon, commonly referred to as Shallon (Brazilian Portuguese: [ʃaˈlõw]), is a currently inactive Brazilian football club based in Porto Velho, Rondônia. It was founded in 1991, although, it was only registered professionally in 2000. Their colors are red, black and white.

== History ==
The club was officially founded on 24 April 2000, but it exist and works since 1991. In 2008, the club, won the vice-championship of the second division of the state championship. In 2016, the club assumed the responsibility to run PRVFC social project, which exist since 14 September 2013.

=== Social Project PRVFC ===
Aiming to contribute to the reduction of social problems in areas of great vulnerability, existing in the municipality of Porto Velho, through the insertion of the civil society inserted in this context, the motivation to perform actions directed to the sports area arises, with the consequent formation professional; environmental education; education aimed at a culture of peace and non-violence (UNESCO - Manifest 2000). The "Projeto Renovando Vidas e Fazendo Craques - PRVFC, (The renewing lives and making experts project) was born with the purpose of building lives, educating citizens aware of their duties and rights, and also to conceive training in vocational courses and educational training to elementary and secondary education students, which will contribute significantly to their inclusion in the labor market.

This way, we recognize the share of responsibility of each individual with the future of humanity, especially with the children of today and those of future generations. Still, as an incentive to the integral education of children and adolescents, the project focuses on Educational Policies at a broad level, establishing goals that aim to invest in the process and construction of the individual, being: Learning to be, Learning to do, Learning to Live and Learning to Know, where it is contemplated the integral education of the students, who are the clientele involved in the construction of this new paradigm.

Acknowledging as part of the responsibility towards life, Sports Education, as the initiator of the Project and, in the other areas, football is a valuable tool, as through it, children and adolescents can be educated to form generations with new sports talents in the area of field soccer, pacifist citizens, aware of the conservation and protection of the environment, as well as knowing the importance of life in a spiritual context.

Finally, the Project aims to contribute to the training of individuals through the promotion of technical sports skills, development of dialogue, argumentation, cooperation in the search for individual and collective re-signification of living in society, using football as a tool for learning and paradigm shifts.

== Shield ==
Shallon's shield remains the same shape since it was founded in 1991. However, the biggest change was the exchange of colors, from green and yellow to red and black, keeping white, the dove of peace (team mascot), the word PAZ (in capital letters), the full name of the club, the name of the city of Porto Velho and the date of foundation on the shield.

== Stadium ==
Sport Clube Shallon play their home games at Estádio Aluízio Ferreira, a stadium owned by the Porto Velho City Hall, built in 1957 . The stadium has a maximum capacity of 7,000 people. Its formal name honors Aluízio Ferreira, who was the first governor of the former Território Federal do Guaporé (nowadays Rondônia) from 1942 to 1957.

== Titles ==
- Campeonato Rondoniense de Futebol - Segunda Divisão: 1 vice-championship (2008)
