= 1974 in Brazilian football =

Football in Brazil
- Season: 1974

The following article presents a summary of the 1974 football (soccer) season in Brazil, which was the 73rd season of competitive football in the country.

== Campeonato Brasileiro Série A ==
Final Stage

Teams advanced to the final

Position	Team	Points	Played	Won	Drawn	Lost	For	Against	Difference
1	Cruzeiro	4	3	1	2	0	5	3	2
2	Vasco da Gama	4	3	1	2	0	5	4	1
3	Santos	2	3	1	0	2	4	6	-2
4	Internacional	2	3	0	2	1	4	5	-1

Final

August 1, 1974

Vasco da Gama	2–1	Cruzeiro

Maracanã

Vasco da Gama declared as the Campeonato Brasileiro champions.

== State championship champions ==
State	Champion	State	Champion
Acre	Independência	Pará	Remo
Alagoas	CSA	Paraíba	Campinense
Amapá	Macapá	Paraná	Coritiba
Amazonas	Nacional	Pernambuco	Náutico
Bahia	Bahia	Piauí	Tiradentes-PI
Ceará	Fortaleza	Rio de Janeiro	Sapucaia
Distrito Federal	Pioneira	Rio Grande do Norte	América-RN
Espírito Santo	Desportiva	Rio Grande do Sul	Internacional
Goiás	Goiânia	Rondônia	Botafogo-RO
Guanabara	Flamengo	Roraima	São Francisco-RR
Maranhão	Moto Club	Santa Catarina	Figueirense
Mato Grosso	Operário-CG	São Paulo	Palmeiras
Mato Grosso do Sul	-	Sergipe	Sergipe
Minas Gerais	Cruzeiro	Tocantins	-

== Youth competition champions ==
Competition	Champion
Copa São Paulo de Juniores	Internacional

== Brazilian clubs in international competitions ==
Team	Copa Libertadores 1974
Palmeiras	Group stage
São Paulo	Runner-up

== Brazil national team ==
The following table lists all the games played by the Brazil national football team in official competitions and friendly matches during 1974.

Date	Opposition	Result	Score	Brazil scorers	Competition
March 31, 1974	Mexico	D	1-1	Jairzinho	International Friendly
April 7, 1974	Czechoslovakia	W	1-0	Marinho Chagas	International Friendly
April 14, 1974	Bulgaria	W	1-0	Jairzinho	International Friendly
April 17, 1974	Romania	W	2-0	Leivinha, Edu	International Friendly
April 21, 1974	Haiti	W	4-0	Paulo César Caju, Rivellino, Marinho Chagas, Edu	International Friendly
April 28, 1974	Greece	D	0-0	-	International Friendly
May 1, 1974	Austria	D	0-0	-	International Friendly
May 5, 1974	Republic of Ireland	W	2-1	Leivinha, Rivellino	International Friendly
May 12, 1974	Paraguay	W	2-0	Marinho Peres, Rivellino	International Friendly
May 26, 1974	West Germany SW Region Combined Team	W	3-2	Rivellino (2), Valdomiro	International Friendly (unofficial match)
May 30, 1974	(France) Strasbourg	D	1-1	César	International Friendly (unofficial match)
June 3, 1974	(Switzerland) Basel City Combined Team	W	5-2	Rivellino (3), Jairzinho, Valdomiro	International Friendly (unofficial match)
June 13, 1974	Yugoslavia	D	0-0	-	World Cup
June 18, 1974	Scotland	D	0-0	-	World Cup
June 22, 1974	Zaire	W	3-0	Jairzinho, Rivellino, Valdomiro	World Cup
June 26, 1974	East Germany	W	1-0	Rivellino	World Cup
June 30, 1974	Argentina	W	2-1	Rivellino, Jairzinho	World Cup
July 3, 1974	Netherlands	L	0-2	-	World Cup
July 6, 1974	Poland	L	0-1	-	World Cup
