= List of mayors of Porto Velho =

The following is a list of mayors of the city of Porto Velho, in Rondônia state, Brazil.

- Fernando Guapindaia de Souza Brejense, 1915-1917
- Joaquim Augusto Tanajura, 1917-1920
- Raimundo Oliveira, 1920-1922
- Álvaro Maia, 1922-1923
- Joaquim Augusto Tanajura, 1923-1925
- Fernando Corrêa, 1925-1929
- Salustiano Liberato, 1929
- Tófilo Marinho, 1929-1930
- Raimundo Gonzaga Pinheiro, 1930-1931
- Arthur Napoleão Lebre, 1931-1932
- Ariosto Lopes Braga, 1932
- Francisco Plínio Coelho, 1932-1933
- Bohemundo Álvares Afonso, 1933
- José Ferreira Sobrinho, 1933-1938
- Francisco Guedes L. Fonseca, 1938
- Bohemundo Álvares Afonso, 1938-1943
- José Marques Galvão, 1943
- Mário Monteiro, 1943-1946
- Carlos Augusto de Mendonça, 1946-1947
- José Otino de Freitas, 1947-1948
- Celso Pinheiro, 1948
- Flamínio de Júlio de Albuquerque, 1948
- Rui Brasil Cantanhede, 1948-1951
- Rafael Jaime Castiel, 1951
- Balduíno Guedes de Lira, 1951-1954
- José Saleh Moreb, 1954-1955
- Renato Climaco Borralho de Medeiros, 1955-1956
- Walter Montezuma de Oliveira, 1956-1958
- Thomas Miguel Chaquian, 1958
- Rubens Cantanhede, 1958-1961
- Floriano Rodrigues Riva, 1961
- Hamilton Raulino Gondim, 1961-1962
- Homero Martins, 1962-1963
- Odacir Soares, 1963-1965, 1969-1972
- Paulo Trajano de Medeiros, 1965-1967
- Irineu Martins de Farias, 1967
- Hebert Alencar de Souza, 1967
- Hércules Lima de Carvalho, 1967
- Walter Paula de Sales, 1967-1969
- Jacob Freitas Atallah, 1972-1974
- Emanuel Pontes Pinto, 1974-1975
- Antônio Carlos Carpinteiro, 1975-1976
- Luis Gonzaga Farias Ferreira, 1976-1979
- Reditario Cassol, 1979-1985
- José Guedes, 1985-1986, 1993-1996
- Jerônimo Santana, 1986
- Tomaz Corrêa, 1986-1988
- Chiquilito Erse, 1989-1992, 1997-1998
- Carlos Camurça, 1998-2004
- Roberto Eduardo Sobrinho, 2005-2012
- Mauro Nazif, 2013-2016
- Hildon Chaves, 2017-2024
- Léo Moraes, 2025-

== See also ==
- Porto Velho municipal election, 2012
- List of mayors of largest cities in Brazil (in Portuguese)
- List of mayors of capitals of Brazil (in Portuguese)
