= Cruzeiro EC (disambiguation) =

Cruzeiro EC is a Brazilian multisport club based in Belo Horizonte, Minas Gerais state.

Cruzeiro EC or Cruzeiro Esporte Clube may also refer to:

- Cruzeiro Esporte Clube (PB), Brazilian football club based in Itaporanga, Paraíba state
- Cruzeiro Esporte Clube (RO), Brazilian football club based in Porto Velho, Rondônia state

== See also ==
- Esporte Clube Cruzeiro, Brazilian football club based in Porto Alegre, Rio Grande do Sul state
