= Rondoniense Social Clube =

Football club in Porto Velho, Brazil

Rondoniense
- Full name: Rondoniense Social Clube
- Nickname: Periquito da Zona Leste (East Zone Parakeet)
- Founded: 1 March 2010; 16 years ago
- Ground: Aluízio Ferreira
- Capacity: 5,000
- President: Antônio Tadeu de Oliveira
- League: Campeonato Rondoniense Segunda Divisão
- 2025: Rondoniense Segunda Divisão, 2nd of 2
- Website: https://www.rondoniensesc.com.br/
Home colors	Away colors

Rondoniense Social Clube, commonly referred to as Rondoniense (Brazilian Portuguese: [ʁõdoniˈẽjsi]), is a Brazilian football club based in Porto Velho, Rondônia. The club competes in the Campeonato Rondoniense Série A, the top division in the Rondônia state football league system.

Currently, Rondoniense is the seventh-best ranked team from Rondônia in CBF's national club ranking, being placed 238th overall.

== History ==
The club was founded initially in 2007, through an important social project created with the goal of using sports to promote inclusion and social integration of children and adolescents. This project, created and maintained by its founder Antônio Tadeu de Oliveira. The site, which previously served as a recreation for your family, turned into a training center composed of three officers. The project, which before served to promote inclusion and social wellbeing and the modernized only and exclusively social bias and now has a methodology for sports initiation and training of athletes. The club became officially professional on 1 March 2010.

== Stadium ==
Rondoniense play their home games at Estádio Aluízio Ferreira. The stadium has a maximum capacity of 7,000 people.

== Honours ==
- Campeonato Rondoniense
  - Winners (1): 2016
