= Clube de Regatas Flamengo (RO) =

Brazilian football team

Flamengo
- Full name: Clube de Regatas Flamengo
- Nickname: Rubro-Negro do Arigolândia
- Founded: November 15, 1955
- Dissolved: 1994
- Ground: Aluízio Ferreira, Porto Velho, Rondônia, Brazil
- Capacity: 7,000
Home colours	Away colours

Clube de Regatas Flamengo, commonly known as Flamengo, were a Brazilian football team from Porto Velho, Rondônia. They won the Campeonato Rondoniense ten times.

== History ==
They were founded on November 15, 1955. They won the state championship in 1956, 1960, 1961, 1962, 1965, 1966, 1967, 1982, 1983, and in 1985. Flamengo competed three times in the state championship after their professionalization, in 1991, in 1992 and in 1994, when the club folded after finishing in the third position in the league.

== Stadium ==
Flamengo played their home games at Estádio Aluízio Ferreira. The stadium has a maximum capacity of 7,000 people.

== Honours ==
- Campeonato Rondoniense
  - Winners (10): 1956, 1960, 1961, 1962, 1965, 1966, 1967, 1982, 1983, 1985
  - Runners-up (3): 1975, 1981, 1986
