= Ypiranga Esporte Clube =

Brazilian multi-sports club

Ypiranga
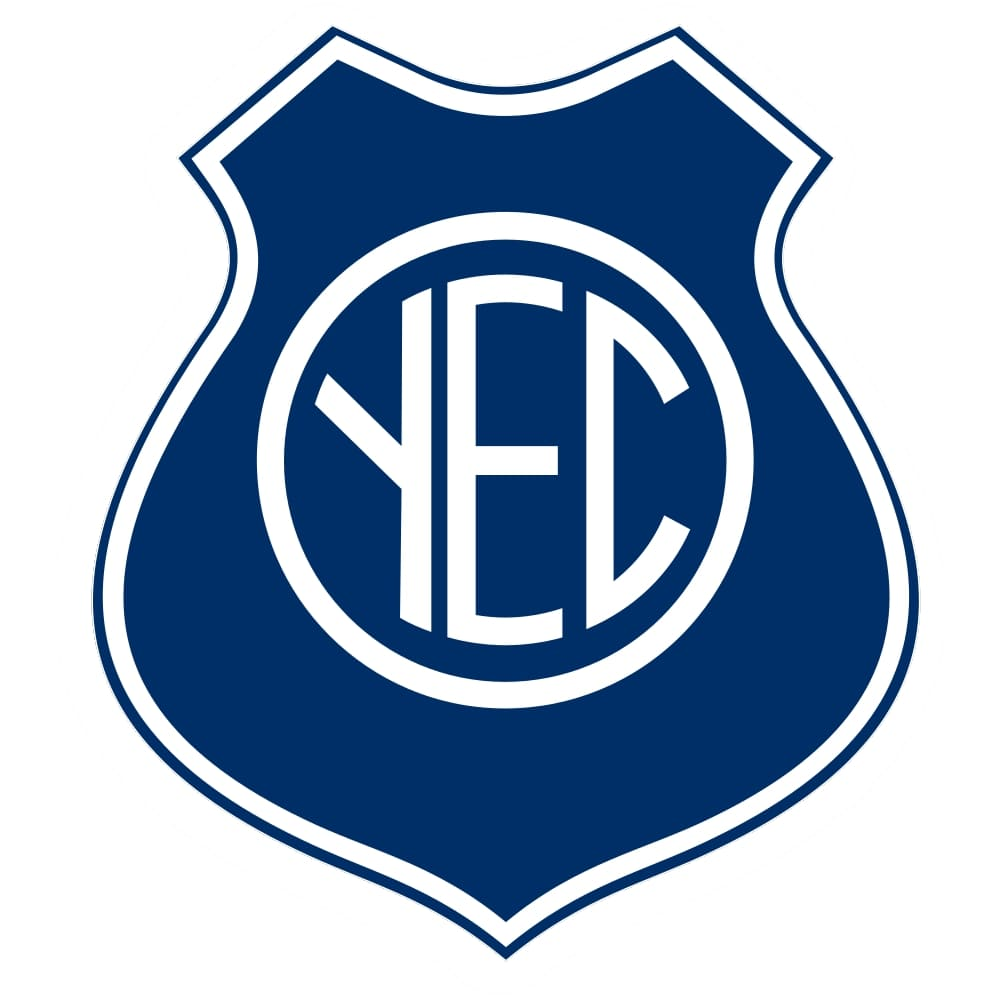
- Full name: Ypiranga Esporte Clube
- Nickname(s): Leão Azul
- Founded: 13 April 1919; 105 years ago
- Stadium: Paulo Saldanha
- Capacity: 3,000
Home colours	Away colours

The Ypiranga Esporte Clube is a Brazilian multi-sports club in the city of Porto Velho, in the state of Rondônia. Its colors are blue and white and the club is considered the oldest clubs in the capital of Rondônia.

== History ==
Founded on April 13, 1919, Ypiranga was one of the greatest forces in Rondônia sport, especially in football in its amateur phase, when it won 5 local tournaments. The club was founded some time after the emancipation of Porto Velho, until then part of the state of Amazonas.

The first president of the new club was the illustrious Dr. Joaquim Augusto Tanajura, who a year after its foundation began occupying a position that today is equivalent to that of mayor of Porto Velho.

=== Graduation from football ===
The club officially graduated from the practice of football in 1987, having obtained five recognized titles from the Campeonato Rondoniense. Since then, only indoor sports and swimming have been maintained.

=== Patrimony ===
In 2018, a new clubhouse was inaugurated, which had a "pool for adults, children's pool, semi-Olympic pool, tennis court, multi-sports court, sand volleyball court, official football field, walking track, playground, kiosks with barbecue, snack bar, as well as space for events". The management at the time planned the club's football return, something that ended up not materializing.

== Rivalries ==
=== Ypiranga vs Ferroviário ===
Ferroviário, Ypiranga's main rival, is Rondônia's biggest football champion and Ypiranga is also one of the main clubs in Porto Velho, which created a great rivalry. The confrontation was called the "Clássico das Multidões" and always attracted the city's large public.

== Honours ==
=== State ===
- Campeonato Rondoniense
  - Winners (5): 1945, 1953, 1959, 1964,1984
  - Runners-up (5): 1951, 1967, 1968, 1976, 1977

=== City ===
- Taça Paulo Saldanha
  - Winners (1): 1925
- Taça Cidade de Porto Velho
  - Winners (1): 1982

== See also ==
- Campeonato Rondoniense
