= 1994 Copa do Brasil =

Copa do Brasil 1994

Tournament details
- Country: Brazil
- Dates: February 18 – August 10
- Teams: 32

Final positions
- Champions: Grêmio (RS)
- Runners-up: Ceará (CE)

Tournament statistics
- Matches played: 62
- Goals scored: 149 (2.4 per match)
- Top goal scorer: Paulinho McLaren (6)

The Copa do Brasil 1994 was the 6th staging of the Copa do Brasil.

The competition started on February 18, 1994, and concluded on August 10, 1994, with the second leg of the final, held at the Estádio Olímpico Monumental in Porto Alegre, in which Grêmio lifted the trophy for the second time with a 1–0 victory over Ceará.

Paulinho McLaren, of Internacional, with 6 goals, was the competition's topscorer.

== Format ==
The competition was disputed by 32 clubs in a knock-out format where all rounds were played in two legs and the away goals rule was used.

== Participating teams ==
- 4 de Julho (PI)
- ABC (RN)
- América (MG)
- Ariquemes (RO)
- Atlético (MG)
- Bahia (BA)
- Campinense (PB)
- Ceará (CE)

- Comercial (MS)
- Corinthians (SP)
- CRB (AL)
- Criciúma (SC)
- Fluminense (RJ)
- Grêmio (RS)
- Independência (AC)
- Internacional (RS)

- Kaburé (TO)
- Linhares (ES)
- Maranhão (MA)
- Nacional (AM)
- Palmeiras (SP)
- Paraná (PR)
- Paysandu (PA)
- Remo (PA)

- Santa Cruz (PE)
- São José (AP)
- Sergipe (SE)
- Sorriso (MT)
- Taguatinga (DF)
- Vasco (RJ)
- Vila Nova (GO)
- Vitória (BA)

== Competition stages ==
1st Round
1	Vitória (BA)	4 1
32	Sorriso (MT)	0 1
17	Ariquemes (RO)	0 2
16	Independência (AC)	1 0
9	CRB (AL)	0 1
24	Corinthians (SP)	1 3
25	Criciúma (SC)	2 1
8	Grêmio (RS)	2 2
5	Atlético (MG)	4 2
28	Vila Nova (GO)	3 0
21	Remo (PA)	1 3
12	Maranhão (MA)	1 0
13	Sergipe (SE)	1 1 (pen: 2)
20	Santa Cruz (PE)	1 1 (pen: 4)
29	ABC (RN)	0 1
4	Vasco (RJ)	2 1
3	Fluminense (RJ)	2 1
30	Linhares (ES)	2 1
19	Nacional (AM)	1 1
14	São José (AP)	2 2
11	Paysandu (PA)	0 0 (pen: 5)
22	Comercial (MS)	0 0 (pen: 6)
27	Kaburé (TO)	2 0
6	América (MG)	0 1
7	Internacional (RS)	1 1
26	Paraná (PR)	1 0
23	Taguatinga (DF)	0 1
10	Bahia (BA)	2 2
15	Ceará (CE)	2 1
18	Campinense (PB)	0 2
31	4 de Julho (PI)	1 2
2	Palmeiras (SP)	3 5

2nd Round
Vitória (BA)	2 3
Ariquemes (RO)	0 0
Corinthians (SP)	0 2
Grêmio (RS)	2 2
Remo (PA)	2 0
Atlético (MG)	1 2
Santa Cruz (PE)	1 1
Vasco (RJ)	0 3
Linhares (ES)	0 3
São José (AP)	0 2
Comercial (MS)	2 2
Kaburé (TO)	0 0
Internacional (RS)	1 4
Bahia (BA)	0 5
Ceará (CE)	0 1
Palmeiras (SP)	0 1

Quarterfinals
Vitória (BA)	0 0
Grêmio (RS)	1 1
Vasco (RJ)	3 4
Atlético (MG)	1 3
Linhares (ES)	1 1
Comercial (MS)	0 1
Ceará (CE)	1 1
Internacional (RS)	0 2

Semifinals
Grêmio (RS)	0 2
Vasco (RJ)	0 1
Linhares (ES)	0 0
Ceará (CE)	1 0

Finals
Grêmio (RS)	0 1
Ceará (CE)	0 0

Copa do Brasil
1994 Winners
Grêmio
Second Title
