= Porto Velho Air Force Base =

Air base of the Brazilian Air Force

- Base Aérea de Porto Velho
- Porto Velho, Rondônia in Brazil
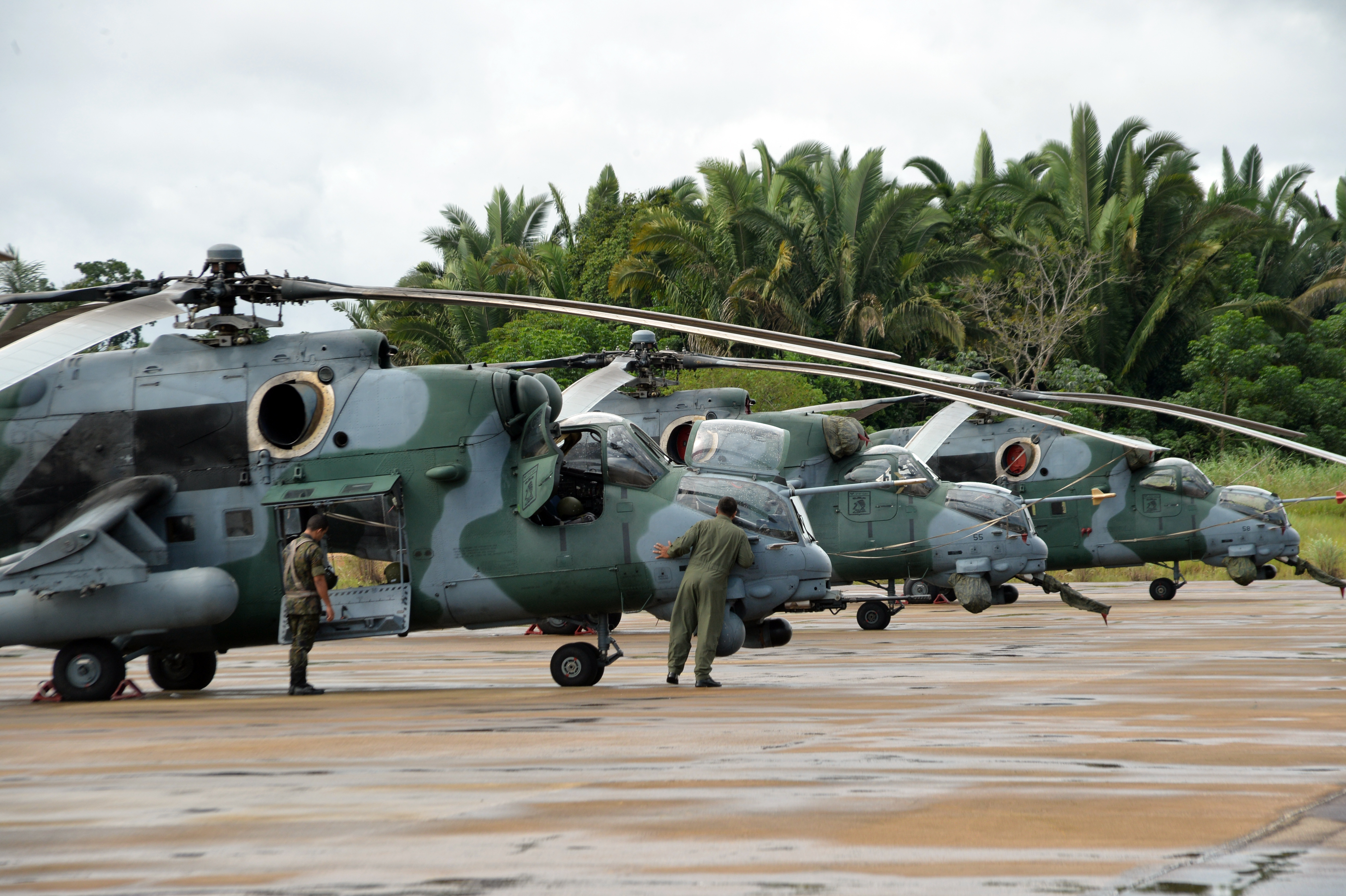
- A line of AH-2 Sabre at Porto Velho in 2015.

Site information
- Type: Air Force Base
- Code: ALA6
- Owner: Brazilian Air Force
- Controlled by: Brazilian Air Force
- Open to the public: No
- Website: www.fab.mil.br/organizacoes/mostra/509

Location
- Location in Brazil SBPV (Brazil)
- Coordinates: 08°42′49″S 063°54′10″W

Site history
- Built: 1969
- In use: 1984-present

Garrison information
- Current commander: Ten. Cel. Av. Jason Sakai
- Occupants: 2nd Squadron of the 3rd Aviation Group; 2nd Squadron of the 8th Aviation Group; 5th Squadron of the 1st Communications and Control Group

Airfield information
- Identifiers: IATA: PVH, ICAO: SBPV, LID: RO0001
- Elevation: 90 metres (295 ft) AMSL
Runways
Direction	Length and surface
01/19	2,400 metres (7,874 ft) Asphalt

Porto Velho Air Force Base – ALA6 (IATA: PVH, ICAO: SBPV) is a base of the Brazilian Air Force, located in Porto Velho, Brazil.

It shares some facilities with Gov. Jorge Teixeira de Oliveira International Airport.

== History ==
Porto Velho Air Force Base was commissioned on 31 October 1984.

== Units ==
The following units are based at Porto Velho Air Force Base:

- 2nd Squadron of the 3rd Aviation Group (2º/3ºGAv) Grifo, using the A-29A & B Super Tucano.
- 2nd Squadron of the 8th Aviation Group (2°/8°GAv) Poti, using the Mil AH-2 Sabre. In August 2022 it was announced that all 12 aircraft will be decommissioned and stored.
- 5th Squadron of the 1st Communications and Control Group (5º/1ºGCC) Zagal, using radars and equipment for air defense.

== Access ==
The base is located 7 km from downtown Porto Velho.

== Gallery ==
This gallery displays aircraft that are or have been based at Porto Velho. The gallery is not comprehensive.

=== Present aircraft ===
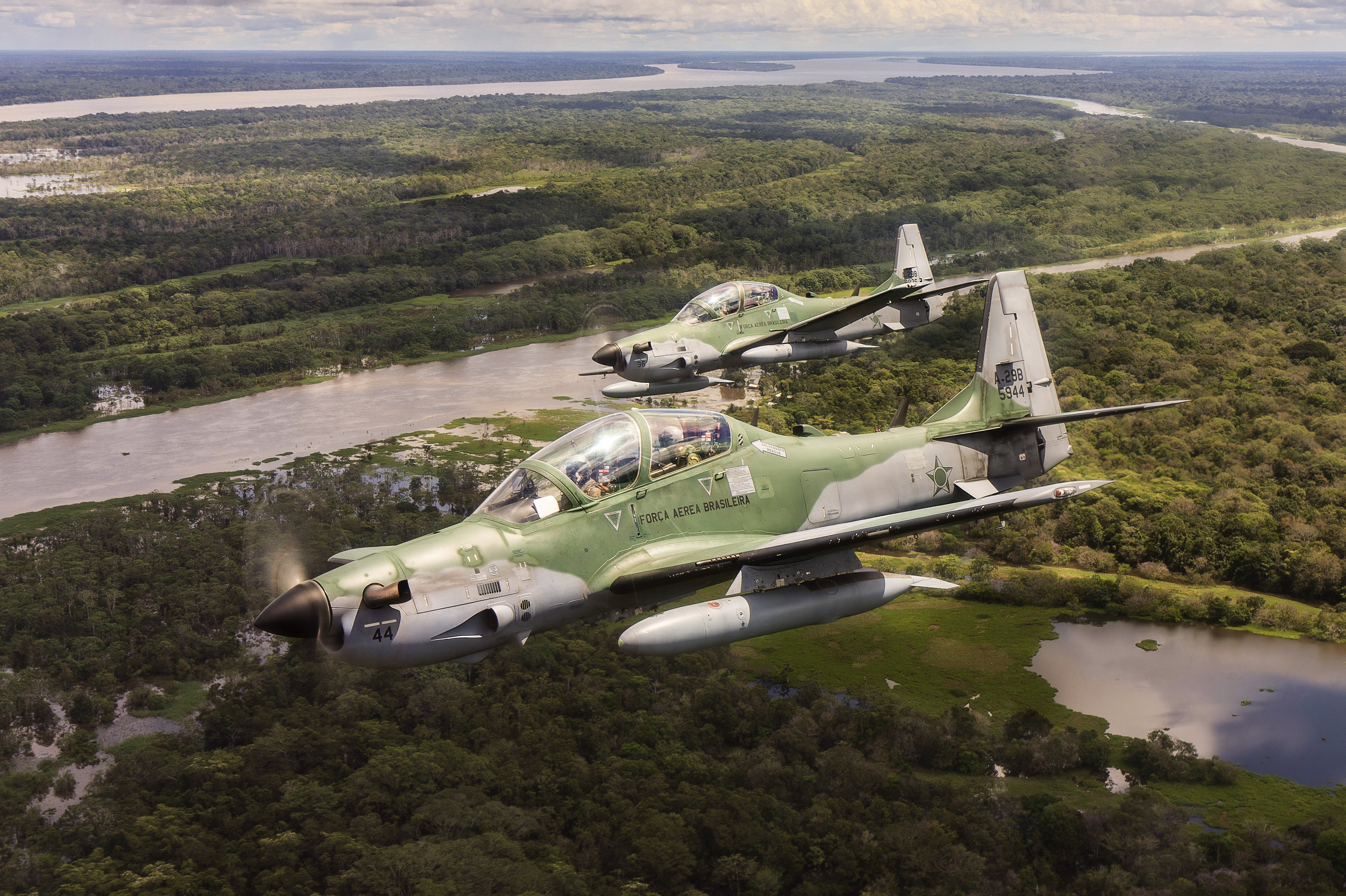
Embraer A-29A Super Tucano

=== Retired aircraft ===
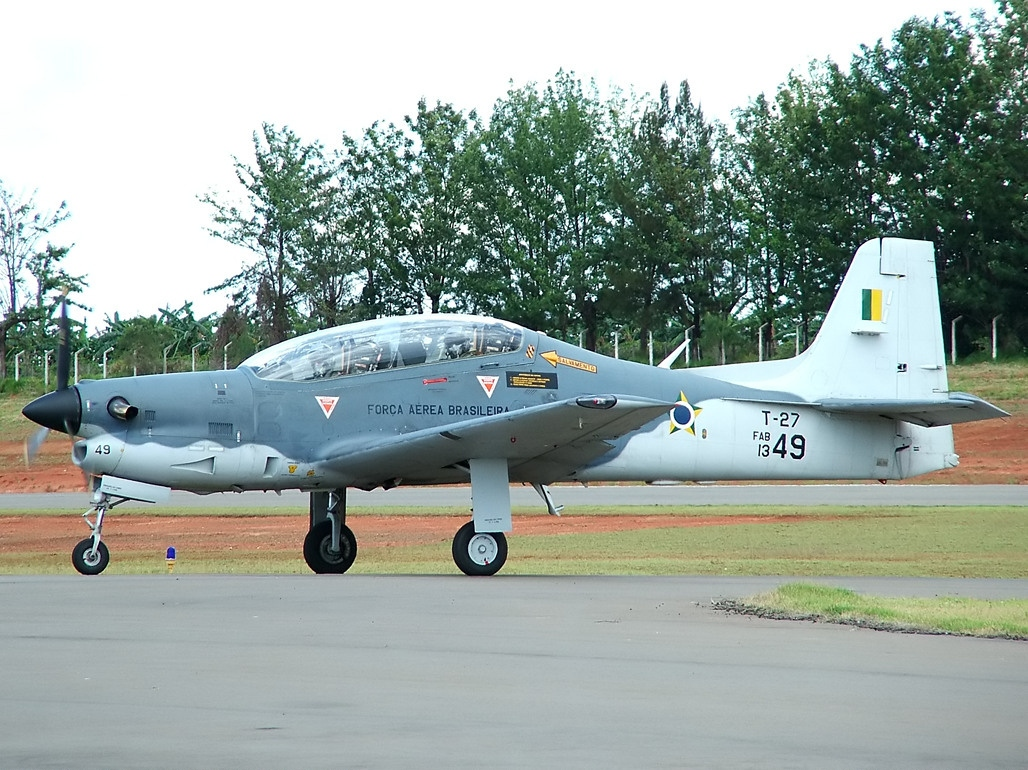
Embraer T-27 Tucano

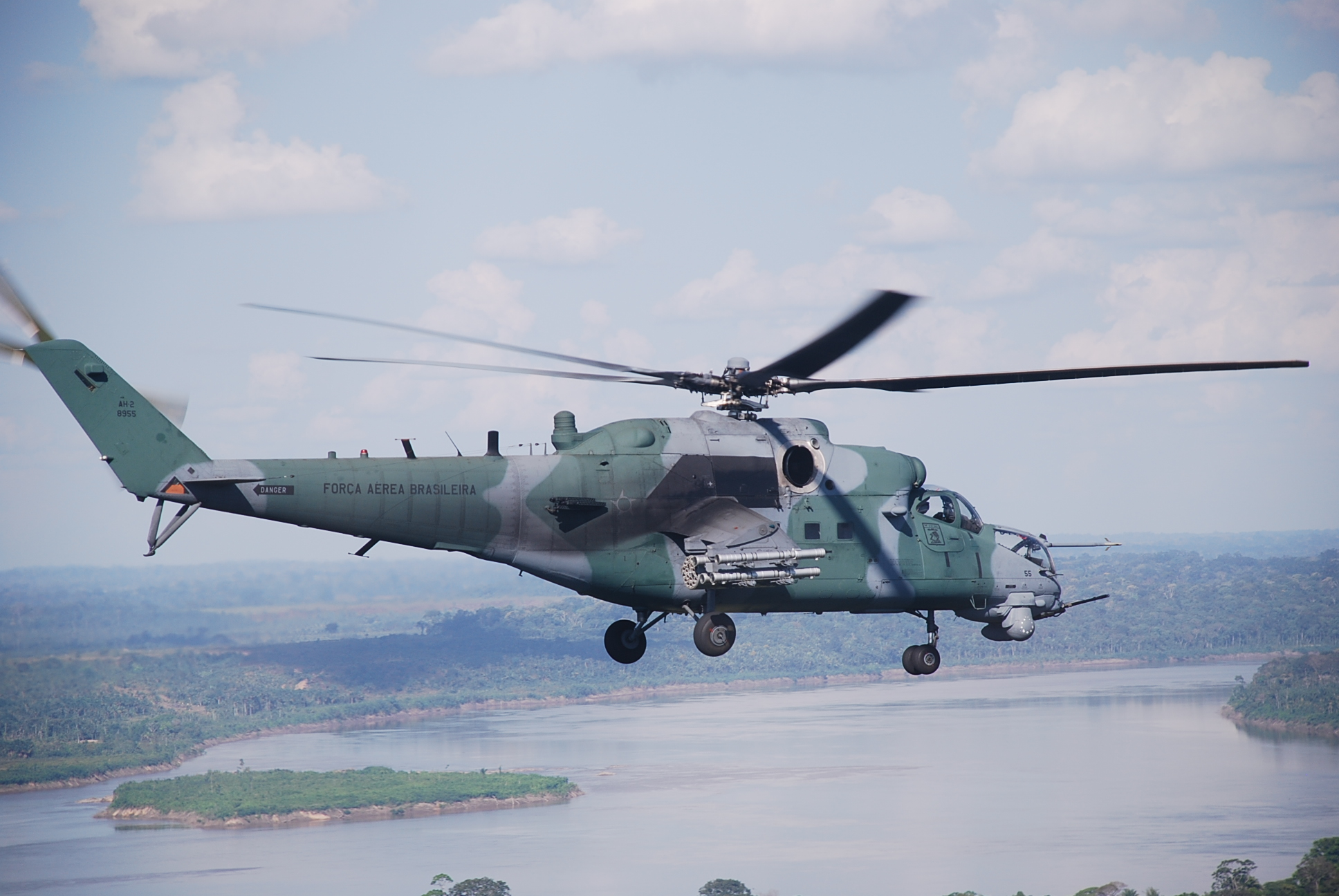
Mil AH-2 Sabre

== See also ==
- List of Brazilian military bases
- Governador Jorge Teixeira de Oliveira International Airport
