= Moto Esporte Clube =

Football club in Porto Velho, Brazil

Moto Clube
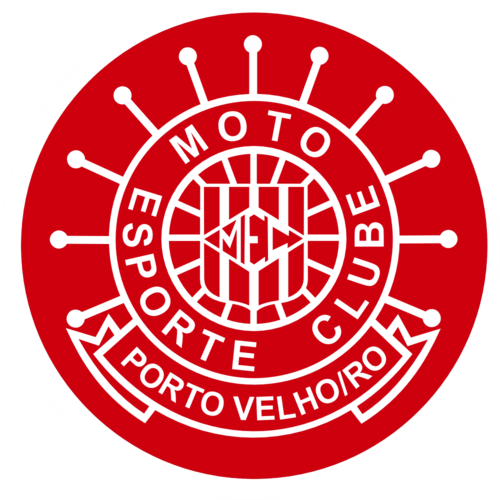
- Full name: Moto Esporte Clube
- Nickname(s): Timão; Moto
- Founded: 13 May 1952; 72 years ago
- Ground: Aluízio Ferreira
- Capacity: 5,000
- 2012: Rondoniense, 6th of 8
- Website: http://motoesporteclube.com
Home colours	Away colours	colours

Moto Esporte Clube, commonly referred to as Moto Clube (Brazilian Portuguese: [mɔtoˈklubi]), is a currently inactive Brazilian football club based in Porto Velho, Rondônia. They won the Campeonato Rondoniense ten times and the Torneio de Integração da Amazônia twice.

== History ==
The club was founded on 13 May 1952. Moto Clube won the Campeonato Rondoniense in 1954, 1968, 1969, 1971, 1972, 1975, 1976, 1977, 1980, and in 1981, and won the Torneio de Integração da Amazônia in 1977 and 1978.

== Honours ==
=== Regional ===
- Torneio de Integração da Amazônia
  - Winners (2): 1977, 1978

=== State ===
- Campeonato Rondoniense
  - Winners (10): 1954, 1968, 1969, 1971, 1972, 1975, 1976, 1977, 1980, 1981
  - Runners-up (1): 1973
- Campeonato Rondoniense Second Division
  - Winners (1): 2009

== Stadium ==
Moto Esporte Clube played their home games at Estádio Aluízio Ferreira. The stadium has a maximum capacity of 4,000 people.
