= Governador Jorge Teixeira de Oliveira International Airport =

Airport serving Porto Velho, Brazil

Porto Velho–Governador Jorge Teixeira de Oliveira International Airport Aeroporto Internacional de Porto Velho–Governador Jorge Teixeira de Oliveira
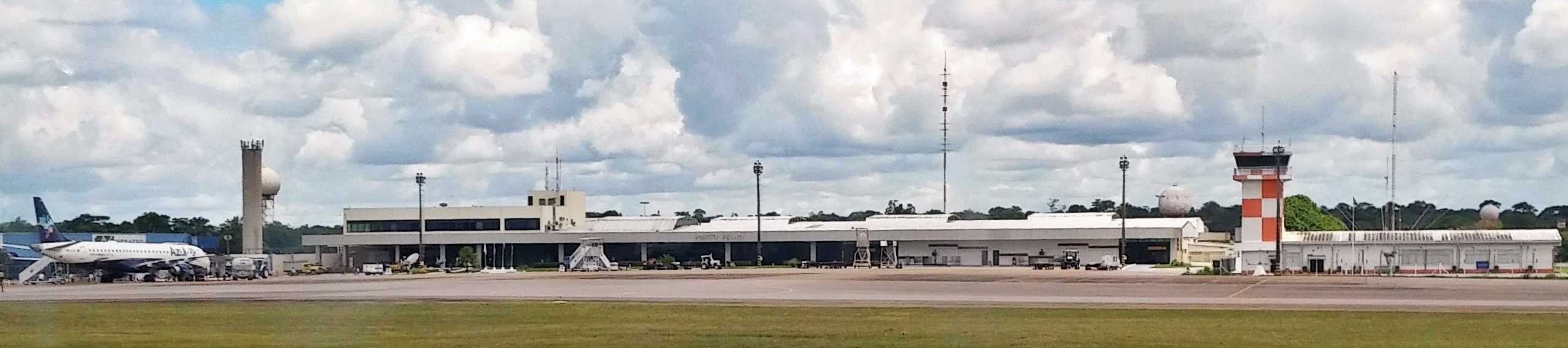
- IATA: PVH; ICAO: SBPV; LID: RO0001

Summary
- Airport type: Public / Military
- Operator: Infraero (1979–2021); Vinci (2021–present)
- Serves: Porto Velho
- Opened: 16 April 1969; 57 years ago
- Time zone: BRT−1 (UTC−04:00)
- Elevation AMSL: 90 m (300 ft)
- Coordinates: 08°42′49″S 063°54′10″W
- Website: www.portovelho-airport.com.br

Map
- Location in Brazil PVH (Brazil)

Runways
Direction	Length		Surface
Direction	m	ft	Surface
01/19	2,400	7,874	Asphalt

Statistics (2025)
- Passengers: 656,163 ▲34%
- Aircraft operations: 10,646 ▲12%
- Statistics: Vinci; Sources: Airport website, ANAC, DECEA

Porto Velho–Governador Jorge Teixeira de Oliveira International Airport (IATA: PVH, ICAO: SBPV), also called Belmonte Airport referring to the neighborhood where it is located, is an airport serving Porto Velho, Brazil. Since 3 July 2002, the airport has been named after Jorge Teixeira de Oliveira (1922-1987), the first Governor of the State of Rondônia.

The airport is operated by Vinci SA.

Some of its facilities are shared with the Porto Velho Air Force Base of the Brazilian Air Force.

== History ==
The airport was opened on 16 April 1969 as a replacement for Caiari Airport, which was then closed. The airport was operated by Infraero between 1979 and 2021. In 2002 it was granted international status.

Previously operated by Infraero, on 7 April 2021 Vinci SA won a 30-year concession to operate the airport.

== Airlines and destinations ==
Airlines	Destinations
Azul Brazilian Airlines	Belo Horizonte–Confins, Cuiabá, Manaus
Azul Conecta	Lábrea, Pimenta Bueno
Gol Linhas Aéreas	Brasília, Cuiabá (ends 30 January 2027), Manaus, Rio Branco (ends 31 January 2027)
LATAM Brasil	Brasília, São Paulo–Guarulhos

== Statistics ==
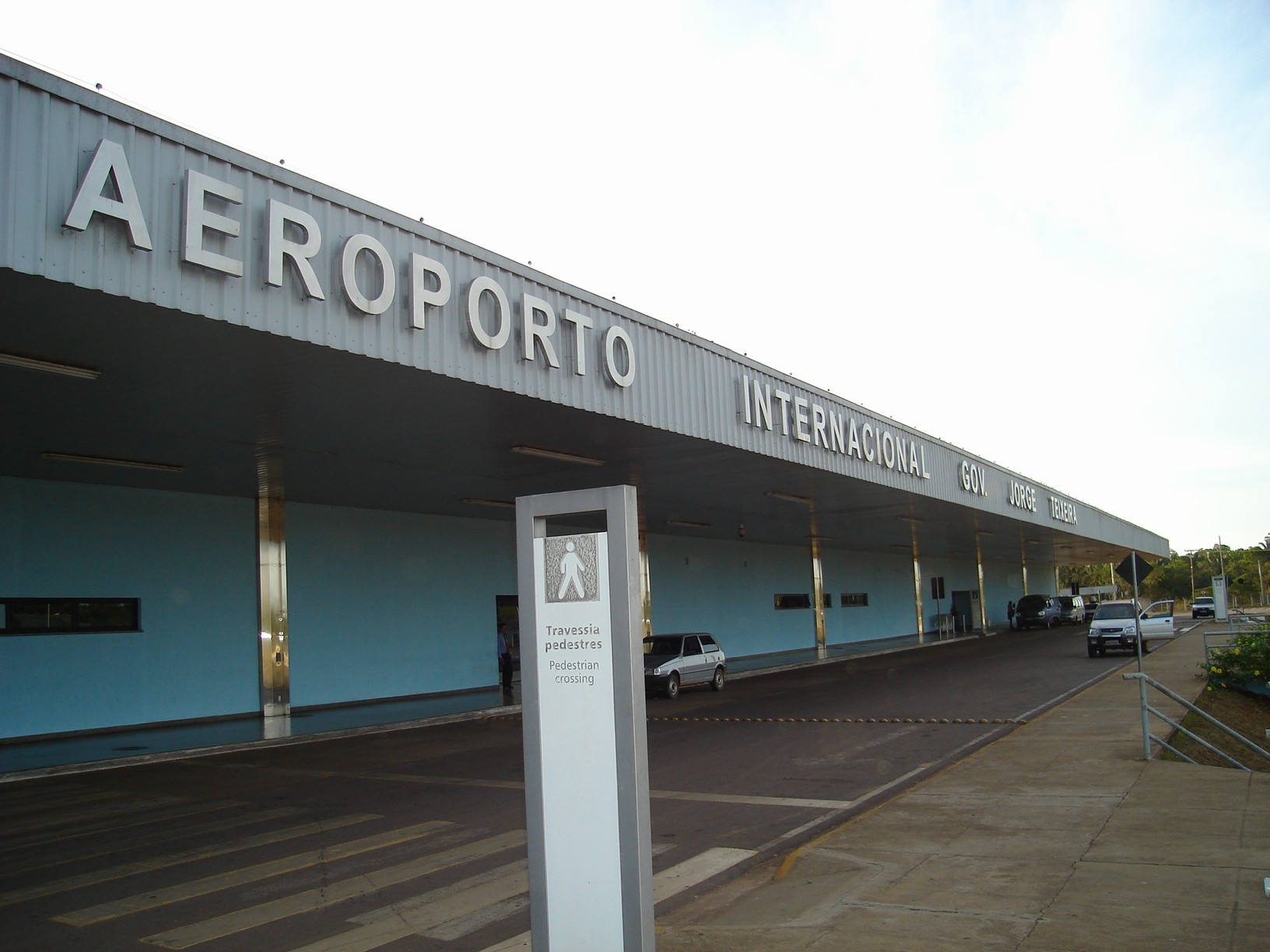
Terminal land side in 2006

Following are the number of passenger, aircraft and cargo movements at the airport, according to Infraero (2007-2021) and Vinci (2022-2025) reports:

Year	Passenger	Aircraft	Cargo (t)
2025	656,163 ▲34%	10,646 ▲12%	
2024	489,920 ▼16%	9,498 ▼18%	
2023	583,342 ▼20%	11,637 ▼17%	
2022	731,716 ▲10%	14,022 ▲50%	
2021	665,282 ▲46%	9,355 ▲27%	2,378 ▲21%
2020	455,113 ▼40%	7,375 ▼28%	1,963 ▼43%
2019	753,305 ▼9%	10,239 ▼27%	3,418 ▲2%
2018	828,139 ▲4%	13,973 ▲6%	3,360 ▲63%
2017	794,109 ▼5%	13,128 ▼9%	2,067 ▲7%
2016	840,026 ▼10%	14,352 ▼12%	1,932 ▼25%
2015	933,666 ▲5%	16,358 ▼8%	2,591 ▲24%
2014	892,760 ▼1%	17,732 ▲1%	2,088 ▲7%
2013	905,958 ▼14%	17,578 ▼16%	1,947 ▼35%
2012	1,050,682 ▲7%	20,944 ▼4%	2,986 ▼39%
2011	983,812 ▲37%	21,815 ▲22%	4,912 ▲38%
2010	716,905 ▲28%	17,809 ▲26%	3,569 ▼24%
2009	561,331 ▲32%	14,098 ▲26%	4,717 ▼21%
2008	426,470 ▲9%	11,230 ▲3%	5,962 ▲182%
2007	391,179	10,927	2,113

== Access ==
The airport is located 7 km (4 mi) from downtown Porto Velho.

== See also ==
- List of airports in Brazil
- Porto Velho Air Force Base
