= Sociedade Esportiva Ariquemes =

Ariquemes
- Full name: Sociedade Esportiva Ariquemes
- Nickname(s): Auriverde do Vale do Jamari
- Founded: April 11, 1981
- Dissolved: 2008
- Ground: Valerião, Ariquemes, Rondônia state, Brazil
- Capacity: 5,000
Home colours	Away colours

Sociedade Esportiva Ariquemes, commonly known as Ariquemes, was a Brazilian football club based in Ariquemes, Rondônia state. They competed in the Copa do Brasil once.

== History ==
The club was founded on October 2, 1981. Ariquemes won the Campeonato Rondoniense in 1993 and in 1994. They competed in the Copa do Brasil in 1994, when they were eliminated in the Second Stage by Vitória. The club eventually folded.

== Honours ==
- Campeonato Rondoniense
  - Winners (2): 1993, 1994
  - Runners-up (1): 1996

== Stadium ==
Sociedade Esportiva Ariquemes played their home games at Estádio Gentil Valério, nicknamed Valerião. The stadium has a maximum capacity of 5,000 people.
