= Botafogo Futebol Clube (RO) =

Brazilian association football club

Botafogo
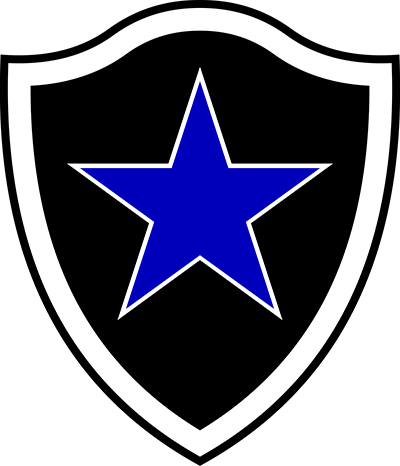
- Full name: Botafogo Futebol Clube
- Nickname(s): Estrela Azul
- Founded: 3 October 1953; 71 years ago
- Stadium: Aluízio Ferreira
- Capacity: 7,000
- Website: https://www.instagram.com/botafogopvh/?hl=en
Home colours	Away colours

The Botafogo Futebol Clube sometimes known as Botafogo Futebol Clube de Porto Velho is a Brazilian association football club based in the city of Porto Velho, in the state of Rondônia. Its colors are black, white and blue and was founded in October 1953.

== Honors ==
- Campeonato Rondoniense (1): 1974

== See also ==
- Botafogo de Futebol e Regatas
- Campeonato Rondoniense
