= Aluizão =

Stadium in Porto Velho, Brazil

Estádio Aluízio Ferreira
- Aluizão
- Interactive map of Estádio Aluízio Ferreira
- Full name: Estádio Aluízio Ferreira
- Location: Porto Velho, Rondônia, Brazil
- Coordinates: 8°45′26″S 63°54′38″W
- Owner: Governo de Rondônia
- Capacity: 7,000
- Surface: Grass
- Field size: 90 x 75m

Construction
- Opened: 17 May 1957

Tenants
- Ferroviário-RO (1957–1990); Flamengo-RO (1957–1991); CF Amazônia; Cruzeiro EC; Porto Velho EC; SC Genus de Porto Velho; SC Shallon; Moto EC; Rondoniense SC

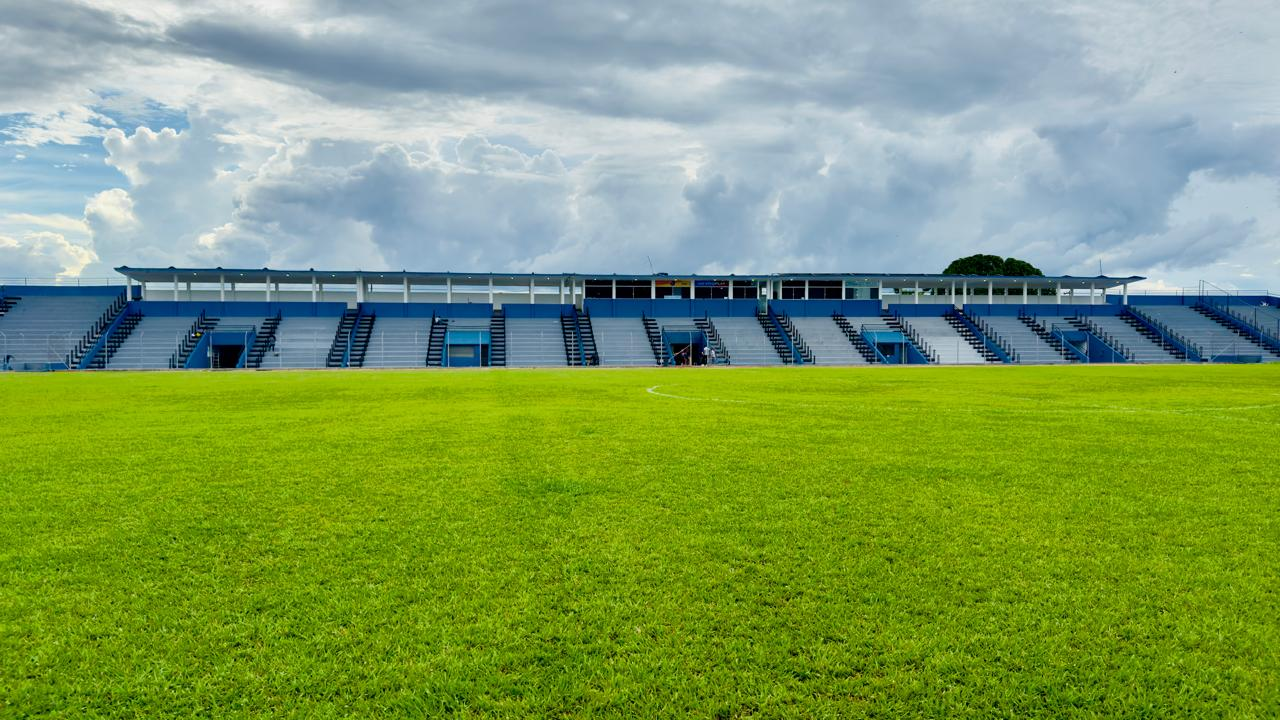
Aluízio Ferreira Stadium

Estádio Aluízio Ferreira, usually known as Estádio Aluízio Ferreira and nicknamed Aluizão, is a football stadium located in Porto Velho, Rondônia state, Brazil. The stadium is owned by the Governo de Rondônia and it was built in 1957. Its formal name honors Aluízio Ferreira, who was the first governor of the former Território Federal do Guaporé (nowadays Rondônia) from 1942 to 1957.

== History ==
The stadium construction concluded in 1957. The inaugural match was played on May 17 of that year, when Ferroviário-RO beat Flamengo-RO 3–1. The first goal of the stadium was scored by Flamengo's Nezio.

On August 22, 1965, Bahia beat Ypiranga-RO 9–1, which was the stadium's highest score at the time.

The stadium's attendance record currently stands at 7,427, set on February 27, 1995, when Botafogo beat Ji-Paraná 3–1.

On June 10, 2001, the new stadium's highest score was set, when Genus beat Shallon 13–0.
