= Cruzeiro Esporte Clube (RO) =

Cruzeiro
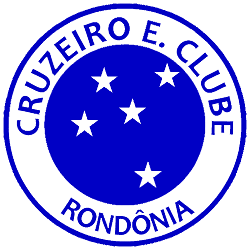
- Full name: Cruzeiro Esporte Clube
- Nickname(s): Ruy Barbosa
- Founded: 1 May 1963; 61 years ago
- Dissolved: 2018; 7 years ago
- Ground: Aluizão
- Capacity: 5,000
- 2010: Rondoniense, 8th of 8
Home colours	Away colours

Cruzeiro Esporte Clube, commonly referred to as Cruzeiro de Rondônia, or simply Cruzeiro-RO, was (Note: As of 2018, the club's CNPJ is listed as inapt.) a Brazilian professional football club based in Porto Velho, Rondônia. They competed in the Copa Norte once in 1999. Their activities are currently closed due to financial difficulties. Cruzeiro-RO has last played in a professional match in May 2010.

== History ==
The club was founded on 1 May 1963. They competed in the Copa Norte in 1999, finishing as the fourth place of the cup after being defeated in the semi-finals by São Raimundo of Amazonas state.

== Stadium ==
Cruzeiro Esporte Clube played their home games at Estádio Aluízio Ferreira. The stadium has a maximum capacity of 7,000 people.

== Achievements ==
- Campeonato Rondoniense
  - 2x runners-up: 1996, 1998
- Copa Norte
  - 1x finalists: 1999
