= 2001 Copa do Brasil =

Copa do Brasil 2001

Tournament details
- Country: Brazil
- Dates: March 14 - June 17
- Teams: 64

Final positions
- Champions: Grêmio (RS)
- Runners-up: Corinthians (SP)

Tournament statistics
- Top goal scorer: Washington Stecanela (12)

The Copa do Brasil 2001 was the 13th staging of the Copa do Brasil.

The competition started on March 14, 2001 and concluded on June 13, 2001 with the second leg of the final, held at the Estádio do Morumbi in São Paulo, in which Grêmio lifted the trophy for the fourth time with a 3-1 victory over Corinthians.

Washington, of Ponte Preta, with 12 goals, was the competition's topscorer.

== Format ==
The competition was disputed by 64 clubs in a knock-out format where all rounds were played over two legs and the away goals rule was used, but in the first two rounds if the away team won the first leg with an advantage of at least two goals, the second leg was not played and the club automatically qualified to the next round.

== Competition stages ==
1st Round
1	River (PI)	0
64	Flamengo (RJ)	2
33	Náutico (PE)	2 0
32	ABC (RN)	2 2
17	URT (MG)	2 0
48	Mixto (MT)	1 2
49	Comercial (MS)	2 0
16	Juventude (RS)	0 5
9	Desportiva (ES)	2 0
56	Coritiba (PR)	3 3
41	Nacional (AM)	3 1
24	Paysandú (PA)	0 1
25	Operário (MS)	0
40	Atlético (MG)	6
57	Americano (RJ)	2
8	Goiás (GO)	6
5	Cachoeiro (ES)	0 1
60	Fluminense (RJ)	1 2
37	Malutrom (PR)	1 0
28	Juventude (MT)	0 4
21	Villa Nova (MG)	3 1
44	Grêmio (RS)	2 4
53	Lagartense (SE)	1 3
12	Santa Cruz (PE)	2 3
13	Guajará (RO)	1 0
52	Rio Branco (AC)	1 1
45	ASA (AL)	1 1
20	Vitória (BA)	2 2
29	Ceará (CE)	3 2
36	Paraná (PR)	1 2
61	Botafogo (PB)	0 0
4	São Paulo (SP)	1 10
3	Joinville (SC)	1
62	Corinthians (SP)	3
35	Goiânia (GO)	1 1
30	América (MG)	1 0
19	CSA (AL)	3 1
46	Sport (PE)	4 0
51	Moto Clube (MA)	1 1
14	Flamengo (PI)	2 2
11	Figueirense (SC)	2 1
54	Portuguesa (SP)	3 2
43	Rio Negro (RR)	1 0
22	São Raimundo (AM)	2 6
27	Caxias (RS)	0 1
38	Guarani (SP)	1 4
59	Treze (PB)	2 0 (pen: 2)
6	Atlético (PR)	0 2 (pen: 3)
7	Vila Nova (GO)	3 1
58	Internacional (RS)	3 3
39	Sampaio Corrêa (MA)	0
26	Fortaleza (CE)	2
23	América (RN)	1
42	Bahia (BA)	4
55	Anapolina (GO)	1 1
10	Santos (SP)	2 5
15	Sergipe (SE)	2 1
50	Botafogo (RJ)	3 2
47	Remo (PA)	1 3
18	Santos (AP)	0 0
31	Palmas (TO)	0 0
34	Gama (DF)	0 2
63	Castanhal (PA)	0 1
2	Ponte Preta (SP)	1 8

2nd Round
Flamengo (RJ)	3
ABC (RN)	1
Mixto (MT)	0 1
Juventude (RS)	3 1
Coritiba (PR)	2 2
Nacional (AM)	2 1
Atlético (MG)	1 2
Goiás (GO)	3 2
Fluminense (RJ)	1 3
Juventude (MT)	4 0
Grêmio (RS)	0 3
Santa Cruz (PE)	1 1
Rio Branco (AC)	0 0
Vitória (BA)	0 3
Ceará (CE)	2
São Paulo (SP)	4
Corinthians (SP)	1 3
Goiânia (GO)	0 1
Sport (PE)	0 1
Flamengo (PI)	2 0
Portuguesa (SP)	0 3
São Raimundo (AM)	1 1
Guarani (SP)	0
Atlético (PR)	2
Internacional (RS)	0 0
Fortaleza (CE)	1 0
Bahia (BA)	2 2
Santos (SP)	0 0
Botafogo (RJ)	1 1
Remo (PA)	2 2
Gama (DF)	0 0
Ponte Preta (SP)	0 2

3rd Round
Flamengo (RJ)	2 1 (pen: 3)
Juventude (RS)	1 2 (pen: 2)
Coritiba (PR)	1 4
Goiás (GO)	1 3
Fluminense (RJ)	0 0
Grêmio (RS)	1 0
Vitória (BA)	0 0
São Paulo (SP)	3 2
Corinthians (SP)	8 3
Flamengo (PI)	1 0
Portuguesa (SP)	1 1
Atlético (PR)	3 1
Fortaleza (CE)	0 3
Bahia (BA)	0 0
Remo (PA)	3 2
Ponte Preta (SP)	2 4

Quarterfinals
Flamengo (RJ)	2 1
Coritiba (PR)	3 1
Grêmio (RS)	2 4
São Paulo (SP)	1 3
Corinthians (SP)	0 1
Atlético (PR)	0 0
Fortaleza (CE)	1 2
Ponte Preta (SP)	0 5

Semifinals
Coritiba (PR)	1 0
Grêmio (RS)	3 1
Corinthians (SP)	2 3
Ponte Preta (SP)	0 0

Finals
Grêmio (RS)	2 3
Corinthians (SP)	2 1

Copa do Brasil
2001 Winners
Grêmio
Fourth Title
