= Guajará Esporte Clube =

Football club in Guajará-Mirim, Brazil

Guajará
- Full name: Guajará Esporte Clube
- Nickname(s): GEC; O Glorioso
- Founded: 31 October 1952; 72 years ago
- Ground: João Saldanha
- Capacity: 3,000
- 2020: Rondoniense, 11th of 11
Home colors	Away colors

Guajará Esporte Clube, commonly referred to as Guajará (Brazilian Portuguese: [ɡwaʒaˈɾa]), is a Brazilian football club based in Guajará-Mirim, Rondônia. The club's senior team is inactive since 2020.

They competed in the Copa do Brasil once.

== History ==
The club was founded on October 31, 1952. Guajará won the Campeonato Rondoniense in 2000. The club competed in the Copa do Brasil in 2001, when they were eliminated in the First Stage by Rio Branco.

== Achievements ==
- Campeonato Rondoniense:
  - Winners (1): 2000

== Stadium ==
Guajará Esporte Clube play their home games at Estádio João Saldanha. The stadium has a maximum capacity of 5,000 people.
