= Clube de Futebol da Amazônia =

Brazilian football club

CFA
- Full name: Clube de Futebol da Amazônia
- Founded: 17 January 2001; 24 years ago
- Dissolved: 2008; 17 years ago
- Ground: Estádio Aluízio Ferreira, Porto Velho, Rondônia state, Brazil
- Capacity: 7,000
Home colours	Away colours

Clube de Futebol da Amazônia, commonly known as CFA, was a Brazilian football club based in Porto Velho, Rondônia state. They competed in the Série C and in the Copa do Brasil once.

== History ==
The club was founded on January 17, 2001. CFA won the Campeonato Rondoniense in 2002, and the Torneio de Integração da Amazônia in 2003. The club competed in the Copa do Brasil in 2003, when they were eliminated in the Second Round by Bahia, after defeating Rio Branco-AC in the First Round. They competed in the Série C in 2003, when they were eliminated in the First Stage of the competition.

== Honours ==
=== Regional ===
- Torneio de Integração da Amazônia
  - Winners (1): 2003

=== State ===
- Campeonato Rondoniense
  - Winners (1): 2002

== Stadium ==
Clube de Futebol da Amazônia played their home games at Estádio Aluízio Ferreira. The stadium has a maximum capacity of 7,000 people.
