= Porto Velho =

Capital city of Rondônia, Brazil

- Municipality
- Município de Porto Velho; Municipality of Porto Velho
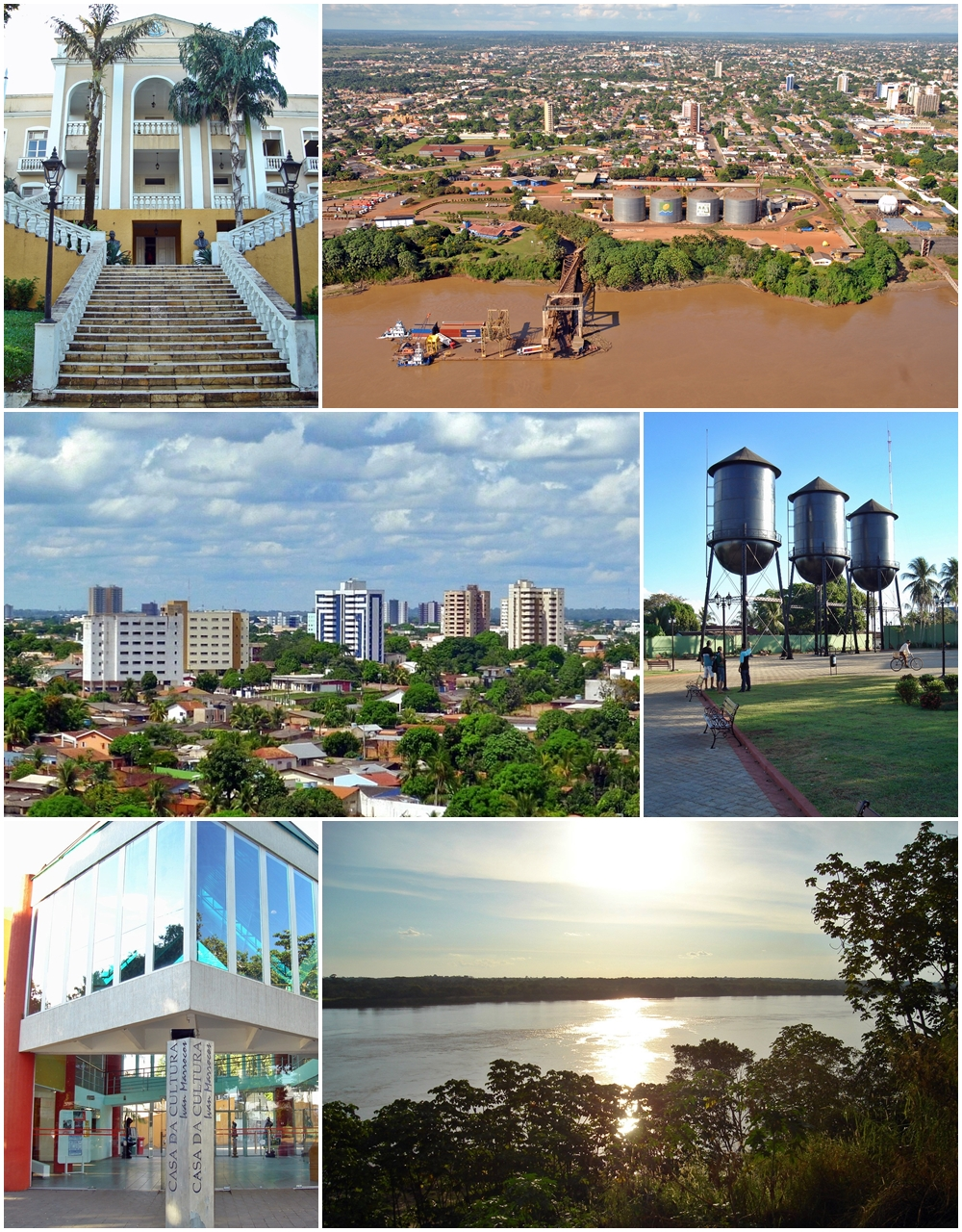
- Top left:Rondônia State Government Office, Top right:Port of Porto Velho, Middle left:Porto Velho Cultural House, Middle right:Sunset in Madeira River, Bottom:Panorama view of downtown from Pedrinhas area

- Flag Coat of arms

- Location of Porto Velho in the State of Rondônia

- Localization of Porto Velho in Brazil
- Coordinates: 8°45′43″S 63°54′14″W
- Country: Brazil
- Region: North
- State: Rondônia
- Founded: October 2, 1914

Government
  - Mayor: Léo Moraes (Podemos)

Area
  - Total: 34,082.37 km^{2} (13,159.28 sq mi)
- Elevation: 83 m (272 ft)

Population (2025)
  - Total: 517,709
  - Density: 15.1899/km^{2} (39.3418/sq mi)
- Demonym: porto-velhense
- Time zone: UTC−4 (AMT)
- Postal code: 76800-001 to 76849-999
- Area code: +55 69
- HDI (2010): 0.736 – high
- Website: www.portovelho.ro.gov.br

Porto Velho (Portuguese pronunciation: [ˈpoʁtu ˈvɛʎu], Old Port) is the capital of the Brazilian state of Rondônia, in the upper Amazon River basin. The population is 460,434 people (as of the IBGE 2022 estimation). Located on the border of Rondônia and the state of Amazonas, the town is an important trading center for cassiterite, the mining of tin, which represents the most important economic activity in the region, as well as a transportation and communication center. It is on the eastern shore of the Madeira River, one of the main tributaries of the Amazon River. It is also Rondônia's largest city, and the largest state capital of Brazil by area.

The municipality occupies most of the border between Amazonas and Rondônia, and is both the westernmost and northernmost city in the state.

== History ==
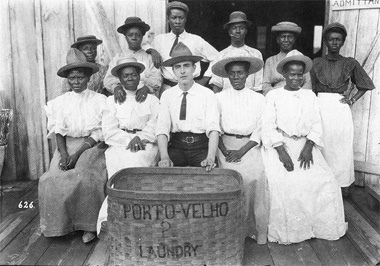
This photograph shows an American laundry boss and his "Barbadian" workers, a term used generally to refer to Caribbean immigrants. The laundry in Porto Velho had a steam press, regarded as something of a luxury at the time.

Officially founded on October 2, 1914, Porto Velho was founded by pioneers around 1907, during the construction of the Madeira-Mamoré railroad. After the railroad was completed, the local population was about one thousand inhabitants; its buildings were chiefly the railway's installations and the wooden houses of the Caribbean (mainly Barbadian) workers - hence the name of the town's largest district by then, "Bajan Hill" or "Barbados Town", nowadays called the "Alto do Bode".

During the first sixty years, the city's development was directly connected to the railway's activities. The town prospered during the rubber boom; after the discovery of cheap Malaysian rubber made that of the Amazon obsolete, the region's rubber-centered economy ground to a sudden halt. Cities like Santo Antônio do Madeira, which had a tram line and a weekly newspaper by the time of Porto Velho's foundation, are still nothing but ruins to this day.

Porto Velho's survival is associated with the better conditions of the area where it was built, its easy access by the river and its harbor: these were all considerations in the choice of Porto Velho as the capital of the newly formed Federal Territory of Guaporé, in 1943. Only with the beginning of World War II was there another cycle of progress in the region. Once the Allied forces lost control of Malaysian rubber, the Amazon's was needed again due to the war effort. This produced what is known in Brazil as the "second rubber boom". Subsequently, when the war ended, the region's economy once again came to a halt.

Porto Velho's modern history begins with the discovery of cassiterite around the city, and of gold on the Madeira River, at the end of the 1950s. In addition, the government's decision to allow large cattle farms in the territory began a trend of migration into the city. Almost one million people moved to Rondônia, and Porto Velho's population increased to three hundred thousand. This intense migration caused much trouble for the city. Among many other problems, the suburban boroughs, for example, were nothing but shanty towns.

The Catedral Metropolitana Sagrado Coração de Jesus is the cathedral archiepiscopal see of a Latin Catholic jurisdiction that started on May 1, 1925. The vast Territorial Prelature of Porto Velho split off from the then-Diocese of Amazonas and Diocese of São Luíz de Cáceres, and also lost parts to three new Territorial prelatures, before being promoted as the first bishopric (Diocese of Porto Velho). On October 4, 1982, it was promoted as Metropolitan Archdiocese of Porto Velho.

== Geography ==
=== Climate ===
Porto Velho features a tropical monsoon climate (climate type Am) under the Köppen climate classification. The temperatures tend to be relatively consistent throughout the course of the year, with average daily temperatures typically between 25 and 26 degrees Celsius. The dry season is short and covers the months of June, July and August. Porto Velho is particularly wet from November through April, averaging roughly 200 mm (7.9 in) of rain per month in each of these months. According to the Brazilian National Institute of Meteorology (INMET), between 1961 and 1990 the lowest temperature recorded in Porto Velho was 7.4 °C or 45.3 °F in July 1975, and the highest reached 40.9 °C or 105.6 °F in August 1969.

Climate data for Porto Velho (1991–2020 normals, extremes 1961–1990)
Month	Jan	Feb	Mar	Apr	May	Jun	Jul	Aug	Sep	Oct	Nov	Dec	Year
Record high °C (°F)	37.2 (99.0)	36.4 (97.5)	38.7 (101.7)	37.1 (98.8)	36.8 (98.2)	38.8 (101.8)	37.9 (100.2)	40.9 (105.6)	39.4 (102.9)	40.0 (104.0)	39.7 (103.5)	38.0 (100.4)	40.9 (105.6)
Mean daily maximum °C (°F)	31.9 (89.4)	31.4 (88.5)	31.7 (89.1)	31.9 (89.4)	31.6 (88.9)	32.8 (91.0)	33.0 (91.4)	34.5 (94.1)	33.8 (92.8)	33.9 (93.0)	31.8 (89.2)	31.8 (89.2)	32.5 (90.5)
Daily mean °C (°F)	26.2 (79.2)	25.9 (78.6)	25.9 (78.6)	26.0 (78.8)	25.5 (77.9)	25.2 (77.4)	24.7 (76.5)	25.6 (78.1)	26.0 (78.8)	26.6 (79.9)	26.4 (79.5)	25.9 (78.6)	25.8 (78.5)
Mean daily minimum °C (°F)	23.2 (73.8)	22.9 (73.2)	22.8 (73.0)	22.3 (72.1)	21.6 (70.9)	20.1 (68.2)	19.7 (67.5)	19.9 (67.8)	21.3 (70.3)	22.7 (72.9)	23.0 (73.4)	22.9 (73.2)	21.9 (71.4)
Record low °C (°F)	14.4 (57.9)	15.4 (59.7)	12.0 (53.6)	12.8 (55.0)	12.0 (53.6)	11.8 (53.2)	7.4 (45.3)	10.0 (50.0)	12.1 (53.8)	17.7 (63.9)	18.1 (64.6)	11.0 (51.8)	7.4 (45.3)
Average precipitation mm (inches)	320.9 (12.63)	316.0 (12.44)	273.9 (10.78)	251.0 (9.88)	126.6 (4.98)	49.2 (1.94)	24.2 (0.95)	36.4 (1.43)	119.9 (4.72)	192.7 (7.59)	225.2 (8.87)	319.1 (12.56)	2,255.1 (88.77)
Average precipitation days (≥ 1.0 mm)	19	19	20	17	11	4	3	4	11	13	16	19	156
Average relative humidity (%)	89	88	89	89	86	84	80	82	84	86	87	88.7	86.1
Average dew point °C (°F)	23.5 (74.3)	23.4 (74.1)	23.6 (74.5)	23.7 (74.7)	22.8 (73.0)	21.8 (71.2)	20.9 (69.6)	22.6 (72.7)	23.3 (73.9)	23.6 (74.5)	23.7 (74.7)	23.5 (74.3)	23.1 (73.6)
Mean monthly sunshine hours	107.1	98.3	124.0	140.1	183.7	226.7	259.7	234.0	186.8	166.7	137.1	124.2	1,988.4
Source 1: Brazilian National Institute of Meteorology (INMET) (precipitation, humidity and sun 1961–1990)
Source 2: Starlings Roost Weather

=== Vegetation ===
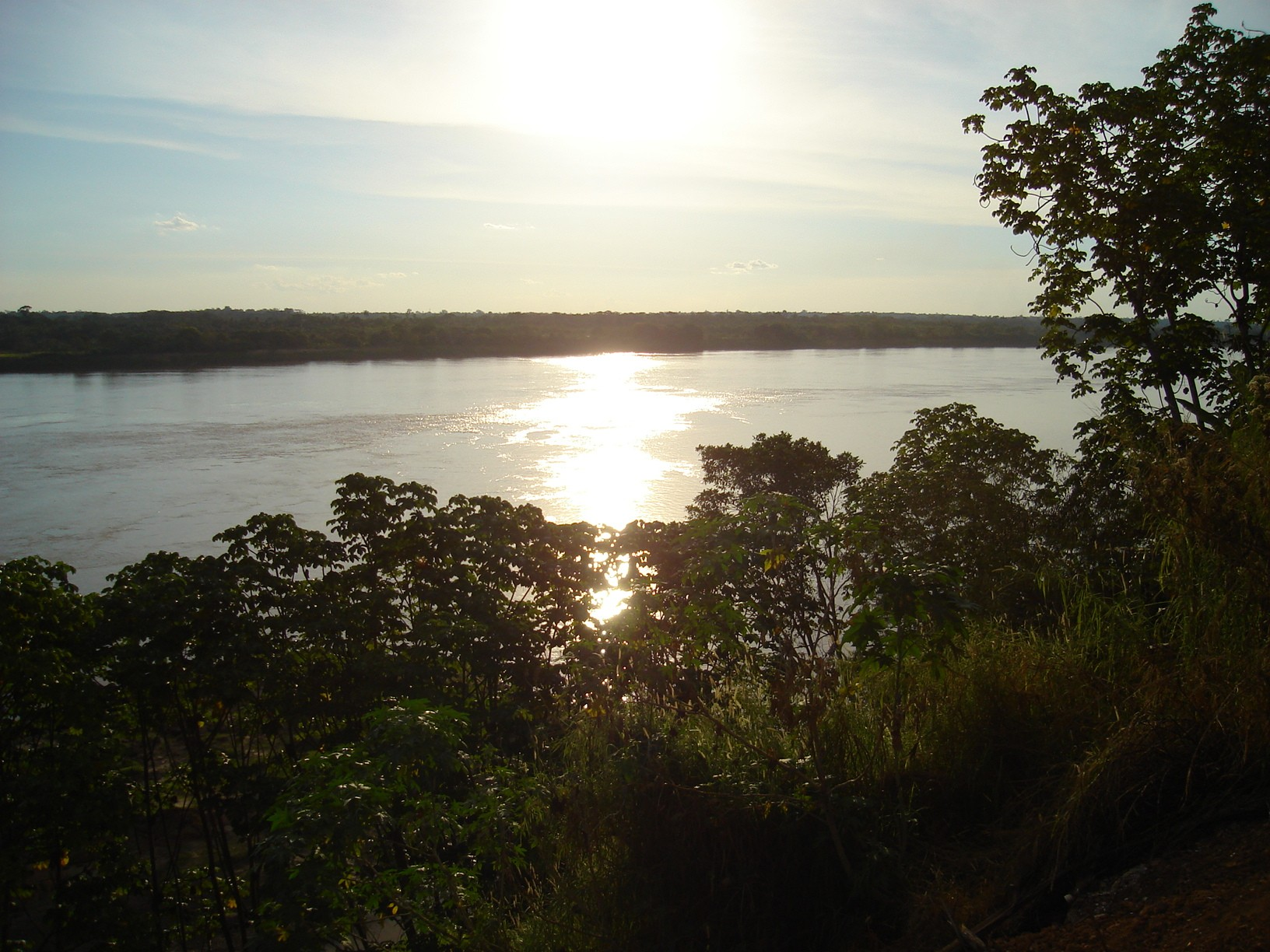
Amazon rainforest and Madeira River.

The Amazon has over half of the planet's remaining rainforests and is the largest and most species-rich tract of tropical rainforest in the world. Wet tropical forests are the most species-rich biome, and tropical forests in the Americas are consistently more species-rich than wet forests in Africa and Asia. As the largest tract of tropical rainforest in the Americas, the Amazonian rainforests have unparalleled biodiversity.

More than one third of all species in the world live in the Amazon Rainforest.

=== Conservation ===
The municipality contains what is left of the Rio Madeira Sustainable Yield Forest (B) and (C), created in 1990. It contains the 55,850 hectares (138,000 acres) Lago do Cuniã Extractive Reserve, created in 1999. It contains part of the strictly-protected Cuniã Ecological Station, an area of savannah parkland. It holds all of the strictly protected 87,412-hectare (216,000-acre) Serra dos Três Irmãos Ecological Station. It contains part of the Mapinguari National Park, a 1,776,914-hectare (4,390,850-acre) conservation unit created in 2008. It also contains part of the 221,218-hectare (546,640-acre) Jacundá National Forest, a sustainable use conservation unit. The municipality contains 66% of the 197,364-hectare (487,700-acre) Jaci Paraná Extractive Reserve, created in 1996. It contains the 18,281-hectare (45,170-acre) Mujica Nava Ecological Station, created in 1996. It contains part of the Bom Futuro National Forest, established in 1988. The majority of the forest surrounding Porto Velho has been cut down, however.

== Economy ==
As of 2005, GDP for the city was R$3,656,512,000.

The per capita income for the city was R$9,779 for the same year.

A 2024 and 2025 report by Trata Brasil ranked Porto Velho last in a public sanitation ranking of Brazil's 100 largest cities, making it, at least, 10 years that this city has been in the last position. The report found that just 41.8% of the city's population has access to municipal drinking water, and just 9.9% were connected to a municipal sewage. Another 2024 study ranking quality of life among Brazil's state capitals found that Porto Velho placed last among them.

== Cityscape ==
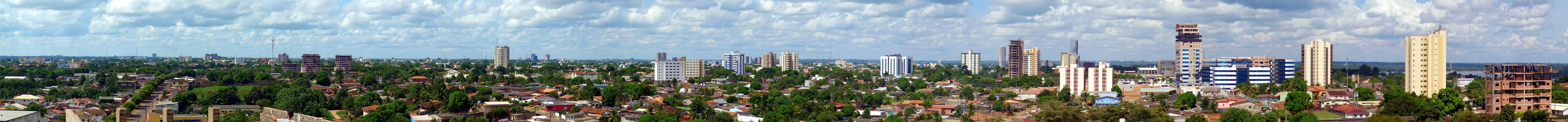
Panorama of Porto Velho as viewed from Pedrinhas neighborhood.

== Transportation ==
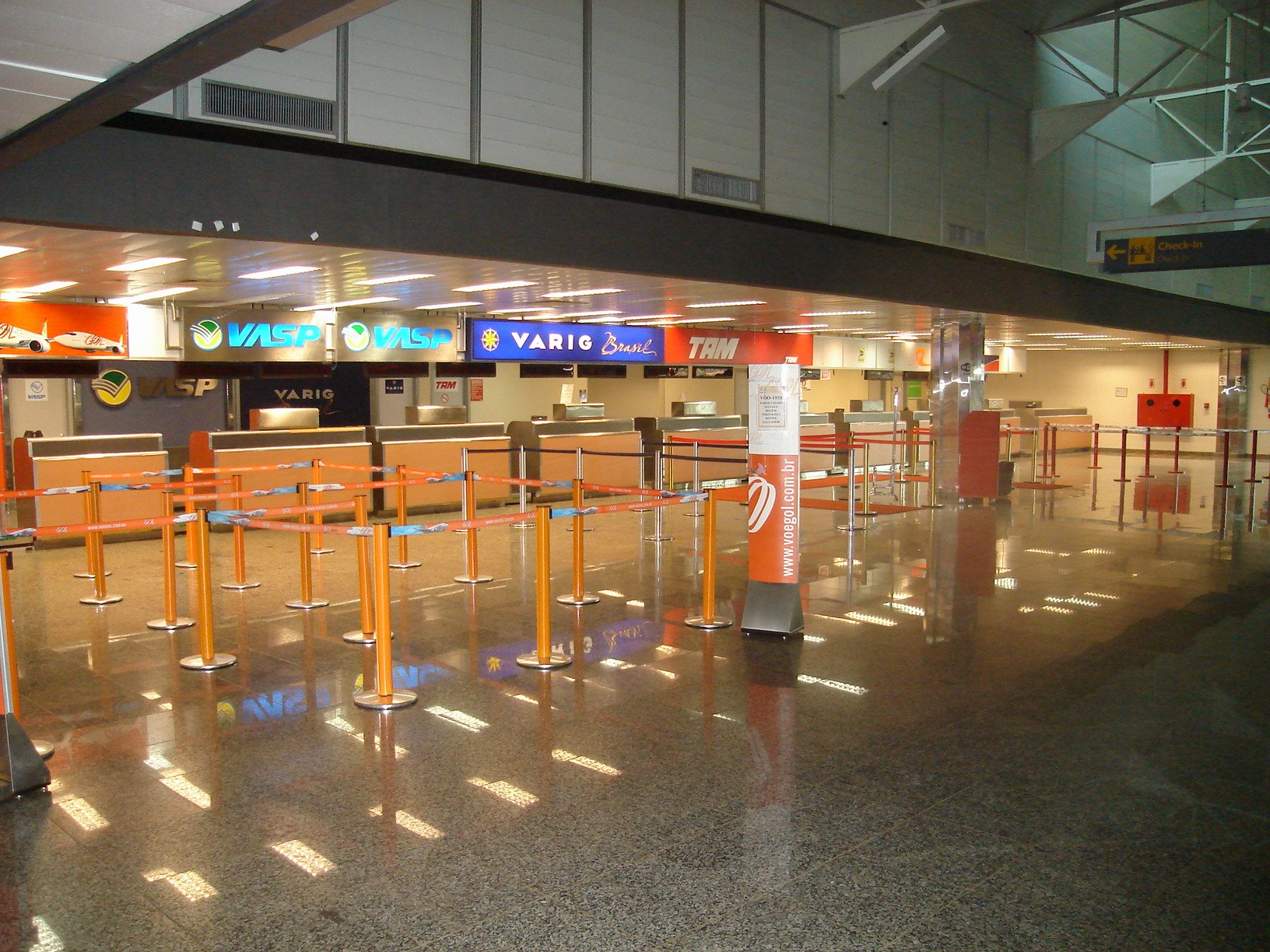
Porto Velho/Governador Jorge Teixeira de Oliveira International Airport.

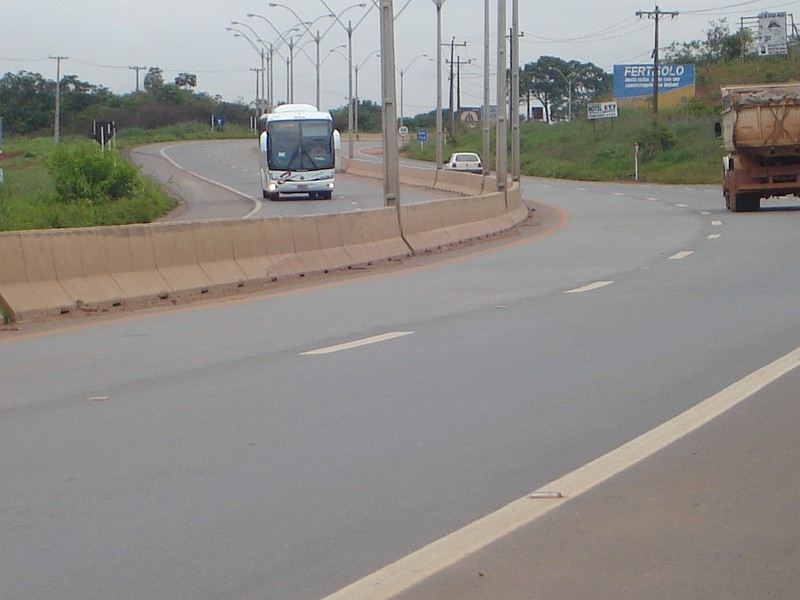
Highway BR-364 near Porto Velho.

=== International Airport ===
Porto Velho International Airport, 7 kilometres (4.3 mi) from the city, has its main access at the Av. Governador Jorge Teixeira de Oliveira, with two lanes. Buses from downtown run to the airport every hour, and there is a fleet of taxis serving only the airport. The airport is served by 98 scheduled flights weekly, most going to other large Brazilian cities. The presence of Porto Velho Air Force Base ensures considerable movement of military aircraft. The local people refer to Porto Velho International as Belmont Airport because it is located in this district. It became an international airport in 2002. It was built as a replacement to Caiari Airport, which was closed on April 16, 1969.

Porto Velho Air Force Base - ALA6, one of their most important bases of the Brazilian Air Force, is located in Porto Velho.

=== Highways ===
- BR-174
- BR-317
- BR-319
- BR-364
- BR-421
- BR-425
- BR-429
- RO-010
- RO-101
- RO-490

== Education ==
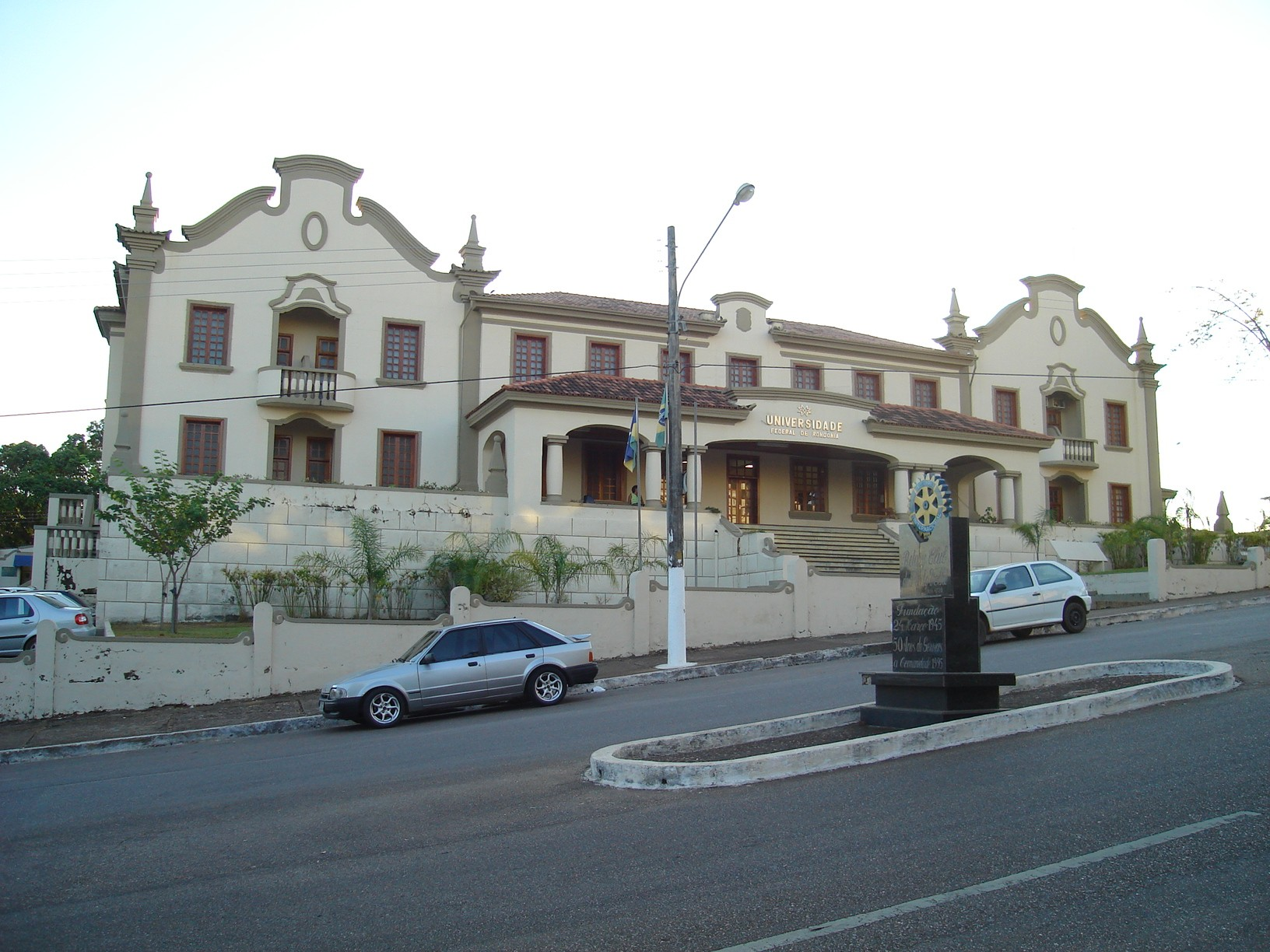
Federal University of Rondônia.

=== Colleges ===
- Universidade Federal de Rondônia (Unir);
- Federal Institute of Education, Science and Technology of Rondônia - Instituto Federal de Educação, Ciência e Tecnologia de Rondônia (IFRO);
- Instituto Luterano de Ensino Superior de Porto Velho (Iles-Ulbra);
- Faculdade Interamericana de Porto Velho (Uniron);
- Faculdade de Ciências Administrativas e de Tecnologia (Fatec-RO);
- Faculdade de Ciências Humanas, Exatas e Letras de Rondônia (Faro);
- Faculdade da Amazônia (Iesa);
- Faculdade de Porto Velho/ Fundação Getúlio Vargas (FIP/FGV);
- Faculdades Integradas Maria Coelho Aguiar (FIMCA);
- Faculdade São Lucas;

=== Schools ===
- Maple Bear Canadian School;
- Colégio Sapiens;
- Classe A;
- Escola Estadual de Ensino Fundamental e Médio João Bento da Costa;
- Colégio Tiradentes da Polícia Militar;
- Centro de Ensino Mineiro;
- Proensino;
- Instituto Laura Vicuña;
- Instituto Estadual de Educação Carmela Dutra;
- Colégio Dom Bosco;
- Centro Educacional Dr Gilberto Mendes De Azevedo;
- Instituto Maria Auxiliadora.

== Culture ==
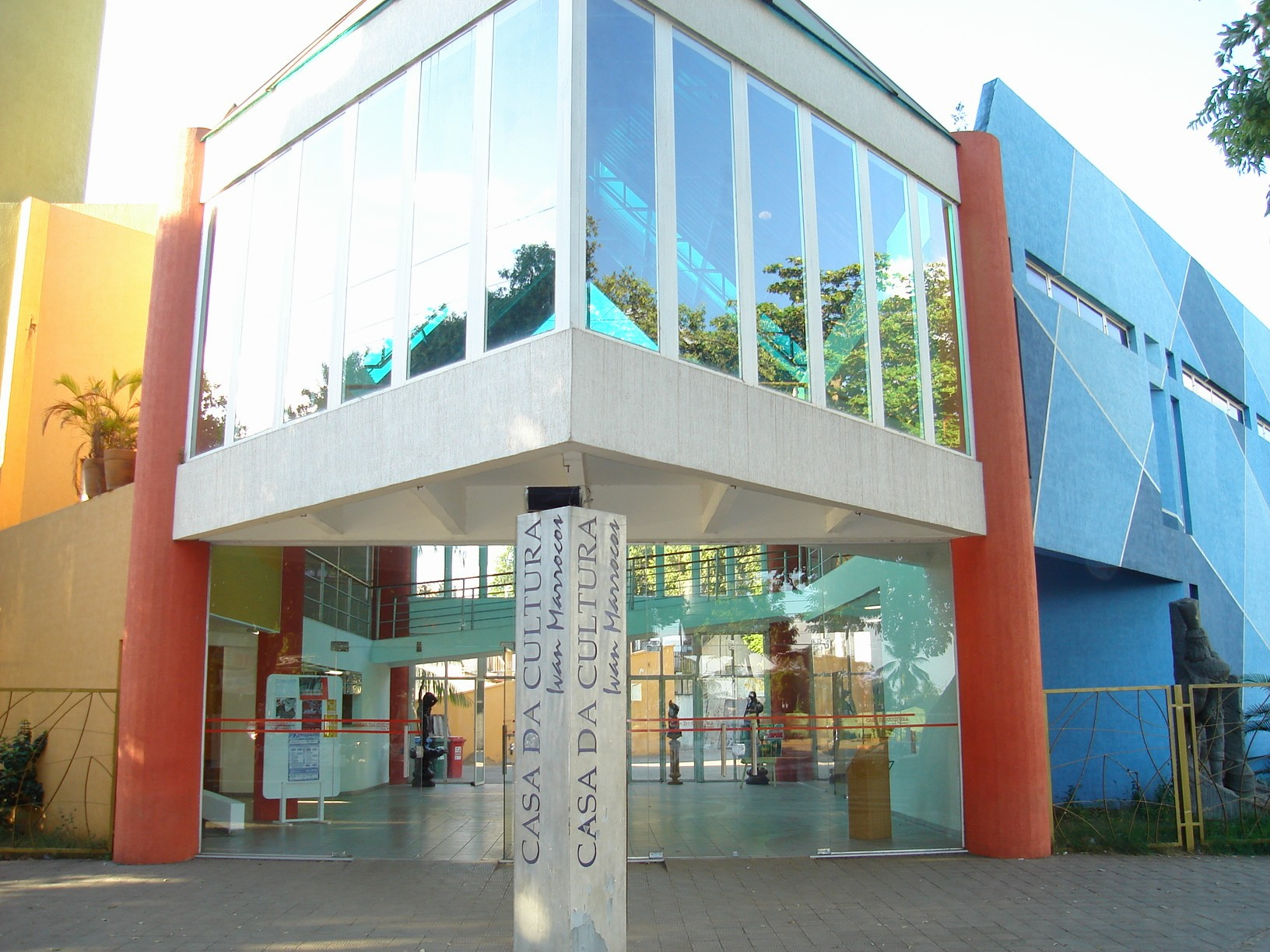
Casa da Cultura Ivan Marrocos, Porto Velho, Rondônia, Brasil - The House of Culture at Porto Velho.

The culture of Porto Velho is marked by a strong Northeastern influence with Bumba Meu Boi, the popular Festa Junina and Pastorinha celebrations, and some influences of south central Brazil. The interpretation of Native American legends, such as the Iara, the Boto and Mapinguari folklore, influenced by migrants. As for handicrafts, there are various exhibitions of indigenous works, utilities and adornment using raw materials like clay, vines, bamboo and rubber. The Artisan's House serves as a support to the initiatives of the genre.

=== Libraries ===
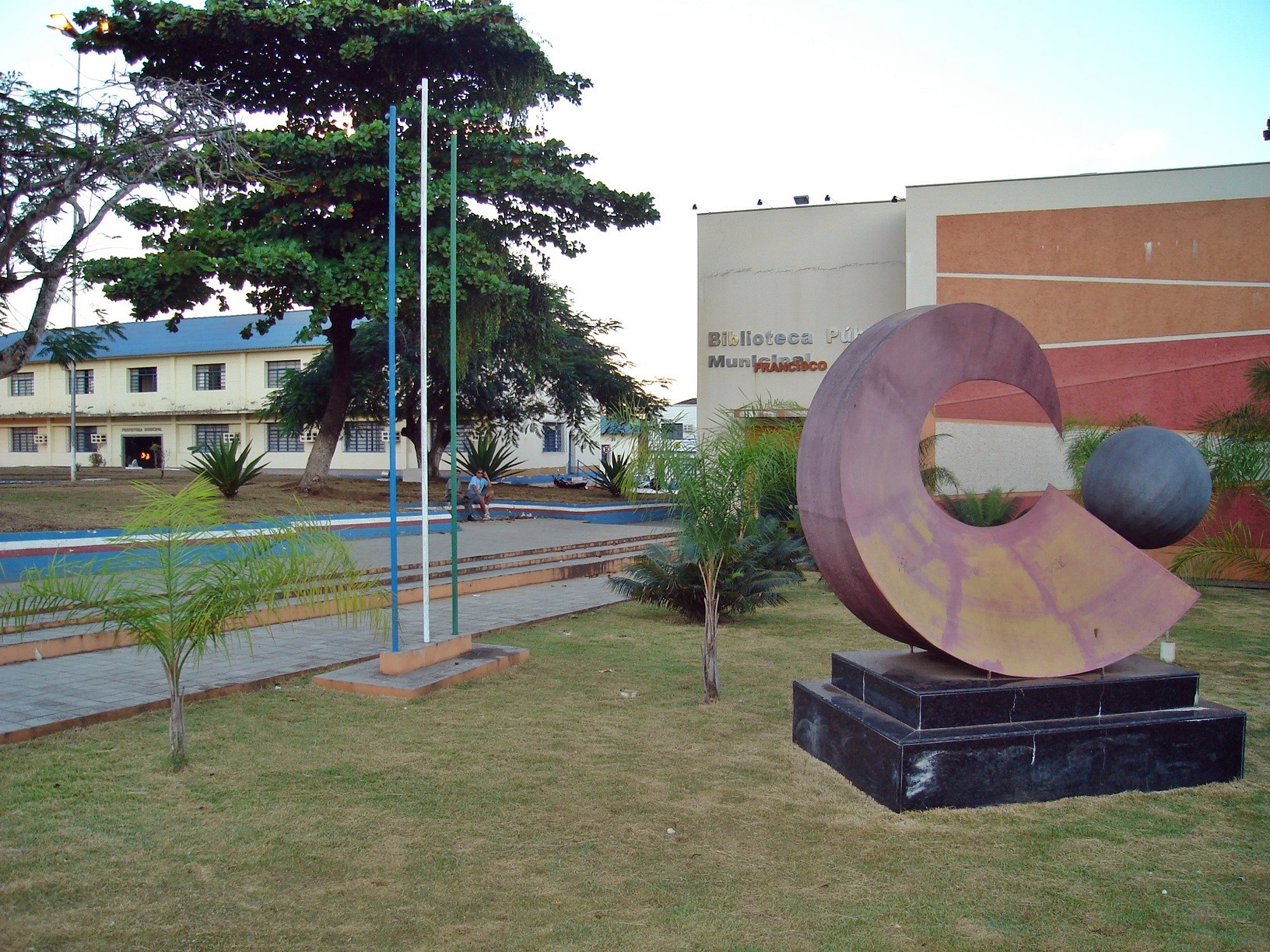
Porto Velho Town Hall and Library, Rondônia, Brazil.

The collection of library articles in municipal Porto Velho was waiting for a permanent headquarters for several years until completion of the Municipal Library next to City Hall. The space has two air-conditioned floors in the city center.

=== Carnival ===
The Carnival takes place every year, attracting a large number of people from other cities and neighboring states of Rondônia. During the carnival, there are the parades of carnival and samba schools; among the best known are The Diplomats, Asfaltão, among others.

In July Carnival happens out of season, with characteristics of the Bahia Carnival, with electric trios and 'Axé' groups.

=== Theatres ===
Two theaters enliven the cultural sector: The Municipal Theater, Avenida Nabuco (center) and Theatre Uirassu Rodrigues, Jose Bonifacio Street.

=== Museums ===
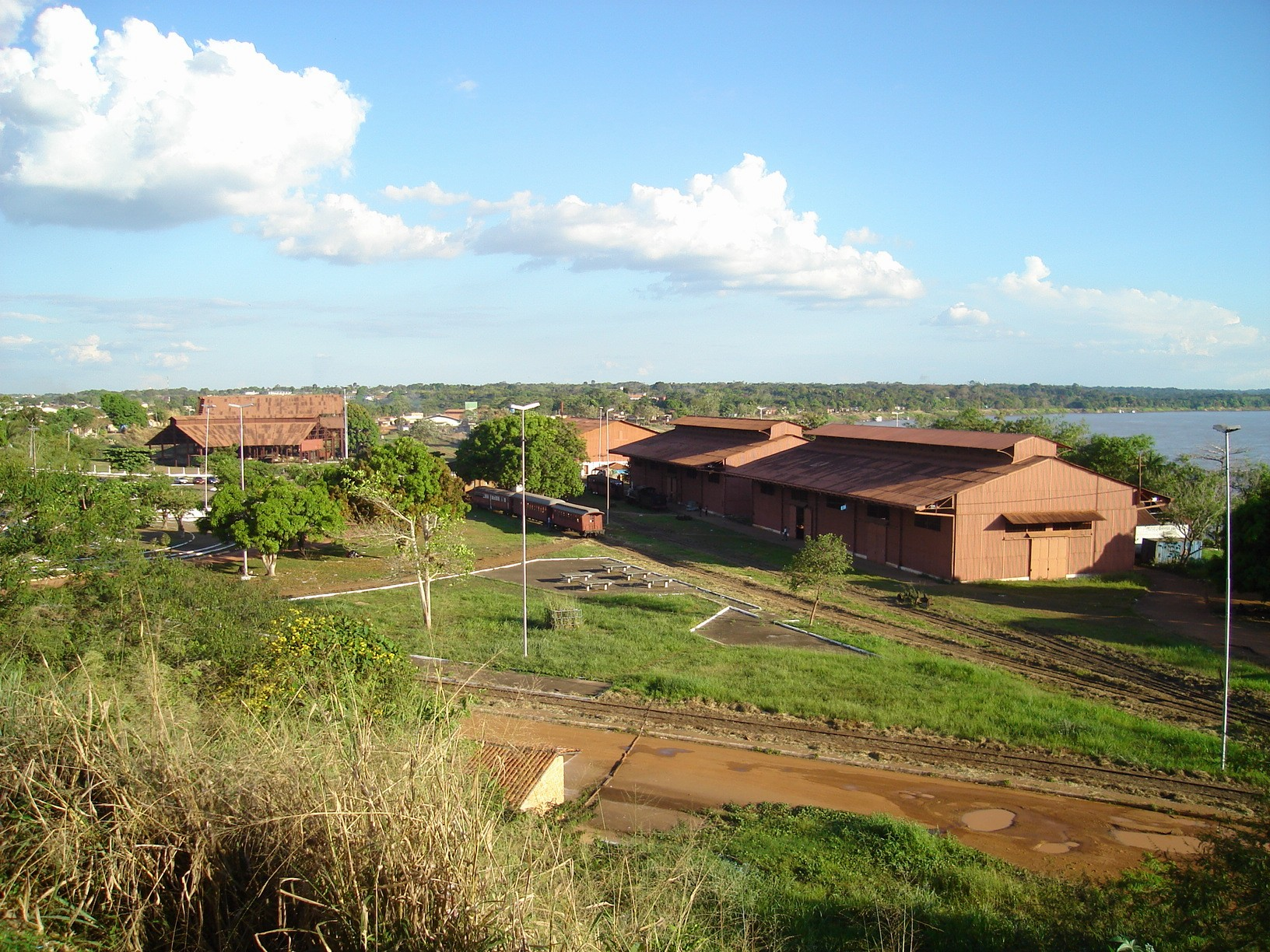
Estrada de Ferro Madeira Mamoré em Porto Velho, Rondônia, Brasil.

The railway complex is located the Museum of Railroad Madeira-Mamore, in the city center. Within it lies the State Museum, with abundant material on archeology, ethnology and Mineralogy.

==== Museum of Railroad Madeira-Mamore ====
The Museum is housed in a warehouse that was used for loading and unloading for almost a century. One can see hundreds of materials in this preserved railway. The museum has several pieces from the time of its construction and operation. Besides the first locomotive brought to the Amazon, the Coronel Church, there is also a 'stork and a tricycle', used to transport the line foremen who checked lathes, machines, furniture, as well as photographs of workers, books, documents and more. The museum is located at Avenida September 7 - Railroad Square Madeira-Mamore. Outside the museum, on the waterfront, you can take a ride in one of the "barges" to Teotônio waterfall.

=== Monuments ===
==== The Three Boxes Water ====
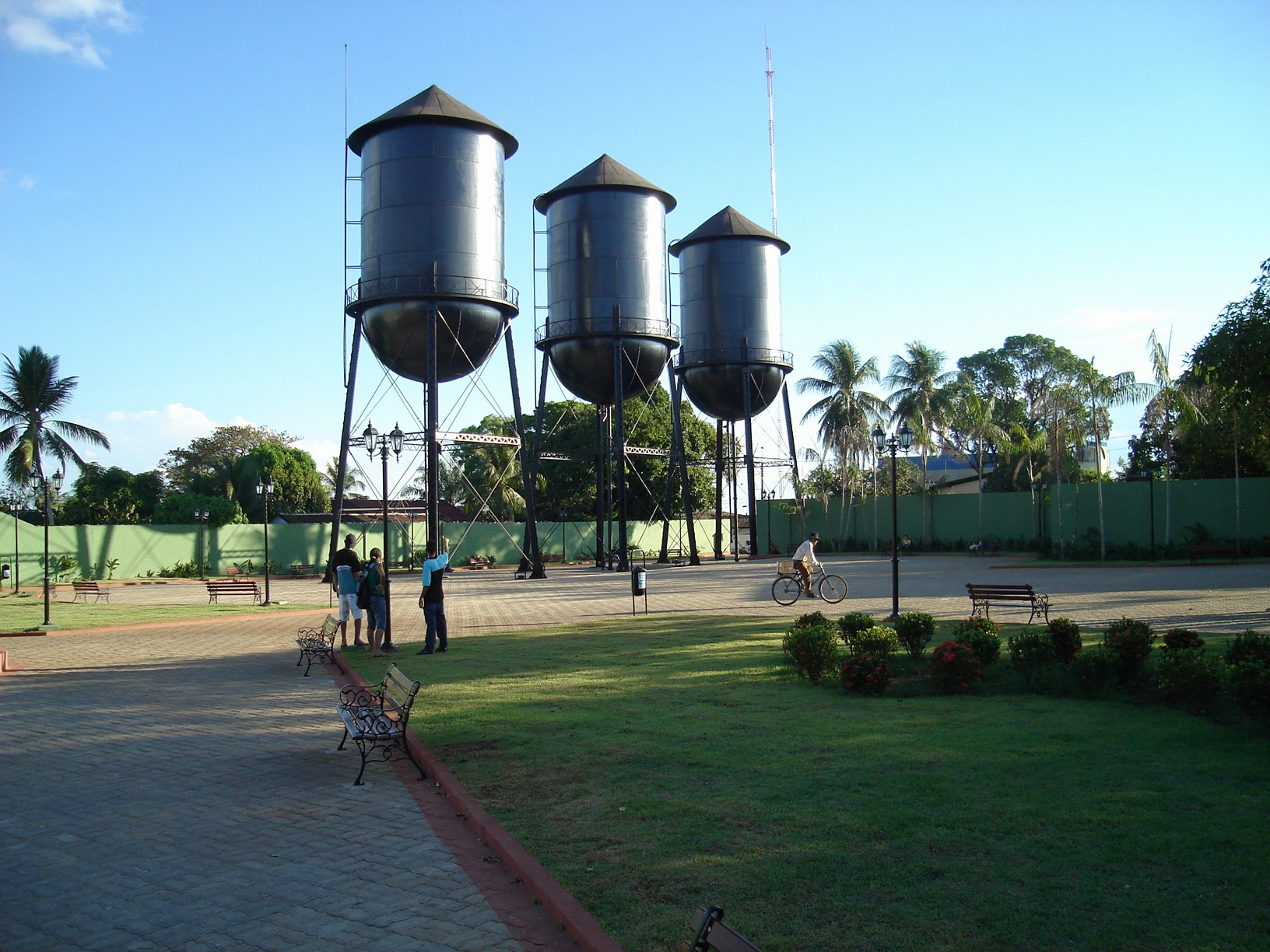
Praça das Três Marias, Porto Velho, Rondônia, Brasil - Three "Marias" Square, Porto Velho, Rondônia, Brazil.

Also known as The Three Marias, the water tanks are in the center of town, in the square of the same name. The first was erected in 1910 and the other two in 1912. They were designed and built by Chicago Bridge & Iron Works of Chicago as per information contained in cast-iron plate, carved pilasters on each of them. There are three cylindrical tanks, covered with metal sheets in a conical shape, with a concave-shaped base. Each tank is elevated from the ground by four columns made of iron lattice on concrete foundations. They are at the height of the bulge surrounded by a walkway railing with metal lattice through which arrives via a ladder. Each reservoir has a capacity for 200,000 liters and supplied the city of Porto Velho by the year 1957, working as gravity-fed reservoirs.

==== The Cathedral of the Sacred Heart of Jesus ====
The cathedral had its construction initiated in 1917, but was completed only ten years later because of difficulties in transporting material. Original paintings of a religious nature inside the cathedral, were executed by Father Angelo Cerri and Alfonso Liguori. The stained glass windows that surround it, with the themes of the Cross, were all donated by the community-velhense port.

== Crime ==
A 2024 report by the Mexico-based organization Citizen Council for Public Security and Criminal Justice ranked Porto Velho as one of the cities with the highest violent crime rates in Brazil, and among the 50 highest in the entire world, being the 7th most dangerous Brazilian state capital city.

== Sport ==
The city currently has seven football teams: CF Amazônia, Cruzeiro EC, Porto Velho EC, SC Genus de Porto Velho, SC Shallon, Moto EC and Rondoniense SC. In the past the city was also home to Ferroviário AC, CR Flamengo, São Domingos EC, and Ypiranga EC before these clubs folded. All clubs share the one stadium in the city, the Aluizão, named after Aluízio Ferreira, with a smaller ground Saldanão also available.
