= Léo Moraes =

Brazilian politician (born 1984)

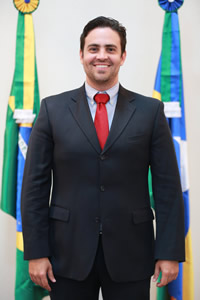
- Moraes in 2015

Mayor of Porto Velho
- Incumbent
- Assumed office 1 January 2025

Personal details
- Born: 11 January 1984 (age 42)
- Party: Podemos (since 2018)

Leonardo Barreto de Moraes (born 11 January 1984) is a Brazilian politician serving as mayor of Porto Velho since 2025. From 2019 to 2023, he was a member of the Chamber of Deputies.
