= Ferroviário Atlético Clube (RO) =

Ferroviário
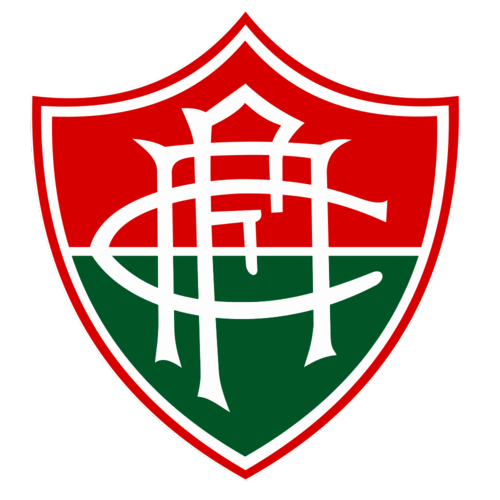
- Full name: Ferroviário Atlético Clube
- Nickname(s): Ferrim; Ferrão
- Founded: July 10, 1943
- Dissolved: 1991
- Ground: Estádio Aluízio Ferreira, Porto Velho, Rondônia state, Brazil
- Capacity: 7,000
Home colors	Away colors

Ferroviario Atlético Clube, commonly known as Ferroviário, was a Brazilian football club based in Porto Velho, Rondônia state. They were the most successful team in the Campeonato Rondoniense. They were dissolved in 1991, after losing the Campeonato Rondoniense of that year to Ji Paraná

== History ==
The club was founded on July 10, 1943, by employees of Madeira-Mamoré Railroad. Ferroviário won the Campeonato Rondoniense in 1946, 1947, 1948, 1949, 1950, 1951, 1952, 1955, 1957, 1958, 1963, 1970, 1978, 1979, 1986, 1987, and in 1989.

The club dissolved in 1991.

== Honours ==
=== Regional ===
- Torneio de Integração da Amazônia
  - Winners (1): 1980

=== State ===
- Campeonato Rondoniense
  - Winners (17): 1946, 1947, 1948, 1949, 1950, 1951, 1952, 1955, 1957, 1958, 1963, 1970, 1978, 1979, 1986, 1987, 1989
  - Runners-up (2): 1982, 1991

== Stadium ==
Ferroviário Atlético Clube played their home games at Estádio Aluízio Ferreira. The stadium has a maximum capacity of 7,000 people.
