= Torneio de Integração da Amazônia =

Defunct Brazilian football competition

- Organiser(s): Brazilian Sports Confederation; Brazilian Football Confederation
- Founded: 1975
- Abolished: 2003
- Region: Brazil's North
- Most championships: (Amapá) Trem (5 titles)

The Torneio de Integração da Amazônia was a football competition organized by the Brazilian Football Confederation with the intention to integrate the Amazonian region and to develop the football in the region.

== Format ==
In 2003, the eight participating clubs were divided in the first stage in two groups of four teams each, the winner of each group played the final. All stages of the competition were played in single-legged games.

== List of champions ==
Year	Winner	Runner-up
1975	(Amapá) Macapá	(Rondônia) Ferroviário
1976	(Acre (state)) Rio Branco	(Acre (state)) Juventus
1977	(Rondônia) Moto Clube	(Acre (state)) Rio Branco
1978	(Rondônia) Moto Clube	(Acre (state)) Rio Branco
1979	(Acre (state)) Rio Branco	(Rondônia) Moto Clube
1980	(Rondônia) Ferroviário	(Amapá) Trem
1981	(Acre (state)) Juventus	(Roraima) River
1982	(Acre (state)) Juventus	(Rondônia) Ferroviário
1983	(Roraima) Baré	(Acre (state)) Independência
1984	(Acre (state)) Rio Branco	(Roraima) Baré
1985	(Roraima) Baré and (Amapá) Trem (shared)	
1986	(Amapá) Trem	(Acre (state)) Rio Branco
1987	(Amapá) Trem	(Acre (state)) Rio Branco
1988	(Amapá) Trem	(Acre (state)) Atlético Acreano
1989	(Amapá) Independente	(Rondônia) Ferroviário
1990	(Amapá) Trem	(Amapá) Independente
2003	(Rondônia) CFA	(Amapá) Trem

== Statistics ==
=== Titles by team ===
Club	State	Titles
Trem	Amapá	5 (1985, 1986, 1987, 1988 and 1990)
Rio Branco	(Acre (state)) Acre	3 (1976, 1979 and 1984)
Baré	Roraima	2 (1983 and 1985)
Juventus	(Acre (state)) Acre	2 (1981 and 1982)
Moto Clube	Rondônia	2 (1977 and 1978)
Macapá	Amapá	1 (1975)
Ferroviário	Rondônia	1 (1980)
CFA	Rondônia	1 (2003)

=== Titles by state ===
State	Titles
Amapá	6
Acre	5
Rondônia	4
Roraima	2
