= Aluízio Ferreira =

Brazilian politician (1897–1980)

Aluízio Pinheiro Ferreira
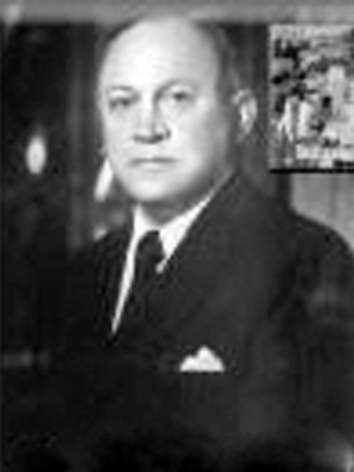

Personal details
- Born: 11 May 1897 Bragança, Pará, Brazil
- Died: 1980 (aged 82–83) Rio de Janeiro, Brazil

Aluízio Pinheiro Ferreira (1897-1980) was the first governor of the former Território Federal do Guaporé (nowadays Rondônia). Aluízio Ferreira Stadium is named after him.
