= Campeonato Rondoniense =

Football league in Rondônia, Brazil

- Organising body: FFER
- Founded: 1945; 81 years ago (as Liga de Futebol de Porto Velho amateur); 1982; 44 years ago as (Liga de Futebol de Rondônia amateur); 1991; 35 years ago (as Campeonato Rondoniense de Futebol Profissional)
- Country: Brazil
- State: Rondônia
- Level on pyramid: 1
- Relegation to: Campeonato Rondoniense Second Division
- Domestic cup(s): Copa do Brasil, Copa Verde
- Current champions: Guaporé (1st title) (2026)
- Most championships: Ferroviário (17 titles, amateur era); Ji-Paraná (9 titles, professional era)
- Website: FFER Official website

The Campeonato Rondoniense is the top-flight professional state football league in the Brazilian state of Rondônia. It is run by the Rondônia Football Federation (FFER). Between 1945 and 1990, the league was an amateur competition. The professional league started in 1991.

== List of champions ==
=== Amateur era ===
==== Liga de Futebol de Porto Velho ====
Season	Champions
1945	Ypiranga (1)
1946	Ferroviário (1)
1947	Ferroviário (2)
1948	Ferroviário (3)
1949	Ferroviário (4)
1950	Ferroviário (5)
1951	Ferroviário (6)
1952	Ferroviário (7)
1953	Ypiranga (2)
1954	Moto Clube (1)
1955	Ferroviário (8)
1956	Flamengo (1)
1957	Ferroviário (9)
1958	Ferroviário (10)
1959	Ypiranga (3)
1960	Flamengo (2)
1961	Flamengo (3)
1962	Flamengo (4)
1963	Ferroviário (11)
1964	Ypiranga (4)
1965	Flamengo (5)
1966	Flamengo (6)
1967	Flamengo (7)
1968	Moto Clube (2)
1969	Moto Clube (3)
1970	Ferroviário (12)
1971	Moto Clube (4)
1972	Moto Clube (5)
1973	São Domingos (1)
1974	Botafogo (1)
1975	Moto Clube (6)
1976	Moto Clube (7)
1977	Moto Clube (8)
1978	Ferroviário (13)
1979	Ferroviário (14)
1980	Moto Clube (9)
1981	Moto Clube (10)

==== Liga de Futebol de Rondônia ====
Season	Champions
1982	Flamengo (8)
1983	Flamengo (9)
1984	Ypiranga (5)
1985	Flamengo (10)
1986	Ferroviário (15)
1987	São Paulo de Vilhena (1)
1988	Ferroviário (16)
1989	Ferroviário (17)
1990	Not held

=== Professional era ===
Season	Champions	Runners-up
1991	Ji-Paraná (1)	Ferroviário
1992	Ji-Paraná (2)	Grêmio Espigão
1993	SE Ariquemes (1)	Porto Velho FC
1994	SE Ariquemes (2)	Ji-Paraná
1995	Ji-Paraná (3)	Pinheiros
1996	Ji-Paraná (4)	SE Ariquemes
1997	Ji-Paraná (5)	Ouro Preto
1998	Ji-Paraná (6)	Guajará
1999	Ji-Paraná (7)	Pinheiros
2000	Guajará (1)	Genus
2001	Ji-Paraná (8)	União Cacoalense
2002	CFA (1)	União Cacoalense
2003	União Cacoalense (1)	CFA
2004	União Cacoalense (2)	Ji-Paraná
2005	Vilhena (1)	Ji-Paraná
2006	Ulbra Ji-Paraná (1)	Vilhena
2007	Ulbra Ji-Paraná (2)	Jaruense
2008	Ulbra Ji-Paraná (3)	Vilhena
2009	Vilhena (2)	Genus
2010	Vilhena (3)	Ariquemes FC
2011	Espigão (1)	Ariquemes FC
2012	Ji-Paraná (9)	Espigão
2013	Vilhena (4)	Pimentense
2014	Vilhena (5)	Ariquemes FC
2015	Genus (1)	Vilhena
2016	Rondoniense (1)	Genus
2017	Real Ariquemes (1)	Barcelona
2018	Real Ariquemes (2)	Barcelona
2019	Vilhenense (1)	Ji-Paraná
2020	Porto Velho EC (1)	Real Ariquemes
2021	Porto Velho EC (2)	Real Ariquemes
2022	Real Ariquemes (3)	União Cacoalense
2023	Porto Velho EC (3)	Ji-Paraná
2024	Porto Velho EC (4)	Barcelona
2025	Porto Velho EC (5)	Guaporé
2026	Guaporé (1)	Rondoniense

== Titles by team ==
Teams in bold stills active.

Rank	Club	Winners	Winning years
1	Ferroviário	17	1946, 1947, 1948, 1949, 1950, 1951, 1952, 1955, 1957, 1958, 1963, 1970, 1978, 1979, 1986, 1988, 1989
2	Flamengo	10	1956, 1961, 1962, 1963, 1965, 1966, 1967, 1982, 1983, 1985
2	Moto Clube	10	1954, 1968, 1969, 1971, 1972, 1975, 1976, 1977, 1980, 1981
4	**Ji-Paraná**	9	1991, 1992, 1995, 1996, 1997, 1998, 1999, 2001, 2012
5	**Porto Velho EC**	5	2020, 2021, 2023, 2024, 2025
5	Vilhena	5	2005, 2009, 2010, 2013, 2014
5	Ypiranga	5	1945, 1953, 1959, 1964, 1984
8	**Real Ariquemes**	3	2017, 2018, 2022
8	Ulbra	3	2006, 2007, 2008
10	SE Ariquemes	2	1993, 1994
10	**União Cacoalense**	2	2003, 2004
12	Botafogo	1	1974
12	CFA	1	2002
12	Espigão	1	2011
12	**Genus**	1	2015
12	Guajará	1	2000
12	**Guaporé**	1	2026
12	**Rondoniense**	1	2016
12	São Domingos	1	1973
12	São Paulo	1	1987
12	Vilhenense	1	2019

=== By city ===
City	Championships	Clubs
Porto Velho	52	Ferroviário (17), Flamengo (10), Moto Clube (10), Ypiranga (5), Porto Velho EC (5), Botafogo (1), CFA (1), Genus (1), Rondoniense (1), São Domingos (1)
Ji-Paraná	12	Ji-Paraná (9), Ulbra (3)
Vilhena	7	Vilhena (5), São Paulo (1), Vilhenense (1)
Ariquemes	5	Real Ariquemes (3), SE Ariquemes (2)
Cacoal	2	União Cacoalense (2)
Espigão d'Oeste	1	Espigão (1)
Guajará-Mirim	1	Guajará (1)
Rolim de Moura	1	Guaporé (1)
