= FIFA World Cup =

- Organiser(s): FIFA
- Founded: 1930; 96 years ago
- Region: International
- Teams: 13 (1930, 1950); 15 (1938); 16 (1934, 1954–1978); 24 (1982–1994); 32 (1998–2022); 48 (2026–present)
- Related competitions: FIFA Women's World Cup
- Current champions: Spain (2nd title)
- Most championships: Brazil (5 titles)
- Website: fifa.com/worldcup
- Editions: 1930; 1934; 1938; 1950; 1954; 1958; 1962; 1966; 1970; 1974; 1978; 1982; 1986; 1990; 1994; 1998; 2002; 2006; 2010; 2014; 2018; 2022; 2026

The FIFA World Cup is an international association football competition among the senior men's national teams of the members of the Fédération Internationale de Football Association (FIFA), the sport's global governing body. The tournament has been held every four years since the inaugural tournament in 1930, with the exception of 1942 and 1946 during and shortly after World War II. The reigning champion is Spain, who won their second title at the 23rd edition of the competition, the 2026 World Cup, by defeating the holders, Argentina.

The World Cup is globally regarded as the most prestigious association football competition, as well as the most widely viewed and followed sporting and cultural event in the world. The viewership of the 2018 World Cup was estimated to be 3.57 billion, close to half of the global population, while the engagement with the 2022 World Cup was estimated to be 5 billion, with about 1.5 billion people watching the final match.

The contest starts with the qualification phase organized by the respective regional confederations, which takes place over the preceding three years to determine which teams qualify for the tournament phase. In the tournament phase, 48 teams (as of the 2026 World Cup) compete for the title at venues within the host nation(s) over the course of about a month, initially in groups and then in a series of knockout rounds that culminate in the final to determine the overall winner. The host nation(s) automatically qualify for the group stage of the tournament. Nineteen countries have hosted the event, sometimes co-hosting with other nations.

As of the 2026 World Cup, 23 tournaments have been held since the event's inception in 1930, and a total of 84 national teams have competed. The trophy has been won by eight national teams. With five wins, Brazil are the only team to have played in every tournament. The other World Cup winners are Germany and Italy, with four titles each; Argentina, with three titles; France, Spain, and inaugural winner Uruguay, each with two titles; and England with one title.

== History ==
=== Previous international competitions ===
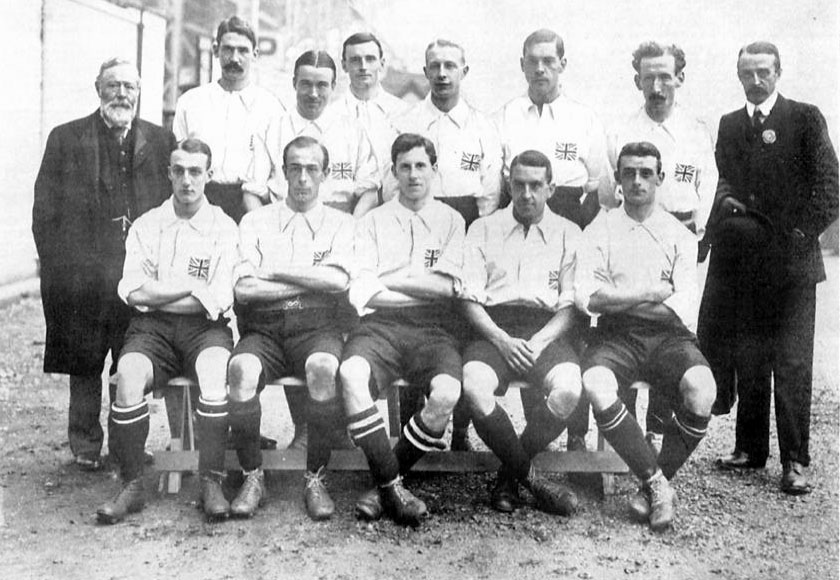
Team of Great Britain that won the Olympic tournament in 1908

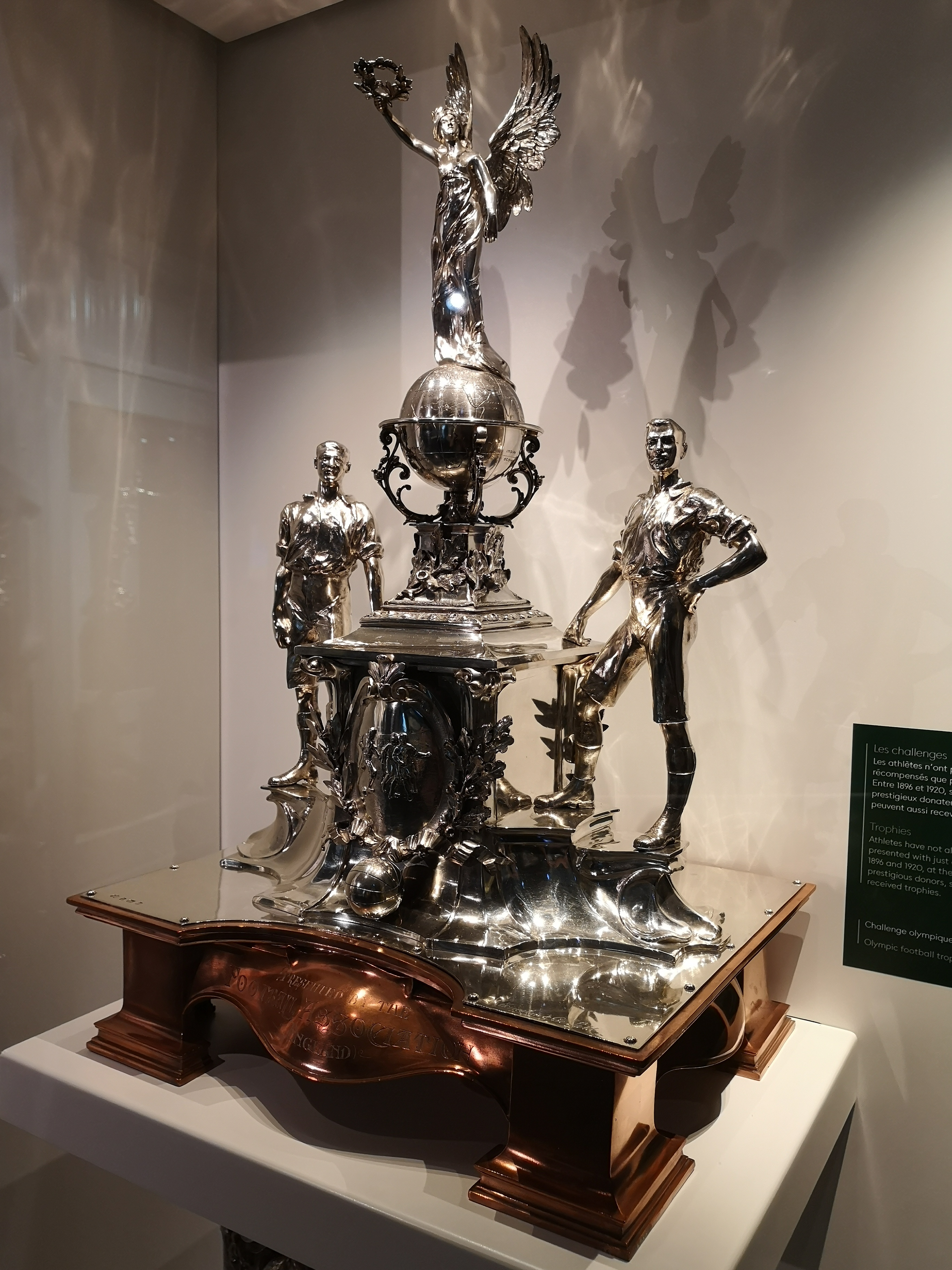
Olympic Challenge football trophy awarded to the winner of 1920 Olympic tournament

The world's first international football match was a challenge match played in Glasgow in 1872 between Scotland and England. The first international tournament for nations, the inaugural British Home Championship, took place in 1884 and included games between England, Scotland, Wales, and Ireland. As football grew in popularity in other parts of the world at the start of the 20th century, it was held as a demonstration sport with no medals awarded at the 1900 and 1904 Summer Olympics (the International Olympic Committee has retroactively upgraded their status to official events) and at the unofficial 1906 Intercalated Games.

After FIFA was founded in 1904, it tried to arrange an international football tournament between nations outside the Olympic framework in Switzerland in 1906. These were very early days for international football, and the official history of FIFA describes the competition as having been unsuccessful.

At the 1908 Summer Olympics in London, football became an official Olympic sport. Planned by the Football Association (the FA), England's football governing body, the event was for amateur players only and was regarded suspiciously as a show rather than a competition. Great Britain (represented by the England national amateur football team) won the gold medals. They repeated the feat at the 1912 Summer Olympics in Stockholm.

With the Olympic event continuing to be a contest between amateur teams only, Sir Thomas Lipton organised the Sir Thomas Lipton Trophy tournament in Turin in 1909. The Lipton tournament was a championship between individual clubs (not national teams) from different nations, each of which represented an entire nation. The competition is sometimes described as The First World Cup, and featured the most prestigious professional club sides from Italy, Germany and Switzerland, but the FA of England refused to be associated with the competition and declined the offer to send a professional team. Lipton invited West Auckland, an amateur side from County Durham, to represent England instead. West Auckland won the tournament and returned in 1911 to successfully defend their title. Prior to the Lipton competition, from 1876 to 1904, games that were considered to be the "football world championship" were meetings between leading English and Scottish clubs, such as the 1895 game between Sunderland A.F.C. and the Heart of Midlothian F.C., which Sunderland won.

In 1914, FIFA agreed to recognise the Olympic tournament as a "world football championship for amateurs", and took responsibility for managing the event. This paved the way for the world's first intercontinental football competition for nations, at the 1920 Summer Olympics, contested by Egypt and 13 European teams, and won by Belgium. Uruguay won the next two Olympic football tournaments in 1924 and 1928. Those were also the first two open world championships, as 1924 was the start of FIFA's professional era, and is the reason why Uruguay is allowed to wear 4 stars.

=== World Cups before World War II ===
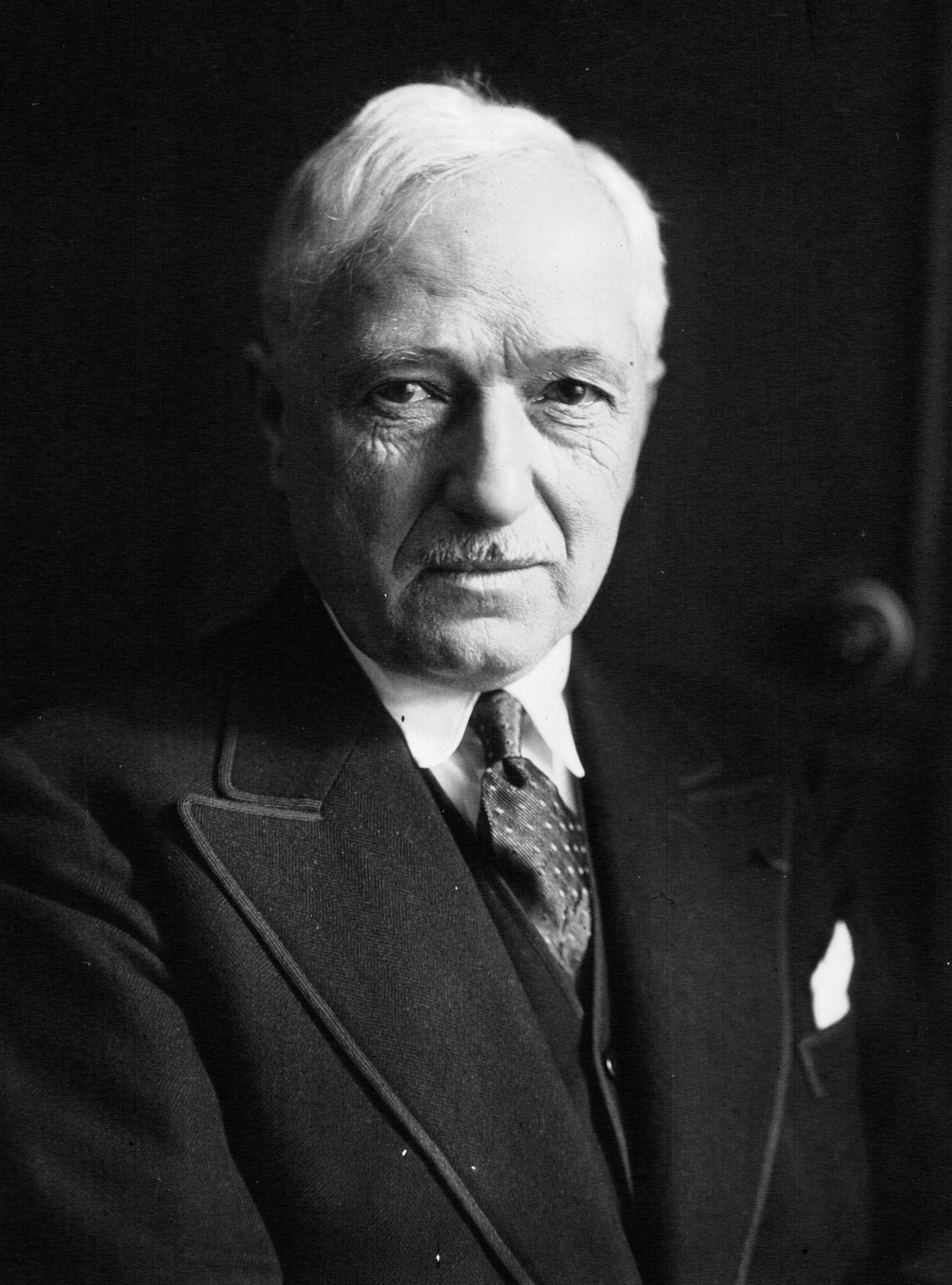
FIFA president Jules Rimet convinced the confederations to promote an international football tournament

After the success of the Olympic football tournaments, FIFA, with President Jules Rimet as the driving force, again started looking at staging its own international tournament outside of the Olympics. On 28 May 1928, the FIFA Congress in Amsterdam decided to stage a world championship. With Uruguay now two-time official football world champions and to celebrate their centenary of independence in 1930, FIFA named Uruguay as the host country of the inaugural World Cup tournament.

The national associations of selected nations were invited to send a team, but the choice of Uruguay as a venue for the competition meant a long and costly trip across the Atlantic Ocean for European sides, especially in the midst of the Great Depression. As such, no European country pledged to send a team until two months before the start of the competition. Rimet eventually persuaded teams from Belgium, France, Romania, and Yugoslavia to make the trip. In total, 13 nations took part: seven from South America, four from Europe, and two from North America.

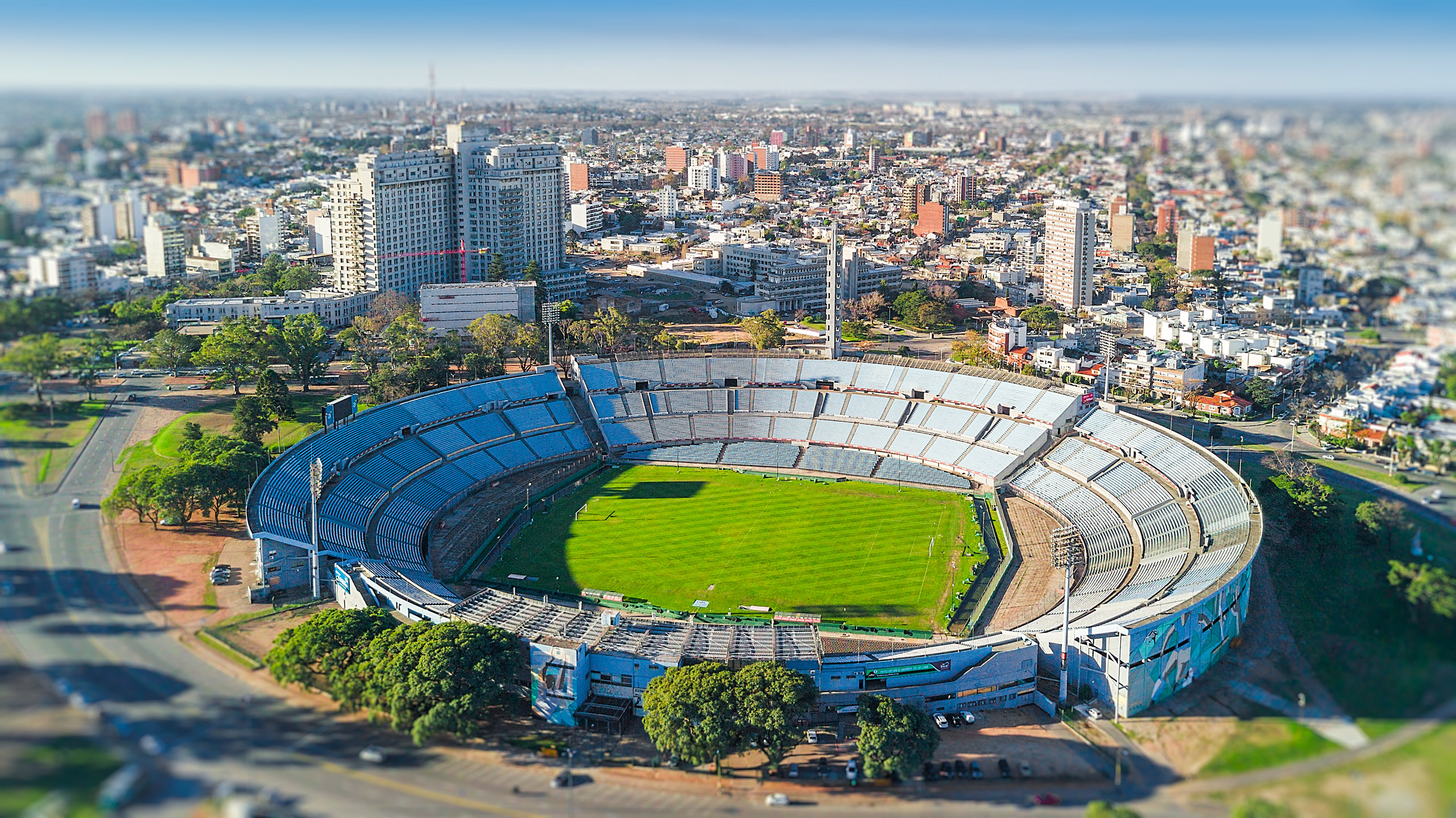
Estadio Centenario, the location of the first World Cup final in 1930 in Montevideo, Uruguay

The first two World Cup matches took place simultaneously on 13 July 1930 and were won by France and the United States, who defeated Mexico 4–1 and Belgium 3–0, respectively. The first goal in World Cup history was scored by Lucien Laurent of France. In the final, Uruguay defeated Argentina 4–2 in front of 93,000 spectators in Montevideo and became the first nation to win the World Cup. After the creation of the World Cup, FIFA and the IOC disagreed over the status of amateur players; football was dropped from the 1932 Summer Olympics. After the IOC and FIFA worked out their differences, Olympic football returned at the 1936 Summer Olympics but was now overshadowed by the more prestigious World Cup.

The issues facing the early World Cup tournaments were the difficulties of intercontinental travel and war. Few South American teams were willing to travel to Europe for the 1934 World Cup and all North and South American nations except Brazil and Cuba boycotted the 1938 World Cup. Brazil was the only South American team to compete in both. World War II forced the cancellation of the 1942 and 1946 competitions, which Germany and Brazil had sought to host.

=== World Cups after World War II ===
The opening game of the Maracanã Stadium in Rio de Janeiro, Brazil, shortly before the 1950 FIFA World Cup

The 1950 World Cup, held in Brazil, was the first to include British football associations. Scotland, England, Wales, and Northern Ireland had withdrawn from FIFA in 1920, partly out of unwillingness to play against the countries they had been at war with, and partly as a protest against foreign influence on football. The teams rejoined in 1946 following FIFA's invitation. The tournament also saw the return of 1930 champions Uruguay, who had boycotted the previous two World Cups. Uruguay won the tournament again after defeating the host nation Brazil, in the match called "Maracanazo" (Portuguese: Maracanaço).

In the tournaments between 1934 and 1978, 16 teams competed in each tournament, except in 1938, when Austria was absorbed into Germany after qualifying, leaving the tournament with 15 teams, and in 1950, when India, Scotland, and Turkey withdrew, leaving the tournament with 13 teams. Most of the participating nations were from Europe and South America, with a small minority from North America, Africa, Asia, and Oceania. These teams were usually defeated easily by the European and South American teams. Until 1982, the only teams from outside Europe and South America to advance out of the first round were: United States, semi-finalists in 1930; Cuba, quarter-finalists in 1938; North Korea, quarter-finalists in 1966; and Mexico, quarter-finalists in 1970.

=== Expansion to 24 and 32 teams ===
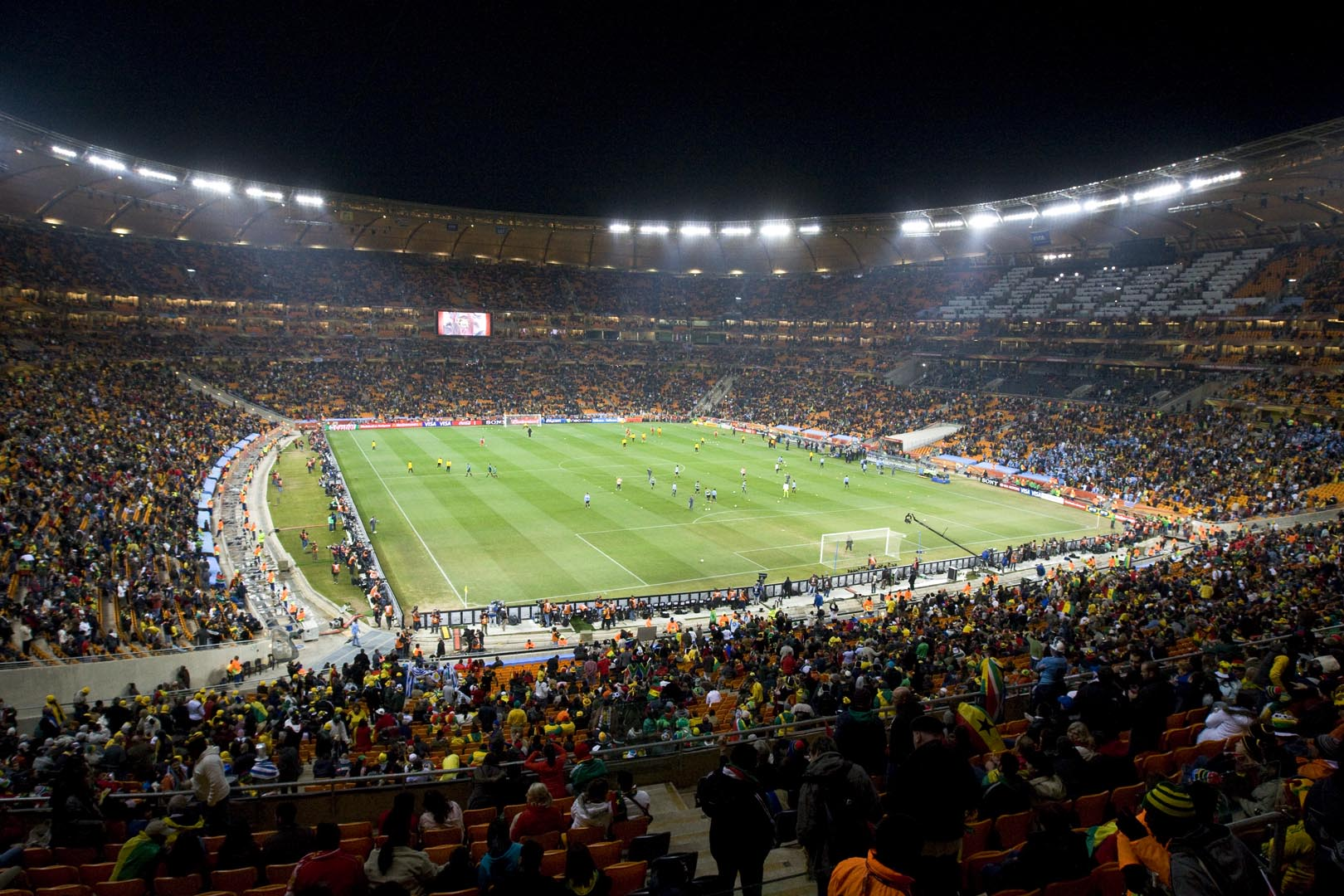
Inside Soccer City in Johannesburg, South Africa, during a match at the 2010 FIFA World Cup

The tournament was expanded to 24 teams in 1982 and then to 32 in 1998, allowing more teams from Africa, Asia, and North America to take part. Since then, teams from these regions have enjoyed more success, several having reached the quarter-finals: Mexico, quarter-finalists in 1986; Cameroon, quarter-finalists in 1990; South Korea, finishing in fourth place in 2002; Senegal and USA, both quarter-finalists in 2002; Ghana, quarter-finalists in 2010; Costa Rica, quarter-finalists in 2014; and Morocco, finishing in fourth place in 2022. European and South American teams continue to dominate; e.g., the quarter-finalists in 1994, 1998, 2006, and 2018 were all from Europe or South America, as the finalists of all tournaments have been.

Two hundred teams entered the 2002 FIFA World Cup qualification rounds. For the 2006 FIFA World Cup, 198 nations attempted to qualify. A record 204 countries entered qualification for the 2010 FIFA World Cup.

=== Expansion to 48 teams ===
In October 2013, Sepp Blatter spoke of guaranteeing the Caribbean Football Union's region a position in the World Cup. In the edition of 25 October 2013 of the FIFA Weekly Blatter wrote that: "From a purely sporting perspective, I would like to see globalisation finally taken seriously, and the African and Asian national associations accorded the status they deserve at the FIFA World Cup. It cannot be that the European and South American confederations lay claim to the majority of the berths at the World Cup." Those two remarks suggested to commentators that Blatter could be putting himself forward for re-election to the FIFA Presidency.

Following the magazine's publication, Blatter's would-be opponent for the FIFA Presidency, UEFA President Michel Platini, responded that he intended to extend the World Cup to 40 national associations, increasing the number of participants by eight. Platini said that he would allocate an additional berth to UEFA, two each to the Asian Football Confederation and the Confederation of African Football, two shared between CONCACAF and CONMEBOL, and a guaranteed place for the Oceania Football Confederation. Platini was clear about why he wanted to expand the World Cup. He said: "[The World Cup is] not based on the quality of the teams because you don't have the best 32 at the World Cup ... but it's a good compromise. ... It's a political matter so why not have more Africans? The competition is to bring all the people of all the world. If you don't give the possibility to participate, they don't improve." In October 2016, FIFA president Gianni Infantino stated his support for a 48-team World Cup in 2026. On 10 January 2017, FIFA confirmed the 2026 World Cup would have 48 finalist teams.

=== 2015 FIFA corruption case ===
By May 2015, the games were under a particularly dark cloud because of the 2015 FIFA corruption case, allegations and criminal charges of bribery, fraud and money laundering to corrupt the issuing of media and marketing rights (rigged bids) for FIFA games, with FIFA officials accused of taking bribes totalling more than US$150 million over 24 years. In late May, the U.S. Department of Justice announced a 47-count indictment with charges of racketeering, wire fraud and money laundering conspiracy against 14 people. Arrests of over a dozen FIFA officials were made since that time, particularly on 29 May and 3 December. By the end of May 2015, a total of nine FIFA officials and five executives of sports and broadcasting markets had already been charged on corruption. At the time, FIFA president Sepp Blatter announced he would relinquish his position in February 2016.

On 4 June 2015, Chuck Blazer while co-operating with the FBI and the Swiss authorities admitted that he and the other members of FIFA's then-executive committee were bribed in order to promote the 1998 and 2010 World Cups. On 10 June 2015, Swiss authorities seized computer data from the offices of Sepp Blatter. The same day, FIFA postponed the bidding process for the 2026 FIFA World Cup in light of the allegations surrounding bribery in the awarding of the 2018 and 2022 tournaments. Then-secretary general Jérôme Valcke stated, "Due to the situation, I think it's nonsense to start any bidding process for the time being." On 28 October 2015, Blatter and FIFA VP Michel Platini, a potential candidate for presidency, were suspended for 90 days; both maintained their innocence in statements made to the news media.

On 3 December 2015 two FIFA vice-presidents were arrested on suspicion of bribery in the same Zurich hotel where seven FIFA officials had been arrested in May. An additional 16 indictments by the US Department of Justice were announced on the same day.

=== Biennial World Cup proposition ===
A biennial World Cup plan was first proposed by the Saudi Arabian Football Federation at the 71st FIFA Congress on 21 May 2021 and prominently backed by former Arsenal manager Arsène Wenger and national federations in Africa and Asia. Continental confederations such as UEFA and CONMEBOL are not on board with the plan but, in total, the idea is supported by over 3/4 of the 211 member associations of FIFA.

=== Other FIFA tournaments ===
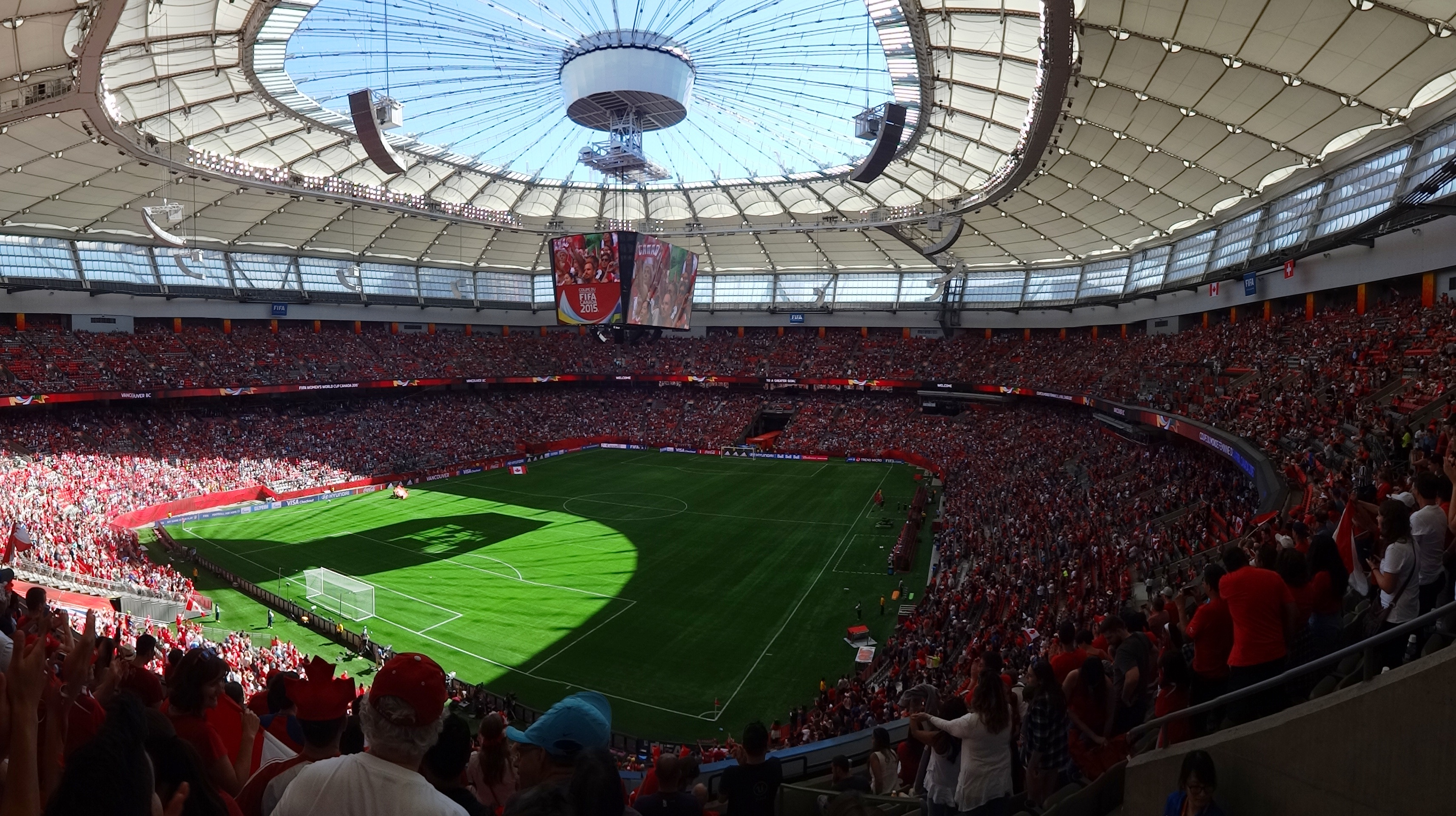
BC Place in Vancouver hosting a 2015 Women's World Cup match.

An equivalent tournament for women's football, the FIFA Women's World Cup, was first held in 1991 in China. The women's tournament is smaller in scale and profile than the men's, but is growing; the number of entrants for the 2007 tournament was 120, more than double that of 1991.

Men's football has been included in every Summer Olympic Games except 1896 and 1932. Unlike many other sports, the men's football tournament at the Olympics is not a top-level tournament, and since 1992, an under-23 tournament with each team allowed three over-age players. Women's football made its Olympic debut in 1996.

The FIFA Confederations Cup was a tournament held one year before the World Cup at the World Cup host nation(s) as a dress rehearsal for the upcoming World Cup. It was contested by the winners of each of the six FIFA confederation championships, along with the FIFA World Cup champion and the host country. The first edition took place in 1992 and the last edition was played in 2017. In March 2019, FIFA confirmed that the tournament would no longer be active owing to an expansion of the FIFA Club World Cup in 2021.

FIFA also organises international tournaments for youth football (FIFA U-20 World Cup, FIFA U-17 World Cup, FIFA U-20 Women's World Cup, FIFA U-17 Women's World Cup), club football (FIFA Club World Cup, FIFA Women's Club World Cup (starting in 2028), FIFA Intercontinental Cup, FIFA Women's Champions Cup), and football variants such as futsal (FIFA Futsal World Cup, FIFA Futsal Women's World Cup) and beach soccer (FIFA Beach Soccer World Cup), the latter not having a women's version. The FIFA U-20 Women's World Cup is held biannually, including the year before each Women's World Cup. Both tournaments were awarded in a single bidding process on three occasions, with the U-20 tournament serving as a dress rehearsal for the larger competition each time (2010, 2014 and 2018).

== Trophy ==
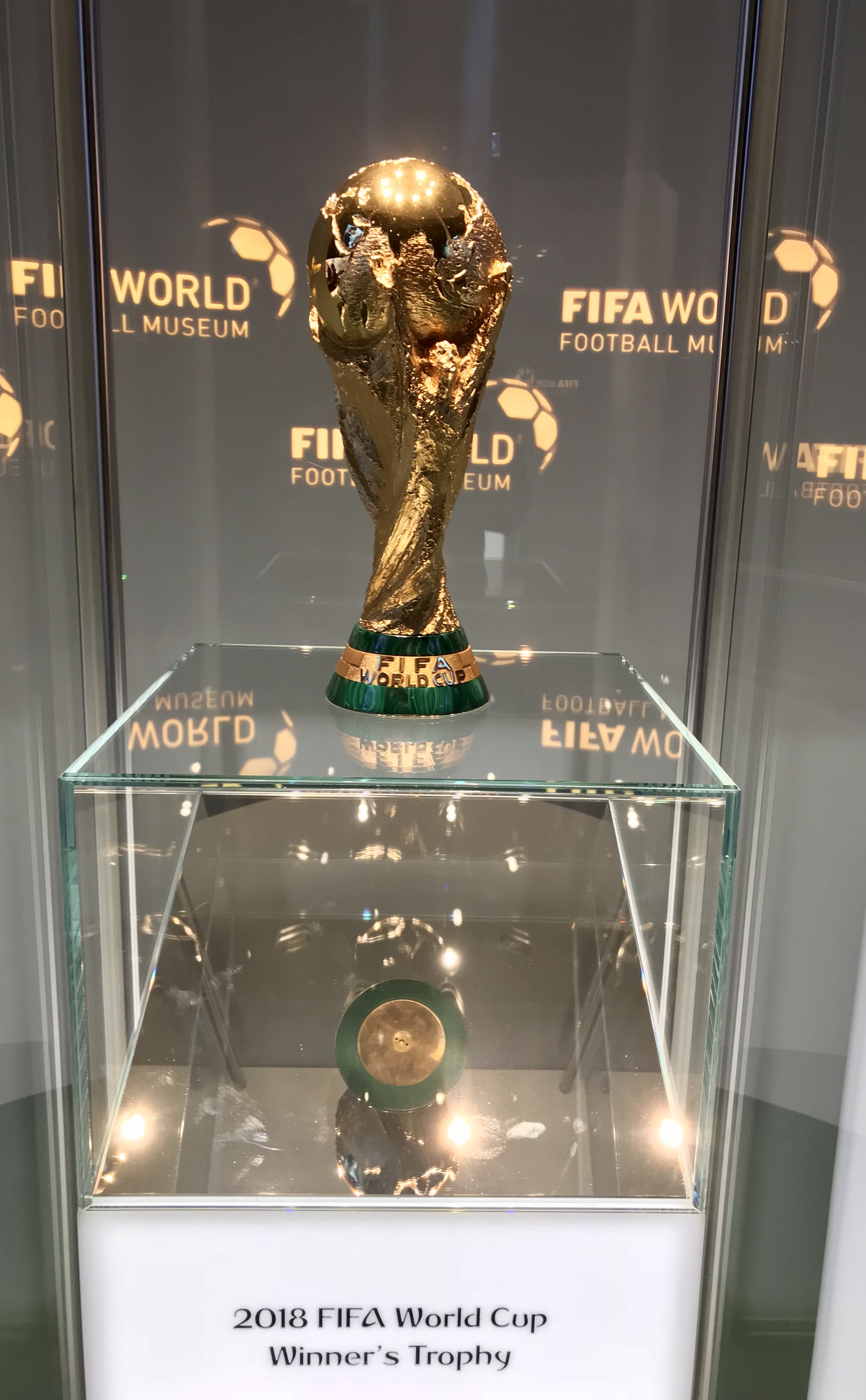
The current trophy, first awarded in 1974

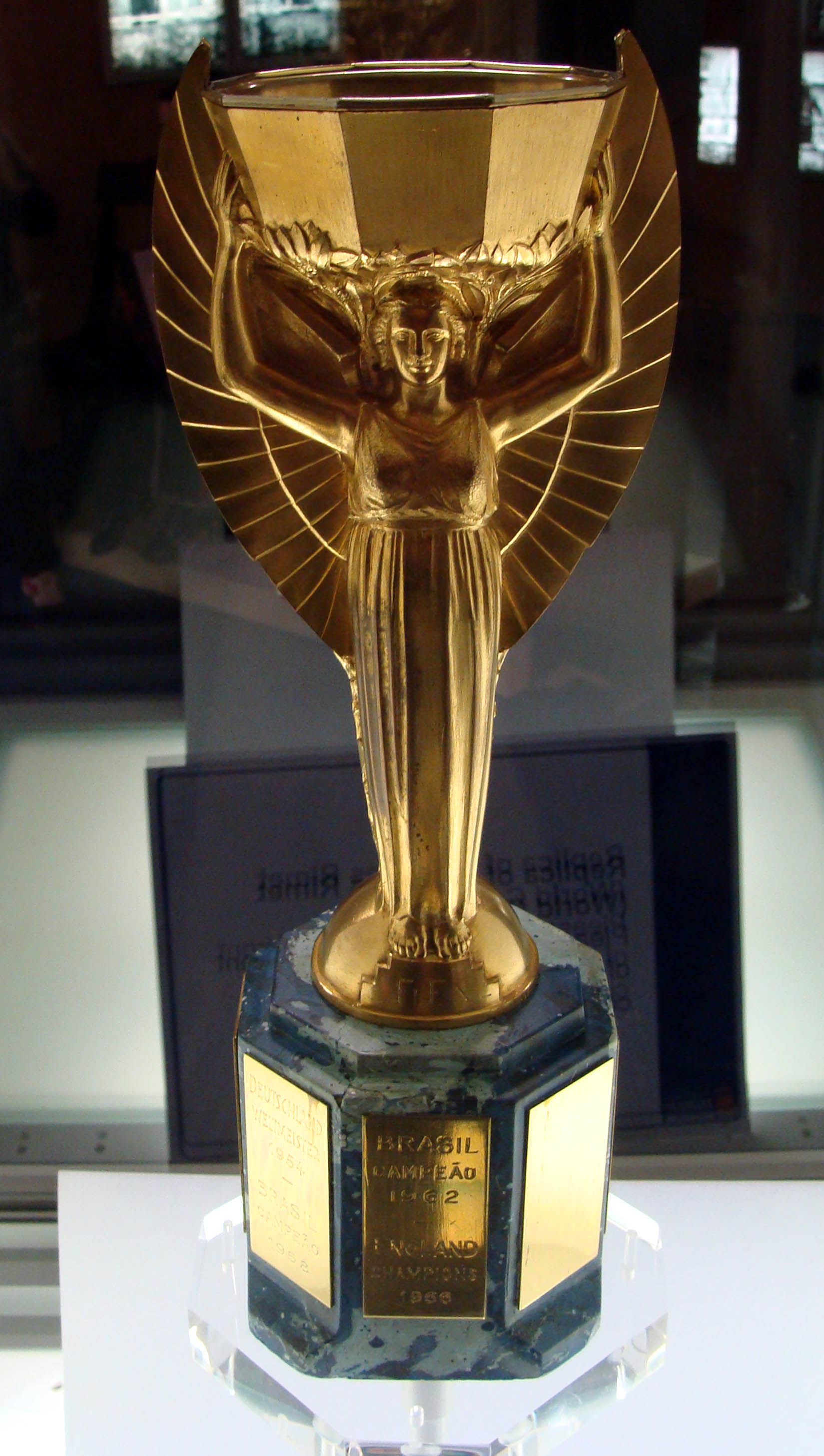
The Jules Rimet trophy, awarded from 1930 to 1970

From 1930 to 1970, the Jules Rimet Trophy was awarded to the World Cup winning team. It was originally simply known as the World Cup or Coupe du Monde, but in 1946 it was renamed after the FIFA president Jules Rimet who set up the first tournament. In 1970, Brazil's third victory in the tournament entitled them to keep the trophy permanently. However, the trophy was stolen in 1983 and has never been recovered, apparently melted down by the thieves.

After 1970, a new trophy, known as the FIFA World Cup Trophy, was designed. The experts of FIFA, coming from seven countries, evaluated the 53 presented models, finally opting for the work of the Italian designer Silvio Gazzaniga. The new trophy is 36 cm (14.2 in) high, made of solid 18 carat (75%) gold and weighs 6.175 kg (13.6 lb).

The base contains two layers of semi-precious malachite while the bottom side of the trophy bears the engraved year and name of each FIFA World Cup winner since 1974. The description of the trophy by Gazzaniga was: "The lines spring out from the base, rising in spirals, stretching out to receive the world. From the remarkable dynamic tensions of the compact body of the sculpture rise the figures of two athletes at the stirring moment of victory."

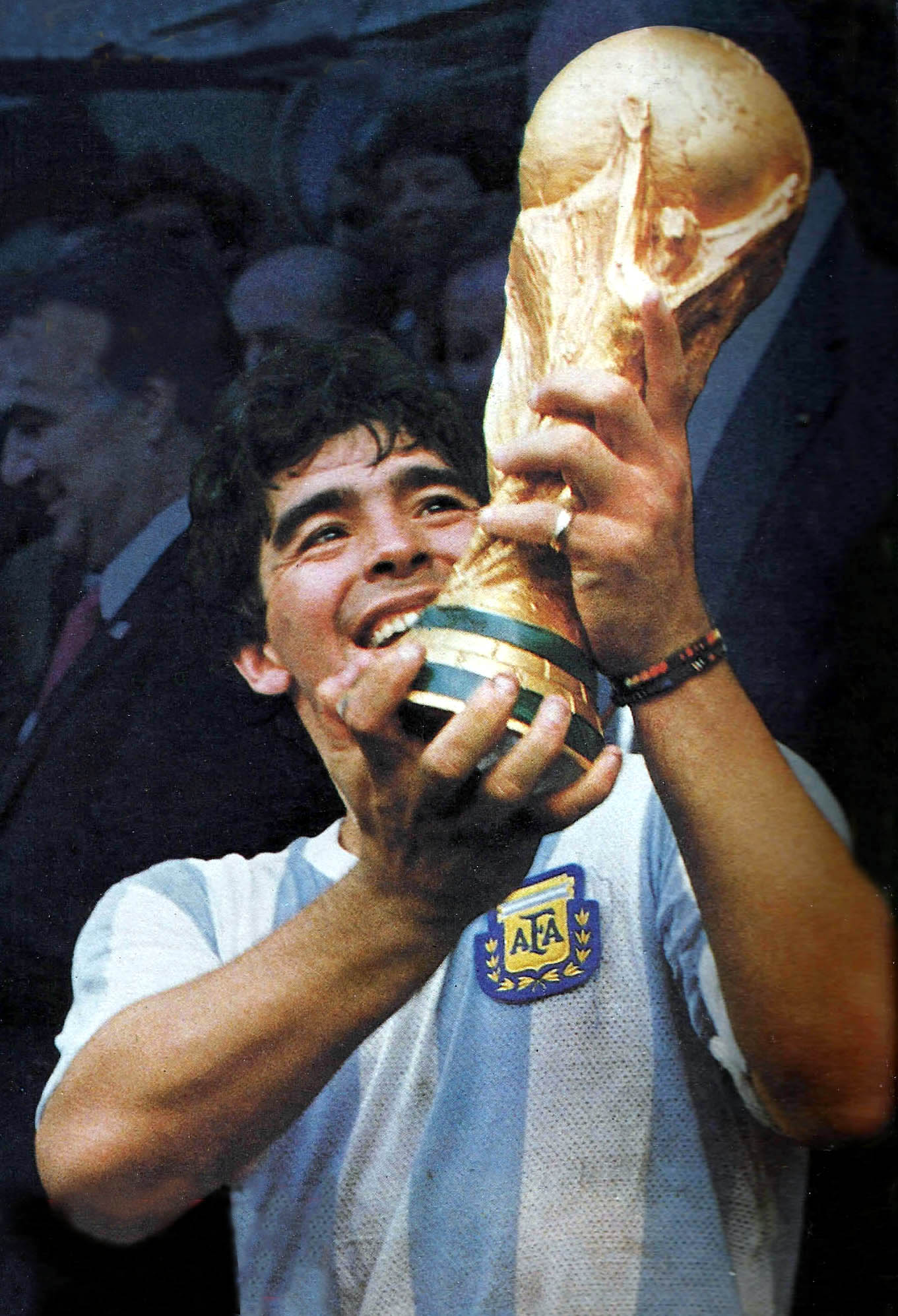
Diego Maradona with the current trophy in 1986.

This new trophy is not awarded to the winning nation permanently. World Cup winners retain the trophy only until the post-match celebration is finished. They are awarded a gold-plated replica rather than the solid gold original immediately afterwards.

All members (players, coaches, and managers) of the top three teams receive medals with an insignia of the World Cup Trophy; winners' (gold), runners-up (silver), and third-place (bronze). In the 2002 edition, fourth-place medals were awarded to hosts South Korea. Before the 1978 tournament, medals were only awarded to the eleven players on the pitch at the end of the final and the match for third place. In November 2007, FIFA announced that all members of World Cup-winning squads between 1930 and 1974 were to be retroactively awarded winners' medals. Since 2006, winners of the competition are also awarded the right to wear the FIFA Champions Badge, up until the time at which the winner of the next competition is decided.

== Format ==
=== Qualification ===
Since the second World Cup in 1934, qualifying tournaments have been held to thin the field for the final tournament. They are held within the six FIFA continental zones (Africa, Asia, North and Central America and Caribbean, South America, Oceania, and Europe), overseen by their respective confederations. For each tournament, FIFA decides the number of places awarded to each of the continental zones beforehand, generally based on the relative strength of the confederations' teams.

The qualification process can start as early as almost three years before the final tournament and last over a two-year period. The formats of the qualification tournaments differ between confederations. Usually, one or two places are awarded to winners of intercontinental play-offs. For example, the winner of the Oceanian zone and the fifth-placed team from the Asian zone entered a play-off for a spot in the 2010 World Cup. From the 1938 World Cup onwards, host nations receive automatic qualification to the final tournament. This right was also granted to the defending champions between 1938 and 2002, but was withdrawn from the 2006 FIFA World Cup onward, requiring the champions to qualify, as previous defending champions had uncompetitive performances at subsequent editions of the FIFA World Cup. Brazil, winners in 2002, were the first defending champions to play qualifying matches.

=== Final tournament ===
The final tournament format since 2026 has had 48 national teams competing over the course of a month in the host nations. There are two stages: the group stage, followed by the knockout stage. In the group stage, teams compete within twelve groups of four teams each. Twelve teams are seeded, including the hosts, with the other seeded teams selected using a formula based on the FIFA World Rankings or performances in recent World Cups, and drawn to separate groups. The other teams are assigned to different "pots", usually based on geographical criteria, and teams in each pot are drawn at random to the eight groups. Since 1998, constraints have been applied to the draw to ensure that no group contains more than two European teams or more than one team from any other confederation.

Each group plays a round-robin tournament in which each team is scheduled for three matches against other teams in the same group. This means that a total of six matches are played within a group. The last round of matches of each group is scheduled at the same time to preserve fairness among all four teams. The top two teams from each group advance to the knockout stage in addition to the eight best third-placed teams. Points are used to rank the teams within a group. Since 1994, three points have been awarded for a win, one for a draw and none for a loss (before, winners received two points).

Beginning with the 2026 edition, if two or more teams are equal on points, the following criteria are used to determine the ranking:

1. Most points obtained in the group matches played between the teams concerned;
2. Superior goal difference in the group matches played between the teams concerned;
3. Most goals scored in the group matches played between the teams concerned;

If, after having applied criteria 1 to 3, teams still have an equal ranking, criteria 1 to 3 are reapplied exclusively to the matches between the teams who are still level to determine their final rankings. If this procedure does not lead to a decision, criteria 4 to 8 apply.

4. Superior goal difference in all group matches;
5. Most goals scored in all group matches;
6. Highest team conduct ("fair play") score in all group matches (only one deduction can be applied to a player or team coach/official in a single match):
  - Yellow card: −1 point;
  - Indirect red card (second yellow card): −3 points;
  - Direct red card: −4 points;
  - Yellow card and direct red card: −5 points;
7. Better position in the most recent FIFA Men's World Ranking;
8. Better position in progressively older FIFA Men's World Rankings until teams can be separated.

The knockout stage is a single-elimination tournament in which teams play each other in one-off matches, with extra time and penalty shoot-outs used to decide the winner if necessary. It begins with the round of 32 (or the second round), made up of the top two teams of the twelve groups and the eight best third-placed teams, followed by the last 16, the quarter-finals, the semi-finals, the match for third place (contested by the losing semi-finalists), and the final. In March 2025, FIFA was reportedly considering a one-off expansion to 64 teams for the 2030 FIFA World Cup, the centennial anniversary of the FIFA World Cup.

== Hosts ==
=== Selection process ===
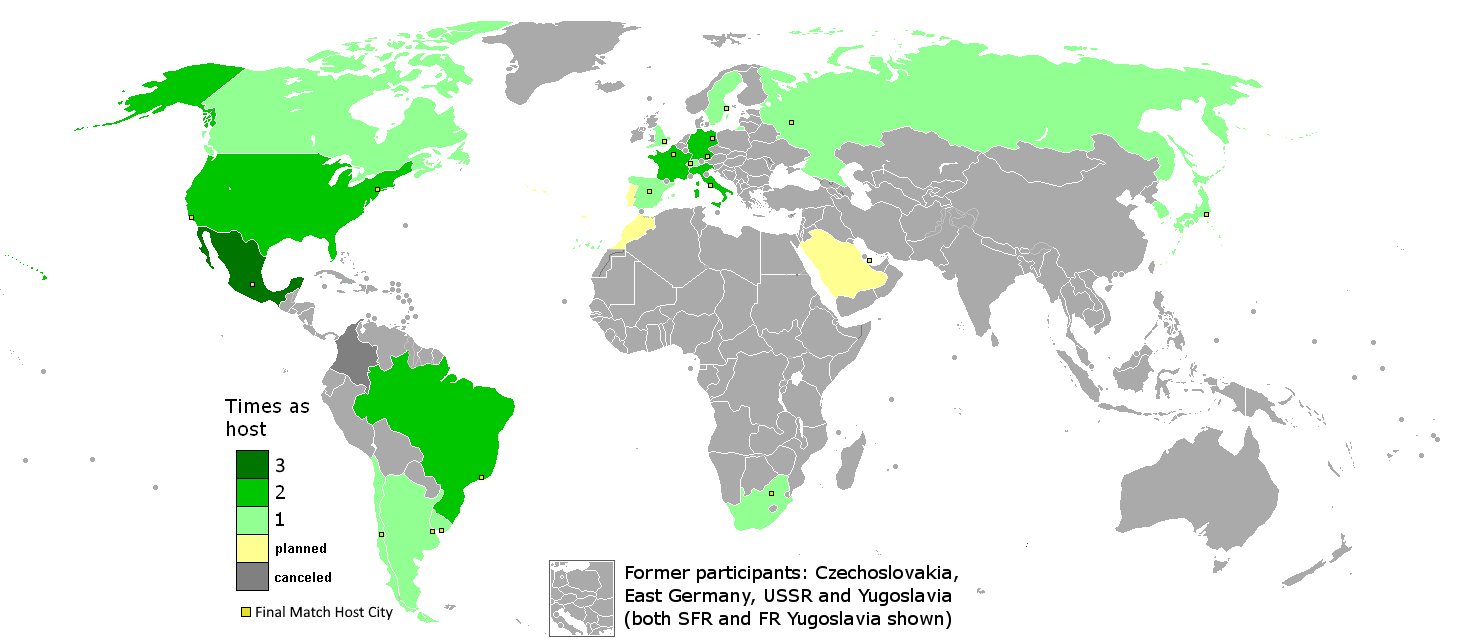
A map of FIFA World Cup final hosts, 1930–2026.

Early World Cups were given to countries at meetings of FIFA's congress. The locations were controversial because South America and Europe were by far the two centres of strength in football, and travel between them required three weeks by boat. The decision to hold the first World Cup in Uruguay, for example, reduced the number of competing European teams to four. The next two World Cups were both held in Europe. The decision to hold the second of these in France was disputed, as the South American countries had assumed that the location would alternate between the two continents. Both Argentina and Uruguay thus boycotted the 1938 FIFA World Cup.

Since the 1958 FIFA World Cup, to avoid future boycotts or controversy, FIFA began a pattern of alternating the hosts between the Americas and Europe, which continued until the 1998 FIFA World Cup. The 2002 FIFA World Cup, hosted jointly by South Korea and Japan, was the first one held in Asia, and the first tournament with multiple hosts. South Africa became the first African nation to host the World Cup in 2010. The 2014 FIFA World Cup was hosted by Brazil, the first held in South America since Argentina 1978, and was the first occasion where consecutive World Cups were held outside Europe.

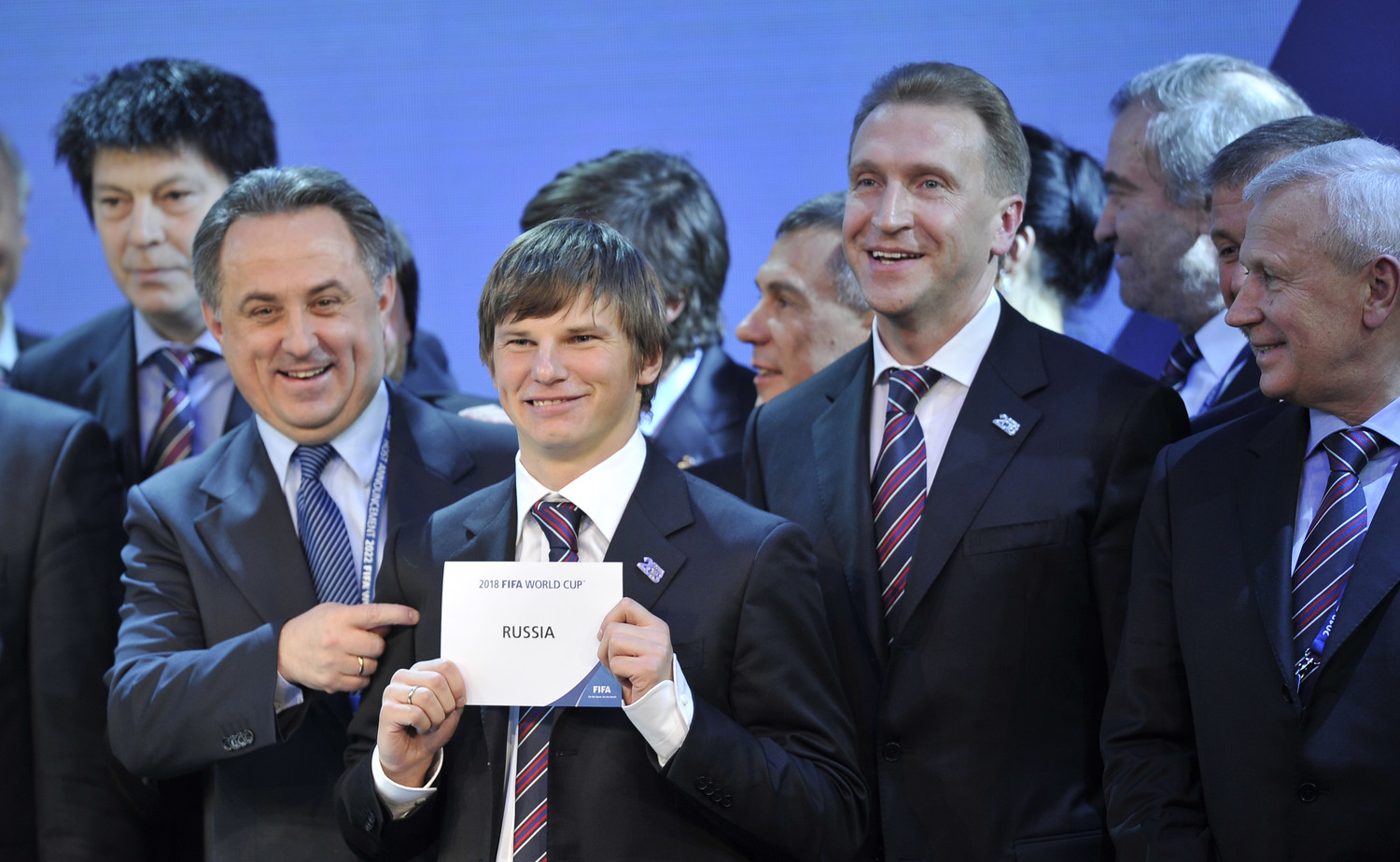
Russian delegates celebrate being chosen as the host of the 2018 FIFA World Cup.

The host country is now chosen in a vote by FIFA's Council. This is done under an exhaustive ballot system. The national football association of a country desiring to host the event receives a "Hosting Agreement" from FIFA, which explains the steps and requirements that are expected from a strong bid. The bidding association also receives a form, the submission of which represents the official confirmation of the candidacy. After this, a FIFA designated group of inspectors visit the country to identify that the country meets the requirements needed to host the event and a report on the country is produced. The decision on who will host the World Cup is usually made six or seven years in advance of the tournament. There have been occasions where the hosts of multiple future tournaments were announced at the same time, as was the case for the 2018 and 2022 World Cups, which were awarded to Russia and Qatar, with Qatar becoming the first Middle Eastern country to host the tournament.

For the 2010 and 2014 World Cups, the final tournament was rotated between confederations, allowing only countries from the chosen confederation (Africa in 2010, South America in 2014) to bid to host the tournament. The rotation policy was introduced after the controversy surrounding Germany's victory over South Africa in the vote to host the 2006 tournament. However, the policy of continental rotation did not continue beyond 2014, so any country, except those belonging to confederations that hosted the two preceding tournaments, can apply as hosts for World Cups starting from 2018. This is partly to avoid a similar scenario to the bidding process for the 2014 tournament, where Brazil was the only official bidder.

The 2026 FIFA World Cup was chosen to be held in the United States, Canada, and Mexico, marking the first time a World Cup had been shared by three host nations. The 2026 tournament featured the greatest number of matches (104) and teams (48). The US hosted 78 matches, including all matches from the quarter-finals onward, while Canada and Mexico hosted 13 games each.

=== Summary by confederation ===
Confederation	Times hosted	Hosts	Upcoming hosts
UEFA (Europe)	11	1934, Italy; 1938, France; 1954, Switzerland; 1958, Sweden; 1966, England; 1974, West Germany; 1982, Spain; 1990, Italy; 1998, France; 2006, Germany; 2018, Russia	2030, Spain & Portugal
CONMEBOL (South America)	5	1930, Uruguay; 1950, Brazil; 1962, Chile; 1978, Argentina; 2014, Brazil	2030, Argentina, Uruguay, and Paraguay
CONCACAF (North and Central America and Caribbean)	4	1970, Mexico; 1986, Mexico; 1994, United States; 2026, Canada, Mexico & United States	
AFC (Asia)	2	2002, South Korea & Japan; 2022, Qatar	2034, Saudi Arabia
CAF (Africa)	1	2010, South Africa	2030, Morocco
OFC (Oceania)	0	none	

=== Performances ===
Six of the eight champions have won one of their titles while playing in their own homeland, the exceptions being Brazil, who finished as runners-up after losing the deciding match on home soil in 1950 and lost their semi-final against Germany in 2014, and Spain, which reached the second round on home soil in 1982. England (1966) won their only title while playing as a host nation. Uruguay (1930), Italy (1934), Argentina (1978), and France (1998) won their first titles as host nations but have gone on to win again, while Germany (1974) won their second title on home soil.

Other nations have also been successful when hosting the tournament. Switzerland (quarter-finals 1954), Sweden (runners-up in 1958), Chile (third place in 1962), South Korea (fourth place in 2002), Russia (quarter-finals 2018), Canada (round of 16 in 2026), and Mexico (quarter-finals in 1970 and 1986) all have their best results when serving as hosts. So far, Qatar (2022, 2026) failed to advance beyond the first round.

== Broadcasting and promotion ==
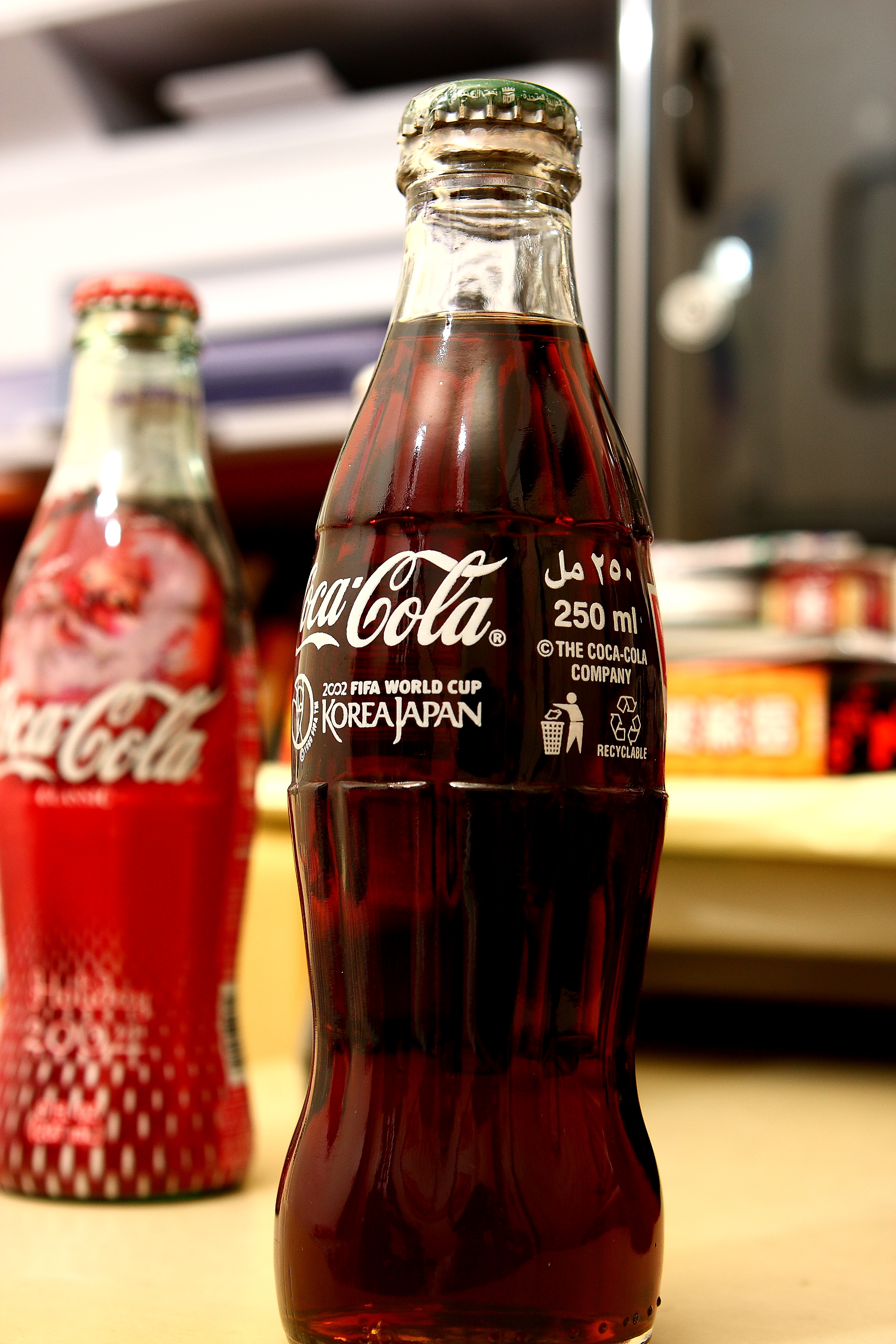
A Coca-Cola bottle promoting the 2002 World Cup in South Korea and Japan

The World Cup was first televised in 1954 and as of 2006 is the most widely viewed and followed sporting event in the world. The cumulative viewership of all matches of the 2006 World Cup was estimated to be 26.29 billion. 715.1 million individuals watched the final match of the tournament, almost a ninth of the entire population of the planet. The 2006 World Cup draw, which decided the distribution of teams into groups, was watched by 300 million viewers. The World Cup attracts major sponsors such as Coca-Cola, McDonald's and Adidas. For these companies and many more, being a sponsor strongly impacts their global brands. Host countries typically experience a multimillion-dollar revenue increase from the month-long event.

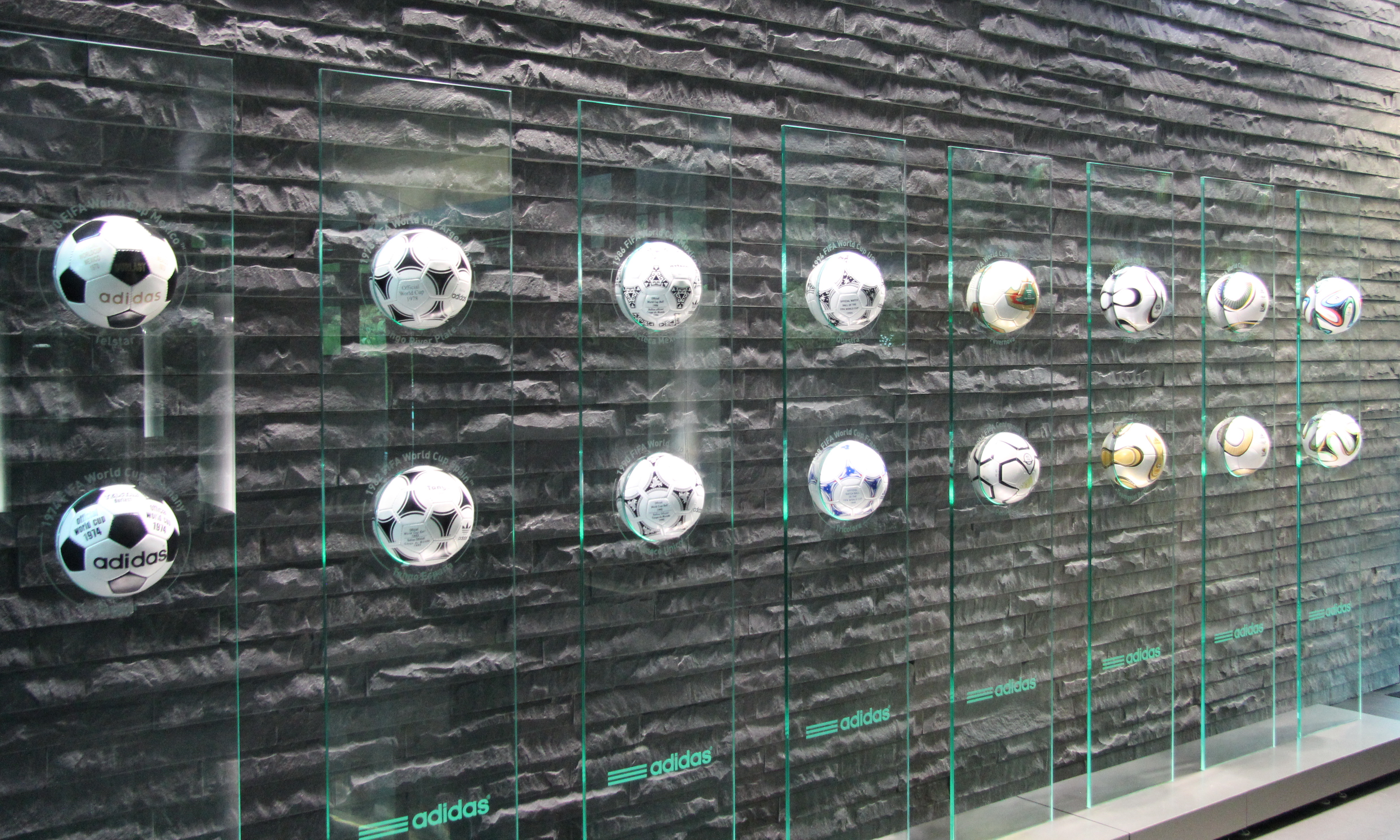
Manufactured by Adidas since the 1970 World Cup, official match balls displayed at FIFA headquarters in Zürich

Each FIFA World Cup since 1966 has its own mascot or logo. World Cup Willie, the mascot for the 1966 competition, was the first World Cup mascot. World Cups feature official match balls specially designed for each tournament. After Slazenger produced the ball for the 1966 World Cup, Adidas became the official supplier to FIFA. Each World Cup also has an official song, which have been performed by artists ranging from Shakira to Will Smith. Other songs, such as "Nessun dorma", performed by The Three Tenors at four World Cup concerts, have also become identified with the tournament.

Forming a partnership with FIFA in 1970, Panini published its first sticker album for the 1970 World Cup. Since then, collecting and trading stickers and cards has become part of the World Cup experience, especially for the younger generation. FIFA has licensed World Cup video games since 1986, which were sponsored by Electronic Arts until 2022.

== Economic impact ==
The FIFA World Cup is considered one of the most-watched events in the world. The 2018 World Cup, for example, was watched by 3.5 billion people—just under half of the world's population, rising to 5 billion in 2022. A new record is expected for 2026 due to the expansion of the field of participants. For 2026, the tournament is expected to contribute $40 billion to global gross domestic product (GDP). FIFA’s direct revenue from broadcast rights, sponsorship, hospitality, and licensing is projected to range between $10 and $11 billion for 2026. FIFA generated $4.8 billion in revenue from the 2014 tournament, and $6.1 billion from the 2018 tournament. The costs of hosting the tournaments are also rising steadily for host nations and have been estimated at over $200 billion in the case of Qatar 2022.

In addition to the direct economic effects, various studies have also identified an indirect impact on financial markets. For example, below-average returns were observed on U.S. stock markets during the weeks of the World Cup, and these returns remained statistically significant even after controlling for all other factors. Studies of 39 stock markets worldwide confirmed these findings. One possible explanation for this is the attention economy, according to which the World Cup distracts market participants, thereby reducing liquidity in the market for a limited time. In addition, World Cup victories were found to have a brief positive effect on the national stock market, possibly driven by euphoria. In some countries, such as Germany or Russia, it was also claimed that the government would postpone unpopular reforms or tax increases until the weeks of the World Cup, expecting less attention to be paid to them at that time.

== Results ==
Key

- a.e.t.: result/match won after/at extra time
- p: match won after penalty shoot-out

Ed.	Year	Host	Final			Third place game			Teams
Ed.	Year	Host	Champions	Score	Runners-up	Third place	Score	Fourth place	Teams
1	1930	Uruguay	Uruguay	4–2	Argentina	United States	(Note: There was no match for third place in 1930; the two losing semi-finalists are ranked according to their overall records in the tournament.)	Yugoslavia	13
2	1934	Italy	Italy	2–1 (a.e.t.)	Czechoslovakia	Germany	3–2	Austria	16
3	1938	France	Italy	4–2	Hungary	Brazil	4–2	Sweden	15
–	1942	Not held due to World War II							–
–	1946	Not held due to World War II							–
4	1950	Brazil	Uruguay	2–1 (Note: There was no official final in 1950, as for the only time the tournament concluded with a round-robin group of four teams, with the team finishing top of the group being declared the World Cup winners. On the final matchday, by coincidence, the top two teams in the group (and the only two who could win the title) played each other, while the other match was between the bottom two teams. Uruguay v Brazil is often considered the de facto final of the 1950 World Cup.)	Brazil	Sweden	3–1	Spain	13
5	1954	Switzerland	West Germany	3–2	Hungary	Austria	3–1	Uruguay	16
6	1958	Sweden	Brazil	5–2	Sweden	France	6–3	West Germany	16
7	1962	Chile	Brazil	3–1	Czechoslovakia	Chile	1–0	Yugoslavia	16
8	1966	England	England	4–2 (a.e.t.)	West Germany	Portugal	2–1	Soviet Union	16
9	1970	Mexico	Brazil	4–1	Italy	West Germany	1–0	Uruguay	16
10	1974	West Germany	West Germany	2–1	Netherlands	Poland	1–0	Brazil	16
11	1978	Argentina	Argentina	3–1 (a.e.t.)	Netherlands	Brazil	2–1	Italy	16
12	1982	Spain	Italy	3–1	West Germany	Poland	3–2	France	24
13	1986	Mexico	Argentina	3–2	West Germany	France	4–2 (a.e.t.)	Belgium	24
14	1990	Italy	West Germany	1–0	Argentina	Italy	2–1	England	24
15	1994	United States	Brazil	0–0 (a.e.t.) (3–2 p)	Italy	Sweden	4–0	Bulgaria	24
16	1998	France	France	3–0	Brazil	Croatia	2–1	Netherlands	32
17	2002	South Korea; Japan	Brazil	2–0	Germany	Turkey	3–2	South Korea	32
18	2006	Germany	Italy	1–1 (a.e.t.) (5–3 p)	France	Germany	3–1	Portugal	32
19	2010	South Africa	Spain	1–0 (a.e.t.)	Netherlands	Germany	3–2	Uruguay	32
20	2014	Brazil	Germany	1–0 (a.e.t.)	Argentina	Netherlands	3–0	Brazil	32
21	2018	Russia	France	4–2	Croatia	Belgium	2–0	England	32
22	2022	Qatar	Argentina	3–3 (a.e.t.) (4–2 p)	France	Croatia	2–1	Morocco	32
23	2026	Canada; Mexico; United States	Spain	1–0 (a.e.t.)	Argentina	England	6–4	France	48
24	2030	Morocco; Portugal; Spain (Note: Opening three games hosts: Argentina Paraguay Uruguay)							TBA
25	2034	Saudi Arabia							TBA

Notes

Members of the reigning championship team, Spain.

In all, 84 nations have played in at least one World Cup. (Note: FIFA considers that the national team of Russia succeeds the Soviet Union, the national team of Serbia succeeds the Yugoslavia/Serbia and Montenegro, and the national teams of the Czech Republic and Slovakia succeed the Czechoslovakia.) Of these, eight national teams have won the World Cup, and they have added stars to their badges, with each star representing a World Cup victory. Uruguay, however, chose to display four stars on their badge, representing their two gold medals at the 1924 and 1928 Summer Olympics, which are recognized by FIFA as World Championships, and their two World Cup titles in 1930 and 1950.

With five titles, Brazil are the most successful World Cup team and also the only nation to have played in every World Cup (23) to date. Brazil were also the first team to win the World Cup for the third (1970), fourth (1994) and fifth (2002) time. Italy (1934 and 1938) and Brazil (1958 and 1962) are the only nations to have won consecutive titles. West Germany (1982–1990) and Brazil (1994–2002) are the only nations to appear in three consecutive World Cup finals. Germany has made the most top-four finishes (13), medals (12), as well as the most finals (8).

Map of countries' best results. The inset map at the lower right shows former Eastern European participants (USSR, Yugoslavia, Czechoslovakia and East Germany).

=== Teams reaching the top four ===
Team	Titles	Runners-up	Third place	Fourth place	Top 4 total
Brazil	5 (1958, 1962, 1970, 1994, 2002)	2 (1950*, 1998)	2 (1938, 1978)	2 (1974, 2014*)	11
Germany^{1}	4 (1954, 1974*, 1990, 2014)	4 (1966, 1982, 1986, 2002)	4 (1934, 1970, 2006*, 2010)	1 (1958)	13
Italy	4 (1934*, 1938, 1982, 2006)	2 (1970, 1994)	1 (1990*)	1 (1978)	8
Argentina	3 (1978*, 1986, 2022)	4 (1930, 1990, 2014, 2026)			7
France	2 (1998*, 2018)	2 (2006, 2022)	2 (1958, 1986)	2 (1982, 2026)	8
Uruguay	2 (1930*, 1950)			3 (1954, 1970, 2010)	5
Spain	2 (2010, 2026)			1 (1950)	3
England	1 (1966*)		1 (2026)	2 (1990, 2018)	4
Netherlands		3 (1974, 1978, 2010)	1 (2014)	1 (1998)	5
Hungary		2 (1938, 1954)			2
Czech Republic^{2}		2 (1934, 1962)			2
Slovakia^{2}		2 (1934, 1962)			2
Sweden		1 (1958*)	2 (1950, 1994)	1 (1938)	4
Croatia		1 (2018)	2 (1998, 2022)		3
Poland			2 (1974, 1982)		2
Austria			1 (1954)	1 (1934)	2
Portugal			1 (1966)	1 (2006)	2
Belgium			1 (2018)	1 (1986)	2
United States			1 (1930)		1
Chile			1 (1962*)		1
Turkey			1 (2002)		1
Serbia^{3}				2 (1930, 1962)	2
Russia^{4}				1 (1966)	1
Bulgaria				1 (1994)	1
South Korea				1 (2002*)	1
Morocco				1 (2022)	1

* hosts
^{1} includes results representing West Germany (1954–1990)
^{2} includes results representing Czechoslovakia (1934–1990)
^{3} includes results representing Yugoslavia (1930–1990) and FR Yugoslavia / Serbia and Montenegro (1998–2006)
^{4} includes results representing the Soviet Union (1958–1990) - results achieved by the Soviet Union national football team prior to the dissolution of the Soviet Union in 1991. These results belong to the Soviet Union and are not attributable to the Russian Soviet Federative Socialist Republic, Russia or Russian Federation.

=== Best performances by confederations ===
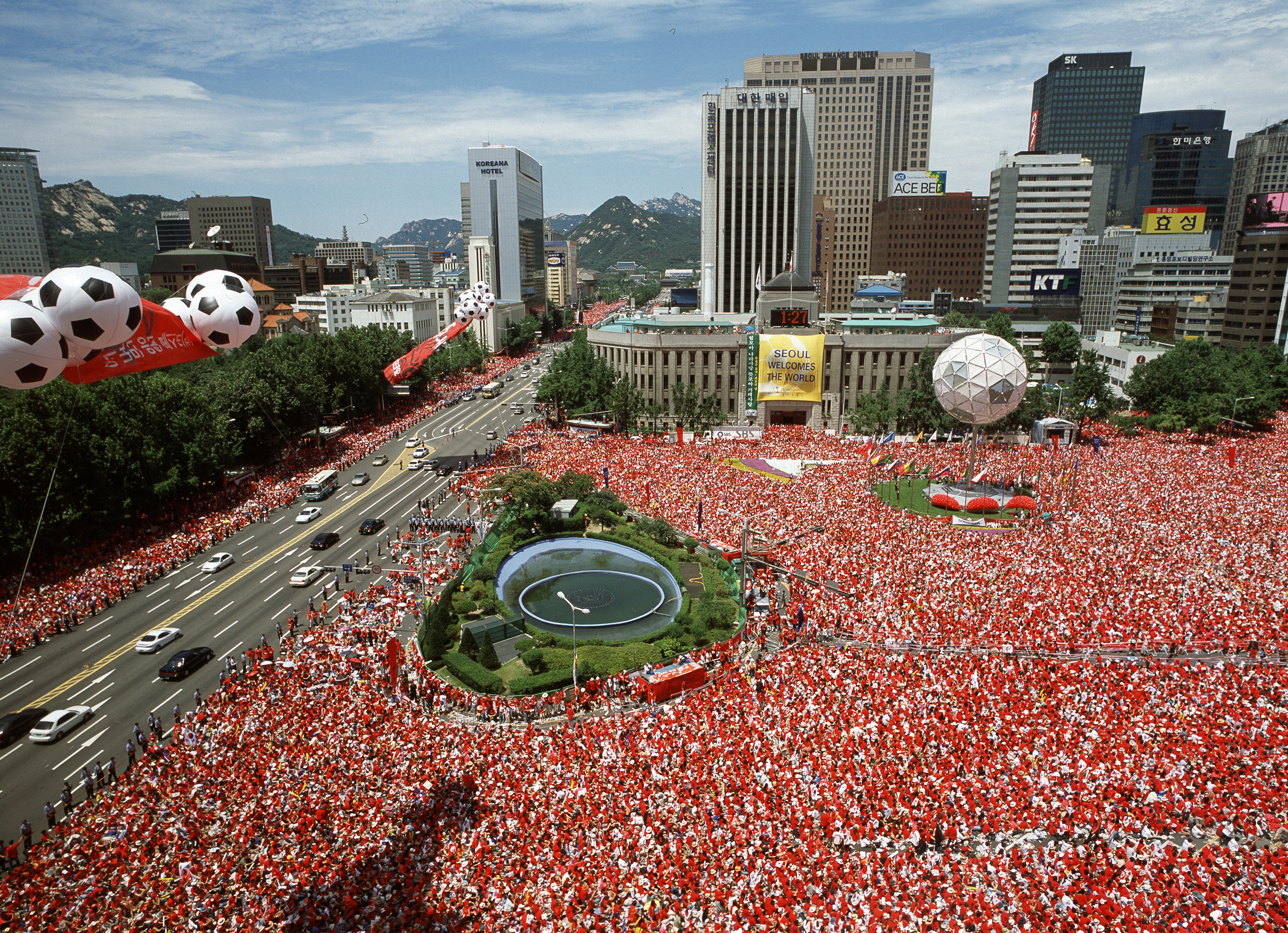
South Koreans watching their nation on the big screens in Seoul Plaza during the 2002 World Cup when they became the first Asian country to reach the semi-finals.

To date, the final of the World Cup has only been contested by teams from the UEFA (Europe) and CONMEBOL (South America) confederations. European nations have won thirteen titles, while South American nations have won ten. At the semi-final level, five different World Cups, (1934), (1966), (1982), (2006), and (2018), all hosted by UEFA nations, were all-European affairs. Only three teams from outside these two continents have ever reached the semi-finals of the competition: United States (North, Central America and Caribbean) in 1930; South Korea (Asia) in 2002; and Morocco (Africa) in 2022. Only one Oceanian qualifier, Australia in 2006, has advanced to the second round, a feat they later reaccomplished in 2022 and 2026. (Note: Australia's qualification in 2006 was through the Oceanian zone as they were a member of the OFC member during qualifying. However, on 1 January 2006, they left the Oceania Football Confederation and joined the Asian Football Confederation. In 2022 and 2026, they again reached the second round, albeit representing Asia.)

Brazil, Argentina, Spain and Germany are the only teams to win a World Cup hosted outside their continental confederation; Brazil came out victorious in Europe (1958), North America (1970 and 1994) and Asia (2002). Argentina won a World Cup in North America in 1986 and in Asia in 2022. Spain won in Africa in 2010, and North America in 2026. Germany won in South America (2014). Germany and Spain are the only European teams to have won in the Americas in 2014 and 2026 respectively. While Brazil and Argentina have won multiple titles outside of their home continent, Spain is the only UEFA team to do so. Spain is also the only European nation to have won all of its championships outside of UEFA-hosted tournaments. Only on five occasions have consecutive World Cups been won by teams from the same continent; the longest streak of tournaments won by a single confederation is four, with the 2006, 2010, 2014, and 2018 tournaments all won by UEFA teams (Italy, Spain, Germany, and France, respectively). Uruguay, Italy, England, Germany and France have all a World Cup on home soil (1930, 1934, 1966, 1974 and 1998 respectively)

Total times teams qualified by confederation
Confederation	AFC	CAF	CONCACAF	CONMEBOL	OFC	UEFA	Total
Teams	52	59	52	95	5	274	537
Top 32	2	9	3	5	0	13	32
Top 16	9	13	18	41	1	106	188
Top 8	2	5	5	37	0	111	160
Top 4	1	1	1	24	0	65	92
Top 2	0	0	0	16	0	30	46
4th	1	1	0	5	0	16	23
3rd	0	0	1	3	0	19	23
2nd	0	0	0	6	0	17	23
1st	0	0	0	10	0	13	23

== Records and statistics ==
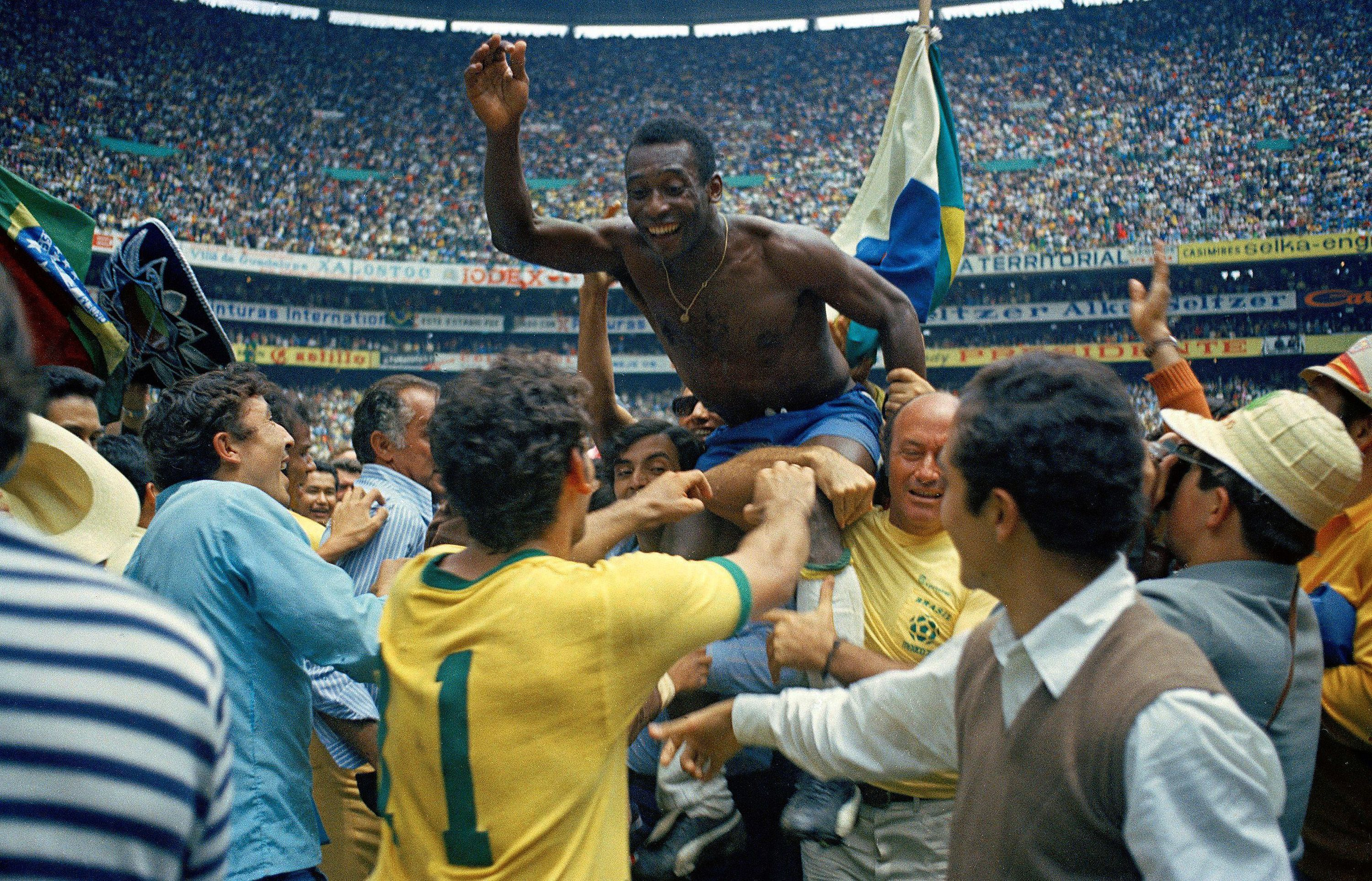
Pelé being held aloft after winning the 1970 World Cup final. He is the only player to win three World Cups.

Two players share the record for playing in the most World Cups; Lionel Messi (2006–2026) and Cristiano Ronaldo (2006–2026) have played the most World Cup tournaments overall with six each. (Note: Guillermo Ochoa has appeared but not played in six tournaments (see the List of players who have appeared in the most FIFA World Cups for a breakdown).) Mexico's Antonio Carbajal (1950–1966), Rafael Márquez (2002–2018), and Andrés Guardado (2006–2022), Croatia's Luka Modrić (2006, 2014–2026), and Germany's Lothar Matthäus (1982–1998) and Manuel Neuer (2010–2026) all played in five tournaments. Brazil's Djalma Santos (1954–1962), West Germany's Franz Beckenbauer (1966–1974), and Germany's Philipp Lahm (2006–2014) are the only players to be named to three World Cup All-Star Teams.

Kylian Mbappé of France (2018–2026) is the all-time top scorer with 22 goals, surpassing Lionel Messi of Argentina (2006–2026) and Miroslav Klose of Germany (2002–2014). Klose broke Ronaldo of Brazil's record of 15 goals (1998–2006) during the 2014 semi-final match against Brazil, while Messi equalled Klose's total with a hat-trick in Argentina's opening match of the 2026 tournament, and later broke Klose's record with two goals against Austria in the following group stage game. West Germany's Gerd Müller (1970–1974) is fifth, with 14 goals, just behind Ronaldo's 15 goals. The seventh-placed goalscorer, France's Just Fontaine, holds the record for the most goals scored in a single World Cup; all his 13 goals were scored in the 1958 tournament.

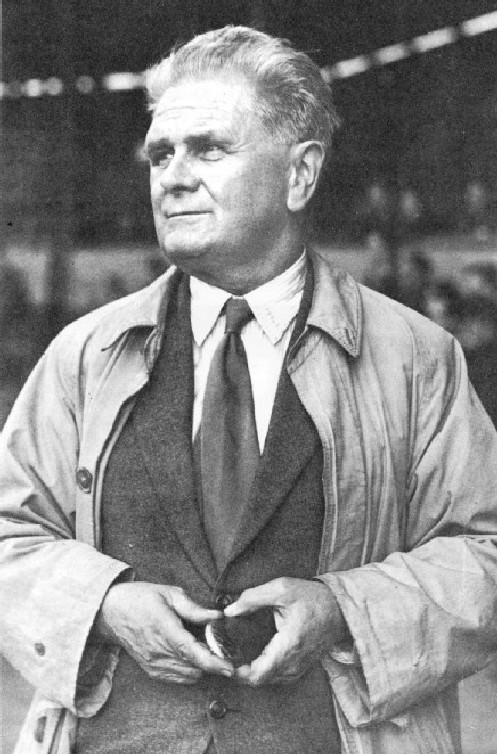
Vittorio Pozzo is the only person to win two World Cups as a coach.

In November 2007, FIFA announced that all members of World Cup-winning squads between 1930 and 1974 were to be retroactively awarded winners' medals. This made Brazil's Pelé the only player to have won three World Cup winners' medals (1958, 1962, and 1970, although he did not play in the 1962 final due to injury), with 20 other players who have won two winners' medals. Seven players have collected all three types of World Cup medals (winners', runners-up, and third-place); five players were from West Germany's squad of 1966–1974: Franz Beckenbauer, Jürgen Grabowski, Horst-Dieter Höttges, Sepp Maier, and Wolfgang Overath (1966–1974), Italy's Franco Baresi (1982, 1990, 1994) and the most recent has been Miroslav Klose of Germany (2002–2014) with four consecutive medals.

Brazil's Mário Zagallo, West Germany's Franz Beckenbauer and France's Didier Deschamps are the only people to date to win the World Cup as both player and head coach. Zagallo won in 1958 and 1962 as a player and in 1970 as head coach. Beckenbauer won in 1974 as captain and in 1990 as head coach, and Deschamps repeated the feat in 2018, after having won in 1998 as captain. Italy's Vittorio Pozzo is the only head coach to ever win two World Cups (1934 and 1938). All World Cup-winning head coaches were natives of the country they coached to victory.

Among the national teams, Brazil has played the most World Cup matches (119), appeared in the most World Cups (23), and has the most wins (79) and goals scored (247). Germany has appeared in the most finals (8), semi-finals (13) and quarter-finals (16). The two teams have played each other twice in the World Cup, in the 2002 final and in the 2014 semi-final.

=== Top goalscorers ===
Individual

Players in bold are still active in international football.

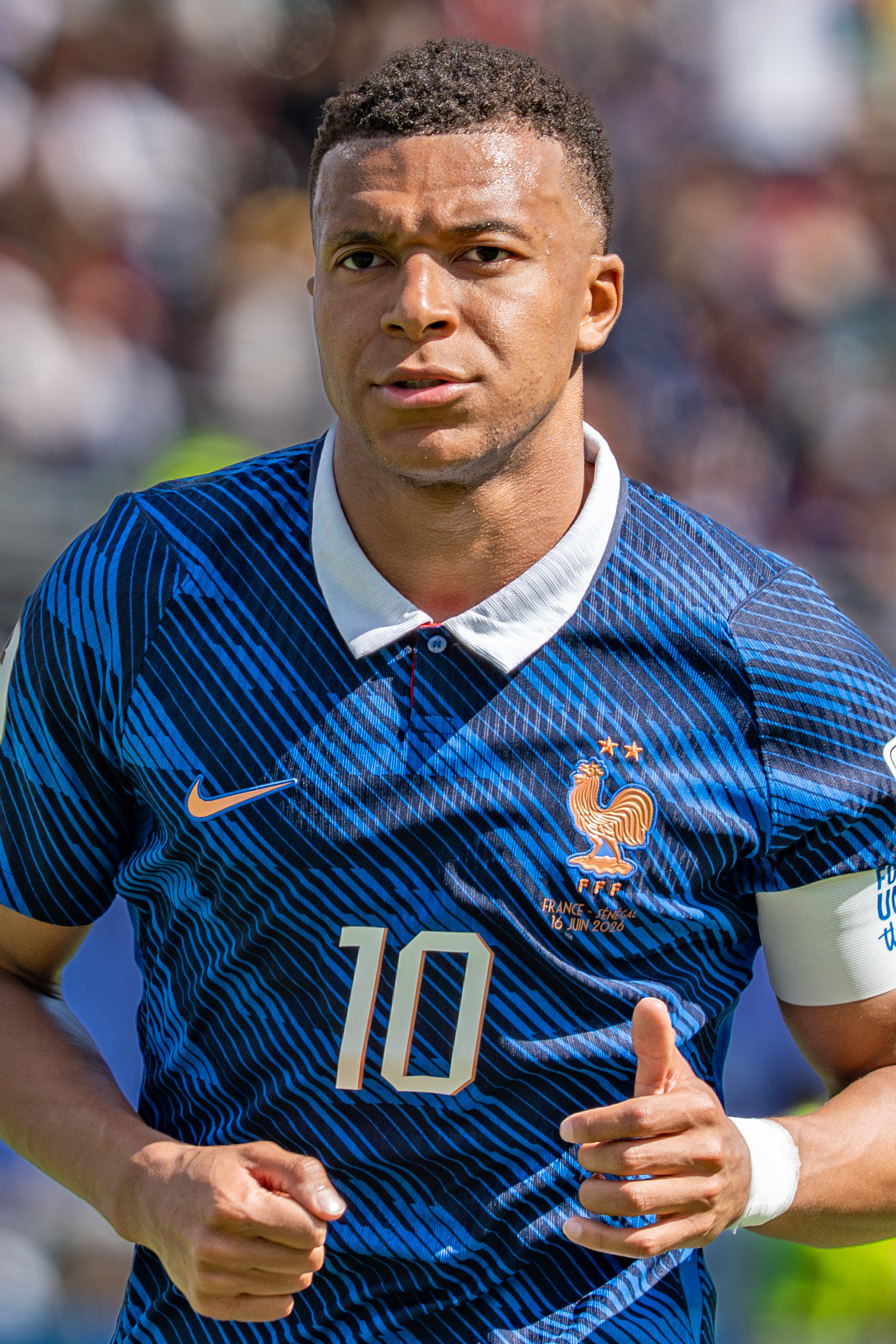
Kylian Mbappé is the top goalscorer in FIFA World Cup tournament history.

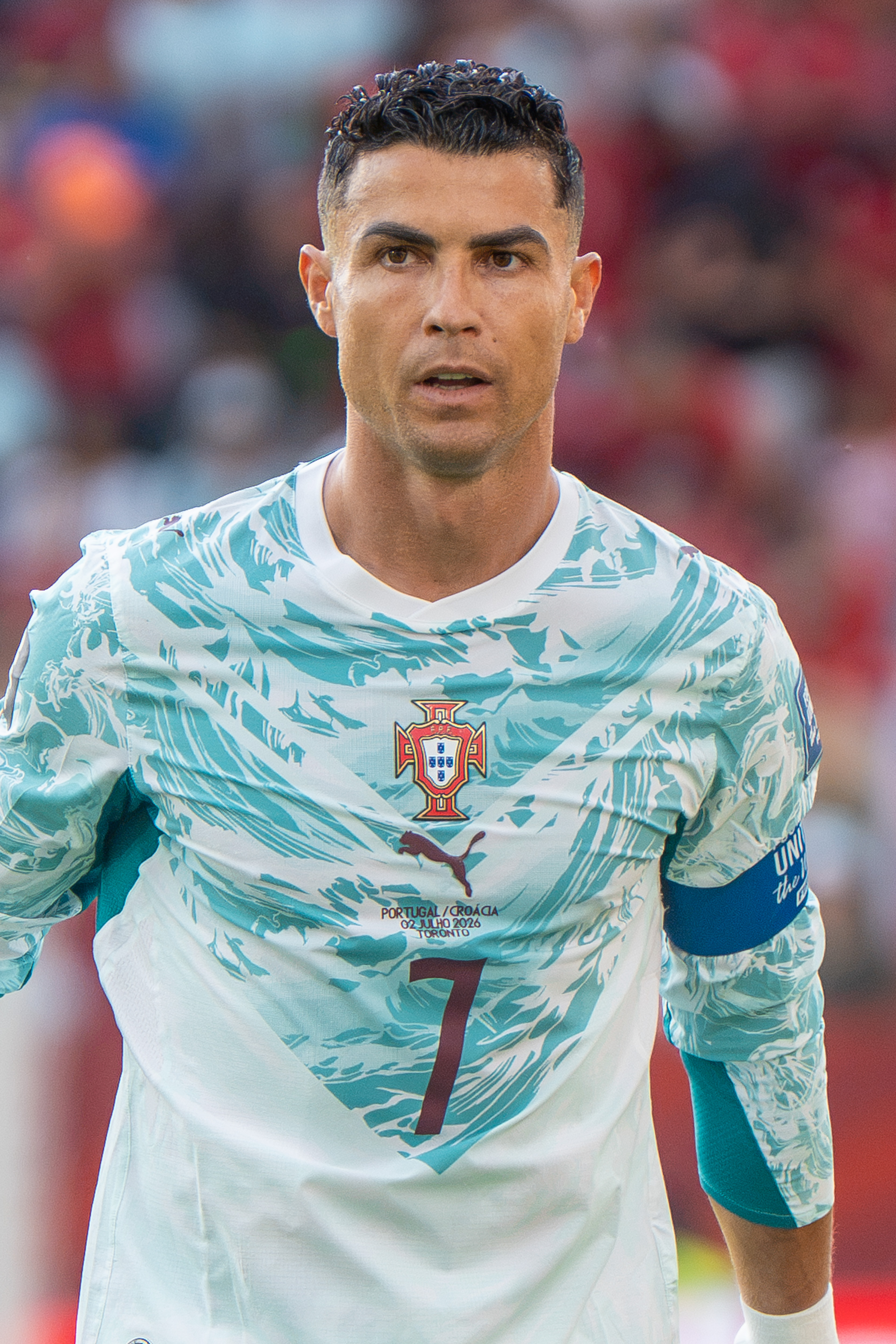
Cristiano Ronaldo is the only player to score in six different FIFA World Cup tournaments.

Rank	Player	Goals	Matches	Goals per game
1	(France) **Kylian Mbappé**	22	22	1.00
2	(Argentina) Lionel Messi	21	34	0.62
3	(Germany) Miroslav Klose	16	24	0.67
4	(Brazil) Ronaldo	15	19	0.84
5	(West Germany) Gerd Müller	14	13	1.08
5	(England) **Harry Kane**	14	18	0.78
7	(France) Just Fontaine	13	6	2.17
8	(Brazil) Pelé	12	14	0.86
9	(Hungary) Sándor Kocsis	11	5	2.20
9	(Germany) Jürgen Klinsmann	11	17	0.65
9	(Portugal) Cristiano Ronaldo	11	27	0.41

Country

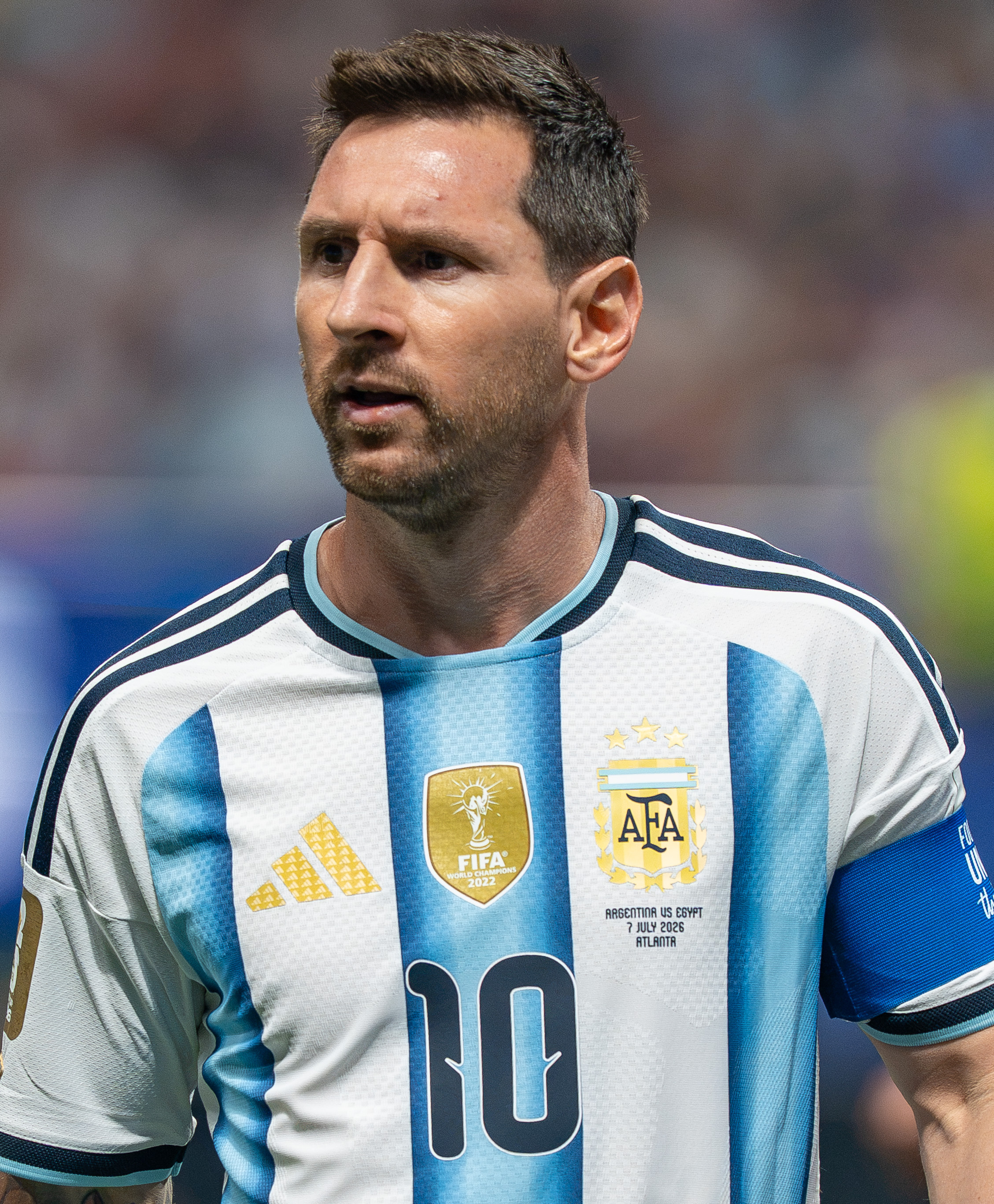
Lionel Messi played the most games in FIFA World Cup tournament history.

Rank	National team	Goals scored
1	Brazil	247
2	Germany	243
3	Argentina	171
4	France	156
5	Italy	128
6	England	124
7	Spain	122
8	Netherlands	107
9	Uruguay	92
10	Hungary	87
10	Sweden	87

== Awards ==
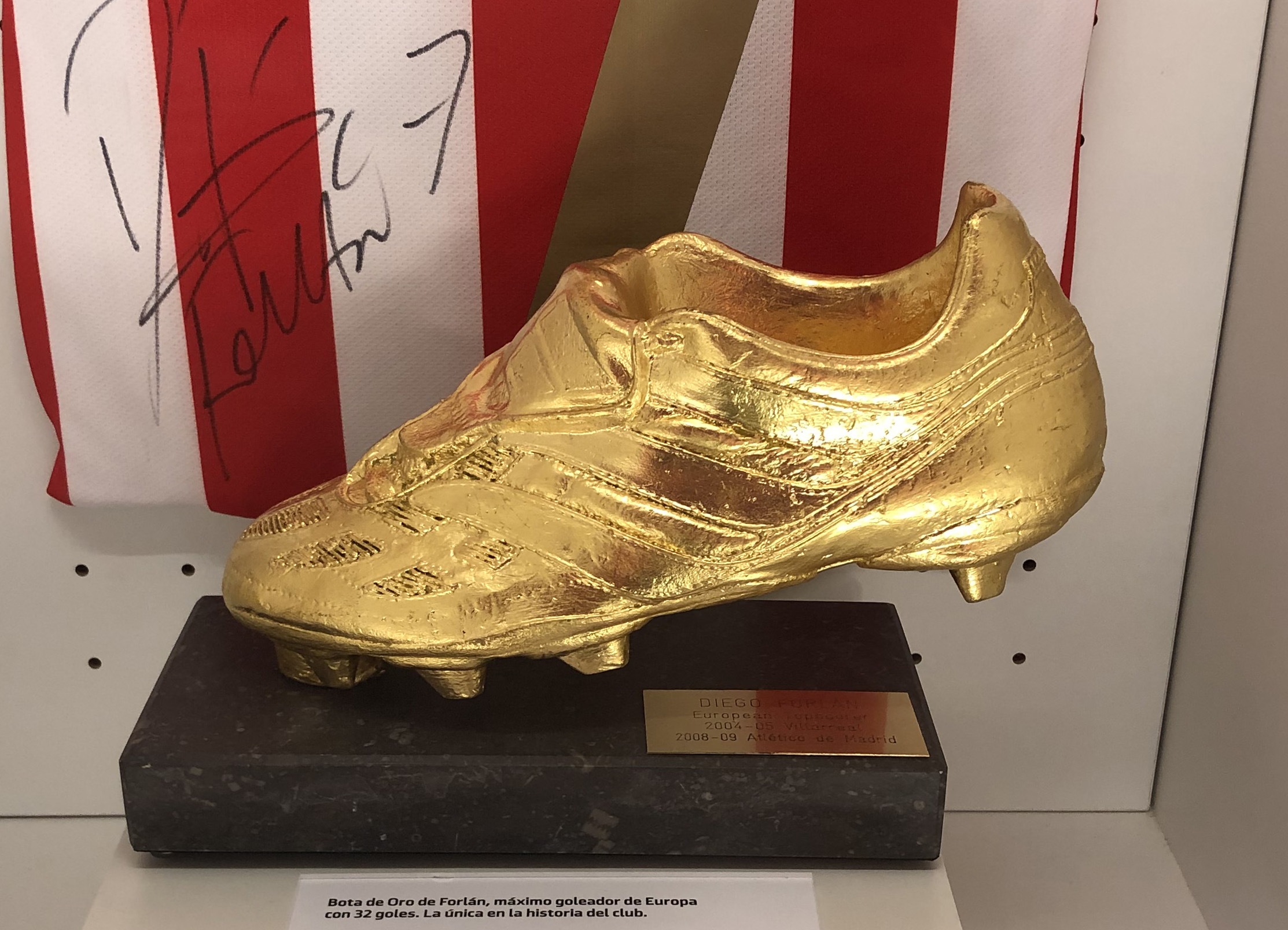
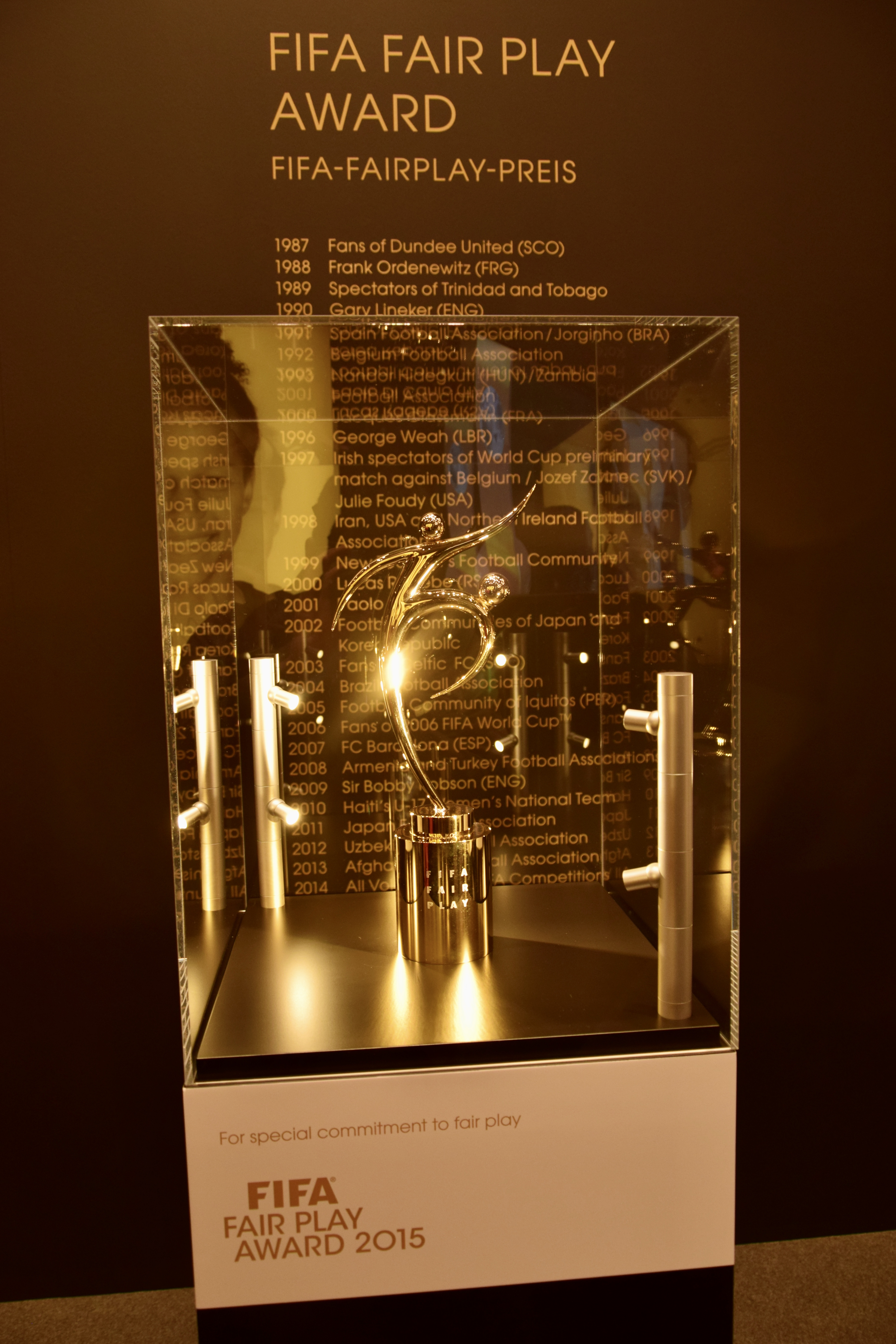
Left: The "Golden Boot" (named for its sponsor "Adidas Golden Boot", formerly known as the "adidas Golden Shoe" from 1982 to 2006) for top goalscorer, first awarded in 1982;
Right: "FIFA Fair Play Trophy" for the team that advanced to the second round with the best record of fair play, first awarded in 1970

At the end of each World Cup, awards are presented to the players and teams for accomplishments other than their final team positions in the tournament.

- There are five post-tournament awards from the FIFA Technical Study Group:
  - the Golden Ball (commercially termed "adidas Golden Ball") for best player, first awarded in 1982.
  - the Golden Boot (commercially termed "adidas Golden Boot", formerly known as the "adidas Golden Shoe" from 1982 to 2006) for top goalscorer, first awarded in 1982;
  - the Golden Glove (commercially termed "adidas Golden Glove", formerly known as the "Lev Yashin Award" from 1994 to 2006) for best goalkeeper, first awarded in 1994;
  - the FIFA Young Player Award (formerly known as the "Best Young Player Award" from 2006 to 2010) for best player under 21 years of age at the start of the calendar year, first awarded in 2006;
  - the FIFA Fair Play Trophy for the team that advanced to the second round with the best record of fair play, first awarded in 1970.
- There is currently one award voted on by fans during the tournament:
  - the Player of the Match (commercially termed "Michelob Ultra Superior Player of the Match", formerly known as the "Budweiser Man of the Match" from 2002 to 2018 and "Budweiser Player of the Match" in 2022) for outstanding performance during each match of the tournament, first awarded in 2002.
- There are two awards voted on by fans after the conclusion of the tournament:
  - the Goal of the Tournament (currently commercially termed "Hyundai Goal of the Tournament") for the fans' best goal scored during the tournament, first awarded in 2006;
  - the Most Entertaining Team during the World Cup final tournament, as determined by a poll of the general public.
- One other award was given between 1994 and 2006:
  - an All-Star Team comprising the best players of the tournament chosen by the FIFA Technical Study Group. From 2010 onwards, all Dream Teams or Statistical Teams are unofficial, as reported by FIFA itself.

World Cup	Golden Ball	Golden Boot	Goals	Golden Glove	Clean sheets	FIFA Young Player Award	FIFA Fair Play Trophy
1930 Uruguay	Not Awarded	(Argentina) Guillermo Stábile	8	Not Awarded	N/A	Not Awarded	Not Awarded
1934 Italy	Not Awarded	(Czechoslovakia) Oldřich Nejedlý	5	Not Awarded	N/A	Not Awarded	Not Awarded
1938 France	Not Awarded	(Brazil) Leônidas	7	Not Awarded	N/A	Not Awarded	Not Awarded
1950 Brazil	Not Awarded	(Brazil) Ademir	9	Not Awarded	N/A	Not Awarded	Not Awarded
1954 Switzerland	Not Awarded	(Hungary) Sándor Kocsis	11	Not Awarded	N/A	Not Awarded	Not Awarded
1958 Sweden	Not Awarded	(France) Just Fontaine	13	Not Awarded	N/A	(Brazil) Pelé	Not Awarded
1962 Chile	Not Awarded	(Hungary) Flórián Albert (Brazil) Garrincha (Brazil) Vavá (Soviet Union) Valentin Ivanov (Socialist Federal Republic of Yugoslavia) Dražan Jerković (Chile) Leonel Sánchez	4	Not Awarded	N/A	(Hungary) Flórián Albert	Not Awarded
1966 England	Not Awarded	(Portugal) Eusébio	9	Not Awarded	N/A	(West Germany) Franz Beckenbauer	Not Awarded
1970 Mexico	Not Awarded	(West Germany) Gerd Müller	10	Not Awarded	N/A	(Peru) Teófilo Cubillas	Peru
(West Germany) 1974 West Germany	Not Awarded	(Poland) Grzegorz Lato	7	Not Awarded	N/A	(Poland) Władysław Żmuda	West Germany
1978 Argentina	Not Awarded	(Argentina) Mario Kempes	6	Not Awarded	N/A	(Italy) Antonio Cabrini	Argentina
1982 Spain	(Italy) Paolo Rossi	(Italy) Paolo Rossi	6	Not Awarded	N/A	(France) Manuel Amoros	Brazil
1986 Mexico	(Argentina) Diego Maradona	(England) Gary Lineker	6	Not Awarded	N/A	(Belgium) Enzo Scifo	Brazil
1990 Italy	(Italy) Salvatore Schillaci	(Italy) Salvatore Schillaci	6	Not Awarded	N/A	(Socialist Federal Republic of Yugoslavia) Robert Prosinečki	England
1994 United States	(Brazil) Romário	(Russia) Oleg Salenko (Bulgaria) Hristo Stoichkov	6	(Belgium) Michel Preud'homme	2	(Netherlands) Marc Overmars	Brazil
1998 France	(Brazil) Ronaldo	(Croatia) Davor Šuker	6	(France) Fabien Barthez	5	(England) Michael Owen	England; France
2002 South Korea–Japan	(Germany) Oliver Kahn	(Brazil) Ronaldo	8	(Germany) Oliver Kahn	5	(United States) Landon Donovan	Belgium
2006 Germany	(France) Zinedine Zidane	(Germany) Miroslav Klose	5	(Italy) Gianluigi Buffon	5	(Germany) Lukas Podolski	Brazil; Spain
2010 South Africa	(Uruguay) Diego Forlán	(Germany) Thomas Müller	5	(Spain) Iker Casillas	5	(Germany) Thomas Müller	Spain
2014 Brazil	(Argentina) Lionel Messi	(Colombia) James Rodríguez	6	(Germany) Manuel Neuer	4	(France) Paul Pogba	Colombia
2018 Russia	(Croatia) Luka Modrić	(England) Harry Kane	6	(Belgium) Thibaut Courtois	3	(France) Kylian Mbappé	Spain
2022 Qatar	(Argentina) Lionel Messi	(France) Kylian Mbappé	8	(Argentina) Emiliano Martínez	3	(Argentina) Enzo Fernández	England
2026 Canada–Mexico–United States	(Spain) Rodri	(France) Kylian Mbappé	10	(Spain) Unai Simón	7	(Spain) Pau Cubarsí	Netherlands

== See also ==
- List of association football competitions
- FIFA World Cup records and statistics
- Football at the Summer Olympics
- FIFA Beach Soccer World Cup
- Non-FIFA international football
- List of FIFA World Cup finals
- CONIFA World Football Cup
- 2026 FIFA World Cup final halftime show
- FIFA Women's World Cup
- FIFA Confederations Cup
- FIFA World Cup awards
- FIFA Futsal World Cup
- FIFA U-20 World Cup
- FIFA U-17 World Cup
- FIFA Club World Cup

== Bibliography ==
- Glanville, Brian (2005). The Story of the World Cup. Faber. ISBN 0-571-22944-1.
