= Four stars above Uruguay's football crest =

Design element in Uruguay's football crest

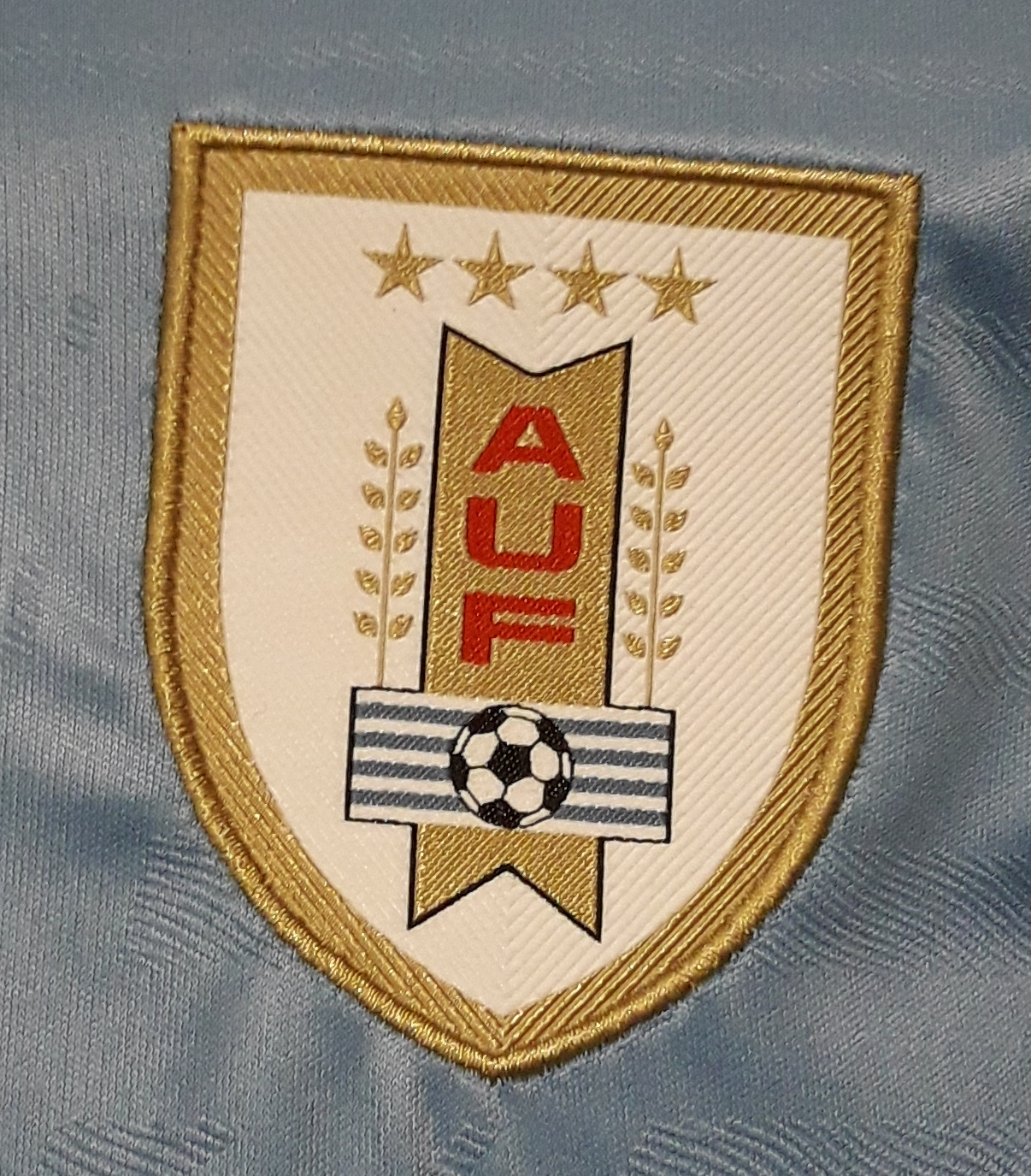
- The four stars above AUF's crest, here displayed on the Uruguay shirt

The four stars above Uruguay's football crest represent the four FIFA recognized world championships won by the Uruguay national football team in 1924, 1928, 1930, and 1950. From the outset, FIFA and global football associations have recognized the Olympic football tournaments of Paris 1924 and Amsterdam 1928 as open world championships, the only editions in history to be subsequently and officially accepted as equivalent in value to the FIFA World Cup.

FIFA and CONMEBOL at times separate Uruguay's two World Cups from the two Olympic titles, recognizing that they were two separate events.

== 1924 and 1928 Olympic football tournaments ==
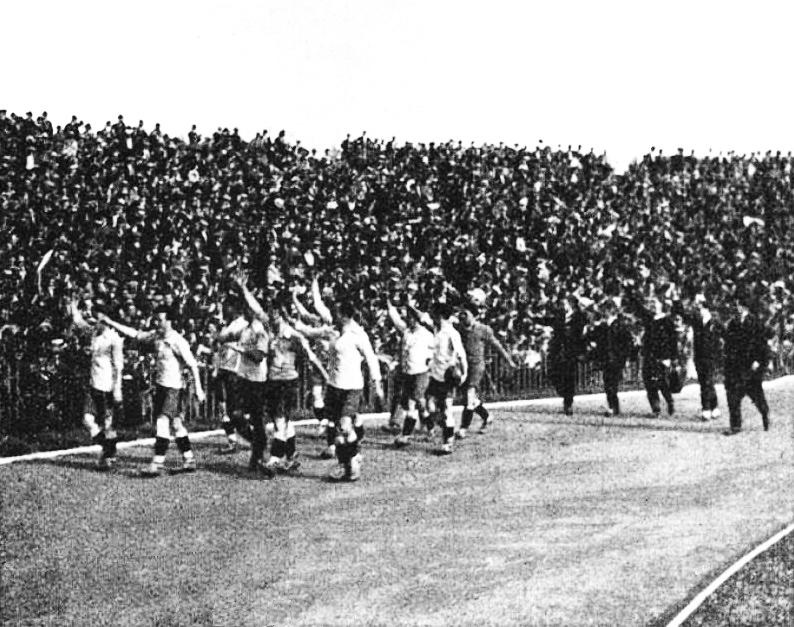
Uruguay performs football's first ever Lap of Honour after winning Olympic gold in 1924. This tradition would be later known in Spanish speaking countries as the "Vuelta Olimpica" (The Olympic Lap) in tribute to La Celeste's historic first non-amateur world championship

The 1924 and 1928 Olympic football tournaments had several distinctions that separate them from other editions organized before and after. Firstly, these championships were principally administered by FIFA, the French and Dutch football associations respectively, without obstructive involvement from the International Olympic Committee. Secondly, these two Olympic football tournaments were the first ones in history that were open to all players, including professionals. From the outset, FIFA, the football associations and media outlets from across the globe recognized the legitimacy of these Olympic football tournaments as being exceptional due to these "open" regulations. Also, before the outset of the tournament, FIFA President Jules Rimet and Henri Delaunay, one of the chief architects of the FIFA World Cup, stated that the winners of the 1924 Olympic football tournament would claim the “title of champion of the world”.

The FIFA Museum in Zürich, Switzerland also has several mentions of FIFA's recognition of the 1924 and 1928 Olympic football tournaments being officially recognized by them as open (non-amateur) senior world titles, equivalent to the FIFA World Cup.

== FIFA's uniform regulations ==
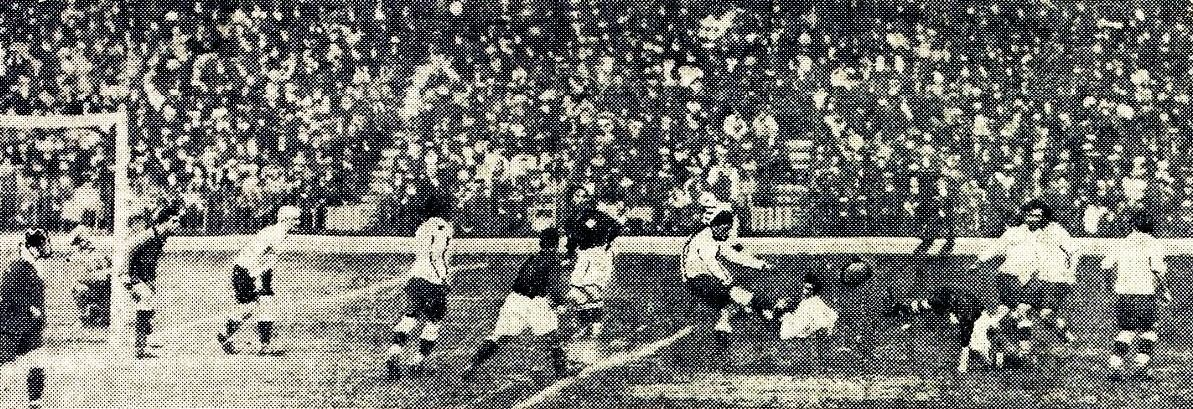
Uruguay and Switzerland dispute the first open world championship final in Colombes, 1924. La Celeste won 3–0 and captured their first of three consecutive world titles

FIFA has strict conditions for the adding of stars on a national team's football crest during the FIFA World Cup. Only teams that have won a World Cup (or a recognized equivalent) can display a five-pointed star on their badge.

Adhering these official FIFA guidelines, the Uruguay national football team has been permitted to wear their four stars on their crest in six consecutive World Cup appearances: 2002, 2010, 2014, 2018, 2022 and 2026. An example of FIFA not approving stars on a football crest occurred in 2018, when the Egyptian National Team had to remove their seven stars before the World Cup in Russia, representing the seven African Cup of Nations that they had previously won.

=== 1992 addition ===
In 1992, the Uruguay national football team successfully added four stars on their football crest for the first time with approval from FIFA. The request was put forward by Uruguayan football historian and journalist Atilio Garrido, who cited that in 1924, the AUF submitted their official reports to FIFA titled "Uruguay World Football Champion at the Olympics in Paris." In addition to this, in 1928, the Uruguayan association did the same thing, except this time calling their documents: "Olimpiada de Amsterdam, Uruguay campeón del mundo" ("Amsterdam Olympiad, Uruguay World Champions.") These reports were formally submitted to FIFA in 1925 and 1929, and were approved with no objections. In 1992, at the FIFA Congress in Zürich, Atilio Garrido successfully argued Uruguay's official standing as four-time senior (non-amateur) world champions recognized by FIFA as being: "inscribes itself in the continuity of what was officially registered by the directives of that time."

=== 2021 incident with Puma ===
In 2021, a leaked email was sent by Puma to the AUF, revealing that a FIFA employee had asked them to remove two of the stars on Uruguay's crest before an upcoming FIFA World Cup qualifier. The AUF organized a defence on the validity of their stars with several historians and primary documents that were later presented to FIFA, who soon after retracted any mentions of this request.

Uruguay were then permitted to use the 4 stars vs. Colombia on October 7, 2021. On 30 May 2022, Uruguay announced a new jersey for the 2022 FIFA World Cup with 4 stars approved for the fifth consecutive tournament (2002, 2010, 2014, 2018, 2022), confirming to their official standing as four-time senior (non-amateur) titles recognized by FIFA.
