= 2000 CR Vasco da Gama season =

Vasco da Gama
2000 season
- Chairman: Antônio Soares Calçada
- Manager: Joel Santana since 18 December (Oswaldo de Oliveira since 7 July until 17 December) (Tita (a.i.) since 12 June until 6 July) (Alcir (a.i.) since 1 June until 12 June) (Abel since 5 March until 1 June) (Antônio Lopes until 2 March)
- Stadium: São Januário; Maracanã
- Campeonato Brasileiro Série A: Knockout phase: Champions; League stage: 5th
- Copa do Brasil: Round of 16
- Campeonato Carioca: Runners-up; Taça Guanabara: Champions; Taça Rio de Janeiro: Runners-up
- FIFA Club World Championship: Runners-up
- Copa Mercosur: Champions
- Torneio Rio–São Paulo: Runners-up
- Top goalscorer: Romário (13)
Home colours	Away colours

The 2000 season was Club de Regatas Vasco da Gama 102nd year in existence, the club's 85th season in existence of football, and the club's 30th season playing in the Campeonato Brasileiro Série A, the top flight of Brazilian football.

== Players ==
=== Squad information ===
As of 18 January 2001.

No.	Name	Nationality	Position (s)	Date of Birth (Age)	Signed From
Goalkeepers
1	Helton	(Brazil)	GK	18 May 1978 (aged 22)	Youth system
12	Márcio	(Brazil)	GK	16 March 1971 (aged 29)	Youth system
24	Fábio	(Brazil)	GK	30 September 1980 (aged 20)	(Brazil) Cruzeiro (loaned from União Bandeirante)
Defenders
2	Jorginho	(Brazil)	RFB, DM, LFB, AM	17 August 1964 (aged 36)	(Brazil) São Paulo
3	Odvan	(Brazil)	CB	26 March 1974 (aged 26)	(Brazil) Americano
4	Júnior Baiano	(Brazil)	CB	14 March 1970 (aged 30)	(Brazil) Palmeiras
13	André Silva	(Brazil)	LFB	3 March 1973 (aged 27)	(Brazil) Atlético Mineiro
14	Valkmar	(Brazil)	CB	1 January 1977 (aged 24)	Youth system
15	Henrique	(Brazil)	CB, DM	16 July 1977 (aged 23)	Youth system
16	Géder	(Brazil)	CB	23 April 1978 (aged 22)	Youth system
22	Mauro Galvão	(Brazil)	CB	19 December 1961 (aged 39)	(Brazil) Grêmio
25	Maricá	(Brazil)	RFB	24 September 1979 (aged 21)	Youth system
27	Jorginho Paulista (on loan from Udinese Calcio)	(Brazil)	LFB	20 February 1980 (aged 20)	(Brazil) Atlético Paranaense (loaned from Udinese Calcio)
28	Alexandre Torres	(Brazil)	CB	22 August 1966 (aged 34)	(Japan) Nagoya Grampus Eight
29	Clébson	(Brazil)	RFB	4 September 1978 (aged 22)	(Brazil) Bahia
30	Gilberto	(Brazil)	LFB	25 April 1976 (aged 24)	(Italy) Internazionale Molano
	Válber	(Brazil)	CB, DM, RFB	31 May 1967 (aged 33)	(Brazil) Fluminense
Midfielders
5	Paulo Miranda	(Brazil)	DM, RFB, AM	25 January 1974 (aged 26)	(Brazil) Atlético Paranaense
6	Felipe	(Brazil)	AM, LFB, DM	2 September 1977 (aged 23)	Youth system
7	Pedrinho	(Brazil)	AM, CF	29 June 1977 (aged 23)	Youth system
10	Juninho Paulista (on loan from Atlético Madrid)	(Brazil)	AM	22 February 1973 (aged 27)	(England) Middlesbrough (loaned from Atlético Madrid)
17	Nasa	(Brazil)	DM	8 December 1968 (aged 32)	(Brazil) Madureira
20	Luisinho	(Brazil)	DM	17 March 1965 (aged 35)	(Brazil) Corinthians (loaned from Vasco da Gama)
21	Fabiano Eller	(Brazil)	DM, LFB, CB	19 November 1977 (aged 23)	Youth system
23	Alex Oliveira	(Brazil)	AM, DM, LFB	21 January 1974 (aged 26)	(Brazil) Atlético Paranaense
31	Juninho Pernambucano	(Brazil)	AM	30 January 1975 (aged 25)	(Brazil) Sport do Recife
32	Zada	(Brazil)	AM	21 May 1977 (aged 23)	Youth system
	Fabrício Carvalho	(Brazil)	DM	30 January 1978 (aged 22)	Youth system
	Siston (youth player)	(Brazil)	AM	25 January 1981 (aged 19)	Youth system
Forwards
8	Euller	(Brazil)	CF	15 March 1971 (aged 29)	(Brazil) Palmeiras
9	Viola	(Brazil)	CF	1 January 1969 (aged 32)	(Brazil) Santos
11	Romário	(Brazil)	CF	29 January 1966 (aged 34)	(Brazil) Flamengo
19	Zezinho	(Brazil)	CF, AM	13 September 1974 (aged 26)	(Brazil) Internacional (loaned from Vasco da Gama)
26	Luiz Cláudio	(Brazil)	CF	19 May 1978 (aged 22)	(Brazil) Bahia (loaned from Vasco da Gama)

== Pre-season and friendlies ==
22 December 1999	Vasco da Gama	v	Santa Cruz	Rio de Janeiro

29 December 1999	Vasco da Gama (Brazil)	v	(Morocco) Raja	Rio de Janeiro

3 January 2000	Vasco da Gama (Brazil)	v	Algeria	Rio de Janeiro

30 June 2000	Rio Branco (ES)	v	Vasco da Gama	Cariacica

22 July 2000	São Cristóvão	v	Vasco da Gama	Cariacica

== Competitions ==
Times from 1 January to 26 February 2000 and from 8 October to 31 December 2000 are UTC–2, from 27 February 2000 to 7 October 2000 UTC–3.

=== Campeonato Brasileiro Série A (Copa João Havelange) ===
==== League stage ====
===== League table =====
Pos	Team	Pld	W	D	L	GF	GA	GD	Pts
3	Fluminense (A)	24	12	6	6	45	31	+14	42
4	Goiás (A)	24	11	8	5	41	29	+12	41
5	Vasco da Gama (A)	24	11	6	7	36	37	−1	39
6	São Paulo (A)	24	10	9	5	46	35	+11	39
7	Ponte Preta (A)	24	11	5	8	49	37	+12	38

Updated to match(es) played on 4 June 2009. Source: RSSSF
Rules for classification: 1) points; 2) goal difference; 3) number of goals scored.
(A) Advance to a further round

===== Results summary =====
Overall								Home						Away					
Pld	W	D	L	GF	GA	GD	Pts	W	D	L	GF	GA	GD	W	D	L	GF	GA	GD
0	0	0	0	0	0	0	0	0	0	0	0	0	0	0	0	0	0	0	0

===== Matches =====
29 July 2000 I	Vasco da Gama	0 – 2	Sport do Recife	Rio de Janeiro
			51' Leonardo; 65' Taílson	Stadium: Estádio Vasco da Gama (São Januário)

6 August 2000 II	Vasco da Gama	3 – 3	Cruzeiro	Rio de Janeiro
	Viola 2', 34'; Romário 17'		37', 50' Geovanni; 47' Oséas	Stadium: Estádio Vasco da Gama (São Januário)

11 August 2000 III	Vasco da Gama	1 – 0	Corinthians	Rio de Janeiro
	Romário 63'			Stadium: Estádio Vasco da Gama (São Januário)

13 August 2000 IV	Guarani	0 – 1	Vasco da Gama	Campinas
			45+1' Viola	Stadium: Estádio Brinco de Ouro da Princesa

16 August 2000 V	Santa Cruz	1 – 1	Vasco da Gama	Recife
	Joelson 18'		53' Romário	Stadium: Estádio José do Rego Maciel (Mundão do Arruda)

20 August 2000 VI	Vasco da Gama	2 – 1	Ponte Preta	Rio de Janeiro
	Romário 57', 82'		51' Macedo	Stadium: Estádio Vasco da Gama (São Januário)

27 August 2000 VII	Portuguesa	2 – 2	Vasco da Gama	São Paulo
	Marquinhos 17'; Lúcio 47'		67', 90' Luiz Cláudio	Stadium: Estádio Oswaldo Teixeira Duarte (Canindé)

5 September 2000 VIII	Vasco da Gama	2 – 2	Atlético Paranaense	Rio de Janeiro
	Viola 7'; Romário 24'		77' Kléber Pereira; 90+3' Kléberson	Stadium: Estádio Vasco da Gama (São Januário)

10 September 2000 IX	Bahia	3 – 1	Vasco da Gama	Salvador, Bahia
	Jajá 52'; Filipe Alvim 57'; Capixaba 89'		39' Felipe	Stadium: Estádio Octávio Mangabeira (Fonte Nova)

13 September 2000 X	Vasco da Gama	4 – 3	Fluminense	Rio de Janeiro
	Romário 18', 72'; Juninho Pernambucano 29'; Juninho Paulista 74'		3' Magno Alves; 14', 60' Agnaldo	Stadium: Estádio Mário Filho (Maracanã)

20 September 2000 XI	Vasco da Gama	4 – 0	América (MG)	Rio de Janeiro
	Euller 34'; Romário 56', 59'; Juninho Pernambucano 71'			Stadium: Estádio Vasco da Gama (São Januário)

24 September 2000 XII	Juventude	1 – 2	Vasco da Gama	Caxias do Sul
	Paulo César 34'		31', 85' Romário	Stadium: Estádio Alfredo Jaconi

4 October 2000 XIII	Vasco da Gama	4 – 0	Atlético Mineiro	Rio de Janeiro
	Juninho Pernambucano 25', 73'; Nasa 43'; Pedrinho 89'			Stadium: Estádio Vasco da Gama (São Januário)

11 October 2000 XIV	Vasco da Gama	2 – 2	Vitória	Rio de Janeiro
	Romário 4'; Juninho Paulista 52'		57' Sinval; 90+2' Felipe	Stadium: Estádio Vasco da Gama (São Januário)

14 October 2000 XV	Santos	1 – 1	Vasco da Gama	Santos, São Paulo
	Robert 90+2'		42' Juninho Paulista	Stadium: Estádio Urbano Caldeira (Vila Belmiro)

21 October 2000 XVI	Vasco da Gama	1 – 0	Gama	Rio de Janeiro
	Romário 47'			Stadium: Estádio Vasco da Gama (São Januário)

24 October 2000 XVII	Vasco da Gama	2 – 1	Goiás	Rio de Janeiro
	Juninho Pernambucano 38'; Juninho Paulista 65'		26' Josué	Stadium: Estádio Vasco da Gama (São Januário)

27 October 2000 XVIII	Flamengo	4 – 0	Vasco da Gama	Rio de Janeiro
	Petković 29', 64'; Adriano 54'; Edílson 87'			Stadium: Estádio Mário Filho (Maracanã)

3 November 2000 XIX	Coritiba	0 – 1	Vasco da Gama	Curitiba
			78' Júnior Baiano	Stadium: Estádio Major Antônio Couto Pereira

5 November 2000 XX	Internacional	2 – 0	Vasco da Gama	Porto Alegre
	Rodrigão 14', 53'			Stadium: Estádio José Pinheiro Borda (Beira-Rio)

10 November 2000 XXI	Palmeiras	3 – 0	Vasco da Gama	São Paulo
	Tuta 17'; Basílio 19'; Juninho 36'			Stadium: Estádio Palestra Itália (Parque Antarctica)

12 November 2000 XXII	Botafogo	2 – 1	Vasco da Gama	Rio de Janeiro
	Zé Carlos 50'; Rodrigo 65'		74' Pedrinho	Stadium: Estádio Mário Filho (Maracanã)

16 November 2000 XXIII	Grêmio	0 – 1	Vasco da Gama	Porto Alegre
			70' Jorginho	Stadium: Estádio Olímpico Monumental

19 November 2000 XXIV	Vasco da Gama	0 – 4	São Paulo	Rio de Janeiro
			21', 31' Fábio Simplício; 65' (o.g.) Valkmar; 85' Beto	Stadium: Estádio Vasco da Gama (São Januário)

==== Championship knockout phase ====
25 November 2000 Round of 16: leg I	Bahia	3 – 3	Vasco da Gama	Salvador, Bahia
	Jorge Wagner 2'; Maurício 6'; Odvan 80'		13' Clébson; 24' Romário; 45+1' Juninho Paulista	Stadium: Estádio Octávio Mangabeira (Fonte Nova)

28 November 2000 Round of 16: leg II	Vasco da Gama	3 – 2 (6 – 5 agg.)	Bahia	Rio de Janeiro
	Euller 27', 50'; Juninho Paulista 75'		41' Vagner; 59' Fabrício Carvalho	Stadium: Estádio Vasco da Gama (São Januário)

3 December 2000 Quarterfinals: leg I	Vasco da Gama	3 – 1	Paraná	Rio de Janeiro
	Juninho Paulista 24'; Romário 51', 83'		59' Flávio Guilherme	Stadium: Estádio Vasco da Gama (São Januário)

9 December 2000 Quarterfinals: leg II	Paraná	1 – 0 (2 – 3 agg.)	Vasco da Gama	Curitiba
	Reinaldo 51'			Stadium: Estádio Major Antônio Couto Pereira

16 December 2000 Semifinals: leg I	Vasco da Gama	2 – 2	Cruzeiro	Rio de Janeiro
	Euller 41', 49'		81' Fábio Júnior; 89' Alex Mineiro	Stadium: Estádio Vasco da Gama (São Januário)

23 December 2000 Semifinals: leg II	Cruzeiro	1 – 3 (3 – 5 agg.)	Vasco da Gama	Belo Horizonte
	Sorín 43'		33' Juninho Pernambucano; 59' Euller; 90+4' Romário	Stadium: Estádio Governador Magalhães Pinto (Mineirão)

27 December 2000 Finals: leg I	São Caetano	1 – 1	Vasco da Gama	São Paulo
	César 12'		28' Romário	Stadium: Estádio Palestra Itália (Parque Antarctica)

30 December 2000 Finals: leg I	Vasco da Gama	postponed (Note: Interrupted at minute 27 and score 0–0 and after suspended due lack of security after a crush caused by the fall of a part of the fence which resulted 168 injuries.)	São Caetano	Rio de Janeiro
				Stadium: Estádio Vasco da Gama (São Januário)

18 January 2001 Finals: leg I	Vasco da Gama	3 – 1 (4 – 2 agg.)	São Caetano	Rio de Janeiro
	Juninho Pernambucano 31'; Jorginho Paulista 41'; Romário 54'		38' Adãozinho	Stadium: Estádio Mário Filho (Maracanã)

Brasileirão (Copa João Havelange)
champion – 2000

=== Copa do Brasil ===
15 March 2000 Second round	Botafogo (PB)	1 – 3	Vasco da Gama	João Pessoa, Paraíba
	Tiago 23'		74' Edmundo; 85' Dedé; 90' Paulo Miranda	Stadium: Estádio José Américo de Almeida Filho (Almeidão)

27 April 2000 Third round: leg I	Vasco da Gama	1 – 1	Ponte Preta	Rio de Janeiro
	Romário 67'		38' Luís Fabiano	Stadium: Estádio Vasco da Gama (São Januário)

3 May 2000 Third round: leg II	Ponte Preta	0 – 1 (1 – 2 agg.)	Vasco da Gama	Campinas
			68' Gilberto	Stadium: Estádio Moisés Lucarelli (Majestoso)

24 May 2000 Round of 16: leg I	Fluminense	1 – 1	Vasco da Gama	Rio de Janeiro
	Régis 25'		29' Pedrinho	Stadium: Estádio Mário Filho (Maracanã)

31 May 2000 Round of 16: leg II	Vasco da Gama	2 – 2 (3 – 3 (a) agg.)	Fluminense	Rio de Janeiro
	Edmundo 62', 77'		2' Magno Alves; 48' Agnaldo	Stadium: Estádio Vasco da Gama (São Januário)

=== FIFA Club World Championship ===
==== FIFA Club World Championship squad ====
Note: Flags indicate national team as defined under FIFA eligibility rules; some limited exceptions apply. Players may hold more than one non-FIFA nationality.

No.	Pos.	Nation	Player
1	GK	BRA	Carlos Germano
2	DF	BRA	Jorginho
3	DF	BRA	Odvan
4	DF	BRA	Mauro Galvão
5	MF	BRA	Amaral
6	MF	BRA	Felipe
7	FW	BRA	Donizete
8	MF	BRA	Juninho Pernambucano
9	MF	BRA	Ramon
10	FW	BRA	Edmundo
11	FW	BRA	Romário
12	GK	BRA	Helton

No.	Pos.	Nation	Player
13	DF	BRA	Gilberto
14	DF	BRA	Alexandre Torres
15	MF	BRA	Paulo Miranda
16	MF	BRA	Pedrinho
17	DF	BRA	Júnior Baiano
18	DF	BRA	Válber
19	FW	BRA	Viola
20	GK	BRA	Márcio
21	MF	BRA	Nasa
22	DF	BRA	Valkmar
23	MF	BRA	Alex Oliveira

==== Group stage ====
Pos	Team	Pld	W	D	L	GF	GA	GD	Pts	Qualification
1	(Brazil) Vasco da Gama	3	3	0	0	7	2	+5	9	Advance to final
2	(Mexico) Necaxa	3	1	1	1	5	4	+1	4	Advance to match for third place
3	(England) Manchester United	3	1	1	1	4	4	0	4	
4	(Australia) South Melbourne	3	0	0	3	1	7	−6	0	

Source: FIFA

6 January 2000 I	Vasco da Gama (Brazil)	2 – 0	(Australia) South Melbourne	Rio de Janeiro, Brazil
20:45	Felipe 53'; Edmundo 86'	Report		Stadium: Estádio Mário Filho (Maracanã); Attendance: 66,000

8 January 2000 I	Manchester United (England)	1 – 3	(Brazil) Vasco da Gama	Rio de Janeiro, Brazil
18:15	Butt 81'	Report	24', 26' Romário; 43' Edmundo	Stadium: Estádio Mário Filho (Maracanã); Attendance: 73,000

11 January 2000 III	Necaxa (Mexico)	1 – 2	(Brazil) Vasco da Gama	Rio de Janeiro, Brazil
20:45	Aguinaga 5'	Report	14' Odvan; 69' Romário	Stadium: Estádio Mário Filho (Maracanã); Attendance: 45,000

==== Final ====
14 January 2000 Final	Vasco da Gama (Brazil)	0 – 0 (3 – 4 p)	(Brazil) Corinthians	Rio de Janeiro, Brazil
20:00		Report		Stadium: Estádio Mário Filho (Maracanã); Attendance: 73,000
	Penalties
	Romário (penalty scored); Alex Oliveira (penalty scored); Gilberto (penalty missed); Viola (penalty scored); Edmundo (penalty missed)		(penalty scored) Rincón; (penalty scored) Fernando Baiano; (penalty scored) Luizão; (penalty scored) Edu; (penalty missed) Marcelinho Carioca

=== Campeonato Carioca ===
==== Taça Guanabara ====
Pos	Team	Pld	W	D	L	GF	GA	GD	Pts	Qualification
1	Vasco da Gama	11	10	1	0	35	5	+30	31	Taça Guanabara champions, advanced to final
2	Botafogo	11	8	2	1	26	10	+16	26	
3	Flamengo	11	7	2	2	31	12	+19	23	
4	Americano	11	4	4	3	19	23	−4	16	
5	Fluminense	11	3	4	4	13	12	+1	13	
6	Madureira	11	3	4	4	14	18	−4	13	
7	Olaria	11	4	1	6	15	23	−8	13	
8	América	11	2	4	5	11	18	−7	10	
9	Bangu	11	3	2	6	11	19	−8	11	
10	Friburguense	11	2	5	4	10	18	−8	11	
11	Volta Redonda	11	1	3	7	9	19	−10	6	Eliminated
12	Cabo Frio	11	0	5	6	4	21	−17	5	Eliminated

Updated to match(es) played on April 23, 2000. Source: RSSSF.com
Rules for classification: 1) points; 2) wins; 3) goal difference; 4) number of goals scored.

12 March 2000 I	Vasco da Gama	2 – 0	Madureira	Rio de Janeiro
	Edmundo 62', 84'			Stadium: Estádio Vasco da Gama (São Januário)

18 March 2000 II	Vasco da Gama	3 – 0	Bangu	Rio de Janeiro
	Edmundo 31'; Alex Oliveira 64'; Pedrinho 82'			Stadium: Estádio Vasco da Gama (São Januário)

22 March 2000 III	Friburguense	0 – 1	Vasco da Gama	Nova Friburgo
			90+1' Edmundo	Stadium: Estádio Eduardo Guinle

25 March 2000 IV	Vasco da Gama	6 – 0	Americano	Rio de Janeiro
	Romário 7', 44', 48', 84'; Edmundo 55'; Paulo Miranda 89'			Stadium: Estádio Vasco da Gama (São Januário)

29 March 2000 V	Olaria	1 – 4	Vasco da Gama	Rio de Janeiro
	Luiz Claudio 11'		29', 41', 50' Romário; 66' Edmundo	Stadium: Estádio Mourão Vieira Filho (Rua Bariri)

2 April 2000 VI	Vasco da Gama	3 – 2	Fluminense	Rio de Janeiro
	Luciano 22' (o.g.); Romário 33'; Edmundo 42'		79' Régis; 85' Roger	Stadium: Estádio Mário Filho (Maracanã)

9 April 2000 VII	Botafogo	0 – 0	Vasco da Gama	Rio de Janeiro
				Stadium: Estádio Mário Filho (Maracanã)

12 April 2000 VIII	Volta Redonda	0 – 3	Vasco da Gama	Volta Redonda
			11' Júnior Baiano; 45' Paulo Miranda; 90' Odvan	Stadium: Estádio Municipal General Sylvio Raulino de Oliveira (da Cidadania)

15 April 2000 IX	America	1 – 3	Vasco da Gama	Rio de Janeiro
	Cadu 83'		27', 71' Romário; 55' Pedrinho	Stadium: Estádio Mário Filho (Maracanã)

19 April 2000 X	Vasco da Gama	5 – 0	Cabo Frio	Rio de Janeiro
	Romário 14', 80'; Odvan 23'; Viola 45'; Paulo Miranda 63'			Stadium: Estádio Vasco da Gama (São Januário)

23 April 2000 XI	Flamengo	1 – 5	Vasco da Gama	Rio de Janeiro
	Leandro Machado 7'		15' Felipe; 26', 51', 57' Romário; 69' Pedrinho	Stadium: Estádio Mário Filho (Maracanã)

==== Taça Rio de Janeiro ====
Pos	Team	Pld	W	D	L	GF	GA	GD	Pts	Qualification
1	Flamengo	9	7	1	1	25	12	+13	22	Taça Rio champions, advanced to final
2	Vasco da Gama	9	5	2	2	21	10	+11	17	
3	Botafogo	9	5	2	2	17	10	+7	17	
4	Fluminense	9	5	1	3	17	16	+1	16	
5	Bangu	9	2	4	3	13	16	−3	10	
6	Americano	9	3	1	5	10	13	−3	10	
7	Olaria	9	3	1	5	12	18	−6	10	
8	Friburguense	9	2	3	4	9	13	−4	9	
9	América	9	2	3	4	12	17	−5	9	
10	Madureira	9	1	2	6	5	16	−11	5	

Updated to match(es) played on June 7, 2000. Source: RSSSF.com
Rules for classification: 1) points; 2) wins; 3) goal difference; 4) number of goals scored.

30 April 2000 I	Madureira	1 – 3	Vasco da Gama	Rio de Janeiro
	André Ladaga 57'		20' Viola; 28', 69' Pedrinho	Stadium: Estádio Conselheiro Galvão

17 May 2000 II	Bangu	1 – 4	Vasco da Gama	Rio de Janeiro
	Renatinho 65'		13' Romário; 72' Dedé; 78', 86' Viola	Stadium: Estádio Proletário Guilherme da Silveira Filho (Moça Bonita)

4 June 2000 III	Vasco da Gama	1 – 0	Friburguense	Rio de Janeiro
	Juninho Pernambucano 22'			Stadium: Estádio Vasco da Gama (São Januário)

10 May 2000 IV	Americano	0 – 2	Vasco da Gama	Campos dos Goytacazes
			29' Romário; 68' Pedrinho	Stadium: Estádio Godofredo Cruz

13 May 2000 V	Vasco da Gama	6 – 1	Olaria	Rio de Janeiro
	Gilberto 32'; Amaral 38'; Romário 48', 67'; Viola 61'; Luiz Claudio 77' (o.g.)		59' Robson	Stadium: Estádio Vasco da Gama (São Januário)

21 May 2000 VI	Fluminense	1 – 0	Vasco da Gama	Rio de Janeiro
	Roger 14'			Stadium: Estádio Mário Filho (Maracanã)

7 June 2000 VII	Vasco da Gama	1 – 1	Botafogo	Rio de Janeiro
	Edmundo 30'		49' Donizete	Stadium: Estádio Mário Filho (Maracanã)

6 May 2000 VIII	Vasco da Gama	1 – 2	America	Rio de Janeiro
	Viola 42'		8' João Pedro; 68' Celso	Stadium: Estádio Vasco da Gama (São Januário)

28 May 2000 IX	Vasco da Gama	3 – 3	Flamengo	Rio de Janeiro
	Edmundo 21'; Juninho Pernambucano 28'; Viola 85'		6' Juan; 20' Petković; 46' Reinaldo	Stadium: Estádio Mário Filho (Maracanã)

==== Championship phase ====
11 June 2000 Finals: leg I	Flamengo	3 – 0	Vasco da Gama	Rio de Janeiro
	Athirson 75'; Fábio Baiano 87'; Beto 90+1'			Stadium: Estádio Mário Filho (Maracanã)

17 June 2000 Finals: leg II	Vasco da Gama	1 – 2 (1 – 5 agg.)	Flamengo	Rio de Janeiro
	Viola 42'		50' Reinaldo; 57' Tuta	Stadium: Estádio Mário Filho (Maracanã)

=== Copa Mercosur ===
==== Group stage ====
Group E

1 August 2000 I	Peñarol (Uruguay)	v	(Brazil) Vasco da Gama	Montevideo, Uruguay

24 August 2000 II	Vasco da Gama (Brazil)	v	(Argentina) San Lorenzo de Almagro	Rio de Janeiro, Brazil

31 August 2000 III	Atlético Mineiro (Brazil)	v	(Brazil) Vasco da Gama	Belo Horizonte, Brazil

7 September 2000 IV	Vasco da Gama (Brazil)	v	(Uruguay) Peñarol	Rio de Janeiro, Brazil

28 September 2000 V	San Lorenzo de Almagro (Argentina)	v	(Brazil) Vasco da Gama	Buenos Aires, Argentina

17 October 2000 VI	Vasco da Gama (Brazil)	v	(Brazil) Atlético Mineiro	Rio de Janeiro, Brazil

==== Knockout phase ====
31 October 2000 Quarterfinals: leg I	Vasco da Gama (Brazil)	v	(Argentina) Rosario Central	Rio de Janeiro, Brazil

8 November 2000 Quarterfinals: leg II	Rosario Central (Argentina)	v	(Brazil) Vasco da Gama	Rosario, Santa Fe, Argentina

22 November 2000 Semifinals: leg I	River Plate (Argentina)	v	(Brazil) Vasco da Gama	Buenos Aires, Argentina

31 October 2000 Semifinals: leg II	Vasco da Gama (Brazil)	v	(Argentina) River Plate	Rio de Janeiro, Brazil

6 December 2000 Finals: leg I	Vasco da Gama (Brazil)	v	(Brazil) Palmeiras	Rio de Janeiro, Brazil

12 December 2000 Finals: leg II	Palmeiras (Brazil)	v	(Brazil) Vasco da Gama	São Paulo, Brazil

20 December 2000 Finals: leg III	Palmeiras (Brazil)	v	(Brazil) Vasco da Gama	São Paulo, Brazil

Copa Mercosur
champion – 2000

=== Torneio Rio–São Paulo ===
==== Group stage ====
Group B

23 January 2000 I	Vasco da Gama	v	Palmeiras	Rio de Janeiro

27 January 2000 II	Fluminense	v	Vasco da Gama	Rio de Janeiro

30 January 2000 III	Vasco da Gama	v	Corinthians	Rio de Janeiro

5 February 2000 IV	Palmeiras	v	Vasco da Gama	São Paulo

9 February 2000 V	Vasco da Gama	v	Fluminense	Rio de Janeiro

13 February 2000 VI	Vasco da Gama	v	Santos	São Paulo

==== Knockout phase ====
19 February 2000 Semifinals: leg I	São Paulo	v	Vasco da Gama	São Paulo

23 February 2000 Semifinals: leg II	Vasco da Gama	v	São Paulo	Rio de Janeiro

26 February 2000 Finals: leg I	Vasco da Gama	v	Palmeiras	Rio de Janeiro

1 March 2000 Finals: leg II	Palmeiras	v	Vasco da Gama	São Paulo

== Statistics ==
=== Squad appearances and goals ===
Last updated on 18 January 2001.

No.	Pos	Nat	Player	Total		Brasileirão Série A league stage		Brasileirão knockout phase		Copa do Brasil		Club World Championship		Campeonato do Estado do Rio de Janeiro		Other (Note: Includes appearances in Torneio Rio de Janeiro – São Paulo, Copa Mercosur and friendlies.)	
No.	Pos	Nat	Player	Apps	Goals	Apps	Goals	Apps	Goals	Apps	Goals	Apps	Goals	Apps	Goals	Apps	Goals
Goalkeepers
1	GK	(Brazil) BRA	Helton	54	0	15	0	8	0	5	0	4	0	22	0	0	0
12	GK	(Brazil) BRA	Márcio	8	0	8	0	0	0	0	0	0	0	0	0	0	0
24	GK	(Brazil) BRA	Fábio	3	0	1+2	0	0	0	0	0	0	0	0	0	0	0
Defenders
2	DF	(Brazil) BRA	Jorginho	44	1	18+3	1	7	0	1+1	0	2	0	5+7	0	0	0
3	DF	(Brazil) BRA	Odvan	55	3	16+1	0	8	0	5	0	1+2	1	22	2	0	0
4	DF	(Brazil) BRA	Júnior Baiano	30	2	13+2	1	6	0	1	0	3	0	3+2	1	0	0
13	DF	(Brazil) BRA	André Silva	7	0	3+4	0	0	0	0	0	0	0	0	0	0	0
14	DF	(Brazil) BRA	Valkmar	11	0	8+3	0	0	0	0	0	0	0	0	0	0	0
15	DF	(Brazil) BRA	Henrique	12	0	5	0	0+4	0	0+1	0	0	0	1+1	0	0	0
16	DF	(Brazil) BRA	Géder	7	0	5+2	0	0	0	0	0	0	0	0	0	0	0
22	DF	(Brazil) BRA	Mauro Galvão	28	0	1+2	0	2+1	0	2	0	4	0	16	0	0	0
25	DF	(Brazil) BRA	Maricá	12	0	2+3	0	0	0	0+2	0	0	0	1+4	0	0	0
27	DF	(Brazil) BRA	Jorginho Paulista	15	1	5+2	0	8	1	0	0	0	0	0	0	0	0
28	DF	(Brazil) BRA	Alexandre Torres	9	0	4	0	0	0	2	0	0	0	2+1	0	0	0
29	DF	(Brazil) BRA	Clébson	29	1	20+1	0	8	1	0	0	0	0	0	0	0	0
30	DF	(Brazil) BRA	Gilberto	24	2	0	0	0	0	4	1	4	0	13+3	1	0	0
	DF	(Brazil) BRA	Válber	2	0	0	0	0	0	0	0	0	0	0+2	0	0	0
	DF	(Brazil) BRA	Filipe Alvim	4	0	0	0	0	0	0+1	0	0	0	3	0	0	0
Midfielders
5	MF	(Brazil) BRA	Paulo Miranda	55	4	16+2	0	6+2	0	5	1	2+1	0	20+1	3	0	0
6	MF	(Brazil) BRA	Felipe	38	3	9+1	1	0	0	5	0	4	1	18+1	1	0	0
7	MF	(Brazil) BRA	Pedrinho	44	9	5+7	2	1+6	0	3	1	0	0	17+5	6	0	0
10	MF	(Brazil) BRA	Juninho Paulista	31	6	23	4	8	2	0	0	0	0	0	0	0	0
17	MF	(Brazil) BRA	Nasa	46	1	16	1	4+4	0	4	0	0+1	0	17	0	0	0
20	MF	(Brazil) BRA	Luisinho	10	0	1+8	0	0+1	0	0	0	0	0	0	0	0	0
21	MF	(Brazil) BRA	Fabiano Eller	10	0	1+1	0	0	0	0+1	0	0	0	5+2	0	0	0
23	MF	(Brazil) BRA	Alex Oliveira	36	1	6+4	0	0+1	0	2+2	0	0+3	0	6+12	1	0	0
31	MF	(Brazil) BRA	Juninho Pernambucano	39	10	19+2	5	6	3	1	0	4	0	6+1	2	0	0
32	MF	(Brazil) BRA	Zada	2	0	1+1	0	0	0	0	0	0	0	0	0	0	0
	MF	(Brazil) BRA	Dias	1	0	0+1	0	0	0	0	0	0	0	0	0	0	0
	MF	(Brazil) BRA	Hélder	1	0	0	0	0	0	0+1	0	0	0	0	0	0	0
	MF	(Brazil) BRA	Amaral	31	1	0	0	0	0	5	0	4	0	22	1	0	0
	MF	(Brazil) BRA	Ramon	4	0	0	0	0	0	0	0	4	0	0	0	0	0
Forwards
8	FW	(Brazil) BRA	Euller	16	6	6+2	1	8	5	0	0	0	0	0	0	0	0
9	FW	(Brazil) BRA	Viola	43	12	16+2	4	0+1	0	5	0	0+2	0	14+3	8	0	0
11	FW	(Brazil) BRA	Romário	51	43	20	14	8	6	2	1	4	3	17	19	0	0
19	FW	(Brazil) BRA	Zezinho	6	0	1+4	0	0+1	0	0	0	0	0	0	0	0	0
26	FW	(Brazil) BRA	Luiz Cláudio	6	2	0+6	2	0	0	0	0	0	0	0	0	0	0
	FW	(Brazil) BRA	Rogério	6	0	0	0	0	0	0+1	0	0	0	2+3	0	0	0
	FW	(Brazil) BRA	Dedé	10	2	0	0	0	0	0+4	1	0	0	0+6	1	0	0
	FW	(Brazil) BRA	Donizete	2	0	0	0	0	0	0	0	1+1	0	0	0	0	0
	FW	(Brazil) BRA	Edmundo	17	14	0	0	0	0	3	3	3+1	2	10	9	0	0

== See also ==
- 2000 Club World Championship
- 2000 Torneio Rio de Janeiro – São Paulo
- 2000 Campeonato do Estado do Rio de Janeiro
- 2000 Copa do Brasil
- 2000 Brasileirão
- 2000 Copa Mercosur
