= 1998 Copa Interamericana =

- Event: Copa Interamericana
D.C. United	Vasco da Gama
(United States)	(Brazil)
2	1
- on aggregate

First leg
D.C. United	Vasco da Gama
0	1
- Date: November 14, 1998
- Venue: RFK Stadium, Washington, D.C.
- Referee: Carlos Batres (Guatemala)
- Attendance: 25,000

Second leg
Vasco da Gama	D.C. United
0	2
- Date: December 5, 1998
- Venue: Lockhart Stadium, Fort Lauderdale
- Referee: Carlos Batres (Guatemala)
- Attendance: 7,283

The 1998 Copa Interamericana was the 18th and last staging of the Copa Interamericana. The final took place between D.C. United and Vasco da Gama and was staged over two legs on 14 November 1998 and 5 December 1998. Both matches were played in the United States—the first in Washington, D.C., was won 1–0 by Vasco da Gama; the second leg in Fort Lauderdale was won 2–0 by D.C. United.

D.C. United won their first Copa Interamericana, winning the series 2–1 on aggregate. They are the only team from the United States to win the competition. D.C. United head coach Bruce Arena left the team after the match to manage the United States men's national soccer team.

== Qualified teams ==
Team	Qualification	Previous app.
(Brazil) Vasco da Gama	1998 Copa Libertadores champion	None
(United States) D.C. United	1998 CONCACAF Champions' Cup champion	None

== Venues ==
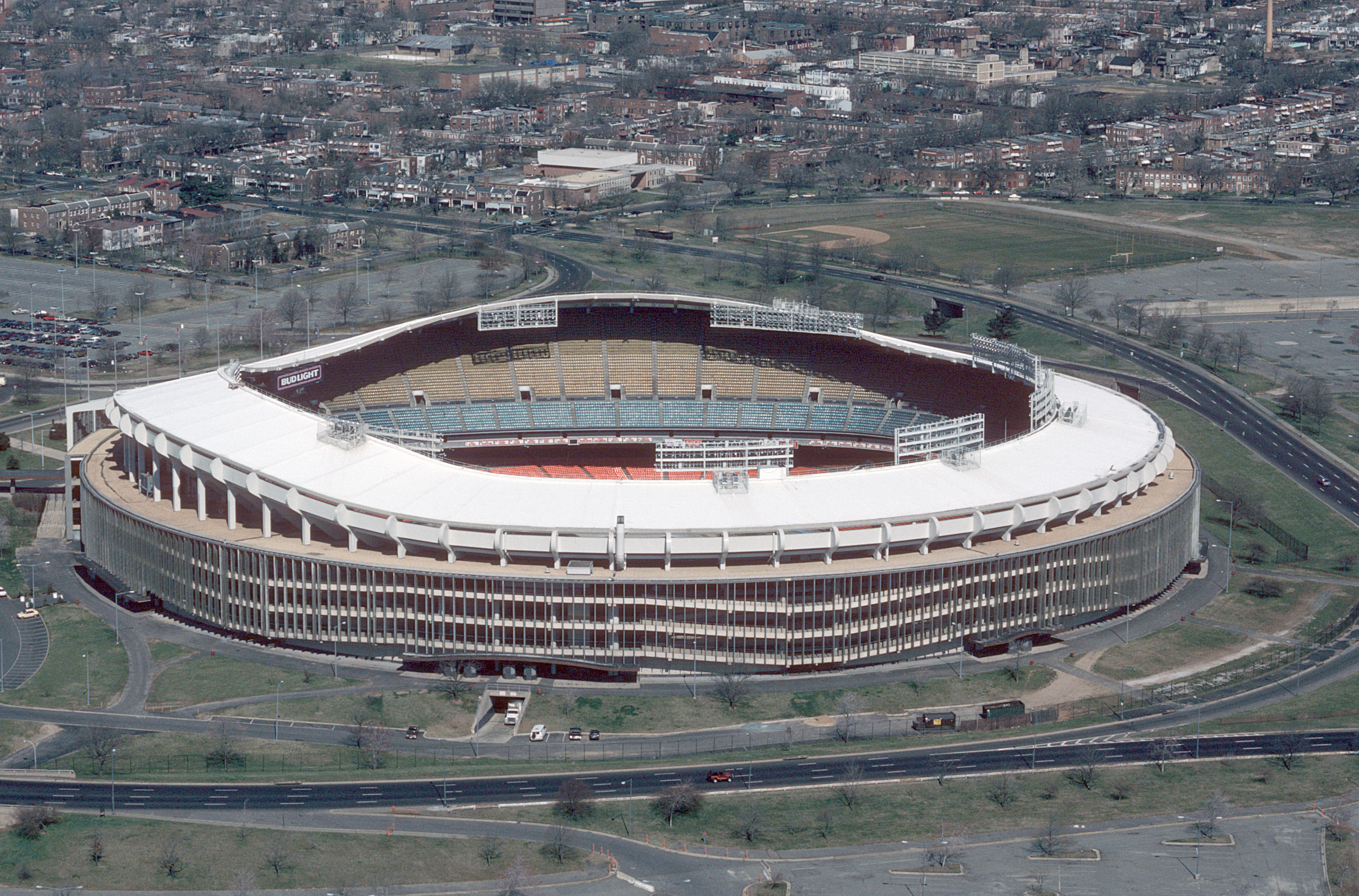
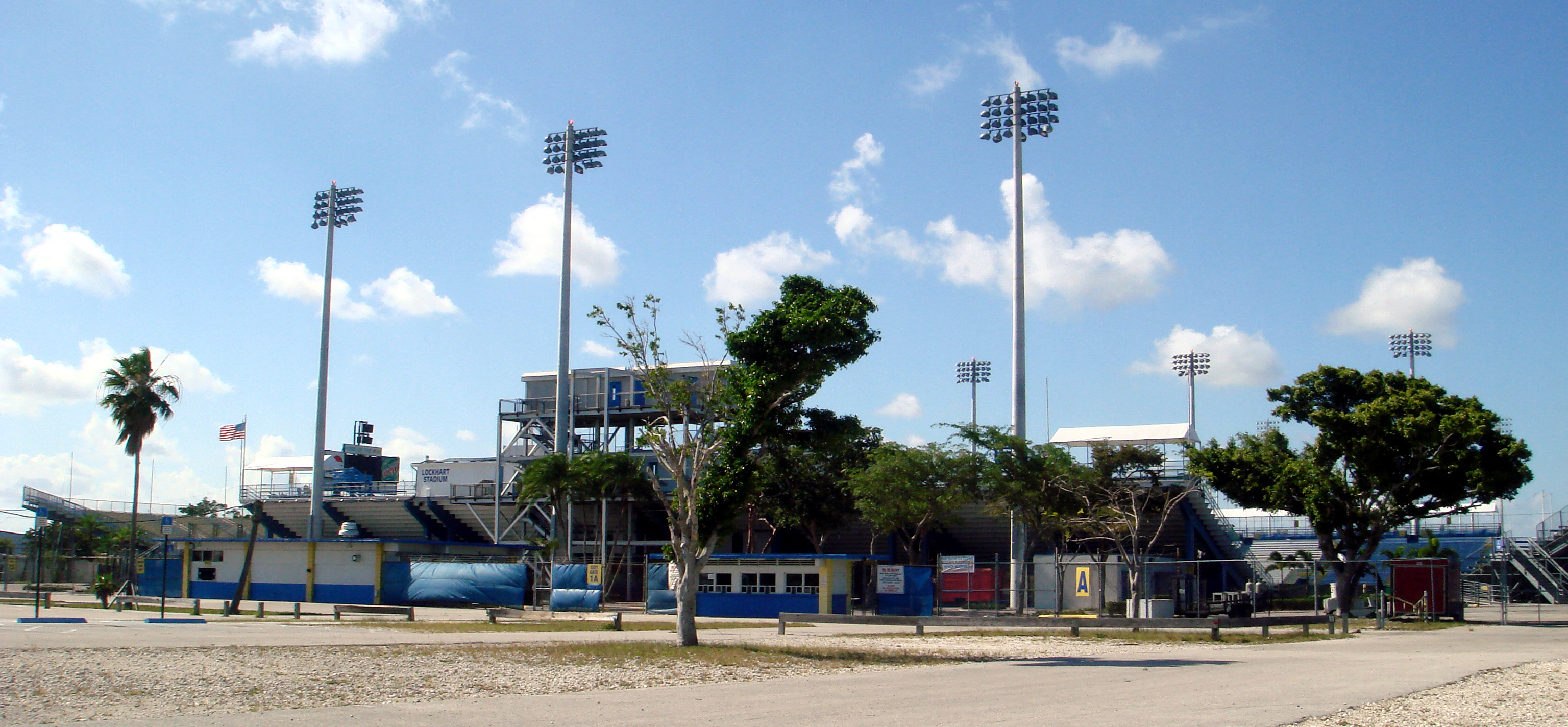
Robert F. Kennedy Memorial (left) and Lockhart Stadium, venues of the series

== Match details ==
=== First leg ===
1998 Copa Interamericana
14 November 1998
First leg

D.C. United (United States)	0–1	(Brazil) Vasco da Gama
		Felipe 69'

RFK Stadium, Washington, D.C.
Attendance: 26.216
Referee: Carlos Batres (Guatemala)

D.C. United	Vasco da Gama

GK		(United States) Tom Presthus
DF	20	(United States) Tony Sanneh		(substituted off) 81'
DF	23	(United States) Eddie Pope	(yellow card) 17'
DF	18	(United States) Carlos Llamosa
DF	12	(United States) Jeff Agoos
MF	14	(United States) Ben Olsen
MF	6	(United States) John Harkes
MF	16	(United States) Richie Williams
MF	10	(Bolivia) Marco Etcheverry
FW	9	(Bolivia) Jaime Moreno
FW	15	(United States) Roy Lassiter
Substitutes:
FW		(United States) A. J. Wood		(substituted on) 81'
Manager:
(United States) Bruce Arena

GK	1	(Brazil) Carlos Germano
DF		(Brazil) Filipe Alvim
DF	3	(Brazil) Odvan
DF		(Brazil) Henrique
DF		(Brazil) Felipe
MF	5	(Brazil) Luisinho	(substituted off) 80'
MF	10	(Brazil) Nasa
MF		(Brazil) Gian	(substituted off) 66'
FW	7	(Brazil) Donizete
FW		(Brazil) Guilherme
FW	9	(Brazil) Luizão	(substituted off) 46'
Substitutes:
DF		(Brazil) Válber	(substituted on) 46'
MF		(Brazil) Zada	(substituted on) 66'
MF		(Brazil) Nélson	(substituted on) 80'
Manager:
(Brazil) Antônio Lopes

=== Second leg ===
5 December 1998
Second leg

Vasco da Gama (Brazil)	0–2	(United States) D.C. United
		Sanneh 34'; Pope 77'

Lockhart Stadium, Fort Lauderdale
Attendance: 7,283
Referee: Carlos Batres (Guatemala)

Vasco da Gama	D.C. United

GK	1	(Brazil) Carlos Germano
DF	11	(Brazil) Vágner
DF	3	(Brazil) Odvan
DF	4	(Brazil) Mauro Galvão
DF	2	(Brazil) Flavinho		(substituted off) 80'
MF	8	(Brazil) Juninho Pernambucano		(substituted off) 46'
MF	5	(Brazil) Luisinho
MF	10	(Brazil) Nasa	(yellow card) 70'
MF	6	(Brazil) Felipe
FW	7	(Brazil) Donizete
FW	9	(Brazil) Luizão	(yellow card) 7'	(substituted off) 46'
Substitutes:
FW		(Brazil) Guilherme		(substituted on) 46'
DF		(Brazil) Vítor		(substituted on) 46'
FW		(Brazil) Mauricinho		(substituted on) 80'
Manager:
(Brazil) Antônio Lopes

GK	1	(United States) Scott Garlick
DF	20	(United States) Tony Sanneh
DF	23	(United States) Eddie Pope
DF	18	(United States) Carlos Llamosa
DF	12	(United States) Jeff Agoos
MF	14	(United States) Ben Olsen	(yellow card) 59'
MF	6	(United States) John Harkes
MF	16	(United States) Richie Williams	(yellow card) 63'
MF	10	(Bolivia) Marco Etcheverry
FW	9	(Bolivia) Jaime Moreno	(yellow card) 15'
FW	15	(United States) Roy Lassiter		(substituted off) 88'
Substitutes:
MF		(Canada) Geoff Aunger		(substituted on) 88'
Manager:
(United States) Bruce Arena
