= Copa João Havelange Final =

2000 final football match in Brazil

Copa João Havelange Finals
- Event: Copa João Havelange
São Caetano	Vasco da Gama
(São Paulo (state))	(Rio de Janeiro (state))
2	4

First leg
São Caetano	Vasco da Gama
1	1
- Date: 27 December 2000
- Venue: Estádio Palestra Itália, São Paulo
- Referee: Carlos Eugênio Simon (RS)
- Attendance: 29,288

Second leg
Vasco da Gama	São Caetano
3	1
- Date: 18 January 2001
- Venue: Maracanã Stadium, Rio de Janeiro
- Referee: Márcio Rezende de Freitas (RJ)
- Attendance: 31,761

The Copa João Havelange finals was the final two-legged match that determined the winner of the Copa João Havelange, the 45th season of the Campeonato Brasileiro Série A. Vasco da Gama from the Blue group defeated São Caetano from the Yellow group 4–2 (aggregate score), winning the championship for the fourth time. Notably, the games' second leg was abandoned and rescheduled following a crowd crush at São Januário.

São Caetano's appearance in the final was a surprise, as was the performance of their striker Adhemar who had scored 22 goals. On the other hand, Vasco da Gama had a squad of the past and present Brazilian national team (some of whom were world champions), but had recently changed coach – Joel Santana was hired after the previous manager had a disagreement with Vice President Eurico Miranda. Santana had only been in charge of the team for a few weeks, but had the merit of beating Cruzeiro in Belo Horizonte.

== Second leg incident ==
Ambulances attend the wounded who have spilled onto the pitch at São Januário.

The return leg at São Januário on 30 December 2000 was marked by an crowd crush in which over 150 people were injured. Twenty-three minutes into the match, Vasco da Gama striker Romário was substituted because of an injury. According to reports, a fight then broke out between rival supporters in the upper terraces, triggering a crush downwards as people attempted to flee. Fans lower down were pushed onto the lower perimeter fence, which collapsed under the weight and spilled people onto the pitch.

The game was suspended for two hours as ambulance staff treated the injured on the pitch, with helicopters taking the most seriously hurt to hospital. When all the injured had been treated, police and club officials attempted to restart the game. However, Rio de Janeiro governor Anthony Garotinho ordered the match to be suspended to "prevent a greater tragedy". This prompted a furious outburst from Vasco da Gama president Eurico Miranda, who remarked:

The military police chiefs were prepared to encircle the pitch so none of the fans could interrupt the match restarting [...] However, the governor, who is a weak-willed incompetent man, decided to have the match abandoned.

In moves that later faced criticism, Vasco players then seized the trophy and performed a victory lap around the stadium, with the club later declaring themselves champions. The game was later rescheduled for 18 January 2001.

After the accident, the Vasco club president Miranda received significant blame. Governor Garotinho said that the government had offered the 130,000 capacity Maracanã Stadium for the game, but Vasco rejected it in favour of their own São Januário, which had only 35,000 seats. This decision had already been widely criticised before the game. Vasco officials said approximately 33,000 tickets were sold, but many fans arrived with children who entered without tickets. Rio Secretary for Public Security Josias Quintal said Miranda should be sued "because Eurico sold too many tickets" and "he is the person most responsible". State police ordered the stadium to be closed indefinitely the day after the game after finding the collapsed fence had been weakened by rust and suggested there were "signs of negligence". A later inspection by the Institute of Criminology Carlos Eboli (ICCE) reiterated these findings.

== Match details ==
=== First leg ===
27 December 2000
21:40 GMT-2

São Caetano	1–1	Vasco da Gama
César 14'		Romário 27'

Palestra Itália, São Paulo
Attendance: 29,288
Referee: Carlos Eugênio Simon

=== Second leg (abandoned) ===
30 December 2000
16:00 GMT-2

Vasco da Gama	(Match suspended at 27')	São Caetano

São Januário, Rio de Janeiro
Attendance: 32,537
Referee: Oscar Roberto Godói

=== Second leg (rematch) ===
18 January 2001
16:00 GMT-2

Vasco da Gama	3–1	São Caetano
Juninho Pernambucano 30' Jorginho Paulista 39' Romário 53'		Adãozinho 37'

Maracanã, Rio de Janeiro
Attendance: 31,761
Referee: Márcio Rezende de Freitas
