= 2000 FIFA Club World Championship final =

- Event: 2000 FIFA Club World Championship
| Corinthians | Vasco da Gama |
| (Brazil) | (Brazil) |
| 0 | 0 |
- After extra time Corinthians won 4–3 on penalties
- Date: 14 January 2000
- Venue: Estádio do Maracanã; Rio de Janeiro, Brazil
- Referee: Dick Jol (Netherlands)
- Attendance: 73,000

The 2000 FIFA Club World Championship final was an association football match that took place at Estádio do Maracanã, Rio de Janeiro on 14 January 2000. It was an all-Brazilian final between Corinthians and Vasco da Gama to determine the winner of the 2000 FIFA Club World Championship. After a goalless 120 minutes, Corinthians won the penalty shoot-out 4–3, becoming the first club to lift the FIFA Club World Cup.

== Match details ==
14 January 2000
20:00

| Corinthians (Brazil) | 0–0 (a.e.t.) | (Brazil) Vasco da Gama |
|---|---|---|
| | Report |
Penalties
| Rincón (penalty scored); Fernando Baiano (penalty scored); Luizão (penalty scored); Edu (penalty scored); Marcelinho (penalty missed) | 4–3 | (penalty scored) Romário; (penalty scored) Alex Oliveira; (penalty missed) Gilberto; (penalty scored) Viola; (penalty missed) Edmundo |

Maracanã Stadium, Rio de Janeiro
Attendance: 73,000
Referee: Dick Jol (Netherlands)

| Corinthians | Vasco da Gama |

| GK | 1 | (Brazil) Dida |
| RB | 2 | (Brazil) Índio | (yellow card) 97' |
| CB | 3 | (Brazil) Adilson Batista | (yellow card) 75' |
| CB | 16 | (Brazil) Fábio Luciano |
| LB | 6 | (Brazil) Kléber |
| CM | 5 | (Brazil) Vampeta | | (substituted off) 91' |
| CM | 8 | (Colombia) Freddy Rincón (c) | (yellow card) 43' |
| RM | 7 | (Brazil) Marcelinho |
| LM | 11 | (Brazil) Ricardinho | | (substituted off) 46' |
| SS | 10 | (Brazil) Edílson | | (substituted off) 113' |
| CF | 9 | (Brazil) Luizão | (yellow card) 113' |
Substitutions:
| MF | 20 | (Brazil) Edu | | (substituted on) 46' |
| MF | 23 | (Brazil) Gilmar Fubá | | (substituted on) 91' |
| FW | 17 | (Brazil) Fernando Baiano | | (substituted on) 113' |
Manager:
(Brazil) Oswaldo de Oliveira

| GK | 12 | (Brazil) Helton |
| RB | 15 | (Brazil) Paulo Miranda | (yellow card) 54' |
| CB | 3 | (Brazil) Odvan |
| CB | 4 | (Brazil) Mauro Galvão |
| LB | 13 | (Brazil) Gilberto |
| DM | 5 | (Brazil) Amaral | (yellow card) 33' |
| RM | 8 | (Brazil) Juninho Pernambucano | | (substituted off) 96' |
| LM | 6 | (Brazil) Felipe | | (substituted off) 102' |
| AM | 9 | (Brazil) Ramon Menezes | (yellow card) 16' | (substituted off) 111' |
| CF | 10 | (Brazil) Edmundo (c) | (yellow card) 98' |
| CF | 11 | (Brazil) Romário |
Substitutions:
| FW | 19 | (Brazil) Viola | | (substituted on) 96' |
| MF | 23 | (Brazil) Alex Oliveira | | (substituted on) 102' |
| FW | 7 | (Brazil) Donizete | | (substituted on) 111' |
Manager:
(Brazil) Antônio Lopes

Assistant referees:
Jens Larsen (Denmark)
Fernando Cresci (Uruguay)
Fourth official:
William Mattus (Costa Rica)
