= 2001 CR Vasco da Gama season =

Vasco da Gama
2001 season
- Chairman: Eurico Miranda since 22 January (Antônio Soares Calçada until 21 January)
- Manager: Paulo César Gusmão (a.i.) since 19 October (Hélio dos Anjos since 13 August until 18 October) (Abel since 5 March until 1 June) (Joel Santana until 13 August)
- Stadium: São Januário; Maracanã
- Campeonato Brasileiro Série A: League stage: 11th
- Campeonato Carioca: Runners-up; Guanabara Tournament: Semifinals; Rio de Janeiro Tournament: Champions
- Copa Libertadores: Quarterfinals
- Copa Mercosur: Group stage
- Torneio Rio–São Paulo: Group stage
| Home colours | Away colours |

The 2001 season was Club de Regatas Vasco da Gama's 103rd year in existence, the club's 86th season in existence of football, and the club's 31st season playing in the Campeonato Brasileiro Série A, the top flight of Brazilian football.

Vasco da Gama was not able to be on Copa do Brasil due to be on Copa Libertadores and its scheduling conflicts.

== Players ==
=== Squad information ===
As of 31 December 2001

| No. | Name | Nationality | Position(s) | Date of birth (age) | Signed from |
Goalkeepers
| | Helton | (Brazil) | GK | 18 May 1978 (aged 23) | Youth system |
| | Fábio | (Brazil) | GK | 30 September 1980 (aged 21) | (Brazil) União Bandeirante |
| | Márcio | (Brazil) | GK | 16 March 1971 (aged 30) | Youth system |
Defenders
| | Rafael | (Brazil) | RB / RW | 13 March 1980 (aged 21) | (Brazil) Guarani |
| | Patrício (on loan from Kindermann) | (Brazil) | RB | 8 October 1974 (aged 27) | (Brazil) Coritiba (on loan from Kindermann) |
| | Andrezinho | (Azerbaijan) | RB / RWM | 19 February 1975 (aged 26) | (Brazil) Olaria |
| | Odvan | (Brazil) | CB | 26 March 1974 (aged 27) | (Brazil) Americano |
| | João Carlos | (Brazil) | CB | 1 January 1982 (aged 19) | Youth system |
| | Géder | (Brazil) | CB | 23 April 1978 (aged 23) | Youth system |
| | André Leone | (Brazil) | CB | 12 February 1979 (aged 22) | (Italy) Vicenza Calcio |
| | Alexandre Torres | (Brazil) | CB | 22 August 1966 (aged 35) | (Japan) Nagoya Grampus |
| | Valdo (on loan from Feirense) | (Brazil) | CB / RB | 11 December 1979 (aged 22) | (Brazil) Feirense |
| | Paulo César Madureira | (Brazil) | CB | 14 November 1978 (aged 23) | (Brazil) Madureira |
| | Gilberto | (Brazil) | LB / LWM | 25 April 1976 (aged 25) | (Italy) Inter Milan |
| | Edinho | (Brazil) | LB / LW | 30 October 1979 (aged 22) | (Brazil) Madureira |
Midfielders
| | Fabiano Eller | (Brazil) | DMF / LSM / CB | 19 November 1977 (aged 24) | Youth system |
| | Ricardo Bóvio (youth player) | (Brazil) | DMF | 17 January 1982 (aged 19) | Youth system |
| | Wagner | (Brazil) | DMF / CB / RB | 6 March 1974 (aged 27) | (Brazil) Juazeiro |
| | Jamir | (Brazil) | DMF / CMF | 13 May 1972 (aged 29) | (Peru) Coronel Bolognesi |
| | João Paulo (youth player) | (Brazil) | DMF / CB / CMF | 17 July 1983 (aged 18) | Youth system |
| | Jorginho | (Brazil) | RSM / RB | 17 August 1974 (aged 27) | (Brazil) São Paulo |
| | Donizete Oliveira | (Brazil) | CMF / DMF | 21 February 1968 (aged 33) | (Japan) Urawa Red Diamonds |
| | William Feijó | (Brazil) | DMF / CMF | 13 May 1972 (aged 29) | (Brazil) Americano (on loan from Flamengo) |
| | Léo Lima (youth player) | (Brazil) | CMF / AMF | 14 January 1982 (aged 19) | Youth system |
| | Juninho Paulista (on loan from Atlético Madrid) | (Brazil) | AMF | 22 February 1973 (aged 28) | (England) Middlesbrough (on loan from Atlético Madrid) |
| | Geovani (youth player) | (Brazil) | AMF / SS | 20 September 1982 (aged 19) | Youth system |
| | Raphael Botti (youth player) | (Brazil) | AMF | 23 February 1981 (aged 20) | Youth system |
| | Diogo Siston (youth player) | (Brazil) | AMF | 25 January 1981 (aged 20) | Youth system |
Forwards
| | Euller | (Brazil) | SS / RW / LW | 15 March 1971 (aged 30) | (Brazil) Palmeiras |
| | Ely Thadeu (youth player) | (Brazil) | LW / RW / SS | 12 August 1982 (aged 19) | Youth system |
| | Bebeto | (Brazil) | AT | 16 February 1964 (aged 37) | (Brazil) Vitória |
| | Dedé Anderson | (Brazil) | LW / ST / RW | 26 May 1980 (aged 21) | (Brazil) Bahia (on loan) |
| | Romário | (Brazil) | ST | 29 January 1966 (aged 35) | (Brazil) Flamengo |
| | Paulo César | (Brazil) | ST | 2 June 1978 (aged 23) | (Brazil) Madureira |
| | Souza | (Brazil) | ST | 4 March 1982 (aged 19) | (Brazil) Madureira |
| | Léo Macaé (youth player) | (Brazil) | AT | 28 March 1983 (aged 18) | Youth system |

== Competitions ==
=== Campeonato Brasileiro Série A ===
==== League stage ====
===== League table =====
| Pos | Team | Pld | W | D | L | GF | GA | GD | Pts | Qualification |
|---|---|---|---|---|---|---|---|---|---|---|
| 9 | Internacional | 27 | 12 | 4 | 11 | 38 | 40 | −2 | 40 | Intermediate zone |
| 10 | Goiás | 27 | 12 | 3 | 12 | 38 | 32 | +6 | 39 | Intermediate zone |
| 11 | Vasco | 27 | 10 | 9 | 8 | 57 | 36 | +21 | 39 | Intermediate zone |
| 12 | Palmeiras | 27 | 12 | 2 | 13 | 39 | 48 | −9 | 38 | Intermediate zone |
| 13 | Portuguesa | 27 | 11 | 4 | 12 | 31 | 33 | −2 | 37 | Intermediate zone |

=== Copa Libertadores ===
Vasco da Gama joined the competition in the group stage.
