= Valkmar =

Brazilian footballer (born 2006)

Personal information
- Full name: Valkmar da Silva Rocha
- Date of birth: 1 January 1977 (age 49)
- Place of birth: Cachoeiro de Itapemirim, Brazil
- Height: 1.87 m (6 ft 2 in)
- Position: Centre-back

Youth career
- –1997: Vasco da Gama

Senior career*
Years	Team	Apps	(Gls)
1995–2001	Vasco da Gama	22	(0)
1999	→ Atlético Goianiense (loan)	15	(0)
2000	→ Americano (loan)	11	(0)
2001–2002	Treze		
2002	União São João		
2002	America-RJ		
2002	Americano		
2003	Anapolina	14	(0)
2004	Caxias	2	(0)
2005–2006	Campinense		
2006	Botafogo-PB		
2007	CFZ-RJ		
- * Club domestic league appearances and goals

Valkmar da Silva Rocha (born 1 January 1977), known simply as Valkmar, is a Brazilian former professional footballer who played as a centre-back.

== Playing career ==
Valkmar was part of the youth system at Vasco da Gama and he was promoted to the first team during the 1995 season. He debuted on 21 October 1995 during the 1–1 draw against Olaria in the Copa Rio. He played one match as a substitute during the 1998 Campeonato Brasileiro Série A, and he spent part of the 1999 season on loan with Atlético Goianiense. In 2000, he spent the early part of 2000 on loan with Americano. He later returned to Vasco da Gama and won the Campeonato Brasileiro Série A, and the Copa Mercosur, and he reached the final of the 2000 FIFA Club World Championship against Corinthians.

Valkmar left Vasco da Gama in 2001 and he joined Treze, where he made two appearances in the Copa do Brasil and won the 2001 Campeonato Paraibano, before he joined União São João in early 2002. In 2002, he also played for America-RJ, and again for Americano. In 2003, he joined Anapolina and helped them avoid relegation to Série C.

In 2004, Valkmar joined Caxias before playing for Campinense between 2005 and 2006, Botafogo-PB in 2006, and ending his career in 2007 at CFZ-RJ.

== Coaching career ==
After 2007, Valkmar joined the youth coaching and scouting administration at Vasco da Gama.

== Personal life ==
Valkmar's son, Rayan, also played for Vasco da Gama, representing the club as a forward between 2023 and 2026.

== Career statistics ==
Appearances and goals by club, season and competition (incomplete)
Club	Season	League			State league (Note: Includes Campeonato Carioca, Campeonato Goiano, Campeonato Paraibano)		Copa do Brasil		Continental		Total	
Club	Season	Division	Apps	Goals	Apps	Goals	Apps	Goals	Apps	Goals	Apps	Goals
Vasco da Gama	1995	Série A	0	0	4	0	0	0	—		4	0
Vasco da Gama	1996	Série A	0	0	0	0	0	0	—		0	0
Vasco da Gama	1997	Série A	0	0	0	0	0	0	0	0	0	0
Vasco da Gama	1998	Série A	1	0	0	0	0	0	0	0	1	0
Vasco da Gama	1999	Série A	3	0	—		—		—		3	0
Vasco da Gama	2000	Série A	13	0	1	0	0	0	2 (Note: Appearances in Copa Mercosur)	0	15	0
Vasco da Gama	2001	Série A	—		1	0	—		—		1	0
Atlético Goianiense (loan)	1999	—			15	0	—		—		15	0
Americano (loan)	2000	Série B	11	0	—		2	0	—		13	0
Americano (loan)	Total		28	0	21	0	2	0	2	0	52	0
Treze	2001	Série C					2	0	—		2	0
Anapolina	2003	Série B	14	0	0	0	0	0	—		14	0
Caxias	2004	Série B	0	0	2	0	—		—		2	0
Career total			42	0	21	0	4	0	2	0	70	0

== Honours ==
Vasco da Gama

- Campeonato Brasileiro Série A: 2000
- Campeonato Carioca: runner-up 2000
- Copa Mercosur: 2000
- FIFA Club World Championship: runner-up 2000

Treze

- Campeonato Paraibano: 2001
