= Maricá (footballer) =

Brazilian footballer

Personal information
- Full name: Sérgio Silva de Souza Júnior
- Date of birth: 24 September 1979 (age 47)
- Place of birth: Maricá, Brazil
- Height: 1.72 m (5 ft 8 in)
- Position: Right back

Youth career
- –1997: Vasco da Gama

Senior career*
Years	Team	Apps	(Gls)
1997–2005	Vasco da Gama	135	(3)
2001	→ Santa Cruz (loan)		
2001	→ AEK Athens (loan)	11	(0)
2002	→ Internacional (loan)		
2003	→ América-SP (loan)		
2003	→ Avaí (loan)		
2004–2006	Aris	15	(1)
2006	Brasiliense		
2007	Bahia		
2007	Goytacaz		
2008	Metropolitano		
2009	Mesquita		
2009	Ypiranga de Erechim		
2010	Cabense		
2011	União Rondonópolis		
2011–2013	Independência-AC		
2013–2014	Angra dos Reis		
2015	Nacional Borbense		

International career
1995	Brazil U17	3	(0)
- * Club domestic league appearances and goals as of 2 October 2023

Sérgio Silva de Souza Júnior (born 24 September 1979), better known as Maricá, is a Brazilian former professional footballer, who played as a right back.

== Club career ==
Maricá started his career at Vasco da Gama, standing out mainly in the 1997 Campeonato Brasileiro campaign. He played for several years at Vasco, accumulating titles, until January 2001, when he was loaned to Santa Cruz. He was unable to repeat his previous achievements, moving from club to club over the years. On 10 August 2001 he was loaned to the Greek side, AEK Athens He did not manage to fit within the roster and on 28 December his loan was terminated. Aftewards, he had brief loans to Internacional, América-SP and Avaí.

In 28 January 2004 he left Vasco and returned to Greece joining Aris, where he played for two seasons. He then had short spells in various clubs, such as Brasiliense, Bahia, Goytacaz, Metropolitano, Mesquita, Ypiranga de Erechim, Cabense, União Rondonópolis, Independência-AC, Angra dos Reis and Nacional Borbense, where he ended his career in 2015.

== International career ==
Maricá played with Brazil U17 at the 1995 World Cup.

== Honours ==
Vasco da Gama

- Campeonato Brasileiro: 1997, 2000
- Copa Libertadores: 1998
- Campeonato Carioca: 1998
- Torneio Rio-São Paulo: 1999
- Copa Mercosur: 2000
