= Márcio Cazorla =

Brazilian footballer

Márcio
Personal information
- Full name: Márcio Fernandez Cazorla
- Date of birth: 16 March 1971 (age 55)
- Place of birth: Porto Alegre, Brazil
- Height: 1.88 m (6 ft 2 in)
- Position: Goalkeeper

Youth career
- 1986–1992: Vasco da Gama

Senior career*
Years	Team	Apps	(Gls)
1992–2004	Vasco da Gama	113	(0)
1992	→ Americano (loan)		
1995	→ Olaria (loan)		
1996	→ Americano (loan)		
- * Club domestic league appearances and goals as of 19 January 2024

Márcio Fernandez Cazorla (born 16 March 1971), simply known as Márcio or Márcio Cazorla, is a Brazilian former professional footballer who played as a goalkeeper.

== Career ==
Reserve goalkeeper for Vasco in the 90s and early 2000s, he was a substitute for big names like Carlos Germano and Helton. Still, he played 113 matches and participated in the club's conquest of several clubs. He ended his career in 2004 after having problems with late salary payments.

== Honours ==
Vasco da Gama

- Copa Libertadores: 1998
- Campeonato Brasileiro: 1997, 2000
- Campeonato Carioca: 1992, 1993, 1994, 1998, 2003
- Taça Guanabara: 1992, 1994, 1998, 2000
- Taça Rio: 1992, 1993, 1999, 2001
- Torneio Rio-São Paulo: 1999
- Copa Mercosur: 2000
- Ciutat de Barcelona Trophy: 1993
- Trofeo Ciudad de Zaragoza: 1993
- Torneio João Havelange: 1993
