= Fabrício Carvalho (footballer, born January 1978) =

Brazilian footballer

Personal information
- Full name: Fabrício Carvalho Pereira
- Date of birth: 30 January 1978 (age 48)
- Place of birth: Rio de Janeiro, Brazil
- Height: 1.70 m (5 ft 7 in)
- Position: Midfielder

Youth career
- 1996–1998: Vasco da Gama

Senior career*
Years	Team	Apps	(Gls)
1998–2001	Vasco da Gama		
1999	→ Ríver (loan)		
2000	→ Bangu (loan)		
2000	→ Bahia (loan)		
2001–2002	Leça		
2003	Joinville		
2003–2004	Hapoel Tel Aviv		
2004–2005	Hapoel Be'er Sheva		
2005–2006	Hapoel Kfar Saba		
2006	Bangu		
2007	Sivasspor		
2007	Rubro Social		
2008	Maccabi Akhi Nazareth		
2008	Itumbiara		
2009	Volta Redonda		
2009	CRAC		
2010	Remo		
2012	Santos-AP		
2012	Santa Helena		
2013–2014	Cabofriense		
2016	Sport Capixaba		

Managerial career
- 2018: São Mateus
- * Club domestic league appearances and goals as of 19 January 2024

Fabrício Carvalho Pereira (born 30 January 1978), better known as Fabrício Carvalho, is a Brazilian former professional footballer who played as a midfielder.

== Career ==
Formed in Vasco youth teams, he was part of the Brazilian champion squads of 1997 and 2000, of the Libertadores in 1998 and of other state titles. He also had a career outside the country, with Leça in Portugal and with some teams in Israel. He also played for lesser teams in Brazilian football, the last being Sport-ES in 2016.

In 2018 he had a brief experience as a coach at São Mateus.

== Honours ==
Vasco da Gama

- Copa Libertadores: 1998
- Campeonato Brasileiro: 1997, 2000
- Campeonato Carioca: 1998
- Taça Guanabara: 1998, 2000
- Taça Rio: 1999
- Torneio Rio-São Paulo: 1999
