= Paulo Miranda (footballer, born 1974) =

Brazilian football manager and former player

Personal information
- Full name: Paulo Miranda de Oliveira
- Date of birth: 25 January 1974 (age 52)
- Place of birth: São Paulo, Brazil
- Height: 1.86 m (6 ft 1 in)
- Positions: Defensive midfielder; right-back

Youth career
- Pinheiros
- Paraná

Senior career*
Years	Team	Apps	(Gls)
1991–1996	Paraná	18+	(4)
1997–1998	Atlético Paranaense		
1999–2001	Vasco da Gama	170	(8)
2001–2004	Bordeaux	42	(2)
2003	→ Cruzeiro (loan)		
2004	→ Flamengo (loan)		
2004–2006	São Caetano	21	(1)
2006	→ Coritiba (loan)		
2007	Itumbiara		
2008	Joinville		
2008	Chivas USA	10	(0)
2009	Santa Helena		
2010	Deportivo Anzoátegui		

International career
1992	Brazil U-20		

Managerial career
- 2013: Oeste (SC)
- 2014: Genus
- 2014: Francisco Beltrão
- 2014: Andraus
- * Club domestic league appearances and goals as of 13:14, 21 July 2015 (UTC)

Paulo Miranda de Oliveira (born 25 January 1974), known as Paulo Miranda is a Brazilian football manager and former professional footballer who played mainly as a midfielder and sometimes as a right-back.

== Career ==
Paulo Miranda started his professional career at Paraná in 1991. With Paraná, he won the Campeonato Paranaense five times in six years and helped the club to achieve promotion to Campeonato Brasileiro Série A. In 1997, he moved to rivals Atlético Paranaense and captained the team to the Campeonato Paranaense title in 1998.

In 1999, Paulo Miranda joined Vasco da Gama where he played alongside teammates with international experience such as Juninho Pernambucano and Romário and came to national attention. In the Rio de Janeiro club, he won titles such as 2000 Campeonato Brasileiro Série A (Copa João Havelange) and 2000 Copa Mercosur, also playing the 2000 FIFA Club World Championship Final as a right-back, losing to Corinthians in the penalty shoot-out.

In 2001, he moved abroad for the first time after being bought by Girondins de Bordeaux for 2,3 million Euros. He won the 2001–02 Coupe de la Ligue for the French side and returned to Brazil twice on loan after being overlooked by Elie Baup and Michel Pavon, playing for Cruzeiro in 2003, winning the Campeonato Mineiro of that year and in 2004 to play for Flamengo. He was later negotiated to São Caetano in the same year where he stayed until 2006, when he was loaned to Coritiba for the 2006 Campeonato Brasileiro Série B, becoming one of a few to play for the three Curitiba's big clubs. His time was plagued by injuries and his team failed to achieve promotion, while São Caetano was relegated to the 2nd division that year and he was released from his contract.

Paulo Miranda joined Itumbiara in 2007 for the Campeonato Goiano. The following year, he joined Joinville for the Campeonato Catarinense after unsuccessful negotiations with Juventus (SP). He had also a brief spell at Chivas USA, staying three months and playing 10 matches for the clu. He signed for Santa Helena for their debut season at Campeonato Goiano in 2009.

He joined Deportivo Anzoátegui in 2010. Even with offers from Rio de Janeiro clubs such as América and Olaria, he opted to move to Venezuela citing reasons such as payment on-time and opportunity to learn Spanish and seek an agent career after retirement. At the club, he played mostly as an attacking midfielder. He also trained at Paraná in 2011, but no deal was signed.

After conversations with Abel Braga and Marcelo Oliveira he pursued a career as a football manager. His first club was Oeste, from the third tier of Campeonato Catarinense. In 2014, he managed Genus in the Campeonato Rondoniense, later returning to Paraná state to Francisco Beltrão and later Andraus winning the 3rd division of Campeonato Paranaense.

== International ==
In 1992, he played for the Brazil U-20.

=== Honours ===
Paraná

- Campeonato Paranaense: 1991, 1993, 1994, 1995, 1996

Atlético Paranaense

- Campeonato Paranaense: 1998

Vasco da Gama

- Torneio Rio-São Paulo: 1999
- Campeonato Brasileiro Série A: 2000
- Copa Mercosur: 2000

Bordeaux

- Coupe de la Ligue: 2001-02

Cruzeiro

- Campeonato Mineiro: 2003
