= Alex Oliveira (footballer, born 1974) =

Brazilian footballer

Personal information
- Full name: Alex de Oliveira Freitas
- Date of birth: 21 January 1974 (age 52)
- Place of birth: Barra Mansa, Brazil
- Height: 1.79 m (5 ft 10 in)
- Position: Midfielder

Youth career
- –1996: Bragantino

Senior career*
Years	Team	Apps	(Gls)
1996	Bragantino		
1997	Atlético Mineiro		
1997–1998	Atlético Paranaense		
1999–2002	Vasco da Gama	131	(11)
2001	→ Bahia (loan)		
2002	Vila Nova		
2003	Fluminense	35	(6)
2003–2005	OFI		
2005	Brasiliense		
2006	Santa Cruz		
2006	Remo		
2007–2008	Vila Nova		
2009	Paulista		
2010	Madureira		
2010	Santa Cruz		
2011	Paysandu		
2011	Goiânia		
2012	Iporá		

Managerial career
- 2014: Ceilandense
- 2015: Paracatu
- 2016: Araguaína
- * Club domestic league appearances and goals as of 16 October 2024

Alex de Oliveira Freitas (born 21 January 1974), simply known as Alex Oliveira, is a Brazilian former professional footballer who played as a midfielder.

== Career ==
Revealed at Bragantino, Alex Oliveira stood out especially playing for CR Vasco da Gama, where he was Brazilian champion and the 2000 Copa Mercosur. He made 131 appearances and scored 11 goals for the club. In 2001 Oliveira was loaned to Bahia and participated in the state and Copa do Nordeste victories. He later played for Fluminense, OFI, Vila Nova, Brasiliense and Santa Cruz, as well as other clubs until he ended his career in 2012 at Iporá. Oliveira also had a brief coaching career from 2014 to 2016.

== Honours ==
Athletico Paranaense

- Campeonato Paranaense: 1998

Vasco da Gama

- Campeonato Brasileiro: 2000
- Copa Mercosur: 2000
- Torneio Rio-São Paulo: 1999
- Taça Guanabara: 2000
- Taça Rio: 1999

Bahia

- Campeonato Baiano: 2001
- Copa do Nordeste: 2001

Brasiliense

- Campeonato Brasiliense: 2005
