= Viola (footballer) =

Brazilian footballer

Personal information
- Full name: Paulo Sérgio Rosa
- Date of birth: 1 January 1969 (age 57)
- Place of birth: São Paulo, Brazil
- Height: 1.78 m (5 ft 10 in)
- Position: Forward

Team information
- Current team: Taboão da Serra

Senior career*
Years	Team	Apps	(Gls)
1988–1995	Corinthians	144	(49)
1990	→ São José (loan)	10	(1)
1991	→ Olímpia (loan)	15	(1)
1995–1996	Valencia	30	(10)
1996–1997	Palmeiras	36	(14)
1998–1999	Santos	28	(20)
1999–2001	Vasco da Gama	31	(6)
2001	Santos	24	(12)
2002–2003	Gaziantepspor	46	(18)
2004	Guarani	25	(10)
2005	Bahia	8	(4)
2006	Juventus (SP)	0	(0)
2007	Uberlândia	0	(0)
2008	Duque de Caxias	1	(1)
2008	Angra dos Reis	0	(0)
2009	Resende	0	(0)
2010	Brusque	0	(0)

International career^{‡}
1993–1995	Brazil	8	(2)
Medal record
Men's football
Representing Brazil
FIFA World Cup
Winner	1994 USA
- * Club domestic league appearances and goals as of 17 January 2008 ‡ National team caps and goals as of 17 January 2008

Paulo Sérgio Rosa, usually known as Viola (born 1 January 1969), is a Brazilian former footballer who played as a forward. He was given his nickname in his youth, which was a reference to the brand–name of his first pair of football boots.

== Career ==
Viola is famous for his strong personality on the pitch and great appearances in many teams he has played for throughout his long career. His first great appearance was in his second match, in the final game of the 1988 Campeonato Paulista (1st Division Championship of São Paulo State) between Corinthians and Guarani, regarded by the press as having a better team. Viola was called just because the main Corinthians forward, Edmar, was called by the Brazil national football team and then sold to Pescara – and because his main substitute, Marcos Roberto, was with a broken arm. Viola was not having a great offensive exhibition, but could score the title goal in the extra time – by putting his leg in the way of a lopsided shot from Wilson Mano, turning it into an assist.

Despite becoming a sudden star, Viola did not have a regular basis of good exhibitions and passed through some loanings until 1992 – he was not part of the first Corinthians title at Brasileirão, in 1990, when he was loaned to São José. He then had a reasonable year in 1992, no longer resembling the skinny boy from 1988. In 1993, Viola almost scored another title goal for Corinthians in the Campeonato Paulista, celebrating it with a pig imitation – mocking the Palmeiras nickname. But in the second final match, the rivals won the tournament. Nevertheless, Viola continued to celebrate his goals in joking ways, increasing his popularity. He was then first called by the Brazil team, going to 1993 Copa América and to 1994 FIFA World Cup when he came as a substitute in the extra time, bringing an electric performance to a tied game. Viola also ended 1994 as runner-up with Corinthians in the Brasileirão.

By the beginning of 1995, Viola was then sold to Valencia, but remained for more than six months in Corinthians, winning the Campeonato Paulista and the Copa do Brasil. However, he did not suit himself in Spain. Despite having reasonable goal numbers, he chose to come back to Brazil in mid-1996, even signing with Palmeiras. He did not have a regular frequency of good exhibitions, and left the club after the runner-up campaign in the 1997 Brasileirão, signing with Santos. He then earned good performances, leading the team to the semifinals of the Campeonato Paulista and of the Brasileirão, and to the 1998 Copa Conmebol title. He also ended the Brasileirão as top scorer. His career's last good moments were in Vasco da Gama, by 1999 and 2000, as a supporting member of the runner-up squad of 2000 FIFA Club World Championship and of the 2000 Copa Mercosur and Brasileirão champions.

Viola then had an unsuccessful return to Santos in 2001. In he left Brazil again to join Turkish side Gaziantepspor, where he scored 18 goals in 46 Super Lig matches during a 1 1/2-season spell. In mid-2003, back to Brazil, Viola would defend many other teams, alternating them with some showbol matches, and even a reality television show participation by 2010. His last coming back trial was in Taboão da Serra in 2015.

== Career statistics ==
=== Club ===
Appearances and goals by club, season and competition
Club	Season	League			State league		Cup		Continental		Other		Total	
Club	Season	Division	Apps	Goals	Apps	Goals	Apps	Goals	Apps	Goals	Apps	Goals	Apps	Goals
Corinthians	1988	Série A	18	3	–		–		–		–		18	3
Corinthians	1989	Série A	14	2	12	1	5	1	–		–		31	4
Corinthians	1990	Série A	0	0	20	2	–		–		–		20	2
Corinthians	1991	Série A	8	0	15	1	2	0	4	0	–		29	1
Corinthians	1992	Série A	17	8	24	6	3	0	–		–		44	14
Corinthians	1993	Série A	13	7	27	20	–		–		4	1	44	28
Corinthians	1994	Série A	21	5	27	19	2	0	2	4	2	2	54	30
Corinthians	1995	Série A	0	0	20	5	6	6	–		–		26	11
Corinthians	Total		91	25	145	54	18	7	6	4	6	3	266	93
São José (loan)	1990	Série A	10	1	–		–		–		–		10	1
Valencia	1995–96	La Liga	30	11	–		7	1	–		–		37	12
Palmeiras	1996	Série A	10	5	–		–		2	1	–		12	6
Palmeiras	1997	Série A	26	9	15	14	6	7	–		3	1	50	31
Palmeiras	Total		36	14	15	14	6	7	2	1	3	1	62	37
Santos	1998	Série A	28	21	4	1	5	5	6	4	–		43	31
Santos	1999	Série A	0	0	13	9	2	6	–		6	3	21	18
Santos	Total		28	21	17	10	7	11	6	4	6	3	64	49
Vasco da Gama	1999	Série A	16	4	–		–		5	1	–		21	5
Vasco da Gama	2000	Série A	19	4	3	2	5	0	11	2	7	1	45	9
Vasco da Gama	2001	Série A	0	0	15	4	–		6	7	3	2	24	13
Vasco da Gama	Total		35	8	18	6	5	0	22	10	10	3	90	27
Santos	2001	Série A	24	12	–		–		–		–		24	12
Gaziantepspor	2001–02	Super Lig	14	4	–		1	0	–		–		15	4
Gaziantepspor	2002–03	Super Lig	32	14	–		–		–		–		32	14
Gaziantepspor	Total		46	18	–		1	0	–		–		47	18
Guarani	2004	Série A	25	10	7	2	6	3	–		–		38	15
Bahia	2005	Série B	8	4	–		2	1	–		–		10	5
Career total			333	113	202	86	52	30	36	19	25	10	648	258

== Honours ==
Corinthians

- São Paulo State League: 1988, 1995
- Copa do Brasil: 1995

Santos

- Copa Conmebol: 1998

Vasco da Gama

- Brazilian League: 2000
- Copa Mercosur: 2000

Brazil

- FIFA World Cup: 1994

Individual

- São Paulo state league's top scorer: 1993
- Brazilian league's top scorer: 1998
- Copa Conmebol's top scorer: 1998
