= Nasa (footballer, born 1968) =

Brazilian footballer

Personal information
- Full name: Gesiel José de Lima
- Date of birth: December 8, 1968 (age 57)
- Place of birth: Olinda, Brazil
- Height: 1.74 m (5 ft 9 in)
- Position: Midfielder

Senior career*
Years	Team	Apps	(Gls)
1989–1991	Santa Cruz		
1991–1995	Ferroviário	1	(0)
1995	União São João		
1996	Comercial-SP		
1996	Moto Club	7	(0)
1997	Madureira		
1997–2001	Vasco da Gama	216	(3)
2001–2002	Yokohama F. Marinos	31	(6)
2003	América-PE		
2004	Icasa		
2005	Guarani de Juazeiro		
2005	Madureira	1	(0)
- * Club domestic league appearances and goals

Gesiel José de Lima, commonly known as Nasa (born December 8, 1968), is a Brazilian former professional footballer who played as a midfielder for several Série A clubs.

== Career ==
Born in Olinda, Nasa played for several clubs, such as Santa Cruz, Ferroviário, União São João, Comercial-SP, Moto Club, Madureira and Vasco da Gama. He played 70 Série A games for Vasco and scored one goal. Nasa defended Japanese club Yokohama F. Marinos in 2001 and in 2002. He then returned to Brazil and defended the following clubs: América-PE, Icasa, Guarani de Juazeiro and Madureira, retiring in 2005.

== Career statistics ==
Club performance			League		Cup		League Cup		Total	
Season	Club	League	Apps	Goals	Apps	Goals	Apps	Goals	Apps	Goals
Japan			League		Emperor's Cup		J.League Cup		Total	
2001	Yokohama F. Marinos	J1 League	11	1	1	0	4	0	16	1
2002	Yokohama F. Marinos	J1 League	20	5	1	0	6	0	27	5
Total			31	6	2	0	10	0	43	6

== Honors ==
Ferroviário

- Campeonato Cearense: 1994, 1995

Vasco da Gama

- Campeonato Carioca: 1998
- Torneio Rio-São Paulo :1999
- Série A : 1997, 2000
- Copa Mercosur: 2000
- Copa Libertadores 1998

Yokohama F. Marinos

- J1 League: 2002
