= Copa João Havelange Group Blue =

Copa João Havelange Group Blue was one of the three groups of 2000 season's first stage of the Campeonato Brasileiro Série A football league, named Copa João Havelange. It consists of 25 teams, 12 teams qualified to the final stages.

All team qualified for 2001 Campeonato Brasileiro Série A to avoid legal conflicts.

== Teams ==
Club	City	Stadium	1999 season
América	Belo Horizonte	Independência	Quarterfinalists in Série B
Atlético Mineiro	Belo Horizonte	Mineirão	Série A runners-up
Atlético Paranense	Curitiba	Arena da Baixada	9th in Série A
Bahia	Salvador	Fonte Nova	3rd in Série B
Botafogo	Rio de Janeiro	Maracanã	14th in Série A
Botafogo-SP	Ribeirão Preto	Santa Cruz	20th in Série A
Corinthians	São Paulo	Pacaembu	Série A Champion
Coritiba	Curitiba	Couto Pereira	13th in Série A
Cruzeiro	Belo Horizonte	Mineirão	5th in Série A
Flamengo	Rio de Janeiro	Maracanã	12th in Série A
Fluminense	Rio de Janeiro	Maracanã	Série C Champions
Gama	Brasília	Bezerrão	15th in Série A
Grêmio	Porto Alegre	Olímpico	18th in Série A
Goiás	Goiânia	Serra Dourada	Série B Champions
Guarani	Campinas	Brinco de Ouro	8th in Série A
Internacional	Porto Alegre	Beira-Rio	16th in Série A
Juventude	Caxias do Sul	Alfredo Jaconi	19th in Série A
Palmeiras	São Paulo	Parque Antárctica	10th in Série A
Paraná	Curitiba	Durival Britto	17th in Série A
Ponte Preta	Campinas	Moisés Lucarelli	6th in Série A
Portuguesa	São Paulo	Canindé	21st in Série A
São Paulo	São Paulo	Morumbi	4th in Série A
Santa Cruz	Recife	Arruda	Série B Runner-up
Santos	Santos	Vila Belmiro	11th in Série A
Sport Recife	Recife	Ilha do Retiro	22nd in Série A
Vasco da Gama	Rio de Janeiro	São Januário	7th in Série A
Vitória	Salvador	Barradão	3rd in Série A

== Final table ==
Pos	Team	Pld	W	D	L	GF	GA	GD	Pts
1	Cruzeiro (A)	24	12	9	3	46	27	+19	45
2	Sport Recife (A)	24	12	6	6	46	27	+19	42
3	Fluminense (A)	24	12	6	6	45	31	+14	42
4	Goiás (A)	24	11	8	5	41	29	+12	41
5	Vasco da Gama (A)	24	11	6	7	36	37	−1	39
6	São Paulo (A)	24	10	9	5	46	35	+11	39
7	Ponte Preta (A)	24	11	5	8	49	37	+12	38
8	Atlético Paranaense (A)	24	11	5	8	32	28	+4	38
9	Internacional (A)	24	10	8	6	34	25	+9	38
10	Grêmio (A)	24	10	7	7	37	31	+6	37
11	Palmeiras (A)	24	10	7	7	29	30	−1	37
12	Bahia (A)	24	10	6	8	29	30	−1	36
13	Guarani	24	9	8	7	29	29	0	35
14	Santos	24	9	6	9	38	31	+7	33
15	Flamengo	24	9	6	9	42	37	+5	33
16	Botafogo	24	9	5	10	31	35	−4	32
17	Portuguesa	24	9	5	10	34	43	−9	32
18	Vitória	24	9	4	11	44	40	+4	31
19	América Mineiro	24	7	6	11	26	35	−9	27
20	Atlético Mineiro	24	7	6	11	31	42	−11	27
21	Juventude	24	7	5	12	27	36	−9	26
22	Gama	24	6	4	14	22	39	−17	22
23	Coritiba	24	5	6	13	26	35	−9	21
24	Corinthians	24	4	4	16	26	46	−20	16
25	Santa Cruz	24	3	7	14	18	51	−33	16

Updated to match(es) played on 4 June 2009. Source: RSSSF
Rules for classification: 1) points; 2) goal difference; 3) number of goals scored.
(A) Advance to a further round
