= Robson Carioca =

Brazilian footballer

Personal information
- Full name: Robson da Silva Ourique
- Date of birth: 6 September 1975 (age 51)
- Place of birth: Rio de Janeiro, Brazil
- Height: 1.81 m (5 ft 11 1/2 in)
- Position: Forward

Senior career*
Years	Team	Apps	(Gls)
–2001	Olaria Atlético Clube		
2001–2002	Trabzonspor	32	(9)
2002–2004	Elazığspor	21	(6)
2004–	Olaria Atlético Clube		
2006	AA Portuguesa (RJ)		
2007	Rio Branco Sport Club		
- * Club domestic league appearances and goals

Robson da Silva Ourique also known as Robson Carioca (born 6 September 1975 in Rio de Janeiro) is a retired Brazilian professional footballer who played for Trabzonspor and Elazığspor in the Turkish Super Lig.
