= Jorginho Paulista =

Brazilian footballer (born 1980)

Personal information
- Full name: Jorge Henrique Amaral de Castro
- Date of birth: 20 February 1980 (age 46)
- Place of birth: São Paulo, Brazil
- Height: 1.77 m (5 ft 9 1/2 in)
- Positions: Left-back; winger

Senior career*
Years	Team	Apps	(Gls)
1997–1998	Palmeiras	1	(0)
1998–1999	PSV	2	(0)
1999	→ Udinese (loan)	0	(0)
1999–2002	Udinese	3	(0)
2000	→ Atlético-PR (loan)	0	(0)
2000–2001	→ Vasco (loan)	15	(1)
2001	→ Boca Juniors (loan)	11	(0)
2002	→ Cruzeiro (loan)	0	(0)
2002–2003	São Paulo	26	(2)
2003–2004	Botafogo	?	(?)
2005	Vasco	10	(0)
2006	Pumas de la UNAM	0	(0)
2006	→ Pumas Morelos	2	(0)
2007	Paulista	13	(1)
2009	Bragantino	0	(0)
2009	Campinense	3	(0)
2011	Ceilândia	0	(0)
2012	Marcílio Dias	0	(0)

International career
1997	Brazil U17		
- * Club domestic league appearances and goals

Jorge Henrique Amaral de Castro known as Jorginho Paulista or just Jorginho (born 20 February 1980) is a Brazilian former footballer who has played as a left-sided defender or midfielder.

== Club career ==
=== Udinese and loans ===
Discovered by PSV after 1997 FIFA U-17 World Championship, he joined Udinese on loan in January 1999. As the club run out of non-EU quota, Jorginho was unveiled as new player at the start of 1999–2000 season along with Warley with European Union status.

Jorginho made his debut on 28 November 1999, against Roma as starter, the match Udinese lost 0–2 to Roma at home.

He also moved back to Brazil on loan to Atlético Paranaense and played twice at 2000 Copa do Brasil.

In September 2000, Udinese traveled to Poland for the UEFA Cup match against Polonia Warsaw. But Polish officials discovered that the Portuguese passport of Warley and Alberto were fake. Later Jorginho's fake passport were also discovered . Warley and Jorginho were immediately transferred back to Brazil for Copa João Havelange, where Jorginho Paulista won the champion along with former Brazilian internationals Jorginho.

In June 2001, he was banned for 1 year for Italian football along with teammate Warley, Alejandro Da Silva and Alberto, and 9 other players were also banned from 6 months to 1 year. He was then loaned to Boca Juniors. In early 2002 he left for Cruzeiro to play as the backup of Juan Pablo Sorín.

He then left for São Paulo for a season, which he was injured from November to April.

=== Botafogo ===
In mid-2003 he left for Botafogo on loan and finished as Campeonato Brasileiro Série B runner-up.

Jorginho had declared he would like to return to Palmeiras in 2004 season but eventually remain at Botafogo.

=== Return to Vasco ===
In April 2005 he returned to Vasco, signing a one-year contract.

In December 2005, he left Vasco.

=== Mexico ===
He spent the 2006–07 season at Pumas Morelos, the feeder team of Pumas de la UNAM. He played twice at Primera División A, on round 2 and 3 of Apertura 2006.

=== Late career ===
He then trailed at Russia to join Lokomotiv Moskva but failed to form a contract., In May 2007, he signed a contract with Paulista until the end of Campeonato Brasileiro Série B 2007. He was the regular of Paulista but lost his place in the second half of the season.

He then trailed at Boavista, Dalian and Real Salt Lake.

In February 2009 he joined Bragantino for 2009 Campeonato Paulista. At the start of Campeonato Brasileiro Série B he left for Campinense, the league rival of Bragantino. He was released in June 2009.

In February 2010, he trialed at Avaí but failed to get a contract. A year later, he was signed by Ceilândia, a team from Federal District.

After a few months with Marcílio Dias in 2012 Campeonato Catarinense (1 appearance), he left for Esporte Clube Flamengo of Piauí state.

== International career ==
With Brazil, Jorginho won the 1997 FIFA U-17 World Championship along with Fábio, Fábio Pinto, Diogo Rincón, Matuzalém, Ronaldinho and Geovanni.

== Honours ==
=== Club ===
- Vasco
  - 2000 Copa Mercosur
  - Copa João Havelange
- PSV Eindhoven
  - 1998 Johan Cruyff Shield

=== International ===
- Brazil
  - 1997 FIFA U-17 World Championship
