= Joelson (footballer, born 1980) =

Brazilian footballer

Personal information
- Full name: Joelson Santos Silva
- Date of birth: November 19, 1980 (age 45)
- Place of birth: Uruçuca-BA, Brazil
- Height: 1.79 m (5 ft 10 in)
- Position: Attacking midfielder

Team information
- Current team: Villa Nova

Youth career
- 1999: SD Serra-ES

Senior career*
Years	Team	Apps	(Gls)
2000	Cruzeiro		
2000	Santa Cruz		
2001	Juventude	13	(1)
2002	Vila Nova	5	(0)
2003	Democrata		
2003–2004	Avaí		
2005	Paraná	8	(0)
2005–2006	Ituano		
2005–2006	→ Al-Hilal (loan)		
2006–2008	Paraná		
2007	→ Avaí (loan)		
2008–2009	Avaí		
2009	→ Mogi Mirim (loan)		
2009	Bahia	5	(0)
2010	Vila Nova	4	(0)
2011–2012	Marcílio Dias		
2012	→ Uberlândia (loan)		
2013	Betim		
2013–	Villa Nova	3	(0)
- * Club domestic league appearances and goals

Joelson Santos Silva (born November 19, 1980, in Uruçuca-BA), or simply Joelson, is a Brazilian attacking midfielder for Villa Nova Atlético Clube.

== Contract ==
- 6 July 2006 to 6 July 2009
