= 2000 Torneio Rio-São Paulo =

Torneio Rio-São Paulo
- Season: 2000
- Champions: Palmeiras (5th title)
- Matches played: 30
- Goals scored: 96 (3.2 per match)
- Top goalscorer: Romário (Vasco da Gama) – 12 goals
- Biggest home win: Palmeiras 6–2 Fluminense (Jan 30)
- Biggest away win: Santos 0–3 Botafogo (Jan 22); São Paulo 0–3 Vasco (Feb 19)

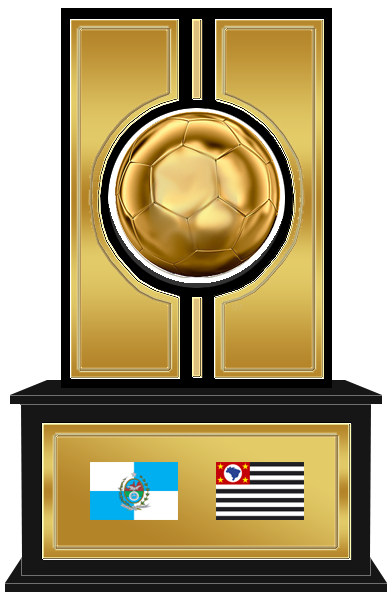
Torneio Rio-São Paulo

The 2000 Torneio Rio São Paulo was the 24th edition of the Torneio Rio-São Paulo. It was disputed between 22 January to 1 March 2000.

== Participants ==
Team	City	Ground	Nº participations	Best result
Botafogo	(Rio de Janeiro (state)) Rio de Janeiro	Maracanã	21	Champions: 1962, 1964 (shared), 1966 (shared), 1998
Corinthians	(São Paulo (state)) São Paulo	Pacaembu	24	Champions: 1950, 1953, 1954, 1966 (shared)
Flamengo	(Rio de Janeiro (state)) Rio de Janeiro	Maracanã	23	Champions: 1961
Fluminense	(Rio de Janeiro (state)) Rio de Janeiro	Maracanã	23	Champions: 1957, 1960
Palmeiras	(São Paulo (state)) São Paulo	Parque Antártica	24	Champions: 1933, 1951, 1965, 1993
Santos	(São Paulo (state)) Santos	Vila Belmiro	20	Champions: 1959, 1963, 1964 (shared), 1966 (shared), 1997
São Paulo	(São Paulo (state)) São Paulo	Morumbi	23	Runners-up: 1933, 1962, 1998
Vasco da Gama	(Rio de Janeiro (state)) Rio de Janeiro	São Januário	24	Champions: 1958, 1966 (shared), 1999

== Format ==
The clubs were separated in two groups: Group A and Group B, playing a double round-robin in each group, with the two best clubs advanced to semifinals. The winners of semifinals, advanced to the finals.

== Tournament ==
Following is the summary of the 2000 Torneio Rio-São Paulo tournament:

=== Group A ===
Pos	Team	Pld	W	D	L	GF	GA	GD	Pts	Qualification
1	(São Paulo (state)) São Paulo	6	4	0	2	13	12	+1	12	Qualified to semifinals
2	(Rio de Janeiro (state)) Botafogo	6	3	1	2	11	8	+3	10	Qualified to semifinals
3	(Rio de Janeiro (state)) Flamengo	6	2	2	2	14	10	+4	8	
4	(São Paulo (state)) Santos	6	1	1	4	6	14	−8	4	

Source: RSSSF
Rules for classification: 1) points; 2) wins; 3) goal difference; 4) goals for.

=== Group B ===
Pos	Team	Pld	W	D	L	GF	GA	GD	Pts	Qualification
1	(São Paulo (state)) Palmeiras	6	4	1	1	17	9	+8	13	Qualified to semifinals
2	(Rio de Janeiro (state)) Vasco da Gama	6	3	2	1	9	7	+2	11	Qualified to semifinals
3	(São Paulo (state)) Corinthians	6	2	1	3	5	7	−2	7	
4	(Rio de Janeiro (state)) Fluminense	6	1	0	5	4	12	−8	3	

Source: RSSSF
Rules for classification: 1) points; 2) wins; 3) goal difference; 4) goals for.

=== Semifinals ===
Team 1	Agg.	Team 2	1st leg	2nd leg
São Paulo	1–5	Vasco da Gama	0–3	1–2
Palmeiras	3–1	Botafogo	0–0	3–1

=== Finals ===
26 February 2000

Vasco da Gama (Rio de Janeiro (state))	1–2	(São Paulo (state)) Palmeiras
Romário 77'	Report	César Sampaio 15'; Pena 68'

Maracanã, Rio de Janeiro
Attendance: 23,484
Referee: Sálvio Spínola

1 March 2000

Palmeiras (São Paulo (state))	4–0	(Rio de Janeiro (state)) Vasco da Gama
Pena 28'; Argel 32'; Euller 34'; Arce 68'	Report

Morumbi, São Paulo
Referee: Jorge Travassos

== Top scorers ==
Rank	Player	Club	Goals
1	Romário	Vasco da Gama	12
2	Euller	Palmeiras	7
3	França	São Paulo	5
