= Filipe Alvim =

Brazilian footballer

Personal information
- Full name: Filipe Alvim Maluf
- Date of birth: 13 November 1979 (age 46)
- Place of birth: Rio de Janeiro, Brazil
- Position: Defender

Youth career
- 1993–1997: Vasco da Gama

Senior career*
Years	Team	Apps	(Gls)
1997–2001	Vasco da Gama		
1998	→ Atlético Goianiense (loan)		
1999	→ Santa Cruz (loan)		
2000	→ Bahia (loan)		
2001	→ Coritiba (loan)		
2002–2003	Juventude		
2004–2005	Académica		
2004	→ Corinthians (loan)	17	(0)

International career
1999	Brazil U20		
- * Club domestic league appearances and goals as of 21 October 2023

Filipe Alvim (born 13 November 1979), is a Brazilian former professional footballer who played as a defender.

== Career ==
A versatile defender, he began his career at Vasco, being part of the Brazilian champion squads in 1997 and the 1998 Copa Libertadores. He played for Brazil's youth teams and EC Juventude, until he was negotiated with AA Académica de Portugal.

Filipe, who felt constant discomfort and shortness of breath, ended his career prematurely at the age of 26 after being diagnosed with cardiac arrhythmia.

== Personal life ==
He is currently a preacher at a church in the city of Juiz de Fora.

== Honours ==
Vasco da Gama

- Campeonato Brasileiro: 1997
- Copa Libertadores: 1998
- Torneio Rio-São Paulo: 1999
