= Estádio Palestra Itália =

Football stadium in Brazil

Coordinates: 23°31′39.2″S 46°40′42.3″W

- Parque Antártica
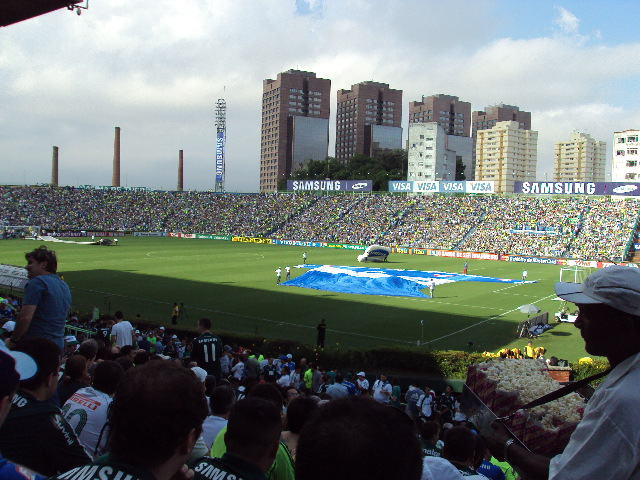
- Interactive map of Estádio Palestra Itália
- Full name: Estádio Palestra Itália
- Former names: Parque Antártica
- Location: São Paulo, SP, Brazil
- Owner: Palmeiras
- Operator: Palmeiras
- Capacity: 27,650
- Surface: Grass
- Field size: 110 x 75 m

Construction
- Built: 1900–1901
- Opened: 3 May 1902
- Renovated: 1933, 1950, 1962 and 2008
- Expanded: 1992, 2010
- Closed: 9 July 2010
- Demolished: November 2010

Tenant
- Palmeiras (1917–2010)

The Palestra Itália Stadium (Portuguese: Estádio Palestra Itália) was a football stadium located in Barra Funda, São Paulo, standing on the site now occupied by the Allianz Parque stadium. It was the home ground of Sociedade Esportiva Palmeiras from 1917 to 2010, and was also known as Parque Antártica after Companhia Antarctica de Bebidas, a beverages company from which Palmeiras acquired the property in 1920. In the past its capacity was listed as 35,000 spectators, however, even though its grandstands have been extended in the late 1990s, the stadium had 27,650 seats due to regulations enforcing improved safety and comfort, before was demolished in November 2010.

It was one of the most important Brazilian stadiums, considering the amount of decisive and important matches played there, most of them with the presence of Palmeiras. Examples of games played in Palestra Itália include the second leg of the 1999 Copa Libertadores Finals, the Copa Mercosur finals of 1998, 1999 and 2000, 1996 Copa do Brasil final and several Campeonato Paulista finals.

One of the 2000 Campeonato Brasileiro Série A final matches, between São Caetano and Vasco was played at Palestra Itália. One of the 2004 Copa do Brasil final matches, between Santo André and Flamengo was played there too.

Besides football matches, the Palestra Itália Stadium, often hosted important Brazilian and international musical events because of its central location in São Paulo, like A-ha, Human Rights Now!, Ozzy Osbourne, Iron Maiden, Metallica, Aerosmith, David Bowie and Guns N' Roses.

On 22 May 2010, Palmeiras played against Grêmio for the Série A on Palestra Itália, it was the last official game played by Palmeiras in the stadium due to the beginning of the new stadium's construction. The last match played by Palmeiras on Palestra Italia was a friendly against Boca Juniors on 9 July 2010.

== Statistics ==
First match

- Palestra Itália 5–1 Internacional-SP (21 April 1917)

First match as the stadium's owner

- Palestra Itália 7–0 Mackenzie (16 May 1920)

Last competitive match

- Palmeiras 4–2 Grêmio (Campeonato Brasileiro, 22 May 2010)

Last match

- Palmeiras 0–2 Boca Juniors (Friendly, 9 July 2010 – Attendance: 17,786)

Largest victory

- Palestra Itália 11–0 Internacional-SP (8 August 1920)

Thousandth victory

- Palmeiras 2–0 Grêmio (Campeonato Brasileiro, 6 October 2007 – Attendance: 22,667)

Record attendance

- 40,283, Palmeiras 1–0 XV de Piracicaba (Campeonato Paulista, 18 August 1976)

Longest unbeaten run

- 68 games, Palmeiras (1986–1990)

Most appearances

- Marcos, 211 games (1996–2010)

Most goals scored

- Heitor, 173 goals – 1.005 per match (1916–1931)

Source: Palmeiras official website

== Final record of results ==
=== Palmeiras ===
Palmeiras' complete competitive record at Palestra Itália Stadium is as follows:

- 1572 games played
- 1064 wins (67.7%)
- 319 draws (20.3%)
- 189 losses (12%)
- 3700 goals scored (2.35 per match)
- 1488 goals conceded (0.94 per match)
- 2212 goal difference

Source: Palmeiras official website
