= Márcio Rezende de Freitas =

Brazilian football referee

Márcio Rezende de Freitas (born December 22, 1960, in Timóteo) is a former Brazilian football (soccer) referee. He has refereed more than 1100 games, 269 of these in national championships, between 1989 and 2005. He was present in the World Championship and at the Olympic Games.
