= Carlos Germano =

Brazilian footballer (born 1970)

Personal information
- Full name: Carlos Germano Schwambach Neto
- Date of birth: 14 August 1970 (age 56)
- Place of birth: Domingos Martins, Brazil
- Height: 1.90 m (6 ft 3 in)
- Position: Goalkeeper

Youth career
- 1985–1991: Vasco da Gama

Senior career*
Years	Team	Apps	(Gls)
1991–1999	Vasco da Gama	449	(0)
2000	Santos	20	(0)
2001	Portuguesa	35	(0)
2002	Internacional	24	(0)
2002	Botafogo	24	(0)
2003	Paysandu	23	(0)
2004	América	11	(0)
2004	Vasco da Gama	0	(0)
2005	Madureira	4	(0)
2005–2006	Penafiel	0	(0)

International career
1995–1998	Brazil	9	(0)
- * Club domestic league appearances and goals

Carlos Germano Schwambach Neto (born 14 August 1970), better known as Carlos Germano, is a former Brazilian footballer who played goalkeeper.

He was a member of the Brazilian squads that won the 1997 Copa América and that reached the final of the 1998 FIFA World Cup in France.

== Club career ==
He began his football career in 1985 in his native town, and was discovered by Vasco's manager who proposed that he join the youth team for a test. In the same year he became the first choice goalkeeper for the youth side.

When Vasco's senior goalkeeper Acácio left the club, Carlos Germano became the number 1 immediately. He went to receive all of the club honours and was chosen top goalkeeper of the Brazilian Championship in 1997.

In 1999, he had some disagreements with Vasco's chairman and left the club. He signed with Santos in 2000 for four years, but one year later the club could not pay the total amount of the contract and he obtained the right to a free transfer, moving to Portuguesa. From then on, he signed one year contracts with different clubs, including his first club (Vasco), until he signed with FC Penafiel (Portuguese side at the time in the second division) in 2005.

== International career ==
Carlos Germano represented his country at the 1987 FIFA U-16 World Championship and the 1989 FIFA World Youth Championship. In 1988, he was chosen as Brazil's goalkeeper in the South American U-20 Championship.

He went on to earn 9 senior caps for Brazil between 1995 and 1998.

== Coaching career ==
After retiring at the end of the 2005–06 Portuguese season, he subsequently embraced a career as a goalkeeping coach.

== Honours ==
=== Club ===
Vasco da Gama

- Campeonato Carioca: 1992, 1993, 1994, 1998
- Taça Guanabara: 1992, 1994, 1998
- Campeonato Brasileiro Série A: 1997
- Copa Libertadores: 1998
- Torneio Rio-São Paulo: 1999
- FIFA Club World Cup runner-up: 2000

=== International ===
Brazil

- Copa América: 1997

=== Individual ===
- Silver Ball (Placar): 1997
