= Dedé (footballer, born 1980) =

Brazilian footballer

Personal information
- Full name: Anderson de Oliveira Gomes
- Date of birth: 26 May 1980 (age 46)
- Place of birth: Brazil
- Position: Forward

Senior career*
| Years | Team | Apps | (Gls) |
| 1998–2001 | Vasco | 17 | (4) |
| 1999–2000 | → Bahia (loan) | 21 | (5) |
| 2001–2003 | Litex | 21 | (5) |
| 2003 | Hammarby IF | 12 | (8) |
| 2004–2005 | Kalmar FF | 35 | (15) |
| 2006–2009 | Aalesund | 20 | (14) |
| Total | | 126 | (51) |
- * Club domestic league appearances and goals

Dedé Anderson de Oliveira Gomes (born 26 May 1980) is a Brazilian former professional footballer who played as a forward for Bulgarian club Litex, Swedish clubs Hammarby IF and Kalmar FF, and Norwegian club Aalesund.

== Career ==
He began his career playing for Vasco da Gama and Bahia in the Campeonato Brasileiro.

He made a name for himself in Scandinavia after joining Swedish club Hammarby IF in 2003, where he had a successful spell, scoring 8 goals in his first season. The next season, he joined fellow top division side Kalmar FF scoring 10 league goals in 2004 and 6 in 2005 before leaving Kalmar FF under a cloud to join Norwegian First Division side Aalesund at the start of the 2006 season.

He punched Toni Kallio from rival club Molde FK in a pre-season friendly and got suspended the first three games of the 2006 season. He later made a strong impact in his first season alongside fellow striker Tor Hogne Aarøy, scoring 14 league goals and helping Aalesund to second place and promotion to Tippeligaen, the Norwegian top division.

He returned to Brazil for the holidays after the season ended in November, but did not report back for training in January as agreed and was subsequently suspended by Aalesund in March 2007. He was later granted a one-year unpaid leave from the club with an agreement to be back in training by 3 January 2008, but again he did not report back as scheduled. In January 2009 he finally returned to Ålesund determined to play out the final season of his contract with Aalesund. However, manager Kjetil Rekdal deemed him unfit for top-level football. After two months of training, during which his progress was hampered by injury, the club opted to release him from his contract in March 2009.
