= Mauro Galvão =

Brazilian footballer and manager

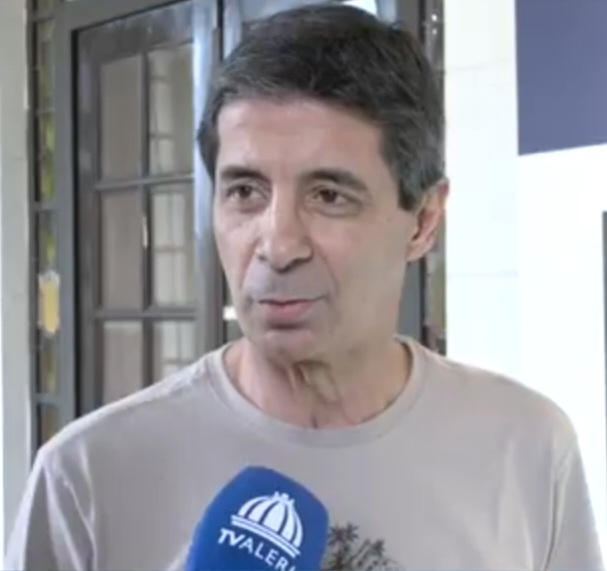
- Mauro Galvão in 2025

Personal information
- Full name: Mauro Geraldo Galvão
- Date of birth: 19 December 1961 (age 64)
- Place of birth: Porto Alegre, Brazil
- Height: 1.80 m (5 ft 11 in)
- Position: Sweeper

Senior career*
Years	Team	Apps	(Gls)
1979–1986	Internacional	140	(6)
1986–1987	Bangu	67	(3)
1987–1990	Botafogo	99	(1)
1990–1996	Lugano	194	(20)
1996–1997	Grêmio	59	(3)
1997–2000	Vasco da Gama	108	(7)
2001	Grêmio	60	(2)
Total		496	(28)

International career
1986–1990	Brazil	24	(0)

Managerial career
- 2003: Vasco da Gama
- 2004: Botafogo
- 2005: Náutico
- 2005: Vila Nova
Medal record
Representing Brazil
Men's Football
Silver medal – second place	1984 Los Angeles	Team competition
- * Club domestic league appearances and goals

Mauro Geraldo Galvão (born 19 December 1961) is a Brazilian retired professional footballer who played as a defender. Galvão won the title of Campeonato Brasileiro Série A four times, playing for Internacional (1979), Grêmio (1996) and Vasco da Gama (1997 and 2000), along a span of 21 years; won the 1998 Copa Libertadores and lost the finals of the 1999 Intercontinental Cup and of the 2000 FIFA Club World Championship.

== Playing career ==
In his country Galvão played for Sport Club Internacional, Bangu Atlético Clube, Botafogo de Futebol e Regatas, Grêmio Foot-Ball Porto Alegrense (two spells) and CR Vasco da Gama. In 1990–91 he moved to FC Lugano in Switzerland, where he would remain for the following six seasons, winning the 1993 Swiss Cup after having reached the final of the competition the previous year.

After contributing rarely to Grêmio's fifth place in the 2001 Série A, also winning his second Brazilian Cup – the first was also conquered with that club, four years before – Galvão retired from football, at the age of 40.

He gained 24 caps for Brazil, his debut coming in 1986. After being an unused squad member at that year's FIFA World Cup, he was a starter under Sebastião Lazaroni in the 1990 FIFA World Cup in Italy, partnering Ricardo Gomes, Carlos Mozer and Ricardo Rocha – all four stoppers saw time during the tournament, Galvão played all four games, three complete – in a 5–3–2 formation, in an eventual round-of-16 exit.

Additionally Galvão helped the national team win the 1989 Copa América, also appearing in all the matches at the 1984 Summer Olympics tournament, which ended with silver medal conquest.

== Managerial career ==
In 2003 Galvão replaced Antônio Lopes as Vasco's head coach, starting his coaching career. He managed the club in 28 games, finally preventing its relegation to the Série B, after finishing 17th. The following year he was appointed at Botafogo taking Levir Culpi's place, but was himself fired before the end of the season.

In 2005 Galvão briefly managed Clube Náutico Capibaribe, coaching Vila Nova Futebol Clube in the same year.

== Honours ==
Internacional

- Campeonato Brasileiro Série A (1): 1979
- Campeonato Gaúcho (4): 1981, 1982, 1983, 1984
- Torneio Heleno Nunes: 1984

Botafogo

- Campeonato Carioca (2): 1989, 1990

Lugano

- Swiss Cup: 1992-93

Grêmio

- Campeonato Brasileiro Série A (1): 1996
- Copa do Brasil (2): 1997, 2001
- Campeonato Gaúcho (1): 2001

Vasco da Gama

- Campeonato Brasileiro Série A (2): 1997, 2000
- Campeonato Carioca (1): 1998
- Copa Libertadores (1): 1998
- Torneio Rio–São Paulo (1): 1999
- Copa Mercosur (1): 2000

Brazil national team

- Copa América (1): 1989
