= Gilberto (footballer, born 1976) =

Brazilian footballer

Personal information
- Full name: Gilberto da Silva Melo
- Date of birth: 25 April 1976 (age 50)
- Place of birth: Rio de Janeiro, Brazil
- Height: 1.79 m (5 ft 10 in)
- Positions: Left-back; left midfielder; central midfielder

Youth career
- –1994: America (RJ)
- 1996: Flamengo

Senior career*
Years	Team	Apps	(Gls)
1994–1995	America (RJ)	44	(4)
1996–1997	Flamengo	67	(2)
1998	Cruzeiro	25	(3)
1999	Internazionale	2	(0)
1999–2001	Vasco da Gama	40	(6)
2002–2003	Grêmio	54	(9)
2004	São Caetano	6	(0)
2004–2008	Hertha BSC	101	(14)
2008–2009	Tottenham Hotspur	7	(1)
2009–2011	Cruzeiro	44	(9)
2011	Vitória	10	(2)
2012–2013	América (MG)	18	(0)
2014	America (RJ)	0	(0)
2014	Araxá	0	(0)
Total		418	(50)

International career
2003–2010	Brazil	36	(1)
- * Club domestic league appearances and goals

Gilberto da Silva Melo (born 25 April 1976), more commonly known as Gilberto, is a Brazilian former professional footballer. He played at left-back for the majority of his career. Gilberto's brothers Nenei and Nélio are also former footballers.

== Club career ==
Born in Rio de Janeiro, Gilberto started his career in his native Brazil, playing for América-RJ, Flamengo and Cruzeiro. He moved for one season to Italian club Internazionale. However, he soon left for Vasco da Gama. He also played with Grêmio and São Caetano.

=== Hertha BSC ===
Gilberto returned to Europe in 2004 with Germany club Hertha BSC.

He played four years at this club. Gilberto combined a successful defense with permanent participation in the attacks from the left winger position. He had fast speed and good shot, and often threatened the goal, scoring six goals at the first season as a left back. In his first two seasons in Germany, Hertha finished fourth in the 2004–05 season and finished sixth in the following season.

=== Tottenham Hotspur ===
Gilberto signed for Tottenham Hotspur from Hertha on 31 January 2008. After an initial period out injured, he made his Spurs debut against PSV in the UEFA Cup on 6 March 2008, but was replaced by Jamie O'Hara at half-time, after he had made a mistake that allowed PSV to score the game's only goal. Spurs manager Juande Ramos stated after the match that Gilberto was substituted not because of the error, but rather because he is still recovering from his calf injury. Nevertheless, in playing, he became the first Brazilian to play for Spurs at first-team level, with their previous Brazilian players Rodrigo Defendi and Diego Bortolozzo only featuring in the reserve team. In Spurs' next game, Gilberto came on as a substitute to score the team's third goal in a 4–0 win over West Ham United in the Premier League. Gilberto played his first full Spurs match against Bolton Wanderers at White Hart Lane on 26 April 2008.

Gilberto only made three appearances for Spurs in the 2008–09 season. He started a league game against Portsmouth and a UEFA Cup tie with Spartak Moscow. He was substituted at half time in both games. His last appearance for Spurs came against Shakhtar Donetsk in the UEFA Cup on 26 February 2009.

=== Cruzeiro ===
On 17 July 2009, Brazilian club Cruzeiro announced Gilberto will sign a two-year contract after a medical. Tottenham Hotspur announced his contract was mutually terminated on 24 July. He was unveiled to press on 29 July after the medical on the same day.

He confirmed that he had quit the team during the season after ongoing discord among fans and the other squad members, and the club terminated his contract on 20 September 2011.

=== Vitoria ===
On 26 September 2011, Gilberto signed for the Campeonato Brasileiro Série B side Esporte Clube Vitória until the end of the season.

== International career ==
In 1998 was the first time that Gilberto had training with the national team, after a successful season. He played for Brazil in the 2006 FIFA World Cup in Germany and scored against Japan in the group stage, his first goal for the national side, having made his debut for the team against Nigeria on 11 June 2003. Gilberto also featured as Brazil's first choice left back in the Copa America 2007. Due to club performance, he lost his place on the national team to Kléber, and then to André Santos, which both of them selected to 2009 FIFA Confederations Cup and left Gilberto out. However, he has been called up in February 2010 to a friendly match against Republic of Ireland since returned to Brazil. But he played as unused bench as Michel Bastos's backup.

Moreover, most of the 22-men squad for the Ireland match (except Adriano and Carlos Eduardo), plus Elano, Luís Fabiano (who both pull out from the friendly by injury) and Heurelho Gomes, became the provisional 23-men squad for the 2010 FIFA World Cup. And 7 more players were call-up as backup players. He played twice for the Seleção at the tournament, both as sub, including the match losing to the Netherlands in the quarter-finals. After the dismiss of Dunga, he never received any call-up again, and one year later, in 2011 he retired from the international football.

== Career statistics ==
=== International ===
Appearances and goals by national team and year
National team	Year	Apps	Goals
Brazil	2003	2	0
Brazil	2005	7	0
Brazil	2006	6	1
Brazil	2007	15	0
Brazil	2008	4	0
Brazil	2010	2	0
Total		36	1

Score and result list Brazil's goal tally first, score column indicates score after Gilberto goal.

International goal scored by Gilberto
No.	Date	Venue	Opponent	Score	Result	Competition
1	22 June 2006	FIFA World Cup Stadium Dortmund, Dortmund, Germany	Japan	3–1	4–1	2006 FIFA World Cup

== Honours ==
Flamengo

- Campeonato Carioca: 1996
- Copa de Oro: 1996

Cruzeiro

- Minas Gerais State Championship: 1998, 2011

Vasco da Gama

- Campeonato Brasileiro Série A: 2000
- Copa Mercosur: 2000

São Caetano

- Campeonato Paulista: 2004

Brazil

- FIFA Confederations Cup: 2005
- Copa América: 2007
- Lunar New Year Cup: 2005
