= Odvan =

Brazilian footballer (born 1974)

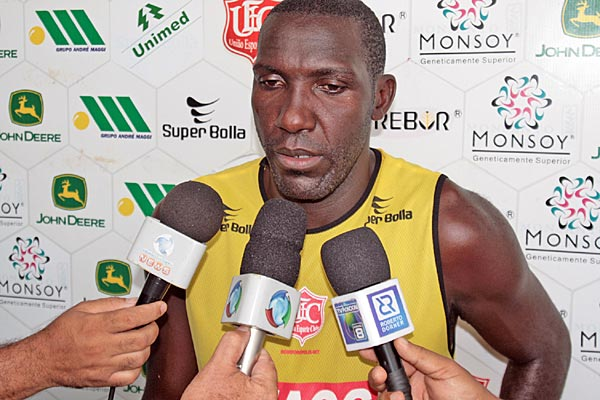

Personal information
- Full name: Odvan Gomes da Silva
- Date of birth: 26 March 1974 (age 52)
- Place of birth: Campos dos Goytacazes, Brazil
- Height: 1.82 m (6 ft 0 in)
- Position: Defender

Senior career*
Years	Team	Apps	(Gls)
1993–1997	Americano		
1995	→ Mineiros (loan)		
1996	→ Mimosense (loan)		
1997–2001	Vasco da Gama	96	(1)
2002	Santos		
2002	Botafogo	22	(1)
2003	Coritiba	26	(1)
2004	Fluminense	32	(0)
2005	D.C. United	0	(0)
2005	Náutico		
2005	Estrela da Amadora	0	(0)
2006	Madureira		
2006	Bangu		
2007	Madureira		
2007	Rio Bananal		
2007	Ituano	7	(1)
2008	Madureira		
2008	Cabofriense		
2008	Vasco da Gama	7	(0)
2009	União de Rondonópolis		
2010	CTAZ		
2011	São João da Barra		
2012	Goytacaz		
2013	ADR São José		
Total		190+	(4+)

International career
1998–1999	Brazil	12	(0)
- * Club domestic league appearances and goals

Odvan Gomes da Silva (born 26 March 1974) is a Brazilian former professional footballer who played as a defender.

== Career ==
Born in Campos dos Goytacazes, Odvan played for Americano, Mineiros, Mimosense, Vasco da Gama, Santos, Botafogo, Coritiba, Fluminense, D.C. United, Náutico, Estrela da Amadora, Madureira, Bangu, Rio Bananal, Ituano, Cabofriense, União de Rondonópolis, CTAZ, São João da Barra, Goytacaz and ADR São José.

He earned 12 caps for the Brazil national team, with whom he won the 1999 Copa América.
