= 1999 Torneio Rio-São Paulo =

Torneio Rio-São Paulo
- Season: 1999
- Champions: Vasco da Gama (3rd title)
- Matches played: 29
- Goals scored: 99 (3.41 per match)
- Top goalscorer: Alessandro (Santos); Bebeto (Botafogo); Guilherme (Vasco da Gama) – 5 goals each
- Biggest home win: Botafogo 6–1 Corinthians (Jan 24)
- Biggest away win: Palmeiras 1–5 Vasco da Gama (Jan 24)

The 1999 Torneio Rio São Paulo was the 23rd edition of the Torneio Rio-São Paulo. It was disputed between 23 January to 3 March 1999.

== Participants ==
Team	City	Ground	Nº participations	Best result
Botafogo	(Rio de Janeiro (state)) Rio de Janeiro	Maracanã	20	Champions: 1962, 1964 (shared), 1966 (shared), 1998
Corinthians	(São Paulo (state)) São Paulo	Pacaembu	23	Champions: 1950, 1953, 1954, 1966 (shared)
Flamengo	(Rio de Janeiro (state)) Rio de Janeiro	Maracanã	22	Champions: 1961
Fluminense	(Rio de Janeiro (state)) Rio de Janeiro	Maracanã	22	Champions: 1957, 1960
Palmeiras	(São Paulo (state)) São Paulo	Parque Antártica	23	Champions: 1933, 1951, 1965, 1993
Santos	(São Paulo (state)) Santos	Vila Belmiro	19	Champions: 1959, 1963, 1964 (shared), 1966 (shared), 1997
São Paulo	(São Paulo (state)) São Paulo	Morumbi	22	Runners-up: 1933, 1962, 1998
Vasco da Gama	(Rio de Janeiro (state)) Rio de Janeiro	São Januário	23	Champions: 1958, 1966 (shared)

== Format ==
The clubs were separated in two groups: Group A and Group B, playing a double round-robin in each group, with the two best clubs advanced to semifinals. The winners of semifinals, advanced to the finals.

== Tournament ==
Following is the summary of the 1999 Torneio Rio-São Paulo tournament:

=== Group A ===
Pos	Team	Pld	W	D	L	GF	GA	GD	Pts	Qualification
1	(São Paulo (state)) Santos	6	3	1	2	13	8	+5	10	Qualified to semifinals
2	(Rio de Janeiro (state)) Vasco da Gama	5	3	1	1	12	7	+5	10	Qualified to semifinals
3	(Rio de Janeiro (state)) Fluminense	5	2	0	3	10	10	0	6	
4	(São Paulo (state)) Palmeiras	6	2	0	4	7	17	−10	6	

Source: RSSSF
Rules for classification: 1) points; 2) wins; 3) goal difference; 4) goals for.

Note: The match Fluminense vs. Vasco da Gama it was not held because the clubs could not reach an agreement on the stadium where the match would take place.

=== Group B ===
Pos	Team	Pld	W	D	L	GF	GA	GD	Pts	Qualification
1	(São Paulo (state)) São Paulo	6	4	1	1	8	4	+4	13	Qualified to semifinals
2	(Rio de Janeiro (state)) Botafogo	6	2	2	2	15	12	+3	8	Qualified to semifinals
3	(Rio de Janeiro (state)) Flamengo	6	2	2	2	10	7	+3	8	
4	(São Paulo (state)) Corinthians	6	1	1	4	6	16	−10	4	

Source: RSSSF
Rules for classification: 1) points; 2) wins; 3) goal difference; 4) goals for.

=== Semifinals ===
Team 1	Agg.	Team 2	1st leg	2nd leg
Santos	3–0	Botafogo	1–0	2–0
São Paulo	4–5	Vasco da Gama	3–2	1–3

=== Finals ===
28 February 1999

Vasco da Gama (Rio de Janeiro (state))	3–1	(São Paulo (state)) Santos
Mauro Galvão 16'; Juninho Pernambucano 65'; Zezinho 71'		Alessandro 20'

Maracanã, Rio de Janeiro
Attendance: 81,421
Referee: Paulo César de Oliveira

3 March 1999

Santos (São Paulo (state))	1–2	(Rio de Janeiro (state)) Vasco da Gama
Alessandro 46'		Zé Maria 45+1'; Juninho Pernambucano 74'

Morumbi, São Paulo
Attendance: 32,495
Referee: Cláudio Vinícius Cerdeira

== Top scorers ==
Rank	Player	Club	Goals
1	Alessandro	Santos	5
1	Bebeto	Botafogo	5
1	Guilherme	Vasco da Gama	5
4	Juninho Pernambucano	Vasco da Gama	4
4	Marcos Assunção	Santos	4
4	Serginho	São Paulo	4
