= 2000 Copa Mercosur =

Tournament details
- Dates: 1 August – 20 December 2000
- Teams: 20 (from 5 associations)

Final positions
- Champions: (Brazil) Vasco da Gama (1st title)
- Runners-up: (Brazil) Palmeiras

Tournament statistics
- Matches played: 75
- Goals scored: 239 (3.19 per match)
- Top scorer: (Brazil) Romário (11 goals)

The 2000 Copa Mercosur was the 3rd season of the Copa Mercosur, CONMEBOL's club tournament for countries in the southern part of America.

The competition started on 1 August 2000 and concluded on 20 December 2000 with Vasco da Gama beating Palmeiras in the final for its first title.

Romario was the top scorer with 11 goals.

== Participants ==
Country	Team
Argentina (6 berths)	Boca Juniors
Argentina (6 berths)	Independiente
Argentina (6 berths)	River Plate
Argentina (6 berths)	Rosario Central
Argentina (6 berths)	San Lorenzo
Argentina (6 berths)	Vélez Sársfield
Brazil (7 berths)	Atlético Mineiro
Brazil (7 berths)	Corinthians
Brazil (7 berths)	Cruzeiro
Brazil (7 berths)	Flamengo
Brazil (7 berths)	Palmeiras
Brazil (7 berths)	São Paulo
Brazil (7 berths)	Vasco da Gama
Chile (3 berths)	Colo-Colo
Chile (3 berths)	Universidad Católica
Chile (3 berths)	Universidad de Chile
Paraguay (2 berths)	Cerro Porteño
Paraguay (2 berths)	Olimpia
Uruguay (2 berths)	Nacional
Uruguay (2 berths)	Peñarol

== Details ==
- The 20 teams were divided into 5 groups of 4 teams. Each team plays the other teams in the group twice. The top team from each group qualified for the quarter-finals along with the best 3 runners up.
- From the quarter finals to the final, two legs were played in each round. In the result of a draw, the match was decided by a penalty shoot out.

== Group stage ==
=== Group A ===
Pos	Team	Pld	W	D	L	GF	GA	GD	Pts	Qualification	(Argentina) RIV	(Brazil) FLA	(Argentina) VEL	(Chile) UC
1	(Argentina) River Plate	6	4	2	0	10	5	+5	14	Advance to Quarter-finals	—	0–0	2–1	2–0
2	(Brazil) Flamengo	6	3	2	1	10	3	+7	11	Advance to Quarter-finals	1–2	—	2–0	2–0
3	(Argentina) Vélez Sársfield	6	1	3	2	7	8	−1	6		1–1	1–1	—	3–1
4	Universidad de Chile	6	0	1	5	4	15	−11	1		2–3	0–4	1–1	—

=== Group B ===
Pos	Team	Pld	W	D	L	GF	GA	GD	Pts	Qualification	(Brazil) CRU	(Brazil) PAL	(Argentina) IND	(Chile) CAT
1	(Brazil) Cruzeiro	6	4	1	1	12	4	+8	13	Advance to Quarter-finals	—	0–0	3–0	4–0
2	(Brazil) Palmeiras	6	3	2	1	8	5	+3	11	Advance to Quarter-finals	0–2	—	2–0	1–1
3	(Argentina) Independiente	6	2	1	3	9	10	−1	7		2–0	1–2	—	3–0
4	(Chile) Universidad Católica	6	0	2	4	7	17	−10	2		2–3	1–3	3–3	—

=== Group C ===
Pos	Team	Pld	W	D	L	GF	GA	GD	Pts	Qualification	(Argentina) ROS	(Brazil) SAO	(Paraguay) CER	(Chile) COL
1	(Argentina) Rosario Central	6	4	1	1	9	4	+5	13	Advance to Quarter-finals	—	2–1	2–1	0–0
2	(Brazil) São Paulo	6	2	1	3	13	13	0	7		1–0	—	4–4	4–0
3	(Paraguay) Cerro Porteño	6	2	1	3	13	15	−2	7		1–4	4–2	—	2–1
4	(Chile) Colo Colo	6	2	1	3	6	9	−3	7		0–1	3–1	2–1	—

=== Group D ===
Pos	Team	Pld	W	D	L	GF	GA	GD	Pts	Qualification	(Argentina) BOC	(Uruguay) NAC	(Paraguay) OLI	(Brazil) COR
1	(Argentina) Boca Juniors	6	3	3	0	15	8	+7	12	Advance to Quarter-finals	—	1–1	5–2	3–0
2	(Uruguay) Nacional	6	2	3	1	8	8	0	9		3–3	—	1–0	1–1
3	(Paraguay) Olimpia	6	3	0	3	9	10	−1	9		0–1	4–3	—	3–2
4	(Brazil) Corinthians	6	0	2	4	7	13	−6	2		2–2	1–2	1–2	—

=== Group E ===
Pos	Team	Pld	W	D	L	GF	GA	GD	Pts	Qualification	(Brazil) MIN	(Brazil) VAS	(Uruguay) PEÑ	(Argentina) SAN
1	(Brazil) Atlético Mineiro	6	4	1	1	13	10	+3	13	Advance to Quarter-finals	—	2–0	2–1	3–2
2	(Brazil) Vasco da Gama	6	3	1	2	11	7	+4	10	Advance to Quarter-finals	2–0	—	1–1	3–0
3	(Uruguay) Peñarol	6	2	2	2	11	11	0	8		2–2	4–3	—	3–2
4	(Argentina) San Lorenzo	6	1	0	5	8	15	−7	3		3–4	0–2	1–0	—

== Quarter-finals ==
=== First leg ===
31 October 2000

Flamengo (Brazil)	1–2	(Argentina) River Plate
Juan 66'		51' Saviola; 81' Ortega

31 October 2000

Vasco da Gama (Brazil)	1–0	(Argentina) Rosario Central
Juninho Paulista 19'

1 November 2000

Palmeiras (Brazil)	3–2	(Brazil) Cruzeiro
Juninho 1'; Tuta 37'; Magrão 67'		72' Giovanni; 79' Sorín

1 November 2000

Atlético Mineiro (Brazil)	2–0	(Argentina) Boca Juniors
Marques 45'; Capria 81'

=== Second leg ===
8 November 2000

River Plate (Argentina)	4–3	(Brazil) Flamengo
Saviola 53'; Aimar 83'; Cardetti 87'; Ortega 90'		46' Edílson; 64' Juan; 84' Petković

River Plate won 6–4 on aggregate.

8 November 2000

Rosario Central (Argentina)	1–0	(Brazil) Vasco da Gama
Díaz 90'

1–1 on aggregate, Vasco da Gama won 5–4 on penalties.

8 November 2000

Cruzeiro (Brazil)	1–2	(Brazil) Palmeiras
Sérgio Manoel 90' (pen.)		Galeano 15'; Arce 89' (pen.)

Palmeiras won 5–3 on aggregate.

7 November 2000

Boca Juniors (Argentina)	2–2	(Brazil) Atlético Mineiro
Barijho 10', 42'		38' Cláudio Caçapa; 90' André Neles

Atlético Mineiro won 4–2 on aggregate.

== Semi-finals ==
=== First leg ===
22 November 2000
9:40 PM

River Plate (Argentina)	1–4	(Brazil) Vasco da Gama
Cardetti 71'		22' Romário; 32' Júnior Baiano; 51'Juninho Paulista; 65'Pedrinho

22 November 2000
10:15 PM

Palmeiras (Brazil)	4–1	(Brazil) Atlético Mineiro
Tuta 1', 43'; Paulo Turra 3'; Basílio 78'		64' (pen.) Cláudio Caçapa

=== Second leg ===
28 November 2000

Atlético Mineiro (Brazil)	0–2	(Brazil) Palmeiras
		46' Tuta; 87' Juninho

Palmeiras won 6–1 on aggregate.

30 November 2000

Vasco da Gama (Brazil)	1–0	(Argentina) River Plate
Juninho Paulista 46'

Vasco da Gama won 5–1 on aggregate.

== Final ==
=== First leg ===
6 December 2000

Vasco da Gama (Brazil)	2–0	(Brazil) Palmeiras
Juninho Pernambucano 45'; Romário 77'

Estádio São Januário, Rio de Janeiro
Attendance: 25,000
Referee: Márcio Rezende de Freitas (Brazil)

=== Second leg ===
12 December 2000

Palmeiras (Brazil)	1–0	(Brazil) Vasco da Gama
Neném 21'

Parque Antárctica, São Paulo
Attendance: 20,000
Referee: Oscar Roberto Godói (Brazil)

Since Vasco won the first leg and Palmeiras won the second leg, a third leg had to be played.

=== Final ===
20 December 2000
9:45 PM

Palmeiras (Brazil)	3–4	(Brazil) Vasco da Gama
Arce 36' (pen.); Magrão 37'; Tuta 45+1'		59' (pen.), 69' (pen.), 93' Romário; 86' Juninho Paulista

Parque Antárctica, São Paulo
Attendance: 30,000
Referee: Márcio Rezende de Freitas (Brazil)

2000 Copa Mercosur Winner

Vasco da Gama
First Title
