= Copa João Havelange =

Campeonato Brasileiro Série A
- Season: 2000
- Champions: Vasco da Gama (4th title)
- Copa Libertadores: Vasco da Gama; São Caetano; Cruzeiro (via Copa do Brasil); Palmeiras (via Copa dos Campeões)
- Matches: 1,066
- Goals: 2,970 (2.79 per match)
- Top goalscorer: Adhemar (22 goals)
- Biggest home win: Ponte Preta 5–1 Palmeiras; Cruzeiro 5–1 Portuguesa ^{b}
- Biggest away win: Atlético Mineiro 0–6 Sport
- Average attendance: 11,546^{a}

The 2000 Campeonato Brasileiro Série A (officially the Copa João Havelange) was the 44th edition of the Campeonato Brasileiro Série A, the top-level of professional football in Brazil. Due to legal complications, the championship was organized by Clube dos 13 instead of CBF, and was contested by 116 teams divided in modules, equivalent to their division—similar to the 1987 Copa União. It started on July 29 and ended on January 18, 2001, with Vasco da Gama winning the championship—its fourth title. The name of the championship was an homage to former CBF and FIFA president João Havelange.

== Background ==
The formula of relegation of the 1999 Brasileirão was based on the average points between 1998 and 1999. But due to a decision of the Supreme Court of Sporting Justice (STJD) of removing points from São Paulo, who played against Botafogo and Internacional with an irregular player, Brasília team SE Gama was going to dispute Série B instead of Botafogo. Gama refused the relegation and, supported by the Distrito Federal Football Coaches Trade Union and political party PFL, sued CBF requesting a return to Série A. By June 2000, the trial was not solved, and CBF could not release the 2000 Brasileirão rules.

A deal with Clube dos 13 allowed it to organize a championship, which CBF would later ratify. To avoid further legal problems, the championship would encompass all divisions. The module equivalent to the top division would have the 18 teams which escaped relegation in 1999, the two teams promoted by 1999 Série B, and five teams which would contest Série B in 2000 (Série C champion Fluminense, Clube dos 13 member Bahia, Juventude, América-MG and Gama, who removed the lawsuit against CBF and was allowed by FIFA to participate).

== Controversies ==
The end of competition was marked by disaster, when a crowd crush during the second leg of the final at São Januário stadium caused a fence to collapse, injuring more than 150 fans and forcing the game to be abandoned and later rescheduled.

== Knockout stage ==
=== Bracket ===
Round of sixteen
1	Cruzeiro (MG)	3	1	4
16	Malutrom (PR)	0	1	1
8	Atlético (PR)	0	1	1
9	Internacional (RS)	0	2	2
4	Goiás (GO)	1	0	1
13	Paraná (PR)	1	3	4
5	Vasco da Gama (RJ)	3	3	6
12	Bahia (BA)	3	2	5
2	Sport (PE)	2	1	3
15	Remo (PA)	1	0	1
7	Ponte Preta (SP)	0	2	2
10	Grêmio (RS)	1	1	2
3	Fluminense (RJ)	3	0	3
14	São Caetano (SP)	3	1	4
6	São Paulo (SP)	1	1	2
11	Palmeiras (SP)	1	2	3

Quarter-finals
1	Cruzeiro (MG)	1	3	4
9	Internacional (RS)	1	2	3
13	Paraná (PR)	1	1	2
5	Vasco da Gama (RJ)	3	0	3
2	Sport (PE)	1	1	2
10	Grêmio (RS)	2	1	3
14	São Caetano (SP)	4	2	6
11	Palmeiras (SP)	3	2	5

Semi-finals
1	Cruzeiro (MG)	2	1	3
5	Vasco da Gama (RJ)	2	3	5
10	Grêmio (RS)	2	1	3
14	São Caetano (SP)	3	3	6

Final
5	Vasco da Gama (RJ)	1	3	4
14	São Caetano (SP)	1	1	2

=== Round of sixteen ===
Team 1	Agg.	Team 2	1st leg	2nd leg
Internacional (RS)	2–1	Atlético (PR)	0–0	2-1
Remo (PA)	1–3	Sport (PE)	1–2	0–1
Paraná (PR)	4–1	Goiás (GO)	1–1	3–0
São Caetano (SP)	4–3	Fluminense (RJ)	3–3	1–0
Malutrom (PR)	1–4	Cruzeiro (MG)	0–3	1–1
Grêmio (RS)	2–2	Ponte Preta (SP)	1–0	1–2
Bahia (BA)	5–6	Vasco da Gama (RJ)	3–3	2–3
Palmeiras (SP)	3–2	São Paulo (SP)	1–1	2–1

=== Quarter-finals ===
Team 1	Agg.	Team 2	1st leg	2nd leg
Internacional (RS)	3–4	Cruzeiro (MG)	1–1	2–3
Grêmio (RS)	3–2	Sport (PE)	2–1	1–1
Vasco da Gama (RJ)	3–2	Paraná (PR)	3–1	0–1
Palmeiras (SP)	5–6	São Caetano (SP)	3–4	2–2

=== Semi-finals ===
Team 1	Agg.	Team 2	1st leg	2nd leg
São Caetano (SP)	6–3	Grêmio (RS)	3–2	3–1
Vasco da Gama (RJ)	5–3	Cruzeiro (MG)	2–2	3–1

=== Final ===
Team 1	Agg.	Team 2	1st leg	2nd leg
São Caetano (SP)	2–4	Vasco da Gama (RJ)	1–1	1–3

== Final standings ==
Pos	Club	Final result (National - Group ranked)	Qualification
1	Vasco da Gama	Champion - Group Blue 8th place	Copa Libertadores 2001
2	São Caetano	Runner-up - Group Yellow Runner-up	Copa Libertadores 2001
3	Cruzeiro	Semi-finalist - Group Blue 1st place	Copa Libertadores 2001^{1}
4	Grêmio	Semi-finalist - Group Blue 10th place	Série A
5	Paraná	Quarter-finalist - Group Yellow Winner	Série A
6	Palmeiras	Quarter-finalist - Group Blue 11th place	Copa Libertadores 2001^{2}
7	Internacional	Quarter-finalist - Group Blue 9th place	Série A
8	Sport	Quarter-finalist - Group Blue 2nd place	Série A
9	Ponte Preta	Eighth-finalist - Group Blue 7th place	Série A
10	Fluminense	Eighth-finalist - Group Blue 3rd place	Série A
11	Bahia	Eighth-finalist - Group Blue 12th place	Série A
12	São Paulo	Eighth-finalist - Group Blue 6th place	Série A
13	Atlético Paranaense	Eighth-finalist - Group Blue 8th place	Série A
14	Goiás	Eighth-finalist - Group Blue 4th place	Série A
15	Malutrom	Eighth-finalist - Group Yellow Third-place	Série B
16	Remo	Eighth-finalist - Group Green & White Winner	Série B
17	Guarani	Group Blue 13th place	Série A
18	Santos	Group Blue 14th place	Série A
19	Flamengo	Group Blue 15th place	Série A
20	Botafogo	Group Blue 16th place	Série A
21	Portuguesa	Group Blue 17th place	Série A
22	Vitória	Group Blue 18th place	Série A
23	América Mineiro	Group Blue 19th place	Série A
24	Atlético Mineiro	Group Blue 20th place	Série A
25	Juventude	Group Blue 21st place	Série A
26	Gama	Group Blue 22nd place	Série A
27	Coritiba	Group Blue 23rd place	Série A
28	Corinthians	Group Blue 24th place	Série A
29	Santa Cruz	Group Blue 25th place	Série A
30	Paysandu	Group Yellow Fourth-place	Série B
31	Caxias	Group Yellow Quarter-finalist	Série B
32	Náutico	Group Yellow Quarter-finalist	Série B
33	Fortaleza	Group Yellow Quarter-finalist	Série B
34	Bangu	Group Yellow Quarter-finalist	
35	Figueirense	Group Yellow Eighth-finalist	Série B
36	Botafogo-SP	Group Yellow Eighth-finalist	Série A^{3}
37	Avaí	Group Yellow Eighth-finalist	Série B
38	São Raimundo (AM)	Group Yellow Eighth-finalist	Série B
39	Criciúma	Group Yellow Eighth-finalist	Série B
40	Sampaio Corrêa	Group Yellow Eighth-finalist	Série B
41	CRB	Group Yellow Eighth-finalist	Série B
42	Anapolina	Group Yellow Eighth-finalist	Série B
43	Serra	Group Yellow 9th place	Série B
44	ABC	Group Yellow 10th place	Série B
45	River	Group Yellow 11th place	
46	Joinville	Group Yellow 9th place	Série B
47	América-RN	Group Yellow 12th place	Série B
48	Ceará	Group Yellow 13th place	Série B
49	América-RJ	Group Yellow 10th place	
50	CSA	Group Yellow 14th place	
51	Americano	Group Yellow 11th place	Série B
52	União São João	Group Yellow 12th place	Série B
53	Nacional-AM	Group Yellow 15th place	Série B
54	XV de Piracicaba	Group Yellow 13th place	Série B
55	Marcílio Dias	Group Yellow 14th place	
56	Bragantino	Group Yellow 15th place	Série B
57	Desportiva	Group Yellow 16th place	Série B
58	Brasil de Pelotas	Group Yellow 16th place	
59	Villa Nova-MG	Group Yellow 17th place	
60	Vila Nova-GO	Group Yellow 17th place	Série B
61	Londrina	Group Yellow 18th place	Série B
62	Bandeirante	Group Yellow 18th place	
63	Uberlândia	Group Green & White Runner-up	
64	Etti Jundiaí	Group Green & White Third-round 3rd place	
65	Tuna Luso	Group Green & White Third-round 2nd place	
66	Juazeiro-CE	Group Green & White Third-round 2nd place	
67	Olímpia	Group Green & White Third-round 3rd place	
68	Central	Group Green & White Third-round 4th place	
69	Moto Club	Group Green & White Third-round 4th place	
70	Corinthians-AL	Group Green Second-round 3rd place	
71	Rio Branco-PR	Group White Second-round 3rd place	
72	Rio Branco-SP	Group White Second-round 2nd place	
73	Flamengo-PI	Group Green Second-round 3rd place	
74	Ypiranga-AP	Group Green Second-round 3rd place	
75	Juventus	Group White Second-round 3rd place	
76	Tocantinópolis	Group Green Second-round 2nd place	
77	Portuguesa Santista	Group White Second-round 2nd place	
78	Confiança	Group Green Second-round 4th place	
79	Operário (MS)	Group Green Second-round 2nd place	
80	Friburguense	Group White Second-round 3rd place	
81	Matonense	Group White Second-round 4th place	
82	Dom Pedro II	Group Green Second-round 4th place	
83	Atlético-GO	Group Green Second-round 4th place	
84	União Bandeirante	Group White Second-round 4th place	
85	Santo André	Group White Second-round 4th place	
86	Rio Branco-AC	Group Green First-round	
87	Baré	Group Green First-round	
88	Botafogo-PB	Group Green First-round	
89	Sergipe	Group Green First-round	
90	Rio Negro	Group Green First-round	
91	Porto	Group Green First-round	
92	Treze	Group Green First-round	
93	São Cristóvão	Group White First-round	
94	Mogi Mirim	Group White First-round	
95	ASA	Group Green First-round	
96	Madureira	Group White First-round	
97	Nacional-SP	Group White First-round	
98	Internacional-SP	Group White First-round	
99	Goiânia	Group Green First-round	
100	Ipatinga	Group White First-round	
101	Camaçari	Group Green First-round	
102	Ituano	Group White First-round	
103	Comercial-MS	Group Green First-round	
103	Olaria	Group White First-round	
105	Brasília	Group Green First-round	
106	União	Group White First-round	
107	Comercial-SP	Group White First-round	
108	Volta Redonda	Group White First-round	
109	União Barbarense	Group White First-round	
110	Inter de Santa Maria	Group White First-round	
111	Genus	Group Green First-round	
112	Potiguar	Group Green First-round	
113	Campinense	Group Green First-round	
114	São José-SP	Group White First-round	
115	Interporto	Not played	
115	Rio Branco-ES	Not played	

Team ranked by round advanced. For teams that advanced to the same round, combined result separate the tie.

All teams qualified to Copa Libertadores also qualified to Serie A

^{1} As Copa do Brasil winner
^{2}As Copa dos Campeões winner
^{3}As a member of Série A 1999
