= 1998 CR Vasco da Gama season =

Vasco da Gama
1998 season
- Chairman: Antônio Soares Calçada
- Manager: Antônio Lopes
- Stadium: São Januário; Maracanã
- Campeonato Brasileiro Série A: League stage: 10th
- Copa do Brasil: Semifinals
- Campeonato Carioca: Champions; Taça Guanabara: Champions; Taça Rio de Janeiro: Champions
- Copa Libertadores: Champions
- Intercontinental Cup: Runners-up
- Copa Interamericana: Runners-up
- Copa Mercosur: Group stage
- Torneio Rio–São Paulo: Group stage
- Top goalscorer: Ramon (10)
Home colours	Away colours

The 1998 season was Club de Regatas Vasco da Gama 100th year in existence, the club's 83rd season in existence of football, and the club's 28th season playing in the Campeonato Brasileiro Série A, the top flight of Brazilian football.

Vasco de Gama finished 10th in the league table.

== Pre-season and friendlies ==
11 June 1998	Itumbiara squad	v	Vasco da Gama	Itumbiara

== Competitions ==
Times from 1 January to 14 February 1998 and from 11 October to 31 December 1998 are UTC–2, from 15 February 1998 to 10 October 1998 UTC–3.

=== Campeonato Brasileiro Série A ===
==== League stage ====
===== League table =====
Pos	Team	Pld	W	D	L	GF	GA	GD	Pts	Qualification or relegation
8	Grêmio	23	10	6	7	32	30	+2	36	Qualified to Quarterfinals
9	Atlético Mineiro	23	9	9	5	38	33	+5	36	
10	Vasco da Gama	23	9	7	7	34	24	+10	34	
11	Flamengo	23	9	6	8	37	34	+3	33	
12	Internacional	23	9	5	9	25	25	0	32	

===== Results summary =====
Overall								Home						Away					
Pld	W	D	L	GF	GA	GD	Pts	W	D	L	GF	GA	GD	W	D	L	GF	GA	GD
0	0	0	0	0	0	0	0	0	0	0	0	0	0	0	0	0	0	0	0

Last updated: 12 November 1998.

===== Matches =====
25 July 1998 I	Vasco da Gama	0 – 1	Corinthians	Rio de Janeiro
			60' Marcelinho Carioca	Stadium: Estádio Mário Filho (Maracanã)

2 August 1998 II	Bragantino	0 – 0	Vasco da Gama	Bragança Paulista
				Stadium: Estádio Marcelo Stéfani (Marcelão)

5 August 1998 III	Vasco da Gama	5 – 1	América (MG)	Rio de Janeiro
	Luizão 29', 50', 63'; Pedrinho 19'; Juninho 57'		82' Irênio	Stadium: Estádio Vasco da Gama (São Januário)

7 November 1998 IV	Palmeiras	2 – 1	Vasco da Gama	São Paulo
	Alex 41', 46'		20' Luizão	Stadium: Estádio Palestra Itália (Parque Antarctica)

2 September 1998 V	Vasco da Gama	1 – 2	Portuguesa	Rio de Janeiro
	Juninho 68'		3' Alexandre; 65' Leandro Amaral	Stadium: Estádio Vasco da Gama (São Januário)

16 August 1998 VI	Vasco da Gama	2 – 1	Guarani	Rio de Janeiro
	Sorlei 26' (o.g.); Pedrinho 56'		35' Robson Ponte	Stadium: Estádio Vasco da Gama (São Januário)

15 September 1998 VII	Atlético Mineiro	1 – 1	Vasco da Gama	Belo Horizonte
	Edmílson 72'		54' Ramon	Stadium: Estádio Governador Magalhães Pinto (Mineirão)

4 November 1998 VIII	Vasco da Gama	2 – 1	Grêmio	Rio de Janeiro
	Dedé 74'; Mauro Galvão 84'		18' Luís Carlos Goiano	Stadium: Estádio Vasco da Gama (São Januário)

30 August 1998 IX	Flamengo	1 – 1	Vasco da Gama	Rio de Janeiro
	Beto 24'		39' Ramon	Stadium: Estádio Mário Filho (Maracanã)

6 September 1998 X	Vasco da Gama	2 – 0	Cruzeiro	Rio de Janeiro
	Sorato 45'; Nélson 90'			Stadium: Estádio Vasco da Gama (São Januário)

9 September 1998 XI	Vasco da Gama	0 – 0	Sport do Recife	Rio de Janeiro
				Stadium: Estádio Vasco da Gama (São Januário)

12 September 1998 XII	São Paulo	1 – 1	Vasco da Gama	São Paulo
	Souza 61'		90+1' Ramon	Stadium: Estádio Cícero Pompeu de Toledo (Morumbi)

19 September 1998 XIII	Paraná	2 – 1	Vasco da Gama	Curitiba
	Arinélson 16'; Hélcio 90+1'		86' Ramon	Stadium: Estádio Durival Britto e Silva (Vila Capanema)

24 September 1998 XIV	Vasco da Gama	1 – 1	Juventude	Rio de Janeiro
	Luiz Cláudio 23'		86' Rodrigo Gral	Stadium: Estádio Vasco da Gama (São Januário)

27 September 1998 XV	Vasco da Gama	2 – 0	Botafogo	Rio de Janeiro
	Ramon 22', 62'			Stadium: Estádio Mário Filho (Maracanã)

3 October 1998 XVI	América (Natal)	1 – 3	Vasco da Gama	Natal, Rio Grande do Norte
	Zezinho 31'		20', 40' Luizão; 66' Ramon	Stadium: Estádio Dr. João Cláudio Vasconcelos Machado (Machadão)

7 October 1998 XVII	Ponte Preta	2 – 1	Vasco da Gama	Campinas
	Mineiro 21'; Dionísio 65'		9' Luizão	Stadium: Estádio Moisés Lucarelli (Majestoso)

11 October 1998 XVIII	Vasco da Gama	3 – 1	Santos	Rio de Janeiro
	Ramon 17'; Juninho 30'; Felipe 81'		68' Messias	Stadium: Estádio Vasco da Gama (São Januário)

18 October 1998 XIX	Internacional	1 – 0	Vasco da Gama	Porto Alegre
	Christian 33'			Stadium: Estádio José Pinheiro Borda (Beira-Rio)

21 October 1998 XX	Atlético Paranaense	1 – 2	Vasco da Gama	Curitiba
	Alex Oliveira 56'		12' Henrique; 90+5' Donizete	Stadium: Estádio Durival Britto e Silva (Vila Capanema)

24 October 1998 XXI	Vasco da Gama	0 – 1	Vitória	Rio de Janeiro
			78' Petković	Stadium: Estádio Vasco da Gama (São Januário)

29 October 1998 XXII	Vasco da Gama	3 – 1	Coritiba	Rio de Janeiro
	Mauro Galvão 2'; Ramon 83', 87'		48' Brandão	Stadium: Estádio Vasco da Gama (São Januário)

12 November 1998 XXIII	Goiás	2 – 2	Vasco da Gama	Goiânia
	Araújo 24'; Alex Dias 75'		61' Donizete; 90+3' Luizão	Stadium: Estádio Serra Dourada

=== Copa do Brasil ===
27 January 1998 Round of 32: leg I	Picos	1 – 1	Vasco da Gama	Picos
	Brinquedo 25'		5' Ramon	Stadium: Estádio Municipal Helvídio Nunes de Barros

10 February 1998 Round of 32: leg II	Vasco da Gama	8 – 0 (9 – 1 agg.)	Picos	Rio de Janeiro
	Luizão 1', 62', 68'; Pedrinho 21', 55', 78'; Nasa 30'; Felipe 88'			Stadium: Estádio Vasco da Gama (São Januário)

1 March 1998 Round of 16: leg I	Vasco da Gama	2 – 0	Vila Nova	Rio de Janeiro
	Donizete 28'; Luizão 36'			Stadium: Estádio Vasco da Gama (São Januário)

12 March 1998 Round of 16: leg II	Vila Nova	0 – 0 (0 – 2 agg.)	Vasco da Gama	Goiânia
				Stadium: Estádio Serra Dourada

7 May 1998 Quarterfinals: leg I	São Paulo	1 – 1	Vasco da Gama	São Paulo
	Gallo 81'		71' Luizão	Stadium: Estádio Cícero Pompeu de Toledo (Morumbi)

12 May 1998 Quarterfinals: leg II	Vasco da Gama	4 – 3 (5 – 4 agg.)	São Paulo	Rio de Janeiro
	Luizão 3'; Pedrinho 11'; Donizete 21', 30'		1', 58' Raí; 15' Bordon	Stadium: Estádio Vasco da Gama (São Januário)

19 May 1998 Semifinals: leg I	Cruzeiro	2 – 0	Vasco da Gama	Belo Horizonte
	Bentinho 31'; Gottardo 48'			Stadium: Estádio Governador Magalhães Pinto (Mineirão)

23 May 1998 Semifinals: leg II	Vasco da Gama	0 – 0 (0 – 2 agg.)	Cruzeiro	Rio de Janeiro
				Stadium: Estádio Vasco da Gama (São Januário)

=== Copa Libertadores ===
Vasco da Gama joined the competition in the group stage.

==== Group stage ====
Group E

4 March 1998 I	Grêmio (Brazil)	1 – 0	(Brazil) Vasco da Gama	Porto Alegre, Brazil
	Guilherme 63'			Stadium: Estádio Olímpico Monumental

17 March 1998 II	Guadalajara (Mexico)	1 – 0	(Brazil) Vasco da Gama	Guadalajara, Mexico
	Ramírez 45'			Stadium: Estadio Jalisco

20 March 1998 III	América (Mexico)	1 – 1	(Brazil) Vasco da Gama	Tlalpan, Mexico City, Mexico
	Cedrés 3'		6' Ramon	Stadium: Estadio Azteca

26 March 1998 IV	Vasco da Gama (Brazil)	3 – 0	(Brazil) Grêmio	Rio de Janeiro, Brazil
	Luizão 38', 44'; Donizete 56'			Stadium: Estádio Vasco da Gama (São Januário)

3 April 1998 V	Vasco da Gama (Brazil)	2 – 0	(Mexico) Guadalajara	Rio de Janeiro, Brazil
	Luizão 24', 35'			Stadium: Estádio Vasco da Gama (São Januário)

9 April 1998 VI	Vasco da Gama (Brazil)	1 – 1	(Mexico) América	Rio de Janeiro, Brazil
	Richardson 73'		6' García Aspe	Stadium: Estádio Vasco da Gama (São Januário)

==== Knockout phase ====
15 April 1998 Round of 16: leg I	Vasco da Gama (Brazil)	2 – 1	(Brazil) Cruzeiro	Rio de Janeiro, Brazil
	Luizão 27'; Donizete 58'		22' Marcelo Ramos	Stadium: Estádio Vasco da Gama (São Januário)

2 May 1998 Round of 16: leg II	Cruzeiro (Brazil)	0 – 0 (1 – 2 agg.)	(Brazil) Vasco da Gama	Belo Horizonte, Brazil
				Stadium: Estádio Governador Magalhães Pinto (Mineirão)

3 June 1998 Quarterfinals: leg I	Grêmio (Brazil)	1 – 1	(Brazil) Vasco da Gama	Porto Alegre, Brazil
	Guilherme 54'		48' Pedrinho	Stadium: Estádio Olímpico Monumental

6 June 1998 Quarterfinals: leg II	Vasco da Gama (Brazil)	1 – 0 (2 – 1 agg.)	(Brazil) Grêmio	Rio de Janeiro, Brazil
	Pedrinho 41'			Stadium: Estádio Vasco da Gama (São Januário)

16 July 1998 Semifinals: leg I	Vasco da Gama (Brazil)	1 – 0	(Argentina) River Plate	Rio de Janeiro, Brazil
	Donizete 11'			Stadium: Estádio Vasco da Gama (São Januário)

22 July 1998 Semifinals: leg II	River Plate (Argentina)	1 – 1 (1 – 2 agg.)	(Brazil) Vasco da Gama	Buenos Aires, Argentina
	Sorín 23'		83' Juninho	Stadium: Estadio Monumental Antonio Vespucio Liberti

12 August 1998 Finals: leg I	Vasco da Gama (Brazil)	2 – 0	(Ecuador) Barcelona de Guayaquil	Rio de Janeiro, Brazil
	Donizete 8'; Luizão 34'			Stadium: Estádio Vasco da Gama (São Januário)

26 August 1998 Finals: leg II	Barcelona de Guayaquil (Ecuador)	1 – 2 (1 – 4 agg.)	(Brazil) Vasco da Gama	Guayaquil, Ecuador
	de Ávila 80'		25' Luizão; 45+2' Donizete	Stadium: Estadio Monumental Isidro Romero Carbo

Copa Libertadores
champion – 1998

=== Campeonato Carioca ===
==== Taça Guanabara ====
===== Matches =====
18 January 1998 I	Vasco da Gama	v	Bangu	Rio de Janeiro
				Stadium: Estádio Vasco da Gama (São Januário)

1 February 1998 II	Vasco da Gama	v	Americano	Rio de Janeiro
				Stadium: Estádio Vasco da Gama (São Januário)

8 March 1998 III	Vasco da Gama	v	Fluminense	Rio de Janeiro
				Stadium: Estádio Mário Filho (Maracanã)

29 March 1998 IV	Botafogo	v	Vasco da Gama	Rio de Janeiro
				Stadium: Estádio Mário Filho (Maracanã)

7 April 1998 V	Friburguense	v	Vasco da Gama	Nova Friburgo
				Stadium: Estádio Eduardo Guinle

12 April 1998 VI	Madureira	v	Vasco da Gama	Rio de Janeiro
				Stadium: Estádio Aniceto Moscoso (Conselheiro Galvão)

19 April 1998 VII	Flamengo	v	Vasco da Gama	Rio de Janeiro
				Stadium: Estádio Mário Filho (Maracanã)

==== Taça Rio de Janeiro ====
===== Matches =====
22 April 1998 II	Americano	v	Vasco da Gama	Campos dos Goytacazes
				Stadium: Estádio Godofredo Cruz

26 April 1998 V	Vasco da Gama	v	Friburguense	Rio de Janeiro
				Stadium: Estádio Vasco da Gama (São Januário)

29 April 1998 VI	Vasco da Gama	v	Madureira	Rio de Janeiro
				Stadium: Estádio Vasco da Gama (São Januário)

10 May 1998 IV	Vasco da Gama	W.O. –	Botafogo	Rio de Janeiro
				Stadium: Estádio Mário Filho (Maracanã)

14 May 1998 I	Bangu	v	Vasco da Gama	Rio de Janeiro
				Stadium: Estádio Proletário Guilherme da Silveira Filho (Moça Bonita)

17 May 1998 VII	Vasco da Gama	W.O. –	Flamengo	Rio de Janeiro
				Stadium: Estádio Mário Filho (Maracanã)

21 May 1998 III	Fluminense	v	Vasco da Gama	Rio de Janeiro
				Stadium: Estádio Mário Filho (Maracanã)

==== Championship phase ====
Campeonato do Estado do Rio de Janeiro
champion – 1998

=== Intercontinental Cup ===
1 December 1998 Final	Real Madrid (Spain)	v	(Brazil) Vasco da Gama	Shinjuku-ku, Tokyo, Japan
				Stadium: Kokuritsu Kyōgijō

=== Copa Interamericana ===
14 November 1998 Finals: leg I	D.C. United (United States)	v	(Brazil) Vasco da Gama	Washington, D.C., United States
				Stadium: Robert F. Kennedy Memorial Stadium

5 December 1998 Finals: leg II	Vasco da Gama (Brazil)	v	(United States) D.C. United	Fort Lauderdale, Florida, United States
				Stadium: Lockhart Stadium

=== Copa Mercosur ===
==== Group stage ====
Group E

30 July 1998 I	Universidad Católica (Chile)	v	(Brazil) Vasco da Gama	Las Condes, Santiago, Chile

18 August 1998 II	Vasco da Gama (Brazil)	v	(Brazil) Grêmio	Rio de Janeiro, Brazil

3 September 1998 III	River Plate (Argentina)	v	(Brazil) Vasco da Gama	Buenos Aires, Argentina

16 September 1998 IV	Vasco da Gama (Brazil)	v	(Argentina) River Plate	Rio de Janeiro, Brazil

29 September 1998 V	Grêmio (Brazil)	v	(Brazil) Vasco da Gama	Porto Alegre, Brazil

14 October 1998 VI	Vasco da Gama (Brazil)	v	(Chile) Universidad Católica	Rio de Janeiro, Brazil

=== Torneio Rio–São Paulo ===
==== Group stage ====
Group A

21 January 1998 I	Vasco da Gama	v	Palmeiras	Rio de Janeiro

24 January 1998 II	Botafogo	v	Vasco da Gama	Brasília

29 January 1998 III	Corinthians	v	Vasco da Gama	São Paulo

4 February 1998 IV	Palmeiras	v	Vasco da Gama	São Paulo

7 February 1998 V	Vasco da Gama	v	Botafogo	Brasília

12 February 1998 VI	Vasco da Gama	v	Corinthians	Rio de Janeiro

== Statistics ==
=== Squad appearances and goals ===
Last updated on 5 December 1998.

No.	Pos	Nat	Player	Total		Brasileirão Série A league stage		Copa do Brasil		Copa Libertadores		Campeonato do Estado do Rio de Janeiro		Intercontinentals Cups (Note: Includes appearances in European – South American Cup and South American – North American Cup.)		Other (Note: Includes appearances in Torneio Rio de Janeiro – São Paulo, Copa Mercosur and friendlies.)	
No.	Pos	Nat	Player	Apps	Goals	Apps	Goals	Apps	Goals	Apps	Goals	Apps	Goals	Apps	Goals	Apps	Goals
Goalkeepers
	GK	(Brazil) BRA	Caetano	3	0	0+1	0	0	0	2	0	0	0	0	0	0	0
	GK	(Brazil) BRA	Carlos Germano	29	0	15	0	0	0	11	0	0	0	3	0	0	0
	GK	(Brazil) BRA	Márcio	9	0	8	0	0	0	1	0	0	0	0	0	0	0
Defenders
	DF	(Brazil) BRA	Alex	16	0	6+2	0	0	0	3+5	0	0	0	0	0	0	0
	DF	(Brazil) BRA	Felipe	36	2	19	1	0	0	13+1	0	0	0	3	1	0	0
	DF	(Brazil) BRA	Filipe Alvim	8	0	4+2	0	0	0	1	0	0	0	1	0	0	0
	DF	(Brazil) BRA	Flavinho	10	0	5+4	0	0	0	0	0	0	0	1	0	0	0
	DF	(Brazil) BRA	Géder	6	0	3+1	0	0	0	1+1	0	0	0	0	0	0	0
	DF	(Brazil) BRA	Henrique	6	1	1+4	1	0	0	0	0	0	0	1	0	0	0
	DF	(Brazil) BRA	Maricá	14	0	3+6	0	0	0	3+2	0	0	0	0	0	0	0
	DF	(Brazil) BRA	Mauro Galvão	31	2	16	2	0	0	13	0	0	0	2	0	0	0
	DF	(Brazil) BRA	Odvan	34	0	20	0	0	0	11	0	0	0	3	0	0	0
	DF	(Brazil) BRA	Ronaldo Luiz	3	0	0+1	0	0	0	1+1	0	0	0	0	0	0	0
	DF	(Brazil) BRA	Válber	21	0	9+4	0	0	0	2+4	0	0	0	0+2	0	0	0
	DF	(Brazil) BRA	Valkmar	1	0	0+1	0	0	0	0	0	0	0	0	0	0	0
	DF	(Brazil) BRA	Vítor	18	0	5+1	0	0	0	7+3	0	0	0	0+2	0	0	0
Midfielders
	MF	(Brazil) BRA	Fabiano Eller	1	0	0	0	0	0	1	0	0	0	0	0	0	0
	MF	(Brazil) BRA	Fabrício Carvalho	9	0	3+6	0	0	0	0	0	0	0	0	0	0	0
	MF	(Brazil) BRA	Fabrício Eduardo	9	0	2+2	0	0	0	1+4	0	0	0	0	0	0	0
	MF	(Brazil) BRA	Gian	4	0	3+1	0	0	0	0	0	0	0	0	0	0	0
	MF	(Brazil) BRA	Juninho	27	5	18	3	0	0	5+2	1	0	0	2	1	0	0
	MF	(Brazil) BRA	Luisinho	30	0	16	0	0	0	11	0	0	0	3	0	0	0
	MF	(Brazil) BRA	Nasa	33	0	18	0	0	0	12	0	0	0	3	0	0	0
	MF	(Brazil) BRA	Nélson	17	1	5+6	1	0	0	3+2	0	0	0	0+1	0	0	0
	MF	(Brazil) BRA	Pedrinho	19	4	6	2	0	0	12+1	2	0	0	0	0	0	0
	MF	(Brazil) BRA	Ramon	32	11	17+2	10	0	0	7+4	1	0	0	2	0	0	0
	MF	(Brazil) BRA	Richardson	5	1	0+1	0	0	0	1+3	1	0	0	0	0	0	0
	MF	(Brazil) BRA	Vágner	20	0	10+2	0	0	0	4+2	0	0	0	2	0	0	0
	MF	(Brazil) BRA	Zada	3	0	0+2	0	0	0	0	0	0	0	0+1	0	0	0
Forwards
	FW	(Brazil) BRA	Brener	2	0	1+1	0	0	0	0	0	0	0	0	0	0	0
	FW	(Brazil) BRA	Dedé	7	1	4+3	1	0	0	0	0	0	0	0	0	0	0
	FW	(Brazil) BRA	Donizete	27	7	11	2	0	0	13	5	0	0	3	0	0	0
	FW	(Brazil) BRA	Guilherme	3	0	0	0	0	0	0	0	0	0	1+2	0	0	0
	FW	(Brazil) BRA	Luiz Cláudio	8	1	4+3	1	0	0	0+1	0	0	0	0	0	0	0
	FW	(Brazil) BRA	Luizão	30	15	14	8	0	0	13	7	0	0	3	0	0	0
	FW	(Brazil) BRA	Mauricinho	12	0	3+5	0	0	0	1+2	0	0	0	0+1	0	0	0
	FW	(Brazil) BRA	Rogério	4	0	2+2	0	0	0	0	0	0	0	0	0	0	0
	FW	(Brazil) BRA	Sorato	4	1	2+1	1	0	0	1	0	0	0	0	0	0	0
