= 1997 CR Vasco da Gama season =

Vasco da Gama
1997 season
- Chairman: Antônio Soares Calçada
- Manager: Antônio Lopes
- Stadium: São Januário; Maracanã
- Campeonato Brasileiro Série A: Final phase: Champions; League stage: 1st
- Copa do Brasil: Round of 16
- Campeonato Carioca: Runners-up; Taça Guanabara: Runners-up; Taça Rio de Janeiro: 4th Terceira Taça: Champions
- Supercopa Libertadores: Group stage
- Torneio Rio–São Paulo: Quarterfinals
Home colours	Away colours

The 1997 season was Club de Regatas Vasco da Gama 99th year in existence, the club's 82nd season in existence of football, and the club's 27th season playing in the Campeonato Brasileiro Série A, the top flight of Brazilian football.

Vasco won the 1997 Série A, beating Palmeiras in the final.

== Pre-season and friendlies ==
15 June 1997	Vasco da Gama	v	America	Cachoeiras de Macacu

=== Trofeo Teresa Herrera ===
12 August 1997 Semifinals	Deportivo de La Coruña (Spain)	v	(Brazil) Vasco da Gama	A Coruña, Spain
				Stadium: Estadio Riazor

14 August 1997 Third place	Atlético Madrid (Spain)	v	(Brazil) Vasco da Gama	A Coruña, Spain
				Stadium: Estadio Riazor

== Competitions ==
Times from 1 January to 15 February 1997 and from 6 October to 31 December 1997 are UTC–2, from 16 February 1997 to 5 October 1997 UTC–3.

=== Campeonato Brasileiro Série A ===
==== League table ====
Pos	Team	Pld	W	D	L	GF	GA	GD	Pts	
1	Vasco da Gama	25	17	3	5	55	32	+23	54	Qualified to Second Phase
2	Internacional	25	15	6	4	52	21	+31	51	Qualified to Second Phase
3	Atlético Mineiro	25	14	5	6	42	33	+9	47	Qualified to Second Phase
4	Portuguesa	25	12	9	4	45	28	+17	45	Qualified to Second Phase
5	Flamengo	25	12	6	7	30	24	+6	42	Qualified to Second Phase

Source: https://rsssfbrasil.com/tablesae/br1997.htm

==== Matches ====
16 July 1997 I	Corinthians	2 – 1	Vasco da Gama	São Paulo
				Stadium: Estádio Municipal Paulo Machado de Carvalho (Pacaembu)

20 July 1997 II	Vasco da Gama	3 – 3	Juventude	Rio de Janeiro
				Stadium: Estádio Vasco da Gama (São Januário)

23 July 1997 III	Vasco da Gama	2 – 1	São Paulo	Rio de Janeiro
				Stadium: Estádio Vasco da Gama (São Januário)

27 July 1997 IV	Flamengo	0 – 1	Vasco da Gama	Rio de Janeiro
				Stadium: Estádio Mário Filho (Maracanã)

30 July 1997 V	Goiás	0 – 2	Vasco da Gama	Rio de Janeiro
				Stadium: Estádio Vasco da Gama (São Januário)

3 August 1997 VI	Fluminense	1 – 3	Vasco da Gama	Rio de Janeiro
				Stadium: Estádio Mário Filho (Maracanã)

17 August 1997 VII	Vasco da Gama	3 – 0	Bragantino	Rio de Janeiro
				Stadium: Estádio Vasco da Gama (São Januário)

20 August 1997 VIII	América (Natal)	0 – 0	Vasco da Gama	Natal, Rio Grande do Norte

24 August 1997 IX	Santos	3 – 1	Vasco da Gama	Santos, São Paulo
				Stadium: Estádio Urbano Caldeira (Vila Belmiro)

30 August 1997 X	Sport do Recife	2 – 3	Vasco da Gama	Recife

6 September 1997 XI	Grêmio	3 – 1	Vasco da Gama	Porto Alegre
				Stadium: Estádio Olímpico Monumental

11 September 1997 XII	Vasco da Gama	6 – 0	União São João	Rio de Janeiro
	Edmundo			Stadium: Estádio Vasco da Gama (São Januário)

14 September 1997 XIII	Vitória	4 – 2	Vasco da Gama	Salvador, Bahia

17 September 1997 XIV	Vasco da Gama	2 – 1	Internacional	Rio de Janeiro
				Stadium: Estádio Vasco da Gama (São Januário)

20 September 1997 XV	Vasco da Gama	4 – 1	Paraná	Rio de Janeiro
				Stadium: Estádio Vasco da Gama (São Januário)

28 September 1997 XVI	Portuguesa	1 – 2	Vasco da Gama	São Paulo

1 October 1997 XVII	Vasco da Gama	2 – 1	Palmeiras	Rio de Janeiro
				Stadium: Estádio Vasco da Gama (São Januário)

5 October 1997 XVIII	Vasco da Gama	2 – 1	Atlético Paranaense	Rio de Janeiro
				Stadium: Estádio Vasco da Gama (São Januário)

8 October 1997 XIX	Cruzeiro	0 – 0	Vasco da Gama	Belo Horizonte

11 October 1997 XX	Coritiba	1 – 3	Vasco da Gama	Curitiba
				Stadium: Estádio Major Antônio Couto Pereira

19 October 1997 XXI	Vasco da Gama	1 – 0	Botafogo	Rio de Janeiro
				Stadium: Estádio Mário Filho (Maracanã)

26 October 1997 XXII	Criciúma	3 – 4	Vasco da Gama	Criciúma
				Stadium: Estádio Heriberto Hülse

2 November 1997 XXIII	Vasco da Gama	3 – 1	Bahia	Rio de Janeiro
				Stadium: Estádio Vasco da Gama (São Januário)

4 November 1997 XXIV	Vasco da Gama	2 – 0	Atlético Mineiro	Rio de Janeiro
				Stadium: Estádio Mário Filho (Maracanã)

8 November 1997 XXV	Guarani	3 – 2	Vasco da Gama	Campinas

==== Championship phase ====
===== Group stage =====
15 November 1997 I	Juventude	v	Vasco da Gama	Porto Alegre

23 November 1997 II	Vasco da Gama	v	Flamengo	Rio de Janeiro
				Stadium: Estádio Mário Filho (Maracanã)

26 November 1997 III	Vasco da Gama	v	Portuguesa	Rio de Janeiro
				Stadium: Estádio Mário Filho (Maracanã)

29 November 1997 IV	Portuguesa	v	Vasco da Gama	São Paulo

3 December 1997 V	Flamengo	v	Vasco da Gama	Rio de Janeiro
				Stadium: Estádio Mário Filho (Maracanã)

7 December 1997 VI	Vasco da Gama	v	Juventude	Rio de Janeiro
				Stadium: Estádio Mário Filho (Maracanã)

===== Finals =====
14 December 1997 Finals: leg I	Palmeiras	v	Vasco da Gama	São Paulo
				Stadium: Estádio Cícero Pompeu de Toledo (Morumbi)

21 December 1997 Finals: leg II	Vasco da Gama	v	Palmeiras	Rio de Janeiro
				Stadium: Estádio Mário Filho (Maracanã)

Brasileirão Série A
champion – 1997

=== Copa do Brasil ===
20 February 1997 Second round	Sergipe	v	Vasco da Gama	Aracaju
				Stadium: Estádio Lourival Baptista (Batistão)

3 April 1997 Round of 16: leg I	Atlético Paranaense	v	Vasco da Gama	Curitiba
				Stadium: Centro Poliesportivo Pinheiro (Pinheirão)

10 April 1997 Round of 16: leg II	Vasco da Gama	v	Atlético Paranaense	Rio de Janeiro
				Stadium: Estádio Vasco da Gama (São Januário)

=== Campeonato Carioca ===
==== Taça Guanabara ====
===== League stage =====
12 January 1997 I	Vasco da Gama	v	Bangu	Rio de Janeiro
				Stadium: Estádio Vasco da Gama (São Januário)

15 January 1997 II	Madureira	v	Vasco da Gama	Rio de Janeiro
				Stadium: Estádio Aniceto Moscoso (Conselheiro Galvão)

19 January 1997 III	Vasco da Gama	v	Volta Redonda	Rio de Janeiro
				Stadium: Estádio Vasco da Gama (São Januário)

2 February 1997 IV	Barreira	v	Vasco da Gama	Saquarema
				Stadium: Estádio Elcyr Resende de Mendonça (Bacaxá)

13 February 1997 V	Olaria	v	Vasco da Gama	Rio de Janeiro
				Stadium: Estádio Mourão Vieira Filho (Rua Bariri)

23 February 1997 VI	Vasco da Gama	v	Americano	Rio de Janeiro
				Stadium: Estádio Vasco da Gama (São Januário)

2 March 1997 VII	Vasco da Gama	v	Fluminense	Rio de Janeiro
				Stadium: Estádio Vasco da Gama (São Januário)

9 March 1997 VIII	Vasco da Gama	v	Botafogo	Rio de Janeiro
				Stadium: Estádio Vasco da Gama (São Januário)

12 March 1997 IX	Itaperuna	v	Vasco da Gama	Itaperuna
				Stadium: Estádio Jair Bittencourt

16 March 1997 X	Vasco da Gama	v	America	Rio de Janeiro
				Stadium: Estádio Vasco da Gama (São Januário)

23 March 1997 XI	Flamengo	v	Vasco da Gama	Rio de Janeiro
				Stadium: Estádio Mário Filho (Maracanã)

===== Final =====
30 March 1997 Final	Botafogo	v	Vasco da Gama	Rio de Janeiro
				Stadium: Estádio Mário Filho (Maracanã)

==== Taça Rio de Janeiro ====
===== Matches =====
6 April 1997 I	Bangu	v	Vasco da Gama	Rio de Janeiro
				Stadium: Estádio Proletário Guilherme da Silveira Filho (Moça Bonita)

13 April 1997 II	Fluminense	v	Vasco da Gama	Rio de Janeiro
				Stadium: Estádio Mário Filho (Maracanã)

16 April 1997 III	Vasco da Gama	v	Volta Redonda	Rio de Janeiro
				Stadium: Estádio Vasco da Gama (São Januário)

20 April 1997 IV	Americano	v	Vasco da Gama	Campos dos Goytacazes
				Stadium: Estádio Godofredo Cruz

23 April 1997 V	Vasco da Gama	v	Madureira	Rio de Janeiro
				Stadium: Estádio Vasco da Gama (São Januário)

27 April 1997 VI	Botafogo	v	Vasco da Gama	Rio de Janeiro
				Stadium: Estádio Mário Filho (Maracanã)

3 May 1997 VII	Vasco da Gama	v	Flamengo	Cabo Frio
				Stadium: Estádio Alair Corrêa (Correão)

==== Terceira Taça ====
===== Matches =====
7 May 1997 I	Vasco da Gama	v	Americano	Rio de Janeiro
				Stadium: Estádio Vasco da Gama (São Januário)

14 May 1997 II	Fluminense	v	Vasco da Gama	Rio de Janeiro
				Stadium: Estádio Mário Filho (Maracanã)

18 May 1997 III	Vasco da Gama	v	Bangu	Rio de Janeiro
				Stadium: Estádio Vasco da Gama (São Januário)

24 May 1997 IV	Botafogo	v	Vasco da Gama	Rio de Janeiro
				Stadium: Estádio Mário Filho (Maracanã)

3 July 1997 V	Flamengo	– W.O.	Vasco da Gama	Rio de Janeiro
				Stadium: Estádio Mário Filho (Maracanã)

==== Championship phase ====
5 July 1997 Finals: leg I	Vasco da Gama	v	Botafogo	Rio de Janeiro
				Stadium: Estádio Mário Filho (Maracanã)

8 July 1997 Finals: leg II	Botafogo	v	Vasco da Gama	Rio de Janeiro
				Stadium: Estádio Mário Filho (Maracanã)

=== Supercopa Libertadores ===
==== Preliminary round ====
Group

20 June 1997 I	Vasco da Gama (Brazil)	v	(Uruguay) Peñarol	Rio de Janeiro, Brazil

24 June 1997 II	Vasco da Gama (Brazil)	v	(Uruguay) Nacional	Rio de Janeiro, Brazil

11 July 1997 III	Peñarol (Uruguay)	v	(Brazil) Vasco da Gama	Montevideo, Uruguay

13 July 1997 IV	Nacional (Uruguay)	v	(Brazil) Vasco da Gama	Montevideo, Uruguay

==== Group stage ====
Group C

28 August 1997 I	Vasco da Gama (Brazil)	v	(Brazil) Santos	Rio de Janeiro, Brazil

2 September 1997 II	Vasco da Gama (Brazil)	v	(Argentina) Racing de Avellaneda	Rio de Janeiro, Brazil

24 September 1997 III	River Plate (Argentina)	v	(Brazil) Vasco da Gama	Buenos Aires, Argentina

16 October 1997 IV	Santos (Brazil)	v	(Brazil) Vasco da Gama	Santos, São Paulo, Brazil

21 October 1997 V	Racing de Avellaneda (Argentina)	v	(Brazil) Vasco da Gama	Avellaneda, Buenos Aires, Argentina

30 October 1997 VI	Vasco da Gama (Brazil)	v	(Argentina) River Plate	Rio de Janeiro, Brazil

=== Torneio Rio de Janeiro – São Paulo ===
21 January 1997 Quarterfinals: leg I	Santos	v	Vasco da Gama	São Paulo

25 January 1997 Quarterfinals: leg II	Vasco da Gama	v	Santos	Rio de Janeiro

== Statistics ==
=== Squad appearances and goals ===
Last updated on 21 December 1997.

No.	Pos	Nat	Player	Total		Brasileirão Série A league stage		Brasileirão Série A final phase		Copa do Brasil		Campeonato do Estado Rio de Janeiro		Other (Note: Includes appearances in Supercopa Libertadores, Torneio Rio de Janeiro – São Paulo, Trofeo Teresa Herrera and friendlies.)	
No.	Pos	Nat	Player	Apps	Goals	Apps	Goals	Apps	Goals	Apps	Goals	Apps	Goals	Apps	Goals
Goalkeepers
	GK	(Brazil) BRA	Caetano	5	0	3	0	0+1	0	1	0	0	0	0	0
	GK	(Brazil) BRA	Carlos Germano	16	0	7	0	7	0	2	0	0	0	0	0
	GK	(Brazil) BRA	Márcio	17	0	15+1	0	1	0	0	0	0	0	0	0
Defenders
	DF	(Brazil) BRA	Alex	24	1	12+4	0	3+3	0	2	1	0	0	0	0
	DF	(Brazil) BRA	Cafezinho	1	0	1	0	0	0	0	0	0	0	0	0
	DF	(Brazil) BRA	César Prates	11	0	9	0	2	0	0	0	0	0	0	0
	DF	(Brazil) BRA	Felipe	31	1	19+2	1	6+1	0	3	0	0	0	0	0
	DF	(Brazil) BRA	Filipe Alvim	12	1	5+5	1	2	0	0	0	0	0	0	0
	DF	(Brazil) BRA	Maricá	17	2	12+1	1	3+1	1	0	0	0	0	0	0
	DF	(Brazil) BRA	Mauro Galvão	29	3	22	2	7	1	0	0	0	0	0	0
	DF	(Brazil) BRA	Moisés	10	0	1+6	0	1+1	0	1	0	0	0	0	0
	DF	(Brazil) BRA	Odvan	22	1	16+1	1	5	0	0	0	0	0	0	0
	DF	(Brazil) BRA	Tinho	1	1	0	0	0	0	1	1	0	0	0	0
	DF	(Brazil) BRA	Válber	21	1	10+4	1	4+3	0	0	0	0	0	0	0
	DF	(Brazil) BRA	Alessandro	1	0	0	0	0	0	1	0	0	0	0	0
	DF	(Brazil) BRA	Joao Luiz	1	0	0	0	0	0	1	0	0	0	0	0
	DF	(Brazil) BRA	Pimentel	2	0	0	0	0	0	2	0	0	0	0	0
Midfielders
	MF	(Brazil) BRA	Fabiano Eller	1	0	1	0	0	0	0	0	0	0	0	0
	MF	(Brazil) BRA	Fabrício Carvalho	15	0	6+7	0	1+1	0	0	0	0	0	0	0
	MF	(Brazil) BRA	Fabrício Eduardo	8	0	1+3	0	0+1	0	3	0	0	0	0	0
	MF	(Brazil) BRA	Juninho	21	5	10+1	2	7	2	3	1	0	0	0	0
	MF	(Brazil) BRA	Luisinho	29	0	21	0	5	0	2+1	0	0	0	0	0
	MF	(Brazil) BRA	Nasa	25	0	14+4	0	7	0	0	0	0	0	0	0
	MF	(Brazil) BRA	Nélson	10	0	1+2	0	2+4	0	1	0	0	0	0	0
	MF	(Brazil) BRA	Pedrinho	29	6	16+5	4	1+4	1	2+1	1	0	0	0	0
	MF	(Brazil) BRA	Ramon	31	9	23	6	7	1	1	2	0	0	0	0
	MF	(Brazil) BRA	Cristiano	1	0	0	0	0	0	1	0	0	0	0	0
	MF	(Brazil) BRA	Dias	1	0	0	0	0	0	0+1	0	0	0	0	0
Forwards
	FW	(Brazil) BRA	Brener	4	1	1+2	1	0+1	0	0	0	0	0	0	0
	FW	(Brazil) BRA	Edmundo	29	29	21	24	7	5	1	0	0	0	0	0
	FW	(Brazil) BRA	Espíndola	1	0	0+1	0	0	0	0	0	0	0	0	0
	FW	(Brazil) BRA	Evair	28	8	21	7	7	1	0	0	0	0	0	0
	FW	(Brazil) BRA	Luiz Cláudio	6	1	1+4	1	1	0	0	0	0	0	0	0
	FW	(Brazil) BRA	Mauricinho	20	4	5+10	1	1+1	0	3	3	0	0	0	0
	FW	(Brazil) BRA	Sorato	4	1	1+2	1	1	0	0	0	0	0	0	0
	FW	(Brazil) BRA	Almir	2	1	0	0	0	0	1+1	1	0	0	0	0
	FW	(Brazil) BRA	George	2	0	0	0	0	0	1+1	0	0	0	0	0
