= 1999 CR Vasco da Gama season =

Vasco da Gama
1999 season
- Chairman: Antônio Soares Calçada
- Manager: Antônio Lopes
- Stadium: São Januário; Maracanã
- Campeonato Brasileiro Série A: Knockout phase: Quarterfinals; League stage: 3rd
- Copa do Brasil: Round of 16
- Campeonato Carioca: Runners-up; Taça Guanabara: Runners-up; Taça Rio de Janeiro: Champions
- Copa Libertadores: Round of 16
- Copa Mercosur: Group stage
- Torneio Rio–São Paulo: Champions
- Top goalscorer: Edmundo (13)
Home colours	Away colours

The 1999 season was Club de Regatas Vasco da Gama's 101st year in existence, the club's 84th season in existence of football, and the club's 29th season playing in the Campeonato Brasileiro Série A, the top flight of Brazilian football.

== Players ==
Djabo Loior

Cuckanderson Wins

== Pre-season and friendlies ==
17 January 1999	Vasco da Gama	v	Olaria	Nova Friburgo

20 January 1999	Friburguense	v	Vasco da Gama	Nova Friburgo

9 August 1999	Málaga (Spain)	v	(Brazil) Vasco da Gama	Málaga, Spain

=== Trofeo Ramón de Carranza ===
6 August 1999 Semifinals	Real Betis (Spain)	v	(Brazil) Vasco da Gama	Cádiz, Spain
				Stadium: Estadio Ramón de Carranza

7 August 1999 Third place	Cádiz (Spain)	v	(Brazil) Vasco da Gama	Cádiz, Spain
				Stadium: Estadio Ramón de Carranza

== Competitions ==
Times from 1 January to 20 February 1999 and from 3 October to 31 December 1999 are UTC–2, from 21 February 1999 to 2 October 1999 UTC–3.

=== Campeonato Brasileiro Série A ===
==== League stage ====
===== League table =====
Pos	Team	Pld	W	D	L	GF	GA	GD	Pts	Qualification
1	Corinthians	21	14	2	5	49	31	+18	44	Championship knockout phase
2	Cruzeiro	21	12	6	3	46	32	+14	42	Championship knockout phase
3	Vasco da Gama	21	10	6	5	33	23	+10	36	Championship knockout phase
4	Ponte Preta	21	10	5	6	23	16	+7	35	Championship knockout phase
5	São Paulo	21	11	1	9	35	24	+11	34 (Note: CBF awarded Botafogo and Internacional 1–0 away wins due to São Paulo footballer Sandro Hiroshi gate. Originally São Paulo had defeated Botafogo 6–1 home and drawn 2–2 home with Internacional.)	Championship knockout phase

Source: RSSSF
Rules for classification: 1) points; 2) goal difference; 3) number of goals scored.

===== Results summary =====
Overall								Home						Away					
Pld	W	D	L	GF	GA	GD	Pts	W	D	L	GF	GA	GD	W	D	L	GF	GA	GD
0	0	0	0	0	0	0	0	0	0	0	0	0	0	0	0	0	0	0	0

Last updated: 11 November 1999.

===== Result round by round =====
Round	1	2	3	4	5	6	7	8	9	10	11	12	13	14	15	16	17	18	19	20	21
Ground	A	N	A	H	A	H	H	A	H	A	H	H	N	A	H	H	A	A	H	A	H
Result																					
Position																					

Updated to match(es) played on 11 November 1999. Source:
A = Away; H = Home; W = Win; D = Draw; L = Loss

===== Matches =====
25 July 1999 I	Sport do Recife	0 – 0	Vasco da Gama	Recife
				Stadium: Estádio Adelmar da Costa Carvalho (Ilha do Retiro)

15 August 1999 II	Vasco da Gama	2 – 1	Botafogo	Rio de Janeiro
	Donizete 3', 60'		49' Sérgio Manoel	Stadium: Estádio Mário Filho (Maracanã)

18 August 1999 III	Grêmio	0 – 0	Vasco da Gama	Porto Alegre
				Stadium: Estádio Olímpico Monumental

22 August 1999 IV	Vasco da Gama	3 – 1	Vitória	Rio de Janeiro
	Ramon 45+1'; Viola 47'; Paulo César 68'		72' Artur	Stadium: Estádio Vasco da Gama (São Januário)

28 August 1999 V	Santos	1 – 1	Vasco da Gama	Santos, São Paulo
	Dodô 47'		42' Juninho	Stadium: Estádio Urbano Caldeira (Vila Belmiro)

5 September 1999 VI	Vasco da Gama	1 – 0	Atlético Mineiro	Rio de Janeiro
	Donizete 79'			Stadium: Estádio Vasco da Gama (São Januário)

11 September 1999 VII	Vasco da Gama	3 – 1	Ponte Preta	Rio de Janeiro
	Donizete 17'; Ramon 70'; Edmundo 86'		47' Regis Pitbull	Stadium: Estádio Vasco da Gama (São Januário)

15 September 1999 VIII	Guarani	1 – 0	Vasco da Gama	Campinas
	Rodrigo Jaú 90+3'			Stadium: Estádio Brinco de Ouro da Princesa

19 September 1999 IX	Vasco da Gama	1 – 1	Paraná	Rio de Janeiro
	Edmundo 38'		84' Everaldo	Stadium: Estádio Vasco da Gama (São Januário)

22 September 1999 X	Corinthians	2 – 4	Vasco da Gama	São Paulo
	Marcelinho Carioca 59'; César Prates 67'		10' Paulo Miranda; 17' Donizete; 69', 71' Edmundo	Stadium: Estádio Municipal Paulo Machado de Carvalho (Pacaembu)

26 September 1999 XI	Vasco da Gama	2 – 0	Internacional	Rio de Janeiro
	Edmundo 52', 59'			Stadium: Estádio Vasco da Gama (São Januário)

29 September 1999 XII	Vasco da Gama	1 – 2	São Paulo	Rio de Janeiro
	Gilberto 78'		54' Sandro Hiroshi; 68' França	Stadium: Estádio Mário Filho (Maracanã)

3 October 1999 XIII	Flamengo	0 – 1	Vasco da Gama	Rio de Janeiro
			86' Juninho	Stadium: Estádio Mário Filho (Maracanã)

9 October 1999 XIV	Coritiba	3 – 1	Vasco da Gama	Curitiba
	João Santos 12'; Cléber 49'; Jackson 90+3'		27' Edmundo	Stadium: Estádio Major Antônio Couto Pereira

13 October 1999 XV	Vasco da Gama	5 – 2	Gama	Rio de Janeiro
	Ramon 14', 86'; Edmundo 32', 71'; Odvan 60'		9' Lindomar; 45' Juary	Stadium: Estádio Vasco da Gama (São Januário)

16 October 1999 XVI	Vasco da Gama	2 – 1	Palmeiras	Rio de Janeiro
	Viola 13'; Gilberto 64'		63' Alex	Stadium: Estádio Vasco da Gama (São Januário)

20 October 1999 XVII	Portuguesa	1 – 1	Vasco da Gama	São Paulo
	Leandro Amaral 76'		31' Edmundo	Stadium: Estádio Oswaldo Teixeira Duarte (Canindé)

23 October 1999 XVIII	Juventude	2 – 1	Vasco da Gama	Caxias do Sul
	Índio Alagoano 50'; Cris 64'		26' Henrique	Stadium: Estádio Alfredo Jaconi

31 October 1999 XIX	Vasco da Gama	2 – 1	Atlético Paranaense	Rio de Janeiro
	Edmundo 15', 85'		66' Kelly	Stadium: Estádio Vasco da Gama (São Januário)

3 November 1999 XX	Cruzeiro	2 – 1	Vasco da Gama	Belo Horizonte
	André Luiz 35'; Valdo 40'		39' Donizete	Stadium: Estádio Governador Magalhães Pinto (Mineirão)

10 November 1999 XXI	Vasco da Gama	1 – 1	Botafogo (Ribeirão Preto)	Rio de Janeiro
	Edmundo 40'		18' Paulo César

==== Championship knockout phase ====
14 November 1999 Quarterfinals: leg I	Vitória	5 – 4	Vasco da Gama	Salvador, Bahia
	Artur 16'; Fernando 35', 56', 67'; Tuta 39'		7', 11' Viola; 46', 61' Donizete	Stadium: Estádio Manoel Barradas (Barradão)

21 November 1999 Quarterfinals: leg II	Vasco da Gama	2 – 2	Vitória	Rio de Janeiro
	Alex Oliveira 13'; Donizete 61'		45+1' Cláudio; 59' Tuta	Stadium: Estádio Vasco da Gama (São Januário)

24 November 1999 Quarterfinals: leg III	Vasco da Gama	1 – 1	Vitória	Rio de Janeiro
	Mauro Galvão 60'		70' Baiano	Stadium: Estádio Vasco da Gama (São Januário)

==== 2000 Copa Libertadores play-offs qualifier ====
27 November 1999 Second round: leg I	Ponte Preta	v	Vasco da Gama	Campinas

1 December 1999 Second round: leg II	Vasco da Gama	v	Ponte Preta	Rio de Janeiro

4 December 1999 Third round: leg I	Vasco da Gama	v	Cruzeiro	Rio de Janeiro

8 December 1999 Third round: leg II	Vasco da Gama	v	Cruzeiro	Belo Horizonte

=== Copa do Brasil ===
3 February 1999 First round	Ji-Paraná	2 – 4	Vasco da Gama	Porto Velho
	Palmiro 8'; Dudu 90+1'		19' Felipe; 33' (o.g.) Zé Carlos; 75' Mauro Galvão; 88' Guilherme	Stadium: Estádio Aluízio Pinheiro Ferreira

10 March 1999 Second round: leg I	América (Natal)	0 – 1	Vasco da Gama	Natal, Rio Grande do Norte
			68' Luizão	Stadium: Estádio Dr. João Cláudio Vasconcelos Machado (Machadão)

17 March 1999 Second round: leg II	Vasco da Gama	2 – 0 (3 – 0 agg.)	América (Natal)	Rio de Janeiro
	Ramon 53'; Guilherme 87'			Stadium: Estádio Vasco da Gama (São Januário)

8 April 1999 Round of 16: leg I	Goiás	4 – 2	Vasco da Gama	Goiânia
	Juninho 35'; Soares 51'; Fernandão 76'; Aloísio 84'		5' Ramon; 63' Zezinho	Stadium: Estádio Serra Dourada

5 May 1999 Round of 16: leg II	Vasco da Gama	2 – 1 (4 – 5 agg.)	Goiás	Rio de Janeiro
	Luizão 3'; Chiquinho 18'		23' Soares	Stadium: Estádio Vasco da Gama (São Januário)

=== Copa Libertadores ===
Vasco da Gama joined the competition in the round of 16 of the knockout phase due to be the title holders.

==== Knockout phase ====
14 April 1999 Round of 16: leg I	Palmeiras (Brazil)	1 – 1	(Brazil) Vasco da Gama	São Paulo
	Oséas 42'		65' Guilherme	Stadium: Estádio Palestra Itália (Parque Antarctica)

21 April 1999 Round of 16: leg II	Vasco da Gama (Brazil)	2 – 4 (3 – 5 agg.)	(Brazil) Palmeiras	Rio de Janeiro
	Luizão 4'; Ramon 36'		30' Paulo Nunes; 32', 48' Alex; 51' Arce	Stadium: Estádio Vasco da Gama (São Januário)

=== Campeonato Carioca ===
==== Taça Guanabara ====
Pos	Team	Pld	W	D	L	GF	GA	GD	Pts	Qualification
1	Flamengo	9	8	1	0	18	5	+13	25	Taça Guanabara champions, qualified for finals
2	Vasco da Gama	9	7	1	1	21	7	+14	22	
3	Fluminense	9	6	1	2	23	15	+8	19	
4	Friburguense	9	4	2	3	15	11	+4	14	
5	Olaria	9	4	2	3	14	16	−2	14	

Updated to match(es) played on April 18, 1999. Source: RSSSF.com
Rules for classification: 1) points; 2) wins; 3) goal difference; 4) number of goals scored.

6 March 1999 I	Vasco da Gama	4 – 0	Bangu	Rio de Janeiro
	Luizão 8'; Paulo Miranda 38'; Juninho 79'; Zezinho 90+3'			Stadium: Estádio Vasco da Gama (São Januário)

14 March 1999 II	Itaperuna	1 – 4	Vasco da Gama	Itaperuna
	Fábio Vigo 43'		36' Guilherme; 45+6' Juninho; 46', 60' Zezinho	Stadium: Estádio Jair Bittencourt

21 March 1999 III	Vasco da Gama	3 – 0	Fluminense	Rio de Janeiro
	Luizão 30', 62'; Felipe 82'			Stadium: Estádio Mário Filho (Maracanã)

24 March 1999 IV	Vasco da Gama	2 – 1	Friburguense	Rio de Janeiro
	Chiquinho 86'; Ramon 90+3'		45' Reginaldo	Stadium: Estádio Vasco da Gama (São Januário)

27 March 1999 V	Vasco da Gama	3 – 2	Americano	Rio de Janeiro
	Mauro Galvão 15'; Luizão 45', 60'		53' Camilo; 74' Édson Souza	Stadium: Estádio Vasco da Gama (São Januário)

31 March 1999 VI	Madureira	0 – 2	Vasco da Gama	Rio de Janeiro
			72' Luiz Cláudio; 78' Zé Maria	Stadium: Estádio Aniceto Moscoso (Conselheiro Galvão)

4 April 1999 VII	Olaria	1 – 1	Vasco da Gama	Rio de Janeiro
	Darci 81'		29' Zezinho	Stadium: Estádio Mourão Vieira Filho (Bariri)

11 April 1999 VIII	Vasco da Gama	1 – 0	Botafogo	Rio de Janeiro
	Juninho 85'			Stadium: Estádio Mário Filho (Maracanã)

18 April 1999 IX	Flamengo	2 – 1	Vasco da Gama	Rio de Janeiro
	Athirson 6'; Romário 20'		34' Odvan	Stadium: Estádio Mário Filho (Maracanã)

==== Taça Rio de Janeiro ====
Pos	Team	Pld	W	D	L	GF	GA	GD	Pts	Qualification
1	Vasco da Gama	9	7	2	0	23	5	+18	23	Taça Rio champions, qualified for finals
2	Flamengo	9	6	0	3	19	7	+12	18	
3	Madureira	9	4	3	2	16	18	−2	15	
4	Americano	9	4	2	3	16	16	0	14	
5	Fluminense	9	3	3	3	11	9	+2	12	

Updated to match(es) played on June 6, 1999. Source: RSSSF.com
Rules for classification: 1) points; 2) wins; 3) goal difference; 4) number of goals scored.

25 April 1999 I	Bangu	0 – 1	Vasco da Gama	Rio de Janeiro
			90+2' Luizão	Stadium: Estádio Proletário Guilherme da Silveira Filho (Moça Bonita)

1 May 1999 II	Vasco da Gama	5 – 0	Itaperuna	Rio de Janeiro
	Juninho 14'; Luizão 18', 25', 48', 80'			Stadium: Estádio Vasco da Gama (São Januário)

9 May 1999 III	Fluminense	0 – 1	Vasco da Gama	Rio de Janeiro
			61' Luiz Cláudio	Stadium: Estádio Mário Filho (Maracanã)

26 May 1999 IV	Friburguense	0 – 1	Vasco da Gama	Nova Friburgo
			43' Guilherme	Stadium: Estádio Eduardo Guinle

16 May 1999 V	Americano	0 – 1	Vasco da Gama	Campos dos Goytacazes
			82' Felipe	Stadium: Estádio Godofredo Cruz

19 May 1999 VI	Vasco da Gama	8 – 1	Madureira	Rio de Janeiro
	Mauro Galvão 13'; Donizete 17', 77'; Guilherme 29', 90+2'; Alex Oliveira 34', 52'; Chiquinho 86'		84' Derlei	Stadium: Estádio Vasco da Gama (São Januário)

22 May 1999 VII	Vasco da Gama	3 – 3	Olaria	Rio de Janeiro
	Guilherme 16'; Zé Maria 64', 80'		45', 71' Deyves; 55' Zinho	Stadium: Estádio Vasco da Gama (São Januário)

30 May 1999 VIII	Botafogo	1 – 1	Vasco da Gama	Rio de Janeiro
	Zé Carlos 69'		46' Chiquinho	Stadium: Estádio Mário Filho (Maracanã)

6 June 1999 IX	Vasco da Gama	2 – 0	Flamengo	Rio de Janeiro
	Edmundo 64', 90+4'			Stadium: Estádio Mário Filho (Maracanã)

==== Championship phase ====
13 June 1999 Finals: leg I	Flamengo	1 – 1	Vasco da Gama	Rio de Janeiro
	Fábio Baiano 51'		45+2' Edmundo	Stadium: Estádio Mário Filho (Maracanã)

19 June 1999 Finals: leg II	Vasco da Gama	0 – 1 (1 – 2 agg.)	Flamengo	Rio de Janeiro
			77' Rodrigo Mendes	Stadium: Estádio Mário Filho (Maracanã)

=== Copa Mercosur ===
==== Group stage ====
Group D

29 July 1999 I	Peñarol (Uruguay)	v	(Brazil) Vasco da Gama	Montevideo, Uruguay

3 August 1999 II	Vasco da Gama (Brazil)	v	(Uruguay) Nacional	Rio de Janeiro, Brazil

24 August 1999 III	Cerro Porteño (Paraguay)	v	(Brazil) Vasco da Gama	Asunción, Paraguay

31 August 1999 IV	Vasco da Gama (Brazil)	v	(Uruguay) Peñarol	Rio de Janeiro, Brazil

7 September 1999 V	Nacional (Uruguay)	v	(Brazil) Vasco da Gama	Montevideo, Uruguay

5 October 1999 VI	Vasco da Gama (Brazil)	v	(Paraguay) Cerro Porteño	Rio de Janeiro, Brazil

=== Torneio Rio–São Paulo ===
==== Group stage ====
Group A

24 January 1999 I	Palmeiras	v	Vasco da Gama	São Paulo

27 January 1999 II	Fluminense	v	Vasco da Gama	Rio de Janeiro

30 January 1999 III	Santos	v	Vasco da Gama	Santos, São Paulo

6 February 1999 VI	Vasco da Gama	v	Santos	Rio de Janeiro

13 February 1999 IV	Vasco da Gama	v	Palmeiras	Rio de Janeiro

17 February 1999 V	Vasco da Gama	v	Fluminense	Rio de Janeiro

==== Knockout phase ====
21 February 1999 Semifinals: leg I	Vasco da Gama	v	São Paulo	Rio de Janeiro

24 February 1999 Semifinals: leg II	São Paulo	v	Vasco da Gama	São Paulo

28 February 1999 Finals: leg I	Vasco da Gama	v	Santos	Rio de Janeiro

3 March 1999 Finals: leg II	Santos	v	Vasco da Gama	São Paulo

Torneio Rio de Janeiro – São Paulo
champion – 1999
Vasco da Gama

== Statistics ==
=== Squad appearances and goals ===
Last updated on 8 December 1999.

No.	Pos	Nat	Player	Total		Brasileirão Série A league stage		Brasileirão Série A knockout phase		Copa do Brasil		Copa Libertadores		Campeonato do Estado do Rio de Janeiro		Other (Note: Includes appearances in Torneio Rio de Janeiro – São Paulo, Copa Mercosur, 2000 Copa Libertadores play-offs qualifier, Trofeo Ramón de Carranza and friendlies.)	
No.	Pos	Nat	Player	Apps	Goals	Apps	Goals	Apps	Goals	Apps	Goals	Apps	Goals	Apps	Goals	Apps	Goals
Goalkeepers
	GK	(Brazil) BRA	Caetano	1	0	1	0	0	0	0	0	0	0	0	0	0	0
	GK	(Brazil) BRA	Carlos Germano	44	0	20	0	3	0	3	0	1	0	17	0	0	0
	GK	(Brazil) BRA	Márcio	6	0	0	0	0	0	2	0	1	0	3	0	0	0
Defenders
	DF	(Brazil) BRA	Felipe	36	3	6+4	0	3	0	5	1	1	0	17	2	0	0
	DF	(Brazil) BRA	Flavinho	2	0	2	0	0	0	0	0	0	0	0	0	0	0
	DF	(Brazil) BRA	Géder	19	0	11+1	0	0	0	2	0	0	0	5	0	0	0
	DF	(Brazil) BRA	Gilberto	16	2	16	2	0	0	0	0	0	0	0	0	0	0
	DF	(Brazil) BRA	Henrique	12	1	3+6	1	0	0	1	0	0	0	1+1	0	0	0
	DF	(Brazil) BRA	Maricá	17	0	2+5	0	3	0	0+2	0	0	0	1+4	0	0	0
	DF	(Brazil) BRA	Mauro Galvão	32	4	9	0	3	1	4	1	2	0	14	2	0	0
	DF	(Brazil) BRA	Odvan	44	2	19	1	3	0	3	0	2	0	17	1	0	0
	DF	(Brazil) BRA	Paulo César	12	1	8+3	1	0+1	0	0	0	0	0	0	0	0	0
	DF	(Brazil) BRA	Alex Pinho	14	0	0	0	0	0	1+2	0	0+1	0	4+6	0	0	0
	DF	(Brazil) BRA	Zé Maria	26	3	0	0	0	0	5	0	2	0	19	3	0	0
Midfielders
	MF	(Brazil) BRA	Alex Oliveira	40	3	9+5	0	2+1	1	1+3	0	1+1	0	11+6	2	0	0
	MF	(Brazil) BRA	Amaral	18	0	15+1	0	1+1	0	0	0	0	0	0	0	0	0
	MF	(Brazil) BRA	Fabiano Eller	12	0	6+5	0	1	0	0	0	0	0	0	0	0	0
	MF	(Brazil) BRA	Fabrício Carvalho	9	0	0+6	0	2	0	0	0	0	0	0+1	0	0	0
	MF	(Brazil) BRA	Fabrício Eduardo	9	0	0+4	0	0	0	0	0	0+1	0	1+3	0	0	0
	MF	(Brazil) BRA	Hélder	2	0	0	0	0	0	0	0	0	0	2	0	0	0
	MF	(Brazil) BRA	Juninho	38	6	17	2	3	0	4	0	2	0	12	4	0	0
	MF	(Brazil) BRA	Luisinho	1	0	0	0	0	0	0+1	0	0	0	0	0	0	0
	MF	(Brazil) BRA	Nasa	36	0	13+1	0	2+1	0	3	0	2	0	14	0	0	0
	MF	(Brazil) BRA	Paulo Miranda	45	2	15+2	1	0+1	0	5	0	2	0	20	1	0	0
	MF	(Brazil) BRA	Ramon	38	8	17+1	4	1	0	3	2	2	1	12+2	1	0	0
	MF	(Brazil) BRA	Chiquinho	12	4	0	0	0	0	2	1	0	0	5+5	3	0	0
	MF	(Brazil) BRA	Vágner	14	0	0	0	0	0	1	0	0+1	0	4+8	0	0	0
Forwards
	FW	(Brazil) BRA	Cristiano	4	0	0+2	0	0+1	0	0	0	0	0	0+1	0	0	0
	FW	(Brazil) BRA	Donizete	41	11	14+5	6	2+1	3	2	0	2	0	13+2	2	0	0
	FW	(Brazil) BRA	Edmundo	21	16	16	13	1	0	0	0	0	0	4	3	0	0
	FW	(Brazil) BRA	Fabiano Silva	2	0	0+2	0	0	0	0	0	0	0	0	0	0	0
	FW	(Brazil) BRA	Viola	16	4	12+1	2	3	2	0	0	0	0	0	0	0	0
	FW	(Brazil) BRA	Guilherme	16	8	0	0	0	0	3	2	1	1	7+5	5	0	0
	FW	(Brazil) BRA	Luiz Cláudio	8	2	0	0	0	0	0+1	0	0+1	0	2+4	2	0	0
	FW	(Brazil) BRA	Luizão	12	13	0	0	0	0	2	2	1	1	9	10	0	0
	FW	(Brazil) BRA	Mauricinho	5	0	0	0	0	0	1	0	0	0	3+1	0	0	0
	FW	(Brazil) BRA	Vanderlei	1	0	0	0	0	0	1	0	0	0	0	0	0	0
	FW	(Brazil) BRA	Zezinho	17	5	0	0	0	0	1+3	1	0+1	0	3+9	4	0	0
