= Felipe (footballer, born 1977) =

Brazilian footballer and coach

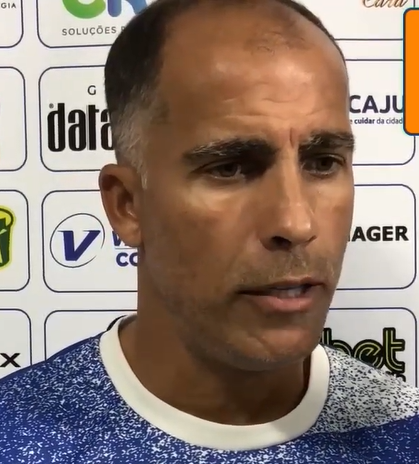
- Felipe in 2022

Personal information
- Full name: Felipe Jorge Loureiro
- Date of birth: 2 September 1977 (age 49)
- Place of birth: Rio de Janeiro, Brazil
- Height: 1.75 m (5 ft 9 in)
- Positions: Midfielder; left-back

Team information
- Current team: Vasco da Gama (technical director)

Youth career
- 1990–1997: Vasco da Gama

Senior career*
Years	Team	Apps	(Gls)
1996–2002	Vasco da Gama	151	(8)
2001	→ Palmeiras (loan)	7	(0)
2001	→ Atlético Mineiro (loan)	7	(0)
2002	Galatasaray	14	(2)
2003–2004	Flamengo	63	(9)
2005	Fluminense	16	(2)
2005–2010	Al Sadd	115	(27)
2010–2012	Vasco da Gama	87	(13)
2013	Fluminense	36	(0)
Total		496	(61)

International career
1999	Brazil U23	1	(0)
1998–2004	Brazil	7	(0)

Managerial career
- 2017: Tigres do Brasil
- 2021–2022: Bangu
- 2022: Confiança
- 2023: Bangu
- 2024: Volta Redonda
- 2024: Vasco da Gama (interim)
- 2025: Vasco da Gama (interim)
- * Club domestic league appearances and goals

Felipe Jorge Loureiro (born 2 September 1977), most known as Felipe and nicknamed Felipe Maestro, is a Brazilian football coach and former player. He is the current technical director of Vasco da Gama.

A left-footed midfielder and left-back, Felipe is known for his playmaking style, that nicknamed him as Maestro, with his excellent ball control, dribbling skills, and vision for orchestrating offensive plays and providing precise passes.

== Club career ==
Born in Rio de Janeiro, Felipe joined Vasco da Gama at the age of six, for their futsal team. He moved to the fields in 1990, aged 12, and made his first team debut on 3 November 1996, starting in a 2–1 win over Botafogo.

Felipe scored his first senior goal on 30 August 1997, in a 3–2 win over Sport Recife. He became a regular starter in that year, being an important unit in Vasco's successful spell.

In May 1999, Vasco sold Felipe to Roma for a fee of US$ 20 million, but manager Fabio Capello refused the player. Roma tried to cancel the deal, but Vasco refused, and Felipe only received clearance to play for Vasco in September. Roma was later deemed to pay US$ 2 million to Vasco on compensation in 2002.

In 2001, after spending a part of the previous season sidelined due to injury, Felipe was separated from the squad of the Cruzmaltino after having altercations with the club's board, after considering himself underpaid. He was subsequently loaned to Palmeiras to play in the 2001 FIFA Club World Championship, but was released in July, a few months after the tournament was cancelled.

On 31 October 2001, Felipe moved to Atlético Mineiro on loan for the remainder of the year. He returned to Vasco in January 2002, where he again became a starter.

In 2002, Felipe moved abroad and joined Turkish side Galatasaray, but rescinded his contract in November of that year, after featuring rarely. He signed for Flamengo on 16 January 2003, after agreeing to a two-year deal.

Felipe was an undisputed starter for Fla in the 2004 campaign, being often deployed as a right winger; despite winning the 2004 Campeonato Carioca, the club narrowly avoided relegation in the 2004 Série A. On 10 January 2005, he was presented at Fluminense.

Felipe struggled with injuries at Flu, being also suspended for 120 days after assaulting a player from Campinense during a Copa do Brasil match. In October, after missing out two training days in the week and disagreeing with the subsequent fine, he had his contract rescinded.

On 2 November 2005, Felipe moved to Al Sadd in Qatar. He spent five seasons in Middle East, winning several collective and individual accolades.

On 9 June 2010, Felipe agreed to return to his first club Vasco, after his contract with Al Sadd was due to expire. An immediate starter, he had altercations with director René Simões in the latter months of 2012, and had his contract rescinded by the director on 21 December of that year.

On 19 January 2013, Felipe returned to Fluminense. Despite being regularly used, he was unable to establish himself as a starter, and left the club on 17 December.

On 15 March 2014, after spending three months without a club, Felipe announced his retirement at the age of 36.

== International career ==
Felipe made his full international debut with Brazil on 23 September 1998, in a friendly against Yugoslavia. He featured in a further six matches for the national side, being called up to the 2004 Copa América and winning the competition.

== Coaching career ==
On 4 July 2016, Felipe was named head coach of Tigres do Brasil for the upcoming season, having former Vasco teammate Pedrinho as his assistant. The duo resigned the following 11 February, after a 4–0 loss to Cabofriense.

On 6 February 2019, Felipe joined Ponte Preta as a football coordinator. He left the club on 27 November, and spent more than a year unemployed before returning to coaching duties on 27 April 2021, after being named at the helm of Bangu.

On 14 April 2022, Felipe left Bangu to take over Série C side Confiança. He resigned on 18 June, and returned to his previous club Bangu on 21 October.

Bangu announced the departure of Felipe on 28 March 2023, after not renewing his contract. On 23 October, he agreed to become Volta Redonda's head coach for the ensuing season, but was dismissed on 15 February 2024.

On 3 June 2024, Felipe returned to Vasco as a technical director. On 24 November, he was named interim head coach of the club for the remaining three matches of the season, replacing Rafael Paiva.

Back to his coordinator role ahead of the 2025 season, Felipe was again named interim on 27 April of that year, after Fábio Carille was sacked.

== Career statistics ==
=== Club ===
Club	Season	League			State League		Cup		Continental		Other		Total	
Club	Season	Division	Apps	Goals	Apps	Goals	Apps	Goals	Apps	Goals	Apps	Goals	Apps	Goals
Vasco da Gama	1996	Série A	5	0	—		—		—		—		5	0
Vasco da Gama	1997	Série A	28	1	24	0	3	0	9 (Note: Appearance(s) in Supercopa Libertadores)	0	2 (Note: Appearance(s) in Torneio Rio – São Paulo)	0	66	1
Vasco da Gama	1998	Série A	19	1	9	1	7	1	14 (Note: Appearance(s) in Copa Libertadores)	0	8 (Note: Five appearances in Torneio Rio – São Paulo, two appearances and one goal in Copa Interamericana, one appearance in Intercontinental Cup)	1	57	4
Vasco da Gama	1999	Série A	13	0	18	2	5	1	1	0	9	1	46	4
Vasco da Gama	2000	Série A	10	1	19	1	5	0	4 (Note: Appearance(s) in Copa Mercosur)	0	8 (Note: Four appearances in Torneio Rio – São Paulo, four appearances and one goal in FIFA Club World Championship)	1	46	3
Vasco da Gama	2001	Série A	0	0	0	0	0	0	0	0	1	0	1	0
Vasco da Gama	2002	Série A	0	0	6	1	7	3	—		14	2	27	6
Vasco da Gama	Total		75	3	76	5	27	5	28	0	42	5	248	18
Palmeiras (loan)	2001	Série A	0	0	7	0	—		12	0	—		19	0
Atlético Mineiro (loan)	2001	Série A	7	0	—		—		—		—		7	0
Galatasaray	2002–03	Süper Lig	14	2	—		0	0	5 (Note: Appearance(s) in UEFA Champions League)	0	—		19	2
Flamengo	2003	Série A	18	2	9	1	10	2	—		—		37	5
Flamengo	2004	Série A	25	2	11	4	11	0	2 (Note: Appearance(s) in Copa Sudamericana)	0	—		49	6
Flamengo	Total		43	4	20	5	21	2	2	0	—		86	11
Fluminense	2005	Série A	8	0	8	2	1	1	2	0	—		19	3
Al Sadd	2005–06	Qatar Stars League	?	1	—		—		1 (Note: Appearance(s) in AFC Champions League)	0	—		?	1+
Al Sadd	2006–07	Qatar Stars League	?	6	—		?	?	1	0	—		?	6+
Al Sadd	2007–08	Qatar Stars League	?	12	—		?	?	4	1	—		?	13+
Al Sadd	2008–09	Qatar Stars League	25	4	—		?	?	—		—		25+	4+
Al Sadd	2009–10	Qatar Stars League	20	4	—		?	?	6	1	—		26+	5+
Al Sadd	Total		115	27	—		?	?	12	2	—		127+	29+
Vasco da Gama	2010	Série A	18	1	—		—		—		—		18	1
Vasco da Gama	2011	Série A	20	4	15	3	10	0	2	0	—		47	7
Vasco da Gama	2012	Série A	23	2	11	3	—		9	0	—		43	5
Vasco da Gama	Total		61	7	26	6	10	0	11	0	—		108	13
Fluminense	2013	Série A	25	0	11	0	2	0	4	0	—		42	0
Career total			348	43	148	18	68	8	76	2	42	5	675	76

=== International ===
Appearances and goals by national team and year
National team	Year	Apps	Goals
Brazil	1998	1	0
Brazil	1999	3	0
Brazil	2004	3	0
Total		7	0

== Coaching statistics ==
As of match played 10 May 2025

Coaching record by team and tenure
Team	Nat	From	To	Record								Ref
Team	Nat	From	To	G	W	D	L	GF	GA	GD	Win %	Ref
Tigres do Brasil	(Brazil)	4 July 2016	11 February 2017	7	1	3	3	9	14	−5	14.29	
Bangu	(Brazil)	27 April 2021	14 April 2022	29	8	9	12	22	36	−14	27.59	
Confiança	(Brazil)	14 April 2022	18 June 2022	9	2	3	4	7	11	−4	22.22	
Bangu	(Brazil)	21 October 2022	28 March 2023	11	3	3	5	6	17	−11	27.27	
Volta Redonda	(Brazil)	23 October 2023	15 February 2024	8	2	2	4	9	14	−5	25.00	
Vasco da Gama (interim)	(Brazil)	24 November 2024	8 December 2024	3	2	1	0	6	3	+3	66.67	
Vasco da Gama (interim)	(Brazil)	27 April 2025	10 May 2025	4	0	1	3	3	8	−5	0.00	
Total				71	18	22	31	62	103	−41	25.35	—

== Honours ==
Vasco da Gama

- Campeonato Brasileiro Série A: 1997, 2000
- Copa Libertadores: 1998
- Campeonato Carioca: 1998
- Torneio Rio – São Paulo: 1999
- Copa Mercosur: 2000
- Copa do Brasil: 2011

Flamengo

- Campeonato Carioca: 2004

Fluminense

- Campeonato Carioca: 2005

Al Sadd

- Qatar Stars League: 2005–06, 2006–07
- Emir of Qatar Cup: 2006–07
- Qatar Cup: 2006, 2007, 2008
- Sheikh Jassim Cup: 2006

Brazil

- Copa América: 2004

Individual

- Copa do Brasil Player of Year: 2004, 2011
- Campeonato Carioca Player of Year: 2004
- Campeonato Carioca Midfielder of Year: 2004, 2011, 2012
- South American Team of the Year: 1998
