= Fabrício Eduardo =

Brazilian footballer

Personal information
- Full name: Fabrício Eduardo da Silva Alves
- Date of birth: 13 August 1976 (age 50)
- Place of birth: Campos dos Goytacazes, Brazil
- Height: 1.77 m (5 ft 10 in)
- Position: Midfielder

Youth career
- 1991–1994: Vasco da Gama

Senior career*
Years	Team	Apps	(Gls)
1994–1999	Vasco da Gama		
2000–2001	Náutico		
2002–2003	Libertad		
2004	America-RJ		
2005	Americano		
2006	Remo		
2006	Treze		
2007	Casimiro de Abreu		

International career
1993	Brazil U17		
- * Club domestic league appearances and goals as of 24 January 2024

Fabrício Eduardo da Silva Alves (born 12 August 1976), better known as Fabrício Eduardo, is a Brazilian former professional footballer who played as a midfielder.

== Career ==
Fabricio Eduardo represented the Brazilian team in the South American U-17 Championship in 1993. At Vasco da Gama, he participated in winning several titles, especially the 1998 Copa Libertadores and the Brazilian championship in 1997. He also played for Náutico, Libertad-PAR, America, Americano, Remo, Treze and Casimiro de Abreu. After retiring, he became a CD dealer in Rio de Janeiro. In 2011 he ended up arrested in an operation to combat piracy.

== Honours ==
Vasco da Gama

- Copa Libertadores: 1998
- Campeonato Brasileiro: 1997
- Campeonato Carioca: 1994, 1998
- Taça Guanabara: 1994, 1998
- Taça Rio: 1999
- Torneio Rio-São Paulo: 1999
