= Richardson (footballer, born 1976) =

Brazilian footballer

Personal information
- Full name: Richardson Oliveira dos Santos
- Date of birth: 30 January 1976 (age 50)
- Place of birth: Rio de Janeiro, Brazil
- Height: 1.78 m (5 ft 10 in)
- Position: Midfielder

Youth career
- –1994: Vasco da Gama

Senior career*
Years	Team	Apps	(Gls)
1994–1998	Vasco da Gama		
1997	→ América-RN (loan)		
1999	Matonense		
1999–2000	León		
2000	Paysandu		
2001	Etti Jundiaí		
2001	Mogi Mirim		
2002–2003	Marítimo		
2003	Mirandela		
2004	Chaves		
2005	América-SP		
2005	Metropolitano		
2005	Joinville		
2006	Metropolitano		
2006	Joinville		
2007–2008	Ulbra-RS		
2009–2011	CRAC		
- * Club domestic league appearances and goals as of 26 January 2024

Richardson Oliveira dos Santos (born 30 January 1976), simply known as Richardson, is a Brazilian former professional footballer who played as a midfielder.

== Career ==
A graduate of Vasco's youth categories, Richardson was part of the Copa Libertadores champion squad in 1998. He was also state champion with Paysandu, and Série C with Paulista de Jundiaí. Also in Mexican and Portuguese football. The player Richarlison was named after the athlete.

== Honours ==
=== Player ===
Vasco da Gama

- Copa Libertadores: 1998
- Campeonato Carioca: 1998
- Taça Guanabara: 1998

Paysandu

- Campeonato Paraense: 2000

Paulista

- Campeonato Paulista Série A2: 2001
- Campeonato Brasileiro Série C: 2001
