= Brener (footballer) =

Brazilian footballer (born 1975)

Personal information
- Full name: Brener Antunes das Chagas
- Date of birth: 27 November 1975 (age 50)
- Place of birth: Itaboraí, Brazil
- Height: 1.65 m (5 ft 5 in)
- Position: Midfielder

Youth career
- Vasco da Gama

Senior career*
Years	Team	Apps	(Gls)
1995–1998	Vasco da Gama	90	(12)
1999	Rio Branco		
2000	FC Uralan Elista	8	(1)
2001	Treze		
2002	Inter de Limeira		
2002	Guarani	20	(2)
2003	Avaí	11	(4)
2004	Inter de Limeira		
2005	União Barbarense		
2005–2006	Macaé		
2007	Casimiro de Abreu		
2008	Shahzan Muda		
2009	Ríver		
- * Club domestic league appearances and goals

Brener Antunes das Chagas or simply Brener (born 27 November 1975) is a former Brazilian football player.

== Honours ==
Vasco da Gama

- Brasileirão champion: 1997
- Campeonato Carioca champion: 1998
- Copa Libertadores winner: 1998

== See also ==
- Moshe Brener (born 1971), Israeli basketball player
