= Casimiro de Abreu (disambiguation) =

Casimiro de Abreu may refer to:

- Casimiro de Abreu, a Brazilian writer and poet.
- Casimiro de Abreu, Rio de Janeiro, a Brazilian municipality.
- Casimiro de Abreu Esporte Clube, a Brazilian football club.
