= Caetano (footballer, born 1972) =

Brazilian footballer

Personal information
- Full name: José Caetano Mendes
- Date of birth: 10 August 1972 (age 54)
- Place of birth: Porto Alegre, Brazil
- Height: 1.89 m (6 ft 2 in)
- Position: Goalkeeper

Youth career
- 1991–1992: Vasco da Gama

Senior career*
Years	Team	Apps	(Gls)
1992–1999	Vasco da Gama		
2000	Náutico		
2001	Veranópolis		
2001	Bonsucesso		
2002	Mamoré		
2003	Flamengo-SP		
2004	Teresópolis		
2004	América-MG		
2005	Flamengo-SP		
2006	América-MG		
2007	Santa Cruz-RS		
2008	Serra		
2008	Bonsucesso		
2008–2010	Parseh Tehran		
- * Club domestic league appearances and goals as of 21 January 2024

José Caetano Mendes (born 10 August 1972), simply known as Caetano, is a Brazilian former professional footballer who played as a goalkeeper.

== Career ==
Formed in Vasco da Gama's youth categories, Caetano was, for most of the period, a substitute for Carlos Germano and Márcio Cazorla. Among his 78 appearances for the club, his most memorable match was on 6 June 1978, against Grêmio in São Januário. He played for other clubs, such as Mamoré in the 2002 Copa Sul-Minas, but without ever establishing himself. He ended his career at Parseh Tehran in 2010.

== Honours ==
Vasco da Gama

- Copa Libertadores: 1998
- Campeonato Brasileiro: 1997
- Campeonato Carioca: 1992, 1993, 1994, 1998
- Taça Guanabara: 1992, 1994, 1998
- Taça Rio: 1992, 1993, 1999
- Torneio Rio-São Paulo: 1999
- Copa São Paulo de Futebol Jr.: 1992
- Ciutat de Barcelona Trophy: 1993
- Trofeo Ciudad de Zaragoza: 1993
- Torneio João Havelange: 1993
