= Hélcio =

Helcio is a given name. It may refer to:

- Hélcio (footballer, born 1903) (1903–?), Brazilian footballer Hélcio de Paiva
- Hélcio (footballer, born 1969), Brazilian footballer Hélcio Roberto Alisk
- Hélcio da Silva (born 1928), Brazilian pole vaulter
- Hélcio Milito (1931–2014), Brazilian jazz musician and drummer
