= Nélson (footballer, born 1972) =

Brazilian footballer

Personal information
- Full name: Nélson Domingues de Araújo
- Date of birth: 22 July 1972 (age 54)
- Place of birth: Rio de Janeiro, Brazil
- Height: 1.86 m (6 ft 1 in)
- Position: Midfielder

Youth career
- –1992: Botafogo

Senior career*
Years	Team	Apps	(Gls)
1992–1995	Botafogo		
1995–1998	Vasco da Gama		
1999	Vitória		
2000	Santa Cruz		
2000	America-RJ		
2001	Olaria		
2002	America-RJ		
2002–2003	Americano		
2003	Arraial do Cabo		
2004	Bonsucesso		
2005	Macaé		
2006	Estácio de Sá		
2007	São Cristóvão		
2008	Barra Mansa		
- * Club domestic league appearances and goals as of 25 January 2024

Nélson Domingues de Araújo (born 22 July 1972), better known as Nélson, is a Brazilian former professional footballer who played as a midfielder.

== Career ==
A midfielder characterized by his vigorous play, Nélson was successful playing for Botafogo FR and Vasco da Gama during the 90s. He participated in winning the Brazilian title in 1997 and the 1998 Copa Libertadores. Currently, he works as an app driver in Rio de Janeiro.

== Honours ==
Botafogo

- Copa CONMEBOL: 1993

Vasco da Gama

- Copa Libertadores: 1998
- Campeonato Brasileiro: 1997
- Campeonato Carioca: 1998
- Taça Guanabara: 1998
- Taça Rio: 1999
- Torneio Rio-São Paulo: 1999
