= Sorato (footballer) =

Brazilian footballer

Personal information
- Full name: Aguinaldo Luiz Sorato
- Date of birth: 8 April 1969 (age 57)
- Place of birth: Araras, Brazil
- Height: 1.80 m (5 ft 11 in)
- Position: Striker

Youth career
- Vasco da Gama

Senior career*
Years	Team	Apps	(Gls)
1988–1992	Vasco da Gama	133	(44)
1992–1994	Palmeiras	25	(2)
1994	Cruzeiro	8	(0)
1995	Juventude		(2)
1995	Santa Cruz		(5)
1996	Bangu	22	(10)
1996–1997	Botafogo	33	(10)
1997–1998	Vasco da Gama	9	(2)
1999	Comercial-SP		(6)
1999	Gama	18	(5)
2000	America-RJ	17	(12)
2000	América Mineiro	11	(0)
2001	America-RJ		(3)
2001	Etti Jundiaí	18	(6)
2002	Madureira		(5)
2002	Videoton	19	(3)
2003	Madureira	9	(7)
2003	Fluminense	22	(6)
2004	Marília	16	(6)
2004	Atlético Sorocaba		(1)
2005	Madureira	11	(6)
2005	Macaé		
2006	Cabofriense	14	(8)
2006	Bahia		(23)
2007	Ituano	19	(9)
2007	Vitória	24	(8)
2008	Atlético Goianiense	12	(1)
2008	Bacabal		
2008	CFZ do Rio	13	(2)
2009	Tigres do Brasil	12	(2)

Managerial career
- 2010: Tigres do Brasil
- 2012–2014: Vasco da Gama U20
- 2015–2016: Doze
- 2017: Estrela do Norte
- 2018: Maricá
- * Club domestic league appearances and goals

Aguinaldo Luiz Sorato (born 8 April 1969), commonly known as Sorato, is a Brazilian football coach and former player who played as a striker. He spent seven years of his professional career with Vasco da Gama; they won the 1998 Copa Libertadores.

== Honours ==
Vasco da Gama

- Copa Libertadores: 1998
- Campeonato Brasileiro Série A: 1989, 1997
- Campeonato Carioca: 1988, 1992, 1998

Palmeiras

- Campeonato Brasileiro Série A: 1993
- Campeonato Paulista: 1993, 1994
- Torneio Rio-São Paulo: 1993

Botafogo

- Campeonato Carioca: 1997

Etti Jundiaí

- Campeonato Brasileiro Série C: 2001
- Campeonato Paulista Série A2: 2001

Vitória

- Campeonato Baiano: 2007

Individual

- Campeonato Brasileiro Série C top scorer: 2006
