= Luizão (footballer, born 1975) =

Brazilian footballer (born 1975)

Personal information
- Full name: Luiz Carlos Bombonato Goulart
- Date of birth: 14 November 1975 (age 50)
- Place of birth: Rubinéia, São Paulo, Brazil
- Height: 1.78 m (5 ft 10 in)
- Position: Forward

Senior career*
Years	Team	Apps	(Gls)
1993	Guarani	1	(3)
1993	Paraná	6	(0)
1994–1995	Guarani	37	(16)
1995–1997	Palmeiras	46	(23)
1997–1998	Deportivo La Coruña	14	(4)
1998–1999	Vasco da Gama	16	(8)
1999–2002	Corinthians	109	(76)
2002	Grêmio	8	(7)
2002–2004	Hertha BSC	26	(4)
2004	Botafogo	15	(9)
2005	São Paulo	5	(2)
2005	Nagoya Grampus	6	(4)
2005–2006	Santos	5	(0)
2006–2007	Flamengo	21	(11)
2007–2008	São Caetano	5	(2)
Total		237	(108)

International career
1996–2002	Brazil	12	(4)
Medal record
Men's football
Representing Brazil
FIFA World Cup
Winner	2002 Korea/Japan
Summer Olympics
Bronze medal – third place	1996 Atlanta	Team
- * Club domestic league appearances and goals

Luiz Carlos Bombonato Goulart, known as Luizão (born 14 November 1975), is a Brazilian football pundit and retired forward.

He was capped 12 times for Brazil, scoring two goals in the last match of the 2002 FIFA World Cup qualification against Venezuela, a 3–0 victory overall. This performance confirmed Luizão as part of the World Cup-winning squad coached by Luiz Felipe Scolari.

== Career ==
Luizão was born in Rubinéia. He is one of the few players, alongside Antônio Carlos, Müller, Neto and César Sampaio that played for the four major clubs of São Paulo: Santos Futebol Clube, Sociedade Esportiva Palmeiras, Sport Club Corinthians Paulista and São Paulo Futebol Clube. He managed to be the top goalscorer of at least one tournament for each one of them, except for Santos, where he underachieved.

Luizão bloomed at Guarani Futebol Clube, playing alongside close friends Djalminha and Márcio Amoroso. Luizão (with Djalminha) was then transferred to Palmeiras, where he won many titles, including a São Paulo State Championship under the command of Vanderlei Luxemburgo, where he scored 22 of 102 squad goals.

He then followed Djalminha to La Liga's Deportivo de La Coruña, but unlike the talented playmaker, Luizão failed to settle. He returned to Brazil to Club de Regatas Vasco da Gama. In July 2002, he had another unsuccessful abroad stint, with German Bundesliga side Hertha BSC, leaving the side in January 2004.

The 35-year-old forward (as of 2010), who was a free agent after terminating his contract with São Caetano. He came to sign with other teams as Guaratinguetá, but has not played in any match for them.

== Career statistics ==
=== Club ===
Appearances and goals by club, season and competition
Club	Season	League			State league		Cup		Continental		Other		Total	
Club	Season	Division	Apps	Goals	Apps	Goals	Apps	Goals	Apps	Goals	Apps	Goals	Apps	Goals
Guarani	1992	Série A	0	0	4	0	–		–		–		4	0
Paraná	1993	Série A	6	0	–		–		–		–		6	0
Guarani	1993	Série A	0	0	30	8	–		–		5	0	35	8
Guarani	1994	Série A	27	9	9	1	–		–		–		36	10
Guarani	1995	Série A	10	8	21	4	–		2	0	–		33	12
Guarani	Total		37	17	60	13	0	0	2	0	5	0	104	30
Palmeiras	1996	Série A	22	10	27	22	9	7	2	1	–		60	40
Palmeiras	1997	Série A	0	0	19	13	3	0	0	0	4	0	26	13
Palmeiras	Total		22	10	46	35	12	7	2	1	4	0	86	53
Deportivo La Coruña	1997–98	La Liga	13	4	–		–		2	0	–		15	4
Vasco da Gama	1998	Série A	14	8	1	0	8	6	15	7	16	3	54	24
Vasco da Gama	1999	Série A	0	0	9	10	2	2	1	0	5	1	17	13
Vasco da Gama	Total		14	8	10	10	10	8	16	7	21	4	71	37
Corinthians Paulista	1999	Série A	25	21	–		–		9	3	1	0	35	24
Corinthians Paulista	2000	Série A	10	3	13	6	0	0	14	16	4	1	41	26
Corinthians Paulista	2001	Série A	7	5	10	8	1	1	5	3	4	5	27	22
Corinthians Paulista	Total		42	29	23	14	1	1	28	22	9	6	103	72
Grêmio	2002	Série A	0	0	–		–		3	1	2	0	5	1
Hertha BSC	2002–03	Bundesliga	19	2	–		1	0	6	1	–		26	3
Hertha BSC	2003–04	Bundesliga	7	2	–		2	1	1	1	–		10	4
Hertha BSC	Total		26	4	–		3	1	7	2	–		36	7
Botafogo	2004	Série A	15	9	–		–		–		–		15	9
São Paulo	2005	Série A	5	2	10	4	–		13	5	–		28	11
Nagoya Grampus Eight	2005	J1 League	6	4	–		–		–		–		6	4
Santos	2005	Série A	5	0	–		–		–		–		5	0
Flamengo	2006	Série A	11	1	6	6	7	3	–		–		24	10
São Caetano	2007	Série B	5	2	–		–		–		–		5	2
Career total			207	90	159	82	33	20	73	38	41	10	513	240

=== International ===
Appearances and goals by national team and year
National team	Year	Apps	Goals
Brazil	1996	1	1
Brazil	1997	0	0
Brazil	1998	0	0
Brazil	1999	0	0
Brazil	2000	1	0
Brazil	2001	3	2
Brazil	2002	7	1
Total		12	4

== Honours ==
=== Club ===
Paraná

- Campeonato Paranaense: 1993

Palmeiras

- Campeonato Paulista: 1996

Vasco da Gama

- Campeonato Carioca: 1998
- Copa Libertadores: 1998
- Torneio Rio-São Paulo: 1999

Corinthians

- Campeonato Brasileiro Série A: 1999
- Campeonato Paulista: 2001
- FIFA Club World Cup: 2000

São Paulo

- Campeonato Paulista: 2005
- Copa Libertadores: 2005

Flamengo

- Copa do Brasil: 2006

=== International ===
Brazil

- FIFA World Cup: 2002

=== Individual ===
- Bola de Prata (Brazilian Silver Ball): 1994
- Copa do Brasil Top Scorer: 1996
- Copa Libertadores Top Scorer: 2000
