= Pedrinho (footballer, born 1977) =

Brazilian footballer and president

61th President of CR Vasco da Gama
- Incumbent
- Assumed office January 2024
- Preceded by: Jorge Salgado

Personal details
- Born: Pedro Paulo de Oliveira; 29 June 1977 (age 49) Rio de Janeiro, Brazil
- Height: 1.70 m (5 ft 7 in)
- Occupation: President of Vasco da Gama, Footballer (formerly)
Association football career
- Positions: Left winger; attacking midfielder; second striker
Youth career
- 1989–1997: Vasco da Gama
Senior career*
Years	Team	Apps	(Gls)
1995–2001	Vasco da Gama	57	(12)
2001–2005	Palmeiras	92	(21)
2005–2006	Ittihad		
2006	Fluminense	9	(1)
2007	Santos	29	(10)
2008	Al Ain		
2008	Vasco da Gama		
2009	Figueirense		
2012	Olaria		
2013	Vasco da Gama		
International career
2004	Brazil	1	(0)
Medal record
Men's football
- * Club domestic league appearances and goals

Pedro Paulo de Oliveira (Rio de Janeiro, 29 June 1977), known as Pedrinho, is a former Brazilian footballer who played as a midfielder. In 2014, he became Band's sports commentator. He worked for TV Globo between 2019 and 2023, when he decided to leave to run for the presidency of Vasco da Gama. In January 2024, he took office as the president of Vasco da Gama, with a term set to last until 2026.

In 2022 and 2023, Pedrinho was elected the best sports commentator in a UOL survey that interviewed players who played in Brazilian football.

== Playing career ==
=== Club career ===
Pedrinho began his journey at Vasco da Gama, joining the club's futsal team at the age of six. He was promoted to the main squad in 1995 and experienced the pinnacle of his career during Vasco's victorious campaign in the 1998 Copa Libertadores. In 2001, he transferred to Palmeiras, a move influenced by a debt Vasco owed to Palmeiras from the acquisition of forward Euller.

At the end of 2005 Pedrinho was signed by Ittihad Club of Saudi Arabia, aiming to compete in the FIFA Club World Cup. However, he was excluded from the tournament due to late registration. He returned to Brazil in 2006, joining Fluminense but was released by the end of the year.

On 26 January 2007 Pedrinho was signed by Santos, where he played in that year's Copa Libertadores campaign.

In early 2008 Pedrinho signed a five-month contract with Al Ain in the United Arab Emirates. Later that year, in September, he returned to Brazil and rejoined Vasco da Gama, signing on for the rest of the season.

After his contract expired, he joined Figueirense. On 6 August 2009, at the age of 32, Pedrinho announced his retirement from professional football, largely due to recurring injuries that plagued his career.

After two years away from the field, in October 2011 Pedrinho signed with Olaria for the 2012 Campeonato Carioca. He played his final match on 13 January 2013, in a commemorative friendly where Vasco da Gama defeated Ajax 1–0.

=== International career ===
Following Vasco's triumph in the 1998 Copa Libertadores, Pedrinho earned his first call-up to the Brazilian national team. In 2002, he played his only match for Brazil in a friendly against Haiti.

=== Injury record ===
Throughout his career, Pedrinho struggled with frequent injuries. He revealed that there was a point in his career when he began to believe his issues might be psychological, but physiotherapist Nilton Petroni identified a hip imbalance as the root cause. Their collaboration allowed Pedrinho to achieve a milestone in 2007 with Santos, managing over 60 games in a single season.

== Post-playing career ==
=== Commentator career ===
On January 12, 2014, he was hired to be a commentator on the Jogo Aberto Rio program on Band, alongside Djalminha and Larissa Erthal. On March 29, 2015, due to a financial crisis at Band, 50 professionals were summarily dismissed, including Pedrinho.

On August 29, 2019, he was hired as a sports commentator for Grupo Globo, working on the SporTV and TV Globo. On September 14, 2023, Pedrinho announced his departure from the Grupo Globo.

=== President of Vasco da Gama ===
On 23 September, 2023, Pedrinho announced his candidacy for president of Vasco da Gama for the 2024–2026 term. On 11 November 2023, he won the election, defeating Leven Siano to become the club's president.

== Honours ==
Vasco da Gama

- Campeonato Brasileiro Série A: 1997, 2000
- Copa Libertadores: 1998
- Campeonato Carioca: 1998
- Torneio Rio-São Paulo: 1999
- Copa Mercosur: 2000

Palmeiras

- Campeonato Brasileiro Série B: 2003

Santos

- Campeonato Paulista: 2007
