= 2004 Campeonato Carioca =

Campeonato Carioca
- Season: 2004
- Champions: Flamengo
- Relegated: Bangu
- Copa do Brasil: Americano; América; Friburguense
- Série C: Americano; América; Friburguense; Portuguesa
- Matches played: 74
- Goals scored: 206 (2.78 per match)
- Top goalscorer: Valdir (Vasco da Gama) - 14 goals
- Biggest home win: Flamengo 5-1 Madureira (February 11, 2004); Vasco da Gama 5-1 Cabofriense (March 4, 2004); América 5-1 Bangu (March 21, 2004)
- Biggest away win: Fluminense 0-4 Vasco da Gama (March 7, 2004)
- Highest scoring: Flamengo 4–3 Fluminense (February 1, 2004); América 4-3 Flamengo (February 8, 2004)

The 2004 edition of the Campeonato Carioca kicked off on January 24 and ended on April 18, 2004. It is the official tournament organized by FFERJ (Federação de Futebol do Estado do Rio de Janeiro, or Rio de Janeiro State Football Federation. Only clubs based in the Rio de Janeiro State are allowed to play. Twelve teams contested this edition. Flamengo won the title for the 28th time. Bangu was relegated, ending a string of 90 consecutive participations in the Carioca championship.

== System ==
The tournament was divided in two stages:

- Taça Guanabara: The 12 clubs were divided into two groups. teams from each group played in single round-robin format against the others in their group. Top two teams in each group advanced to semifinal and then, to the final, played in a single match.
- Taça Rio: The teams from one group play against teams from the other group once. Top two teams in each group qualify to semifinal and final, to be played in a single match.
- Finals: Taça Guanabara and Taça Rio winners play twice at Maracanã Stadium. If the same club wins both stages, they will be declared champions and the final won't be necessary.

== Championship ==
=== Taça Guanabara ===
==== Group A ====
Pos	Team	Pld	W	D	L	GF	GA	GD	Pts	Qualification or relegation
1	Vasco da Gama	5	3	2	0	8	2	+6	11	Qualified to Semifinals
2	Americano	5	3	2	0	4	1	+3	11	Qualified to Semifinals
3	Botafogo	5	3	1	1	9	5	+4	10	
4	Portuguesa	5	1	1	3	2	5	−3	4	
5	Bangu	5	1	0	4	4	8	−4	3	
6	Olaria	5	0	2	3	0	6	−6	2	

Updated to match(es) played on February 11, 2004. Source: RSSSF.com
Rules for classification: 1) points; 2) wins; 3) goal difference; 4) number of goals scored.

==== Group B ====
Pos	Team	Pld	W	D	L	GF	GA	GD	Pts	Qualification or relegation
1	Fluminense	5	4	0	1	15	6	+9	12	Qualified to Semifinals
2	Flamengo	5	3	1	1	15	9	+6	10	Qualified to Semifinals
3	Friburguense	5	2	2	1	3	4	−1	8	
4	América	5	2	0	3	8	12	−4	6	
5	Madureira	5	1	1	3	5	10	−5	4	
6	Cabofriense	5	1	0	4	4	9	−5	3	

Updated to match(es) played on February 11, 2004. Source: RSSSF.com
Rules for classification: 1) points; 2) wins; 3) goal difference; 4) number of goals scored.

==== Semifinals ====
Team 1	Score	Team 2
Fluminense	2–1	Americano
Vasco da Gama	0–2	Flamengo

==== Finals ====
Team 1	Score	Team 2
Fluminense	2–3	Flamengo

=== Taça Rio ===
==== Group A ====
Pos	Team	Pld	W	D	L	GF	GA	GD	Pts	Qualification or relegation
1	Vasco da Gama	6	5	0	1	16	6	+10	15	Qualified to Semifinals
2	Americano	6	3	3	0	10	7	+3	12	Qualified to Semifinals
3	Botafogo	6	3	2	1	10	7	+3	11	
4	Portuguesa	6	1	3	2	9	10	−1	6	
5	Olaria	6	1	3	2	4	5	−1	6	
6	Bangu	6	0	2	4	5	14	−9	2	

Updated to match(es) played on March 21, 2004. Source: RSSSF.com
Rules for classification: 1) points; 2) wins; 3) goal difference; 4) number of goals scored.

==== Group B ====
Pos	Team	Pld	W	D	L	GF	GA	GD	Pts	Qualification or relegation
1	Fluminense	6	3	2	1	8	7	+1	11	Qualified to Semifinals
2	Friburguense	6	3	1	2	7	6	+1	10	Qualified to Semifinals
3	Cabofriense	6	1	4	1	8	10	−2	7	
4	América	6	1	2	3	12	12	0	5	
5	Flamengo	6	1	2	3	4	6	−2	5	
6	Madureira	6	1	2	3	10	13	−3	5	

Updated to match(es) played on March 21, 2004. Source: RSSSF.com
Rules for classification: 1) points; 2) wins; 3) goal difference; 4) number of goals scored.

==== Semifinals ====
Team 1	Score	Team 2
Fluminense	3–1	Americano
Vasco da Gama	1–1 (5-4 pen.)	Friburguense

==== Finals ====
Team 1	Score	Team 2
Vasco da Gama	2–1	Fluminense

=== Championship finals ===
Team 1	Agg.	Team 2	1st leg	2nd leg
Flamengo	5–2	Vasco da Gama	2–1	3–1

== Aggregate table ==
Pos	Team	Pld	W	D	L	GF	GA	GD	Pts	Qualification or relegation
1	Vasco da Gama	11	8	2	1	24	8	+16	26	
2	Fluminense	11	7	2	2	23	13	+10	23	
3	Americano	11	6	5	0	14	8	+6	23	2005 Copa do Brasil and Série C
4	Botafogo	11	6	3	2	19	12	+7	21	
5	Friburguense	11	5	3	3	10	10	0	18	2005 Copa do Brasil and Série C
6	Flamengo	11	4	3	4	19	15	+4	15	
7	América	11	3	2	6	20	24	−4	11	2005 Copa do Brasil and Série C
8	Portuguesa	11	2	4	5	11	17	−6	10	Série C
9	Cabofriense	11	2	4	5	12	19	−7	10	
10	Madureira	11	2	3	6	15	23	−8	9	
11	Olaria	11	1	5	5	4	11	−7	8	
12	Bangu	11	1	2	8	9	22	−13	5	Relegated

Updated to match(es) played on March 21, 2004. Source: RSSSF.com
Rules for classification: 1) points; 2) wins; 3) goal difference; 4) number of goals scored.
