= Ramon Menezes =

Brazilian football manager (born 1972)

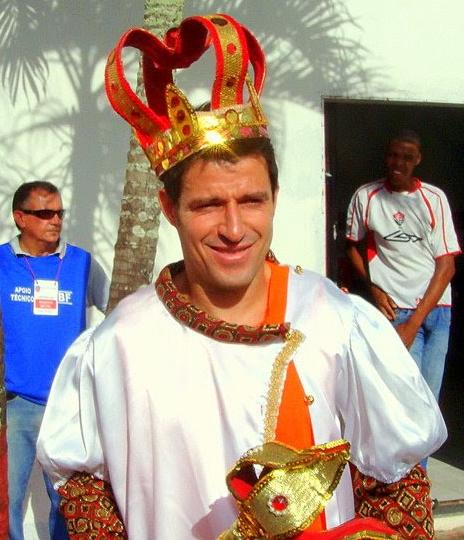

Personal information
- Full name: Ramon Menezes Hubner
- Date of birth: 30 June 1972 (age 54)
- Place of birth: Contagem, Minas Gerais, Brazil
- Height: 1.70 m (5 ft 7 in)
- Position: Attacking midfielder

Team information
- Current team: Primavera (head coach)

Youth career
- 1983–1988: Cruzeiro

Senior career*
Years	Team	Apps	(Gls)
1987–1993	Cruzeiro	89	(12)
1992	→ Bahia (loan)	8	(3)
1993	→ Bahia (loan)	10	(1)
1994–1995	Vitória	80	(40)
1995–1996	Bayer Leverkusen	15	(1)
1996–1999	Vasco da Gama	122	(44)
2000–2002	Atlético Mineiro	52	(17)
2001	→ Fluminense (loan)	5	(5)
2002	Vasco da Gama	24	(19)
2003	Tokyo Verdy	25	(6)
2004	Fluminense	36	(13)
2005	Botafogo	35	(6)
2006	Vasco da Gama	35	(7)
2007	Al-Gharafa	0	(0)
2007	Atlético Paranaense	12	(2)
2008–2010	Vitória	111	(30)
2011–2012	Joinville	50	(12)
2012	Caxias	3	(0)
2013	Cabofriense	7	(2)
Total		719	(220)

International career
2001	Brazil	6	(1)

Managerial career
- 2013–2014: Joinville (assistant)
- 2015: ASEEV
- 2016: Anápolis
- 2016: Guarani-MG
- 2016: Joinville
- 2017: Anápolis
- 2018: Tombense
- 2019–2020: Vasco da Gama (assistant)
- 2020: Vasco da Gama
- 2020: CRB
- 2021: Vitória
- 2022–2025: Brazil U20
- 2023: Brazil (interim)
- 2023–2025: Brazil U23
- 2027–: Primavera
- * Club domestic league appearances and goals

Ramon Menezes Hubner (born 30 June 1972) is a Brazilian professional football coach and former player who played as an attacking midfielder. He is the current head coach of Primavera.

Ramon spent the most of his career in his native Brazil, where he appeared in more than 350 matches and scored 98 goals. Mainly linked to Cruzeiro, Vasco da Gama and Vitória, he also played abroad for Bayer Leverkusen, Tokyo Verdy and Al-Gharafa before retiring with Cabofriense in 2013.

He was capped six times for Brazil, scoring once.

== Playing career ==
=== Club ===
Ramon was born in Contagem, Minas Gerais and joined Cruzeiro in his youth. He made his first team debut on 18 October 1987, starting in a 0–0 Copa União away draw against Flamengo.

Ramon scored his first senior goal on 17 March 1988, netting Cruzeiro's third in a 3–0 home win over Rio Branco de Andradas, for the year's Campeonato Mineiro. He was regularly used during the 1990 season, but later fell down the pecking order.

Ramon spent two periods on loan at Bahia (two months in 1992 and in 1993), but also featured sparingly. He moved to state rivals Vitória in the following year, becoming an immediate starter and scoring a career-best 25 goals in the 1995 Campeonato Baiano.

After impressing for Vitória, Ramon moved abroad and joined Bundesliga side Bayer 04 Leverkusen. He returned to his home country in 1996, signing for Vasco da Gama, and was an important unit in the club's winning run, as he lifted the 1997 Campeonato Brasileiro Série A, the 1998 Campeonato Carioca, the 1998 Copa Libertadores and the 1999 Torneio Rio – São Paulo.

In 2000, Ramon moved to Atlético Mineiro and scored the goal of the title of the year's Campeonato Mineiro. He subsequently agreed to a loan deal with Fluminense in the following year, being notably recognised by his free kick goals.

Ramon then returned to Atlético before rejoining Vasco in 2002, where he scored 15 goals in 17 league appearances to help the side avoid relegation. On 3 January 2003, he left the latter club and joined Tokyo Verdy on an 11-month contract.

Ramon returned to Flu in 2004, but struggled with injuries, and subsequently moved to Botafogo on a one-year deal. He rejoined Vasco for a third spell in January 2006, and a move to Qatar Stars League side Al-Gharafa SC subsequently followed.

Ramon signed for Atlético Paranaense on 9 January 2007, but featured sparingly. On 25 February of the following year, he returned to Vitória, but left the club in the end of the season to play in Turkish football; after playing just friendlies, he rejoined Vitória in March 2009. He left the club in December 2010, after suffering relegation.

On 3 January 2011, 38-year-old Ramon agreed to a contract with Joinville, being a regular starter during the season as his side achieved promotion from the Série C. However, in the following campaign, he only appeared rarely, which prompted to a move to Caxias in October 2012.

On 15 February 2013, at the age of 40, Ramon was presented at Cabofriense. After playing in the Campeonato Carioca Série B, he retired.

=== International ===
Called up to the 2001 FIFA Confederations Cup by manager Émerson Leão, Ramon made his full international debut for Brazil on 31 May of that year, starting and assisting Carlos Miguel in a 2–0 win against Cameroon. He scored his first goal on 7 June, netting his side's only in a 2–1 defeat to France.

== Managerial career ==
Shortly after retiring, Ramon started working at his former club Joinville as an assistant manager. He left the club in January 2015, and was named in charge of ASEEV in August; at the latter club, he won the third division of the Campeonato Goiano.

In 2016, Ramon coached Anápolis, after agreeing to a deal with the club in July of the previous year. He was sacked in February, after just five matches, and subsequently managed Guarani-MG before returning to JEC in September, now being appointed manager. He left the club on 28 November, after failing to avoid relegation.

In May 2017, Ramon returned to Anápolis for the Série D, replacing Waldemar Lemos. He was dismissed in the following month, after four winless matches.

On 23 November 2017, Ramon was appointed manager of Tombense for the ensuing campaign. He was relieved from his duties the following 16 July, after six winless matches.

On 27 December 2018, Ramon rejoined another club he represented as a player, Vasco, as an assistant manager. On 30 March 2020, he replaced sacked Abel Braga at the helm of the main squad.

Ramon was himself dismissed on 8 October 2020, after six winless matches. On 9 November, he replaced departing Marcelo Cabo at the helm of CRB, but was sacked after just nine matches on 18 December.

On 8 June 2021, Ramon was named manager of another club he represented as a player, Vitória. He was sacked on 5 August, after only three wins in 16 matches.

On 7 March 2022, Ramon was named in charge of the Brazil under-20 national team. He won the 2023 South American U-20 Championship with the side, and was named interim manager of the full side on 15 February 2023 following Tite's resignation after the 2022 FIFA World Cup.

== Career statistics ==
=== Club ===
Appearances and goals by club, season and competition
Club	Season	League			State League		Cup		Continental		Other		Total	
Club	Season	Division	Apps	Goals	Apps	Goals	Apps	Goals	Apps	Goals	Apps	Goals	Apps	Goals
Cruzeiro	1987	Série A	1	0	0	0	—		—		—		1	0
Cruzeiro	1988	Série A	1	0	10	3	—		4 (Note: Appearance(s) in Supercopa Libertadores)	1	—		15	4
Cruzeiro	1989	Série A	4	0	1	0	3	0	2	0	—		10	0
Cruzeiro	1990	Série A	19	4	9	0	2	0	2	0	—		32	4
Cruzeiro	1991	Série A	11	1	16	2	2	0	—		—		29	3
Cruzeiro	1992	Série A	8	1	2	1	—		0	0	—		10	2
Cruzeiro	1993	Série A	0	0	7	1	4	0	—		—		11	1
Cruzeiro	Total		44	6	45	6	11	0	8	1	—		108	13
Bahia (loan)	1992	Série A	0	0	8	3	—		—		—		8	3
Bahia (loan)	1993	Série A	10	1	—		—		—		—		10	1
Vitória	1994	Série A	18	7	32	8	3	0	2 (Note: Appearance(s) in Copa CONMEBOL)	2	—		55	17
Vitória	1995	Série A	0	0	30	25	4	3	—		—		34	28
Vitória	Total		18	7	62	33	7	3	2	2	—		89	45
Bayer Leverkusen	1995–96	Bundesliga	15	1	—		3	0	2 (Note: Appearance(s) in UEFA Intertoto Cup)	1	—		20	2
Vasco da Gama	1996	Série A	13	5	—		—		2	2	—		15	7
Vasco da Gama	1997	Série A	30	7	24	14	1	2	6	2	2 (Note: Appearance(s) in Torneio Rio – São Paulo)	4	63	29
Vasco da Gama	1998	Série A	19	10	3	3	4	1	10 (Note: Appearance(s) in Copa Libertadores)	1	6 (Note: Five appearances and one goal in Torneio Rio – São Paulo, one appearance in Intercontinental Cup)	1	42	16
Vasco da Gama	1999	Série A	19	4	14	1	3	1	7 (Note: Two appearances in Copa Libertadores, five appearances and two goals in Copa Mercosur)	2	5	1	48	9
Vasco da Gama	2000	Série A	0	0	0	0	0	0	0	0	4 (Note: Appearance(s) in FIFA Club World Cup)	0	4	0
Vasco da Gama	Total		81	26	41	18	8	4	25	7	17	6	172	61
Atlético Mineiro	2000	Série A	13	2	11	9	5	2	19 (Note: Ten appearances and two goals in Copa Libertadores, nine appearances and one goal in Copa Mercosur)	3	3 (Note: Appearance(s) in Copa Sul-Minas)	0	51	16
Atlético Mineiro	2001	Série A	27	6	1	0	—		—		1	0	29	6
Atlético Mineiro	2002	Série A	0	0	0	0	1	0	—		4	1	5	1
Atlético Mineiro	Total		40	8	12	9	6	2	19	3	8	1	85	23
Fluminense (loan)	2001	Série A	0	0	5	5	5	1	—		—		10	6
Vasco da Gama	2002	Série A	17	15	7	4	—		—		3 (Note: Appearance(s) in Copa dos Campeões)	2	27	21
Tokyo Verdy	2003	J.League 1	25	6	—		—		—		2 (Note: Appearance(s) in J. League Cup)	1	27	7
Fluminense	2004	Série A	25	11	11	2	3	1	—		—		39	14
Botafogo	2005	Série A	24	4	11	2	3	2	—		—		38	8
Vasco da Gama	2006	Série A	27	6	8	1	10	2	1 (Note: Appearance(s) in Copa Sudamericana)	0	—		46	9
Atlético Paranaense	2007	Série A	12	2	0	0	0	0	1	0	—		13	2
Vitória	2008	Série A	30	7	12	3	2	1	—		—		44	11
Vitória	2009	Série A	23	4	9	5	6	0	—		—		38	9
Vitória	2010	Série A	19	1	18	10	7	3	2	1	4 (Note: Appearance(s) in Copa do Nordeste)	0	50	15
Vitória	Total		72	12	39	18	15	4	2	1	4	0	132	35
Joinville	2011	Série C	12	1	19	8	—		—		—		31	9
Joinville	2012	Série B	6	0	13	3	—		—		—		19	3
Joinville	Total		18	1	32	11	—		—		—		50	12
Caxias	2012	Série C	3	0	—		—		—		—		3	0
Cabofriense	2013	Carioca Série B	—		7	2	—		—		—		7	2
Career total			431	106	288	114	71	19	60	15	34	10	884	264

=== International ===
Appearances and goals by national team and year
National team	Year	Apps	Goals
Brazil	2001	5	1
Total		5	1

==== International goals ====
Scores and results list Brazil's goal tally first.

#	Date	Venue	Opponent	Score	Result	Competition	Ref.
1	7 June 2001	Suwon World Cup Stadium, Suwon, South Korea	France	1–1	1–2	2001 FIFA Confederations Cup	

== Coaching statistics ==
As of 20 June 2023

Coaching record by team and tenure
Team	Nat	From	To	Record								Ref
Team	Nat	From	To	G	W	D	L	GF	GA	GD	Win %	Ref
ASEEV	(Brazil)	27 August 2015	31 December 2015	9	7	2	0	27	1	+26	77.78	
Anápolis	(Brazil)	1 January 2016	13 February 2016	9	2	5	2	8	8	+0	22.22	
Guarani-MG	(Brazil)	15 March 2016	10 April 2016	4	2	1	1	5	4	+1	50.00	
Joinville	(Brazil)	18 September 2016	28 November 2016	12	4	4	4	16	14	+2	33.33	
Brazil U23	(Brazil)	5 Jul 2023	present	13	8	1	4	20	7	+13	61.54	
Tombense	(Brazil)	23 November 2017	16 July 2018	26	8	7	11	20	22	−2	30.77	
Vasco da Gama	(Brazil)	30 March 2020	8 October 2020	16	8	3	5	23	20	+3	50.00	
CRB	(Brazil)	9 November 2020	17 December 2020	9	2	2	5	8	14	−6	22.22	
Vitória	(Brazil)	8 June 2021	5 August 2021	16	3	6	7	13	17	−4	18.75	
Brazil U20	(Brazil)	7 March 2022	5 October 2025	40	25	7	8	19	4	+15	62.50	
Brazil (caretaker)	(Brazil)	15 February 2023	4 July 2023	3	1	0	2	7	7	+0	33.33	
Total				120	48	32	40	146	111	+35	40.00	—

== Honours ==
=== Player ===
Cruzeiro

- Campeonato Mineiro: 1990
- Supercopa Libertadores: 1991, 1992
- Copa do Brasil: 1993

Vitória

- Campeonato Baiano: 1995, 2008, 2009, 2010

Vasco da Gama

- Campeonato Brasileiro Série A: 1997
- Campeonato Carioca: 1998
- Copa Libertadores: 1998
- Torneio Rio – São Paulo: 1999

Atlético Minero

- Campeonato Mineiro: 2000

Joinville

- Campeonato Brasileiro Série C: 2011
- Copa Santa Catarina: 2011

Individual

- Bola de Prata: 2002

=== Manager ===
ASEEV

- Campeonato Goiano Terceira Divisão: 2015

Brazil U20

- South American U-20 Championship: 2023, 2025

Brasil U23

- Pan American Games: 2023
