= Vandinho (footballer, born 1980) =

Brazilian footballer

Personal information
- Full name: Vanderlei Bernardo Oliveira
- Date of birth: July 10, 1980 (age 46)
- Place of birth: Presidente Epitácio, Brazil
- Height: 1.78 m (5 ft 10 in)
- Positions: Centre forward; attacking midfielder

Team information
- Current team: Ceará
- Number: 42

Senior career*
| Years | Team | Apps | (Gls) |
| 2008 | Noroeste | | |
| 2008–2010 | São Caetano | | |
| 2010– | Ceará | | |
| 2011– | Noroeste | | |
- * Club domestic league appearances and goals as of September 11, 2010 ‡ National team caps and goals as of September 11, 2010

Vanderlei Bernardo Oliveira, or Vandinho is a centre forward and attacking midfielder who as of 2010 played for Ceará, and signed a preliminary contract to defend the Northwest in 2011.

== Career ==
Oliveira began playing in Vasco and played for other teams such as Union Bandeirantes (SP), Mogi Mirim (SP), Paraná, São Paulo, Ponte Preta, Vila Nova and Northwest.

== Contract ==
- Ceará.
