= Hélcio (footballer, born 1969) =

Brazilian footballer

Personal information
- Full name: Hélcio Roberto Alisk
- Date of birth: 3 August 1969 (age 57)
- Place of birth: Curitiba, Brazil
- Height: 1.80 m (5 ft 11 in)
- Position: Defensive midfielder

Youth career
- Coritiba

Senior career*
| Years | Team | Apps | (Gls) |
| 1986–1993 | Coritiba | | |
| 1988–1989 | → Guarani (loan) | | |
| 1994–1996 | Paraná | | |
| 1997 | Vitória | | |
| 1998 | Matonense | | |
| 1998–2002 | Paraná | | |
| 2000 | → Rio Branco-SP (loan) | | |
| 2002–2004 | Atlético Mineiro | 78 | (5) |
| 2004 | Sport Recife | | |
| 2005 | União São João | | |
| 2005 | Villa Nova | | |
| 2005 | Ulbra-RS | | |

International career
| 1986 | Brazil Olympic | 2 | (0) |
Medal record
Men's Football
Representing Brazil
South American Games
| Bronze medal – third place | 1986 Santiago |
- * Club domestic league appearances and goals as of 23 November 2023

Hélcio Roberto Alisk (born 3 August 1969), simply known as Hélcio, is a Brazilian former professional footballer who played as a defensive midfielder.

== Career ==
A graduate of Coritiba's youth categories, he made more than 100 appearances for the club. He also played for Guarani and rival Paraná Clube, where he also made more than 100 appearances and became one of the greatest players in the club's history. He also stood out at Vitória and Atlético Mineiro. He ended his career in 2005.

== Honours ==
Brazil Olympic

- South American Games: (bronze) 1986

Coritiba

- Campeonato Paranaense: 1989

Paraná

- Copa João Havelange Group Yellow: 2000
- Campeonato Paranaense: 1994, 1995, 1996

Vitória

- Copa do Nordeste: 1997
- Campeonato Baiano: 1997
