= 1994 Campeonato Carioca =

Campeonato Carioca
- Season: 1994
- Champions: Vasco da Gama
- Copa do Brasil: Flamengo; Vasco da Gama; Volta Redonda
- Série C: América; Campo Grande
- Matches played: 79
- Goals scored: 179 (2.27 per match)
- Top goalscorer: Túlio (Botafogo); Charles (Flamengo) - 14 goals
- Biggest home win: Botafogo 6-0 América (January 30, 1994); Fluminense 7-1 Botafogo (April 29, 1994)
- Biggest away win: Campo Grande 0-5 Fluminense (February 9, 1994)
- Highest scoring: Fluminense 7-1 Botafogo (April 29, 1994)

The 1994 edition of the Campeonato Carioca kicked off on January 30, 1994 and ended on May 15, 1994. It is the official tournament organized by FFERJ (Federação de Futebol do Estado do Rio de Janeiro, or Rio de Janeiro State Football Federation. Only clubs based in the Rio de Janeiro State are allowed to play. Twelve teams contested this edition. Vasco da Gama won the title for the 20th time. no teams were relegated.

== System ==
The tournament would be divided in two stages:

- Taça Guanabara: The twelve teams were divided into two groups of six. the teams all played in a single round-robin format against each other. The best teams of each group went to the Finals to define the champions of that phase. they received one bonus point for the next phase, and the team with the best overall record earned another extra point. The runners-up in each group also qualified to the Final phase.
- Final phase: The remaining four teams all played in a double round-robin format against each other. the team with the most points was champion.

== Championship ==
=== Taça Guanabara ===
==== Group A ====
| Pos | Team | Pld | W | D | L | GF | GA | GD | Pts | Qualification or relegation |
|---|---|---|---|---|---|---|---|---|---|---|
| 1 | Vasco da Gama | 11 | 8 | 3 | 0 | 15 | 3 | +12 | 19 | Qualified to Finals |
| 2 | Flamengo | 11 | 6 | 3 | 2 | 23 | 14 | +9 | 15 | Qualified |
| 3 | Bangu | 11 | 5 | 4 | 2 | 13 | 6 | +7 | 14 | |
| 4 | Volta Redonda | 11 | 3 | 4 | 4 | 9 | 12 | −3 | 10 | |
| 5 | Madureira | 11 | 1 | 8 | 2 | 5 | 4 | +1 | 10 | |
| 6 | Itaperuna | 11 | 2 | 1 | 8 | 10 | 23 | −13 | 5 | |

Updated to match(es) played on March 27, 1994. Source: RSSSF.com
Rules for classification: 1) points; 2) wins; 3) goal difference; 4) number of goals scored.

==== Group B ====
| Pos | Team | Pld | W | D | L | GF | GA | GD | Pts | Qualification or relegation |
|---|---|---|---|---|---|---|---|---|---|---|
| 1 | Fluminense | 11 | 6 | 4 | 1 | 19 | 6 | +13 | 16 | Qualified to Finals |
| 2 | Botafogo | 11 | 6 | 3 | 2 | 20 | 9 | +11 | 15 | Qualified |
| 3 | Americano | 11 | 2 | 7 | 2 | 6 | 8 | −2 | 11 | |
| 4 | Olaria | 11 | 2 | 4 | 5 | 8 | 13 | −5 | 8 | |
| 5 | América | 11 | 1 | 4 | 6 | 7 | 17 | −10 | 6 | |
| 6 | Campo Grande | 11 | 0 | 3 | 8 | 4 | 24 | −20 | 3 | |

Updated to match(es) played on March 27, 1994. Source: RSSSF.com
Rules for classification: 1) points; 2) wins; 3) goal difference; 4) number of goals scored.

==== Finals ====
| Team 1 | Score | Team 2 |
|---|---|---|
| Fluminense | 1–4 | Vasco da Gama |

=== Final phase ===
| Pos | Team | Pld | W | D | L | GF | GA | GD | Pts | Qualification or relegation |
|---|---|---|---|---|---|---|---|---|---|---|
| 1 | Vasco da Gama | 6 | 3 | 2 | 1 | 9 | 5 | +4 | 10 | Champions |
| 2 | Flamengo | 6 | 4 | 1 | 1 | 10 | 6 | +4 | 9 | |
| 3 | Fluminense | 6 | 2 | 2 | 2 | 12 | 8 | +4 | 7 | |
| 4 | Botafogo | 6 | 0 | 1 | 5 | 4 | 16 | −12 | 1 | |

Updated to match(es) played on May 15, 1994. Source: RSSSF.com
Rules for classification: 1) points; 2) goal difference; 3) wins; 4) number of goals scored.
