= Henrique (footballer, born 1977) =

Brazilian footballer (1977–2026)

Personal information
- Full name: Leonardo Henrique Peixoto dos Santos
- Date of birth: 16 July 1977
- Place of birth: Rio de Janeiro, Brazil
- Date of death: 16 September 2026 (aged 49)
- Height: 1.88 m (6 ft 2 in)
- Position: Centre-back

Youth career
- 1995–1997: Bonsucesso

Senior career*
| Years | Team | Apps | (Gls) |
| 1998–2001 | Vasco da Gama | | |
| 2001–2003 | Litex Lovech | | |
| 2003–2004 | Vasco da Gama | 35 | (3) |
| 2005 | Atlético Mineiro | 22 | (0) |
| 2006 | Fluminense | 7 | (0) |
| 2007 | Madureira | | |
| 2008 | Vila Nova | | |
| 2007–2008 | Itumbiara | | |
| 2008–2009 | Goiás Esporte Clube | 38 | (1) |
| 2010 | Itumbiara | | |
| 2010 | Náutico | | |
- * Club domestic league appearances and goals

Leonardo Henrique Peixoto dos Santos (16 July 1977 – 16 September 2026), known mononymously as Henrique, was a Brazilian professional footballer who played as a centre-back.

Henrique joined Campeonato Brasileiro Série A club Goiás Esporte Clube in 2008. He died on 16 September 2026, at the age of 49.
