= Casimiro de Abreu Esporte Clube =

Casimiro de Abreu
- Full name: Casimiro de Abreu Esporte Clube
- Founded: 30 May 1975
- Ground: Ubirajara de Almeida Reis
- Capacity: 3,000
Home colours	Away colours

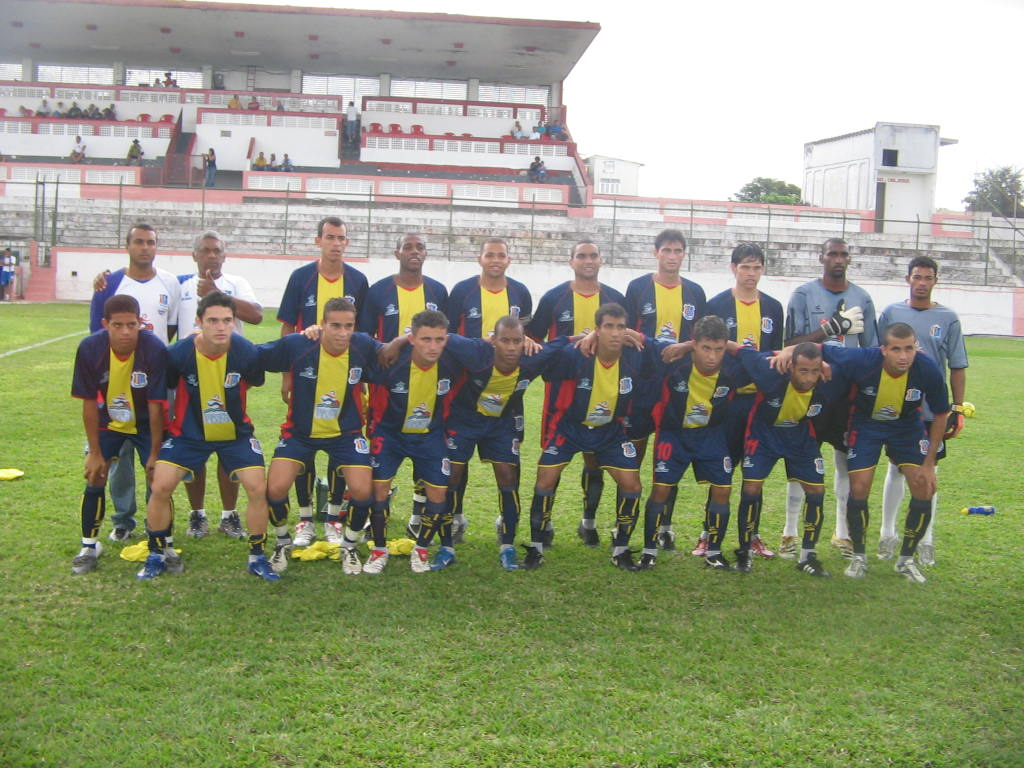
Team photo from the 2007 season

Casimiro de Abreu Esporte Clube, also known simply as Casimiro de Abreu, or by the acronym CAEC, is a Brazilian football team from the city of Casimiro de Abreu, Rio de Janeiro state, founded on May 30, 1975.

== History ==
Eleven athletes, dissatisfied with Independente Esporte Clube, left their club and founded an amateur club called Onze Tufões (meaning Eleven Hurricanes).

On May 30, 1975, with the help of Casimiro de Abreu's city hall, Casimiro de Abreu Esporte Clube was founded by the eleven athletes.

In 2000, Casimiro de Abreu professionalized its football section.

In 2002, the club won its first title, the Campeonato Carioca Módulo Especial, beating Artsul of Nova Iguaçu city in the final.

In 2003, CAEC signed a partnership with Grupo FMK.

== Titles ==
- Campeonato Carioca Second Division: 2000
- Campeonato Carioca Third Division: 2002

== Stadium ==
The home stadium Ubirajara de Almeida Reis, named after one of the club founders, has a capacity of 3,000 people. The stadium is nicknamed Caecão, which is the augmentative form of the club's acronym CAEC.

== Colors ==
The official colors are yellow, blue and red.

== Club kits ==
The home kit is all yellow, with details in red and blue in the shirt and in the shorts. The away kit is all blue.

== Mascot ==
The team's mascot is called Poetinha (Little Poet) in reference to the famous poet that the city is named after, Casimiro de Abreu.
