= Estádio Godofredo Cruz =

Sports venue in Campos dos Goytacazes, Brazil

Coordinates: 21°45′35″S 41°20′27″W

Estádio Godofredo Cruz is a multi-use stadium in Campos dos Goytacazes, Brazil. It is used mostly for football matches. The stadium has a maximum capacity of 25,000 people, and it is owned by Americano Futebol Clube.
