= 1997 Campeonato Brasileiro Série A =

Campeonato Brasileiro Série A
- Season: 1997
- Champions: Vasco da Gama (3rd title)
- Relegated: Bahia; Criciúma; Fluminense; União São João
- Copa Libertadores: Cruzeiro (title holders); Vasco da Gama; Grêmio (via Copa do Brasil)
- Matches: 351
- Goals: 969 (2.76 per match)
- Top goalscorer: Edmundo (29 goals)

The 1997 Campeonato Brasileiro Série A was the 41st edition of the Campeonato Brasileiro Série A, the highest level of Brazil's football league system.

This edition featured participation by 26 teams. Vasco da Gama won the title.

== First phase ==
Pos	Team	Pld	W	D	L	GF	GA	GD	Pts	
1	Vasco da Gama	25	17	3	5	55	32	+23	54	Qualified to Second Phase
2	Internacional	25	15	6	4	52	21	+31	51	Qualified to Second Phase
3	Atlético Mineiro	25	14	5	6	42	33	+9	47	Qualified to Second Phase
4	Portuguesa	25	12	9	4	45	28	+17	45	Qualified to Second Phase
5	Flamengo	25	12	6	7	30	24	+6	42	Qualified to Second Phase
6	Santos	25	12	5	8	39	33	+6	41	Qualified to Second Phase
7	Palmeiras	25	10	10	5	47	24	+23	40	Qualified to Second Phase
8	Juventude	25	9	10	6	24	20	+4	37	Qualified to Second Phase
9	Vitória	25	9	9	7	44	40	+4	36	
10	Botafogo	25	8	10	7	32	32	0	34	
11	Sport	25	9	6	10	34	32	+2	33	
12	São Paulo	25	8	9	8	41	32	+9	33	
13	Paraná	25	8	8	9	30	30	0	32	
14	Grêmio	25	7	10	8	34	47	−13	31	
15	Coritiba	25	7	9	9	31	32	−1	30	
16	América de Natal	25	7	9	9	31	40	−9	30	
17	Corinthians	25	8	5	12	23	27	−4	29	
18	Atlético Paranaense	25	9	6	10	37	41	−4	28 (Note: 5 points deducted)	
19	Goiás	25	8	4	13	30	40	−10	28	
20	Cruzeiro	25	6	10	9	30	35	−5	28	
21	Guarani	25	6	10	9	36	43	−7	28	
22	Bragantino	25	7	5	13	27	46	−19	26	
23	Bahia	25	6	8	11	39	49	−10	26	Relegated to 1998 Série B
24	Criciúma	25	6	7	12	27	35	−8	25	Relegated to 1998 Série B
25	Fluminense	25	4	10	11	26	41	−15	22	Relegated to 1998 Série B
26	União São João	25	2	9	14	18	47	−29	15	Relegated to 1998 Série B

Source: https://rsssfbrasil.com/tablesae/br1997.htm

== Second phase ==
Group A
Pos	Team	Pld	W	D	L	GF	GA	GD	Pts	Qualification
1	Vasco da Gama	6	4	2	0	14	5	+9	14	Qualified for the final
2	Flamengo	6	2	2	2	7	8	−1	8	
3	Juventude	6	2	1	3	6	11	−5	7	
4	Portuguesa	6	1	1	4	5	8	−3	4	

Group B
Pos	Team	Pld	W	D	L	GF	GA	GD	Pts	Qualification
1	Palmeiras	6	5	1	0	10	4	+6	16	Qualified for the final
2	Santos	6	2	1	3	9	10	−1	7	
3	Internacional	6	2	0	4	8	10	−2	6	
4	Atlético Mineiro	6	2	0	4	6	9	−3	6	

== Final ==
December 14, 1997

Palmeiras	0–0	Vasco da Gama

Morumbi

December 21, 1997

Vasco da Gama	0–0	Palmeiras

Maracanã

Vasco da Gama were declared as the Campeonato Brasileiro champions because the club had scored more points than Palmeiras throughout the year.

== Final standings ==
Pos	Team	Pld	W	D	L	GF	GA	GD	Pts
1	Vasco da Gama	33	21	7	5	69	37	+32	70
2	Palmeiras	33	15	13	5	57	28	+29	58
3	Internacional	31	17	6	8	60	31	+29	57
4	Atlético Mineiro	31	16	5	10	48	42	+6	53
5	Flamengo	31	14	8	9	37	32	+5	50
6	Portuguesa	31	13	10	8	50	36	+14	49
7	Santos	31	14	6	11	48	43	+5	48
8	Juventude	31	11	11	9	30	31	−1	44
9	Vitória	25	9	9	7	44	40	+4	36
10	Botafogo	25	8	10	7	32	32	0	34
11	Sport	25	9	6	10	34	32	+2	33
12	São Paulo	25	8	9	8	41	32	+9	33
13	Paraná	25	8	8	9	30	30	0	32
14	Grêmio	25	7	10	8	34	47	−13	31
15	Coritiba	25	7	9	9	31	32	−1	30
16	América de Natal	25	7	9	9	31	40	−9	30
17	Corinthians	25	8	5	12	23	27	−4	29
18	Atlético Paranaense	25	9	6	10	37	41	−4	28 (Note: 5 points deducted)
19	Goiás	25	8	4	13	30	40	−10	28
20	Cruzeiro	25	6	10	9	30	35	−5	28
21	Guarani	25	6	10	9	36	43	−7	28
22	Bragantino	25	7	5	13	27	46	−19	26
23	Bahia (R)	25	6	8	11	39	49	−10	26
24	Criciúma (R)	25	6	7	12	27	35	−8	25
25	Fluminense (R)	25	4	10	11	26	41	−15	22
26	União São João (R)	25	2	9	14	18	47	−29	15

(R) Relegated

== Top scorers ==
Pos.	Scorer	Club	Goals
1	(Brazil) Edmundo	Vasco	29
2	(Brazil) Christian	Internacional	24
3	(Brazil) Dodô	São Paulo	21
4	(Brazil) Rodrigo Fabri	Portuguesa	17
5	(Brazil) Valdir	Atlético Mineiro	16
6	(Brazil) Guga	Portuguesa	13
7	(Brazil) Oséas	Palmeiras	11
