= 1998 Campeonato Carioca =

Campeonato Carioca
- Season: 1998
- Champions: Vasco da Gama
- Copa do Brasil: Flamengo; Fluminense; Botafogo; Vasco da Gama
- Série C: Friburguense; América; Madureira
- Matches played: 86
- Goals scored: 222 (2.58 per match)
- Top goalscorer: Romário (Flamengo) - 10 goals
- Biggest home win: Vasco da Gama 5-0 Americano (February 1, 1998)
- Biggest away win: Madureira 0-4 Vasco da Gama (April 12, 1998)
- Highest scoring: Itaperuna 3-4 Volta Redonda (March 1, 1998); Vasco da Gama 4-3 Fluminense (March 8, 1998)

The 1998 edition of the Campeonato Carioca kicked off on January 25, 1998 and ended on May 17, 1998. It is the official tournament organized by FFERJ (Federação de Futebol do Estado do Rio de Janeiro, or Rio de Janeiro State Football Federation. Only clubs based in the Rio de Janeiro State are allowed to play. Twelve teams contested this edition. Vasco da Gama won the title for the 21st time. no teams were relegated.

== System ==
The tournament was divided in four stages:

- Preliminary tournament: The five teams that had been eliminated in the First and second phases of 1997's championship joined Friburguense, champions of the 1997 Second Level. The teams all played against each other in a double round-robin format, with the best two teams qualifying into the main tournament.
- Taça Guanabara: The teams that had participated in 1997's third phase earned a bye directly to this phase: the 8 clubs all played in single round-robin format against each other.
- Taça Rio: The 8 clubs all played in single round-robin format against each other.
- Finals: The Finals would happen in two matches, both played at the Maracanã Stadium, between the champions of the Taças Guanabara and Rio. However, since Vasco da Gama won both tournaments, the finals didn't happen.

== Championship ==
=== Preliminary phase ===
Pos	Team	Pld	W	D	L	GF	GA	GD	Pts	Qualification or relegation
1	Friburguense	10	6	3	1	18	9	+9	21	Qualified
2	Madureira	10	5	3	2	16	8	+8	18	Qualified
3	Olaria	10	4	4	2	15	9	+6	16	
4	Volta Redonda	10	4	1	5	9	12	−3	13	
5	América	10	2	3	5	8	14	−6	9	
6	Itaperuna	10	1	2	7	8	22	−14	5	

Updated to match(es) played on March 1, 1998. Source: RSSSF.com
Rules for classification: 1) points; 2) wins; 3) goal difference; 4) number of goals scored.

=== Taça Guanabara ===
Pos	Team	Pld	W	D	L	GF	GA	GD	Pts	Qualification or relegation
1	Vasco da Gama	7	5	1	1	18	5	+13	16	Champions
2	Flamengo	7	4	2	1	11	3	+8	14	
3	Madureira	7	3	1	3	10	14	−4	10	
4	Fluminense	7	2	3	2	10	9	+1	9	
5	Bangu	7	2	2	3	7	9	−2	8	
6	Botafogo	7	2	2	3	7	11	−4	8	
7	Americano	7	1	3	3	8	14	−6	6	
8	Friburguense	7	1	2	4	6	12	−6	5	

Updated to match(es) played on April 8, 1998. Source: RSSSF.com
Rules for classification: 1) points; 2) wins; 3) goal difference; 4) number of goals scored.

=== Taça Rio ===
Pos	Team	Pld	W	D	L	GF	GA	GD	Pts	Qualification or relegation
1	Vasco da Gama	7	6	0	1	11	3	+8	18	Champions
2	Fluminense	7	3	2	2	10	6	+4	11	
3	Flamengo	7	3	2	2	11	11	0	11	
4	Friburguense	7	3	0	4	10	11	−1	9	
5	Bangu	7	2	3	2	7	9	−2	9	
6	Botafogo	7	1	3	3	10	13	−3	6	
7	Madureira	7	1	2	4	7	11	−4	5	
8	Americano	7	1	2	4	5	11	−6	5	

Updated to match(es) played on May 17, 1998. Source: RSSSF.com
Rules for classification: 1) points; 2) wins; 3) goal difference; 4) number of goals scored.
