= 1998 Copa Libertadores =

39th season of Copa Libertadores

1998 Copa Libertadores de América
Libertadores 1998

Tournament details
- Dates: 25 February – 26 August
- Teams: 23 (from 11 associations)

Final positions
- Champions: (Brazil) Vasco da Gama (1st title)
- Runners-up: (Ecuador) Barcelona

Tournament statistics
- Matches played: 98
- Goals scored: 220 (2.24 per match)

The 1998 Copa Libertadores was the 39th in the tournament's history. It was held between February 25 and August 26. Mexican clubs participated in Copa Libertadores for the first time. Vasco da Gama won the cup for the first time in the tournament's history, after defeating Barcelona of Ecuador in the final.

== Pre-Libertadores ==
Pos	Team	Pld	W	D	L	GF	GA	GD	Pts
1	(Mexico) Guadalajara	4	3	1	0	12	5	+7	10
2	(Mexico) América	4	2	1	1	7	3	+4	7
3	(Venezuela) Caracas	4	1	2	1	4	6	−2	5
4	(Venezuela) Atlético Zulia	4	0	0	4	4	13	−9	0

== Group stage ==
=== Group 1 ===
Pos	Team	Pld	W	D	L	GF	GA	GD	Pts	Qualification
1	(Colombia) América de Cali	6	3	2	1	10	5	+5	11	Round of 16
2	(Ecuador) Barcelona	6	2	3	1	5	3	+2	9	Round of 16
3	(Colombia) Atlético Bucaramanga	6	2	1	3	5	6	−1	7	Round of 16
4	(Ecuador) Deportivo Quito	6	1	2	3	3	9	−6	5	

=== Group 2 ===
Pos	Team	Pld	W	D	L	GF	GA	GD	Pts	Qualification
1	(Brazil) Grêmio	6	4	0	2	6	5	+1	12	Round of 16
2	(Brazil) Vasco da Gama	6	2	2	2	7	4	+3	8	Round of 16
3	(Mexico) América	6	2	2	2	6	5	+1	8	Round of 16
4	(Mexico) Guadalajara	6	2	0	4	2	7	−5	6	

=== Group 3 ===
Pos	Team	Pld	W	D	L	GF	GA	GD	Pts	Qualification
1	(Paraguay) Olimpia	6	4	1	1	14	6	+8	13	Round of 16
2	(Chile) Colo-Colo	6	2	1	3	8	10	−2	7	Round of 16
3	(Paraguay) Cerro Porteño	6	2	1	3	6	9	−3	7	Round of 16
4	(Chile) Universidad Católica	6	2	1	3	5	8	−3	7	

=== Group 4 ===
Pos	Team	Pld	W	D	L	GF	GA	GD	Pts	Qualification
1	(Bolivia) Bolívar	6	4	1	1	9	7	+2	13	Round of 16
2	(Uruguay) Peñarol	6	3	1	2	12	5	+7	10	Round of 16
3	(Uruguay) Nacional	6	2	0	4	11	12	−1	6	Round of 16
4	(Bolivia) Oriente Petrolero	6	1	2	3	7	15	−8	5	

=== Group 5 ===
Pos	Team	Pld	W	D	L	GF	GA	GD	Pts	Qualification
1	(Argentina) River Plate	6	5	1	0	15	6	+9	16	Round of 16
2	(Peru) Alianza Lima	6	2	1	3	5	7	−2	7	Round of 16
3	(Argentina) Colón	6	2	1	3	5	8	−3	7	Round of 16
4	(Peru) Sporting Cristal	6	1	1	4	7	11	−4	4	

== Knockout stages ==
=== Bracket ===
Round of 16
(Uruguay) Nacional	1	0	1
(Brazil) Grêmio	1	4	5
(Brazil) Vasco da Gama	2	0	2
(Brazil) Cruzeiro	1	0	1
(Mexico) América	1	0	1
(Argentina) River Plate	1	1	2
(Paraguay) Olimpia	2	1	3 (1)
(Argentina) Colón	3	0	3 (2)
(Colombia) Bucaramanga	1	0	1
(Bolivia) Bolívar	2	1	3
(Ecuador) Barcelona	2	2	4
(Chile) Colo-Colo	1	2	3
(Peru) Alianza Lima	1	1	2 (1)
(Uruguay) Peñarol	0	2	2 (3)
(Paraguay) Cerro Porteño	1	2	3
(Colombia) América de Cali	0	1	1

Quarterfinals
(Brazil) Grêmio	1	0	1
(Brazil) Vasco da Gama	1	1	2
(Argentina) River Plate	2	3	5
(Argentina) Colón	1	1	2
(Bolivia) Bolívar	1	0	1
(Ecuador) Barcelona	1	4	5
(Uruguay) Peñarol	2	0	2
(Paraguay) Cerro Porteño	0	3	3

Semifinals
(Brazil) Vasco da Gama	1	1	2
(Argentina) River Plate	0	1	1
(Ecuador) Barcelona	1	1	2 (4)
(Paraguay) Cerro Porteño	0	2	2 (3)

Finals
(Brazil) Vasco da Gama	2	2	4
(Ecuador) Barcelona	0	1	1

=== Round of 16 ===
First leg matches were played on April 15, April 22 and April 23. Second leg matches were on April 29, April 30, May 2 and May 7.

Team 1	Agg.	Team 2	1st leg	2nd leg
Cerro Porteño (Paraguay)	3-1	(Colombia) América de Cali	1-0	2-1
Nacional (Uruguay)	1-5	(Brazil) Grêmio	1-1	0-4
Olimpia (Paraguay)	3-3 (1-2 pk)	(Argentina) Colón	2-3	1-0
Bucaramanga (Colombia)	1-3	(Bolivia) Bolívar	1-2	0-1
América (Mexico)	1-2	(Argentina) River Plate	1-1	0-1
Barcelona (Ecuador)	4-3	(Chile) Colo-Colo	2-1	2-2
Alianza Lima (Peru)	2-2 (1-3 pk)	(Uruguay) Peñarol	1-0	1-2
Vasco da Gama (Brazil)	2-1	(Brazil) Cruzeiro	2-1	0-0

=== Quarterfinals ===
First leg matches were played on May 3, May 13 and May 20. Second leg matches were played on May 6 and May 27.

Team 1	Agg.	Team 2	1st leg	2nd leg
Grêmio (Brazil)	1-2	(Brazil) Vasco da Gama	1-1	0-1
River Plate (Argentina)	5-2	(Argentina) Colón	2-1	3-1
Peñarol (Uruguay)	2-3	(Paraguay) Cerro Porteño	2-0	0-3
Bolívar (Bolivia)	1-5	(Ecuador) Barcelona	1-1	0-4

=== Semi-finals ===
First leg matches were played on July 16. Second leg matches were played on July 22.

Team 1	Agg.	Team 2	1st leg	2nd leg
Barcelona (Ecuador)	2-2 (4-3 pk)	(Paraguay) Cerro Porteño	1-0	1-2
Vasco da Gama (Brazil)	2-1	(Argentina) River Plate	1-0	1-1

=== Finals ===
First leg match was played on August 12. Second leg match was played on August 26.

Team 1	Agg.	Team 2	1st leg	2nd leg
Vasco da Gama (Brazil)	4-1	(Ecuador) Barcelona	2-0	2-1

== Broadcasting rights ==
=== Americas ===
- (Organization of American States) Latin America: Sportsnet, TSN, TVC Sports, CMD and Best Cable Sports
