= Wilton =

Wilton may refer to:

== Places ==
=== Australia ===
- Wilton, New South Wales, a small town near Sydney
- Wilton Parish, New South Wales

=== England ===
- Wilton, Cumbria
- Wilton, Herefordshire
- Wilton, Ryedale, North Yorkshire, a village and civil parish
- Wilton, Redcar and Cleveland, North Yorkshire
- Wilton, Somerset, a suburb of Taunton
- Wilton, Wiltshire, a town near Salisbury
  - Wilton (UK Parliament constituency), until 1885
- Wilton, Marlborough, Wiltshire, a hamlet
- Wilton (ward), a former City of Westminster electoral ward

=== Ireland ===
- Wilton, Cork, a suburb of Cork City
- Wilton, County Offaly, a townland in Kilmanaghan civil parish

=== United States ===
- Wilton, Alabama, a town
- Wilton, Arkansas, a city
- Wilton, California, a census-designated place
- Wilton, Connecticut, a town
- Wilton, Illinois, an unincorporated community
- Wilton Township, Will County, Illinois
- Wilton, Iowa, a city
- Wilton Township, Muscatine County, Iowa
- Wilton, Maine, a town
  - Wilton (CDP), Maine, a census-designated place in the town
- Wilton, Minnesota, a city
- Wilton Township, Waseca County, Minnesota
- Wilton, Missouri, an unincorporated community
- Wilton, New Hampshire, a town
  - Wilton (CDP), New Hampshire, a census-designated place in the town
- Wilton, New York, a town
- Wilton, North Dakota, a city
- Wilton, Wisconsin, a village
- Wilton (town), Wisconsin, a town adjacent to the village of Wilton

=== Elsewhere ===
- Rural Municipality of Wilton No. 472, Saskatchewan, Canada
- Wilton, New Zealand, a suburb of Wellington
- Wilton, Scottish Borders, Scotland, a parish
- Wilton, Zimbabwe, a village in the Mashonaland East province

== Buildings ==
=== England ===
- Wilton Castle, Herefordshire
- Wilton Castle (Redcar and Cleveland), North Yorkshire
- Wilton Abbey, Wiltshire, a former Benedictine convent
- Wilton House, a country house in Wilton, Wiltshire
- Wilton Windmill, near Wilton, Marlborough, Wiltshire

=== United States ===
- Wilton (Wye Mills, Maryland), a home on the National Register of Historic Places
- Wilton (Wilton, Virginia), a plantation house on the National Register of Historic Places
- Wilton station (Metro-North), a commuter rail station Wilton, Connecticut, United States
- Wilton station (North Dakota), a former railway station in Wilton, North Dakota, United States

== People ==
- Wilton (given name)
- Wilton (surname)
- Wilton (footballer), Brazilian football midfielder and manager Wilton Cezar Xavier (1947–2009)
- Marie Wilton, stage name of Effie Bancroft (1839–1921), English actress and theatre manager

== Fictional characters ==
- Derek and Mavis Wilton (née Riley), from the British soap opera Coronation Street
- Harrison and Meadow Wilton, from the American TV series American Horror Story: Cult
- Jack Wilton, protagonist of The Unfortunate Traveller, a 1594 picaresque novel by Thomas Nashe

== Other uses ==
- HMS Wilton (L128), a Second World War Royal Navy destroyer
- HMS Wilton (M1116), a former Royal Navy minesweeper
- Wilton Scenic Railroad, a heritage railroad which operated seasonally in southern New Hampshire from 2003 to 2006
- Wilton carpet, a specific type of pile carpet
- Wilton Brands, a baking, cake decorating and candy making company owned by Dr. Oetker

== See also ==
- Wilton culture, an archaeological culture from Africa
- Edith of Wilton (c. 961–c. 984), English saint, nun and daughter of Edgar, King of England
- Eve of Wilton (c. 1058–c. 1125), Benedictine nun and anchoress
- Wulfthryth of Wilton (died c. 1000), second known consort of Edgar, King of England
- Lord Wilton, an antique violin made by Guarneri
- Whilton, Northamptonshire, England, a village
