= Copa Rio (state cup) =

- Founded: 1991
- Region: (Rio de Janeiro (state)) Rio de Janeiro
- Teams: 16 (2024)
- Current champions: Boavista (2nd title)
- Most championships: Volta Redonda (5 titles)

The Copa Rio (English: Rio Cup) is a regional cup competition for football clubs in the Rio de Janeiro state. It is run by the Rio de Janeiro State Football Federation. Volta Redonda has the record for most trophies won.

As of 2025, the competition's rules exclude all national Série A and Série B clubs, with participation optional for clubs in Série C. Copa Rio champions are given a choice between qualifying for the following year's Copa do Brasil or Série D, with the runner-up qualifying for the competition that the winner didn't choose. The competition's participants include 8 Rio de Janeiro State Série A clubs, 8 Série A2 clubs, 4 Série B1 clubs and 4 Série B2 clubs.

== History ==
The competition was founded in 1991 by the Rio de Janeiro State Football Federation to decide one of the Rio de Janeiro's Copa do Brasil representatives of the following year (the other being the Campeonato Carioca champion). If the state champion had also won Copa Rio, the representative would have been the tournament runner-up. However, in 1995 the Brazilian Football Confederation established the possibility of a club being invited to dispute Copa do Brasil, and, as a consequence of this, Copa Rio ended up not being interesting for the big teams, so it was discontinued. Flamengo won the first competition with Léo Júnior as captain. It started in April 20 and was concluded on 10 August 1991.

In 1996 and 1997, the competition was replaced by a similar competition disputed only by Rio de Janeiro state countryside clubs, commonly known as Copa do Interior (Portuguese for Countryside Cup). In 1998, there was an attempt to recreate Copa Rio, but without the qualification to Copa do Brasil. This attempt was a failure, and after three years, the competition was discontinued again. During that season only Flamengo and Fluminense participated from the Rio's Big 4, while none of them joined the competition in the following year and only Botafogo in 2000. Thus, the Rio Cup started losing its shine in the decade to follow.

In 2008, the third-placed team (Madureira) was eligible to play in Copa Rio-Espírito Santo. In 2005 and in 2007, the competition was held again, but without the participation of the big clubs of the state, and again without qualification to Copa do Brasil.

== Champions ==
=== Capital and interior winners ===
The competition was split in two groups with separate finals from 1991 to 1995.

Year	Capital	Interior
1991	Flamengo	Americano
1992	Vasco da Gama	Americano
1993	Flamengo	Americano
1994	Fluminense	Volta Redonda
1995	Botafogo	Volta Redonda

=== Copa do Rio ===
Year	Winner	Score	Runner-up
1991	Flamengo	1–0; 3–0	Americano
1992	Vasco da Gama	2–0; 2–1	Fluminense
1993	Vasco da Gama	2–0; 1–0	Flamengo
1994	Volta Redonda	1–4; 1–0 (5–4 p)	Fluminense
1995	Volta Redonda	4–0; 0–0	Barra
1998	Fluminense	4–0	São Cristóvão
1999	Volta Redonda	2–0; 1–0	Madureira
2000	Portuguesa	4–1	Casimiro de Abreu
2005	Tigres do Brasil	1–0; 2–0	Macaé
2007	Volta Redonda	3–1; 0–2 (4–2 p)	Cabofriense
2008	Nova Iguaçu	1–0; 3–2	Americano
2009	Tigres do Brasil	2–2; 2–0	Madureira
2010	Sendas	1–0; 1–2 (4–3 p)	Bangu
2011	Madureira	2–1; 3–2	Friburguense
2012	Nova Iguaçu	0–0; 1–0	Bangu
2013	Duque de Caxias	0–1; 3–1	Boavista
2014	Resende	0–1; 1–0 (3–1 p)	Madureira
2015	Resende	0–0; 5–2	Portuguesa
2016	Portuguesa	3–2; 3–4 (4–3 p)	Friburguense
2017	Boavista	0–1; 1-0 (4–2 p)	Americano
2018	Americano	1–1; 1–0	Itaboraí
2019	Bonsucesso	0–0; 1–0	Portuguesa
2020	Canceled due to the COVID-19 pandemic in Brazil.		
2021	Pérolas Negras	1–1; 1–1 (7–6 p)	Maricá
2022	Volta Redonda	3–1; 1–1	Portuguesa
2023	Portuguesa	2–2; 3–0	Olaria
2024	Maricá	1–0; 0–0	Olaria
2025	Portuguesa	0–1; 2–0	America
2026	Boavista	1–1; 2–0	Nova Iguaçu

=== Titles by club ===
Club	Titles
Volta Redonda	5
Portuguesa	4
Boavista	2
Nova Iguaçu	2
Resende	2
Tigres do Brasil	2
Americano	1
Bonsucesso	1
Duque de Caxias	1
Flamengo	1
Fluminense	1
Madureira	1
Maricá	1
Pérolas Negras	1
Sendas	1
Vasco da Gama	1

== Copa do Interior ==
=== List of champions ===
Year	Champion
1996	Rubro Social
1997	Duquecaxiense

=== Titles by team ===
Club	Titles
Duquecaxiense	1 title
Rubro Social	1 title

== Records and statistics ==
=== Participations of Big Four ===
Rio's Big Four participated in the early competitions. Their last appearance was in 2000 before the Cup went on hiatus. Botafogo is the only club out of the 4 that never won the competition.

Club	Years	Appearances
Flamengo	1991, 1992, 1993, 1994, 1995, 1998	6
Fluminense	1991, 1992, 1993, 1994, 1995, 1998	6
Botafogo	1991, 1992, 1993, 1994, 1995, 2000	6
Vasco da Gama	1991, 1992, 1993, 1994, 1995	5

=== Topscorers ===
Year	Player	Club	Goals
2007	Éberson	Portuguesa-RJ	10
2008	Assumpção	Olaria	13
2009	Daniel	Sendas	16
2010	Pipico; Rondinelli; Tano	Bangu; Goytacaz; Bangu	8
2011	Wellinton Pimenta	Serra Macaense	8
2012	Derley	Madureira	10
2013	Tiago Amaral	Volta Redonda	8
2014	Gilcimar	America-RJ	8
2015	Douglas Caé; Sabão; Tiago Amaral	Resende; Gonçalense; Volta Redonda	6
2016	Lohan	Friburguense	11
2017	Felipe Augusto	Boavista-RJ	5
2018	Cláudio Maradona	Americano	7
2019	Lelê; Sorriso	Itaboraí Profute; Sampaio Corrêa	7
2021	Di Maria	Americano	6
2022	Jonathan Chula; Rhainer	Americano; Serra Macaense	6
2023	Guilherme Barrozo; Xandinho	Friburguense; Olaria	7

=== Winning managers and captains ===
Season	Manager	Captain
1991	Vanderlei Luxemburgo	Léo Júnior
1992	Joel Santana	Roberto Dinamite
1993	Alcir Portella	Geovani
1994	Wilton Xavier	Denimar
1995	Wilton Xavier	Denimar
1998	Duílio Júnior	
1999	Wilton Xavier	
2000	Marcelo Neto	
2007	Valter Ferreira	
2010	Zé Ricardo	Léo Inácio
2011	Antônio Carlos Roy	
2012	Leonardo Condé	
2019	Luciano Quadros	
2021	Gilmar Estevam	
2022	Rogério Corrêa	Luan
2023	Caio Couto	

== See also ==
- Campeonato Carioca
