= Wilton (surname) =

Wilton is a surname. Notable people with the surname include:

- Charles Henry Wilton (1761–1832), English violinist, singer, composer and teacher
- Charles Richard Wilton (1855–1927), South Australia journalist and literary editor
- Claude Wilton (1919–2008), politician, solicitor and civil rights campaigner from Northern Ireland
- Donald R. Wilton (born 1942), American electrical engineer and academic
- Ebba Wilton (1896–1951), Danish operatic soprano
- Frank Wilton (1905–1977), American football player and coach of football and baseball
- Frederick Wilton (1892–1958), British South African flying ace
- Greg Wilton (1955–2000), Australian politician
- John Wilton (disambiguation)
- Joseph Wilton (1722–1803), English sculptor, a founding member of the Royal Academy and the academy's third keeper
- Maureen Wilton (born 1953), Canadian former long-distance runner
- Michael Wilton (born 1962), American guitarist
- Nicholas Wilton (born 1978), English former cricketer
- Nick Wilton (fl. 1971–present), English actor and scriptwriter
- Nick Wilton (footballer) (born 1958), former Australian rules footballer
- Penelope Wilton (born 1946), British actress
- Robb Wilton (1881–1957), English comedian and comic actor
- Robert Wilton (1868–1925), British journalist and proponent of antisemitism and conspiracy theories
- Robert Wilton (author) (born 1973), British-Kosovan writer
- Spencer Wilton (born 1983), British equestrian
- Thomas Wilton (fl. 1288–1322), English theologian and scholastic philosopher
- William Wilton (disambiguation)
- William de Wylton (or Wilton), English chancellor of the University of Oxford (1373–1376)
