= Rodoviário Piraí Futebol Clube =

Rodoviário Piraí
- Full name: Rodoviário Piraí Futebol Clube
- Nickname: Periquito da Serra
- Founded: June 6, 1956
- Ground: Estádio Rodoviário de Piraí, Piraí, Rio de Janeiro state, Brazil
- Capacity: 5,000
Home colours	Away colours

Rodoviário Piraí Futebol Clube, commonly known as Rodoviário Piraí, is a Brazilian football club based in Piraí, Rio de Janeiro state.

== History ==
The club was founded on June 6, 1956. Rodoviário finished in the second place in the Copa do Interior in 1997, losing the competition to Duquecaxiense in the final. The club eventually closed its football department.

== Stadium ==
Rodoviário Piraí Futebol Clube plays their home games at Estádio Ênio Simões. The stadium has a maximum capacity of 5,000 people.
