= Tiago Amaral =

Brazilian footballer

Personal information
- Full name: Tiago Leite do Amaral
- Date of birth: 6 February 1985 (age 41)
- Place of birth: Rio de Janeiro, Brazil
- Height: 1.78 m (5 ft 10 in)
- Position: Forward

Team information
- Current team: Portuguesa-RJ

Senior career*
Years	Team	Apps	(Gls)
2005–2006	Cabofriense		
2007	Cachoeira		
2008–2009	Castelo Branco		
2010	Duque de Caxias		
2011–2016	Volta Redonda	12	(5)
2012	→ Aracruz (loan)	6	(0)
2013	→ Barra Mansa (loan)	0	(0)
2014	→ São Cristóvão (loan)	0	(0)
2015	→ Olaria (loan)	0	(0)
2016	→ Cuiabá (loan)	10	(4)
2017	Boavista-RJ	0	(0)
2017–2018	Portuguesa-RJ	8	(0)
2018	Uberlândia	9	(5)
2018	Goytacaz	0	(0)
2019–	Portuguesa-RJ	0	(0)
- * Club domestic league appearances and goals as of 14:49, 8 April 2019 (UTC)

Tiago Leite do Amaral (born 6 February 1985), is a Brazilian footballer who currently plays as a forward for Portuguesa-RJ.

== Club career ==
Tiago Amaral joined Portuguesa in April 2017. He was the top scorer in the 2016 Campeonato Carioca while playing for Volta Redonda.

== Career statistics ==
=== Club ===
As of 4 April 2019.

Club	Season	League			National Cup		League Cup		Continental		Other		Total	
Club	Season	Division	Apps	Goals	Apps	Goals	Apps	Goals	Apps	Goals	Apps	Goals	Apps	Goals
Volta Redonda	2011	Série D	1	1	0	0	0	0	–		0	0	1	1
Volta Redonda	2012	Série D	0	0	0	0	0	0	–		0	0	0	0
Volta Redonda	2013	Série D	0	0	0	0	15 (Note: Appearances in the Copa Rio)	8	–		0	0	15	8
Volta Redonda	2014	Série D	0	0	0	0	6	1	–		14 (Note: Appearances in the Campeonato Carioca)	4	20	5
Volta Redonda	2015	Série D	7	3	0	0	12	6	–		5	1	24	10
Volta Redonda	2016	Série D	4	1	0	0	0	0	–		17	10	21	11
Volta Redonda	Total		12	5	0	0	33	15	0	0	36	15	81	35
Aracruz (loan)	2012	Série D	6	0	0	0	0	0	–		0	0	6	0
Barra Mansa (loan)	2013	–			0	0	0	0	–		15 (Note: Appearances in the Campeonato Carioca Série B)	9	15	9
São Cristóvão (loan)	2014	–			0	0	0	0	–		17 (Note: Appearances in the Campeonato Carioca Série C)	13	17	13
Olaria (loan)	2015	–			0	0	0	0	–		6	1	6	1
Cuiabá (loan)	2016	Série C	10	4	0	0	0	0	2 (Note: Appearances in the Copa Sudamericana)	0	0	0	12	4
Boavista-RJ	2017	Série D	0	0	4 (Note: Appearances in the Copa do Brasil)	0	0	0	–		7	0	11	0
Portuguesa-RJ	2017	Série D	8	0	0	0	0	0	–		0	0	8	0
Portuguesa-RJ	2018	–			0	0	0	0	–		7	1	7	1
Portuguesa-RJ	Total		4	0	0	0	0	0	0	0	7	1	11	1
Uberlândia	2018	Série D	9	5	0	0	0	0	–		0	0	9	5
Goytacaz	2018	–			0	0	2	1	–		0	0	2	1
Portuguesa-RJ	2019	Série D	0	0	0	0	0	0	–		6	1	6	1
Career total			45	14	4	0	35	16	2	0	94	40	180	70
