= Rubro Social Esporte Clube =

Brazilian football club

Rubro Social
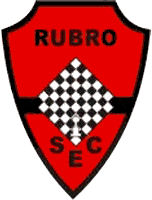
- Full name: Rubro Social Esporte Clube
- Founded: August 30, 1991; 34 years ago
- Ground: Estádio Mário Castanho, Araruama, Rio de Janeiro state, Brazil
- Capacity: 7,000
Home colors	Away colors

Rubro Social Esporte Clube, commonly known as Rubro Social, is a Brazilian football club based in Araruama, Rio de Janeiro state.

== History ==
The club was founded on August 30, 1991, after the merger of Rubro Atlético Clube and Clube de Xadrez. Rubro Social won the Copa do Interior in 1996, after beating Mesquita in the final.

== Former Players ==
(Brazil) Jacksen F. Tiago (1994)

== Honours ==
- Copa do Interior
  - Winners (1): 1996

== Stadium ==
Rubro Social Esporte Clube play their home games at Estádio Mário Castanho. The stadium has a maximum capacity of 7,000 people.
