= Football in São Paulo =

Location map of professional football clubs in the city of São Paulo

Football is the popular sport, both in terms of participants and spectators, in São Paulo. São Paulo has several of Brazil's significant football clubs, and the city is home to many football clubs.

== Clubs ==
There are many successful football clubs in São Paulo.

Football
Club	League	Venue	Established
SE Palmeiras	Série A	Allianz Parque 43,600 (39,660 record)	1914
SC Corinthians	Série A	Arena Corinthians 48,234 (63,267 record)	1910
São Paulo FC	Série A	Morumbi Stadium 67,428 (138,032 record)	1930
Portuguesa	Série C	Canindé Stadium 19,717 (25,000 record)	1920
Juventus	Campeonato Paulista Série A2	Rua Javari Stadium 7,200 (9,000 record)	1924
Nacional	Campeonato Paulista Série A3	Nicolau Alayon Stadium 9,500 (22,000 record)	1919
Barcelona EC	Campeonato Paulista Série B	Nicolau Alayon Stadium 9,500 (22,000 record)	2004

== Honours ==
- Brazil football champion
  - SE Palmeiras: (8)
  - SC Corinthians: (7)
  - São Paulo FC: (6)

== São Paulo derby ==
- Corinthians (São Paulo) vs. Palmeiras (São Paulo) The Derby Paulista
- Corinthians (São Paulo) vs. São Paulo (São Paulo) The Majestic (Majestoso)
- Palmeiras (São Paulo) vs. São Paulo (São Paulo) The King Strike (Choque-Rei)

== Stadia ==
- Pacaembu Stadium: Hosted the 1950 FIFA World Cup Opening Match
- Arena Corinthians: Hosted the 2014 FIFA World Cup Opening Match
- Allianz Parque
- Morumbi Stadium

== See also ==
- Football in Brazil
- Football in Rio de Janeiro
