= Duquecaxiense Futebol Clube =

Duquecaxiense
- Full name: Duquecaxiense Futebol Clube
- Nickname(s): Aurianil Caxiense
- Founded: January 2, 1997
- Ground: Estádio Municipal de Duque de Caxias, Duque de Caxias, Rio de Janeiro state, Brazil
- Capacity: 1,000
Home colours	Away colours	colours

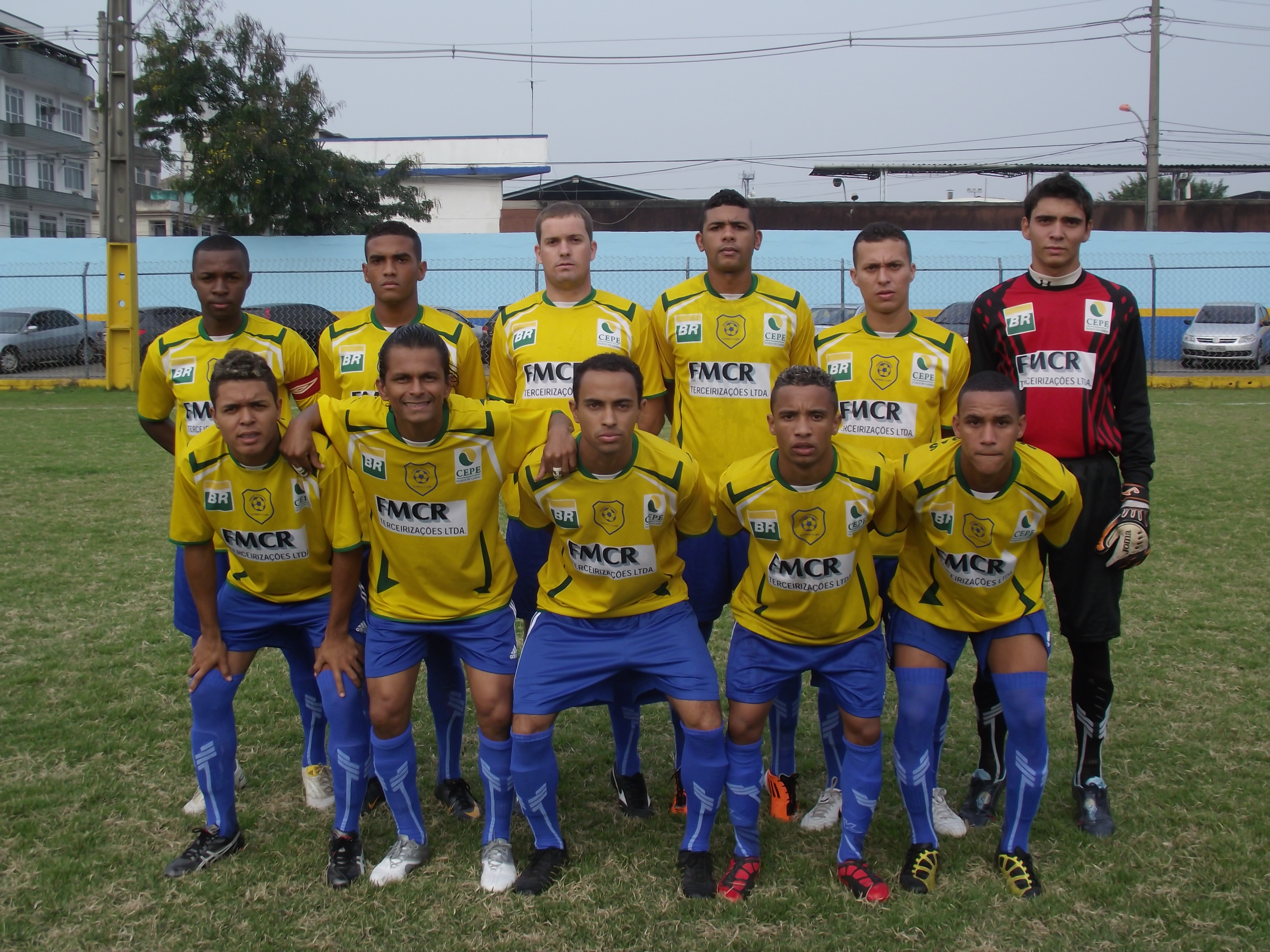
Team photo from the 2011 season

Duquecaxiense Futebol Clube, commonly known as Duquecaxiense, is a Brazilian football club based in Duque de Caxias, Rio de Janeiro state. The club was formerly known as Associação Atlética Duquecaxiense.

== History ==
The club was founded on January 2, 1997, as Associação Atlética Duquecaxiense. The club won the Copa do Interior in 1997, after beating Rodoviário Piraí in the final.

== Honours ==
- Copa do Interior
  - Winners (1): 1997

== Stadium ==
Duquecaxiense Futebol Clube play their home games at Estádio Mestre Telê Santana, commonly known as Estádio Municipal de Duque de Caxias and Estádio Maracanazinho de Duque de Caxias. The stadium has a maximum capacity of 1,000 people.
