= Football in Brazil =

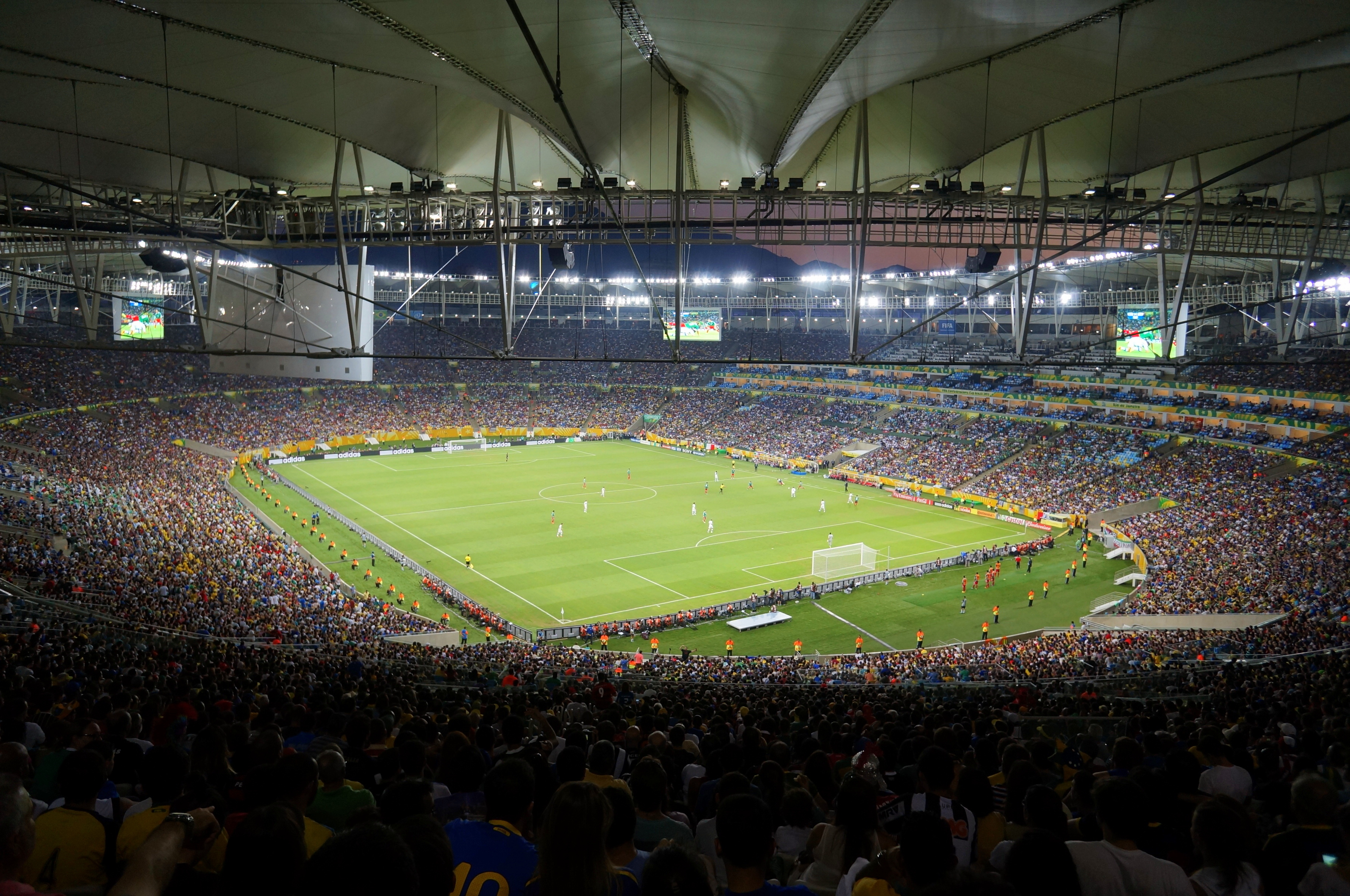
- Night view of Maracanã Stadium, June 2013.
- Country: Brazil
- Governing body: CBF
- National team: Brazil
- First played: 1894
- Registered players: 2.1 million
- Clubs: 29,208

National competitions
- Copa do Brasil

Club competitions
- Série A Série B Série C Série D State Football Leagues in Brazil There are 27 competitions.

International competitions
- FIFA World Cup; Copa América; FIFA Club World Cup; FIFA Intercontinental Cup; Copa Libertadores; Copa Sudamericana; Recopa Sudamericana

Audience records
- Single match: 199,854 (Uruguay 2–1 Brazil at Maracanã Stadium, 1950 FIFA World Cup)

Football is the most popular sport in Brazil and a prominent part of the country's national identity. Over 68% of the Brazilians are considered football fans. The Brazil national football team has won the FIFA World Cup five times, the most of any team, in 1958, 1962, 1970, 1994 and 2002. Brazil and Germany are the only teams to succeed in qualifying for all the World Cups for which they entered the qualifiers; Brazil is the only team to participate in every World Cup competition ever held. Brazil has also won an Olympic gold medal, at the 2016 Summer Olympics held in Rio de Janeiro and at the 2020 Summer Olympics in Tokyo. Brazil hosted the 1950 and 2014 FIFA World Cup. It also hosted the inaugural 2000 FIFA Club World Cup. Brazil is a country with the most comprehensively developed football in the world in both men and women as well as in both futsal and beach soccer.

Pelé has won three World Cups (he was injured during most of the 1962 World Cup), with some of the other most prominent players in football coming from Brazil, including Nílton Santos, Djalma Santos, Garrincha, Zico, Falcão, Romário, Taffarel, Rivaldo, Roberto Carlos, Ronaldo, Ronaldinho, Kaká, Neymar and Vinícius in the men's game and Marta in the women's game.

The governing body of football in Brazil is the Brazilian Football Confederation. The Brazilian Série A is one of the strongest and most-watched leagues in the world, with Palmeiras being its most successful club. The national cup competition, the Copa do Brasil, has a prestige comparable to the national league, with Cruzeiro having been its most successful club.

== History ==
Football was introduced to Brazil by Scottish immigrant Thomas Donohoe. The first football match played in Brazil was in April 1894, played on a pitch marked out by Donohoe next to his workplace in Bangu.

In the 1870s, like many other British workers, a Scottish expatriate named John Miller worked on the railroad construction project in São Paulo with other European immigrants. In 1884, Miller sent his ten-year-old son Charles William Miller to Bannister School in Southampton, England, to be educated. Charles was a skilled athlete who quickly picked up the game of football at the time when the Football League was still being formed, and as an accomplished winger and striker Charles held school honors that gained him entry into the Southampton F.C. team, and later into the county team of Hampshire.

In 1888, the first sports club was founded in the city, São Paulo Athletic Club. In 1892, while still in England, Charles was invited to play a game for Corinthian F.C., a team formed of players invited from public schools and universities. On his return to Brazil, Charles brought some football equipment and a rule book with him. He then taught the rules of the game to players in São Paulo. On December 14, 1901, the "Liga Paulista de Foot-Ball" was founded, organising its own championship, "Campeonato Paulista", first held in 1902. Therefore, Campeonato Paulista became the oldest official competition in Brazilian football. Another important club, called Società Sportiva Palestra Itália club, that was founded in 1914 played a big role in helping Italian immigrants get accustomed to Brazilian society. The club's goal was to promote "Italian identity and allegiance, helping the immigrant community to cultivate a sense of discrete ethnicity".

São Paulo Athletic Club won the first three years' Paulista championships. Miller's skills were far above his colleagues at this stage. He was given the honor of contributing his name to a move involving a deft flick of the ball with the heel "Chaleira" (the "tea-pot"). The first match played by one of Miller's teams was six months after Donohoe's.

Another competition, Campeonato Carioca, was first held in 1906 as the Rio de Janeiro State football championship, being contested up to present days.

Charles Miller kept a strong bond with English football throughout his life. After a tour of English team Corinthian F.C. to Brazil in 1910, Corinthians was established on September 1, taking on the name of the British side after a suggestion from Miller. In 1913 there were two different editions of the Campeonato Paulista. One was organized by the Associação Paulista de Esportes Atléticos (APEA) while the other one was organized by the Liga Paulista de Foot-Ball (LPF).

The Brazilian Football Confederation (CBF) was founded in 1914, but the current format for the Campeonato Brasileiro was only established in 1959.

== Football style ==
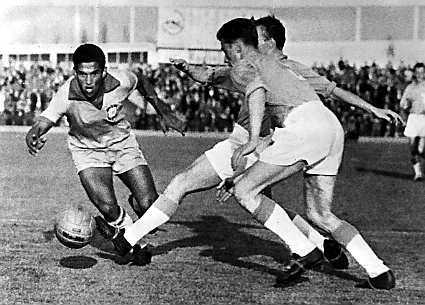
Garrincha (left), Brazilian winger and 1962 World Cup star, is regarded as one of the greatest dribblers of all time.

Brazil plays a very distinctive style, referred to as 'ginga'. For example, dribbling is an essential part of their style.

After the third title in the 1970 FIFA World Cup, Brazilian football experienced a drought of World Cup titles, which would only end in 1994. In the meantime, despite playing flashy football that enchanted the world (like the 1982 FIFA World Cup squad), the Seleção started to prioritize results-based football. Thus, since the mid-1990s, Brazilian football began to lose its characteristics. For Tostão, Brazilian football has become outdated: "The most classic example of this is that in the last 20 years Brazil has not had a single great midfield player. And this happened because there was a division in the midfield between the midfielders, who play scoring further back, and two midfielders, who play up front, close to the opponent's area. The game lost exchange of passes in that environment. The Spanish and Germans do this very well. That was the best Brazil had in my time and disappeared. We had Gérson, Rivellino, Clodoaldo, then Falcão, Toninho Cerezo. This is what Iniesta, Rakitic, Modric and Kroos did, for example, and what Xavi and Schweinsteiger did. This characteristic that the Europeans encouraged most, the Brazilians devalued. We created many area dribblers. This is just one example of how Brazilian football has gone down the wrong path."

The great exodus of players in recent years to European competitions has generated a great debate in the country, especially about the consequences this would have on the style of Brazilian football, as it could "Europeanize" the way players act.

== Brazilian team ==
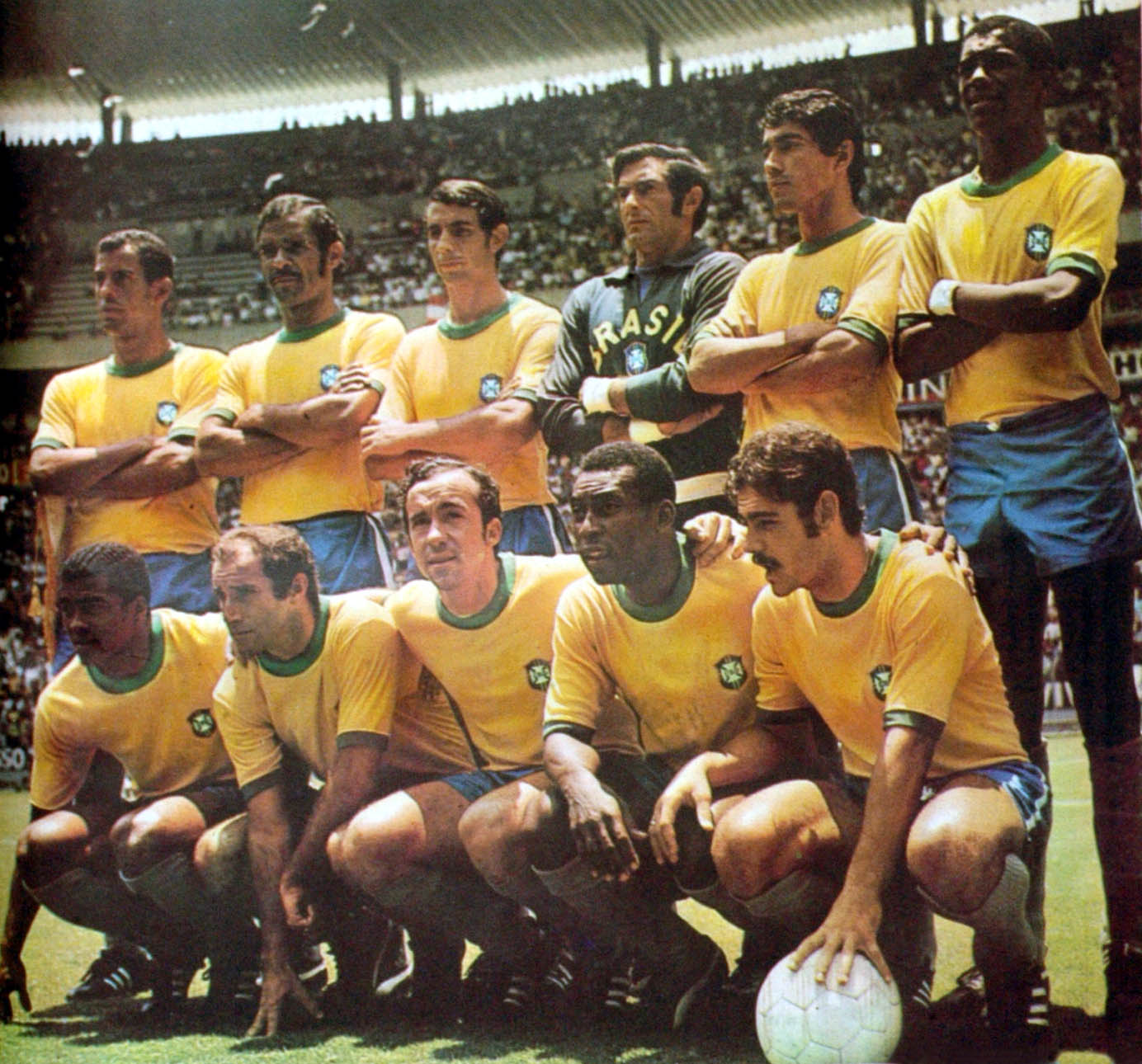
The 1970 FIFA World Cup-winning Brazil team, considered by many distinguished commentators as the greatest football team ever

The Brazil national football team is one of the main national football teams in the world. The biggest winner of the FIFA World Cup, with five titles, Brazil is known for its yellow and green shirt, with blue shorts and white socks, the four colors of the national flag. Because the shirt is predominantly yellow, the Brazilian team is also treated as the Canarinho team.

Founded on July 21, 1914, the 12th anniversary of Fluminense Football Club, the Seleção played its first game at the Laranjeiras Stadium, against the English team Exeter City. The Brazilian team is widely considered the most relevant team in world football.

The Brazilian national team also won the Copa América on eight occasions, the Confederations Cup on four, and in 2016 and 2020 won the gold medal, awarded to football champions at the Olympic Games, in the edition of the games held in Rio de Janeiro, having won three silver medals for runners-up and two bronze medals for third places.

The Brazilian team's biggest rivals are Argentina and Uruguay on the American continent. In addition to these, the Europeans, England, Italy and the Netherlands, are traditional opponents, due to the clashes held, mainly in World Cups.

== Entities ==
=== CBF ===
The Brazilian Football Confederation (CBF) is the highest sports entity in the country. It organizes all championships in the national territory and represents Brazil in international competitions between countries with the Brazilian team. It is headquartered in the city of Rio de Janeiro.

=== State federations ===
State Federations are responsible for regulating football in each State within its jurisdiction. They are inferior bodies linked to the CBF, having their own autonomy to organize championships, elect president, sign contracts and recognize clubs and associations linked to the sport.

=== Sports justice ===
The Superior Court of Sports Justice (STJD, in Portuguese) is a legal body in the field of sports in Brazil. He is responsible for judging cases involving clubs and athletes. It is common for them to participate in the daily life of Brazilian football through trials of cases of suspension due to red and yellow cards, cases of aggression or even doping. Its lower body is the Sports Justice Court (TJD, in Portuguese), which operates at state level.

== Main clubs ==
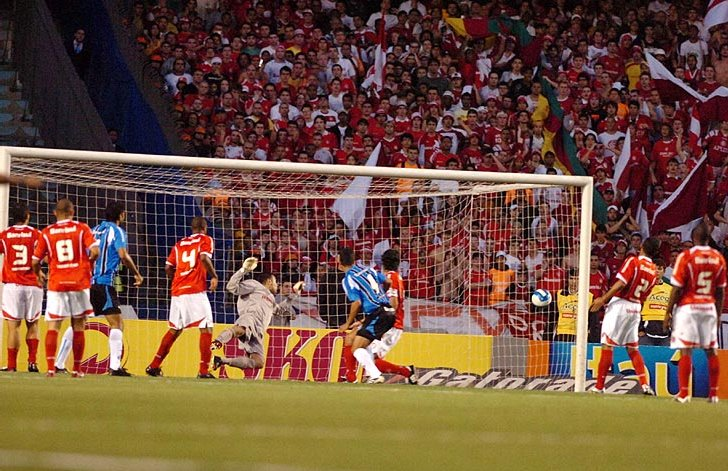
Grenal, one of the fiercest football rivalries in the world.

In Brazil, historically 12 clubs are considered the "big" clubs in Brazil (the called G-12 locally), being those: São Paulo, Palmeiras, Corinthians and Santos from the state of São Paulo; Fluminense, Flamengo, Vasco da Gama and Botafogo from the state of Rio de Janeiro; Internacional and Grêmio from the state of Rio Grande do Sul; Atlético Mineiro and Cruzeiro from the state of Minas Gerais. They are considered the most popular and successful sides in Brazilian football, having won all but six editions of the Brasileirão between them since the tournament's inception.

Apart from the G-12, others clubs are also occasionally identified as big clubs (notably in their states of origin), the biggest example being Athletico Paranaense in Paraná, mainly because of the recent campaigns of the club in national and international stage, being the only Brazilian club along with São Caetano outside of the G-12 to reach a Copa Libertadores final, with both losing all finals played (São Caetano in 2002 and Athletico Paranaense in 2005 and 2022). This makes Athletico Paranaense have enormous growth in assets and income in the 21st century, therefore being considered one of the greats of Brazilian football by much of the national press.

In addition to these thirteen mentioned, Bahia, Coritiba, Guarani and Sport, are also Brazilian champion clubs, making a total of 17 Brazilian Championship champion clubs through the history of the Brazil's main football championship.

== Calendar and competitions ==
A source of controversy in Brazil, the football calendar has over time been the target of criticism from fans, specialized journalists and even club directors. With the approval of the "Football Fan Statute" by the National Congress, changes began to transform the national calendar. According to the CBF, the intention is to make the Brazilian calendar compatible with those of European countries, to reconcile the interests of national and international football organizations.

The Brazilian season traditionally starts in January. Today, the first competition to be played by professional squads is the state championships. Previously, between the mid-1990s and 2002, regional competitions, such as the Rio-São Paulo Tournament, the Copa Sul-Minas and the Copa Nordeste, for example, were held at the beginning of the year. They involved teams from different states. However, they were extinguished, as they overwhelmed the big teams in the first half. The Copa do Brasil, played in the first half of the year, grew and gained importance. This is the only national competition that involves clubs from all states in Brazil, classified based on state tournaments from the previous year. By decision of the CBF, the Copa do Brasil now also includes the participation of teams qualified for the Libertadores da América, also played in the first half of each year. Bahia team was the first Brazilian champion, in 1959.

The Brazilian Football Championship, also popularly known as Brasileirão, has been held between May and December normally, since 2003. As it starts before the middle of each year, the championship suffers with the opening of the foreign market between July and August, causing many players move to other countries. Furthermore, its beginning takes place during the decisive phase of the Copa Libertadores and its completion is in competition with the Copa Sudamericana.

In total, a Brazilian club can end up playing around 70 matches throughout the year. There are 20 more compared to the representatives of the main European leagues, or 22 compared to their South American neighbors. First division games in the country usually take place in rounds on Wednesday and Thursday, in the evening, and Saturday and Sunday, in the afternoon.

In the past, the state and national championships, since they were created, divided the Brazilian football calendar. One competition for each semester. Furthermore, in parallel to the state competitions, there were municipal and regional competitions and, in some places, the Home Tournament, which had all its matches in just one day.

== Football culture ==
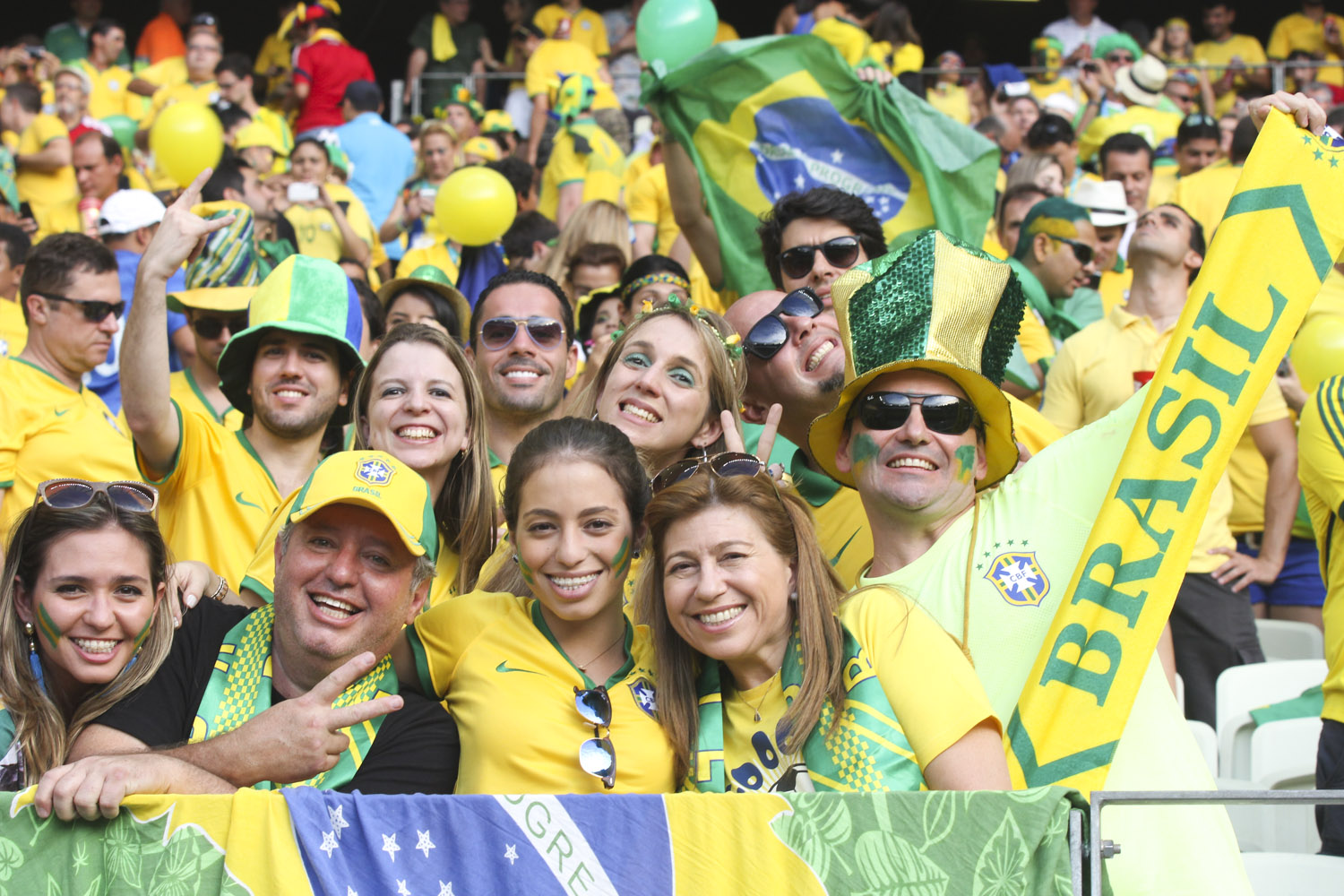
2014 FIFA World Cup

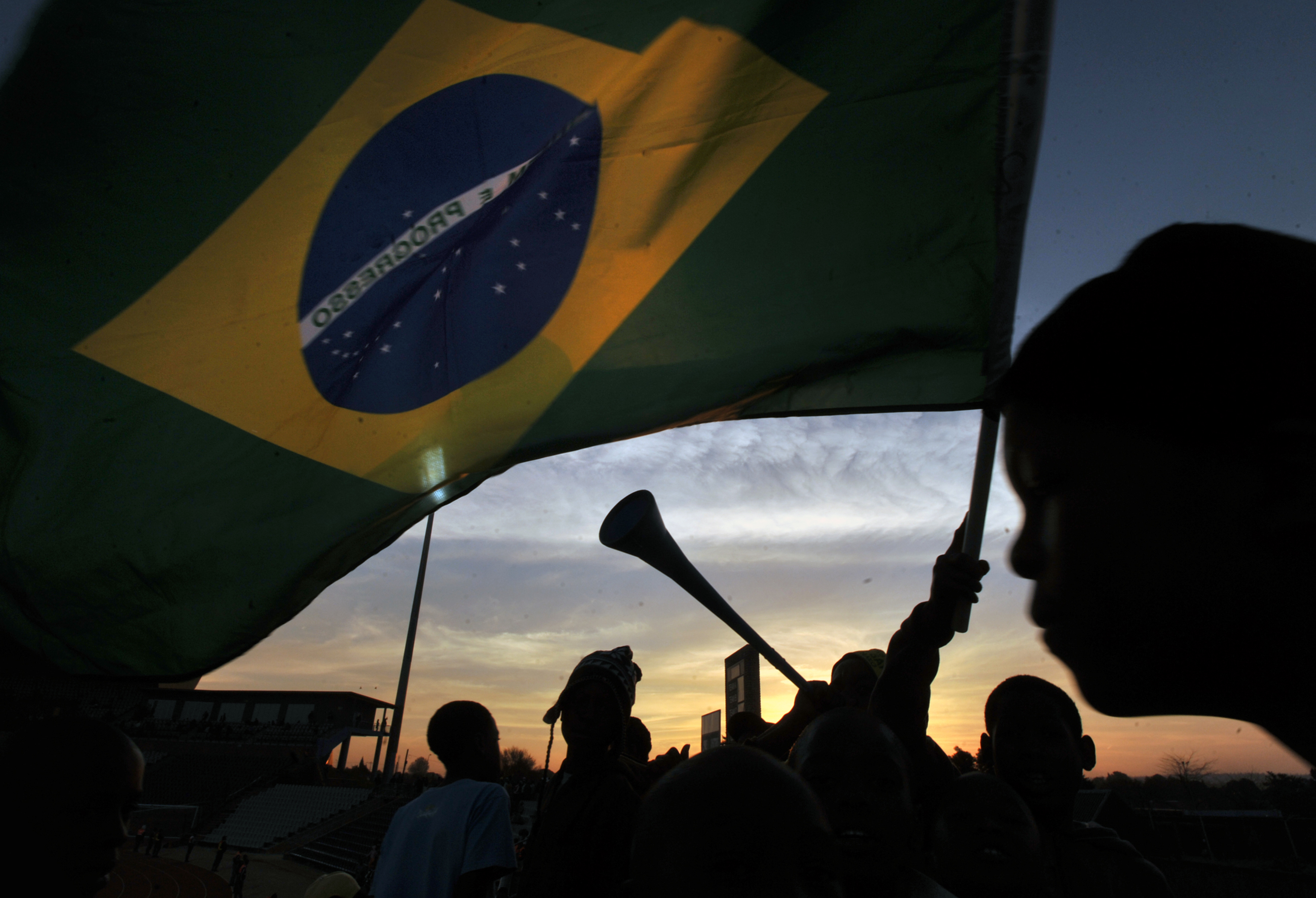
Spectators watching Brazil national football team

Football is a significant part of the Brazilian identity. It is considered the country's most significant socio-cultural activity. In this way, football is not only a sport, but also an essential part of Brazil's cultural identity. It is the most popular sport in Brazil, and Brazilians passion for the sport makes them often refer to their country as "o País do Futebol" ("the country of football").

The integration of the sport in different segments of society marked the beginning of the Brazilian football identity. The sport became part of Brazilians daily life, and with time, it also became part of the popular culture.

The biggest evidence of the importance that football has on Brazilian culture is the World Cup. Every four years, Brazilians dominate the streets, cheering and celebrating their country. The sport brings people together.

However, in recent years, with the rise of the internet, which makes it easier to follow any sport, and with Brazil's evolution in Olympic sports (the country became one of the 15 strongest in the world at the Olympic Games), the Brazilian population has been changing their tastes, and begins to become more interested in sports such as surfing, skateboarding, tennis, swimming, judo, volleyball and others, reducing the importance of football.

== Women's football ==
Women's football, unlike men's, has noticeably less popularity in the country.

The Brazilian women's national team managed to finish as runners-up at the Olympics in 2004, 2008 and 2024, and at the Women's World Cup in 2007.

Brazil will host the 2027 FIFA Women's World Cup.

Like in many countries people were not found of the idea of women playing sports. Women's football faced limitations for a lot of years. From 1941 to 1979, women weren't allowed to play football due to a government ban. This ban made it hard for women to practice the sport and develop their skill. During that time many believed that football wasn't an appropriate sport for women. Even after the ban was lifted in 1979, women's football continued to face backlash and limited support for sports organizations and the media. Female players had less opportunities and attention then the male players, despite their difficulties women continued to practice and work hard on their skills, and overtime then Brazilian woman's national tema gained more attention and resonation by major tournaments like Fifa and the Olympics.

== Brazilian football in television ==
Football is broadcast in television in the following channels:

=== Free television ===
- Rede Globo — Campeonato Brasileiro Série A, Campeonato Brasileiro Série B, Copa do Brasil, Supercopa do Brasil, Copa São Paulo de Futebol Júnior, Copa América, FIFA World Cup, FIFA Women's World Cup, FIFA Club World Cup, UEFA Euro, FIFA World Cup qualification (CONMEBOL), Campeonato Paulista, Campeonato Mineiro, Campeonato Gaúcho, Campeonato Catarinense, Campeonato Pernambucano, Campeonato Goiano, Campeonato Mato-Grossense.
- SBT — Copa Libertadores, Copa do Nordeste, Campeonato Paranaense, Campeonato Piauiense, UEFA Champions League .
- RecordTV / Record News — Campeonato Carioca, Campeonato Sergipano.
- Band — Campeonato Brasileiro Série C, Campeonato Brasileiro Feminino, Campeonato Brasileiro U-20, Copa do Brasil U-20, Serie A, Bundesliga, DFL-Supercup, Russian Premier League, Campeonato Alagoano, Campeonato Potiguar.
- TV Cultura — Copa Verde, Campeonato Paraense.
- TV Brasil — Campeonato Brasileiro Série D, Copa Verde.
- TVE Bahia — Campeonato Baiano.
- Facebook Watch (Streaming) — Copa Libertadores, UEFA Champions League, UEFA Super Cup.
- YouTube (Streaming) — UEFA Nations League, Copa do Nordeste, Campeonato Carioca, Campeonato Baiano.
- OneFootball (Streaming) — Bundesliga, 2. Bundesliga, Ligue 1, Austrian Bundesliga, UEFA Champions League qualifying, UEFA Europa League qualifying.

=== Paid television ===
- SporTV — Campeonato Brasileiro Série A, Campeonato Brasileiro Série B, Campeonato Brasileiro U-20, Copa do Brasil, Copa do Brasil U-20, Copa do Brasil U-17, Supercopa do Brasil, Florida Cup, Copa São Paulo de Futebol Júnior, Taça BH, Serie A, Taça de Portugal, Copa América, U-20 South American Championship, FIFA World Cup, FIFA Women's World Cup, FIFA U-20 World Cup, FIFA U-17 World Cup, FIFA U-20 Women's World Cup, FIFA U-17 Women's World Cup, FIFA Club World Cup, UEFA Euro, FIFA World Cup qualification (CONMEBOL), Campeonato Paulista, Campeonato Paulista Série A2, Campeonato Paulista de Futebol Feminino, Campeonato Mineiro, Campeonato Gaúcho, Campeonato Pernambucano.
- ESPN / ESPN Brasil — Campeonato Brasileiro Feminino, UEFA Europa League, UEFA Women's Champions League, La Liga, Copa del Rey, Supercopa de España, Copa de la Reina, Supercopa de España Femenina, Premier League, EFL Championship, EFL Cup, Women's FA Community Shield, DFB-Pokal, Eredivisie, Primeira Liga, Chinese Super League, J.League Cup / Copa Sudamericana Championship, Major League Soccer, U.S. Open Cup, Audi Cup, Joan Gamper Trophy, UEFA Champions League qualifying.
- Fox Sports Brasil – UEFA Europa League, Copa Libertadores, Coupe de France, Copa do Nordeste, Premier League, EFL Championship, La Liga, DFB-Pokal, Primeira Liga, Eredivisie, Chinese Super League.
- TNT Sports (TNT / Space) — Campeonato Brasileiro Série A, UEFA Champions League, Serie A, UEFA Nations League, UEFA Euro qualifying.
- BandSports — Serie A, Russian Premier League, FIFA World Cup qualification (CONMEBOL), Copa Paulista.
- Premiere (Pay-per-view) — Campeonato Brasileiro Série A, Campeonato Brasileiro Série B, Copa do Brasil, Campeonato Paulista, Campeonato Mineiro, Campeonato Gaúcho, Campeonato Pernambucano.
- Conmebol TV (Pay-per-view) — Copa Libertadores, Copa Sudamericana, Recopa Sudamericana.
- FERJ TV (Pay-per-view) — Campeonato Carioca.
- Copa do Nordeste (Pay-per-view) — Copa do Nordeste.
- DAZN (Streaming) — Campeonato Brasileiro Série C, Premier League, FA Cup, FA Community Shield, Coppa Italia, Supercoppa Italiana, Süper Lig, Major League Soccer, Liga MX, Africa Cup of Nations, CONCACAF Gold Cup.
- Estádio TNT Sports (Streaming) — Campeonato Brasileiro Série A, UEFA Champions League, Serie A, UEFA Nations League, FIFA World Cup qualification (UEFA), FIFA World Cup qualification (CONMEBOL), UEFA Euro qualifying.
- PlayPlus / R7.com (Streaming) — Campeonato Carioca.
- Nordeste FC (Streaming) — Copa do Nordeste, Campeonato Cearense.
- Paulistão Play (Streaming) — Copa São Paulo de Futebol Júnior, Campeonato Paulista Série A2, Campeonato Paulista Série A3, Campeonato Paulista Segunda Divisão, Campeonato Paulista de Futebol Feminino, Copa Paulista
- TV Walter Abrahão — Campeonato Catarinense.

== League system ==
Brazilian football clubs are affiliate to their state federations and state federations are themselves federate to Brazilian Football Confederation. As such, each state has its own league pyramid (see State Championships), Campeonato Paulista (the oldest and most traditional), Campeonato Carioca, Campeonato Mineiro, Campeonato Gaúcho being the most prominent.

There's a parallel federal pyramid. That means each club plays its state championships and only some biggest clubs play on the federal championships. Those two systems run in parallel there's no direct rank or relegation-promotion from one to the other besides state federations being responsible for appointing one to four clubs each to form each year Campeonato Brasileiro Série D. Each state set its own rule for those appointments but it's usually done through best position of the clubs on the top state tier that does not play any federal league or by a qualifying tournament, e.g. Copa Paulista is a tournament to select the fourth qualified from São Paulo (state) to Série D.

The federal system is composed of four tiers:

- Campeonato Brasileiro Série A - 20 clubs (relegates 4 to Série B)
- Campeonato Brasileiro Série B - 20 clubs (relegates 4 to Série C, promotes 4 to Série A)
- Campeonato Brasileiro Série C - 20 clubs (relegates 2 to Série D, promotes 4 to Série B)
- Campeonato Brasileiro Série D - 96 clubs (promotes 6 to Série C, 26 remain end other 64 demised). Despite the 4 relegated from last year Série C, all other 64 spots are designated by state federations by their own criteria or club ranking.

State top tiers run from January to April and federal leagues from May to December, so clubs on federal leagues can handle their state schedule without conflict. Lower state tiers run from February to November.

Although uncommon it's possible for a 'big' club to be relegated to its state second-tier league while still playing a federal league. It happened for instance to Criciúma who was relegated to 2022 Campeonato Catarinense Série B, the second-tier league on Santa Catarina pyramid, while still playing Campeonato Brasileiro Série B. They resolved the problem of schedule conflict fielding a junior team in 2022 Campeonasto Catarinense Série B. Many of the states championships have their own promotion/relegation system.

== Largest Brazilian football stadiums ==
Stadiums with a capacity of 40,000 or higher are included.

#	Stadium	Capacity	City	State	Tenants	Image
1	Maracanã	73,193	Rio de Janeiro	Rio de Janeiro	Flamengo, Fluminense	
2	Mané Garrincha	69,910	Brasília	Federal District	Brasília FC	
3	Mineirão	66,658	Belo Horizonte	Minas Gerais	Cruzeiro	
4	Morumbi	66,435	São Paulo	São Paulo	São Paulo FC	
5	Arruda	60,044	Recife	Pernambuco	Santa Cruz	
6	Arena Castelão	57,876	Fortaleza	Ceará	Ceará, Fortaleza EC	
7	Parque do Sabiá	56,450	Uberlândia	Minas Gerais	Uberlândia EC	
8	Arena do Grêmio	55,662	Porto Alegre	Rio Grande do Sul	Grêmio	
9	Mangueirão	53,635	Belém	Pará	Paysandu, Clube do Remo	
10	Beira-Rio	49,055	Porto Alegre	Rio Grande do Sul	Internacional	
11	Arena Fonte Nova	47,915	Salvador	Bahia	EC Bahia	
12	Arena Corinthians	47,252	São Paulo	São Paulo	Corinthians	
13	Prudentão	45,954	Presidente Prudente	São Paulo	Grêmio Prudente	
14	Arena Pernambuco	45,440	São Lourenço da Mata	Pernambuco	Retrô	
15	Nilton Santos	45,000	Rio de Janeiro	Rio de Janeiro	Botafogo	
16	Albertão	44,200	Teresina	Piauí	Flamengo-PI, River Atlético Clube	
17	Allianz Parque	43,713	São Paulo	São Paulo	Palmeiras	
18	Arena da Amazônia	42,924	Manaus	Amazonas	Amazonas, Manaus FC, Nacional	
19	Arena Pantanal	42,788	Cuiabá	Mato Grosso	Cuiabá EC, Dom Bosco	
20	Arena da Baixada	42,372	Curitiba	Paraná	Athletico Paranaense	
21	Serra Dourada	42,000	Goiânia	Goiás		
22	Couto Pereira	40,502	Curitiba	Paraná	Coritiba FC	
23	Pacaembu	40,199	São Paulo	São Paulo		
24	Castelão	40,149	São Luís	Maranhão	Sampaio Corrêa	

== See also ==
- Archie McLean
- Charles William Miller
- Football in Rio de Janeiro
- Football in São Paulo
- List of football clubs in Brazil
