= Holy Trinity Ukrainian Greek Orthodox Church =

Historic church in North Dakota, United States

- U.S. National Register of Historic Places
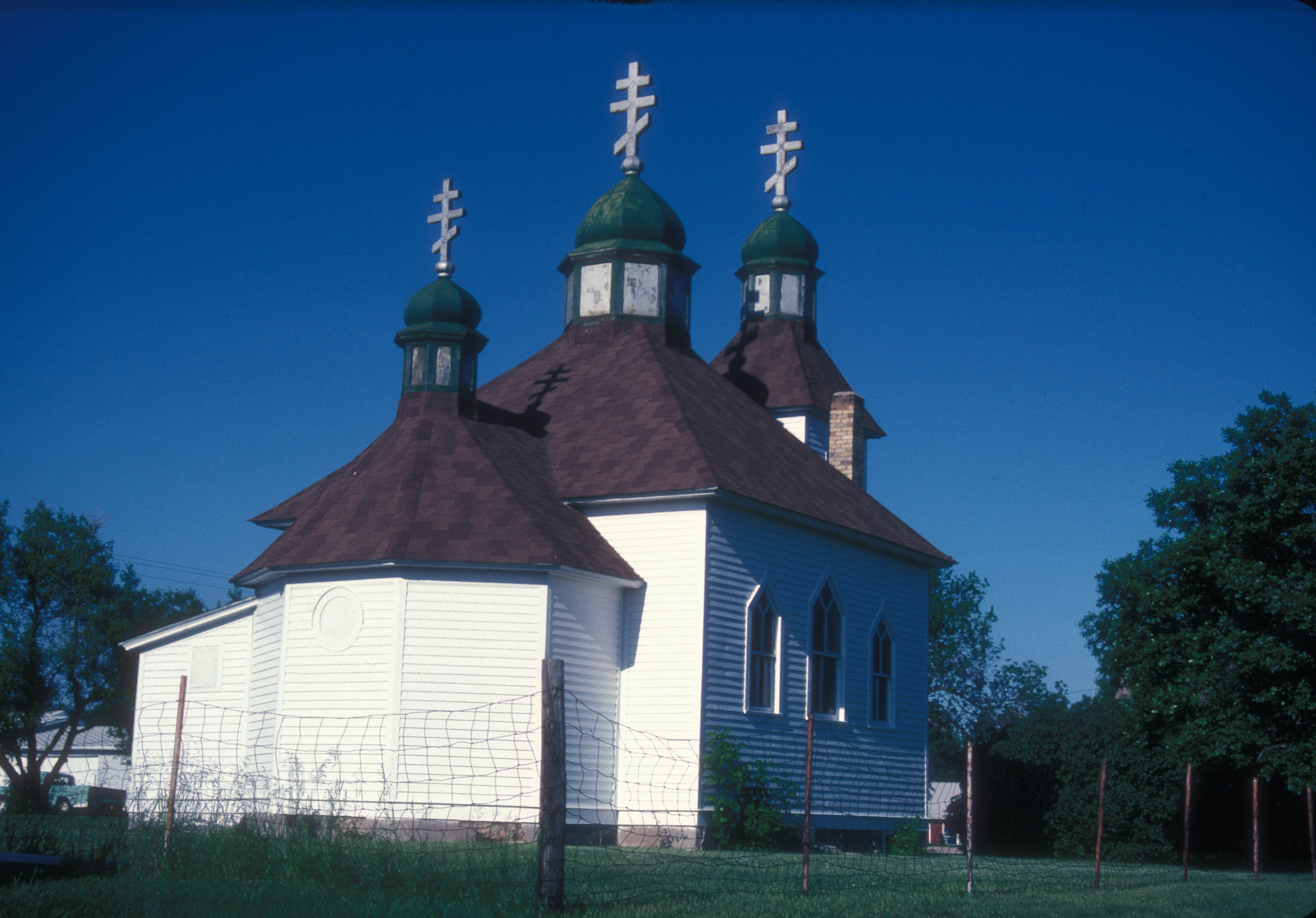

- Location within North Dakota Location within the United States
- Interactive map of Holy Trinity Ukrainian Greek Orthodox Church
- Location: Bismarck Ave. and 6th St., Wilton, North Dakota
- Coordinates: 47°9′35″N 100°47′24″W
- Area: less than one acre
- Built: 1913
- Built by: John Krivatski, John Schowchuk
- Architectural style: Byzantine
- NRHP reference No.: 82001344
- Added to NRHP: October 22, 1982

The Holy Trinity Ukrainian Greek Orthodox Church in Wilton, North Dakota, was built in 1913 to serve the local Eastern Orthodox Ukrainian immigrants in the area. It was listed on the National Register of Historic Places (NRHP) in 1982.

As of the NRHP nomination, the church no longer had regular services, as was the case for the other two historic Ukrainian Greek Orthodox churches in North Dakota. As of 2024, the church is still closed.

== History ==
In 1897, a group of Ukrainians immigrated from Galicia to Canada before settling in the Wilton, North Dakota, area. Orthodox worship services were initially carried out in private homes. In 1913, funding was secured to build a church. Two local carpenters, John Krivatski and John Schowchuk, oversaw the construction.

As of the time of the NRHP listing in 1981, the church no longer held regular services, and it is still closed today. The two other Ukrainian Greek Orthodox churches in North Dakota, St. Peter and Paul in Belfield and St. Pokrova near Killdeer, also no longer hold services.

== See also ==
- National Register of Historic Places listings in North Dakota
