= Wilton (given name) =

Wilton is a masculine given name which is borne by:

- Wilt Chamberlain (1936–1999), American Hall-of-Fame basketball player and actor
- Wilton R. Earle (1902–1964), American cell biologist
- Wilton Felder (1940–2015), American saxophone and bass player
- Wílton Figueiredo (born 1982), Brazilian footballer
- Wilton Graff (1903–1969), American actor
- Wilton Ivie (1907–1969), American arachnologist
- Wilton Lackaye (1862–1932), American stage and film actor, originator of the role of Svengali on both stage and screen
- Wilton Mkwayi (1923–2004), South African activist and politician
- Wilton Lockwood (1861–1914), American painter
- Wilton López (born 1983), Nicaraguan former Major League Baseball pitcher
- Wilton Love (1861–1933), Australian medical doctor, surgeon and x-ray pioneer
- Wilton Persons (1896–1977), American military officer and White House Chief of Staff for President Dwight D. Eisenhower
- Wilton Rebolo (born 1995), Brazilian rugby union player
- Wilton Sampaio, Brazilian football referee
- Wilton Simpson (born 1966), American politician
- Wilton Speight (born 1994), American football player
- Wilton Cezar Xavier (1947–2009), aka Wilton (footballer), Brazilian football midfielder and manager
