= Wilton, North Dakota =

- City
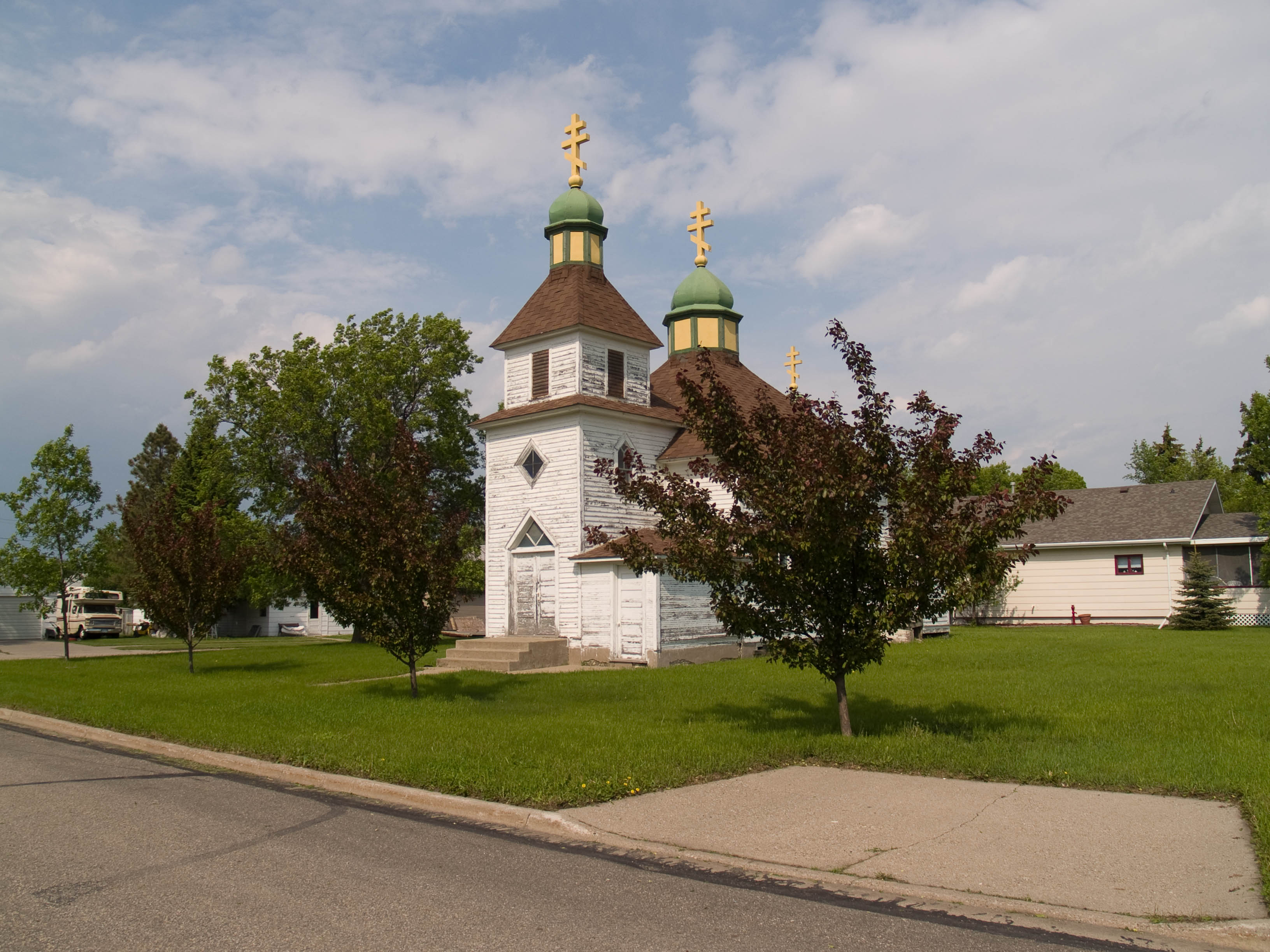
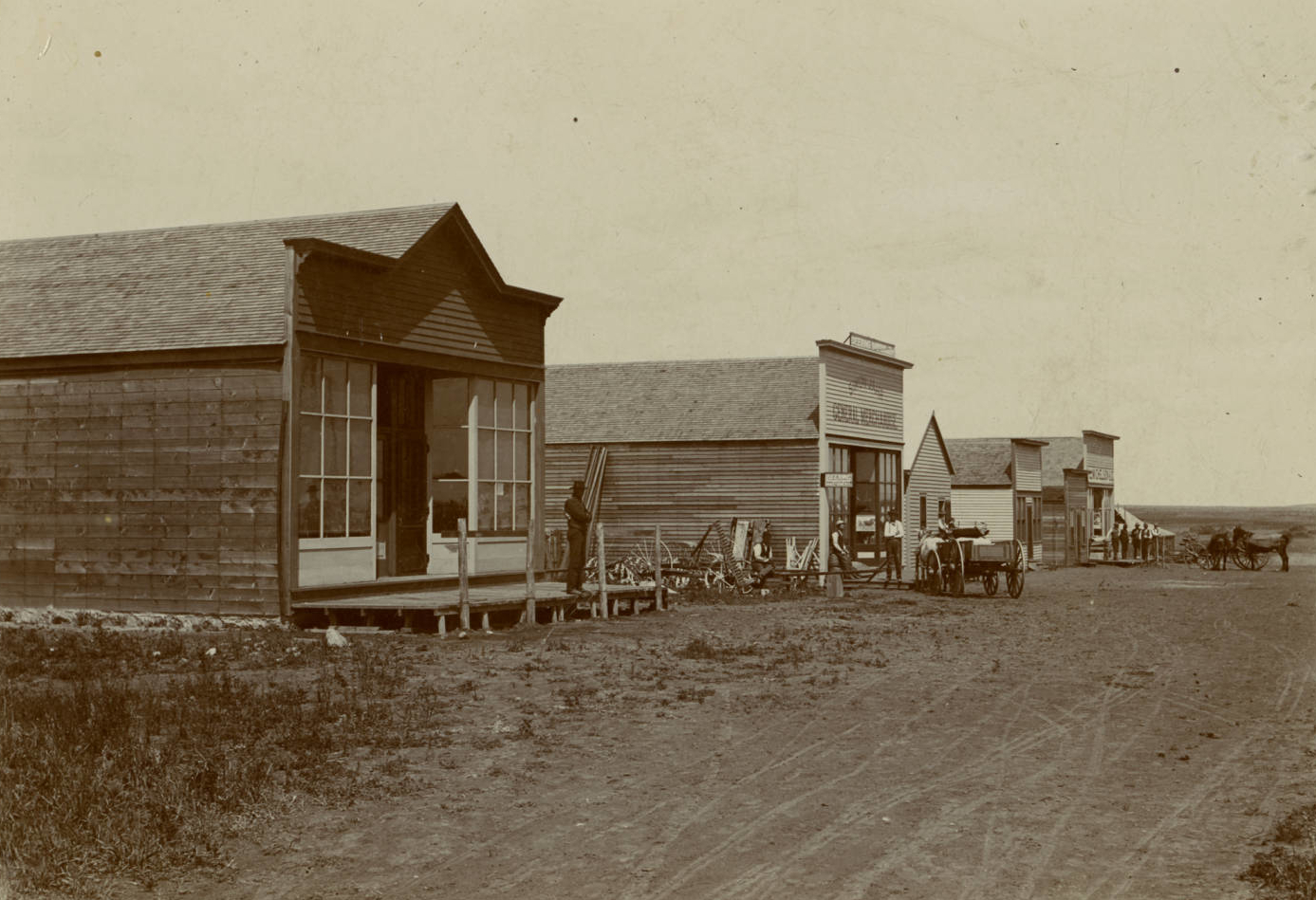
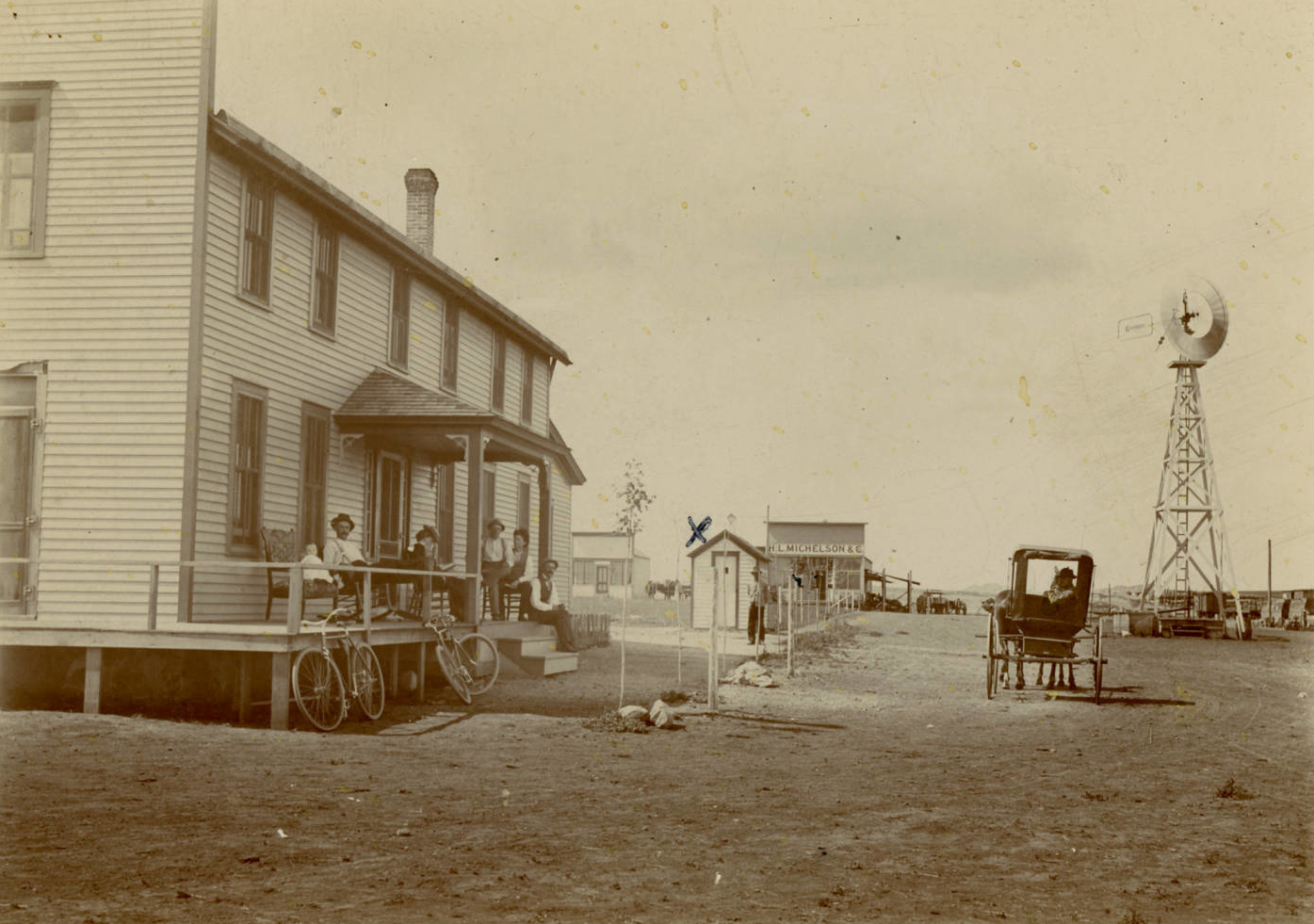
- Holy Trinity Ukrainian Greek Orthodox Church in Wilton Main Street in Wilton, North Dakota, 1890s Hotel and general store in Wilton, North Dakota, 1890s

- Seal
- Motto: "A city rich in its past and future..."
- Interactive map of Wilton, North Dakota
- Location within North Dakota
- Coordinates: 47.1579°N 100.7844°W
- Country: United States
- State: North Dakota
- Counties: McLean, Burleigh
- Founded: 1899
- Named for: General W. D. Washburn

Government
  - Type: Mayor–council
  - Mayor: LeeAnn Domonoske-Kellar
  - Commissioners: Jim Tooke; Lisa Hedstrom; Bernell Hedstrom; Mike Schmit

Area
  - Total: 0.568 sq mi (1.471 km^{2})
  - Land: 0.556 sq mi (1.439 km^{2})
  - Water: 0.012 sq mi (0.031 km^{2}) 2.11%
- Elevation: 2,172 ft (662 m)

Population (2020)
  - Total: 718
  - Estimate (2025): 702
  - Density: 1,290/sq mi (499/km^{2})
- Time zone: UTC–6 (Central (CST))
  - Summer (DST): UTC–5 (CDT)
- ZIP Code: 58579
- Area code: 701
- FIPS code: 38-86580
- GNIS feature ID: 1036337
- Website: wiltonnd.org

Wilton is a city in Burleigh and McLean Counties, North Dakota, United States. It is part of the Bismarck, North Dakota Metropolitan Statistical Area or Bismarck-Mandan. The population was 718 as of the 2020 census, and was estimated at 702 in 2025. Wilton was named by General W. D. Washburn after the town of Wilton in his native state of Maine.

== History ==
Wilton was founded in 1899 when the railroad was extended to that point. The city was named after Wilton, Maine, the native home of an early settler. The Wilton Train Station was completed in 1900 and the post office has been in operation at Wilton also since 1900. Wilton was originally built up chiefly by Ukrainians.

== Geography ==
According to the United States Census Bureau, the city has a total area of 0.568 square miles (1.47 km^{2}), of which 0.556 square miles (1.44 km^{2}) is land and 0.012 square miles (0.03 km^{2}) (2.11%) is water.

=== Climate ===
This climatic region is typified by large seasonal temperature differences, with warm to extremely hot (and often humid) summers and severely cold winters. According to the Köppen Climate Classification system, Wilton has a humid continental climate, abbreviated "Dfb" on climate maps.

== Demographics ==
Historical population
Census	Pop.	Note	%±
1910	437		—
1920	108		−75.3%
1930	149		38.0%
1940	117		−21.5%
1950	134		14.5%
1960	105		−21.6%
1970	116		10.5%
1980	262		125.9%
1990	728		177.9%
2000	807		10.9%
2010	711		−11.9%
2020	718		1.0%
2025 (est.)	702		−2.2%
U.S. Decennial Census; 2020 Census

According to realtor website Zillow, the average price of a home as of June 30, 2026, in Wilton was $260,205.

As of the 2024 American Community Survey, there were 292 estimated households in Wilton with an average of 1.98 persons per household. The city has a median household income of $80,000. Approximately 6.8% of the city's population lives at or below the poverty line. Wilton has an estimated 60.6% employment rate, with 23.1% of the population holding a bachelor's degree or higher and 87.1% holding a high school diploma. There were 339 housing units at an average density of 609.71 per square mile (235.4/km^{2}).

The top five reported languages (people were allowed to report up to two languages, thus the figures will generally add to more than 100%) were English (92.9%), Spanish (7.0%), Indo-European (0.0%), Asian and Pacific Islander (0.2%), and Other (0.0%).

The median age in the city was 47.5 years.

Wilton, North Dakota – racial and ethnic composition Note: the US Census treats Hispanic/Latino as an ethnic category. This table excludes Latinos from the racial categories and assigns them to a separate category. Hispanics/Latinos may be of any race.
Race / ethnicity (NH = non-Hispanic)	Pop. 2000	Pop. 2010	Pop. 2020	% 2000	% 2010	% 2020
White alone (NH)	792	683	644	98.14%	96.06%	89.69%
Black or African American alone (NH)	1	0	0	0.12%	0.00%	0.00%
Native American or Alaska Native alone (NH)	4	12	25	0.50%	1.69%	3.48%
Asian alone (NH)	0	1	1	0.00%	0.14%	0.14%
Pacific Islander alone (NH)	0	0	3	0.00%	0.00%	0.42%
Other race alone (NH)	0	0	2	0.00%	0.00%	0.28%
Mixed race or multiracial (NH)	7	6	30	0.87%	0.84%	4.18%
Hispanic or Latino (any race)	3	9	13	0.37%	1.27%	1.81%
Total	807	711	718	100.00%	100.00%	100.00%

=== 2020 census ===
As of the 2020 census, there were 718 people, 302 households, and 191 families residing in the city. The population density was 1,291.37 inhabitants per square mile (498.6/km^{2}). There were 345 housing units at an average density of 620.50 per square mile (239.6/km^{2}). The racial makeup of the city was 89.83% White, 0.00% African American, 3.48% Native American, 0.14% Asian, 0.42% Pacific Islander, 0.97% from some other races and 5.15% from two or more races. Hispanic or Latino people of any race were 1.81% of the population.

=== 2010 census ===
As of the 2010 census, there were 711 people, 317 households, and 188 families residing in the city. The population density was 1,125.00 inhabitants per square mile (434.4/km^{2}). There were 358 housing units at an average density of 566.46 per square mile (218.7/km^{2}). The racial makeup of the city was 96.34% White, 0.00% African American, 2.11% Native American, 0.14% Asian, 0.00% Pacific Islander, 0.56% from some other races and 0.84% from two or more races. Hispanic or Latino people of any race were 1.27% of the population.

There were 317 households, of which 24.3% had children under the age of 18 living with them, 47.6% were married couples living together, 6.3% had a female householder with no husband present, 5.4% had a male householder with no wife present, and 40.7% were non-families. 35.0% of all households were made up of individuals, and 12.3% had someone living alone who was 65 years of age or older. The average household size was 2.17 and the average family size was 2.79.

The median age in the city was 46.7 years. 19.7% of residents were under the age of 18; 7.4% were between the ages of 18 and 24; 20.8% were from 25 to 44; 32.9% were from 45 to 64; and 19.3% were 65 years of age or older. The gender makeup of the city was 53.2% male and 46.8% female.

=== 2000 census ===
As of the 2000 census, there were 807 people, 309 households, and 219 families residing in the city. The population density was 1,395.3 inhabitants per square mile (538.7/km^{2}). There were 347 housing units at an average density of 599.9 per square mile (231.6/km^{2}). The racial makeup of the city was 98.27% White, 0.12% African American, 0.74% Native American, 0.00% Asian, 0.00% Pacific Islander, 0.00% from some other races and 0.87% from two or more races. Hispanic or Latino people of any race were 0.37% of the population.

There were 309 households, out of which 37.9% had children under the age of 18 living with them, 57.6% were married couples living together, 9.1% had a female householder with no husband present, and 29.1% were non-families. 23.9% of all households were made up of individuals, and 12.6% had someone living alone who was 65 years of age or older. The average household size was 2.57 and the average family size was 3.04.

In the city, the population was spread out, with 28.5% under the age of 18, 6.8% from 18 to 24, 27.5% from 25 to 44, 22.1% from 45 to 64, and 15.1% who were 65 years of age or older. The median age was 37 years. For every 100 females, there were 93.5 males. For every 100 females age 18 and over, there were 93.0 males.

The median income for a household in the city was $34,583, and the median income for a family was $39,063. Males had a median income of $28,750 versus $20,833 for females. The per capita income for the city was $17,111. About 8.0% of families and 10.8% of the population were below the poverty line, including 12.2% of those under age 18 and 17.1% of those age 65 or over.

== Education ==
The area is served by the Wilton Public School District. It operates the Wilton School. In the 2025-26 academic year, the district reported a total of 270 students.
