= William Wilton (disambiguation) =

William Wilton was a football manager.

William Wilton may also refer to:

- William de Wylton (also Wilton), English 14th century college Fellow and university chancellor
- William McConnell Wilton (fl. 1937–1953), Northern Irish Unionist politician and footballer
- William Wilton (MP) for Reading (UK Parliament constituency) 1413 and 1423
