= Rondinelli =

Rondinelli is a surname. Notable people with the surname include:

- Antônio Rondinelli (born 1954), former Brazilian footballer who played as a central defender
- Arnaldo "Spider" Rondinelli (1935-2017), American jazz drummer
- Bobby Rondinelli (born 1955), American rock drummer
- Dennis A. Rondinelli (1943–2007), American professor and researcher of public administration
- Francesco Rondinelli (1589–1665), Florentine scholar and academic
- Jackson Rondinelli (born 1994), Brazilian diver
- Niccolo Rondinelli (c. 1468 – c. 1520), Italian painter of the Renaissance period

== See also ==
- Rondinelli da Silva Vieira (born 1999), Brazilian footballer
- Rondinelly (born 1991), Brazilian footballer who plays as an attacking midfielder
