= Football in Rio de Janeiro =

Location map of professional football clubs in the city of Rio de Janeiro

Football is the most popular sport, both in terms of participants and spectators, in Rio de Janeiro. Rio de Janeiro has several of Brazil's significant football clubs, and the city is home to many football clubs.

== History ==
Rio de Janeiro has a long football history

Maracanã Stadium, It was the main home venue of the Brazil national football team. Since 2007, Nilton Santos stadium is an important venue.

== Clubs ==
There are many successful football clubs in Rio de Janeiro:

Club	League	Venue	Established (team)
Botafogo	Campeonato Brasileiro Série A	Estádio Nilton Santos 46,931 (43,810 record)	1894
Flamengo	Campeonato Brasileiro Série A	Maracanã 78,838 (173,850 record)	1895
Fluminense	Campeonato Brasileiro Série A	Maracanã 78,838 (173,850 record)	1902
Vasco da Gama	Campeonato Brasileiro Série A	São Januário 19,717 (40,209 record)	1898
Madureira	Campeonato Brasileiro Série D	Estádio Aniceto Moscoso 5,400 (10,762 record)	1914
Bangu	Campeonato Brasileiro Série D	Estádio Moça Bonita 9,564 (17,000 record)	1904
Portuguesa	Campeonato Brasileiro Série D	Estádio Luso Brasileiro 15,000 (18,725 record)	1924
Bonsucesso	Campeonato Carioca Série A	Estádio Leônidas da Silva 13,000 (13,571 record)	1913
America	Campeonato Carioca Série B	Estádio Giulite Coutinho 13,544 (9,861 record)	1904

There are also other clubs in Rio de Janeiro state

- Americano
- Angra dos Reis
- Boavista
- Cabofriense
- Campo Grande
- Casimiro de Abreu
- Duque de Caxias
- Estácio de Sá
- Friburguense
- Goytacaz
- Nova Iguaçu
- Olaria
- Serrano
- São Cristóvão
- Volta Redonda

There were some other club, which are now extinct, in Rio de Janeiro:

- Football and Athletic
- Haddock Lobo
- Mangueira
- Paissandu
- Riachuelo
- Rio Cricket
- Syrio e Libanez
- Villa Isabel

== Club derbies ==
=== Big Four derbies ===
- Botafogo (Rio de Janeiro) vs. Flamengo (Rio de Janeiro) – Clássico da Rivalidade (The Rivalry Derby)
- Botafogo (Rio de Janeiro) vs. Fluminense (Rio de Janeiro) – Clássico Vovô (The Grandpa Derby), so-called because it is the oldest derby played in Brazil
- Botafogo (Rio de Janeiro) vs. Vasco (Rio de Janeiro) – Clássico da Amizade (The Friendship Derby)
- Flamengo (Rio de Janeiro) vs. Fluminense (Rio de Janeiro) – Fla-Flu (The Fla-Flu)
- Flamengo (Rio de Janeiro) vs. Vasco (Rio de Janeiro) – O Clássico dos Milhões (The Classic of Millions), or simply O Clássico (The Classic)
- Fluminense (Rio de Janeiro) vs. Vasco (Rio de Janeiro) – Clássico dos Gigantes (The Giants Derby)

=== Other derbies ===
- America-RJ (Rio de Janeiro) vs. Bangu (Rio de Janeiro) – Clássico Bisavô (The Great-grandfather Derby), or Clássico Alvirrubro (The Red-and-white Derby)
- America-RJ (Rio de Janeiro) vs. Vasco (Rio de Janeiro) – Clássico da Paz (The Peace Derby)
- Americano (Campos dos Goytacazes) vs. Goytacaz (Campos dos Goytacazes) – Goyta-Cano (The Goyta-Cano), or Clássico da Baía de Campos (The Campos Bay Classic)

== Stadiums ==
- Maracanã Stadium: Hosted the 1950 FIFA World Cup Final and 2014 FIFA World Cup Final

== Supporters ==
Football clubs from Rio de Janeiro are among the best-supported football clubs in Brazil. The following table compares the average home league attendance of the Rio de Janeiro clubs with that of other clubs in the Brazilian top flight during the 2026 season. The clubs from Rio de Janeiro are shown in bold.

Pos	Club	Games	Average attendance
1	**Flamengo**	15	62,523
2	Corinthians	15	37,846
3	Bahia	15	33,828
4	Cruzeiro	15	33,097
5	Grêmio	15	30,617
6	Palmeiras	14	29,164
7	São Paulo	14	28,162
8	Atlético Mineiro	15	26,115
9	Athletico Paranaense	15	25,900
10	Remo	15	25,414
11	**Fluminense**	15	24,561
12	Coritiba	14	24,222
13	Internacional	15	22,294
14	Vitória	15	18,695
15	**Vasco da Gama**	15	18,131
16	**Botafogo**	15	15,878
17	Santos	14	13,830
18	Chapecoense	14	11,882
19	Mirassol	15	6,031
20	Red Bull Bragantino	15	4,126

== See also ==
- Football in Brazil
- Football in São Paulo
