= Nick Wilton (footballer) =

Australian rules footballer

Personal information
- Full name: Nicholas Wilton
- Born: 24 February 1958 (age 68)
- Original team: Old Xaverians
- Height: 192 cm (6 ft 4 in)
- Weight: 86 kg (190 lb)
- Position: Key-position

Playing career^{1}
Years	Club	Games (Goals)
1978–1981	Hawthorn	13 (7)
- ^{1} Playing statistics correct to the end of 1981.

Nicholas Wilton (born 24 February 1958) is a former Australian rules footballer who played with Hawthorn in the Victorian Football League (VFL).

== Biography ==
Wilton, the son of a diplomat, spent much of his teenage life living in London. Although he boarded at Xavier College in Kew, inside Hawthorn's zone, as his residence was in London he was not affected by zoning. As a result, both Melbourne and St Kilda tried to recruit him to their clubs, in addition to Hawthorn. Wilton was playing at this time for Old Xaverians in VAFA. In the end he opted for Hawthorn, as they were the more dominant side of that era.

A key-position player, Wilton started at Hawthorn in the 1978 VFL season, a premiership winning year. He debuted in Hawthorn's round nine win over St Kilda at Moorabbin Oval, his only senior appearance for the season. In 1979 he played nine games for Hawthorn in a season that was interrupted by a knee injury, which required an operation. Following a knee reconstruction, Wilton returned late in the 1980 season to play two games.

During his time at Hawthorn, Wilton was also a medical student, which by 1981 was proving too difficult a combination. In his fifth year, he was required as part of his studies to live in a hospital and work long shifts. He had to swap shifts with other students in order to attend training. In the 1981 VFL season he played just one senior game for Hawthorn. He was advised by the Dean of Medicine that he would have to give up football if he wanted to continue and he made the decision to retire from the VFL.

In 1983 he returned to Old Xaverians and spent five seasons at the club. He finished second in the Woodrow Medal in 1984.

Wilton now works as a radiologist in Melbourne.
