= Assumpção =

Assumpção is a surname of Portuguese origin. Notable people with this surname include:

- Anelis Assumpção, Brazilian singer-songwriter
- Itamar Assumpção, Brazilian songwriter and composer
- Leandro Assumpção, Brazilian footballer
- Mateus Vital (born Mateus da Silva Vital Assumpção), Brazilian footballer
