= John Wilton =

John Wilton may refer to:

== Politicians ==
- John W. Wilton (1879–1942), Canadian soldier and politician
- John Wilton (Australian politician) (1925–2002), Member of the Victorian Legislative Assembly for Broadmeadows
- Sir John Wilton (diplomat) (1921–2011), UK Ambassador to Kuwait and Saudi Arabia
- John Wilton (MP), MP for Hereford

== Others ==
- Sir John Wilton (general) (1910–1981), Australian general
- John Raymond Wilton (1884–1944), Australian-born mathematician
- John Wilton established Wilton's Music Hall in London c.1850

== See also ==
- Jack Wilton, main character in The Unfortunate Traveller
