= Wilton station (North Dakota) =

Former Soo Line depot in North Dakota, USA

Wilton
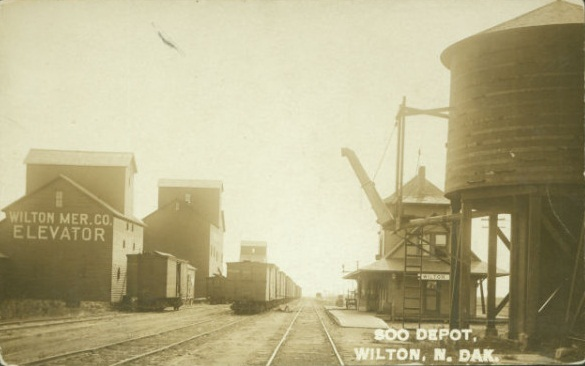
- Soo Line Depot, c. 1914

General information
- Location: 1st Street N, Wilton, North Dakota 58579
- System: Former Soo Line passenger rail station

History
- Rebuilt: 1900

Services
Preceding station	Soo Line	Following station
Baldwin toward Bismarck	Bismarck – Max	Merida toward Max
- Minneapolis, St. Paul and Sault Sainte Marie Railroad Company Depot
- U.S. National Register of Historic Places
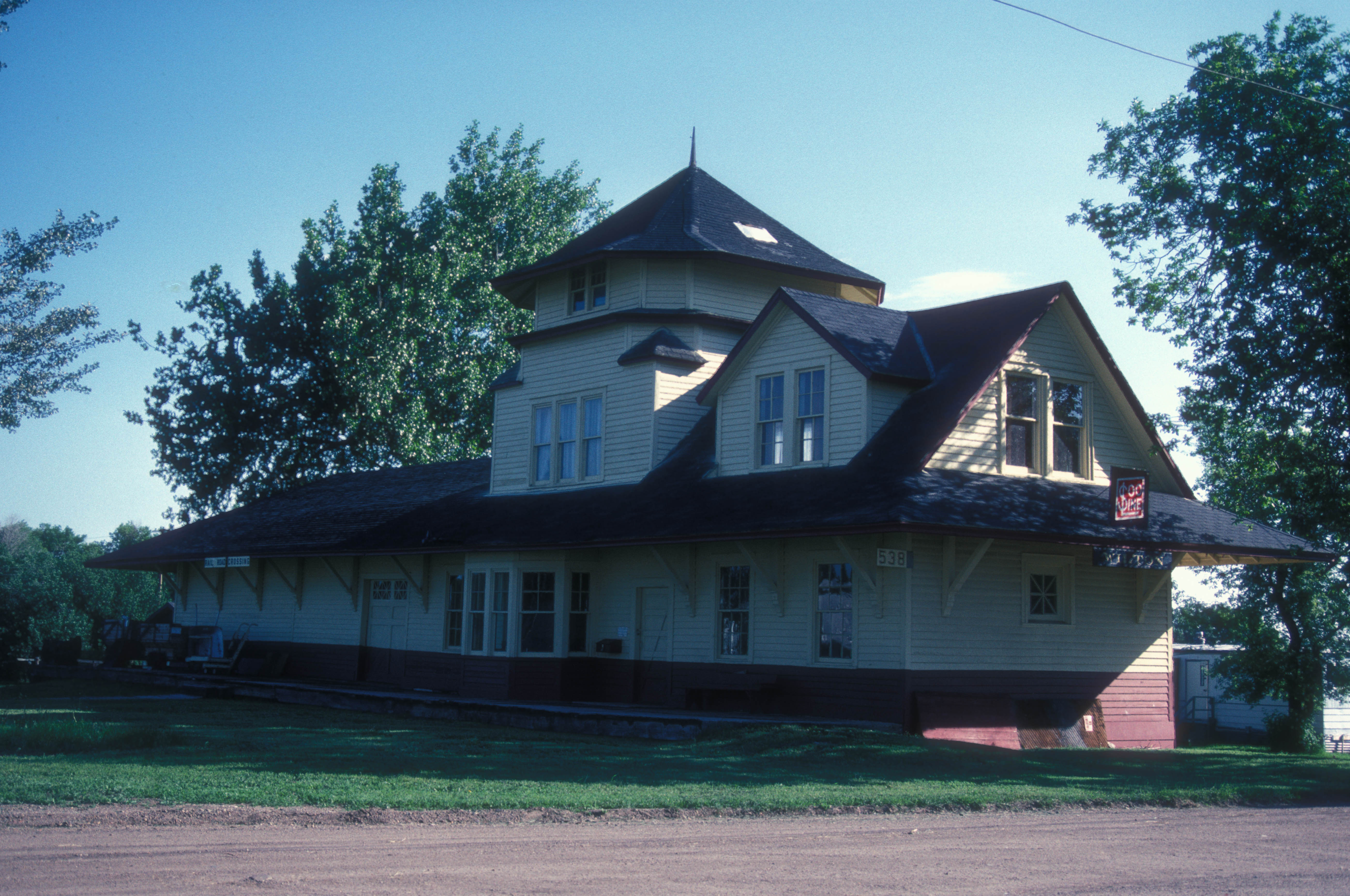
- Depot in 2007

- Location within North Dakota Location within the United States
- Location: 1st St. and McLean Ave., Wilton, North Dakota
- Coordinates: 47°9′32″N 100°46′59″W
- Area: less than one acre
- Built: 1900
- Architect: Keith, William J.
- NRHP reference No.: 78003079
- Added to NRHP: March 29, 1978
Location

Wilton station in Wilton, North Dakota, USA, was built in 1900 by the Minneapolis, St. Paul and Sault Ste. Marie Railroad. Designed by William J. Keith, it was listed on the National Register of Historic Places in 1978 as the Minneapolis, St. Paul and Sault Sainte Marie Railroad Company Depot. It is also known as Soo Line Depot.

According to its NRHP nomination, the station "is historically significant for its association with William Drew Washburn (1831-1912). It is architecturally distinctive for its incorporation of a pagoda-like tower within what is otherwise a conventional design for a railroad structure."
