= Wilton (footballer) =

Brazilian footballer

Personal information
- Full name: Wilton Cezar Xavier
- Date of birth: October 13, 1947
- Place of birth: Belo Horizonte, Brazil
- Date of death: December 13, 2009 (aged 62)
- Place of death: Volta Redonda, Brazil
- Position: Midfielder

Youth career
- 1965–1967: Fluminense

Senior career*
Years	Team	Apps	(Gls)
1967–1975	Fluminense	193	(18)
1972–?	São Paulo	20	(?)
?	Santa Cruz	41	(4)
?	Coritiba	61	(8)
?	Vitória	?	(?)
?	Toronto Blizzard (Canadá)	?	(?)
?	Náutico	?	(?)
?	Leônico-BA	?	(?)
?	Galícia-BA	?	(?)

Managerial career
- 1988–1993: Volta Redonda (youthteams)
- 1994–1996: Volta Redonda
- 1999–2000: Volta Redonda
- 2002–2003: Volta Redonda
- * Club domestic league appearances and goals

Wilton Cezar Xavier was a Brazilian footballer who achieved notoriety in Brazil after scoring, with his hand and in offside position, a decisive goal for Fluminense in a Fla-Flu match on October 13, 1968. Throughout his career, Wilton also played for São Paulo, Santa Cruz, Coritiba and Vitória. Wilton played for several Campeonato Brasileiro Série A clubs. He died on December 13, 2009, in the city of Volta Redonda, aged 62.
