= Alex Oliveira (disambiguation) =

Alex Oliveira is a Brazilian mixed martial artist.

Alex Oliveira may also refer to:

- Alex Oliveira (footballer, born 1974), full name Alex de Oliveira Freitas, Brazilian football midfielder
- Alex Oliveira (footballer, born 1978), full name Alexsandro Marques de Oliveira, Brazilian football defender
