= History of SC Corinthians Paulista =

Sport Club Corinthians Paulista is a football club based in São Paulo, São Paulo state, Brazil. For an overview of the club, see Sport Club Corinthians Paulista.

== Foundation and humble beginnings (1910–1912) ==
In 1910, the football in Brazil was an elitist sport. The top clubs were formed by people who were part of the upper classes. Among them were Club Athletico Paulistano, São Paulo Athletic Club (not to be confused with São Paulo Futebol Clube) and Associação Atlética das Palmeiras (not to be confused with Sociedade Esportiva Palmeiras). Lower class society excluded from larger clubs founded their own minnow clubs and only played "floodplain" football.

Bucking the trend, a group of five workers of the São Paulo Railway, more precisely Joaquim Ambrose and Anthony Pereira (wall painters), Rafael Perrone (shoemaker), Anselmo Correia (driver) and Carlos Silva (general laborer), residents of the neighborhood of Bom Retiro. It was on 31 August 1910, when these workers were watching a match featuring a London-based club touring Brazil, Corinthians FC. After the match, while the group returned home, the men spoke of partnerships, business ideas, and general dreams of grandeur. In the mind of each one surfaced a great idea: the foundation of a club. After several exchanges in a lively argument, a common ground led those athletes to the same dream. The arguments led to the conclusion that they would meet the next day to make a dream into reality.

On 1 September 1910, in anticipation of heavy rains, the group agreed to meet after sundown in public sight. That night at 8:30 pm, on Rua José Paulino, known as "Rua dos Imigrantes" (or 'Immigrants Street'), the five workers reunited alongside their guests and neighbors from Bom Retiro, underneath the glow of an oil lamp. On that night, the club was founded, and its board of directors elected Miguel Bataglia as the first club president.

On 5 September 1910, at 8 pm at the residence of President Bataglia, the discussion on a club name began. The first ideas for the name of the club were full of Brazilian national spirit: Carlos Gomes Football Club and Futebol Clube Santos Dumont. However, these prominent Brazilian names were put aside after the English amateur team they had witnessed a few days earlier Corinthian F.C., which donned pink and brown shirts and won all six games in São Paulo and Rio de Janeiro during an exhibitional tour of Brazil. The name Sport Club Corinthians Paulista, was chosen as an homage to the great British club.

It was then that President Bataglia declared "Corinthians will be a team of the people, by the people and for the people," a belief that was a response in contrast to the previous "elite-only" football culture in Brazil at the time. The belief stood, and still stands to this day with Corinthians being known as the "Time do Povo" or the "Team for the People".

To buy the first ball, a bill traveled all over the neighborhood, it was necessary raise Rs$6000 to acquire the main instrument of the team. Directors board policy stated that only club associates could donate. This promoted many to officially join the club and forgo their morning coffee to aid the club. Nickel by nickel the money slowly trickled in. Fortune struck when the donations of Rs$200 and a mountain of pennies was all that was required to secure the ball.

A regulation football was bought by the directors for two hundred réis from a shop located at Rua de São Caetano, signifying that a new approach was being taken to ensure increased accessibility of the sport in the São Paulo floodplain. This effort helped minimize the socio-economic discrimination in relation to Paulista football, making it possible for various social classes to be involved in the sport. Before then, football in the area had been dominated mainly by elite social classes.

Corinthians played their first match on 10 September 1910, away against União da Lapa, a respected amateur club in São Paulo; and despite being defeated by 1–0, this match would mark the beginning of a successful era as an amateur club.

On 14 September, Luis Fabi scored Corinthians' first goal against Estrela Polar, another amateur club in the city, and Corinthians won their first game 2–0.

== Early years (1910–1922) ==
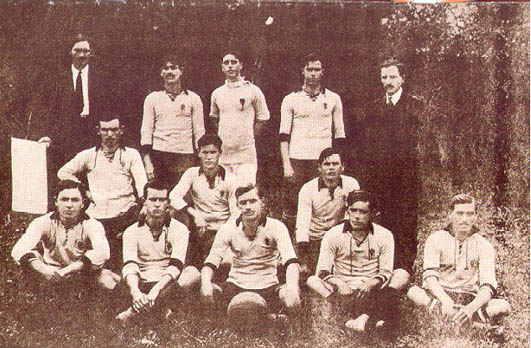
The Corinthians squad that won its first title in 1914.

Fúlvio, Casemiro do Amaral and Casemiro Gonzalez; Police, Biano and Cesar; Aristides, Peres, Amilcar, Dias and Neco.

Corinthians played their first match on September 10, 1910, playing away against União da Lapa, a respected amateur club in São Paulo, and despite being defeated by 1–0, this match would mark the beginning of a successful age as an amateur club.

On September 14, Luis Fabi scored Corinthians' first goal, against Estrela Polar, another amateur club in the city, and Corinthians won their first game by 2–0.

With good results and an ascending number of supporters, Corinthians joined the Liga Paulista, after winning two qualifying games, and played in the São Paulo State Championship for the first time, in 1913, and just one year after joining the league, Corinthians was crown champion for the first time, in 1914 and again two years later.

There were many fly by night teams popping up in São Paulo at the time, and during the first practice held by Corinthians a banner was placed by the side of the field stating "This One Will Last"

== Becoming Great (1922–1939) ==
The year of 1922, the Centennial of Brazilian Independence, marks the start of Corinthians hegemony in the São Paulo State Championship.

Because football in Brazil was primarily concentrated in Rio de Janeiro and São Paulo during those years, the champions of those two states were generally recognized as the country's top clubs. By defeating América, the reigning Rio de Janeiro state champion Corinthians established its position among the leading teams in Brazil.

The same year also marked the first of three State Championships in a row, something that happened again in 1928–1930 and 1937–1939.

== Ups and downs (1940–1954) ==
Corinthians seemed predestinate to only be three State Champion in a row, since after to be six years without being a champion, came back to win of 1937 the 1939, but the 1940s were a difficult time. The club would win a championship in 1941 and later it would only come back to be successful in 1951. It was a time when Corinthians was known as “it makes me laugh” or "faz-me rir " in Portuguese.

The beginning of the decade of 1950 made history in Corinthians and the São Paulo Championship. In 1951, the team composed of Carbone, Cláudio, Luisinho, Baltasar and Mário marked 103 goals in thirty matches of the São Paulo Championship, registering an average of 3,43 per game. Carbone was the top goalscorer of the competition with 30 goals. It would also win the São Paulo Championship of 1952 and 1954.

In this same decade, Corinthians was champion three times of the Rio-São Paulo Championship (1950, 1953 and 1954) the tournament that starts to be the championship of most importance in the country, because counted on the participation of the greatest clubs of the two states that were more blunted in the country.

In 1953, in a championship carried through in Venezuela, Corinthians won the Small Goblet of the World, a championship that many consider as a precursor of the Worldwide Championship of Clubs. In the occasion, Corinthians, substituting Vasco da Gama, went to Caracas, Venezuelan capital and conquered six consecutive victories, against the teams of A.S. Roma (1–0 and 3–1), CF Barcelona (3–2 and 1–0) and Selection of Caracas (2–1 and 2–0). It would also conquer the Goblet of IV the Centenarian of São Paulo, in the same year of 1954.

But after the headings of the São Paulo Championship and the Rio-São Paulo of 1954, Corinthians would live great lack of titles. The breakthrough finally came when they won the São Paulo state championship in 1977, breaking a string of 23 years without a major title.

== National success and world champions (1990–2005) ==
In 1990, Corinthians won its first Campeonato Brasileiro Série A, beating its rivals, São Paulo in the final at the opponent's own stadium, Estádio do Morumbi. In the following year, Corinthians beat Flamengo and won the Supercopa do Brasil. In 1995, the club won the Copa do Brasil for the first time, beating Grêmio in the final at Estádio Olímpico Monumental, in Porto Alegre. In the same decade, the club won the state championship in 1995, 1997, and in 1999, and won the national championship again in 1998 and in 1999.

In 2000, Corinthians won the first edition of the FIFA Club World Cup, beating Vasco in the final, at Estádio do Maracanã. To reach the final, Corinthians finished ahead of Real Madrid of Spain, Al-Nasr of Saudi Arabia and Raja Casablanca of Morocco. In the same decade, the club won the state championship in 2001 and in 2003., and the Copa do Brasil in 2002, beating Brasiliense in the final.

Between 1990, and 2005, the club also won the Ramón de Carranza Trophy in 1996, the Rio-São Paulo Tournament in 2002, the São Paulo Youth Cup in 1995, 1999, 2004, and 2005, and the Dallas Cup in 1999 and 2000.

== MSI Ownership (2005–2007) ==
The club's situation in early 2004, was among the most difficult in its history. Bad administration, lack of money and terrible campaigns both in the 2003 Brazilian Championship and in the 2004 São Paulo State Championship caused its millions of supporters to worry. Fortunately, some young players and a new manager by the name of Adenor Leonardo Bacchi, known as Tite helped the team to improve from their terrible start. At the end of the championship, Corinthians finished in 5th place and gained entry to the Copa Sudamericana, the second highest tournament in South American football, for 2005. They would, however, end up losing to eventual runners-up Pumas UNAM in the quarterfinals.

This situation prompted Corinthians' president, who at the time was Alberto Dualib, to convince the club's advisors to sign a deal with an international fund of investors called Media Sports Investment. The deal sparked controversy, and it granted the company a large amount of control over the club for 10 years in exchange for large financial investments in return. This has brought many quality players to the team, such as Carlos Tevez, Roger, Javier Mascherano and Carlos Alberto.

Despite the MSI investments, Corinthians had a slow start in the 2005 São Paulo state championship, but managed to improve as the tournament progressed, eventually managing to finish second. Their start to the Brazilian championship during 2005 was difficult, too, but after Daniel Passarella's immediate dismissal due to an unexpected 5–1 loss to Corinthians' rivals, São Paulo, the club finished the championship well, and were eventually crowned Brazilian Champions for the fourth time after some controversial annulment of eleven games due to a betting scandal.

The relationship between Corinthians' managers and the MSI president, Kia Joorabchian was not good, and after being eliminated by River Plate in the eighth-finals of the 2006 Copa Libertadores, the club began to a crisis that was responsible for the bad performances for the rest of 2006. This was also compounded by the fact that the night they were eliminated from the 2006 Libertadores, there was an incident in which ardent, upset Corinthians fans began to start an avalanche and attempted to invade the pitch in the middle of the 2nd leg played at the Pacaembu stadium. The team finished ninth in the Brazilian league that year.

2007 was considered to be the absolute nadir for Corinthians, as the club boasted lacklustre results early on in the São Paulo state, Brazilian league, and Copa Sudamericana tournaments, ultimately losing to Botafogo in the Sudamericana preliminary round. In the Brazilian league, the club managed to accumulate a 10-game winless run, which ended at a home game victory over Goiás.

On 2 December 2007, following a 1–1 draw in an away match at Grêmio, Corinthians were relegated to the second division for the first time in the team's history. Three coaches took turns at coaching the team, and they were Emerson Leão, Paulo Cesar Carpegiani, and Nelsinho Baptista, all providing similar results.

As a result of their financial woes, Corinthians lost their main shirt sponsor, which at the time was Samsung, scheduled to appear on their shirts via a multi-year deal. This marked an end of an era for Corinthians, and it was evident that the club needed to start from scratch. To aid this, MSI and Kia Joorabchian parted ways with Corinthians at the end of 2007.

Financial and on-field performance declines were compounded by the departures of key players, namely Mascherano and Tevez to West Ham United in a controversial move, leaving Corinthians without a major on-field performer, and costing the club millions.

== 2008: The Comeback Year ==
Corinthians, who won promotion to the top division of Brazilian football for 2009, by winning the Serie B tournament, signed with three-time FIFA Player of the Year Ronaldo.

== Second Club World Cup Championship ==
The club won the Série A for the fifth time in 2011. Corinthians beat Cruz Azul of Mexico, Club Nacional of Paraguay and Deportivo Táchira of Venezuela in the Group Stage of the 2012 Copa Libertadores, then they beat Emelec of Ecuador in the Round of 16, Rio de Janeiro-based club Vasco da Gama in the Quarterfinals and fellow São Paulo state team Santos in the Semifinals. On July 4, after reaching the final of the 2012 Copa Libertadores undefeated, Corinthians won its first title after a two-match final against six-time champions Boca Juniors by drawing 1–1 in Argentina and accomplishing an inaugural victory at the Estádio do Pacaembu in São Paulo winning 2–0, becoming the ninth Brazilian team to win the Copa Libertadores. After this historical title, Corinthians is considered the most valuable club in Brazil.

Corinthians won the 2012 FIFA Club World Cup for the second time after defeating in the Semifinals Al-Ahly of Egypt 1–0 on December 12, 2012, and beating in the Final English club Chelsea 1–0 on December 16, 2012. Cássio was awarded the cup's Golden Ball while Peruvian Paolo Guerrero was awarded the Bronze Ball.

== See also ==
- Sport Club Corinthians Paulista in international football
