= SC Corinthians Paulista in international football =

Sport Club Corinthians Paulista in international football
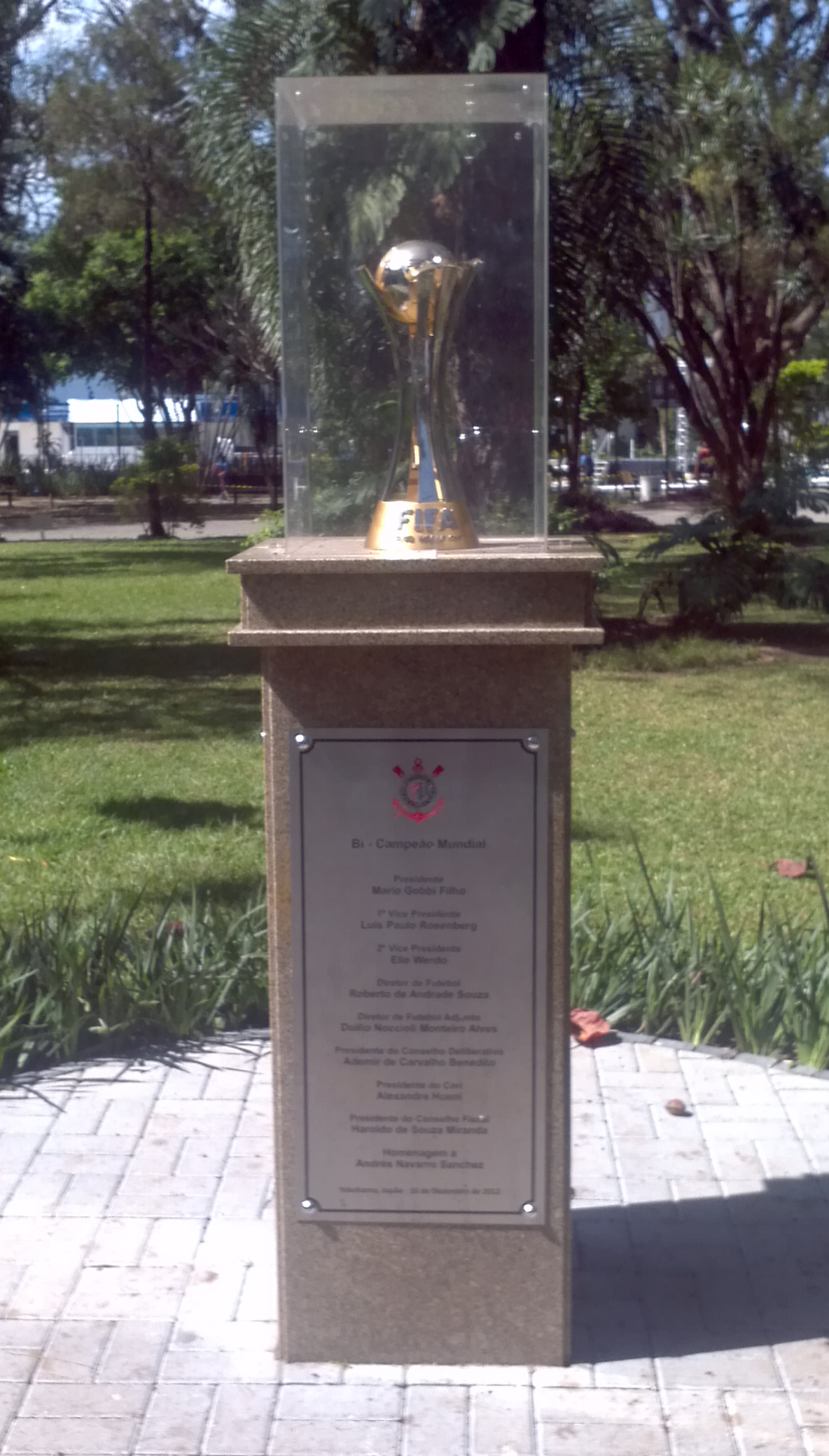
- Corinthians lifted the Fifa Club World Cup (pictured) in 2000 and 2012.
- Club: Sport Club Corinthians Paulista
- Seasons played: 25
- First entry: 1977 Copa Libertadores
- Latest entry: 2022 Copa Libertadores

Titles
- Copa Libertadores: 1 (2012)
- Recopa Sudamericana: 1 (2013)
- FIFA Club World Cup: 2 (2000, 2012)

Corinthians, an association football team based in São Paulo, is one of the most successful Brazilian clubs in international competitions. They have won two FIFA Club World Cup titles (in 2000 and 2012) the most for any club outside Europe, one Copa Libertadores (in 2012) and one Recopa Sudamericana (in 2013), for a total of four international trophies.

Their first participation in international competitions came in 1977, when they qualified for the 18th edition of the Copa Libertadores as the domestic league runner-up. Corinthians then debuted in the Copa Conmebol in 1994, followed by the inaugural editions of the Copa Mercosur and the FIFA Club World Cup in 1998 and 2000, respectively. In 2003, they also competed in the Copa Sudamericana, the successor to the Copa Conmebol.

With their victory in the 2000 FIFA Club World Championship, Corinthians became the first team to win this FIFA competition. As South American champions in 2012, they contested their second FIFA Club World Cup and their first Recopa Sudamericana, winning both trophies in these appearances. Until 2012, Corinthians were the only club among São Paulo's "Big Four" yet to win South America's premier club competition—Santos, São Paulo, and Palmeiras had won the Copa Libertadores in 1962, 1992, and 1999, respectively.

== History ==
=== Early decades (1977–99) ===
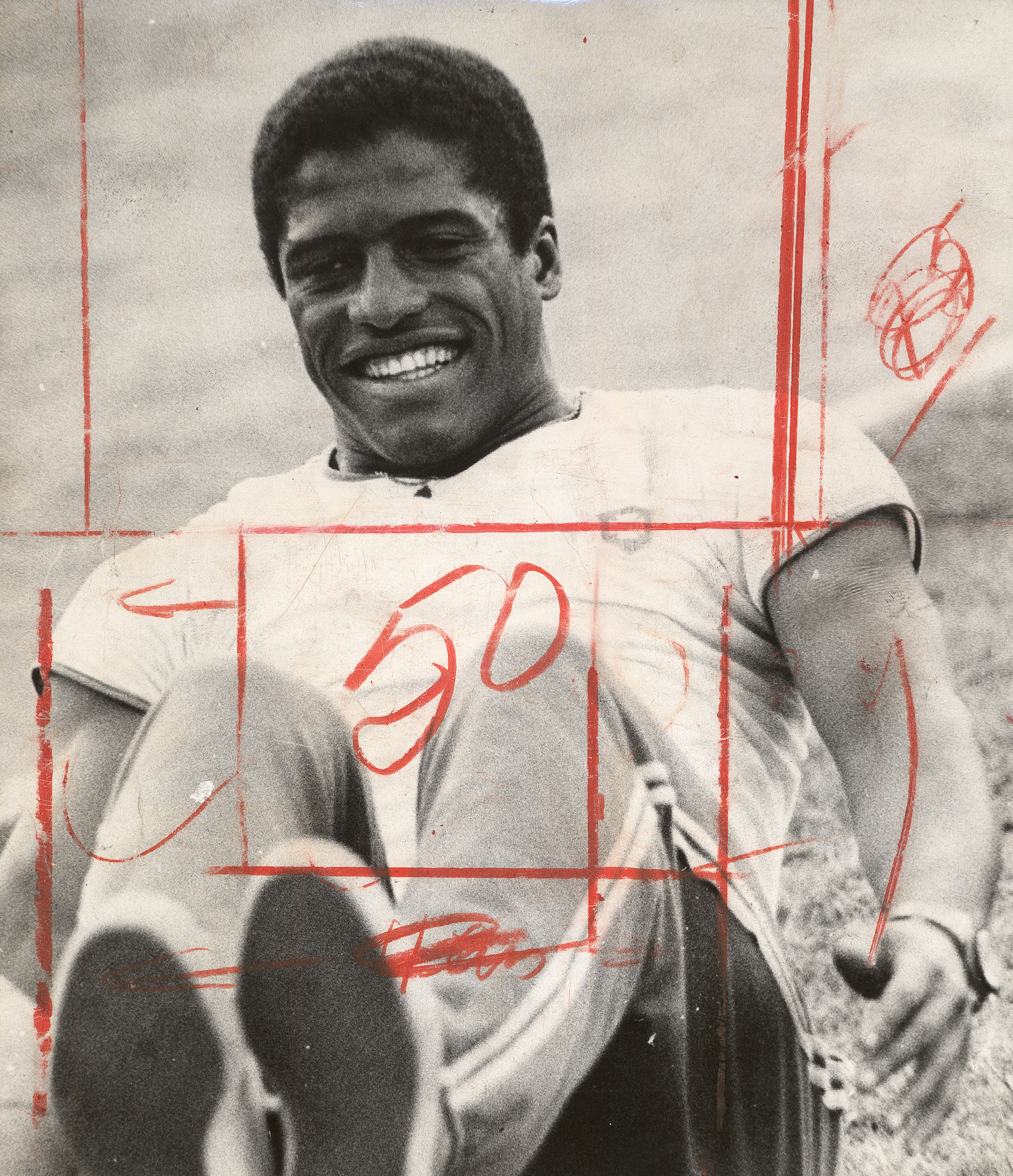
Zé Maria (pictured) scored the first goal of Corinthians in official international matches in the history.

Corinthians first participated in international club competitions in 1977, when they took part in the group stage of the 18th edition of the Copa Libertadores – the highest level of competition in South American club football – as the runners-up in the previous year's Brazilian championship. Their debut was against Internacional, a club that had beaten Corinthians four months earlier in the 1976 national championship finals, at Morumbi Stadium. Right-back Zé Maria scored the first international goal in the club’s history. After a 1–1 draw against Internacional, the team, led by coach Osvaldo Brandão, was defeated 2–1 in both of their away matches against El Nacional and Cuenca, respectively, and suffered a 1–0 defeat to the then Brazilian champions. With no possibility of advancing to the next stage, Corinthians secured their first two victories against Cuenca and El Nacional and finished their debut South American campaign in third place in their group.

After a 14-year hiatus, Corinthians participated in their second Libertadores in 1991, this time as the Brazilian national football champions. Coached by Nelsinho Baptista and led by midfielder Neto, Corinthians were placed in a group with Flamengo, Nacional de Montevideo and Bella Vista, where they finished as the runner-up. Paired with Boca Juniors in the round of 16, they were beaten 3–1 in the first leg at La Bombonera and were eliminated after a 1–1 draw in the second leg at Morumbi Stadium, with 65,791 spectators in attendance. Two seasons later, Corinthians participated in their first Copa Conmebol in 1994. Coached by Jair Pereira, they made it to the semifinals, where they were defeated by São Paulo, the eventual competition winners, in a penalty shootout after each team won a game. Corinthians returned to the tournament the following season, but they were eliminated by América de Cali in the quarter-finals.

Corinthians entered the 1996 Libertadores after winning their first Brazilian Cup final win in mid-1995. Coached by Eduardo Amorim and featuring players like Marcelinho Carioca and Edmundo, they finished as group winners over Universidad de Chile, Botafogo and Universidad Católica. In the round of 16, they eliminated Espol and reached the quarter-finals of the Libertadores for the first time in their history. Facing Grêmio, the holders of the 1995 Libertadores, the match felt like a final for Corinthians. In the first leg at Pacaembu Stadium, they were shocked with a 3–0 home defeat. Despite a 1–0 victory away, Corinthians were eliminated on aggregate. Two years later, the club participated in the first edition of the Copa Mercosur, but their campaign ended outside the top two spots in their group.

After winning their second Brazilian Championship under Vanderlei Luxemburgo, Corinthians reached the 1999 Libertadores. In February, Evaristo de Macedo was hired to lead the club in South America's premier competition. In the group stage, Corinthians faced Cerro Porteño, Olimpia, and their bitter rivals Palmeiras. With players like Carlos Gamarra, Vampeta, Freddy Rincón, Ricardinho, Marcelinho Carioca, Edílson and Fernando Baiano, Corinthians finished as group winners. One of the highlights of that campaign was the 8–2 victory against Cerro Porteño, with Fernando Baiano scoring five goals. After eliminating Jorge Wilstermann in the round of 16, Macedo resigned three days before the quarter-final matches against Palmeiras. Interim coach Oswaldo de Oliveira took charge for both legs at Morumbi. Despite more than 30 shots on target against Palmeiras, Corinthians lost 2–0 in the first leg. In the second leg, Corinthians won 2–0 but were eliminated 4–2 on penalties. That season, the club also participated in their second Copa Mercosur but were eliminated in the quarter-finals by San Lorenzo de Almagro.

Sport Club Corinthians Paulista fixtures in international competitions (1977–1999)
Season	Competition	Round	Opponent	Home	Away	Agg.	Ref.
1977	Libertadores Cup	GS	(Brazil) SC Internacional	1–1	0–1	3rd	
1977	Libertadores Cup	GS	(Ecuador) El Nacional	3–0	1–2	3rd	
1977	Libertadores Cup	GS	(Ecuador) CD Cuenca	4–0	1–2	3rd	
1991	Libertadores Cup	GS	(Brazil) Flamengo	0–2	1–1	2nd	
1991	Libertadores Cup	GS	(Uruguay) Bella Vista	4–1	1–1	2nd	
1991	Libertadores Cup	GS	(Uruguay) Nacional de Montevideo	0–0	1–1	2nd	
1991	Libertadores Cup	R16	(Argentina) Boca Juniors	1–1	1–3	2–4	
1994	CONMEBOL Cup	R16	(Brazil) Vitória	3–2	1–1	4–3	
1994	CONMEBOL Cup	QF	(Venezuela) Minervén	6–0	5–2	11–2	
1994	CONMEBOL Cup	SF	(Brazil) São Paulo FC	3–4	3–2	6–6 (4–5 p)	
1995	CONMEBOL Cup	R16	(Brazil) Ceará	2–2	1–1	3–3 (7–6 p)	
1995	CONMEBOL Cup	QF	(Colombia) América de Cali	2–1	1–3	3–4	
1996	Libertadores Cup	GS	(Brazil) Botafogo	3–0	1–1	1st	
1996	Libertadores Cup	GS	(Chile) Universidad Católica	3–1	3–2	1st	
1996	Libertadores Cup	GS	Universidad de Chile	3–1	0–1	1st	
1996	Libertadores Cup	R16	(Ecuador) Espoli	2–0	3–1	5–1	
1996	Libertadores Cup	QF	(Brazil) Grêmio	0–3	1–0	1–3	
1998	Mercosur Cup	GS	(Paraguay) Olimpia	1–2	2–2	3rd	
1998	Mercosur Cup	GS	(Argentina) Racing Avellaneda	1–2	0–1	3rd	
1998	Mercosur Cup	GS	(Uruguay) Peñarol	1–1	2–0	3rd	
1999	Libertadores Cup	GS	(Brazil) Palmeiras	2–1	0–1	1st	
1999	Libertadores Cup	GS	(Paraguay) Cerro Porteño	8–2	0–3	1st	
1999	Libertadores Cup	GS	(Paraguay) Olimpia	4–0	2–1	1st	
1999	Libertadores Cup	R16	(Bolivia) Jorge Wilstermann	5–2	1–1	6–3	
1999	Libertadores Cup	QF	(Brazil) Palmeiras	2–0	0–2	2–2 (2–4 p)	
1999	Mercosur Cup	GS	(Argentina) Independiente	1–2	0–2	2nd	
1999	Mercosur Cup	GS	(Argentina) Vélez Sarsfield	2–0	3–0	2nd	
1999	Mercosur Cup	GS	(Brazil) Grêmio	4–1	0–0	2nd	
1999	Mercosur Cup	QF	(Argentina) San Lorenzo	1–2	1–2	2–4	
Corinthians goals appear first in scores.; Wins are highlighted in green, draws in yellow, and losses in red.

=== World Champion Clubs and frustrations in South America (2000–2010) ===
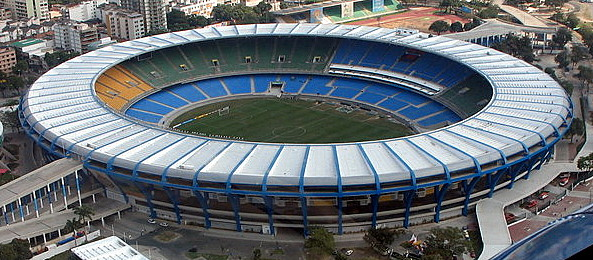
Maracanã Stadium (pictured) staged the 2000 FIFA Club World Championship Final won by Corinthians against Vasco.

One of eight teams participating in the inaugural FIFA Club World Cup in 2000, Corinthians were nominated by the Brazilian Football Confederation as the host country's representative in the new competition. The 1999 Brazilian Championship holders had just claimed their third national league title, with key players such as Dida, Freddy Rincón, Vampeta, Ricardinho, Marcelinho Carioca, Edílson and Luizão. Corinthians began their campaign with a 2–0 victory over African champions Raja by 2–0. In the second round, they secured a 2–2 draw with Real Madrid, with standout performances from Edílson, who scored twice, and goalkeeper Dida, who saved a late penalty from Nicolas Anelka A hard-fought 2–0 victory over Al-Nassr confirmed Corinthians as group winners and sealed their spot in the final in Rio de Janeiro. The opponent was Vasco da Gama, winner of the other group.

In front of more than 73,000 supporters, most of whom were in favor of the Carioca team, at Maracanã Stadium, the two sides played a match marked by few offensive moves. With the score tied 0–0 after regulation and extra time, the game was decided by a penalty shootout. Rincón, Fernando Baiano, Luizão, and Edu converted the first four penalties for Corinthians, while Dida saved a penalty from Gilberto. Although Marcelinho Carioca missed his penalty and was denied by Vasco goalkeeper Helton, Edmundo also missed for Vasco. Corinthians won 4–3 and were crowned the first-ever FIFA Club World Cup champions. The title also marked their first international trophy in the club's history.

Four weeks later, Corinthians began their 2000 Copa Libertadores journey with high expectations, hoping to finally claim South America's most prestigious club trophy, a long-time obsession for their supporters, players, and staff alike. However, the club struggled to top their group, which included América, Olimpia and LDU Quito. They eliminated Racing Avellaneda in the round of 16 and Atlético Mineiro in the quarter-finals to reach their first Copa Libertadores semi-final. Their opponent was rival Palmeiras, who had been a tormentor in previous Libertadores edition. In the first leg, Corinthians triumphed 4–3 with a late goal from Vampeta. However, after a 3–2 loss in the second leg, they were eliminated by penalties, with Corinthians idol Marcelinho Carioca missing the decisive spot-kick.

Following this painful exit from the Libertadores, Corinthians also had a disappointing campaign in the Copa Mercosur that season. After starting the competition under coach Oswaldo Alvarez and finishing with Candinho at the helm, Corinthians failed to win any of their six matches, finishing last in their group. Under coach Vanderlei Luxemburgo, Corinthians reached the semi-finals of the Copa Mercosur the following year, where they were eliminated by San Lorenzo de Almagro after a 2–1 win at home and a heavy 4–1 defeat away.

In 2002, Corinthians won their second Brazilian Cup and qualified for the 2003 Copa Libertadores. In a group with Cruz Azul, Fénix and The Strongest, the Corinthians squad, coached by Geninho, finished the group stage with the best record, winning five of their six matches. In the round of 16, they faced River Plate. After taking the lead at Monumental de Nuñez, Corinthians were provoked by River's tactics, which led to a red card and two late goals from the hosts. The return leg at Morumbi followed a similar script. Corinthians scored first but again lost their composure, suffering a 2–1 defeat and being eliminated. Corinthians also participated in the Copa Sudamericana that year, a competition that replaced the Copa Mercosur, but were eliminated in the preliminary phase. They returned to the tournament two years later, but were eliminated by Pumas UNAM in the quarter-finals.

Corinthians secured their fourth Brazilian league title in 2005, earning a spot i the 2006 Copa Libertadores. With a squad assembled by Media Sports Investment, which included players like Carlos Tevez, Javier Mascherano and Carlos Alberto, the team, initially coached by Daniel Passarella, later hired Antonio Lopes after Passarella's departure. Corinthians finished first in their group, which included Tigres UANL, Universidad Católica and Deportivo Cali. In the round of 16, they faced River Plate, the club that had eliminated them three years earlier. A 3–2 loss away in the first leg was marred by two controversial decisions by referee Carlos Amarilla, who disallowed a legitimate goal by Tévez and sent off Mascherano for a non-existent foul. In the return leg at Pacaembu, Corinthians took the lead but lost 3–1, suffering three goals in 25 minutes. The match ended in chaos, with irate Corinthians fans invading the pitch, prompting the police to intervene and the game to be called off before the 90th minute. Months later, under coach Emerson Leão, the club was eliminated in the round of 16 of the Copa Sudamericana that season by Lanús.

Corinthians’ disastrous 2007 season, which saw them relegated to the Brazilian second division the following year, was preceded by a poor campaign in the Copa Sudamericana.

After earning promotion back to the top flight in 2009, Corinthians, coached by Mano Menezes and featuring striker Ronaldo, won their third Brazilian Cup and qualified for the 2010 Copa Libertadores. Also featuring Roberto Carlos in their ranks, the club aimed to win South America's premier competition to celebrate their centenary. Corinthians progressed through the group stage, defeating Racing Montevideo, Independiente Medellín and Cerro Porteño, finishing as group winners with five wins and one draw in six matches, thus guaranteeing the best campaign among the 16 classified for the knockout stage. In the round of 16, they faced Flamengo. Despite a 1–0 loss at Maracanã, Corinthians’ 2–1 win at home was not enough to prevent elimination on the away goals rule. After Menezes was appointed as the Brazil national football team manager, Corinthians hired Tite as their new coach. Sitting third in the Brazilian league, the club qualified for the 2011 Copa Libertadores preliminary stage. Paired with Tolima, Corinthians drew 0–0 in the first leg at home but were eliminated after a 2–0 loss in Ibagué.

Sport Club Corinthians Paulista fixtures in international competitions (2000–2011)
Season	Competition	Round	Opponent	Home	Away	Agg.	Ref.
2000	FIFA Club World Cup	GS	(Morocco) Raja CA	—N/a	—N/a	2–0	
2000	FIFA Club World Cup	GS	(Spain) Real Madrid	—N/a	—N/a	2–2	
2000	FIFA Club World Cup	GS	(Saudi Arabia) Al Nassr FC	—N/a	—N/a	2–0	
2000	FIFA Club World Cup	F	(Brazil) Vasco da Gama	—N/a	—N/a	0–0 (4–3 p)	
2000	Libertadores Cup	GS	(Mexico) América	2–1	0–2	1st	
2000	Libertadores Cup	GS	(Ecuador) LDU Quito	6–0	2–0	1st	
2000	Libertadores Cup	GS	(Paraguay) Olimpia	5–4	2–2	1st	
2000	Libertadores Cup	R16	(Argentina) Racing Avellaneda	3–2	2–3	5–5 (4–3 p)	
2000	Libertadores Cup	QF	(Brazil) Atlético Mineiro	2–1	1–1	3–2	
2000	Libertadores Cup	SF	(Brazil) Palmeiras	2–3	4–3	6–6 (4–5 p)	
2000	Mercosur Cup	GS	(Uruguay) Nacional Montevideo	1–2	1–1	4th	
2000	Mercosur Cup	GS	(Argentina) Boca Juniors	2–2	0–3	4th	
2000	Mercosur Cup	GS	(Paraguay) Olimpia	1–2	2–3	4th	
2001	Mercosur Cup	GS	(Chile) Colo-Colo	0–0	2–0	2nd	
2001	Mercosur Cup	GS	(Argentina) Independiente	2–1	0–1	2nd	
2001	Mercosur Cup	GS	(Brazil) Cruzeiro	2–4	2–0	2nd	
2001	Mercosur Cup	QF	(Chile) Universidad Católica	2–0	1–2	3–2	
2001	Mercosur Cup	SF	(Argentina) San Lorenzo	2–1	1–4	3–5	
2003	Libertadores Cup	GS	(Mexico) Cruz Azul	1–0	0–3	1st	
2003	Libertadores Cup	GS	(Uruguay) Fénix	6–1	2–1	1st	
2003	Libertadores Cup	GS	(Bolivia) The Strongest	4–1	2–0	1st	
2003	Libertadores Cup	R16	(Argentina) River Plate	1–2	1–2	2–4	
2003	Sudamericana Cup	PR	(Brazil) Atlético Mineiro	0–2	—N/a	3rd	
2003	Sudamericana Cup	PR	(Brazil) Fluminense	—N/a	0–2	3rd	
2005	Sudamericana Cup	PR	(Brazil) Goiás	1–1	2–0	3–1	
2005	Sudamericana Cup	R16	(Argentina) River Plate	0–0	1–1	1–1	
2005	Sudamericana Cup	QF	(Mexico) Pumas UNAM	2–1	0–3	2–4	
2006	Libertadores Cup	GS	(Colombia) Deportivo Cali	3–0	1–0	1st	
2006	Libertadores Cup	GS	(Chile) Universidad Católica	2–2	3–2	1st	
2006	Libertadores Cup	GS	(Mexico) Tigres UANL	1–0	0–2	1st	
2006	Libertadores Cup	R16	(Argentina) River Plate	2–3	1–3	3–6	
2006	Sudamericana Cup	PR	(Brazil) Vasco da Gama	3–1	1–0	4–1	
2006	Sudamericana Cup	R16	(Argentina) Lanús	0–0	2–4	2–4	
2007	Sudamericana Cup	PR	(Brazil) Botafogo	1–2	1–3	2–5	
2010	Libertadores Cup	GS	(Uruguay) Racing Montevideo	2–1	2–0	1st	
2010	Libertadores Cup	GS	(Colombia) Independiente Medellín	1–0	1–1	1st	
2010	Libertadores Cup	GS	(Paraguay) Cerro Porteño	2–1	1–0	1st	
2010	Libertadores Cup	R16	(Brazil) Flamengo	2–1	0–1	2–2	
2011	Libertadores Cup	PR	(Colombia) Tolima	0–0	0–2	0–2	
Corinthians goals appear first in scores.; Wins are highlighted in green, draws in yellow, and losses in red.

=== The first Libertadores and world champion again (2012–2016) ===
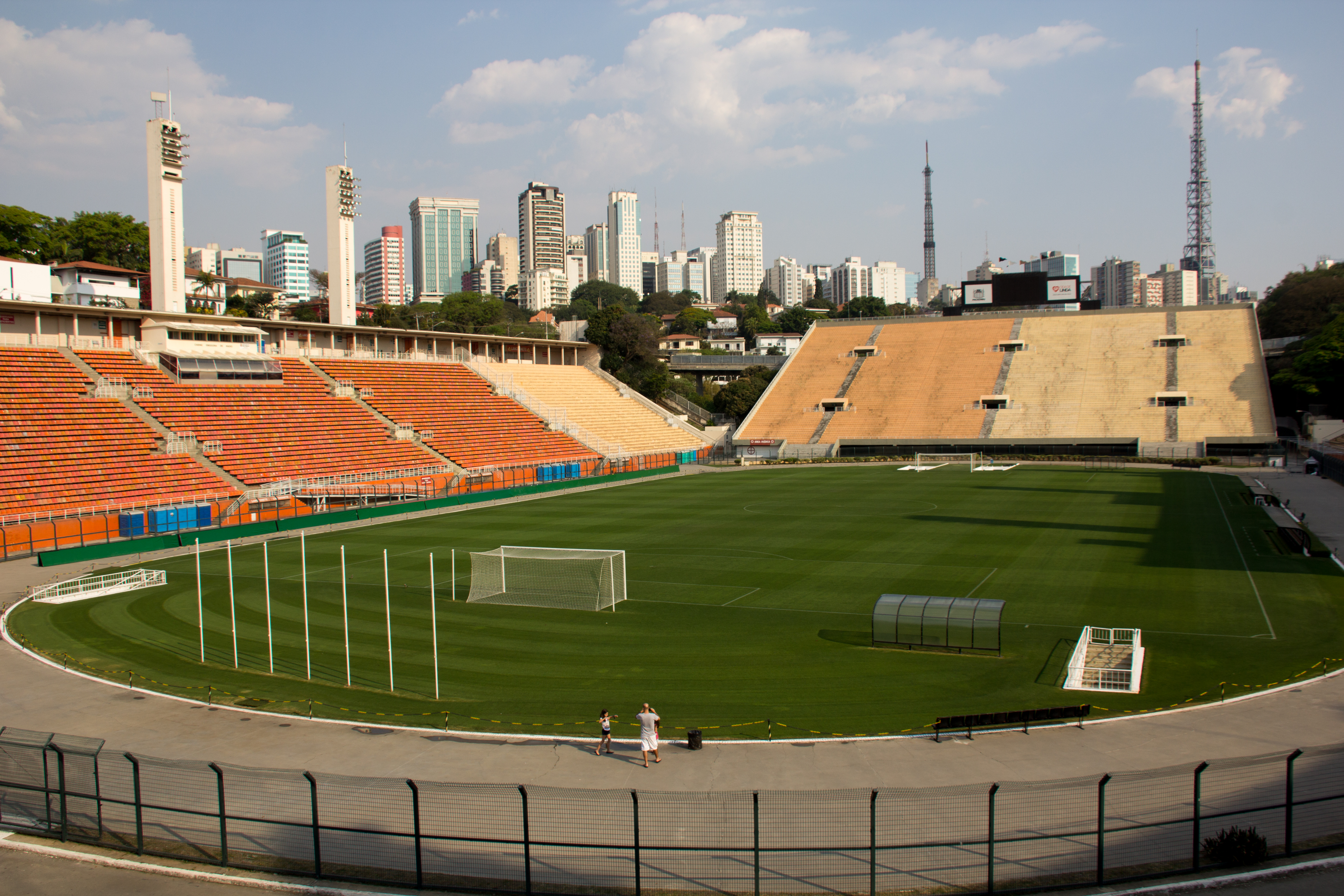
The 2012 Copa Libertadores 2nd leg final, between Corinthians and Boca Juniors, was held in Pacaembu Stadium (pictured).

Despite suffering the most embarrassing Libertadores defeat in their history, Corinthians retained Tite as their coach. They clinched their fifth Brazilian national championship on a day when Socrates, one of their former stars, died, and secured a spot in the 2012 Copa Libertadores group stage. Their campaign began in a group that included Deportivo Táchira, Nacional Asunción, and Cruz Azul. They qualified for the knockout phase as group winners, achieving four wins and two draws in six matches. Having the second-best campaign among the 16 qualified teams, Corinthians faced Emelec, who had the second-worst record among the runners-up, in the round of 16. With Cássio making his debut in the starting lineup, a goalless first leg in Guayaquil postponed the decision to the Pacaembu Stadium, where Fábio Santos, Paulinho and Alex ensured a 3–0 victory to advance Corinthians to the next round. The quarter-final matchup against Vasco da Gama was set as part of the fixed bracket produced by the round of 16 pairings. In Rio de Janeiro, a goalless draw in the first leg left the Paulistas needing to win to qualify; any draw with goals would favor the Cariocas under the away goals rule. At Pacaembu, the game featured more crunching tackles than clear-cut chances. Vasco had two good opportunities in the second half when Diego Souza broke clear of the Corinthians defense but had his effort saved by Cássio; then Nilton headed against the post. Instead, Paulinho rose to head in a corner in the 87th minute, giving Corinthians a 1–0 victory and advancing them to the semi-finals for the first time since 2000.

Corinthians faced the holders, Santos, and won the first leg 1–0 at Vila Belmiro Stadium, where Emerson scored a brilliant goal in a match marred by a 20-minute delay due to a power outage in the 82nd minute. At home, Corinthians found themselves at a disadvantage when Neymar opened the scoring for Santos in the 35th minute, but they equalized just two minutes into the second half when Alex swung over a free kick that fell to Danilo, who sidefooted it into the goal. This 1–1 draw edged out compatriots Santos on aggregate and put Corinthians in the Libertadores finals for the first time in their history. The other finalists were six-time winners Boca Juniors, who had eliminated Universidad de Chile in the other semi-final. At La Bombonera in Buenos Aires, Facundo Roncaglia put Boca ahead in the 72nd minute, but substitute Romarinho gathered a pass and lobbed a perfectly weighted shot over fallen Boca goalkeeper Agustín Orión six minutes from time, resulting in a 1–1 away draw in the first leg of the Copa Libertadores finals. At a packed Pacaembu Stadium, Corinthians took the lead in the 54th minute when Emerson capitalized on playmaker Danilo's back-heel after Boca's defense failed to clear the ball from a free kick. In the 72nd minute, Boca came close with a header that was saved by Cássio, but just seconds later, Rolando Schiavi lost the ball, allowing Emerson to sprint 45 yards and slot it home. Corinthians secured a 2–0 win in the second leg (3–1 on aggregate), claiming their first Copa Libertadores title. The result also meant Corinthians went through the competition unbeaten, finishing with eight wins and six draws, and became the sixth club to win the Libertadores after an uninterrupted sequence of success, following Peñarol (7-streak games in 1960), Santos (4-streak games in 1963), Independiente (7-streak games in 1964), Estudiantes (4-streak games both in 1969 and 1970) and Boca Juniors (6-streak games in 1978). The club conceded only four goals in 14 games.

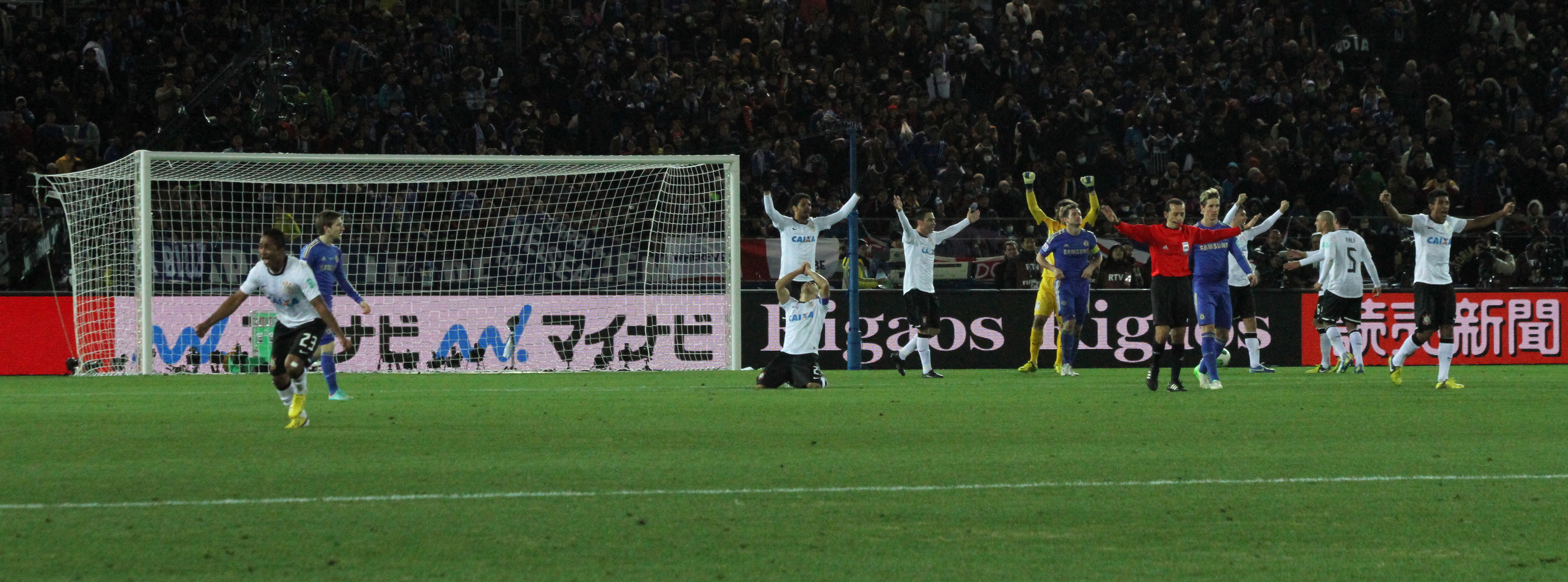
Corinthians players celebrate the 2012 FIFA Club World Cup winning against Chelsea at Yokohama International Stadium.

Twelve years after winning the inaugural event in Brazil, Corinthians traveled to Japan for the 2012 FIFA Club World Cup. São Paulo's main airport was invaded by 15,000 supporters, who gave a loud send-off to the Corinthians squad before their departure. A similar number of fans made the trip to Japan to support their team. Corinthians entered as semi-finalists and played against Al-Ahly, who had eliminated Sanfrecce Hiroshima in the quarter-finals. At Toyota Stadium, the Brazilian club secured their spot in the Club World Cup final after defeating the African champions 1–0, with Douglas sending a superb cross into the box that Paolo Guerrero headed into the net of Al-Ahly goalkeeper Sherif Ekramy in the 29th minute. The other finalist was Chelsea, who beat Monterrey in the other semi-final. About 30,000 Corinthians fans cheered and supported the team in the final at Yokohama International Stadium, which hosted 68,275 spectators. In the first 45 minutes, the Corinthians-Chelsea match featured chances at both ends. However, Chelsea looked more dangerous when Gary Cahill and Victor Moses missed good opportunities, both denied by brilliant saves from goalkeeper Cassio. In the 69th minute, Corinthians took the lead when Paulinho collected a pass and entered the penalty area. The ball fell to Danilo, who cut inside and saw his shot loop off Cahill before Guerrero headed in the loose ball from five yards off the underside of the bar, despite two Chelsea players on the line. Four minutes from time, Fernando Torres had a glorious chance to level when he was one-on-one with Cássio but shot right at the keeper. The 1–0 win crowned Corinthians FIFA World Club Champions for the second time in their history and made them one of only two teams (at that time), along with FC Barcelona, to have won the title twice. Cássio’s outstanding performance earned him the tournament MVP award.

No longer carrying the burden of winning the Libertadores, Corinthians began their next international season with a guaranteed spot as holders in the group stage of the 22013 South American tournament. The 1–1 draw away in their opening game against San José in Oruro was overshadowed by the death of Kevin Beltrán Spada, a victim of a flare shot at the Jesús Bermúdez Stadium. Since the incident was provoked by Corinthians fans, the Brazilian club was punished by CONMEBOL and forced to play behind closed doors against Millonarios at Pacaembu. The defending champions advanced to the round of 16 as group winners. Facing Boca Juniors away in the first leg, Corinthians were defeated 1–0. At Pacaembu, Román Riquelme opened the scoring in the 25th minute, and Paulinho equalized early in the second half. Corinthians needed to score two more times to advance but failed to do so, and the 1–1 draw at home eliminated the holders. However, Carlos Amarilla's refereeing was loudly criticized by the Brazilian side, who complained especially about two disallowed goals and two alleged penalties ignored by the Paraguayan referee. According to recordings of phone conversations between Argentine officials revealed two years after the match by Argentina’s America TV channel, Amarilla had been selected to help Boca. In one of the recordings, Argentine football godfather Julio Grondona, then president of the Argentine Football Association, hinted that “the guy who gave Boca the best support it had last year was [referee Carlos] Amarilla". Despite the frustration of being eliminated from the Libertadores, Corinthians ended their continental season by contesting the 2013 Recopa Sudamericana against São Paulo, the holders of the 2012 Copa Sudamericana, in July. Corinthians won the first leg 2–1 away and the second leg 2–0 at home, becoming champions of this competition for the first time.

After a season without qualifying for South American competitions, Corinthians earned a spot in the qualifying round of the 2015 Copa Libertadores. They won 4–0 against Once Caldas in the first international club competition match at Arena Corinthians and drew 0–0 away, reaching the group stage, where they faced São Paulo, Danubio and defending champions San Lorenzo de Almagro. A strong campaign in this stage guaranteed first place for Corinthians, but they were subsequently knocked out in the round of 16 after a surprising 3–0 defeat on aggregate against Guaraní. Around six months later, Corinthians were crowned Brazilian champions for the sixth time, securing their place in the Libertadores in the following season. The club won their group, which included Cerro Porteño, Independiente Santa Fe and Cobresal. However, in the round of 16, they were knocked out on the away goals rule after two draws against Nacional de Montevideo. Soon after this matchup, Tite left Corinthians to coach the Brazil national football team.

Sport Club Corinthians Paulista fixtures in international competitions (2012–2016)
Season	Competition	Round	Opponent	Home	Away	Agg.	Ref.
2012	Libertadores Cup	GS	(Venezuela) Deportivo Táchira	6–0	1–1	1st	
2012	Libertadores Cup	GS	(Paraguay) Nacional Asunción	2–0	3–1	1st	
2012	Libertadores Cup	GS	(Mexico) Cruz Azul	1–0	0–0	1st	
2012	Libertadores Cup	R16	(Ecuador) Emelec	3–0	0–0	3–0	
2012	Libertadores Cup	QF	(Brazil) Vasco da Gama	1–0	0–0	1–0	
2012	Libertadores Cup	SF	(Brazil) Santos FC	1–1	1–0	2–1	
2012	Libertadores Cup	F	(Argentina) Boca Juniors	2–0	1–1	3–1	
2012	FIFA Club World Cup	SF	(Egypt) Al-Ahly	—N/a	—N/a	1–0	
2012	FIFA Club World Cup	F	(England) Chelsea	—N/a	—N/a	1–0	
2013	Libertadores Cup	GS	(Bolivia) San José	3–0	1–1	1st	
2013	Libertadores Cup	GS	(Colombia) Millonarios	2–0	1–0	1st	
2013	Libertadores Cup	GS	(Mexico) Tijuana	3–0	0–1	1st	
2013	Libertadores Cup	R16	(Argentina) Boca Juniors	1–1	0–1	1–2	
2013	Recopa Sudamericana	F	(Brazil) São Paulo FC	2–0	2–1	4–1	
2015	Libertadores Cup	PR	(Colombia) Once Caldas	4–0	1–1	5–1	
2015	Libertadores Cup	GS	(Brazil) São Paulo FC	2–0	0–2	1st	
2015	Libertadores Cup	GS	(Argentina) San Lorenzo	0–0	1–0	1st	
2015	Libertadores Cup	GS	(Uruguay) Danubio	4–0	2–1	1st	
2015	Libertadores Cup	R16	(Paraguay) Guaraní	0–2	0–1	0–3	
2016	Libertadores Cup	GS	(Chile) Cobresal	6–0	1–0	1st	
2016	Libertadores Cup	GS	(Colombia) Independiente Santa Fe	1–0	1–1	1st	
2016	Libertadores Cup	GS	(Paraguay) Cerro Porteño	2–0	2–3	1st	
2016	Libertadores Cup	R16	(Uruguay) Nacional Montevideo	2–2	0–0	2–2	
Corinthians goals appear first in scores.; Wins are highlighted in green, draws in yellow, and losses in red.

=== Recent years (2017–present) ===
After the departure of their most successful coach, Corinthians initially hired outside candidates until giving a chance to Tite's former assistant, Fabio Carille. His first international competition was the 2017 Copa Sudamericana, in which Corinthians were eliminated in the round of 16 after two draws on aggregate against Racing Avellaneda. The club secured a place in the 2018 Copa Libertadores group stage by winning their seventh Brazilian championship title. Despite finishing first in the group stage, Corinthians only managed to defeat Deportivo Lara at home, losing two matches against Independiente and Millonarios—this last one under new coach Osmar Loss, who took over after Carille's departure. Corinthians then faced Colo-Colo in the round of 16; after a 1–0 loss in Santiago, a 3–1 victory at home was insufficient to avoid elimination under the away goals rule.

With Carille back in charge the following season, Corinthians reached the semi-finals of the 2019 Copa Sudamericana, where they were defeated by Independiente del Valle. They qualified for the preliminary round of the 2020 Copa Libertadores but were eliminated by Guaraní after a 2–2 aggregate score, with the Paraguayan side advancing on the away goals rule. Their participation in the 2021 Copa Sudamericana was short-lived, as Corinthians finished outside the top place in their group, which included a 4–0 away defeat against Peñarol—the club's heaviest loss in South America at that time.

Qualified for the Copa Libertadores in the following season, Corinthians hired Portuguese coach Vítor Pereira to replace Sylvinho, who was fired at the beginning of February due to poor results. Although they reached their first quarter-finals spot since 2012 after a heroic triumph on penalties against Boca Juniors at La Bombonera, Corinthians faced many difficulties throughout the competition, particularly with injured starting players and a lack of a clear game planplan. They were beaten by Flamengo 0–3 on aggregate, winning only two of ten matches and scoring five goals during their campaign.

Returning to the Libertadores in 2023, the club from Parque São Jorge had a disappointing campaign in the group stage and failed to advance to the knockout rounds. Fernando Lázaro started as coach but was fired after the second match and replaced by Vanderlei Luxemburgo. Despite their early elimination from the Libertadores, they secured a spot in the Copa Sudamericana playoffs, where they reached the semifinals but were eliminated by Fortaleza with a 1–3 aggregate score – their final match being coached by Mano Menezes. In the following season, Corinthians returned to the Copa Sudamericana, but once again, the team – coached by António Oliveira during the group stage and by Ramon Diaz in the knockout rounds – was stopped in the semifinals, eliminated by Racing Avellaneda with a 3–4 aggregate score over two legs. In 2025, Corinthians was eliminated both in the Libertadores preliminary phase and the Copa Sudamericana group stage. Díaz managed the team in seven of these matches, Orlando Ribeiro in one, and Dorival Junior in two.

In the 2026 season, Corinthians took part in the Copa Libertadores maneged by Fernando Diniz. The team was knocked out by Estudiantes in the quarter-finals, after a 1–1 draw in La Plata and a 0–1 defeat at Neo Química Arena, with a missed penalty by Corinthians player Memphis Depay in the final moments of the second leg.

Sport Club Corinthians Paulista fixtures in international competitions (2017–present)
Season	Competition	Round	Opponent	Home	Away	Agg.	Ref.
2017	Sudamericana Cup	R1	Universidad de Chile	2–0	2–1	4–1	
2017	Sudamericana Cup	R2	(Colombia) Patriotas Boyacá	2–0	1–1	3–1	
2017	Sudamericana Cup	R16	(Argentina) Racing Avellaneda	1–1	0–0	1–1	
2018	Libertadores Cup	GS	(Colombia) Millonarios	0–1	0–0	1st	
2018	Libertadores Cup	GS	(Venezuela) Deportivo Lara	2–0	7–2	1st	
2018	Libertadores Cup	GS	(Argentina) Independiente	1–2	1–0	1st	
2018	Libertadores Cup	R16	(Chile) Colo-Colo	2–1	0–1	2–2	
2019	Sudamericana Cup	R1	(Argentina) Racing Avellaneda	1–1	1–1	2–2 (5–4 p)	
2019	Sudamericana Cup	R2	(Venezuela) Deportivo Lara	2–0	2–0	4–0	
2019	Sudamericana Cup	R16	(Uruguay) Montevideo Wanderers	2–0	2–1	4–1	
2019	Sudamericana Cup	QF	(Brazil) Fluminense	0–0	1–1	1–1	
2019	Sudamericana Cup	SF	(Ecuador) Independiente del Valle	0–2	2–2	2–4	
2020	Libertadores Cup	PR	(Paraguay) Guaraní	2–1	0–1	2–2	
2021	Sudamericana Cup	GS	(Paraguay) River Plate Asunción	4–0	0–0	2nd	
2021	Sudamericana Cup	GS	(Uruguay) Peñarol	0–2	0–4	2nd	
2021	Sudamericana Cup	GS	(Peru) Sport Huancayo	5–0	3–0	2nd	
2022	Libertadores Cup	GS	(Bolivia) Always Ready	1–1	0–2	2nd	
2022	Libertadores Cup	GS	(Colombia) Deportivo Cali	1–0	0–0	2nd	
2022	Libertadores Cup	GS	(Argentina) Boca Juniors	2–0	1–1	2nd	
2022	Libertadores Cup	R16	(Argentina) Boca Juniors	0–0	0–0	0–0 (6–5 p)	
2022	Libertadores Cup	QF	(Brazil) Flamengo	0–2	0–1	0–3	
2023	Libertadores Cup	FGr	(Uruguay) Liverpool	3–0	3–0	3º	
2023	Libertadores Cup	FGr	(Argentina) Argentinos Juniors	0–1	0–0	3º	
2023	Libertadores Cup	FGr	(Ecuador) Independiente del Valle	1–2	0–3	3º	
2023	Sudamericana Cup	KS	(Peru) Universitario	1–0	2–1	3–1	
2023	Sudamericana Cup	R16	(Argentina) Newell's Old Boys	2–1	0–0	2–1	
2023	Sudamericana Cup	QF	(Argentina) Estudiantes	1–0	0–1	1–1 (3–2 p)	
2023	Sudamericana Cup	SF	(Brazil) Fortaleza	1–1	0–2	1–3	
2024	Sudamericana Cup	GS	(Uruguay) Racing Montevideo	3–0	1–1	1st	
2024	Sudamericana Cup	GS	(Argentina) Argentinos Juniors	4–0	0–1	1st	
2024	Sudamericana Cup	GS	(Paraguay) Nacional Asunción	4–0	2–0	1st	
2024	Sudamericana Cup	R16	(Brazil) Red Bull Bragantino	1–2	2–1	3–3 (5–4 p)	
2024	Sudamericana Cup	QF	(Brazil) Fortaleza	3–0	2–0	5–0	
2024	Sudamericana Cup	SF	(Argentina) Racing Avellaneda	2–2	1–2	3–4	
2025	Copa Libertadores	PR	(Venezuela) Universidad Central	3–2	1–1	4–3	
2025	Copa Libertadores	PR	(Ecuador) Barcelona	2–0	0–3	2–3	
2025	Copa Sul-Americana	FGr	(Argentina) Huracán	1–2	0–1	3º	
2025	Copa Sul-Americana	FGr	(Uruguay) Racing Montevideo	1–0	1–0	3º	
2025	Copa Sul-Americana	FGr	(Colombia) América de Cali	1–1	1–1	3º	
2026	Libertadores Cup	GS	(Argentina) Platense	0–2	2–0	1st	
2026	Libertadores Cup	GS	(Colombia) Independiente Santa Fe	2–0	1–1	1st	
2026	Libertadores Cup	GS	(Uruguay) Peñarol	2–0	1–1	1st	
2026	Libertadores Cup	R16	(Argentina) Rosario Central	1–0	0–0	1–0	
2026	Libertadores Cup	QF	(Argentina) Estudiantes de La Plata	0–1	1–1	1–2	
Corinthians goals appear first in scores.; Wins are highlighted in green, draws in yellow, and losses in red.

== Records ==
As of 25 September 2026

Key

- P = Matches played
- W = Matches won
- D = Matches drawn
- L = Matches lost
- GF = Goals for
- GA = Goals against
- GD = Goal difference
- F = Finals
- FW = Finals won
- FL = Finals lost
- PR = Preliminary round
- GS = Group stage
- KS = Knockout round play-offs Sudamericana
- R16 = Round of 16
- QF = Quarter-finals
- SF = Semi-finals
- W = Winners
- RU = Runners-up

=== Team, coaches and players ===
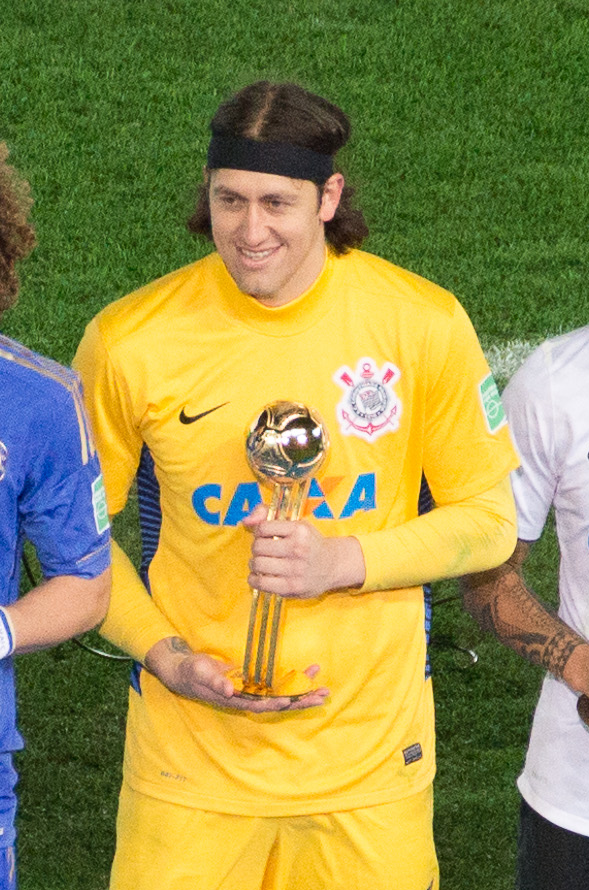
Goalkeeper Cássio holds the club record for most appearances in international club competitions (90).

- First match: 1–1 vs Internacional, 1977 Copa Libertadores group stage, at Morumbi Stadium (3 April 1977).
- First goal: Zé Maria, against Internacional, 1977 Copa Libertadores group stage, at Morumbi Stadium (3 April 1977).
- Biggest home win: 8–2 vs Cerro Porteño, 1999 Copa Libertadores group stage, at Pacaembu Stadium (10 March 1999).
- Biggest away win: 2–7 vs Deportivo Lara, 2018 Copa Libertadores group stage, at Metropolitano de Lara (17 May 2018).
- Biggest home loss: 0–4 vs Cruzeiro, 2001 Copa Mercorsur group stage, at Pacaembu Stadium (17 October 2001).
- Biggest away loss: 0–4 vs Peñarol, 2021 Copa Sudamericana group stage, at (13 May 2021).
- Record home attendance: 94,239 fans vs Internacional, in the 1977 Libertadores group stage, at Morumbi Stadium (3 April 1977).
- Player with most total appearances: Cássio, 90.
- Player with most goals scored: Luizão, 22.
- Coach with most matches: Tite, 48.
- Coach with most titles: Tite, 3.

=== By season ===
Corinthians record in international club football by season
Season	Competition	Pld	W	D	L	GF	GA	GD	Round
1977	Copa Libertadores	6	2	1	3	10	6	+4	GS
1991	Copa Libertadores	8	1	5	2	9	10	−1	R16
1994	Copa Conmebol	6	4	1	1	21	11	+10	SF
1995	Copa Conmebol	4	1	2	1	6	7	-1	QF
1996	Copa Libertadores	10	7	1	2	19	10	+9	QF
1998	Copa Mercosur	6	1	2	3	7	8	−1	GS
1999	Copa Libertadores	10	6	1	3	24	13	+11	QF
1999	Copa Mercosur	8	3	1	4	12	9	+3	QF
2000	FIFA Club World Cup	4	2	2	0	6	2	+4	W
2000	Copa Libertadores	12	7	2	3	31	22	+9	SF
2000	Copa Mercosur	6	0	2	4	7	13	−6	GS
2001	Copa Mercosur	10	5	1	4	14	13	+1	SF
2003	Copa Libertadores	8	5	0	3	17	10	+7	R16
2003	Copa Sudamericana	2	0	0	2	0	4	−4	PR
2005	Copa Sudamericana	6	2	3	1	6	6	0	QF
2006	Copa Libertadores	8	4	1	3	13	12	+1	R16
2006	Copa Sudamericana	4	2	1	1	6	5	+1	R16
2007	Copa Sudamericana	2	0	0	2	2	5	−3	PR
2010	Copa Libertadores	8	6	1	1	11	5	+6	R16
2011	Copa Libertadores	2	0	1	1	0	2	−2	PR
2012	Copa Libertadores	14	8	6	0	22	4	+18	W
2012	FIFA Club World Cup	2	2	0	0	2	0	+2	W
2013	Copa Libertadores	8	4	2	2	11	4	+7	R16
2013	Recopa Sudamericana	2	2	0	0	4	1	+3	W
2015	Copa Libertadores	10	5	2	3	14	7	+7	R16
2016	Copa Libertadores	8	4	3	1	15	6	+9	R16
2017	Copa Sudamericana	6	3	3	0	8	3	+5	R16
2018	Copa Libertadores	8	4	1	3	13	7	+6	R16
2019	Copa Sudamericana	10	4	5	1	13	8	+5	SF
2020	Copa Libertadores	2	1	0	1	2	2	0	PR
2021	Copa Sudamericana	6	3	1	2	12	6	+6	GS
2022	Copa Libertadores	10	2	5	3	5	10	-5	QF
2023	Copa Libertadores	6	2	1	3	7	6	+1	GS
2023	Copa Sudamericana	8	4	2	2	7	6	+1	SF
2024	Copa Sudamericana	12	7	2	3	25	9	+16	SF
2025	Copa Libertadores	4	2	1	1	6	6	0	PR
2025	Copa Sudamericana	6	2	2	2	5	5	0	GS
2026	Copa Libertadores	10	4	4	2	10	6	+4	QF
Total		262	121	68	73	402	269	+133	

=== By competition ===
Corinthians record in international club football by competition
Competition	Entries	Pld	W	D	L	GF	GA	GD	F	FW	FL
FIFA Club World Cup	2	6	4	2	0	8	2	+6	2	2	0
Copa Libertadores	19	152	74	38	40	239	147	+92	1	1	0
Copa Sudamericana	10	62	27	19	16	84	57	+27		0	0
Recopa Sudamericana	1	2	2	0	0	4	1	+3	1	1	0
Copa Mercosur	4	30	9	6	15	40	43	-3	0	0	0
Copa Conmebol	2	10	5	3	2	27	18	+9	0	0	0
Total	38	262	121	68	73	402	269	+133	4	4	0

=== Finals ===
Matches won after regular time (90 minutes of play), extra-time (aet) or a penalty shootout (p) are highlighted in green, while losses are highlighted in red.

14 January 2000 FIFA Club World Cup	Corinthians (Brazil)	0–0 (a.e.t.) (4–3 p)	(Brazil) CR Vasco da Gama	Rio de Janeiro, Brasil
20:00 BRST (UTC-2)		Report		Stadium: Maracanã Stadium; Attendance: 73,000; Referee: Dick Jol (Netherlands)
	Penalties
	Rincón (penalty scored); Fernando Baiano (penalty scored); Luizão (penalty scored); Edu (penalty scored); Marcelinho (penalty missed)		(penalty scored) Romário; (penalty scored) Alex Oliveira; (penalty missed) Gilberto; (penalty scored) Viola; (penalty missed) Edmundo

27 June 2012 Copa Libertadores (1st leg)	CA Boca Juniors (Argentina)	1–1	(Brazil) Corinthians	Buenos Aires, Argentina
21:50 (UTC-3)	Roncaglia 72'	Report	Romarinho 84'	Stadium: La Bombonera Stadium; Referee: Enrique Osses (Chile)

4 July 2012 Copa Libertadores (2nd leg)	Corinthians (Brazil)	2–0 (3-1 agg.)	(Argentina) CA Boca Juniors	São Paulo, Brasil
21:50 (UTC-3)	Emerson 53', 72'	Report		Stadium: Pacaembu Stadium; Attendance: 37,959; Referee: Wilmar Roldán (Colombia)

16 December 2012 FIFA Club World Cup	Corinthians (Brazil)	1–0 (3 p)	(England) Chelsea FC	Yokohama, Japão
19:30 JST (UTC+09:00)	Guerrero 69'	Report		Stadium: International Stadium Yokohama; Attendance: 68,275; Referee: Cüneyt ÇakırTurkey)

3 July 2013 Recopa Sudamericana (1st leg)	São Paulo FC (Brazil)	1–2	(Brazil) Corinthians	São Paulo, Brasil
21:50 (UTC-3)	Aloísio 46'	Report	Guerrero 28'; Renato Augusto 75'	Stadium: Morumbi Stadium; Attendance: 31,691; Referee: Ricardo Marques Ribeiro (Brazil)

17 July 2013 Recopa Sudamericana (2nd leg)	Corinthians (Brazil)	2–0 (4-1 agg.)	(Brazil) São Paulo FC	São Paulo, Brasil
21:50 (UTC-3)	Romarinho 35'; Danilo 68'	Report		Stadium: Pacaembu Stadium; Attendance: 36,294; Referee: Paulo Cesar de Oliveira (Brazil)

== Honours ==
Corinthians honours in international club competitions
Competition	Titles	Years
FIFA Club World Cup	2	2000, 2012
Copa Libertadores	1	2012
Recopa Sudamericana	1	2013

== See also ==
- Football in Brazil

== Bibliography ==
- Pontes, Ricardo. "1976 Brazilian Championship". Rec.Sport.Soccer Statistics Foundation (RSSSF).
- Beuker, John; Ciullini, Pablo. "1977 Copa Libertadores". Rec.Sport.Soccer Statistics Foundation (RSSSF).
- "A torcida esperou 114 dias por uma vingança - e saiu frustrada" [The Corinthian fans waited 114 days for revenge - and left frustrated]. O Estado de S.Paulo (in Brazilian Portuguese). São Paulo. 1977-04-05. p. 30.
- Laurence, Michael (1977-05-01). "Coríntians obtém 1ª vitória na Libertadores" [Corinthians reach 1st win in Libertadores]. O Estado de S.Paulo (in Brazilian Portuguese). São Paulo. p. 54.
- "Coríntians ganha de 4 a 0 e torce esta noite" [Corinthians win 4-0 and wait tonight]. O Estado de S.Paulo (in Brazilian Portuguese). São Paulo. 1977-05-05. p. 41.
- Arruda, Marcelo Leme de; Diogo, Julio Bovi; Pontes, Ricardo. "1990 Brazil Championship". Rec.Sport.Soccer Statistics Foundation (RSSSF).
- Bobrowsky, Josef. "1991 Copa Libertadores - Details". Rec.Sport.Soccer Statistics Foundation (RSSSF).
- "Corinthians empata e dá adeus ao sonho de ser campeão do mundo" [Corinthians draw and bid farewell to the dream of being world champion]. Folha de S.Paulo (in Brazilian Portuguese). São Paulo. 1991-04-25. p. 12.
- Ciullini, Pablo. "1994 Copa Conmebol - Details". Rec.Sport.Soccer Statistics Foundation (RSSSF).
- Andrés, Juan Pablo; Ciullini, Pablo; Diogo, Julio Bovi. "1995 Copa Conmebol". Rec.Sport.Soccer Statistics Foundation (RSSSF).
- Cruz, Santiago; Arruda, Marcelo Leme de. "1995 Brazil Cup". Rec.Sport.Soccer Statistics Foundation (RSSSF).
- Stokkermans, Karel; Ciullini, Pablo. "1996 Copa Libertadores". Rec.Sport.Soccer Statistics Foundation (RSSSF).
- Ribeiro, Arnaldo (1996-05-25). "Corinthians vence, mas é eliminado" [Corinthians win, but is eliminated]. Folha de S.Paulo (in Brazilian Portuguese). São Paulo. p. 1.
- Andrés, Juan Pablo; Zea, Anthony; Gonzalez, Miguel Alvim. "1998 Copa Mercosur". Rec.Sport.Soccer Statistics Foundation (RSSSF).
- "1998 Brazil Championship". Rec.Sport.Soccer Statistics Foundation (RSSSF).
- Andrés, Juan Pablo; Ciullini, Pablo. "1999 Copa Libertadores". Rec.Sport.Soccer Statistics Foundation (RSSSF).
- "Corinthians consegue goleada histórica" [Corinthians achieves historic win]. Folha de S.Paulo (in Brazilian Portuguese). São Paulo. 1999-03-11. p. 13.
- "Palmeiras espera agora pelo River Plate" [Palmeiras are now waiting for River Plate]. O Estado de S.Paulo (in Brazilian Portuguese). São Paulo. 1999-05-13. p. 33.
- Andrés, Juan Pablo. "1999 Copa Mercosur". Rec.Sport.Soccer Statistics Foundation (RSSSF).
- Gonzalez, Miguel Alvim. "1999 Brazil Championship". Rec.Sport.Soccer Statistics Foundation (RSSSF).
- "Clubbing together on road to Brazil". BBC News. 1999-12-20.
- Vickery, Tim (1999-12-20). "Corinthians: Rewarding the faithful". BBC News.
- "Os Campeões" [All champion players]. O Estado de S.Paulo. São Paulo. 1999-12-23. p. 36.
- Bueno, Rodrigo (2000-01-02). "Fifa quer Mundial desde 1993" [FIFA wants Club World Championship since 1993]. Folha de S.Paulo (in Brazilian Portuguese). São Paulo. p. 42.
- "Corinthians benefit from controversy". BBC News. 2000-01-06.
- "Corinthians, sem empolgar, derrota o Raja" [Corinthians, without enthusiasm, defeat Raja]. O Estado de S.Paulo (in Brazilian Portuguese). São Paulo. 2000-01-06. p. 33.
- Goussinsky, Eugenio; Cordeiro, Jorge Henrique (2000-01-06). "Corinthians derrota Raja Casablanca" [Corinthians defeat Raja Casablanca] (PDF). Jornal do Brasil (in Brazilian Portuguese). Rio de Janeiro. p. 25.
- "Real rue Anelka's greed". BBC News. 2000-01-08.
- "Dida salva o Corinthians diante do real" [Dida saves Corinthians against Real]. O Estado de S.Paulo (in Brazilian Portuguese). São Paulo. 2000-01-08. p. 23.
- Santamarina, Maercio; Bueno, Rodrigo Henrique (2000-01-08). "Edilson e Anelka acendem o Mundial" [Edilson and Anelka light up the Club World Championship]. Folha de S.Paulo (in Brazilian Portuguese). São Paulo. p. 1.
- Jones, Ron (2000-01-11). "Corinthians creep into final". BBC News.
- "Corinthians, no limite, garante vaga na final" [Corinthians, on the edge, guarantee a spot in the final]. O Estado de S.Paulo (in Brazilian Portuguese). São Paulo. 2000-01-12. p. 33.
- Goussinsky, Eugenio; Cordeiro, Jorge Henrique (2000-01-12). "Corinthians é 1º finalista do Mundial" [Corinthians are the 1st finalist of the Club World Championship] (PDF). Jornal do Brasil (in Brazilian Portuguese). Rio de Janeiro. p. 24.
- Green, Alan (2000-01-12). "Vasco secure final spot". BBC News.
- Calazans, Ricardo (2000-01-13). "Vasco na decisão do Mundial" [Vasco are in the World Cup final] (PDF). Jornal do Brasil (in Brazilian Portuguese). Rio de Janeiro. p. 28.
- Green, Alan (2000-01-15). "Corinthians crowned world champions". BBC News.
- "O mundo pára (mais uma vez) nas mãos de Dida" [The world stops (once again) in Dida's hands]. O Estado de S.Paulo (in Brazilian Portuguese). São Paulo. 2000-01-15. p. 25.
- "Pela primeira vez, o mundo pertence ao Corinthians!" [For the first time, the world belongs to Corinthians!]. Folha de S.Paulo (in Brazilian Portuguese). São Paulo. 2000-01-15. p. 1.
- Assumpção, João Carlos (2000-01-15). "Final revives the Copa-94 and anguish the Maracanã". Folha de S.Paulo (in Brazilian Portuguese). São Paulo. p. 2.
- Grijó, Fabio (2000-01-15). "Um maracanazzo vascaíno" [A Vasco Maracanazzo] (PDF). Jornal do Brasil (in Brazilian Portuguese). Rio de Janeiro. p. 22.
- Andrés, Juan Pablo; Ciullini, Pablo. "2000 Copa Libertadores". Rec.Sport.Soccer Statistics Foundation (RSSSF).
- "Palmeiras repete a dose e vai a final da Libertadores" [Palmeiras do it again and go to the Libertadores final]. O Estado de S.Paulo (in Brazilian Portuguese). São Paulo. 2000-06-07. p. 29.
- Gonzalez, Miguel Alvim; Andrés, Juan Pablo; Zea, Anthony. "2000 Copa Mercosur". Rec.Sport.Soccer Statistics Foundation (RSSSF).
- Gonzalez, Miguel Alvim; Andrés, Juan Pablo. "2001 Copa Mercosur". Rec.Sport.Soccer Statistics Foundation (RSSSF).
- Ruiz, Marilia (2001-10-18). "Corinthians perde, mas elimina "irmão" da Copa Mercosul" [Corinthians lose, but eliminate "brother" from the Copa Mercosur]. Folha de S.Paulo (in Brazilian Portuguese). São Paulo. p. 3.
- Garcia, Daniel Dalence; Arruda, Marcelo Leme de. "2002 Brazil Cup". Rec.Sport.Soccer Statistics Foundation (RSSSF).
- Andrés, Juan Pablo. "2003 Copa Libertadores". Rec.Sport.Soccer Statistics Foundation (RSSSF).
- Perrone, Ricardo (2003-05-02). "Kleber perde a cabeça, e o Corinthians, o jogo" [Kleber loses his mind and Corinthians lose the match]. Folha de S.Paulo (in Brazilian Portuguese). São Paulo. p. 4.
- Vilaron, Wagner (2003-05-15). "Descontrole adia sonho corintiano" [Emotional lack of control postpones Corinthians dream]. O Estado de S.Paulo (in Brazilian Portuguese). São Paulo. p. 86.
- Gonzalez, Miguel Alvim; Andrés, Juan Pablo; Fernández, Francisco. "2003 Copa Sudamericana". Rec.Sport.Soccer Statistics Foundation (RSSSF).
- Andrés, Juan Pablo. "2005 Copa Sudamericana". Rec.Sport.Soccer Statistics Foundation (RSSSF).
- "2005 Brazil Championship". Rec.Sport.Soccer Statistics Foundation (RSSSF).
- Andrés, Juan Pablo. "2006 Copa Libertadores". Rec.Sport.Soccer Statistics Foundation (RSSSF).
- Lopes, Marcos Rogerio (2006-04-27). "Corinthians: podia ter sido bem pior" [Corinthians: it could have been much worse]. O Estado de S.Paulo (in Brazilian Portuguese). São Paulo. p. 95.
- Hecico, Fabio (2006-05-05). "Corinthians: vexame e terror" [Corinthians: shame and terror]. O Estado de S.Paulo (in Brazilian Portuguese). São Paulo. p. 70.
- "Noite de terror destrói estádio e tira o Corinthians da Libertadores" [Horror night destroys stadium and takes Corinthians from Libertadores]. Folha de S.Paulo (in Brazilian Portuguese). São Paulo. 2006-05-05.
- Andrés, Juan Pablo. "2006 Copa Sudamericana". Rec.Sport.Soccer Statistics Foundation (RSSSF).
- Andrés, Juan Pablo. "2007 Copa Sudamericana". Rec.Sport.Soccer Statistics Foundation (RSSSF).
- Homewood, Brian (2007-12-02). "Soccer-Corinthians relegated in Brazil two years after title". Reuters. Rio de Janeiro.
- Arruda, Marcelo Leme de. "2009 Brazil Cup". Rec.Sport.Soccer Statistics Foundation (RSSSF).
- Andrés, Juan Pablo. "2010 Copa Libertadores". Rec.Sport.Soccer Statistics Foundation (RSSSF).
- Fonseca, Pedro (2010-05-06). "Flamengo sink Corinthians, Estudiantes march on". Reuters. Rio de Janeiro.
- Bastos, Mariana; Fernandez, Martin; Bueno, Rodrigo (2010-05-06). "Esquema de 2009 ergue Corinthians, mas rui na 2ª etapa" [2009 tactical system lifts Corinthians, but collapses in the 2nd half]. Folha de S.Paulo (in Brazilian Portuguese). São Paulo. p. 2.
- Andrés, Juan Pablo; Lugo, Erik Francisco. "2011 Copa Libertadores". Rec.Sport.Soccer Statistics Foundation (RSSSF).
- Fonseca, Pedro (2011-02-03). "Corinthians upset in Libertadores Cup preliminary round". Reuters. Rio de Janeiro.
- Deiro, Bruno (2011-02-03). "Sonho corintiano acaba antes de começar" [Corinthians dream ends before it begins]. O Estado de S.Paulo (in Brazilian Portuguese). São Paulo. p. 103.
- "Corinthians salute Socrates with fifth title". FourFourTwo. 2011-12-04.
- Hecico, Fabio; Galdieri, Paulo; Marques, Vitor (2011-12-05). "O homem que sobreviveu à pressão" [The man who survived the pressure]. O Estado de S.Paulo (in Brazilian Portuguese). São Paulo. p. 52.
- Lugo, Erik Francisco. "2012 Copa Libertadores". Rec.Sport.Soccer Statistics Foundation (RSSSF).
- Reis, Lucas (2012-04-19). "Fartura" [Plenty]. Folha de S.Paulo (in Brazilian Portuguese). São Paulo. p. 2.
- Ramos, Raphael (2012-05-03). "Corinthians sofre e descobre Cássio" [Corinthians suffer and discover Cassio]. O Estado de S.Paulo (in Brazilian Portuguese). São Paulo. p. 70.
- Downie, Andrew (2012-05-08). "Soccer-Corinthians looks to stay alive in Libertadores Cup". Reuters.
- Reis, Lucas; Fernandez, Martin (2012-05-10). "Cabeça fria" [Cool head]. Folha de S.Paulo (in Brazilian Portuguese). São Paulo. p. 2.
- "Vasco, Corinthians serve up ugly goalless draw". Reuters. 2012-05-17.
- "Late drama sends Boca, Corinthians into last four". Reuters. 2012-05-24.
- Reis, Lucas; Rizzo, Marcel (2012-05-24). "Estilo Corinthians" [Corinthians style]. Folha de S.Paulo (in Brazilian Portuguese). São Paulo. pp. 1–2.
- Alves, Matheus Silva (2012-05-24). "Corinthians com alma e coração" [Corinthians with soul and heart]. O Estado de S.Paulo (in Brazilian Portuguese). São Paulo. p. 94.
- "Corinthians edge Santos in semi-final opener". FourFourTwo. 2012-06-14.
- Downie, Andrew (2012-06-21). "Soccer-Corinthians stand firm to reach first Libertadores final". Reuters. São Paulo.
- Reis, Lucas (2012-06-21). "A América é aqui" [America is here]. Folha de S.Paulo (in Brazilian Portuguese). São Paulo. p. 2.
- Prosperi, Luiz Antonio (2012-06-21). "Pragmatismo leva a sonhada final" [Pragmatism leads to desired final]. O Estado de S.Paulo (in Brazilian Portuguese). São Paulo. p. 91.
- "Zé Maria lembra 'batismo' do Timão na Libertadores: 'Começo do sonho'" [Zé Maria remembers Timão's 'baptism' in Libertadores: 'Beginning of the dream']. Globoesporte (in Brazilian Portuguese). 2012-06-25.
- Fonseca, Pedro (2012-06-26). "Soccer-Corinthians compared to Chelsea in Libertadores Cup". Reuters. Rio de Janeiro.
- Ampuero, Luis (2012-06-28). "Romarinho equaliser gives Corinthians edge over Boca". Reuters. Buenos Aires.
- "Romarinho strike gives Corinthians first-leg draw in Copa Libertadores". The Guardian. 2012-06-28.
- Reis, Lucas; Cobos, Paulo (2012-06-28). "Noite de herói" [Hero's night]. Folha de S.Paulo (in Brazilian Portuguese). São Paulo. pp. 1–2.
- Prosperi, Luiz Antonio (2012-06-28). "Corinthians se salva com seu herói anônimo" [Corinthians save themselves with their anonymous hero]. O Estado de S.Paulo (in Brazilian Portuguese). São Paulo. p. 84.
- "Corinthians win first Libertadores Cup". Reuters. 2012-07-05.
- "Corinthians beat Boca Juniors to win Copa Libertadores for first time". The Guardian. 2012-07-05.
- Ramos, Raphael (2012-07-05). "A noite mais feliz em quase 102 anos" [The happiest night in nearly 102 years]. O Estado de S.Paulo (in Brazilian Portuguese). São Paulo. p. 77.
- Reis, Lucas (2012-07-05). "Campeão da América" [America champions]. Folha de S.Paulo (in Brazilian Portuguese). São Paulo. pp. 1–3.
- "Soccer-Corinthians not taking final for granted, Tite says". Reuters. Tokyo. 2012-12-07.
- "Soccer-Egypt's Al-Ahly reach Club World Cup semi-finals". Reuters. Toyota. 2012-12-09.
- Downie, Andrew (2012-12-11). "Corinthians taking European style to Club World Cup". Reuters.
- "Brazil's Corinthians reach Club World Cup final". Reuters. Toyota. 2012-12-12.
- "Corinthians advance to Club World Cup final". Al Jazeera. Toyota. 2012-12-12.
- Reis, Lucas; Macedo, Sandro (2012-12-13). "Ufa!" [Phew!]. Folha de S.Paulo (in Brazilian Portuguese). São Paulo. p. 1.
- Ramos, Raphael; Marques, Vitor (2012-12-13). "Ninguém esperava tamanho sofrimento" [No one expected such suffering]. O Estado de S.Paulo (in Brazilian Portuguese). São Paulo. p. 101.
- Fifield, Dominic (2012-12-13). "Club World Cup: Chelsea cruise in to final with 3-1 win over Monterrey". The Guardian. Yokohama.
- "Corinthians 1-0 Chelsea – All Commentaries". ESPN (USA). 2012-12-16.
- Emons, Michael (2012-12-16). "Chelsea 0-1 Corinthians". BBC News. Yokohama.
- Himmer, Alastair (2012-12-16). "Corinthians stun Chelsea to win world title". Reuters. Yokohama.
- "Corinthians beat Chelsea to win FIFA Club World Cup". Deutsche Welle. 2012-12-16.
- "Corinthians beats Chelsea 1-0 in Club WCup final". Sport Illustrated. 2012-12-16.
- Fifield, Dominic (2012-12-16). "Chelsea distraught after losing to Corinthians Club in World Cup final". The Guardian. Yokohama.
- Lythell, Phil (2012-12-16). "Chelsea and Torres miss a golden chance". ESPN (USA).
- Montague, James (2012-12-16). "Corinthians: Craziest fans in the world?". CNN news. Yokohama.
- Mitten, Andy (2012-12-16). "Corinthians fans find value in success after winning Club World Cup". The National News. Yokohama.
- Ramos, Raphael; Marques, Vitor (2012-12-17). "O mundo é do Corinthians" [World belongs to Corinthians]. O Estado de S.Paulo (in Brazilian Portuguese). São Paulo. p. 48.
- Reis, Lucas; Macedo, Sandro (2012-12-17). "Donos do mundo" [Masters of the world]. Folha de S.Paulo (in Brazilian Portuguese). São Paulo. p. 8.
- Ramos, Raphael; Marques, Vitor (2012-12-17). "Cássio já está consagrado" [Cassio is acclaimed]. O Estado de S.Paulo (in Brazilian Portuguese). São Paulo. p. 49.
- Andrés, Juan Pablo; Lugo, Erik Francisco. "2013 Copa Libertadores". Rec.Sport.Soccer Statistics Foundation (RSSSF).
- "Soccer-Bolivian boy killed by flare at match against Corinthians". Reuters. Asuncion. 2013-02-21.
- Desantis, Daniela (2013-02-22). "Corinthians fans barred after Libertadores flare death". Reuters. Asuncion.
- Downie, Andrew (2013-02-28). "Soccer-Corinthians win 2-0 in empty stadium". Reuters. São Paulo.
- Gowar, Rex (2013-05-02). "LSoccer-Boca edge first leg Libertadores Cup duel with Corinthians". Reuters. São Paulo.
- Gowar, Rex (2013-05-13). "Libertadores holders Corinthians ousted by Boca". Reuters. São Paulo.
- Marques, Vitor (2013-05-16). "Juiz erra e Corinthians se despede" [Referee makes a mistake and Corinthians say goodbye]. O Estado de S.Paulo (in Brazilian Portuguese). São Paulo. p. 22.
- Andrés, Juan Pablo. "2013 Recopa Sudamericana". Rec.Sport.Soccer Statistics Foundation (RSSSF).
- "Todo Poderoso, Timão leva Recopa e afunda o ex-soberano São Paulo" ['Almighty' Timão takes Recopa and sinks 'the ex-sovereign' São Paulo]. Globoesporte (in Brazilian Portuguese). 2013-07-17.
- Reis, Rafael (2013-07-18). "Corinthians fatura sua 3ª taça internacional em um ano" [Corinthians wins their 3rd international title in a year]. Folha de S.Paulo (in Brazilian Portuguese). São Paulo. p. 1.
- Stokkermans, Karel; Lugo, Erik Francisco. "2015 Copa Libertadores". Rec.Sport.Soccer Statistics Foundation (RSSSF).
- Sheehan, Luke (2015-02-05). "Copa Libertadores Review: Home wins for Corinthians, Deportivo Tachira". The Sporting News.
- Downie, Andrew (2015-04-23). "Soccer-Three off as Sao Paulo beat Corinthians to make last 16". Reuters. São Paulo.
- Downie, Andrew (2015-05-07). "Soccer-Corinthians lose 2-0 on night of goalkeeping errors". Reuters. São Paulo.
- Vickery, Tim (2015-05-14). "Cruzeiro and Corinthians exit as Rogerio Ceni departs Libertadores". ESPN. Rio de Janeiro.
- Marques, Vitor (2015-05-14). "Corinthians perde o jogo e o rumo" [Corinthians lose the game and the direction]. O Estado de S.Paulo (in Brazilian Portuguese). São Paulo. p. 17.
- "Brazilian federation calls for Boca Juniors match-fixing probe". ESPN. São Paulo. 2015-06-25.
- "Paraguayan refs suspended over Grondona graft claims". The News. Asuncion. 2015-06-25.
- "Corinthians canter to title with three games to spare". Reuters. São Paulo. 2015-11-20.
- Stokkermans, Karel; Lugo, Erik Francisco. "2016 Copa Libertadores". Rec.Sport.Soccer Statistics Foundation (RSSSF).
- "River Plate, Corinthians eliminated from Copa Libertadores". Daiji World. Buenos Aires. 2016-05-05.
- Mattoso, Camila (2016-05-05). "Corinthians cai pela 5ª vez em sua arena" [Corinthians fall for the 5th time at their arena]. Folha de S.Paulo (in Brazilian Portuguese). São Paulo. p. 10.
- Downie, Andrew (2016-06-15). "Corinthians fury after Tite accepts Brazil job". Reuters. São Paulo.
- "Corinthians' Tite to coach Brazil after Dunga". Associated Press. São Paulo. 2016-06-15.
- Stokkermans, Karel; Lugo, Erik Francisco. "2017 Copa Sudamericana". Rec.Sport.Soccer Statistics Foundation (RSSSF).
- Savarese, Mauricio (2017-08-07). "Spotlight: Carille emerging from Tite shadow at Corinthians". Associated Press. São Paulo.
- "Racing 0-0 Corinthians: Commentaries". ESPN. 2017-09-21.
- Downie, Andrew (2017-11-16). "Corinthians beat Fluminense to take seventh league title". Reuters. São Paulo.
- Stokkermans, Karel; Lugo, Erik Francisco. "2018 Copa Libertadores". Rec.Sport.Soccer Statistics Foundation (RSSSF).
- "Lara 2-7 Corinthians: Summary". ESPN. 2018-05-17.
- "Corinthians lose 0-1 to Millonarios, top group in Copa Libertadores". EFE. 2018-05-25.
- Cara, Thiago (2018-08-29). "Corinthians vence Colo-Colo, mas leva gol de Barríos e cai pela 8ª vez nas oitavas da Libertadores" [Corinthians win Colo-Colo, but fall for the 8th time in the round of 16 of Libertadores]. ESPN (in Brazilian Portuguese).
- "Corinthians 2-1 Colo-Colo: Summary". ESPN. 2018-08-30.
- Stokkermans, Karel. "2019 Copa Sudamericana". Rec.Sport.Soccer Statistics Foundation (RSSSF).
- "Cássio se iguala a Ricardinho como o jogador com mais jogos internacionais no Corinthians". Globoesporte (in Brazilian Portuguese). 2019-08-22.
- "Underdogs Colón and Del Valle reach Copa Sudamericana final". Associated Press. São Paulo. 2019-09-27.
- Stokkermans, Karel. "2020 Copa Libertadores". Rec.Sport.Soccer Statistics Foundation (RSSSF).
- Vickery, Tim (2020-02-13). "Corinthians' early exit shows the unpredictability of the Copa Libertadores". ESPN. Rio de Janeiro.
- Salgado, Diego; Carvalho, Samir (2020-02-12). "Corinthians revive traumas e é eliminado pelo Guaraní na pré-Libertadores" [Corinthians relive trauma and aer eliminated by Guaraní in Libertadores]. UOL Esporte (in Brazilian Portuguese).
- Stokkermans, Karel. "2021 Copa Sudamericana". Rec.Sport.Soccer Statistics Foundation (RSSSF).
- Stokkermans, Karel. "2022 Copa Libertadores". Rec.Sport.Soccer Statistics Foundation (RSSSF).
- "Peñarol 4-0 Corinthians: Summary". ESPN. 2021-05-13.
- Stokkermans, Karel. "2023 Copa Libertadores". Rec.Sport.Soccer Statistics Foundation (RSSSF).
- Stokkermans, Karel. "2023 Copa Sudamericana". Rec.Sport.Soccer Statistics Foundation (RSSSF).
- Stokkermans, Karel. "2024 Copa Sudamericana". Rec.Sport.Soccer Statistics Foundation (RSSSF).
- Rodrigues, Rodolfo (2021-05-13). "Corinthians perde para o Peñarol e sofre sua maior goleada internacional" [Corinthians lose to Peñarol and suffer their biggest international defeat]. UOL (in Brazilian Portuguese).
- "Corinthians relembra seu primeiro jogo na Libertadores, ocorrido há 45 anos". Gazeta Esportiva (in Brazilian Portuguese). 2022-04-03.
- Torraga, Tales (2022-05-17). "Além do Corinthians sobre o Boca, há outro campeão invicto da Libertadores?" [Besides Corinthians over Boca, is there another undefeated Libertadores champion?]. UOL esporte (in Brazilian Portuguese). São Paulo.
- "Corinthians knock Boca out of Libertadores on penalty". Bogotá. Associated Press. 2022-07-06.
- Rimoli, Cosme (2022-07-06). "Épico, histórico, heroico. O desfalcado Corinthians sofreu como nunca. Mas eliminou o Boca da Libertadores, em plena Bombonera" [Epic, historical, heroic. With several players sidelined with injuries, Corinthians suffered like never before. But they eliminated Boca at La Bombonera]. R7 (in Brazilian Portuguese). São Paulo.
- "Perrone: 'Sem time base e padrão de jogo, VP não se ajuda no Corinthians'" [Perrone: 'Without a base team and a clear game plan, VP doesn't help himself at Corinthians']. UOL Esporte (in Brazilian Portuguese). São Paulo. 2022-08-10.
- Braga, Marcelo (2022-08-10). "Análise: Corinthians não tinha campanha de semifinalista, mas mostrou postura de time grande" [Analysis: Corinthians did not have a semifinalist campaign, but showed the attitude of a big team]. Globoesporte.com (in Brazilian Portuguese).
- Efe-Khaese, Desmond (2023-10-04). "Sudamericana: Fortaleza reaches the final for the first time after defeating Corinthians". Sambafoot.
- "Racing Defeat Corinthians and Advance to Sudamericana Final". beIN Sports. 2023-10-31.
- "Depay misses late penalty, Estudiantes advance to Libertadores semis after 17 years". ESPN Australia. 2026-09-17.
- "2022 Copa Libertadores". Globoesporte.com.
- "Club World Cup - Brazil 2000 - Final". FIFA.com.
- "2012 Libertadores Finals – 1st leg". CONMEBOL.com.
- "2012 Libertadores Finals – 2nd leg". CONMEBOL.com.
- "FIFA Club World Cup Japan 2012: Technical Report and Statistics" (PDF). FIFA.com. 6–16 December 2012.
- "Club World Cup - Japan 2012 - Final". FIFA.com.
- "2013 Recopa Sudamericana Finals – 1st leg". CONMEBOL.com.
- "2013 Recopa Sudamericana Finals – 2nd leg". CONMEBOL.com.
