= Alex Oliveira (footballer, born 1978) =

Brazilian footballer (born 1978)

Personal information
- Full name: Alexsandro Marques de Oliveira
- Date of birth: June 17, 1978 (age 48)
- Place of birth: Campinas, Brazil
- Height: 1.86 m (6 ft 1 in)
- Position: Defender

Senior career*
Years	Team	Apps	(Gls)
1997–1998	Ponte Preta		
1998	Santo André		
1998	Campinas		
1999	Portuguesa Santista		
2000–2002	Ponte Preta		
2003	Vasco da Gama		
2004	Portuguesa Desportos		
2005	Villa Rio		
2005	Ventforet Kofu	8	(2)
2007	Jeju United	1	(0)
- * Club domestic league appearances and goals

Alexsandro Marques de Oliveira (born June 17, 1978) is a Brazilian former footballer.

== Club statistics ==
Club performance			League		Cup		Total	
Season	Club	League	Apps	Goals	Apps	Goals	Apps	Goals
Japan			League		Emperor's Cup		Total	
2005	Ventforet Kofu	J2 League	8	2	0	0	8	2
Country	Japan		8	2	0	0	8	2
Total			8	2	0	0	8	2
