= 2000 FIFA Club World Championship squads =

The 2000 FIFA Club World Championship was held in Brazil between 5 January and 14 January 2000. The eight participating teams had to submit squads of 23 players at least 10 days before the start of the tournament. All players were numbered between 1 and 23, regardless of the number they wore in other competitions. Originally, only players registered to their clubs before 15 November 1999 were eligible to play in the tournament, but this cut-off point was later extended to 20 December.

== Group A ==
=== Corinthians ===
Head coach: (Brazil) Oswaldo de Oliveira

Note: Flags indicate national team as defined under FIFA eligibility rules; some limited exceptions apply. Players may hold more than one non-FIFA nationality.

No.	Pos.	Nation	Player
1	GK	BRA	Dida
2	DF	BRA	Índio
3	DF	BRA	Adílson
4	DF	BRA	João Carlos
5	MF	BRA	Vampeta
6	DF	BRA	Kléber
7	MF	BRA	Marcelinho Carioca
8	MF	COL	Freddy Rincón
9	FW	BRA	Luizão
10	FW	BRA	Edílson
11	MF	BRA	Ricardinho
12	GK	BRA	Maurício

No.	Pos.	Nation	Player
13	DF	BRA	Daniel Martins
14	DF	BRA	Márcio Costa
15	GK	BRA	Yamada
16	DF	BRA	Fábio Luciano
17	FW	BRA	Fernando Baiano
18	FW	BRA	Dinei
19	DF	BRA	Augusto
20	MF	BRA	Edu
21	MF	BRA	Marcos Senna
22	FW	BRA	Luís Mário
23	MF	BRA	Gilmar Fubá

=== Al-Nassr ===
Head coach: (Federal Republic of Yugoslavia) Milan Živadinović

Note: Flags indicate national team as defined under FIFA eligibility rules; some limited exceptions apply. Players may hold more than one non-FIFA nationality.

No.	Pos.	Nation	Player
1	GK	KSA	Mahdi Al-Dosari
2	DF	KSA	Nasser Al-Halawi
3	MF	KSA	Faisal Al-Dosari
4	DF	KSA	Saleh Abu Shahin
5	DF	MAR	Smahi Triki
6	MF	KSA	Ibrahim Al-Harbi
7	FW	KSA	Fahad Al-Mehallel
8	MF	KSA	Fahad Al-Bishi
9	DF	KSA	Hadi Sharify
10	MF	KSA	Fuad Amin
11	FW	KSA	Mohaisen Al-Jam'an
12	DF	KSA	Hamad Al-Khathran

No.	Pos.	Nation	Player
13	FW	MAR	Ahmed Bahja
14	MF	KSA	Nassip Al-Ghamdi
15	FW	KSA	Nahar Al-Dhaferi
16	DF	KSA	Abdulaziz Al-Janoubi
17	MF	KSA	Mansour Al-Mousa
18	MF	KSA	Abdallah Al-Karni
19	MF	ALG	Moussa Saïb
20	DF	KSA	Mohsin Al-Harthi
21	GK	KSA	Mohammad Sharifi
22	GK	KSA	Mohammed Al-Khojali
23	DF	KSA	Ibrahim Al-Shokia

=== Raja Casablanca ===
Head coach: (Morocco) Fathi Jamal

Note: Flags indicate national team as defined under FIFA eligibility rules; some limited exceptions apply. Players may hold more than one non-FIFA nationality.

No.	Pos.	Nation	Player
1	GK	MAR	Mustapha Chadili
2	DF	MAR	Adil Sarraj
3	DF	MAR	Redouane El Haimeur
4	DF	MAR	Talal El Karkouri
5	MF	MAR	Hicham Misbah
6	MF	MAR	Youssef Safri
7	MF	MAR	Mohamed Kharbouch
8	DF	MAR	Abdellatif Jrindou
9	FW	MAR	Mohamed Armoumen
10	FW	MAR	Mustapha Moustaoudia
11	FW	MAR	Mohamed Khoubbache
12	GK	MAR	Mohamed Bouabdellaoui

No.	Pos.	Nation	Player
13	MF	MAR	Omar Nejjary
14	FW	MAR	Bouchaib El Moubarki
15	DF	MAR	Abdessadek Hafid
16	MF	MAR	Adil Miki
17	MF	MAR	Zakaria Aboub
18	MF	MAR	Reda Ereyahi
19	MF	MAR	Youssef Achami
20	MF	MAR	Hamid Nater
21	FW	MAR	Tarik Rizki
22	GK	MAR	Abdesalam Daakali
23	FW	MAR	Said Kherazi

=== Real Madrid ===
Head coach: (Spain) Vicente del Bosque

Note: Flags indicate national team as defined under FIFA eligibility rules; some limited exceptions apply. Players may hold more than one non-FIFA nationality.

No.	Pos.	Nation	Player
1	GK	ARG	Albano Bizzarri
2	DF	ESP	Míchel Salgado
3	DF	BRA	Roberto Carlos
4	DF	ESP	Fernando Hierro
5	DF	ESP	Manolo Sanchís
6	MF	ARG	Fernando Redondo
7	FW	ESP	Raúl
8	MF	ENG	Steve McManaman
9	FW	ESP	Fernando Morientes
10	MF	ESP	Manu Sánchez
11	FW	BRA	Sávio
12	DF	ESP	Iván Campo

No.	Pos.	Nation	Player
13	GK	ESP	Iker Casillas
14	MF	ESP	Guti
15	DF	ESP	Iván Helguera
16	FW	CMR	Samuel Eto'o
17	DF	ESP	Javier Dorado
18	DF	ESP	Aitor Karanka
19	FW	FRA	Nicolas Anelka
20	FW	YUG	Perica Ognjenović
21	DF	CMR	Geremi
22	MF	FRA	Christian Karembeu
23	GK	ESP	Oliver

== Group B ==
=== Manchester United ===
Head coach: (Scotland) Alex Ferguson

Note: Flags indicate national team as defined under FIFA eligibility rules; some limited exceptions apply. Players may hold more than one non-FIFA nationality.

No.	Pos.	Nation	Player
1	GK	AUS	Mark Bosnich
2	DF	ENG	Gary Neville
3	DF	IRL	Denis Irwin
4	DF	ENG	Danny Higginbotham
5	DF	FRA	Mikaël Silvestre
6	DF	NED	Jaap Stam
7	MF	ENG	David Beckham
8	MF	ENG	Nicky Butt
9	FW	ENG	Andy Cole
10	FW	ENG	Teddy Sheringham
11	MF	WAL	Ryan Giggs
12	DF	ENG	Phil Neville

No.	Pos.	Nation	Player
13	GK	ENG	Paul Rachubka
14	MF	NED	Jordi Cruyff
15	MF	ENG	Jonathan Greening
16	MF	IRL	Roy Keane
17	GK	NED	Raimond van der Gouw
18	MF	ENG	Mark Wilson
19	FW	TRI	Dwight Yorke
20	FW	NOR	Ole Gunnar Solskjær
21	DF	NOR	Henning Berg
22	FW	RSA	Quinton Fortune
23	MF	ENG	Ronnie Wallwork

=== Necaxa ===
Head coach: (Mexico) Raúl Arias

Note: Flags indicate national team as defined under FIFA eligibility rules; some limited exceptions apply. Players may hold more than one non-FIFA nationality.

No.	Pos.	Nation	Player
1	GK	MEX	Hugo Pineda
2	DF	MEX	Salvador Cabrera
3	DF	MEX	Sergio Almaguer
4	DF	MEX	Ignacio Ambriz
5	DF	URU	Andrés Scotti
6	DF	MEX	Miguel Acosta
7	MF	ECU	Álex Aguinaga
8	MF	MEX	Luis Ernesto Pérez
9	FW	ECU	Agustín Delgado
10	DF	MEX	Markus López
11	MF	MEX	Samuel Terres
12	MF	ARG	Hernán Vigna

No.	Pos.	Nation	Player
13	FW	MEX	Carlos Ochoa
14	MF	MEX	Israel Velázquez
15	DF	MEX	Octavio Becerril
16	MF	MEX	Edgar Oliva
17	GK	MEX	Alexandro Álvarez
18	DF	MEX	José Milián
19	FW	CHI	Cristian Montecinos
20	DF	MEX	José Higareda
21	FW	URU	Sergio Vázquez
22	GK	MEX	José Alberto Guadarrama
23	DF	MEX	Jaime Hernández

=== South Melbourne ===
Head coach: (Australia) Ange Postecoglou

Note: Flags indicate national team as defined under FIFA eligibility rules; some limited exceptions apply. Players may hold more than one non-FIFA nationality.

No.	Pos.	Nation	Player
1	GK	HUN	Milán Udvarácz
2	DF	AUS	Steven Iosifidis
3	DF	AUS	Fausto De Amicis
4	DF	AUS	Nick Orlic
5	DF	AUS	Con Blatsis
6	MF	AUS	David Clarkson
7	MF	AUS	Steve Panopoulos
8	FW	NZL	Vaughan Coveny
9	FW	AUS	Paul Trimboli
10	FW	AUS	Michael Curcija
11	FW	AUS	John Anastasiadis
12	MF	AUS	Richie Alagich

No.	Pos.	Nation	Player
13	MF	AUS	Adrian Cuzzupe
14	MF	AUS	Anthony Magnacca
15	DF	AUS	Goran Lozanovski
16	MF	AUS	George Goutzioulis
17	FW	AUS	Jim Tsekinis
18	DF	AUS	Robert Liparoti
19	MF	AUS	Tas Psonis
20	GK	AUS	Chris Jones
21	MF	AUS	Radoslav Culibrk
22	MF	AUS	Mustafa Mustafa
23	GK	AUS	Chris Roche

=== Vasco da Gama ===
Head coach: (Brazil) Antônio Lopes

Note: Flags indicate national team as defined under FIFA eligibility rules; some limited exceptions apply. Players may hold more than one non-FIFA nationality.

No.	Pos.	Nation	Player
1	GK	BRA	Carlos Germano
2	DF	BRA	Jorginho
3	DF	BRA	Odvan
4	DF	BRA	Mauro Galvão
5	MF	BRA	Amaral
6	MF	BRA	Felipe
7	FW	BRA	Donizete
8	MF	BRA	Juninho
9	MF	BRA	Ramon Menezes
10	FW	BRA	Edmundo
11	FW	BRA	Romário
12	GK	BRA	Helton

No.	Pos.	Nation	Player
13	DF	BRA	Gilberto
14	DF	BRA	Alexandre Torres
15	MF	BRA	Paulo Miranda
16	MF	BRA	Pedrinho
17	DF	BRA	Júnior Baiano
18	MF	BRA	Válber
19	FW	BRA	Viola
20	GK	BRA	Márcio
21	MF	BRA	Nasa
22	DF	BRA	Valkmar
23	MF	BRA	Alex Oliveira
