= Primera División de México Invierno 1998 =

Primera División de México
- Season: 1998–99
- Champions: Necaxa (3rd title)
- Champions' Cup: Necaxa
- Copa Libertadores: Monterrey
- Top goalscorer: Cuauhtémoc Blanco (16 goals)

Primera División de México (Mexican First Division) Invierno 1998 is a Mexican football tournament - one of two short tournaments that take up the entire year to determine the champions of Mexican football. It began on Friday, July 31, 1998, and ran until November 22, when the regular season ended. Pachuca was promoted to the Primera División de México thus, Veracruz was relegated to the Primera División A. In the final Necaxa defeated Guadalajara and became champions for the 3rd time.

== Clubs ==
Location of the Primera División Invierno 1998 teams

Team	City	Stadium
América	Mexico City	Azteca
Atlante	Mexico City	Azteca
Atlas	Guadalajara, Jalisco	Jalisco
Atlético Morelia	Morelia, Michoacán	Morelos
Celaya	Celaya, Guanajuato	Miguel Alemán Valdés
Cruz Azul	Mexico City	Azul
Guadalajara	Guadalajara, Jalisco	Jalisco
León	León, Guanajuato	León
Monterrey	Monterrey, Nuevo León	Tecnológico
Necaxa	Mexico City	Azteca
Pachuca	Pachuca, Hidalgo	Hidalgo
Puebla	Puebla, Puebla	Cuauhtémoc
Santos Laguna	Torreón, Coahuila	Corona
Toluca	Toluca, State of Mexico	Estadio Nemesio Díez
Toros Neza	Nezahualcóyotl, State of Mexico	Neza 86
UAG	Zapopan, Jalisco	Tres de Marzo
UANL	San Nicolás de los Garza, Nuevo León	Universitario
UNAM	Mexico City	Olímpico Universitario

== Regular phase ==
Group 1
Pos	Team	Pld	W	D	L	GF	GA	GD	Pts	Qualification
1	Cruz Azul	17	12	4	1	41	14	+27	40	Directly qualified to the Liguilla (Playoffs)
2	Guadalajara	17	10	4	3	34	25	+9	34	Directly qualified to the Liguilla (Playoffs)
3	Celaya	17	6	4	7	28	29	−1	22	
4	León	17	4	4	9	25	34	−9	16	
5	Puebla	17	2	3	12	13	41	−28	9	

Source: MedioTiempo

Group 2
Pos	Team	Pld	W	D	L	GF	GA	GD	Pts	Qualification
1	Atlético Morelia	17	8	3	6	28	28	0	27	Directly qualified to the Liguilla (Playoffs)
2	UNAM	17	7	5	5	26	20	+6	26	Directly qualified to the Liguilla (Playoffs)
3	América	17	6	4	7	30	31	−1	22	
4	Pachuca	17	5	1	11	28	39	−11	16	
5	Toros Neza	17	2	3	12	18	36	−18	9	

Source: MedioTiempo

Group 3
Pos	Team	Pld	W	D	L	GF	GA	GD	Pts	Qualification
1	Necaxa	17	10	2	5	36	22	+14	32	Directly qualified to the Liguilla (Playoffs)
2	UAG	17	9	4	4	31	23	+8	31	Directly qualified to the Liguilla (Playoffs)
3	Atlante	17	5	4	8	22	30	−8	19	
4	Monterrey	17	4	7	6	20	30	−10	19	

Source: MedioTiempo

Group 4
Pos	Team	Pld	W	D	L	GF	GA	GD	Pts	Qualification
1	Toluca	17	10	6	1	39	14	+25	36	Directly qualified to the Liguilla (Playoffs)
2	Atlas	17	8	2	7	34	28	+6	26	Directly qualified to the Liguilla (Playoffs)
3	UANL	17	5	7	5	30	28	+2	22	
4	Santos Laguna	17	4	5	8	22	33	−11	17	

Source: MedioTiempo

== League table ==
Pos	Team	Pld	W	D	L	GF	GA	GD	Pts	Qualification
1	Cruz Azul	17	12	4	1	41	14	+27	40	Advance to Liguilla (Playoffs)
2	Toluca	17	10	6	1	39	14	+25	36	Advance to Liguilla (Playoffs)
3	Guadalajara	17	10	4	3	34	25	+9	34	Advance to Liguilla (Playoffs)
4	Necaxa (C)	17	10	2	5	36	22	+14	32	Advance to Liguilla (Playoffs)
5	UAG	17	9	4	4	31	23	+8	31	Advance to Liguilla (Playoffs)
6	Atlético Morelia	17	8	3	6	28	28	0	27	Advance to Liguilla (Playoffs)
7	Atlas	17	8	2	7	34	28	+6	26	Advance to Liguilla (Playoffs)
8	UNAM	17	7	5	5	26	20	+6	26	Advance to Liguilla (Playoffs)
9	UANL	17	5	7	5	30	28	+2	22	
10	América	17	6	4	7	30	31	−1	22	
11	Celaya	17	6	4	7	28	29	−1	22	
12	Atlante	17	5	4	8	22	30	−8	19	
13	Monterrey	17	4	7	6	20	30	−10	19	
14	Santos Laguna	17	4	5	8	22	33	−11	17	
15	León	17	4	4	9	25	34	−9	16	
16	Pachuca	17	5	1	11	28	39	−11	16	
17	Toros Neza	17	2	3	12	18	36	−18	9	
18	Puebla	17	2	3	12	13	41	−28	9	

Source: MedioTiempo
(C) Champions

== Top goalscorers ==
Players sorted first by goals scored, then by last name. Only regular season goals listed.

Rank	Player	Club	Goals
1	(Mexico) Cuauhtémoc Blanco	América	16
2	(Paraguay) José Cardozo	Toluca	13
2	(Honduras) Carlos Pavón	Necaxa	13
4	(Argentina) Federico Lagorio	Atlas	12
5	(Argentina) Alejandro Glaría	Pachuca	11
5	(Mexico) Pedro Pineda	Necaxa	11
7	(Brazil) Claudinho	Morelia	10
7	(Chile) Claudio Núñez	UANL	10
9	(Mexico) Luis García	Guadalajara	8
9	(Mexico) Luis Hernández	UANL	8

Source: MedioTiempo

== Results ==
Home \ Away	AME	ATE	ATS	ATM	CEL	CAZ	GDL	LEO	MTY	NEC	PAC	PUE	SAN	TOL	TRN	UAG	UNL	UNM
América	—	1–1	–	–	1–0	1–1	0–0	–	–	2–0	–	–	–	–	0–1	1–3	–	5–2
Atlante	–	—	–	–	0–0	0–2	1–0	–	–	0–3	–	1–0	–	–	2–0	2–3	2–2	1–0
Atlas	1–1	1–0	—	–	2–0	1–2	3–2	–	–	1–2	–	–	–	–	–	4–1	–	2–0
Atlético Morelia	1–2	2–2	4–3	—	–	2–1	1–0	–	–	2–1	–	–	–	–	–	0–0	–	1–1
Celaya	–	–	–	0–2	—	–	–	4–1	0–0	–	0–0	1–0	–	1–1	1–2	–	–	–
Cruz Azul	–	–	–	–	5–0	—	2–2	–	–	1–1	–	1–0	2–0	–	5–2	2–2	3–1	1–2
Guadalajara	–	–	–	–	0–0	–	—	1–1	–	1–2	2–0	0–2	0–1	–	1–2	4–0	2–0	–
León	2–1	2–2	2–0	3–3	–	1–1	–	—	2–1	–	0–0	–	–	1–2	–	–	1–5	–
Monterrey	3–2	1–1	0–0	1–1	–	1–2	2–1	–	—	–	–	–	–	–	–	3–1	–	2–2
Necaxa	–	–	–	–	2–1	–	–	2–0	4–0	—	5–2	3–0	4–0	1–2	1–2	–	–	–
Pachuca	1–3	1–1	1–2	5–3	–	1–1	–	–	1–1	–	—	–	–	2–4	–	–	3–1	1–0
Puebla	1–1	–	2–3	2–2	–	–	–	3–0	2–1	–	3–0	—	2–0	2–0	–	–	1–3	–
Santos Laguna	3–1	0–3	0–2	2–0	–	–	–	2–1	1–0	–	1–1	–	—	3–0	–	–	0–3	–
Toluca	1–2	0–0	1–1	–	–	1–0	0–1	–	2–3	2–1	–	–	–	—	–	–	–	2–0
Toros Neza	–	–	1–2	3–1	–	–	–	1–0	1–0	–	3–2	1–2	0–0	1–0	—	–	–	–
UAG	–	–	–	–	3–1	–	–	3–1	–	0–1	0–2	0–1	2–0	1–2	1–1	—	–	–
UANL	1–3	–	4–1	2–0	3–3	–	–	–	2–1	2–0	–	–	–	1–4	2–1	2–1	—	–
UNAM	–	–	–	–	1–0	–	0–2	1–2	–	2–2	–	5–1	0–2	–	1–1	1–2	2–2	—

Updated to match(es) played on 22 November 1998. Source: RSSSF
Legend: Blue = home team win; Yellow = draw; Red = away team win.

== Final phase (Liguilla) ==
=== Bracket ===
Quarterfinals
3	Guadalajara	1	4	5
6	Atlético Morelia	1	1	2
1	Cruz Azul	2	1	3
8	UNAM	3	1	4
4	Necaxa (s)	0	3	3
5	UAG	2	1	3
2	Toluca	2	0	2
7	Atlas	1	2	3

Semifinals
3	Guadalajara	1	1	2
8	UNAM	1	0	1
4	Necaxa	0	3	3
7	Atlas	0	2	2

Finals
3	Guadalajara	0	0	0
4	Necaxa	0	2	2

=== Quarterfinals ===
November 26, 1998
15:00

Atlético Morelia	1–1	Guadalajara
Graziani 28'	Report	Peláez 43'

Estadio Morelos, Morelia
Referee: Pascual Rebolledo (Veracruz)
November 29, 1998
12:00

Guadalajara	4–1	Atlético Morelia
Peláez 39'; Arellano 71'; García 74', 88'	Report	Graziani 75' (pen.)

Estadio Jalisco, Guadalajara
Referee: Armando Archundia (Estado de México)

Guadalajara won 5–2 on aggregate.

November 25, 1998
20:00

UNAM	3–2	Cruz Azul
Sánchez 41'; Álvarez 69', 73'	Report	Sosa 46'; Palencia 55'

Estadio Olímpico Universitario, Mexico City
Referee: Eduardo Brizio Carter (Mexico City)
November 28, 1998
17:00

Cruz Azul	1–1	UNAM
Palencia 48'	Report	Lozano 86'

Estadio Azul, Mexico City
Referee: Felipe Ramos Rizo (Mexico City)

UNAM won 4–3 on aggregate.

November 25, 1998
20:30

UAG	2–0	Necaxa
Palacios 47' da Silva 52'	Report

Estadio Tres de Marzo, Zapopan
Referee: Edgar Ulises Rangel (Estado de México)
November 29, 1998
17:00

Necaxa	3–1	UAG
Vázquez 12'; López 24'; Vega 40' (o.g.)	Report	Muf 90'

Estadio Azteca, Mexico City
Referee: Gilberto Alcalá Pineda (Mexico City)

3–3 on aggregate. Necaxa advanced for being the higher seeded team.

November 26, 1998
20:45

Atlas	1–2	Toluca
López 85'	Report	Abundis 21'; Carmona 26'

Estadio Jalisco, Guadalajara
Referee: León Padró Borja (Guanajuato)
November 29, 1998
15:00

Toluca	0–2	Atlas
	Report	López 34'; Rodríguez 67'

Estadio Nemesio Díez, Toluca
Referee: Antonio Marrufo (Chihuahua)

Atlas won 3–2 on aggregate.

=== Semifinals ===
December 3, 1998
20:00

UNAM	1–1	Guadalajara
Álvarez 19'	Report	Peláez 14'

Estadio Olímpico Universitario, Mexico City
Referee: Eduardo Brizio Carter (Mexico City)
December 6, 1998
12:00

Guadalajara	1–0	UNAM
García 50'	Report

Estadio Jalisco, Guadalajara
Referee: Antonio Marrufo (Chihuahua)

Guadalajara won 2–1 on aggregate.

December 3, 1998
20:45

Atlas	0–0	Necaxa
	Report

Estadio Jalisco, Guadalajara
Referee: Pascual Rebolledo (Veracruz)
December 6, 1998
17:00

Necaxa	3–2	Atlas
Hermosillo 28', 78'; Vázquez 49'	Report	Lagorio 16'; Rodríguez 47'

Estadio Azteca, Mexico City
Referee: León Padró Borja (Guanajuato)

Necaxa won 3–2 on aggregate.

=== Final ===
First leg

December 10, 1998
17:00

Necaxa	0–0	Guadalajara
	Report

Estadio Azteca, Mexico City
Referee: Eduardo Brizio Carter (Mexico City)

Necaxa:
GK	25	(Mexico) Adolfo Ríos
DF	20	(Mexico) José Higareda
DF	19	(Chile) Eduardo Vilches	(yellow card) 34' (red card) 84'
DF	3	(Mexico) Sergio Almaguer
DF	5	(Mexico) José Luis Montes de Oca	(yellow card) 70'
DF	2	(Mexico) Salvador Cabrera
DF	4	(Mexico) Markus López
MF	7	(Ecuador) Álex Aguinaga (c)		(substituted off) 90'
MF	21	(Uruguay) Sergio Vázquez	(yellow card) 38'
MF	10	(Argentina) Sergio Zárate		(substituted off) 83'
FW	27	(Mexico) Carlos Hermosillo
Substitutions:
MF	16	(Mexico) David Oliva		(substituted on) 83'
MF	6	(Mexico) José Manuel de la Torre		(substituted on) 90'
Manager:
(Mexico) Raúl Arias

Guadalajara:
GK	1	(Mexico) Martín Zúñiga
DF	15	(Mexico) Paulo César Chávez	(yellow card) 7'
DF	8	(Mexico) Joel Sánchez
DF	4	(Mexico) Claudio Suárez
MF	14	(Mexico) Felipe de Jesús Robles
MF	28	(Mexico) Jesús Arellano
MF	6	(Mexico) Alberto Coyote (c)	(yellow card) 74'
MF	7	(Mexico) Ramón Ramírez
MF	10	(Mexico) Luis García		(substituted off) 77'
MF	11	(Mexico) Manuel Martínez
FW	9	(Mexico) Ricardo Peláez
Substitutions:
DF	3	(Mexico) Héctor Castro		(substituted on) 77'
Manager:
(Brazil) Ricardo Ferretti

Second leg

December 13, 1998
12:00

Guadalajara	0–2	Necaxa
	Report	Cabrera 54'; Vázquez 87'

Estadio Jalisco, Guadalajara
Referee: Pascual Rebolledo (Veracruz)

Necaxa won 2–0 on aggregate.

Guadalajara:
GK	1	(Mexico) Martín Zúñiga
DF	15	(Mexico) Paulo César Chávez
DF	8	(Mexico) Joel Sánchez
DF	4	(Mexico) Claudio Suárez
MF	14	(Mexico) Felipe de Jesús Robles		(substituted off) 79'
MF	28	(Mexico) Jesús Arellano	(yellow card) 66'
MF	6	(Mexico) Alberto Coyote (c)
MF	7	(Mexico) Ramón Ramírez
MF	10	(Mexico) Luis García		(substituted off) 85'
MF	11	(Mexico) Manuel Martínez		(substituted off) 74'
FW	9	(Mexico) Ricardo Peláez
Substitutions:
DF	3	(Mexico) Héctor Castro		(substituted on) 74'
FW	17	(Mexico) Héctor Del Ángel		(substituted on) 79'
DF	2	(Mexico) Noe Zárate		(substituted on) 85'
Manager:
(Brazil) Ricardo Ferretti

Necaxa:
GK	25	(Mexico) Adolfo Ríos
DF	20	(Mexico) José Higareda	(yellow card) 28'
DF	3	(Mexico) Sergio Almaguer
DF	4	(Mexico) Markus López	(yellow card) 82'
DF	5	(Mexico) José Luis Montes de Oca
DF	2	(Mexico) Salvador Cabrera	(yellow card) 61'
MF	6	(Mexico) José Manuel de la Torre		(substituted off) 79'
MF	7	(Ecuador) Álex Aguinaga (c)
MF	21	(Uruguay) Sergio Vázquez
MF	10	(Argentina) Sergio Zárate		(substituted off) 85'
FW	27	(Mexico) Carlos Hermosillo		(substituted off) 90'
Substitutions:
MF	13	(Mexico) Marco Antonio Sánchez		(substituted on) 79'
MF	12	(Argentina) Raúl Gordillo		(substituted on) 85'
MF	16	(Mexico) David Oliva		(substituted on) 90'
Manager:
(Mexico) Raúl Arias

Champions

3rd title
