= 1999 CONCACAF Champions' Cup =

35th edition of premier club football tournament organized by CONCACAF

- 1999 CONCACAF Champions' Cup logo

Tournament details
- Host country: United States
- City: Whitney, Nevada
- Dates: September 28 – October 3
- Teams: 8 (from 5 associations)
- Venue(s): Sam Boyd Stadium

Final positions
- Champions: (Mexico) Necaxa (1st title)
- Runners-up: (Costa Rica) Alajuelense

Tournament statistics
- Matches played: 8
- Goals scored: 18 (2.25 per match)

The 1999 CONCACAF Champions' Cup was the 35th edition of the annual international club football competition held in the CONCACAF region (North America, Central America and the Caribbean), the CONCACAF Champions' Cup. It determined that year's club champion of association football in the CONCACAF region.

The Final Tournament was held at Sam Boyd Stadium in Whitney, Nevada in the United States. Necaxa defeated Alajuelense in the final by a score of 2-1.

== Qualified teams ==
=== North American zone ===
- Major League Soccer:
  (United States) Chicago Fire - 1998 MLS Cup winner
  (United States) D.C. United - 1998 MLS Cup runner-up
  (United States) Los Angeles Galaxy - 1998 MLS Supporters' Shield winner
- Primera División de México:
  (Mexico) Toluca - 1998 Verano winner
  (Mexico) Club Necaxa - 1998 Invierno winner

=== Central American zone ===
- 1999 UNCAF Interclub Cup:
  (Honduras) Olimpia - Central Zone final round first place
  (Costa Rica) Alajuelense - Central Zone final round second place
  (Costa Rica) Deportivo Saprissa - Central Zone final round third place

=== Caribbean zone ===
- 1998 CFU Club Championship:
  (Trinidad and Tobago) Joe Public F.C. - Caribbean Zone winner

== Qualifying playoff ==
August 18, 1999
PST

LA Galaxy (United States)	1–1	(Mexico) Necaxa
Hendrickson 1'		79' Oliva
Penalties
	3–4

Rose Bowl, Pasadena, United States
Attendance: 10,019
- Necaxa advances to the Quarterfinals

== Bracket ==
Quarterfinals
(United States) D.C. United	1
(Honduras) Olimpia	0
(Mexico) Necaxa	3
(Costa Rica) Deportivo Saprissa	2
(United States) Chicago Fire	2
(Trinidad and Tobago) Joe Public	0
(Mexico) Toluca	0
(Costa Rica) Alajuelense	1

Semifinals
(United States) D.C. United	1
(Mexico) Necaxa	3
(United States) Chicago Fire	1 (4)
(Costa Rica) Alajuelense (p)	1 (5)

Final
(Mexico) Necaxa	2
(Costa Rica) Alajuelense	1
Third place
(United States) D.C. United	2
(United States) Chicago Fire	2

== Quarterfinals ==
September 28, 1999
PST

Alajuelense (Costa Rica)	1–0	(Mexico) Toluca
Miso 58'

Sam Boyd Stadium, Whitney, United States
Attendance: 6,521
Referee: Jose Farias (CAN)

September 28, 1999
PST

Chicago Fire (United States)	2–0	(Trinidad and Tobago) Joe Public
Razov 19'; Kovalenko 82'

Sam Boyd Stadium, Whitney, United States
Attendance: 6,521
Referee: Victorino Rodríguez (SLV)

September 29, 1999
PST

Necaxa (Mexico)	3–2	(Costa Rica) Saprissa
Delgado 14' 64'; Vásquez 37'

Sam Boyd Stadium, Whitney, United States
Attendance: 7,127
Referee: Peter Prendergast (JAM)

September 29, 1999
PST

D.C. United (United States)	1–0	(Honduras) Olimpia
Moreno 68'

Sam Boyd Stadium, Whitney, United States
Attendance: 7,127
Referee: Carlos Batres (GUA)

== Semifinals ==
October 1, 1999
PST

Alajuelense (Costa Rica)	1–1	(United States) Chicago Fire
Muñoz 22'		38' Kosecki
Penalties
	5–4

Sam Boyd Stadium, Whitney, United States
Attendance: 8,163
Referee: Peter Prendergast (JAM)

October 1, 1999
PST

D.C. United (United States)	1–3	(Mexico) Necaxa
Talley 26'		40' Almaguer; 57' Delgado; 68' Oliva

Sam Boyd Stadium, Whitney, United States
Attendance: 8,163
Referee: Carlos Batres (GUA)

== Third place match ==
October 3, 1999
PST

Chicago Fire (United States)	2–2	(United States) D.C. United
Razov 71'; Marsch 80'		2' Wood; 50' Otero

Sam Boyd Stadium, Whitney, United States
Referee: Rafael Pedrosa
- Third place was shared.

== Final ==
October 3, 1999
PST

Necaxa (Mexico)	2–1	(Costa Rica) Alajuelense
Aguinaga 47'; Vázquez 66'		35' (pen.) Miso

Sam Boyd Stadium, Whitney, Nevada, U.S.
Referee: Jose Farias (CAN)

Team details

Necaxa	Alajuelense

GK	1	(Mexico) Hugo Pineda
DF	2	(Mexico) Salvador Cabrera
DF	3	(Mexico) Sergio Almaguer
DF	5	(Mexico) José L. Montes de Oca
DF	14	(Mexico) Germán Villa
MF	12	(Argentina) Hernán Vigna
MF	16	(Mexico) David Oliva	(substituted off) 88'
MF	21	(Uruguay) Sergio Vázquez
MF	7	(Ecuador) Alex Aguinaga
FW	24	(Mexico) Jaime Hernández
FW	9	(Ecuador) Agustín Delgado
Substitutions:
MF	4	(Mexico) Ignacio Ambriz	(substituted in) 88'
Manager:
(Mexico) Raúl Arias

GK	1	(Costa Rica) Alvaro Mesen
DF	2	(Costa Rica) Javier Delgado
DF	15	(Costa Rica) Harold Wallace
DF	14	(Costa Rica) Enrique Smith
DF	19	(Costa Rica) Sandro Alfaro	(substituted off) 52'
MF	5	(Costa Rica) Luis Arnáez
MF	6	(Costa Rica) Wilmer López
MF	7	(Costa Rica) Wilson Muñoz	(substituted off) 69'
MF	24	(Costa Rica) Pablo Chinchilla
FW	21	(Brazil) Essinho
FW	9	(Slovakia) Josef Miso
Substitutes:
MF	11	(Costa Rica) Carlos Castro	(substituted in) 52' (substituted off) 80'
MF	10	(Argentina) Pablo Izaguirre	(substituted off) 69'
FW	13	(Costa Rica) Heriberto Quirós	(substituted off) 80'
Manager:
(Portugal) Guilherme Farinha

== Champion ==
CONCACAF Champions' Cup
1999 Winners

Necaxa
Second Title

- Necaxa qualifies for the 2000 FIFA Club World Championship.
- 1975 - First title under the organization name of Atlético Español.
