= Daniel Martins =

Daniel Martins may refer to:

- Daniel Martins (footballer, born 1972), Brazilian–Equatoguinean footballer
- Daniel Martins (Portuguese footballer) (born 1993)
- Dan Martins, or Daniel Hayden Martins, American bishop
- Daniel Martins (athlete) (born 1996), Brazilian Paralympic athlete

== See also ==
- Daniel Guimarães (born 1987), Brazilian footballer
- Daniel Martens (born 1999), Singaporean footballer
