= Hadi Sharify =

Saudi Arabian footballer

Hadi Sharify (born 19 December 1977) is a Saudi Arabian football defender who plays for Al Hazm Club in Saudi Arabia.

== Club career ==
Sharifi was in Al-Nasr's squad for the 2000 FIFA Club World Championship.

== International career ==
Sharify made one appearance with the senior Saudi Arabia national football team during the 2006 FIFA World Cup qualifying rounds.
