= Hernán Vigna =

Argentine footballer

Personal information
- Full name: Hernán Vigna
- Date of birth: 26 April 1977 (age 49)
- Place of birth: Buenos Aires, Argentina
- Height: 1.75 m (5 ft 9 in)
- Position: Right-back

Senior career*
Years	Team	Apps	(Gls)
1992–1996	San Telmo		
1997–1998	Boca Juniors		
1999	Cádiz		
1999–2003	Necaxa		
2001	→ Puebla (loan)		
2002	→ Santos Laguna (loan)		
2003	Independiente		
2004	Cobreloa		
2005	Caracas		
2005–2007	Huracán		
2008–2009	San Telmo		
- * Club domestic league appearances and goals as of 18 March 2010

Hernán Vigna (born 26 April 1977) is an Argentine former footballer who played for clubs of Argentina, Chile, Mexico, Spain and Venezuela.

== Honours ==
=== Club ===
Necaxa

- CONCACAF Champions' Cup: 1999
- FIFA Club World Cup: Third Place - 2000

Cobreloa

- Primera División de Chile (1): 2004 Clausura
