= Fernando Yamada =

Brazilian footballer (born 1979)

Personal information
- Full name: Fernando Yamada
- Date of birth: February 17, 1979 (age 47)
- Place of birth: Ribeirão Pires, Brazil
- Height: 1.86 m (6 ft 1 in)
- Position: Goalkeeper

Youth career
- 1993–1999: Corinthians

Senior career*
Years	Team	Apps	(Gls)
1998–2003	Corinthians		
2003	Noroeste		
2004	Sãocarlense		
2004–2005	Portuguesa Santista		
2006	Guaratinguetá		
2006	Anapolina		
2006	ADAP Galo Maringá		
2007	Central		
2008	Taubaté		
2008	Bragantino		
2009	São Bento		
2010	ABC		
2011–2013	Grêmio Osasco		
2014	Audax Rio		

International career
1995	Brazil U17		
- * Club domestic league appearances and goals

Fernando Yamada (born 17 February 1979) is a Brazilian former goalkeeper.

== Honours ==
Corinthians

- Copa São Paulo de Futebol Júnior: 1999
- FIFA Club World Cup: 2000
- Campeonato Paulista: 2001

ABC

- Taça Cidade de Natal: 2010
- Campeonato Potiguar: 2010
