= Josef Miso =

Slovak footballer

Personal information
- Date of birth: 18 October 1973 (age 53)
- Place of birth: Trnava, Czechoslovakia
- Height: 1.82 m (6 ft 0 in)
- Position: Forward

Senior career*
Years	Team	Apps	(Gls)
1992–1994	Spartak Trnava		
1994–1995	→ Piešťany (loan)		
1995–2003	Alajuelense	208	(73)
2004	Brujas		(0)
2004	Carmelita	9	(1)
2005	→ Santos (loan)	7	(0)
2005–2006	Herediano	23	(10)
2006	Sandefjord	4	(2)
2007	Herediano	13	(4)
2008	Municipal Grecia		
2008	Santacruceña		

Managerial career
- ~2012~: UCEM Alajuela (women)
- 2012–2013: Pérez Zeledón (assistant)
- 2013–2014: Carmelita (assistant)
- 2014–2015: Municipal Liberia
- * Club domestic league appearances and goals

Josef Miso (born 18 October 1973) is a Slovak former football player who last played for Municipal Grecia in the Costa Rican Second Division.

== Club career ==
Miso played for hometown club Spartak Trnava before being loaned to Piešťany.

=== Alajuelense ===
He made his debut in Costa Rican Primera División on 29 October 1995 against Guanacasteca playing with Alajuelense, he soon become part of the usuals at the starting line-up and one of the most claimed players.

He has been known as a quick and intelligent striker with an assisting ability. He also has an ability to score from short, middle and long distances free kicks. During his spend in Alajuelense, he was known for remaining calm after he scored. He scored a lot of long-distance goals.

He was part of the great Alajuelense team that won four Costa Rican Championships in a row, coming back from a long injury and scoring two goals at the final game against, he also won two Copa Interclubes UNCAF championships and was part of the team that lost the final of the CONCACAF Champions' Cup against Necaxa, back in 1999. He was awarded as the best foreign player of the national tournament in 1997 and he also was the top scorer during the 1999 season. He also played the Copa Merconorte with LD Alajuelense.

The striker, suffered an injury by the end of 1999 season, when he was having his best times, that made him miss the rest of the season and most of the 2000-2001 season and was criticized by a part of the fans for being injured that long, he also lost some directive's trust. Even though, he had a few good games by the end of the season and scored 2 goals at the final game of the year against CS Herediano, giving his team the championship. He had another regular campaign on 2001-2002 season winning again the national title. The LD Alajuelense's managing decided to give another year-deal but he never returned to be the player they needed him to be, so once the contract expired he left the club.

=== Herediano ===
He finished the 2003 season unemployed. Suddenly by the end of the 2004 season he was signed by Carmelita and then, loaned to Santos de Guápiles, 2 non-traditional local teams but he was separated for his low level and again ended up unemployed. Suddenly, when his career seemed to be over, Herediano, the third best team in the country, decided to give him a chance. He took advantage of the chance playing like his old days and becoming part of the every-Sunday starting line-up, returning close to his old high level. He received an international offer from Sandefjord in Norway due his performance, but his lack of opportunities made him come back to Herediano 6 months later. There was a new coach and some new players so he decided to retired of the team.

=== Second Division and retirement ===
After a few months out of the pitches he started to play for Municipal Grecia that was currently in 1st place of the Costa Rican Second Division in order to help them get the promotion. He became a good deal for them, because he started to play well, scoring goals and bringing a lot of fans to the stadium. Unfortunately for them, the team lost the final game and did not make to the first division. He was released by Grecia in June 2008 and had a final season with Santacruceña.

Miso has scored more goals in the Costa Rican Championship, with a total of 88, than any other foreigner, and he is remembered in Alajuela for his former fans with flags and songs.

== Managerial career ==
After retiring, Miso became assistant manager at Pérez Zeledón and then Carmelita. In February 2015, Miso was replaced as manager of Municipal Liberia by Uruguayan Orlando de León, after the Slovak had led the team through some poor performances.

In 2012, he already was coach of the women team UCEM Alajuela.

== Honours ==
- Primera División de Costa Rica (6):
  - 1995-96, 1996–97, 1999-00, 2000–01, 2001–02, 2002–03
- Copa Interclubes UNCAF (2):
  - 1996, 2002
