= Javier Dorado =

Spanish footballer (1977–2025)

Personal information
- Full name: Francisco Javier Dorado Bielsa
- Date of birth: 17 February 1977
- Place of birth: Talavera de la Reina, Spain
- Date of death: 27 February 2025 (aged 48)
- Place of death: Palma de Mallorca, Spain
- Height: 1.80 m (5 ft 11 in)
- Position: Left-back

Youth career
- Real Madrid

Senior career*
Years	Team	Apps	(Gls)
1996–1997	Real Madrid C	30	(0)
1997–1999	Real Madrid B	46	(2)
1999–2002	Real Madrid	2	(0)
2000–2001	→ Salamanca (loan)	32	(0)
2001–2002	→ Sporting Gijón (loan)	34	(1)
2002–2003	Rayo Vallecano	12	(0)
2003–2006	Sporting Gijón	112	(1)
2006–2008	Mallorca	2	(0)
2011–2012	Atlético Baleares	10	(0)
Total		280	(4)

International career
1998–2000	Spain U21	4	(0)
- * Club domestic league appearances and goals

Francisco Javier Dorado Bielsa (17 February 1977 – 27 February 2025) was a Spanish professional footballer who played as a left-back.

== Club career ==
Dorado was born in Talavera de la Reina, Province of Toledo. A youth product of La Liga powerhouse Real Madrid, he played two league matches for the first team during the 1999–2000 season, the first being a 1–1 away draw against Valencia CF on 20 February 2000; his competitive debut was also against Valencia, in a 6–0 loss in the Copa del Rey also at the Mestalla Stadium. He was included in Real's 2000 FIFA Club World Championship squad, where he missed one of the penalties in the third-place playoff that was lost to Club Necaxa following a shootout. After that, he had Segunda División loan stints with UD Salamanca and Sporting de Gijón.

In 2002–03, Dorado returned to Madrid and the top flight, also playing as backup with Rayo Vallecano. The following campaign he returned to Gijón as the undisputed first-choice, going on to compete in the second tier a further three years.

In July 2006, Dorado joined RCD Mallorca on a one-year contract, but would be virtually absent from the team's lineups during his spell, blocked by ex-FC Barcelona and future Spain international Fernando Navarro. He was released by the Balearic Islands club in July 2008 following an anterior cruciate ligament injury, with only seven competitive appearances to his credit.

== Death ==
Dorado died on 27 February 2025 at the age of 48, from leukemia.
