= Federico Lagorio =

Argentine association footballer

Personal information
- Full name: Federico Carlos Lagorio
- Date of birth: 28 July 1975 (age 51)
- Place of birth: Argentina
- Position: Striker

Senior career*
Years	Team	Apps	(Gls)
1993–1998	Gimnasia	89	(16)
1998–1999	Atlas		
1999–2000	Pumas		
2000–2001	Marítimo		
2002–2003	Newell's	7	(1)
2003–2004	Ferro	31	(12)
2005	Blooming		
2005	César Vallejo		
2006	Cienciano		
- * Club domestic league appearances and goals

Federico Carlos Lagorio (born 28 July 1975) is an Argentine former footballer who last played as a striker for Cienciano.

== Early life ==
Lagorio was nicknamed "Carucha" and joined the youth academy of Argentine side Gimnasia as a youth player.

== Club career ==
He started his career with Argentine side Gimnasia, where he was regarded as an important player for the club as they achieved second place during the 1994–95 Argentine Primera División. In 1999, he signed for Mexican side Pumas, where he was regarded to have performed well. In 2000, he signed for Portuguese side Marítimo. On 5 November 2000, he scored a hat-trick during a 3–0 win over Benfica. In 2001, he suffered an injury while playing for the club.

== International career ==
Lagorio was called up to a Argentina national under-23 football team training camp for 1996 Summer Olympics qualifying, where he suffered an injury.

== Post-playing career ==
After retiring from professional football, Lagorio worked at a gas station.

== Personal life ==
Lagorio has been married to a former volleyball player. He has regarded Netherlands international Patrick Kluivert as his football idol.
