= Salvador Cabrera =

Mexican football midfielder (born 1973)

Personal information
- Full name: Salvador Cabrera Aguirre
- Date of birth: 21 August 1973 (age 53)
- Place of birth: Mexico City, Mexico
- Height: 6 ft 0 in (1.83 m)
- Position: Defensive midfielder

Senior career*
| Years | Team | Apps | (Gls) |
| 1994–2000 | Necaxa | 122 | (6) |
| 1996–1997 | → Irapuato (loan) | 28 | (3) |
| 2001 | Atlante | 36 | (2) |
| 2002–2003 | Necaxa | 60 | (2) |
| 2003–2004 | Puebla | 31 | (2) |
| 2004 | Pachuca Juniors | 18 | (1) |
| 2005–2007 | Necaxa | 59 | (0) |
| 2007 | Dorados (carnet) | 3 | (0) |
| Total | | 357 | (16) |

International career
| 1999–2000 | Mexico | 9 | (0) |
- * Club domestic league appearances and goals

Salvador Cabrera Aguirre (born 21 August 1973) is a Mexican former professional footballer who played as a defensive midfielder.

== Club career ==
A defensive midfielder also capable of playing at the back, Cabrera made his debut with Necaxa during the club's title-winning 1994–95 season. He also appeared in the club's successful championship defense the following year, but only became a regular starter during the Invierno 1997 season. During the 1988 Invierno season, Cabrera won his third championship and his first as a major contributor, scoring the championship-winning goal in the final with a long-range shot against Chivas. He joined Atlante in 2001 but returned to Necaxa in 2002, helping the club reach the 2002 Verano final. Afterward, Necaxa fell into decline, and Cabrera's role began to diminish by the middle of the decade. His last top-flight appearances for the club came in the Clausura 2007 tournament.

Cabrera also participated for Necaxa in international club events. He appeared in the final of the 1999 CONCACAF Champions' Cup, which Necaxa won against LD Alajuelense of Costa Rica. In addition, Cabrera participated in the 2000 FIFA Club World Cup, where Necaxa finished in third place and scored in the game against South Melbourne FC.

== International career ==
He also earned 10 caps for the Mexico national team, all of them under the direction of former Necaxa coach Manuel Lapuente. Cabrera's first cap came in Los Angeles on February 10, 1999, against Argentina. He made one appearance at the 1999 Copa América, replacing Gerardo Torrado in a 3–1 victory over Venezuela on July 6. Cabrera's last cap came at the 2000 CONCACAF Gold Cup on February 20, 2000, when Mexico was eliminated from the tournament in a 2-1 golden goal defeat against Canada.

== Honours ==
Necaxa

- Mexican Primera División: 1994–95, 1995–96, Invierno 1998
- Copa México: 1994–95
- Campeón de Campeones: 1995
- CONCACAF Champions' Cup: 1999
- CONCACAF Cup Winners Cup: 1994
