= Youssef Achami =

Moroccan footballer

Personal information
- Date of birth: 31 July 1976 (age 50)
- Place of birth: Agadir, Morocco
- Height: 1.87 m (6 ft 2 in)
- Position: Forward

Senior career*
Years	Team	Apps	(Gls)
–2003	Raja Casablanca	0	(0)
2003–2004	K.V.S.K. United	0	(0)
2004–2005	FC Eindhoven	16	(4)
- * Club domestic league appearances and goals

Youssef Achami (born 31 July 1976 in Agadir) is a former Moroccan footballer.

== Club career ==
Achami was part of the generation of Raja Casablanca players who experienced a period of exceptional success, with the club winning six consecutive Botola titles and two Moroccan Throne Cups. Achami helped Raja Casablanca win the 2000 CAF Super Cup and scored a goal for the club in the group stage of the 2000 FIFA Club World Championship.

In 2003, Achami moved abroad, joining Belgian third division side K.V.S.K. United Overpelt-Lommel where he led the club in scoring with 15 goals. A spell in the Netherlands with FC Eindhoven followed.

After he retired from playing football, Achami became a coach. He had spells as assistant manager at Wydad Casablanca and OC Safi.
