= Fábio Luciano =

Brazilian footballer (born 1975)

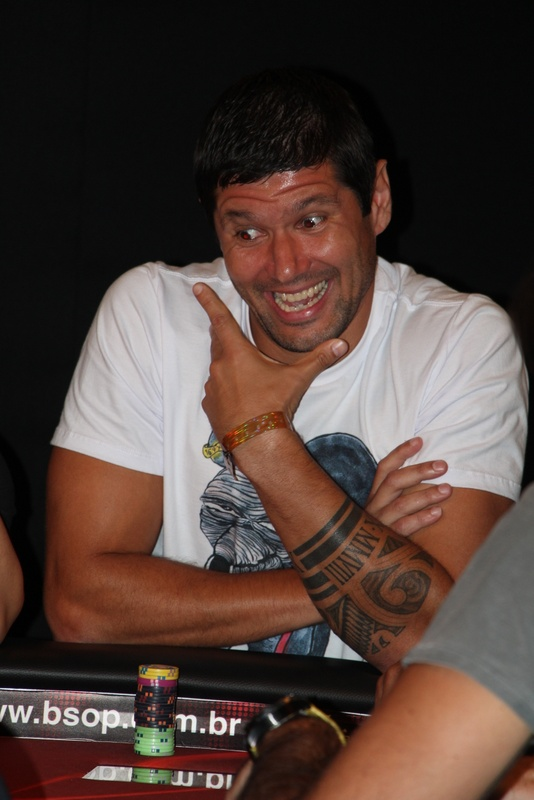
- Fábio Luciano in 2015

Personal information
- Date of birth: April 29, 1975 (age 51)
- Place of birth: Vinhedo, Brazil
- Height: 1.90 m (6 ft 3 in)
- Position: Centre-back

Youth career
- Ponte Preta

Senior career*
Years	Team	Apps	(Gls)
1996–1999	Ponte Preta	31	(0)
2000–2003	Corinthians	58	(6)
2001	→ Internacional (loan)	19	(1)
2003–2006	Fenerbahçe	90	(11)
2007	1. FC Köln	12	(0)
2007–2009	Flamengo	54	(4)
Total		287	(36)

International career
2003	Brazil	1	(0)
- * Club domestic league appearances and goals

Fábio Luciano (born April 29, 1975) is a Brazilian football pundit and retired player who played as a centre-back. He also has Italian citizenship. He played for Brazil's major clubs Corinthians and Flamengo, being very well recognized by the supports from both clubs and for several other clubs including Turkish team Fenerbahçe.

== Career ==
=== Early career ===
His youth playing was brought up at the Brazilian club Ponte Preta. After showing good talent, Internacional showed interest in him. After buying him, Corinthians had gained an even bigger interest. After some time, they made a move.

=== Fenerbahçe ===
After spending a couple of years at Corinthians, he was transferred to Turkish club Fenerbahçe in 2003. He was selected a couple times for Brazil after showing consistent performances for Fenerbahçe in the 2003–2004 season. In August 2006 his contract with Fenerbahçe was cancelled about his six-month injury.

He is notorious for his presence in the attack, as shown in many games with his former club Fenerbahçe, having scored goals with headers from dead ball situations and even supported the forward line unexpectedly. He became a fan favorite with his spectacular dead ball goals for Fenerbahçe fans.

In January 2007, he signed a six-month contract with 2. Bundesliga side 1. FC Köln.

=== Flamengo ===
By mid-2007, Luciano signed a six-month contract with Brazilian side Flamengo. He debuted on August 11, 2007 against Náutico in Maracanã and was granted the captain armband by coach Joel Santana. On the same match he scored his first goal for the club, and since then started a strong connection with Flamengo supporters, especially the younger ones, who were not old enough to remember idols of the older days. He renewed his contract until the end of 2008 season and then extended it for another year.

In May 2009, after winning the Rio state championship, Luciano decided to retire.

== Career statistics ==
Appearances and goals by club, season and competition
Club	Season	League			State League (Note: Includes Carioca League.)		National cup (Note: Includes Copa do Brasil, DFB-Pokal.)		Continental		Total	
Club	Season	Division	Apps	Goals	Apps	Goals	Apps	Goals	Apps	Goals	Apps	Goals
1. FC Köln	2006–07	2. Bundesliga	12	0	–		0	0	–		22	2
Flamengo	2007	Série A	22	2	–		–		–		22	2
Flamengo	2008	Série A	32	2	13	2	–		7 (Note: Appearances in Copa Libertadores)	0	52	4
Flamengo	2009	Série A	–		18	1	1	0	–		19	1
Flamengo	Total		54	4	31	3	1	0	7	0	93	7
Career total			66	4	31	3	1	0	7	0	105	7

== Honours ==
Corinthians

- FIFA Club World Championship: 2000
- Rio-São Paulo Tournament: 2002
- São Paulo State Championship: 2001, 2003
- Brazilian Cup: 2002

Fenerbahçe

- Süper Lig: 2004, 2005

Flamengo

- Taça Guanabara: 2008
- Taça Rio: 2009
- Rio de Janeiro State League: 2008, 2009

Individual

- Bola de Prata: best central defender of the 2002 Brazilian Série A
