= Daniel Martins (footballer, born 1972) =

Equatoguinean footballer

Personal information
- Full name: Daniel Sabino Martins
- Date of birth: 8 May 1972 (age 54)
- Place of birth: Vitória, Espírito Santo, Brazil
- Height: 1.73 m (5 ft 8 in)
- Position: Right back

Youth career
- Vitória-ES

Senior career*
Years	Team	Apps	(Gls)
1988–1998	Desportiva Capixaba		
1994	→ Catuense (loan)		
1997	→ São Mateus (loan)		
1999–2000	Ponte Preta		
2000	→ Corinthians (loan)		
2001–2004	Palmeiras	51	(2)
2002	→ Ponte Preta (loan)		

International career
2006	Equatorial Guinea	1	(1)
2006	Equatorial Guinea B		
- * Club domestic league appearances and goals

Daniel Sabino Martins (born 8 May 1972) is a retired professional footballer who played as a right back.

Born in Brazil, he spent his entire club career there, featuring in the Campeonato Brasileiro Série A for AA Ponte Preta and Palmeiras. One year after becoming a free agent from the latter, he accepted to be a member, as a naturalized citizen, of the Equatorial Guinea national team, playing for them in early 2006. It was his last football experience in active.

== Biography ==
Martins was born in Vitória, the capital of the Brazilian state of Espírito Santo.

In 2000, he signed with Corinthians. Martins participated in the pilot edition of the FIFA Club World Championship, being champion with his then club.

He then played for several years in the Palmeiras, winning the 2003 Série B title with the squad.

== International career ==
Martins also played for Equatorial Guinea in 2006 and was champion of the CEMAC Cup.

=== International goals ===
#	Date	Venue	Opponent	Score	Result	Competition
1	26 February 2006	Stade de l'Amitié, Cotonou, Benin	Benin	1–0	1–0	Friendly

== Titles ==
Season	Club / National team	Title
2000	Corinthians	FIFA Club World Championship
2003	Palmeiras	Série B
2006	Equatorial Guinea	CEMAC Cup

== Last contract ==
- Palmeiras: 5 January to 31 December 2004
