= Markus López =

Mexican footballer (born 1972)

Personal information
- Full name: Markus López Winkler
- Date of birth: 17 June 1972 (age 54)
- Place of birth: Mexico
- Positions: Defender; midfielder

Senior career*
Years	Team	Apps	(Gls)
1992–1994	Querétaro	50	(1)
1994–1998	Tecos	101	(13)
1998–1999	Necaxa	39	(3)
1999	América	12	(0)
2000–2001	Necaxa	64	(0)
2002	Puebla	5	(0)

International career
1995–1997	Mexico	10	(0)
- * Club domestic league appearances and goals

Markus López Winkler (born 17 June 1972) is a Mexican former footballer who played as a defender or midfielder.

== Early life ==
He started his career with Mexican side Querétaro. He debuted for the club at the age of twenty.

== Career ==
In 2000, he signed for Mexican side Necaxa. He played in the FIFA Club World Championship while playing for the club.

== Personal life ==
He was born in 1972 in Mexico. He moved from Mexico City, Mexico to Querétaro, Mexico at the age of six.
