= 2000 FIFA Club World Championship =

Inaugural FIFA Club World Cup

Campeonato Mundial de Clubes da FIFA Brasil 2000

Tournament details
- Host country: Brazil
- Dates: 5–14 January
- Teams: 8 (from 6 confederations)
- Venues: 2 (in 2 host cities)

Final positions
- Champions: (Brazil) Corinthians (1st title)
- Runners-up: (Brazil) Vasco da Gama
- Third place: (Mexico) Necaxa
- Fourth place: (Spain) Real Madrid

Tournament statistics
- Matches played: 14
- Goals scored: 43 (3.07 per match)
- Attendance: 514,000 (36,714 per match)
- Top scorer(s): Romário (Vasco da Gama); Nicolas Anelka (Real Madrid); 3 goals each
- Best player: Edílson (Corinthians)
- Best goalkeeper: Dida (Corinthians)

The 2000 FIFA Club World Championship was the inaugural FIFA Club World Cup, the world club championship for men's club association football teams. It took place in Brazil from 5 to 14 January 2000. FIFA as football's international governing body selected Brazil as the host nation on 8 June 1999 as the bid was found to be the strongest among four candidates. The draw was made at the Copacabana Palace in Rio de Janeiro on 14 October 1999. All matches were played in either Rio de Janeiro's Estádio do Maracanã or São Paulo's Estádio do Morumbi.

Eight teams, two from South America, two from Europe and one each from North America, Africa, Asia and Oceania entered the tournament. The first Club World Cup match took place in São Paulo and saw Spanish club Real Madrid beat Saudi Arabian side Al-Nassr 3–1; Real Madrid's Nicolas Anelka scored the first goal in Club World Cup history in the 21st minute. Later the same day, Corinthians goalkeeper Dida kept the first clean sheet in the tournament as his team beat Moroccan side Raja Casablanca 2–0.

Corinthians and Vasco da Gama each won their respective groups to qualify for the final. In front of a crowd of 73,000, the final finished as a 0–0 draw after extra time. The title was decided by a penalty shoot-out which Corinthians won 4–3. As winners, Corinthians received $6 million in prize money, while Vasco da Gama received $5 million. Necaxa beat Real Madrid in the match for third place to claim $4 million. Real Madrid received $3 million, and the other remaining teams were awarded $2.5 million.

== Host bids ==
Initially, there were nine candidates to host the competition: China, Brazil, Mexico, Paraguay, Saudi Arabia, Tahiti, Turkey, the United States and Uruguay; of the nine, only Saudi Arabia, Mexico, Brazil and Uruguay confirmed their interest to FIFA. On 7 June 1999, the FIFA Emergency Committee appointed Brazil as hosts of the competition during their meeting in Cairo, Egypt.

== Qualified teams ==
Location of teams of the 2000 FIFA Club World Cup

The clubs that played in the tournament were:

Team	Confederation	Qualification	Participation
(Brazil) Corinthians	CONMEBOL (host)	Winners of the 1998 Campeonato Brasileiro	Debut
(Morocco) Raja Casablanca	CAF	Winners of the 1999 CAF Champions League	Debut
(Saudi Arabia) Al-Nassr	AFC	Winners of the 1998 Asian Super Cup	Debut
(England) Manchester United	UEFA	Winners of the 1998–99 UEFA Champions League	Debut
(Mexico) Necaxa	CONCACAF	Winners of the 1999 CONCACAF Champions' Cup	Debut
(Australia) South Melbourne	OFC	Winners of the 1999 Oceania Club Championship	Debut
(Brazil) Vasco da Gama	CONMEBOL	Winners of the 1998 Copa Libertadores	Debut
(Spain) Real Madrid	UEFA	Winners of the 1998 Intercontinental Cup	Debut

== Venues ==
São Paulo	2000 FIFA Club World Championship is located in Brazil	Rio de Janeiro
Morumbi	2000 FIFA Club World Championship is located in Brazil	Maracanã
23°36′0″S 46°43′12″W	2000 FIFA Club World Championship is located in Brazil	22°54′42″S 43°13′49″W
Capacity: 80,000	2000 FIFA Club World Championship is located in Brazil	Capacity: 103,022

== Squads ==
For a list of the squads at the 2000 FIFA Club World Championship, see 2000 FIFA Club World Championship squads.

== Match officials ==
Eight referees were appointed from the six continental confederations, each along with an accompanying assistant referee.

Confederation	Referee(s)	Assistant(s)
AFC	(Kuwait) Saad Mane	(Kazakhstan) Sergei Ufimtsev
CAF	(Senegal) Falla N'Doye	(Uganda) Ali Tomusangue
CONCACAF	(Costa Rica) William Mattus	(Trinidad and Tobago) Haseeb Mohammed
CONMEBOL	(Argentina) Horacio Elizondo (Colombia) Óscar Ruiz	(Paraguay) Miguel Giacomuzzi (Uruguay) Fernando Cresci
OFC	(New Zealand) Derek Rugg	(Samoa) Lavetala Siuamoa
UEFA	(Italy) Stefano Braschi (Netherlands) Dick Jol	(Denmark) Jens Larsen (Poland) Jacek Pociegiel

== Format ==
Matches were played in São Paulo and Rio de Janeiro. The teams were organised in two groups of four teams, with the top team in each group going through to the final and the two second-placed teams contesting a match for third place.

== Group stage ==
=== Group A ===
Pos	Team	Pld	W	D	L	GF	GA	GD	Pts	Qualification
1	(Brazil) Corinthians	3	2	1	0	6	2	+4	7	Advance to final
2	(Spain) Real Madrid	3	2	1	0	8	5	+3	7	Advance to match for third place
3	(Saudi Arabia) Al-Nassr	3	1	0	2	5	8	−3	3	
4	(Morocco) Raja Casablanca	3	0	0	3	5	9	−4	0	

Source: FIFA
5 January 2000
18:45

Real Madrid (Spain)	3–1	(Saudi Arabia) Al-Nassr
Anelka 21'; Raúl 61'; Sávio 69' (pen.)	Report	Al-Bishi 45+1' (pen.)

Estádio do Morumbi, São Paulo
Attendance: 12,000
Referee: Óscar Ruiz (Colombia)
5 January 2000
21:15

Corinthians (Brazil)	2–0	(Morocco) Raja Casablanca
Luizão 50'; Fábio Luciano 64'	Report

Estádio do Morumbi, São Paulo
Attendance: 23,000
Referee: Stefano Braschi (Italy)

7 January 2000
18:45

Real Madrid (Spain)	2–2	(Brazil) Corinthians
Anelka 19', 71'	Report	Edílson 28', 64'

Estádio do Morumbi, São Paulo
Attendance: 55,000
Referee: William Mattus (Costa Rica)
7 January 2000
21:15

Raja Casablanca (Morocco)	3–4	(Saudi Arabia) Al-Nassr
Al-Bishi 25' (o.g.) (Note: Some sources credit Raja Casablanca's first goal to Omar Nejjary. However, the FIFA Technical Study Group awarded it as an own goal, as Nejjary's free kick deflected off Al-Nassr's Fahad Al-Bishi. Some sources mistakenly credit the own goal to Mahdi Al-Dosari (who was not on the pitch) or Mohaisen Al-Jam'an.); El Moubarki 67'; El Karkouri 73'	Report	Al-Amin 4'; Bahja 49'; Al-Bishi 51'; Saïb 86'

Estádio do Morumbi, São Paulo
Attendance: 3,000
Referee: Derek Rugg (New Zealand)

10 January 2000
18:45

Real Madrid (Spain)	3–2	(Morocco) Raja Casablanca
Hierro 49'; Morientes 53'; Geremi 88'	Report	Achami 28'; Moustaoudia 59'

Estádio do Morumbi, São Paulo
Attendance: 18,000
Referee: Horacio Elizondo (Argentina)
10 January 2000
21:15

Al-Nassr (Saudi Arabia)	0–2	(Brazil) Corinthians
	Report	Ricardinho 24'; Rincón 81'

Estádio do Morumbi, São Paulo
Attendance: 31,000
Referee: Dick Jol (Netherlands)

=== Group B ===
Pos	Team	Pld	W	D	L	GF	GA	GD	Pts	Qualification
1	(Brazil) Vasco da Gama	3	3	0	0	7	2	+5	9	Advance to final
2	(Mexico) Necaxa	3	1	1	1	5	4	+1	4	Advance to match for third place
3	(England) Manchester United	3	1	1	1	4	4	0	4	
4	(Australia) South Melbourne	3	0	0	3	1	7	−6	0	

Source: FIFA
6 January 2000
18:15

Manchester United (England)	1–1	(Mexico) Necaxa
Yorke 81'	Report	Montecinos 14'

Estádio do Maracanã, Rio de Janeiro
Attendance: 50,000
Referee: Horacio Elizondo (Argentina)
6 January 2000
20:45

Vasco da Gama (Brazil)	2–0	(Australia) South Melbourne
Felipe 53'; Edmundo 86'	Report

Estádio do Maracanã, Rio de Janeiro
Attendance: 66,000
Referee: Dick Jol (Netherlands)

8 January 2000
18:15

Manchester United (England)	1–3	(Brazil) Vasco da Gama
Butt 81'	Report	Romário 24', 26'; Edmundo 43'

Estádio do Maracanã, Rio de Janeiro
Attendance: 73,000
Referee: Saad Mane (Kuwait)
8 January 2000
20:45

South Melbourne (Australia)	1–3	(Mexico) Necaxa
Anastasiadis 45+2'	Report	Montecinos 19' (pen.); Delgado 29'; Cabrera 79' (pen.)

Estádio do Maracanã, Rio de Janeiro
Attendance: 5,000
Referee: Falla Ndoye (Senegal)

11 January 2000
18:15

Manchester United (England)	2–0	(Australia) South Melbourne
Fortune 8', 20'	Report

Estádio do Maracanã, Rio de Janeiro
Attendance: 25,000
Referee: Stefano Braschi (Italy)
11 January 2000
20:45

Necaxa (Mexico)	1–2	(Brazil) Vasco da Gama
Aguinaga 5'	Report	Odvan 14'; Romário 69'

Estádio do Maracanã, Rio de Janeiro
Attendance: 45,000
Referee: Óscar Ruiz (Colombia)

== Knockout stage ==
Final
(Brazil) Corinthians (p)	0 (4)
(Brazil) Vasco da Gama	0 (3)
Match for third place
(Spain) Real Madrid	1 (3)
(Mexico) Necaxa (p)	1 (4)

=== Match for third place ===
14 January 2000
17:00

Real Madrid (Spain)	1–1 (a.e.t.)	(Mexico) Necaxa
Raúl 15'	Report	Delgado 58'
Penalties
Eto'o (penalty scored); Helguera (penalty scored); McManaman (penalty missed); Morientes (penalty scored); Dorado (penalty missed)	3–4	(penalty scored) Vázquez; (penalty missed) Cabrera; (penalty scored) Pérez; (penalty scored) Aguinaga; (penalty scored) Delgado

Estádio do Maracanã, Rio de Janeiro
Attendance: 35,000
Referee: Óscar Ruiz (Colombia)

=== Final ===
14 January 2000
20:00

Corinthians (Brazil)	0–0 (a.e.t.)	(Brazil) Vasco da Gama
	Report
Penalties
Rincón (penalty scored); Fernando Baiano (penalty scored); Luizão (penalty scored); Edu (penalty scored); Marcelinho (penalty missed)	4–3	(penalty scored) Romário; (penalty scored) Alex Oliveira; (penalty missed) Gilberto; (penalty scored) Viola; (penalty missed) Edmundo

Estádio do Maracanã, Rio de Janeiro
Attendance: 73,000
Referee: Dick Jol (Netherlands)

== Goalscorers ==
Rank	Player	Team	Goals
1	(France) Nicolas Anelka	(Spain) Real Madrid	3
1	(Brazil) Romário	(Brazil) Vasco da Gama	3
3	(Saudi Arabia) Fahad Al-Bishi	(Saudi Arabia) Al-Nassr	2
3	(Ecuador) Agustín Delgado	(Mexico) Necaxa	2
3	(Brazil) Edílson	(Brazil) Corinthians	2
3	(Brazil) Edmundo	(Brazil) Vasco da Gama	2
3	(South Africa) Quinton Fortune	(England) Manchester United	2
3	(Chile) Cristian Montecinos	(Mexico) Necaxa	2
3	(Spain) Raúl	(Spain) Real Madrid	2
10	(Morocco) Youssef Achami	(Morocco) Raja Casablanca	1
10	(Ecuador) Álex Aguinaga	(Mexico) Necaxa	1
10	(Saudi Arabia) Fuad Amin	(Saudi Arabia) Al-Nassr	1
10	(Australia) John Anastasiadis	(Australia) South Melbourne	1
10	(Morocco) Ahmed Bahja	(Saudi Arabia) Al-Nassr	1
10	(England) Nicky Butt	(England) Manchester United	1
10	(Mexico) Salvador Cabrera	(Mexico) Necaxa	1
10	(Morocco) Talal El Karkouri	(Morocco) Raja Casablanca	1
10	(Morocco) Bouchaib El Moubarki	(Morocco) Raja Casablanca	1
10	(Brazil) Felipe	(Brazil) Vasco da Gama	1
10	(Cameroon) Geremi	(Spain) Real Madrid	1
10	(Spain) Fernando Hierro	(Spain) Real Madrid	1
10	(Brazil) Fábio Luciano	(Brazil) Corinthians	1
10	(Brazil) Luizão	(Brazil) Corinthians	1
10	(Spain) Fernando Morientes	(Spain) Real Madrid	1
10	(Morocco) Mustapha Moustaoudia	(Morocco) Raja Casablanca	1
10	(Brazil) Odvan	(Brazil) Vasco da Gama	1
10	(Brazil) Ricardinho	(Brazil) Corinthians	1
10	(Colombia) Freddy Rincón	(Brazil) Corinthians	1
10	(Algeria) Moussa Saïb	(Saudi Arabia) Al-Nassr	1
10	(Brazil) Sávio	(Spain) Real Madrid	1
10	(Trinidad and Tobago) Dwight Yorke	(England) Manchester United	1

1 own goal

- (Saudi Arabia) Fahad Al-Bishi (Al-Nassr, against Raja Casablanca)

== Awards ==
The following awards were given at the conclusion of the tournament.

Adidas Golden Ball	Adidas Silver Ball	Adidas Bronze Ball
(Brazil) Edílson (Corinthians)	(Brazil) Edmundo (Vasco da Gama)	(Brazil) Romário (Vasco da Gama)
Adidas Golden Shoe		Adidas Bronze Shoe
(France) Nicolas Anelka (Real Madrid) (Brazil) Romário (Vasco da Gama)		(Ecuador) Agustín Delgado (Necaxa) (Brazil) Edílson (Corinthians) (Brazil) Edmundo (Vasco da Gama)
3 goals, 0 assists		2 goals, 1 assist
FIFA Fair Play Award
(Saudi Arabia) Al-Nassr

Additionally, FIFA named an all-star team consisting of eleven starters and seven substitutes.

FIFA All-Star Team
Goalkeepers	Defenders	Midfielders	Forwards
(Brazil) Dida (Corinthians)	(Mexico) Sergio Almaguer (Necaxa); (Spain) Fernando Hierro (Real Madrid); (Spain) Míchel Salgado (Real Madrid); (Netherlands) Jaap Stam (Manchester United)	(Brazil) Felipe (Vasco da Gama); (Republic of Ireland) Roy Keane (Manchester United); (Colombia) Freddy Rincón (Corinthians); (Brazil) Sávio (Real Madrid)	(Ecuador) Agustín Delgado (Necaxa); (Brazil) Romário (Vasco da Gama)
Substitutes
(Brazil) Helton (Vasco da Gama)	(Mexico) José Milián (Necaxa)	(Brazil) Amaral (Vasco da Gama); (Brazil) Juninho (Vasco da Gama)	(Morocco) Ahmed Bahja (Al-Nassr); (Brazil) Edílson (Corinthians); (Chile) Cristián Montecinos (Necaxa)

== Aftermath and legacy ==
Following the inaugural Club World Cup, FIFA pledged further editions of the tournament. The first of these was slated for Spain in 2001, with an expected 12 participants. By March of that year, group draws had even taken place. However, the second edition of the tournament was called off due to a range of factors involving partners and sponsorships, with the collapse of International Sport and Leisure, FIFA's marketing partner at the time, being the most significant. The event was then rescheduled for 2003, but it didn't come to fruition either. It wasn't until 2004 that FIFA was able to officially announce the second edition of the tournament.

From the 2005 edition onwards, the competition has been held continuously but under a new format, featuring single-elimination tournament instead of a group stage plus final, and with a shorter duration, addressing scheduling concerns for national federations and continental confederations. While the two subsequent editions, 2005 and 2006, included only the six continental champions, from the 2007 edition onwards, the number of participants increased to seven – the seventh spot was typically reserved for the national champion of the host country. However, to prevent the recurrence of two clubs from the same country, as happened in 2000, FIFA introduced a mechanism: if the continental champion hailed from the host country, the national champion of that country would forfeit its spot, which would then go to the highest-ranked team from another country in the continental competition.
