= 1993 Santos FC season =

Santos
1993 season
- President: Marcelo Teixeira
- Manager: Evaristo de Macedo; Antônio Lopes; Pepe
- Campeonato Brasileiro: 5th
- Campeonato Paulista: 4th
- Supercopa Libertadores: First stage
- Torneio Rio-São Paulo: Group stage
- Top goalscorer: League: Guga (14); All: Guga (29)

The 1993 season was Santos FC's eighty-first season in existence and club's thirty-fourth in the top flight of Brazilian football since Brasileirão era.

== Players ==
=== Squad ===
Note: Flags indicate national team as defined under FIFA eligibility rules; some limited exceptions apply. Players may hold more than one non-FIFA nationality.

No.	Pos.	Nation	Player
—	GK	BRA	Gomes
—	GK	BRA	Maurício
—	GK	BRA	Nilton
—	GK	BRA	Robson
—	GK	BRA	Velloso
—	DF	BRA	Camilo
—	DF	BRA	Dinho
—	DF	BRA	Eduardo
—	DF	BRA	Índio
—	DF	BRA	Júnior
—	DF	BRA	Lula
—	DF	BRA	Marcelo Fernandes
—	DF	BRA	Marcos Paulo
—	DF	BRA	Maurício Copertino
—	DF	BRA	Ricardo Rocha
—	DF	BRA	Silva

No.	Pos.	Nation	Player
—	MF	BRA	Axel
—	MF	BRA	Cuca
—	MF	BRA	Darci
—	MF	BRA	Gallo
—	MF	BRA	Marcelo Passos
—	MF	BRA	Márcio Griggio
—	MF	BRA	Ranielli
—	MF	BRA	Sérgio Manoel
—	MF	BRA	Sérgio Santos
—	MF	BRA	Zé Renato
—	FW	BRA	Almir
—	FW	BRA	Cilinho
—	FW	BRA	Guga
—	FW	BRA	Neizinho
—	FW	BRA	Neto

Source: Acervo Santista

=== Statistics ===
==== Appearances and goals ====
Pos.	Nat	Name	Brasileiro		Paulista		Supercopa		Rio–São Paulo		Total	
Pos.	Nat	Name	Apps	Goals	Apps	Goals	Apps	Goals	Apps	Goals	Apps	Goals
GK	(Brazil)	Gomes	0	0	7	0	0	0	3	0	10	0
GK	(Brazil)	Maurício	0	0	26 (1)	0	0	0	1	0	28	0
GK	(Brazil)	Nilton	0	0	3	0	0	0	0	0	3	0
GK	(Brazil)	Velloso	20	0	0	0	2	0	2	0	24	0
DF	(Brazil)	Camilo	0	0	0	0	0	0	5	0	5	0
DF	(Brazil)	Dinho	0	0	19 (7)	1	0	0	6	0	32	1
DF	(Brazil)	Eduardo	8	0	0	0	2	0	0	0	10	0
DF	(Brazil)	Flavinho	0	0	2	0	0	0	0	0	2	0
DF	(Brazil)	Índio	19	0	18 (3)	2	2	0	6	1	48	3
DF	(Brazil)	Itá	0	0	4	0	0	0	0	0	4	0
DF	(Brazil)	Júnior	16	2	33	0	2	0	6	0	57	2
DF	(Brazil)	Luiz Carlos	0	0	9	0	0	0	0	0	9	0
DF	(Brazil)	Lula	6 (3)	0	0	0	0	0	0	0	9	0
DF	(Brazil)	Marcelo Fernandes	3 (2)	0	0	0	0 (1)	0	0	0	6	0
DF	(Brazil)	Marcos Paulo	1	0	0	0	0	0	0	0	1	0
DF	(Brazil)	Maurício Copertino	0 (1)	0	3 (1)	0	0	0	1 (2)	0	8	0
DF	(Brazil)	Ricardo Rocha	15	0	0	0	2	0	0	0	17	0
DF	(Brazil)	Rogerio	0	0	17 (6)	0	0	0	2	0	25	0
DF	(Brazil)	Silva	7 (2)	0	29	1	0	0	0 (2)	0	40	1
DF	(Brazil)	Vilson	0	0	9 (1)	0	0	0	1	0	11	0
MF	(Brazil)	Axel	13	1	18	1	2	0	0	0	33	2
MF	(Brazil)	Cuca	7 (2)	2	26 (1)	9	0	0	3	0	39	11
MF	(Brazil)	Darci	18 (1)	2	31	2	2	0	5	3	57	7
MF	(Brazil)	Essinho	0	0	0	0	0	0	0 (1)	0	1	0
MF	(Brazil)	Gallo	13 (1)	2	24 (2)	3	1	0	1	0	42	5
MF	(Brazil)	Marcelo Passos	0 (1)	0	12 (4)	3	0	0	0 (2)	0	19	3
MF	(Brazil)	Márcio Griggio	13 (3)	0	0	0	2	0	2 (1)	1	21	1
MF	(Brazil)	Ranielli	7 (3)	2	20 (8)	9	0	0	5 (1)	1	44	12
MF	(Brazil)	Serginho Fraldinha	0	0	2 (6)	1	0	0	0	0	8	1
MF	(Brazil)	Sérgio Manoel	15	2	0	0	1 (1)	0	0	0	17	2
MF	(Brazil)	Sérgio Santos	1 (1)	0	0	0	0	0	4	0	6	0
MF	(Brazil)	Zé Renato	6 (1)	2	3 (3)	1	0	0	2 (1)	1	16	4
FW	(Brazil)	Almir	15	4	30	6	2	0	0	0	47	10
FW	(Brazil)	Cilinho	0	0	24 (2)	5	0	0	4	0	30	5
FW	(Brazil)	Guga	15 (2)	14	18 (3)	15	1 (1)	0	0	0	40	29
FW	(Brazil)	Neizinho	2 (14)	2	9 (9)	6	1	0	6	3	41	11
FW	(Brazil)	Neto	0	0	0	0	0	0	1 (1)	0	2	0
FW	(Brazil)	Toni	0 (1)	0	0	0	0	0	0	0	1	0

Source: Match reports in Competitive matches

==== Goalscorers ====
Ran	Pos	Nat	Name	Brasileiro	Paulistão	Supercopa	Rio–São Paulo	Total
1	FW	(Brazil)	Guga	14	15	0	0	29
2	MF	(Brazil)	Ranielli	2	9	0	1	12
3	MF	(Brazil)	Cuca	2	9	0	0	11
3	FW	(Brazil)	Neizinho	2	6	0	3	11
4	FW	(Brazil)	Almir	4	6	0	0	10
5	MF	(Brazil)	Darci	2	2	0	3	7
6	FW	(Brazil)	Cilinho	0	5	0	0	5
6	MF	(Brazil)	Gallo	2	3	0	0	5
7	MF	(Brazil)	Zé Renato	2	1	0	1	4
8	DF	(Brazil)	Índio	0	2	0	1	3
8	MF	(Brazil)	Marcelo Passos	0	3	0	0	3
9	MF	(Brazil)	Axel	1	1	0	0	2
9	DF	(Brazil)	Júnior	2	0	0	0	2
9	MF	(Brazil)	Sérgio Manoel	2	0	0	0	2
10	DF	(Brazil)	Dinho	0	1	0	0	1
10	MF	(Brazil)	Márcio Griggio	0	0	0	1	1
10	MF	(Brazil)	Serginho Fraldinha	0	1	0	0	1
10	DF	(Brazil)	Silva	0	1	0	0	1

Source: Match reports in Competitive matches

== Transfers ==
=== In ===
Pos.	Name	Moving from	Source	Notes
LB	(Brazil) Marcelo Veiga	Internacional		Loan return
DF	(Brazil) Maurício Copertino	Oeste		Loan return
MF	(Brazil) Sérgio Santos	Rio Branco–SP		Loan return
FW	(Brazil) Whelliton	América de Morrinhos		Loan return
FW	(Brazil) Loca	Mineiro		Loan return
FW	(Brazil) Toninho Marques	Ferroviária		Loan return
MF	(Brazil) Cassinho	União Barbarense		Loan return
LB	(Brazil) Silva	São Bento		
MF	(Brazil) Essinho	Itumbiara		Loan return
GK	(Brazil) Maurício	Novorizontino		On loan
MF	(Brazil) Darci	Rio Branco–SP		On loan
MF	(Brazil) Zé Renato	Botafogo–SP		Loan return
MF	(Brazil) Cuca	Palmeiras		
FW	(Brazil) Neizinho	São Bento		On loan
DF	(Brazil) Vilson	Grêmio		On loan
GK	(Brazil) Gomes	Grêmio		On loan
LB	(Brazil) Itá	Al Shabab (Saudi Arabia)		
MF	(Brazil) Márcio Griggio	Juventus		On loan
FW	(Brazil) Neto	Juventus		On loan
DF	(Brazil) Camilo	Rio Branco–SP		Loan return
GK	(Brazil) Velloso	Palmeiras		On loan
MF	(Brazil) Sérgio Santos	São Bento		Loan return
LB	(Brazil) Eduardo	Grêmio		
DF	(Brazil) Ricardo Rocha	Real Madrid (Spain)		
FW	(Brazil) Neizinho	São Bento		
MF	(Brazil) Sérgio Manoel	Fluminense		Loan return
DF	(Brazil) Marcelo Fernandes	Remo		Loan return
DF	(Brazil) Lula	São Paulo		
FW	(Brazil) Toni	Real Valladolid (Spain)		
LB	(Brazil) Marcos Paulo	Youth system		Promoted

=== Out ===
Pos.	Name	Moving to	Source	Notes
RB	(Brazil) Jairo Fernando	Internacional		Loan return
LB	(Brazil) Alexandre	Brasil de Farroupilha		Loan return
MF	(Brazil) Edu Marangon	Free agent		Loan return
FW	(Brazil) Edmar	Free agent		Loan return
FW	(Brazil) Luizinho	São Bento		
MF	(Brazil) Sérgio Santos	São Bento		On loan
DF	(Brazil) França	São Bento		On loan
FW	(Brazil) Moysés	São Bento		On loan
FW	(Brazil) Loca	Goiás		On loan
MF	(Brazil) Essinho	Goiás		On loan
MF	(Brazil) Cerezo	Goiás		On loan
DF	(Brazil) Camilo	Rio Branco–SP		On loan
DF	(Brazil) Marcelo Fernandes	Rio Branco–SP		On loan
MF	(Brazil) Sérgio Manoel	Fluminense		On loan
DF	(Brazil) Nei	Ponte Preta		
LB	(Brazil) Marcelo Veiga	Free agent		
GK	(Brazil) Sérgio Guedes	Goiás		
GK	(Brazil) Edinho	Portuguesa Santista		On loan
LB	(Brazil) Flavinho	Bahia		On loan
DF	(Brazil) Marcelo Fernandes	Remo		On loan
DF	(Brazil) França	CRB		On loan
MF	(Brazil) Cerezo	CRB		On loan
DF	(Brazil) Luiz Carlos	Goiás		On loan
LB	(Brazil) Itá	Grêmio		
FW	(Brazil) Whelliton	Goiatuba		On loan
MF	(Brazil) Serginho Fraldinha	Confiança		On loan
DF	(Brazil) Rogerio	Inter de Limeira		On loan
DF	(Brazil) Camilo	Inter de Limeira		On loan
GK	(Brazil) Edinho	São Caetano		On loan
DF	(Brazil) Dinho	Inter de Limeira		On loan
MF	(Brazil) Marcelo Passos	Inter de Limeira		On loan
MF	(Brazil) Cerezo	Jabaquara		On loan

== Friendlies ==
1 July Friendly	VOCEM	0 – 1	Santos	Assis
		Report	43' Vilson	Stadium: Tonicão; Referee: Osvaldo dos Santos Ramos

14 August Friendly	Guangzhou (China)	1 – 2	Santos	Guangzhou, China
	Huang Qineng 57'	Report	82' Cuca; 89' Guga	Attendance: 24,000

16 August Friendly	Sichuan football team (China)	0 – 4	Santos	Chengdu, China
		Report	6' Neizinho; 32', 37' Cuca; 82' Zé Renato	Stadium: Chengdu Sports Centre; Attendance: 27,000; Referee: Gao Fang Wen

18 August Friendly	August First (China)	0 – 1	Santos	Chengdu, China
		Report	67' Cuca	Stadium: Chengdu Sports Centre; Attendance: 15,000; Referee: Gao Fang Wen

22 August Friendly	Beijing football team (China)	0 – 2	Santos	Beijing, China
		Report	61' Cuca; 83' Ranielli	Stadium: Workers' Stadium

25 August Friendly	Shanghai football team (China)	1 – 1	Santos	Shanghai, China
	Liu Jun 45'	Report	25' Zé Renato	Stadium: Hongkou Football Stadium; Attendance: 20,000; Referee: Zhang Ye Duan

28 August Friendly	China U23	0 – 1	Santos	Nanjing, China
		Report	15' Márcio Griggio	Stadium: Wutaishan Stadium; Attendance: 30,000; Referee: Zhang Ye Duan

== Competitions ==
=== Campeonato Brasileiro ===
==== Results summary ====
Overall								Home						Away					
Pld	W	D	L	GF	GA	GAv	Pts	W	D	L	GF	GA	Pts	W	D	L	GF	GA	Pts
20	9	7	4	35	26	1.346	25	5	3	2	19	13	13	4	4	2	16	13	12

==== First stage ====
Pos	Team	Pld	W	D	L	GF	GA	GD	Pts	Qualification
1	Palmeiras	14	10	2	2	27	14	+13	22	Qualified to second phase
2	Santos	14	8	4	2	24	14	+10	20	Qualified to second phase
3	Guarani	14	7	5	2	21	13	+8	19	Qualified to second phase
4	Grêmio	14	6	3	5	20	17	+3	15	
5	Vasco da Gama	14	5	3	6	19	20	−1	13	

===== Matches =====
7 September 1	Sport Recife	0 – 2	Santos	Recife
16:00		Report	32' Zé Renato; 70' Almir	Stadium: Ilha do Retiro; Attendance: 9,640; Referee: Sidrack Marinho dos Santos

11 September 2	Atlético Mineiro	1 – 1	Santos	Belo Horizonte
16:00	Valdir Benedito 17'	Report	30' Darci	Stadium: Mineirão; Attendance: 11,211; Referee: Cláudio Vinícius Cerdeira

18 September 3	Santos	0 – 2	Fluminense	Santos
16:00		Report	54' Chiquinho; 58' Nílson	Stadium: Vila Belmiro; Attendance: 10,088; Referee: Márcio Rezende de Freitas

22 September 4	Guarani	2 – 1	Santos	Campinas
21:40	Clóvis 29', 47'	Report	65' Guga	Stadium: Brinco de Ouro; Attendance: 3,097; Referee: Silas Santana

26 September 5	Santos	3 – 1	Palmeiras	Santos
16:00	Sérgio Manoel 32'; Ranielli 72'; Almir 89'	Report	2' Roberto Carlos	Stadium: Vila Belmiro; Attendance: 11,703; Referee: Flávio de Carvalho

29 September 6	Grêmio	0 – 1	Santos	Porto Alegre
20:40		Report	85' (pen.) Darci	Stadium: Olímpico; Attendance: 23,304; Referee: Léo Feldman

2 October 7	Santos	1 – 1	Vasco da Gama	Santos
16:00	Neizinho 58'	Report	3' Valdir Bigode	Stadium: Vila Belmiro; Attendance: 12,049; Referee: Renato Marsiglia

9 October 8	Santos	3 – 0	Sport Recife	Santos
16:00	Guga 63', 64', 77' (pen.)	Report		Stadium: Vila Belmiro; Attendance: 7,512; Referee: Antônio Pereira da Silva

18 October 9	Santos	1 – 0	Atlético Mineiro	Santos
21:30	Cuca 20'	Report		Stadium: Vila Belmiro; Attendance: 6,478; Referee: Wilson de Souza Mendonça

24 October 10	Santos	3 – 3	Guarani	Santos
17:00	Guga 22', 24'; Zé Renato 88'	Report	6' Robert; 14' Fernando; 70' Clóvis	Stadium: Vila Belmiro; Attendance: 10,016; Referee: Silas Santana

31 October 11	Fluminense	3 – 4	Santos	Rio de Janeiro
17:00	Nílson 9', 38'; Andrei 62'	Report	11', 46' Guga; 52' Axel; 53' Sérgio Manoel	Stadium: Laranjeiras; Attendance: 2,093; Referee: José Moccelin

7 November 12	Santos	2 – 0	Grêmio	Santos
17:00	Júnior 21'; Gallo 40'	Report		Stadium: Vila Belmiro; Attendance: 17,769; Referee: Márcio Rezende de Freitas

11 November 13	Palmeiras	0 – 1	Santos	São Paulo
21:40		Report	57' Guga	Stadium: Parque Antártica; Attendance: 31,951; Referee: Marcos Fábio Spironelli

15 November 14	Vasco da Gama	1 – 1	Santos	Rio de Janeiro
17:00	Júnior 49'	Report	23' Guga	Stadium: Maracanã; Attendance: 788; Referee: Cláudio Vinícius Cerdeira

==== Second stage ====
Pos	Team	Pld	W	D	L	GF	GA	GD	Pts	Qualification
1	Vitória	6	2	4	0	11	9	+2	8	Qualified for the final
2	Corinthians	6	2	3	1	11	10	+1	7	
3	Santos	6	1	3	2	11	12	−1	5	
4	Flamengo	6	0	4	2	6	8	−2	4	

===== Matches =====
20 November 1	Corinthians	3 – 2	Santos	São Paulo
16:00	Rivaldo 50'; Válber 55' (pen.); Zé Elias 64'	Report	66' Gallo; 72' Guga	Stadium: Morumbi; Attendance: 45,970; Referee: Oscar Roberto de Godói

26 November 2	Flamengo	1 – 1	Santos	Rio de Janeiro
21:35	Rogério 66'	Report	79' Neizinho	Stadium: Maracanã; Attendance: 4,346; Referee: Dalmo Bozzano

28 November 3	Santos	3 – 3	Vitória	São Paulo
17:00	Júnior 57'; Guga 76', 83'	Report	17' Paulo Isidoro; 61' Roberto Cavalo; 67' Pichetti	Stadium: Parque Antártica; Attendance: 16,325; Referee: Renato Marsiglia

1 December 4	Vitória	2 – 2	Santos	Salvador
21:35	Paulo Isidoro 2', 16'	Report	17' Guga; 45' Cuca	Stadium: Fonte Nova; Attendance: 42,115; Referee: Márcio Rezende de Freitas

4 December 5	Santos	2 – 1	Flamengo	São Paulo
16:00	Ranielli 22'; Almir 30'	Report	61' (o.g.) Lula	Stadium: Parque Antártica; Attendance: 8,155; Referee: José Moccelin

8 December 6	Santos	1 – 2	Corinthians	São Paulo
21:35	Almir 54'	Report	85' Rivaldo; 88' Viola	Stadium: Morumbi; Attendance: 14,538; Referee: João Paulo Araújo

=== Campeonato Paulista ===
==== Results summary ====
Overall								Home						Away					
Pld	W	D	L	GF	GA	GAv	Pts	W	D	L	GF	GA	Pts	W	D	L	GF	GA	Pts
36	18	8	10	65	56	1.161	44	12	2	4	41	28	26	6	6	6	24	28	18

==== First stage ====
Pos	Team	Pld	W	D	L	GF	GA	GD	Pts	Qualification or relegation
2	São Paulo	30	16	7	7	53	24	+29	39	Qualified
3	Corinthians	30	16	7	7	59	34	+25	39	Qualified
4	Santos	30	16	7	7	55	41	+14	39	Qualified
5	Guarani	30	15	6	9	41	41	0	36	Qualified
6	Rio Branco	30	13	10	7	43	32	+11	36	Qualified

Updated to match(es) played on 9 May 1993. Source: RSSSF.com
Rules for classification: 1) points; 2) wins; 3) goal difference; 4) number of goals scored.

===== Matches =====
23 January 1	Santos	4 – 2	Portuguesa	Santos
17:00	Almir 16'; Marcelo Passos 45'; Cilinho 54'; Cuca 73'	Report	53' Bentinho; 83' (o.g.) Axel	Stadium: Vila Belmiro; Attendance: 9,997; Referee: José Aparecido de Oliveira

26 January 2	Santos	2 – 0	Noroeste	Santos
17:00	Ranielli 49'; Cuca 85'	Report		Stadium: Vila Belmiro; Attendance: 7,120; Referee: Ulysses Tavares da Silva

31 January 3	Corinthians	0 – 1	Santos	São Paulo
16:00		Report	58' Guga	Stadium: Morumbi; Attendance: 15,676; Referee: Dionísio Roberto Domingos

3 February 4	Santos	2 – 1	Guarani	Santos
21:30	Cuca 10'; Ranielli 69'	Report	58' André Beraldo	Stadium: Vila Belmiro; Attendance: 8,562; Referee: Flávio de Carvalho

7 February 5	Santos	1 – 3	Palmeiras	São Paulo
17:00	Cilinho 62'	Report	1' Zinho; 19' Edmundo; 48' Evair	Stadium: Morumbi; Attendance: 39,245; Referee: Oscar Roberto de Godói

10 February 6	Juventus	1 – 2	Santos	São Paulo
20:30	Márcio Griggio 84'	Report	62' Guga; 87' Almir	Stadium: Pacaembu; Attendance: 5,134; Referee: Edmundo Lima Filho

13 February 7	Santos	4 – 2	Marília	Santos
16:00	Guga 13' (pen.), 68'; Cilinho 27'; Cuca 86'	Report	44' (pen.) Vitor Hugo; 69' Guilherme	Stadium: Vila Belmiro; Attendance: 9,374; Referee: Dagoberto Teixeira

17 February 8	Ponte Preta	0 – 0	Santos	Campinas
21:15		Report		Stadium: Moisés Lucarelli; Attendance: 4,307; Referee: Silas Santana

20 February 9	Ituano	1 – 4	Santos	Itu
16:00	Márcio Flores 84'	Report	16', 59', 71' Guga; 85' Cuca	Stadium: Novelli Júnior; Attendance: 5,388; Referee: Antônio de Pádua Salles

28 February 10	XV de Piracicaba	1 – 1	Santos	Piracicaba
16:00	Fabinho 27'	Report	79' Cuca	Stadium: Barão da Serra Negra; Attendance: 12,842; Referee: Ulisses Tavares da Silva

3 March 11	Santos	2 – 2	Mogi Mirim	Santos
20:40	Silva 6'; Zé Renato 78'	Report	66' Sandro Gaúcho; 68' (pen.) Válber	Stadium: Vila Belmiro; Attendance: 6,766; Referee: João Paulo Araújo

7 March 12	São Paulo	1 – 0	Santos	São Paulo
16:00	Cafu 56'	Report		Stadium: Morumbi; Attendance: 39,965; Referee: Márcio Rezende de Freitas

11 March 13	Rio Branco	2 – 2	Santos	Americana
20:40	Gilson Batata 67' (pen.); Camilo 81'	Report	25' Cuca; 30' Marcelo Passos	Stadium: Décio Vitta; Attendance: 15,379; Referee: José Aparecido de Oliveira

14 March 14	Santos	2 – 0	Bragantino	Santos
16:00	Axel 74'; Neizinho 78'	Report		Stadium: Vila Belmiro; Attendance: 13,042; Referee: Silas Santana

18 March 15	União São João	0 – 0	Santos	Araras
21:00		Report		Stadium: Hermínio Ometto; Attendance: 5,041; Referee: Dionísio Domingos

21 March 16	Santos	2 – 5	Corinthians	São Paulo
16:00	Neizinho 48', 51'	Report	21' Moacir; 29' Paulo Sérgio; 55' Neto; 66' Adil; 82' Viola	Stadium: Morumbi; Attendance: 52,028; Referee: Oscar Roberto de Godói

24 March 17	Guarani	1 – 2	Santos	Campinas
20:40	Rocha 43'	Report	57' Dinho; 62' Neizinho	Stadium: Brinco de Ouro; Attendance: 4,513; Referee: Dagoberto Teixeira

28 March 18	Mogi Mirim	1 – 0	Santos	Mogi Mirim
16:00	Rivaldo 81'	Report		Stadium: Wilson de Barros; Attendance: 7,821; Referee: Márcio Rezende de Freitas

1 April 19	Santos	2 – 1	Rio Branco	Santos
21:00	Guga 40', 84' (pen.)	Report	36' Gilson Batata	Stadium: Vila Belmiro; Attendance: 8,793; Referee: Edmundo Lima Filho

3 April 20	Palmeiras	2 – 1	Santos	São Paulo
16:00	Evair 58'; Edílson 87'	Report	27' Guga	Stadium: Morumbi; Attendance: 36,269; Referee: João Paulo Araújo

7 April 21	Marília	3 – 1	Santos	Marília
20:40	Catatau 7'; Ney Bala 43'; Vladimir 90+1'	Report	29' Ranielli	Stadium: Bento de Abreu; Attendance: 8,614; Referee: Flávio de Carvalho

11 April 22	Santos	2 – 1	Juventus	Santos
16:00	Índio 48'; Guga 56'	Report	88' Élcio	Stadium: Vila Belmiro; Attendance: 7,879; Referee: Joaquim Carlos Caetano

15 April 23	Noroeste	2 – 3	Santos	Bauru
20:50	Luís Cláudio 19'; Jorge Rauli 72'	Report	4' Índio; 23' Guga; 41' Almir	Stadium: Alfredo de Castilho; Attendance: 3,561; Referee: Elzon José Régis Filho

18 April 24	Santos	2 – 1	XV de Piracicaba	Santos
16:00	Cilinho 53'; Almir 55'	Report	67' Jorge Batata	Stadium: Vila Belmiro; Attendance: 11,972; Referee: Flávio de Carvalho

22 April 25	Bragantino	1 – 1	Santos	Bragança Paulista
20:30	Ludo 11'	Report	90+2' Gallo	Stadium: Marcelo Stéfani; Attendance: 2,567; Referee: José Aparecido de Oliveira

25 April 26	Santos	1 – 0	São Paulo	Santos
17:00	Ranielli 83'	Report		Stadium: Vila Belmiro; Attendance: 19,000; Referee: João Paulo Araújo

28 April 27	Santos	3 – 1	União São João	Santos
20:40	Ranielli 3'; Cilinho 21'; Neizinho 65'	Report	60' Israel	Stadium: Vila Belmiro; Attendance: 8,475; Referee: Oscar Roberto de Godói

1 May 28	Portuguesa	4 – 2	Santos	São Paulo
16:00	Bentinho 62', 64'; Tico 74'; Dener 81'	Report	24' Neizinho; 56' Ranielli	Stadium: Canindé; Attendance: 19,375; Referee: Joaquim Carlos Caetano

5 May 29	Santos	1 – 1	Ponte Preta	Santos
20:30	Gallo 35'	Report	62' Nei Júnior	Stadium: Vila Belmiro; Attendance: 4,782; Referee: Dionísio Roberto Domingos

9 May 30	Santos	5 – 1	Ituano	Santos
17:00	Gallo 26'; Marcelo Passos 67'; Serginho Fraldinha 71'; Guga 80', 90+1'	Report	15' Juninho Paulista	Stadium: Vila Belmiro; Attendance: 4,841; Referee: Roberto Perassi

==== Second stage ====
Pos	Team	Pld	W	D	L	GF	GA	GD	Pts	Qualification or relegation
1	Corinthians	6	4	1	1	8	3	+5	9	Qualified
2	São Paulo	6	4	0	2	14	6	+8	8	
3	Santos	6	2	1	3	10	15	−5	5	
4	Novorizontino	6	1	0	5	6	14	−8	2	

Updated to match(es) played on 3 June 1993. Source: RSSSF.com
Rules for classification: 1) points; 2) wins; 3) goal difference; 4) number of goals scored.

===== Matches =====
16 May 1	Santos	1 – 2	Corinthians	São Paulo
16:00	Ranielli 23'	Report	65' Neto; 82' Ezequiel	Stadium: Morumbi; Attendance: 51,621; Referee: Ulisses Tavares da Silva Filho

21 May 2	Santos	3 – 2	São Paulo	São Paulo
20:30	Ranielli 34'; Almir 49'; Cuca 66'	Report	56' Raí; 75' Catê	Stadium: Pacaembu; Attendance: 20,203; Referee: Flávio de Carvalho

23 May 3	Novorizontino	2 – 3	Santos	Novo Horizonte
16:00	Sinval 19' (pen.); Rogério 71' (o.g.)	Report	3' Ranielli; 11' Almir; 31' (pen.) Darci	Stadium: Jorge Ismael de Biasi; Attendance: 14,105; Referee: Dagoberto Teixeira

27 May 4	Corinthians	0 – 0	Santos	São Paulo
21:00		Report		Stadium: Morumbi; Attendance: 28,420; Referee: Oscar Roberto de Godói

30 May 5	Santos	2 – 3	Novorizontino	Santos
16:00	Darci 14'; Cuca 40'	Report	22' Sinval; 55' Flávio; 67' Fernando	Stadium: Vila Belmiro; Attendance: 15,003; Referee: João Paulo Araújo

3 June 6	São Paulo	6 – 1	Santos	São Paulo
21:40	Palhinha 23', 58', 73'; Cafu 28'; Pintado 37'; Raí 80'	Report	56' Guga	Stadium: Morumbi; Attendance: 15,702; Referee: Oscar Roberto de Godói

=== Supercopa Libertadores ===
==== Round of 16 ====
5 October First leg	Santos (Brazil)	0 – 0	(Colombia) Atlético Nacional	Santos
21:40		Report		Stadium: Vila Belmiro; Attendance: 4,332; Referee: José Luiz da Rosa (Uruguay)

13 October Second leg	Atlético Nacional (Colombia)	1 – 0 (1–0 agg.)	(Brazil) Santos	Medellín, Colombia
22:45	Tréllez 30'	Report		Stadium: Atanasio Girardot; Attendance: 32,000; Referee: Alfredo Rosas (Ecuador)

=== Torneiro Rio-São Paulo ===
==== Group stage ====
Pos	Team	Pld	W	D	L	GF	GA	GD	Pts	Qualification
1	Palmeiras	6	3	1	2	10	6	+4	7	Qualified for the final
2	Santos	6	3	1	2	10	11	−1	7	
3	Flamengo	6	2	2	2	13	10	+3	6	
4	Fluminense	6	1	2	3	6	12	−6	4	

Updated to match(es) played on 29 July 1993. Source:

===== Matches =====
26 June 1	Santos	3 – 1	Fluminense	Santos
16:00	Darci 58'; Ranielli 70'; Índio 90'	Report	7' Lira	Stadium: Vila Belmiro; Attendance: 3,479; Referee: Edmundo Lima Filho

7 July 2	Santos	2 – 0	Palmeiras	Santos
20:30	Darci 7' (pen.); Neizinho 55'	Report		Stadium: Vila Belmiro; Attendance: 7,233; Referee: Dionísio Roberto Domingos

10 July 3	Flamengo	3 – 0	Santos	Niterói
16:00	Renato Gaúcho 19'; Marcelinho Carioca 85'; Luís Antônio 87'	Report		Stadium: Caio Martins; Attendance: 2,799; Referee: Aloísio de Oliveira Viug

17 July 4	Palmeiras	3 – 0	Santos	São Paulo
16:00	Edílson 13'; Paulo Sérgio 64'; Jean Carlo 73'	Report		Stadium: Parque Antártica; Attendance: 9,402; Referee: Flávio de Carvalho

21 July 5	Fluminense	1 – 1	Santos	Rio de Janeiro
20:30	Márcio Baby 45'	Report	60' Zé Renato	Stadium: Laranjeiras; Attendance: 643; Referee: Reinaldo Barros

27 July 6	Santos	4 – 3	Flamengo	Santos
16:00	Márcio Griggio 4'; Darci 62' (pen.); Neizinho 71', 77'	Report	81' Paulo Nunes; 86', 88' Renato Gaúcho	Stadium: Vila Belmiro; Attendance: 10,160; Referee: José Aparecido de Oliveira
