= Marcelo Fernandes =

Brazilian footballer

Personal information
- Full name: Marcelo Faria Fernandes
- Date of birth: 20 April 1971 (age 55)
- Place of birth: Santos, Brazil
- Height: 1.89 m (6 ft 2 in)
- Position: Centre-back

Senior career*
Years	Team	Apps	(Gls)
1990	Portuguesa Santista	12	(0)
1991–1998	Santos	63	(4)
1993	→ Rio Branco-SP (loan)	22	(1)
1993	→ Remo (loan)	30	(2)
1996	→ Botafogo-SP (loan)	6	(0)
1997	→ América de Natal (loan)	14	(0)
1998	→ Atlético Mineiro (loan)	4	(0)
1999	Portuguesa Santista	16	(1)
1999	América de Natal	1	(0)
2000	Criciúma	14	(1)
2000–2001	Joinville	10	(0)
2001	Náutico	6	(1)
2002–2003	Portuguesa	61	(2)
2003	ABC	21	(3)

Managerial career
- 2011–2015: Santos (assistant)
- 2015: Santos (interim)
- 2015: Santos
- 2015–2017: Santos (assistant)
- 2017: Portuguesa Santista
- 2017: Santos (assistant)
- 2019–2020: Corinthians U23 (assistant)
- 2020–2022: Santos (assistant)
- 2020: Santos (interim)
- 2021: Santos (interim)
- 2021: Santos (interim)
- 2022: Santos (interim)
- 2022: Santos (interim)
- 2023–2024: Santos (assistant)
- 2023: Santos (interim)
- 2025: Guarani
- 2025–2026: Ponte Preta
- 2026: Botafogo-PB
- * Club domestic league appearances and goals

Marcelo Faria Fernandes (Brazilian Portuguese: [maʁˈsɛlu feʁˈnɐ̃dʒis]; born 20 April 1974) is a Brazilian football coach and former player who played as a centre-back.

== Playing career ==
Born in Santos, São Paulo, Fernandes played amateur football until his 20s, and began his career at Portuguesa Santista. He moved to Santos in 1991, but after failing to break into the club's starting XI, was loaned to Rio Branco de Americana, Remo, Botafogo-SP, América de Natal and Atlético Mineiro, the last one already in 1998.

Fernandes was released by Peixe in 1999, and returned to Portuguesa Santista. He subsequently returned to América-RN, and then played for Criciúma, Joinville, Náutico, Portuguesa and ABC, retiring with the latter in 2003, aged 32.

== Post-playing career ==
In 2011 Fernandes joined former club Santos' staff, being appointed as assistant manager. On 5 March 2015, after Enderson Moreira's dismissal, he was named interim manager.

On 12 March, after a 2–1 home win against rivals Palmeiras, Fernandes was definitely appointed as manager. On 9 July, after only winning three out of 30 points, he returned to his previous assistant role, being replaced by Dorival Júnior.

In September 2016, after altercations with Dorival, Fernandes was separated from Santos' first team squad. He was also manager of Portuguesa Santista in 2017, after the club reached an agreement with Santos for the loan of certain players, but returned to the club in June of that year.

Fernandes left Peixe in the end of 2017, being subsequently Edson Leivinha's assistant at Corinthians' under-23 squad. In October 2020, he returned to Santos as a permanent assistant coach.

In November 2020, after manager Cuca and other assistants Cuquinha and Eudes Pedro all tested positive for COVID-19, Fernandes was again interim of the main squad. He was an interim in February 2021 after Cuca left, in April 2021 after Ariel Holan resigned, in February 2022 after Fábio Carille was sacked, and in July 2022 after Fabián Bustos was dismissed.

On 27 July 2022, Fernandes left Santos on a mutual agreement. On 6 August of the following year, he returned to the club under the same role, and became an interim head coach for the sixth time in three years on 15 September 2023, after the dismissal of Diego Aguirre.

Despite improving Santos' form in the first matches, Fernandes was unable to avoid the club's first-ever relegation to the Série B, after a 2–1 home loss to Fortaleza in the last round. Back to the assistant role for the 2024 season, he was dismissed from the club on 3 January 2025.

On 30 April 2025, Fernandes was announced as head coach of Série C side Guarani. He led the club out of the relegation zone, but was sacked on 26 July, after a four-match winless run, and took over cross-town rivals Ponte Preta in the same division on 12 August.

Fernandes led Ponte to their first-ever national title, winning the 2025 Série C, but left by mutual consent on 15 February 2026, after suffering relegation from the 2026 Campeonato Paulista. On 28 April, he replaced Lisca at the helm of Botafogo-PB back in the third division.

Fernandes was sacked by Belo on 26 September 2026, after four winless matches in the second stage.

== Career statistics ==
Club	Season	League			State League		Cup		Continental		Other		Total	
Club	Season	Division	Apps	Goals	Apps	Goals	Apps	Goals	Apps	Goals	Apps	Goals	Apps	Goals
Santos	1991	Série A	—		2	0	—		—		—		2	0
Santos	1992	Série A	9	0	2	1	—		—		—		11	1
Santos	1993	Série A	5	0	—		—		—		1 (Note: Appearance(s) in Supercopa Libertadores)	0	6	0
Santos	1994	Série A	14	2	17	1	—		—		4 (Note: Two appearances in Supercopa Libertadores, two appearances in Copa Bandeirantes)	0	35	3
Santos	1995	Série A	0	0	14	0	0	0	—		—		14	0
Santos	Total		28	2	35	2	0	0	—		5	0	68	4
Rio Branco-SP	1993	Paulista	—		22	1	—		—		—		22	1
América de Natal	1997	Série A	14	0	—		—		—		—		14	0
Atlético Mineiro	1998	Série A	0	0	4	0	3	0	—		—		7	0
Portuguesa Santista	1999	Paulista	—		16	1	—		—		—		16	1
Criciúma	2000	Série B	0	0	14	1	—		—		—		14	1
Career total			42	2	91	5	3	0	0	0	5	0	141	7

== Managerial statistics ==
As of 27 September 2026

Managerial record by team and tenure
Team	Nat	From	To	Record								Ref
Team	Nat	From	To	G	W	D	L	GF	GA	GD	Win %	Ref
Santos (interim)	(Brazil)	5 March 2015	12 March 2015	2	2	0	0	5	1	+4	100.00	
Santos	(Brazil)	12 March 2015	9 July 2015	27	11	7	9	38	35	+3	40.74	
Portuguesa Santista	(Brazil)	21 February 2017	5 May 2017	15	6	5	4	23	16	+7	40.00	
Santos (interim)	(Brazil)	10 November 2020	25 November 2020	3	2	0	1	4	2	+2	66.67	
Santos (interim)	(Brazil)	22 February 2021	3 March 2021	3	0	2	1	3	5	−2	0.00	
Santos (interim)	(Brazil)	26 April 2021	9 May 2021	5	2	1	2	10	6	+4	40.00	
Santos (interim)	(Brazil)	18 February 2022	27 February 2022	3	1	1	1	5	5	+0	33.33	
Santos (interim)	(Brazil)	7 July 2022	20 July 2022	4	3	0	1	4	1	+3	75.00	
Santos (interim)	(Brazil)	15 September 2023	7 December 2023	15	6	4	5	18	25	−7	40.00	
Guarani	(Brazil)	30 April 2025	26 July 2025	10	4	4	2	8	6	+2	40.00	
Ponte Preta	(Brazil)	12 August 2025	15 February 2026	19	8	3	8	16	18	−2	42.11	
Botafogo-PB	(Brazil)	28 April 2026	26 September 2026	19	8	4	7	23	19	+4	42.11	
Total				125	53	31	41	157	149	+8	42.40	—

== Honours ==
=== Player ===
Remo

- Campeonato Paraense: 1993

=== Manager ===
Santos

- Campeonato Paulista: 2015

Ponte Preta

- Campeonato Brasileiro Série C: 2025
