= Cuca (footballer, born 1963) =

Brazilian football manager (born 1963)

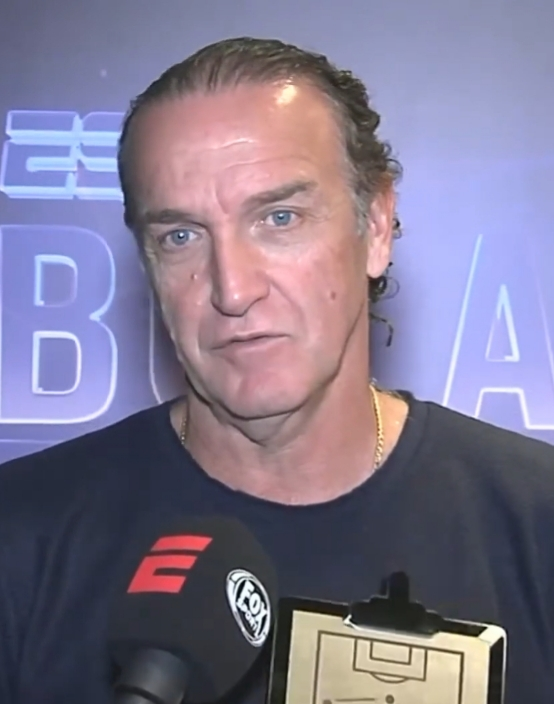
- Cuca in 2021

Personal information
- Full name: Alexi Stival
- Date of birth: 7 June 1963 (age 63)
- Place of birth: Curitiba, Brazil
- Height: 1.78 m (5 ft 10 in)
- Position: Forward

Team information
- Current team: Santos (head coach)

Youth career
- Pinheiros-PR

Senior career*
Years	Team	Apps	(Gls)
1981–1983	Pinheiros-PR	?	(2)
1984–1985	Santa Cruz-RS	24	(4)
1985–1987	Juventude	92	(22)
1987–1990	Grêmio	122	(51)
1990–1991	Valladolid	12	(4)
1991	→ Internacional (loan)	34	(8)
1992	Grêmio	9	(2)
1992	Palmeiras	18	(5)
1993–1994	Santos	38	(11)
1994	→ Portuguesa (loan)	13	(2)
1994	Remo	13	(2)
1995	Juventude	37	(9)
1996	Chapecoense	?	(2)

International career
1991	Brazil	1	(0)

Managerial career
- 1998: Uberlândia
- 1999: Brasil de Pelotas
- 1999: Avaí
- 2000: Inter de Limeira
- 2000: Avaí
- 2001: Inter de Lages
- 2001: Remo
- 2001–2002: Criciúma
- 2002: Gama
- 2003: Paraná
- 2003: Goiás
- 2004: São Paulo
- 2004: Grêmio
- 2005: Flamengo
- 2005: Coritiba
- 2005: São Caetano
- 2006–2007: Botafogo
- 2007–2008: Botafogo
- 2008: Santos
- 2008: Fluminense
- 2009: Flamengo
- 2009–2010: Fluminense
- 2010–2011: Cruzeiro
- 2011–2013: Atlético Mineiro
- 2013–2015: Shandong Luneng
- 2016: Palmeiras
- 2017: Palmeiras
- 2018: Santos
- 2019: São Paulo
- 2020–2021: Santos
- 2021: Atlético Mineiro
- 2022: Atlético Mineiro
- 2023: Corinthians
- 2024: Athletico Paranaense
- 2025: Atlético Mineiro
- 2026–: Santos
- * Club domestic league appearances and goals

Alexi Stival (born 7 June 1963), known as Cuca (Portuguese pronunciation: [kukɐ]), is a Brazilian professional football coach and former player. He is the current head coach of Santos.

Cuca played as a forward, winning Campeonato Gaúcho titles for Grêmio and Internacional, while also featuring for Palmeiras and Santos, among others. He made one appearance for the Brazil national team in 1991.

Since his retirement, Cuca has been the head coach of a number of clubs, mostly in his native country. He has led nine of the Big 12, winning the Campeonato Brasileiro Série A with Palmeiras in 2016 and Atlético Mineiro in 2021, and also lifting the 2013 Copa Libertadores with the latter.

== Personal life ==
Born in Curitiba, Paraná, Cuca started playing football to help cover the expenses of a heart surgery for his father Dirceu. His nickname Cuca was created by his older brother Amauri: their parents used to mock Amauri when the boy was fooling around by saying that the city's police officer, nicknamed Cucla, would catch him on the act; once the little brother arrived at home and was described as "very handsome" by their mother, Amauri, in an attempt to mock his brother, called him Cuca in a reference to the police officer Cucla, not knowing that his nickname had an L.

Cuca is married to Rejane since 1985, and has two daughters, Maiara and Natasha. He is a practising Roman Catholic. Cuca's younger brother Cuquinha was also a footballer; a midfielder, he only had a short career before starting to work as his assistant in 1999. Their elder brother, Amauri, was a central defender who also played professionally.

On 7 November 2020, while coaching Santos, Cuca tested positive for COVID-19, being immediately transferred to the Hospital Sírio-Libanês.

=== Rape claims and conviction ===
In 1987, while playing a tournament in Switzerland with Grêmio, Cuca and three other teammates (Eduardo Henrique Hamester, Henrique Arlindo Etges and Fernando Castoldi), were arrested for 28 days for allegedly raping a 13-year-old girl in a hotel room in Bern. Two of the players admitted to having sex with the girl, but claimed that the encounter was consensual and that they were unaware that she was underaged; Cuca and the other teammate denied participating. Forensic examination found traces of semen from Cuca and Eduardo on the girl's body, but no evidence of violence, and the four were released on bail and allowed to return to Brazil. Despite Cuca not being initially identified by the accuser as one of the offenders, he was convicted in absentia two years later by a Swiss court to 15 months imprisonment for "engaging in sexual act with a minor and coercion". The sentence was not served and expired in 2004.

In 2023, the girl's attorney, Willi Egloff, said in an interview that the accuser did identify Cuca as one of the offenders. On 28 December of that year, his sentence was voided by the Swiss judicial system without a new judgement, after the judge Bettina Boschler deemed that his case in 1989 led to an "unfair veredict", and the Public Ministry alleged prescription of the crime and suggested the annulment of the sentence.

== Playing career ==
=== Club ===
Cuca started his career with Santa Cruz-RS after graduating with hometown side Pinheiros. He moved to Juventude in May 1985, and was a regular starter for the club until his transfer to Grêmio in July 1987.

While at Grêmio, Cuca scored the decisive goal of the 1989 Copa do Brasil Final against Sport Recife. He moved abroad for the first time in his career in August 1990, spending six months at La Liga side Real Valladolid.

Upon returning to Brazil, Cuca joined Grêmio's fierce rivals Internacional on loan. After struggling with injuries, he featured regularly for Palmeiras and Santos.

Cuca was signed by Portuguesa ahead of the 1994 season on loan, but failed to impress. He subsequently represented Remo, Juventude and Chapecoense, retiring with the latter in 1996 at the age of 33.

=== International ===
Cuca played one game for the Brazilian national team on 27 February 1991, against Paraguay, at Morenão, Campo Grande.

== Coaching career ==
=== Early career ===
Shortly after retiring, Cuca started coaching Uberlândia in 1998. In the following year, he led Avaí to the final of the Campeonato Catarinense, but lost to Figueirense.

Cuca began the 2000 season in charge of Internacional de Limeira, before returning to Avaí in February. Replaced by Roberto Cavalo shortly after, and led Internacional de Lages to a fifth place in the 2001 Catarinense.

On 23 August 2001, Cuca returned to a club he represented as a player, Remo. After leaving the club in October, he immediately took over Criciúma, but only remained in charge of the side until May 2002.

On 16 May 2002, Cuca was named in charge of Gama. Despite only losing one match (to eventual Campeonato Brasiliense champions CFZ de Brasília), he left in July after discovering the club was looking for a new head coach for the Série A.

On 1 March 2003, Cuca was appointed Paraná head coach. He led the club to a good start in the 2003 Série A, winning three of the club's first six matches in the competition.

=== Goiás ===
On 26 May 2003, Cuca was appointed head coach of Goiás also in the top tier. He gained notoriety with the club after taking them in the last position and avoiding relegation by finishing ninth.

=== São Paulo ===
On 17 December 2003, Cuca was appointed head coach of São Paulo in the place of Roberto Rojas. He was dismissed the following 2 September, after being knocked out of the year's Copa Libertadores in the semifinals by Once Caldas and dropping to the seventh place in the league.

Despite being unable to repeat the same success achieved at Goiás, Cuca is often credited for helping to assemble a part of the squad which later won the 2005 FIFA Club World Cup, being the one to suggest the signings of Fabão, Danilo and Grafite, players who worked with him at Goiás and subsequently became regular starters at the Tricolor.

=== Grêmio ===
Eight days after leaving São Paulo, Cuca was named head coach of Grêmio, a club he notably represented as a player. He resigned from the club on 27 October, after three wins in 11 matches; his successor Cláudio Duarte was unable to avoid the club's first-ever relegation.

=== Flamengo ===
On 3 February 2005, Cuca replaced Júlio César Leal at the helm of Flamengo. He was dismissed on 15 April, after a 2–0 Copa do Brasil loss to Ceará and a 4–1 loss to Fluminense in the Taça Rio final.

=== Coritiba ===
On 6 May 2005, Cuca returned to his hometown and was appointed Coritiba head coach. He was sacked on 12 October, after three consecutive losses.

=== São Caetano ===
On 9 November 2005, Cuca appointed in charge of São Caetano, also in the first division. Despite losing his first match, he did not lose any of the remaining four matches of the year and managed to avoid relegation, but was still sacked on 13 December.

=== Botafogo ===
On 22 May 2006, Cuca was presented as the new Botafogo head coach. He resigned on 28 September 2007, but returned to the role on 7 October after the departure of Mário Sérgio.

Cuca resigned for a second time on 29 May 2008, after being eliminated from the 2008 Copa do Brasil on penalties.

=== Santos ===
On 2 June 2008, Cuca was appointed head coach of another club he represented as a player, Santos. He made his debut in charge of the club in a 1–0 away loss to Vitória six days later, and only won his first match in charge on 20 July, a 1–0 win over Sport Recife eight rounds later; in the previous round, after a loss to Figueirense, he initially resigned, but was later convinced to remain in the role.

Cuca had his resignation accepted by Peixe on 7 August 2008, after a 3–2 home loss to Atléico Mineiro which left the club seriously threatened with relegation.

=== Fluminense ===
Four days after leaving Santos, Cuca was confirmed as head coach of Fluminense, replacing Renato Gaúcho. He won his first two matches in charge, but later went on to enter a seven-winless run (which included a 2–1 to former side Santos) which led to his dismissal on 2 October 2008.

=== Flamengo return ===
On 12 December 2008, Cuca returned to Flamengo after being named head coach for the ensuing campaign. He won the 2009 Campeonato Carioca – his first title as head coach – by defeating Botafogo on penalties, but was relieved from his duties the following 23 July.

=== Fluminense return ===
Cuca returned to Flu on 1 September 2009, again in the place of Renato Gaúcho. Under a mathematical threat of relegation of 99%, he led the side to a run of 11 matches unbeaten in the league, which included six consecutive wins, and avoided relegation in the last round; the club also reached the 2009 Copa Sudamericana finals, but lost to LDU Quito.

On 19 April 2010, after being knocked out in the semifinals of the 2010 Campeonato Carioca, Cuca was sacked from Fluminense.

=== Cruzeiro ===
On 8 June 2010, Cuca was named head coach of Cruzeiro. He led the club to a second place in the league, two points shy of champions and former club Fluminense.

Cuca also won the 2011 Campeonato Mineiro with the club, defeating rivals Atlético Mineiro 3–2 on aggregate. On 19 June of that year, however, after a run of five winless matches, he left and was replaced by Joel Santana.

=== Atlético Mineiro ===
On 8 August 2011, Cuca was announced as new head coach of Cruzeiro's rivals Atlético Mineiro, replacing Dorival Júnior. He won the 2012 Campeonato Mineiro and also lifted the 2013 Copa Libertadores, the club's first-ever continental title.

On 18 December 2013, after a 3–1 defeat to Raja Casablanca in the 2013 FIFA Club World Cup semifinals, Cuca was dismissed.

=== Shandong Luneng ===
On 21 December 2013, just three days after being sacked by Galo, Cuca was appointed at the helm of Chinese Super League side Shandong Luneng. He announced his departure from the club on 6 December 2015, after winning the Chinese FA Cup and the Chinese FA Super Cup.

=== Palmeiras ===
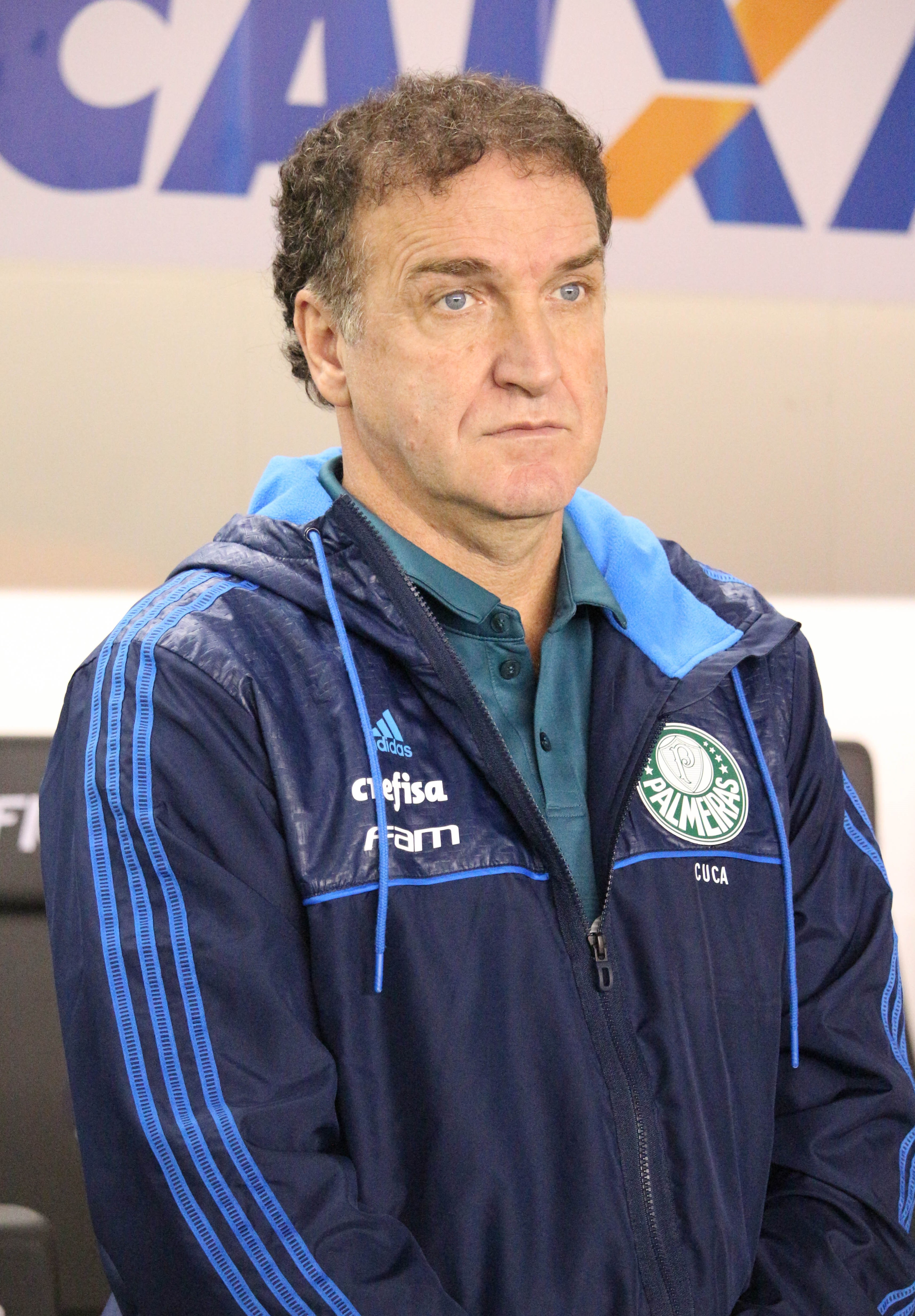
Cuca as head coach of Palmeiras in June 2017

On 14 March 2016, Cuca replaced Marcelo Oliveira at the helm of high-spending Palmeiras. He led the club to a Série A title after 22 years, but opted to resign on 30 November, alleging "personal reasons".

Cuca returned to Verdão on 5 May 2017, replacing fired Eduardo Baptista and signing a contract until the end of 2018. On 13 October, he was himself dismissed, with his assistant Alberto Valentim taking his place.

=== Santos return ===
On 30 July 2018, Cuca was appointed head coach of Santos for the second time. He took the club out of the relegation zone, but left after finishing in a disappointing tenth position due to a health problem.

=== São Paulo return ===
On 14 February 2019, Cuca agreed to a two-year contract with São Paulo, effective as of 15 April due to his heart condition. He resigned on 26 September, and was replaced by then coordinator Vagner Mancini.

=== Third spell at Santos ===
Cuca returned to Santos for a third spell on 7 August 2020. He led the club to the final of the 2020 Copa Libertadores, despite being under severe financial issues (also dealing with a transfer ban), but lost the title to rivals Palmeiras, being sent off late in the game.

On 3 February 2021, Cuca announced his departure from Santos at the end of the season when his contract expired, alleging 'mental exhaustion'. His departure was officially announced by the club on 21 February, after qualifying the club to the 2021 Libertadores.

=== Atlético Mineiro return ===
==== 2021 ====
On 5 March 2021, Cuca agreed to a two-year deal with Atlético Mineiro, returning to the club after seven years. He led the side to one of the most successful seasons in their history, winning the domestic treble and ending a 50-year streak since their last Campeonato Brasileiro title. He also equaled Levir Culpi's record as Atlético's most decorated head coach, with six titles.

On 28 December 2021, Cuca departed Galo for personal reasons.

==== 2022 ====
On 23 July 2022, Cuca returned to Atlético, signing a four-month contract. He left on a mutual agreement on 14 November, after only 21 matches.

=== Corinthians ===
On 20 April 2023, Cuca was announced as the new head coach of Corinthians, with a contract until the end of the year. Seven days later, however, he resigned from the role, citing personal reasons related to his sexual assault arrest in Switzerland in 1987. His hiring was almost immediately criticized by pundits, fans, and even the Corinthians women's team, citing the 1987 incident as inadmissible behavior by any member of the club.

=== Athletico Paranaense ===
On 4 March 2024, Cuca was announced as head coach of Athletico Paranaense. He asked to leave the club on 23 June, and his resignation was accepted by the board the following day.

=== Fourth spell at Atlético Mineiro ===
On 29 December 2024, Cuca returned to Galo for his fourth spell as a coach. He won the 2025 Campeonato Mineiro, reaching five titles in the tournament, but was sacked on 29 August of that year.

=== Fourth spell at Santos ===
On 19 March 2026, Santos announced the return of Cuca as a head coach on a contract until the end of the year; it was his fourth spell in charge of the club.

== Career statistics ==
=== Club ===
Club	Season	League			State League		Cup		Continental		Other		Total	
Club	Season	Division	Apps	Goals	Apps	Goals	Apps	Goals	Apps	Goals	Apps	Goals	Apps	Goals
Santa Cruz-RS	1984	Gaúcho	—		24	4	—		—		—		24	4
Santa Cruz-RS	1985	Gaúcho	—		0	0	—		—		18 (Note: 17 appearances and four goals in Copa ACEG, one appearance in Copa Bento Gonçalves)	4	18	4
Santa Cruz-RS	Total		—		24	4	—		—		18	4	42	8
Juventude	1985	Gaúcho	—		22	2	—		—		1 (Note: Appearance(s) in Copa Bento Gonçalves)	0	23	2
Juventude	1986	Série B	7	0	25	5	—		—		—		32	5
Juventude	1987	Série B	0	0	38	15	—		—		—		38	15
Juventude	Total		7	0	85	22	—		—		1	0	93	22
Grêmio	1987	Série A	13	7	—		—		—		—		13	7
Grêmio	1988	Série A	22	8	25	11	—		—		4 (Note: Appearance(s) in Supercopa Libertadores)	1	51	20
Grêmio	1989	Série A	13	4	24	7	9	6	—		5	2	51	19
Grêmio	1990	Série A	0	0	25	14	2	1	6 (Note: Appearance(s) in Copa Libertadores)	1	—		33	16
Grêmio	Total		48	19	74	32	11	7	6	1	9	3	148	62
Valladolid	1990–91	La Liga	12	4	—		2	1	—		—		14	5
Internacional	1991	Série A	13	3	21	5	—		—		—		34	8
Grêmio	1992	Série B	9	2	—		—		—		—		9	2
Palmeiras	1992	Série A	0	0	18	5	6	2	—		—		24	7
Santos	1993	Série A	9	2	29	9	—		—		3 (Note: Appearance(s) in Torneio Rio – São Paulo)	0	41	11
Portuguesa	1994	Série A	0	0	13	2	—		—		—		13	2
Remo	1994	Série A	13	2	—		—		—		—		13	2
Juventude	1995	Série A	14	1	23	8	4	0	—		—		41	9
Career total			125	33	287	82	23	10	6	1	31	7	472	133

=== International ===
Brazil
Year	Apps	Goals
1991	1	0
Total	1	0

== Coaching statistics ==
As of match played 18 November 2026

Coaching record by team and tenure
Team	Nat	From	To	Record								Ref
Team	Nat	From	To	G	W	D	L	GF	GA	GD	Win %	Ref
Uberlândia	(Brazil)	January 1998	June 1998	22	8	11	3	39	25	+14	36.36	
Inter de Limeira	(Brazil)	January 2000	February 2000	5	1	1	3	8	13	−5	20.00	
Inter de Lages	(Brazil)	March 2001	May 2001	12	3	5	4	13	17	−4	25.00	
Remo	(Brazil)	23 August 2001	22 October 2001	15	6	3	6	19	23	−4	40.00	
Criciúma	(Brazil)	October 2001	May 2002	30	13	8	9	48	44	+4	43.33	
Gama	(Brazil)	16 May 2002	4 July 2002	10	5	4	1	17	11	+6	50.00	
Paraná	(Brazil)	1 March 2003	26 May 2003	10	4	3	3	16	13	+3	40.00	
Goiás	(Brazil)	26 May 2003	17 December 2003	37	17	8	12	19	23	−4	45.95	
São Paulo	(Brazil)	17 December 2003	2 September 2004	51	30	8	13	81	49	+32	58.82	
Grêmio	(Brazil)	10 September 2004	28 October 2004	11	3	1	7	11	19	−8	27.27	
Flamengo	(Brazil)	3 February 2005	15 April 2005	12	5	4	3	20	17	+3	41.67	
Coritiba	(Brazil)	6 May 2005	12 October 2005	28	9	8	11	35	39	−4	32.14	
São Caetano	(Brazil)	9 November 2005	12 December 2005	5	2	2	1	8	7	+1	40.00	
Botafogo	(Brazil)	22 May 2006	28 September 2007	91	40	30	21	166	125	+41	43.96	
Botafogo	(Brazil)	7 October 2007	29 May 2008	42	26	8	8	90	42	+48	61.90	
Santos	(Brazil)	2 June 2008	7 August 2008	14	3	4	7	16	25	−9	21.43	
Fluminense	(Brazil)	11 August 2008	2 October 2008	9	2	5	2	12	11	+1	22.22	
Flamengo	(Brazil)	12 December 2008	23 July 2009	39	19	13	7	67	45	+22	48.72	
Fluminense	(Brazil)	1 September 2009	19 April 2010	44	27	11	6	88	50	+38	61.36	
Cruzeiro	(Brazil)	8 June 2010	19 June 2011	60	37	11	12	119	52	+67	61.67	
Atlético Mineiro	(Brazil)	8 August 2011	18 December 2013	153	80	34	39	264	167	+97	52.29	
Shandong Luneng	(China)	21 December 2013	6 December 2015	85	40	23	22	160	110	+50	47.06	
Palmeiras	(Brazil)	14 March 2016	30 November 2016	53	30	11	12	87	51	+36	56.60	
Palmeiras	(Brazil)	5 May 2017	13 October 2017	34	16	7	11	48	37	+11	47.06	
Santos	(Brazil)	30 July 2018	2 December 2018	26	10	8	8	32	23	+9	38.46	
São Paulo	(Brazil)	15 April 2019	26 September 2019	26	9	10	7	24	19	+5	34.62	
Santos	(Brazil)	7 August 2020	21 February 2021	44	18	14	12	63	54	+9	40.91	
Atlético Mineiro	(Brazil)	5 March 2021	28 December 2021	71	48	14	9	124	50	+74	67.61	
Atlético Mineiro	(Brazil)	25 July 2022	14 November 2022	21	7	7	7	20	19	+1	33.33	
Corinthians	(Brazil)	20 April 2023	27 April 2023	2	1	0	1	3	3	+0	50.00	
Athletico Paranaense	(Brazil)	4 March 2024	24 June 2024	23	14	4	5	46	16	+30	60.87	
Atlético Mineiro	(Brazil)	29 December 2024	29 August 2025	45	22	11	12	64	39	+25	48.89	
Santos	(Brazil)	19 March 2026	present	45	19	16	10	64	50	+14	42.22	
Total				1,175	574	307	294	1,891	1,288	+603	48.85	—

== Honours ==
=== Player ===
Grêmio

- Copa do Brasil: 1989
- Campeonato Gaúcho: 1989, 1990

Internacional

- Campeonato Gaúcho: 1991

Chapecoense

- Campeonato Catarinense: 1996

=== Coach ===
Flamengo

- Campeonato Carioca: 2009

Cruzeiro

- Campeonato Mineiro: 2011

Atlético Mineiro

- Campeonato Mineiro: 2012, 2013, 2021, 2025
- Copa Libertadores: 2013
- Campeonato Brasileiro Série A: 2021
- Copa do Brasil: 2021

Shandong Luneng

- Chinese FA Cup: 2014
- Chinese FA Super Cup: 2015

Palmeiras

- Campeonato Brasileiro Série A: 2016

Athletico Paranaense

- Campeonato Paranaense: 2024

=== Individual ===
- Campeonato Brasileiro Série A Coach of the Year: 2016, 2021
- Bola de Prata Best Coach: 2016, 2021
- Campeonato Mineiro Coach of the Year: 2011, 2012, 2013, 2021, 2025

== See also ==
- List of football managers with the most matches
