= Dener (footballer, born 1971) =

Brazilian footballer

Personal information
- Full name: Dener Augusto de Sousa
- Date of birth: 2 April 1971
- Place of birth: São Paulo, Brazil
- Date of death: 18 April 1994 (aged 23)
- Place of death: Rio de Janeiro, Brazil
- Height: 1.71 m (5 ft 7 1/2 in)
- Positions: Forward; attacking midfielder

Youth career
- 1988: São Paulo
- 1988–1989: Portuguesa

Senior career*
Years	Team	Apps	(Gls)
1989–1994	Portuguesa	106	(22)
1993	→ Grêmio (loan)	15	(4)
1994	→ Vasco da Gama (loan)	10	(3)
Total		131	(29)

International career
1991–1992	Brazil U23	9	(1)
1991–1994	Brazil	2	(0)
- * Club domestic league appearances and goals

Dener Augusto de Sousa (2 April 1971 – 18 April 1994), known simply as Dener, was a Brazilian footballer who played as a forward. He played twice for the Brazil national team. During his short career, Dener, wearing No.10, drew comparisons with Garrincha and Pele and he was considered one of Brazil's most talented young footballers of the 1990s. In early 1994, even Diego Maradona himself expressed his admiration for Dener's skills after a match against Newell's Old Boys, while his transfer to VfB Stuttgart a few months later never materialised due to his tragic death in a car accident.

== Early life ==
Dener was born to a poor family and he grew up with his mother from 1984, when his father lost his life and Dener started working to help his mother financially. He was considered a troubled kid during his youth years.

== Club career ==
=== Futsal ===
Born in São Paulo, Dener started his career with futsal where he excelled in his dribbling skills. By 1986 he was already getting a small stipend from futsal. The same year, he drew public attention during a futsal national tournament watched by 7,000 spectators and was also broadcast on TV. Dener's team won the trophy, and he also won the topscorer's and MVP award. The following day, scouts from São Paulo and Portuguesa approached him to join their clubs.

=== Youth ===
He started his football career at São Paulo FC's youth squad, in 1988, but after just two months he moved to Portuguesa's youth squad. In 1991, playing for Portuguesa, he won the Copa São Paulo de Juniores, and was elected the competition's best player.

=== Professional ===
==== Portuguesa ====
Despite being known for his temper and even violent incidents with opposing players during his youth career, in 1989, he was promoted to Portuguesa's first team squad. His debut against Gremio in 1989 was so impressive that prompted veteran wingback Alfinete to ask for his jersey after the match. In the 1989 Paulista championship he scored one of the most spectacular goals on the history of Portuguesea, dribbling past half the opposing team and scoring. He soon signed a new contract with the club demanding a Mitsubishi Eclipse sports car as a sign-on bonus. Dener became a highly valued asset for Portuguesa, with their president even considering renaming the club's stadium after Dener to keep him long term.

He stayed there until 1993, playing 47 Campeonato Brasileiro Série A matches, and scoring seven goals.

==== Loan moves to Gremio and Vasco ====
In 1993, Corinthians failed to sign him, as Portuguesa didn't agree on the fee, and then he was loaned to Grêmio of Porto Alegre that had also expressed interest in Dener in the past. With Gremio he won the Rio Grande do Sul State Championship During his time with Gremio, Dener became more focused on football after getting away from the São Paulo night scene and friends. He also played four Copa do Brasil matches in that year before returning to Portuguesa.

In January 1994 he was loaned to Vasco of Rio de Janeiro, under coach Jair Pereira. He played two Copa do Brasil matches and scored a goal, and posthumously won the Rio de Janeiro State Championship. On 21 January 1994, he played a friendly with Vasco against Newell's Old Boys in Argentina (at the Copa Diário La Capital tournament), with Diego Maradona returning to action from an injury. Dener's performance impressed Maradona so much that he went to Vasco da Gama's locker room to meet him after the match (score 0-0).

==== The transfer to Germany ====
Dener was signed by German side VfB Stuttgart for a $3 million fee ahead of the 1994-95 season. On 15 April 1994, he signed his contract with the German club, where he would be teammates with Brazil captain, Dunga.

== International career ==
=== Olympic team ===
Dener played 9 games for the Olympic team of Brazil between 1991 and 1992, but he failed to help them qualify to the 1992 Olympics. He was teammates to players like Cafu and Roberto Carlos.

=== National team ===
Dener played two matches for the Brazil national team, managed by Paulo Roberto Falcão. On March 27, 1991, he played against Argentina. He entered the pitch as a sub for only six minutes, but he made an impact helping Brazil to equalise after initiating a counter attack that ended in a goal.

Two months later, on May 28, he played against Bulgaria.

== Style of play ==
"Dener is the only player for whom I have made exceptions in my entire coaching career. From what I have experienced and seen play, he was the one who was closest to Pelé".."

— Pepe, Brazilian footballer and coach, Santos' legend

Dener was an explosive, agile, and diminutive attacking midfielder with a low centre of gravity. He would start most of his attack either from the centre or the wings. He was known for speed and his exceptional dribbling skills, stating himself that "sometimes a dribble can be more beautiful than a goal". However, he was considered undisciplined as a player, skipping training several times.

== Death ==
On 18 April 1994, in Rio de Janeiro, Dener died in an accident when his Mitsubishi Eclipse crashed into a tree at Borges de Medeiros Avenue, in the Lagoa Rodrigo de Freitas district. The car's driver was Dener's friend, Otto Gomes de Miranda, who lost both legs in the accident (rumoured to be a drug dealer and a friend of Romario's). Dener was strangled by the car's seat belt. His death shocked sports fans all over Brazil, a few weeks before the tragic loss of Ayrton Senna and the 1994 World Cup.

== Personal life ==
By the time of his death, Dener had fathered three children with different women. One month after his loan transfer to Vasco, in February 1994, his then girlfriend was killed in a car accident during the Rio carnival. Dener was known for his partying lifestyle, while he was good friends with goalkeeper Edinho, Pele's son.

== Legacy ==
After his death, many new parents in Brazil started naming their new-born babies "Dener". His former coach Pepe said that Dener was the only player he had seen in his life that "came close to Pele". Vasco da Game fans called him "Cafune" and chanted his name making a pun that Dener was "a mixture of Garrincha and Pele". His was nicknamed as "God of dribbling" by the Portuguesa fans and "Cafune" (hairline in Portuguese) by Vasco supporters.

== Career statistics ==
=== Club ===
Club	Season	League			State League		Cup		Continental		Other		Total	
Club	Season	Division	Apps	Goals	Apps	Goals	Apps	Goals	Apps	Goals	Apps	Goals	Apps	Goals
Portuguesa	1989	Série A	1	0	0	0	—		—		—		1	0
Portuguesa	1990	Série A	2	0	14	0	—		—		—		16	0
Portuguesa	1991	Série A	18	1	16	2	—		—		—		34	3
Portuguesa	1992	Série A	12	1	29	13	—		—		—		41	14
Portuguesa	1993	Série A	14	5	—		—		—		—		14	5
Portuguesa	Total		47	7	59	15	—		—		—		106	22
Grêmio (loan)	1993	Série A	—		15	4	4	0	—		—		19	4
Vasco da Gama (loan)	1994	Série A	—		10	3	2	1	—		—		12	4
Career total			47	7	84	22	6	1	0	0	0	0	137	30

=== International ===
Brazil
Year	Apps	Goals
1991	2	0
Total	2	0

== Honours ==
Portuguesa

- Copa São Paulo de Futebol Júnior: 1991

Grêmio

- Campeonato Gaúcho: 1993

Vasco da Gama

- Campeonato Carioca: 1994
- Copa Diário La Capital Argentina: 1994

== Sources ==
- Dener Augusto - All center circle
