= Alexandre Gallo =

Brazilian footballer (born 1967)

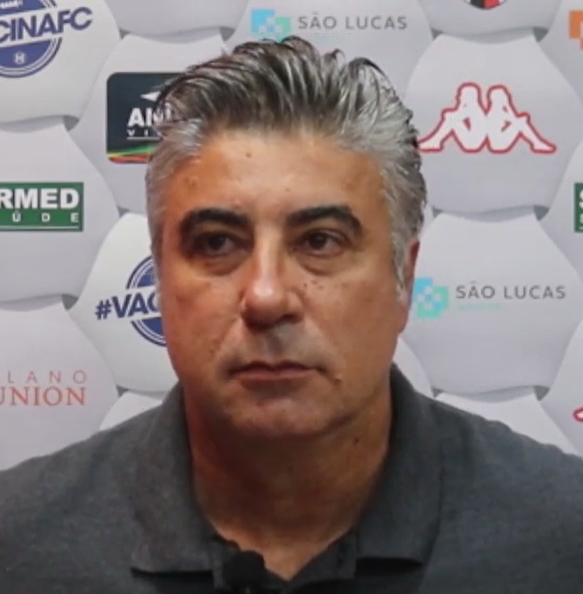
- Gallo in 2021

Personal information
- Full name: Alexandre Tadeu Gallo
- Date of birth: 29 May 1967 (age 59)
- Place of birth: Ribeirão Preto, Brazil
- Position: Defensive midfielder

Youth career
- 1980–1986: Botafogo-SP

Senior career*
Years	Team	Apps	(Gls)
1986–1992	Botafogo-SP		
1991	→ Vitória (loan)	3	(0)
1992–1996	Santos	183	(11)
1996	→ Portuguesa (loan)	25	(2)
1997	Guarani	12	(1)
1997–1998	São Paulo	23	(0)
1999	Botafogo	6	(0)
1999–2000	Atlético Mineiro	63	(4)
2001	Corinthians	6	(0)
Total		321	(18)

Managerial career
- 2002: Corinthians (assistant)
- 2003: Villa Nova
- 2003: Grêmio (assistant)
- 2004: Villa Nova
- 2004: Santos (assistant)
- 2005: Portuguesa
- 2005: Santos
- 2006: FC Tokyo
- 2007: Sport Recife
- 2007: Internacional
- 2007–2008: Figueirense
- 2008: Atlético Mineiro
- 2009: Bahia
- 2009: Santo André
- 2010: Náutico
- 2010–2011: Al-Ain
- 2011: Avaí
- 2012–2013: Náutico
- 2013–2015: Brazil U20
- 2013–2015: Brazil U23
- 2013: Brazil U17
- 2015–2016: Al-Qadisiyah
- 2016: Ponte Preta
- 2016: Náutico
- 2017: Vitória
- 2020: São Caetano
- 2021: Botafogo-SP
- 2021: Santa Cruz
- 2023: Cianorte
- 2023: Londrina
- * Club domestic league appearances and goals

Alexandre Tadeu Gallo (born 29 May 1967) is a Brazilian football coach and former player who played as a defensive midfielder.

== Playing career ==
Born in Ribeirão Preto, São Paulo, Gallo joined the youth categories of hometown side Botafogo-SP in 1980. He was promoted to the first team in 1986, and made his professional debut on 15 March of the following year, in a 2–1 Campeonato Paulista home win over Mogi Mirim.

Gallo was loaned to Vitória in 1991, before signing for Santos in the following year. He made his club debut on 18 July, in a 3–0 home win over former club Botafogo.

Gallo established himself as a regular starter for Peixe, being team captain during the 1995 Série A campaign. In August 1996, he was loaned to Portuguesa, where he was also a first-choice.

Sold to Guarani in January 1997, Gallo moved to São Paulo later in that year. On 11 February 1999, he agreed to a deal with Botafogo. He moved to Atlético Mineiro shortly after, before signing for Corinthians on 16 January 2001.

Gallo retired at the end of the 2001 season, aged 34.

== Coaching career ==
After retiring, Gallo joined Carlos Alberto Parreira's staff at his last club Corinthians in 2002, as his assistant. He also took over Villa Nova ahead of the 2003 season, and worked under the same role with Darío Pereyra at Grêmio, before returning to Villa Nova for the 2004 season.

Gallo returned to assistant duties after the 2004 Campeonato Mineiro, joining Vanderlei Luxemburgo's staff at Santos. On 11 February 2005, he replaced Zé Teodoro at the helm of Portuguesa, but left on 23 March to return to Santos, now as head coach.

Gallo was sacked by Peixe on 27 September 2005, and moved abroad for the first time in his career on 20 December, after taking over FC Tokyo in Japan.

Back to his home country, Gallo was named Sport Recife head coach for the 2007 season, but left for Internacional on 26 April of that year. He lifted the 2007 Recopa Sudamericana with the club, but was sacked on 10 August.

On 10 September 2007, Gallo was presented as Figueirense head coach. He left the club the following 18 May, and was announced at Atlético Mineiro two days later.

Gallo was dismissed by Galo on 31 July 2008, after a 6–1 loss to Vasco da Gama. Presented as Bahia head coach on 22 December, but was sacked on 5 July 2009.

Gallo took over Santo André on 30 July 2009, but was relieved from his duties on 4 September after just seven matches. On 19 February of the following year, he was named in charge of Náutico.

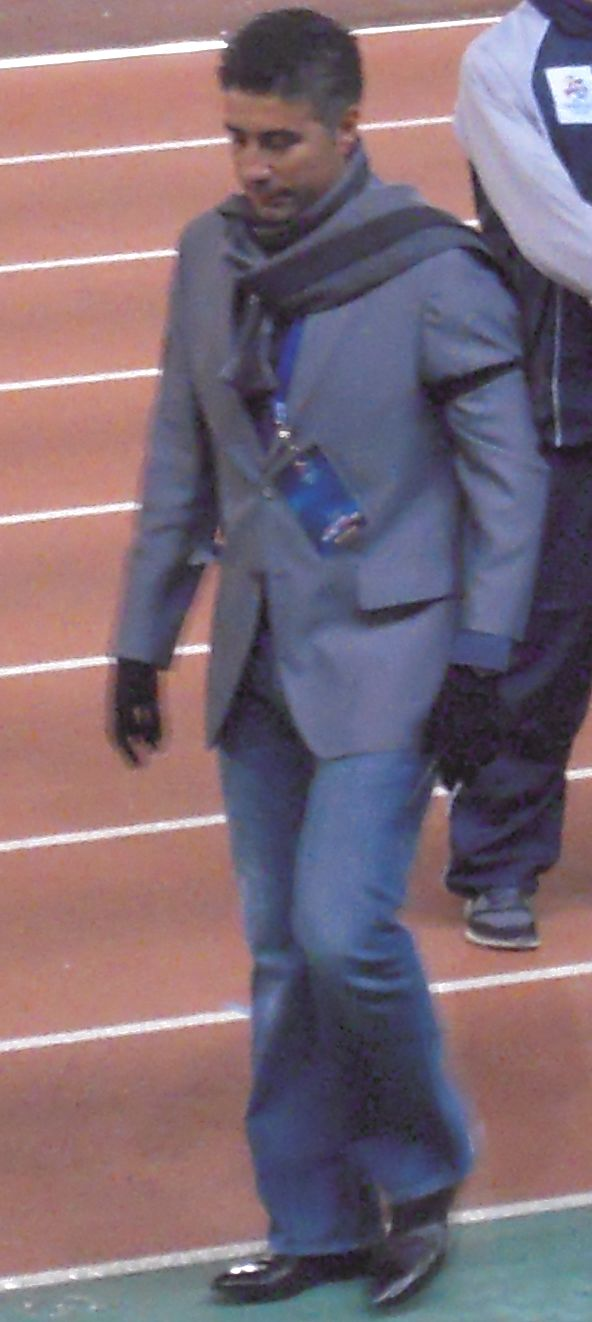
Gallo managing Al-Ain in 2011

Sacked by Timbu on 29 September 2010, Gallo moved to the United Arab Emirates after being appointed at Al-Ain on 21 December.

Gallo returned to Brazil on 14 June 2011, after being named Avaí head coach, but was sacked on 18 August. He returned to Náutico on 19 April 2012, and qualified the club to the 2013 Copa Sudamericana before renewing his contract on 6 December.

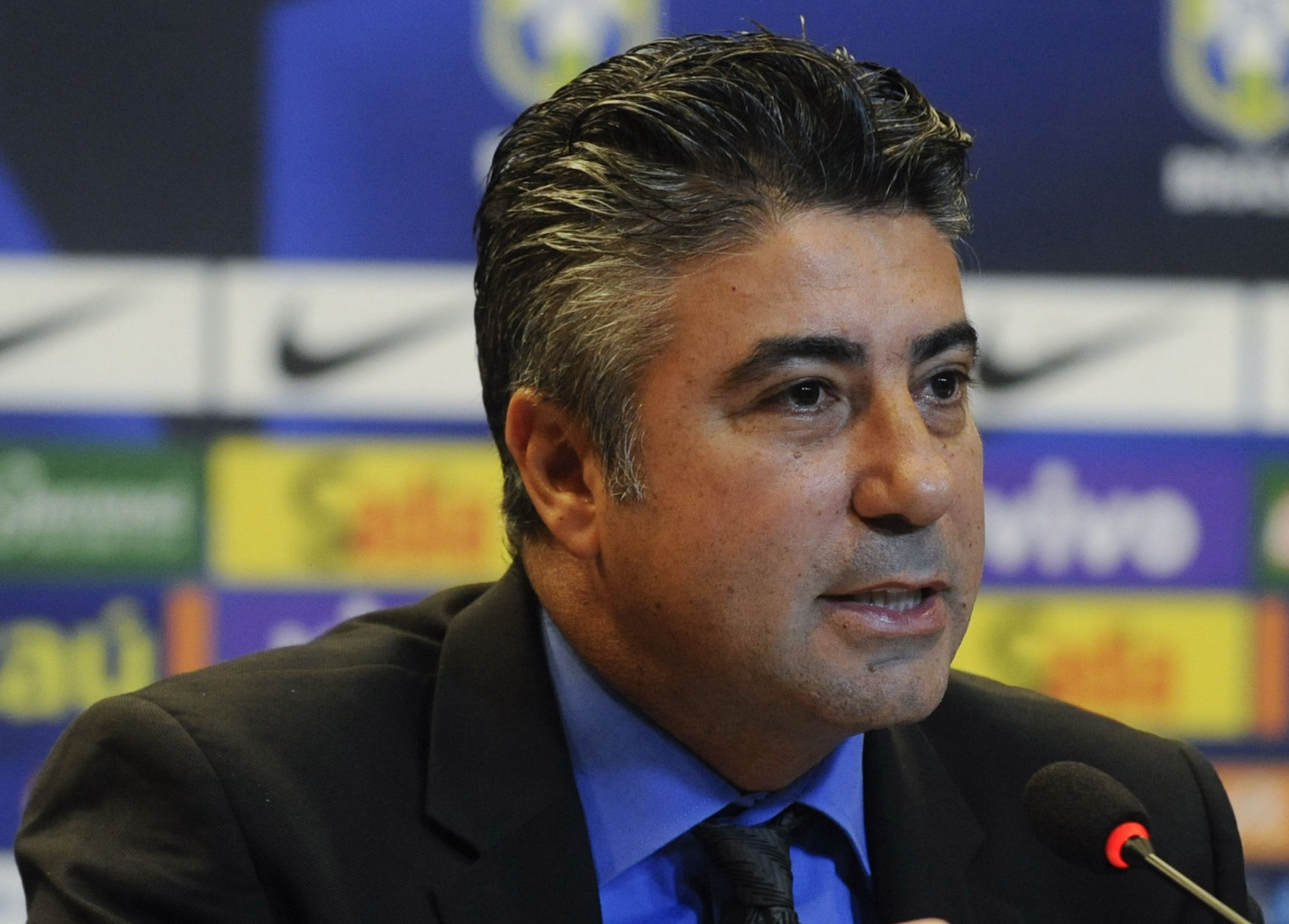
Gallo in 2014

On 29 January 2013, however, Gallo was named head coach of the Brazil national under-20 team. On 8 May 2015, after a poor campaign in the 2015 South American U-20 Championship, he was dismissed.

Galo moved to Saudi Arabia on 31 October 2015, taking over Al-Qadisiyah, but left by mutual consent the following 30 January. On 22 February 2016, he was named Ponte Preta head coach, but was sacked on 15 April.

On 27 April 2016, Gallo returned to Náutico for a third spell. On 4 September, after three losses in four matches, he was sacked.

On 3 June 2017, Gallo was named head coach of another club he represented as a player, Vitória. Sacked on 21 July, he returned to Atlético Mineiro on 11 December, now as a director of football.

Gallo was fired from Atlético on 30 October 2018, and spent a year without a club before returning to coaching duties on 25 January 2020, after being appointed São Caetano. On 12 October, after winning the year's Campeonato Paulista Série A2, he announced his departure.

Gallo was named head coach of his first club Botafogo-SP on 29 January 2021, but left on 1 April. He took over Santa Cruz twelve days later, but resigned twelve days after taking over, after just three matches.

On 19 September 2022, after more than a year without a club, Gallo agreed to become Cianorte's head coach for the ensuing season. He left the following 14 March to take over Londrina, but was sacked on 10 May.

On 9 August 2023, Gallo replaced Paulo Roberto Falcão as the technical coordinator of Santos. Despite being a part of the staff in the club's first-ever relegation, he remained at the club for the following season, but was dismissed on 3 January 2025.

== Career statistics ==
Club	Season	League			State League		Cup		Continental		Other		Total	
Club	Season	Division	Apps	Goals	Apps	Goals	Apps	Goals	Apps	Goals	Apps	Goals	Apps	Goals
Vitória	1991	Série A	3	0	—		2	0	—		—		5	0
Botafogo-SP	1992	Série B	10	2	8	0	—		—		—		18	2
Santos	1992	Série A	—		21	0	—		—		—		21	0
Santos	1993	Série A	14	2	26	3	—		1 (Note: Appearance(s) in Supercopa Libertadores)	0	1 (Note: Appearance(s) in Torneio Rio – São Paulo)	0	42	5
Santos	1994	Série A	22	1	26	2	—		2	0	7 (Note: Appearance(s) in Copa Bandeirantes)	0	57	3
Santos	1995	Série A	24	2	26	0	—		2	0	4 (Note: Appearance(s) in Copa dos Campeões Mundiais)	0	56	2
Santos	1996	Série A	0	0	24	1	2	0	0	0	3	0	29	1
Santos	Total		60	5	123	6	2	0	5	0	12	0	202	11
Portuguesa (loan)	1996	Série A	25	2	—		—		—		—		25	2
Guarani	1997	Série A	0	0	12	1	—		—		—		12	1
São Paulo	1997	Série A	7	0	—		—		—		—		7	0
São Paulo	1998	Série A	6	0	10	0	5	1	1 (Note: Appearance(s) in Copa Mercosur)	0	8	0	30	1
São Paulo	Total		13	0	10	0	5	1	1	0	8	0	37	1
Botafogo	1999	Série A	0	0	6	0	3	0	—		2	0	11	0
Atlético Mineiro	1999	Série A	28	2	12	0	—		—		—		40	2
Atlético Mineiro	2000	Série A	13	1	10	1	3	0	14 (Note: Nine appearances in Copa Libertadores, five appearances in Copa Mercosur)	0	6 (Note: Appearance(s) in Copa Sul-Minas)	0	46	2
Atlético Mineiro	Total		41	3	22	1	3	0	14	0	6	0	86	4
Corinthians	2001	Série A	0	0	6	0	2	0	—		3	0	11	0
Career total			152	12	187	8	17	1	20	0	31	0	407	21

== Managerial statistics ==
As of 19 December 2024

Managerial record by team and tenure
Team	Nat.	From	To	Record								Ref
Team	Nat.	From	To	G	W	D	L	GF	GA	GD	Win %	Ref
Villa Nova	(Brazil)	January 2003	April 2003	10	5	2	3	15	13	+2	50.00	
Villa Nova	(Brazil)	January 2004	April 2004	13	6	4	3	22	17	+5	46.15	
Portuguesa	(Brazil)	11 February 2005	22 March 2005	7	3	2	2	11	9	+2	42.86	
Santos	(Brazil)	23 March 2005	27 September 2005	41	19	11	11	76	57	+19	46.34	
FC Tokyo	(Japan)	20 December 2005	14 August 2006	23	6	5	12	26	34	−8	26.09	
Sport Recife	(Brazil)	7 December 2006	26 April 2007	23	18	4	1	50	10	+40	78.26	
Internacional	(Brazil)	26 April 2007	10 August 2007	20	8	3	9	30	27	+3	40.00	
Figueirense	(Brazil)	10 September 2007	18 May 2008	33	14	11	8	54	46	+8	42.42	
Atlético Mineiro	(Brazil)	20 May 2008	31 July 2008	14	4	4	6	19	29	−10	28.57	
Bahia	(Brazil)	22 December 2008	5 July 2009	38	20	10	8	72	38	+34	52.63	
Santo André	(Brazil)	30 July 2009	4 September 2009	7	2	0	5	5	11	−6	28.57	
Náutico	(Brazil)	19 February 2010	29 September 2010	31	13	5	13	38	51	−13	41.94	
Al-Ain	(United Arab Emirates)	21 December 2010	6 June 2011	20	8	3	9	32	28	+4	40.00	
Avaí	(Brazil)	14 June 2011	18 August 2011	13	3	3	7	14	26	−12	23.08	
Náutico	(Brazil)	19 April 2012	29 January 2013	42	15	9	18	50	56	−6	35.71	
Brazil U20	(Brazil)	29 January 2013	8 May 2015	22	14	5	3	38	15	+23	63.64	
Brazil U23	(Brazil)	1 May 2013	8 May 2015	11	10	1	0	28	6	+22	90.91	
Brazil U17	(Brazil)	1 October 2013	2 November 2013	5	4	1	0	19	4	+15	80.00	
Al-Qadisiyah	(Saudi Arabia)	31 October 2015	30 January 2016	10	1	3	6	5	13	−8	10.00	
Ponte Preta	(Brazil)	22 February 2016	15 April 2016	12	7	2	3	21	10	+11	58.33	
Náutico	(Brazil)	27 April 2016	4 September 2016	25	11	4	10	39	30	+9	44.00	
Vitória	(Brazil)	3 June 2017	21 July 2017	11	3	2	6	14	23	−9	27.27	
São Caetano	(Brazil)	25 January 2020	12 October 2020	21	11	4	6	30	22	+8	52.38	
Botafogo-SP	(Brazil)	29 January 2021	1 April 2021	4	0	1	3	1	8	−7	0.00	
Santa Cruz	(Brazil)	14 April 2021	26 April 2021	3	0	1	2	1	4	−3	0.00	
Cianorte	(Brazil)	19 September 2022	14 March 2023	12	5	1	6	15	23	−8	41.67	
Londrina	(Brazil)	14 March 2023	10 May 2023	5	1	1	3	3	8	−5	20.00	
Career total				476	211	102	163	728	618	+110	44.33	—

== Honours ==
=== Player ===
São Paulo

- Campeonato Paulista: 1998

Atlético Mineiro

- Campeonato Mineiro: 1999, 2000

Corinthians

- Campeonato Paulista: 2001

=== Coach ===
Sport

- Campeonato Pernambucano: 2007

Internacional

- Recopa Sudamericana: 2007

Figueirense

- Campeonato Catarinense: 2008

São Caetano

- Campeonato Paulista Série A2: 2020

Brazil U20

- L'Alcúdia International Football Tournament: 2014
- Panda Cup: 2014

Brazil Olympic Team

- Valais Youth Cup: 2013
- Toulon Tournament: 2013, 2014
