= Tico (footballer, born 1971) =

Brazilian footballer

Personal information
- Full name: Paulo Rogério Alves
- Date of birth: 14 January 1971 (age 55)
- Place of birth: São Paulo, Brazil
- Position: Right winger

Youth career
- –1991: Portuguesa

Senior career*
Years	Team	Apps	(Gls)
1990–1997	Portuguesa		
1992	→ Grêmio (loan)		
1993	→ Fortaleza (loan)		
1995	→ São Paulo (loan)	7	(4)
1998–1999	Coritiba		
1999–2002	Panionios		
2001	→ Paysandu (loan)		
2001	→ ABC (loan)		
2002	Alto Vale-SC		
2002	Confiança		
2003	Ituiutaba		

Managerial career
- 2015–2017: Portuguesa (youth)
- 2018–2022: Palmeiras (youth)
- 2022: Zahko
- * Club domestic league appearances and goals as of 30 December 2023

Paulo Rogério Alves (born 14 January 1971), simply known as Tico, is a Brazilian former professional footballer and manager who played as a right winger.

== Career ==
Tico appeared in the historic Portuguesa de Desportos team that won the Copa SP in 1991, alongside Dener and Bentinho. He also played for Grêmio, São Paulo, Coritiba, Panionios as well as several clubs in the northeast region.

== Managerial career ==
Tico worked as a coach in the Portuguesa youth categories from 2015 to 2017. In 2018, he was hired by SE Palmeiras, where he performed the same role in the children's categories. On 18 August 2022, he was announced as head coach of the Zakho SC in Iraq.

== Honours ==
Portuguesa

- Copa São Paulo de Futebol Jr.: 1991
