= Maurício (footballer, born 1970) =

Brazilian footballer

Personal information
- Full name: Maurício Assoline
- Date of birth: 8 July 1970 (age 56)
- Place of birth: Novo Horizonte, Brazil
- Height: 1.81 m (5 ft 11 in)
- Position: Goalkeeper

Youth career
- –1990: Novorizontino

Senior career*
Years	Team	Apps	(Gls)
1990–1991	Novorizontino		
1990	→ Portuguesa (loan)	14	(0)
1992	Ponte Preta		
1993	Santos		
1994	Paysandu		
1994–1995	Novorizontino		
1995–2001	Corinthians	121	(0)
2001	América Mineiro		
2002	Fluminense	8	(0)
2002	Botafogo-SP		
2003	Portuguesa Santista		
2003	Juventude		
2006	Noroeste		
2007	São Bento		
- * Club domestic league appearances and goals

Maurício Assoline (born 8 July 1970), known simply as Maurício, is a Brazilian former professional footballer who played as a goalkeeper.

== Career ==
Revealed by Novorizontino, Maurício was called up to the Brazil national team by coach Paulo Roberto Falcão in the early 1990s. He had a spell on loan at Portuguesa, but did not establish himself on that team. He later returned to Novorizontino, being part of the 1994 Série C champion squad. In 1995 he was hired by Corinthians, where he remained in 2001 and won several titles, most as a substitute. He was also Carioca champion at Fluminense and retired for the first time in 2003, at Juventude. He returned in 2006 and defended Noroeste and São Bento before retiring permanently.

== Honours ==
Novorizontino

- Campeonato Brasileiro Série C: 1994

Corinthians

- FIFA Club World Cup: 2000
- Campeonato Brasileiro: 1998, 1999
- Campeonato Paulista: 1997, 1999, 2001

Fluminense

- Campeonato Carioca: 2002
