= Clóvis (footballer, born 1970) =

Brazilian footballer

Personal information
- Full name: Clóvis Bento da Cruz
- Date of birth: 25 June 1970 (age 56)
- Place of birth: Barra do Garças, Brazil
- Height: 1.76 m (5 ft 9 in)
- Position: Striker

Youth career
- 1990: América (SP)

Senior career*
Years	Team	Apps	(Gls)
1990–1993	América (SP)		
1993–1994	Guarani		
1994	Benfica	1	(1)
1994–1995	→ Vitória de Setúbal (loan)	4	(1)
1995	→Vasco da Gama (loan )	41	(20)
1995	→ Corinthians (loan)	2	(1)
1996	Santos		
1996	Atlético Paranaense		
1998	Grêmio	8	(3)
1998	Atlético Paranaense	8	
1999–2000	Palestino		
2001	Barcelona SC		
2002	America (RJ)		
2002–2003	Deportivo Táchira		
2003	Francana		
2003	Mogi Mirim		
2004	Mirassol		
2004	América (RN)		
2005	América (SP)		
2005	Caldense		
- * Club domestic league appearances and goals

Clóvis Bento da Cruz (born 25 June 1970) is a Brazilian former footballer who played as a striker.

== Career ==
Born in Barra do Garças, Clóvis is a youth prospect of América (SP), from where he became a professional footballer, competing for club in the second level of the Campeonato Paulista. After moving to Guarani, he scored 13 goals in the 1993 Campeonato Brasileiro Série A, finishing one shy of top-scorer, Guga.

In 1994, he joined Benfica, debuting on 20 August 1994 in a home win against S.C. Beira-Mar, scoring the second goal. Three days later he played the first leg of the Supertaça Cândido de Oliveira, but was soon sidelined by manager Artur Jorge, who claimed he need time to adapt to Portugal, with Clóvis requesting to be loaned out. He briefly joined Vitória de Setúbal in the second half of 1994–95.

Clóvis returned to Brazil in 1995, to play for Vasco da Gama, where he would reunite with former teammate Paulão, and future Benfica striker, Valdir. He was the club top-scorer in the 1995 edition of the Campeonato Carioca and third overall. On 6 October 1995, he was loaned to Corinthians.

After a successful year in Vasco, Clóvis became a constant traveller, passing through 15 different clubs in ten years, retiring in 2005 at age 35 due to heart problems.
