= 1993 Campeonato Brasileiro Série A =

Campeonato Brasileiro Série A
- Season: 1993
- Champions: Palmeiras (7th title)
- Copa Libertadores: São Paulo (title holders); Palmeiras; Cruzeiro (via Copa do Brasil)

The 1993 Campeonato Brasileiro Série A was the 37th edition of the Campeonato Brasileiro Série A.

== Overview ==
It was contested by 32 teams, and Palmeiras won the championship.

== Format ==
The first phase of the season had the 32 teams divided into four groups of eight teams. The top three teams from group A and group B qualified for the second phase. The top two teams from group C and group D would playoff to determine two more teams for the second phase. The bottom four teams from group C and group D were relegated.

== First phase ==
=== Group A ===
Pos	Team	Pld	W	D	L	GF	GA	GD	Pts	Qualification
1	Corinthians	14	10	4	0	27	8	+19	24	Qualified to second phase
2	São Paulo	14	5	7	2	19	12	+7	17	Qualified to second phase
3	Flamengo	14	6	4	4	17	16	+1	16	Qualified to second phase
4	Cruzeiro	14	6	2	6	22	15	+7	14	
5	Internacional	14	5	4	5	17	20	−3	14	
6	Bragantino	14	2	9	3	18	16	+2	13	
7	Bahia	14	2	4	8	10	29	−19	8	
8	Botafogo	14	2	2	10	7	21	−14	6	

==== Results ====
Home \ Away	BAH	BOT	BRG	COR	CRU	FLA	INT	SPA
Bahia		1–0	1–0	1–3	1–3	1–1	0–1	1–1
Botafogo	3–0		1–1	0–1	0–1	0–1	2–0	0–4
Bragantino	2–2	0–0		0–0	1–0	5–1	3–3	0–0
Corinthians	5–1	5–1	2–1		2–1	1–0	2–0	1–0
Cruzeiro	6–0	3–0	1–0	0–2		1–2	4–1	1–1
Flamengo	1–1	2–0	1–1	1–1	2–1		3–0	2–0
Internacional	1–0	1–0	1–1	1–1	3–0	2–0		1–1
São Paulo	2–0	1–0	3–3	1–1	0–0	2–0	3–2	

Source: http://www.rsssfbrasil.com/tablesae/br1993.htm
Legend: Blue = home team win; Yellow = draw; Red = away team win.

=== Group B ===
Pos	Team	Pld	W	D	L	GF	GA	GD	Pts	Qualification
1	Palmeiras	14	10	2	2	27	14	+13	22	Qualified to second phase
2	Santos	14	8	4	2	24	14	+10	20	Qualified to second phase
3	Guarani	14	7	5	2	21	13	+8	19	Qualified to second phase
4	Grêmio	14	6	3	5	20	17	+3	15	
5	Vasco da Gama	14	5	3	6	19	20	−1	13	
6	Sport	14	4	3	7	10	21	−11	11	
7	Fluminense	14	3	2	9	18	26	−8	8	
8	Atlético Mineiro	14	1	2	11	7	21	−14	4	

=== Group C ===
Pos	Team	Pld	W	D	L	GF	GA	GD	Pts	Qualification or relegation
1	Vitória	14	9	2	3	27	14	+13	20	Qualified to playoff
2	Remo	14	8	1	5	28	17	+11	17	Qualified to playoff
3	Paysandu	14	6	5	3	15	13	+2	17	
4	Náutico	14	5	4	5	14	18	−4	14	
5	Ceará	14	6	1	7	16	19	−3	13	Relegated
6	Santa Cruz	14	5	2	7	20	17	+3	12	Relegated
7	Goiás	14	2	6	6	12	22	−10	10	Relegated
8	Fortaleza	14	2	5	7	11	23	−12	9	Relegated

=== Group D ===
Pos	Team	Pld	W	D	L	GF	GA	GD	Pts	Qualification or relegation
1	Portuguesa	14	7	3	4	23	16	+7	17	Qualified to playoff
2	Paraná	14	6	5	3	17	11	+6	17	Qualified to playoff
3	União São João	14	6	4	4	21	11	+10	16	
4	Criciúma	14	6	3	5	18	20	−2	15	
5	América Mineiro	14	4	6	4	18	18	0	14	Relegated
6	Coritiba	14	3	7	4	10	15	−5	13	Relegated
7	Atlético Paranaense	14	3	6	5	14	16	−2	12	Relegated
8	Desportiva Capixaba	14	1	6	7	9	23	−14	8	Relegated

== Playoffs ==
Team 1	Agg.	Team 2	1st leg	2nd leg
Paraná (Paraná (state))	1-1 (r)	(Bahia) Vitória	1-1	0-0
Remo (Pará)	5-4 (r)	(São Paulo (state)) Portuguesa	5-2	0-2

== Second phase ==
=== Group E ===
Pos	Team	Pld	W	D	L	GF	GA	GD	Pts	Qualification
1	Vitória	6	2	4	0	11	9	+2	8	Qualified for the final
2	Corinthians	6	2	3	1	11	10	+1	7	
3	Santos	6	1	3	2	11	12	−1	5	
4	Flamengo	6	0	4	2	6	8	−2	4	

=== Group F ===
Pos	Team	Pld	W	D	L	GF	GA	GD	Pts	Qualification
1	Palmeiras	6	4	2	0	10	3	+7	10	Qualified for the final
2	São Paulo	6	4	1	1	8	5	+3	9	
3	Guarani	6	1	1	4	12	12	0	3	
4	Remo	6	0	2	4	4	14	−10	2	

== Finals ==
12 December 1993
16:00

Vitória	0 - 1	Palmeiras
		Edílson 77'

Fonte Nova Stadium, Salvador
Attendance: 77,772
Referee: Renato Marsiglia

19 December 1993
16:00

Palmeiras	2 - 0	Vitória
Evair 4'; Edmundo 23'

Morumbi Stadium, São Paulo
Attendance: 88,644
Referee: Márcio Rezende de Freitas

== Final standings ==
Pos	Team	Pld	W	D	L	GF	GA	GD	Pts
1	Palmeiras	22	16	4	2	40	17	+23	36
2	Vitória	24	11	8	5	39	27	+12	30
3	Corinthians	20	12	7	1	38	18	+20	31
4	São Paulo	20	9	8	3	27	17	+10	26
5	Santos	20	9	7	4	35	26	+9	25
6	Guarani	20	8	6	6	33	25	+8	22
7	Remo	22	9	3	10	37	35	+2	21
8	Flamengo	20	6	8	6	23	24	−1	20
9	Portuguesa	16	8	3	5	27	21	+6	19
10	Paraná	16	6	7	3	18	12	+6	19
11	Grêmio	14	6	3	5	20	17	+3	15
12	Cruzeiro	14	6	2	6	22	15	+7	14
13	Internacional	14	5	4	5	17	20	−3	14
14	Bragantino	14	2	9	3	18	16	+2	13
15	Vasco da Gama	14	5	3	6	19	20	−1	13
16	Sport	14	4	3	7	10	21	−11	11
17	Fluminense	14	3	2	9	18	26	−8	8
18	Bahia	14	2	4	8	10	29	−19	8
19	Botafogo	14	2	2	10	7	21	−14	6
20	Atlético Mineiro	14	1	2	11	7	21	−14	4
21	Paysandu	14	6	5	3	15	13	+2	17
22	União São João	14	6	4	4	21	11	+10	16
23	Criciúma	14	6	3	5	18	20	−2	15
24	América Mineiro	14	4	6	4	18	18	0	14
25	Náutico	14	5	4	5	14	18	−4	14
26	Ceará	14	6	1	7	16	19	−3	13
27	Coritiba	14	3	7	4	10	15	−5	13
28	Santa Cruz	14	5	2	7	20	17	+3	12
29	Atlético Paranaense	14	3	6	5	14	16	−2	12
30	Goiás	14	2	6	6	12	22	−10	10
31	Fortaleza	14	2	5	7	11	23	−12	9
32	Desportiva Capixaba	14	1	6	7	9	23	−14	8

== Top scorers ==
Pos.	Scorer	Club	Goals
1	(Brazil) Guga	Santos	14
2	(Brazil) Clóvis	Guarani	13
3	(Brazil) Ronaldo	Cruzeiro	12
4	(Brazil) Edmundo	Palmeiras	11
4	(Brazil) Rivaldo	Corinthians	11
