= Darci (footballer, born 1966) =

Brazilian footballer

Personal information
- Full name: Darci Luiz Simon
- Date of birth: 25 May 1966 (age 60)
- Place of birth: Campina das Missões, Brazil
- Height: 1.75 m (5 ft 9 in)
- Positions: Attacking midfielder; forward

Youth career
- –1985: Grêmio

Senior career*
Years	Team	Apps	(Gls)
1985–1991	Grêmio	179	(14)
1991–1992	Rio Branco-SP		
1992	Ponte Preta		
1993	Santos		
1994–1995	Atlético Mineiro	71	(9)
1995–1996	Fluminense	40	(1)
1996	Bahia		
1997	Rio Branco-SP		
1997	Ferroviária		
1998	Ituano		
1998	Palmeiras	24	(3)
1999	Coritiba		
2000	Portuguesa Santista		
2000	Santa Cruz		
2001	Brasiliense		
2001–2002	Olaria		
2003	Santo Ângelo		
- * Club domestic league appearances and goals

Darci Luiz Simon (born 25 May 1966), simply known as Darci, is a Brazilian former professional footballer who played as an attacking midfielder and forward.

== Career ==
Having played for several major Brazilian teams, Darci made history mainly at Grêmio, the club that revealed him, Atlético Mineiro, Palmeiras and Coritiba, the club where he scored the decisive goal in the 1999 Campeonato Paranaense title.

In 1989, in a match Grêmio vs. Palmeiras, he seriously injured striker Mirandinha in a fight with a kick to the face, causing Mirandinha to undergo surgery on his face.

== Honours ==
Grêmio

- Campeonato Gaúcho: 1987, 1988, 1989, 1990
- Copa do Brasil: 1989
- Supercopa do Brasil: 1990

Atlético Mineiro

- Campeonato Mineiro: 1995

Palmeiras

- Copa do Brasil: 1998
- Copa Mercosur: 1998

Coritiba

- Campeonato Paranaense: 1999
