= Estádio Doutor Jorge Ismael de Biasi =

Multi-use stadium in Novo Horizonte, São Paulo, Brazil

Jorge Ismael de Biasi
- Jorjão, Arena Novorizontino
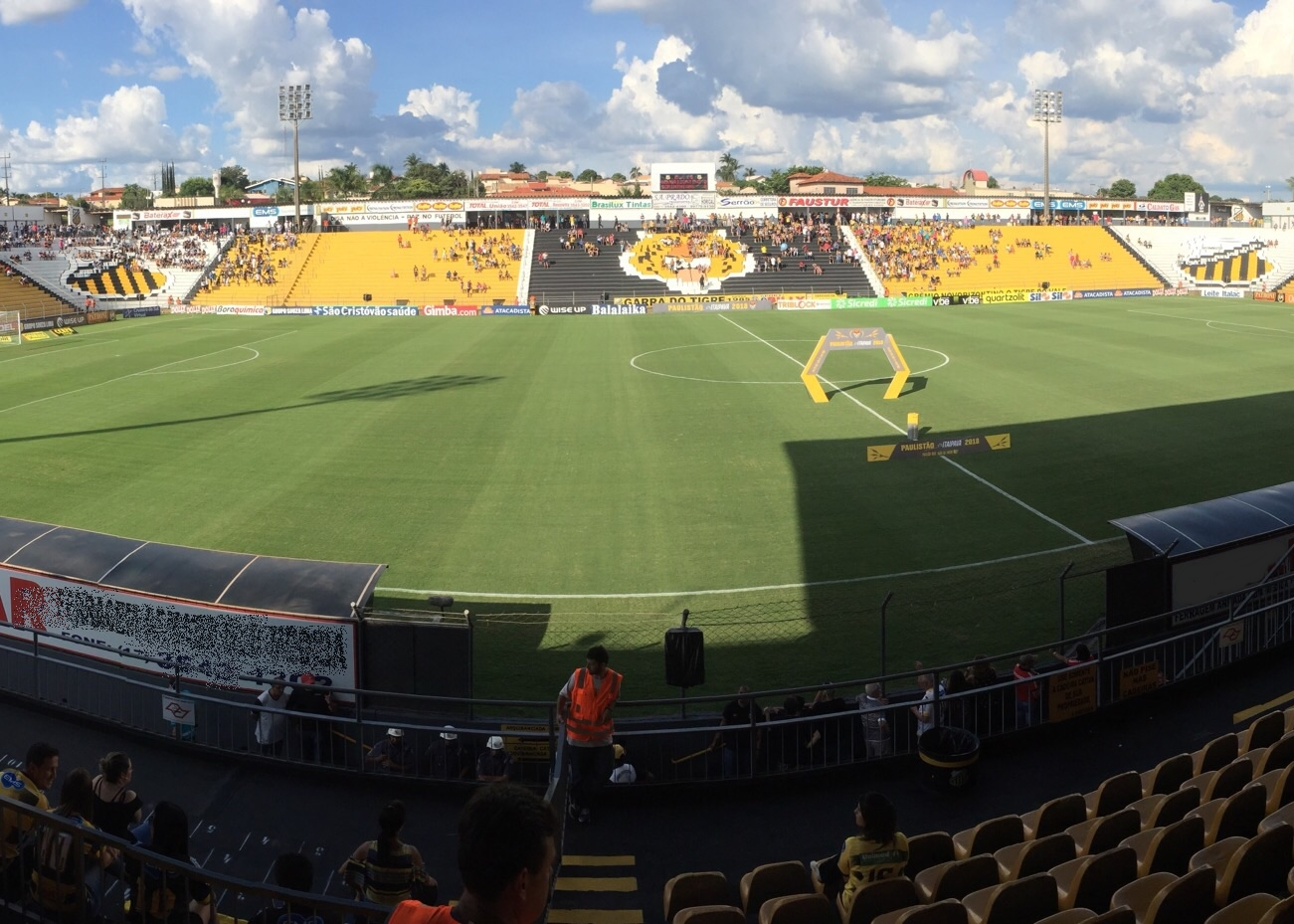
- Interactive map of Jorge Ismael de Biasi
- Full name: Estádio Doutor Jorge Ismael de Biasi
- Location: Novo Horizonte, SP, Brazil
- Coordinates: 21.466880631923406°S 49.23213522740111°W
- Owner: Grêmio Novorizontino
- Operator: Grêmio Novorizontino
- Capacity: 14,096
- Surface: Natural grass
- Field size: 105 by 68 metres (114.8 yd × 74.4 yd)

Construction
- Opened: 22 March 1987
- Renovated: 2015–2016

Tenants
- Novorizontino (1987–1999); Grêmio Novorizontino (2010–present)

Estádio Doutor Jorge Ismael de Biasi, sometimes known as Jorjão, is a multi-use stadium in Novo Horizonte, São Paulo, Brazil. It is used mostly for football matches, and has a maximum capacity of 14,096 people.

Inaugurated on 22 March 1987 in a match between Novorizontino and Internacional de Limeira, the stadium was named after Jorge Ismael de Biasi, the man that build the stadium with his own resources. In March 2020, the club inaugurated a new facade and honoured Dr. de Biasi with a statue.

== See also ==
- List of football stadiums in Brazil
- Lists of stadiums
