= Lula (footballer, born 1966) =

Brazilian footballer (born 1966)

Personal information
- Full name: Luiz Bonfim Marcos
- Date of birth: 15 June 1966 (age 60)
- Place of birth: Itaporanga d'Ajuda, Brazil
- Height: 1.90 m (6 ft 3 in)
- Position: Centre-back

Senior career*
Years	Team	Apps	(Gls)
1985	Confiança		
1986–1987	Santa Cruz		
1988–1992	Famalicão	58	(0)
1992–1993	São Paulo	32	(2)
1993	Santos		
1994	Coritiba		
1994–1995	União de Leiria	17	(0)
1995–1996	Belenenses	29	(0)
1996–1998	Porto	9	(1)
1998–1999	Vitória		
2000	Paços de Ferreira		
2000–2001	Sichuan Guancheng		
2002–2003	Qingdao Hainiu		
- * Club domestic league appearances and goals

Luiz Bonfim Marcos (born 15 June 1966), better known as Lula, is a Brazilian former professional footballer who played as a centre-back.

== Career ==
Born in Sergipe, Lula stood out for his height, as well as his ability to initiate plays from defensive field. He was two-time state champion with Santa Cruz and later transferred to FC Famalicão. In 1992, he arrived at São Paulo and was part of the winning squad of the 1992 Campeonato Paulista and the 1993 Copa Libertadores. He also played for Santos and Coritiba before returning to Portugal. Lula was two-time champion with FC Porto in the 1996–97 and 1997–1998 seasons, and won a second division title with FC Paços de Ferreira. He ended his career in Chinese football.

== Honours ==
Santa Cruz

- Campeonato Pernambucano: 1986, 1987

São Paulo

- Copa Libertadores: 1993
- Campeonato Paulista: 1992

Porto

- Primeira Liga: 1996–97, 1997–98
- Taça de Portugal: 1997–98
- Supertaça Cândido de Oliveira: 1996

Paços de Ferreira

- Liga Portugal 2: 1999–2000
