= Guga (footballer, born 1964) =

Brazilian footballer (born 1964)

Personal information
- Full name: Alexandre da Silva
- Date of birth: 14 June 1964 (age 62)
- Place of birth: Osasco, Brazil
- Height: 1.81 m (5 ft 11 in)
- Position: Forward

Senior career*
| Years | Team | Apps | (Gls) |
| 1984 | Cabofriense | | |
| 1984 | Juventus | | |
| 1985–1987 | Esmeraldas Petrolero | | |
| 1987 | Itabuna | | |
| 1987–1989 | Atlético Mineiro | | |
| 1989 | Goiânia | | |
| 1990 | Goiás | | |
| 1990 | Flamengo | | |
| 1990 | Internacional | | |
| 1991 | Goiânia | | |
| 1991 | Internacional-Limeira | | |
| 1992–1995 | Santos | | |
| 1995 | Botafogo | | |
| 1995–1996 | Al-Ahli | | |
| 1996 | Cerezo Osaka | | |
| 1997 | Araçatuba | | |
| 1997 | Atlético Paranaense | | |
| 1998 | Bangu | | |
| 1999 | Paysandu | | |
| 2000 | Remo | | |
| 2001 | Bangu | | |
| 2001 | Cabofriense | | |
- * Club domestic league appearances and goals as of 3 June 2007

Alexandre da Silva, nicknamed Guga (born 14 June 1964 in Osasco, Brazil) is a Brazilian former footballer who was the Top Scorer for the 1993 Brazilian Serie A with 14 goals.

Guga played for Goiás and Santos in the Campeonato Brasileiro.

== Club statistics ==
| Club performance | | | League | | Cup | | League Cup | | Total | |
| Season | Club | League | Apps | Goals | Apps | Goals | Apps | Goals | Apps | Goals |
| Japan | | | League | | Emperor's Cup | | J.League Cup | | Total | |
|---|---|---|---|---|---|---|---|---|---|---|
| 1996 | Cerezo Osaka | J1 League | 4 | 0 | 0 | 0 | 0 | 0 | 4 | 0 |
| Total | | | 4 | 0 | 0 | 0 | 0 | 0 | 4 | 0 |

== Honors ==
- Brazilian League Top Scorer: 1993
