= 1990 in Brazilian football =

Football in Brazil
- Season: 1990

The following article presents a summary of the 1990 football (soccer) season in Brazil, which was the 89th season of competitive football in the country.

== Campeonato Brasileiro Série A ==
Quarterfinals

Team 1	Agg.	Team 2	1st leg	2nd leg
Corinthians	2-1	Atlético Mineiro	2-1	0-0
Santos	1-2	São Paulo	0-1	1-1
Palmeiras	1-2	Grêmio	1-0	0-2
Bragantino	3-4	Bahia	1-1	2-3

Semifinals

Team 1	Agg.	Team 2	1st leg	2nd leg
São Paulo	2-1	Grêmio	2-0	0-1
Corinthians	2-1	Bahia	2-1	0-0

Final

December 13, 1990

Corinthians	1–0	São Paulo

Morumbi

December 16, 1990

São Paulo	0–1	Corinthians

Morumbi

Corinthians declared as the Campeonato Brasileiro champions by aggregate score of 2-0.

=== Relegation ===
The two worst placed teams in the first stage, which are São José-SP and Internacional-SP, were relegated to the following year's second level.

== Campeonato Brasileiro Série B ==
Third stage

Group I
Pos	Team	Pld	W	D	L	GF	GA	GD	Pts	Qualification
1	Sport	6	3	3	0	8	5	+3	9	Advanced to the final
2	Guarani	6	3	2	1	10	3	+7	8	
3	Juventude	6	2	2	2	6	7	−1	6	
4	Moto Club	6	0	1	5	5	14	−9	1	

Group J
Pos	Team	Pld	W	D	L	GF	GA	GD	Pts	Qualification
1	Atlético Paranaense	6	2	3	1	7	5	+2	7	Advanced to the final
2	Criciúma	6	2	2	2	10	5	+5	6	
3	Operário-PR	6	2	2	2	5	9	−4	6	
4	Catuense	6	2	1	3	7	10	−3	5	

Final

December 12, 1990

Atlético Paranaense	1–1	Sport

Pinheirão

December 16, 1990

Sport	0–0	Atlético Paranaense

Ilha do Retiro

Sport declared as the Campeonato Brasileiro Série B champions by aggregate score of 1-1.

=== Promotion ===
The champion and the runner-up, which are Sport and Atlético Paranaense, were promoted to the following year's first level.

=== Relegation ===
The four worst placed teams, which are Anapolina, Coritiba, Americano and Treze, were relegated to the following year's third level.

== Campeonato Brasileiro Série C ==
Quarterfinals

Team 1	Agg.	Team 2	1st leg	2nd leg
América-MG	4-2	Paysandu	4-0	0-2
Fortaleza	0-1	América-RN	0-0	0-1
Gama	1-4	Atlético Goianiense	1-0	0-4
Bangu	1-1	Paraná	1-1	0-0

Semifinals

Team 1	Agg.	Team 2	1st leg	2nd leg
América-MG	2-1	Paraná	1-0	1-1
América-RN	2-7	Atlético Goianiense	0-2	2-5

Final

América-MG	0–0	Atlético Goianiense

Atlético Goianiense	0–0 (3–2 pen)	América-MG

Atlético Goianiense declared as the Campeonato Brasileiro Série C champions by aggregate score of 0-0.

=== Promotion ===
The four quarterfinal winners, which are Atlético Goianiense, América-MG, Paraná and América-RN, were promoted to the following year's second level.

== Copa do Brasil ==
The Copa do Brasil final was played between Flamengo and Goiás.

November 1, 1990

Flamengo	1–0	Goiás

Mário Helênio

November 7, 1990

Goiás	0–0	Flamengo

Serra Dourada

Flamengo declared as the cup champions by aggregate score of 1-0.

== State championship champions ==
State	Champion	State	Champion
Acre	Juventus-AC	Paraíba	Auto Esporte
Alagoas	CSA	Paraná	Atlético Paranaense
Amapá	Amapá	Pernambuco	Santa Cruz
Amazonas	Rio Negro	Piauí	Tiradentes
Bahia	Vitória	Rio de Janeiro	Botafogo
Ceará	Ceará	Rio Grande do Norte	ABC
Distrito Federal	Gama	Rio Grande do Sul	Grêmio
Espírito Santo	Colatina	Rondônia	not disputed
Goiás	Goiás	Roraima	Atlético Roraima
Maranhão	Sampaio Corrêa	Santa Catarina	Criciúma
Mato Grosso	Sinop	São Paulo	Bragantino
Mato Grosso do Sul	Ubiratan	Sergipe	Confiança
Minas Gerais	Cruzeiro	Tocantins	-
Pará	Remo		

== Youth competition champions ==
Competition	Champion
Copa Santiago de Futebol Juvenil	Internacional
Copa São Paulo de Juniores	Flamengo
Taça Belo Horizonte de Juniores	Internacional

== Other competition champions ==
Competition	Champion
Copa Santa Catarina	Figueirense
Supercopa do Brasil	Grêmio
Torneio de Integração da Amazônia	Trem

== Brazilian clubs in international competitions ==
Team	Copa Libertadores 1990	Supercopa Sudamericana 1990
Cruzeiro	Did not qualify	Round of 16
Flamengo	Did not qualify	Round of 16
Grêmio	Group stage	Round of 16
Santos	Did not qualify	Round of 16
Vasco	Quarterfinals	Did not qualify

== Brazil national team ==
The following table lists all the games played by the Brazil national football team in official competitions and friendly matches during 1990.

Date	Opposition	Result	Score	Brazil scorers	Competition
March 28, 1990	England	L	0-1	-	International Friendly
May 5, 1990	Bulgaria	W	2-1	Aldair, Müller	International Friendly
May 13, 1990	East Germany	D	3-3	Alemão, Careca, Dunga	International Friendly
May 19, 1990	(Community of Madrid) Madrid Combined Team	W	1-0	Branco	International Friendly (unofficial match)
May 28, 1990	Umbria Combined Team	L	0-1	-	International Friendly (unofficial match)
June 10, 1990	Sweden	W	2-1	Careca (2)	World Cup
June 16, 1990	Costa Rica	W	1-0	Müller	World Cup
June 20, 1990	Scotland	W	1-0	Müller	World Cup
June 24, 1990	Argentina	L	0-1	-	World Cup
September 12, 1990	Spain	L	0-3	-	International Friendly
October 17, 1990	Chile	D	0-0	-	Friendship Cup
October 31, 1990	Rest of the World	L	1-2	Neto	International Friendly (unofficial match)
November 8, 1990	Chile	D	0-0	-	Friendship Cup
December 12, 1990	Mexico	D	0-0	-	International Friendly

== Women's football ==
=== National team ===
The Brazil women's national football team did not play any matches in 1990.
