= 1994 in Brazilian football =

Football in Brazil
- Season: 1994

The following article presents a summary of the 1994 football (soccer) season in Brazil, which was the 93rd season of competitive football in the country.

== Campeonato Brasileiro Série A ==
Quarterfinals

Team 1	Agg.	Team 2	1st leg	2nd leg
Bragantino	1-1	Corinthians	1-1	0-0
São Paulo	3-4	Guarani	1-0	2-4
Bahia	2-4	Palmeiras	1-2	1-2
Atlético Mineiro	3-2	Botafogo	2-0	1-2

Semifinals

Team 1	Agg.	Team 2	1st leg	2nd leg
Atlético Mineiro	3-3	Corinthians	3-2	0-1
Palmeiras	5-2	Guarani	3-1	2-1

Final

December 15, 1994

Corinthians	1–3	Palmeiras

Pacamebu

December 18, 1994

Palmeiras	1–1	Corinthians

Pacamebu

Palmeiras declared as the Campeonato Brasileiro champions by aggregate score of 4–2.

=== Relegation ===
The two worst placed teams in the repechage, which are Remo and Náutico, were relegated to the following year's second level.

== Campeonato Brasileiro Série B ==
Semifinals

Team 1	Agg.	Team 2	1st leg	2nd leg
Americano	0-2	Juventude	0-1	0-1
Desportiva	2-2	Goiás	3-1	2-1

Final

November 27, 1994

Goiás	2–1	Juventude

December 4, 1994

Juventude	2–1	Goiás

Goiás declared as the Campeonato Brasileiro Série B champions by aggregate score of 3-3.

=== Promotion ===
The champion and runner-up, which are Goiás and Juventude, were promoted to the following year's first level.

=== Relegation ===
The two worst placed teams in all the four groups in the first stage, which are Fortaleza and Tiradentes-DF, were relegated to the following year's third level.

== Campeonato Brasileiro Série C ==
Quarterfinals

Team 1	Agg.	Team 2	1st leg	2nd leg
Valeriodoce	3-4	Ferroviária	2-2	1-3
ABC	4-5	Catuense	4-2	0-3
Ituano	1-3	Novorizontino	1-0	0-3
Maruinense	2-5	Uberlândia	2-2	0-3

Semifinals

Team 1	Agg.	Team 2	1st leg	2nd leg
Catuense	1-2	Ferroviária	1-0	0-2
Novorizontino	3-1	Uberlândia	2-0	1-1

Final

December 4, 1994

Ferroviária	0–1	Novorizontino

December 9, 1994

Novorizontino	5–0	Ferroviária

Novorizontino declared as the Campeonato Brasileiro Série C champions by aggregate score of 6–0.

=== Promotion ===
The champion and the runner-up, which are Novorizontino and Ferroviária, were promoted to the following year's second level.

== Copa do Brasil ==
The Copa do Brasil final was played between Grêmio and Ceará.

August 7, 1994

Ceará	0–0	Grêmio

Castelão

August 10, 1994

Grêmio	1–0	Ceará

Olímpico

Grêmio declared as the cup champions by aggregate score of 1–0.

== State championship champions ==
State	Champion	State	Champion
Acre	Rio Branco	Paraíba	Sousa
Alagoas	CSA	Paraná	Paraná
Amapá	Ypiranga	Pernambuco	Sport Recife
Amazonas	América-AM	Piauí	Picos
Bahia	Bahia	Rio de Janeiro	Vasco
Ceará	Ferroviário-CE	Rio Grande do Norte	ABC
Distrito Federal	Gama	Rio Grande do Sul	Internacional
Espírito Santo	Desportiva	Rondônia	Ariquemes
Goiás	Goiás	Roraima	Ríver-RR
Maranhão	Maranhão	Santa Catarina	Figueirense
Mato Grosso	Operário (VG)	São Paulo	Palmeiras
Mato Grosso do Sul	Comercial	Sergipe	Sergipe
Minas Gerais	Cruzeiro	Tocantins	União Araguainense
Pará	Remo		

== Youth competition champions ==
Competition	Champion
Copa Macaé de Juvenis	Cruzeiro
Copa Santiago de Futebol Juvenil	Nacional (Uruguay)
Copa São Paulo de Juniores	Guarani
Taça Belo Horizonte de Juniores	Vitória

== Other competition champions ==
Competition	Champion
Campeonato do Nordeste	Sport Recife
Copa Pernambuco	Ypiranga
Copa Rio	Volta Redonda

== Brazilian clubs in international competitions ==
Team	Copa Libertadores 1994	Supercopa Sudamericana 1994	Copa CONMEBOL 1994	Recopa Sudamericana 1994
Botafogo	Did not qualify	Did not qualify	Round of 16	Runner-up
Corinthians	Did not qualify	Did not qualify	Semifinals	N/A
Cruzeiro	Round of 16	Semifinals	Did not qualify	N/A
Flamengo	Did not qualify	Round of 16	Did not qualify	N/A
Grêmio	Did not qualify	Quarterfinals	Round of 16	N/A
Palmeiras	Round of 16	Did not qualify	Did not qualify	N/A
Santos	Did not qualify	Round of 16	Did not qualify	N/A
São Paulo	Runner-up	Semifinals	Champions	Champions
Vitória	Did not qualify	Did not qualify	Round of 16	N/A

== Brazil national team ==
The following table lists all the games played by the Brazil national football team in official competitions and friendly matches during 1994.

Date	Opposition	Result	Score	Brazil scorers	Competition
March 23, 1994	Argentina	W	2-0	Bebeto (2)	International Friendly
April 20, 1994	(France) Paris Saint-Germain/Bordeaux Combined Team	D	0-0	-	International Friendly (unofficial match)
May 4, 1994	Iceland	W	3-0	Ronaldo, Zinho, Viola	International Friendly
June 5, 1994	Canada	D	1-1	Romário	International Friendly
June 8, 1994	Honduras	W	8-2	Romário (3), Bebeto (2), Cafu, Dunga, Raí	International Friendly
June 12, 1994	El Salvador	W	4-0	Romário, Bebeto, Zinho, Raí	International Friendly
June 20, 1994	Russia	W	2-0	Romário, Raí	World Cup
June 24, 1994	Cameroon	W	3-0	Romário, Márcio Santos, Bebeto	World Cup
June 28, 1994	Sweden	D	1-1	Romário	World Cup
July 4, 1994	United States	W	1-0	Bebeto	World Cup
July 9, 1994	Netherlands	W	3-2	Romário, Bebeto, Branco	World Cup
July 13, 1994	Sweden	W	1-0	Romário	World Cup
July 17, 1994	Italy	D	0-0 (3-2 pen)	-	World Cup
December 23, 1994	FR Yugoslavia	W	2-0	Viola, Branco	International Friendly

== Women's football ==
=== National team ===
The Brazil women's national football team did not play any matches in 1994.

=== Domestic competition champions ===
Competition	Champion
Campeonato Brasileiro	Vasco
