= Grêmio Esportivo Novorizontino =

Novorizontino
- Full name: Grêmio Esportivo Novorizontino
- Nickname: Tigre do Vale
- Founded: March 13, 1973
- Dissolved: 1999
- Ground: Jorge Ismael de Biasi
- Capacity: 16,000
Home colours	Away colours

Grêmio Esportivo Novorizontino, usually known simply as Novorizontino was a Brazilian football club from Novo Horizonte, São Paulo state.

== History ==
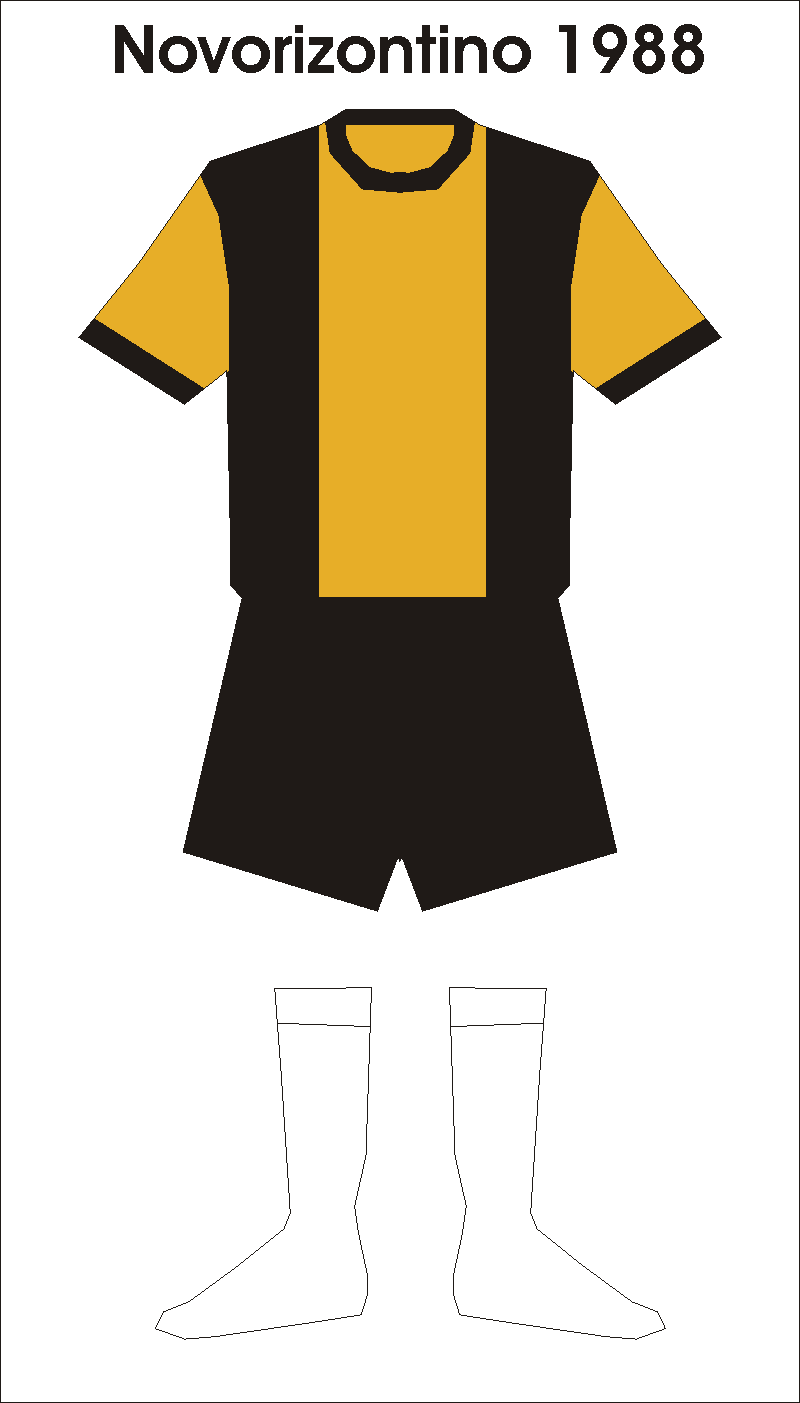
1988 Novorizontino home kit.

On March 11, 1973, the club was founded as Pima Futebol Clube, named after shoe factory Pima. The club was founded to compete in a Catanduva city amateur competition called Liga Catanduvense.

In 1974 and 1975, Pima won the Liga Catanduvense.

In 1976, Pima professionalized its football section and the club was renamed to Grêmio Esportivo Novorizontino. In that year, the club joined the Campeonato Paulista Third Division, and competed in its first official matches.

In 1990, Novorizontino reached the Campeonato Paulista final, against Bragantino, beating clubs like Palmeiras, Guarani and Portuguesa. The final, nicknamed caipira final (final caipira, in Portuguese language), after two draws, was won by Bragantino, due to Bragantino's better campaign.

In 1994, Novorizontino won its only national title, the Campeonato Brasileiro Third Division, after beating Ferroviária in the final. The club was promoted to the following year's second division.

In 1994, the Chedid family assumed the control of the club's football section.

In 1996, the club did not compete the Campeonato Brasileiro Second Division due to a financial crisis.

On April 26, 1998, Novorizontino played in its final professional match, against Paraguaçuense at Estádio Municipal Carlos Afine, Paraguaçu Paulista. Paraguaçuense won this Campeonato Paulista A-2 (which is the Campeonato Paulista Second Division) match 4–0

In 1999, deeply in debt, the club did not pay the Paulista Football Federation fee, so the club was not allowed to compete in the São Paulo state championship, and then its football section was closed.

== Honours ==
=== Official tournaments ===
National
Competitions	Titles	Seasons
Campeonato Brasileiro Série C	1	1994

=== Runners-up ===
- Campeonato Paulista (1): 1990
- Campeonato Paulista Série A2 (1): 1985
- Campeonato Paulista Série A3 (1): 1981

== Famous coaches ==
- (Brazil) Nelsinho Baptista

== Stadium ==
Novorizontino's home matches were usually played at Doutor Jorge Ismael de Biasi, which has a maximum capacity of 16,000 people.

== Club colors ==
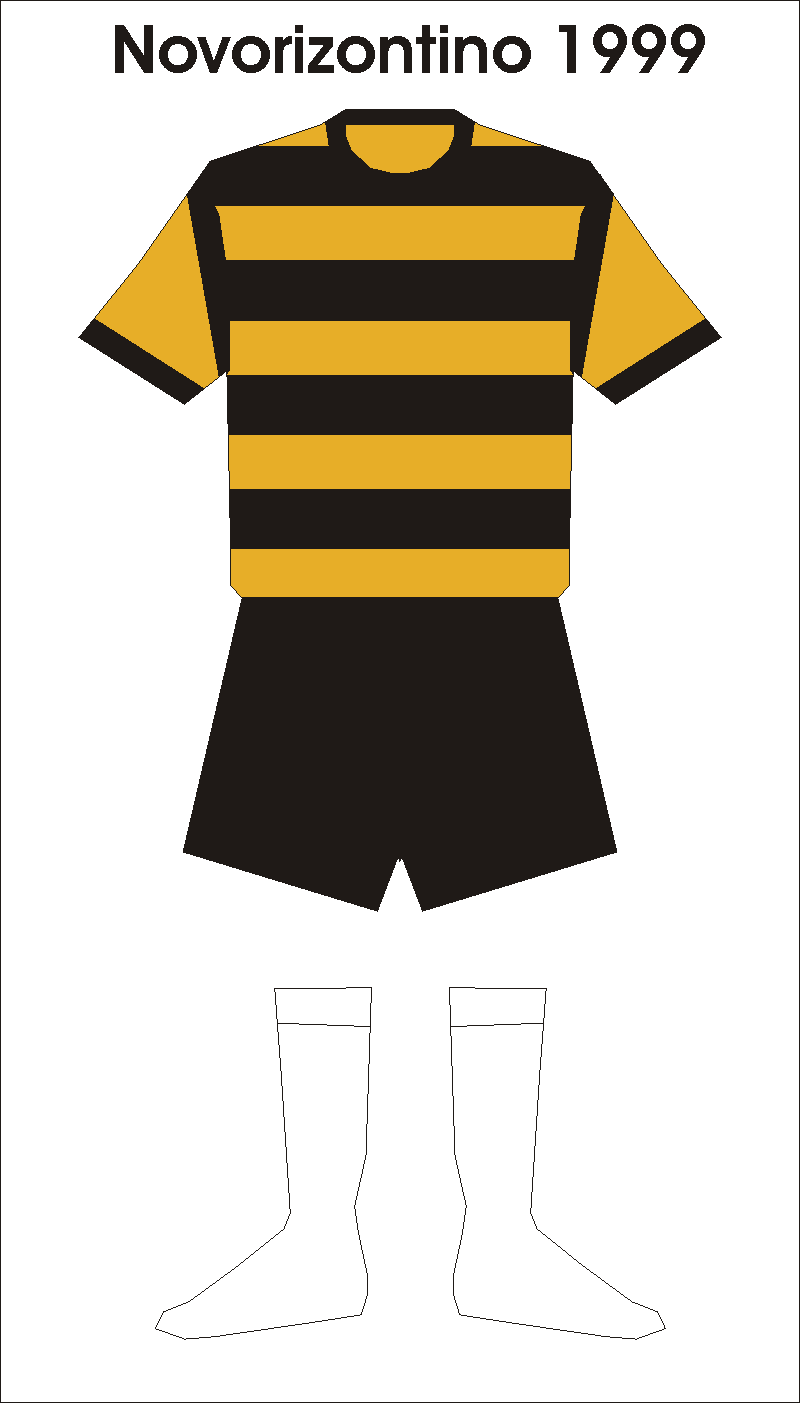
1999 Novorizontino home kit.

The club colors were yellow and black, which were the same of Pima factory ones.

== Nickname ==
Novorizontino is nicknamed Aurinegro, meaning golden-black.

== Mascot ==
The club's mascot was a tiger, called Tigre do Vale (meaning Tiger of the Valley). The tiger was chosen as mascot because its colors are yellow and black.
