= 1992 in Brazilian football =

Football in Brazil
- Season: 1992

The following article presents a summary of the 1992 football (soccer) season in Brazil, which was the 91st season of competitive football in the country.

== Campeonato Brasileiro Série A ==
Second phase

Group 1
Pos	Team	Pld	W	D	L	GF	GA	GD	Pts	Qualification
1	Flamengo	6	3	1	2	7	5	+2	7	Finalist
2	Vasco	6	1	4	1	10	9	+1	6	
3	São Paulo	6	2	2	2	6	7	−1	6	
4	Santos	6	1	3	2	7	9	−2	5	

Group 2
Pos	Team	Pld	W	D	L	GF	GA	GD	Pts	Qualification
1	Botafogo	6	4	1	1	7	4	+3	9	Finalist
2	Bragantino	6	3	2	1	6	4	+2	8	
3	Corinthians	6	2	1	3	8	7	+1	5	
4	Cruzeiro	6	1	0	5	5	11	−6	2	

Final

July 12, 1992

Flamengo	3–0	Botafogo

Maracanã

July 19, 1992

Botafogo	2–2	Flamengo

Maracanã

Flamengo declared as the Campeonato Brasileiro champions by aggregate score of 5-2.

=== Relegation ===
No club was relegated to the following year's second level.

== Campeonato Brasileiro Série B ==
Semifinals

Team 1	Agg.	Team 2	1st leg	2nd leg
Santa Cruz	2-4	Paraná	1-2	1-2
Criciúma	3-4	Vitória	2-1	1-3

Final

July 5, 1992

Paraná	2–1	Vitória

July 11, 1992

Vitória	0–1	Paraná

Paraná declared as the Campeonato Brasileiro Série B champions by aggregate score of 3-1.

=== Promotion ===
The three best placed teams in each one of the four groups in the first stage, which are Santa Cruz, Fortaleza, Ceará, Remo, Vitória, Desportiva, Criciúma, Coritiba, União São João, América-MG, Paraná and Grêmio, were promoted to the following year's first level.

== Campeonato Brasileiro Série C ==
Final

June 7, 1992

Fluminense-BA	2–0	Tuna Luso

June 13, 1992

Tuna Luso	3–1	Fluminense-BA

Tuna Luso declared as the Campeonato Brasileiro Série C champions by aggregate score of 3-3.

=== Promotion ===
The winners of the seven groups of the first phase, Nacional-AM, Tuna Luso, Auto Esporte-PB, Fluminense de Feira, Rio Pardo, Matsubara and Operário-PR, would be promoted to 1993 Série B, but the Série B of that year was not held, so those promotions were not respected.

== Copa do Brasil ==
The Copa do Brasil final was played between Internacional and Fluminense.

December 10, 1992

Fluminense	2–1	Internacional

Laranjeiras

December 13, 1992

Internacional	1–0	Fluminense

Beira-Rio

Internacional declared as the cup champions on the away goal rule by aggregate score of 2-2.

== State championship champions ==
State	Champion	State	Champion
Acre	Rio Branco	Paraíba	Auto Esporte
Alagoas	CRB	Paraná	Londrina
Amapá	Ypiranga	Pernambuco	Sport Recife
Amazonas	Sul América	Piauí	4 de Julho
Bahia	Vitória	Rio de Janeiro	Vasco
Ceará	Fortaleza; Ceará; Tiradentes-CE; Icasa^{(1)}	Rio Grande do Norte	América-RN
Distrito Federal	Taguatinga	Rio Grande do Sul	Internacional
Espírito Santo	Desportiva	Rondônia	Ji-Paraná
Goiás	Goiatuba	Roraima	São Raimundo-RR
Maranhão	Sampaio Corrêa	Santa Catarina	Brusque
Mato Grosso	Sorriso	São Paulo	São Paulo
Mato Grosso do Sul	Nova Andradina	Sergipe	Sergipe
Minas Gerais	Cruzeiro	Tocantins	-
Pará	Paysandu		

^{(1)}Four clubs, which are Fortaleza, Ceará, Tiradentes-CE and Icasa, shared the 1992 Ceará State Championship title.

== Youth competition champions ==
Competition	Champion
Copa Santiago de Futebol Juvenil	Internacional
Copa São Paulo de Juniores	Vasco
Taça Belo Horizonte de Juniores	Vasco

== Other competition champions ==
Competition	Champion
Copa Rio	Vasco
Copa Santa Catarina	Brusque

== Brazilian clubs in international competitions ==
Team	Copa Libertadores 1992	Supercopa Sudamericana 1992	Copa CONMEBOL 1992	Recopa Sudamericana 1992	Intercontinental Cup 1992
Atlético Mineiro	Did not qualify	Did not qualify	Champions	N/A	N/A
Bragantino	Did not qualify	Did not qualify	Round of 16	N/A	N/A
Criciúma	Quarterfinals	Did not qualify	Did not qualify	N/A	N/A
Cruzeiro	Did not qualify	Champions	Did not qualify	Runner-up	N/A
Flamengo	Did not qualify	Semifinals	Did not qualify	N/A	N/A
Fluminense	Did not qualify	Did not qualify	Round of 16	N/A	N/A
Grêmio	Did not qualify	Round of 16	Quarterfinals	N/A	N/A
Santos	Did not qualify	Round of 16	Did not qualify	N/A	N/A
São Paulo	Champions	Quarterfinals	Did not qualify	N/A	Champions

== Brazil national team ==
The following table lists all the games played by the Brazil national football team in official competitions and friendly matches during 1992.

Date	Opposition	Result	Score	Brazil scorers	Competition
February 26, 1992	United States	W	3-0	Antônio Carlos, Raí (2)	International Friendly
April 15, 1992	Finland	W	3-1	Bebeto (2), Paulo Sérgio	International Friendly
April 30, 1992	Uruguay	L	0-1	-	International Friendly
May 17, 1992	England	D	1-1	Bebeto	International Friendly
May 19, 1992	(Italy) Milan	W	1-0	Careca	International Friendly (unofficial match)
July 31, 1992	Mexico	W	5-0	Bebeto (2), Renato Gaúcho, Zinho, Paulo Sérgio	Friendship Cup
August 2, 1992	United States	W	1-0	Bebeto	Friendship Cup
August 26, 1992	France	W	2-0	Luiz Henrique, Raí	International Friendly
September 23, 1992	Costa Rica	W	4-2	Raí (3), Renato Gaúcho	International Friendly
November 25, 1992	Uruguay	L	1-2	Edmundo	International Friendly
December 16, 1992	Germany	W	3-1	Luiz Henrique, Bebeto, Jorginho	International Friendly

== Women's football ==
=== National team ===
The Brazil women's national football team did not play any matches in 1992.
