= 1993 in Brazilian football =

Football in Brazil
- Season: 1993

The following article presents a summary of the 1993 football (soccer) season in Brazil, which was the 92nd season of competitive football in the country.

== Campeonato Brasileiro Série A ==
Second phase

Pos	Team	Pld	W	D	L	GF	GA	GD	Pts	Qualification
1	Vitória	6	2	4	0	11	9	+2	8	Qualified for the final
2	Corinthians	6	2	3	1	11	10	+1	7	
3	Santos	6	1	3	2	11	12	−1	5	
4	Flamengo	6	0	4	2	6	8	−2	4	

Pos	Team	Pld	W	D	L	GF	GA	GD	Pts	Qualification
1	Palmeiras	6	4	2	0	10	3	+7	10	Qualified for the final
2	São Paulo	6	4	1	1	8	5	+3	9	
3	Guarani	6	1	1	4	12	12	0	3	
4	Remo	6	0	2	4	4	14	−10	2	

Final

December 12, 1993

Vitória	0–1	Palmeiras

Fonte Nova

December 19, 1993

Palmeiras	2–0	Vitória

Morumbi

Palmeiras declared as the Campeonato Brasileiro champions by aggregate score of 3–0.

=== Relegation ===
The four worst placed teams in each one of the groups C and D in the first stage, which are Ceará, Santa Cruz, Goiás, Fortaleza, América-MG, Coritiba, Atlético Paranaense and Desportiva, were relegated to the following year's second level.

== Copa do Brasil ==
The Copa do Brasil final was played between Cruzeiro and Grêmio.

May 30, 1993

Grêmio	0–0	Cruzeiro

Olímpico

June 3, 1993

Cruzeiro	2–1	Grêmio

Mineirão

Cruzeiro declared as the cup champions by aggregate score of 2–1.

== State championship champions ==
State	Champion	State	Champion
Acre	Independênca	Paraíba	Campinense
Alagoas	CRB	Paraná	Paraná
Amapá	São José-AP	Pernambuco	Santa Cruz
Amazonas	Sul América	Piauí	4 de Julho
Bahia	Bahia	Rio de Janeiro	Vasco
Ceará	Ceará	Rio Grande do Norte	ABC
Distrito Federal	Taguatinga	Rio Grande do Sul	Grêmio
Espírito Santo	Linhares EC	Rondônia	Ariquemes
Goiás	Vila Nova	Roraima	Atlético Roraima
Maranhão	Maranhão	Santa Catarina	Criciúma
Mato Grosso	Sorriso	São Paulo	Palmeiras
Mato Grosso do Sul	Comercial	Sergipe	Sergipe
Minas Gerais	América-MG	Tocantins	Tocantinópolis
Pará	Remo		

== Youth competition champions ==
Competition	Champion
Copa Santiago de Futebol Juvenil	Internacional
Copa São Paulo de Juniores	São Paulo
Taça Belo Horizonte de Juniores	Cruzeiro

== Other competition champions ==
Competition	Champion
Copa Rio	Vasco
Copa Santa Catarina	Criciúma
Torneio Ricardo Teixeira	Mogi Mirim
Torneio Rio-São Paulo	Palmeiras

== Brazilian clubs in international competitions ==
Team	Copa Libertadores 1993	Supercopa Sudamericana 1993	Copa CONMEBOL 1993	Recopa Sudamericana 1993	Intercontinental Cup 1993
Atlético Mineiro	Did not qualify	Did not qualify	Semifinals	N/A	N/A
Botafogo	Did not qualify	Did not qualify	Champions	N/A	N/A
Bragantino	Did not qualify	Did not qualify	Round of 16	N/A	N/A
Cruzeiro	Did not qualify	Quarterfinals	Did not qualify	Runner-up	N/A
Flamengo	Quarterfinals	Runner-up	Did not qualify	N/A	N/A
Fluminense	Did not qualify	Did not qualify	Round of 16	N/A	N/A
Grêmio	Did not qualify	Quarterfinals	Did not qualify	N/A	N/A
Internacional	Group stage	Did not qualify	Did not qualify	N/A	N/A
Santos	Did not qualify	Round of 16	Did not qualify	N/A	N/A
São Paulo	Champions	Champions	Did not qualify	Champions	Champions
Vasco	Did not qualify	Did not qualify	Round of 16	N/A	N/A

== Brazil national team ==
The following table lists all the games played by the Brazil national football team in official competitions and friendly matches during 1993.

Date	Opposition	Result	Score	Brazil scorers	Competition
February 18, 1993	Argentina	D	1-1	Luiz Henrique	International Friendly
March 17, 1993	Poland	D	2-2	Świerczewski (own goal), Müller	International Friendly
June 6, 1993	United States	W	2-0	Careca, Luiz Carlos Winck	U.S. Cup
June 10, 1993	Germany	D	3-3	Helmer (own goal), Luizinho, Careca	U.S. Cup
June 13, 1993	England	D	1-1	Márcio Santos	U.S. Cup
June 18, 1993	Peru	D	0-0	-	Copa América
June 21, 1993	Chile	L	2-3	Müller, Palhinha	Copa América
June 24, 1993	Paraguay	W	3-0	Palhinha (2), Edmundo	Copa América
June 27, 1993	Argentina	D	1-1 (5-6 pen)	Müller	Copa América
July 14, 1993	Paraguay	W	2-0	Branco, Bebeto	International Friendly
July 18, 1993	Ecuador	D	0-0	-	World Cup Qualifying
July 25, 1993	Bolivia	L	0-2	-	World Cup Qualifying
August 1, 1993	Venezuela	W	5-1	Raí, Bebeto (2), Branco, Palhinha	World Cup Qualifying
August 8, 1993	Mexico	D	1-1	Márcio Santos	International Friendly
August 15, 1993	Uruguay	D	1-1	Raí	World Cup Qualifying
August 22, 1993	Ecuador	W	2-0	Bebeto, Dunga	World Cup Qualifying
August 29, 1993	Bolivia	W	6-0	Raí, Bebeto (2), Müller, Branco, Ricardo Gomes	World Cup Qualifying
September 5, 1993	Venezuela	W	4-0	Ricardo Gomes (2), Palhinha, Evair	World Cup Qualifying
September 19, 1993	Uruguay	W	2-0	Romário (2)	World Cup Qualifying
November 17, 1993	Germany	L	1-2	Evair	International Friendly
December 16, 1993	Mexico	W	1-0	Rivaldo	International Friendly

== Women's football ==
=== National team ===
The Brazil women's national football team did not play any matches in 1993.
