= 1991 Santos FC season =

Santos
1991 season
- President: Antônio de Aguiar Filho
- Manager: Cabralzinho; Ramiro Valente; Écio Pasca
- Campeonato Brasileiro: 8th
- Campeonato Paulista: First stage
- Supercopa Libertadores: Quarterfinals
- Top goalscorer: League: Paulinho McLaren (15); All: Paulinho McLaren (20)

The 1991 season was Santos FC's seventy-ninth season in existence and club's thirty-second in the top flight of Brazilian football since Brasileirão era.

== Players ==
=== Squad ===
Note: Flags indicate national team as defined under FIFA eligibility rules; some limited exceptions apply. Players may hold more than one non-FIFA nationality.

No.	Pos.	Nation	Player
—	GK	BRA	Sérgio Guedes
—	GK	BRA	Nilton
—	GK	BRA	Edinho
—	DF	BRA	Camilo
—	DF	USA	Desmond Armstrong
—	DF	BRA	Flavinho
—	DF	BRA	Índio
—	DF	BRA	Luiz Carlos
—	DF	BRA	Marcelo Veiga
—	DF	BRA	Pedro Paulo
—	DF	BRA	Rogerio
—	MF	BRA	Axel
—	MF	BRA	Carlinhos
—	MF	BRA	Cassinho
—	MF	BRA	César Sampaio

No.	Pos.	Nation	Player
—	MF	BRA	Edu Marangon
—	MF	BRA	Luiz Cláudio
—	MF	BRA	Marcelo Paulino
—	MF	BRA	Mendonça
—	MF	BRA	Sérgio Manoel
—	MF	BRA	Sérgio Santos
—	MF	BRA	Zé Renato
—	FW	BRA	Almir
—	FW	BRA	Essinho
—	FW	BRA	Gláucio
—	FW	BRA	Luizinho
—	FW	BRA	Marcos Lira
—	FW	BRA	Moysés
—	FW	BRA	Paulinho McLaren

Source: Acervo Santista

==== Appearances and goals ====
Pos.	Nat	Name	Brasileiro		Paulista		Supercopa		Total	
Pos.	Nat	Name	Apps	Goals	Apps	Goals	Apps	Goals	Apps	Goals
GK	(Brazil)	Nilton	1	0	6	0	3	0	10	0
GK	(Brazil)	Sérgio Guedes	18	0	20	0	1	0	39	0
DF	(Brazil)	Camilo	10 (4)	0	4	0	1 (1)	0	20	0
DF	(United States)	Desmond Armstrong	1	0	0	0	0	0	1	0
DF	(Brazil)	Flavinho	16	0	9 (2)	0	2	0	29	0
DF	(Brazil)	Índio	10	0	26	2	4	0	40	2
DF	(Brazil)	Lico	0	0	0 (1)	0	0 (1)	0	2	0
DF	(Brazil)	Luiz Carlos	10	1	20	0	2	0	32	1
DF	(Brazil)	Marcelo Fernandes	0	0	1 (1)	0	0	0	2	0
DF	(Brazil)	Marcelo Veiga	8 (2)	0	16	0	2	0	28	0
DF	(Brazil)	Pedro Paulo	17	0	24	1	4	2	45	3
DF	(Brazil)	Rogerio	1	0	6 (6)	0	1	0	14	0
MF	(Brazil)	Axel	5 (7)	0	21	1	1 (1)	0	35	1
MF	(Brazil)	Carlinhos	0	0	4 (6)	1	2 (1)	0	13	1
MF	(Brazil)	Cassinho	0	0	1	0	0	0	1	0
MF	(Brazil)	César Sampaio	17	1	0	0	0	0	17	1
MF	(Brazil)	Edu Marangon	14	2	0	0	0	0	14	2
MF	(Brazil)	Marcelo Passos	0	0	1 (3)	0	0	0	4	0
MF	(Brazil)	Mendonça	1 (2)	0	0	0	0	0	3	0
MF	(Brazil)	Ranielli	0	0	3	0	0	0	3	0
MF	(Brazil)	Serginho Fraldinha	0	0	10 (10)	2	1 (2)	1	23	3
MF	(Brazil)	Sérgio Manoel	14	1	20 (2)	0	4	0	40	1
MF	(Brazil)	Sérgio Santos	6 (4)	1	7 (5)	0	1	0	23	1
MF	(Brazil)	Zé Renato	17 (1)	0	21 (2)	5	3 (1)	0	45	5
FW	(Brazil)	Almir	17	2	20 (1)	2	4	0	42	4
FW	(Brazil)	Edmílson	0	0	0 (1)	0	0	0	1	0
FW	(Brazil)	Glaúcio	6 (5)	0	0	0	0	0	11	0
FW	(Brazil)	Luizinho	1 (1)	0	6 (4)	1	1	0	14	1
FW	(Brazil)	Marcos Lira	1	0	0	0	0	0	1	0
FW	(Brazil)	Moysés	2	0	0	0	0	0	2	0
FW	(Brazil)	Paulinho McLaren	16	15	23	4	4	1	43	20
FW	(Brazil)	Tato	0	0	16 (1)	2	3 (1)	0	21	2
FW	(Brazil)	Whelliton	0	0	1	0	0	0	1	0

Source: Match reports in Competitive matches

==== Goalscorers ====
Ran	Pos	Nat	Name	Brasileiro	Paulistão	Supercopa	Total
1	FW	(Brazil)	Paulinho McLaren	15	4	1	20
2	MF	(Brazil)	Zé Renato	0	5	0	5
3	FW	(Brazil)	Almir	2	2	0	4
4	DF	(Brazil)	Pedro Paulo	0	1	2	3
4	MF	(Brazil)	Serginho Fraldinha	0	2	1	3
5	MF	(Brazil)	Edu Marangon	2	0	0	2
5	DF	(Brazil)	Índio	0	2	0	2
5	FW	(Brazil)	Tato	0	2	0	2
6	MF	(Brazil)	Axel	0	1	0	1
6	MF	(Brazil)	Carlinhos	0	1	0	1
6	MF	(Brazil)	César Sampaio	1	0	0	1
6	DF	(Brazil)	Luiz Carlos	1	0	0	1
6	FW	(Brazil)	Luizinho	0	1	0	1
6	MF	(Brazil)	Sérgio Manoel	1	0	0	1
6	MF	(Brazil)	Sérgio Santos	1	0	0	1

== Transfers ==
=== In ===
Pos.	Name	Moving from	Source	Notes
GK	(Brazil) Edinho	Free agent		
FW	(Brazil) Luizinho	Nacional–SP		
FW	(Brazil) Marcos Lira	Paraguaçuense		
ST	(Brazil) Moysés	Oeste		
FW	(Brazil) Almir	Grêmio		
FW	(Brazil) Gláucio	Barretos		
MF	(Brazil) Mendonça	Maringá		
MF	(Brazil) Cassinho	Olímpia		
CB	(United States) Desmond Armstrong	Baltimore Blast (United States)		
CB	(Brazil) Rogerio	Youth system		
MF	(Brazil) Edmílson	Central Brasileira		
FW	(Brazil) Tato	Sport Recife		
MF	(Brazil) Serginho Fraldinha	Palmeiras		
MF	(Brazil) Ranielli	Palmeiras		
RB	(Brazil) Lico	Paulistano de São Roque		On loan
GK	(Brazil) Robson	Jabaquara		Loan return
MF	(Brazil) Marcelo Passos	Jabaquara		Loan return
FW	(Brazil) Whelliton	Jabaquara		Loan return
CB	(Brazil) Marcelo Fernandes	Portuguesa Santista		
MF	(Brazil) Carlinhos	Youth system		

=== Out ===
Pos.	Name	Moving to	Source	Notes
DF	(Brazil) Amaral	Free agent		
GK	(Brazil) Pizelli	Free agent		
FW	(Brazil) Mendonça	Free agent		
MF	(Brazil) Derval	Free agent		
FW	(Brazil) Édson Ampola	Free agent		
FW	(Brazil) Ney Bala	São Paulo		Loan return
DF	(Brazil) Careca	Caxias		
ST	(Brazil) Serginho Chulapa	Portuguesa Santista		
CB	(Brazil) Cássio	Olímpia		
MF	(Brazil) Marco Antônio Cipó	Olímpia		
FW	(Brazil) Loca	Maringá		On loan
FW	(Brazil) Marquinhos	Maringá		
RB	(Brazil) Ijuí	São Bento		
MF	(Brazil) Zé Humberto	Barretos		
MF	(Brazil) César Ferreira	Olímpia		
ST	(Brazil) Essinho	Olímpia		On loan
DF	(Brazil) França	Olímpia		On loan
ST	(Brazil) Moysés	Barretos		On loan
GK	(Brazil) Robson	Jabaquara		On loan
MF	(Brazil) Marcelo Passos	Jabaquara		On loan
FW	(Brazil) Whelliton	Jabaquara		On loan
FW	(Brazil) Marcos Lira	Portuguesa Santista		On loan
FW	(Brazil) Loca	Tupã		On loan
DF	(Brazil) Maurício Copertino	Tupã		On loan
FW	(Brazil) Nilton	Tupã		On loan
MF	(Brazil) Luiz Cláudio	Ituano		On loan
FW	(Brazil) Paulo Leme	Free agent		
CB	(United States) Desmond Armstrong	Maryland Bays (United States)		
FW	(Brazil) Gláucio	Paulista		On loan
MF	(Brazil) Edu Marangon	Palmeiras		
MF	(Brazil) César Sampaio	Palmeiras		
MF	(Brazil) Mendonça	Noroeste		On loan
RB	(Brazil) Ijuí	Noroeste		On loan
MF	(Brazil) Marcelo Paulino	Portuguesa Santista		
MF	(Brazil) Luiz Cláudio	Portuguesa Santista		

== Friendlies ==
27 January Friendly	Maringá	1 – 1	Santos	Maringá
	Mendonça 9'	Report	59' Axel	Stadium: Willie Davids; Attendance: 2,150; Referee: Dirceu Oscar de Matos

27 February Friendly	Francana	0 – 1	Santos	Franca
		Report	38' Edu Marangon	Stadium: Lancha Filho; Attendance: 5,200; Referee: Joaquim Carlos Caetano

2 March Friendly	Portuguesa Santista	0 – 0	Santos	Santos
		Report		Stadium: Ulrico Mursa; Attendance: 1,633; Referee: Paulo Eduardo Pereira Barjas

21 April Friendly	Tupã	0 – 0	Santos	Tupã
		Report		Stadium: Alonso Carvalho Braga; Referee: José Carlos Schiavo

17 May Friendly	Pires do Rio	1 – 1	Santos	Pires do Rio
	Danilo 31'	Report	21' Paulinho McLaren	Stadium: Edson Monteiro de Godoy

28 May Ecuador International Tournament	Independiente (Argentina)	0 – 1	(Brazil) Santos	Guayaquil
		Report	66' Paulinho McLaren	Stadium: George Capwell; Attendance: 15,000; Referee: José Orellana

31 May Ecuador International Tournament	Emelec (Ecuador)	1 – 0	(Brazil) Santos	Guayaquil
	Cangá 50'	Report		Stadium: George Capwell; Attendance: 28,000; Referee: Juan de Santis

16 June Friendly	SE Guarujá	0 – 4	Santos	Guarujá
		Report	30' Zé Renato; 32' Luiz Carlos; 43' Índio; 85' Luizinho	Stadium: Antonio Fernandes; Referee: Dulcídio Wanderley Boschilia

23 June Friendly	Bolivia	2 – 3	(Brazil) Santos	La Paz
	Suárez 25'; Peña 77'	Report	48' Axel; 62' Almir; 64' Carlinhos	Stadium: Hernando Siles; Attendance: 13,087; Referee: Armando Aliaga

4 July Friendly	Palmeiras FC	0 – 0	Santos	São João da Boa Vista
		Report		Stadium: Octávio da Silva Bastos; Attendance: 4,000; Referee: Silas Santana

7 July Friendly	Paulistano de São Roque	0 – 1	Santos	São Roque
		Report	5' Luiz Carlos	Stadium: Quintino de Lima; Attendance: 1,400; Referee: Modesto Salviato

12 November Friendly	América (Mexico)	2 – 1	(Brazil) Santos	Mexico City
	Edu Manga 13'; Zaguinho 64'	Report	70' (pen.) Paulinho McLaren	Stadium: Azteca; Attendance: 13,087; Referee: Alfredo Gasso Pérez

15 November Friendly	Guairense	1 – 1	Santos	Guaíra
	Camarão 53'	Report	85' Zé Renato	Stadium: José Zuquim Nogueira; Referee: Vandro Luis Silveira

17 November Friendly	Palmeiras de Franca	0 – 0	Santos	Franca
		Report		Stadium: Lancha Filho; Referee: Modesto Salvati Filho

5 December Friendly	Jabaquara	0 – 2	Santos	Santos
		Report	47' Serginho Fraldinha; 54' Sérgio Manoel	Stadium: Espanha; Attendance: 632; Referee: Edmir Antônio Cordeiro

8 December Friendly	Vila das Palmeiras	1 – 0	Santos	Guarulhos
	Júnior 62'	Report		Attendance: 2,500; Referee: Renato Giglio

== Competitions ==
=== Campeonato Brasileiro ===
==== Results summary ====
Overall								Home						Away					
Pld	W	D	L	GF	GA	GAv	Pts	W	D	L	GF	GA	Pts	W	D	L	GF	GA	Pts
19	7	5	7	23	20	1.15	19	5	4	0	16	4	14	2	1	7	7	16	5

==== First stage ====
Pos	Team	Pld	W	D	L	GF	GA	GD	Pts
6	Palmeiras	19	7	8	4	20	19	+1	22
7	Internacional	19	5	10	4	19	16	+3	20
8	Santos	19	7	5	7	23	20	+3	19
9	Flamengo	19	7	5	7	20	24	−4	19
10	Portuguesa	19	5	9	5	14	15	−1	19

===== Matches =====
2 February 1	Santos	0 – 0	Vasco da Gama	Santos
16:00		Report		Stadium: Vila Belmiro; Attendance: 3,234; Referee: Manuel Serapião Filho

6 February 2	Náutico	2 – 0	Santos	Recife
21:00	Newton 42'; Barros 65'	Report		Stadium: Aflitos; Attendance: 2,868; Referee: Édson Rezende de Oliveira

17 February 3	São Paulo	1 – 2	Santos	São Paulo
16:00	Raí 8'	Report	59', 73' Paulinho McLaren	Stadium: Morumbi; Attendance: 8,863; Referee: Flávio de Carvalho

25 February 4	Santos	3 – 1	Sport Recife	Santos
21:30	Paulinho McLaren 41'; Luiz Carlos 68'; Sérgio Santos 87'	Report	29' Hélio	Stadium: Vila Belmiro; Attendance: 6,623; Referee: José Roberto Wright

6 March 5	Corinthians	2 – 0	Santos	São Paulo
20:30	Mirandinha 17'; Neto 52'	Report		Stadium: Pacaembu; Attendance: 17,761; Referee: José Aparecido de Oliveira

10 March 6	Flamengo	1 – 0	Santos	Niterói
15:30	Nélio 34'	Report		Stadium: Caio Martins; Attendance: 5,862; Referee: Manoel Serapião Filho

14 March 7	Santos	1 – 1	Portuguesa	Santos
21:35	Edu Marangon 40'	Report	78' Vladimir	Stadium: Vila Belmiro; Attendance: 7,469; Referee: Edmundo Lima Filho

18 March 8	Santos	2 – 0	Vitória	Santos
21:35	César Sampaio 2'; Paulinho McLaren 49'	Report		Stadium: Vila Belmiro; Attendance: 5,383; Referee: Cláudio Vinícius Cerdeira

23 March 9	Botafogo	0 – 3	Santos	Rio de Janeiro
16:00		Report	5', 19', 45' (pen.) Paulinho McLaren	Stadium: Maracanã; Attendance: 14,483; Referee: Renato Marsiglia

30 March 10	Internacional	1 – 1	Santos	Porto Alegre
16:00	Lima 79'	Report	52' Paulinho McLaren	Stadium: Beira-Rio; Attendance: 16,156; Referee: Dalmo Bozzano

3 April 11	Santos	1 – 1	Fluminense	Santos
21:30	Paulinho McLaren 21' (pen.)	Report	43' Renato Carioca	Stadium: Vila Belmiro; Attendance: 10,220; Referee: Manoel Serapião Filho

8 April 12	Santos	4 – 0	Cruzeiro	Santos
21:35	Edu Marangon 16'; Almir 25'; Sérgio Manoel 44'; Paulinho McLaren 86'	Report		Stadium: Vila Belmiro; Attendance: 10,717; Referee: Cláudio Gonçalves Garcia

14 April 13	Bragantino	1 – 0	Santos	Bragança Paulista
16:00	João Santos 45'	Report		Stadium: Marcelo Stéfani; Attendance: 8,890; Referee: Edmundo Lima Filho

18 April 14	Santos	1 – 0	Grêmio	Santos
21:35	Paulinho McLaren 68'	Report		Stadium: Vila Belmiro; Attendance: 5,841; Referee: Pedro Carlos Bregalda

24 April 15	Bahia	1 – 0	Santos	Salvador
21:30	Jorginho Baiano 50'	Report		Stadium: Fonte Nova; Attendance: 10,910; Referee: José Mocellin

2 May 16	Santos	1 – 1	Palmeiras	Santos
21:35	Paulinho McLaren 77'	Report	66' Toninho	Stadium: Vila Belmiro; Attendance: 15,703; Referee: Ílton José da Costa

6 May 17	Atlético Mineiro	4 – 1	Santos	Belo Horizonte
21:30	Edu Lima 5'; Paulo Roberto 22'; Alfinete 57'; Fernando 80'	Report	35' Paulinho McLaren	Stadium: Mineirão; Attendance: 41,501; Referee: Cláudio Vinícius Cerdeira

9 May 18	Santos	3 – 0	Atlético Paranaense	Santos
21:35	Paulinho McLaren 16', 63'; Almir 31'	Report		Stadium: Vila Belmiro; Attendance: 2,044; Referee: Léo Feldman

19 May 19	Goiás	3 – 0	Santos	Goiânia
17:00	Cacau 34', 82'; Túlio 42'	Report		Stadium: Serra Dourada; Attendance: 6,560; Referee: Tolistói Batista

=== Campeonato Paulista ===
==== Results summary ====
Overall								Home						Away					
Pld	W	D	L	GF	GA	GAv	Pts	W	D	L	GF	GA	Pts	W	D	L	GF	GA	Pts
26	7	13	6	21	15	1.4	27	5	5	3	15	7	15	2	8	3	6	8	12

==== First stage ====
Pos	Team	Pld	W	D	L	GF	GA	GD	Pts	Qualification or relegation
5	Guarani	26	10	10	6	25	15	+10	30	Qualified
6	Bragantino	26	10	9	7	29	22	+7	29	
7	Santos	26	7	13	6	21	15	+6	27	
8	Ituano	26	9	8	9	22	29	−7	26	
9	América	26	5	14	7	15	21	−6	24	1992 Group B

Updated to match(es) played on November 3, 1991. Source: RSSSF.com
Rules for classification: 1) points; 2) wins; 3) goal difference; 4) number of goals scored.

===== Matches =====
24 July 1	Santos	1 – 1	Novorizontino	Santos
20:30	Índio 29'	Report	63' Edmilson	Stadium: Vila Belmiro; Attendance: 4,129; Referee: Ulisses Tavares da Silva

28 July 2	Guarani	0 – 0	Santos	Campinas
16:00		Report		Stadium: Brinco de Ouro; Attendance: 6,913; Referee: Oscar Roberto Godói

31 July 3	Ferroviária	0 – 0	Santos	Araraquara
20:30		Report		Stadium: Fonte Luminosa; Attendance: 4,106; Referee: Osvaldo dos Santos Ramos

3 August 4	Santos	0 – 1	Palmeiras	Santos
16:00		Report	86' Evair	Stadium: Vila Belmiro; Attendance: 8,735; Referee: José Roberto Wright

8 August 5	Santos	1 – 1	Bragantino	Santos
21:30	Paulinho McLaren 9'	Report	59' Sílvio	Stadium: Vila Belmiro; Attendance: 2,149; Referee: Edmundo Lima Filho

11 August 6	XV de Jaú	1 – 1	Santos	Jaú
16:00	Hamilton 35'	Report	84' Almir	Stadium: Zezinho Magalhães; Attendance: 2,149; Referee: Wilson Carlos dos Santos

14 August 7	Santos	2 – 0	América–SP	Santos
20:30	Paulinho McLaren 26', 86'	Report		Stadium: Vila Belmiro; Attendance: 2,536; Referee: Antonio de Pádua Sales

18 August 8	Corinthians	0 – 0	Santos	São Paulo
16:00		Report		Stadium: Pacaembu; Attendance: 26,245; Referee: Ílton José da Costa

22 August 9	Santos	2 – 0	Portuguesa	Santos
21:30	Zé Renato 36', 76'	Report		Stadium: Vila Belmiro; Attendance: 5,893; Referee: José Aparecido de Oliveira

25 August 10	XV de Piracicaba	1 – 2	Santos	Piracicaba
16:00	Celso Luis 48'	Report	68' Serginho Fraldinha; 83' Axel	Stadium: Barão da Serra Negra; Attendance: 6,465; Referee: Joaquim Carlos Caetano

31 August 11	Mogi Mirim	1 – 1	Santos	Mogi Mirim
16:00	Ronaldo 63'	Report	26' Tato	Stadium: Wilson de Barros; Attendance: 2,741; Referee: Flávio de Carvalho

4 September 12	Santos	1 – 1	Ituano	Santos
20:30	Índio 51'	Report	70' Vânder	Stadium: Vila Belmiro; Attendance: 5,390; Referee: Osvaldo dos Santos Ramos

8 September 13	Botafogo–SP	0 – 0	Santos	Ribeirão Preto
16:00		Report		Stadium: Santa Cruz; Attendance: 6,627; Referee: Edmundo Lima Filho

14 September 14	Bragantino	1 – 0	Santos	Bragança Paulista
16:00	Pintado 81'	Report		Stadium: Marcelo Stéfani; Attendance: 3,475; Referee: José Aparecido de Oliveira

18 September 15	Santos	3 – 0	Mogi Mirim	Santos
20:30	Zé Renato 38'; Luizinho 64'; Almir 70'	Report		Stadium: Vila Belmiro; Attendance: 3,039; Referee: João Roberto Wright

22 September 16	Novorizontino	0 – 1	Santos	Novo Horizonte
16:00		Report	73' Carlinhos	Stadium: Jorge Ismael de Biasi; Attendance: 3,255; Referee: Dagoberto Teixeira

29 September 17	Santos	0 – 0	Corinthians	São Paulo
16:00		Report		Stadium: Pacaembu; Attendance: 20,133; Referee: João Paulo Araújo

6 October 18	Portuguesa	0 – 0	Santos	São Paulo
16:00		Report		Stadium: Canindé; Attendance: 6,836; Referee: José Roberto Wright

8 October 19	Santos	0 – 1	Guarani	Santos
20:30		Report	40' Biro-Biro	Stadium: Vila Belmiro; Attendance: 3,817; Referee: José Aparecido de Oliveira

13 October 20	América–SP	1 – 1	Santos	São José do Rio Preto
16:00	Marinho 27'	Report	21' Tato	Stadium: Mário Alves Mendonça; Attendance: 3,840; Referee: Ílton José da Costa

18 October 21	Santos	1 – 2	XV de Jaú	Santos
20:30	Paulinho McLaren 57' (pen.)	Report	2' Hamilton; 82' Carlão	Stadium: Vila Belmiro; Attendance: 2,631; Referee: Paulo Eduardo Pereira Barjas

20 October 22	Palmeiras	1 – 0	Santos	São Paulo
16:00	Toninho 82'	Report		Stadium: Palestra Itália; Attendance: 19,534; Referee: Oswaldo dos Santos Ramos

24 October 23	Santos	3 – 0	XV de Piracicaba	São Paulo
20:30	Serginho Fraldinha 19'; Zé Renato 49'; Pedro Paulo 59'	Report		Stadium: Pacaembu; Attendance: 1,828; Referee: Antônio de Pádua Salles

26 October 24	Ituano	2 – 0	Santos	Itu
16:00	Marcinho 43'; Reginaldo 90'	Report		Stadium: Novelli Júnior; Attendance: 1,691; Referee: José Roberto Wright

31 October 25	Santos	0 – 0	Botafogo–SP	São Paulo
16:00		Report		Stadium: Pacaembu; Attendance: 952; Referee: Joaquim Carlos Caetano

3 November 26	Santos	1 – 0	Ferroviária	Santos
17:00	Zé Renato 40'	Report		Stadium: Vila Belmiro; Attendance: 812; Referee: Dagoberto Teixeira

=== Supercopa Libertadores ===
==== Round of 16 ====
1 October First leg	Argentinos Juniors (Argentina)	1 – 2	(Brazil) Santos	Buenos Aires
19:00	Trapasso 81'	Report	38' Paulinho McLaren; 63' Pedro Paulo	Stadium: Ferro Carril Oeste; Referee: Jorge Nieves

10 October Second leg	Santos (Brazil)	0 – 0 (2–1 agg.)	(Argentina) Argentinos Juniors	Brasília
18:30		Report		Stadium: Mané Garrincha; Referee: Juan Escobar

==== Quarter-finals ====
16 October First leg	Peñarol (Uruguay)	3 – 2	(Brazil) Santos	Montevideo
19:00	Cedrés 15'; Montero 61'; Martínez 79' (pen.)	Report	35' Pedro Paulo; 78' Serginho Fraldinha	Stadium: Centenario; Referee: Juan Luis Bava

22 October Second leg	Santos (Brazil)	0 – 0 (2–3 agg.)	(Uruguay) Peñarol	Santos
19:00		Report		Stadium: Vila Belmiro; Attendance: 4,045; Referee: Juan Carlos Losteau
