= 1990 Santos FC season =

Santos
1990 season
- President: Antônio de Aguiar Filho
- Manager: Pepe
- Campeonato Brasileiro: 7th
- Campeonato Paulista: 5th
- Supercopa Libertadores: First round
- Top goalscorer: League: Almir (4); All: Paulinho McLaren (13)

The 1990 season was Santos FC's seventy-eighth season in existence and club's thirty-first in the top flight of Brazilian football since Brasileirão era.

== Players ==
=== Squad ===
Note: Flags indicate national team as defined under FIFA eligibility rules; some limited exceptions apply. Players may hold more than one non-FIFA nationality.

No.	Pos.	Nation	Player
—	GK	BRA	Sérgio Guedes
—	GK	BRA	Nilton
—	GK	BRA	Pizelli
—	GK	BRA	Robson
—	DF	BRA	Amaral
—	DF	BRA	Camilo
—	DF	BRA	Flavinho
—	DF	BRA	França
—	DF	BRA	Índio
—	DF	BRA	Luiz Carlos
—	DF	BRA	Marcelo Veiga
—	DF	BRA	Pedro Paulo
—	MF	BRA	Axel
—	MF	BRA	César Ferreira

No.	Pos.	Nation	Player
—	MF	BRA	César Sampaio
—	MF	BRA	Derval
—	MF	BRA	Edu Marangon
—	MF	BRA	Sérgio Manoel
—	MF	BRA	Sérgio Santos
—	MF	BRA	Zé Humberto
—	MF	BRA	Zé Renato
—	FW	BRA	Almir
—	FW	BRA	Édson Ampola
—	FW	BRA	Ney Bala
—	FW	BRA	Loca
—	FW	BRA	Mendonça
—	FW	BRA	Paulinho McLaren
—	FW	BRA	Serginho Chulapa

Source: Acervo Santista

==== Appearances and goals ====
Pos.	Nat	Name	Brasileiro		Paulista		Supercopa		Total	
Pos.	Nat	Name	Apps	Goals	Apps	Goals	Apps	Goals	Apps	Goals
GK	(Brazil)	Pizelli	0	0	0	0	1	0	1	0
GK	(Brazil)	Sérgio Guedes	21	0	35	0	1	0	57	0
DF	(Brazil)	Amaral	0 (1)	0	0 (1)	0	0	0	2	0
DF	(Brazil)	Camilo	6 (2)	0	20 (4)	1	1	0	33	1
DF	(Brazil)	Flavinho	16	0	14	1	2	0	32	1
DF	(Brazil)	França	6	0	1	0	0	0	7	0
DF	(Brazil)	Ijuí	0	0	9	0	0	0	9	0
DF	(Brazil)	Índio	18	1	16 (1)	0	1	0	36	1
DF	(Brazil)	Luiz Carlos	14 (1)	2	26	0	2	0	43	2
DF	(Brazil)	Marcelo Veiga	6	0	30	0	0	0	36	0
DF	(Brazil)	Márcio Rossini	0	0	18	2	0	0	18	2
DF	(Brazil)	Pedro Paulo	16	0	6	0	2	0	24	0
MF	(Brazil)	Axel	16 (3)	2	25 (1)	1	2	0	47	3
MF	(Brazil)	César Ferreira	0 (3)	0	13 (7)	1	0	0	23	1
MF	(Brazil)	César Sampaio	18	1	34	1	1	0	53	2
MF	(Brazil)	Derval	8 (2)	0	19 (4)	0	1 (1)	0	35	0
MF	(Brazil)	Edu Marangon	11	1	0	0	2	0	13	1
MF	(Brazil)	Gilmar Popoca	0	0	19 (1)	4	0	0	20	4
MF	(Brazil)	Luiz Cláudio	0	0	4 (2)	0	0	0	6	0
MF	(Brazil)	Sérgio Manoel	16 (2)	2	12 (1)	0	1 (1)	0	33	2
MF	(Brazil)	Sérgio Santos	5	0	0	0	0	0	5	0
MF	(Brazil)	Zé Humberto	1 (7)	0	14 (10)	2	0 (1)	0	33	2
MF	(Brazil)	Zé Renato	1	0	1 (2)	0	0	0	4	0
FW	(Brazil)	Almir	18 (1)	4	0	0	2	0	21	4
FW	(Brazil)	Édson Ampola	0 (4)	0	2 (7)	1	0	0	13	1
FW	(Brazil)	Henrique	0	0	2 (1)	0	0	0	3	0
FW	(Japan)	Kazu Miura	0	0	19 (6)	2	0	0	25	2
FW	(Brazil)	Loca	0	0	0 (2)	0	0	0	2	0
FW	(Brazil)	Mendonça	2 (4)	0	8 (4)	0	1 (1)	2	20	2
FW	(Brazil)	Ney Bala	12 (2)	3	0	0	0	0	14	3
FW	(Brazil)	Paulinho McLaren	9 (5)	2	26 (3)	11	1	0	44	13
FW	(Brazil)	Paulo Leme	0	0	1	0	0	0	1	0
FW	(Brazil)	Serginho Chulapa	11 (3)	2	11 (3)	2	1	0	29	4

Source: Match reports in Competitive matches

==== Goalscorers ====
Ran	Pos	Nat	Name	Brasileiro	Paulistão	Supercopa	Total
1	FW	(Brazil)	Paulinho McLaren	2	11	0	13
2	FW	(Brazil)	Almir	4	0	0	4
2	MF	(Brazil)	Gilmar Popoca	0	4	0	4
2	FW	(Brazil)	Serginho Chulapa	2	2	0	4
3	MF	(Brazil)	Axel	2	1	0	3
3	FW	(Brazil)	Ney Bala	3	0	0	3
4	MF	(Brazil)	César Sampaio	1	1	0	2
4	FW	(Japan)	Kazu Miura	0	2	0	2
4	DF	(Brazil)	Luiz Carlos	2	0	0	2
4	DF	(Brazil)	Márcio Rossini	0	2	0	2
4	FW	(Brazil)	Mendonça	0	0	2	2
4	MF	(Brazil)	Sérgio Manoel	2	0	0	2
4	MF	(Brazil)	Zé Humberto	0	2	0	2
5	DF	(Brazil)	Camilo	0	1	0	1
5	MF	(Brazil)	César Ferreira	0	1	0	1
5	FW	(Brazil)	Édson Ampola	0	1	0	1
5	MF	(Brazil)	Edu Marangon	1	0	0	1
5	DF	(Brazil)	Flavinho	0	1	0	1
5	DF	(Brazil)	Índio	1	0	0	1

== Transfers ==
=== In ===
Pos.	Name	Moving to	Source	Notes
RB	(Brazil) Ijuí	Catanduvense		Loan return
RB	(Brazil) Índio	Nacional–SP		
MF	(Brazil) Gilmar Popoca	Louletano (Portugal)		
FW	(Brazil) Henrique	Botafogo–PB		
MF	(Brazil) Zé Humberto	Figueirense		
MF	(Brazil) Derval	Blumenau		
LB	(Brazil) Flavinho	União São João		Loan return
FW	(Brazil) Paulo Leme	Inter de Limeira		Loan return
LB	(Brazil) Marcelo Veiga	Ferroviário		
FW	(Japan) Kazu Miura	Coritiba		On loan
DF	(Brazil) Márcio Rossini	Flamengo		
DF	(Brazil) Amaral	Caldense		
FW	(Brazil) Édson Ampola	Naviraiense		
MF	(Brazil) Zé Renato	Youth system		
FW	(Brazil) Mendonça	Vila Nova		
MF	(Brazil) Luiz Cláudio	Youth system		
FW	(Brazil) Loca	Youth system		
DF	(Brazil) França	Youth system		
FW	(Brazil) Ney Bala	São Paulo		On loan
FW	(Brazil) Almir	Grêmio		On loan
MF	(Brazil) Edu Marangon	Torino (Italy)		On loan
GK	(Brazil) Robson	Youth system		
GK	(Brazil) Pizelli	Iracemapolense		
MF	(Brazil) Sérgio Santos	Youth system		

=== Out ===
Pos.	Name	Moving to	Source	Notes
FW	(Brazil) Juary	Itumbiara		
FW	(Brazil) Roberto Cearense	Free agent		
DF	(Brazil) Luisinho	Ponte Preta		
MF	(Brazil) Ernani	Ponte Preta		
RB	(Brazil) Ditinho	Coritiba		
MF	(Brazil) Heriberto	Atlético Paranaense		
FW	(Brazil) Carlinhos	Atlético Paranaense		
MF	(Brazil) Jorginho Putinatti	XV de Piracicaba		
FW	(Brazil) Essinho	Jaboticabal		On loan
GK	(Brazil) Ferreira	Free agent		
LB	(Brazil) Wladimir	Free agent		
MF	(Brazil) Marco Antônio Cipó	Olímpia		On loan
DF	(Brazil) Cássio	Ferroviário		On loan
FW	(Brazil) Paulo Leme	Sãocarlense		On loan
DF	(Brazil) Davi	Free agent		
FW	(Brazil) Totonho	Remo		
GK	(Brazil) Nilton Pellegrine	Free agent		
FW	(Brazil) Sidney	Atlético Goianiense		
FW	(Brazil) Tuíco	Free agent		
FW	(Japan) Kazu Miura	Yomiuri (Japan)		
FW	(Brazil) Henrique	Central		
MF	(Brazil) Gilmar Popoca	São Paulo		
DF	(Brazil) Márcio Rossini	Internacional		

== Friendlies ==
26 May Taiwan Supercup	Estudiantes de La Plata (Argentina)	0 – 1	(Brazil) Santos	Taipei, Taiwan
		Report	50' Zé Humberto	Stadium: Zhongshan Soccer Stadium; Attendance: 1,000; Referee: Romualdo Arppi Filho

28 May Taiwan Supercup	Nacional (Uruguay)	1 – 1 (0–3 p)	(Brazil) Santos	Kaohsiung, Taiwan
	García 40'	Report	7' Axel	Stadium: National Stadium; Attendance: 4,000; Referee: Abnel Gnecco
	Penalties
	Ramos (penalty missed); Lemos (penalty missed); Soca (penalty missed)		(penalty scored) Sérgio Manoel; (penalty scored) César Sampaio; (penalty scored) César Ferreira

3 June Taiwan Supercup	Nacional (Uruguay)	1 – 1 (a.e.t.)	(Brazil) Santos	Taipei, Taiwan
	García 101'	Report	116' Camilo	Stadium: Zhongshan Soccer Stadium; Referee: Abnel Gnecco

8 June Friendly	Yamaha (Japan)	1 – 2	(Brazil) Santos	Iwata, Japan
	Ohishi 40'	Report	56' Kazu Miura; 59' Mendonça	Stadium: Yamaha Stadium; Referee: Yoshio Sawada

10 June Friendly	P.J.M. Futures (Japan)	2 – 2	(Brazil) Santos	Hamamatsu, Japan
	Itoh 49'; Waldir Lins 86'	Report	15' Sérgio Manoel; 17' Mendonça	Stadium: Honda Miyakoda Soccer Stadium; Referee: Dulcídio Wanderley Boschilia

8 July Friendly	União Mogi	0 – 1	Santos	Mogi das Cruzes
		Report	38' Kazu Miura	Stadium: Cavalheiro Nami Jafet; Attendance: 2,044; Referee: Ílton José da Costa

15 August Friendly	Santos (Brazil)	0 – 0	(Mexico) Universidad de Guadalajara	Santos
		Report		Stadium: Vila Belmiro; Attendance: 1,163; Referee: Flávio de Carvalho

22 August Friendly	Athletic Bilbao (Spain)	0 – 2	(Brazil) Santos	Bilbao, Spain
		Report	35' (o.g.) Alkorta; 78' Ney Bala	Stadium: San Mamés; Attendance: 40,000; Referee: González Lekue

24 August Ramón de Carranza	Cádiz (Spain)	1 – 1 (4–5 p)	(Brazil) Santos	Cádiz, Spain
	Carmelo 85'	Report	45+2' Paulinho McLaren	Stadium: Ramón de Carranza); Attendance: 23,000; Referee: Socorro González
	Penalties
	Romo (penalty scored); Oliva (penalty scored); González (penalty scored); Pepe (penalty scored); Carmelo (penalty missed); Aragón (penalty missed)		(penalty scored) Paulinho McLaren; (penalty scored) Derval; (penalty scored) Édson Ampola; (penalty scored) César Sampaio; (penalty missed) Ney Bala; (penalty scored) César Ferreira

26 August Ramón de Carranza	Atlético Mineiro (Brazil)	1 – 0	(Brazil) Santos	Cádiz, Spain
	Marquinhos 50'	Report		Stadium: Ramón de Carranza); Attendance: 16,000; Referee: Juan Ansuátegui Roca

== Competitions ==
=== Campeonato Brasileiro ===
==== Results summary ====
Overall								Home						Away					
Pld	W	D	L	GF	GA	GAv	Pts	W	D	L	GF	GA	Pts	W	D	L	GF	GA	Pts
21	7	9	5	20	15	1.333	23	7	3	1	13	2	17	0	6	4	7	13	6

==== First stage ====
Pos	Team	Pld	W	D	L	GF	GA	GD	Pts	Qualification or relegation
5	Bahia	19	7	8	4	20	12	+8	22	Advances to the Quarterfinals
6	Bragantino	19	7	8	4	19	16	+3	22	Advances to the Quarterfinals
7	Santos	19	7	8	4	19	13	+6	22	Advances to the Quarterfinals
8	Palmeiras	19	8	5	6	21	18	+3	21	Advances to the Quarterfinals
9	Cruzeiro	19	8	5	6	21	18	+3	21	

===== Matches =====
18 August 1	Náutico	1 – 0	Santos	Recife
17:00	Barros 36'	Report		Stadium: Aflitos; Attendance: 7,426; Referee: Joaquim Gregório dos Santos Filho

29 August 2	Santos	1 – 0	São Paulo	Santos
21:35	César Sampaio 84'	Report		Stadium: Vila Belmiro; Attendance: 5,471; Referee: José Aparecido de Oliveira

2 September 3	Palmeiras	0 – 0	Santos	São Paulo
16:00		Report		Stadium: Parque Antártica; Attendance: 7,670; Referee: Edmundo Lima Filho

8 September 4	Santos	2 – 0	São José	Santos
16:00	Almir 58'; Ney Bala 80'	Report		Stadium: Vila Belmiro; Attendance: 4,768; Referee: Osvaldo dos Santos Ramo

15 September 5	Fluminense	5 – 2	Santos	Rio de Janeiro
16:00	Rinaldo 17', 80'; Edemilson 37', 88'; Luciano 70'	Report	24', 27' Serginho Chulapa	Stadium: São Januário; Attendance: 1,105; Referee: João José Venceslau dos Santos

19 September 6	Santos	0 – 0	Flamengo	Santos
21:30		Report		Stadium: Vila Belmiro; Attendance: 14,430; Referee: José Mocellin

23 September 7	Inter de Limeira	0 – 0	Santos	Limeira
17:00		Report		Stadium: Major José Levy Sobrinho; Attendance: 4,635; Referee: Oscar Roberto Godói

26 September 8	Cruzeiro	1 – 1	Santos	Belo Horizonte
21:30	Édson 87'	Report	90+3' Edu Marangon	Stadium: Mineirão; Attendance: 18,192; Referee: Luís Carlos Félix

1 October 9	Santos	0 – 0	Grêmio	Santos
21:30		Report		Stadium: Vila Belmiro; Attendance: 7,242; Referee: João José Venceslau dos Santos

7 October 10	Santos	3 – 0	Vitória	Santos
17:00	Luiz Carlos 45+3'; Paulinho McLaren 64'; Índio 75'	Report		Stadium: Vila Belmiro; Attendance: 7,541; Referee: Wilson Carlos dos Santos

11 October 11	Santos	1 – 0	Portuguesa	Santos
21:30	Axel 69'	Report		Stadium: Vila Belmiro; Attendance: 6,476; Referee: José Roberto Wright

14 October 12	Santos	0 – 0	Atlético Mineiro	Santos
17:00		Report		Stadium: Vila Belmiro; Attendance: 15,090; Referee: Joaquim Gregório dos Santos Filho

21 October 13	Santos	1 – 0	Bahia	Santos
17:00	Almir 32'	Report		Stadium: Vila Belmiro; Attendance: 9,530; Referee: Silvio Luís de Oliveira

24 October 14	Goiás	1 – 0	Santos	Goiânia
17:00	Wallace 2'	Report		Stadium: Serra Dourada; Attendance: 10,912; Referee: Antônio Macedo de Oliveira

27 October 15	Internacional	1 – 1	Santos	Porto Alegre
17:00	Célio Lino 60'	Report	83' Luiz Carlos	Stadium: Beira-Rio; Attendance: 8,101; Referee: Wilson Carlos dos Santos

4 November 16	Corinthians	1 – 0	Santos	São Paulo
16:00	Dinei 26'	Report		Stadium: Pacaembu; Attendance: 22,137; Referee: David Sidnei Rodrigues Aveiro

10 November 17	Santos	3 – 0	Bragantino	Santos
16:00	Ney Bala 15'; Sérgio Manoel 16'; Almir 87'	Report		Stadium: Vila Belmiro; Attendance: 3,200; Referee: Márcio Rezende de Freitas

15 November 18	Santos	2 – 1	Botafogo	Santos
17:00	Axel 20'; Almir 30'	Report	75' Gilson Jáder	Stadium: Vila Belmiro; Attendance: 11,216; Referee: José Mocellin

18 November 19	Vasco da Gama	2 – 2	Santos	Rio de Janeiro
17:00	Luciano 1'; Bismarck 66'	Report	41' Ney Bala; 74' Sérgio Manoel	Stadium: São Januário; Attendance: 3,880; Referee: Renato Marsiglia

==== Quarter-final ====
24 November 1st leg	Santos	0 – 1	São Paulo	Santos
21:30		Report	41' Mário Tilico	Stadium: Vila Belmiro; Attendance: 19,389; Referee: Joaquim Gregório dos Santos Filho

2 December 2nd leg	São Paulo	1 – 1 (2 – 1 agg.)	Santos	São Paulo
17:00	Eliel 82'	Report	6' Paulinho McLaren	Stadium: Morumbi; Attendance: 44,298; Referee: Wilson Carlos dos Santos

=== Campeonato Paulista ===
==== Results summary ====
Overall								Home						Away					
Pld	W	D	L	GF	GA	GAv	Pts	W	D	L	GF	GA	Pts	W	D	L	GF	GA	Pts
35	12	16	7	29	25	1.16	40	9	6	2	20	12	24	3	10	5	9	13	16

==== First stage ====
Pos	Team	Pld	W	D	L	GF	GA	GD	Pts	Qualification or relegation
3	Bragantino	23	11	6	6	26	14	+12	28	Qualified
4	Novorizontino	23	8	9	6	26	19	+7	25	Qualified
5	Santos	23	7	11	5	18	15	+3	25	Qualified
6	Mogi Mirim	23	6	13	4	23	20	+3	25	Qualified
7	Portuguesa	23	5	15	3	24	20	+4	25	Qualified

Updated to match(es) played on May 12, 1990. Source: RSSSF.com
Rules for classification: 1) points; 2) wins; 3) goal difference; 4) number of goals scored.

===== Matches =====
28 January 1	Santos	0 – 0	São Bento	Santos
16:00		Report		Stadium: Vila Belmiro; Attendance: 3,009; Referee: David Sidney Rodrigues

4 February 2	Santo André	0 – 1	Santos	Santo André
17:00		Report	76' Gilmar Popoca	Stadium: Bruno José Daniel; Attendance: 6,994; Referee: Joaquim Carlos Caetano

7 February 3	Santos	1 – 1	XV de Jaú	Santos
21:00	Paulinho McLaren 64'	Report	85' Ricardo Gaúcho	Stadium: Vila Belmiro; Attendance: 3,559; Referee: Nilson Carlos Busnello

11 February 4	Ferroviária	0 – 0	Santos	Araraquara
16:00		Report		Stadium: Fonte Luminosa; Attendance: 4,205; Referee: Flávio de Carvalho

17 February 5	Santos	1 – 1	Botafogo–SP	Santos
18:00	Gilmar Popoca 46'	Report	60' Vidotti	Stadium: Vila Belmiro; Attendance: 4,570; Referee: João Paulo Araújo

21 February 6	XV de Piracicaba	1 – 0	Santos	Piracicaba
20:30	Gerson Américo 48'	Report		Stadium: Barão da Serra Negra; Attendance: 6,035; Referee: David Sidney Aveiro

4 March 7	Santos	2 – 0	Juventus	Santos
18:00	Serginho Chulapa 63'; Zé Humberto 65'	Report		Stadium: Vila Belmiro; Attendance: 4,461; Referee: José Aparecido de Oliveira

7 March 8	América–SP	1 – 1	Santos	São José do Rio Preto
20:30	Márcio Florêncio 20'	Report	40' Gilmar Popoca	Stadium: Mário Alves Mendonça; Attendance: 4,205; Referee: Ulisses Tavares da Silva

11 March 9	Santos	2 – 0	Ituano	Santos
16:00	Paulinho McLaren 57'; Gilmar Popoca 62'	Report		Stadium: Vila Belmiro; Attendance: 5,098; Referee: Edmundo Lima Filho

14 March 10	Catanduvense	0 – 0	Santos	Catanduva
20:30		Report		Stadium: Sílvio Salles; Attendance: 4,115; Referee: Dulcídio Wanderley Boschilia

18 March 11	Santos	2 – 1	Noroeste	Santos
16:00	Zé Humberto 52'; Paulinho McLaren 55'	Report	72' Marcos César	Stadium: Vila Belmiro; Attendance: 4,102; Referee: Luiz Carlos Antunes

25 March 12	Santos	0 – 1	São Paulo	São Paulo
18:30		Report	3' Ney Bala	Stadium: Pacaembu; Attendance: 15,622; Referee: Osvaldo dos Santos Ramos

29 March 13	Ponte Preta	1 – 0	Santos	Campinas
21:30	Camilo 68' (o.g.)	Report		Stadium: Moisés Lucarelli; Attendance: 2,085; Referee: Edmundo de Lima Filho

1 April 14	Santos	1 – 1	São José	Santos
16:00	César Sampaio 51'	Report	7' Moura	Stadium: Vila Belmiro; Attendance: 4,418; Referee: Ulisses Tavares da Silva

12 April 15	Santos	0 – 0	Portuguesa	Santos
21:30		Report		Stadium: Vila Belmiro; Attendance: 12,621; Referee: Ulisses Tavares da Silva

15 April 16	União São João	0 – 0	Santos	Araras
15:30		Report		Stadium: Hermínio Ometto; Attendance: 7,290; Referee: José Paulo Araújo

18 April 17	Bragantino	2 – 0	Santos	Bragança Paulista
20:30	Tiba 51' (pen.); Ivair 90'	Report		Stadium: Marcelo Stéfani; Attendance: 5,206; Referee: José Aparecido da Silva

22 April 18	Corinthians	1 – 0	Santos	São Paulo
16:00	Neto 62'	Report		Stadium: Pacaembu; Attendance: 43,775; Referee: José Roberto Wright

25 April 19	Santos	3 – 2	Inter de Limeira	Santos
20:30	Camilo 45+1'; Paulinho McLaren 61', 90'	Report	85', 87' Claudinho	Stadium: Vila Belmiro; Attendance: 4,293; Referee: Ílton José da Costa

29 April 20	Palmeiras	1 – 2	Santos	São Paulo
16:00	Roger 63'	Report	57' Kazu Miura; 86' Paulinho McLaren	Stadium: Morumbi; Attendance: 24,768; Referee: João Paulo de Araújo

2 May 21	Mogi Mirim	1 – 1	Santos	Mogi Mirim
20:30	Ronaldo 2'	Report	15' Márcio Rossini	Stadium: Vail Chaves; Attendance: 5,287; Referee: Edmundo Lima Filho

7 May 22	Santos	1 – 0	Guarani	Santos
21:30	Kazu Miura 24'	Report		Stadium: Vila Belmiro; Attendance: 13,322; Referee: José Roberto Wright

12 May 23	Novorizontino	0 – 0	Santos	Novo Horizonte
16:00		Report		Stadium: Jorge Ismael de Biasi; Attendance: 6,067; Referee: José Paulo Araújo

==== Third stage ====
Pos	Team	Pld	W	D	L	GF	GA	GD	Pts	Qualification or relegation
1	Bragantino	12	7	4	1	15	6	+9	18	Qualified
2	Corinthians	12	5	7	0	13	6	+7	17	
3	Santos	12	5	5	2	11	10	+1	15	
4	Botafogo	12	5	2	5	12	11	+1	12	
5	Ituano	12	3	4	5	16	16	0	10	

Updated to match(es) played on August 16, 1990. Source: RSSSF.com
Rules for classification: 1) points; 2) wins; 3) goal difference; 4) number of goals scored.

===== Matches =====
27 June 1	Mogi Mirim	1 – 1	Santos	Mogi Mirim
20:30	Telo 22'	Report	1' Flavinho	Stadium: Vail Chaves; Attendance: 5,287; Referee: Oscar Roberto Godói

1 July 2	Santos	1 – 0	XV de Jaú	Santo André
10:30	Édson Ampola 71'	Report		Stadium: Bruno José Daniel; Attendance: 1,407; Referee: Ílton José da Costa

5 July 3	Bragantino	2 – 0	Santos	Bragança Paulista
20:30	Júnior 26'; Luís Müller 57'	Report		Stadium: Marcelo Stéfani; Attendance: 2,629; Referee: Flávio de Carvalho

15 July 4	Santos	1 – 3	Corinthians	São Paulo
15:30	Márcio Rossini 63'	Report	42' Neto; 79', 89' Fabinho	Stadium: Morumbi; Attendance: 13,983; Referee: Edmundo Lima Filho

18 July 5	Botafogo–SP	1 – 1	Santos	Ribeirão Preto
20:30	Édson Mariano 31'	Report	90+2' Serginho Chulapa	Stadium: Santa Cruz; Attendance: 6,436; Referee: Nilton Carlos Busnello

21 July 6	Santos	2 – 1	Ituano	Santos
16:00	Paulinho McLaren 4', 52' (pen.)	Report	77' (pen.) Alberto	Stadium: Vila Belmiro; Attendance: 1,152; Referee: José Aparecido dos Santos

25 July 7	XV de Jaú	0 – 1	Santos	Jaú
21:00		Report	16' César Ferreira	Stadium: Zezinho Magalhães; Attendance: 1,065; Referee: Paulo Eduardo Pereira Barjas

28 July 8	Santos	1 – 0	Bragantino	Santos
16:00	Paulinho McLaren 72'	Report		Stadium: Vila Belmiro; Attendance: 5,333; Referee: David Sidney Rodrigues Aveiro

1 August 9	Santos	0 – 0	Mogi Mirim	Santos
20:30		Report		Stadium: Vila Belmiro; Attendance: 4,673; Referee: João Massonetto

5 August 10	Ituano	1 – 1	Santos	Itu
15:30	Alberto 88'	Report	25' Paulinho McLaren	Stadium: Novelli Júnior; Attendance: 4,863; Referee: Ílton José da Costa

8 August 11	Santos	2 – 1	Botafogo–SP	Santos
21:00	Paulinho McLaren 24'; Axel 71'	Report	2' (pen.) Gallo	Stadium: Vila Belmiro; Attendance: 2,481; Referee: Dulcídio Wanderley Boschilia

12 August 12	Corinthians	0 – 0	Santos	São Paulo
16:00		Report		Stadium: Pacaembu; Attendance: 23,990; Referee: Ulisses Tavares da Silva Filho

=== Supercopa Libertadores ===
==== First round ====
18 October First leg	Peñarol (Uruguay)	0 – 0	(Brazil) Santos	Montevideo
21:30		Report		Stadium: Centenario; Attendance: 20,000; Referee: Juan Carlos Loustau

7 November Second leg	Santos (Brazil)	2 – 2 (2–2 agg.) (2–4 p)	(Uruguay) Peñarol	Santos
21:30	Mendonça 36', 38'	Report	20' López; 83' Barán	Stadium: Vila Belmiro; Attendance: 2,852; Referee: Ricardo Calabria
	Penalties
	Derval (penalty missed); Almir (penalty scored); Luiz Carlos (penalty missed); Flavinho (penalty scored)		(penalty scored) Villar; (penalty scored) Barán; (penalty scored) Da Silva; (penalty scored) Montero
