= 1992 Santos FC season =

Santos
1992 season
- President: Marcelo Teixeira
- Manager: Rubens Minelli; Geninho; Dé (caretaker)
- Campeonato Brasileiro: 7th
- Campeonato Paulista: 8th
- Supercopa Libertadores: First stage
- Top goalscorer: League: Paulinho McLaren (12); All: Guga (19)

The 1992 season was Santos FC's eightieth season in existence and club's thirty-third in the top flight of Brazilian football since Brasileirão era.

== Players ==
=== Squad ===
Note: Flags indicate national team as defined under FIFA eligibility rules; some limited exceptions apply. Players may hold more than one non-FIFA nationality.

No.	Pos.	Nation	Player
—	GK	BRA	Sérgio Guedes
—	GK	BRA	Nilton
—	GK	BRA	Edinho
—	DF	BRA	Alexandre
—	DF	BRA	Castro
—	DF	BRA	Dinho
—	DF	BRA	Flavinho
—	DF	BRA	Índio
—	DF	BRA	Júnior
—	DF	BRA	Jairo Fernando
—	DF	BRA	Luiz Carlos
—	DF	BRA	Marcelo Fernandes
—	DF	BRA	Nei
—	DF	BRA	Pedro Paulo
—	DF	BRA	Rogerio

No.	Pos.	Nation	Player
—	MF	BRA	Axel
—	MF	BRA	Carlinhos
—	MF	BRA	Edu Marangon
—	MF	BRA	Gallo
—	MF	BRA	Marcelo Passos
—	MF	BRA	Ranielli
—	MF	BRA	Serginho Fraldinha
—	MF	BRA	Sérgio Manoel
—	FW	BRA	Almir
—	FW	BRA	Cilinho
—	FW	BRA	Cristiano
—	FW	BRA	Edmar
—	FW	BRA	Guga
—	FW	BRA	Whelliton

Source: Acervo Santista

==== Appearances and goals ====
Pos.	Nat	Name	Brasileiro		Paulista		Supercopa		Total	
Pos.	Nat	Name	Apps	Goals	Apps	Goals	Apps	Goals	Apps	Goals
GK	(Brazil)	Nilton	0	0	1 (1)	0	0	0	2	0
GK	(Brazil)	Sérgio Guedes	25	0	31	0	2	0	58	0
DF	(Brazil)	Alexandre	0	0	7 (1)	0	0	0	8	0
DF	(Brazil)	Castro	5 (2)	0	1 (1)	0	0	0	9	0
DF	(Brazil)	Dinho	19	1	4	0	0	0	23	1
DF	(Brazil)	Flavinho	8	0	18 (1)	0	1	0	28	0
DF	(Brazil)	Gilson	4 (1)	0	0	0	0	0	5	0
DF	(Brazil)	Índio	6 (4)	0	17 (2)	2	1	0	30	2
DF	(Brazil)	Jairo Fernando	0	0	10	0	1	0	11	0
DF	(Brazil)	Júnior	0	0	25	2	2	0	27	2
DF	(Brazil)	Luiz Carlos	23	0	21	2	2	0	46	2
DF	(Brazil)	Marcelo Fernandes	7 (2)	0	1 (1)	1	0	0	11	1
DF	(Brazil)	Marcelo Veiga	10 (1)	0	2	0	0	0	13	0
DF	(Brazil)	Nei	0	0	12 (1)	0	1	0	14	0
DF	(Brazil)	Pedro Paulo	16	1	0	0	0	0	16	1
DF	(Brazil)	Rogerio	4	0	13 (4)	0	0	0	21	0
MF	(Brazil)	Axel	19	1	27	1	2	0	48	2
MF	(Brazil)	Bernardo	22	1	0	0	0	0	22	1
MF	(Brazil)	Carlinhos	6 (1)	1	0 (2)	0	0	0	9	1
MF	(Brazil)	Edu Marangon	0	0	20	2	2	0	22	2
MF	(Brazil)	Gallo	0	0	15 (6)	0	0	0	21	0
MF	(Brazil)	Marcelo Passos	0 (3)	1	25 (4)	6	2	0	34	7
MF	(Brazil)	Ranielli	5 (1)	1	20 (2)	4	2	0	30	5
MF	(Brazil)	Serginho Fraldinha	1 (6)	0	7 (10)	0	0	0	24	0
MF	(Brazil)	Sérgio Manoel	13 (4)	0	4	0	0	0	21	0
MF	(Brazil)	Zé Renato	4 (1)	0	0	0	0	0	5	0
FW	(Brazil)	Almir	24	3	26	7	2	0	52	10
FW	(Brazil)	Cilinho	22	5	13 (6)	1	0 (1)	0	42	6
FW	(Brazil)	Cristiano	0	0	0 (1)	0	0	0	1	0
FW	(Brazil)	Edmar	0	0	6 (12)	0	0 (1)	0	19	0
FW	(Brazil)	Guga	7 (14)	3	26 (2)	14	2	2	51	19
FW	(Brazil)	João Paulo	2 (6)	0	0	0	0	0	8	0
FW	(Brazil)	Paulinho McLaren	23	12	0	0	0	0	23	12
FW	(Brazil)	Toninho Marques	0 (1)	0	0	0	0	0	1	0
FW	(Brazil)	Whelliton	0	0	0 (1)	0	0	0	1	0

Source: Match reports in Competitive matches

==== Goalscorers ====
Ran	Pos	Nat	Name	Brasileiro	Paulistão	Supercopa	Total
1	FW	(Brazil)	Guga	3	14	2	19
2	FW	(Brazil)	Paulinho McLaren	12	0	0	12
3	FW	(Brazil)	Almir	3	7	0	10
4	MF	(Brazil)	Marcelo Passos	1	6	0	7
5	FW	(Brazil)	Cilinho	5	1	0	6
6	MF	(Brazil)	Ranielli	1	4	0	5
7	MF	(Brazil)	Axel	1	1	0	2
7	MF	(Brazil)	Edu Marangon	0	2	0	2
7	DF	(Brazil)	Índio	0	2	0	2
7	DF	(Brazil)	Júnior	0	2	0	2
7	DF	(Brazil)	Luiz Carlos	0	2	0	2
8	MF	(Brazil)	Bernardo	1	0	0	1
8	MF	(Brazil)	Carlinhos	1	0	0	1
8	DF	(Brazil)	Dinho	1	0	0	1
8	DF	(Brazil)	Marcelo Fernandes	0	1	0	1
8	DF	(Brazil)	Pedro Paulo	1	0	0	1

== Transfers ==
=== In ===
Pos.	Name	Moving from	Source	Notes
FW	(Brazil) Toninho Marques	José Bonifácio		
FW	(Brazil) Guga	Inter de Limeira		
MF	(Brazil) Bernardo	Bayern Munich (Germany)		On loan
LB	(Brazil) Gilson	Rio Branco–SP		On loan
FW	(Brazil) Cilinho	Inter de Limeira		On loan
DF	(Brazil) Castro	Paraná		On loan
RB	(Brazil) Dinho	Ituano		On loan
GK	(Brazil) Denilton	Marília		On loan
MF	(Brazil) Cerezo	Oeste		
FW	(Brazil) João Paulo	Grêmio Maringá		
RB	(Brazil) Alexandre	Brasil Farroupilha		On loan
MF	(Brazil) Alexandre Gallo	Botafogo–SP		
MF	(Brazil) Edu Marangon	Palmeiras		On loan
RB	(Brazil) Jairo Fernando	Internacional		On loan
DF	(Brazil) Júnior	Ponte Preta		
DF	(Brazil) Nei	Bragantino		
FW	(Brazil) Edmar	Atlético Mineiro		On loan

=== Out ===
Pos.	Name	Moving to	Source	Notes
FW	(Brazil) Tato	Free agent		
RB	(Brazil) Lico	Paulistano de São Roque		Loan return
LB	(Brazil) Washington	Paulistano de São Roque		Loan return
FW	(Brazil) Marcos Lira	Portuguesa Santista		
DF	(Brazil) Camilo	Rio Branco–SP		On loan
MF	(Brazil) Sérgio Santos	Rio Branco–SP		On loan
DF	(Brazil) Maurício Copertino	Oeste		On loan
FW	(Brazil) Mendonça	Oeste		On loan
DF	(Brazil) França	Oeste		On loan
FW	(Brazil) Loca	Oeste		On loan
MF	(Brazil) Essinho	Jaboticabal		On loan
FW	(Brazil) Gláucio	Jaboticabal		On loan
GK	(Brazil) Robson	Matonense		On loan
FW	(Brazil) Toninho Marques	Portuguesa Santista		On loan
FW	(Brazil) Mendonça	Portuguesa Santista		On loan
FW	(Brazil) Loca	Portuguesa Santista		On loan
LB	(Brazil) Gilson	Rio Branco–SP		Loan return
MF	(Brazil) Zé Renato	Botafogo–SP		On loan
FW	(Brazil) João Paulo	Free agent		
MF	(Brazil) Bernardo	Bayern Munich (Germany)		Loan return
FW	(Brazil) Paulinho McLaren	Porto (Portugal)		
LB	(Brazil) Marcelo Veiga	Internacional		On loan
GK	(Brazil) Denilton	Botafogo–SP		
DF	(Brazil) Castro	Paraná		Loan return
FW	(Brazil) Toninho Marques	Ferroviária		On loan
MF	(Brazil) Sérgio Manoel	Fluminense		On loan
DF	(Brazil) Pedro Paulo	Remo		On loan

== Friendlies ==
19 January Friendly	Rio Branco	1 – 5	Santos	São João da Boa Vista
	Gílson 15'	Report	10' Índio; 50' Guga; 55' Sérgio Manoel; 23' Marcelo Veiga; Castro	Attendance: 936; Referee: José Carlos Barbosa

22 January Friendly	Poços de Caldas	0 – 6	Santos	Poços de Caldas
		Report	Guga; Paulinho McLaren; Ranielli; Serginho Fraldinha; Zé Renato

26 February Friendly	Araçatuba	1 – 1	Santos	Araçatuba
	Márcio Rogério	Report	Paulinho McLaren	Stadium: Adhemar de Barros; Referee: Oscar Roberto Godói

22 April Friendly	CRB	2 – 0	Santos	Maceió
	Hamilton 21', 67'	Report		Stadium: Rei Pelé; Attendance: 5,000; Referee: Nilson de Carvalho

26 August Friendly	Shimizu S-Pulse (Japan)	0 – 3	Santos	Tokyo, Japan
		Report	11' Guga; 18' Serginho Fraldinha; 24' Ranielli	Stadium: National Stadium; Attendance: 46,000; Referee: Sagawa
Note: according to A Tribuna, this match was played on 26 August and all the goals were scored in the second half.

29 August Friendly	Shimizu S-Pulse (Japan)	1 – 1	Santos	Shizuoka, Japan
	Oenoki 27'	Report	27' Edu Marangon	Stadium: Kusanagi Athletic Stadium; Attendance: 30,000; Referee: Tachi

== Competitions ==
=== Campeonato Brasileiro ===
==== Results summary ====
Overall								Home						Away					
Pld	W	D	L	GF	GA	GAv	Pts	W	D	L	GF	GA	Pts	W	D	L	GF	GA	Pts
25	8	10	7	30	27	1.111	26	6	5	2	18	9	17	2	5	5	12	18	9

==== First stage ====
Pos	Team	Pld	W	D	L	GF	GA	GD	Pts	Qualification
6	São Paulo	19	8	5	6	22	16	+6	21	Qualified to Group 1
7	Cruzeiro	19	7	7	5	10	14	−4	21	Qualified to Group 2
8	Santos	19	7	7	5	23	18	+5	21	Qualified to Group 1
9	Guarani	19	8	4	7	15	19	−4	20	
10	Internacional	19	7	6	6	19	20	−1	20	

===== Matches =====
29 January 1	Santos	1 – 1	São Paulo	Santos
20:30	Paulinho McLaren 55'	Report	16' (o.g.) Castro	Stadium: Vila Belmiro; Attendance: 18,017; Referee: José Aparecido de Oliveira

2 February 2	Corinthians	1 – 1	Santos	São Paulo
17:00	Jairo 11'	Report	41' Almir	Stadium: Pacaembu; Attendance: 17,055; Referee: Ílton José da Costa

8 February 3	Goiás	1 – 0	Santos	Goiânia
16:00	Túlio 54' (pen.)	Report		Stadium: Serra Dourada; Attendance: 10,469; Referee: Válter Senra

17 February 4	Santos	1 – 0	Guarani	Santos
21:10	Pedro Paulo 73'	Report		Stadium: Vila Belmiro; Attendance: 8,559; Referee: Oscar Roberto Godói

20 February 5	Santos	2 – 1	Paysandu	Santos
20:30	Ranielli 8'; Carlinhos 90+1'	Report	62' Vlademir	Stadium: Vila Belmiro; Attendance: 7,008; Referee: Dalmo Bozzano

23 February 6	Fluminense	4 – 0	Santos	Rio de Janeiro
16:00	Ézio 24', 58' (pen.); Julinho 60'; Renato Carioca 90'	Report		Stadium: Laranjeiras; Attendance: 3,105; Referee: Márcio Rezende de Freitas

7 March 7	Santos	2 – 0	Flamengo	Santos
16:00	Paulinho McLaren 71', 79'	Report		Stadium: Vila Belmiro; Attendance: 13,721; Referee: Wilson Carlos dos Santos

11 March 8	Sport Recife	2 – 2	Santos	Recife
21:00	Silvio Ceará 25'; Gilton 47'	Report	5' Bernardo; 46' Paulinho McLaren	Stadium: Ilha do Retiro; Attendance: 19,963; Referee: José Roberto Wright

16 March 9	Santos	2 – 0	Portuguesa	Santos
21:10	Almir 16'; Cilinho 86'	Report		Stadium: Vila Belmiro; Attendance: 6,268; Referee: Válter Francisco dos Santos

22 March 10	Santos	0 – 1	Bragantino	Santos
16:00		Report	24' Tiba	Stadium: Vila Belmiro; Attendance: 13,713; Referee: Oscar Roberto Godói

30 March 11	Santos	4 – 0	Internacional	Santos
21:00	Paulinho McLaren 18'; Cilinho 57', 60'; Axel 71'	Report		Stadium: Vila Belmiro; Attendance: 7,941; Referee: José Roberto Wright

6 April 12	Palmeiras	1 – 1	Santos	São Paulo
20:30	Alexandre Rosa 25'	Report	78' Cilinho	Stadium: Parque Antártica; Attendance: 18,710; Referee: Edmundo Lima Filho

11 April 13	Santos	0 – 0	Atlético Mineiro	Santos
16:00		Report		Stadium: Vila Belmiro; Attendance: 10,746; Referee: José Mocellin

20 April 14	Náutico	0 – 2	Santos	Recife
20:30		Report	69', 90+1' Paulinho McLaren	Stadium: Aflitos; Attendance: 4,063; Referee: Márcio Rezende de Freitas

26 April 15	Botafogo	2 – 0	Santos	Niterói
17:00	Pingo 27'; Marcelo Fernandes 63' (o.g.)	Report		Stadium: Caio Martins; Attendance: 12,072; Referee: José Mocellin

2 May 16	Santos	2 – 2	Atlético Paranaense	Santos
16:00	Cilinho 9'; Paulinho McLaren 53'	Report	51', 83' Negrini	Stadium: Vila Belmiro; Attendance: 3,849; Referee: Wilson Carlos dos Santos

9 May 17	Santos	1 – 2	Cruzeiro	Santos
16:00	Guga 72'	Report	2', 77' Cleisson	Stadium: Vila Belmiro; Attendance: 11,804; Referee: Manoel Serapião Filho

25 May 18	Bahia	0 – 2	Santos	Salvador
20:30		Report	26' (pen.) Paulinho McLaren; 90' Dinho	Stadium: Fonte Nova; Attendance: 2,769; Referee: José Mocellin

31 May 19	Vasco da Gama	0 – 0	Santos	Rio de Janeiro
17:00		Report		Stadium: São Januário; Attendance: 7,852; Referee: Renato Marsiglia

==== Second stage ====
Group 1
Pos	Team	Pld	W	D	L	GF	GA	GD	Pts	Qualification
1	Flamengo	6	3	1	2	7	5	+2	7	Finalist
2	Vasco	6	1	4	1	10	9	+1	6	
3	São Paulo	6	2	2	2	6	7	−1	6	
4	Santos	6	1	3	2	7	9	−2	5	

===== Matches =====
7 June 1	Vasco da Gama	3 – 3	Santos	Rio de Janeiro
17:00	Bebeto 28', 40', 70'	Report	10', 66', 86' Paulinho McLaren	Stadium: Maracanã; Attendance: 30,543; Referee: Márcio Rezende de Freitas

20 June 2	Santos	1 – 0	Flamengo	São Paulo
16:00	Guga 8'	Report		Stadium: Morumbi; Attendance: 28,402; Referee: Dalmo Bozzano

27 June 3	Santos	1 – 1	São Paulo	São Paulo
16:00	Almir 90+2'	Report	5' Ivan Rocha	Stadium: Pacaembu; Attendance: 33,042; Referee: Ulisses Tavares da Silva Filho

1 July 4	São Paulo	1 – 0	Santos	São Paulo
20:30	Macedo 9'	Report		Stadium: Morumbi; Attendance: 35,691; Referee: Renato Marsiglia

5 July 5	Santos	1 – 1	Vasco da Gama	São Paulo
16:30	Guga 81'	Report	50' Edmundo	Stadium: Morumbi; Attendance: 15,151; Referee: José Mocellin

8 July 6	Flamengo	3 – 1	Santos	Rio de Janeiro
21:30	Nélio 22'; Bernardo 58' (o.g.); Gaúcho 90'	Report	81' Marcelo Passos	Stadium: Maracanã; Attendance: 29,149; Referee: Renato Marsiglia

=== Campeonato Paulista ===
==== Results summary ====
Overall								Home						Away					
Pld	W	D	L	GF	GA	GAv	Pts	W	D	L	GF	GA	Pts	W	D	L	GF	GA	Pts
32	11	12	9	44	35	1.257	34	7	5	4	26	17	19	4	7	5	18	18	15

==== First stage ====
Pos	Team	Pld	W	D	L	GF	GA	GD	Pts	Qualification or relegation
2	Palmeiras	26	12	9	5	30	16	+14	33	Qualified
3	Corinthians	26	12	8	6	32	20	+12	32	Qualified
4	Santos	26	10	12	4	39	23	+16	32	Qualified
5	Portuguesa	26	10	11	5	34	20	+14	31	Qualified
6	Guarani	26	8	14	4	30	26	+4	30	Qualified

Updated to match(es) played on 1 November 1992. Source: RSSSF.com
Rules for classification: 1) points; 2) wins; 3) goal difference; 4) number of goals scored.

===== Matches =====
18 July 1	Santos	3 – 0	Botafogo–SP	Santos
16:00	Axel 2'; Almir 35'; Índio 65'	Report		Stadium: Vila Belmiro; Attendance: 5,724; Referee: Dagoberto Teixeira

26 July 2	Palmeiras	2 – 0	Santos	São Paulo
15:30	Sorato 4'; Galeano 26'	Report		Stadium: Pacaembu; Attendance: 18,038; Referee: Edmundo Lima Filho

29 July 3	Santos	0 – 0	Noroeste	Santos
20:30		Report		Stadium: Vila Belmiro; Attendance: 3,961; Referee: João Paulo Araújo

1 August 4	Santo André	1 – 1	Santos	Santo André
16:00	Mathias 88'	Report	79' Marcelo Fernandes	Stadium: Bruno José Daniel; Attendance: 4,835; Referee: José Aparecido Teixeira

5 August 5	Santos	2 – 0	Guarani	Santos
20:30	Luiz Carlos 1'; Guga 75'	Report		Stadium: Vila Belmiro; Attendance: 3,438; Referee: Paulo Eduardo Pereira Barjas

9 August 6	Santos	1 – 1	Corinthians	São Paulo
20:15	Edu Marangon 12'	Report	19' Ezequiel	Stadium: Pacaembu; Attendance: 13,697; Referee: Oscar Roberto Godói

12 August 7	Juventus	1 – 1	Santos	São Paulo
15:30	Neto 30'	Report	40' Ranielli	Stadium: Canindé; Attendance: 3,247; Referee: Marcos Fábio Spironelli

16 August 8	Portuguesa	0 – 0	Santos	São Paulo
15:30		Report		Stadium: Canindé; Attendance: 11,069; Referee: Ulisses Tavares da Silva

19 August 9	Sãocarlense	2 – 1	Santos	São Carlos
20:30	Luiz Carlos Carioca 24', 29'	Report	50' Almir	Stadium: Luís Augusto de Oliveira; Attendance: 6,532; Referee: Flávio de Carvalho

22 August 10	Santos	3 – 0	Bragantino	Santos
15:30	Marcelo Passos 8'; Cilinho 64' (pen.); Almir 84'	Report		Stadium: Vila Belmiro; Attendance: 4,436; Referee: Silas Santana

5 September 11	Santos	3 – 2	São Paulo	Santos
16:00	Guga 3'; Edu Marangon 27'; Adilson 67' (o.g.)	Report	81' Palhinha; 87' Ivan Rocha	Stadium: Vila Belmiro; Attendance: 13,947; Referee: José Roberto Wright

9 September 12	Inter de Limeira	0 – 3	Santos	Limeira
20:30		Report	6' Guga; 76' Almir; 78' Marcelo Passos	Stadium: Major José Levy Sobrinho; Attendance: 5,911; Referee: Elson José Régis Filho

13 September 13	Ituano	2 – 2	Santos	Itu
15:30	Celso 42', 88'	Report	21' Guga; 72' Marcelo Passos	Stadium: Novelli Júnior; Attendance: 9,500; Referee: Hilton José da Costa

20 September 14	São Paulo	0 – 0	Santos	São Paulo
16:00		Report		Stadium: Morumbi; Attendance: 37,928; Referee: Dionísio Roberto Domingos

23 September 15	Santos	2 – 1	Juventus	São Paulo
20:45	Guga 50'; Júnior 73'	Report	3' Ricardo Eugênio	Stadium: Canindé; Attendance: 4,467; Referee: João Paulo Araújo

27 September 16	Noroeste	1 – 0	Santos	Bauru
15:30	Cláudio 7' (pen.)	Report		Stadium: Alfredo de Castilho; Attendance: 7,598; Referee: Ulysses Tavares Santana

1 October 17	Santos	0 – 0	Sãocarlense	Santos
20:30		Report		Stadium: Vila Belmiro; Attendance: 7,184; Referee: Joaquim Carlos Caetano

4 October 18	Bragantino	0 – 1	Santos	Bragança Paulista
15:30		Report	75' Guga	Stadium: Marcelo Stéfani; Attendance: 7,492; Referee: Oscar Roberto Godói

7 October 19	Santos	4 – 0	Inter de Limeira	Santos
20:30	Guga 21', 44'; Ranielli 40'; Luiz Carlos 73'	Report		Stadium: Vila Belmiro; Attendance: 2,159; Referee: Osvaldo Santos Ramos

10 October 20	Santos	0 – 1	Palmeiras	São Paulo
16:00		Report	82' Alexandre Rosa	Stadium: Morumbi; Attendance: 18,339; Referee: José Aparecido de Oliveira

15 October 21	Botafogo–SP	2 – 2	Santos	São Paulo
20:30	Demétrius 11', 59'	Report	14' Almir; 78' (o.g.) Lucilo	Stadium: Canindé; Attendance: 4,961; Referee: Oscar Roberto Godói

17 October 22	Santos	2 – 1	Portuguesa	Santos
16:00	Guga 54', 83'	Report	77' Adil	Stadium: Vila Belmiro; Attendance: 7,870; Referee: Silas Santana

21 October 23	Santos	2 – 2	Ituano	Santos
20:30	Almir 51'; Ranielli 85'	Report	20' Marcinho; 30' Romeu	Stadium: Vila Belmiro; Attendance: 6,958; Referee: Edmundo Lima Filho

25 October 24	Corinthians	1 – 3	Santos	São Paulo
16:30	Paulo Sérgio 30'	Report	34', 47', 63' Guga	Stadium: Morumbi; Attendance: 19,856; Referee: João Paulo Araújo

28 October 25	Guarani	1 – 1	Santos	Campinas
20:30	Edílson 32'	Report	58' Júnior	Stadium: Brinco de Ouro; Attendance: 5,975; Referee: Paulo Eduardo Pereira Barjas

31 October 26	Santos	2 – 2	Santo André	Santos
16:30	Marcelo Passos 60', 64'	Report	29' Donizete; 77' (pen.) Edelvan	Stadium: Vila Belmiro; Attendance: 6,844; Referee: Flávio de Carvalho

==== Second stage ====
Pos	Team	Pld	W	D	L	GF	GA	GD	Pts	Qualification or relegation
1	São Paulo	6	5	1	0	14	4	+10	11	Qualified
2	Portuguesa	6	3	1	2	8	8	0	7	
3	Ponte Preta	6	1	2	3	5	8	−3	4	
4	Santos	6	1	0	5	5	12	−7	2	

Updated to match(es) played on 29 November 1992. Source: RSSSF.com
Rules for classification: 1) points; 2) wins; 3) goal difference; 4) number of goals scored.

===== Matches =====
7 November 1	Ponte Preta	0 – 1	Santos	Campinas
16:00		Report	81' Índio	Stadium: Moisés Lucarelli; Attendance: 17,272; Referee: Edmundo Lima Filho

11 November 2	Santos	0 – 3	São Paulo	São Paulo
20:30		Report	40' Palhinha; 60' Toninho Cerezo; 84' Vítor	Stadium: Pacaembu; Attendance: 40,000; Referee: Oscar Roberto Godói

14 November 3	Santos	1 – 2	Portuguesa	Santos
16:00	Guga 45'	Report	13' Adil; 82' Éder	Stadium: Vila Belmiro; Attendance: 15,175; Referee: José Roberto Wright

18 November 4	São Paulo	2 – 1	Santos	São Paulo
20:30	Cafu 6'; Müller 78'	Report	80' Almir	Stadium: Pacaembu; Attendance: 14,104; Referee: Flávio de Carvalho

22 November 5	Portuguesa	3 – 1	Santos	São Paulo
17:00	Bentinho 21' (pen.), 61'; Capitão 81'	Report	48' Marcelo Passos	Stadium: Canindé; Attendance: 3,029; Referee: Edmundo Lima Filho

28 November 6	Santos	1 – 2	Ponte Preta	Santos
16:00	Ranielli 60'	Report	30', 47' Jucemar	Stadium: Vila Belmiro; Referee: Nílton Carlos Busnella

=== Supercopa Libertadores ===
==== Round of 16 ====
29 September First leg	Santos (Brazil)	1 – 1	(Brazil) São Paulo	São Paulo
21:15	Guga 72' (pen.)	Report	78' Müller	Stadium: Parque Antártica; Attendance: 10,956; Referee: Márcio Rezende de Freitas

13 October Second leg	São Paulo (Brazil)	4 – 1 (5–2 agg.)	(Brazil) Santos	São Paulo
20:30	Raí 5'; Palhinha 17'; Válber 49'; Dinho 83'	Report	45' Guga	Stadium: Morumbi; Attendance: 8,425; Referee: José Roberto Wright
