= Santos FC and the Brazil national football team =

Brazilian sports team

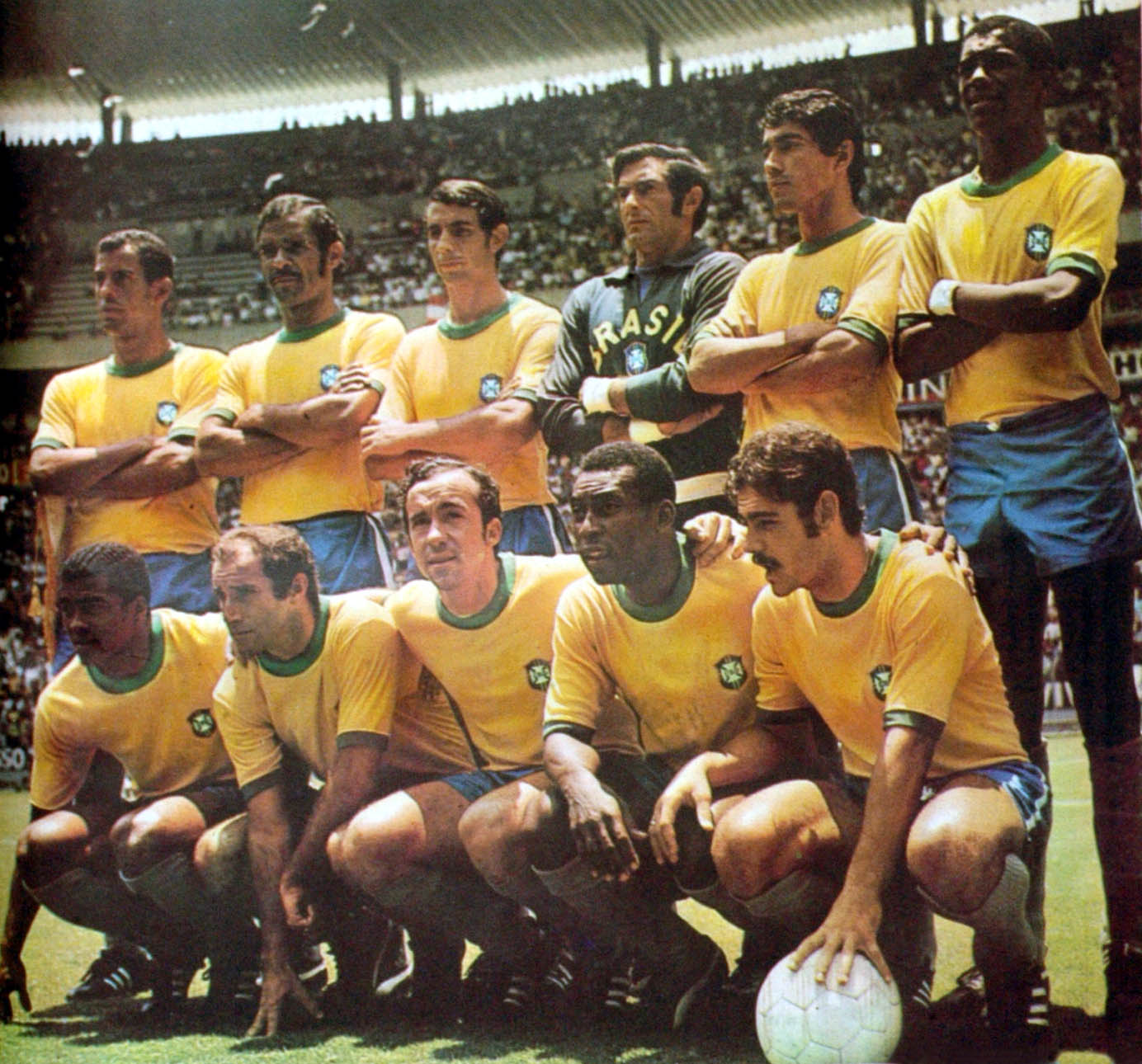
Brazil's set up, with Pelé, Clodoaldo and Carlos Alberto, before the match against Italy in 1970 FIFA World Cup at Estadio Azteca (Mexico City, Mexico - June 21st, 1970).

Santos Futebol Clube is a Brazilian professional football club, based in Santos, Brazil. They play in the Campeonato Paulista, São Paulo's state league, and the Campeonato Brasileiro Série A or Brasileirão, Brazil's national league, and are one of the only three clubs to have never been relegated, along with São Paulo and Flamengo. Santos was a founding member of the Clube dos 13 (English: Club of the 13) group of Brazil's leading football clubs.

The club has contributed many players to the Brazil national team, including to Brazil's World Cup-winning teams, especially during the golden generation of players known as Os Santásticos (The Santastics), from 1956 until 1974. Led by Lula, the team won a total of 22 titles between 1959 and 1974, including two Copa Libertadores, the most prestigious laurel in South American football. Os Santásticos dominated the Brazil national football team and had what was considered by some the best club team of all times, and became a symbol of Joga Bonito (English: The Beautiful Game) in football culture, thanks to figures such as Gilmar, Mauro, Mengálvio, Coutinho, Pepe and the iconic Pelé, named the "Athlete of the Century" by the International Olympic Committee, and widely regarded among football historians, former players and fans to be one of the best and most accomplished footballers in the game's history.

Santos contributed players to the victorious Brazil national teams of 1958, 1962 and 1970 FIFA World Cups. It has also contributed players to the winning sides of the 1916, 2004 and 2007 Copa Américas as well as the 2005 and 2013 FIFA Confederations Cup. One Santos player has won the Golden Ball award at the World Cup with Brazil; Pelé in 1970. Neymar replicated Pelé at the Confederations Cup by winning that competition's golden ball. Pinga and Narciso represented Brazil in medal winning squads at the 1984 and 1996 Summer Olympics.

== List of call-ups of Santos FC players to the Brazil national teams ==
Below is a list of all Santos FC players to have played in the main national team (or Seleção in Portuguese language) while representing the club in official matches since 1916.

- Neymar
- Adolpho Millon
- Almir
- Araken Patusca
- Arnaldo Patusca
- Arouca
- Axel
- Carlos Alberto
- Castelhano
- Cláudio
- Clodoaldo
- Constantino Mollitsas
- Coutinho
- Del Vecchio
- Diego
- Dorval
- Durval
- Edú
- Elano
- Fábio Costa
- Formiga
- Gabriel
- Ganso
- Gilmar
- Giovanni
- Haroldo
- João Paulo
- Joel
- Jorge
- Juary
- Kléber
- Léo
- Lima
- Lucas Lima
- Márcio Rossini
- Marcos Assunção
- Marinho Peres
- Mauro Ramos
- Mengálvio
- Müller
- Narciso
- Nilton Batata
- Orlando
- Otto Banduck
- Paulo Almeida
- Pelé
- Pepe
- Pita
- Rafael Cabral
- Renato
- Ricardo Oliveira
- Robert
- Robinho
- Sérgio
- Silas
- Sylvio Hoffmann
- Tite
- Toninho Carlos
- Zito

== List of call-ups of Santos FC players to the Brazil national Olympic teams ==
Below is a list of all Santos FC players to have played in the Brazil national Olympic team in official matches while representing the club.

- André Luís
- Alex
- Baiano
- Diego
- Fábio Costa
- Gabriel
- Jamelli
- Marinho
- Michel
- Narciso
- Nenê
- Neymar
- Paulo Almeida
- Paulo Henrique Ganso
- Rafael Cabral
- Robinho
- Thiago Maia
- Zeca
- Yuri Alberto

== List of call-ups of Santos FC players to the Brazil national U-20 teams ==
Below is a list of all Santos FC players to have played in the Brazil national U-20 team in official matches while representing the club.

- Alan Patrick
- Alex Sandro
- Alison
- André Dias
- Ângelo
- Caju
- Carlinhos
- César Sampaio
- Danilo
- Felipe Anderson
- Felipe Garcia
- Gabriel Barbosa
- Gabriel Gasparotto
- Gérson
- Guilherme Nunes
- Gustavo Henrique
- Jair
- Jean
- Jubal
- Kaio Jorge
- Kaiky
- Leonardo
- Marcelo
- Marcos Leonardo
- Neymar
- Paulo Henrique Ganso
- Renatinho
- Robson Bambu
- Rodrygo
- Sérgio Manoel
- Thiago Maia
- Victor Andrade
- William

== List of call-ups of Santos FC players to the Brazil national U-17 teams ==
Below is a list of all Santos FC players to have played in the Brazil national U-17 team in official matches while representing de club.

- Adriano
- Ângelo
- Arthur Gomes
- Bruno Moraes
- Crystian
- Derick
- Diego
- Diego Cardoso
- Elivelton
- Emerson
- Felipe
- Felipe Anderson
- Gabriel
- Guido
- Guilherme Nunes
- Ivonei
- Kaio Jorge
- JP Chermont
- Leonardo
- Lucas Lourenço
- Marco Antônio
- Neymar
- Renyer
- Rodrigo Cezar
- Rodrygo
- Sandry
- Souza
- Thiago Maia
- Victor Yan
- Vinícius Lira
- Yuri Alberto

== See also ==
- List of Santos FC players
- Brazil national football team
- Brazil national under-23 football team
- Brazil national under-20 football team
- Brazil national under-17 football team
- Football in Brazil
- Brazil national squads in World and South American championships
- List of footballers with 100 or more caps
