= Serginho Fraldinha =

Brazilian footballer (born 1973)

Personal information
- Full name: Sérgio Ricardo Ramalho
- Date of birth: 27 May 1973 (age 53)
- Place of birth: São Paulo, Brazil
- Height: 1.66 m (5 ft 5 in)
- Position: Forward

Youth career
- Pequeninos do Jockey
- Palmeiras

Senior career*
| Years | Team | Apps | (Gls) |
| 1990–1991 | Palmeiras | 23 | (0) |
| 1991–1996 | Santos | 65 | (3) |
| 1993 | → Confiança (loan) | | |
| 1995 | → São José-SP (loan) | 1 | (1) |
| 1996 | → América-SP (loan) | 15 | (0) |
| 1997 | Sãocarlense | | |
| 1997–1998 | União da Madeira | 28 | (5) |
| 1998–1999 | Stade Tunisien | | |
| 1999–2001 | Estrela Amadora | | |

International career
| 1989 | Brazil U17 | 4 | (0) |
| 1991 | Brazil U20 | 3 | (0) |
- * Club domestic league appearances and goals

Sérgio Ricardo Ramalho (born 27 May 1973), known as Serginho Fraldinha, is a Brazilian retired footballer who played as a forward.

== Career ==
Born in São Paulo, Serginho Fraldinha began his career with local side Pequeninos do Jockey before joining the youth categories of Palmeiras. He made his first team debut at the age of 16 on 25 April 1990, coming on as a substitute for Buião in a 1–0 Campeonato Paulista home win over União São João.

Sparingly used during the 1990 and 1991 seasons, Serginho Fraldinha moved to Santos in July 1991 along with Ranielli, as a part of the deal which saw César Sampaio join Palmeiras. Unable to establish himself as a regular starter, he was loaned out to Confiança in September 1993.

Back to Santos for the 1994 campaign, Serginho Fraldinha was again a backup option and moved to São José-SP on loan in the following year. He suffered a serious injury at the latter which kept him sidelined for the entire year, and left Peixe in the end of the 1996 season, after another loan at América-SP.

In 1997, after a short period at Sãocarlense, Serginho moved abroad and signed for Portuguese side União da Madeira. He then spent a season at Stade Tunisien before returning to Portugal in 1999, with Estrela Amadora.

Serginho Fraldinha retired in 2001, aged 28, after struggling with injuries. After retiring, he worked as a coach in a youth school of Corinthians in Osasco.

== Career statistics ==
Appearances and goals by club, season and competition
| Club | Season | League | | | State league (Note: Includes Campeonato Paulista, Campeonato Paulista Série A2) | | National cup (Note: Includes Taça de Portugal) | | Continental | | Other | | Total | |
| Club | Season | Division | Apps | Goals | Apps | Goals | Apps | Goals | Apps | Goals | Apps | Goals | Apps | Goals |
|---|---|---|---|---|---|---|---|---|---|---|---|---|---|---|
| Palmeiras | 1990 | Série A | 0 | 0 | 13 | 0 | — | | — | | — | | 13 | 0 |
| Palmeiras | 1991 | Série A | 10 | 0 | — | | — | | — | | — | | 10 | 0 |
| Palmeiras | Total | | 10 | 0 | 13 | 0 | — | | — | | — | | 23 | 0 |
| Santos | 1991 | Série A | — | | 20 | 2 | — | | 3 (Note: Appearance(s) in Supercopa Libertadores) | 1 | — | | 23 | 3 |
| Santos | 1992 | Série A | 7 | 0 | 17 | 0 | — | | 0 | 0 | — | | 24 | 0 |
| Santos | 1993 | Série A | 0 | 0 | 8 | 1 | — | | 0 | 0 | 0 | 0 | 8 | 1 |
| Santos | 1994 | Série A | 7 | 0 | 6 | 0 | — | | 1 | 0 | 8 (Note: Appearance(s) in Copa Bandeirantes) | 1 | 22 | 1 |
| Santos | Total | | 14 | 0 | 51 | 3 | — | | 4 | 1 | 8 | 1 | 77 | 5 |
| São José-SP (loan) | 1995 | Paulista A2 | — | | 1 | 1 | — | | — | | — | | 1 | 1 |
| América-SP (loan) | 1996 | Paulista | — | | 15 | 0 | — | | — | | — | | 15 | 0 |
| União da Madeira | 1997–98 | Segunda Divisão de Honra | 28 | 5 | — | | 1 | 0 | — | | — | | 29 | 5 |
| Estrela Amadora | 1999–2000 | Primeira Liga | 17 | 1 | — | | 1 | 0 | — | | — | | 18 | 1 |
| Estrela Amadora | 2000–01 | Primeira Liga | 9 | 0 | — | | 1 | 0 | — | | — | | 10 | 0 |
| Estrela Amadora | Total | | 26 | 1 | — | | 2 | 0 | — | | — | | 28 | 1 |
| Career Total | | | 78 | 6 | 80 | 4 | 3 | 0 | 4 | 1 | 8 | 1 | 173 | 12 |
