= Tallison =

Brazilian footballer

Personal information
- Full name: Tallison Diego Nunes Da Costa
- Date of birth: 26 March 1998 (age 28)
- Place of birth: Jaraguá, Brazil
- Height: 1.91 m (6 ft 3 in)
- Position: Goalkeeper

Team information
- Current team: Apollon Larissa
- Number: 27

Youth career
- –2015: Vila Nova

Senior career*
Years	Team	Apps	(Gls)
2016	Vila Nova		
2017	Anápolis		
2017	Trindade	1	(0)
2017–2018	Vila Nova		
2018	Anápolis		
2018–2019	CSA		
2019	Murici		
2020	Bandeirante	2	(0)
2020	Jaraguá		
2020–	Apollon Larissa	3	(0)
- * Club domestic league appearances and goals as of 23 January 2021

Tallison Diego Nunes Da Costa (born 26 March 1998), commonly known as Tallison, is a Brazilian professional footballer who plays as a goalkeeper for Super League 2 club Apollon Larissa.
