= Paulinho McLaren =

Brazilian footballer

Personal information
- Full name: Paulo César Vieira Rosa
- Date of birth: 28 September 1963 (age 63)
- Place of birth: Igaraçu do Tietê, Brazil
- Height: 1.78 m (5 ft 10 in)
- Position: Forward

Senior career*
| Years | Team | Apps | (Gls) |
| 1981–1984 | Bandeirante | | |
| 1985 | Serra Negra | | |
| 1986 | Sãocarlense | ?? | (4) |
| 1987 | Comercial | | |
| 1988 | Barretos | | |
| 1988 | Votuporanguense | | |
| 1989 | Atlético Paranaense | | |
| 1989 | Figueirense | | |
| 1989–1992 | Santos | 62 | (40) |
| 1992–1993 | Porto | 16 | (1) |
| 1993–1994 | Internacional | | |
| 1994–1995 | Portuguesa | | |
| 1995–1996 | Cruzeiro | | |
| 1996 | Bellmare Hiratsuka | 10 | (2) |
| 1997 | Portuguesa | 4 | (5) |
| 1997 | Fluminense | | |
| 1998 | Atlético Mineiro | | |
| 1998 | Miami Fusion | | |
| 1999 | Santa Cruz | | |

Managerial career
- 2005: Taquaritinga
- 2008: Rio Claro U17
- 2008–2011: Rio Claro
- 2011: Itapirense
- 2012: Rio Claro
- 2012: União São João
- 2012–2013: Capivariano
- 2013: Taubaté
- 2013: Al-Ta'ee
- 2014: Taubaté
- 2015: Uberlândia
- 2015: São José-SP
- 2017: Taubaté
- 2018: Barretos
- 2018: Francana
- 2018: Barretos
- 2019: Taubaté
- 2020: Francana
- 2021: São Caetano
- 2022: Bandeirante
- 2022: Rio Branco-SP
- 2023: Bandeirante
- 2024: Sertãozinho
- 2025: VOCEM
- 2026: Tupã
- * Club domestic league appearances and goals

Paulo César Vieira Rosa (born 28 September 1963), known as Paulinho McLaren or simply Paulinho, is a Brazilian football manager and former player who played as a forward. He is currently under contract with São Caetano.

Paulinho, who was born in Igaraçu do Tietê, Brazil, was top scorer for the 1991 Brazilian Serie A with 15 goals, while he played for Santos FC, and in 1994, he was the top scorer in the Brazil Cup with 6 goals, while he played for Internacional. In 1999, he retired, after playing for Santa Cruz.

He got the nickname McLaren in 1991, when he celebrated a goal after Formula 1 driver Ayrton Senna, who was driving for McLaren at the time.

== Honors ==
Porto

- Primeira Liga: 1992-93
- Supertaça Cândido de Oliveira: 1991

Internacional

- Rio Grande do Sul State Championship: 1994

Cruzeiro

- Gold Cup: 1995
- Brazilian League Top Scorer: 1991
- Brazil Cup Top Scorer: 1994
