= Axel (footballer) =

Brazilian footballer and manager (born 1970)

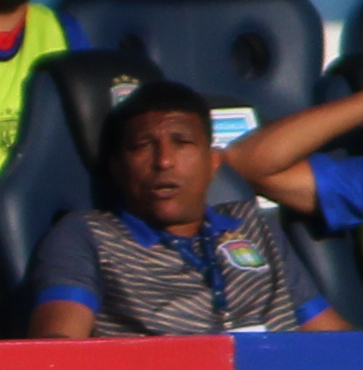
- Axel in 2021

Personal information
- Full name: Axel Rodrigues de Arruda
- Date of birth: 9 January 1970 (age 56)
- Place of birth: Santos, Brazil
- Height: 1.74 m (5 ft 9 in)
- Position: Midfielder

Team information
- Current team: Santos U16 (assistant)

Youth career
- Portuários
- Santos
- Portuguesa Santista
- Santos

Senior career*
Years	Team	Apps	(Gls)
1989–1994	Santos	163	(8)
1994–2000	São Paulo	112	(3)
1997–1998	→ Sevilla (loan)	24	(1)
1998	→ Bahia (loan)		
1999	→ Atlético Paranaense (loan)	15	(0)
2001	Sport Recife	40	(0)
2003	Cerezo Osaka	15	(0)
2004	Portuguesa Santista	10	(0)
2004	Paraná	31	(3)
2005	Figueirense	19	(0)
2006	Campinense		
2007	Portuguesa Santista	6	(0)
2007	Pelotas		
2008	Santacruzense	2	(0)
2009	Jabaquara	12	(2)
2010	Camboriú		

International career
1992	Brazil	1	(0)

Managerial career
- 2011–2012: Jabaquara U17
- 2012–2013: Jabaquara U20
- 2013: Jabaquara
- 2014–2015: Brazil U17 (assistant)
- 2015: Jabaquara
- 2016–2017: Taboão da Serra
- 2017–2018: Taboão da Serra
- 2020–2021: Portuguesa Santista
- 2021–2022: São Caetano (assistant)
- 2022: São Caetano
- 2023–2024: São Caetano
- 2024–2025: Santos U16
- 2025–2026: Santos U17 (assistant)
- 2026: Santos U16
- 2026–: Santos U16 (assistant)
- * Club domestic league appearances and goals

Axel Rodrigues de Arruda (born 9 January 1970), simply known as Axel, is a Brazilian football coach and former player who played as a midfielder. He is the current assistant coach of Santos' under-16 team.

== Club career ==
Born in Santos, São Paulo, Axel began his career with local side Portuários, later moving to the youth sides of Santos and then Portuguesa Santista. After impressing with the under-17 squad of the latter, he returned to Peixe for the under-20 team, and made his senior debut in 1989.

Axel became a starter for Santos in the 1990 season, forming a partnership with César Sampaio in the club's midfield in the following two years. In January 1994, he moved to São Paulo, with Gilberto, Dinho and Macedo moving in the opposite direction. Regularly used in the first campaign, he subsequently lost space and joined Spanish side Sevilla on loan on 21 July 1997.

Upon returning, Axel served loans at Bahia and Atlético Paranaense before returning to São Paulo in 2000. On 31 January 2001, he was presented at Sport Recife. Despite being regularly used, he spent the entire 2002 season without a club after nursing an ankle injury, and had a brief spell at Japanese side Cerezo Osaka in 2003.

Axel played the 2004 Campeonato Paulista for hometown side Portuguesa Santista, before moving to Paraná Clube in the top tier. He represented Figueirense in the following season, and later returned to Briosa in 2007, after another unassuming spell at Campinense.

In 2008, after playing for Pelotas and Santacruzense, Axel announced his retirement, focusing to play only showbol and being named the best player in the category for two consecutive years (2008 and 2009). His performances in showbol led him to return to professional football in 2009 with Jabaquara, and after a brief period at Camboriú,

== International career ==
Axel made his full international debut with the Brazil national team on 23 September 1992, starting in a 4–2 friendly win over Costa Rica.

== Coaching career ==
After retiring, Axel worked in the youth sides of Jabaquara before becoming the head coach of the first team on 1 March 2013. He left at the end of the season, and became an assistant of Cláudio Caçapa and Caio Zanardi in the Brazil national under-15 and under-17 teams, respectively.

After ending his period in the national sides, Axel returned to Jabuca on 19 March 2015, back as head coach. On 5 February 2016, he was announced in charge of Taboão da Serra.

Axel led CATS to a promotion to the Campeonato Paulista Série A3, and spent a period in charge of Guarulhos before returning to Taboão da Serra on 26 July 2017. He left the club after the 2018 Paulista Série A3, and spent a period without a club before taking over Portuguesa Santista on 25 September 2020.

Sacked by Portuguesa on 10 May 2021, Axel became an assistant of Max Sandro at São Caetano fifteen days later. On 29 January 2022, he became the interim head coach of the latter side after Max Sandro was sacked, but remained in charge of the club until 20 October, when he was himself dismissed.

On 19 February 2023, however, Axel returned to Azulão as head coach. He was relieved from his duties on 1 February 2024, after a winless start of the season.

On 2 October 2024, Axel returned to Santos to work as an interim head coach of the under-16 squad, while also working as an assistant of Leandro Zago in the under-20s. In April of the following year, he became an assistant of former teammate César Sampaio in the first team squad, in an interim manner.

== Personal life ==
On 13 February 2022, Axel, his son Daniel and Marquinhos Pitbull (his assistant coach at the time) suffered a domestic accident in his house; Axel and Marquinhos suffered mild burns and were discharged, but Daniel remained hospitalized and deceased on the 22nd. He also has another five children.

== Career statistics ==
=== Club ===
Appearances and goals by club, season and competition
Club	Season	League			State league (Note: Includes Campeonato Paulista)		National cup (Note: Includes Copa do Brasil, Emperor's Cup)		Continental		Other		Total	
Club	Season	Division	Apps	Goals	Apps	Goals	Apps	Goals	Apps	Goals	Apps	Goals	Apps	Goals
Santos	1989	Série A	5	0	3	0	—		0	0	—		8	0
Santos	1990	Série A	19	2	26	1	—		2 (Note: Appearance(s) in Supercopa Libertadores)	0	—		47	3
Santos	1991	Série A	12	0	21	1	—		2	0	—		35	1
Santos	1992	Série A	19	1	27	1	—		2	0	—		48	2
Santos	1993	Série A	13	1	18	1	—		2	0	0	0	33	2
Santos	Total		68	4	95	4	—		8	0	0	0	171	8
São Paulo	1994	Série A	14	2	23	1	—		11 (Note: Eight appearances in Copa Libertadores, three appearances in Supercopa Libertadores)	0	1 (Note: Appearance(s) in Recopa Sudamericana)	0	49	3
São Paulo	1995	Série A	0	0	12	0	2	0	0	0	—		14	0
São Paulo	1996	Série A	15	0	5	0	1	0	2	0	1 (Note: Appearance(s) in Copa de Oro)	0	24	0
São Paulo	1997	Série A	0	0	23	0	4	0	0	0	4 (Note: Appearance(s) in Torneio Rio–São Paulo)	0	31	0
São Paulo	2000	Série A	5	0	15	0	7	0	3 (Note: Appearance(s) in Copa Mercosur)	0	6 (Note: Two appearances in Torneio Rio–São Paulo, four appearances in Copa dos Campeões)	0	36	0
São Paulo	Total		34	2	78	1	14	0	16	0	12	0	154	3
Sevilla (loan)	1997–98	Segunda División	24	1	—		2	0	—		—		26	1
Atlético Paranaense (loan)	1999	Série A	15	0	—		—		—		2 (Note: Appearance(s) in Seletiva para a Libertadores)	0	17	0
Sport Recife	2001	Série A	18	0	22	0	4	0	—		10 (Note: Seven appearances in Copa do Nordeste, three appearances in Copa dos Campeões)	0	54	0
Cerezo Osaka	2003	J.League 1	15	0	—		0	0	—		0	0	15	0
Portuguesa Santista	2004	Série C	0	0	10	0	2	0	—		—		12	0
Paraná	2004	Série A	31	3	—		—		—		—		31	3
Figueirense	2005	Série A	14	0	5	0	7	0	—		—		26	0
Portuguesa Santista	2007	Paulista A2	—		6	0	—		—		—		6	0
Santacruzense	2008	Paulista A3	—		2	0	—		—		—		2	0
Jabaquara	2009	Paulista 2ª Divisão	—		12	2	—		—		—		12	2
Career Total			219	10	230	7	29	0	24	0	24	0	526	17

=== International ===
Brazil national team
Year	Apps	Goals
1992	1	0
Total	1	0

== Honours ==
=== Player ===
São Paulo

- Recopa Sudamericana: 1994
- Campeonato Paulista: 2000
