= Christian Trapasso =

Argentine footballer (1970–2007)

Christian Javier Trapasso (1 June 1970 – 3 October 2007) was an Argentine professional footballer who played as a forward for clubs of Argentina, Chile and Mexico.

== Career ==
- Argentinos Juniors 1989−1992
- Atlante 1993−1994
- Pachuca 1994−1995
- Toros Neza 1995−1996
- Deportes Concepción 1997
- Pachuca 1997−1998
- Atlético San Francisco 1998−1999
