= César Sampaio =

Brazilian footballer (born 1968)

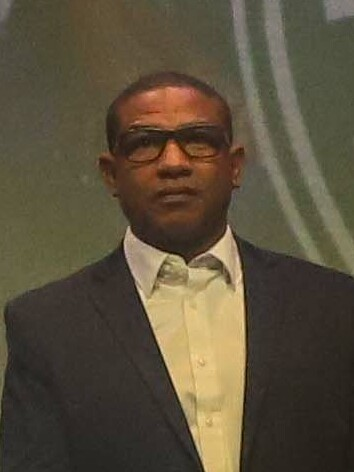
- Sampaio in 2018

Personal information
- Full name: Carlos César Sampaio Campos
- Date of birth: 31 March 1968 (age 58)
- Place of birth: São Paulo, Brazil
- Height: 1.77 m (5 ft 10 in)
- Position: Defensive midfielder

Team information
- Current team: Santos (technical coordinator)

Youth career
- 1983–1986: Santos

Senior career*
Years	Team	Apps	(Gls)
1986–1991	Santos	229	(6)
1991–1994	Palmeiras	161	(17)
1995–1998	Yokohama Flügels	116	(13)
1999–2000	Palmeiras	34	(4)
2000–2001	Deportivo La Coruña	10	(0)
2001	Corinthians	9	(0)
2002	Kashiwa Reysol	26	(3)
2003–2004	Sanfrecce Hiroshima	55	(5)
2004	São Paulo	25	(1)
Total		665	(49)

International career
1987	Brazil U20	5	(0)
1990–2000	Brazil	47	(6)

Managerial career
- 2020–2022: Brazil (assistant)
- 2023–2024: Flamengo (assistant)
- 2025: Santos (assistant)
- 2025: Santos (interim)
- * Club domestic league appearances and goals

Carlos César Sampaio Campos (born 31 March 1968), known as César Sampaio, is a Brazilian football pundit, coach and former player who played as a defensive midfielder. He is the current technical coordinator of Campeonato Brasileiro Série A club Santos.

== Club career ==
Born and raised in Jabaquara, a district of São Paulo, César Sampaio was spotted by Lima and invited to join the youth sides of Santos in 1983. He made his first team debut in 1986, and subsequently established himself as a regular starter.

In July 1991, César Sampaio moved to Palmeiras for a fee of US$ 450,000, with Ranielli and Serginho Fraldinha moving in the opposite direction. An undisputed starter, he won several titles at the club.

In 1995, César Sampaio moved abroad and joined J1 League side Yokohama Flügels. In January 1999, after being close to a move to Vasco da Gama, he returned to Palmeiras, being team captain during the club's 1999 Copa Libertadores title.

In July 2000, César Sampaio joined La Liga side Deportivo de La Coruña. Rarely used and struggling with injuries, he returned to Brazil in October 2001, after being presented at Corinthians.

César Sampaio departed Timão on 7 December 2001, and returned to Japan six days later after signing for Kashiwa Reysol. He later represented Sanfrecce Hiroshima and São Paulo, retiring with the latter in December 2004, aged 36.

== International career ==
César Sampaio joined the Brazil national football team during the Copa América in 1993, also took part at the 1995 edition of the tournament (where they finished as runners-up), but was not part of the team during the FIFA World Cup finals in neither 1990 nor 1994.

He was later also part of the Brazilian squad that won both the Copa América and the FIFA Confederations Cup in 1997, and played for Brazil at the 1998 FIFA World Cup finals, where he made six appearances in the team's run to the final, which they lost to the hosts of the tournament, France. At the 1998 FIFA World Cup finals, formed an effective defensive midfield partnership with Dunga. He became remembered for scoring the first goal of the entire tournament in the 4th minute of Brazil's opening match against Scotland, a header from a corner by Bebeto on the left; this was the fastest goal ever scored in an opening match of the World Cup. He also scored a brace in Brazil's 4–1 victory against Chile in the round of 16 during the same tournament.

Sampaio is also remembered for helping Ronaldo when he suffered a convulsive fit in the night before the 1998 FIFA World Cup final.

== Style of play ==
A hard-working and efficient midfielder, Sampaio has been described by FIFA website as a "modern defensive midfielder who combined being an enforcer with playmaking from deep," and as a player who filled the void left by Dunga as the anchor in Brazil's midfield following his retirement after the 1998 World Cup, by dominating "the engine room." He was neither particularly quick nor flashy in terms of his playing style, however. He was also effective at pressing opponents. In addition to his defensive and creative duties, he was also capable of contributing to the offensive aspect of the game with goals. He is considered to be one of Palmeiras's greatest players ever.

== Post-playing career ==
After retiring, César Sampaio worked as a director of football of Pelotas, Rio Claro and Mogi Mirim. On 4 November 2011, he returned to Palmeiras under the same role, departing on 21 January 2013, after the club's relegation.

César Sampaio was named the director of football of Fortaleza on 23 November 2016, but left his role on 3 March of the following year. In January 2015, he became the president of Comercial do Tietê.

On 22 December 2019, César Sampaio left Comercial to join Tite's staff at the Brazil national team, as his assistant. He was a part of the coaching staff during the 2022 FIFA World Cup, leaving with Tite in late 2022.

In October 2023, César Sampaio moved to Flamengo, again as Tite's assistant; the duo left nearly one month later. On 4 January 2025, he returned to his first club Santos, as permanent assistant coach.

On 14 April 2025, César Sampaio was named interim head coach of Peixe, after Pedro Caixinha was sacked. On his coaching debut two days later, his side defeated Atlético Mineiro 2–0 at home.

Back to his assistant role after the appointment of Cleber Xavier, César Sampaio became a technical coordinator at Santos on 22 August 2025.

== Career statistics ==
=== Club ===
Appearances and goals by club, season and competition
Club	Season	League			State league (Note: Includes Campeonato Paulista)		National cup (Note: Includes Copa do Brasil, Emperor's Cup)		Continental		Other		Total	
Club	Season	Division	Apps	Goals	Apps	Goals	Apps	Goals	Apps	Goals	Apps	Goals	Apps	Goals
Santos	1986	Série A	10	0	22	0	—		—		—		4	0
Santos	1987	Série A	7	0	34	2	—		—		—		41	2
Santos	1988	Série A	15	0	22	1	—		2 (Note: Appearance(s) in Supercopa Libertadores)	0	—		39	1
Santos	1989	Série A	16	0	22	0	—		2	0	—		40	0
Santos	1990	Série A	18	1	34	1	—		1	0	—		53	2
Santos	1991	Série A	17	1	—		—		—		—		17	1
Santos	Total		95	2	134	4	—		5	0	—		234	6
Palmeiras	1991	Série A	—		20	1	—		—		—		20	1
Palmeiras	1992	Série A	18	2	21	5	6	0	—		—		45	7
Palmeiras	1993	Série A	20	2	34	4	6	0	—		3 (Note: Appearance(s) in Torneio Rio–São Paulo)	0	63	6
Palmeiras	1994	Série A	22	1	26	2	3	0	7 (Note: Appearance(s) in Copa Libertadores)	0	—		58	3
Palmeiras	Total		60	5	101	12	15	0	7	0	3	0	186	17
Yokohama Flügels	1995	J1 League	32	0	—		2	1	—		—		34	1
Yokohama Flügels	1996	J1 League	27	5	—		2	0	—		14 (Note: Appearance(s) in J.League Cup)	2	43	7
Yokohama Flügels	1997	J1 League	29	6	—		2	0	—		9	1	40	7
Yokohama Flügels	1998	J1 League	28	2	—		5	0	—		0	0	33	2
Yokohama Flügels	Total		116	13	—		11	1	—		23	3	150	17
Palmeiras	1999	Série A	15	2	9	1	7	0	18 (Note: 11 appearances in Copa Libertadores, seven appearances in Copa Mercosur)	0	4 (Note: Three appearances in Torneio Rio–São Paulo, one appearance in Intercontinental Cup)	0	53	3
Palmeiras	2000	Série A	0	0	10	1	1	0	12	1	9	2	32	4
Palmeiras	Total		15	2	19	2	8	0	30	1	13	2	85	7
Deportivo La Coruña	2000–01	La Liga	10	0	—		1	0	5 (Note: Appearance(s) in UEFA Champions League)	0	—		16	0
Corinthians	2001	Série A	9	0	—		—		—		—		9	0
Kashiwa Reysol	2002	J1 League	26	3	—		0	0	—		6	0	32	3
Sanfrecce Hiroshima	2003	J2 League	41	5	—		4	0	—		—		45	5
Sanfrecce Hiroshima	2004	J2 League	14	0	—		0	0	—		2	0	16	0
Sanfrecce Hiroshima	Total		55	5	—		4	0	—		2	0	61	5
São Paulo	2004	Série A	25	1	—		—		2 (Note: Appearance(s) in Copa Sudamericana)	0	—		27	1
Career Total			411	31	254	18	39	1	49	1	47	5	800	56

=== International ===
Brazil national team
Year	Apps	Goals
1990	1	0
1991	1	0
1992	5	0
1993	4	0
1994	2	0
1995	10	1
1996	0	0
1997	8	1
1998	9	4
1999	0	0
2000	7	0
Total	47	6

Scores and results list Brazil's goal tally first, score column indicates score after each Sampaio goal.

List of international goals scored by César Sampaio
No.	Date	Venue	Opponent	Score	Result	Competition	Ref.
1	9 August 1995	National Stadium, Tokyo, Japan	Japan	4–1	5–1	Friendly	
2	12 December 1997	King Fahd International Stadium, Riyadh, Saudi Arabia	Saudi Arabia	1–0	3–0	1997 FIFA Confederations Cup	
3	25 March 1998	Neckarstadion, Stuttgart, Germany	Germany	1–0	2–1	Friendly	
4	10 June 1998	Stade de France, Saint-Denis, France	Scotland	1–0	2–1	1998 FIFA World Cup	
5	27 June 1998	Parc des Princes, Paris, France	Chile	1–0	4–1	1998 FIFA World Cup	
6	27 June 1998	Parc des Princes, Paris, France	Chile	2–0	4–1	1998 FIFA World Cup	

== Coaching statistics ==
As of 28 April 2025

Coaching record by team and tenure
Team	Nat	From	To	Record								Ref
Team	Nat	From	To	G	W	D	L	GF	GA	GD	Win %	Ref
Santos (interim)	(Brazil)	14 April 2025	29 April 2025	3	1	0	2	4	4	+0	33.33	
Total				3	1	0	2	4	4	+0	33.33	—

== Honours ==
Palmeiras

- Campeonato Brasileiro Série A: 1993, 1994
- Campeonato Paulista: 1993, 1994
- Tournament Rio – São Paulo: 1993, 2000
- Copa Libertadores: 1999
- Copa Mercosur runner-up: 1999
- Intercontinental Cup runner-up: 1999

Yokohama Flügels

- Asian Cup Winners' Cup: 1995
- Asian Super Cup: 1995
- Emperor's Cup: 1998

Deportivo

- Supercopa de España: 2000

Corinthians

- Campeonato Paulista: 2001

Brazil

- Copa América: 1997
- FIFA Confederations Cup: 1997
- FIFA World Cup runner-up: 1998

Individual

- Bola de Ouro: 1990, 1993
- Bola de Prata: 1990, 1993

Sporting positions
Preceded by Jürgen Klinsmann	FIFA World Cup opening goal 1998	Succeeded by Papa Bouba Diop
