= Adolfo Barán =

Uruguayan footballer (born 1961)

Personal information
- Full name: Adolfo Barán Flis
- Date of birth: 22 November 1961 (age 64)
- Place of birth: Montevideo, Uruguay
- Height: 1.85 m (6 ft 1 in)
- Position: Forward

Senior career*
Years	Team	Apps	(Gls)
1980–1982	Rentistas		
1982	→ Cúcuta Deportivo (loan)		
1983–1987	Bella Vista		
1988–1989	Peñarol		
1989	Defensor Sporting		
1990	Peñarol		
1991–1992	Santa Fe	26	(7)
1992–1993	Toshiba SC		
1993	Bella Vista		
1994	Racing Montevideo		
1995	Basáñez		
1995	Everton Viña del Mar	8	(1)
1996	Real España		
1996	Rentistas		
1997	Racing Montevideo		

International career
1981	Uruguay U20	4	(1)
1987–1989	Uruguay	4	(0)

Managerial career
- 2016–2018: Atenas
- Rentistas
- Peñarol
- Racing Montevideo
- 2024–: Villa Teresa
- * Club domestic league appearances and goals

Adolfo Barán Flis (Note: In this Spanish name, the first or paternal surname is Barán and the second or maternal family name is Flis.) (born 22 November 1961) is a Uruguayan football manager and former player.

== Club career ==
Barán was the top goal scorer in the 1990 Uruguayan Primera División season, with 13 goals.

Abroad, he played for Cúcuta Deportivo and Santa Fe in Colombia, Toshiba SC in Japan, Everton in Chile, and Real España in Honduras.

== International career ==
At under-20 level, Barán represented Uruguay in the 1981 South American U20 Championship, where they became the champions.

Barán made four appearances for the senior Uruguay national team from 1987 to 1989.

== Managerial career ==
In April 2024, Barán was appointed manager of Villa Teresa.

== Personal life ==
Baron was born in Montevideo. He is the father of the professional footballers Adolfo Nicolás, Santiago and Agustín Barán.
