= João Paulo (footballer, born 1957) =

Brazilian footballer (born 1957)

Personal information
- Full name: João Paulo de Lima Filho
- Date of birth: 15 June 1957 (age 69)
- Place of birth: Rio de Janeiro, Brazil
- Height: 1.69 m (5 ft 7 in)
- Position: Forward

Senior career*
Years	Team	Apps	(Gls)
1976–1977	São Cristóvão		
1977–1983	Santos FC		
1984	Flamengo		
1985–1989	Corinthians		
1989–1990	Palmeiras		
1990–1991	Yamaha Motors		
1991	São José		
1992	Santos FC		
1992–1993	Náutico		

International career
1983	Brazil	4	(0)
- * Club domestic league appearances and goals

João Paulo de Lima Filho (born 15 June 1957), better known as João Paulo, is a Brazilian former professional footballer who played as a forward. He made four appearances for the Brazil national team in 1983. He was also part of Brazil's squad for the 1979 and 1983 Copa América tournaments.
