= Bandeirante Futebol Clube =

Brazilian football club

Bandeirante
- Full name: Bandeirante Futebol Clube
- Founded: 10 August 1983 (41 years ago)
- Ground: Feijozão
- Capacity: 4,800
- 2005: Alagoano 2ª Divisão, 4th of 10
Home colours	Away colours	colours

Bandeirante Futebol Clube was a Brazilian football club based in Maceió, Alagoas. The team last participated in the Campeonato Alagoano Segunda Divisão in the 2005 season.

== History ==
The club was founded on 10 August 1983.

== Stadium ==
Bandeirante Futebol Clube play their home games at Estádio Nélson Peixoto Feijó, nicknamed Feijozão. The stadium has a maximum capacity of 4,800 people.
