= Márcio Rossini =

Brazilian footballer

Personal information
- Full name: Márcio Antônio Rossini
- Date of birth: 20 September 1960 (age 66)
- Place of birth: Marília, Brazil
- Height: 1.80 m (5 ft 11 in)
- Position: Defender

Senior career*
Years	Team	Apps	(Gls)
1978–1979	Marília	38	(2)
1980–1985	Santos	103	(7)
1986–1989	Bangu	78	(3)
1989	Flamengo	12	(0)
1989	Santos	6	(0)
1990	Internacional	12	(0)
1991	Noroeste	2	(0)
1992	Portuguesa	22	(2)
1993	Tigres UANL	12	(0)
Total		285	(14)

International career
1979–1983	Brazil	13	(1)
- * Club domestic league appearances and goals

Márcio Antônio Rossini, best known as Márcio Rossini (born 20 September 1960) is a Brazilian former footballer who played as a defender, best known for his performances for Santos and the Brazil national team.

== Honours ==
Santos

- Campeonato Paulista: 1984

Individual

- Bola de Prata: 1983
