= Hamilton (footballer, born 1960) =

Brazilian footballer

Personal information
- Full name: Hamilton Lima e Silva
- Date of birth: 22 January 1960 (age 66)
- Place of birth: São Lourenço da Mata, Brazil
- Height: 1.73 m (5 ft 8 in)
- Position: Forward

Youth career
- Sport Recife

Senior career*
Years	Team	Apps	(Gls)
1980	Sport Recife		
1981–1982	Penedense		
1983–1984	CSE		
1984–1985	São Bento		
1985–1986	Portuguesa	35	(5)
1986–1990	Cruzeiro	202	(67)
1990–1991	Internacional		
1991	XV de Jaú		
1992	CRB		
1992	América Mineiro		
1993	Pachuca		
1993–1995	América Mineiro		

Managerial career
- 2022–2023: Cruzeiro (U17)
- * Club domestic league appearances and goals as of 22 February 2024

Hamilton Lima e Silva (born 22 January 1960), simply known as Hamilton, is a Brazilian former professional footballer who played as a forward.

== Career ==
Opportunistic and skilled, Hamilton started his career at Sport, but was unable to find a place. While still young, he played for Penedense and CSE in Alagoas, until he tried his luck in football in São Paulo with EC São Bento. A highlight of the team in the 1985 Campeonato Paulista, he was signed by Portuguesa the following season, making 35 appearances. In 1987 he was state champion with Cruzeiro, a team that made 202 appearances and scored 67 goals, forming an attacking partnership with another Hamilton (de Souza, better known as Careca). He was top scorer in the Minas Gerais championship in 1988, and later in 1993, playing for América Mineiro. He also had an impressive spell at SC Internacional and Pachuca.

Hamilton ended his career in 1995 after suffering a stroke. The player had no consequences, but at the request of his family he abandoned football. In 2022 and 2023, he managed the Cruzeiro EC U17 team.

== Honours ==
Cruzeiro

- Campeonato Mineiro: 1987

CRB

- Campeonato Alagoano: 1992

América

- Campeonato Mineiro: 1993

Individual

- 1988 Campeonato Mineiro top scorer: 16 goals
- 1993 Campeonato Mineiro top scorer: 10 goals
