= Zé Humberto =

Brazilian footballer (1962–2026)

Personal information
- Full name: José Humberto de Oliveira
- Date of birth: 30 July 1962
- Place of birth: Uberaba, Minas Gerais, Brazil
- Date of death: 20 August 2026 (aged 64)
- Place of death: Lavras, Minas Gerais, Brazil
- Position: Midfielder

Youth career
- Uberaba

Senior career*
Years	Team	Apps	(Gls)
1982–1983	Uberaba		
1984	Democrata-GV		
1985	Brasil de Pelotas		
1986	Barretos		
1987	Corinthians-PP		
1987	Uberaba		
1988	Atlético Paranaense		
1988	Barretos		
1989	Figueirense		
1989	Atlético Paranaense		
1990–1991	Santos		
1991–1992	Barretos		
1992–1993	São José-SP		
1994	Itumbiara		
1994	Inter de Limeira		
1995	Portuguesa Santista		
1996	Atlético Sorocaba		

Managerial career
- 1997: Matsubara
- 1998: Grêmio Maringá
- 1998: Matsubara
- 1999: Blumenau
- 1999: Barretos
- 2000: Independente de Limeira
- 2000: Marcílio Dias
- 2001: Ferroviária
- 2001: Oeste
- 2002–2003: Ferroviária
- 2003: Sertãozinho
- 2003: Minaçu-GO
- 2004: São Bento
- 2004: Francana
- 2005: Engenheiro Beltrão
- 2005: Mineiros
- 2006: Anápolis
- 2006: Grêmio Anápolis
- 2006: Uberaba
- 2007: Itumbiara
- 2008: XV de Piracicaba
- 2008–2009: Santa Helena
- 2009: União Rondonópolis
- 2009: Canedense
- 2009: Rio Verde
- 2010: Trindade
- 2010: Grêmio Catanduvense
- 2010: Goianésia
- 2011: Mamoré
- 2011: Goiânia
- 2011: Anápolis
- 2011: Sergipe
- 2011: Trindade
- 2012: Itumbiara
- 2012: Uberlândia
- 2012: Sergipe
- 2013: Palmas
- 2013: Canedense
- 2013: Uberlândia
- 2013: Sergipe
- 2014: Francana
- 2014–2015: Itumbiara
- 2015: Uberaba
- 2016–2018: Atlético Itapemirim
- 2019: Corumbaense
- 2020: Estrela do Norte
- 2020: Olímpia
- 2021: Operário-MT
- 2021: União Rondonópolis
- 2021: Araxá
- 2022: Vitória da Conquista
- 2022: Jataiense
- 2022: Araxá
- 2023: Mamoré
- 2024: Mamoré
- 2025: Vilavelhense
- 2025: Forte
- 2026: Juazeirense
- 2026: Nova Lavras
- * Club domestic league appearances and goals

José Humberto de Oliveira (30 July 1962 – 20 August 2026), mostly known as Zé Humberto, was a Brazilian professional footballer and manager who played as midfielder.

== Player career ==
A native of Uberaba, Zé Humberto started out with his hometown team, standing out particularly for his creative ability to pick out good passes in midfield. He also had notable stints with Athletico Paranaense and Santos.

== Managerial career ==
Zé Humberto began his coaching career with SE Matsubara in 2017 and, over the years, has built one of the longest-running coaching careers in Brazilian football. His most notable achievements include leading Uberaba SC to the Segunda Divisão title in 2015, as well as his successes with Atlético Itapemirim in 2017, winning the Capixaba Championship and the Copa ES, and finishing as runner-up in the 2018 Copa Verde. His last club was Nova Lavras, in the third tier of Minas Gerais.

== Death ==
Zé Humberto fell ill during a Novas Lavras Esporte Clube training session on 20 August 2026. Despite being rushed for emergency care, he was pronounced dead upon arrival at the hospital.

== Honours ==
=== Manager ===
Uberaba

- Campeonato Mineiro Segunda Divisão: 2015

Atlético Itapemirim

- Campeonato Capixaba: 2017
- Copa ES: 2017

Mamoré

- Campeonato Mineiro Segunda Divisão: 2023
