= Sérgio Guedes =

Brazilian footballer and manager

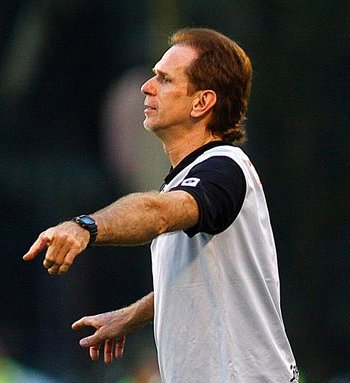
- Guedes in 2010

Personal information
- Full name: Ivanílton Sérgio Guedes
- Date of birth: 7 November 1962 (age 63)
- Place of birth: Rio Claro, Brazil
- Position: Goalkeeper

Team information
- Current team: Portuguesa Santista (head coach)

Youth career
- 1983: Araçatuba

Senior career*
Years	Team	Apps	(Gls)
1984–1989	Ponte Preta		
1989–1993	Santos		
1993	Goiás		
1993	Cruzeiro		
1994	Internacional		
1995	Botafogo-SP		
1996	Lousano Paulista		
1996	Santos		
1997	São José-SP		
1997	Coritiba		
1998–2000	América-SP		
2002	Sãocarlense		
2003	Portuguesa Santista		

International career
1990–1992	Brazil	7	(0)

Managerial career
- 2005–2006: Portuguesa Santista
- 2006: São Carlos
- 2007–2008: Ponte Preta
- 2009: Santo André
- 2009: Bahia
- 2010: São Caetano
- 2010: Portuguesa
- 2010–2011: Americana
- 2011: Red Bull Brasil
- 2012: São Caetano
- 2012: Sport
- 2012–2013: XV de Piracicaba
- 2013: Sport
- 2013: Ceará
- 2013: São Caetano
- 2014: Oeste
- 2014: Santa Cruz
- 2015: Mogi Mirim
- 2016–2017: Rio Claro
- 2018–2020: Portuguesa Santista
- 2020–2022: Água Santa
- 2023–2024: Portuguesa Santista
- 2024: São José-SP
- 2025: Grêmio Prudente
- 2025: Água Santa
- 2026–: Portuguesa Santista
- * Club domestic league appearances and goals

Ivanílton Sérgio Guedes, usually known as Sérgio Guedes (born 7 November 1962), is a Brazilian football coach and former goalkeeper. He is the current head coach of Portuguesa Santista.

== Career ==
Born in Rio Claro, Sérgio Guedes began his football career playing for Araçatuba. Between 1984 and 1989 he played for Ponte Preta, Santos, Goiás and Cruzeiro, winning the Copa do Brasil. In subsequent years he played for many clubs, among others, Botafogo-SP, Lousano Paulista, Santos Coritiba. He ended his playing career with Portuguesa Santista, in 2002.

At the end of their football Sérgio Guedes was a coach. From 2006 he was São Carlos, Ponte Preta, Santo André, Bahia, São Caetano and Portuguesa. In 2014, with the Oeste, where commanded during 6 departures. and in April of that year was for the Santa Cruz, where he left in September of the same year. In June 2015, hit with the Mogi Mirim in order to save lot of sticking in the Série B.

== Honours ==
=== Player ===
Cruzeiro

- Copa do Brasil: 1993

Internacional

- Campeonato Gaúcho: 1994

=== Manager ===
Portuguesa Santista

- Copa Paulista: 2023
