= Marcelo Veiga =

Brazilian footballer and manager (1964–2020)

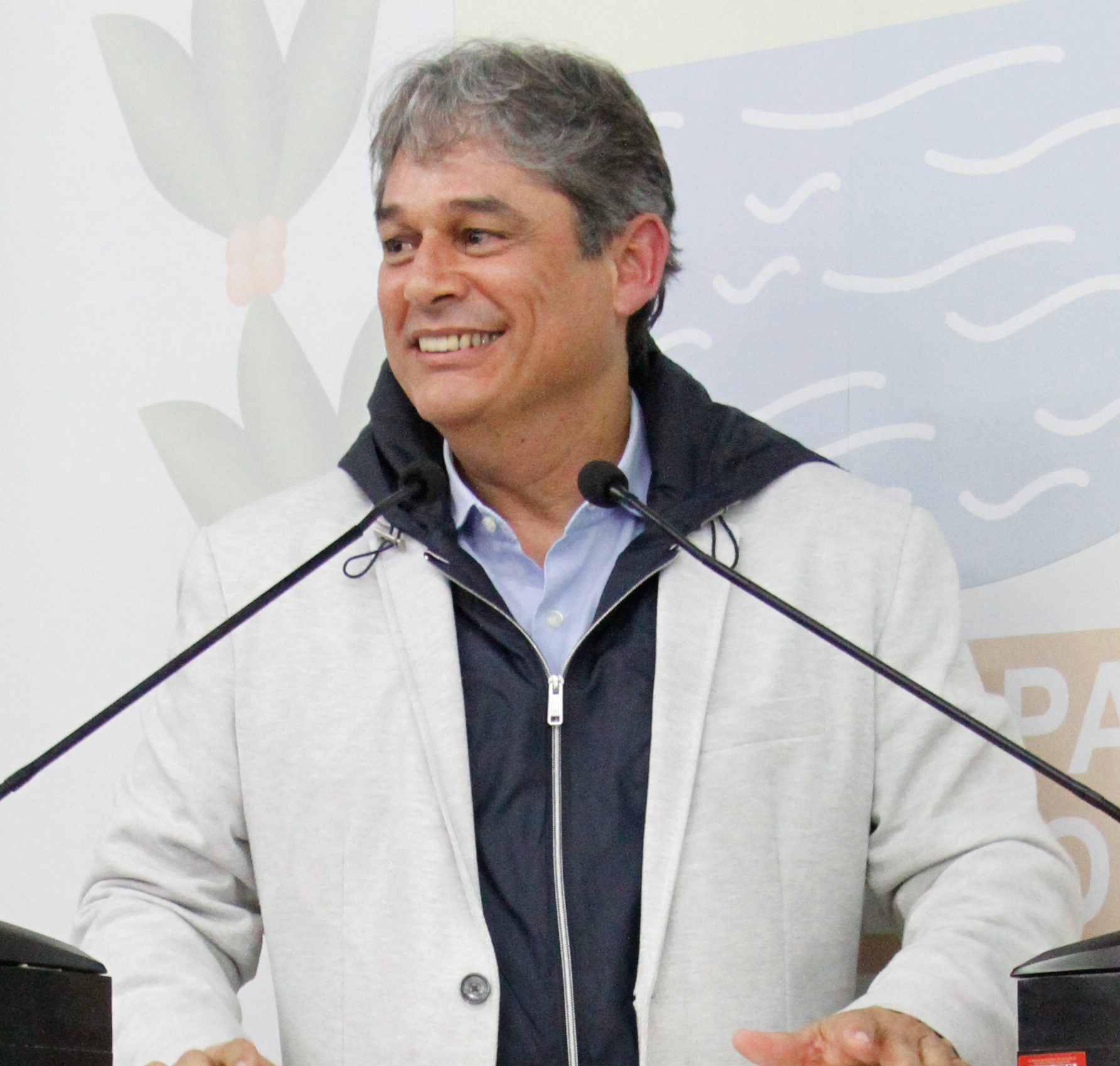
- Veiga in 2019

Personal information
- Full name: Marcelo Castelo Veiga
- Date of birth: 7 October 1964
- Place of birth: São Paulo, Brazil
- Date of death: 14 December 2020 (aged 56)
- Place of death: Bragança Paulista, Brazil
- Position: Left back

Senior career*
| Years | Team | Apps | (Gls) |
| 1982 | Santo André | | |
| 1988–1989 | Ferroviário | | |
| 1989–1991 | Santos | | |
| 1992 | Internacional | | |
| 1993–1994 | Goiás | | |
| 1995 | Bahia | | |
| 1996 | Portuguesa | | |
| 1997 | Fortaleza | | |
| 1997 | Joinville | | |
| 1998 | Atlético Goianiense | | |
| 1999 | Matonense | | |
| 1999 | Itumbiara | | |

Managerial career
- 1999: Matonense
- 1999–2000: Lemense
- 2000: Guaçuano
- 2001: Itumbiara
- 2002–2003: Matonense
- 2003: Taquaritinga
- 2004: Ferroviário
- 2004–2005: Bragantino
- 2005: Portuguesa U20
- 2006: Francana
- 2006–2007: Bragantino
- 2007: Paulista
- 2007: América de Natal
- 2007–2012: Bragantino
- 2012: Remo
- 2012–2013: Botafogo-SP
- 2013: São Caetano
- 2013–2014: Bragantino
- 2014: Portuguesa
- 2014–2015: Guarani
- 2015–2016: Botafogo-SP
- 2016: Remo
- 2016: Bragantino
- 2017: Mogi Mirim
- 2017–2019: Bragantino
- 2019: Ferroviário
- 2020: São Bernardo
- * Club domestic league appearances and goals

Marcelo Castelo Veiga (7 October 1964 – 14 December 2020), commonly known as Marcelo Veiga, was a Brazilian professional football manager and player.

== Biography ==
Veiga enjoyed a seven-year spell in Série A as a player, after representing Santos, Internacional, Goiás, Bahia and Portuguesa. As a manager, his career was mainly associated with Bragantino.

Veiga died on 14 December 2020, aged 56 in Bragança Paulista, after complications from COVID-19 during the COVID-19 pandemic in São Paulo. He was the manager of São Bernardo.

== Managerial statistics ==
As of match played 10 January 2026

Managerial record by team and tenure
| Team | Nat | From | To | Record | | | | | | | |
| Team | Nat | From | To | G | W | D | L | GF | GA | GD | Win % |
|---|---|---|---|---|---|---|---|---|---|---|---|
| Red Bull Bragantino | (Brazil) | 1 January 2005 | 29 April 2007 | 98 | 45 | 26 | 27 | 163 | 106 | +57 | 45.92 |
| Red Bull Bragantino | (Brazil) | 29 August 2007 | 9 August 2012 | 319 | 115 | 89 | 115 | 467 | 437 | +30 | 36.05 |
| Red Bull Bragantino | (Brazil) | 19 September 2013 | 21 May 2014 | 40 | 15 | 7 | 18 | 41 | 53 | −12 | 37.50 |
| Red Bull Bragantino | (Brazil) | 28 June 2016 | 25 October 2016 | 41 | 14 | 7 | 20 | 42 | 51 | −9 | 34.15 |
| Mogi Mirim | (Brazil) | 1 January 2017 | 31 July 2017 | 31 | 7 | 6 | 18 | 41 | 58 | −17 | 22.58 |
| Red Bull Bragantino | (Brazil) | 22 August 2017 | 1 April 2019 | 57 | 19 | 21 | 17 | 57 | 61 | −4 | 33.33 |
| Ferroviário | (Brazil) | 31 July 2019 | 19 September 2019 | 9 | 2 | 3 | 4 | 7 | 10 | −3 | 22.22 |
| São Bernardo | (Brazil) | 16 January 2020 | 14 December 2020 | 30 | 15 | 11 | 4 | 41 | 24 | +17 | 50.00 |
| Total | | | | 628 | 232 | 173 | 223 | 862 | 800 | +62 | 36.94 |

== Honours ==
=== Player ===
Ferroviário

- Campeonato Cearense: 1988

=== Manager ===
Bragantino

- Campeonato Brasileiro Série C: 2007

Botafogo-SP

- Campeonato Brasileiro Série D: 2015
