= Ranielli =

Brazilian footballer

Ranieli
Personal information
- Full name: Ranieli Jose Cechinato
- Date of birth: December 19, 1970 (age 55)
- Place of birth: Curitiba, PR, Brazil
- Height: 1.89 m (6 ft 2 1/2 in)
- Position: Midfielder

Senior career*
Years	Team	Apps	(Gls)
1990–1991	Palmeiras		
1992–1994	Santos		
1995–1996	Botafogo-SP		
1997	Juventus		
1998	Goiás		
1999	Portuguesa Santista		
1999	Ponte Preta		
1999	Avispa Fukuoka		
2000	Sport Recife		
2001	Matonense		
2001	Juventude		
2002	Ituano		
2002	Santa Cruz		
- * Club domestic league appearances and goals

Ranielli Jose Cechinato commonly known as Ranielli (born December 19, 1970) is a former Brazilian football player.

Born in Curitiba, Ranielli began playing football with Caxias. He played for Caxias until he joined Palmeiras in 1990.

== Club statistics ==
Club performance			League		Cup		League Cup		Total	
Season	Club	League	Apps	Goals	Apps	Goals	Apps	Goals	Apps	Goals
Japan			League		Emperor's Cup		J.League Cup		Total	
1999	Avispa Fukuoka	J1 League	1	0	1	0	0	0	2	0
Total			1	0	1	0	0	0	2	0
