= Sérgio Manoel (footballer, born 1972) =

Brazilian footballer

Personal information
- Full name: Sérgio Manoel Júnior
- Date of birth: 2 March 1972 (age 54)
- Place of birth: Santos, Brazil
- Height: 1.75 m (5 ft 9 in)
- Position: Attacking midfielder

Youth career
- Santos

Senior career*
Years	Team	Apps	(Gls)
1989–1992	Santos		
1993	Fluminense		
1993–1994	Santos		
1994–1995	Botafogo		
1996–1997	Cerezo Osaka		
1997–1998	Grêmio		
1998–2000	Botafogo		
2000–2002	Cruzeiro		
2002–2003	Coritiba		
2003	América-RJ		
2003	Portuguesa		
2004	Madureira		
2004	Figueirense		
2004	Independiente		
2005	Marília		
2005	Figueirense		
2005–2006	Volta Redonda		
2006	Botafogo		
2006	Náutico		
2006–2007	Volta Redonda		
2007	Ceilândia		
2007–2008	Ceará		
2008	Bacabal		
2008–2009	Bragantino		
2010	Botafogo-DF		

International career
1991	Brazil U-20	3	(0)
1995–1998	Brazil	4	(0)
- * Club domestic league appearances and goals

Sérgio Manoel Júnior, commonly known simply as Sérgio Manoel (born 2 March 1972), is a former professional association footballer who played as an attacking midfielder for several Campeonato Brasileiro Série A clubs, and the Brazil national team.

== Club career ==
Born in Santos, São Paulo state, Sérgio Manoel started his professional career playing for Santos. He played his first professional game for Santos on November 28, 1989. During his career he played for several clubs, winning the Taça Guanabara with Fluminense in 1993, the Campeonato Brasileiro Série A in 1995 and the Torneio Rio-São Paulo in 1998, with Botafogo, and the Campeonato Catarinense in 2004 with Figueirense. In 2008, he won the Taça Cidade de São Luís with Bacabal, then leaving the club to play with Campeonato Brasileiro Série B club Bragantino.

== International career ==
Sérgio Manoel played three FIFA World Youth Championship games in 1991, respectively against Ivory Coast, Mexico and Sweden, without scoring a goal. Between 1995 and 1998, Sérgio Manoel played five games for the Brazil national team, including two CONCACAF Gold Cup games in 1998, against El Salvador and United States.

== Career statistics ==
=== Club ===
Club performance			League	
Season	Club	League	Apps	Goals
Brazil			League	
1989	Santos	Série A	1	0
1990	Santos	Série A	17	0
1991	Santos	Série A	14	1
1992	Santos	Série A	16	0
1993	Santos	Série A	14	1
1994	Botafogo	Série A	24	1
1995	Botafogo	Série A	25	2
Japan			League	
1996	Cerezo Osaka	J1 League	22	5
1997	Cerezo Osaka	J1 League	11	1
Brazil			League	
1997	Grêmio	Série A	19	2
1998	Botafogo	Série A	21	1
1999	Botafogo	Série A	20	4
2000	Cruzeiro	Série A	19	3
2001	Cruzeiro	Série A	16	0
2002	Coritiba	Série A	6	0
2003	América	Série C	11	1
2003	Portuguesa Desportos	Série B	10	1
2004	Figueirense	Série A	15	7
Argentina			League	
2004	Independiente	Primera A	4	0
Brazil			League	
2005	Marília	Série B	0	0
2005	Figueirense	Série A	9	0
2006	Volta Redonda		0	0
2006	Náutico Capibaribe	Série B	11	0
2006	Botafogo	Série A	8	0
2007	Ceilândia	Série C	0	0
2007	Ceará	Série B	22	4
2008	Bacabal		0	0
2008	Bragantino	Série B	23	4
2009	Bragantino	Série B	8	1
2010	Bragantino	Série B		
Country	Brazil		329	34
Country	Japan		33	6
Country	Argentina		4	0
Total			366	40

=== International ===
Brazil national team
Year	Apps	Goals
1995	1	0
1996	1	0
1997	0	0
1998	2	0
Total	4	0
