= Almir (footballer, born 1969) =

Brazilian footballer

Personal information
- Full name: Almir de Souza Fraga
- Date of birth: 26 March 1969 (age 57)
- Place of birth: Porto Alegre, Brazil
- Height: 1.75 m (5 ft 9 in)
- Position: Striker

Senior career*
Years	Team	Apps	(Gls)
1988–1989	Grêmio	18	(0)
1990–1993	Santos	74	(13)
1994–1996	Bellmare Hiratsuka	68	(17)
1995	→ São Paulo (loan)	16	(6)
1997	Atlético Mineiro	24	(4)
1998	Palmeiras	15	(1)
1999	Internacional	13	(1)
1999–2000	Gaziantepspor	14	(2)
2000	Sport Recife	19	(0)
2001	São Caetano	6	(0)
2001–2003	Gallos Blancos Querétaro	34	(7)
2003–2004	Atlas	11	(0)
2004	Lobos	?	(?)
2005	Ulbra	?	(?)
2006–2008	Porto Alegre	?	(?)
2008	Mogi Mirim	?	(?)
Total		312	(51)

International career
1990–1993	Brazil	6	(0)
- * Club domestic league appearances and goals

Almir de Souza Fraga (born 26 March 1969), known as Almir, is a Brazilian former footballer who played as a striker.

He represented the Brazilian national side in six international games between 1990 and 1993.

== Career statistics ==
=== Club ===
Club performance			League		Cup		League Cup		Total	
Season	Club	League	Apps	Goals	Apps	Goals	Apps	Goals	Apps	Goals
Japan			League		Emperor's Cup		J.League Cup		Total	
1994	Bellmare Hiratsuka	J1 League	38	7	4	0	1	0	43	7
1995	Bellmare Hiratsuka	J1 League	21	8	0	0	-		21	8
1996	Bellmare Hiratsuka	J1 League	9	2	3	1	0	0	12	3
Total			68	17	7	1	1	0	76	18

=== International ===
Brazil national team
Year	Apps	Goals
1990	1	0
1991	1	0
1992	1	0
1993	3	0
Total	6	0

== Honours ==
Grêmio

- Copa do Brasil: 1989

São Paulo

- Copa Master de CONMEBOL: 1996

Atlético Mineiro

- Copa Conmebol: 1997
- Copa Centenário de Belo Horizonte: 1997

Palmeiras

- Copa do Brasil: 1998
- Copa Mercosur: 1998

Sport

- Campeonato Pernambucano: 2000
