= Grêmio Esportivo Sãocarlense =

Sãocarlense
- Full name: Grêmio Esportivo Sãocarlense
- Nickname(s): Lobo da Central; Grêmio; Tricolor
- Founded: 19 March 1976; 49 years ago
- Ground: Luís Augusto de Oliveira; São Carlos, São Paulo State, Brazil
- Capacity: 10,000
- 2004: Paulista Série A3, 16th of 16 (relegated)
Home colours

Grêmio Esportivo Sãocarlense, is a country club and an amateur football club from São Carlos in São Paulo state, Brazil. From 1976 to 2004, they were a professional club.

O Clube (lit. 'The Club'), as is known locally was founded on March 19, 1976. Their football team played in red, blue and white uniforms.

== History ==
The club were founded on March 19, 1976. They competed in the Campeonato Paulista from 1990 to 1992, and closed their professional football department in 2004.

== Achievements ==
- Campeonato Paulista Terceira Divisão (champion and access for Second division): 1989

== Stadium ==
Grêmio Esportivo Sãocarlense played their matches at Estádio Luisão located in downtown São Carlos, inaugurated in 1968. The stadium has a maximum capacity of 10,000 people.

== Trivia ==
- The club's mascot is a wolf.
- Grêmio Esportivo Sãocarlense is the only São Carlos's club to reach amateur in 2009.
