= Brazil national football team results (1990–2009) =

Brazilian football team results

This page details the match results and statistics of the Brazil national football team from 1990 to 2009.

== Key ==
Key to matches

- Att.=Match attendance
- (H)=Home ground
- (A)=Away ground
- (N)=Neutral ground

Key to record by opponent

- Pld=Games played
- W=Games won
- D=Games drawn
- L=Games lost
- GF=Goals for
- GA=Goals against

== Results ==
Brazil's score is shown first in each case.

No.	Date	Venue	Opponents	Score	Competition	Brazil scorers	Att.	Ref.
528	28 March 1990	Wembley Stadium (1923), London (A)	England	0–1	Friendly		80,000	
529	5 May 1990	Estádio Brinco de Ouro, Campinas (H)	Bulgaria	2–1	Friendly	Müller, Aldair	47,132	
530	13 May 1990	Maracanã Stadium, Rio de Janeiro (H)	East Germany	3–3	Friendly	Alemão, Careca, Dunga	67,609	
531	10 June 1990	Stadio delle Alpi, Turin (N)	Sweden	2–1	1990 FIFA World Cup	Careca (2)	62,628	
532	16 June 1990	Stadio delle Alpi, Turin (N)	Costa Rica	1–0	1990 FIFA World Cup	Müller	58,007	
533	20 June 1990	Stadio delle Alpi, Turin (N)	Scotland	1–0	1990 FIFA World Cup	Müller	62,502	
534	24 June 1990	Stadio delle Alpi, Turin (N)	Argentina	0–1	1990 FIFA World Cup		61,381	
535	12 September 1990	El Molinón, Gijón (A)	Spain	0–3	Friendly		12,000	
536	17 October 1990	Estadio Nacional, Santiago (A)	Chile	0–0	Friendship Trophy		37,000	
537	8 October 1990	Mangueirão, Belém (H)	Chile	0–0	Friendship Trophy		33,664	
538	12 December 1990	Los Angeles Memorial Coliseum, Los Angeles (N)	Mexico	0–0	Friendly		25,000	
539	27 February 1991	Estádio Pedro Pedrossian, Campo Grande (H)	Paraguay	1–1	Friendly	Neto	32,500	
540	27 March 1991	José Amalfitani Stadium, Buenos Aires (A)	Argentina	3–3	Friendly	Renato Gaúcho, Luís Henrique, Careca II	50,000	
541	17 April 1991	Estádio do Café, Londrina (H)	Romania	1–0	Friendly	Moacir	—	
542	28 May 1991	Estádio Parque do Sabiá, Uberlândia (H)	Bulgaria	3–0	Friendly	Neto (2), João Paulo	25,000	
543	27 June 1991	Pinheirão, Curitiba (H)	Argentina	1–1	Friendly	Neto	44,429	
544	9 July 1991	Estadio Sausalito, Viña del Mar (N)	Bolivia	2–1	1991 Copa América	Neto, Branco	18,000	
545	11 July 1991	Estadio Sausalito, Viña del Mar (N)	Uruguay	1–1	1991 Copa América	João Paulo	15,000	
546	13 July 1991	Estadio Sausalito, Viña del Mar (N)	Colombia	0–2	1991 Copa América		15,000	
547	15 July 1991	Estadio Sausalito, Viña del Mar (N)	Ecuador	3–1	1991 Copa América	Mazinho Oliveira, Márcio Santos, Luís Henrique	30,000	
548	17 July 1991	Estadio Nacional, Santiago (N)	Argentina	2–3	1991 Copa América	Branco, João Paulo	50,000	
549	19 July 1991	Estadio Nacional, Santiago (N)	Colombia	2–0	1991 Copa América	Renato Gaúcho, Branco	75,000	
550	21 July 1991	Estadio Nacional, Santiago (N)	Chile	2–0	1991 Copa América	Mazinho Oliveira, Luís Henrique	30,000	
551	11 September 1991	Cardiff Arms Park, Cardiff (A)	Wales	0–1	Friendly		20,000	
552	30 October 1991	Melão, Varginha (H)	Yugoslavia	3–1	Friendly	Luís Henrique, Raí, Müller	10,000	
553	18 December 1991	Estádio Serra Dourada, Goiânia (H)	Czechoslovakia	2–1	Friendly	Elivélton, Raí	38,000	
554	26 February 1992	Castelão, Fortaleza (H)	United States	3–0	Friendly	Antônio Carlos, Raí (2)	40,000	
555	15 April 1992	Verdão, Cuiabá (H)	Finland	3–1	Friendly	Bebeto (2), Paulo Sérgio	25,000	
556	30 April 1992	Estadio Centenario, Montevideo (A)	Uruguay	0–1	Friendly		20,000	
557	17 May 1992	Wembley Stadium (1923), London (A)	England	1–1	Friendly	Bebeto	53,428	
558	31 July 1992	Los Angeles Memorial Coliseum, Los Angeles (N)	Mexico	5–0	Friendship Cup	Bebeto (2), Renato Gaúcho, Zinho, Paulo Sérgio	28,651	
559	2 August 1992	Los Angeles Memorial Coliseum, Los Angeles (N)	United States	1–0	Friendship Cup	Bebeto	17,021	
560	26 August 1992	Parc des Princes, Paris (A)	France	2–0	Friendly	Raí, Luís Henrique	34,428	
561	23 September 1992	Felipão, Paranavaí (H)	Costa Rica	4–2	Friendly	Raí (3), Renato Gaúcho	22,458	
562	25 November 1992	Amigão, Campina Grande (H)	Uruguay	1–2	Friendly	Edmundo	18,000	
563	16 December 1992	Estádio Beira-Rio, Porto Alegre (H)	Germany	3–1	Friendly	Luís Henrique, Bebeto, Jorginho	50,000	
564	18 February 1993	Estadio Monumental, Buenos Aires (A)	Argentina	1–1	AFA Centenary Cup	Luís Henrique	65,000	
565	17 March 1993	Estádio Santa Cruz, Ribeirão Preto (H)	Poland	2–2	Friendly	Świerczewski (o.g.), Müller	50,000	
566	6 June 1993	Yale Bowl, New Haven (N)	United States	2–0	1993 U.S. Cup	Careca, Winck	44,579	
567	10 June 1993	Robert F. Kennedy Memorial Stadium, Washington, D.C. (N)	Germany	3–3	1993 U.S. Cup	Helmer (o.g.), Careca, Luisinho	34,737	
568	13 June 1993	Robert F. Kennedy Memorial Stadium, Washington, D.C. (N)	England	1–1	1993 U.S. Cup	Márcio Santos	54,118	
569	18 June 1993	Estadio Alejandro Serrano Aguilar, Cuenca (N)	Peru	0–0	1993 Copa América		20,000	
570	21 June 1993	Estadio Alejandro Serrano Aguilar, Cuenca (N)	Chile	2–3	1993 Copa América	Müller, Palhinha	23,000	
571	24 June 1993	Estadio Alejandro Serrano Aguilar, Cuenca (N)	Paraguay	3–0	1993 Copa América	Palhinha (2), Edmundo	20,000	
572	27 June 1993	Estadio Monumental, Guayaquil (N)	Argentina	1–1 (a.e.t.) (5–6p)	1993 Copa América	Müller	25,000	
573	14 July 1993	Estádio São Januário, Rio de Janeiro (H)	Paraguay	2–0	Friendly	Branco, Bebeto	40,000	
574	18 July 1993	Estadio Monumental, Guayaquil (A)	Ecuador	0–0	1994 FIFA World Cup qualification		40,000	
575	25 July 1993	Estadio Hernando Siles, La Paz (A)	Bolivia	0–2	1994 FIFA World Cup qualification		45,000	
576	1 August 1993	Estadio Polideportivo de Pueblo Nuevo, San Cristóbal (A)	Venezuela	5–1	1994 FIFA World Cup qualification	Raí, Bebeto (2), Branco, Palhinha	15,000	
577	8 August 1993	Estádio Rei Pelé, Maceió (H)	Mexico	1–1	Friendly	Márcio Santos	18,778	
578	15 August 1993	Estadio Centenario, Montevideo (A)	Uruguay	1–1	1994 FIFA World Cup qualification	Bebeto	55,000	
579	22 August 1993	Estádio do Morumbi, São Paulo (H)	Ecuador	2–0	1994 FIFA World Cup qualification	Bebeto, Dunga	78,000	
580	29 August 1993	Estádio do Arruda, Recife (H)	Bolivia	6–0	1994 FIFA World Cup qualification	Raí, Müller, Bebeto (2), Branco, Ricardo Gomes	72,000	
581	5 September 1993	Mineirão, Belo Horizonte (H)	Venezuela	4–0	1994 FIFA World Cup qualification	Ricardo Gomes (2), Palhinha, Evair	64,000	
582	19 September 1993	Maracanã Stadium, Rio de Janeiro (H)	Uruguay	2–0	1994 FIFA World Cup qualification	Romário (2)	101,533	
583	17 November 1993	Müngersdorfer Stadion, Cologne (A)	Germany	1–2	Friendly	Evair	51,000	
584	16 December 1993	Estadio Jalisco, Guadalajara (A)	Mexico	1–0	Friendly	Rivaldo	—	
585	23 March 1994	Estádio do Arruda, Recife (H)	Argentina	2–0	Friendly	Bebeto (2)	85,000	
586	4 May 1994	Estádio da Ressacada, Florianópolis (H)	Iceland	3–0	Friendly	Ronaldo, Zinho, Viola	23,000	
587	5 June 1994	Commonwealth Stadium, Edmonton (A)	Canada	1–1	Friendly	Romário	51,922	
588	8 June 1994	San Diego Stadium, San Diego (N)	Honduras	8–2	Friendly	Romário (3), Bebeto (2), Cafu, Dunga, Raí	21,320	
589	12 June 1994	Bulldog Stadium, Fresno (N)	El Salvador	4–0	Friendly	Romário, Bebeto, Zinho, Raí	13,210	
590	20 June 1994	Stanford Stadium, Stanford (N)	Russia	2–0	1994 FIFA World Cup	Romário, Raí	81,061	
591	24 June 1994	Stanford Stadium, Stanford (N)	Cameroon	3–0	1994 FIFA World Cup	Romário, Márcio Santos, Bebeto	83,401	
592	28 June 1994	Pontiac Silverdome, Pontiac (N)	Sweden	1–1	1994 FIFA World Cup	Romário	77,217	
593	4 July 1994	Stanford Stadium, Stanford (N)	United States	1–0	1994 FIFA World Cup	Bebeto	84,147	
594	9 July 1994	Cotton Bowl, Dallas (N)	Netherlands	3–2	1994 FIFA World Cup	Romário, Bebeto, Branco	63,500	
595	13 July 1994	Rose Bowl, Pasadena (N)	Sweden	1–0	1994 FIFA World Cup	Romário	91,856	
596	17 July 1994	Rose Bowl, Pasadena (N)	Italy	0–0 (a.e.t.) (3–2p)	1994 FIFA World Cup		94,194	
597	23 December 1994	Estádio Olímpico Monumental, Porto Alegre (H)	FR Yugoslavia	2–0	Friendly	Viola, Branco	38,000	
598	22 February 1995	Castelão, Fortaleza (H)	Slovakia	5–0	Friendly	Souza, Bebeto (2), Túlio, Márcio Santos	80,000	
599	29 March 1995	Estádio Serra Dourada, Goiânia (H)	Honduras	1–1	Friendly	Túlio	40,000	
600	17 May 1995	Ramat Gan Stadium, Ramat Gan (A)	Israel	2–1	Friendly	Túlio, Rivaldo	28,000	
601	4 June 1995	Villa Park, Birmingham (N)	Sweden	1–0	Umbro Cup	Edmundo	20,131	
602	6 June 1995	Goodison Park, Liverpool (N)	Japan	3–0	Umbro Cup	Roberto Carlos, Zinho (2)	29,327	
603	11 June 1995	Wembley Stadium (1923), London (N)	England	3–1	Umbro Cup	Juninho Paulista, Ronaldo, Edmundo	67,318	
604	29 June 1995	Estádio do Arruda, Recife (H)	Poland	2–1	Friendly	Túlio (2)	35,000	
605	7 July 1995	Estadio Atilio Paiva Olivera, Rivera (N)	Ecuador	1–0	1995 Copa América	Ronaldão	10,000	
606	10 July 1995	Estadio Atilio Paiva Olivera, Rivera (N)	Peru	2–0	1995 Copa América	Zinho, Edmundo	8,000	
607	13 July 1995	Estadio Atilio Paiva Olivera, Rivera (N)	Colombia	3–0	1995 Copa América	Leonardo, Túlio, Higuita (o.g.)	10,000	
608	17 July 1995	Estadio Atilio Paiva Olivera, Rivera (N)	Argentina	2–2 (4–2p)	1995 Copa América	Edmundo, Túlio	24,000	
609	20 July 1995	Estadio Campus Municipal, Maldonado (N)	United States	1–0	1995 Copa América	Aldair	8,000	
610	23 July 1995	Estadio Centenario, Montevideo (N)	Uruguay	1–1 (3–5p)	1995 Copa América	Túlio	60,000	
611	9 August 1995	National Stadium, Tokyo (A)	Japan	5–1	Friendly	Kojima (o.g.), Edmundo, Leonardo, César Sampaio, Sávio	53,605	
612	12 August 1995	Suwon Sports Complex, Suwon (A)	South Korea	1–0	Friendly	Dunga	35,271	
613	11 October 1995	Estádio Fonte Nova, Salvador (H)	Uruguay	2–0	Friendly	Ronaldo (2)	—	
614	8 November 1995	Estadio Monumental, Buenos Aires (A)	Argentina	1–0	Copa 50imo Aniversario de Clarín	Donizete	60,000	
615	20 December 1995	Vivaldão, Manaus (H)	Colombia	3–1	Friendly	Túlio (2), Carlinhos	35,000	
616	12 January 1996	Los Angeles Memorial Coliseum, Los Angeles (N)	Canada	4–1	1996 CONCACAF Gold Cup	André Luiz, Caio, Sávio, Machado	8,234	
617	14 January 1996	Los Angeles Memorial Coliseum, Los Angeles (N)	Honduras	5–0	1996 CONCACAF Gold Cup	Caio (2), Jamelli (2), Sávio	20,708	
618	18 January 1996	Los Angeles Memorial Coliseum, Los Angeles (N)	United States	1–0	1996 CONCACAF Gold Cup	Balboa (o.g.)	22,038	
619	21 January 1996	Los Angeles Memorial Coliseum, Los Angeles (N)	Mexico	0–2	1996 CONCACAF Gold Cup		88,155	
620	27 March 1996	Teixeirão, São José do Rio Preto (H)	Ghana	8–2	Friendly	Zé Maria, Sávio, André Luiz, Marques (2), Rivaldo, Alexandre Lopes, Luizão	20,000	
621	24 April 1996	FNB Stadium, Johannesburg (A)	South Africa	3–2	Friendly	Flávio Conceição, Rivaldo, Bebeto	80,000	
622	28 August 1996	Dynamo Stadium, Moscow (A)	Russia	2–2	Friendly	Donizete, Ronaldo	25,000	
623	31 August 1996	Amsterdam ArenA, Amsterdam (A)	Netherlands	2–2	Friendly	Giovanni, Gonçalves	27,500	
624	16 October 1996	Albertão, Teresina (H)	Lithuania	3–1	Friendly	Ronaldo (3)	60,000	
625	13 November 1996	Pinheirão, Curitiba (H)	Cameroon	2–0	Friendly	Giovanni, Djalminha	26,238	
626	18 December 1996	Vivaldão, Manaus (H)	Bosnia and Herzegovina	1–0	Friendly	Ronaldo	20,000	
627	26 February 1997	Estádio Serra Dourada, Goiânia (H)	Poland	4–2	Friendly	Giovanni (2), Ronaldo (2)	65,000	
628	2 April 1997	Estádio Nacional Mané Garrincha, Brasília (H)	Chile	4–0	Friendly	Ronaldo (2), Romário (2)	45,000	
629	30 April 1997	Miami Orange Bowl, Miami (N)	Mexico	4–0	Friendly	Leonardo, Romário (3)	51,500	
630	30 May 1997	Ullevaal Stadion, Oslo (A)	Norway	2–4	Friendly	Djalminha, Romário	21,799	
631	3 June 1997	Stade de Gerland, Lyon (N)	France	1–1	1997 Tournoi de France	Roberto Carlos	30,000	
632	8 June 1997	Stade de Gerland, Lyon (N)	Italy	3–3	1997 Tournoi de France	Lombardo (o.g.), Ronaldo, Romário	33,000	
633	10 June 1997	Parc des Princes, Paris (N)	England	1–0	1997 Tournoi de France	Romário	50,000	
634	13 June 1997	Estadio Ramón Tahuichi Aguilera, Santa Cruz de la Sierra (N)	Costa Rica	5–0	1997 Copa América	Djalminha, González (o.g.), Ronaldo (2), Romário	35,000	
635	16 June 1997	Estadio Ramón Tahuichi Aguilera, Santa Cruz de la Sierra (N)	Mexico	3–2	1997 Copa América	Aldair, Romero (o.g.), Leonardo	35,000	
636	19 June 1997	Estadio Ramón Tahuichi Aguilera, Santa Cruz de la Sierra (N)	Colombia	2–0	1997 Copa América	Dunga, Edmundo	35,000	
637	22 June 1997	Estadio Ramón Tahuichi Aguilera, Santa Cruz de la Sierra (N)	Paraguay	2–0	1997 Copa América	Ronaldo (2)	30,000	
638	26 June 1997	Estadio Ramón Tahuichi Aguilera, Santa Cruz de la Sierra (N)	Peru	7–0	1997 Copa América	Denílson, Flávio Conceição, Romário (2), Leonardo (2), Djalminha	20,000	
639	29 June 1997	Estadio Hernando Siles, La Paz (N)	Bolivia	3–1	1997 Copa América	Edmundo, Ronaldo, Zé Roberto	46,000	
640	10 August 1997	Seoul Olympic Stadium, Seoul (A)	South Korea	2–1	Friendly	Ronaldo, Anderson	60,000	
641	13 August 1997	Nagai Stadium, Osaka (A)	Japan	3–0	Friendly	Flávio Conceição (2), Júnior Baiano	45,754	
642	10 September 1997	Estádio Fonte Nova, Salvador (H)	Ecuador	4–2	Friendly	Denílson, Dodô (2), Emerson	40,000	
643	9 October 1997	Mangueirão, Belém (H)	Morocco	2–0	Friendly	Denílson (2)	45,000	
644	11 November 1997	Estádio Nacional Mané Garrincha, Brasília (H)	Wales	3–0	Friendly	Zinho, Rivaldo, Rodrigo Fabri	30,000	
645	7 December 1997	Ellis Park Stadium, Johannesburg (A)	South Africa	2–1	Friendly	Romário, Bebeto	45,000	
646	12 December 1997	King Fahd International Stadium, Riyadh (N)	Saudi Arabia	3–0	1997 FIFA Confederations Cup	César Sampaio, Romário (2)	45,000	
647	14 December 1997	King Fahd International Stadium, Riyadh (N)	Australia	0–0	1997 FIFA Confederations Cup		15,000	
648	16 December 1997	King Fahd International Stadium, Riyadh (N)	Mexico	3–2	1997 FIFA Confederations Cup	Romário, Denílson, Júnior Baiano	20,000	
649	19 December 1997	King Fahd International Stadium, Riyadh (N)	Czech Republic	2–0	1997 FIFA Confederations Cup	Romário, Ronaldo	28,000	
650	21 December 1997	King Fahd International Stadium, Riyadh (N)	Australia	6–0	1997 FIFA Confederations Cup	Romário (3), Ronaldo (3)	65,000	
651	3 February 1998	Miami Orange Bowl, Miami (N)	Jamaica	0–0	1998 CONCACAF Gold Cup		43,754	
652	5 February 1998	Miami Orange Bowl, Miami (N)	Guatemala	1–1	1998 CONCACAF Gold Cup	Romário	17,842	
653	8 February 1998	Los Angeles Memorial Coliseum, Los Angeles (N)	El Salvador	4–0	1998 CONCACAF Gold Cup	Edmundo, Romário, Élber (2)	55,027	
654	10 February 1998	Los Angeles Memorial Coliseum, Los Angeles (N)	United States	0–1	1998 CONCACAF Gold Cup		12,298	
655	15 February 1998	Los Angeles Memorial Coliseum, Los Angeles (N)	Jamaica	1–0	1998 CONCACAF Gold Cup	Romário	91,255	
656	25 March 1998	Gottlieb-Daimler-Stadion, Stuttgart (A)	Germany	2–1	Friendly	César Sampaio, Ronaldo	58,000	
657	29 April 1998	Maracanã Stadium, Rio de Janeiro (H)	Argentina	0–1	Friendly		99,697	
658	3 June 1998	Stade de Paris, Saint-Ouen-sur-Seine (N)	Andorra	3–0	Friendly	Giovanni, Rivaldo, Cafu	5,500	
659	10 June 1998	Stade de France, Saint-Denis (N)	Scotland	2–1	1998 FIFA World Cup	César Sampaio, Boyd (o.g.)	80,000	
660	16 June 1998	Stade de la Beaujoire, Nantes (N)	Morocco	3–0	1998 FIFA World Cup	Ronaldo, Rivaldo, Bebeto	35,500	
661	23 June 1998	Stade Vélodrome, Marseille (N)	Norway	1–2	1998 FIFA World Cup	Bebeto	55,000	
662	27 June 1998	Parc des Princes, Paris (N)	Chile	4–1	1998 FIFA World Cup	César Sampaio (2), Ronaldo (2)	45,500	
663	3 July 1998	Stade de la Beaujoire, Nantes (N)	Denmark	3–2	1998 FIFA World Cup	Bebeto, Rivaldo (2)	35,500	
664	7 July 1998	Stade Vélodrome, Marseille (N)	Netherlands	1–1 (a.e.t.) (4–2p)	1998 FIFA World Cup	Ronaldo	54,000	
665	12 July 1998	Stade de France, Saint-Denis (N)	France	0–3	1998 FIFA World Cup		80,000	
666	23 September 1998	Castelão, São Luís (H)	FR Yugoslavia	1–1	Friendly	Marcelinho Carioca	70,100	
667	14 October 1998	Robert F. Kennedy Memorial Stadium, Washington, D.C. (N)	Ecuador	5–1	Friendly	Marcelinho Carioca, Élber (3), Cafu	18,116	
668	18 November 1998	Castelão, Fortaleza (H)	Russia	5–1	Friendly	Élber, Amoroso (2), Rivaldo, Marcos Assunção	40,000	
669	28 March 1999	Seoul Olympic Stadium, Seoul (A)	South Korea	0–1	Friendly		75,000	
670	31 March 1999	National Stadium, Tokyo (A)	Japan	2–0	Friendly	Amoroso, Emerson	53,903	
671	5 June 1999	Estádio Fonte Nova, Salvador (H)	Netherlands	2–2	Friendly	Amoroso, Giovanni	50,000	
672	8 June 1999	Estádio Serra Dourada, Goiânia (H)	Netherlands	3–1	Friendly	Amoroso, F. de Boer (o.g.), Leonardo	10,000	
673	26 June 1999	Arena da Baixada, Curitiba (H)	Latvia	3–0	Friendly	Alex, Roberto Carlos, Ronaldo	30,000	
674	30 June 1999	Estadio Antonio Oddone Sarubbi, Ciudad del Este (N)	Venezuela	7–0	1999 Copa América	Ronaldo (2), Emerson, Amoroso (2), Ronaldinho, Rivaldo	20,000	
675	3 July 1999	Estadio Antonio Oddone Sarubbi, Ciudad del Este (N)	Mexico	2–1	1999 Copa América	Amoroso, Alex	25,000	
676	6 July 1999	Estadio Antonio Oddone Sarubbi, Ciudad del Este (N)	Chile	1–0	1999 Copa América	Ronaldo	10,000	
677	11 July 1999	Estadio Antonio Oddone Sarubbi, Ciudad del Este (N)	Argentina	2–1	1999 Copa América	Rivaldo, Ronaldo	25,000	
678	14 July 1999	Estadio Antonio Oddone Sarubbi, Ciudad del Este (N)	Mexico	2–0	1999 Copa América	Amoroso, Rivaldo	10,000	
679	18 July 1999	Estadio Defensores del Chaco, Asunción (N)	Uruguay	3–0	1999 Copa América	Rivaldo (2), Ronaldo	30,000	
680	24 July 1999	Estadio Jalisco, Guadalajara (N)	Germany	4–0	1999 FIFA Confederations Cup	Zé Roberto, Ronaldinho, Alex (2)	60,000	
681	28 July 1999	Estadio Jalisco, Guadalajara (N)	United States	1–0	1999 FIFA Confederations Cup	Ronaldinho	54,000	
682	30 July 1999	Estadio Jalisco, Guadalajara (N)	New Zealand	2–0	1999 FIFA Confederations Cup	Marcos Paulo, Ronaldinho	53,000	
683	1 August 1999	Estadio Jalisco, Guadalajara (N)	Saudi Arabia	8–2	1999 FIFA Confederations Cup	João Carlos, Ronaldinho (3), Zé Roberto, Alex (2), Rôni	48,000	
684	4 August 1999	Estadio Azteca, Mexico City (N)	Mexico	3–4	1999 FIFA Confederations Cup	Serginho, Rôni, Zé Roberto	110,000	
685	4 September 1999	Estadio Monumental, Buenos Aires (A)	Argentina	0–2	Zero Hora 35th Anniversary Cup		50,000	
686	7 September 1999	Estádio Beira-Rio, Porto Alegre (H)	Argentina	4–2	Zero Hora 35th Anniversary Cup	Rivaldo (3), Ronaldo	49,500	
687	9 October 1999	Amsterdam ArenA, Amsterdam (A)	Netherlands	2–2	Friendly	Roberto Carlos, Cafu	51,000	
688	13 November 1999	Estádio Municipal de Balaídos, Vigo (A)	Spain	0–0	Friendly		31,000	
689	23 February 2000	Rajamangala Stadium, Bangkok (A)	Thailand	7–0	2000 King's Cup	Rivaldo (2), Ronaldinho, Emerson (2), Roque Júnior, Jardel	22,000	
690	28 March 2000	Estadio El Campín, Bogotá (A)	Colombia	0–0	2002 FIFA World Cup qualification		42,000	
691	26 April 2000	Estádio do Morumbi, São Paulo (H)	Ecuador	3–2	2002 FIFA World Cup qualification	Rivaldo (2), Antônio Carlos	64,738	
692	23 May 2000	Millennium Stadium, Cardiff (A)	Wales	3–0	Friendly	Élber, Cafu, Rivaldo	72,233	
693	27 May 2000	Wembley Stadium (1923), London (A)	England	1–1	Friendly	França	73,956	
694	4 June 2000	Estadio Nacional, Lima (A)	Peru	1–0	2002 FIFA World Cup qualification	Antônio Carlos	45,000	
695	28 June 2000	Maracanã Stadium, Rio de Janeiro (H)	Uruguay	1–1	2002 FIFA World Cup qualification	Rivaldo	50,000	
696	18 July 2000	Estadio Defensores del Chaco, Asunción (A)	Paraguay	1–2	2002 FIFA World Cup qualification	Rivaldo	40,000	
697	26 July 2000	Estádio do Morumbi, São Paulo (H)	Argentina	3–1	2002 FIFA World Cup qualification	Alex, Vampeta (2)	80,000	
698	15 August 2000	Estadio Nacional, Santiago (A)	Chile	0–3	2002 FIFA World Cup qualification		64,671	
699	3 September 2000	Maracanã Stadium, Rio de Janeiro (H)	Bolivia	5–0	2002 FIFA World Cup qualification	Romário (3), Rivaldo, Sandy (o.g.)	55,000	
700	8 October 2000	Estadio José Pachencho Romero, Maracaibo (A)	Venezuela	6–0	2002 FIFA World Cup qualification	Euller, Juninho Paulista, Romário (4)	6,350	
701	15 November 2000	Estádio do Morumbi, São Paulo (H)	Colombia	1–0	2002 FIFA World Cup qualification	Roque Júnior	56,213	
702	3 March 2001	Rose Bowl, Pasadena (A)	United States	2–1	Friendly	Ronaldinho, Euller	45,387	
703	7 March 2001	Estadio Jalisco, Guadalajara (A)	Mexico	3–3	Friendly	Edílson, Romário (2)	75,000	
704	28 March 2001	Estadio Olímpico Atahualpa, Quito (A)	Ecuador	0–1	2002 FIFA World Cup qualification		40,800	
705	25 April 2001	Estádio do Morumbi, São Paulo (H)	Peru	1–1	2002 FIFA World Cup qualification	Romário	55,000	
706	31 May 2001	Kashima Soccer Stadium, Kashima (N)	Cameroon	2–0	2001 FIFA Confederations Cup	Washington, Carlos Miguel	10,519	
707	2 June 2001	Kashima Soccer Stadium, Kashima (N)	Canada	0–0	2001 FIFA Confederations Cup		12,095	
708	4 June 2001	Kashima Soccer Stadium, Kashima (N)	Japan	0–0	2001 FIFA Confederations Cup		37,470	
709	7 June 2001	Suwon World Cup Stadium, Suwon (N)	France	1–2	2001 FIFA Confederations Cup	Ramon	34,527	
710	9 June 2001	Ulsan Munsu Football Stadium, Ulsan (N)	Australia	0–1	2001 FIFA Confederations Cup		28,520	
711	1 July 2001	Estadio Centenario, Montevideo (A)	Uruguay	0–1	2002 FIFA World Cup qualification		61,249	
712	12 July 2001	Estadio Olímpico Pascual Guerrero, Santiago de Cali (N)	Mexico	0–1	2001 Copa América		38,000	
713	15 July 2001	Estadio Olímpico Pascual Guerrero, Santiago de Cali (N)	Peru	2–0	2001 Copa América	Guilherme, Denílson	30,000	
714	18 July 2001	Estadio Olímpico Pascual Guerrero, Santiago de Cali (N)	Paraguay	3–1	2001 Copa América	Alex, Belletti, Denílson	40,000	
715	21 July 2001	Estadio Palogrande, Manizales (N)	Honduras	0–2	2001 Copa América		30,000	
716	9 August 2001	Arena da Baixada, Curitiba (H)	Panama	5–0	Friendly	Edílson, Alex, Euller, Juninho Paulista, Roberto Carlos	—	
717	15 August 2001	Estádio Olímpico Monumental, Porto Alegre (H)	Paraguay	2–0	2002 FIFA World Cup qualification	Marcelinho, Rivaldo	48,000	
718	5 September 2001	Estadio Monumental, Buenos Aires (A)	Argentina	1–2	2002 FIFA World Cup qualification	Ayala (o.g.)	51,000	
719	7 October 2001	Estádio Couto Pereira, Curitiba (H)	Chile	2–0	2002 FIFA World Cup qualification	Edílson, Rivaldo	52,000	
720	7 November 2001	Estadio Hernando Siles, La Paz (A)	Bolivia	1–3	2002 FIFA World Cup qualification	Edílson	32,574	
721	14 November 2001	Castelão, São Luís (H)	Venezuela	3–0	2002 FIFA World Cup qualification	Luizão (2), Rivaldo	65,000	
722	31 January 2002	Estádio Serra Dourada, Goiânia (H)	Bolivia	6–0	Friendly	Cris, Gilberto Silva (2), Kléberson, Washington, Ânderson Polga	31,800	
723	6 February 2002	King Fahd International Stadium, Riyadh (A)	Saudi Arabia	1–0	Friendly	Djalminha	55,000	
724	7 March 2002	Verdão, Cuiabá (H)	Iceland	6–1	Friendly	Ânderson Polga (2), Kléberson, Kaká, Gilberto Silva, Edílson	35,000	
725	27 March 2002	Castelão, Fortaleza (H)	FR Yugoslavia	1–0	Friendly	Luizão	57,000	
726	17 April 2002	Estádio José Alvalade, Lisbon (A)	Portugal	1–1	Friendly	Ronaldinho	46,000	
727	25 May 2002	Bukit Jalil National Stadium, Kuala Lumpur (A)	Malaysia	4–0	Friendly	Ronaldo, Juninho Paulista, Denílson, Edílson	—	
728	3 June 2002	Ulsan Munsu Football Stadium, Ulsan (N)	Turkey	2–1	2002 FIFA World Cup	Ronaldo, Rivaldo	33,842	
729	8 June 2002	Jeju World Cup Stadium, Seogwipo (N)	China	4–0	2002 FIFA World Cup	Roberto Carlos, Rivaldo, Ronaldinho, Ronaldo	36,750	
730	13 June 2002	Suwon World Cup Stadium, Suwon (N)	Costa Rica	5–2	2002 FIFA World Cup	Ronaldo (2), Edmílson, Rivaldo, Júnior	38,524	
731	17 June 2002	Kobe Wing Stadium, Kobe (N)	Belgium	2–0	2002 FIFA World Cup	Rivaldo, Ronaldo	40,440	
732	21 June 2002	Shizuoka Stadium, Fukuroi (N)	England	2–1	2002 FIFA World Cup	Rivaldo, Ronaldinho	47,463	
733	26 June 2002	Saitama Stadium, Saitama (N)	Turkey	1–0	2002 FIFA World Cup	Ronaldo	61,058	
734	30 June 2002	International Stadium, Yokohama (N)	Germany	2–0	2002 FIFA World Cup	Ronaldo (2)	69,029	
735	21 August 2002	Castelão, Fortaleza (H)	Paraguay	0–1	Friendly		30,000	
736	20 November 2002	Seoul World Cup Stadium, Seoul (A)	South Korea	3–2	Friendly	Ronaldo (2), Ronaldinho	63,000	
737	12 February 2003	Guangdong Olympic Stadium, Guangzhou (A)	China	0–0	Friendly		80,000	
738	29 March 2003	Estádio das Antas, Porto (A)	Portugal	1–2	Friendly	Ronaldinho	40,000	
739	30 April 2003	Estadio Jalisco, Guadalajara (A)	Mexico	0–0	Friendly		60,000	
740	11 June 2003	National Stadium, Abuja (A)	Nigeria	3–0	Friendly	Gil, Luís Fabiano, Adriano	30,000	
741	19 June 2003	Stade de France, Saint-Denis (N)	Cameroon	0–1	2003 FIFA Confederations Cup		46,719	
742	21 June 2003	Stade de Gerland, Lyon (N)	United States	1–0	2003 FIFA Confederations Cup	Adriano	20,306	
743	23 June 2003	Stade Geoffroy-Guichard, Saint-Étienne (N)	Turkey	2–2	2003 FIFA Confederations Cup	Adriano, Alex	29,170	
744	13 July 2003	Estadio Azteca, Mexico City (N)	Mexico	0–1	2003 CONCACAF Gold Cup		60,000	
745	15 July 2003	Estadio Azteca, Mexico City (N)	Honduras	2–1	2003 CONCACAF Gold Cup	Maicon, Diego	3,000	
746	19 July 2003	Miami Orange Bowl, Miami (N)	Colombia	2–0	2003 CONCACAF Gold Cup	Kaká (2)	23,425	
747	23 July 2003	Miami Orange Bowl, Miami (N)	United States	2–1 (a.s.d.e.t.)	2003 CONCACAF Gold Cup	Kaká, Diego	35,211	
748	27 July 2003	Estadio Azteca, Mexico City (N)	Mexico	0–1 (a.s.d.e.t.)	2003 CONCACAF Gold Cup		80,000	
749	7 September 2003	Estadio Metropolitano, Barranquilla (A)	Colombia	2–1	2006 FIFA World Cup qualification	Ronaldo, Kaká	47,600	
750	10 September 2003	Vivaldão, Manaus (H)	Ecuador	1–0	2006 FIFA World Cup qualification	Ronaldinho	36,601	
751	12 October 2003	Walkers Stadium, Leicester (N)	Jamaica	1–0	Friendly	Roberto Carlos	32,000	
752	16 November 2003	Estadio Monumental, Lima (A)	Peru	1–1	2006 FIFA World Cup qualification	Rivaldo	70,000	
753	19 November 2003	Pinheirão, Curitiba (H)	Uruguay	3–3	2006 FIFA World Cup qualification	Kaká, Ronaldo (2)	28,000	
754	18 February 2004	Lansdowne Road, Dublin (A)	Republic of Ireland	0–0	Friendly		44,000	
755	31 March 2004	Estadio Defensores del Chaco, Asunción (A)	Paraguay	0–0	2006 FIFA World Cup qualification		40,000	
756	28 April 2004	Ferenc Puskás Stadium, Budapest (A)	Hungary	4–1	Friendly	Kaká, Luís Fabiano (2), Ronaldinho	45,000	
757	20 May 2004	Stade de France, Saint-Denis (A)	France	0–0	Friendly		79,344	
758	2 June 2004	Mineirão, Belo Horizonte (H)	Argentina	3–1	2006 FIFA World Cup qualification	Ronaldo (3)	60,000	
759	6 June 2004	Estadio Nacional, Santiago (A)	Chile	1–1	2006 FIFA World Cup qualification	Luís Fabiano	62,503	
760	8 July 2004	Estadio Monumental, Arequipa (N)	Chile	1–0	2004 Copa América	Luís Fabiano	35,000	
761	11 July 2004	Estadio Monumental, Arequipa (N)	Costa Rica	4–1	2004 Copa América	Adriano (3), Juan	12,000	
762	14 July 2004	Estadio Monumental, Arequipa (N)	Paraguay	1–2	2004 Copa América	Luís Fabiano	8,000	
763	18 July 2004	Estadio Miguel Grau, Piura (N)	Mexico	4–0	2004 Copa América	Alex, Adriano (2), Oliveria	22,000	
764	21 July 2004	Estadio Nacional, Lima (A)	Uruguay	1–1 (5–3p)	2004 Copa América	Adriano	10,000	
765	25 July 2004	Estadio Nacional, Lima (A)	Argentina	2–2 (4–2p)	2004 Copa América	Luisão, Adriano	43,000	
766	18 August 2004	Stade Sylvio Cator, Port-au-Prince (A)	Haiti	6–0	Friendly	Roger (2), Ronaldinho (3), Nilmar	15,000	
767	5 September 2004	Estádio do Morumbi, São Paulo (H)	Bolivia	3–1	2006 FIFA World Cup qualification	Ronaldo, Ronaldinho, Adriano	60,000	
768	8 September 2004	Olympiastadion, Berlin (A)	Germany	1–1	Friendly	Ronaldinho	74,315	
769	9 October 2004	Estadio José Pachencho Romero, Maracaibo (A)	Venezuela	5–2	2006 FIFA World Cup qualification	Kaká (2), Ronaldo (2), Adriano	26,133	
770	13 October 2004	Estádio Rei Pelé, Maceió (H)	Colombia	0–0	2006 FIFA World Cup qualification		20,000	
771	17 November 2004	Estadio Olímpico Atahualpa, Quito (A)	Ecuador	0–1	2006 FIFA World Cup qualification		38,308	
772	9 February 2005	Hong Kong Stadium, Hong Kong (A)	Hong Kong	7–1	Carlsberg Cup	Lúcio, Roberto Carlos, Oliveira (2), Ronaldinho, Robinho, Alex	—	
773	27 March 2005	Estádio Serra Dourada, Goiânia (H)	Peru	1–0	2006 FIFA World Cup qualification	Kaká	49,163	
774	30 March 2005	Estadio Centenario, Montevideo (A)	Uruguay	1–1	2006 FIFA World Cup qualification	Emerson	60,000	
775	27 April 2005	Pacaembu Stadium, São Paulo (H)	Guatemala	3–0	Friendly	Anderson, Romário, Grafite	36,235	
776	5 June 2005	Estádio Beira-Rio, Porto Alegre (H)	Paraguay	4–1	2006 FIFA World Cup qualification	Ronaldinho (2), Zé Roberto, Robinho	45,000	
777	8 June 2005	Estadio Monumental, Buenos Aires (A)	Argentina	1–3	2006 FIFA World Cup qualification	Roberto Carlos	49,497	
778	16 June 2005	Zentralstadion, Leipzig (N)	Greece	3–0	2005 FIFA Confederations Cup	Adriano, Robinho, Juninho Pernambucano	42,507	
779	19 June 2005	Niedersachsenstadion, Hanover (N)	Mexico	0–1	2005 FIFA Confederations Cup		43,677	
780	22 June 2005	Müngersdorfer Stadion, Cologne (N)	Japan	2–2	2005 FIFA Confederations Cup	Robinho, Ronaldinho	44,922	
781	25 June 2005	Frankenstadion, Nuremberg (N)	Germany	3–2	2005 FIFA Confederations Cup	Adriano (2), Ronaldinho	42,187	
782	29 June 2005	Waldstadion, Frankfurt (N)	Argentina	4–1	2005 FIFA Confederations Cup	Adriano (2), Kaká, Ronaldinho	45,591	
783	17 August 2005	Stadion Poljud, Split	Croatia	1–1	Friendly	Ricardinho	30,000	
784	4 September 2005	Estádio Nacional Mané Garrincha, Brasília (H)	Chile	5–0	2006 FIFA World Cup qualification	Juan, Robinho, Adriano (3)	39,000	
785	9 October 2005	Estadio Hernando Siles, La Paz (A)	Bolivia	1–1	2006 FIFA World Cup qualification	Juninho Pernambucano	22,725	
786	12 October 2005	Mangueirão, Belém (H)	Venezuela	3–0	2006 FIFA World Cup qualification	Adriano, Ronaldo, Roberto Carlos	47,000	
787	12 November 2005	Zayed Sports City Stadium, Abu Dhabi (A)	United Arab Emirates	8–0	Friendly	Kaká, Adriano, Fred (2), Lúcio, Juninho Pernambucano (2), Cicinho	—	
788	1 March 2006	Lokomotiv Stadium, Moscow (A)	Russia	1–0	Friendly	Ronaldo	19,000	
789	4 June 2006	Stade de Genève, Geneva (N)	New Zealand	4–0	Friendly	Ronaldo, Adriano, Kaká, Juninho Pernambucano	32,000	
790	13 June 2006	Olympiastadion, Berlin (N)	Croatia	1–0	2006 FIFA World Cup	Kaká	66,000	
791	18 June 2006	Allianz Arena, Munich (N)	Australia	2–0	2006 FIFA World Cup	Adriano, Fred	66,000	
792	22 June 2006	Westfalenstadion, Dortmund (N)	Japan	4–1	2006 FIFA World Cup	Ronaldo (2), Juninho Pernambucano, Gilberto	65,000	
793	27 June 2006	Westfalenstadion, Dortmund (N)	Ghana	3–0	2006 FIFA World Cup	Ronaldo, Adriano, Zé Roberto	65,000	
794	1 July 2006	Waldstadion, Frankfurt (N)	France	0–1	2006 FIFA World Cup		48,000	
795	16 August 2006	Ullevaal Stadion, Oslo (A)	Norway	1–1	Friendly	Daniel Carvalho	25,062	
796	3 September 2006	Emirates Stadium, London (N)	Argentina	3–0	Friendly	Elano (2), Kaká	59,032	
797	5 September 2006	White Hart Lane, London (N)	Wales	2–0	Friendly	Marcelo, Vágner Love	22,000	
798	10 October 2006	Råsunda Stadium, Solna (N)	Ecuador	2–1	Friendly	Fred, Kaká	37,000	
799	15 November 2006	St. Jakob-Park, Basel (A)	Switzerland	2–1	Friendly	Luisão, Kaká	39,000	
800	6 February 2007	Emirates Stadium, London (N)	Portugal	0–2	Friendly		60,000	
801	24 March 2007	Ullevi, Gothenburg (N)	Chile	4–0	Friendly	Ronaldinho (2), Kaká, Juan	30,000	
802	27 March 2007	Råsunda Stadium, Solna (N)	Ghana	1–0	Friendly	Vágner Love	—	
803	1 June 2007	Wembley Stadium (2007), London (A)	England	1–1	Friendly	Diego	88,745	
804	5 June 2007	Westfalenstadion, Dortmund (N)	Turkey	0–0	Friendly		26,700	
805	27 June 2007	Polideportivo Cachamay, Ciudad Guayana (N)	Mexico	0–2	2007 Copa América		40,000	
806	1 July 2007	Estadio Monumental de Maturín, Maturín (N)	Chile	3–0	2007 Copa América	Robinho (3)	42,000	
807	4 July 2007	Estadio José Antonio Anzoátegui, Barcelona (N)	Ecuador	1–0	2007 Copa América	Robinho	34,000	
808	7 July 2007	Estadio José Antonio Anzoátegui, Barcelona (N)	Chile	6–1	2007 Copa América	Juan, Baptista, Robinho (2), Josué, Vágner Love	25,000	
809	10 July 2007	Estadio José Pachencho Romero, Maracaibo (N)	Uruguay	2–2 (5–4p)	2007 Copa América	Maicon, Baptista	40,000	
810	15 July 2007	Estadio José Pachencho Romero, Maracaibo (N)	Argentina	3–0	2007 Copa América	Baptista, Ayala (o.g.), Dani Alves	42,000	
811	22 August 2007	Stade de la Mosson, Montpellier (N)	Algeria	2–0	Friendly	Maicon, Ronaldinho	26,392	
812	9 September 2007	Soldier Field, Chicago (A)	United States	4–2	Friendly	Onyewu (o.g.), Lúcio, Ronaldinho, Elano	43,543	
813	12 September 2007	Gillette Stadium, Foxborough (N)	Mexico	3–1	Friendly	Kléber, Kaká, Afonso Alves	67,584	
814	14 October 2007	Estadio El Campín, Bogotá (A)	Colombia	0–0	2010 FIFA World Cup qualification		41,000	
815	17 October 2007	Maracanã Stadium, Rio de Janeiro (H)	Ecuador	5–0	2010 FIFA World Cup qualification	Vágner Love, Ronaldinho, Kaká (2), Elano	87,000	
816	18 November 2007	Estadio Monumental, Lima (A)	Peru	1–1	2010 FIFA World Cup qualification	Kaká	45,847	
817	21 November 2007	Estádio do Morumbi, São Paulo (H)	Uruguay	2–1	2010 FIFA World Cup qualification	Luís Fabiano (2)	70,000	
818	6 February 2008	Croke Park, Dublin (A)	Republic of Ireland	1–0	Friendly	Robinho	30,000	
819	26 March 2008	Emirates Stadium, London (N)	Sweden	1–0	Friendly	Pato	60,021	
820	31 May 2008	Qwest Field, Seattle (N)	Canada	3–2	Friendly	Diego, Luís Fabiano, Robinho	47,052	
821	6 June 2008	Gillette Stadium, Foxborough (N)	Venezuela	0–2	Friendly		68,000	
822	15 June 2008	Estadio Defensores del Chaco, Asunción (A)	Paraguay	0–2	2010 FIFA World Cup qualification		38,000	
823	18 June 2008	Mineirão, Belo Horizonte (H)	Argentina	0–0	2010 FIFA World Cup qualification		65,000	
824	7 September 2008	Estadio Nacional, Santiago (A)	Chile	3–0	2010 FIFA World Cup qualification	Luís Fabiano (2), Robinho	60,239	
825	10 September 2008	Estádio Olímpico João Havelange, Rio de Janeiro (H)	Bolivia	0–0	2010 FIFA World Cup qualification		31,422	
826	12 October 2008	Estadio Polideportivo de Pueblo Nuevo, San Cristóbal (A)	Venezuela	4–0	2010 FIFA World Cup qualification	Kaká, Robinho (2), Adriano	38,000	
827	15 October 2008	Maracanã Stadium, Rio de Janeiro (H)	Colombia	0–0	2010 FIFA World Cup qualification		54,910	
828	19 November 2008	Bezerrão, Gama (H)	Portugal	6–2	Friendly	Luís Fabiano (3), Maicon, Elano, Adriano	19,157	
829	10 February 2009	Emirates Stadium, London (N)	Italy	2–0	Friendly	Elano, Robinho	60,077	
830	29 March 2009	Estadio Olímpico Atahualpa, Quito (A)	Ecuador	1–1	2010 FIFA World Cup qualification	Baptista	40,000	
831	1 April 2009	Estádio Beira-Rio, Porto Alegre (H)	Peru	3–0	2010 FIFA World Cup qualification	Luís Fabiano (2), Felipe Melo	55,000	
832	6 June 2009	Estadio Centenario, Montevideo (A)	Uruguay	4–0	2010 FIFA World Cup qualification	Dani Alves, Juan, Luís Fabiano, Kaká	52,000	
833	10 June 2009	Estádio do Arruda, Recife (H)	Paraguay	2–1	2010 FIFA World Cup qualification	Robinho, Nilmar	56,682	
834	15 June 2009	Free State Stadium, Bloemfontein (N)	Egypt	4–3	2009 FIFA Confederations Cup	Kaká (2), Luís Fabiano, Juan	27,851	
835	18 June 2009	Loftus Versfeld Stadium, Pretoria (N)	United States	3–0	2009 FIFA Confederations Cup	Felipe Melo, Robinho, Maicon	39,617	
836	21 June 2009	Loftus Versfeld Stadium, Pretoria (N)	Italy	3–0	2009 FIFA Confederations Cup	Luís Fabiano (2), Dossena (o.g.)	41,195	
837	25 June 2009	Ellis Park Stadium, Johannesburg (N)	South Africa	1–0	2009 FIFA Confederations Cup	Dani Alves	48,049	
838	28 June 2009	Ellis Park Stadium, Johannesburg (N)	United States	3–2	2009 FIFA Confederations Cup	Luís Fabiano (2), Lúcio	52,291	
839	12 August 2009	Lilleküla Stadium, Tallinn (A)	Estonia	1–0	Friendly	Luís Fabiano	8,550	
840	5 September 2009	Estadio Gigante de Arroyito, Rosario (A)	Argentina	3–1	2010 FIFA World Cup qualification	Luisão, Luís Fabiano (2)	37,000	
841	9 September 2009	Estádio de Pituaçu, Salvador (H)	Chile	4–2	2010 FIFA World Cup qualification	Nilmar (3), Baptista	30,000	
842	11 October 2009	Estadio Hernando Siles, La Paz (A)	Bolivia	1–2	2010 FIFA World Cup qualification	Nilmar	16,557	
843	14 October 2009	Estádio Pedro Pedrossian, Campo Grande (H)	Venezuela	0–0	2010 FIFA World Cup qualification		23,746	
844	14 November 2009	Khalifa International Stadium, Doha (N)	England	1–0	Friendly	Nilmar	50,000	
845	17 November 2009	Sultan Qaboos Sports Complex, Muscat (A)	Oman	2–0	Friendly	Nilmar, Mudhafar (o.g.)	—	

== Record by opponent ==
Team	Pld	W	D	L	GF	GA	GD	WPCT
Algeria	1	1	0	0	2	0	+2	100.00
Andorra	1	1	0	0	3	0	+3	100.00
Argentina	23	10	7	6	42	29	+13	43.48
Australia	4	2	1	1	8	1	+7	50.00
Belgium	1	1	0	0	2	0	+2	100.00
Bolivia	11	6	2	3	28	11	+17	54.55
Bosnia and Herzegovina	1	1	0	0	1	0	+1	100.00
Bulgaria	2	2	0	0	5	1	+4	100.00
Cameroon	4	3	0	1	7	1	+6	75.00
Canada	4	2	2	0	8	4	+4	50.00
Chile	17	12	3	2	42	11	+31	70.59
China	2	1	1	0	4	0	+4	50.00
Colombia	12	7	4	1	15	4	+11	58.33
Costa Rica	5	5	0	0	19	5	+14	100.00
Croatia	2	1	1	0	2	1	+1	50.00
Czech Republic	1	1	0	0	2	0	+2	100.00
Czechoslovakia	1	1	0	0	2	1	+1	100.00
Denmark	1	1	0	0	3	2	+1	100.00
East Germany	1	0	1	0	3	3	0	0.00
Ecuador	14	10	2	2	28	10	+18	71.43
Egypt	1	1	0	0	4	3	+1	100.00
El Salvador	2	2	0	0	8	0	+8	100.00
England	9	4	4	1	11	7	+4	44.44
Estonia	1	1	0	0	1	0	+1	100.00
FR Yugoslavia	3	2	1	0	4	1	+3	66.67
Finland	1	1	0	0	3	1	+2	100.00
France	6	1	2	3	4	7	−3	16.67
Germany	8	5	2	1	19	10	+9	62.50
Ghana	3	3	0	0	12	2	+10	100.00
Greece	1	1	0	0	3	0	+3	100.00
Guatemala	2	1	1	0	4	1	+3	50.00
Haiti	1	1	0	0	6	0	+6	100.00
Honduras	5	3	1	1	16	6	+10	60.00
Hong Kong	1	1	0	0	7	1	+6	100.00
Hungary	1	1	0	0	4	1	+3	100.00
Iceland	2	2	0	0	9	1	+8	100.00
Israel	1	1	0	0	2	1	+1	100.00
Italy	4	2	2	0	8	3	+5	50.00
Jamaica	3	2	1	0	2	0	+2	66.67
Japan	7	5	2	0	19	4	+15	71.43
Latvia	1	1	0	0	3	0	+3	100.00
Lithuania	1	1	0	0	3	1	+2	100.00
Malaysia	1	1	0	0	4	0	+4	100.00
Mexico	20	9	4	7	34	22	+12	45.00
Morocco	2	2	0	0	5	0	+5	100.00
Netherlands	6	2	4	0	13	10	+3	33.33
New Zealand	2	2	0	0	6	0	+6	100.00
Nigeria	1	1	0	0	3	0	+3	100.00
Norway	3	0	1	2	4	7	−3	0.00
Oman	1	1	0	0	2	0	+2	100.00
Panama	1	1	0	0	5	0	+5	100.00
Paraguay	13	7	2	4	21	11	+10	53.85
Peru	10	6	4	0	19	3	+16	60.00
Poland	3	2	1	0	8	5	+3	66.67
Portugal	4	1	1	2	8	7	+1	25.00
Republic of Ireland	2	1	1	0	1	0	+1	50.00
Romania	1	1	0	0	1	0	+1	100.00
Russia	4	3	1	0	10	3	+7	75.00
Saudi Arabia	3	3	0	0	12	2	+10	100.00
Scotland	2	2	0	0	3	1	+2	100.00
Slovakia	1	1	0	0	5	0	+5	100.00
South Africa	3	3	0	0	6	3	+3	100.00
South Korea	4	3	0	1	6	4	+2	75.00
Spain	2	0	1	1	0	3	−3	0.00
Sweden	5	4	1	0	6	2	+4	80.00
Switzerland	1	1	0	0	2	1	+1	100.00
Thailand	1	1	0	0	7	0	+7	100.00
Turkey	4	2	2	0	5	3	+2	50.00
United Arab Emirates	1	1	0	0	8	0	+8	100.00
United States	14	13	0	1	25	7	+18	92.86
Uruguay	16	5	8	3	25	16	+9	31.25
Venezuela	10	8	1	1	37	5	+32	80.00
Wales	4	3	0	1	8	1	+7	75.00
Yugoslavia	1	1	0	0	3	1	+2	100.00
Total	318	201	72	45	680	251	+429	63.21

Source: Results
