= 1991 in Brazilian football =

Football in Brazil
- Season: 1991

The following article presents a summary of the 1991 football (soccer) season in Brazil, which was the 90th season of competitive football in the country.

== Campeonato Brasileiro Série A ==
Semifinals

Team 1	Agg.	Team 2	1st leg	2nd leg
Atlético Mineiro	1-1	São Paulo	1-1	0-0
Fluminense	1-2	Bragantino	0-1	1-1

Final

June 5, 1991

São Paulo	1–0	Bragantino

Morumbi

June 9, 1991

Bragantino	0–0	São Paulo

Marcelo Stéfani

São Paulo declared as the Campeonato Brasileiro champions by aggregate score of 1-0.

=== Relegation ===
The two worst placed teams in the first stage, which are Grêmio and Vitória, were relegated to the following year's second level.

== Campeonato Brasileiro Série B ==
Quarterfinals

Team 1	Agg.	Team 2	1st leg	2nd leg
ABC	2-3	Paysandu	1-0	1-3
Americano	3-3	Santa Cruz	1-0	2-3
Guarani	3-3	Noroeste	1-0	2-3
Paraná	1-4	Coritiba	1-0	0-4

Semifinals

Team 1	Agg.	Team 2	1st leg	2nd leg
Americano	1-1	Paysandu	1-0	0-1 (4-5 pen)
Coritiba	1-1	Guarani	1-0	0-1 (4-5 pen)

Final

May 19, 1991

Guarani	1–0	Paysandu

Brinco de Ouro

May 26, 1991

Paysandu	2–0	Guarani

Mangueirão

Paysandu declared as the Campeonato Brasileiro Série B champions by aggregate score of 2-1.

=== Promotion ===
The champion and runner-up, which are Paysandu and Guarani, were promoted to the following year's first level.

== Copa do Brasil ==
The Copa do Brasil final was played between Criciúma and Grêmio.

May 30, 1991

Grêmio	1–1	Criciúma

Olímpico

June 6, 1991

Criciúma	0–0	Grêmio

Heriberto Hülse

Criciúma declared as the cup champions on the away goal rule by aggregate score of 1-1.

== State championship champions ==
State	Champion	State	Champion
Acre	Atlético Acreano	Paraíba	Campinense
Alagoas	CSA	Paraná	Paraná
Amapá	Macapá	Pernambuco	Sport Recife
Amazonas	Nacional	Piauí	Picos
Bahia	Bahia	Rio de Janeiro	Flamengo
Ceará	Fortaleza	Rio Grande do Norte	América-RN
Distrito Federal	Taguatinga	Rio Grande do Sul	Internacional
Espírito Santo	Muniz Freire	Rondônia	Ji-Paraná
Goiás	Goiás	Roraima	Rio Negro-RR
Maranhão	Sampaio Corrêa	Santa Catarina	Criciúma
Mato Grosso	Dom Bosco	São Paulo	São Paulo
Mato Grosso do Sul	Operário	Sergipe	Sergipe
Minas Gerais	Atlético Mineiro	Tocantins	-
Pará	Remo		

== Youth competition champions ==
Competition	Champion
Copa Santiago de Futebol Juvenil	Matsubara
Copa São Paulo de Juniores	Portuguesa
Taça Belo Horizonte de Juniores	Vasco

== Other competition champions ==
Competition	Champion
Copa Rio	Flamengo
Copa Santa Catarina	Araranguá
Supercopa do Brasil	Corinthians

== Brazilian clubs in international competitions ==
Team	Copa Libertadores 1991	Supercopa Sudamericana 1991
Corinthians	Round of 16	Did not qualify
Cruzeiro	Did not qualify	Champions
Flamengo	Quarterfinals	Quarterfinals
Grêmio	Did not qualify	Round of 16
Santos	Did not qualify	Quarterfinals

== Brazil national team ==
The following table lists all the games played by the Brazil national football team in official competitions and friendly matches during 1991.

Date	Opposition	Result	Score	Brazil scorers	Competition
February 27, 1991	Paraguay	W	1-1	Neto	International Friendly
March 27, 1991	Argentina	D	3-3	Luiz Henrique, Renato Gaúcho, Careca	International Friendly
April 17, 1991	Romania	W	1-0	Moacir	International Friendly
May 28, 1991	Bulgaria	W	3-0	Neto (2), João Paulo	International Friendly
June 27, 1991	Argentina	D	1-1	Neto	International Friendly
July 9, 1991	Bolivia	W	2-1	Neto, Branco	Copa América
July 11, 1991	Uruguay	D	1-1	João Paulo, Branco	Copa América
July 13, 1991	Colombia	L	0-2	-	Copa América
July 15, 1991	Ecuador	W	3-1	Mazinho Oliveira, Márcio Santos, Luiz Henrique	Copa América
July 17, 1991	Argentina	L	2-3	Branco, João Paulo	Copa América
July 19, 1991	Colombia	W	2-0	Renato Gaúcho, Branco	Copa América
July 21, 1991	Chile	W	2-0	Mazinho Oliveira, Luiz Henrique	Copa América
September 11, 1991	Wales	L	0-1	-	International Friendly
October 30, 1991	Yugoslavia	W	3-1	Luiz Henrique, Müller, Raí	International Friendly
December 18, 1991	Czechoslovakia	W	2-1	Elivélton, Raí	International Friendly

== Women's football ==
=== Brazil women's national football team ===
The following table lists all the games played by the Brazil women's national football team in official competitions and friendly matches during 1991.

Date	Opposition	Result	Score	Brazil scorers	Competition
April 28, 1991	Chile	W	6–1	unavailable	Sudamericano Femenino
May 5, 1991	Venezuela	W	6–0	unavailable	Sudamericano Femenino
November 17, 1991	Japan	W	1–0	Elane	World Cup
November 19, 1991	United States	L	0–5	-	World Cup
November 21, 1991	Sweden	L	0–2	-	World Cup

The Brazil women's national football team competed in the following competitions in 1991:

Competition	Performance
Sudamericano Femenino	Champions
World Cup	Group stage
