= Brazil at the 1994 FIFA World Cup =

Matches of the Brazil national football team in the 1994 FIFA World Cup

At the 1994 FIFA World Cup, Brazil participated for the 15th time in the event. The country remained as the only national team to have participated in every installment of the FIFA World Cup. Brazil reached the final where they defeated Italy on penalties.

The coach was Carlos Alberto Parreira, with Zagallo as coordinator, and Dunga as captain.

== Squad ==
Head coach: (Brazil) Carlos Alberto Parreira

No.	Pos.	Player	Date of birth (age)	Caps	Club
1	GK	Taffarel	8 May 1966 (aged 28)		(Italy) Reggiana
2	DF	Jorginho	17 August 1964 (aged 29)		(Germany) Bayern Munich
3	DF	Ricardo Rocha	11 September 1962 (aged 31)		(Brazil) Vasco da Gama
4	DF	Ronaldão	19 June 1965 (aged 28)		(Japan) Shimizu S-Pulse
5	MF	Mauro Silva	12 January 1968 (aged 26)		(Spain) Deportivo La Coruña
6	DF	Branco	4 April 1964 (aged −1269)		(Brazil) Fluminense
7	FW	Bebeto	16 February 1964 (aged 30)		(Spain) Deportivo La Coruña
8	MF	Dunga(c)	31 October 1963 (aged 30)		(Germany) VfB Stuttgart
9	MF	Zinho	17 June 1967 (aged 27)		(Brazil) Palmeiras
10	MF	Raí	15 May 1965 (aged 29)		(France) Paris Saint-Germain
11	FW	Romário	29 January 1966 (aged 28)		(Spain) Barcelona
12	GK	Zetti	10 January 1965 (aged 29)		(Brazil) São Paulo
13	DF	Aldair	30 November 1965 (aged 28)		(Italy) Roma
14	DF	Cafu	7 June 1970 (aged 24)		(Brazil) São Paulo
15	DF	Márcio Santos	15 September 1969 (aged 24)		(France) Bordeaux
16	MF	Leonardo	5 September 1969 (aged 24)		(Brazil) São Paulo
17	MF	Mazinho	8 April 1966 (aged 28)		(Brazil) Palmeiras
18	FW	Paulo Sérgio	2 June 1969 (aged 25)		(Germany) Bayer Leverkusen
19	FW	Müller	31 January 1966 (aged 28)		(Brazil) São Paulo
20	FW	Ronaldo	22 September 1976 (aged 17)		(Brazil) Cruzeiro
21	FW	Viola	1 January 1969 (aged 25)		(Brazil) Corinthians
22	GK	Gilmar	13 January 1959 (aged 35)		(Brazil) Flamengo

== Matches ==
Brazil competed in Group B of the 1994 FIFA World Cup, alongside Russia, Cameroon, and Sweden.

In their opening match on 20 June 1994 at Stanford Stadium in Stanford, Brazil defeated Russia 2–0, with goals from Romário and Raí (penalty). They followed this with a 3–0 victory over Cameroon on 24 June at the same venue, with Romário scoring twice and Márcio Santos adding a third. In their final group match on 28 June at the Pontiac Silverdome in Pontiac, Brazil drew 1–1 with Sweden, with Romário scoring Brazil’s goal. Brazil finished top of Group B.

In the Round of 16, Brazil faced the United States on 4 July at Stanford Stadium. Despite having Leonardo sent off in the first half, Brazil secured a 1–0 victory through a goal from Bebeto.

In the quarter-finals on 9 July at the Cotton Bowl in Dallas, Brazil defeated the Netherlands 3–2 in a closely contested match. Romário opened the scoring, Bebeto added a second, and Branco scored the winning goal from a free kick after the Netherlands had equalized.

Brazil met Sweden again in the semi-finals on 13 July at the Rose Bowl in Pasadena, winning 1–0 thanks to a header from Romário.

The final was held on 17 July at the Rose Bowl, where Brazil faced Italy. After a 0–0 draw following extra time, the match was decided by a penalty shoot-out. Brazil won 3–2, with successful penalties from Márcio Santos, Branco, and Dunga. Italy’s Roberto Baggio missed the decisive penalty, securing Brazil’s fourth FIFA World Cup title.

== Brazil vs Russia ==
20 June 1994
13:00 PDT

Brazil	2–0	Russia
Romário 26'; Raí 52' (pen.)	Report

Stanford Stadium, Palo Alto
Attendance: 81,061
Referee: Lim Kee Chong (Mauritius)

Brazil	Russia

GK	1	Taffarel
DF	2	Jorginho
DF	3	Ricardo Rocha	(substituted off) 75'
DF	15	Márcio Santos
DM	5	Mauro Silva
DM	8	Dunga	(substituted off) 85'
AM	16	Leonardo
AM	10	Raí(c)
RW	9	Zinho
LW	7	Bebeto
FW	11	Romário
Substitutions:
DF	13	Aldair	(substituted on) 75'
MF	17	Mazinho	(substituted on) 85'
Manager:
Carlos Alberto Parreira

GK	16	Dmitri Kharine(c)
DF	2	Dmitri Kuznetsov	(yellow card) 78'
DF	3	Sergei Gorlukovich
DF	5	Yuriy Nikiforov	(yellow card) 61'
DF	6	Vladislav Ternavsky
MF	7	Andrei Piatnitski
MF	10	Valeri Karpin
FW	15	Dmitri Radchenko		(substituted off) 77'
MF	17	Ilya Tsymbalar
DF	21	Dmitri Khlestov	(yellow card) 65'
FW	22	Sergei Yuran		(substituted off) 55'
Substitutions:
FW	9	Oleg Salenko		(substituted on) 55'
MF	13	Aleksandr Borodyuk		(substituted on) 77'
Manager:
Pavel Sadyrin

Assistant referees:
El Jilali Rharib (Morocco)
Domenico Ramicone (Italy)
Fourth official:
Fabio Baldas (Italy)

== Brazil vs Cameroon ==
24 June 1994
13:00 PDT

Brazil	3–0	Cameroon
Romário 39'; Márcio Santos 66'; Bebeto 73'	Report

Stanford Stadium, Palo Alto
Attendance: 83,401
Referee: Arturo Brizio Carter (Mexico)

Brazil	Cameroon

GK	1	Taffarel
DF	2	Jorginho
DF	13	Aldair
DF	15	Márcio Santos
DM	5	Mauro Silva	(yellow card) 44'
DM	8	Dunga
MF	10	Raí(c)		(substituted off) 81'
MF	16	Leonardo
RW	9	Zinho		(substituted off) 75'
LW	7	Bebeto
FW	11	Romário
Substitutions:
MF	18	Paulo Sérgio		(substituted on) 75'
FW	19	Müller		(substituted on) 81'
Manager:
Carlos Alberto Parreira

GK	1	Joseph-Antoine Bell
DF	3	Rigobert Song	(red card) 63'
MF	6	Thomas Libiih
FW	7	François Omam-Biyik
MF	8	Emile Mbouh
FW	10	Louis-Paul Mfédé		(substituted off) 71'
DF	13	Raymond Kalla	(yellow card) 37'
DF	14	Stephen Tataw(c)	(yellow card) 8'
DF	15	Hans Agbo
MF	17	Marc-Vivien Foé
FW	19	David Embé		(substituted off) 64'
Substitutions:
FW	9	Roger Milla		(substituted on) 64'
MF	11	Emmanuel Maboang		(substituted on) 71'
Manager:
(France) Henri Michel

Assistant referees:
Douglas James (Trinidad and Tobago)
Carl-Johan Meyer Christensen (Denmark)
Fourth official:
Peter Mikkelsen (Denmark)

== Brazil vs Sweden ==
28 June 1994
16:00 EDT

Brazil	1–1	Sweden
Romário 46'	Report	K. Andersson 23'

Pontiac Silverdome, Pontiac
Attendance: 77,217
Referee: Sándor Puhl (Hungary)

Brazil	Sweden

GK	1	Taffarel
DF	2	Jorginho
MF	5	Mauro Silva		(substituted off) 45'
FW	7	Bebeto
MF	8	Dunga
MF	9	Zinho
MF	10	Raí(c)		(substituted off) 83'
FW	11	Romário
DF	13	Aldair	(yellow card) 68'
DF	15	Márcio Santos
DF	16	Leonardo
Substitutions:
MF	17	Mazinho		(substituted on) 45'
MF	18	Paulo Sérgio		(substituted on) 83'
Manager:
Carlos Alberto Parreira

GK	1	Thomas Ravelli
DF	2	Roland Nilsson
DF	3	Patrik Andersson
DF	5	Roger Ljung
MF	6	Stefan Schwarz		(substituted off) 75'
FW	7	Henrik Larsson		(substituted off) 65'
MF	8	Klas Ingesson
MF	9	Jonas Thern(c)
FW	11	Tomas Brolin
DF	14	Pontus Kåmark
FW	19	Kennet Andersson
Substitutions:
MF	21	Jesper Blomqvist		(substituted on) 65'
MF	18	Håkan Mild	(yellow card) 83'	(substituted on) 75'
Manager:
Tommy Svensson

Assistant referees:
Sándor Márton (Hungary)
Luc Matthys (Belgium)
Fourth official:
Manuel Díaz Vega (Spain)

== Brazil vs United States ==
4 July 1994
12:35

Brazil	1 – 0	United States
Bebeto 72'	Report

Stanford Stadium, Stanford
Attendance: 84,147
Referee: Joël Quiniou (France)

Brazil	United States

GK	1	Taffarel
DF	2	Jorginho	(yellow card) 16'
MF	5	Mauro Silva
FW	7	Bebeto
MF	8	Dunga (c)
MF	9	Zinho		(substituted off) 69'
FW	11	Romário
DF	13	Aldair
DF	15	Márcio Santos
DF	16	Leonardo	(red card) 43'
MF	17	Mazinho	(yellow card) 8'
Substitutions:
DF	14	Cafu		(substituted on) 69'
Manager:
Carlos Alberto Parreira

GK	1	Tony Meola (c)
DF	5	Thomas Dooley	(yellow card) 80'
DF	17	Marcelo Balboa
DF	20	Paul Caligiuri	(yellow card) 49'
DF	21	Fernando Clavijo	(yellow card) 64' (yellow-red card) 85'
DF	22	Alexi Lalas
MF	7	Hugo Pérez		(substituted off) 66'
MF	9	Tab Ramos	(yellow card) 43'	(substituted off) 45'
MF	13	Cobi Jones
MF	16	Mike Sorber
FW	8	Earnie Stewart
Substitutions:
FW	11	Eric Wynalda		(substituted on) 45'
FW	10	Roy Wegerle		(substituted on) 66'
Manager:
(Federal Republic of Yugoslavia) Bora Milutinović

== Netherlands vs Brazil ==
9 July 1994
14:35

Netherlands	2 – 3	Brazil
Bergkamp 64'; Winter 76'	Report	Romário 53'; Bebeto 63'; Branco 81'

Cotton Bowl, Dallas
Attendance: 63,500
Referee: Rodrigo Badilla (Costa Rica)

Netherlands	Brazil

GK	1	Ed de Goey
MF	3	Frank Rijkaard		(substituted off) 65'
DF	4	Ronald Koeman (c)
MF	5	Rob Witschge
MF	6	Jan Wouters	(yellow card) 89'
MF	7	Marc Overmars
MF	8	Wim Jonk
FW	10	Dennis Bergkamp
DF	18	Stan Valckx
FW	19	Peter van Vossen		(substituted off) 54'
MF	20	Aron Winter	(yellow card) 40'
Substitutions:
FW	11	Bryan Roy		(substituted on) 54'
MF	9	Ronald De Boer		(substituted on) 65'
Manager:
Dick Advocaat

GK	1	Taffarel
DF	2	Jorginho
MF	5	Mauro Silva
DF	6	Branco		(substituted off) 90'
FW	7	Bebeto
MF	8	Dunga (c)	(yellow card) 74'
MF	9	Zinho
FW	11	Romário
DF	13	Aldair
DF	15	Márcio Santos
MF	17	Mazinho		(substituted off) 81'
Substitutions:
MF	10	Raí		(substituted on) 81'
DF	14	Cafu		(substituted on) 90'
Manager:
Carlos Alberto Parreira

== Sweden vs Brazil ==
13 July 1994
16:05

Sweden	0 – 1	Brazil
	Report	Romário 80'

Rose Bowl, Pasadena
Attendance: 91,856
Referee: José Torres Cadena (Colombia)

Sweden	Brazil

GK	1	Thomas Ravelli
DF	2	Roland Nilsson
DF	3	Patrik Andersson
DF	4	Joachim Björklund
DF	5	Roger Ljung	(yellow card) 29'
MF	8	Klas Ingesson
MF	9	Jonas Thern (c)	(red card) 63'
FW	10	Martin Dahlin		(substituted off) 68'
FW	11	Tomas Brolin	(yellow card) 86'
MF	18	Håkan Mild
FW	19	Kennet Andersson
Substitutions:
MF	17	Stefan Rehn		(substituted on) 68'
Manager:
Tommy Svensson

GK	1	Taffarel
DF	2	Jorginho
MF	5	Mauro Silva
DF	6	Branco
FW	7	Bebeto
MF	8	Dunga (c)
MF	9	Zinho	(yellow card) 3'
FW	11	Romário
DF	13	Aldair
DF	15	Márcio Santos
MF	17	Mazinho		(substituted off) 45'
Substitutions:
MF	10	Raí		(substituted on) 45'
Manager:
Carlos Alberto Parreira

== Final ==
17 July 1994
12:35 PDT

Brazil	0 – 0 (a.e.t.)	Italy
	(Report)
Penalties
Márcio Santos (penalty missed); Romário (penalty scored); Branco (penalty scored); Dunga (penalty scored)	3 – 2	(penalty missed) Baresi; (penalty scored) Albertini; (penalty scored) Evani; (penalty missed) Massaro; (penalty missed) R. Baggio

Rose Bowl, Pasadena
Attendance: 94,194
Referee: Sándor Puhl (Hungary)

Brazil	Italy

GK	1	Claudio Taffarel
RB	2	Jorginho		(substituted off) 21'
CB	13	Aldair
CB	15	Marcio Santos
LB	6	Branco
CM	5	Mauro Silva
CM	8	Dunga (c)
AM	17	Mazinho	(yellow card) 4'
AM	9	Zinho		(substituted off) 106'
CF	11	Romário
CF	7	Bebeto
Substitutions:
DF	14	Cafu	(yellow card) 87'	(substituted on) 21'
FW	21	Viola		(substituted on) 106'
Manager:
Carlos Alberto Parreira

GK	1	Gianluca Pagliuca
RB	8	Roberto Mussi		(substituted off) 35'
CB	6	Franco Baresi (c)
CB	5	Paolo Maldini
LB	3	Antonio Benarrivo
RM	14	Nicola Berti
CM	13	Dino Baggio		(substituted off) 95'
CM	11	Demetrio Albertini	(yellow card) 42'
LM	16	Roberto Donadoni
CF	10	Roberto Baggio
CF	19	Daniele Massaro
Substitutes:
DF	2	Luigi Apolloni	(yellow card) 41'	(substituted on) 35'
MF	17	Alberigo Evani		(substituted on) 95'
Manager:
Arrigo Sacchi
