= 1994 FIFA World Cup final =

World Cup final, held in the United States

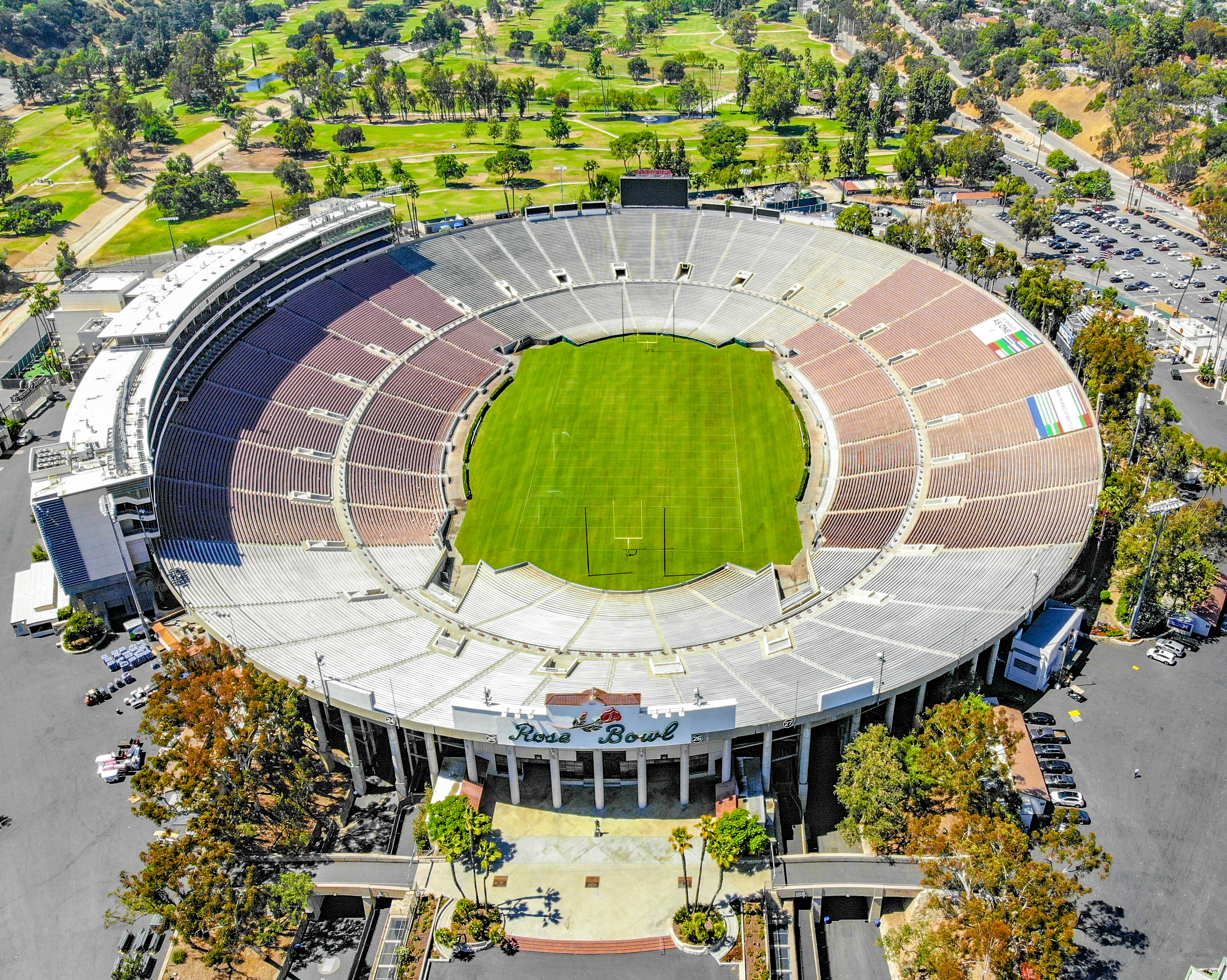
- Rose Bowl stadium, the final venue, photographed in 2018.
- Event: 1994 FIFA World Cup
Brazil	Italy
0	0
- After extra time Brazil won 3–2 on penalties
- Date: July 17, 1994
- Venue: Rose Bowl, Pasadena, California
- Referee: Sándor Puhl (Hungary)
- Attendance: 94,194
- Weather: Scattered clouds 100 °F (38 °C)

The final match of the 1994 FIFA World Cup, the 15th edition of the quadrennial soccer competition organized by FIFA for the men's national teams of its member associations, took place at the Rose Bowl in Pasadena, California, United States, on July 17, 1994. Brazil beat Italy 3–2 on penalties to claim its fourth World Cup title when the game finished 0–0 after extra time. This was the first time Brazil lifted the FIFA World Cup Trophy; for their previous three titles, last won in 1970, they were awarded the Jules Rimet Trophy. This is also the first FIFA World Cup final held in the United States, with the second being the 2026 final.

It is to date the only World Cup final to be scoreless after 120 minutes, and the first to be decided by a penalty shoot-out. Silver Ball winner Roberto Baggio missed the decisive penalty for Italy. Brazil had previously beaten Italy in the 1970 final, marking the 1994 final as the second time that the same teams had met in two different World Cup finals, after Argentina and West Germany met in 1986 and 1990. Played at 12:30 pm local time, this was the last World Cup final to be played in broad daylight until the 2026 final.

FIFA awarded the final game of the tournament to the famous college sports stadium near Los Angeles on June 30, 1992; the Rose Bowl was the largest stadium used for the tournament. With over 94,000 spectators, the 1994 final is the most recent World Cup final to have an attendance of 90,000 or more as of 2026.

The Brazilian team dedicated its win to the late triple Formula One motor racing world champion Ayrton Senna, who had died in an accident at that year's San Marino Grand Prix in Italy two and a half months before. With Italy finishing as runner-up, Franco Baresi became the sixth player in history to win gold, silver, and bronze medals at the FIFA World Cup. Previously this result was attained in 1974 by five German players: Sepp Maier, Franz Beckenbauer, Wolfgang Overath, Jürgen Grabowski, and Horst-Dieter Höttges.

== Background ==
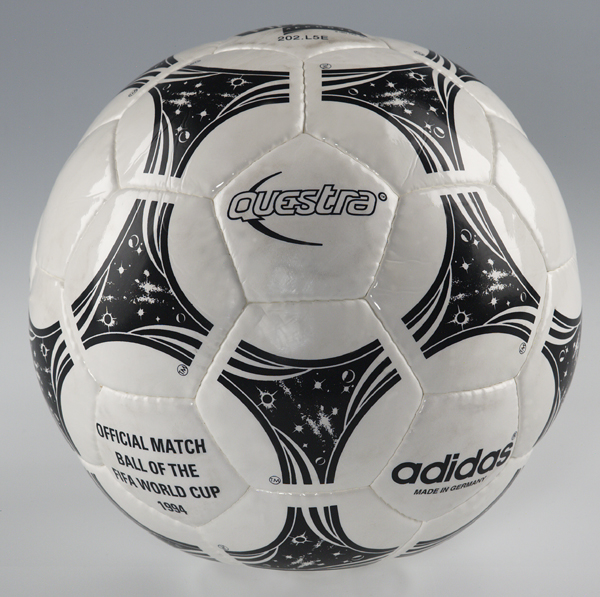
An example of the Adidas Questra ball used in the game

The 1994 FIFA World Cup was the 15th edition of the World Cup, FIFA's competition for national teams, held in the United States between June 17 and July 17, 1994. The finals featured 24 teams, with the United States qualifying for the finals automatically as tournament host, along with Germany as the 1990 winner. The remaining 22 spots were decided through qualifying rounds held between March 1992 and November 1993, organized by the six FIFA confederations and involving 147 teams. In the final tournament, the twenty-four teams were divided into six groups of four with each team playing each other once within the group in a round-robin format. The two top teams from each group, along with the four best third-placed sides, advanced to a knockout phase.

The game was played at the Rose Bowl, in the city of Pasadena, California, part of the Los Angeles metropolitan area. With a capacity of 102,000, it was the largest of the venues selected for the World Cup and had previously hosted the gold medal match at the 1984 Summer Olympics and five Super Bowls, as well as the annual Rose Bowl Game in college American football. The ball for this game was the Adidas Questra, which was introduced at the start of the World Cup. The ball was lighter than those previously used. Canadian journalist Scott McKeen described it as having been "engineered to created more excitement for soccer, in a land where there has been little soccer excitement". The ball's controllability was praised by strikers in the tournament, but goalkeepers criticized what they said was its unpredictable tendency to deviate in flight.

Brazil had won the title three times before—in 1958, 1962, and 1970—while Italy had also recorded three wins in the 1934, 1938, and 1982 tournaments. The winner would therefore be the first nation to record a fourth World Cup win. The two teams had met four times previously in the World Cup with two wins each – in the semifinal of the 1938 tournament, which Italy won 2–1; the 1970 final, which Brazil won 4–1; the match for third place in 1978, won 2–1 by Brazil; and four years later in the group stage, where Italy won the game 3–2.

Brazil began the tournament as the favorite, with both pundits and bookmakers regarding it as the most likely team to win. Commentators cited the team's star players such as Raí and Romario, as well as the hot weather conditions, which they said would favor Latin American teams. Italy was also listed before the tournament among the teams likely to win the competition, although some commentators thought it might face difficulties based on poor recent performance and a failure to adapt to manager Arrigo Sacchi's preferred attacking style of play. In the 1990 World Cup, Brazil had been eliminated in the round of 16, losing to Argentina, while Italy finished third in the tournament, on home soil, beating England in the match for third place after losing to Argentina in a penalty shootout in the semifinal.

== Route to the final ==
=== Brazil ===
Brazil's route to the final
	Opponent	Result
1	Russia	2–0
2	Cameroon	3–0
3	Sweden	1–1
R16	United States	1–0
QF	Netherlands	3–2
SF	Sweden	1–0

Brazil was in Group B at the World Cup, joined by Cameroon, Russia, and Sweden. Its first game was the tournament opener at Stanford Stadium in California, on June 20 against Russia. Brazil opened the scoring after 26 minutes, when Romário evaded his marker following an in-swinging corner and hit the ball into the goal. Brazil scored again after 52 minutes, when Raí converted a penalty following a foul by Vladislav Ternavsky on Romário, and went on to complete a 2–0 win. Its second game was against Cameroon on June 24, once again at Stanford. Romário gave Brazil the lead after 39 minutes after receiving a pass from Dunga and hitting it past goalkeeper Joseph-Antoine Bell. In the second half, Cameroon defender Rigobert Song was sent off for a foul on Raí, before Márcio Santos and Bebeto added two further goals to complete a 3–0 win for Brazil. The result meant that Brazil had qualified for the round of 16 with one game to spare. Brazil's final group game was against Sweden at the Pontiac Silverdome in Michigan on June 28. Kennet Andersson gave Sweden the lead after 23 minutes, following a long pass by Tomas Brolin, before Romário equalized for Brazil with his third goal of the tournament shortly after halftime. The game finished 1–1, which was sufficient for Brazil to finish as group winner.

Brazil faced the host United States in the round of 16 on July 4, American Independence Day. Brazil's performance through most of the game was described by The Guardian's Paul Wilson as "wholly unconvincing as aspiring champions", until Bebeto scored the game's only goal after 72 minutes. Both teams finished the game with 10 players after Brazil's Leonardo was dismissed for a violent foul while American Fernando Clavijo was sent off for a second bookable offense. In the quarterfinals, Brazil played the Netherlands at the Cotton Bowl in Dallas on July 9. After a goalless first half, Romário gave Brazil the lead from a Bebeto pass after 53 minutes, before Bebeto himself scored a second ten minutes later. The Dutch players disputed the second goal, saying that Romário had been caught by their offside trap when Branco passed forward to him in the build-up, but the goal stood. Rob Witschge of the Netherlands later said that the linesman was "absolutely blind". The Netherlands pulled a goal back a minute later through Dennis Bergkamp, and then equalized with 14 minutes remaining, through Aron Winter. Brazil scored again after 81 minutes when Branco hit a free kick from 30 yards (27 m) to seal a 3–2 win. Brazil's semifinal was against Sweden at the Rose Bowl in Pasadena, California, on July 13. Sweden defended deeply throughout the game and was reduced to 10 players when Jonas Thern was sent off in the 63rd minute for a foul on Dunga. Brazil had much of the possession and several chances throughout the game, but did not score until the 81st minute when Romário headed the ball into the Swedish goal from a Jorginho cross. Brazil won 1–0 and earned a place in the final.

=== Italy ===
Italy's route to the final
	Opponent	Result
1	Republic of Ireland	0–1
2	Norway	1–0
3	Mexico	1–1
R16	Nigeria	2–1 (a.e.t.)
QF	Spain	2–1
SF	Bulgaria	2–1

Italy was drawn in Group E at the finals, alongside Mexico, Norway, and the Republic of Ireland. It began its campaign on June 18 against the Republic of Ireland at Giants Stadium in East Rutherford, New Jersey. Italy was one of the pre-tournament favorites to win the World Cup, but the crowd was predominantly Irish, many of them Irish Americans. Ireland won the game 1–0 through an 11th-minute goal by Ray Houghton, a result later described by The Irish Post as "one of Ireland's greatest ever sporting moments". Italy's second game was against Norway on June 23, once again at Giants Stadium. Goalkeeper Gianluca Pagliuca was sent off after 22 minutes for a professional foul, but Italy recovered to win the game 1–0, Dino Baggio scoring the winner after 69 minutes. Its final group game, against Mexico at RFK Stadium in Washington, D.C., began with all four Group E teams level on points. The Italian supporters were again outnumbered by the opposition, but their team took the lead shortly after halftime on a low shot by Daniele Massaro. Massaro almost added a second after 56 minutes, but then Mexico equalized a minute later through Marcelino Bernal. The game finished 1–1, while Norway and the Republic of Ireland also tied, leaving all four teams on 4 points with identical goal difference. With the most goals scored, Mexico was first in the group, while Norway was bottom with fewest goals. Italy and the Republic of Ireland both had two goals each, but Ireland took second place through its win over Italy. Italy qualified for the next round, however, as one of the better-performing third-place teams, with its progress confirmed when Cameroon was defeated by Russia later that day.

Italy's round of 16 opponent was Nigeria, at Foxboro Stadium in Foxborough, Massachusetts, on July 5. Nigeria took the lead after 25 minutes, when Finidi George took a corner which bounced off Italian defender Paolo Maldini before being struck into the goal by Emmanuel Amunike. After 75 minutes, Italy's Gianfranco Zola, who had come on as a substitute, was sent off for a foul on Augustine Eguavoen, immediately after he had been denied a penalty. Despite this setback, Italy equalized after 88 minutes when Roberto Baggio hit a low shot past the Nigerian goalkeeper. With the score at 1–1, the game went to extra time and the game was decided when Roberto Baggio scored his second goal after 102 minutes, sealing a 2–1 Italian win. Italy's quarterfinal game was against Spain in Foxborough on July 9. Dino Baggio gave Italy the lead after 25 minutes, before Spain's José Luis Caminero equalized shortly before the hour mark. For the second game in a row, Roberto Baggio scored after 88 minutes, scoring from a tight angle following a run into the penalty area, and Italy won 2–1. It returned to Giants Stadium on July 13 for a semifinal against Bulgaria. Bulgaria had defeated previous champions Argentina and Germany en route to the match, but Italy started strongly, Roberto Baggio scoring twice in the first half hour for a 2–0 lead. Bulgaria's Hristo Stoichkov pulled a goal back through a penalty shortly before halftime, and protested about two denied penalty claims in the second half, but Italy held on for a 2–1 win and a place in the final.

== Match ==
=== Summary ===
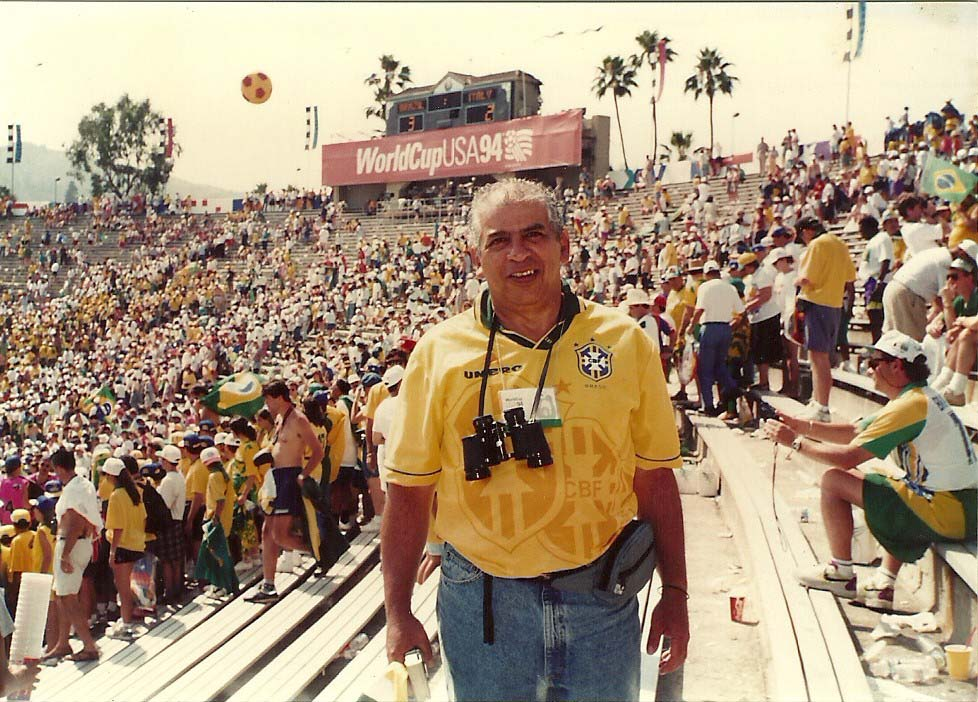
Brazilian radio personality Arnaldo Santos at the game. The penalty shootout score is marked on the scoreboard behind him.

Brazil's Mazinho was booked in the fourth minute for a foul on Nicola Berti. In the 13th minute, Romario had a chance to score with a header from close range, following a cross by Dunga, but his header went straight to the goalkeeper. Four minutes later, Romario passed the ball through to Bebeto on the left side of the penalty area. Instead of shooting, Bebeto attempted a cross, but it deflected behind off Paolo Maldini. Italy then had one of its best chances of the game when Daniele Massaro beat two defenders and was one-on-one with Taffarel, but his shot was directed straight at the Brazilian goalkeeper. After 21 minutes, Brazil's Jorginho had to leave the game following an injury sustained a few minutes previously and was replaced by Cafu. Italy made a replacement after 34 minutes, bringing Luigi Apolloni on for Roberto Mussi, moving Maldini to the left back position. Roberto Baggio attempted a pass through to Antonio Benarrivo late in the first half but Aldair was able to intercept it. Late in the half, Brazil had two further opportunities, first from Romario, whose shot was parried by Gianluca Pagliuca without falling to a Brazilian player, and then through Branco whose free kick was saved. The free kick resulted from a foul by Apolloni on Romario, for which Apolloni received a yellow card, while Italian defender Demetrio Albertini was also booked for not being sufficiently far from the ball during the free kick. The first half concluded with the score at 0–0.

In the second half, Cafu hit a shot that went across the face of the Italian goal, after which Bebeto attempted to score with a header which was saved by Pagliuca and was also flagged for offside. Roberto Baggio had a chance for Italy, when he received a pass from Dino Baggio and was able to run at the Brazilian goal, but Márcio Santos tackled him and kicked the ball out, ending his run. Silva attempted a top-spin shot from distance which bounced off the goalpost, after which Mazinho also had a chance but Pagliuca was able to stop the ball. Other than that, the second half was largely devoid of scoring chances, as Brazil was unable to break through the center-back pairing of Franco Baresi and Paolo Maldini. The lack of attacking play in the game was down to strong holding midfield play by Dino Baggio for Italy, and by both Dunga and Mauro Silva for Brazil.

As extra time began, chances became more plentiful as Brazil began to dominate play. Romário had another chance early in extra time after Pagliuca made an ill-advised decision to come for a cross, leaving the goal exposed, but Bebeto was unable to find him. Roberto Baggio, who had been quiet for most of the game after having picked up an injury earlier in the tournament, had his only sight of goal in the entire game in the first half of extra time, hitting a shot from around 25 yards, but Taffarel pushed the shot over. Zinho had a chance on the stroke of halftime in extra time, hitting his shot well from inside the area, but Pagliuca saved well at his near post. In the second half of extra time, Romário missed a golden chance to hand Brazil the trophy, as Cafu had found him inside the six yard box. With Pagliuca at least four yards away from him on the other side of the goal, and the entire goal to aim at, the off balance Romário put his shot wide of the post.

This was the first time the World Cup was decided on penalties. Italian captain Baresi took the first penalty and blazed his penalty over the bar. Brazilian center-back Márcio Santos went next, but Pagliuca saved the Brazilian defender's effort low to his right. Demetrio Albertini went next for Italy, scoring his penalty into the top corner. Romário was next for Brazil, and he scored his penalty, placing it so far in the corner that it went in off the post, tying the score at 1–1. Alberico Evani went third for Italy, he scored, putting his penalty high and in the middle, as Taffarel dove to the right. Branco went next for Brazil, and he scored in the bottom left corner. Massaro, who had scored twice in the Champions League Final less than two months previously, went next for Italy, but he was unable to put the ball in Taffarel's net just as he had been unable to do in the game, as the Brazilian keeper saved to his left. Brazilian captain Dunga was next, and he comfortably placed his shot into the bottom left corner, making it game point. With Italy needing to score to keep its dreams alive, talisman Roberto Baggio stepped up to take the penalty. In what would become an infamous moment in World Cup history, Baggio blazed his penalty over the bar, in similar fashion to Baresi, and giving Brazil their fourth title.

=== Details ===
July 17, 1994
12:30 p.m. PDT (UTC−7)

Brazil	0–0 (a.e.t.)	Italy
Penalties
Márcio Santos (penalty missed); Romário (penalty scored); Branco (penalty scored); Dunga (penalty scored)	3–2	(penalty missed) Baresi; (penalty scored) Albertini; (penalty scored) Evani; (penalty missed) Massaro; (penalty missed) R. Baggio

Rose Bowl, Pasadena
Attendance: 94,194
Referee: Sándor Puhl (Hungary)

Brazil	Italy

GK	1	Cláudio Taffarel
RB	2	Jorginho		(substituted off) 21'
CB	13	Aldair
CB	15	Márcio Santos
LB	6	Branco
RM	17	Mazinho	(yellow card) 4'
CM	5	Mauro Silva
CM	8	Dunga (c)
LM	9	Zinho		(substituted off) 106'
CF	7	Bebeto
CF	11	Romário
Substitutions:
DF	14	Cafu	(yellow card) 87'	(substituted on) 21'
FW	21	Viola		(substituted on) 106'
Manager:
Carlos Alberto Parreira

GK	1	Gianluca Pagliuca
RB	8	Roberto Mussi		(substituted off) 35'
CB	6	Franco Baresi (c)
CB	5	Paolo Maldini
LB	3	Antonio Benarrivo
RM	14	Nicola Berti
CM	13	Dino Baggio		(substituted off) 95'
CM	11	Demetrio Albertini	(yellow card) 42'
LM	16	Roberto Donadoni
CF	10	Roberto Baggio
CF	19	Daniele Massaro
Substitutions:
DF	2	Luigi Apolloni	(yellow card) 41'	(substituted on) 35'
MF	17	Alberico Evani		(substituted on) 95'
Manager:
Arrigo Sacchi

Officials

- Linesmen:
  - Venancio Zárate (Paraguay)
  - Mohammad Fanaei (Iran)
- Fourth official: Francisco Oscar Lamolina (Argentina)

Game rules

- 90 minutes
- 30 minutes of extra time if necessary
- Penalty shootout if scores still level
- Two substitutions permitted, plus one for the goalkeeper

== Post-match ==
U.S. vice president Al Gore, UEFA president Lennart Johansson and FIFA president João Havelange were among those present at the stands during the awards ceremony. In the presentation ceremony, Gore handed the trophy to Brazil's captain, Dunga.

== In popular culture ==
In 2023, Italian comedy metal band Nanowar of Steel and Joakim Brodén released a song called "Pasadena 1994" about the match.

== See also ==
- 1970 FIFA World Cup final – the previous final contested between Brazil and Italy
- 1999 FIFA Women's World Cup final – another World Cup final that was also held at the Rose Bowl and also decided by penalty shootout after neither finalist scored
- 2026 FIFA World Cup final – the most recent World Cup final held in the East Coast of the United States contested between Spain and Argentina
