= Jorginho (footballer, born 1964) =

Brazilian footballer

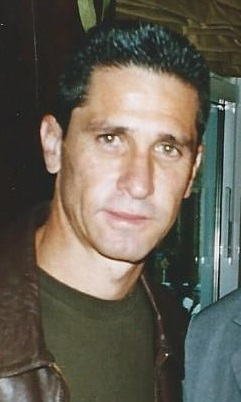
- Jorginho in 2005

Personal information
- Full name: Jorge de Amorim Campos
- Date of birth: 17 August 1964 (age 62)
- Place of birth: Rio de Janeiro, Brazil
- Height: 1.73 m (5 ft 8 in)
- Position: Right back

Senior career*
Years	Team	Apps	(Gls)
1982–1984	America-RJ	20	(0)
1984–1989	Flamengo	55	(2)
1989–1992	Bayer Leverkusen	87	(9)
1992–1995	Bayern Munich	67	(6)
1995–1998	Kashima Antlers	103	(17)
1999	São Paulo	13	(1)
2000–2001	Vasco da Gama	28	(2)
2002	Fluminense	4	(0)
Total		510	(42)

International career
1987–1995	Brazil	64	(3)

Managerial career
- 2006: America-RJ
- 2006–2010: Brazil (assistant)
- 2010: Goiás
- 2011: Figueirense
- 2012: Kashima Antlers
- 2013: Flamengo
- 2013: Ponte Preta
- 2014: Al Wasl
- 2015–2016: Vasco da Gama
- 2017: Bahia
- 2018: Ceará
- 2018: Vasco da Gama
- 2019: Ponte Preta
- 2019: Coritiba
- 2020: Coritiba
- 2021: Atlético Goianiense
- 2021: Cuiabá
- 2022: Atlético Goianiense
- 2022: Vasco da Gama
- 2024: Buriram United
- 2024: Coritiba
Medal record
Men's football
Representing Brazil
Olympic Games
Silver medal – second place	1988 Seoul	Team
Pan American Games
Silver medal – second place	1983 Caracas	Team
FIFA World Cup
Winner	1994 United States
Copa América
Runner-up	1995 Uruguay
FIFA U-20 World Cup
Winner	1983 Mexico
South American U-20 Championship
Winner	1983 Bolivia
- * Club domestic league appearances and goals

Jorge de Amorim Campos (born 17 August 1964), better known as Jorginho, is a Brazilian professional football manager and former player.

Jorginho played as an attacking right back in the Brazilian national team and for five different clubs. He also spent six years in Germany with Bayer Leverkusen and Bayern Munich and three in Japan with Kashima Antlers; at international level, he was part of the Brazilian team that won the 1994 World Cup.

After retiring in 2002, Jorginho took up coaching for a short period before working as the assistant to head coach Dunga with the Brazil national team for four years. He later returned to coaching duties, being in charge of several clubs in his home country as well as his former side Kashima Antlers in Japan and Al Wasl in the UAE.

== Playing career ==
=== Club ===
Born in Rio de Janeiro, Jorginho started playing professionally for local side América Football Club, moving after just one season to Clube de Regatas do Flamengo.

In 1989, he went overseas, joining German Bundesliga outfit Bayer 04 Leverkusen. With most teams in the country playing in a 5–3–2 or 3–5–2 formation, his tremendous offensive ability was put to good use, and he scored five goals for Bayer during his third and final season.

Staying in the country, Jorginho signed with league giants FC Bayern Munich in 1992–93, backed by a defensive line which included Olaf Thon, Thomas Helmer and later Lothar Matthäus. He won the national title in his second year, but after the loan return of Markus Babbel, a central defender who also operated on the right flank, he was restricted to just ten league contests in 1994–95.

After still appearing with success for J.League's Kashima Antlers, winning both the league and MVP titles in 1996, Jorginho returned to Brazil and played until 39, with São Paulo FC, CR Vasco da Gama and Fluminense Football Club. In 2001, he paired at Vasco with both Romário and Bebeto, but did not seem to get along with the pair.

=== International ===
Jorginho was capped 64 times for the Brazil national team, scoring three goals. He played at both the 1990 and the 1994 FIFA World Cups.

In the latter edition, he played all the matches as the nation emerged victorious. Jorginho was booked in the second-round match against the United States, but was named in the All-Star squad a few days later. He contributed two assists in the tournament, including a cross in the semifinals against Sweden that helped Romário score the winning goal. He also performed solidly against Italy in the final, including a play in which he freed himself from a double-team. However, he got injured after just twenty minutes of play, and was replaced by Cafú.

In 2006, Jorginho was hired as the head coach of first side América. However, on 31 July of that same year, he was hired as Brazil's assistant, joining the staff of former national side teammate Dunga. In two 2008 friendlies, he took over for the manager, following Dunga's dismissal in the previous game and subsequent ban from the Brazilian Football Confederation; he led the team to two 1–0 wins, against the Republic of Ireland and Sweden. Both left the national team following the 2010 World Cup quarterfinal loss against Holland.

Internationally, Jorginho also helped the Olympic team win silver at the 1988 Summer Olympics in Seoul.

== Managerial career ==
Jorginho started his coaching career with his first club America in December 2005. In the following year, he was appointed Dunga's assistant at the Brazil national team, remaining with the role until 2010.

On 30 August 2010, Jorginho was announced as the new Goiás head coach. Dismissed on 8 November, he was appointed head coach of Figueirense the following 1 March.

On 21 December 2011, Jorginho left Figueira and was named at the helm of Kashima Antlers, a club he already represented as a player. He returned to Brazil on 17 March 2013, being appointed Flamengo head coach, but was sacked on 6 June.

Jorginho was subsequently in charge of Ponte Preta and Al-Wasl before being named head coach of former club Vasco on 16 August 2015. Despite failing to avoid relegation, he was maintained and won the 2016 Campeonato Carioca; after achieving immediate promotion, he resigned on 28 November 2016.

On 1 June 2017, Jorginho was appointed head coach of Bahia, but his reign only lasted nearly two months. The following 21 May he replaced fired Marcelo Chamusca at the helm of Ceará, but resigned on 4 June after alleging "personal reasons"; the day after his resignation, he was announced back at Vasco.

Jorginho was fired on 13 August 2018, after only 10 matches. During the 2019 season, he coached second division sides Ponte Preta and Coritiba, achieving top tier promotion with the latter side but still leaving on 11 December after failing to agree new terms.

On 21 August 2020, Jorginho was named back at the helm of Coritiba, replacing sacked Eduardo Barroca. He was himself relieved from his duties on 25 October, with the club in the relegation zone.

On 5 April 2021, Jorginho was appointed head coach of Atlético Goianiense still in the top tier. He resigned on 15 May, after just 13 matches.

On 3 July 2021, Jorginho took over first division newcomers Cuiabá. He managed to keep the club in the first division, but left when his contract ended after failing to agree new terms.

On 16 May 2022, Jorginho returned to Atlético, replacing sacked Umberto Louzer, but was himself dismissed on 27 August. On 5 September, he returned to Vasco in the second tier, and left on 10 November after achieving promotion.

On 25 March 2024, Jorginho has accepted an offer from Buriram United in the Thai League, with the team's aim being to win the domestic championship and succeed in the AFC Champions League. On 27 July, he returned to Coritiba for a third spell as head coach, but departed by mutual consent on 11 November.

== Personal life ==
Jorginho is a born-again Christian. Alongside compatriots Cláudio Taffarel and Bismarck – also footballers – he was featured sharing his faith in a special version of the film Jesus, produced and distributed during the 1998 World Cup.

He also founded the club Bola Pra Frente in his Rio de Janeiro slum of Guadalupe.

== Managerial statistics ==
As of 11 November 2024

Managerial record by team and tenure
Team	Nat.	From	To	Record					Ref.
Team	Nat.	From	To	G	W	D	L	Win %	Ref.
America-RJ	(Brazil)	December 2005	April 2006	14	6	3	5	42.86	
Goiás	(Brazil)	29 August 2010	8 November 2010	20	6	4	10	30.00	
Figueirense	(Brazil)	1 March 2011	4 December 2011	47	21	14	12	44.68	
Kashima Antlers	(Japan)	21 December 2011	2012	34	12	10	12	35.29	
Flamengo	(Brazil)	17 March 2013	6 June 2013	14	7	4	3	50.00	
Ponte Preta	(Brazil)	25 August 2013	13 December 2013	32	8	11	13	25.00	
Vasco da Gama	(Brazil)	16 August 2015	28 November 2016	87	44	24	19	50.57	
Bahia	(Brazil)	2 June 2017	31 July 2017	14	4	6	4	28.57	
Ceará	(Brazil)	21 May 2018	4 June 2018	3	0	0	3	0.00	
Vasco da Gama	(Brazil)	5 June 2018	13 August 2018	10	4	1	5	40.00	
Ponte Preta	(Brazil)	8 February 2019	25 August 2019	31	13	11	7	41.94	
Coritiba	(Brazil)	23 September 2019	11 December 2019	15	9	5	1	60.00	
Coritiba	(Brazil)	21 August 2020	25 October 2020	13	3	4	6	23.08	
Atlético Goianiense	(Brazil)	5 April 2021	15 May 2021	13	8	4	1	61.54	
Cuiabá	(Brazil)	5 July 2021	16 December 2021	32	10	14	8	31.25	
Atlético Goianiense	(Brazil)	16 May 2022	27 August 2022	27	10	6	11	37.04	
Vasco da Gama	(Brazil)	5 September 2022	10 November 2022	10	5	2	3	50.00	
Buriram United	(Thailand)	25 March 2024	21 May 2024	9	7	2	0	77.78	
Coritiba	(Brazil)	27 July 2024	11 November 2024	18	8	3	7	44.44	
Career Total				443	185	128	130	41.76	

== Honours ==
=== Player ===
Flamengo

- Copa União: 1987 (Note: Sport Recife were declared to be the winners of the 1987 Campeonato Brasileiro by the Brazilian Supreme Court. Flamengo won the Copa União Green Module, which is also regarded as a national title by the club and Brazilian Football Confederation.)
- Campeonato Carioca: 1986
- Taça Guanabara: 1984, 1988

Bayern Munich

- Bundesliga: 1993–94

Kashima Antlers

- J.League: 1996, 1998

Vasco da Gama

- Campeonato Brasileiro Série A: 2000
- Copa Mercosur: 2000
- Taça Guanabara: 2000

Fluminense

- Campeonato Carioca: 2002

Brazil

- FIFA World Cup: 1994
- FIFA U-20 World Cup: 1983
- Summer Olympic Games silver medal: 1988
- Pan American Games silver medal: 1983
- Rous Cup: 1987

Individual

- FIFA Fair Play Award: 1991
- World XI: 1991
- FIFA World Cup All-Star Team: 1994
- J.League MVP: 1996
- J.League Best XI: 1996
- J.League Cup MVP: 1997

=== Manager ===
Kashima Antlers

- J.League Cup: 2012
- Suruga Bank Championship: 2012

Vasco da Gama

- Campeonato Carioca: 2016

Buriram United

- Thai League: 2023–24
