= Branco (footballer) =

Brazilian footballer and manager (born 1964)

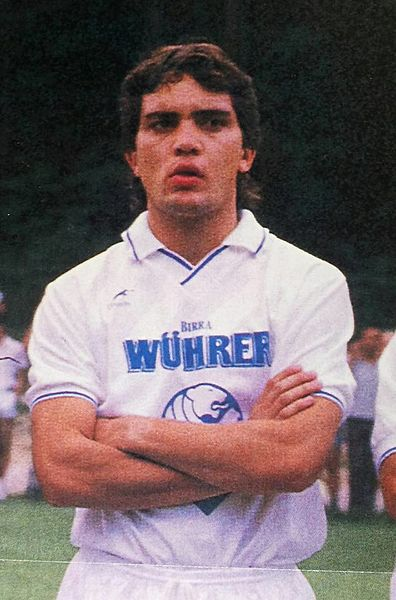
- Branco with Brescia in 1986–87

Personal information
- Full name: Cláudio Ibrahim Vaz Leal
- Date of birth: 4 April 1964 (age 62)
- Place of birth: Bagé, Brazil
- Height: 1.80 m (5 ft 11 in)
- Position: Left back

Senior career*
Years	Team	Apps	(Gls)
1980–1981	Guarany	15	(2)
1982–1986	Fluminense	46	(21)
1986–1988	→ Brescia (loan)	50	(12)
1988–1991	Porto	60	(17)
1991–1993	Genoa	71	(18)
1993	Grêmio	6	(1)
1994	Fluminense		
1994	Corinthians	20	(4)
1995	Flamengo	35	(9)
1995	Internacional		
1996	Middlesbrough	9	(0)
1997	Mogi Mirim		
1997	NY/NJ MetroStars	11	(1)
1998	Fluminense	?	(?)
Total		323	(80)

International career
1985–1995	Brazil	72	(9)

Managerial career
- 2012: Figueirense
- 2013: Sobradinho
- 2013: Guarani
Medal record
Men's Football
Representing Brazil
FIFA World Cup
Winner	1994
Copa América
Winner	1989 Brazil
Runner-up	1991 Chile
- * Club domestic league appearances and goals

Cláudio Ibrahim Vaz Leal (born 4 April 1964), better known as Branco, is a Brazilian former footballer who played as a left back. A member of the Brazilian team which won the 1994 FIFA World Cup, Branco was a free-kick specialist with accurate control of the ball.

During a match against Argentina in the 1990 FIFA World Cup, Branco was allegedly drugged with Rohypnol during half time. The following day, he reported that he had felt dizzy after drinking water handed to him by assistant coach Galíndez under Carlos Bilardo’s orders, and noticed that an Argentina national team player had been prevented from drinking from the same bottle. In December 2004, Diego Maradona insinuated during a TV interview that Branco's accusations were true. Bilardo later said "I don't know, but that doesn't mean that it didn't happen, I can't say for certain that it didn't happen."

== Club career ==
At club level, Branco played for Internacional (1980–81), Fluminense (1981–86, 1994 and 1998), Brescia (1986–88), FC Porto (1988–91), Genoa (1991–93), Grêmio (1992–94), Flamengo (1995), Corinthians (1995), Middlesbrough (1996), and MetroStars (1997). Branco's late career in England and the United States was marred by weight problems.

During his spell at Middlesbrough, he scored twice, both goals coming against Hereford in the League Cup second round, once at home in the first leg and once away in the second. However, he played just nine times in the Premier League, and in late 1996 he left the club on a free transfer.

== International career ==
Branco appeared 72 times for Brazil, between April 1985 and February 1995, and scored nine goals. He took part in three World Cups (1986, 1990, and 1994).

In the 1990 FIFA World Cup, the Brazilians were considered one of the favourites. Brazil were beaten 1-0 by Argentina in the round of 16. During an injury break in the match, Branco drank from a water bottle provided by Argentine physio Miguel di Lorenzo. The drink was allegedly laced with tranquillisers. Branco said he felt drowsy after the drink. Dubbed the "holy water" scandal by the Argentinian media, Diego Maradona later insinuated the allegation to be true in a 2004 interview.

After sitting out the first four games at the 1994 World Cup, he replaced Leonardo on the left after Leonardo was banned for a deliberate elbow on Tab Ramos in the second-round game against the United States. Branco scored with a late free kick from 35 metres to eliminate the Netherlands in the quarter-finals, and took one of Brazil's penalties in the shootout when they beat Italy in the final. He played in a total of twelve matches in three World Cup tournaments.

== Personal life ==
Branco is of Lebanese descent.

== Honours ==
=== Club ===
Internacional

- Campeonato Gaúcho: 1981

Fluminense

- Campeonato Brasileiro Série A: 1984
- Campeonato Carioca: 1983, 1984, 1985

Porto

- Primeira Liga: 1989–90
- Supertaça Cândido de Oliveira: 1990

Grêmio

- Campeonato Gaúcho: 1993

=== International ===
Brazil

- FIFA World Cup: 1994
- Copa América: 1989
