= João Paulo (footballer, born 1964) =

Brazilian footballer

Personal information
- Full name: Sérgio Luís Donizetti
- Date of birth: 7 September 1964 (age 62)
- Place of birth: Campinas, São Paulo, Brazil
- Height: 1.71 m (5 ft 7 1/2 in)
- Position: Striker

Senior career*
Years	Team	Apps	(Gls)
1983–1989	Guarani FC	81	(17)
1989–1994	A.S. Bari	84	(22)
1994	CR Vasco da Gama	14	(0)
1995	Goiás EC	22	(3)
1996–1998	Corinthians		
1999–2003	União São João		
2000	Mito HollyHock (loan)		
2004	Taquaritinga		
2004	Inter de Limeira		

International career
1987–1991	Brazil	17	(4)
Medal record
Men's football
Representing Brazil
Olympic Games
Silver medal – second place	1988 Seoul	Team competition
Pan American Games
Gold medal – first place	1987 Indianapolis	Team competition
- * Club domestic league appearances and goals

Sérgio Luís Donizetti (born 7 September 1964 in Campinas, Brazil), best known as João Paulo, is a Brazilian former association footballer, who played as a striker.

== Club career ==
=== Bari ===
João Paulo joined Italian club Bari in 1989, and formed a formidable striking partnership with Pietro Maiellaro and later with Romanian Florin Raducioiu. After scoring six goals in 33 Serie A matches in the 1989–90 season, he would score 12 times in the 1990–1991 season, the most memorable of which was a double against A.C. Milan on the penultimate round of the season, thus sealing the title for another club, Sampdoria, which won its first ever (and so far the only) Serie A title in that club's history.

He started the following season brightly and was on his usually excellent form. But in their third match at home to Sampdoria, in torrential rain, his leg was broken by defender Marco Lanna in a tackle along the sidelines which ended his season. It took him an entire year to recover and he stayed on with Bari after its relegation to Serie B for two more seasons until 1994.

== International career ==
João Paulo also played for the Brazil national team, scoring twice (one goal apiece against Uruguay, and in the notorious match against Argentina) in the Copa América in 1991.

He also competed for Brazil at the 1988 Summer Olympics.

== Career statistics ==
=== Club ===
Club performance			League	
Season	Club	League	Apps	Goals
Brazil			League	
1982	Guarani	Série A	0	0
1983	Guarani	Série A	0	0
1984	Guarani	Série B	5	0
1985	Guarani	Série A	24	2
1986	Guarani	Série A	30	11
1987	Guarani	Série A	13	4
1988	Guarani	Série A	9	0
1989	Guarani	Série A	0	0
Italy			League	
1989–90	Bari	Serie A	33	6
1990–91	Bari	Serie A	29	12
1991–92	Bari	Serie A	3	0
1992–93	Bari	Serie B	11	2
1993–94	Bari	Serie B	8	2
Brazil			League	
1994	Vasco da Gama	Série A	14	0
1995	Ponte Preta	Série B	0	0
1995	Goiás	Série A	22	3
1996	Corinthians Paulista	Série A	0	0
1996	Sport Recife	Série A	17	1
1997	Bahia	Série A	0	0
1998	União São João	Série B	0	0
1998	Vitória	Série A	1	0
1999	Etti Jundiaí		0	0
1999	União São João	Série B	0	0
2000	União São João	Série B	0	0
Japan			League	
2000	Mito HollyHock	J2 League	15	4
Brazil			League	
2001	CSA		0	0
2001	União São João	Série B	0	0
2002	União São João	Série B	0	0
2002	Guarani	Série A	16	2
Country	Brazil		151	23
Country	Italy		84	22
Country	Japan		15	4
Total			250	49

=== International ===
Brazil national team
Year	Apps	Goals
1987	3	1
1988	1	0
1989	2	0
1990	0	0
1991	11	3
Total	17	4

== Honours ==
Bari

- Mitropa Cup: 1989-90

Guarani

- Campeonato Brasileiro Série A runner-up: 1986
- Campeonato Paulista runner-up: 1988

Brazil

- Pan American Games: 1987
- Summer Olympics silver medal: 1988
- Copa América runner-up : 1991
