= Luís Henrique (footballer, born 1968) =

Brazilian footballer

Personal information
- Full name: Luís Henrique Pereira dos Santos
- Date of birth: 20 August 1968 (age 58)
- Place of birth: Jequitaí, Brazil
- Height: 1.73 m (5 ft 8 in)
- Position: Midfielder

Senior career*
Years	Team	Apps	(Gls)
1987	Catuense		
1987	Flamengo		
1988–1990	Catuense		
1990–1992	Bahia		
1992	Palmeiras	3	(0)
1992–1993	Monaco	39	(3)
1994–1997	Fluminense	69	(10)
1998	Paraná Clube	2	(0)
2000–2001	Veranópolis		
2001	Esportivo		
2001–2002	Al Jazira		

International career^{‡}
1990–1993	Brazil	22	(7)
- * Club domestic league appearances and goals as of 31 May 2012 ‡ National team caps and goals as of 31 May 2012

Luís Henrique Pereira dos Santos (born 20 August 1968 in Jequitaí) more commonly known simply as Luís Henrique is a Brazilian footballer who played as a midfielder. He participated at two Copa América tournaments for Brazil in 1991 and 1993.
