= Leonardo Araújo =

Brazilian football executive and former player and manager

Leonardo
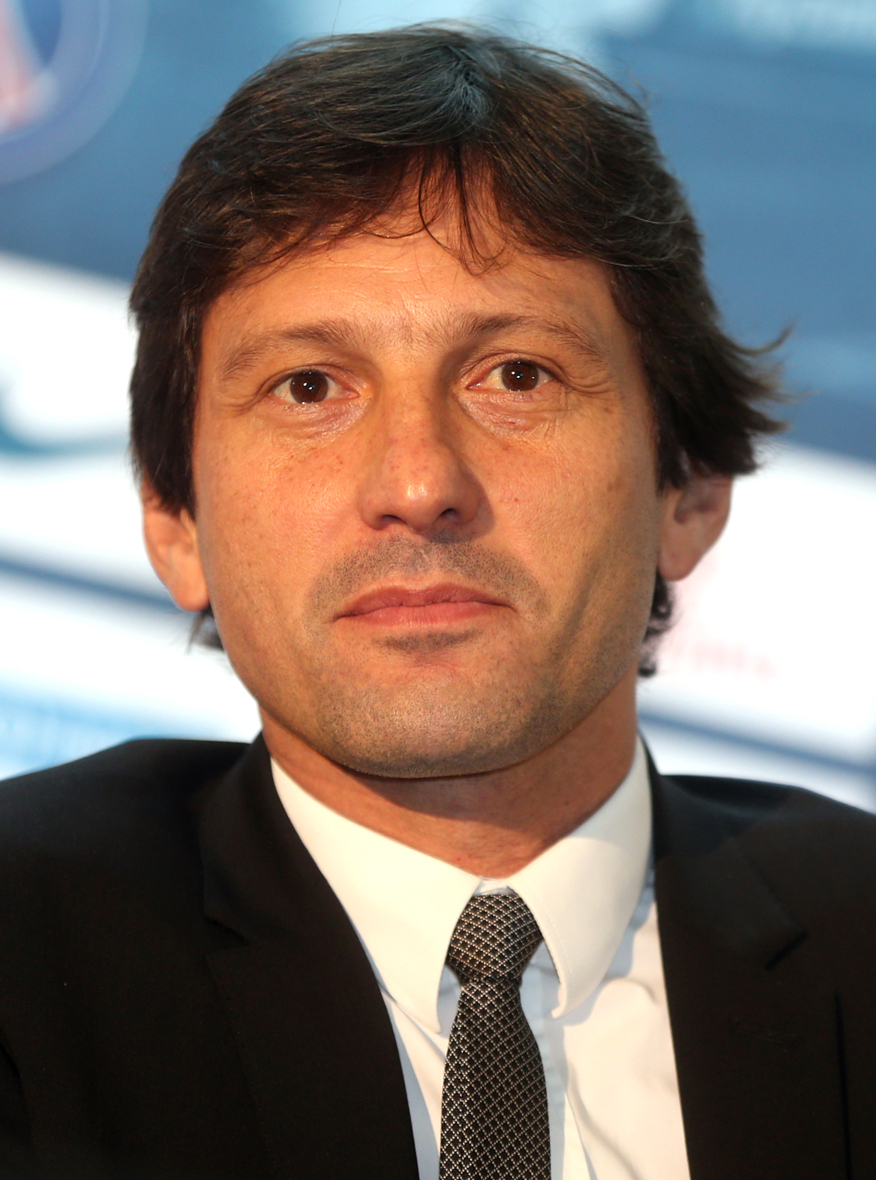
- Leonardo in 2013

Personal information
- Full name: Leonardo Nascimento de Araújo
- Date of birth: 5 September 1969 (age 57)
- Place of birth: Niterói, Brazil
- Height: 1.78 m (5 ft 10 in)
- Positions: Attacking midfielder; left winger; left-back

Youth career
- 1984–1987: Flamengo

Senior career*
Years	Team	Apps	(Gls)
1987–1990	Flamengo	52	(0)
1990–1991	São Paulo	44	(1)
1991–1993	Valencia	70	(7)
1993–1994	São Paulo	12	(3)
1994–1996	Kashima Antlers	49	(30)
1996–1997	Paris Saint-Germain	34	(7)
1997–2001	AC Milan	96	(22)
2001	São Paulo	13	(0)
2002	Flamengo	0	(0)
2002–2003	AC Milan	1	(0)
Total		371	(70)

International career
1989	Brazil U20	6	(1)
1990–2001	Brazil	55	(7)

Managerial career
- 2009–2010: AC Milan
- 2010–2011: Inter Milan
- 2017: Antalyaspor
Medal record
Men's Football
Representing Brazil
FIFA World Cup
Winner	1994 USA
Runner-up	1998 France
FIFA Confederations Cup
Winner	1997 Saudi Arabia
Copa América
Winner	1997 Bolivia
Runner-up	1995 Uruguay
FIFA U-20 World Cup
Third place	1989 Saudi Arabia
U-20 South American Championship
Winner	1988 Argentina
- * Club domestic league appearances and goals

Leonardo Nascimento de Araújo (born 5 September 1969), known as Leonardo Araújo or simply Leonardo, is a Brazilian football executive and former player and manager. In July 2026, he joined the Italian Football Federation as an adviser to technical director Paolo Maldini.

A versatile player, Leonardo was employed in several positions throughout his career, including as an attacking midfielder, left winger, and left-back; his best-known and most successful period was at AC Milan, in the role of attacking midfielder (or trequartista) behind the forwards. He played for teams in Brazil, Spain, Japan, France and Italy, winning titles with Flamengo, São Paulo, Kashima Antlers and Milan.

A former Brazil international, Leonardo played in the 1994 World Cup winning side, as well as the team that finished runners-up in the 1998 edition of the tournament. He also represented his nation in two Copa América tournaments, reaching the final in 1995, and winning the title in 1997, also claiming the FIFA Confederations Cup in the same year.

Following his retirement, Leonardo also served as a coach for Italian side Milan, and successively as coach of crosstown rivals Inter Milan, where he won a Coppa Italia title in 2011. From 2011 to 2013, he was sporting director of his former club Paris Saint-Germain (PSG). He coached Antalyaspor in 2017 before returning to Milan as sporting director in 2018. In 2019, Leonardo returned to PSG as sporting director, until he was sacked in 2022.

== Early and personal life ==
Leonardo was born and raised in Niterói, Brazil.

Divorced from his first wife with whom he had three children (one boy, two girls), he is married to Sky Italia presenter Anna Billó, with whom he has two sons.

== Club career ==
Leonardo began his career with the Brazilian club Flamengo in 1987; at just 17, he was given the opportunity to play with his hero Zico plus Leandro, Bebeto and Renato Gaúcho, and to take part in winning his first Brazilian championship. In 1990, Leonardo signed with São Paulo, and in 1991, Leonardo, Raí, and other young talents were assembled as part of the so-called 'esquadrão tricolor' ("three-coloured squad") under the command of Brazilian legend Telê Santana, giving Leonardo his second Brazilian championship.

Later that year, he made the switch to European football, signing with the Spanish club Valencia. After two seasons with Valencia, he returned to Brazil for a brief stint with São Paulo in 1993, during which time the team won several titles, including the prestigious Copa Libertadores and Intercontinental Cup.

In 1994, after the World Cup, Leonardo signed with the Kashima Antlers of the newly formed Japanese J1 League. Leonardo continued his success in Kashima, again playing with his idol and friend Zico. In 1996, he returned to Europe, this time signing with French club Paris Saint-Germain (PSG), where he again proved to be successful, one of his goals helping them to oust Liverpool out of the semi-finals of the UEFA Cup Winners' Cup.

At this point in his career, Leonardo had mostly stopped playing as a left-back and moved into the midfield, sometimes on the left flank, as a winger and sometimes in the centre, as an advanced playmaker, or as a supporting striker, due to his technical skills, vision and tactical intelligence. Already in Japan, this had resulted in some spectacular goals for Leonardo, a trend which continued in Europe.

In the summer of 1997, he signed with Italian team AC Milan for €8.5 million from PSG. With Milan, he became a prominent part of a star-studded lineup on the left wing. He played four full seasons with the club, winning the 1998–99 Serie A title, in which he played a key role with his prolific performances, scoring 12 goals. In total, he scored 22 goals in 177 games for Milan, before returning to Brazil with São Paulo and Flamengo. He later returned to Milan and finished his career with the team in 2003, winning the 2002–03 Coppa Italia title.

== International career ==
Leonardo was part of the Brazil under-20 team that placed third in the 1989 FIFA World Youth Championship. He made his full international debut for Brazil in 1990. He was selected as a left-back for the 1994 FIFA World Cup, keeping the young Roberto Carlos out of the team, much to the latter's chagrin. Leonardo played well in the first group games but was then given a four-match suspension for elbowing the American midfielder Tab Ramos in the head in the round of 16, causing a skull fracture that hospitalized him for three and a half months. Leonardo's suspension prevented him from participating in the remainder of the competition. At the time, it was the second longest ban imposed in World Cup history, after Italian defender Mauro Tassotti's eight-game suspension for breaking the nose of Spaniard Luis Enrique in the quarter-final at the same tournament. The record was broken when Uruguayan striker Luis Suárez was banned for biting Italian defender Giorgio Chiellini in his team's final group match of the 2014 FIFA World Cup. Brazil went on to win the title, defeating Italy on penalties in the final after a 0–0 draw.

In 1995, he took part in the Copa América with Brazil, where the team reached the final, scoring one goal in 3–0 win over Colombia in the team's final group match; Leonardo did not feature in the final, however, in which Brazil lost out to hosts Uruguay 5–3 on penalties after a 1–1 draw.

In 1997, Leonardo was given the number 10 shirt for the national team. He was an important member of the team that won the Copa América in 1997, starting in the 3–1 victory over hosts Bolivia in the final; he also won the FIFA Confederations Cup later that year, but was an unused substitute in the 6–0 final victory over Australia.

Leonardo played all seven games in his second World Cup in 1998, helping Brazil to a second-place finish, after a 3–0 loss to hosts France in the final. In the second opening round match against Morocco, he netted one shot and began celebrating, but was later called off-side.

He was last selected to play for Brazil in the 2002 World Cup qualifying campaign and ended his international career in 2002 with 60 caps and 8 goals for Brazil.

== Style of play ==
A versatile left-footed midfielder, Leonardo was capable of playing in several positions along the pitch; his favoured role was as a playmaker in midfield, either as a left winger, or in a more central role, as an attacking midfielder or as a supporting striker, due to his ability to create chances for teammates, although he was also capable of functioning as a central midfielder, in a deep-lying playmaking role, as a forward, and was even deployed as left-back or wing-back throughout his career, in particular in his youth. An elegant and creative player, Leonardo was mainly regarded for his technical skills, as well as his vision, and tactical intelligence as a footballer, which made him an assist provider, although he was capable of scoring goals, as well as creating them, due to his accuracy from set-pieces and powerful striking ability from distance, and was known to be a specialist from dead ball situations. Despite his talent and reputation as one of the best Brazilian men's footballers of his generation, he was also often injury prone throughout his career.

== Outside football ==
Since 2002, Leonardo has dedicated himself to social works with the Fundação Gol de Letra, along with his friend, former player Raí.

Leonardo worked for BBC Television in the United Kingdom during the 2006 World Cup as one of their Match of the Day analysts, alongside another former World Cup winner, Marcel Desailly. He appeared again as a Match of the Day analyst on 1 June 2007 alongside Alan Hansen and Alan Shearer. This was the first England game at the new Wembley Stadium finishing 1–1 with Brazil.

== Coaching career ==
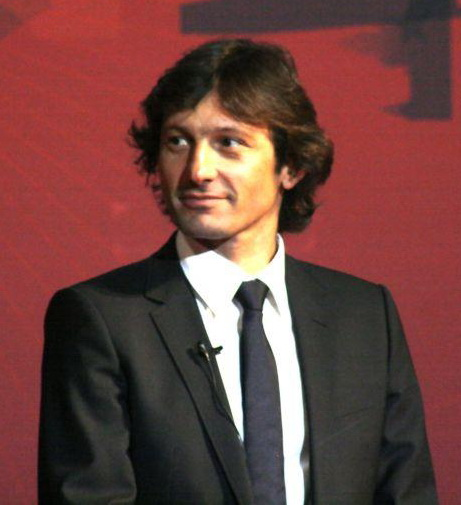
Leonardo in 2008

In December 2007, Leonardo was interviewed for the vacant position of director of football at Premier League side West Ham United.

=== AC Milan ===
In early 2008, Leonardo was appointed technical director of his former club AC Milan. Later that same year, he obtained Italian citizenship after 12 years in Italy as a resident.

After Carlo Ancelotti left Milan to become the manager of Chelsea at the end of May 2009, Leonardo was named head coach of Milan despite still lacking the required coaching badges (he was set to attend a UEFA A coaching course in June 2009). He was, however, exempted from requiring a UEFA Pro license, which is mandatory for Serie A managers, due to being a former World Cup winner as a player. Leonardo wasted no time in declaring that he wanted his team to play attractive attacking football, even invoking the name of his old mentor, Telê Santana.

After a poor start of season, featuring a shock 0–4 loss to crosstown rivals Inter Milan, that started speculation about his possible dismissal from the head coaching post at Milan, results started improving for the rossoneri under Leonardo, also thanks to the application of a 4–2–1–3 tactic (nicknamed also "4–2–fantasy" by Milan vice-president Adriano Galliani). This tactic, quite unusual in Italian football and greatly focusing on creative players such as Ronaldinho, Andrea Pirlo and Clarence Seedorf, led Milan to improved results at both Serie A and UEFA Champions League level, including a remarkable 3–2 win at the Santiago Bernabéu Stadium against Real Madrid and a 3–0 away win to Juventus which enabled Leonardo's side to finish in second place at the half-way point of the season, six points shy of leaders Inter with a game in hand. However, the path to the Champions League final was halted prematurely as Milan were eliminated in the first knockout round by Manchester United in a 2–7 aggregate loss (2–3, 0–4).

In the final weeks of the season, it was speculated that Leonardo could leave Milan at the end of the season. In April 2010, Leonardo confirmed divergences with club owner and Prime Minister of Italy Silvio Berlusconi, defining their relationship as "difficult". It was confirmed that Leonardo would leave Milan by mutual agreement after their season ending game against Juventus. Leonardo waved an emotional goodbye to a packed San Siro, as he managed his side's last game with a 3–0 win against Juventus.

=== Inter Milan ===
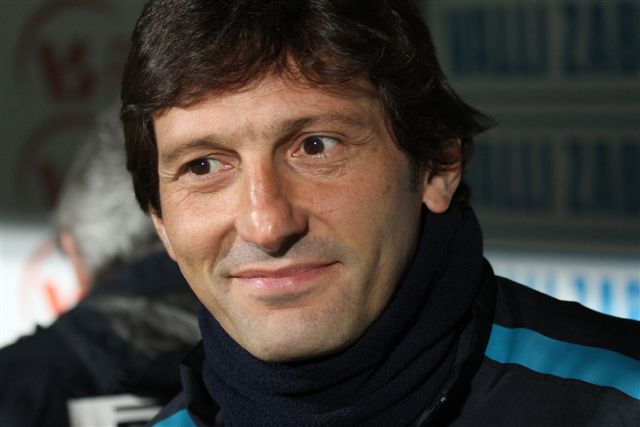
Leonardo with Inter Milan in 2011

On 24 December 2010, after days of speculation, it was confirmed Leonardo would take over as head coach of fresh FIFA Club World Cup champions Inter Milan, replacing Rafael Benítez in a somewhat controversial move, due to the Brazilian's long career with rivals Milan as both player and manager; he agreed an 18-month contract due to expire on 30 June 2012. Leonardo started extremely well, collecting 30 points from 12 games with an average of 2.5 points per game, better than his predecessors Benítez and José Mourinho. On 6 March 2011, Leonardo set a new Italian Serie A record by collecting 33 points in 13 games; the previous record was 32 points in 13 games, achieved by Fabio Capello in 2004–05.

On 15 March 2011, Leonardo led Inter to a memorable 3–2 Champions League away victory over Bayern Munich at the Allianz Arena in the round of 16 after losing the first leg at home. On 2 April 2011, Internazionale lost 3–0 against their fierce rivals Milan, and when Inter, two weeks later, lost 2–0 against relegation battlers Parma, the club's title ambitions had effectively ended. On 6 April, Inter lost 5–2 to Schalke 04 in the quarter-finals of the Champions League. On 29 May 2011, Inter defeated Palermo 3–1 to give Leonardo his first and only trophy as a manager of Inter, the Coppa Italia. He resigned on 18 June.

== Executive career ==
=== Paris Saint-Germain ===
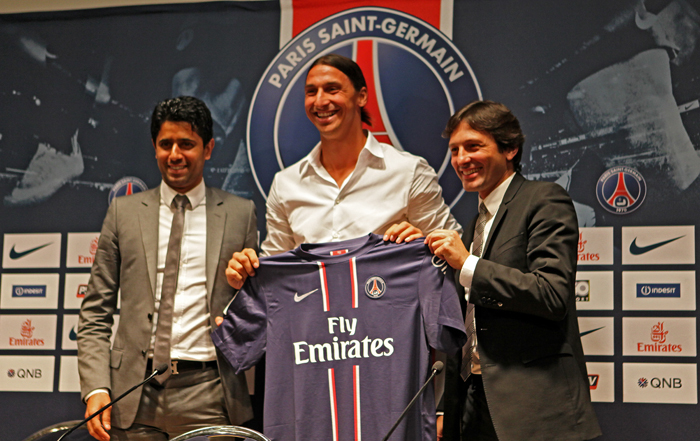
Leonardo with Paris Saint-Germain in 2012

In June 2011, speculation arose about the future of Leonardo at Inter Milan after some media cited about talks between him and the new Qatari owners of Paris Saint-Germain, where Leonardo already spent one season as a player in the 1996–97 season. Following that, Inter Milan president Massimo Moratti began searching a replacement for Leonardo, then hiring former Genoa boss Gian Piero Gasperini as new head coach and releasing Leonardo from his contract thereafter. In July 2011, Leonardo was then introduced as new director of football of PSG, being responsible for the club's major transfer market decisions. His first signings included several high-profile players from Serie A, such as Jérémy Ménez, Mohamed Sissoko, Salvatore Sirigu, Javier Pastore and Thiago Motta, and was the mastermind behind the appointment of his friend Carlo Ancelotti as head coach of PSG.

In May 2013, Leonardo was banned for nine months, after he was accused of pushing a referee at the end of a game against Valenciennes in which Thiago Silva was sent off. The ban was extended to 13 months in July 2013. On 10 July, he tendered his resignation as sporting director and left the French champions at the end of August. His ban was overturned in June 2014 by the Paris Administrative Tribunal, at which point he announced that he would sue the French Football Federation for "professional" and "moral" damages.

=== AC Milan ===
In July 2018, following a change of ownership at Milan and the removal of Marco Fassone and Massimiliano Mirabelli from their respective roles as managing director and director of football, the club's new owners, Elliott Management Corporation, announced the appointment of Leonardo as their new sporting director. In that capacity, he also served as director of football and supervised the captures of Gonzalo Higuaín and Mattia Caldara from Juventus as his first two signings.

In December 2018, he obtained his sporting director diploma through the Coverciano Technical Centre.

=== Return to Paris Saint-Germain ===
On 1 July 2019, it was announced that Leonardo would be the new sporting director of Paris Saint-Germain following his departure from Milan on mutual consent.

In the 2019–20 season, Leonardo made several signings for PSG, including Abdou Diallo, Ander Herrera, Idrissa Gueye, Mauro Icardi, Pablo Sarabia, and Keylor Navas. The club went on to complete a domestic treble and finish runner-up in the UEFA Champions League, a first final for Paris.

In May 2022, Leonardo was sacked by Paris Saint-Germain. Despite his successful attempts at convincing Neymar to stay in Paris, Leonardo is generally viewed by observers as having had a net negative impact on PSG's development during his second spell as sporting director.

=== Italy ===
On 11 July 2026, Leonardo was announced as an advisor for the Italy national football team, working alongside former AC Milan teammate and Italy's current technical director Paolo Maldini. On 27 July, Leonardo and Maldini resigned from their positions following the Italian Football Federation decision to reject the appointment of Andrea Pirlo as the new Italy manager citing links to being brand ambassador to a Russian betting company.

== Career statistics ==
=== Club ===
Appearances and goals by club, season and competition
Club	Season	League			National cup (Note: Includes Copa do Brasil, Copa del Rey, Emperor's Cup, Coupe de France, Coppa Italia)		Continental		Other		Total	
Club	Season	Division	Apps	Goals	Apps	Goals	Apps	Goals	Apps	Goals	Apps	Goals
Flamengo	1987	Série A	18	0	–		–		–		18	0
Flamengo	1988	Série A	18	0	–		3	0	22	0	43	0
Flamengo	1989	Série A	16	0	8	0	1	0	20	1	45	1
Flamengo	1990	Série A	–		4	3	–		21	0	25	3
Flamengo	Total		52	0	12	3	4	0	63	1	131	4
São Paulo	1990	Série A	22	0	–		–		–		22	0
São Paulo	1991	Série A	22	1	–		–		–		22	1
São Paulo	Total		44	1	–		–		–		44	1
Valencia	1991–92	La Liga	36	4	10	3	–		–		46	7
Valencia	1992–93	La Liga	34	3	4	0	2 (Note: Appearances in UEFA Cup)	0	–		40	3
Valencia	Total		70	7	14	3	2	0	–		86	10
São Paulo	1993	Série A	12	3	–		5	2	1	0	18	5
São Paulo	1994	Série A	–		–		1	1	23	9	24	10
São Paulo	Total		12	3	–		6	3	24	9	42	15
Kashima Antlers	1994	J1 League	9	7	1	0	–		–		10	7
Kashima Antlers	1995	J1 League	28	17	3	1	–		–		31	18
Kashima Antlers	1996	J1 League	12	6	10	5	–		–		22	11
Kashima Antlers	Total		49	30	14	6	–		–		63	36
Paris Saint-Germain	1996–97	Division 1	32	7	2	0	7 (Note: Appearances in UEFA Cup Winners' Cup)	3	2 (Note: Appearances in UEFA Super Cup)	0	43	10
Paris Saint-Germain	1997–98	Division 1	2	0	–		1 (Note: Appearance(s) in UEFA Champions League)	0	–		3	0
Paris Saint-Germain	Total		34	7	2	0	8	3	2	0	46	13
Milan	1997–98	Serie A	27	3	5	1	–		–		32	4
Milan	1998–99	Serie A	27	12	2	0	–		–		29	12
Milan	1999–2000	Serie A	20	4	1	1	5	1	0	0	26	6
Milan	2000–01	Serie A	22	3	5	2	5	1	–		32	6
Milan	Total		96	22	13	4	10	2	0	0	119	28
São Paulo	2001	Série A	13	0	–		–		5	0	18	0
Flamengo	2002	Série A	–		–		1	0	6	1	7	1
Milan	2002–03	Serie A	1	0	4	2	–		–		5	2
Career total			371	70	59	18	31	8	100	11	561	107

=== International ===
Appearances and goals by national team and year
National team	Year	Apps	Goals
Brazil	1990	2	0
Brazil	1991	3	0
Brazil	1992	0	0
Brazil	1993	2	0
Brazil	1994	9	0
Brazil	1995	7	2
Brazil	1996	3	0
Brazil	1997	17	4
Brazil	1998	9	0
Brazil	1999	2	1
Brazil	2000	0	0
Brazil	2001	2	0
Total	56		7

== Managerial statistics ==
As of 30 May 2011

Team	From	To	Competition	Record							
Team	From	To	Competition	G	W	D	L	Win %	GF	GA	GD
Milan	1 June 2009	16 May 2010	Serie A	38	20	10	8	52.63	60	39	+21
Milan	1 June 2009	16 May 2010	Coppa Italia	2	1	0	1	50.00	2	2	0
Milan	1 June 2009	16 May 2010	Europe	8	2	3	3	25.00	10	14	–4
Milan	1 June 2009	16 May 2010	Total	48	23	13	12	47.92	72	55	+17
Internazionale	29 December 2010	1 July 2011	Serie A	23	17	2	4	73.91	49	18	+31
Internazionale	29 December 2010	1 July 2011	Coppa Italia	5	3	2	0	60.00	8	4	+4
Internazionale	29 December 2010	1 July 2011	Europe	4	1	0	3	25.00	6	10	–4
Internazionale	29 December 2010	1 July 2011	Total	32	21	4	7	65.63	63	32	+31
Career totals			League	61	37	12	12	60.66	109	57	+52
Career totals			Cup	7	4	2	1	57.14	10	6	+4
Career totals			Europe	12	3	3	6	25.00	16	24	–8
Career totals			Total	80	44	17	19	55.00	135	87	+48

== Honours ==
=== Player ===
Flamengo

- Campeonato Brasileiro Série A: 1987
- Copa do Brasil: 1990

São Paulo

- Intercontinental Cup: 1993
- Recopa Sudamericana: 1993, 1994
- Supercopa Sudamericana: 1993

Kashima Antlers

- J1 League: 1996

AC Milan

- Serie A: 1998–99
- Coppa Italia: 2002–03

Brazil

- FIFA World Cup: 1994
- FIFA Confederations Cup: 1997
- Copa América: 1997

Individual

- Bola de Prata: 1991
- A.C. Milan Hall of Fame
- Golden Foot Award Legends: 2018

=== Manager ===
Inter Milan

- Coppa Italia: 2010–11
