= Márcio Santos =

Brazilian footballer

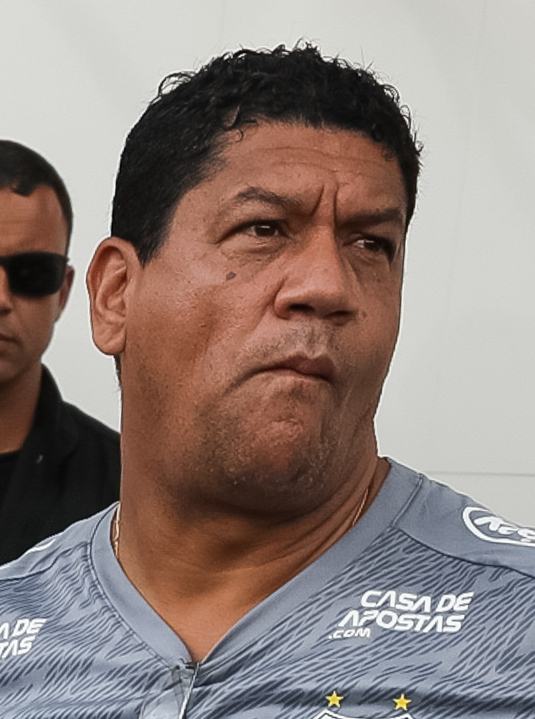
- Márcio Santos in 2020

Personal information
- Full name: Márcio Roberto dos Santos
- Date of birth: 15 September 1969 (age 57)
- Place of birth: São Paulo, Brazil
- Height: 1.87 m (6 ft 2 in)
- Position: Centre-back

Senior career*
Years	Team	Apps	(Gls)
1987–1990	Novorizontino	53	(3)
1990–1991	Internacional	23	(2)
1992	Botafogo	22	(0)
1992–1994	Bordeaux	56	(4)
1994–1995	Fiorentina	32	(2)
1995–1997	Ajax	25	(1)
1997	Atlético Mineiro		
1997–1999	São Paulo	37	(1)
2000	Santos		
2001	Gama		
2001	Shandong Luneng	10	(0)
2002	Etti Jundiaí		
2003	Bolívar	2	(0)
2003	Joinville		
2004–2006	Portuguesa Santista		

International career
1990–1997	Brazil	43	(5)
Medal record
Men's Football
Representing Brazil
FIFA World Cup
Winner	1994
Copa América
Winner	1997 Bolivia
Runner-up	1991 Chile
- * Club domestic league appearances and goals

Márcio Roberto dos Santos (born 15 September 1969), commonly known as Márcio Santos, is a Brazilian former professional footballer who played as a centre-back. Regarded as one of the greatest defenders in the history of Brazilian football, he earned 43 caps and scored five goals for the Brazil national team. A starting member of the side that won the 1994 FIFA World Cup, he appeared in every match of the tournament. He was also part of the Brazilian squad that won the 1997 Copa América.

At club level, He played in Brazil and Europe, representing teams including Internacional, Botafogo, Bordeaux, Fiorentina and Ajax. With Ajax, he won the 1995–96 Eredivisie.

== Club career ==
Santos was born in São Paulo. He began his professional career with Novorizontino in 1987 before joining Internacional in 1990. He won his first professional title, the Campeonato Gaúcho, with Internacional in 1991. Having established himself as one of the leading players in his position in Brazil, he agreed to join French club Bordeaux in 1992. Before completing the move, he spent a brief period on loan at Botafogo, taking part in the club's runner-up campaign in the 1992 Campeonato Brasileiro Série A.

Santos remained with Bordeaux until 1994, playing alongside Zinedine Zidane. Following Brazil's victory at the 1994 FIFA World Cup, he spent one season with Fiorentina before joining Ajax, where he won the 1995–96 Eredivisie. His spell with Ajax was his last in European football.

He returned to Brazil with Atlético Mineiro in 1997, but made few appearances before transferring to São Paulo later that year. He remained there until 1999 and won the Campeonato Paulista in 1998. During the final years of his career, he also represented Santos, Gama, Shandong Luneng, Paulista, Bolívar and Joinville, before retiring with Portuguesa Santista in 2006.

== International career ==
At international level, he was a member of the Brazil national team that won the 1994 FIFA World Cup, in which he scored one goal in the group stages, against Cameroon. He missed his penalty in the shootout in the final against Italy, but Brazil went on to win regardless. He was named to the team of the tournament for his performances. He played 43 games for Brazil between 1990 and 1997, scoring five goals. He also took part at two Copa América tournaments, reaching the final in 1991, and winning the tournament in 1997.

== Honours ==
Internacional

- Campeonato Gaúcho: 1991

Ajax

- Eredivisie: 1995–96

São Paulo

- Campeonato Paulista: 1998

Brazil

- FIFA World Cup: 1994
- Copa América: 1997; runner-up: 1991
- Umbro Cup: 1995
- Tournoi de France runner-up: 1997

Individual

- Bola de Prata: 1991
- Placar Team of the Year: 1991
- FIFA World Cup All-Star Team: 1994
- World XI reserve: 2001
