= 1995 Santos FC season =

Santos
1995 season
- President: Samir Jorge Abdul-Hak
- Coach: Joãozinho; Cabralzinho
- Campeonato Brasileiro: Runners-up
- Campeonato Paulista: 5th
- Supercopa Libertadores: First stage
- Copa dos Campeões: Runners-up
- Top goalscorer: League: Giovanni (41); All: Giovanni (17)

The 1995 season was Santos FC's eightieth third season in existence and club's thirty-sixth in the top flight of Brazilian football since Brasileirão era.

== Players ==
=== Squad ===
Note: Flags indicate national team as defined under FIFA eligibility rules; some limited exceptions apply. Players may hold more than one non-FIFA nationality.

No.	Pos.	Nation	Player
—	GK	BRA	Edinho
—	GK	BRA	Gilberto
—	GK	BRA	Robson
—	DF	BRA	Jean
—	DF	BRA	Marcelo Silva
—	DF	BRA	Marcos Adriano
—	DF	BRA	Marcos Paulo
—	DF	BRA	Marquinhos Capixaba
—	DF	BRA	Narciso
—	DF	BRA	Piá Carioca
—	DF	BRA	Ronaldo
—	DF	BRA	Ronaldo Marconato
—	DF	BRA	Marcelo Moura

No.	Pos.	Nation	Player
—	MF	BRA	Batista
—	MF	BRA	Carlinhos
—	MF	BRA	Cerezo
—	MF	BRA	Gallo
—	MF	BRA	Giovanni
—	MF	BRA	Jamelli
—	MF	BRA	Marcelo Passos
—	MF	BRA	Pintado
—	MF	BRA	Robert
—	MF	BRA	Vágner
—	FW	BRA	Camanducaia
—	FW	BRA	Macedo
—	FW	BRA	Whelliton

Source: Acervo Santista

=== Statistics ===
==== Appearances and goals ====
Pos.	Nat	Name	Brasileiro		Paulista		Supercopa		Copa dos Campeões		Total	
Pos.	Nat	Name	Apps	Goals	Apps	Goals	Apps	Goals	Apps	Goals	Apps	Goals
GK	(Brazil)	Edinho	26	0	34	0	2	0	3	0	65	0
GK	(Brazil)	Gilberto	1 (1)	0	0	0	0	0	0	0	2	0
DF	(Brazil)	Jean	13	1	1 (2)	0	2	0	0	0	18	1
DF	(Brazil)	Marcelo Silva	12 (1)	0	1	0	0	0	0	0	14	0
DF	(Brazil)	Marcos Adriano	18	1	0	0	2	0	0	0	20	1
DF	(Brazil)	Marcos Paulo	8 (1)	0	28 (2)	1	0	0	4	0	43	1
DF	(Brazil)	Marquinhos Capixaba	15	0	0	0	2	0	0	0	17	0
DF	(Brazil)	Narciso	22	0	20	0	2	0	1	0	45	0
DF	(Brazil)	Piá Carioca	1	0	3	0	0	0	0 (1)	0	5	0
DF	(Brazil)	Ronaldo	0	0	10 (6)	0	0	0	3	0	19	0
DF	(Brazil)	Ronaldo Marconato	12 (2)	0	0	0	0	0	0	0	14	0
MF	(Brazil)	Batista	0 (3)	0	0	0	0	0	0	0	3	0
MF	(Brazil)	Carlinhos	20 (4)	2	31	2	1	0	4	0	60	4
MF	(Brazil)	Cerezo	3	0	16 (4)	0	0	0	4	0	27	0
MF	(Brazil)	Gallo	24	2	25 (1)	0	1 (1)	0	4	0	56	2
MF	(Brazil)	Giovanni	25	17	28	18	2	2	4	2	59	39
MF	(Brazil)	Jamelli	22	8	33	4	2	1	4	0	61	13
MF	(Brazil)	Marcelo Passos	8 (5)	3	31 (2)	17	0	0	3	1	49	21
MF	(Brazil)	Pintado	9 (3)	1	0	0	1	0	0	0	13	1
MF	(Brazil)	Robert	21 (4)	2	0	0	2	0	0	0	27	2
MF	(Brazil)	Vágner	13 (1)	2	0	0	0	0	0	0	14	2
FW	(Brazil)	Camanducaia	11 (12)	7	3 (26)	2	2	0	0 (1)	0	55	9
FW	(Brazil)	Macedo	6 (10)	2	32	8	0	0	4	0	52	10
FW	(Brazil)	Whelliton	7 (5)	3	0	0	1	0	0	0	13	3
Players who left the club during the season
GK	(Brazil)	Robson	0	0	2 (1)	0	0	0	1	0	4	0
DF	(Brazil)	Camilo	0	0	2	0	0	0	0	0	2	0
DF	(Brazil)	Gustavo Nery	0	0	2	0	0	0	0	0	2	0
DF	(Brazil)	Maurício Copertino	0	0	16 (1)	0	0	0	3	0	20	0
DF	(Brazil)	Marcelo Fernandes	0	0	12 (1)	0	0	0	0	0	13	0
DF	(Brazil)	Marcelo Moura	0	0	18 (2)	1	0	0	0 (2)	0	22	1
DF	(Brazil)	Rogério	0	0	7 (1)	0	0	0	0	0	8	0
DF	(Brazil)	Silva	0	0	27 (2)	0	0	0	1	0	30	0
MF	(Brazil)	Kiko	0	0	1 (1)	0	0	0	0	0	2	0
MF	(Brazil)	Luís Müller	0	0	3 (2)	1	0	0	1	0	6	1
MF	(Brazil)	Marcos Bazílio	0	0	1 (1)	0	0	0	0	0	2	0
MF	(Brazil)	Marquinhos	0	0	1 (5)	0	0	0	0	0	6	0
MF	(Brazil)	Ranielli	0	0	3 (10)	3	0	0	0	0	13	3
FW	(Brazil)	Demétrius	0	0	5 (10)	2	0	0	0	0	15	2

Source: Match reports in Competitive matches

==== Goalscorers ====
Ran	Pos	Nat	Name	Brasileiro	Paulistão	Supercopa	C. Campeões	Total
1	MF	(Brazil)	Giovanni	17	19	2	2	40
2	MF	(Brazil)	Marcelo Passos	3	17	0	1	21
3	MF	(Brazil)	Jamelli	8	3	1	0	12
4	FW	(Brazil)	Macedo	2	8	0	0	10
5	FW	(Brazil)	Camanducaia	7	2	0	0	9
6	MF	(Brazil)	Carlinhos	2	2	0	0	4
7	MF	(Brazil)	Ranielli	0	3	0	0	3
7	FW	(Brazil)	Whelliton	3	0	0	0	3
8	FW	(Brazil)	Demétrius	0	2	0	0	2
8	MF	(Brazil)	Gallo	2	0	0	0	2
8	MF	(Brazil)	Robert	2	0	0	0	2
8	MF	(Brazil)	Vágner	2	0	0	0	2
9	DF	(Brazil)	Jean	1	0	0	0	1
9	MF	(Brazil)	Luís Müller	0	1	0	0	1
9	DF	(Brazil)	Marcelo Moura	0	1	0	0	1
9	DF	(Brazil)	Marcos Adriano	1	0	0	0	1
9	DF	(Brazil)	Marcos Paulo	0	1	0	0	1
9	MF	(Brazil)	Pintado	1	0	0	0	1

Source: Match reports in Competitive matches

== Transfers ==
=== In ===
Pos.	Name	Moving from	Source	Notes
DF	(Brazil) Marcelo Moura	(Portugal) Leixões		
MF	(Brazil) Jamelli	São Paulo		On loan
GK	(Brazil) Nando	Youth system		Promoted
DF	(Brazil) Jean	Youth system		Promoted
LB	(Brazil) Gustavo Nery	Youth system		Promoted
MF	(Brazil) Marcos Bazílio	Youth system		Promoted
MF	(Brazil) Kiko	Youth system		Promoted
FW	(Brazil) Camanducaia	Youth system		Promoted
DF	(Brazil) Camilo	Atlético Paranaense		Loan return
MF	(Brazil) Batista	Anápolis		
MF	(Brazil) Luís Müller	Remo		
LB	(Brazil) Piá Carioca	(Portugal) União da Madeira		Loan return
RB	(Brazil) Marcelo Silva	Remo		On loan
RB	(Brazil) Marquinhos Capixaba	Ferroviária		
DF	(Brazil) Ronaldo Marconato	Ferroviária		
MF	(Brazil) Pintado	(Mexico) Cruz Azul		On loan
MF	(Brazil) Robert	Rio Branco		
FW	(Brazil) Whelliton	Anápolis		Loan return
LB	(Brazil) Marcos Adriano	Flamengo		On loan
MF	(Brazil) Vágner	União São João		On loan
MF	(Zimbabwe) Kennedy	(South Africa) Jomo Cosmos		
MF	(South Africa) Arthur	(South Africa) Jomo Cosmos		

=== Out ===
Pos.	Name	Moving to	Source	Notes
MF	(Brazil) Neto	Matsubara		On loan
FW	(Brazil) Paulinho Kobayashi	Free agent		
FW	(Brazil) Guga	Botafogo		
RB	(Brazil) Índio	Palmeiras		
MF	(Brazil) Sérgio Manoel	Botafogo		On loan
DF	(Brazil) Rocha	Guarani		Loan Return
MF	(Brazil) Mundinho	Tanabi		Loan Return
MF	(Brazil) Luciano Nunes	Internacional		Loan Return
DF	(Brazil) Nenê	Free agent		
FW	(Brazil) Moysés	Free agent		
DF	(Brazil) Camilo	Atlético Paranaense		On loan
MF	(Brazil) Marcelinho Paraíba	Paraguaçuense		Loan return
MF	(Brazil) Serginho Fraldinha	São José		On loan
MF	(Brazil) Dinho	Grêmio		
DF	(Brazil) Júnior	Cruzeiro		
MF	(Brazil) Cuca	Juventude		
MF	(Brazil) Zé Renato	Bahia		On loan
FW	(Brazil) Neizinho	Bahia		On loan
FW	(Brazil) Neizinho	Paulista		On loan
MF	(Brazil) Zé Renato	Anápolis		On loan
MF	(Brazil) Sérgio Santos	Ceará		On loan
DF	(Brazil) Rogério	Ceará		On loan
FW	(Brazil) Marquinhos	Ceará		On loan
LB	(Brazil) Gustavo Nery	Ceará		On loan
MF	(Brazil) Luís Müller	Bragantino		
LB	(Brazil) Ronaldo	Internacional		On loan
MF	(Brazil) Ranielli	Grêmio		On loan
FW	(Brazil) Demétrius	Remo		On loan
DF	(Brazil) Silva	Remo		On loan
FW	(Brazil) Neizinho	Remo		On loan
MF	(Brazil) Zé Renato	Remo		On loan
GK	(Brazil) Robson	Remo		On loan
DF	(Brazil) Marcelo Fernandes	Remo		On loan

== Friendlies ==
22 January Friendly	Mogi Mirim	1 – 2	Santos	Santa Rita do Passa Quatro
	Celinho 77'	Report	30', 90+5' Marcelo Passos	Stadium: Pereirão; Attendance: 6,000; Referee: José Spironelli

26 January Friendly	Portuguesa Santista	0 – 2	Santos	Santos
		Report	31' Macedo; 79' Demétrius	Stadium: Ulrico Mursa; Referee: Wilson Gauss

31 May Friendly	União Mogi	1 – 1	Santos	Mogi das Cruzes
	Da Silva	Report	12' Jamelli	Stadium: Nogueirão

9 June Friendly	Santos	3 – 5	(Italy) Lazio	Santos
	Jamelli 17'; Marcelo Passos 58'; Demétrius 59'	Report	13', 27' Casiraghi; 29' Signori; 85', 90+1' Fuser	Stadium: Vila Belmiro; Attendance: 2,135; Referee: Osvaldo dos Santos Ramos

15 August Friendly	Inter de Bebedouro	0 – 0	Santos	Bebedouro
		Report		Stadium: Sócrates Stamato; Attendance: 6,638

4 November Friendly	Baré	2 – 3	Santos	Boa Vista
	Marquinhos 67', 75'	Report	14' Giovanni; 73' Arthur; 86' Marquinhos Capixaba	Stadium: Canarinho; Attendance: 6,638; Referee: Marcos Ventura

== Competitions ==
=== Campeonato Brasileiro ===
==== Results summary ====
Overall								Home						Away					
Pld	W	D	L	GF	GA	GD	Pts	W	D	L	GF	GA	GD	W	D	L	GF	GA	GD
27	15	5	7	52	40	+12	50	9	3	2	35	22	+13	6	2	5	17	18	−1

Source: Acervo Santista

==== First stage ====
Pos	Team	Pld	W	D	L	GF	GA	GD	Pts	
1	Fluminense	11	6	3	2	10	4	+6	21	Qualified to semifinals
2	Internacional	11	6	3	2	15	10	+5	21	
3	Santos	11	6	1	4	19	18	+1	19	
4	São Paulo	11	5	4	2	9	5	+4	19	
5	Portuguesa	11	5	3	3	16	14	+2	18	

Source: https://www.rsssfbrasil.com/tablesae/br1995.htm

===== Matches =====
19 August 1	Santos	1 – 1	Goiás	Santos
16:00	Giovanni 54'	Report	59' Márcio Goiano	Stadium: Vila Belmiro; Attendance: 3,730; Referee: Wilson de Souza Mendonça

26 August 2	Santos	3 – 5	Vasco da Gama	Santos
16:00	Pintado 1'; Macedo 12'; Jamelli 77'	Report	42', 49' Leonardo; 72', 89' Valdir; 74' Juninho Pernambucano	Stadium: Vila Belmiro; Attendance: 5,670; Referee: Antonio Pereira da Silva

30 August 3	Fluminense	1 – 0	Santos	Rio de Janeiro
21:00	Leandro Silva 78'	Report		Stadium: Laranjeiras; Attendance: 6,305; Referee: Marco Antônio Cunha

3 September 4	Santos	1 – 0	Criciúma	Santos
16:00	Giovanni 29'	Report		Stadium: Vila Belmiro; Attendance: 1,841; Referee: Carlos Elias Pimentel

7 September 5	Internacional	4 – 2	Santos	Porto Alegre
16:00	Leandro Machado 10', 43', 59'; Caíco 30'	Report	22', 73' (pen.) Giovanni	Stadium: Beira-Rio; Attendance: 43,214; Referee: José Carlos Marcondes

9 September 6	Atlético Mineiro	1 – 2	Santos	Belo Horizonte
16:00	Clayton 50'	Report	21' Jamelli; 27' Camanducaia	Stadium: Mineirão; Attendance: 5,573; Referee: Wilson de Souza Mendonça

16 September 7	Portuguesa	0 – 2	Santos	São Paulo
16:00		Report	16' Robert; 49' Giovanni	Stadium: Canindé; Attendance: 4,977; Referee: João Paulo Araújo

19 September 8	Santos	0 – 1	São Paulo	Santos
20:30		Report	34' Denílson	Stadium: Vila Belmiro; Attendance: 6,290; Referee: Flávio de Carvalho

24 September 9	Santos	3 – 2	União São João	Santos
16:00	Paulo César 10' (o.g.); Whelliton 31', 77'	Report	32' Mauricinho; 45' Nenê	Stadium: Vila Belmiro; Attendance: 2,760; Referee: Edmundo Lima Filho

1 October 10	Santos	3 – 2	Bahia	Santos
16:00	Camanducaia 22'; Jean 56'; Jamelli 67'	Report	12' Raudnei; 34' Cilinho	Stadium: Vila Belmiro; Attendance: 4,237; Referee: Fabiano Gonçalves

8 October 11	Sport Recife	1 – 2	Santos	Recife
16:00	Geraldo 23'	Report	58' Carlinhos; 81' Whelliton	Stadium: Ilha do Retiro; Attendance: 6,305; Referee: Alberto Batista de Carvalho

==== Second stage ====
Pos	Team	Pld	W	D	L	GF	GA	GD	Pts	
1	Santos	12	8	3	1	25	13	+12	27	Qualified to semifinals
2	Atlético Mineiro	12	8	2	2	23	15	+8	26	
3	Goiás	12	6	1	5	17	14	+3	19	
4	Portuguesa	12	4	5	3	12	14	−2	17	
5	São Paulo	12	4	2	6	17	18	−1	14	

Source: https://www.rsssfbrasil.com/tablesae/br1995.htm

===== Matches =====
12 October 1	Santos	4 – 4	Bragantino	Santos
16:00	Jamelli 22', 24', 53'; Giovanni 51' (pen.)	Report	8', 71' Adalberto; 37', 74' Kelly	Stadium: Vila Belmiro; Attendance: 7,212; Referee: João Paulo Araújo

15 October 2	Juventude	1 – 1	Santos	Caxias do Sul
17:00	Andrei 76' (pen.)	Report	44' Camanducaia	Stadium: Alfredo Jaconi; Attendance: 4,588; Referee: Renildo Nunes

19 October 3	Santos	4 – 1	Grêmio	Santos
21:30	Gallo 9'; Giovanni 52', 70', 89'	Report	51' Nildo	Stadium: Vila Belmiro; Attendance: 3,058; Referee: Márcio Rezende de Freitas

22 October 4	Santos	2 – 1	Cruzeiro	Santos
19:00	Jamelli 49'; Giovanni 65' (pen.)	Report	52' Edmundo	Stadium: Vila Belmiro; Attendance: 11,996; Referee: José Carlos Marcondes

29 October 5	Vitória	4 – 0	Santos	Salvador
17:00	Adoilson 42'; Cleisson 62'; Paulinho Kobayashi 69', 84'	Report		Stadium: Barradão; Attendance: 3,712; Referee: Valdomiro Matias Filho

9 November 6	Flamengo	0 – 3	Santos	Rio de Janeiro
21:30		Report	7' Marcos Adriano; 34' Camanducaia; 41' Robert	Stadium: Maracanã; Attendance: 10,533; Referee: Sidrack Marinho

12 November 7	Paraná	0 – 0	Santos	Curitiba
19:00		Report		Stadium: Durival de Brito; Attendance: 8,494; Referee: Carlos Eugênio Simon

19 November 8	Santos	3 – 0	Corinthians	Santos
19:00	Camanducaia 71', 89'; Gallo 72'	Report		Stadium: Vila Belmiro; Attendance: 19,607; Referee: João Paulo Araújo

22 November 9	Palmeiras	0 – 1	Santos	São Paulo
20:30		Report	33' Vágner	Stadium: Pacaembu; Attendance: 28,542; Referee: Dionísio Roberto Domingos

25 November 10	Santos	2 – 1	Paysandu	Santos
16:00	Carlinhos 5'; Giovanni 22'	Report	69' (pen.) Catanha	Stadium: Vila Belmiro; Attendance: 13,496; Referee: Carlos Eugênio Simon

29 November 11	Santos	3 – 1	Botafogo	Santos
20:30	Vágner 23'; Giovanni 35'; Jamelli 54'	Report	61' Dauri	Stadium: Vila Belmiro; Attendance: 20,300; Referee: Wilson de Souza Mendonça

3 December 12	Guarani	0 – 2	Santos	São Paulo
16:00		Report	82' Marcelo Passos; 89' Giovanni	Stadium: Pacaembu; Attendance: 22,524; Referee: Oscar Roberto Godói

==== Semi-final ====
7 December 1st leg	Fluminense	4 – 1	Santos	Rio de Janeiro
21:40	Renato Gaúcho 49'; Ronald 69' (pen.); Leonardo 89'; Cadu 90+1'	Report	21' Giovanni	Stadium: Maracanã; Attendance: 38,678; Referee: Sidrack Marinho

10 December 2nd leg	Santos	5 – 2 (6 – 6 agg.)	Fluminense	São Paulo
19:00	Giovanni 25' (pen.), 29'; Macedo 51'; Camanducaia 61'; Marcelo Passos 83'	Report	52', 85' Rogerinho	Stadium: Pacaembu; Attendance: 28,090; Referee: Sidrack Marinho

==== Final ====
13 December 1st leg	Botafogo	2 – 1	Santos	Rio de Janeiro
21:40	Wilson Gottardo 18'; Túlio 44'	Report	38' Giovanni	Stadium: Maracanã; Attendance: 53,668; Referee: Sidrack Marinho

17 December 2nd leg	Santos	1 – 1 (2 – 3 agg.)	Botafogo	São Paulo
19:00	Marcelo Passos 46'	Report	24' Túlio	Stadium: Pacaembu; Attendance: 28,488; Referee: Márcio Rezende de Freitas

=== Campeonato Paulista ===
==== Results summary ====
Overall								Home						Away					
Pld	W	D	L	GF	GA	GD	Pts	W	D	L	GF	GA	GD	W	D	L	GF	GA	GD
36	14	13	9	59	44	+15	55	11	4	3	38	18	+20	3	9	6	21	26	−5

Source: Acervo Santista

==== First stage ====
Pos	Team	Pld	W	D	L	GF	GA	GD	Pts	Qualification or relegation
1	Portuguesa	30	16	10	4	47	29	+18	58	Qualified
2	São Paulo	30	15	9	6	45	27	+18	54	Qualified
3	Santos	30	13	11	6	49	30	+19	50	Qualified
4	Palmeiras	30	12	9	9	47	30	+17	45	Qualified
5	Guarani	30	12	9	9	40	36	+4	45	Qualified

Updated to match(es) played on 11 June 1995. Source: RSSSF.com
Rules for classification: 1) points; 2) wins; 3) goal difference; 4) number of goals scored.

===== Matches =====
29 January 1	Santos	2 – 0	União São João	Santos
16:00	Marcelo Passos 29', 48'	Report		Stadium: Ulrico Mursa; Attendance: 4,390; Referee: João Paulo Araújo

8 February 2	Santos	3 – 0	América–SP	Santos
16:00	Marcelo Passos 5'; Jamelli 58'; Giovanni 85'	Report		Stadium: Ulrico Mursa; Attendance: 2,993; Referee: José Aparecido de Oliveira

12 February 3	XV de Piracicaba	0 – 0	Santos	Piracicaba
17:00		Report		Stadium: Barão da Serra Negra; Attendance: 19,626; Referee: Edmundo Lima Filho

19 February 4	Palmeiras	2 – 2	Santos	São Paulo
16:00	Rivaldo 4'; Alex Alves 49'	Report	6' Giovanni; 34' (pen.) Marcelo Passos	Stadium: Palestra Itália; Attendance: 5,376; Referee: Oscar Roberto de Godói

23 February 5	Santos	3 – 2	Bragantino	São Paulo
21:30	Macedo 7', 69'; Marcelo Passos 33' (pen.)	Report	15' Maurinho; 60' Ciro	Stadium: Morumbi; Attendance: 2,404; Referee: José Mocellin

5 March 6	Juventus	2 – 2	Santos	Santo André
16:00	Nildo 50'; Fernando Diniz 84'	Report	9' Macedo; 32' Marcelo Passos	Stadium: Bruno José Daniel; Attendance: 11,648; Referee: Dalmo Bozzano

12 March 7	Guarani	1 – 3	Santos	Campinas
16:00	Djalminha 58' (pen.)	Report	41' (pen.) Marcelo Passos; 49', 82' Giovanni	Stadium: Brinco de Ouro; Attendance: 8,351; Referee: José Aparecido de Oliveira

15 March 8	Corinthians	0 – 0	Santos	São Paulo
20:35		Report		Stadium: Pacaembu; Attendance: 24,337; Referee: João Paulo Araújo

18 March 9	Santos	1 – 1	Portuguesa	Santos
16:00	Ranielli 76'	Report	65' Flávio Guarujá	Stadium: Vila Belmiro; Attendance: 16,003; Referee: Márcio Rezende de Freitas

20 March 10	Santos	4 – 1	Ponte Preta	Santos
21:00	Macedo 43'; Giovanni 74', 85', 89' (pen.)	Report	81' Dionísio	Stadium: Vila Belmiro; Attendance: 13,118; Referee: Dagoberto Teixeira

23 March 11	Rio Branco	4 – 2	Santos	Americana
20:30	Marcelo Carioca 6', 45+1' (pen.), 66'; Flávio Costa 59'	Report	17' Giovanni; 89' Camanducaia	Stadium: Décio Vitta; Attendance: 12,275; Referee: Dionísio Roberto Domingos

26 March 12	Novorizontino	2 – 1	Santos	Novo Horizonte
16:00	Paulinho 18'; Élder 28'	Report	71' Ranielli	Stadium: Jorge Ismael de Biasi; Attendance: 1,947; Referee: Dalmo Bozzano

2 April 13	Santos	3 – 1	Araçatuba	Santos
16:00	Macedo 60'; Camanducaia 64'; Giovanni 90'	Report	54' Garrinchinha	Stadium: Vila Belmiro; Attendance: 7,991; Referee: Antonio de Pádua Sales

5 April 14	Ferroviária	0 – 1	Santos	Araraquara
20:30		Report	62' Giovanni	Stadium: Fonte Luminosa; Attendance: 5,784; Referee: Carlos Elias Pimentel

9 April 15	Santos	1 – 1	São Paulo	Santos
16:00	Marcelo Passos 70' (pen.)	Report	10' Bentinho	Stadium: Vila Belmiro; Attendance: 20,000; Referee: José Mocellin

15 April 16	Santos	1 – 1	Novorizontino	Santos
20:00	Giovanni 45'	Report	58' Vital	Stadium: Vila Belmiro; Attendance: 9,680; Referee: Alfredo dos Santos Loebeling

19 April 17	Bragantino	1 – 1	Santos	Bragança Paulista
20:30	Juarez 87'	Report	13' Jamelli	Stadium: Marcelo Stéfani; Attendance: 2,564; Referee: Silas Santana

22 April 18	Portuguesa	1 – 2	Santos	São Paulo
16:00	Betinho 11'	Report	32' (pen.) Marcelo Passos; 41' Marcos Paulo	Stadium: Canindé; Attendance: 12,721; Referee: Oscar Roberto de Godói

27 April 19	Santos	1 – 2	Guarani	Santos
21:40	Ranielli 7'	Report	62' Cláudio; 90+2' Leto	Stadium: Vila Belmiro; Attendance: 6,218; Referee: Dionísio Roberto Domingos

30 April 20	Santos	3 – 1	Corinthians	Santos
18:00	Marcelo Passos 31', 45'; Macedo 80'	Report	72' Célio Silva	Stadium: Vila Belmiro; Attendance: 18,719; Referee: Dalmo Bozzano

7 May 21	América–SP	1 – 1	Santos	São José do Rio Preto
16:00	Édson Pezinho 73'	Report	19' Giovanni	Stadium: Mário Alves Mendonça; Attendance: 6,289; Referee: Roberto Perazzi

11 May 22	Santos	2 – 0	Juventus	Santos
20:30	Jamelli 21'; Marcelo Passos 41' (pen.)	Report		Stadium: Vila Belmiro; Attendance: 3,663; Referee: Cláudio Cerdeira

14 May 23	Santos	3 – 1	Palmeiras	Santos
18:00	Marcelo Passos 50', 52', 57' (pen.)	Report	62' Alex Alves	Stadium: Vila Belmiro; Attendance: 9,779; Referee: José Mocellin

18 May 24	Ponte Preta	2 – 1	Santos	Campinas
21:40	Gaúcho 19'; Carlos André 51'	Report	12' Marcelo Moura	Stadium: Moisés Lucarelli; Attendance: 1,955; Referee: Oscar Roberto de Godói

21 May 25	Santos	1 – 0	Ferroviária	Santos
16:00	Giovanni 84'	Report		Stadium: Vila Belmiro; Attendance: 6,935; Referee: João Paulo Araújo

24 May 26	Santos	0 – 1	Rio Branco	Santos
20:30		Report	63' Marcelinho Paraíba	Stadium: Vila Belmiro; Attendance: 5,786; Referee: José Mocellin

28 May 27	União São João	1 – 1	Santos	Araras
16:00	Catanha 49'	Report	22' Giovanni	Stadium: Hermínio Ometto; Referee: Dionísio Roberto Domingos

4 June 28	São Paulo	0 – 0	Santos	São Paulo
16:00		Report		Stadium: Pacaembu; Attendance: 17,820; Referee: Flávio de Carvalho

7 June 29	Araçatuba	1 – 0	Santos	Araçatuba
20:30	Tuta 38'	Report		Stadium: Adhemar de Barros; Attendance: 11,000; Referee: Edilson Pereira de Carvalho

11 June 30	Santos	4 – 0	XV de Piracicaba	Santos
15:30	Marcelo Passos 37' (pen.); Demétrius 53', 63'; Carlinhos 69'	Report		Stadium: Vila Belmiro; Attendance: 2,101; Referee: Alfredo dos Santos Loebeling

==== Final stage ====
Pos	Team	Pld	W	D	L	GF	GA	GD	Pts	Qualification or relegation
1	Corinthians	6	5	1	0	13	5	+8	16	Qualified
2	Portuguesa	6	3	0	3	8	5	+3	10 (Note: Portuguesa won 1 extra point for winning the first stage)	
3	Santos	6	1	2	3	10	14	−4	5	
4	União São João	6	1	1	4	5	12	−7	4	

Updated to match(es) played on 23 July 1995. Source: RSSSF.com
Rules for classification: 1) points; 2) Best season record

===== Matches =====
18 June 1	Portuguesa	3 – 1	Santos	São Paulo
16:00	Flávio Guarujá 19', 21'; Jorge Andrade 71'	Report	90' Giovanni	Stadium: Canindé; Attendance: 16,349; Referee: Pierluigi Pairetto

25 June 2	Santos	2 – 2	Corinthians	Ribeirão Preto
16:00	Macedo 11'; Giovanni 51'	Report	2' Marcelinho Carioca; 24' Viola	Stadium: Santa Cruz; Referee: Cláudio Cerdeira

1 July 3	Santos	3 – 2	União São João	Santos
16:00	Carlinhos 2'; Giovanni 12', 68'	Report	73' Alexandre; 88' Amarildo	Stadium: Ulrico Mursa; Attendance: 4,339; Referee: João Paulo Araújo

9 July 4	Santos	1 – 2	Portuguesa	Santos
16:00	Macedo 22'	Report	14' Edinho; 83' Caio	Stadium: Vila Belmiro; Attendance: 12,689; Referee: Léo Feldman

15 July 5	União São João	1 – 1	Santos	Araras
16:00	Amarildo 70'	Report	80' Luís Müller	Stadium: Hermínio Ometto; Referee: Flávio de Carvalho

23 July 6	Corinthians	4 – 2	Santos	Limeira
11:00	Marques 25', 72'; Marcelinho Carioca 30'; Tupãzinho 76'	Report	52' Giovanni; 81' Marcelo Passos	Stadium: Major Levy Sobrinho; Attendance: 19,387; Referee: José Mocellin

=== Copa dos Campeões Mundiais ===
==== First stage ====
Pos	Team	Pld	W	D	L	GF	GA	GD	Pts	Qualification or relegation
1	Santos	3	2	1	0	3	1	+2	7	Qualified to Final
2	São Paulo	3	2	0	1	4	3	+1	6	Qualified to Final
3	Grêmio	3	1	1	1	2	1	+1	4	
4	Flamengo	3	0	0	3	1	5	−4	0	

Updated to match(es) played on 19 July 1995. Source: RSSSF.com
Rules for classification: 1) points; 2) wins; 3) goal difference; 4) number of goals scored.

===== Matches =====
5 July 1	São Paulo	1 – 2	Santos	Uberlândia
20:45	Toninho Cerezo 76'	Report	15', 35' Giovanni	Stadium: Parque do Sabiá; Referee: Marco Antônio Cunha

12 July 2	Santos	1 – 0	Flamengo	Brasília
20:45	Marcelo Passos 21'	Report		Stadium: Mané Garrincha; Attendance: 12,581; Referee: Etevaldo Batista

18 July 3	Grêmio	0 – 0	Santos	Brasília
20:45		Report		Stadium: Mané Garrincha; Attendance: 3,461; Referee: Jorge Paulo

==== Final ====
8 July	Santos	0 – 0 (3–4 p)	São Paulo	Uberlândia
20:45		Report		Stadium: Parque do Sabiá; Referee: Márcio Rezende de Freitas
	Penalties
	Giovanni (penalty missed); Jamelli (penalty scored); Gallo (penalty scored); Carlinhos (penalty scored); Marcelo Passos (penalty missed)		(penalty scored) Bentinho; (penalty missed) Bordon; (penalty scored) Aílton; (penalty scored) Sierra; (penalty scored) Alemão

=== Supercopa Libertadores ===
==== Round of 16 ====
13 September First leg	Independiente (Argentina)	1 – 1	(Brazil) Santos	Buenos Aires
20:40	Álvez 90+5'	Report	20' Jamelli	Stadium: La Doble Visera; Referee: Julio Matto (Uruguay)

4 October Second leg	Santos (Brazil)	2 – 2 (3–3 agg.) (2–3 p)	(Argentina) Independiente	Santos
21:30	Giovanni 7', 88'	Report	32' Mazzoni; 59' Domizzi	Stadium: Vila Belmiro; Attendance: 9,058; Referee: Epifanio González (Paraguay)
	Penalties
	Marquinhos Capixaba (penalty missed); Robert (penalty missed); Gallo (penalty scored); Giovanni (penalty scored); Jamelli (penalty missed)		(penalty scored) Burruchaga; (penalty missed) Garnero; (penalty scored) Serrizuela; (penalty scored) Arzeno; (penalty missed) Cagna
