= 1994 Santos FC season =

Santos
1994 season
- President: Miguel Kodja Neto; Samir Jorge Abdul-Hak
- Manager: Pepe; Serginho Chulapa; Joãozinho
- Campeonato Brasileiro: 9th
- Campeonato Paulista: 4th
- Supercopa Libertadores: First stage
- Copa Bandeirantes: Runners-up
- Top goalscorer: League: Macedo (8); All: Macedo (16)

The 1994 season was Santos FC's eighty-second season in existence and club's thirty-fifth in the top flight of Brazilian football since Brasileirão era.

== Players ==
=== Squad ===
Note: Flags indicate national team as defined under FIFA eligibility rules; some limited exceptions apply. Players may hold more than one non-FIFA nationality.

No.	Pos.	Nation	Player
—	GK	BRA	Edinho
—	GK	BRA	Gilberto
—	GK	BRA	Robson
—	DF	BRA	Índio
—	DF	BRA	Júnior
—	DF	BRA	Marcelo Fernandes
—	DF	BRA	Marcos Paulo
—	DF	BRA	Maurício Copertino
—	DF	BRA	Narciso
—	DF	BRA	Nenê
—	DF	BRA	Silva
—	MF	BRA	Carlinhos
—	MF	BRA	Cerezo

No.	Pos.	Nation	Player
—	MF	BRA	Dinho
—	MF	BRA	Gallo
—	MF	BRA	Giovanni
—	MF	BRA	Marcelinho Paraíba
—	MF	BRA	Marcelo Passos
—	MF	BRA	Neto
—	MF	BRA	Ranielli
—	MF	BRA	Sérgio Santos
—	FW	BRA	Demétrius
—	FW	BRA	Guga
—	FW	BRA	Macedo
—	FW	BRA	Paulinho Kobayashi
—	FW	BRA	Serginho Fraldinha

Source: Acervo Santista

=== Statistics ===
==== Appearances and goals ====
Pos.	Nat	Name	Brasileiro		Paulista		Supercopa		Copa Bandeirantes		Total	
Pos.	Nat	Name	Apps	Goals	Apps	Goals	Apps	Goals	Apps	Goals	Apps	Goals
GK	(Brazil)	Edinho	16	0	25	0	2	0	8	0	51	0
GK	(Brazil)	Gilberto	9	0	5	0	0	0	0	0	14	0
DF	(Brazil)	Índio	24	1	26	1	2	0	7	0	35	2
DF	(Brazil)	Júnior	18	0	26	0	2	0	8	0	54	0
DF	(Brazil)	Luciano	0	0	8 (1)	0	0	0	0	0	9	0
DF	(Brazil)	Marcelo Fernandes	13 (1)	2	14 (2)	0	2	0	0 (2)	0	34	2
DF	(Brazil)	Maurício Copertino	7	0	17	1	0	0	7	0	31	1
DF	(Brazil)	Marcos Paulo	0	0	1	0	0	0	0	0	1	0
DF	(Brazil)	Narciso	10 (1)	0	0	0	0	0	1 (1)	0	13	0
DF	(Brazil)	Nenê	1 (1)	0	0	0	0	0	0	0	2	0
DF	(Brazil)	Rocha	2 (1)	0	0	0	0	0	0	0	3	0
DF	(Brazil)	Silva	23	1	13 (3)	0	2	0	8	0	49	1
MF	(Brazil)	Carlinhos	7 (3)	0	6 (3)	1	0	0	3	0	22	1
MF	(Brazil)	Cerezo	8 (8)	0	11	1	0 (2)	0	7	3	36	4
MF	(Brazil)	Dinho	20	0	23	2	2	0	2	0	47	2
MF	(Brazil)	Gallo	22	1	26	2	2	0	7	0	57	3
MF	(Brazil)	Giovanni	7 (4)	1	0	0	0	0	0	0	11	1
MF	(Brazil)	Luciano Nunes	0	0	4 (3)	0	0	0	0	0	7	0
MF	(Brazil)	Marcelinho Paraíba	1 (6)	0	0	0	0	0	5 (2)	1	14	1
MF	(Brazil)	Neto	15 (1)	3	0	0	1 (1)	0	0	0	18	3
MF	(Brazil)	Ranielli	6 (1)	3	22 (2)	3	1	0	0	0	32	6
MF	(Brazil)	Serginho Fraldinha	1 (6)	0	2 (4)	0	0 (1)	0	7 (1)	1	22	1
MF	(Brazil)	Sérgio Santos	0 (1)	0	8 (4)	0	0	0	2	0	15	0
FW	(Brazil)	Camanducaia	0	0	0	0	0	0	0 (1)	0	1	0
FW	(Brazil)	Demétrius	1 (4)	0	5 (4)	4	0	0	7	1	21	5
FW	(Brazil)	Guga	22 (1)	7	21 (1)	8	2	0	0	0	47	15
FW	(Brazil)	Macedo	24	8	27	7	2	0	1 (3)	1	57	16
FW	(Brazil)	Moysés	0 (1)	1	0	0	0	0	0	0	1	1
FW	(Brazil)	Paulinho Kobayashi	18 (4)	7	20 (2)	5	2	0	5	1	51	13
Players who left the club during the season
DF	(Brazil)	Piá Carioca	0	0	10	0	0	0	0	0	10	0
MF	(Brazil)	Cassinho	0	0	2	0	0	0	0	0	2	0
MF	(Brazil)	Marcelo Passos	0	0	0 (4)	0	0	0	0	0	4	0
MF	(Brazil)	Zé Renato	0	0	3 (11)	0	0	0	0	0	14	0
FW	(Brazil)	Neizinho	0	0	5 (9)	1	0	0	3 (5)	3	22	4

Source: Match reports in Competitive matches

==== Goalscorers ====
Ran	Pos	Nat	Name	Brasileiro	Paulistão	Supercopa	Copa Bandeirantes	Total
1	FW	(Brazil)	Macedo	8	7	0	1	16
2	FW	(Brazil)	Guga	7	8	0	0	15
3	FW	(Brazil)	Paulinho Kobayashi	7	5	0	1	13
4	MF	(Brazil)	Ranielli	3	3	0	0	6
5	FW	(Brazil)	Demétrius	0	4	0	1	5
6	MF	(Brazil)	Cerezo	0	1	0	3	4
6	FW	(Brazil)	Neizinho	0	1	0	3	4
7	MF	(Brazil)	Gallo	1	2	0	0	3
7	MF	(Brazil)	Neto	3	0	0	0	3
8	MF	(Brazil)	Dinho	0	2	0	0	2
8	DF	(Brazil)	Índio	1	1	0	0	2
8	DF	(Brazil)	Marcelo Fernandes	2	0	0	0	2
9	MF	(Brazil)	Carlinhos	0	1	0	0	1
9	MF	(Brazil)	Giovanni	1	0	0	0	1
9	MF	(Brazil)	Marcelinho Paraíba	0	0	0	1	1
9	DF	(Brazil)	Maurício Copertino	0	1	0	0	1
9	FW	(Brazil)	Moysés	1	0	0	0	1
9	MF	(Brazil)	Serginho Fraldinha	0	0	0	1	1
9	DF	(Brazil)	Silva	1	0	0	0	1

Source: Match reports in Competitive matches

== Transfers ==
=== In ===
Pos.	Name	Moving from	Source	Notes
FW	(Brazil) Loca	Goiás		Loan return
MF	(Brazil) Marquinhos	Jabaquara		Loan return
FW	(Brazil) Toninho Marques	TBD		Loan return
MF	(Brazil) Carlinhos	Jabaquara		Loan return
MF	(Brazil) Cassinho	TBD		Loan return
MF	(Brazil) Essinho	Goiás		Loan return
MF	(Brazil) Gláucio	TBD		Loan return
MF	(Brazil) Cerezo	Jabaquara		Loan return
DF	(Brazil) França	CRB		Loan return
FW	(Brazil) Moysés	TBD		Loan return
MF	(Brazil) Léo	Goiatuba		Loan return
DF	(Brazil) Luiz Carlos	Goiás		Loan return
MF	(Brazil) Serginho Fraldinha	Confiança		Loan return
MF	(Brazil) Sérgio Santos	TBD		Loan return
FW	(Brazil) Whelliton	Goiatuba		Loan return
FW	(Brazil) Paulinho Kobayashi	Portuguesa		
GK	(Brazil) Edinho	Portuguesa Santista		Loan return
RB	(Brazil) Luciano	Inter de Limeira		On loan
FW	(Brazil) Macedo	São Paulo		On loan
GK	(Brazil) Gilberto	São Paulo		
LB	(Brazil) Piá Carioca	Flamengo		
MF	(Brazil) Dinho	São Paulo		
MF	(Brazil) Luciano Nunes	Internacional		On loan
FW	(Brazil) Demétrius	Botafogo–SP		
MF	(Brazil) Marcelo Passos	Paraguaçuense		Loan return
DF	(Brazil) Nenê	(Portugal) Portimonense		
MF	(Brazil) Marcelinho Paraíba	Corinthians–AL		On loan
DF	(Brazil) Narciso	Corinthians–AL		On loan
LB	(Brazil) Rocha	Guarani		On loan
MF	(Brazil) Carlinhos	Paulista		Loan return
MF	(Brazil) Neto	Atlético Mineiro		
MF	(Brazil) Mundinho	Tanabi		On loan
FW	(Brazil) Moysés	Rio Preto		Loan return
MF	(Brazil) Giovanni	Tuna Luso		
RB	(Brazil) Ronaldo	Ituano		

=== Out ===
Pos.	Name	Moving to	Source	Notes
LB	(Brazil) Flavinho	Free agent		
FW	(Brazil) Almir	(Japan) Bellmare Hiratsuka		
MF	(Brazil) Darci	Rio Branco–SP		Loan return
GK	(Brazil) Velloso	Palmeiras		Loan return
MF	(Brazil) Márcio Griggio	Juventus		Loan return
FW	(Brazil) Neto	Juventus		Loan return
DF	(Brazil) Vilson	Grêmio		Loan return
GK	(Brazil) Maurício	Novorizontino		Loan return
GK	(Brazil) Gomes	Grêmio		Loan return
DF	(Brazil) Ricardo Rocha	Free agent		
DF	(Brazil) Lula	Free agent		
LB	(Brazil) Eduardo	Free agent		
FW	(Brazil) Toni	Free agent		
MF	(Brazil) Axel	São Paulo		
RB	(Brazil) Dinho	Inter de Limeira		On loan
DF	(Brazil) Luiz Carlos	Novorizontino		
MF	(Brazil) Cuca	Portuguesa		On loan
MF	(Brazil) Sérgio Manoel	Botafogo		
MF	(Brazil) Marcelo Passos	Paraguaçuense		On loan
FW	(Brazil) Moysés	Rio Preto		On loan
MF	(Brazil) Zé Renato	Joinville		On loan
LB	(Brazil) Piá Carioca	(Portugal) União da Madeira		
MF	(Brazil) Marcelo Passos	Londrina		On loan
RB	(Brazil) Dinho	Atlético Mineiro		
FW	(Brazil) Cilinho	Free agent		
FW	(Brazil) Loca	Free agent		
MF	(Brazil) Essinho	Free agent		
FW	(Brazil) Toninho Marques	Tuna Luso		
MF	(Brazil) Marquinhos	Tuna Luso		
MF	(Brazil) Cassinho	Tuna Luso		
DF	(Brazil) Camilo	União São João		On loan
MF	(Brazil) Cuca	Remo		On loan
FW	(Brazil) Neizinho	União São João		On loan

== Friendlies ==
23 February Friendly	Bellmare Hiratsuka (Japan)	0 – 1	Santos	Yokohama, Japan
		Report	57' Guga	Stadium: Mitsuzawa; Attendance: 12,000; Referee: Kaiti Sunakawa

26 February Friendly	Cerezo Osaka (Japan)	1 – 2	Santos	Naruto, Japan
	Yamaguchi 76'	Report	43' Marcelo Passos; 46' Luciano Nunes	Stadium: Tokushima Naruto; Attendance: 10,000; Referee: Shinishiro Obata

2 March Friendly	Kashiwa Reysol (Japan)	0 – 0	Santos	Fukuoka, Japan
		Report		Stadium: Hakatanomori

19 May Friendly	Hortolândia	1 – 7	Santos	Hortolândia
	Goal	Report	(?) Guga (?) Paulinho Kobayashi (?) Demétrius (?) Serginho Fraldinha	Stadium: Tico Breda

21 May Brazil-Italy International Tournament	Palmeiras	1 – 0	Santos	São Paulo
	Maurílio 40'	Report		Stadium: Palestra Itália; Attendance: 4,593; Referee: Oscar Roberto de Godói

22 May Brazil-Italy International Tournament	Santos	3 – 1	(Italy) Parma	São Paulo
	Guga 12', 32', 56' (pen.)	Report	75' Crippa	Stadium: Palestra Itália; Attendance: 6,335; Referee: Dionísio Roberto Domingos

25 May Friendly	Araçatuba	1 – 4	Santos	Araçatuba
	Sérgio 30'	Report	26' (pen.), 69' (pen.) Guga; 45+1' Neizinho; 80' Ranielli	Stadium: Adhemar de Barros; Referee: João Massoneto

9 June Friendly	Guarani	1 – 3	Santos	Campinas
	Amoroso 48'	Report	61' Paulinho Kobayashi; 70' Marcelo Fernandes; 81' Demétrius	Stadium: Brinco de Ouro da Princesa; Attendance: 313; Referee: José Leonardo Epíscopo Rosa

26 June Friendly	São Joaquim da Barra	1 – 1	Santos	São Joaquim da Barra
	Goal	Report	Marcelo Passos	Stadium: Municipal Stadium

14 December Friendly	Guadalajara (Mexico)	1 – 3	Santos	Oakland, United States
	Espinoza	Report	Demétrius; Dinho; Giovanni	Stadium: Coliseum; Attendance: 10,000

== Competitions ==
=== Campeonato Brasileiro ===
==== Results summary ====
Overall								Home						Away					
Pld	W	D	L	GF	GA	GD	Pts	W	D	L	GF	GA	GD	W	D	L	GF	GA	GD
25	13	5	7	36	22	+14	44	10	1	2	26	8	+18	3	4	5	10	14	−4

==== First stage ====
Pos	Team	Pld	W	D	L	GF	GA	GD	Pts	
1	Guarani	10	7	1	2	17	7	+10	15	Qualified to second stage, earned a bonus point
2	Santos	10	6	2	2	16	8	+8	14	Qualified to second stage
3	Vasco da Gama	10	4	3	3	12	9	+3	11	Qualified to second stage
4	Bahia	10	4	3	3	11	13	−2	11	Qualified to second stage
5	Remo	10	2	1	7	5	15	−10	5	Relegation league

Source: https://www.rsssfbrasil.com/tablesae/br1994.htm

===== Matches =====
14 August 1	Santos	1 – 0	Remo	Santos
16:00	Paulinho Kobayashi 59'	Report		Stadium: Vila Belmiro; Attendance: 9,937; Referee: Léo Feldman

17 August 2	Cruzeiro	0 – 0	Santos	Belo Horizonte
21:00		Report		Stadium: Mineirão; Attendance: 4,759; Referee: Cláudio Vinícius Cerdeira

20 August 3	Santos	2 – 0	Vasco da Gama	Santos
16:00	Guga 54' (pen.); Gallo 89'	Report		Stadium: Vila Belmiro; Attendance: 13,440; Referee: José Mocellin

24 August 4	Santos	3 – 0	Bahia	Santos
21:00	Macedo 19'; Paulinho Kobayashi 71'; Silva 86'	Report		Stadium: Vila Belmiro; Attendance: 4,305; Referee: Carlos Elias Pimentel

27 August 5	Guarani	4 – 0	Santos	Campinas
16:00	Luizão 20', 48'; Amoroso 64', 73'	Report		Stadium: Brinco de Ouro da Princesa; Attendance: 8,059; Referee: Sidrack Marinho

31 August 6	Bahia	2 – 1	Santos	Salvador
20:00	Marcelo Ramos 39'; Raudnei 71'	Report	21' Neto	Stadium: Fonte Nova; Attendance: 9,008; Referee: Cláudio Vinícius Cerdeira

4 September 7	Santos	1 – 0	Guarani	Santos
16:00	Paulinho Kobayashi 72'	Report		Stadium: Vila Belmiro; Attendance: 4,810; Referee: Ivo Tadeu Scatolla

11 September 8	Vasco da Gama	0 – 0	Santos	Rio de Janeiro
17:00		Report		Stadium: São Januário; Attendance: 5,391; Referee: Wilson de Souza Mendonça

18 September 9	Santos	4 – 1	Cruzeiro	Santos
16:00	Ranielli 26'; Macedo 43', 68'; Guga 71' (pen.)	Report	46' Cleisson	Stadium: Vila Belmiro; Attendance: 8,441; Referee: Luis Cunha Martins

25 September 10	Remo	1 – 4	Santos	Belém
17:00	Chicão 7'	Report	27' Macedo; 52' Ranielli; 60' Paulinho Kobayashi; 61' Guga	Stadium: Mangueirão; Attendance: 2,068; Referee: Wilson de Souza Mendonça

==== Second stage ====
===== First round =====
Pos	Team	Pld	W	D	L	GF	GA	GD	Pts
3	São Paulo	7	3	3	1	14	12	+2	9
4	Bahia	7	2	4	1	9	8	+1	8
5	Santos	7	2	2	3	10	11	−1	6
6	Botafogo	7	2	1	4	7	12	−5	6
7	Flamengo	7	1	2	4	3	7	−4	4

Source: https://www.rsssfbrasil.com/tablesae/br1994.htm

====== Matches ======
2 October 1	Flamengo	1 – 1	Santos	Rio de Janeiro
17:00	Nélio 29'	Report	21' Índio	Stadium: Maracanã; Attendance: 12,471; Referee: José Mocellin

8 October 2	Santos	2 – 3	São Paulo	Santos
16:00	Cafu 6' (o.g.); Moysés 78'	Report	45' Júnior Baiano; 45+1' André Luiz; 49' Aílton	Stadium: Vila Belmiro; Attendance: 20,119; Referee: Oscar Roberto de Godói

16 October 3	Santos	2 – 2	Sport Recife	Santos
17:00	Guga 30'; Paulinho Kobayashi 43'	Report	57' Sandro; 73' Fabio	Stadium: Vila Belmiro; Attendance: 8,030; Referee: Carlos Elias Pimentel

19 October 4	Palmeiras	2 – 0	Santos	São Paulo
21:00	Zinho 36'; Evair 45+1' (pen.)	Report		Stadium: Palestra Itália; Attendance: 20,611; Referee: Dionísio Roberto Domingos

22 October 5	Santos	2 – 0	Botafogo	Santos
16:00	Guga 19'; Marcelo Fernandes 66'	Report		Stadium: Vila Belmiro; Attendance: 3,211; Referee: Márcio Rezende de Freitas

26 October 6	Bahia	3 – 2	Santos	Salvador
21:00	Ueslei 15', 38', 46'	Report	10' Guga; 42' Paulinho Kobayashi	Stadium: Fonte Nova; Attendance: 13,587; Referee: Francisco Dacildo Mourão

30 October 7	Santos	1 – 0	Paraná	Santos
17:00	Giovanni 11'	Report		Stadium: Vila Belmiro; Attendance: 2,478; Referee: Luciano Augusto Teotônio de Almeida

===== Second round =====
Pos	Team	Pld	W	D	L	GF	GA	GD	Pts	
1	Botafogo	8	5	3	0	13	5	+8	13	Qualified to quarterfinals
2	Santos	8	5	1	2	10	3	+7	11	
3	São Paulo	8	5	0	3	14	9	+5	10	
4	Bahia	8	3	4	1	10	6	+4	10	
5	Paraná	8	3	2	3	9	9	0	8	

Source: https://www.rsssfbrasil.com/tablesae/br1994.htm

====== Matches ======
2 November 1	Paysandu	0 – 1	Santos	Belém
17:00		Report	85' Marcelo Fernandes	Stadium: Mangueirão; Attendance: 14,160; Referee: Marco Antônio Collares Brasil

5 November 2	Santos	3 – 0	Vasco da Gama	Santos
16:00	Neto 1'; Macedo 34'; Paulinho Kobayashi 73'	Report		Stadium: Vila Belmiro; Attendance: 9,465; Referee: Ivo Tadeu Scatolla

9 November 3	Santos	1 – 0	Internacional	Santos
21:00	Macedo 40'	Report		Stadium: Vila Belmiro; Attendance: 7,819; Referee: Márcio Rezende de Freitas

12 November 4	Portuguesa	0 – 0	Santos	São Paulo
17:00		Report		Stadium: Canindé; Attendance: 16,544; Referee: Alfredo dos Santos Loebeling

16 November 5	Santos	1 – 2	Corinthians	São Paulo
21:00	Neto 58'	Report	6' Marques; 37' Tupãzinho	Stadium: Pacaembu; Attendance: 13,087; Referee: Antônio Cláudio Perin

20 November 6	Fluminense	0 – 1	Santos	Rio de Janeiro
17:00		Report	11' Macedo	Stadium: Maracanã; Attendance: 7,779; Referee: Lincoln Afonso Borjaille Bicalho

23 November 7	Grêmio	1 – 0	Santos	Porto Alegre
21:00	Jaques (53f)	Report		Stadium: Olímpico; Attendance: 1,912; Referee: Luciano Augusto Teotônio de Almeida

26 November 8	Santos	3 – 0	Guarani	Santos
16:00	Macedo 17'; Ranielli 24'; Guga 83' (pen.)	Report		Stadium: Vila Belmiro; Attendance: 5,416; Referee: Dalmo Bozzano

=== Campeonato Paulista ===
==== Results summary ====
Overall								Home						Away					
Pld	W	D	L	GF	GA	GAv	Pts	W	D	L	GF	GA	Pts	W	D	L	GF	GA	Pts
30	11	12	7	37	34	1.088	34	9	5	1	26	15	23	2	7	6	11	19	11

==== League table ====
Pos	Team	Pld	W	D	L	GF	GA	GD	Pts
2	São Paulo	30	16	9	5	66	38	+28	41
3	Corinthians	30	16	9	5	59	34	+25	41
4	Santos	30	11	12	7	37	34	+3	34
5	América	30	12	6	12	32	32	0	30
6	Novorizontino	30	8	13	9	35	37	−2	29

Updated to match(es) played on 15 May 1994. Source: RSSSF.com
Rules for classification: 1) points; 2) wins; 3) goal difference; 4) number of goals scored.

===== Matches =====
26 January 1	Santos	2 – 2	Guarani	Santos
20:30	Gallo 24' (pen.); Neizinho 53'	Report	30' Djalminha; 41' Clóvis	Stadium: Vila Belmiro; Attendance: 11,898; Referee: José Mocellin

30 January 2	São Paulo	2 – 0	Santos	São Paulo
16:00	Juninho Paulista 38'; Valdeir 83'	Report		Stadium: Morumbi; Attendance: 14,402; Referee: Oscar Roberto de Godói

2 February 3	Santos	1 – 1	Ituano	Santos
20:30	Paulinho Kobayashi 31'	Report	50' Romeu	Stadium: Vila Belmiro; Attendance: 7,147; Referee: Joaquim Carlos Caetano

6 February 4	Santo André	1 – 0	Santos	Santo André
16:00	Claudinho 52'	Report		Stadium: Bruno José Daniel; Attendance: 13,842; Referee: João Paulo Araújo

9 February 5	Ponte Preta	0 – 0	Santos	Campinas
20:30		Report		Stadium: Moisés Lucarelli; Attendance: 4,157; Referee: Silas Santana

12 February 6	Santos	1 – 0	Mogi Mirim	Santos
16:00	Guga 62'	Report		Stadium: Vila Belmiro; Attendance: 4,748; Referee: Antônio de Pádua Sales

17 February 7	Rio Branco	2 – 0	Santos	Americana
21:00	Rudinei 42'; Aritana 64'	Report		Stadium: Décio Vitta; Attendance: 3,968; Referee: Dagoberto Teixeira

20 February 8	Corinthians	4 – 0	Santos	São Paulo
16:00	Viola 37', 60', 79'; Tupãzinho 49'	Report		Stadium: Pacaembu; Attendance: 31,188; Referee: Renato Marsiglia

4 March 9	Santos	1 – 1	Ferroviária	Santos
20:30	Carlinhos 65'	Report	78' Estrela	Stadium: Vila Belmiro; Attendance: 2,949; Referee: Roberto Perazi

6 March 10	Santos	1 – 4	Palmeiras	São Paulo
19:30	Macedo 50'	Report	34' César Sampaio; 52' (o.g.) Marcelo Fernandes; 75' Evair; 78' Cléber	Stadium: Pacaembu; Attendance: 23,528; Referee: João Paulo Araújo

8 March 11	União São João	1 – 1	Santos	Araras
20:30	Cleomar 55'	Report	4' Cerezo	Stadium: Hermínio Ometto; Attendance: 2,721; Referee: Antônio de Pádua Sales

10 March 12	Santos	3 – 1	América–SP	Santos
15:30	Macedo 13', 52'; Ranielli 27'	Report	73' Coutinho	Stadium: Vila Belmiro; Attendance: 3,385; Referee: Marcos Spironelli

12 March 13	Santos	2 – 1	Portuguesa	Santos
16:00	Macedo 54'; Guga 90'	Report	53' Simão	Stadium: Vila Belmiro; Attendance: 5,175; Referee: Roberto Perassi

15 March 14	Santos	1 – 0	Bragantino	Santos
20:30	Gallo 23'	Report		Stadium: Vila Belmiro; Attendance: 4,580; Referee: José Mocellin

17 March 15	Novorizontino	1 – 0	Santos	Novo Horizonte
20:30	Kel 73'	Report		Stadium: Jorge Ismael de Biasi; Attendance: 3,016; Referee: Flávio de Carvalho

20 March 16	Bragantino	1 – 1	Santos	Bragança Paulista
16:00	Ciro 41'	Report	45' (pen.) Guga	Stadium: Marcelo Stéfani; Attendance: 3,297; Referee: Dagoberto Teixeira

24 March 17	Santos	2 – 0	Santo André	Santos
20:30	Paulinho Kobayashi 78'; Ranielli 80'	Report		Stadium: Vila Belmiro; Attendance: 4,297; Referee: Edmundo de Lima Filho

27 March 18	Santos	3 – 0	Rio Branco	Santos
16:00	Paulinho Kobayashi 28'; Demétrius 74', 79'	Report		Stadium: Vila Belmiro; Attendance: 6,934; Referee: Dionísio Roberto Domingos

31 March 19	Ituano	0 – 2	Santos	Itu
21:10		Report	15' Macedo; 51' Demétrius	Stadium: Novelli Júnior; Attendance: 3,569; Referee: João Paulo Oliveira

3 April 20	Palmeiras	1 – 1	Santos	São Paulo
16:00	Evair 10' (pen.)	Report	23' Índio	Stadium: Pacaembu; Attendance: 27,796; Referee: Oscar Roberto de Godói

10 April 21	Santos	0 – 0	São Paulo	São Paulo
17:00		Report		Stadium: Morumbi; Attendance: 33,344; Referee: João Paulo Araújo

13 April 22	Santos	2 – 1	Ponte Preta	Santos
20:30	Guga 65', 76'	Report	82' Arnaldo Lopes	Stadium: Vila Belmiro; Attendance: 6,605; Referee: José Leonardo Epíscopo Rosa

17 April 23	Guarani	1 – 1	Santos	Campinas
16:00	Fernando 48'	Report	90' (o.g.) Da Silva	Stadium: Brinco de Ouro; Attendance: 8,094; Referee: Dionísio Roberto Domingos

24 April 24	Santos	4 – 3	Corinthians	São Paulo
16:00	Guga 23', 41', 86'; Dinho 26' (pen.)	Report	8' (pen.) Marcelinho Carioca; 21', 88' Casagrande	Stadium: Morumbi; Attendance: 26,271; Referee: Oscar Roberto de Godói

28 April 25	Ferroviária	2 – 1	Santos	Araraquara
20:10	Silvinho 61'; Marquinhos Capixaba 79'	Report	30' Paulinho Kobayashi	Stadium: Fonte Luminosa; Attendance: 3,493; Referee: Silas Santana

1 May 26	Santos	2 – 0	Novorizontino	Santos
16:00	Macedo 22'; Paulinho Kobayashi 62'	Report		Stadium: Vila Belmiro; Attendance: 5,775; Referee: Ulisses Tavares da Silva Filho

5 May 27	América–SP	1 – 2	Santos	São José do Rio Preto
20:30	Edinan 22'	Report	26' Maurício Copertino; 67' Macedo	Stadium: Mário Alves Mendonça; Attendance: 6,493; Referee: João Paulo Araújo

8 May 28	Mogi Mirim	1 – 1	Santos	Mogi Mirim
16:00	Lélis 69'	Report	4' Ranielli	Stadium: Wilson de Barros; Attendance: 11,617; Referee: Flávio de Carvalho

11 May 29	Santos	1 – 1	União São João	Santos
20:30	Dinho 45+3'	Report	50' Israel	Stadium: Vila Belmiro; Attendance: 2,893; Referee: João Paulo Araújo

15 May 30	Portuguesa	1 – 1	Santos	São Paulo
16:00	Sinval 16'	Report	90' Demétrius	Stadium: Canindé; Attendance: 3,974; Referee: Ulisses Tavares da Silva Filho

=== Copa Bandeirantes ===
==== First stage ====
Pos	Team	Pld	W	D	L	GF	GA	GD	Pts	Qualification or relegation
1	Santos	6	4	1	1	8	3	+5	9	Qualified to Final
2	América–SP	6	2	3	1	4	2	+2	7	
3	Palmeiras	6	1	3	2	2	3	−1	6 (Note: Palmeiras won 1 extra point for winning the 1994 Campeonato Paulista)	
4	Nacional–SP	6	0	3	3	1	7	−6	3	

Updated to match(es) played on 6 August 1994. Source:
Rules for classification: 1) points; 2) wins; 3) goal difference; 4) number of goals scored.

===== Matches =====
20 July 1	América–SP	2 – 0	Santos	São José do Rio Preto
20:40	Floriano 44'; Cléber 90+4'	Report		Stadium: Mário Alves Mendonça; Attendance: 1,374; Referee: João Paulo Araújo

22 July 2	Palmeiras	0 – 0	Santos	Santo André
20:40		Report		Stadium: Bruno José Daniel; Referee: Dionísio Roberto Domingos

24 July 3	Santos	4 – 0	Nacional–SP	Santos
15:00	Neizinho 30', 82'; Cerezo 36'; Marcelinho Paraíba 80'	Report		Stadium: Vila Belmiro; Attendance: 985; Referee: José Aparecido de Oliveira

30 July 4	Santos	1 – 0	América–SP	Santos
16:00	Serginho Fraldinha 55'	Report		Stadium: Vila Belmiro; Attendance: 1,726; Referee: Marcos Fabio Spironelli

2 August 5	Nacional–SP	0 – 1	Santos	São Caetano do Sul
21:40		Report	33' Paulinho Kobayashi	Stadium: Anacleto Campanella; Attendance: 630; Referee: Edmundo de Lima Filho

6 August 6	Santos	2 – 1	Palmeiras	Santos
16:00	Cerezo 52'; Demétrius 58'	Report	67' Macula	Stadium: Vila Belmiro; Attendance: 8,061; Referee: Oscar Roberto de Godói

==== Final ====
9 August First leg	Santos	3 – 6	Corinthians	São Paulo
16:00	Cerezo 26'; Macedo 56'; Neizinho 76'	Report	11' Wilson Mano; 65' Tupãzinho; 71' Marcelinho Carioca; 82', 90+1' Viola; 86' Marques	Stadium: Morumbi; Attendance: 9,558; Referee: Edmundo de Lima Filho

11 August Second leg	Corinthians	1 – 1 (7 – 4 agg.)	Santos	São Paulo
16:00	Gralak 21'	Report	8' Demétrius	Stadium: Morumbi; Attendance: 21,696; Referee: Cláudio Vinícius Cerdeira

=== Supercopa Libertadores ===
==== Round of 16 ====
8 September First leg	Santos (Brazil)	1 – 0	(Argentina) Independiente	Santos
21:30	Rotchen 33' (o.g.)	Report		Stadium: Vila Belmiro; Attendance: 3,679; Referee: Alfredo Rodas (Ecuador)

22 September Second leg	Independiente (Argentina)	4 – 0 (4–1 agg.)	(Brazil) Santos	Buenos Aires
21:30	Arzeno 21'; Usuriaga 27'; Rambert 66'; Pérez 90+2' (pen.)	Report		Stadium: La Doble Visera; Referee: Julio Matto (Uruguay)
