= Pintado (footballer) =

Brazilian footballer & manager (born 1965)

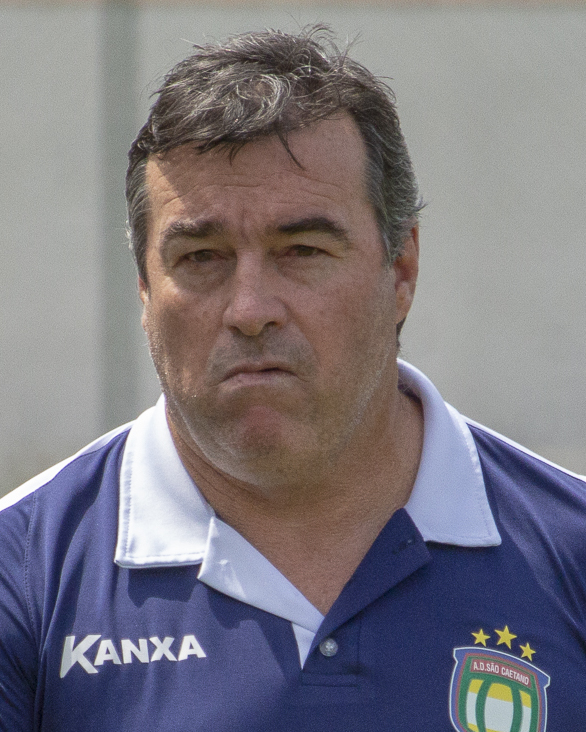
- Pintado as head coach of São Caetano in 2018

Personal information
- Full name: Luís Carlos de Oliveira Preto
- Date of birth: 17 September 1965 (age 61)
- Place of birth: Braganca Paulista, Brazil
- Height: 1.80 m (5 ft 11 in)
- Position: Defensive midfielder

Senior career*
Years	Team	Apps	(Gls)
1983	Bragantino		
1984–1993	São Paulo	78	(2)
1987	→ Taubaté (loan)		
1987–1991	→ Bragantino (loan)		
1993–1997	Cruz Azul		
1995	→ Santos (loan)	13	(1)
1997	América Mineiro	28	(1)
1998	Atlético Mineiro	7	(1)
1998	Cerezo Osaka	21	(4)
1999	Portuguesa		
2000	América Mineiro	33	(1)
2001	Democrata-GV		
2001	Inter de Limeira		
2001	Bragantino		
2002	União São João	20	(3)
2003	Pelotas	2	(0)
2003	Santa Cruz		
2003	Brasiliense		

Managerial career
- 2004: Inter de Limeira
- 2004–2005: América Mineiro
- 2005: Atlético Sorocaba
- 2006: Inter de Limeira
- 2006: Rio Branco-SP
- 2006: Taubaté
- 2007: Rio Branco-MG
- 2007: Noroeste
- 2007: Paraná
- 2007: Emirates
- 2008: Ituano
- 2008: São Caetano
- 2008: Nàutico
- 2008–2009: Figueirense
- 2009: Mirassol
- 2009: Ponte Preta
- 2010: Mirassol
- 2010: León
- 2011: Santo André
- 2011–2012: Linense
- 2012: Guaratinguetá
- 2012: CRB
- 2013: Penapolense
- 2013: América de Natal
- 2013: São Caetano
- 2014–2015: Cruz Azul (assistant)
- 2015–2016: Guarani
- 2016–2017: São Paulo (assistant)
- 2016: São Paulo (interim)
- 2017: São Paulo (interim)
- 2018–2019: São Caetano
- 2019: Figueirense
- 2020: Água Santa
- 2020–2021: Juventude
- 2021: Ferroviária
- 2021: Goiás
- 2021: Chapecoense
- 2022: Cuiabá
- 2023: Inter de Limeira
- 2023: Juventude
- 2023: Ponte Preta
- 2024: Portuguesa
- 2024: Guarani
- 2025: Água Santa
- 2025: Figueirense
- 2026: Velo Clube
- * Club domestic league appearances and goals

Luís Carlos de Oliveira Preto (born 17 September 1965), commonly known as Pintado, is a Brazilian football coach and former player who played as a defensive midfielder.

== Playing career ==
Born in Bragança Paulista, São Paulo, Pintado started his career with hometown side Bragantino in 1983. He left the club in the following year after having unpaid wages, and spent a 45-day trial at Palmeiras before signing for São Paulo.

After featuring rarely, Pintado was loaned to Taubaté before returning to Braga in 1987, also on loan. Mainly a right back, he played in all positions in the defense before being converted into a defensive midfielder by manager Carlos Alberto Parreira.

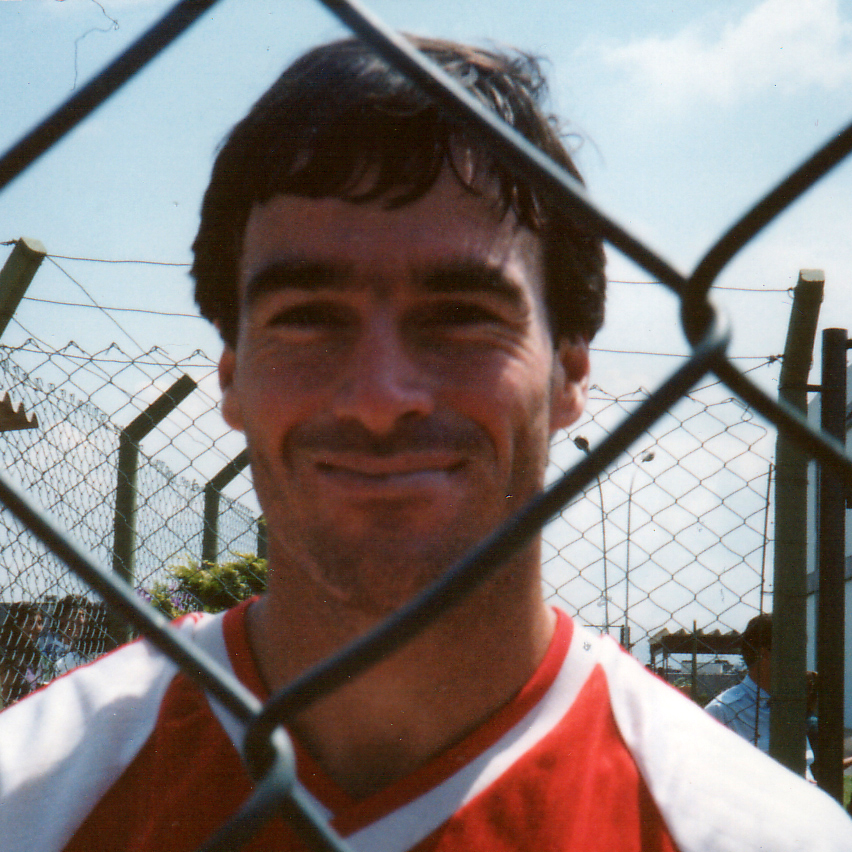
Pintado as a Cruz Azul player in 1993

Upon returning, Pintado featured more regularly before moving abroad in 1993, with Mexican side Cruz Azul. He also had a short loan stint at Santos in 1995, but left Los Celestes permanently in 1997.

After a period with Minas Gerais sides América Mineiro and Atlético Mineiro, Pintado moved to Japan in 1998 with Cerezo Osaka. He would return to his home country in the following year, and subsequently represented Portuguesa, América Mineiro, Democrata de Governador Valadares, Internacional de Limeira, Bragantino, União São João, Pelotas, Santa Cruz and Brasiliense.

== Managerial career ==
Shortly after retiring, Pintado started working as a manager at one of his former clubs, Inter de Limeira, where he won the Campeonato Paulista Série A2. After returning to former team América in July of that year, he was unable to avoid his side's relegation from the Série B.

Pintado subsequently worked at Atlético Sorocaba, Inter de Limeira, Rio Branco-SP, Taubaté, Rio Branco de Andradas and Noroeste before taking over Paraná on 18 May 2007. He left the club in July, after only nine matches after accepting an offer from an Emirati club.

Pintado took over Ituano in January 2008, but resigned on 24 February. The following day, he was appointed in charge of São Caetano, but was dismissed on 9 July. Six days later, he was named at the helm of Náutico, but was sacked on 8 August; he ended the year at Figueirense, after being named manager of the side in November.

Sacked by Figueira on 2 March 2009, Pintado had a short stint at Mirassol before taking over Ponte Preta on 25 May. He was relieved from his duties on 29 August, and returned to Mirassol on 28 October for the ensuing campaign.

Pintado resigned from Mirassol on 13 March 2010, and moved abroad with Club León on 1 September. He returned to Brazil on 1 December to join Santo André, but left his post the following 20 February. Two days later, he took over Linense.

Pintado left Linense on 16 April 2012, and was named manager of Guaratinguetá on 18 June. He opted to leave the club on 15 August, and was appointed in charge of CRB four days later; on 1 October, he was sacked.

Pintado worked at Penapolense, América de Natal and São Caetano during the 2013 season, before returning to Mexico to work as an assistant manager at Cruz Azul.

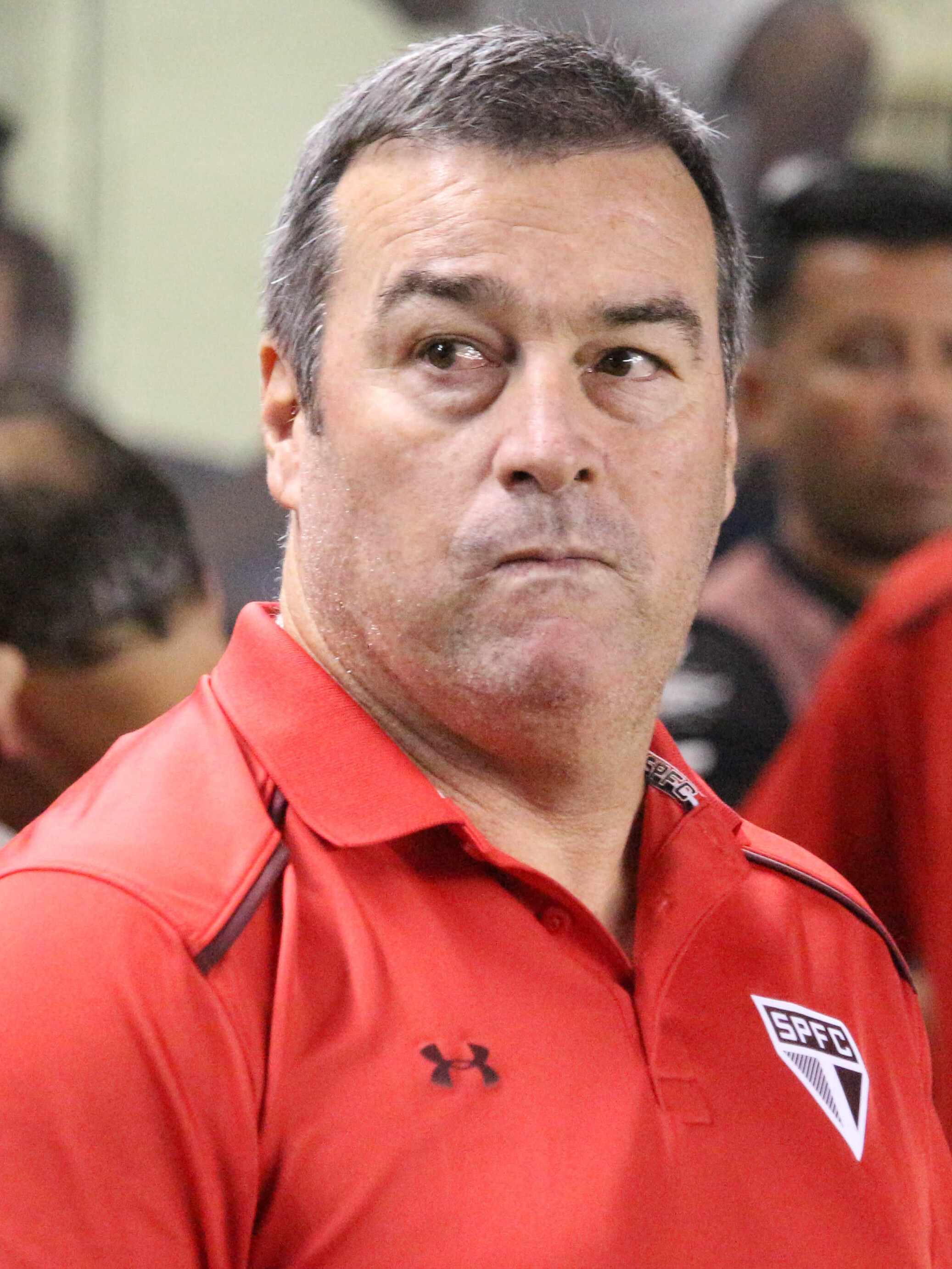
Pintado as an interim head coach of São Paulo in 2017

On 23 August 2015, Pintado was appointed Guarani manager, but left the following 3 April to return to former club São Paulo, as an assistant. While at the latter club, he was an interim manager on two occasions.

Pintado returned to managerial duties on 6 February 2018, after taking over São Caetano for a third spell. He was dismissed by the club after suffering relegation in the 2019 Campeonato Paulista, and returned to Figueirense on 14 October; he led the side to a nine-match unbeaten run, which helped them to avoid relegation, but still left on 6 December.

On 31 January 2020, Pintado was named manager of Água Santa, but left on 27 March to take over Juventude. The following 1 February, after achieving top tier promotion, he left the club and was named in charge of Ferroviária.

Pintado resigned from AFE on 26 April 2021, and took over Goiás three days later. He left the club on 18 July, and was appointed in charge of Chapecoense on 4 August.

On 26 October 2021, with Chape in the last position, Pintado left on a mutual agreement. The following 4 January, he took over Cuiabá also in the top tier.

Pintado won the Campeonato Matogrossense with Cuiabá, but was sacked on 12 May 2022. He then worked at his first club Inter de Limeira during the 2023 Campeonato Paulista, before returning to Juventude on 11 March of that year.

Pintado was sacked by Ju on 8 May 2023, after one win in five matches into the 2023 Série B. On 24 July, he returned to Ponte Preta after nearly 14 years, but was dismissed on 2 October.

On 9 February 2024, Pintado was announced as head coach of Portuguesa, replacing Dado Cavalcanti. He left after the end of the 2024 Campeonato Paulista, and returned to Guarani on 19 June.

On 26 July 2024, after 13 winless matches, Pintado was dismissed by Bugre. On 5 February of the following year, he was named in charge of Água Santa, but was unable to prevent relegation from the 2025 Campeonato Paulista.

On 29 April 2025, Pintado returned to Figueirense for his third spell as a head coach. He was dismissed on 11 August, after a five-match winless run.

== Career statistics ==
Club	Season	League			State League		Cup		Continental		Other		Total	
Club	Season	Division	Apps	Goals	Apps	Goals	Apps	Goals	Apps	Goals	Apps	Goals	Apps	Goals
São Paulo	1985	Série A	0	0	2	0	—		—		—		2	0
São Paulo	1986	Série A	0	0	0	0	—		—		—		0	0
São Paulo	1991	Série A	1	0	0	0	—		—		—		1	0
São Paulo	1992	Série A	16	0	29	0	—		14 (Note: Appearance(s) in Copa Libertadores)	0	4 (Note: Three appearances in Supercopa Libertadores, one appearance in Intercontinental Cup)	0	63	0
São Paulo	1993	Série A	0	0	30	2	0	0	8	0	—		38	2
São Paulo	Total		17	0	61	2	0	0	22	0	4	0	96	2
Santos	1995	Série A	13	1	0	0	0	0	—		1 (Note: Appearance(s) in Supercopa Libertadores)	0	14	1
América Mineiro	1997	Série B	18	1	10	0	—		—		—		28	1
Atlético Mineiro	1998	Série A	0	0	7	1	5	0	—		—		12	1
Cerezo Osaka	1998	J.League	21	4	—		1	0	—		0	0	22	4
América Mineiro	2000	Série A	21	0	12	1	2	0	—		11 (Note: Nine appearances and two goals in Copa Sul-Minas, two appearances in Copa dos Campeões)	2	46	3
União São João	2002	Série B	0	0	20	3	—		—		—		20	3
Pelotas	2002	Gaúcho	—		2	0	—		—		—		2	0
Career total			90	6	112	7	8	0	22	0	16	2	248	15

== Managerial statistics ==
As of 14 April 2026

Managerial record by team and tenure
Team	Nat.	From	To	Record								Ref
Team	Nat.	From	To	G	W	D	L	GF	GA	GD	Win %	Ref
Inter de Limeira	(Brazil)	25 January 2004	30 May 2004	26	14	6	6	41	28	+13	53.85	
América Mineiro	(Brazil)	21 July 2004	13 December 2004	9	2	3	4	12	15	−3	22.22	
Inter de Limeira	(Brazil)	4 February 2006	23 April 2006	18	7	5	6	26	31	−5	38.89	
Rio Branco-SP	(Brazil)	30 May 2006	5 September 2006	10	1	1	8	6	22	−16	10.00	
Taubaté	(Brazil)	1 October 2006	5 February 2007	5	0	2	3	6	9	−3	0.00	
Rio Branco de Andradas	(Brazil)	8 February 2007	14 March 2007	4	2	1	1	4	3	+1	50.00	
Noroeste	(Brazil)	April 2007	17 May 2007	5	3	2	0	9	5	+4	60.00	
Paraná	(Brazil)	18 May 2007	16 July 2007	9	2	4	3	12	13	−1	22.22	
Ituano	(Brazil)	7 January 2008	24 February 2008	11	4	1	6	13	21	−8	36.36	
São Caetano	(Brazil)	26 February 2008	9 July 2008	17	5	4	8	15	21	−6	29.41	
Náutico	(Brazil)	16 July 2008	8 August 2008	6	0	1	5	5	13	−8	0.00	
Figueirense	(Brazil)	17 November 2008	2 March 2009	13	6	2	5	22	21	+1	46.15	
Mirassol	(Brazil)	9 March 2009	26 April 2009	7	4	2	1	15	12	+3	57.14	
Ponte Preta	(Brazil)	25 May 2009	30 August 2009	17	7	6	4	32	23	+9	41.18	
Mirassol	(Brazil)	28 October 2009	13 March 2010	16	4	7	5	20	24	−4	25.00	
León	(Mexico)	10 September 2010	1 December 2010	16	6	3	7	26	25	+1	37.50	
Santo André	(Brazil)	1 December 2010	20 February 2011	9	0	6	3	8	15	−7	0.00	
Linense	(Brazil)	22 February 2011	16 April 2012	26	11	5	10	40	43	−3	42.31	
Guaratinguetá	(Brazil)	18 June 2012	15 August 2012	11	1	3	7	6	17	−11	9.09	
CRB	(Brazil)	19 August 2012	1 October 2012	9	2	1	6	10	17	−7	22.22	
Penapolense	(Brazil)	24 February 2013	21 May 2013	14	5	4	5	21	16	+5	35.71	
América de Natal	(Brazil)	28 August 2013	5 October 2013	10	3	3	4	10	14	−4	30.00	
São Caetano	(Brazil)	9 October 2013	30 November 2013	10	2	3	5	8	15	−7	20.00	
Guarani	(Brazil)	23 August 2015	3 April 2016	24	11	7	6	29	21	+8	45.83	
São Paulo (interim)	(Brazil)	23 November 2016	6 December 2016	2	2	0	0	7	1	+6	100.00	
São Paulo (interim)	(Brazil)	3 July 2017	9 July 2017	1	0	0	1	2	3	−1	0.00	
São Caetano	(Brazil)	6 February 2018	29 March 2019	38	12	15	11	36	37	−1	31.58	
Figueirense	(Brazil)	14 October 2019	6 December 2019	9	2	7	0	10	7	+3	22.22	
Água Santa	(Brazil)	31 January 2020	27 March 2020	5	1	3	1	4	7	−3	20.00	
Juventude	(Brazil)	27 March 2020	1 February 2021	46	20	11	15	60	49	+11	43.48	
Ferroviária	(Brazil)	1 February 2021	26 April 2021	8	3	2	3	11	9	+2	37.50	
Goiás	(Brazil)	29 April 2021	19 July 2021	12	5	5	2	11	5	+6	41.67	
Chapecoense	(Brazil)	4 August 2021	26 October 2021	13	1	5	7	12	23	−11	7.69	
Cuiabá	(Brazil)	4 February 2022	12 May 2022	21	11	5	5	37	18	+19	52.38	
Inter de Limeira	(Brazil)	4 October 2022	6 March 2023	12	3	2	7	4	18	−14	25.00	
Juventude	(Brazil)	11 March 2023	8 May 2023	5	1	0	4	3	6	−3	20.00	
Ponte Preta	(Brazil)	24 July 2023	2 October 2023	11	2	5	4	7	12	−5	18.18	
Portuguesa	(Brazil)	9 February 2024	2 April 2024	8	2	2	4	4	9	−5	25.00	
Guarani	(Brazil)	19 June 2024	26 July 2024	6	0	3	3	5	8	−3	0.00	
Água Santa	(Brazil)	5 February 2025	24 February 2025	4	0	2	2	2	7	−5	0.00	
Figueirense	(Brazil)	29 April 2025	11 August 2025	12	3	7	2	11	8	+3	25.00	
Velo Clube	(Brazil)	28 August 2025	9 March 2026	10	1	4	5	3	14	−11	10.00	
Career total				528	171	162	195	629	689	−60	32.39	—

== Honours ==
=== Player ===
São Paulo

- Campeonato Paulista: 1985, 1990 e 1992
- Copa Libertadores: 1992, 1993
- Intercontinental Cup: 1992

Cruz Azul

- Copa México: 1996–97

América Mineiro

- Copa Sul-Minas: 2000

=== Manager ===
Inter de Limeira

- Campeonato Paulista Série A2: 2004

Cuiabá

- Campeonato Mato-Grossense: 2022
