= Marcos Adriano =

Brazilian footballer (born 1969)

Personal information
- Full name: Marcos Adriano Gonçalves de Barros
- Date of birth: 30 July 1969 (age 57)
- Place of birth: Palmeira dos Índios, Brazil
- Height: 1.73 m (5 ft 8 in)
- Position: Left back

Senior career*
| Years | Team | Apps | (Gls) |
| 1989–1990 | Fernandópolis | | |
| 1990–1992 | Operário-MS | | |
| 1992–1993 | São Paulo | 47 | (0) |
| 1993–1995 | Flamengo | 100 | (4) |
| 1995–1996 | Santos | | |
| 1997 | Atlético Mineiro | | |
| 1997 | Bahia | | |
| 1998 | Inter de Limeira | | |
| 1998 | Atlético Paranaense | | |
| 1999 | Santa Cruz | | |
| 2000 | Fortaleza | | |
| 2003 | CRB | | |
- * Club domestic league appearances and goals as of 17 October 2024

Marcos Adriano Gonçalves de Barros (born 30 July 1969), simply known as Marcos Adriano, is a Brazilian former professional footballer who played as a left back.

== Career ==
Left back, Marcos Adriano began his career at Fernandópolis in 1989. In 1990, he joined Operário-MS where he was state champion in 1991. In 1992, he was signed by São Paulo FC and was part of the state champion squad in 1992 and the 1993 Copa Libertadores. He later played for Flamengo where he made exactly 100 appearances. In 1995, he played for Santos FC and was voted Silver Ball in the Brazilian championship. In 1997 he was part of the CONMEBOL Cup winning squad with Atlético. Ended his career at CRB in 2003.

== Honours ==
Operário-MS

- Campeonato Sul-Matogrossense: 1991

São Paulo

- Copa Libertadores: 1993
- Campeonato Paulista: 1992

Flamengo

- Taça Guanabara: 1995

Atlético Mineiro

- Copa CONMEBOL: 1997
- Copa Centenário de Belo Horizonte: 1997

Atlético Paranaense

- Campeonato Paranaense: 1998

Fortaleza

- Campeonato Cearense: 2000

Individual

- 1995 Bola de Prata
