= Robson Agondi =

Brazilian footballer

Personal information
- Full name: Robson de Oliveira Agondi
- Date of birth: 29 January 1971 (age 55)
- Place of birth: Santos, Brazil
- Height: 1.90 m (6 ft 3 in)
- Position: Goalkeeper

Youth career
- 1986–1990: Santos

Senior career*
Years	Team	Apps	(Gls)
1990–1997	Santos	3	(0)
1991	→ Jabaquara (loan)		
1996	→ Londrina (loan)		
1996–1997	→ Remo (loan)		
1998	Pelotas		
1998	Paysandu		
1999	Flamengo	5	(0)
2000–2001	Portuguesa Santista		
2002	Paysandu		
2003–2004	América de Natal		
2004	→ Itumbiara (loan)		
2005	Ceilândia		
2007	Itumbiara		

Managerial career
- 2018: Zhejiang Yiteng (assistant)
- 2021: Portuguesa Santista (interim)
- 2023–2024: Brusque (assistant)
- 2024: Vila Nova (assistant)
- 2025: Paysandu (assistant)
- 2025: Vila Nova (assistant)
- * Club domestic league appearances and goals

Robson de Oliveira Agondi (born 29 January 1971), sometimes known as just Robson, is a Brazilian football coach and former player who played as a goalkeeper.

== Playing career ==
Formed in Santos FC youth categories, Robson remained at the club as a substitute until 1995. He was loaned to Remo where he managed to become two-time champion of Pará. He switched to rival Paysandu and repeated his success there again in the following years. In 1999 he went to Flamengo where he won the Copa Mercosur. He returned to the city of Santos to play this time in Portuguesa Santista, and in 2002 he returned to Paysandu once again, where he made history by winning the Copa dos Campeões.

== Managerial career ==
In 2018, he accepted an invitation from his friend Maurício Copertino to work in China as an assistant. In 2021, Robson was working as a goalkeeper coach at Portuguesa Santista when he was promoted to coach after Axel's dismissal. He was announced at the end of 2022 as Brusque's new technical assistant, working alongside Luizinho Lopes.

== Honours ==
Remo

- Campeonato Paraense: 1996, 1997

Paysandu

- Campeonato Paraense: 1998, 1999
- Copa Norte: 2002
- Copa dos Campeões: 2002

Flamengo

- Taça Guanabara: 1999
- Campeonato Carioca: 1999
- Copa Mercosur: 1999
