= Marquinhos Capixaba =

Brazilian footballer

Personal information
- Full name: Marco Antônio Moraes Wandermurem
- Date of birth: 22 September 1965 (age 61)
- Place of birth: Cachoeiro de Itapemirim, Brazil
- Height: 1.77 m (5 ft 10 in)
- Position: Right back

Youth career
- Botafogo-SP

Senior career*
Years	Team	Apps	(Gls)
1985–1987	Botafogo-SP		
1988	Guarani		
1989	São José-SP		
1990	Fluminense	40	(1)
1991	Sport Recife		
1991	Comercial-SP		
1992	Noroeste		
1993	Novorizontino		
1993	Rio Branco-SP		
1993	Paysandu		
1994–1995	Ferroviária		
1995	Santos		
1996	São Paulo	22	(0)
1996	Paraná		
1997	Inter de Limeira		
1997	Santa Cruz		
1998	Araçatuba		
1998	Londrina		
1999	Rio Branco-ES		
2002	Tupy-ES		
2003	Ituano		
2005	Vilavelhense		
2006	Rio Branco-ES		
2007	Pinheiros		
2008	Vitória-ES		
- * Club domestic league appearances and goals as of 11 October 2023

Marco Antônio Moraes Wandermurem (born 22 September 1965), better known as Marquinhos Capixaba, is a Brazilian former professional footballer who played as a right back.

== Career ==
Marquinhos started his career at Botafogo de Ribeirão Preto. In 1988, at Guarani FC, he was part of the Campeonato Paulista runner-up squad. In 1989 he was runner-up again, this time with São José.

Played for several other clubs until joining Santos FC in 1995, this time being runner-up in the 1995 Campeonato Brasileiro Série A. In 1996 at São Paulo FC, won the Copa Masters CONMEBOL.

== Honours ==
São Paulo

- Copa Masters CONMEBOL: 1996
