= Maurício Copertino =

Brazilian footballer (born 1970)

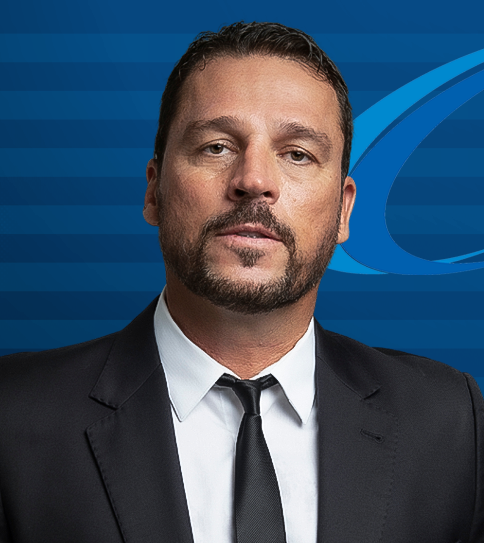
- Copertino in 2023

Personal information
- Full name: Maurício de Almeida Copertino
- Date of birth: 6 April 1970 (age 56)
- Place of birth: Santos, Brazil
- Height: 1.90 m (6 ft 3 in)
- Position: Centre-back

Team information
- Current team: Maranhão (head coach)

Youth career
- 1984–1990: Santos

Senior career*
Years	Team	Apps	(Gls)
1990–1996	Santos	46	(1)
1990	→ Jabaquara (loan)		
1991	→ Tupã (loan)	25	(1)
1992	→ Oeste (loan)	27	(6)
1996	→ Caxias (loan)	22	(2)
1996	Coritiba	2	(0)
1997	Portuguesa Santista	9	(0)
1997–1998	Al-Ahli	21	(1)
1998	Ferroviária	8	(0)
1999	Inter de Limeira	14	(2)
1999–2001	Panachaiki	41	(3)
2003	Henan Construction	25	(9)
2005	União São João	7	(0)

Managerial career
- 2006: Serrano
- 2006–2007: Sertãozinho (assistant)
- 2007: Botafogo-SP (assistant)
- 2007: Internacional (assistant)
- 2007–2008: Figueirense (assistant)
- 2008: Atlético Mineiro (assistant)
- 2009: Bahia (assistant)
- 2009: Santo André (assistant)
- 2010: Náutico (assistant)
- 2011: Al-Ain (assistant)
- 2011: Avaí (assistant)
- 2012: Náutico (assistant)
- 2013–2015: Brazil U20 (assistant)
- 2015: Portuguesa U20
- 2016: Tianjin Quanjian (assistant)
- 2017: Zhejiang Yiteng
- 2017: Bahia (assistant)
- 2018: Zhejiang Yiteng
- 2019: Vasco da Gama (assistant)
- 2020: Palmeiras (assistant)
- 2021: Cruzeiro (assistant)
- 2022: ASA
- 2022–2023: Baniyas U23
- 2023: Corinthians (assistant)
- 2024: Ferroviário
- 2025: Santos U20
- 2026: Santo André
- 2027–: Maranhão
- * Club domestic league appearances and goals

Maurício de Almeida Copertino (born 6 April 1970), known as Maurício Copertino, is a Brazilian professional football coach and former player who played as a centre-back. He is the current head coach of Maranhão.

== Playing career ==
Born in Santos, São Paulo, Copertino joined the youth categories of Santos FC in 1984. He made his senior debut while on loan at Jabaquara in 1990, later serving another temporary spells at Tupã and Oeste before returning to his parent club for the 1993 season.

In 1996, after another loan spell at Caxias, Copertino joined Coritiba. In 1997, after representing Portuguesa Santista, he moved abroad and joined Saudi club Al-Ahli.

Back to his home country in 1998, Copertino played for Ferroviária and Inter de Limeira before again moving abroad in the following year, with Panachaiki in Greece.

In 2003, Copertino signed for Chinese side Henan Construction. After a period at União São João, he announced his retirement on 10 December 2005, aged 35.

== Coaching career ==
After retiring, Copertino went on to take his coaching licenses and was named head coach of Serrano in 2006, but was dismissed soon after. In 2007, he worked as an assistant of Nenê Belarmino at Sertãozinho and Botafogo-SP, before joining Alexandre Gallo's staff at Internacional in April of that year, under the same role.

Copertino continued to work as Gallo's assistant in the following years, at Figueirense, Atlético Mineiro, Bahia, Santo André, Náutico (two stints), Al-Ain, Avaí and the Brazil national under-20 team. In 2016, after a period as head coach of the under-20 team of Portuguesa, he joined Vanderlei Luxemburgo's staff at Chinese side Tianjin Quanjian, also as an assistant.

On 1 December 2016, Copertino was appointed manager of China League One side Zhejiang Yiteng for the upcoming season. Sacked the following 28 May, he returned to Brazil and became an assistant of Preto Casagrande at Bahia, before being again named at the helm of Zhejiang on 2 January 2018.

Again dismissed by the Chinese side on 24 September 2018, Copertino reunited with Luxemburgo in 2019, being his assistant at Vasco da Gama. Another spells in the same role at Palmeiras and Cruzeiro followed, and he was later announced as head coach of ASA on 17 April 2022.

On 17 May 2022, Copertino resigned from ASA after receiving an offer from the United Arab Emirates, later revealed to be the under-23 side of Baniyas. In May 2023, he returned to Brazil and Corinthians, again as Luxemburgo's assistant.

On 31 January 2024, Copertino was appointed head coach of Ferroviário. On 7 May, however, he was sacked after a 5–0 loss to São Bernardo.

On 27 April 2025, Copertino returned to his first club Santos, as head coach of the under-20 team. He was dismissed on 22 August, and was announced as head coach of Santo André on 6 October.

Copertino was sacked by Ramalhão on 26 February 2026, after four wins in 13 matches. On 11 September, he was appointed in charge of Maranhão for the upcoming season.

== Career statistics ==
Club	Season	League			State League		Cup		Continental		Other		Total	
Club	Season	Division	Apps	Goals	Apps	Goals	Apps	Goals	Apps	Goals	Apps	Goals	Apps	Goals
Tupã (loan)	1991	Paulista A3	—		25	1	—		—		—		25	1
Oeste (loan)	1992	Paulista A3	—		27	6	—		—		—		27	6
Santos	1993	Série A	1	0	4	0	—		0	0	3 (Note: Appearance(s) in Torneio Rio–São Paulo)	0	8	0
Santos	1994	Série A	7	0	17	1	—		0	0	7 (Note: Appearance(s) in Copa Bandeirantes)	0	31	1
Santos	1995	Série A	0	0	17	0	—		0	0	3 (Note: Appearance(s) in Copa dos Campeões Mundiais)	0	20	0
Santos	Total		8	0	38	1	—		0	0	13	0	59	1
Caxias (loan)	1996	Série C	—		22	2	—		—		—		22	2
Coritiba	1996	Série A	2	0	—		—		—		—		2	0
Portuguesa Santista	1997	Série C	—		9	0	—		—		—		9	0
Al-Ahli	1997–98	Saudi Premier League	21	1	—		—		—		—		21	1
Ferroviária	1998	Paulista A3	—		8	0	—		—		—		8	0
Inter de Limeira	1999	Paulista	—		14	2	—		—		—		14	2
Panachaiki	1999–2000	Alpha Ethniki	24	2	—		—		—		—		24	2
Panachaiki	2000–01	Alpha Ethniki	17	1	—		5	0	—		1 (Note: Appearance(s) in Relegation play-offs)	0	23	1
Panachaiki	Total		41	3	—		5	0	—		1	0	47	3
União São João	2005	Série C	—		6	0	—		—		—		5	0
Career total			72	4	149	12	5	0	0	0	14	0	240	16

== Coaching statistics ==
As of 19 September 2026

Coaching record by team and tenure
Team	Nat	From	To	Record								Ref
Team	Nat	From	To	G	W	D	L	GF	GA	GD	Win %	Ref
Serrano	(Brazil)	1 January 2006	17 April 2006	3	0	0	3	0	8	−8	0.00	
Zhejiang Yiteng	(China)	1 December 2016	28 May 2017	12	5	3	4	14	13	+1	41.67	
Zhejiang Yiteng	(China)	2 January 2018	24 September 2018	26	10	6	10	40	42	−2	38.46	
ASA	(Brazil)	17 April 2022	17 May 2022	4	2	0	2	5	8	−3	50.00	
Ferroviário	(Brazil)	31 January 2024	7 May 2024	11	3	5	3	13	16	−3	27.27	
Santo André	(Brazil)	6 October 2025	26 February 2026	13	4	2	7	11	19	−8	30.77	
Maranhão	(Brazil)	11 September 2026	present	0	0	0	0	0	0	+0	—	
Total				69	24	16	29	83	106	−23	34.78	—

== Honours ==
=== Player ===
Oeste

- Campeonato Paulista Série A3: 1992
