= Macula (footballer) =

Brazilian footballer (born 1968)

Personal information
- Full name: Marcos Aurélio dos Santos
- Date of birth: May 22, 1968 (age 58)
- Place of birth: Rio de Janeiro, Brazil
- Height: 1.78 m (5 ft 10 in)
- Position: Midfielder

Youth career
- Bangu

Senior career*
Years	Team	Apps	(Gls)
1986–1988	Bangu	26	(1)
1990–1991	Fluminense	35	(1)
1992	Vasco da Gama	5	(0)
1993–1994	Palmeiras	0	(0)
1994	Remo	6	(0)
1995	Bahia	7	(0)
Total		79	(2)
- * Club domestic league appearances and goals

Marcos Aurélio dos Santos, usually known as Macula (born May 22, 1968), is a retired association footballer who played midfielder who played for several Série A clubs.

== Career ==
Born in Rio de Janeiro, he started his career playing for Bangu's youth squad, moving to the main team in 1986, playing 26 Série A games and scoring a goal before leaving the club in 1988. He played 35 Série A games and scored one goal for Fluminense between 1990 and 1991, and played five games while defending Vasco da Gama in 1992. While playing for Palmeiras in 1993 and in 1994, he won twice the Campeonato Paulista and the Série A, and won the Torneio Rio-São Paulo in 1993. Macula played six Série A games for Remo in 1994, and seven Série A games for Bahia in 1995.

== Honors ==
Palmeiras

- Série A: 1993, 1994
- Torneio Rio-São Paulo: 1993
- Campeonato Paulista: 1993, 1994
