= Gilberto (footballer, born 1968) =

Brazilian footballer

Personal information
- Full name: Gilberto Félix de Melo
- Date of birth: 5 October 1968 (age 58)
- Place of birth: Recife, Brazil
- Position: Goalkeeper

Youth career
- –1991: Sport Recife

Senior career*
Years	Team	Apps	(Gls)
1991–1992	Sport Recife		
1993	São Paulo	17	(0)
1993	→ Santa Cruz (loan)		
1994–1996	Santos		
1997–1998	Araçatuba		
1998	América Mineiro		
1998	Ceará		
1999–2000	Bahia		
2000	Ferroviário	10	(0)
2001–2004	Náutico		
2006	Botafogo-PB		
2007	Limoeirense		
2008–2009	CSA		

Managerial career
- 2010: Sete de Setembro (goalkeeper coach)
- 2012–2015: Sport Recife (goalkeeper coach)
- 2019: Náutico (goalkeeper coach)
- 2020: Central (goalkeeper coach)
- 2020–2021: Guarani (goalkeeper coach)
- 2022: Botafogo-PB (goalkeeper coach)
- * Club domestic league appearances and goals as of 11 October 2023

Gilberto Félix de Melo (born 5 October 1968), simply known as Gilberto, is a Brazilian former professional footballer who played as a goalkeeper.

== Career ==
Gilberto appeared in Sport and impressed by achieving 9 clean sheets in the 1992 Campeonato Brasileiro Série A, being elected to the Silver Ball. In 1993 he was part of the São Paulo squad that won the Copa Libertadores. Unable to establish himself, he went to several other clubs, most of them as a reserve. He is currently works as a goalkeeper coach.

== Honours ==
Sport Recife

- Campeonato Pernambucano: 1991, 1992

São Paulo

- Copa Libertadores: 1993

Náutico

- Campeonato Pernambucano: 2001, 2002, 2004

CSA

- Campeonato Alagoano: 2008

Individual

- 1992 Bola de Prata
