= Paulinho Kobayashi =

Brazilian footballer (born 1970)

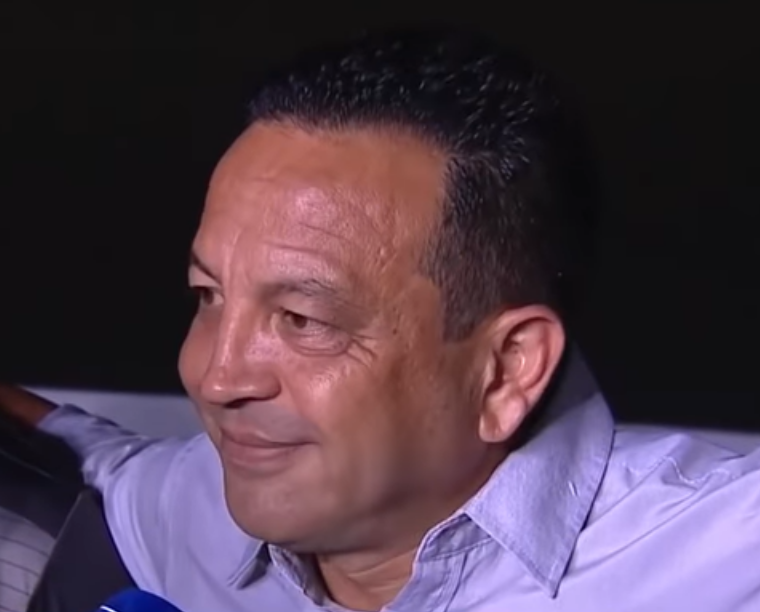

Personal information
- Full name: Paulo Ricardo Kobayashi
- Date of birth: 9 January 1970 (age 56)
- Place of birth: Osasco, Brazil
- Height: 1.71 m (5 ft 7 in)
- Position: Forward

Team information
- Current team: Centro Oeste (head coach)

Senior career*
Years	Team	Apps	(Gls)
1989–1992	São Caetano		
1993	Portuguesa		
1994	Santos		
1994	Atlético Paranaense		
1995	Rio Branco-SP		
1995	Vitória		
1995	Caxias		
1996	Ponte Preta		
1996	Portuguesa Santista		
1997	Atlético Goianiense		
1997	América de Natal		
1998	Ceará		
1998	Iraklis		
1998–1999	Panachaiki		
1999–2000	Ionikos		
2000–2002	Chalkidona		
2003	Ionikos		
2004	Villa Nova		
2005	União São João		
2005	Vila Nova		
2005–2006	América de Natal		
2006	Mineiros		
2007	CRAC		
2007	Brasiliense		
2008	CRAC		
2008	América de Natal		
2009	Guaratinguetá		
2009	Bragantino		

Managerial career
- 2009: Bahia (assistant)
- 2010: Portuguesa Santista
- 2010: Francana
- 2011: Taquaritinga
- 2012: Jabaquara
- 2013: Santacruzense
- 2014: Villa Nova
- 2015–2016: Penapolense
- 2017: São José de Ribamar
- 2017: Altos
- 2018: Imperatriz
- 2018: Altos
- 2019: Floresta
- 2019–2020: Imperatriz
- 2021: Altos
- 2022: Ferroviário
- 2022: Moto Club
- 2023: Ferroviário
- 2024: Capital
- 2024: Ferroviário
- 2025: Capital
- 2025: Imperatriz
- 2026–: Centro Oeste
- * Club domestic league appearances and goals

Paulo Ricardo Kobayashi (born 9 January 1970), known as Paulinho Kobayashi, is a Brazilian football manager and former player who played as a forward. He is the current head coach of Centro Oeste.

Kobayashi began his career with Associação Desportiva São Caetano. He played for Portuguesa, Santos, Vitória and América-RN in the Campeonato Brasileiro Série A. He also spent three seasons with Ionikos and one season with Panachaiki in the Super League Greece.

== Honours ==
=== Player ===
São Caetano

- Campeonato Paulista Série A3: 1991

América de Natal

- Copa do Nordeste: 1998

=== Manager ===
Altos

- Campeonato Piauiense: 2017, 2018

Ferroviário

- Campeonato Brasileiro Série D: 2023
