= Third-party ownership in association football =

Third-party ownership in association football is the ownership of a player's economic rights by third-party sources. The third-party—which can be an agent such as a football agent, an agency, such as a sports-management agency, a company, investors such as a hedge-fund, or a single investor—"takes ownership of all or part of the financial rights to a player". In some cases when a footballer is sold, the practice (abbreviated TPO), not the football club, can benefit from transfer fees and contract negotiations fees. This differs from co-ownership in football, where a player's transfer rights are shared between two clubs. The practice has been widely used in football in South America, particularly in countries such as Brazil and Argentina, with a system of players, clubs, agents, teams, and investors involved. It is associated with football clubs with few financial options that face financial hardship, and are sometimes insolvent. By 2007, TPOs had become common practice in football in Portugal, Spain and Russia.

According to a 2007 article in The Guardian and academic articles, businessmen or other investors buy shares in the economic rights of young players and often cover the costs of their training and accommodation. In return, they are entitled to a percentage of a player's future transfer fee. A 2016 article in the Daily Mirror explained how third-party owners may either purchase a percentage of a player's "economic rights" from the club, or even purchase a player's contract. Owning the contract allows the third-party owner to increase profits by "parking a player" at a club temporarily until the player's value appreciates, at which time he is sold to another club and the agent earns a percentage of the transfer fees.

In April 2015, FIFA announced the banning of third-party ownership, and specifically prohibited either clubs or players from entering into economic rights agreements with third-party investors. The ban took effect on 1 May 2015. The European Parliament also announced a similar ban in European sports on 11 November 2015 following the passing of Rule 136 of Parliament's Rules of Procedure. In a written declaration, the European Parliament states that third-party ownership raises concerns over the integrity of competitions and introduces risks of criminal activities into sports. According to a 2015 Bloomberg News article, the Football Leaks uncovered secretive "financing practice for the global sport" with "one of the biggest firms investing millions in soccer-player futures". One method of circumventing the 2015 FIFA ban is to utilise a floating charge over designated accounts where the proceeds of player transfers is paid into. This was notably used by Porto.

== Regulations ==
At its annual general meeting in June 2008, the English Premier League drafted new rules L34 and L35 to restrict third party ownership of players from the beginning of the 2008–9 season; however, FIFA (football's international governing body) third-party rules differ drastically from the Premier League, which creates substantial gaps in the enforcement of TPO. Premier League rules authorise financial institutions to hold player economic rights - which Maciel & Walton suggests, appears to be a contravention of the all-encompassing FIFA ban. In 2007 as reported in The Guardian, The league's rule U18 had previously stated that the third parties were not permitted to "materially influence" a club's "policies or the performances of its teams".

In October 2007, it was reported that FIFA was acting to ban TPO. Article 18 of FIFA's Rules on the Status and Transfer of Players does restrict the practice, at least as far as a third party's influence is concerned, stating: "No club shall enter into a contract which enables any other party to that contract or any third party to acquire the ability to influence in employment and transfer related matters its independence, its policies or the performance of its teams". In September 2014, UEFA announced they were going to tackle the issue. Later that month, FIFA announced they would ban the practice. In July 2015 a Belgian court rejected an appeal against the banning of TPO. By 2016, TPO was strictly forbidden in England.

== Reception ==
Third-party ownership became controversial in English football after the arrival at West Ham United of Carlos Tevez and Javier Mascherano from the Brazilian club Corinthians in August 2006. One unidentified official called it "an unedifying trade in young people that rips the heart out of clubs which try to develop players". Gordon Taylor, chief executive of the Professional Footballers' Association, said of third-party ownership: "It is like trading in human beings. And it's destabilising for outsiders to have a financial interest in players." In April 2015, UEFA and FIFPro spoke out against the practise, stating it should be outlawed. By 2016, FIFA was attempting to tighten rules regarding TPO, which "has been described in some quarters as modern-day slavery."

Defenders of the practice said that it constitutes a way of sharing the burden of investment in a player. The super agent Pini Zahavi, himself associated with third-party ownership and the companies that invested in players, said: "In England they don't understand it at all. It's easier to buy a player who you are unsure about for £10m if you are sharing the risk with a partner. Now, if the player becomes top-drawer and is sold for £30m, then of course you may feel stupid only to own half. But if the player turns out to be merely average or a failure, if he cannot even be sold, you will say, 'Fantastic, the disaster was not only mine'. That's exactly the way it works." The businessman Kia Joorabchian, heavily involved in the third-party ownership of players, defended the arrangement, calling it "the South American model and a model that appears all over Europe". After the Premiership introduced rules against TPO, lawyer Jean-Louis Dupont claimed that it was illegal.

== Examples ==
=== Corinthians ===
In 2004, the Media Sports Investments fund, founded and headed by Kia Joorabchian, purchased a controlling 51% of Corinthians in a 10-year deal. In the wake of MSI's involvement a stream of new players arrived at the club, players who were engaged to play for Corinthians but whose economic rights were partly or wholly owned by the investment fund. By 2006 MSI was listing as its investments not just Corinthians itself but also the players Carlos Tevez, Marcelo Mattos, Gustavo Nery, Roger Flores, Javier Mascherano, Carlos Alberto, Sebastián Domínguez, Nilmar, Marinho, and Rafael Moura.

=== Carlos Tevez and Javier Mascherano ===
On 31 August 2006, Carlos Tevez and Javier Mascherano moved to West Ham United in the English Premier League from Brazilian side Corinthians for an undisclosed fee. It subsequently emerged that Tevez's economic rights were owned by Media Sports Investments and a second company, Just Sports Inc., while Mascherano was jointly owned by Global Soccer Agencies and Mystere Services Ltd. All four companies were represented by Kia Joorabchian and the deal was brokered by MSI, whose president Joorabchian had been until June 2006.

Due to irregularities in the player's contracts, West Ham United were eventually fined a record £5.5 million by the Premier League. Despite the fine, Tevez was allowed to continue playing for West Ham United. Both players remained in England after the controversy; Tevez moved to Manchester United while Mascherano went to play for Liverpool. Manchester United failed to agree a price with Tevez's owner and he left for city rival Manchester City in summer 2009. Joorabchian subsequently claimed that many Premier League players and teams conceal their third-party ownership of players. The Premier League took steps to outlaw third-party ownership in 2008.

=== Anderson ===
In 2007 the Brazilian footballer Anderson was transferred from Porto to Manchester United. As part of that deal Porto paid the agent Jorge Mendes a reported £4 million for his share of Anderson's registration. Mendes was said to have contributed 20% of the £3.75 million Porto paid Anderson's previous club (Grêmio) to sign the midfielder in 2006.

=== Jô ===
In June 2008, the transfer of Brazilian player Jô from Russian side CSKA Moscow to English team Manchester City was initially blocked by the Premier League while they investigated the third-party ownership of the player. Jô, who had played at Corinthians before moving to CSKA Moscow in 2006, was associated with Media Sports Investments and Kia Joorabchian. In 2009, it was reported that the unnamed investors represented by Kia Joorabchian were understood to own the economic rights to 60 or 70 players across Europe and South America. He was linked with Manchester City's failed bid for then Milan midfielder Kaká.

=== Ramires ===
In June 2010 it was reported that Kia Joorabchian had secured a 50% share in the Brazilian midfielder Ramires, then at Benfica but subject to transfer interest from across Europe, led by Chelsea in the English Premier League. The deal was reportedly part of an agreement reached with Benfica president Luís Filipe Vieira the previous year at the time of Ramires' transfer to Benfica from Cruzeiro in Brazil. A further 30% of the player's rights were reportedly owned by Joorabchian's associate Pini Zahavi. Ramires completed his move to Chelsea on 13 August 2010 on a four-year contract for a reported fee of £17million. It is thought that Joorabchian would receive £6m of this fee.

=== Portugal ===
When third-party ownership was allowed in Portugal, agent company GestiFute and investment funds bought part of the economic rights of the players, such as Bebé and Deco of Porto. Sporting and Boavista also once partnered with First Portuguese to set up an investment fund, while Benfica set up its own fund (Benfica Stars Fund). A part of football agent company and bank fund, José Bosingwa was once shared by Porto and International Foot, while Manuel Fernandes was partly owned by Global Sports Agency. Porto also sold 37.5% economic rights of João Moutinho to Mamers BV. After acquired 75% economic rights of Walter, Porto re-sold 25% economic rights to Pearl Design Holding Ltd. for €2,125,000. Aly Cissokho's 10% rights was once held by Onsoccer – International Gestão e Marketing, S.A., an agent until he was sold to Lyon.

=== South America and rest of the world ===
Traffic Group owned Brazilian Gustavo, as well as 50% of Mozambican Mexer. It also acquired rights of Diego Souza and Lenny from Fluminense in January 2008. In 2009, it acquired all the rights of Alan, 50% of Maicon, Dalton, Raphael Augusto; 30% of Sandro, Fernando Bob; 25% of João Paulo, Brayan and Matheus Carvalho; 20% of Tartá. It owned 25% shares on Hernanes until he transferred to Lazio. Barcelona bought Keirrison and Henrique from Palmeiras, but on its annual report it shown the payment were transferred to Desportivo Brasil Participaçoes Ltda.

Turbo Sports owned Colombian 80% of Pablo Armero's rights. From December 2010 to January 2011, TEISA bought 5% and 20% rights of Neymar and Elano respectively. Doyen Sports Investment benefited from the trade in footballers' TPOs of footballers. They owned the "global sponsorship rights" of Neymar, one of football's "most celebrated players".

=== Others ===
Argentina

- Mario Bolatti
- Fernando Belluschi
- Luciano Figueroa
- Marco Torsiglieri with Fundo CAIC LLC

Brazil

- Luís Fabiano (Porto and Global Soccer Investments)
- Felipe
- Marcos Aurélio (Energy Empreend e Participações)
- Geílson (with Bertolucci Assessoria)
- Filipe Luís, Hulk, Thiago Ribeiro, Rodrigo Tiuí, Warley, and Walter through Rentistas, a Uruguayan low division club
- Kerlon
- Zé Roberto, his agent Juan Figer holds the right
- Leonardo

Chile
Colombia

- Radamel Falcao

Uruguay

- Cristian Rodríguez (through Play International B.V.)

== See also ==
- Co-ownership (association football)
