= Kia Joorabchian =

Iranian businessman (born 1971)

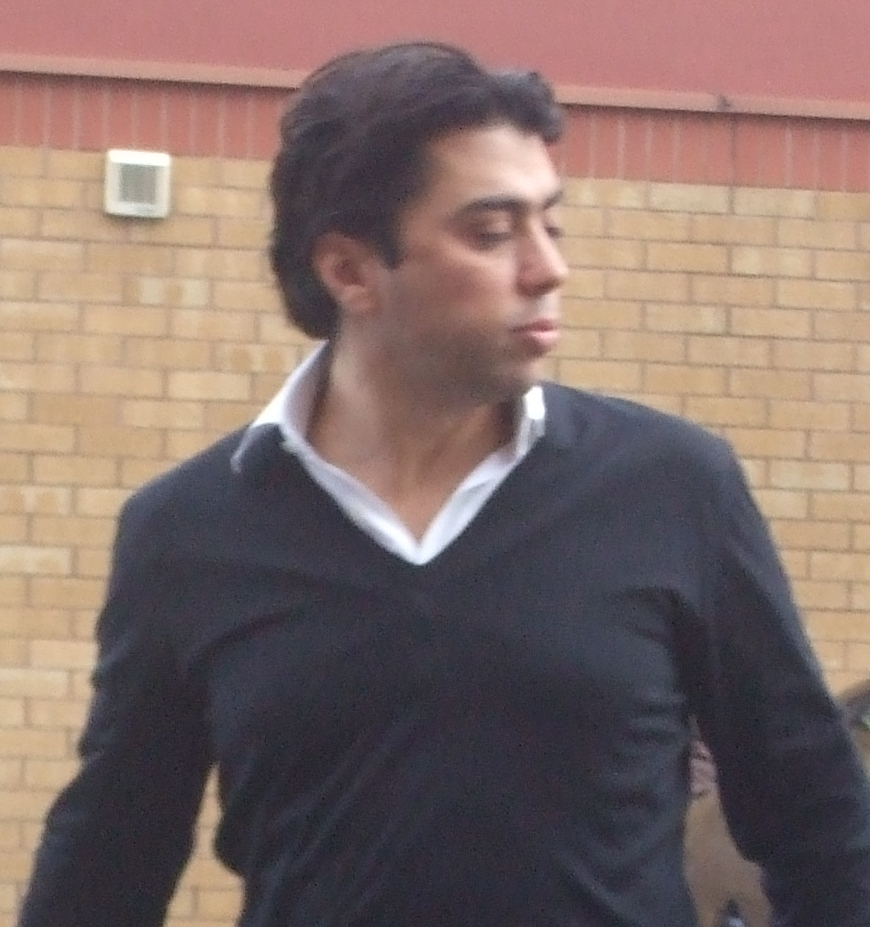
- Joorabchian in 2009
- Born: Kiavash Joorabchian; 14 July 1971 (age 55); Tehran, Iran
- Citizenship: Iran, Britain, Canada
- Education: Shiplake College; University of London
- Occupation: Businessman
- Years active: 1998–present
- Spouse: Tatiana Alonso (m. 2007)

Kiavash Joorabchian (Persian: کیاوش جورابچيان) is an Iranian-born British-educated businessman largely involved in association football. In the register of directorships at Companies House in London, Joorabchian gives two nationalities, Canadian and British, born on 14 July 1971.

Although routinely described in the press as a football agent, Joorabchian is not a licensed agent. The involvement of unlicensed agents in transfers in the English Premier League is prohibited by the Football Association. Joorabchian does not himself claim to be an agent, saying "I think the agency business is very different". He describes his business as advising players on their rights and clubs on transfers and contracts.

Joorabchian is also involved in the 'third-party' ownership of players, describing himself as an investment manager. In October 2008, he said, "I manage the investment group and obviously when the investment group is profitable, as fund manager, you also get a cut". In 2009 it was reported that the unnamed investors represented by Joorabchian were understood to own the economic rights to 60 or 70 players across Europe and South America.

== Family background and education ==
Kiavash Joorabchian was born in Tehran, Iran, as the son of Iranian car-dealer businessman, Mohammed Joorabchian. According to Joorabchian his father's uncle had once run the biggest car manufacturer in the Middle East. The Joorabchian family emigrated from Iran following the fall of the Shah in 1979. They went to the United Kingdom and then Canada, returning to England when Joorabchian was 16. His father ran car dealerships, including Medway Autos in Kent.

Joorabchian was educated at Shiplake College in Oxfordshire and then at a school in Golders Green, north London. He went on to study chemistry and business studies at Queen Mary and Westfield College, University of London, dropping out after his second year.

He has supported Arsenal Football Club since his childhood and later kept a corporate box at their Emirates Stadium. Due to his association with Arsenal he has forged a close relationship with David Dein and his son Darren.

Joorabchian is married to Brazilian lawyer and restaurateur Tatiana Alonso.

== Early career, American Capital and Kommersant ==
Joorabchian worked first for his father and then as a trader at the International Petroleum Exchange in London. He became involved in the stock market and fund management, moving to New York City and establishing an investment company, American Capital LLC, based in Manhattan but registered in Delaware.

A year later and six months before the 1999 Russian legislative election, American Capital bought 85% of the Russian newspaper Kommersant. After a month Kommersant's ownership passed to the oligarch Boris Berezovsky, who was widely suspected to have been behind American Capital's bid for the paper, something denied by Joorabchian who was said to have given assurances that he was not working on anyone else's behalf.

Although Joorabchian suffered in the stock market crash of 2001, his sale of American Capital after that volatility brought him, on his own estimate, between £50 million and £60 million.

== Involvement in football ==
=== Media Sports Investments and Corinthians ===
In 2004, Joorabchian founded Media Sports Investments to make a partnership with Brazilian football club Corinthians. He had briefly considered becoming involved at Arsenal, but found it too expensive and had instead been pointed towards Brazilian football by Pelé's agent and the recommendation of Pini Zahavi, the so-called 'super agent', whom Joorabchian described in 2006 as a friend of long standing.

The partnership with Corinthians's was a 10-year deal stipulating that MSI would provide $35 million –$20 million of which would cover debts– in return for 51% of future profits. Joorabchian moved to Brazil and changed the way Corinthians was run, increasing revenue by 500% in the first year.

A series of major signings followed MSI's investment, including, most spectacularly, Carlos Tevez, who was signed from Boca Juniors for $22 million, an unprecedented amount for a transfer by a South American club. These were players who were engaged to play for Corinthians but whose economic rights were partly or wholly owned by MSI. By 2006 the company was listing as its investments not just Corinthians, but also the players Carlos Tevez, Marcelo Mattos, Gustavo Nery, Roger, Javier Mascherano, Carlos Alberto, Sebastián Domínguez and Marinho. In 2005 Corinthians won its fourth Brazilian title.

The Tevez transfer was brokered by the Argentinian football agent Fernando Hidalgo, who was a partner in the company HAZ Sports with Pini Zahavi. Zahavi, responsible for numerous football deals, including the acquisition of Chelsea Football Club by Roman Abramovich, acted as a broker for MSI.

The source of the money behind MSI was a subject of considerable speculation. The Spanish sports newspaper Diario AS suggested that a 15% share was owned by Abramovich, while Joorabchian's name continued to be linked to that of Berezovsky. In 2005 the Georgian businessman and owner of Dinamo Tbilisi, Badri Patarkatsishvili, a close associate of Berezovsky, told a journalist that they had indeed invested in Corinthians. Joorabchian himself was described by Brazilian authorities as "trying, at all costs, to hide knowledge of the people and businesses involved in the transactions". (Note: In 2005, Badri Patarkatsishvili alleged "We have invested in a wonderful football club in Brazil, Corinthians. We have invested in the Brazil team with Boris Berezovsky." He also alleged that money "has a wonderful habit of flowing where it feels comfortable".)

In 2007, following allegations that Corinthians had been used to launder money, a Brazilian judge, Faustus Martins de Sanctis, ordered the arrest of Berezovsky, Joorabchian, Nojan Bedroud, cofounder of MSI, and four officials of club, including the chairman, Alberto Dualib. MSI responded by saying that the judge's actions were "absurd, arbitrary and lacking legal backing", while Joorabchian denied any wrongdoing and maintained that all payments made to Corinthians were "cleared through and approved by the Brazilian Central Bank".

The Brazilian court papers setting out the evidence on which the warrants of arrest were issued stated: "MSI belongs and has always belonged to the accused, Boris Berezovsky". Berezovsky denied any business connection with Joorabchian or MSI.

In the light of these developments Corinthians broke off their association with MSI in July 2007. There had already been a public deterioration in relations between the directors of the club and its investors centering on the involvement of MSI and Joorabchian in the team's affairs, and the fact that the club had been left owning only five members of the playing squad. Tevez and Mascherano had been transferred to West Ham United and there had been seven different managers in 18 months. In December 2007 Corinthians were relegated from Brazil's first division.

The warrant for Joorabchian's arrest was suspended by the Brazilian authorities in August 2008.

In April 2014, The judge totally absolved the whole case saying there was never anything done wrong by anyone in the case at all. "In this case, there is no proof of a single offense, nor is it pointed out that the alleged group ever have had any intention or interest in the committing any crimes," added the judge.

=== Tevez, Mascherano and West Ham United ===
Joorabchian stepped down as president of Media Sports Investments in June 2006. It was reported at the time that Joorabchian retained an investment in Tevez and Mascherano, whose economic rights were described as being owned by MSI. A subsequent Premier League investigation revealed that in February 2006 rights in Tevez had been transferred to MSI (company id: 05218027) and a second company, Just Sports Inc., while Mascherano was jointly owned by Global Soccer Agencies and Mystere Services Ltd. All four companies were represented by Joorabchian.

In August 2006 the two players joined West Ham in the English Premier League. Pini Zahavi assisted in the transfers, revealing to the press that he stood to make money if the players were a success in England. Zahavi had an association over a number of years with Global Soccer Agencies, owners of a half share in Mascherano.

Zahavi also suggested that he had the idea for Joorabchian's proposed takeover of West Ham itself, "Was it my idea? Yes it was," Zahavi said. Joorabchian had investigated the possibility of a takeover of the club the autumn before Tevez and Mascherano moved to West Ham, promising to make £100 million available for new players in a £200 million deal valuing the club and its debts at £75 million. The takeover floundered when it proved impossible to agree a valuation for the club but the possibility was revived following the Tevez/Mascherano transfer. Patarkatsishvili announced that he was considering becoming involved in the bid. In the end no offer resulted and the club was sold to a consortium headed by Eggert Magnusson.

Although the capture of Tevez and Mascherano was reported as a major coup for West Ham, the third-party ownership of the players proved highly controversial. At that time the practice was permitted as long as the investing party exercised no influence over the club's playing or transfer policy. It has been reported that Joorabchian in fact retained the power to transfer either player at any time during their contracts.

In April 2007 West Ham was fined a record £5.5 million by the Premier League for entering into third-party contracts whose existence they did not reveal in the knowledge that, in the words of the Premier League's findings, "the FAPL at the very least may not – and in all probability would not – have approved of such contracts". When Tevez was instrumental in West Ham's avoiding relegation at the end of the 2006–7 season the position was legally challenged by the relegated club, Sheffield United, on the ground that Tevez should have been ineligible to play. The claim was eventually settled out of court in March 2009 with West Ham paying Sheffield United £20 million over five years.

Speculation has subsequently linked Joorabchian with the takeover of the football clubs Fulham, in early 2007, and Southampton, in January 2008.

=== Transfer of Tevez to Manchester United and then to Manchester City ===
In August 2007 Carlos Tevez moved from West Ham United to Manchester United. The deal was subject to a protracted dispute with West Ham claiming that the player was registered to them and contracted until June 2010. The Premier League insisted that negotiations should be "done directly" with the club who should receive the fee for any transfer. Joorabchian maintained that MSI and Just Sports Inc retained the economic rights to the player and that the deal had been negotiated with the "knowledge and permission" of West Ham. In a statement issued on behalf of MSI Joorabchian said that West Ham had "consistently provided private assurances while at the same time making contrary statements to the public at large".

Asked for a ruling by the Football Association and the Premier League, FIFA judged that the matter should be referred to the Court of Arbitration for Sport. MSI and Just Sports Inc then issued a writ in order to "compel West Ham to release the registration of Carlos Tevez in accordance with contracts entered into between the parties".

The threat of action in the High Court was avoided by a settlement that saw West Ham receive a fee of £2 million for Tévez's registration. Joorabchian later claimed that West Ham agreed to return the money with additional legal costs bringing the total to £2.6 million, apparently contradicting the club's claim to the Premier League that they would be the beneficiary of the fee.

The terms of the transfer saw Manchester United agree a two-year deal in which Tevez's registration was leased by the club while his economic rights were retained by his third-party owners. Manchester United paid £3–4 million a year for Tevez's commercial and football rights for the duration of the lease and secured the first option on a permanent transfer.

In September 2009 Tevez signed for Manchester City in a deal removing him from third-party ownership sometimes reported as being worth £47 million to the companies owning his economic rights, although that amount was disputed by Joorabchian who called the story "inaccurate and misleading".

=== Legal dispute with West Ham United ===
In 2008, Joorabchian became engaged in a legal dispute with West Ham United over what he said were unmet payments by the club of £4.5 million and £2.6 million relating to Tevez. Joorabchian claimed that he brokered a resolution between West Ham and the two companies, MSI and Just Sports Inc, who owned the player's economic rights and who initially refused to cancel that third-party arrangement as requested by the Premier League as part of their findings of April 2007. Potentially Tevez would not have played in the final two games of the 2006–7 season.

Joorabchian stated that the payments were to cover costs, the player's salary, expenses and a loan fee, as well as £2 million he claimed to have paid to West Ham for Tevez's registration as part of the deal that saw the player transferred to Manchester United in August 2007. Joorabchian's allegation that Tevez received a salary and expenses other than that paid to him by West Ham, would –were those payments to have been met by a third party– have breached the Premier League's regulations. West Ham United claimed they were unaware of such payments.

The eventual out-of-court settlement of these proceedings saw Joorabchian engaged as a consultant by West Ham with fees of more than £2 million. In this capacity Joorabchian was critical of transfer dealings made by Eggert Magnusson and the club's former manager, Alan Curbishley, who resigned saying that transfer policy had been taken out of his hands.

=== Defence of 'Third-Party' ownership ===
Tevez's ownership and the role of Joorabchian in English football remained highly controversial throughout the period up to the player's transfer to Manchester City in September 2009. Joorabchian's continued opacity on the question of the identity of those behind the companies he represented was a point of particular discussion.

The heavily criticised involvement of third parties in the ownership of players was banned by the Premier League for the start of the 2008–9 season. One high-ranking official had called it, "an unedifying trade in young people that rips the heart out of clubs which try to develop players". Joorabchian himself offered a defence of the arrangement, calling it "the South American model and a model that appears all over Europe".

Joorabchian also claimed that concealed third-party ownership arrangements were common in the Premier League, saying in 2007: "I know a lot of players in the Premier League – and other leagues – which are here in the same format as we have done, but in a hidden scheme".

=== Connection to Manchester City ===
In January 2009 it emerged that Joorabchian had been present at a meeting between representatives of Manchester City and AC Milan, arranged to discuss the possible -although in the end unsuccessful- £91 million transfer to City of the Brazilian footballer, Kaká.

Press reports connected Joorabchian to City's signing of Robinho in 2008 and suggested that he was exercising a wider influence over the shape of City's transfer policy, specifically in attempting to bring a single megastar to the club to reflect a changed status under the ownership of Mansour bin Zayed Al Nahyan, rather than build a side of proven Premier League performers. Joorabchian admitted to having an informal association with Manchester City in October 2008.

Sources at Manchester City suggested that Joorabchian and Pini Zahavi had developed links to the club under the regime of the previous owner, Thaksin Shinawatra, who had originally appointed the City chief executive Garry Cook. Cook himself said that the club "did not need and did not seek" Joorabchian's help in facilitating the negotiations with A.C. Milan. Joorabchian was involved in the leaking of Carlos Tevez's transfer request to Manchester City on 11 December 2010, by revealing the news to the Sunday Mirror newspaper.

=== Involvement with Ramires ===
In June 2010, it was reported that Joorabchian had secured a 50% share in the Brazilian midfielder Ramires for €6 million (through Jazzy Limited, Joorabchian as sole director), then at Benfica but subject to transfer interest from across Europe, led by Chelsea in the Premier League. The deal was reportedly part of an agreement reached with Benfica president Luís Filipe Vieira the previous year at the time of Ramires' transfer to Benfica from Cruzeiro in Brazil.

Benfica declared in its financial report that the club received €11 million (50% of the fee) and generated €8.8 million profit.

Ramires completed his move to Chelsea on 13 August 2010 on a four-year contract for a fee of €22 million. It is thought that Joorabchian would receive around €11 million of this fee; Benfica also revealed in its financial report that the club had a net debt of €5,479,526 to Jazzy Limited, excessed €479,526 by €11 million minus €6 million.

=== Newcastle United ===
On 12 January 2010, it was reported by outlets such as ESPN that Joorabchian had been appointed to the position of "Football Advisor" at the club, and would be leading a clear-out of players, bringing in talented youth from around the world.

=== Sports Invest UK Limited ===
Joorabchian is the sole director of Sports Invest UK Limited, with registered FIFA agent Nojan Bedroud. The company was a creditor of Portsmouth F.C. for £600,000.

=== Everton Football Club ===
Joorabchian's involvement with Everton in January 2022 was matched with protests and banners outside Goodison Park.

=== Reading Football Club ===
Joorabchian is also involved with Reading officially as an advisor to the club and the owner, when asked if he is involved at the club in January 2022, Reading manager Veljko Paunovic said "He's friends with the owner. He's known as an advisor not only with our owner. He's been involved in football for a long time so that's all I can say.".

== Other business interests ==
An analysis of Joorabchian's other business interests undertaken by the Financial Times in 2006 suggested that he was at that time a director of 10 UK companies, many of them lossmaking, including Karmaa Racing, a horse racing company, and Karmaa, a kick-boxing club in Chalk Farm, London. His largest listed interest was at that time a car dealership, Greens of Rainham.
