= Alberto Dualib =

Brazilian businessman and football executive (1919–2021)

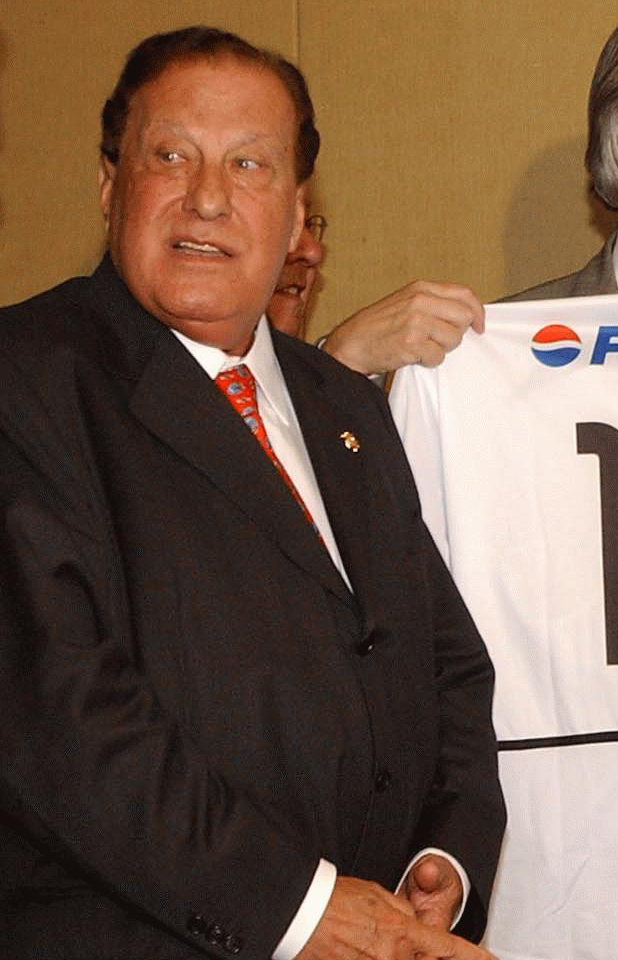
- Dualib in 2003
- Born: 14 December 1919; São Paulo, Brazil
- Died: 13 July 2021 (aged 101); São Paulo, Brazil
- Occupation(s): Businessman, football executive, President of Sport Club Corinthians Paulista
- Website: http://www.corinthians.com.br

Alberto Dualib (14 December 1919 – 13 July 2021) was a Brazilian businessman and football executive of Lebanese descent born to Lebanese Christian immigrants from Zahlé. Alberto Dualib was Sport Club Corinthians Paulista's chairman between 1993 and 2007. He worked with: Nesi Curi, Clodomil Antonio Orsi, Wilson Bento, Aurélio de Paula, Osmar Stábile, Antonio Jorge, Rachid Junior, Emerson Piovezan, Farid Zablith Filho, Jorge Agle Kalil, Francisco Teocharis Papaiordanou Jr., Ílton José da Costa, Paulino Tritapepe Neto. As the club chairman, he made a contract with Media Sports Investments, controlled by Kia Joorabchian, and with the Russian oligarch Boris Berezovsky as one of its investors. Renato Duprat was his right arm. With MSI's aid, Dualib contracted many stars for Corinthians, like: Carlos Tevez, Nilmar Honorato da Silva, Javier Mascherano, Marcelo Mattos, Roger, Gustavo Nery, Carlos Alberto and others.

He died on 13 July 2021 at the age of 101.

== Titles ==
- FIFA Club World Cup
- Brazilian Série A
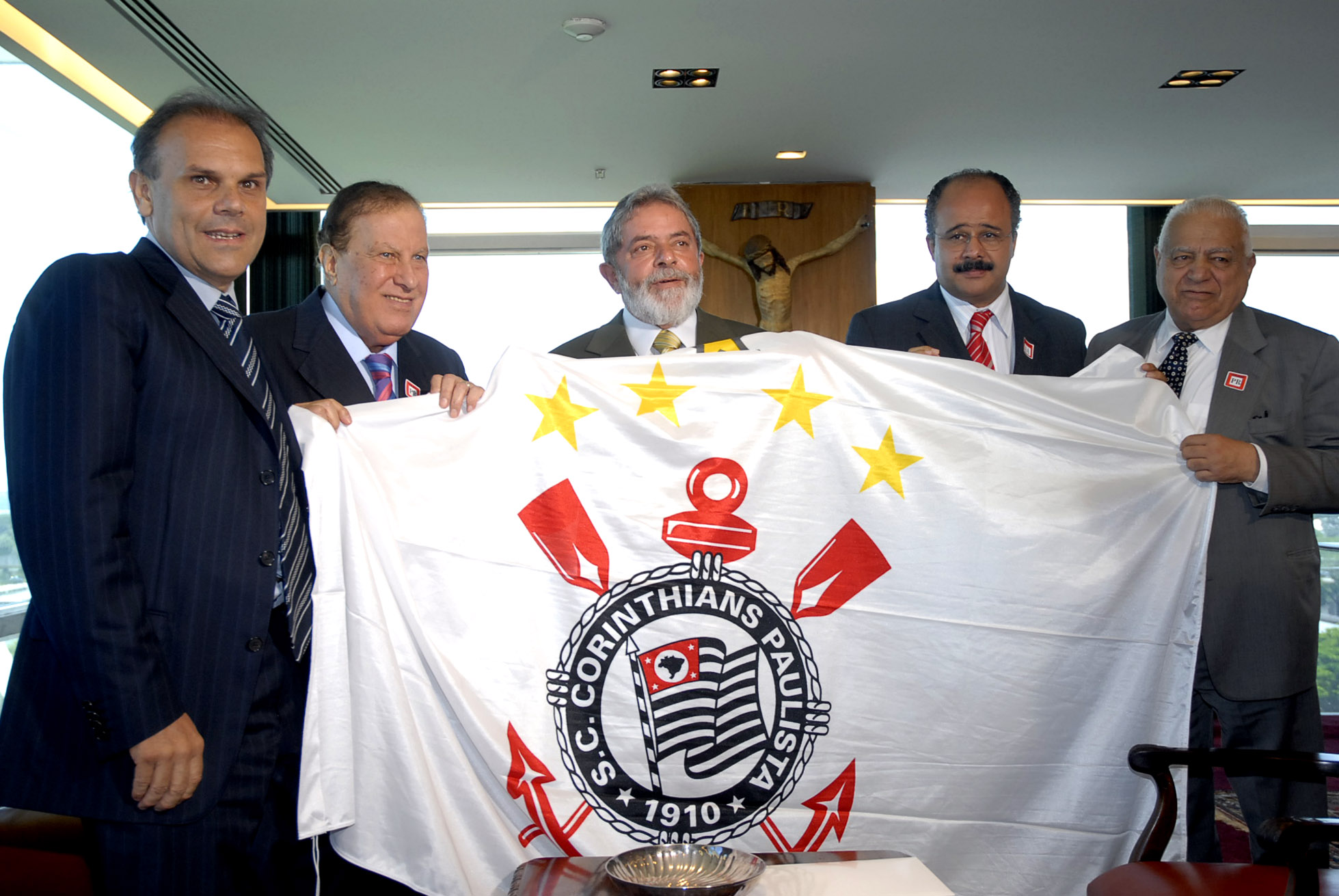
  Renato Duprat, Alberto Dualib, Luiz Inácio Lula da Silva and club directors.
- Brazilian Cup
- Trofeo Ramón de Carranza
- Rio-São Paulo Tournament
- São Paulo State Championship
- Dallas Cup
- Nike Cup
- Copa São Paulo de Juniores
- Bandeirantes Cup
