= HAZ Sport Agency =

HAZ Sport Agency is a sports agency found by Fernando Hidalgo and Pini Zahavi. Instead of broker business, the company also involved in third-party ownership in association football. The company bought economic rights of footballer from the club for the beneficiary behind the company.

== Notable third-party deals ==
- (Argentina) Guillermo Burdisso (25%)
- (Brazil) Bruno Pereira Mendes
- (Paraguay) Néstor Ortigoza (50%)

== See also ==
- Media Sports Investment
- Rio Football Services
