= Rio Football Services =

Israeli private investment firm

Rio Football Services Limited is a private investment firm in association football based in Israel. The firm has been linked to super-agent Pini Zahavi. The company is registered in Gibraltar, a tax haven.

Through subsidiaries Rio Football Services Hungary Szolgaltato KFT, Rio Football Services Malta and Rio Football Services Holland BV, the company purchased part of the ownership of footballers and received part of the transfer fee when they were sold. The company has been known as Global Soccer Agencies Limited, Global Soccer Investments. It was reported it once submitted a takeover bid for Polonia Warszawa.

The company, funded by unknown backers, was associated with Media Sports Investment, run by Zahavi's friend Kia Joorabchian, to bring players to Sport Club Corinthians Paulista, namely Carlos Alberto from Porto, and Javier Mascherano from River Plate.

The following players were once, or are currently, partly owned by Rio Football Services:

- (Argentina) Fernando Belluschi (50%)
- (Argentina) Lucho González (50%) (GSA and later Rio Football Services)
- (Argentina) Lisandro López (50%) (GSA and later Rio)
- (Brazil) Luís Fabiano (75%) GSI (and later Rio) Through Selkan Limited, London (defunct); Jonathan Barnett (5%) and Powsfield Limited (95%) were the shareholders in the company.

== See also ==
- HAZ Sport Agency
