= Magnusson =

Magnusson, or Magnússon, is a surname of Scandinavian origin, meaning son of Magnus. It may refer to:

- Anna Magnusson (born 1995), Swedish biathlete
- Arn Magnusson, fictional character created by Jan Guillou
- Árni Magnússon, Icelandic scholar
- Arne Magnusson, fictional character from the Half-Life video game series
- Birger Jarl, or Birger Magnusson of Bjälbo, founder of Stockholm
- Birger of Sweden, or Birger Magnusson, King of Sweden 1284–1318
- Daniel Magnusson (born 1991), Swedish professional ice hockey centre
- Daniel Magnusson (born 2000), Swedish curler
- David Magnusson (1925–2017), Swedish psychologist and professor
- Eggert Magnússon, chairman of West Ham United F.C.
- Eirik II of Norway, King of Norway 1280–1299
- Eiríkr Magnússon, Icelandic scholar
- Emil Magnusson, Swedish athlete
- Erik Magnusson, King of Sweden 1356–1359
- Erik Magnusson (duke) (c. 1282 – 1318), Swedish Duke
- Eskil Magnusson, lawspeaker of Västergötland
- Eystein I of Norway, or Øystein Magnusson, King of Norway 1103–1123
- Finnur Magnússon, Icelandic scholar and archæologist (also known as Finn Magnussen)
- Göran Magnusson (1939–2010), Swedish politician
- Haakon Magnusson of Norway, King of Norway 1093–1094
- Håkon V of Norway, King of Norway 1299–1319
- Håkon VI of Norway, King of Norway 1343–1380
- Hilde Magnusson Lydvo, Norwegian Labour Party politician
- Hörður Magnússon (disambiguation), several people
- Inez Magnusson (1897–1953), Swedish fraudster
- Inge Magnusson, Norwegian pretender to King Sverre Sigurdsson
- Jon Magnusson, Earl of Orkney 1284–c. 1300
- Jón Arnar Magnússon, Icelandic decathlete
- Jón Magnússon (politician), Icelandic politician
- Magnus Magnusson, Earl of Orkney 1273–1284
- Magnus Magnusson, Icelandic/Scottish television presenter, journalist, translator and writer
- Magnús Árni Magnússon (born 1968), Icelandic politician
- Magnús Ver Magnússon, Icelandic powerlifter and World's Strongest Man champion
- Mats Magnusson, Swedish football player
- Olaf Magnusson of Norway, King of Norway 1103–1115
- Olafur Magnússon, Icelandic chess master
- Pandora, Swedish eurodance artist, real name Anneli Magnusson
- Páll Magnússon, president of the RÚV and news anchor for Sjónvarpið
- Per Magnusson, Swedish songwriter
- Princess Christina, Mrs. Magnuson, sister of the current King of Sweden
- Ragnar Magnusson (1901–1981), Swedish long-distance runner
- Sally Magnusson, Scottish broadcaster and writer
- Sigurd I of Norway, King of Norway 1103–1130
- Sigurd Magnusson, Norwegian pretender to King Sverre Sigurdsson
- Skúli Magnússon, Icelandic bailiff
- Thomas Magnusson, Swedish cross-country skier
- Valdemar Magnusson, Duke of Finland

== See also ==
- Árni Magnússon Institute for Icelandic Studies, academic institute in Reykjavík
- Situation Magnusson, a Swedish television program
