= Harðardóttir =

Harðardóttir is an Icelandic surname, meaning daughter of Hörður. Notable people with the surname include:

- Eygló Harðardóttir (born 1972), Icelandic politician
- Manuela Ósk Harðardóttir (born 1983), Icelandic beauty queen and model
- Oddný Guðbjörg Harðardóttir (born 1957), Icelandic politician

== See also ==
- Harðarson, masculine equivalent
