= Harðarson =

Harðarson is an Icelandic surname meaning son of Hörður. In Icelandic names, the name is not strictly a surname, but a patronymic. Notable people with the surname include:

- Bjarni Harðarson (born 1961), Icelandic politician
- Falur Harðarson (born 1968), Icelandic basketball player and coach
- Ísak Harðarson (1956–2023), Icelandic poet and translator
- Jóhannes Harðarson (born 1976), Icelandic football coach and former player
- Kristján Harðarson (born 1964), Icelandic long jumper

Similar name for a daughter is Harðardóttir.
