= Media Sport Investment =

International investment fund

- Founded: 2004
- Defunct: 2008
- Fate: Dissolved
- Key people: Kia Joorabchian

Media Sport Investment Limited (MSI) was a London-based international investment fund that was headed by the Iranian-born, British-educated, businessman Kia Joorabchian. It has attracted considerable attention for its partnership between 2004 and 2007 of Corinthians football club in Brazil, and for its involvement in the 'third-party' ownership of players, notably the Argentinian forward Carlos Tevez.

The source of the money behind MSI was a subject of considerable speculation. Roman Abramovich, owner of Chelsea, was at one time rumored to own a 15% share in the group, while Joorabchian was persistently linked to the oligarch Boris Berezovsky and his associate Badri Patarkatsishvili.

== MSI and Corinthians ==
Media Sport Investment Limited was founded in 2004 in London by Joorabchian and Nojan Bedroud (a FIFA licensed agent) to control Corinthians football department. The agreed 10-year deal stated that MSI would invest $35 million into the club –$20 million of which would cover debts– in return for 51% of profits over the duration of the contract. In the wake of MSI's involvement a stream of new players arrived at the club, players who were engaged to play for Corinthians but whose economic rights were partly or wholly owned by the investment fund. According to the investigation of São Paulo police, MSI not only financed Corinthians but also financed to buy players directly, namely Carlos Tevez (35%), Carlos Alberto (50%) and Sebastián Domínguez (100%). While Nilmar, the labour court of Brazil had cancelled his contract with MSI and Corinthians in 2007. MSI also worked with Global Soccer Agencies bought players for Corinthians, namely Javier Mascherano and Carlos Alberto (another 50%). Marcelo Mattos, which bought by Devita Limited (the company also financed MSI Brasil and Corinthians) also played for Corinthians. Other players such as Rafael Moura, Johnny Herrera and Renato Ribeiro were linked to MSI by Brazil media. The signing of Tevez from Boca Juniors for reported US$22 million (US$16 million plus various fee) in December 2004 was a record for a transfer by a South American club.

The partnership with Corinthians had been the subject of investigation by the Brazilian police, although no wrongdoing was found. In July 2007, however, a Brazilian judge issued arrest warrants for Boris Berezovsky, Joorabchian, Bedroud and four officials of club, including the chairman, Alberto Dualib, on charges of money laundering. MSI Brazil arm, MSI Licenciamentos e Administracao Ltda, received money from Devetia Limited, a BVI company. MSI Licenciamentos was owned by Devetia, MSI Group Limited (formed in 2000 as Exnon Holdings Limited) and Just Sports Inc., (later sold all the shares to MSI Group and Devetia), which Joorabchian was the director of Just Sports and the rest was linked to Berezovsky, Patarkatsishvili and Pini Zahavi. However BVI company act protected the real identity of the ownership.

The federal attorneys Silvio Luis Martins de Oliveira and Rodrigo de Grandis were reported by the Brazilian legal website consultor Juridico as saying that MSI's transactions were "carried out with the use of numerous offshore accounts which have the single and well-known intention of distancing the investor and the illicit origin of the resources from their final destination, in this case the purchase and sale of players".

In July 2007, in the light of the money laundering allegations, Corinthians broke off their association with MSI. Despite winning the league in 2005, there had already been a public breakdown in relations between Corinthians and MSI. The club had seven different coaches in 18 months, including Daniel Passarella, Márcio Bittencourt and Antônio Lopes, and had struggled for form. Joorabchian's involvement with team affairs had come in for criticism and both Tevez and Javier Mascherano had been moved to West Ham United in the English Premier League. In December 2007 Corinthians was relegated to the Brazilian Championship's second division.

The warrant for Joorabchian's arrest was suspended by the Brazilian authorities in August 2008.

In April 2014, The judge totally absolved the whole case saying there was never anything done wrong by anyone in the case at all. "In this case, there is no proof of a single offense, nor is it pointed out that the alleged group ever have had any intention or interest in the committing any crimes," added the judge.

== MSI and West Ham ==
In 2005 MSI was involved in negotiations to take over the English club West Ham United. The plan was abandoned in November of that year when agreement on a valuation of the club could not be reached.

On August 31, 2006, the Corinthians players Javier Mascherano and Carlos Tevez moved to West Ham United. The following day the club announced the opening of "exploratory discussions" over a possible takeover, reportedly by a consortium fronted by Joorabchian and Paul Yeubrey. West Ham in the end accepted a rival bid from investors headed by Eggert Magnússon.

The transfers of Tevez and Mascherano proved highly controversial. In April 2007 West Ham were fined £5.5 million for failing to reveal the full terms of the ownership of the players. In fact MSI retained a percentage of the economic rights to Tevez (through MSI Group Limited, a BVI company), shared with a second company, Just Sports Inc, while Mascherano was owned by Global Soccer Agencies and Mystere Services Ltd. All four companies were represented by Joorabchian who had officially stepped down as president of Media Sport Investment in June 2006. However, according to filing in the Companies House, Joorabchian was remained as the director of England incorporated MSI Ltd. all the time.

== Claim against West Ham United ==
In a compensation claim against West Ham, undertaken in March 2008, Joorabchian claimed that following the Premier League ruling in April 2007 he had brokered a deal between West Ham and Tevez's third-party owners. MSI and Just Sports Inc had initially been reluctant to terminate their ownership arrangement as requested by the Premier League. Joorabchian said that under the terms of the deal West Ham had agreed to pay £4.7 million — later reduced to £4.5 million — to cover costs, the player’s salary, expenses and a loan fee —thereby suggesting that Tevez was paid a salary and expenses beyond that being covered by the club.

Joorabchian further stated that he paid West Ham £2 million to release Tevez's registration so that he could join Manchester United in August 2007 on the understanding that West Ham would return the money with legal costs amounting to £2.6 million. That transfer had itself been subject to a protracted dispute while Joorabchian claimed that MSI and Just Sports Inc retained the economic rights to the player and should therefore receive any fee for the transfer, rather than West Ham as the Premier League insisted. In the end, West Ham received £2 million for the player's registration —the money Joorabchain claimed to have paid West Ham on the understanding that it would be returned.

Joorabchian's claim against West Ham was eventually settled out-of-court with Joorabchian engaged as a consultant by West Ham with fees of more than £2 million.

== Manchester transfers ==
=== Carlos Tevez ===
In August 2007, Carlos Tevez joined Manchester United on a two-year deal in which his registration documents was leased by the club while his economic rights were retained by his third-party owners. Only when he signed for Manchester City in September 2009 was Tevez removed from the third-party ownership of MSI and Just Sports Inc. This deal was reported as being worth £47 million to the companies owning Tevez's economic rights, although that sum was disputed by Joorabchian.

In March 2009 West Ham agreed to pay Sheffield United £20 million over five years in settlement of the case that they had brought against West Ham when the east London club stayed in the Premier League at the end of the 2006–07 season at Sheffield United's expense while playing Tevez, a player they argued should have been ineligible.

=== Jô ===
In June 2008 the transfer of Brazilian player Jô from CSKA Moscow to Manchester City was initially blocked by the Premier League while they investigated his association with MSI and Joorabchian. Jô had played at Corinthians before moving to CSKA Moscow in 2006, signing for the Brazilian side while the club was under the control of MSI. Third-party ownership of players was banned by the Premier League in June 2008.

== See also ==
- Third-party ownership in association football
