= Burdisso =

Burdisso is a surname. Notable people with the surname include:

- Federico Burdisso (born 2001), Italian swimmer
- Guillermo Burdisso (born 1988), Argentine professional footballer
- Nicolás Burdisso (born 1981), Argentine football manager and former player
