= Co-ownership (association football) =

System whereby two football clubs own the contract of a player jointly

Co-ownership is a system whereby two football clubs own the contract of a player jointly, although the player is only registered to play for one club. It is not a universal system, but is used in some countries, including Argentina, Chile and Uruguay. It was formerly commonplace in Italy, though the practice has now been abolished there.

This type of deal differs from third-party ownership, in that in the latter, the player's contract is owned by a non-footballing entity, such as a management company.

== Italy ==
Co-ownership deals were common in Italian football, before being banned at the end of the 2014–15 season. The practice was sanctioned in Article 102 bis of the FIGC Internal Organizational Regulations (Norme Organizzative Interne della FIGC) and were officially known as "participation rights" (diritti di partecipazione).

For a co-ownership to be set, a player needed to be signed to a team and have at least two years left in their contract. It worked as a regular transfer, except that the selling club would keep the aforementioned participation rights, i.e. the rights to 50% of the player's value. Unless the deal was terminated early by mutual agreement between all the parties involved, the two clubs had to agree on whether to renew or terminate the deal at the end of each season. In case they failed to reach an agreement by the league-wide deadline, the issue would be resolved via a blind auction. If the bids happened to be equal, or if none of the clubs submitted one, the full rights to the footballer would go to the club with which the footballer was registered (i.e. the club that acquired the footballer in co-ownership and not the one that kept the participation rights). When a player was under the co-ownership of two teams, he could still be sent on loan to a third side, provided that all the parties involved agreed on the move. The club owning the "rights of participation" was allowed to transfer them to another club, still provided that all the other parties involved agreed.

A practical example of this type of deal was when Brazilian striker Adriano was co-owned by Internazionale and Parma. Parma acquired Adriano for a reported £4 million in May 2002, with Inter keeping the participation rights. Adriano enjoyed a successful spell at Parma, which resulted in Inter paying a reported £13.5 million to buy out Parma's half share in January 2004.

== See also ==
- Transfer (association football)
- Third-party ownership in association football
