= Hörður =

Hörður (Icelandic pronunciation: [ˈhœrðʏr̥]) may refer to:

== People ==
- Hörður Árnason, Icelandic footballer
- Hörður Barðdal, Icelandic water polo player
- Hörður Felixson, Icelandic footballer
- Hörður Magnússon (disambiguation), several people
- Hörður Torfason, Icelandic songwriter
- Hörður Vilhjálmsson, Icelandic basketballer

== Sports ==
- Knattspyrnufélagið Hörður, Icelandic multi-sport club
