= Benfica Stars Fund =

Football investment fund

- Type: Investment Funds
- ISIN: PTYEVLIM0004
- Industry: Association football
- Founded: 30 September 2009
- Defunct: 30 September 2014
- Headquarters: Portugal

Benfica Stars Fund was a football investment fund belonging to Portuguese club Benfica's SAD, a public limited sports company responsible for the financial management of the club's professional football team.

The fund was set up by ESAF – Espírito Santo Fundos de Investimento Mobiliário SA on 30 September 2009. At first the fund had 8,000,000 unit each with €5 each.

== History ==
Benfica Stars Fund was the fourth investment fund of Portuguese football, after First Portuguese Football Players Funds in the 2000s. Moreover, Benfica was the last of the "Big Three" clubs in Portugal to set-up an investment fund. The club sold part of the economic rights of 12 players to the fund, in exchange for cash. If Benfica sold the players, Benfica would give back a percentage of transfer fees received to the fund. In October 2009, S.L. Benfica SAD invested €6 million to the fund, accounted for 15% of total units. The club then sold more players to the fund, made the subscription, in turn became an injection of asset instead of cash.

After the sale of David Luiz in January and Fábio Coentrão in summer 2011, the fund acquired five players from Benfica instead of keeping cash for €6.135 million.

As an asset, the rights were amortized proportionally according to the length of contract (between players and club). Moreover, the fund also bore the admission fee related to player transaction, tax arose, agent fee and FIFA solidarity mechanism (5% of transfer fee distributed to youth clubs) proportionality to the ownership ratio. Thus, to make the fund profitable, the club had to sell the player above the fee that the fund acquired. The club had to ask the fund if the club had to sell the player below the reference price of the fund.

On 31 July 2014, Benfica SAD (which owned 15%) completed the acquisition of Benfica Stars Fund by spending around €28.9 million for 85% (decreased from €34 million in 2009), purchasing the remaining economic rights of nine players (with a valuation of €5,079,437), as well as €21,704,300 deposits and future receivable from bonus clauses.

== Investments ==
Date	Players	Nationality	Percentage	Price	Departed date	Departed team	Departed revenue (adj.)
30 September 2009	David Luiz	Brazil	25%	€4.5M	31 January 2011	(England) Chelsea	€6.25M + €0.5M (value of Matić)
30 September 2009	Ruben Amorim	Portugal	50%	€1.5M	8 September 2014	Bought back	Lump sum
30 September 2009	David Simão	Portugal	25%	€0.375M	31 July 2013	(Portugal) Arouca	€375,000
30 September 2009	Ángel Di María	Argentina	20%	€4.4M	29 June 2010	(Spain) Real Madrid	€5.0M + Bonus
30 September 2009	Javi García	Spain	20%	€3.4M	31 August 2012	(England) Manchester City	€4.0M + Bonus
30 September 2009	Roderick Miranda	Portugal	25%	€2.0M	31 July 2013	(Portugal) Rio Ave	Undisclosed
30 September 2009	Nélson Oliveira	Portugal	25%	€2.0M	8 September 2014	Bought back	Lump sum
30 September 2009	Leandro Pimenta	Portugal	25%	€0.375M	31 July 2013	(Portugal) Gil Vicente	Undisclosed
30 September 2009	José Shaffer	Argentina	40%	€1.4M	27 September 2012	Bought back (Released)	€120,000
30 September 2009	Urreta	Uruguay	20%	€1.2M	8 September 2014	Bought back (Released)	Lump sum
30 September 2009	Miguel Vítor	Portugal	25%	€0.5M	30 June 2013	Released	€0
30 September 2009	Ishmael Yartey	Ghana	25%	€0.375M	19 July 2012	(France) Sochaux	€562,500
10 February 2010	Óscar Cardozo	Paraguay	20%	€4.0M	4 August 2014	(Turkey) Trabzonspor	€1M + bonus
10 February 2010	Fábio Coentrão	Portugal	20%	€3.0M	5 July 2011	(Spain) Real Madrid	€6.0M
10 February 2010	Felipe Menezes	Brazil	30%	€1.5M	31 July 2013	(Brazil) Palmeiras	€1.5M
10 February 2010	Rafik Halliche	Algeria	20%	€0.4M	23 August 2010	(England) Fulham	€511,211
10 February 2010	Maxi Pereira	Uruguay	30%	€1.35M	8 September 2014	Bought back	Lump sum
20 June 2010	Airton	Brazil	40%	€3.0M	8 September 2014	Bought back	Lump sum
20 June 2010	Alan Kardec	Brazil	50%	€3.0M	1 May 2014	(Brazil) São Paulo	€2.25M
30 September 2011	Bruno César	Brazil	15%	€1.035M	21 January 2013	(Saudi Arabia) Al Ahli	€1.035M
30 September 2011	Franco Jara	Argentina	10%	€0.6M	8 September 2014	Bought back	Lump sum
30 September 2011	Nicolás Gaitán	Argentina	15%	€2.025M	8 September 2014	Bought back	Lump sum
30 September 2011	Ezequiel Garay	Argentina	10%	€1.175M	25 June 2014	(Russia) Zenit Saint Petersburg	€600,000
30 September 2011	Nolito	Spain	20%	€1.3M	31 July 2013	(Spain) Celta de Vigo	€1.3M
28 June 2013	Rodrigo	Spain	24%	€3.6M	31 January 2014	(Spain) Valencia	€7.2M
28 June 2013	André Gomes	Portugal	20%	€0.8M	31 January 2014	(Spain) Valencia	€3M
28 June 2013	Filip Đuričić	Serbia	20%	€2.0M	8 September 2014	Bought back	Lump sum
28 June 2013	Miralem Sulejmani	Serbia	25%	€1.25M	8 September 2014	Bought back	Lump sum
	Total			€52.06M			€45,783,148 + undisclosed

== See also ==
- Third-party ownership in association football
