= Bruno Mendes (footballer, born 1994) =

Brazilian footballer

Personal information
- Full name: Bruno Pereira Mendes
- Date of birth: 2 August 1994 (age 32)
- Place of birth: Cruzeiro, Brazil
- Height: 1.84 m (6 ft 0 in)
- Position: Forward

Team information
- Current team: Ratchaburi

Youth career
- 2007–2012: Guarani

Senior career*
Years	Team	Apps	(Gls)
2012	Guarani	19	(4)
2012–2013	Macaé	0	(0)
2012–2013	→ Botafogo (loan)	32	(11)
2014–2026	Deportivo Maldonado	0	(0)
2014	→ Atlético Paranaense (loan)	5	(1)
2014–2015	→ Avaí (loan)	15	(0)
2015–2017	→ Vitória Guimarães B (loan)	61	(13)
2015–2017	→ Vitória Guimarães (loan)	3	(0)
2017–2018	→ Guarani (loan)	52	(18)
2019–2020	→ Cerezo Osaka (loan)	48	(15)
2021	→ Avispa Fukuoka (loan)	20	(4)
2022	→ Cerezo Osaka (loan)	32	(5)
2023–2024	→ Guarani (loan)	47	(9)
2025–2026	→ Vila Nova (loan)	22	(2)
2026–	Ratchaburi	0	(0)

International career
2012–2013	Brazil U20		
- * Club domestic league appearances and goals as of 17 December 2025

Bruno Pereira Mendes (born 2 August 1994), known as Bruno Mendes, is a Brazilian professional footballer who plays as a forward for Ratchaburi.

== Club career ==
Bruno Mendes was born in Cruzeiro, São Paulo, and joined Guarani's youth setup in 2007, aged 12. On 21 January 2012, aged just 17, he made his first team debut by coming on as a second-half substitute in a 2–1 Campeonato Paulista home win against Oeste.

Bruno Mendes scored his first senior goal on 17 March 2012, netting the first in a 2–0 home defeat of Mirassol. He immediately became a starter for the side, scoring four goals in 18 appearances as his side reached the finals but lost to Santos.

In September 2012, Bruno Mendes signed for Botafogo until the end of the following year. Bought outright by HAZ Sport Agency from Guarani for a R$7 million fee, HAZ used Macaé as a proxy to register Bruno Mendes's registration rights. He made his debut for the club on 30 September, replacing Clarence Seedorf late into a 2–0 away loss against Bahia for the Série A championship.

Bruno Mendes scored his first goal for Bota on 14 October 2012, netting the equaliser in a 1–1 away draw against Grêmio. Five days later, he scored a brace in a 3–2 home win against Vasco da Gama, and finished the month with five goals in six matches.

In November 2012, former Guarani player Andrei Frascarelli claimed the club owed him wages and asked the court to grant the rights of Bruno Mendes to him. Eventually Macaé assumed the debt, and paid Andrei R$580,000 to settle the case.

On 15 July 2015, Mendes signed with Portuguese Primeira Liga side Vitória de Guimarães.

== Career statistics ==
As of 13 November 2024

Appearances and goals by club, season and competition
Club	Season	League			State League		National cup		League cup		Continental		Other		Total	
Club	Season	Division	Apps	Goals	Apps	Goals	Apps	Goals	Apps	Goals	Apps	Goals	Apps	Goals	Apps	Goals
Guarani	2012	Série B	1	0	18	4	4	2	—		—		—		23	6
Botafogo (loan)	2012	Série A	8	6	—		—		—		—		—		8	6
Botafogo (loan)	2013	Série A	9	3	15	2	2	0	—		—		—		26	5
Botafogo (loan)	Total		17	9	15	2	2	0	—		—		—		34	11
Atlético Paranaense (loan)	2014	Série A	3	0	2	1	0	0	—		5 (Note: Appearance(s) in Copa Libertadores)	0	—		10	1
Avaí (loan)	2014	Série B	8	0	—		—		—		—		—		8	0
Avaí (loan)	2015	Série A	0	0	7	0	0	0	—		—		—		7	0
Avaí (loan)	Total		8	0	7	0	0	0	—		—		—		15	0
Vitória Guimarães B (loan)	2015–16	LigaPro	33	7	—		—		—		—		—		33	7
Vitória Guimarães B (loan)	2016–17	LigaPro	28	6	—		—		—		—		—		28	6
Vitória Guimarães B (loan)	Total		61	13	—		—		—		—		—		61	13
Vitória Guimarães (loan)	2015–16	Primeira Liga	2	0	—		0	0	0	0	—		—		2	0
Vitória Guimarães (loan)	2016–17	Primeira Liga	1	0	—		0	0	0	0	—		—		1	0
Vitória Guimarães (loan)	Total		3	0	—		0	0	0	0	—		—		3	0
Guarani (loan)	2017	Série B	11	2	—		—		—		—		—		11	2
Guarani (loan)	2018	Série B	25	7	16	9	—		—		—		—		41	16
Guarani (loan)	Total		36	9	16	9	—		—		—		—		52	18
Cerezo Osaka (loan)	2019	J1 League	24	6	—		1	0	5 (Note: Appearance(s) in J.League Cup)	2	—		—		30	8
Cerezo Osaka (loan)	2020	J1 League	24	9	—		—		4	3	—		—		28	12
Cerezo Osaka (loan)	Total		48	15	—		1	0	9	5	—		—		58	20
Avispa Fukuoka (loan)	2021	J1 League	19	4	—		—		1	0	—		—		20	4
Cerezo Osaka (loan)	2022	J1 League	22	3	—		3	2	7	0	—		—		32	5
Guarani (loan)	2023	Série B	33	7	2	0	—		—		—		—		35	7
Guarani (loan)	2024	Série B	6	0	6	2	—		—		—		—		12	2
Guarani (loan)	Total		39	7	8	2	—		—		—		—		47	9
Career total			237	57	66	18	7	2	11	5	5	0	0	0	326	82

== Honours ==
Botafogo

- Campeonato Carioca: 2013

Guarani

- Campeonato Paulista Série A2: 2018

Brazil U20

- 8 Nations Football Challenge: 2012
