= Hörður Barðdal =

Personal information
- Born: May 22, 1946 Reykjavík, Iceland
- Died: August 4, 2009 (aged 63)

Sport
- Sport: Water polo Swimming; Skiing; Golf
- Disability: Polio

Hörður Barðdal (22 May 1946 – 4 August 2009) was a competitive water polo player, competitive swimmer, competitive skier, competitive golfer, and a disabled athlete activist.

== Early life ==
Hörður Barðdal was born on 22 May 1946 to Óli S. Barðdal; director of Seglagerðin; Ægir, and Sesselja Guðnadóttir Barðdal. Óli died in 1983.

At the age of nine, Barðdal contracted polio, which resulted in paralysis. Despite this, he remained active in both his professional and athletic pursuits. His involvement in sports and related activities has been noted in accounts of his career.

== Athletic career ==
During the years 1965–1970, Barðdal played water polo with able athletes with Reykjavík F.C (KR) and won the Reykjavík and Icelandic Championships several times. He was also a coach at the Reykjavík F.C. for a while, where he trained both able and disabled people in swimming. He was one of the first competitive athletes in the Reykjavík's Sport Union for the Disabled (ÍFR) and he competed among other places at the Nordic Championships for the Disabled in 1976 and 1977 in swimming, where he won a bronze and silver medal. He was awarded the first Disabled Athlete of the Year in 1977, and he concluded his swimming career at the 1980 Summer Paralympics in Arnhem, Netherlands.

Barðdal was one of the founders of the Icelandic Sports Associations for the Disabled (ÍF) and was a member of the board of the Association until 1986. Hörður was often a team manager at large sport events, for instance at the 1994 Winter Paralympics in Lillehammer; he was an integral player in the launch of winter sports for the disabled in Iceland. He received the gold award from the Icelandic Sports Association for the Disabled in 1994 for his efforts to promote sports among the disabled.

Barðdal later developed a keen interest in golf. He founded the Icelandic Disabled Golf Association (GSFÍ), in collaboration with the Icelandic Golf Association (GSÍ), and was the president of the board until his death in 2009. GSFÍ holds an annual commemorative tournament for Barðdal. It is a putting tournament open to disabled and non-disabled players. He was also a board member of the European Disabled Golf Association (EDGA), which, in 2010, commissioned the Hordur Barddal Trophy; a unisex award; in his memory.

Barðdal married Bergþóra Sigurbjörnsdóttir in 1968. They had three daughters together: Jóhanna Ingileif, Sesselja Engilráð and Bergþóra Fanney Barðdal. In 1980, Barðdal remarried Soffía Kristín Hjartardóttir. Soffía died in 2007. Hörður's stepson from his marriage with Soffía is Þórður Vilberg Oddsson. They have nine grandchildren in total.

The Hörður Barðdal's Memorial Fund for Disabled Golfers was founded in the summer of 2011 by Barðdal's mother and his three daughters, as well as Kristmann Magnússon, director of Pfaff in Iceland, the Icelandic Sports Association for the Disabled, and the Icelandic Golf Association.
