= Guillermo Burdisso =

Argentine footballer (born 1988)

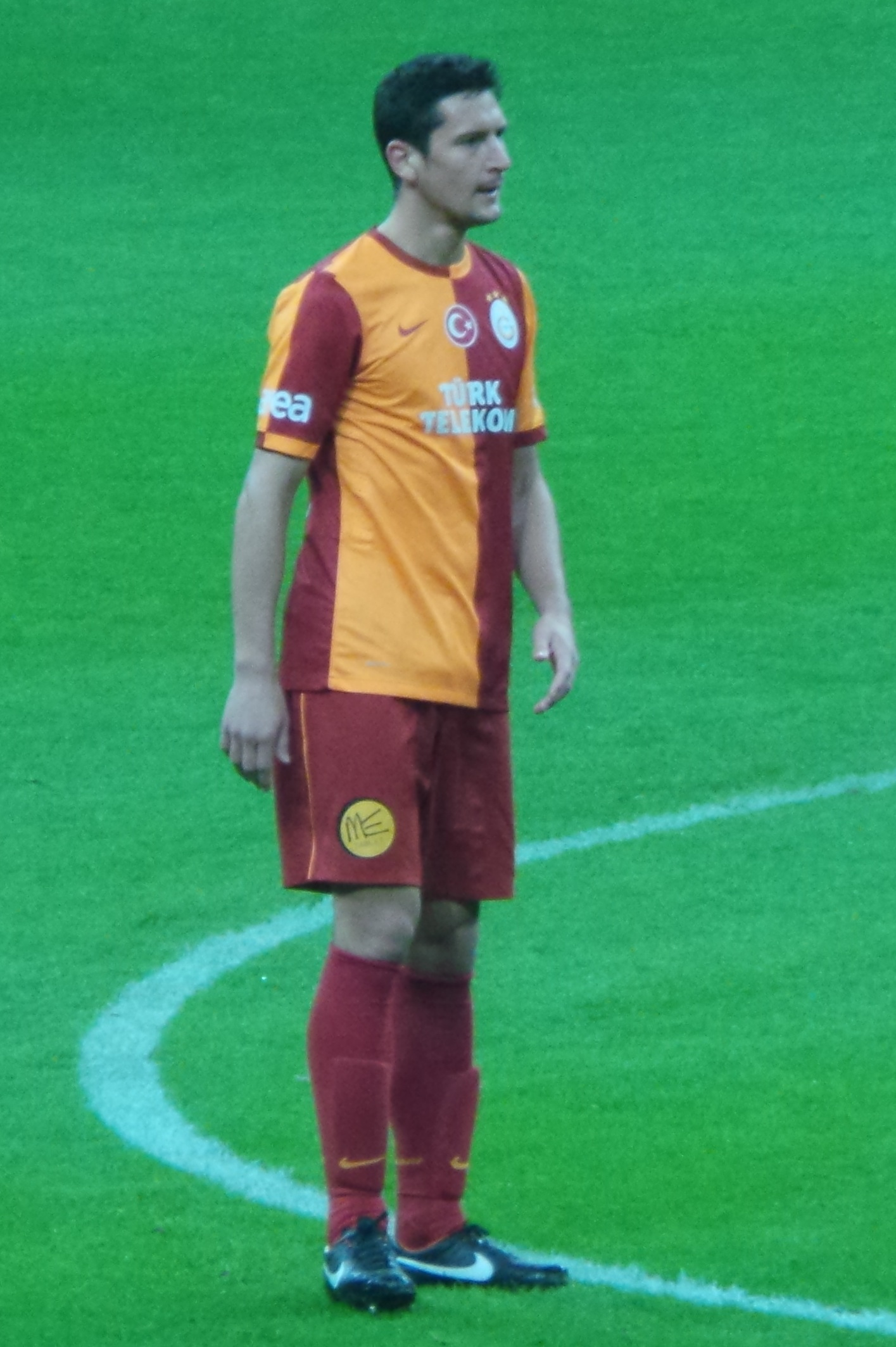
- Burdisso with Galatasaray in 2014

Personal information
- Full name: Guillermo Enio Burdisso
- Date of birth: September 26, 1988 (age 38)
- Place of birth: Altos de Chipión, Córdoba, Argentina
- Height: 1.87 m (6 ft 1 1/2 in)
- Position: Centre-back

Senior career*
| Years | Team | Apps | (Gls) |
| 2005–2006 | El Porvenir | 3 | (2) |
| 2006–2007 | Los Andes | 0 | (0) |
| 2007–2012 | Rosario Central | 46 | (4) |
| 2010–2011 | → Roma (loan) | 4 | (0) |
| 2011–2012 | → Arsenal de Sarandí (loan) | 33 | (6) |
| 2012–2015 | Boca Juniors | 35 | (4) |
| 2014 | → Galatasaray (loan) | 1 | (0) |
| 2015–2018 | Club León | 76 | (6) |
| 2018–2020 | Independiente | 18 | (0) |
| 2020–2022 | Lanús | 34 | (2) |
| 2022 | Deportivo Cali | 22 | (1) |
| 2023 | Universidad Católica | 15 | (0) |
| 2024 | Huracán | 7 | (0) |
| Total | | 294 | (25) |

International career
| 2010 | Argentina | 1 | (1) |
- * Club domestic league appearances and goals as of 18:09, 12 January 2025 (UTC)

Guillermo Enio Burdisso (born 26 September 1988) is an Argentine former professional footballer who played as a defender.

He has spent the majority of his career playing in Argentina, with brief spells in Europe and Mexico. Burdisso won his first and, as of October 2014, only international cap for Argentina in 2010 in which he also scored.

== Career ==
=== Club career ===
Burdisso was born in Altos de Chipión, Argentina. In 2006, he played for Club El Porvenir, then of the Argentine Primera B Nacional. In the summer of 2008, he joined Rosario Central making his professional debut on 27 February 2009 in a 3–1 defeat to Banfield. He also scored his first goal in this appearance.

Burdisso impressed after breaking into the Rosario Central first team in 2009, but he could not prevent the Canallas dropping into the Primera B at the end of the 2010 Clausura. He then joined his brother, Nicolás, at Roma for €500,000 (net of VAT) with option to buy for €4.7 million (net of VAT).

Burdisso joined Arsenal de Sarandí in 2011. In 2012 Boca Juniors bought 25% economic rights each from Rosario Central and third parties HAZ Sport Agency for 3,975,000 and 3,781,875 Argentine pesos, respectively.

On 11 January 2020, Burdisso joined Lanús. After two years in Argentina, it was confirmed on 1 February 2022, that he had returned to Colombia and signed with Deportivo Cali.

In 2023, he played for Chilean side Universidad Católica.

After a year at Huracán, he announced his retirement in early 2025.

=== International career ===
Burdisso made his debut for the Argentina national team on 26 January 2010 in a 3–2 win over Costa Rica. He scored Argentina's second goal in the match.

=== International goals ===
Scores and results list Argentina's goal tally first.

| No. | Date | Venue | Opponent | Score | Result | Competition | Ref. |
|---|---|---|---|---|---|---|---|
| 1. | 26 January 2010 | Estadio Ingeniero Hilario Sánchez, San Juan, Argentina | Costa Rica | 2–1 | 3–2 | Friendly | |

== Personal life ==
Guillermo is the younger brother of former defender Nicolás Burdisso.

== Honours ==
Arsenal

- Argentine Primera División (1): 2012 Clausura

Galatasaray

- Turkish Cup (1): 2013–14
