= Jonathan Barnett (sports agent) =

British football agent

Jonathan Ian Barnett (born 28 January 1950) is a former British football agent and founder of the Stellar Group management company. In 2019, Forbes named him the world's most powerful sports agent.

== Career ==
Barnett founded the Stellar Group talent agency in 1992, with cricket player Brian Lara among his first clients. Barnett went on to represent some of the world's best football players, including Jack Grealish, Gareth Bale, Saul Niguez, Ruben Loftus-Cheek and Jordan Pickford. Barnett brokered the £85.3 million move of Bale to Real Madrid from Tottenham Hotspur and is credited with bringing Lennox Lewis into the boxing world.

The Stellar Group was acquired by ICM Partners in 2020, which was in turn acquired by the Creative Artists Agency (CAA) in 2022. Barnett retired as a sports agent in 2024.

== Regulatory and legal issues ==
In 2006, Barnett was banned by the Football Association for 12 months and fined £100,000 for arranging a secret rendezvous between his client Ashley Cole and Chelsea F.C..

In June 2025, Barnett was sued, along with CAA, in California by a woman who alleged Barnett trafficked her from Australia to the UK in 2017, tortured and sexually assaulted her more than 39 times over six years and made repeated threats to the lives of her and her children; Barnett has denied these allegations.

== Personal life ==
Barnett is Jewish and is a member of St John's Wood synagogue. He is married and has three children. He is a supporter of Arsenal F.C.
