= Marinho (footballer, born 1976) =

Brazilian footballer

Personal information
- Full name: Mario Custódio Nazaré
- Date of birth: 1 April 1976 (age 50)
- Place of birth: Santos, SP, Brazil
- Height: 1.85 m (6 ft 1 in)
- Position: Central defender

Youth career
- 1995: Portuguesa Santista

Senior career*
Years	Team	Apps	(Gls)
1996	Portuguesa Santista	?	(?)
1996–1999	Guarani (SP)	52	(3)
2000–2001	Grêmio	45	(2)
2002	Beşiktaş	1	(0)
2002–2003	Ponte Preta	22	(1)
2004	Atlético (PR)	36	(3)
2005–2008	Corinthians	91	(5)
2008–	Ponte Preta	?	(?)
- * Club domestic league appearances and goals

Mário Custódio Nazaré (born 1 April 1976), or simply Marinho, is a Brazilian former professional footballer who played as a central defender. In 2002, he joined Turkish club Beşiktaş, having agreed an 18-month contract. His contract was terminated just 15 days later, with Marinho having made a substitute appearance.

== Honours ==
Grêmio

- Campeonato Gaúcho: 2001
- Copa do Brasil: 2001

Corinthians

- Campeonato Brasileiro Série A: 2005
