= Hörður Magnússon =

Hörður Magnússon may refer to:

- Hörður Björgvin Magnússon (born 1993), Icelandic footballer
- Hörður Magnússon (footballer, born 1966), Icelandic footballer
