= Marcelo Mattos =

Brazilian footballer (born in 1984)

Personal information
- Full name: Marcelo Mendonça de Mattos
- Date of birth: 10 February 1984 (age 42)
- Place of birth: Indiaporã, Brazil
- Height: 1.79 m (5 ft 10 1/2 in)
- Position: Defensive midfielder

Youth career
- 1997–1998: Mirassol

Senior career*
Years	Team	Apps	(Gls)
1999–2001	Mirassol	133	(5)
2002	FC Tokyo	1	(0)
2002	→ Oita Trinita (loan)	1	(3)
2003–2004	São Caetano	71	(1)
2005–2007	Corinthians	72	(12)
2007–2011	Panathinaikos	62	(5)
2009–2010	→ Corinthians (loan)	8	(0)
2010–2011	→ Botafogo (loan)	20	(1)
2011–2015	Botafogo	71	(0)
2015	Vitória	10	(0)
2016–2019	Vasco da Gama	36	(2)
2019	Santa Cruz	2	(0)
2020	Dom Bosco	3	(0)
2020–2021	Bangu	19	(0)
Total		509	(29)
- * Club domestic league appearances and goals

Marcelo Mendonça de Mattos or simply Marcelo Mattos (born 10 February 1984) is a Brazilian former football defensive midfielder.

He is known for his positioning, tight marking of the opposing player and the ability to bring the ball forward to other offensive players.

== Career ==
Marcelo was born in Brazil where he began at Mirassol a third division club in Brazil he then left for FC Tokyo in the J1 League. After exceptional performances he transferred to Associação Desportiva São Caetano where he then left for Sport Club Corinthians Paulista. At Corinthians, Marcelo established himself where he excelled alongside Carlos Tevez and Javier Mascherano being dubbed the team of the year after the trio won the Championship.

He was part of the Brazilian team that played at the FIFA U-17 World Championship 2001. At that time he was with Mirassol and impressed so much that FC Tokyo signed him.

Marcelo Mattos has signed for Greek team Panathinaikos for 3 million euros on 6 July 2007 in a 4-year deal. In July 2008, Panathinaikos acquired the 85% of the players ownership for a fee of 3 million Euros. The rest of the player's percentage belongs to his agent, Pini Zahavi.

On 26 August 2009 Corinthians announced a one-year loan deal with Panathinaikos.

On 20 July 2010 he was announced as a player of Botafogo. On 3 July 2011 he was sold to Botafogo for 1 million Euros

== Club statistics ==
Club performance			League	
Season	Club	League	Apps	Goals
Japan			League	
2002	FC Tokyo	J1 League	1	0
2002	Oita Trinita	J2 League	1	0
Brazil			League	
2003	São Caetano	Série A	31	0
2004	São Caetano	Série A	40	1
2005	Corinthians Paulista	Série A	35	6
2006	Corinthians Paulista	Série A	29	4
2007	Corinthians Paulista	Série A	8	2
Greece			League	
2007/08	Panathinaikos	Super League	27	1
2008/09	Panathinaikos	Super League	14	0
Brazil			League	
2009	Corinthians Paulista	Série A		
2010	Corinthians Paulista	Série A		
Country	Japan		2	0
Country	Brazil		143	13
Country	Greece		41	1
Total			186	14

== Honours ==
=== Club ===
São Caetano

- Campeonato Paulista: 2004

Corinthians

- Campeonato Brasileiro Série A: 2005

Botafogo

- Campeonato Carioca: 2013

=== Individual ===
- Campeonato Brasileiro Série A Team of the Year: 2005
- Bola de Prata: 2005
