= Roger Flores (Brazilian footballer) =

Brazilian footballer

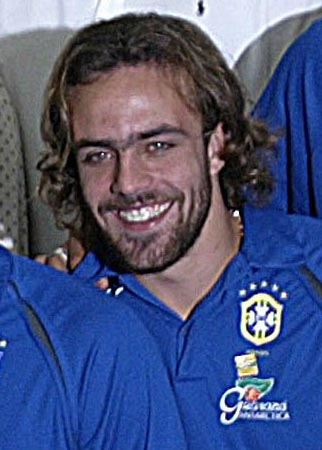

Personal information
- Full name: Roger Galera Flores
- Date of birth: 17 August 1978 (age 48)
- Place of birth: Rio de Janeiro, Brazil
- Height: 1.70 m (5 ft 7 in)
- Position: Attacking midfielder

Youth career
- Fluminense

Senior career*
Years	Team	Apps	(Gls)
1996–2000	Fluminense	47	(8)
2000–2005	Benfica	36	(6)
2001–2002	→ Fluminense (loan)	17	(5)
2004	→ Fluminense (loan)	33	(5)
2005–2007	Corinthians	58	(11)
2007	→ Flamengo (loan)	15	(2)
2008	→ Grêmio (loan)	8	(3)
2008–2009	Qatar SC	20	(4)
2009	→ Al-Sailiya (loan)	9	(2)
2010–2012	Cruzeiro	57	(6)
Total		300	(52)

International career
2000	Brazil U23	6	(1)
2004	Brazil	1	(2)
- * Club domestic league appearances and goals

Roger Galera Flores (born 17 August 1978), also known as just Roger, is a Brazilian football pundit for TV Globo and retired footballer who played as an attacking midfielder.

He was regarded a talented left-footed player who excelled with his dribbling, technique, passing range and strong shot.

== Career ==
Born in Rio de Janeiro to a Brazilian father and a Trinidadian mother, Flores started his professional career with Fluminense under coach Carlos Alberto Parreira in 1999. He was the main player in the team's Brazilian Série C winning campaign, and was the symbol of the restructuring of the club. Parreira once compared him to Diego Maradona, for having a similar style. After a relatively successful campaign in the regular series for 2000, in which the team ultimately finished 10th in points, he was involved in a discussion at halftime in the 2nd leg quarter-final playoff game against São Caetano at the Maracanã, presumably because he was subbed off the field, and left the stadium. Fluminense ended up losing that game and being eliminated from the playoffs. They did, however, get to stay in the Serie A for 2001 with their 10th place finish in the João Havelange regular series.

In 2004 Flores played for Brazil, in a friendly match against Haiti. He scored two goals as Brazil won 6–0. He also played for the Brazil U-23 team in the 2000 Olympics football tournament. Roger was also eligible for the Trinidad and Tobago national football team.

Roger Flores was transferred to the Portuguese club Benfica for a brief six-month period in 2001 for a reported US$6 million. However, he did not adjust and returned to Fluminense (on loan) only 6 months after the transaction. He returned to Benfica in 2002. In 2004, he returned to Fluminense once again but did not play as well as the previous years.

In 2005, Flores was acquired by Corinthians for a reported US$7 million. In late October 2005, he broke his leg in a 1–1 tie with Vasco da Gama which knocked him out for the rest of the Championship. He has since recovered from the injury and has been playing again since January 2006.

On 13 July 2007, CR Flamengo signed the player on a six-month loan contract.

On 17 January 2008, Roger signed a contract with Grêmio Football Porto Alegrense. In July, Roger signed a contract with Qatar Sports Club, and left Grêmio.

On 4 February 2010, Roger left the Middle East and signed a contract with Cruzeiro to play Copa Libertadores football.

== Nicknames ==
During his stint in Corinthians Flores received the nickname "Chinelinho" for missing an excessive number of matches due to injuries. He stated almost having participated in Havaianas ads as a playful response.

== Honours ==
=== Club ===
Fluminense

- Taça Rio 1998
- Brazilian League – Serie C 1999
- Campeonato Carioca 2002

Benfica

- Taça de Portugal: 2003–04
- Supertaça de Portugal 2005

Corinthians

- Brazilian League 2005

Cruzeiro

- Campeonato Mineiro: 2011

=== Individual ===
- Bola de Prata: 2001
- Campeonato Brasileiro Série A Team of the Year: 2005
