= Eggert Magnússon =

Icelandic businessman (born 1947)

Eggert Magnússon (born 20 February 1947) is an Icelandic businessman and former president of the Football Association of Iceland and ex-chairman of West Ham United. Eggert is a former owner and CEO of an import/export and bread and biscuit manufacturing company.

== Brief football history ==
Eggert was president of the Football Association of Iceland (KSÍ), and was an important voice on the UEFA Executive Committee as a representative of one of UEFA's smaller member associations, but had to resign due to the takeover of West Ham United FC.

Eggert was elected to the UEFA Executive Committee in April 2002, after previous membership of the Licensed Match Agents panel (1992–94). Fair Play Committee (1994–96) and Club Competitions Committee (1996–2002). Eggert contributes to the development of women's football as the Executive Committee's representative on the Women's Football Committee, also Eggert is a member of the Clubs and Leagues Working Group.

== Takeover of West Ham United ==
=== Takeover ===
On 21 November 2006, West Ham announced that they had reached an agreement with a consortium headed by Eggert for the sale of the club, worth £85m.

=== Manager change ===
After a run of bad results Eggert sacked manager Alan Pardew on 11 December 2006, replacing him with Alan Curbishley.

=== Change of duties ===
On 18 September 2007, it was announced that Eggert would step down as executive chairman but would still retain the role as club non-executive chairman overseeing a new management structure, and would keep his stake in the club. Shortly after the change, on 13 December 2007, it was announced that Eggert had left West Ham and that his 5 per cent holding had been bought by club majority owner Björgólfur Guðmundsson.
