= Javier Mascherano =

Argentine football manager and former player (born 1984)

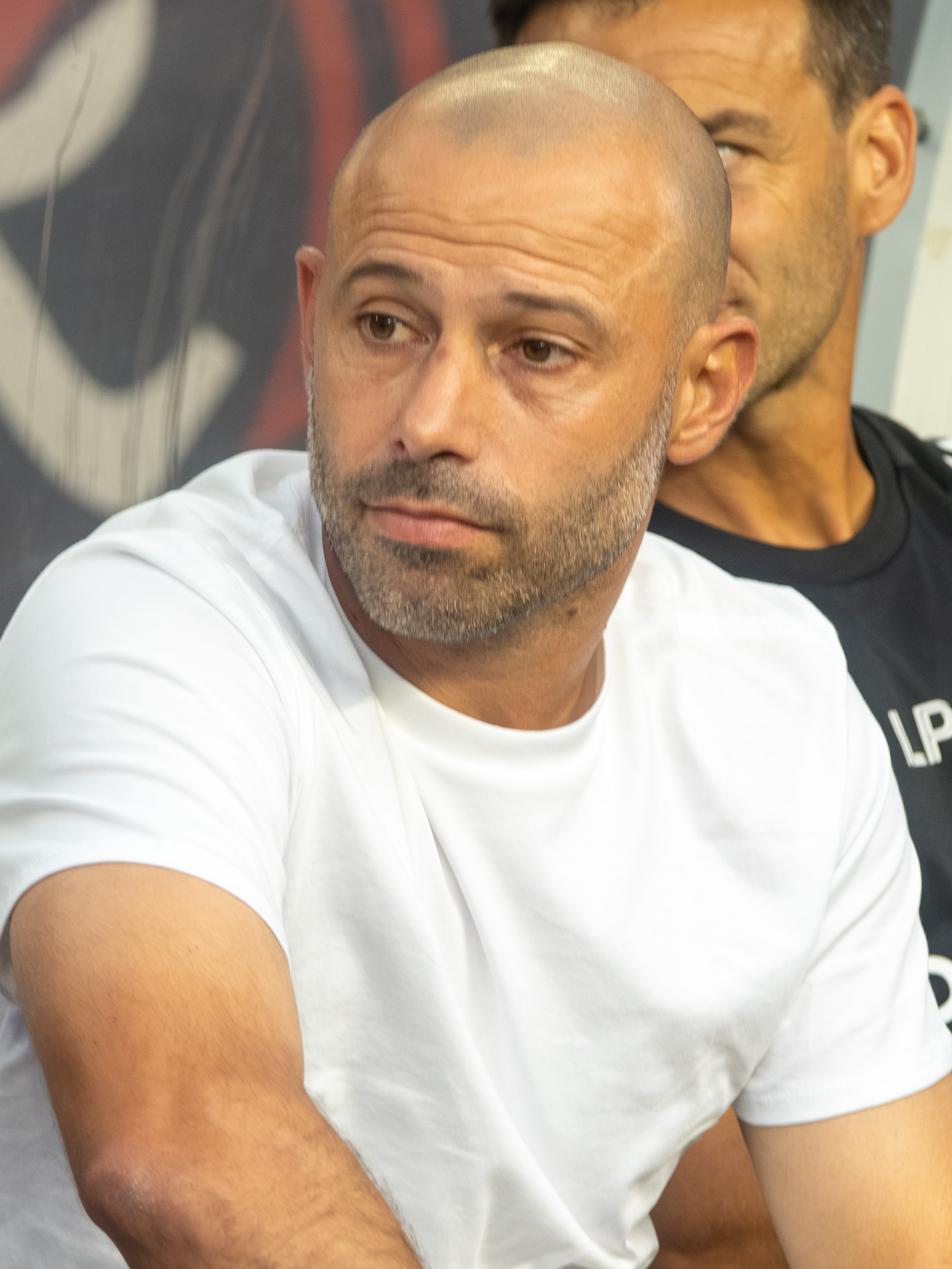
- Mascherano with Inter Miami in 2025

Personal information
- Full name: Javier Alejandro Mascherano
- Date of birth: 8 June 1984 (age 42)
- Place of birth: San Lorenzo, Argentina
- Height: 1.74 m (5 ft 9 in)
- Positions: Centre-back; defensive midfielder

Youth career
- Cerámica San Lorenzo
- Barrio Vila
- 1996–1999: Club Renato Cesarini
- 1999–2003: River Plate

Senior career*
Years	Team	Apps	(Gls)
2003–2005	River Plate	46	(0)
2005–2006	Corinthians	25	(0)
2006–2007	West Ham United	5	(0)
2007–2010	Liverpool	94	(1)
2010–2018	Barcelona	203	(1)
2018–2019	Hebei China Fortune	53	(1)
2019–2020	Estudiantes	10	(0)
Total		436	(3)

International career
2001–2002	Argentina U17	12	(1)
2003–2004	Argentina U20	22	(1)
2005	Argentina U21	5	(1)
2004–2008	Argentina Olympic	20	(0)
2003–2018	Argentina	147	(3)

Managerial career
- 2022–2024: Argentina U20
- 2023–2024: Argentina U23
- 2024–2026: Inter Miami
Medal record
Men's football
Representing Argentina
Olympic Games
Gold medal – first place	2004 Athens	Team
Gold medal – first place	2008 Beijing	Team
CONMEBOL Pre-Olympic Tournament
Winner	2004 Chile
South American U-20 Championship
Winner	2003 Uruguay
FIFA World Cup
Runner-up	2014 Brazil
Copa América
Runner-up	2004 Peru
Runner-up	2007 Venezuela
Runner-up	2015 Chile
Runner-up	2016 United States
- * Club domestic league appearances and goals

Javier Alejandro Mascherano (Spanish: [xaˈβjeɾ aleˈxandɾo mastʃeˈɾano], Italian: [maskeˈraːno]; born 8 June 1984) is an Argentine football manager and former player who was most recently the head coach of Major League Soccer club Inter Miami. As a player, he played as a centre-back or defensive midfielder, most notably for Liverpool, Barcelona and the Argentina national team, being heralded as one of the best defenders and midfielders of his generation.

Mascherano began his career at River Plate, where he earned his first senior honours, the Argentine Primera División, in the 2003–04 season. He moved to Brazilian side Corinthians in 2005, winning the Brazilian Série A that same year, and then joined West Ham United in the Premier League; however, his brief time with the Hammers was blighted by unusual contract terms with Global Soccer Agencies. At the beginning of 2007, Mascherano was loaned out to Liverpool and reached the UEFA Champions League final. Afterwards, his deal was made permanent for £18.7 million. He left for Barcelona in 2010, winning five La Liga titles, two Champions Leagues and two FIFA Club World Cups among other honours, in eight years. He ended his career in 2020 after spells at Hebei China Fortune and Estudiantes.

Mascherano made 147 appearances for the Argentina national team and is the second most capped player in the country's history (after Lionel Messi). From his debut in 2003 until his retirement in 2018, he represented the nation at five Copa América tournaments, finishing runner-up in 2004, 2007, 2015, and 2016, and four FIFA World Cups, reaching the 2014 final. He twice won a gold medal at the Summer Olympics, in 2004 and 2008, becoming the first male footballer to achieve this double feat since Hungarian defender Dezső Novák in 1968. Between 2008 and 2011, Mascherano served as the captain of Argentina.

Mascherano began working as a manager in 2022, with the Argentina under-20 and under-23 teams, coaching the latter at the 2024 Olympics. At the end of 2024 he was appointed by Inter Miami, where he won the MLS Cup in 2025.

== Club career ==
=== River Plate ===
Born in San Lorenzo, Santa Fe, Mascherano came through the youth ranks at River Plate in Buenos Aires, Argentina. However, before making his club debut he made his name representing Argentina.

Mascherano won his first silverware when River won the 2003–04 Clausura championship. In the 2004 Copa Libertadores River reached the semi-final, but lost on penalties to arch-rivals Boca Juniors. Around this time several clubs including Real Madrid, and Deportivo La Coruña declared an interest in signing Mascherano, but River Plate turned down all offers, saying that none of the interested parties were prepared to pay enough.

2004–05 was not a successful season for River, finishing third in the Apertura Championship and only tenth in the Clausura. In the Copa Libertadores River again lost in the semi-final, this time to São Paulo. After the Confederations Cup in Germany, Brazilian club Corinthians acquired Mascherano from River Plate for US$15 million.

=== Corinthians ===
The Brazilian Série A runs from April, so Mascherano joined Corinthians mid-season. After playing only nine games for his new club, in September 2005, Mascherano fractured his left foot, causing him to miss the end of the season. He returned to Argentina to be operated on by the national team doctor and recuperate. Corinthians, however, still won the Série A title with Mascherano's compatriot, Carlos Tevez, as captain.

In total, Mascherano was out of action for six months, only returning on 5 March 2006. Corinthians were forced to start their 2006 Copa Libertadores without Mascherano, but he returned in time for the Round of 16 tie against River Plate, which the Timão lost. The 2006 Brazilian Série A also went badly for Corinthians – at one point, they were even battling relegation. In June, the league was interrupted for the 2006 FIFA World Cup.

Although his performances in both Brazil and Germany drew the attention of European clubs, Mascherano stated his desire to remain with Corinthians to help with their relegation battle and postponed any transfer until January at the earliest. Hours before the summer transfer window of 2006 closed in Europe, however, he joined West Ham United alongside Tevez for an undisclosed fee.

=== West Ham United ===
Throughout the summer of 2006, Mascherano was linked with top clubs around Europe; he stated he would relish playing in Spain for Real Madrid or Barcelona. Serie A side Juventus was also interested in him, but he came with Carlos Tevez to West Ham United instead. There were many rumours about the surprise nature of Mascherano and Tevez's transfers, primarily regarding Media Sports Investment's interest in buying out the club and whether they truly owned the two players, or whether a third party held their registration, and also that if a high enough (£112 million was touted) offer was received, West Ham would be forced to sell. (It has since been discovered that Mystere Services and Global Soccer Agencies are the companies that owned Mascherano.)

Before Mascherano joined, West Ham had won, drew and lost one game each. Upon his arrival, however, the Hammers went into free-fall, losing eight times and drawing once in all competitions before their next win on 29 October. During this time, Mascherano rarely featured in the squad despite their struggles, prompting rumours about financial clauses related to the amount of time he actually played. In October, national team coach Alfio Basile stated that he hoped Mascherano would leave West Ham "as soon as possible" and join Juventus.

On 16 January 2007, Liverpool requested clearance from FIFA to take Mascherano on loan from West Ham. FIFA's rules state that no player can play for more than two clubs between 1 July and 30 June the following year, as Mascherano had already played for both Corinthians and West Ham during that time.

FIFA approved the deal on 31 January 2007. However, although Liverpool submitted his registration details before the midnight transfer deadline, the Premier League did not immediately announce whether it would allow Mascherano to play for Liverpool, saying that it wanted to "take time to satisfy itself with the proposed arrangements".

In a further development, it was announced on 2 March that the Premier League were charging West Ham with breaking rule B13, concerning acting in good faith, and rule U18, which concerns the influence of third-party ownership. On 27 April, the Premier League issued West Ham a world-record fine of £5.5 million.

=== Liverpool ===
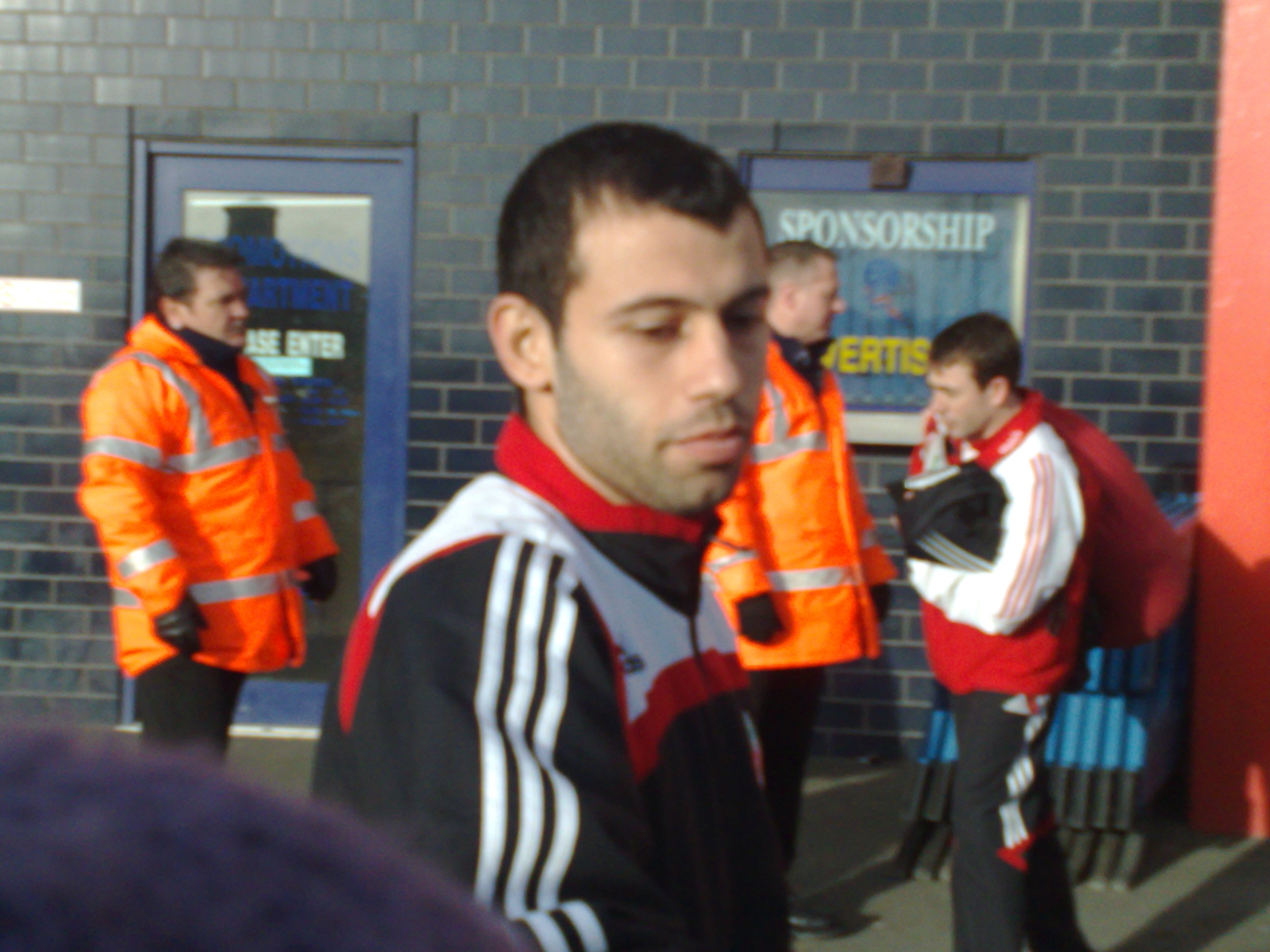
Mascherano with Liverpool in 2008

On 10 February 2007, Liverpool added Mascherano to their UEFA Champions League squad and gave him the number 20 shirt. Eventually, on 20 February 2007, Mascherano's move to Liverpool became official after the Premier League accepted Liverpool's request to register the player at Anfield.

Mascherano made his debut for Liverpool against Sheffield United on 24 February 2007, and was praised by the Liverpool manager Rafael Benítez and team captain Steven Gerrard after Liverpool's 4–0 victory. After playing in a match against Arsenal on 31 March, Benítez called Mascherano a "monster of a player". Similarly, his teammates were impressed by his talent; Xabi Alonso noted how mature a player he was for his age, saying, "He has a cool mind on the pitch. He is analysing and thinking about the game in each moment." Mascherano's first Champions League appearance came in the quarter-final first leg away to PSV Eindhoven on 3 April. Hastily establishing himself as a starter at the club, Mascherano played in the Champions League final that year against Milan. He and teammate Alonso were successful in stifling the creative play of both Kaká and Clarence Seedorf for much of the match but Liverpool eventually succumbed to Milan, losing 2–1 at the Olympic Stadium in Athens. He was voted Liverpool's man of the match by the fans on the official Liverpool website.

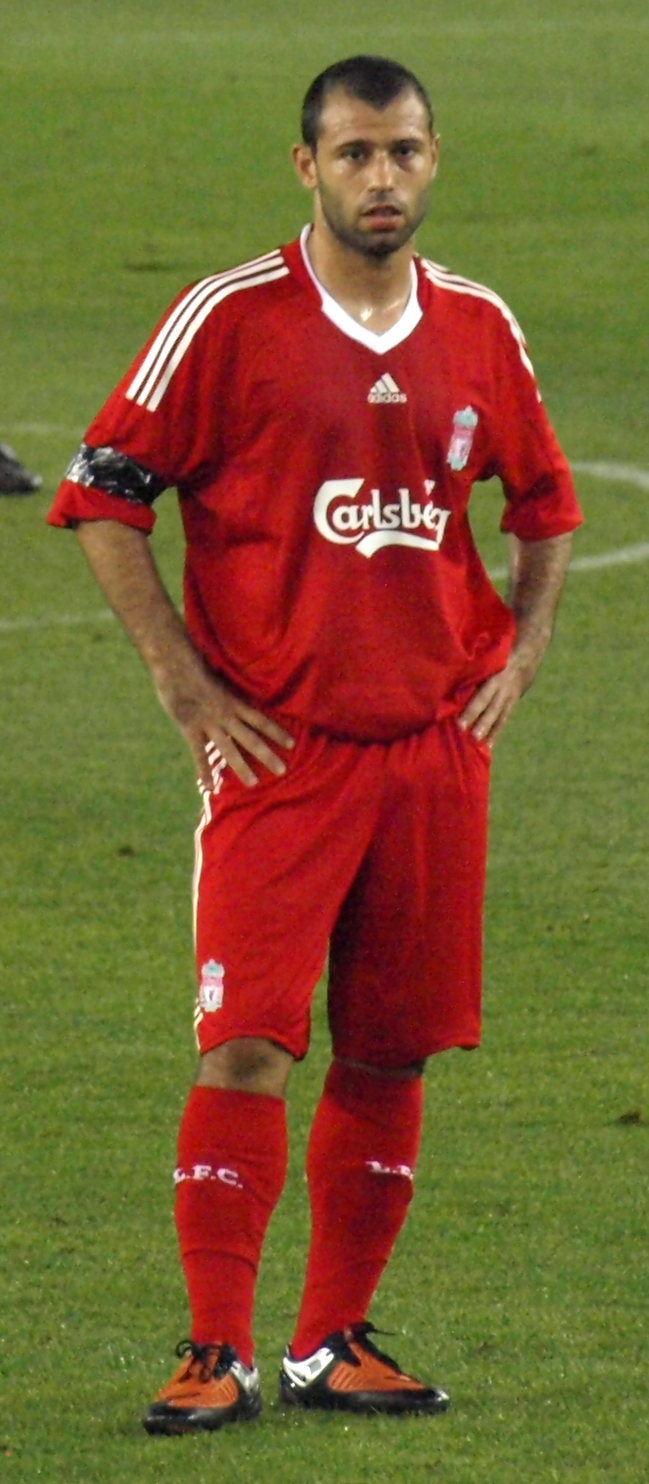
Mascherano playing for Liverpool in 2009

Following months of speculation, Mascherano signed a four-year permanent contract with Liverpool on 29 February 2008, ending his association with Media Sports Investments. The transfer reportedly cost Liverpool £18.6 million, and covered not only the transfer fee, but also the player's wages for the four-year deal. It was allowed to go through immediately as Mascherano was not contracted to another club, making him exempt from the rules of the transfer window. He scored his first Premier League and Liverpool goal on 15 March 2008, with a 20-yard strike against Reading.

On 29 November 2009, Mascherano claimed the first goal in the 2–0 win against Everton at Goodison Park when his 30-yard shot appeared to be heading just off target before it took a wicked deflection off Joseph Yobo before finding the net. The goal officially went down as an own goal. In a match against Portsmouth on 19 December 2009, Mascherano was sent off for committing a bad foul on Tal Ben Haim. It was later confirmed that the sending off meant a four-match suspension for Mascherano. This was due to this being his second red card of the season, Liverpool went on to lose the match 2–0. Mascherano had the worst disciplinary record of the 2009–10 Premier League season with seven yellow cards and two red. He scored his first goal of the season with a bullet of a shot from outside the area in the UEFA Europa League against Unirea Urziceni away from home in a match Liverpool won 3–1 to secure their place in the round of 16 of the competition with an aggregate win of 4–1.

On 27 July 2010, after returning from a break after the 2010 FIFA World Cup, Mascherano informed new Liverpool manager Roy Hodgson that he wanted to leave the club. During that break, Hodgson had failed with several attempts to contact Mascherano, able only to leave messages for him saying that he was looking forward to meeting him back on Merseyside as his calls went unreturned.

Mascherano was held in high esteem by the Liverpool fans, who gave him his own song, (to the tune of the White Stripes' "Seven Nation Army"). After winning the 2011 UEFA Champions League final with Barcelona against Manchester United, Mascherano, speaking directly after the match, said, "I want to say, I know that Liverpool supporters, after my exit, I know they were a little bit sad with me—this is for them as well."

Liverpool announced on 27 August that they had agreed a £17.25 million transfer fee with Barcelona for the player and had given permission for him to speak with the Spanish club.

==== 2008 Old Trafford incident ====
In his first game at Old Trafford against Manchester United on 23 March 2008, Mascherano was sent off after collecting two yellow cards. He was initially booked for a late tackle on Paul Scholes, and later dismissed for running towards referee Steve Bennett to protest a yellow card shown to Fernando Torres. Mascherano had to be pushed from the field of play by Steven Gerrard and Xabi Alonso. Rafael Benítez was forced to leave the dugout and plead with Mascherano to leave the field, and he was escorted down the tunnel by Peter Crouch. The Football Association ruled that the usual one-game suspension be increased to three games for improper conduct. Mascherano admitted the improper conduct charge levelled at him, but appealed the further two-to-three-match suspension. This appeal was denied by the FA, however, and Mascherano was also fined £15,000; he demanded that this fine would be paid to a charity.

With the controversial incident behind him, Mascherano would play a role in Liverpool's 2–1 win over Manchester United at Anfield on 13 September 2008, although he was at fault for failing to cover countryman Carlos Tevez, who scored for United less than three minutes into the game. Mascherano made amends for his mistake, and was instrumental in creating the goal which put Liverpool 2–1 up. Mascherano was voted Man of the Match by the fans on Liverpool's official website.

=== Barcelona ===
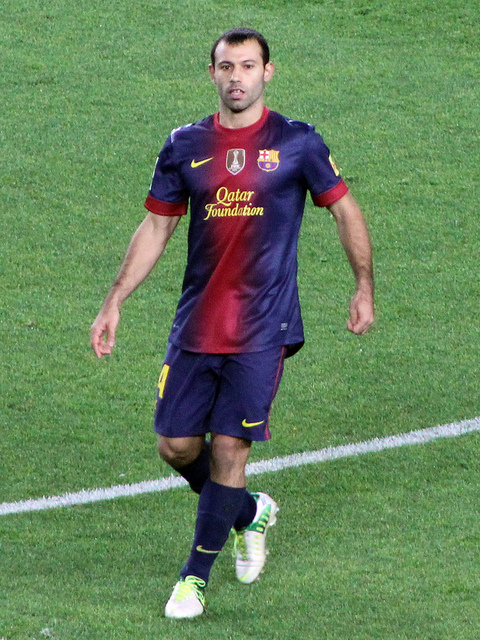
Mascherano playing for Barcelona in 2012

On 28 August 2010, Mascherano agreed terms on a four-year contract with Barcelona for €24 million. On 30 August 2010, Mascherano passed his medical to complete his transfer and told Barça TV, "The truth is it's a dream, it's a great joy." He made his league debut on 11 September 2010, starting in a 0–2 home defeat against recently promoted Hércules, marking the first defeat at the Camp Nou in 16 months. Mascherano had a mixed season at the Camp Nou, spending the first half of the season mainly coming off the bench but for the latter part playing out of position in a centre-back role. On 28 May 2011, Mascherano started alongside Gerard Piqué in the 2011 UEFA Champions League final against Manchester United at the Wembley Stadium. Barcelona went on to win the game 3–1, with Mascherano dedicating the win to Liverpool fans, some of which he had upset during his move. In the run to the final, Mascherano denied Arsenal's Nicklas Bendtner a certain goal with a sliding tackle towards the end of the second leg of the round of 16 match, with the Catalan giants beating the Gunners 3–1, 4–3 on aggregate.

In the 2011–12 season, Mascherano played almost exclusively as a centre-back, putting in consistent performances starting regularly for Barcelona in defence.

On 26 July 2012, Mascherano signed a contract extension, keeping him with the Blaugrana until 2016. His buyout clause was set at €100 million. On 7 June 2014, Mascherano signed an extension on his contract, tying him to the Catalan club until 2018 and keeping his buyout clause at €100 million.

On 6 June 2015, Mascherano started in the 2015 UEFA Champions League final, as the club won it's fifth Champions League title by defeating Juventus 3–1 at Berlin's Olympiastadion. This made Barcelona the first club in history to win the treble of domestic league, domestic cup and European Cup/Champions League twice.

Upon club captain Xavi's departure in 2015, Mascherano was named the 4th captain of Barcelona for the 2015–16 season behind Andrés Iniesta, Lionel Messi and Sergio Busquets. On 27 July 2016, Mascherano signed a new contract with Barcelona, which would keep him at the club until 2019.

On 26 April 2017, Mascherano scored his first and only goal for Barcelona, a penalty–kick in a La Liga match against Osasuna. On 23 January 2018, Barcelona announced that Mascherano would leave the club after seven-and-a-half seasons.

=== Hebei China Fortune ===
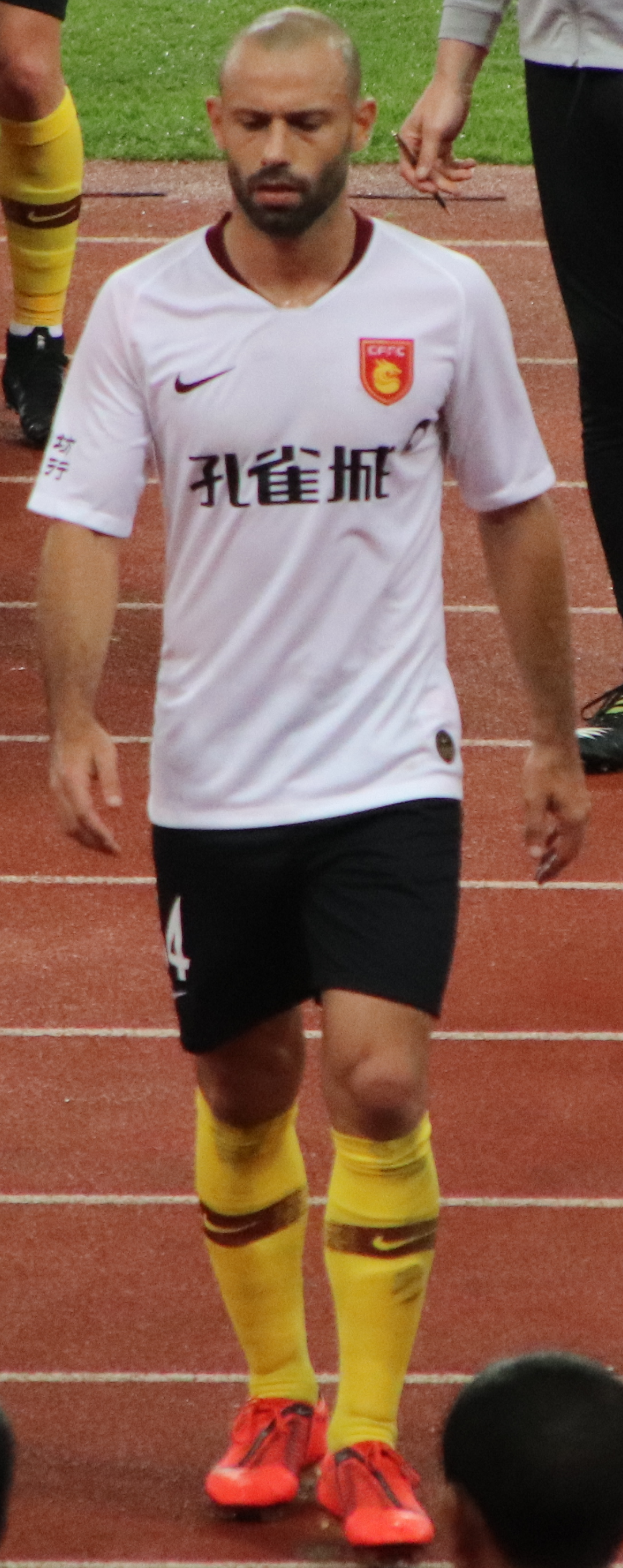
Mascherano playing for Hebei China Fortune in 2019

On 24 January 2018, Chinese Super League side Hebei China Fortune announced the signing of Mascherano for €5.5 million, which would be effective 2 days later. He scored his first goal for the club in a Chinese FA Cup match against Shandong Luneng Taishan on 2 May 2018.

=== Return to Argentina and retirement ===
On 23 November 2019, it was announced that Mascherano would be joining Argentine club Estudiantes in January 2020 on a free transfer. He made his official debut in a league match against San Lorenzo on 25 January 2020, which ended in a 1–1 draw.

On 15 November 2020, Mascherano announced his retirement from professional football.

== International career ==
Mascherano's first international appearance came in 2001. September of that year saw him play on the Argentina team that finished fourth in the 2001 FIFA U-17 World Championship. In June 2003, he played at the Toulon Tournament, becoming the competition's best player as Argentina's under-20s finished 3rd.

Mascherano's impact at youth levels was such that he made his senior international debut before playing a single minute for River Plate's first team (due to his central midfield position at club level being occupied by River's long standing captain Leonardo Astrada, nicknamed the Chief). That international debut came in a friendly against Uruguay on 16 July 2003.

Halfway through the 2003–04 Apertura championship, Mascherano was called up to play in the 2003 FIFA World Youth Championship. Argentina again finished fourth with Mascherano the team's outstanding player. He was however suspended for the third place play-off.

In January 2004, Mascherano joined up with Argentina U23 for the South American Pre-Olímpico tournament in Chile. Argentina won the tournament, thereby qualifying for the 2004 Summer Olympics. In August, Mascherano and the team went on to become gold medal-winners in Greece.

At the end of the 2003–04 season, Mascherano was included in the Argentina senior squad for the 2004 Copa América. Argentina lost to Brazil on penalties in the final, but Mascherano impressed enough to be voted Argentina's player of the tournament by his teammates.

In the 2006 FIFA World Cup, Mascherano played every minute of every match for Argentina, with the team being eliminated by Germany in the quarter-finals.

His first two goals for the senior Argentina team came in July 2007 during the 2007 Copa América. On 5 July, he scored the only goal in Argentina's final group stage match against Paraguay, which saw them finish in first place in their group with nine points. On 8 July, he scored a goal in a 4–0 victory over Peru in the quarter-finals. Argentina went on to reach the final of the tournament, where they suffered a 3–0 defeat to Brazil on 15 July. Mascherano's outstanding performance at the tournament saw him widely selected as the best Argentine player in a squad full of stars.

On 8 June 2008, Mascherano received his first red card for the national team after receiving two yellow cards in a match against the United States. He was sent off in the 86th minute of the match, which finished 0–0.

Later that year, Mascherano was selected to represent Argentina under-23 squad at 2008 Olympic Games in Beijing as an overage player. He was thrilled at the call-up, saying, "It's important for any athlete to defend the gold medal. I might be the only person from my country ever to do it and I'll go down in history." Argentina won the tournament, making Mascherano the first Argentine sportsman ever to win two Olympic gold medals.

Soon after being appointed head coach of Argentina in November 2008, Diego Maradona announced that he wanted Mascherano to be the team's captain. "I want Mascherano to be my captain because I believe he is the Argentinian player who is closest to the idea I have about the Argentinian shirt – sweat for it, sacrifice for it, being a professional, being close to the team-mate," Maradona said. "I will convince him. He will be my captain."

Mascherano was appointed the new Argentina captain on 10 November, replacing Javier Zanetti. At the 2010 FIFA World Cup, Argentina was captained by Lionel Messi, who became Argentina's youngest World Cup captain and reached the quarter-finals where they were again eliminated by Germany, 4–0. He only missed the last match of the group stage against Greece.

Mascherano captained Argentina during the 2011 Copa América on home soil, but the team were defeated by Uruguay at the quarter-final stage. On 30 August 2011, Mascherano was replaced as Argentina captain by Lionel Messi, who was appointed to the role by new manager Alejandro Sabella. Mascherano became vice-captain in the national squad.

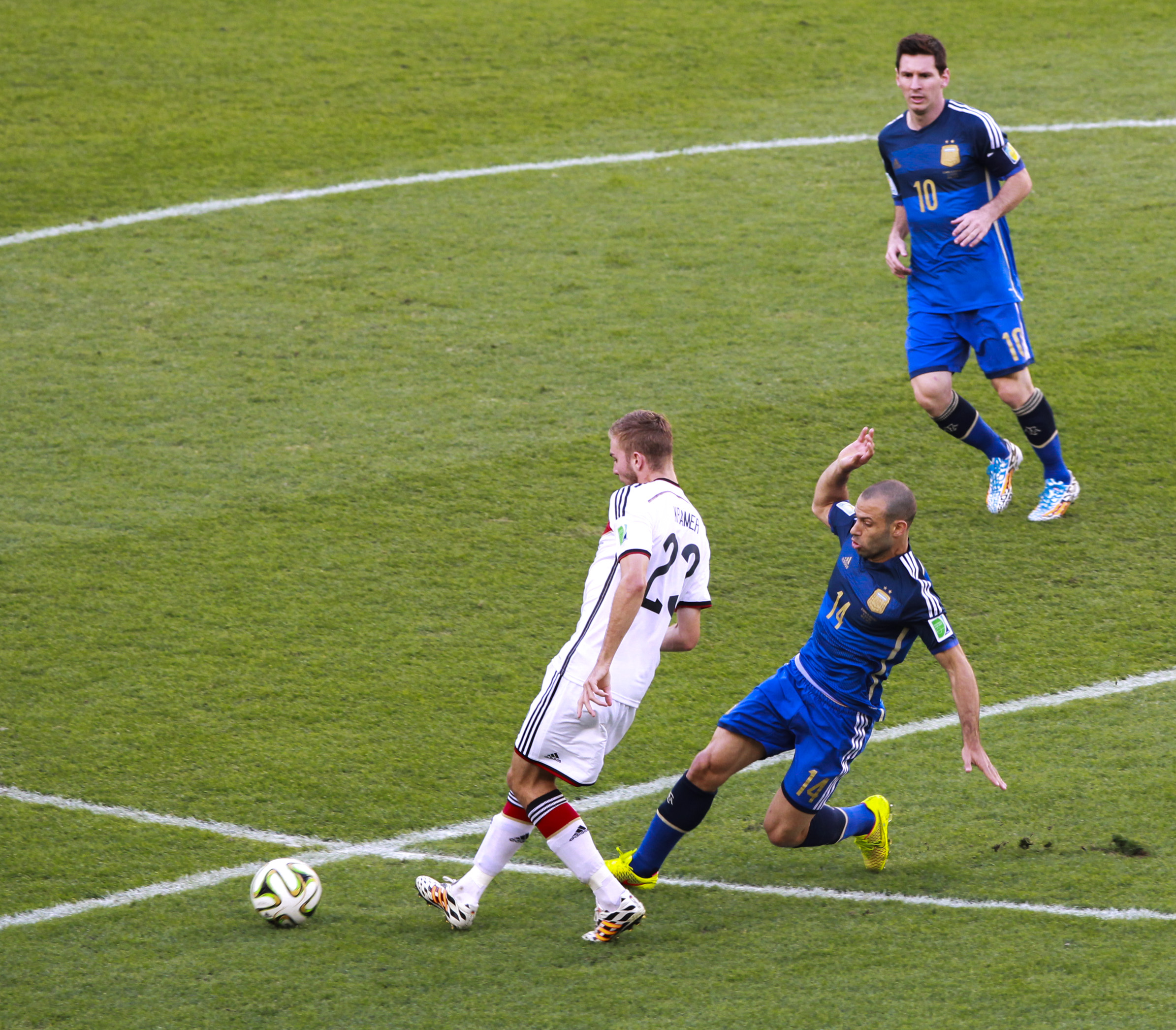
Mascherano going in for a tackle against Germany's Christoph Kramer in the 2014 FIFA World Cup final

In the 2014 FIFA World Cup, Mascherano played his 100th international match for Argentina in a match against Iran, which la Albiceleste won 1–0. During the tournament, Messi wore the captain's armband and commentators often described the team as Messi plus ten other players, however Mascherano was the squad's de facto leader and midfield general. Mascherano asserted himself vocally, especially during the knockout rounds, where the media described him as Argentina's best player after Messi's prolific scoring stagnated after the group stage. During Argentina's World Cup semi-final against the Netherlands, Mascherano was knocked unconscious by a header contested by Georginio Wijnaldum and was led off the pitch with a suspected concussion, although he resumed play moments later. In stoppage time, Mascherano tore his anus making a goal-saving slide tackle on Arjen Robben. Argentina would go on to advance to the final in a penalty shootout, with goalkeeper Sergio Romero saving kicks from Ron Vlaar and Wesley Sneijder. Thanks to Mascherano's prowess as a defensive midfielder and leader, Argentina entered the final having not conceded a goal in 330 minutes during elimination games, as well as never having trailed in the tournament.

On 11 July 2014, Mascherano was named on the ten-man shortlist for FIFA's Golden Ball award for the tournament's best player. He recorded the most tackles of any player at the tournament (30) and the third-most passes (576 at a success rate of 89%), playing in every minute of Argentina's campaign. In the final, Argentina lost 1–0 to Germany after extra time, with Mario Götze scoring in the 113th minute.

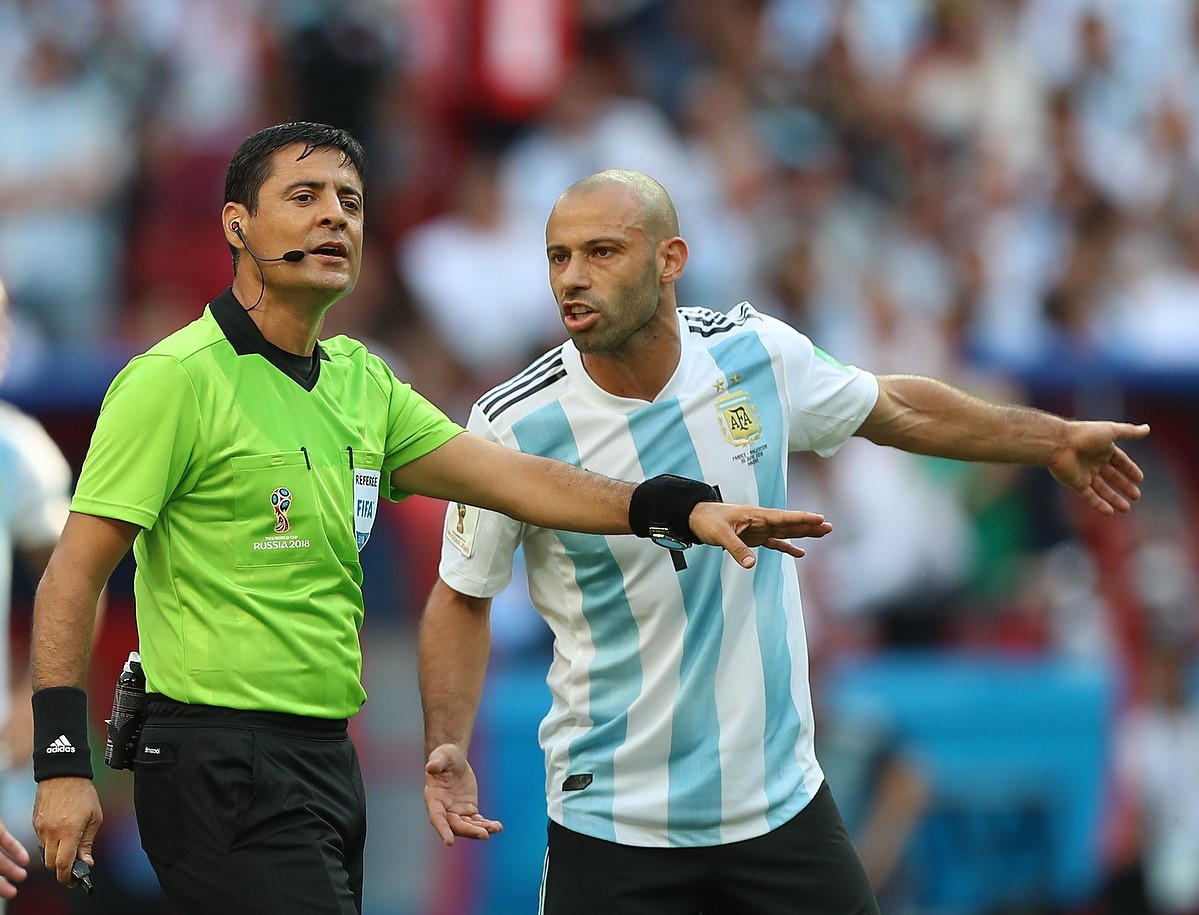
Mascherano playing for Argentina at the 2018 FIFA World Cup

On 21 May 2018, Mascherano was named in Jorge Sampaoli's final 23-man squad for the 2018 FIFA World Cup in Russia. He earned his 143rd cap in a 4–0 friendly win against Haiti on 29 May 2018, equaling Javier Zanetti's record for the most appearances for Argentina. His 144th cap came in Argentina's opening match at the World Cup, a 1–1 draw against Iceland on 16 June 2018, thus becoming the sole most capped player in the country's history.

On 30 June 2018, following Argentina's elimination from the World Cup after a 4–3 loss against France in the Round of 16, Mascherano announced his retirement from international football, having obtained 147 caps and scored 3 goals for his country.

== Coaching career ==
=== Argentina ===
In December 2021, Mascherano was named manager of the Argentina under-20 team, taking over the side in early January. He led the under-23 team at the 2024 Summer Olympics, where Argentina was eliminated in the quarterfinals.

=== Inter Miami ===
On 26 November 2024, Major League Soccer side Inter Miami appointed Mascherano as their new head coach, on a contract lasting until the end of 2027. He reunited with his former Barcelona and Argentina teammate Lionel Messi. Mascherano faced accusations that he was only hired due to connections to Messi and fellow Camp Nou veterans Jordi Alba, Luis Suárez and Sergio Busquets; he responded: "People in the world can have their opinion … but I am convinced that I am capable of coaching the team".

On Mascherano's debut on 19 February 2025, the club won 1–0 away to Sporting Kansas City in the CONCACAF Champions Cup first round with a goal by Messi; Mascherano criticised the "inhumane" decision to play the game in temperatures below -20 degrees Celsius in the midwestern city. Three days later, the league campaign began with a 2–2 home draw against New York City FC. Having qualified for the 2025 MLS Cup playoffs, his team won the Eastern Conference with a 5–1 victory over NYCFC on 29 November, following it a week later with a 3–1 win against Vancouver Whitecaps in MLS Cup 2025. After winning the trophy, he reflected that there had been a lot of pressure on him due to what he conceded were poor results during his previous roles with the Argentine youth teams.

On 14 April 2026, Mascherano resigned as Inter Miami's head coach due to personal reasons.

== Style of play ==
Nicknamed "El Jefecito" ("The Little Chief"), Mascherano was a versatile, hard-working, and tactically intelligent footballer, with an excellent ability to read the game and organise his team; he was known in particular for his leadership skills, passing accuracy, energy, positional sense, tough marking of opponents, and hard-tackling style of play, despite his relatively small physical stature. Considered as one of the best defenders and defensive midfielders of his generation, although he has primarily served as either a holding midfielder or central defender throughout his career, he has also been deployed as a right-back or even as a box-to-box or central midfielder on occasion. Regarding Mascherano's playing style, Jonathan Wilson noted in a 2013 article for The Guardian that the Argentine was an example of a type of holding midfielder that he dubbed a destroyer, who "clattered about making tackles and collecting bookings, his role almost entirely of regaining possession and distributing it simply."

== Personal life ==
On 29 October 2015, Mascherano admitted two counts of fraud totalling just over €1.5 million having failed to declare €1.5 million in earnings in 2011 and 2012. On 21 January 2016, he appeared in court in an attempt to avoid imprisonment for the offences, and was fined €800,000. He was sentenced to one year in prison for evasion of tax payments. The sentence was suspended and resulted in no jail time served, provided he did not offend again during the suspended sentence.

== Career statistics ==
=== Club ===
Club	Season	League			National cup (Note: Includes Copa do Brasil, FA Cup, Copa del Rey Chinese FA Cup, Copa Argentina)		League cup (Note: Includes Football League Cup)		Continental		Other		Total	
Club	Season	Division	Apps	Goals	Apps	Goals	Apps	Goals	Apps	Goals	Apps	Goals	Apps	Goals
River Plate	2003–04	Primera División	21	0	—		—		13	0	—		34	0
River Plate	2004–05	Primera División	25	0	—		—		12	1	—		37	1
River Plate	Total		46	0	—		—		25	1	—		71	1
Corinthians	2005	Série A	7	0	0	0	—		0	0	1	0	8	0
Corinthians	2006	Série A	10	0	2	0	—		5 (Note: Appearances in Copa Libertadores)	0	8 (Note: Appearances in Campeonato Paulista)	0	25	0
Corinthians	Total		17	0	2	0	—		5	0	9	0	33	0
West Ham United	2006–07	Premier League	5	0	0	0	0	0	2 (Note: Appearances in UEFA Cup)	0	—		7	0
Liverpool	2006–07	Premier League	7	0	0	0	0	0	4 (Note: Appearances in UEFA Champions League)	0	—		11	0
Liverpool	2007–08	Premier League	25	1	2	0	1	0	13	0	—		41	1
Liverpool	2008–09	Premier League	27	0	3	0	0	0	8	0	—		38	0
Liverpool	2009–10	Premier League	34	0	0	0	1	0	13 (Note: Five appearances in UEFA Champions League, eight appearances and one goal in UEFA Europa League)	1	—		48	1
Liverpool	2010–11	Premier League	1	0	—		—		—		—		1	0
Liverpool	Total		94	1	5	0	2	0	38	1	—		139	2
Barcelona	2010–11	La Liga	27	0	7	0	—		11	0	—		45	0
Barcelona	2011–12	La Liga	31	0	6	0	—		10	0	5 (Note: Two appearances in Supercopa de España, one appearance in UEFA Super Cup, two appearances in FIFA Club World Cup)	0	52	0
Barcelona	2012–13	La Liga	25	0	6	0	—		8	0	2 (Note: Appearances in Supercopa de España)	0	41	0
Barcelona	2013–14	La Liga	28	0	7	0	—		9	0	2	0	46	0
Barcelona	2014–15	La Liga	28	0	7	0	—		12	0	—		47	0
Barcelona	2015–16	La Liga	32	0	6	0	—		8	0	5 (Note: Two appearances in Supercopa de España, one appearance in UEFA Super Cup, one appearance in FIFA Club World Cup)	0	51	0
Barcelona	2016–17	La Liga	25	1	5	0	—		8	0	2	0	40	1
Barcelona	2017–18	La Liga	7	0	2	0	—		2	0	1	0	12	0
Barcelona	Total		203	1	46	0	—		68	0	17	0	334	1
Hebei China Fortune	2018	Chinese Super League	26	0	1	1	—		—		—		27	1
Hebei China Fortune	2019	Chinese Super League	27	0	0	0	—		—		—		27	0
Hebei China Fortune	Total		53	0	1	1	—		—		—		54	1
Estudiantes	2019–20	Primera División	7	0	1	0	—		—		—		8	0
Estudiantes	2020–21	Primera División	3	0	—		—		—		—		3	0
Estudiantes	Total		10	0	1	0	—		—		—		11	0
Career total			428	2	55	1	2	0	138	2	26	0	649	5

=== International ===
Argentina
Year	Apps	Goals
2003	1	0
2004	10	0
2005	3	0
2006	8	0
2007	14	2
2008	9	0
2009	10	0
2010	10	0
2011	13	0
2012	8	0
2013	9	0
2014	15	1
2015	12	0
2016	13	0
2017	6	0
2018	6	0
Total	147	3

International goals

No.	Date	Venue	Opponent	Score	Result	Competition
1.	5 July 2007	Estadio Metropolitano de Fútbol de Lara, Barquisimeto, Venezuela	Paraguay	1–0	1–0	2007 Copa América
2.	8 July 2007	Estadio Metropolitano de Fútbol de Lara, Barquisimeto, Venezuela	Peru	4–0	4–0	2007 Copa América
3.	4 June 2014	Estadio Monumental Antonio V. Liberti, Buenos Aires, Argentina	Trinidad and Tobago	2–0	3–0	Friendly

== Managerial statistics ==
As of match played 11 April 2026

Managerial record by team and tenure
Team	From	To	Record				
Team	From	To	P	W	D	L	Win %
Argentina U20	1 January 2022	26 November 2024	29	18	3	8	62.1
Argentina U23	1 July 2023	26 November 2024	21	10	7	4	47.6
Inter Miami	26 November 2024	14 April 2026	67	37	16	14	55.2
Total			117	65	26	26	55.6

== Honours ==
=== Player ===
River Plate

- Argentine Primera División: 2003–04 Clausura

Corinthians

- Campeonato Brasileiro Série A: 2005

Liverpool

- UEFA Champions League runner-up: 2006–07

Barcelona

- La Liga: 2010–11, 2012–13, 2014–15, 2015–16, 2017–18
- Copa del Rey: 2011–12, 2014–15, 2015–16, 2016–17, 2017–18; runner-up: 2010–11, 2013–14
- Supercopa de España: 2011, 2013, 2016
- UEFA Champions League: 2010–11, 2014–15
- UEFA Super Cup: 2011, 2015
- FIFA Club World Cup: 2011, 2015

Argentina U20

- South American Youth Championship: 2003

Argentina U23

- Olympic gold medal: 2004, 2008
- CONMEBOL Pre-Olympic Tournament: 2004

Argentina

- FIFA World Cup runner-up: 2014
- Copa América runner-up: 2004, 2007, 2015, 2016

Individual

- Copa América Team of the Tournament: 2007, 2011, 2015, 2016
- UEFA Champions League Squad of the Season: 2014–15
- Barcelona Player of the Season (Trofeo Aldo Rovira): 2013–14
- Barça Players' Award: 2014–15
- FIFA FIFPro Men's World XI 3rd team: 2015
- FIFA FIFPro Men's World XI 4th team: 2014
- FIFA FIFPro Men's World XI 5th team: 2016, 2017
- Toulon Tournament Best Player: 2003
- South American Team of the Year: 2004, 2005
- IFFHS CONMEBOL Team of the Decade: 2011–2020

=== Manager ===
Inter Miami

- MLS Eastern Conference: 2025
- MLS Cup: 2025

Argentina U20

- L'Alcúdia International Football Tournament: 2022

== See also ==
- List of men's footballers with 100 or more international caps
