= Carlos Alberto (footballer, born December 1984) =

Brazilian footballer (born 1984)

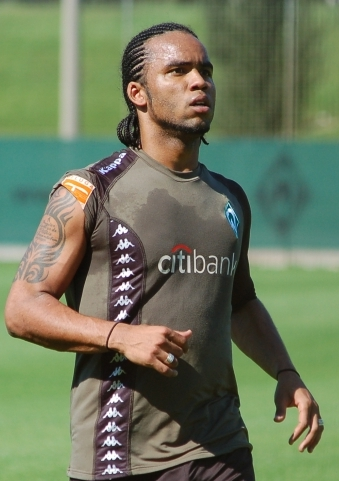
- Carlos Alberto training with Werder Bremen in 2007

Personal information
- Full name: Carlos Alberto Gomes de Jesus
- Date of birth: 11 December 1984 (age 41)
- Place of birth: Rio de Janeiro, Brazil
- Height: 1.75 m (5 ft 9 in)
- Positions: Attacking midfielder; forward

Youth career
- 2000–2001: Fluminense

Senior career*
| Years | Team | Apps | (Gls) |
| 2002–2003 | Fluminense | 43 | (5) |
| 2004–2005 | Porto | 22 | (2) |
| 2005–2007 | Corinthians | 47 | (10) |
| 2007 | → Fluminense (loan) | 5 | (1) |
| 2007–2010 | Werder Bremen | 2 | (0) |
| 2008 | → São Paulo (loan) | 0 | (0) |
| 2008 | → Botafogo (loan) | 23 | (6) |
| 2009–2010 | → Vasco da Gama (loan) | 26 | (9) |
| 2010–2013 | Vasco da Gama | 39 | (3) |
| 2011 | → Grêmio (loan) | 0 | (0) |
| 2011 | → Bahia (loan) | 19 | (0) |
| 2014 | Goiás | 0 | (0) |
| 2014 | Botafogo | 13 | (0) |
| 2015–2016 | Figueirense | 22 | (6) |
| 2017 | Atlético Paranaense | 3 | (0) |
| 2019 | Boavista SC | 0 | (0) |
| Total | | 264 | (42) |

International career
| 2003–2005 | Brazil | 5 | (0) |
- * Club domestic league appearances and goals

Carlos Alberto Gomes de Jesus (born 11 December 1984), commonly known as just Carlos Alberto, is a Brazilian football pundit and retired footballer who played as an attacking midfielder, but who could also play as a second striker. He was known for his technique, dribbling ability, balance on the ball and two-footedness.

== Career ==
Carlos Alberto started his career with Fluminense, where he won the Campeonato Carioca in 2002. He moved on to Porto under coach José Mourinho in January 2004. There, he won the Portuguese Championship and the UEFA Champions League, where he scored the first goal in the 3–0 win over Monaco in the final match.

In the beginning of 2005, he moved to Corinthians who signed a partnership with MSI, where he won the Brasileirão in 2005 being one of the major players of the team. In 2006 Corinthians did poorly in all competitions and Carlos Alberto lost a lot of room in the team and after a long fight with Corinthians manager Emerson Leão, which peaked at a Copa Sul-Americana game against Lanús. He stated he would never again play in Corinthians as long as Leão remained as manager. He was loaned out to Fluminense from January to December 2007, being the team captain in their Copa do Brasil title.

Carlos Alberto joined Bundesliga club Werder Bremen in July 2007 with a deal of reported €7.8 million which was a club record. He signed a four-year contract. The move did not work out for either club or player however, as he suffered with insomnia, and returned to Brazil on numerous loan spells.

In January 2008 he was loaned out to São Paulo but he was excluded from the squad for disciplinary reasons in April 2008 three months before his contract ended. In May 2008, he signed another loan contract with Botafogo until June 2009 but on 12 November 2008, he left the club because of outstanding salary payments. On 7 January 2009, he was loaned out yet again, this time to Vasco da Gama for six months until 30 June 2009. Later he signed for another year on loan with Vasco da Gama. In June 2010 his contract with Werder Bremen was mutually terminated. He signed a three-year contract with Vasco da Gama until June 2013.

On 14 January 2015, Carlos Alberto joined Emirati club Al Dhafra on a one-year contract. 15 days later, however, the move collapsed and he returned to Brazil.

On 24 April 2015, he joined Figueirense along with Felipe.

On 13 January 2017, he signed a one-year contract with Atlético Paranaense.

In 2019, after being without a club for a year, Carlos Alberto joined Boavista playing in the Campeonato Carioca.

In June 2019, he announced his retirement.

== Career statistics ==
=== Club ===
Appearances and goals by club, season and competition
| Club | Season | League | | | Cup | | Continental | | State League | | Other | | Total | |
| Club | Season | Division | Apps | Goals | Apps | Goals | Apps | Goals | Apps | Goals | Apps | Goals | Apps | Goals |
|---|---|---|---|---|---|---|---|---|---|---|---|---|---|---|
| Fluminense | 2002 | Série A | 11 | 0 | 0 | 0 | — | | 2 | 0 | 2 (Note: Appearances in Copa dos Campeões.) | 0 | 15 | 0 |
| Fluminense | 2003 | Série A | 32 | 5 | 5 | 1 | 3 (Note: Appearances in Copa Sudamericana.) | 1 | 4 | 1 | — | | 44 | 8 |
| Fluminense | Total | | 43 | 5 | 5 | 1 | 3 | 1 | 6 | 1 | 2 | 0 | 59 | 8 |
| Porto | 2003–04 | Primeira Liga | 12 | 1 | 3 | 2 | 7 (Note: Appearances in UEFA Champions League.) | 1 | — | | 0 | 0 | 22 | 4 |
| Porto | 2004–05 | Primeira Liga | 10 | 1 | 0 | 0 | 4 | 0 | — | | 3 (Note: One appearance in Supertaça Cândido de Oliveira, one appearance in UEFA Super Cup and one appearance in Intercontinental Cup) | 0 | 17 | 1 |
| Porto | Total | | 22 | 2 | 3 | 2 | 11 | 1 | — | | 3 | 0 | 39 | 5 |
| Corinthians | 2005 | Série A | 30 | 8 | 6 | 0 | 5 | 0 | 7 | 2 | — | | 48 | 10 |
| Corinthians | 2006 | Série A | 17 | 2 | 0 | 0 | 11 (Note: Seven appearances in Copa Libertadores, four appearances in Copa Sudamericana.) | 0 | 2 | 0 | — | | 30 | 2 |
| Corinthians | Total | | 47 | 10 | 6 | 0 | 16 | 0 | 9 | 2 | — | | 78 | 12 |
| Fluminense | 2007 | Série A | 5 | 1 | 7 | 2 | — | | 1 | 0 | — | | 13 | 3 |
| Werder Bremen | 2007–08 | Bundesliga | 2 | 0 | 1 | 0 | 2 | 0 | — | | — | | 5 | 0 |
| São Paulo | 2008 | Série A | 0 | 0 | 0 | 0 | 3 (Note: Appearances in Copa Libertadores.) | 0 | 10 | 1 | — | | 13 | 1 |
| Botafogo | 2008 | Série A | 23 | 6 | 0 | 0 | 5 | 4 | 0 | 0 | — | | 28 | 10 |
| Vasco da Gama | 2009 | Série B | 26 | 9 | 6 | 1 | — | | 11 | 5 | — | | 43 | 15 |
| Vasco da Gama | 2010 | Série A | 9 | 0 | 4 | 2 | — | | 9 | 2 | — | | 22 | 4 |
| Vasco da Gama | 2011 | Série A | 0 | 0 | 0 | 0 | — | | 3 | 0 | — | | 3 | 0 |
| Vasco da Gama | 2012 | Série A | 28 | 2 | 0 | 0 | 4 | 0 | 3 | 1 | — | | 35 | 3 |
| Vasco da Gama | 2013 | Série A | 2 | 1 | 0 | 0 | 0 | 0 | 12 | 3 | — | | 14 | 4 |
| Vasco da Gama | Total | | 65 | 12 | 10 | 3 | 4 | 0 | 38 | 11 | — | | 117 | 26 |
| Grêmio | 2011 | Série A | 0 | 0 | 0 | 0 | 5 | 1 | 7 | 0 | — | | 12 | 1 |
| Bahia | 2011 | Série A | 19 | 0 | 0 | 0 | — | | 0 | 0 | — | | 19 | 0 |
| Goiás | 2014 | Série A | 0 | 0 | 2 | 0 | 0 | 0 | 4 | 0 | — | | 6 | 0 |
| Botafogo | 2014 | Série A | 13 | 0 | 0 | 0 | 0 | 0 | 0 | 0 | — | | 13 | 0 |
| Figueirense | 2015 | Série A | 14 | 3 | 1 | 1 | — | | 0 | 0 | — | | 15 | 4 |
| Figueirense | 2016 | Série A | 8 | 3 | 0 | 0 | 2 | 0 | 4 | 1 | 1 (Note: Appearance in Primeira Liga (Brazil).) | 0 | 15 | 4 |
| Figueirense | Total | | 22 | 6 | 1 | 1 | 2 | 0 | 4 | 1 | 1 | 0 | 30 | 8 |
| Atlético Paranaense | 2017 | Série A | 3 | 0 | 1 | 0 | 6 | 1 | 0 | 0 | — | | 10 | 1 |
| Boavista | 2019 | Série D | 0 | 0 | 0 | 0 | — | | 4 | 1 | — | | 4 | 1 |
| Career total | | | 264 | 42 | 36 | 9 | 57 | 8 | 83 | 17 | 6 | 0 | 446 | 76 |

=== International ===
Appearances and goals by national team and year
| National team | Year | Apps | Goals |
|---|---|---|---|
| Brazil | 2003 | 4 | 0 |
| Brazil | 2005 | 1 | 0 |
| Total | | 5 | 0 |

== Honours ==
Fluminense

- Campeonato Carioca: 2002
- Copa do Brasil: 2007

Porto

- Primeira Liga: 2003–04
- Supertaça Cândido de Oliveira: 2004
- UEFA Champions League: 2003–04
- Intercontinental Cup: 2004

Corinthians

- Campeonato Brasileiro Série A: 2005

Vasco da Gama

- Campeonato Brasileiro Série B: 2009

Individual

- Carioca Team of the Year: 2009
