= Pini Zahavi =

Israeli sports agent (born 1955)

- פיני זהבי
- Born: Pinhas Zahavi; 1943 (age 82–83); Ness Ziona, Israel
- Occupation: Sports agent

Pinhas "Pini" Zahavi (Hebrew: פנחס "פיני" זהבי; born 1943) is an Israeli football agent.

Zahavi was involved in the change of ownership of Portsmouth and for his work as a football agent, especially the (at the time) record-breaking transfer of Rio Ferdinand.

Zahavi's offices are in Tel Aviv. His business partner is Walter Palombo Italian, Swiss-based, sports agent.

== Biography ==
Zahavi was born in Ness Ziona, Israel in 1955, to a family of Jewish background. He is the son of a shopkeeper who sold building materials to local tradesmen. He has two elder sisters and a brother.

Zahavi is a widower with two children. He lives in a seaside apartment in the north of Tel Aviv and rents a flat in Marble Arch, London. He is the great-uncle of footballer Alex Zahavi.

Zahavi began a career as a football journalist after dropping out of university. He worked for the Israeli newspapers Hadashot Hasport, Yedioth Ahronoth and Hadashot.

Zahavi negotiated his first deal in 1979, the transfer of Israeli defender Avi Cohen from Maccabi Tel Aviv to Liverpool. As a sports journalist, he built up a network of contacts throughout the 1980s. He gave up his job as a journalist in 1998 and negotiated his second deal the following year. This marked the beginning of his career as an agent and he continued to develop close ties in the football world by organising friendly internationals in Israel, inviting players, including Graeme Souness and Kenny Dalglish, to holiday at his villa in Eilat, and even taking oranges to Melwood, Liverpool's training ground, as a gift for players and staff.

== Sports agent career ==
=== First transfer dealings ===
Zahavi's first transfer deal was undertaken in 1979 when he helped arrange the transfer of Israeli defender Avi Cohen from Maccabi Tel Aviv to Liverpool for £200,000. Zahavi, who travelled to England regularly to watch football, recommended Cohen to Liverpool when he saw Peter Robinson, the then secretary of the club, at Heathrow airport during a flight delay caused by fog. The player had got to know Zahavi through his coverage of Maccabi Tel Aviv in Yedioth Ahronoth. Zahavi was paid an introduction fee for his part in the deal.

A year later, Zahavi arranged a loan move to Maccabi Tel Aviv for Manchester City player Barry Silkman, with whom Zahavi would later be associated with when Silkman became a football agent.

In 1990, Zahavi negotiated the transfer of another Israeli player, forward Ronnie Rosenthal, from Standard Liège to Liverpool. Kenny Dalglish was by then Liverpool's manager.

=== Rio Ferdinand ===
By this time, Zahavi had built an extensive network of contacts within English football. His friendships included not just Graeme Souness and Dalglish, but also Terry Venables, Ron Atkinson and Alex Ferguson, as well as many more among the next generation of managers and players.

In 1997, Zahavi negotiated the transfer of Israeli midfielder Eyal Berkovic from Southampton to West Ham United. Zahavi's association with Berkovic had already been responsible for the player's move from Maccabi Haifa to English football at Southampton, then being managed by Zahavi's friend, Graeme Souness.

A side effect of the West Ham deal was that it brought Zahavi into contact with Rio Ferdinand. Zahavi handled the transfer that took Ferdinand from West Ham to Leeds United for £18 million in 2000, and then his £30 million transfer from Leeds to Manchester United in 2002. As part of the deal, Zahavi was himself paid £1.13 million.

Zahavi was a friend of the Manchester United manager Alex Ferguson, whom he had first got to know in the late 1980s, and by the time of the Ferdinand transfer he was responsible for brokering almost every major Manchester United deal, including the sale of Jaap Stam to Lazio for £16.5 million and the purchase of Juan Sebastián Verón from the same club for £28.1 million in 2001. Juan Sebastián Verón had been signed for Lazio by another friend of Zahavi's, Sven-Göran Eriksson, whom he knew first as a young coach at Benfica.

=== Roman Abramovich and Chelsea ===
In 2003, Zahavi played an important and central role in Roman Abramovich's acquisition of Chelsea and in the influx of players that followed. Zahavi became an influential member of Abramovich's inner circle and was estimated to have earned as much as £5 million from the £111 million that Chelsea spent on players that summer.

In 1998, Zahavi had been introduced to Abramovich in Moscow by a mutual friend and so was able to provide an introduction when he was approached by Trevor Birch, the chief executive of the heavily indebted Chelsea, who were on the verge of being unable to pay their players' wages.

=== "Tapping-up" controversies ===
==== Ashley Cole ====
In 2005, The Football Association (FA) recommended that Zahavi be investigated by the responsible bodies for his part in the "tapping-up" of the Arsenal left back Ashley Cole, who was approached by Chelsea in contravention of Premier League regulations.

The independent commission established by the Premier League to investigate the incident after an official complaint by Arsenal concluded that Zahavi and Cole's agent Jonathan Barnett had extended an invitation to Chelsea to which the club had responded. Zahavi and Barnett were then present at the Royal Park Hotel, London, on 27 January 2005 when Cole met the Chelsea manager, José Mourinho, and club's chief executive, Peter Kenyon.

Chelsea, Mourinho and Cole were all fined for their part in the affair, while Barnett was fined £100,000 and had his licence suspended by the FA for 18 months, later reduced to a 12-month ban. Neither the FA nor the Premier League had any jurisdiction over Zahavi but referred the matter to FIFA, whose investigation was, as of October 2009, ongoing. Zahavi maintained his innocence of any wrongdoing, claiming that "at that time I did not represent Chelsea or Ashley Cole".

==== Rio Ferdinand ====
In April 2005, Zahavi denied that Chelsea had been engaged in an illegal approach to the Manchester United player Rio Ferdinand when it emerged that the defender had met Zahavi and Chelsea's chief executive Peter Kenyon at Carpaccio, a restaurant in Chelsea, London, meeting again at the Elysee Greek eatery near Tottenham Court Road hours later. Chelsea denied any approach had been made, although then-Manchester United manager Sir Alex Ferguson accused former Manchester United executive Kenyon of treating his former club with "contempt". Zahavi denied that the meetings were an attempt to pressure Manchester United into improving their offered contract to Ferdinand.

=== Portsmouth ===
==== Beginning of association and Yakubu transfer ====
Zahavi became associated with Portsmouth under the ownership of Milan Mandarić. He worked on the signings of Eyal Berkovic and Yakubu from Maccabi Haifa, owned by Zahavi's school friend Ya'akov Shahar, in April 2003 and was involved in the recruitment of Collins Mbesuma in August 2005.

In July 2005, Zahavi agreed a fee of £3.64 million for his part in Yakubu's transfer from Portsmouth to Middlesbrough. The fee, agreed with Middlesbrough's chief executive Keith Lamb, was to be paid in ten installments over five years if Yakubu remained at the club. The amount was the largest agent fee disclosed in English football at that time and was regarded as being extraordinary.

As part of the deal, Zahavi made payments to Barry Silkman, the agent who is understood to have spotted Yakubu's potential when he was playing in Nigeria and to have been responsible for the $500,000 transfer that took the player to Maccabi Haifa in 1999.

==== Takeover by Alexandre Gaydamak ====
In January 2006, Zahavi, together with his partner, assisted with the sale of Portsmouth to Alexandre Gaydamak. Earlier in his career, Zahavi had assisted with the sale of Beitar Jerusalem to Gaydamak's father, the Russian–Israeli businessman Arkady Gaydamak.

Zahavi worked on a number of deals for Portsmouth's new regime, bringing Avram Grant to the club, initially as a technical director in June 2006, signing a two-year scouting contract worth £800,000, and being involved in signing and selling a number of players.

When Portsmouth went into administration after multiple changes of owner in February 2010, Zahavi was among the 24 agents to whom the club owed almost £9 million. His own share of the outstanding amount totalled £2.074 million.

=== David Alaba contract negotiations ===
In September 2020, the contract negotiations between Bayern Munich and David Alaba were lengthy. Uli Hoeneß, former president of Bayern, then called Pini Zahavi "greedy piranha". Hoeneß said that Zahavi wants more than €10 million for his services if Alaba signs a new contract.

== Other business interests ==
With his friend and associate, the businessman Eli Azur, Zahavi co-owns a media company, Charlton, that holds the television rights in Israel for major sports, including those of the English Premier League and the top flight of Israel's domestic football. The decision of the company to broadcast the 2006 FIFA World Cup through a pay-per-view offering proved very unpopular in Israel, leading to a boycott of the service and compromising Zahavi's reputation in the country.

Zahavi also holds a share of HAZ Racing Team, one of the top motorsport teams in Argentina (the "Z" on HAZ comes from his last name).
