= 2005 Santos FC season =

Santos
2005 season
- President: Marcelo Teixeira
- Coach: Oswaldo de Oliveira; Nelsinho Baptista; Alexandre Gallo
- Stadium: Vila Belmiro
- Campeonato Brasileiro: 10th
- Campeonato Paulista: 3rd
- Copa Libertadores: Quarter-finals
- Copa Sudamericana: First round

The 2005 season was Santos Futebol Clube's ninety-third season in existence and the club's forty-sixth consecutive season in the top flight of Brazilian football.

In July, Spanish giants Real Madrid signed Robinho by agreeing to pay a fee equal to 60 percent of the buyout clause in his contract belonging to Santos (€24). After the sold, the club didn't kept the great results of the last years, and they ended in the 10th position in Campeonato Brasileiro.

== Players ==
=== Squad information ===
Note: Flags indicate national team as defined under FIFA eligibility rules; some limited exceptions apply. Players may hold more than one non-FIFA nationality.

No.	Pos.	Nation	Player
—	GK	COL	Henao
—	GK	BRA	Mauro
—	DF	BRA	Ávalos
—	DF	BRA	Halisson
—	DF	BRA	Leonardo
—	DF	BRA	Domingos
—	DF	BRA	Flávio
—	DF	BRA	Paulo César
—	DF	BRA	Léo
—	MF	BRA	Ricardo Bóvio
—	MF	BRA	Fabinho
—	MF	BRA	Zé Elias

No.	Pos.	Nation	Player
—	MF	BRA	Tcheco
—	MF	BRA	Fábio Baiano
—	MF	BRA	Ricardinho
—	MF	BRA	Luis Augusto
—	MF	BRA	Rossini
—	MF	BRA	Giovanni
—	MF	BRA	Luciano Henrique
—	FW	BRA	Douglas
—	FW	BRA	Geilson
—	FW	BRA	Basílio
—	FW	BRA	Robinho
—	FW	BRA	Deivid

=== Appearances and goals ===
Pos.	Name	Campeonato Brasileiro		Campeonato Paulista		Copa Libertadores		Copa Sudamericana		Total	
Pos.	Name	Apps	Goals	Apps	Goals	Apps	Goals	Apps	Goals	Apps	Goals
GK	(Brazil) Mauro	14	0	16	0	4	0	0	0	34	0
GK	(Colombia) Henao	4	0	3	0	6	0	0	0	13	0
GK	(Brazil) Saulo	24	0	0	0	0	0	2	0	26	0
DF	(Brazil) Flávio	6(7)	0	12(4)	0	3(3)	1	1	0	36	1
DF	(Brazil) Ávalos	27(1)	1	14	0	10	1	1	0	53	2
DF	(Brazil) Halisson	14(8)	3	5(2)	0	7(1)	0	0	0	37	3
DF	(Brazil) Paulo César	29	0	6	0	6	1	0	0	41	1
DF	(Brazil) Rogério	15(4)	1	4(1)	0	0	0	2	0	26	1
DF	(Brazil) Leandro	0	0	1	0	0	0	0	0	1	0
DF	(Brazil) Nadson	1	0	0	0	0	0	0	0	1	0
DF	(Brazil) Carlinhos	8(2)	1	0	0	0	0	7	0	10	1
DF	(Brazil) Luiz Alberto	18	2	0	0	0	0	2	0	20	2
DF	(Brazil) Fábio	0(1)	0	0	0	0	0	0	0	1	0
DF	(Brazil) Kléber	15	0	0	0	0	0	0	0	15	0
DF	(Brazil) Matheus Ferraz	3(1)	0	0	0	0	0	0	0	4	0
DF	(Brazil) Zé Leandro	6	0	1	0	0	0	0	0	7	0
MF	(Brazil) Zé Elias	11(3)	1	2(1)	0	7	0	2	0	26	1
MF	(Brazil) Fabinho	26	0	9	0	7	0	1	0	43	0
MF	(Brazil) Ricardinho	35	10	12	1	9	6	0	0	56	17
MF	(Brazil) Bóvio	22(1)	0	12(4)	0	10	1	1	0	50	1
MF	(Brazil) Rivaldo	0(2)	0	0(1)	0	0	0	0	0	3	0
MF	(Brazil) Beto	0	0	3(2)	0	0	0	0	0	5	0
MF	(Brazil) Cadu	0	0	2(1)	0	0	0	0	0	3	0
MF	(Brazil) Xuxa	0	0	2(1)	0	0	0	0	0	3	0
MF	(Brazil) Edmílson	0(6)	1	0(1)	0	0	0	0(1)	1	8	2
MF	(Brazil) Luciano Henrique	13(8)	2	0	0	0	0	0(2)	0	23	2
MF	(Brazil) Élton	14(3)	2	0	0	0	0	1	1	18	3
MF	(Brazil) Danilinho	1(8)	0	0	0	0	0	0(1)	0	10	0
MF	(Brazil) Wendel	17(9)	1	0	0	1	0	2	0	29	1
MF	(Brazil) Giovanni	26(1)	4	0	0	0	0	1(1)	0	29	4
MF	(Brazil) Léo Lima	4(7)	0	0	0	0	0	2	0	13	0
MF	(Brazil) Gavião	6(1)	0	0	0	0	0	0	0	7	0
MF	(Brazil) Heleno	10(1)	0	0	0	0	0	0	0	11	0
MF	(Brazil) Bruno	0(1)	0	0	0	0	0	0	0	1	0
MF	(Brazil) Alexandre	0(1)	0	0	0	0	0	0	0	1	0
FW	(Brazil) Basílio	12(16)	7	10(3)	5	2(7)	1	0	0	50	13
FW	(Brazil) Douglas	3(2)	2	5(1)	2	0(1)	0	2	0	14	4
FW	(Brazil) William	2(2)	2	0	0	0(3)	0	0	0	7	2
FW	(Brazil) Geílson	17(6)	10	1	1	0	0	1(1)	1	26	12
FW	(Brazil) Fabiano	2(4)	2	0	0	0(2)	0	0	0	8	2
FW	(Brazil) Frontini	5(3)	1	0	0	0	0	0	0	8	1
FW	(Brazil) Diego	6(5)	1	0	0	0	0	1	0	12	1
FW	(Brazil) Cláudio Pitbull	7(4)	2	0	0	0	0	0	0	11	2
FW	(Brazil) Luizão	4(1)	0	0	0	0	0	0	0	5	0
Players who left the club during the season
DF	(Brazil) Altair	6(1)	0	0	0	0	0	0	0	7	0
DF	(Brazil) Antônio Carlos	0	0	1	0	0	0	0	0	1	0
DF	(Brazil) Domingos	0	0	14(1)	0	2	0	0	0	17	0
DF	(Brazil) Giba	0	0	3(2)	0	0	0	0	0	5	0
DF	(Brazil) Léo	6	0	10	1	8	1	0	0	24	2
DF	(Brazil) Leonardo	2(1)	0	4(1)	0	2(3)	0	0	0	13	0
DF	(Brazil) Preto	0	0	1(1)	0	0	0	0	0	2	0
MF	(Brazil) Elano	0	0	4	1	0	0	0	0	4	1
MF	(Brazil) Fábio Baiano	0	0	8(5)	1	1(1)	0	0	0	15	1
MF	(Brazil) Fernando Diniz	0	0	0(2)	0	1(1)	0	0	0	4	0
MF	(Brazil) Luís Augusto	0	0	4(1)	0	0	0	0	0	5	0
MF	(Brazil) Rossini	3	0	4(1)	0	0(3)	0	0	0	11	0
MF	(Brazil) Tcheco	2	0	9(2)	0	4(2)	0	0	0	19	0
FW	(Brazil) Deivid	7	5	16(2)	12	10	5	0	0	35	22
FW	(Brazil) Evando	0	0	1(8)	1	0	0	0	0	9	1
FW	(Brazil) Robinho	11	7	14	11	9	6	0	0	34	24

== Transfers ==
=== In ===
Pos.	Name	Moving from	Source
GK	(Colombia) Henao	(Colombia) Once Caldas	
MF	(Brazil) Tcheco	(Saudi Arabia) Ittihad FC	
MF	(Brazil) Fábio Baiano	(Brazil) Corinthians	
MF	(Brazil) Fernando Diniz	(Brazil) Cruzeiro	
FW	(Brazil) Evando	(Brazil) Avaí	
FW	(Brazil) Éder Ceccon	(Brazil) Avaí	
MF	(Brazil) Danilinho	(Brazil) América-SP	
MF	(Brazil) Luciano Henrique	(Brazil) Atlético Sorocaba	
MF	(Brazil) Fabiano	(Brazil) Atlético Sorocaba	
DF	(Brazil) Altair	(Brazil) Portuguesa	
MF	(Brazil) Wendel	(Portugal) Nacional da Madeira	
MF	(Brazil) Giovanni	(Greece) Olympiacos	
FW	(Brazil) Diego	(Brazil) Internacional	
MF	(Brazil) Léo Lima	(Portugal) Porto	
FW	(Argentina) Frontini	(Brazil) Ponte Preta	
DF	(Brazil) Luiz Alberto	(Spain) Real Sociedad	
MF	(Brazil) Gavião	(Japan) Jubilo Iwata	
DF	(Brazil) Kléber	(Switzerland) Basel	
MF	(Brazil) Heleno	(Brazil) Vila Nova	
FW	(Brazil) Cláudio Pitbull	(Portugal) Porto	
FW	(Brazil) Luizão	(Japan) Nagoya Grampus	

=== Out ===
Pos.	Name	Moving to	Source	Notes
GK	(Chile) Nelson Tapia	(Chile) Cobreloa		
DF	(Brazil) Pereira	(Brazil) Portuguesa		On loan
GK	(Brazil) Rafael	(Brazil) São Bento		
DF	(Brazil) André Luís	(Portugal) Benfica		
DF	(Brazil) Márcio	(Brazil) Brasiliense		
MF	(Brazil) Marcinho	(Brazil) CRB		
MF	(Brazil) Preto Casagrande	(Brazil) Fluminense		
MF	(Brazil) Lello	(Brazil) Portuguesa Santista		
MF	(Brazil) Narciso	Retired		
MF	(Brazil) Luís Augusto	(Brazil) Paysandu		
GK	(Brazil) Júlio Sérgio	(Brazil) Juventude		
DF	(Brazil) Antônio Carlos	(Brazil) Juventude		
MF	(Brazil) Elano	(Ukraine) Shakhtar Donetsk		
FW	(Brazil) Luizinho	(Brazil) Portuguesa		
DF	(Brazil) Giba	(Brazil) Fortaleza		
DF	(Brazil) Domingos	(Brazil) Grêmio		On loan
DF	(Brazil) Pereira	(Brazil) Grêmio		On loan
MF	(Brazil) Fábio Baiano	(Brazil) Atlético Mineiro		
DF	(Brazil) Zé Leandro	(Brazil) Portuguesa Santista		
DF	(Brazil) Altair	(Brazil) Gama		
MF	(Brazil) Fernando Diniz	(Brazil) Paulista		
DF	(Brazil) Preto	(Brazil) Ponte Preta		
MF	(Brazil) Rossini	(Brazil) Portuguesa Santista		
MF	(Brazil) Tcheco	(Saudi Arabia) Ittihad FC		
FW	(Brazil) Éder Ceccon	(Brazil) Atlético Sorocaba		
FW	(Brazil) Evando	(Brazil) Ponte Preta		
DF	(Brazil) Léo	(Portugal) Benfica		
FW	(Brazil) Deivid	(Portugal) Sporting		
FW	(Brazil) Robinho	(Spain) Real Madrid		
DF	(Brazil) Paulo César	(France) Paris Saint-Germain		
DF	(Brazil) Flávio	Released		
MF	(Brazil) Gavião	Released		
FW	(Brazil) Douglas	(Switzerland) Chiasso		
DF	(Brazil) Halisson	(Brazil) Ipatinga		
DF	(Brazil) Rogério	(Brazil) Guarani		
DF	(Brazil) Leonardo	(Ukraine) Shakhtar Donetsk		
MF	(Brazil) Edmílson	(Brazil) Guarani		
MF	(Brazil) Rivaldo	(Brazil) Guarani		
MF	(Brazil) Danilinho	(Brazil) América-SP		

== Competitions ==
=== Overview ===
Competition	Started round	Final position / round	First match	Last match
Campeonato Brasileiro	First stage	10th	24 April	4 December
Campeonato Paulista	First stage	3rd	20 January	14 April
Copa Libertadores	Group stage	Quarterfinals	16 February	15 June
Copa Sudamericana	First stage	First stage	17 August	31 August

Source: Competitions

=== Detailed overall summary ===
	Total	Home	Away
Games played	73	37	36
Games won	32	20	12
Games drawn	18	11	7
Games lost	23	6	17
Biggest win	6–0 v Bolívar	5–1 v Rio Branco	6–0 Bolívar
Biggest loss	1–7 v Corinthians	0–4 v Internacional	1–7 v Corinthians
Clean sheets	18	15	3
Goals scored	133	67	66
Goals conceded	112	37	75
Goal difference	+21	+30	-9
Average GF per game	1.82	1.81	1.83
Average GC per game	1.53	1.00	2.08
Most appearances	Ricardinho (56)	Ricardinho (30)	Ricardo Bóvio and Basílio (27)
Top scorer	Robinho (24)	Robinho (15)	Ricardinho (12)
Points	114/219 (52.05%)	71/111 (63.96%)	43/108 (39.81%)
Winning rate	43.83%	54.05%	33.33%

=== Campeonato Brasileiro ===
==== League table ====
Pos	Team	Pld	W	D	L	GF	GA	GD	Pts	Qualification or relegation
8	Cruzeiro	42	17	9	16	73	72	+1	60	Qualified for the 2006 Copa Sudamericana
9	Botafogo	42	17	8	17	57	56	+1	59	Qualified for the 2006 Copa Sudamericana
10	Santos	42	16	11	15	68	71	−3	59	Qualified for the 2006 Copa Sudamericana
11	São Paulo (Note: Despite qualifying for the Copa Sudamericana, São Paulo cannot participate in 2006 as they are already qualified for the Libertadores as defending champions. The seed has already been reallocated to Vasco da Gama.)	42	16	10	16	77	67	+10	58	Qualified for the 2006 Copa Libertadores
12	Vasco da Gama	42	15	11	16	74	84	−10	56	Qualified for the 2006 Copa Sudamericana

==== Results summary ====
Overall								Home						Away					
Pld	W	D	L	GF	GA	GD	Pts	W	D	L	GF	GA	GD	W	D	L	GF	GA	GD
42	16	11	15	68	71	−3	59	9	7	5	31	24	+7	7	4	10	37	47	−10

Last updated: 4 December 2005.
Source: Competitive matches

==== Results by round ====
Round	1	2	3	4	5	6	7	8	9	10	11	12	13	14	15	16	17	18	19	20	21	22	23	24	25	26	27	28	29	30	31	32	33	34	35	36	37	38	39	40	41	42
Ground	H	A	H	A	H	A	H	A	A	H	A	H	H	A	H	H	A	A	H	A	H	A	H	A	H	A	H	A	H	H	A	H	A	A	H	A	A	H	H	A	H	A
Result	W	W	W	L	W	L	D	D	W	D	W	W	L	L	L	L	W	D	D	D	W	W	W	D	D	L	W	L	D	W	L	D	W	W	L	L	L	L	D	L	W	L
Position	1	1	1	2	1	3	5	6	3	4	4	3	4	4	6	9	6	8	9	10	7	6	5	5	5	6	5	6	6	6	7	7	6	6	6	7	8	8	9	10	9	10

Source: Futpédia
A = Away; H = Home; W = Win; D = Draw; L = Loss

==== Matches ====
24 April 1	Santos	4–1	Paysandu	São Caetano do Sul
18:10 UTC-03:00	Deivid 4', 90'; Robinho 20' (pen.); Edmílson 69'	Report	22' (o.g.) Leonardo	Stadium: Anacleto Campanella; Referee: Clever Assunção Gonçalves

1 May 2	Coritiba	2–3	Santos	Curitiba
18:10 UTC-03:00	Márcio Egídio 26'; Reginaldo Nascimento 60'	Report	42', 43' Fabiano; 45+2' Robinho	Stadium: Couto Pereira; Referee: Luiz Antônio Silva Santos

7 May 3	Santos	2–1	Atlético Paranaense	Santos
18:10 UTC-03:00	Robinho 32'; Halisson 54'	Report	12' Lima	Stadium: Vila Belmiro; Referee: Wilson de Souza Mendonça

15 May 4	Flamengo	2–1	Santos	Ilha do Governador
18:10 UTC-03:00	Obina 66'; Jônatas 86'	Report	54' Deivid	Stadium: Luso-Brasileiro; Referee: Evandro Rogério Roman

22 May 5	Santos	3–0	Atlético Mineiro	Santos
16:00 UTC-03:00	Ricardinho 14', 31'; Adriano 87' (o.g.)	Report		Stadium: Vila Belmiro; Referee: Wagner Tardelli

29 May 6	Palmeiras	2–1	Santos	São Paulo
16:00 UTC-03:00	Sergio Gioino 9'; Daniel 47'	Report	88' (pen.) Basílio	Stadium: Palestra Itália; Referee: Wilson Seneme

12 June 7	Santos	1–1	Fluminense	Santos
16:00 UTC-03:00	Deivid 19'	Report	45' (pen.) Tuta	Stadium: Vila Belmiro; Referee: Evandro Rogério Roman

19 June 8	Fortaleza	0–0	Santos	Ceará
18:10 UTC-03:00		Report		Stadium: Castelão; Referee: Wagner Tardelli

26 June 9	São Caetano	1–3	Santos	São Caetano do Sul
16:00 UTC-03:00	Alessandro 24'	Report	1' Deivid; 45+1' (pen.) Ricardinho; 78' Giovanni	Stadium: Anacleto Campanella; Referee: Paulo César de Oliveira

3 July 10	Santos	0–0	Juventude	Santos
18:10 UTC-03:00		Report		Stadium: Vila Belmiro; Referee: Djalma Beltrami

10 July 11	Goiás	3–4	Santos	Goiânia
16:00 UTC-03:00	Aldo 9'; Souza 37'; Jorge Mutt 71'	Report	6', 39' Douglas; 45' Basílio; 56' Ricardinho	Stadium: Serra Dourada; Referee: Alicio Pena Júnior

17 July 12	Santos	2–1	São Paulo	Santos
16:00 UTC-03:00	Halisson 18'; Carlinhos 88'	Report	36' Hernanes	Stadium: Vila Belmiro; Referee: Sálvio Spínola Fagundes Filho

20 July 13	Santos	2–3	Vasco	Santos
21:45 UTC-03:00	Geílson 19', 52'	Report	53' Anderson; 61' Fernandinho; 81' Alex Dias	Stadium: Vila Belmiro; Referee: Héber Lopes

24 July 14	Cruzeiro	3–2	Santos	Belo Horizonte
18:10 UTC-03:00	Fred 29'; Kelly 51'; Adriano Gabiru 59'	Report	23' Halisson; 33' Ricardinho	Stadium: Mineirão; Referee: Carlos Eugênio Simon

27 July 15	Santos	0–1	Ponte Preta	Santos
21:45 UTC-03:00		Report	53' Evando	Stadium: Vila Belmiro; Referee: Silvia Regina

13 October 16	Santos	2–3	Corinthians	Santos
20:30 UTC-03:00	Cláudio Pitbull 12'; Luciano Henrique 69'	Report	35' Betão; 72' Nilmar; 87' (pen.) Carlos Alberto	Stadium: Vila Belmiro; Referee: Cleber Wellington Abade

3 August 17	Internacional	0–1	Santos	Porto Alegre
21:45 UTC-03:00		Report	51' Robinho	Stadium: Beira Rio; Referee: Héber Lopes

7 August 18	Paraná Clube	1–1	Santos	Maringá
16:00 UTC-03:00	Daniel Marques 19'	Report	52' Basílio	Stadium: Willie Davids; Referee: Alicio Pena Júnior

11 August 19	Santos	1–1	Brasiliense	Santos
20:30 UTC-03:00	Robinho 39'	Report	90+2' (o.g.) Cristiano Ávalos	Stadium: Vila Belmiro; Referee: Djalma Beltrami

14 August 20	Botafogo	3–3	Santos	Ilha do Governador
18:10 UTC-03:00	Alex Alves 32', 90+2' (pen.); Émerson 65'	Report	36' Diego; 45+1' (pen.) Ricardinho; 71' Élton	Stadium: Luso-Brasileiro; Referee: Héber Lopes

21 August 21	Santos	4–3	Figueirense	Santos
18:10 UTC-03:00	Élton 18'; Robinho 22' (pen.), 30' (pen.); Giovanni 27'	Report	47' Cléber; 54' Michel Bastos; 58' Edmundo	Stadium: Vila Belmiro; Referee: Luiz Antônio Silva Santos

24 August 22	Paysandu	2–3	Santos	Belém
21:45 UTC-03:00	Róbson 32'; Marco Aurélio 38'	Report	44' Giovanni; 50' Geílson; 72' Zé Elias	Stadium: Mangueirão; Referee: Wagner Tardelli

28 August 23	Santos	2–0	Coritiba	Santos
18:10 UTC-03:00	Geílson 7', 19'	Report		Stadium: Vila Belmiro; Referee: Carlos Eugênio Simon

7 September 24	Atlético Paranaense	3–3	Santos	Curitiba
21:45 UTC-03:00	Jancarlos 2'; Schumacher 69'; David Ferreira 84' (pen.)	Report	35', 57', 80' Ricardinho	Stadium: Arena da Baixada; Referee: Djalma Beltrami

11 September 25	Santos	0–0	Flamengo	Santos
16:00 UTC-03:00		Report		Stadium: Vila Belmiro; Referee: Lourival Dias Lima Filho

18 September 26	Atlético Mineiro	3–0	Santos	Belo Horizonte
18:10 UTC-03:00	Catanha 29'; Ueslei 43'; Rubens Cardoso 67'	Report		Stadium: Mineirão; Referee: Elvecio Zequetto

21 September 27	Santos	2–1	Palmeiras	Santos
21:45 UTC-03:00	Frontini 17'; Basílio 77'	Report	75' Marcinho	Stadium: Vila Belmiro; Referee: Sálvio Spínola Fagundes Filho

25 September 28	Fluminense	4–3	Santos	Volta Redonda
18:10 UTC-03:00	Arouca 24'; Petković 68'; Leandro 85'; Gabriel 90+4'	Report	6' Luiz Alberto; 19' Cristiano Ávalos; 80' Basílio	Stadium: Raulino de Oliveira; Referee: Wilson de Souza Mendonça

1 October 29	Santos	0–0	Fortaleza	Santos
18:10 UTC-03:00		Report		Stadium: Vila Belmiro; Referee: Djalma Beltrami

4 October 30	Santos	2–0	São Caetano	Santos
20:30 UTC-03:00	Wendel 55'; Giovanni 80'	Report		Stadium: Vila Belmiro; Referee: Cleber Wellington Abade

8 October 31	Juventude	3–1	Santos	Porto Alegre
18:10 UTC-03:00	Enílton 55', 85'; Caíco 65'	Report	Cláudio Pitbull 53'	Stadium: Alfredo Jaconi; Referee: Elvecio Zequetto

16 October 32	Santos	1–1	Goiás	Santos
18:10 UTC-03:00	Luciano Henrique 22'	Report	9' Jorge Mutt	Stadium: Vila Belmiro; Referee: Luiz Antônio Silva Santos

22 October 33	São Paulo	1–2	Santos	São Paulo
20:30 UTC-02:00	Amoroso 70'	Report	50' (o.g.) Renan; 61' Geílson	Stadium: Morumbi; Referee: Leonardo Gaciba

26 October 34	Vasco	1–3	Santos	Rio de Janeiro
21:45 UTC-02:00	Romário 6'	Report	1' Geílson; 14' (pen.) Ricardinho; 15' Basílio	Stadium: São Januário; Referee: Wilson de Souza Mendonça

30 October 35	Santos	1–2	Cruzeiro	São Paulo
16:00 UTC-02:00	Basílio 23'	Report	18' Irineu; 58' Alecsandro	Stadium: Palestra Itália; Referee: Carlos Eugênio Simon

2 November 36	Ponte Preta	2–1	Santos	Campinas
21:45 UTC-02:00	Izaías 68'; Tico 86'	Report	24' Geílson	Stadium: Moisés Lucarelli; Referee: Djalma Beltrami

6 November 37	Corinthians	7–1	Santos	São Paulo
16:00 UTC-02:00	Rosinei 1'; Carlos Tevez 20', 36', 53'; Nilmar 57', 77'; Marcelo Mattos 90'	Report	8' Geílson	Stadium: Pacaembu; Referee: Evandro Rogério Roman

13 November 38	Santos	0–4	Internacional	São Caetano do Sul
18:10 UTC-02:00		Report	27', 37' (pen.) Alex; 76', 90' Rafael Sóbis	Stadium: Anacleto Campanella; Referee: Wallace Nascimento Valente

16 November 39	Santos	0–0	Paraná Clube	São Paulo
21:45 UTC-02:00		Report		Stadium: Pacaembu; Referee: Sérgio da Silva Carvalho

19 November 40	Brasiliense	1–0	Santos	Brasília
18:10 UTC-02:00	Igor 13'	Report		Stadium: Boca do Jacaré; Referee: Edson Esperidião

27 November 41	Santos	2–1	Botafogo	Santos
16:00 UTC-02:00	Geílson 13'; Rogério 51'	Report	90+1' Ruy	Stadium: Vila Belmiro; Referee: Giuliano Bozzano

4 December 42	Figueirense	3–1	Santos	Florianópolis
16:00 UTC-02:00	Alexandre 10'; Henrique 65'; Márcio Martins 75'	Report	66' Luiz Alberto	Stadium: Orlando Scarpelli; Referee: Fabrício Neves Correa

=== Campeonato Paulista ===
==== League table ====
Pos	Team	Pld	W	D	L	GF	GA	GD	Pts
1	São Paulo (C)	19	14	3	2	49	21	+28	45
2	Corinthians	19	11	4	4	33	15	+18	37
3	Santos	19	10	7	2	38	21	+17	37
4	Santo André	19	10	3	6	34	27	+7	33
5	São Caetano	19	10	2	7	35	30	+5	32

(C) Champions

==== Results summary ====
Overall								Home						Away					
Pld	W	D	L	GF	GA	GD	Pts	W	D	L	GF	GA	GD	W	D	L	GF	GA	GD
19	10	7	2	38	21	+17	37	6	4	0	19	7	+12	4	3	2	19	14	+5

Last updated: 17 April 2005.
Source: UOL Esportes

==== Matches ====
20 January 1	Santos	5–1	Portuguesa	Santos
20:30 UTC−02:00	Deivid 23', 33', 75'; Robinho 68', 71'	Report	88' Whelliton	Stadium: Vila Belmiro; Referee: Sálvio Spínola Fagundes Filho

23 January 2	Ponte Preta	1–2	Santos	Campinas
16:00 UTC−02:00	Harison 48' (pen.)	Report	52' Robinho; 61' Elano	Stadium: Moisés Lucarelli; Referee: Cleber Wellington Abade

27 January 3	Mogi Mirim	2–4	Santos	Mogi Mirim
20:30 UTC−02:00	Fábio Braz 39'; Anderson 90+2'	Report	9' Fábio Baiano; 59' Deivid; 89', 90' Douglas	Stadium: Romildo Ferreira; Referee: Edílson Pereira de Carvalho

30 January 4	Santos	1–1	Portuguesa Santista	Santos
18:10 UTC−02:00	Robinho 48'	Report	81' Rico	Stadium: Vila Belmiro; Referee: Edílson Pereira de Carvalho

5 February 5	Atlético Sorocaba	0–1	Santos	Sorocaba
16:00 UTC−02:00		Report	74' Basílio	Stadium: Walter Ribeiro; Referee: Anselmo da Costa

10 February 6	Santos	0–0	Guarani	Santos
20:30 UTC−02:00		Report		Stadium: Vila Belmiro; Referee: Paulo José Danelon

13 February 7	Santos	3–0	Corinthians	Santos
16:00 UTC−02:00	Léo 7'; Robinho 46', 55'	Report		Stadium: Vila Belmiro; Referee: Edílson Pereira de Carvalho

20 February 8	Ituano	1–1	Santos	Itu
18:00 UTC−02:00	Wilson Mathías 64'	Report	6' Basílio	Stadium: Novelli Júnior; Referee: Sálvio Spínola Fagundes Filho

23 February 9	Rio Branco	1–5	Santos	Americana
21:45 UTC−02:00	Capitão 49' (pen.)	Report	25', 58', 90' Robinho; 56' Basílio; 67' Deivid	Stadium: Décio Vitta; Referee: Paulo César de Oliveira

27 February 10	Santos	3–2	São Caetano	Santos
16:00 UTC−02:00	Robinho 41'; Deivid 53'; Evando 89'	Report	47' Marcinho; 69' Zé Luís	Stadium: Vila Belmiro; Referee: Wilson Seneme

6 March 11	Palmeiras	3–1	Santos	São Paulo
16:00 UTC−03:00	Daniel 42'; Pedrinho 71', 81'	Report	52' (pen.) Ricardinho	Stadium: Parque Antártica; Referee: Edílson Pereira de Carvalho

13 March 12	Santos	2–0	União Barbarense	Santos
16:00 UTC−03:00	Deivid 2', 85'	Report		Stadium: Vila Belmiro; Referee: Luiz Flávio de Oliveira

20 March 13	Santos	3–3	América	Santos
18:00 UTC−03:00	Robinho 8'; Basílio 22', 58'	Report	43' Danilinho; 55' Finazzi; 68' Guin	Stadium: Vila Belmiro; Referee: Anselmo da Costa

23 March 14	Santo André	3–2	Santos	Santo André
21:45 UTC−03:00	Richarlyson 61'; Rodrigão 67'; Leandrinho 86'	Report	21' (pen.) Deivid; 83' William	Stadium: Bruno José Daniel; Referee: Cleber Wellington Abade

26 March 15	Santos	1–0	Inter de Limeira	Santos
16:00 UTC−03:00	Deivid 82'	Report		Stadium: Vila Belmiro; Referee: Silvia Regina

31 March 16	União São João	2–2	Santos	Araras
20:30 UTC−03:00	Juliano 30', 90+1'	Report	57' William; 63' Deivid	Stadium: Hermínio Ometto; Referee: Phillipe Lombard

3 April 17	Santos	0–0	São Paulo	Mogi Mirim
16:00 UTC−03:00		Report		Stadium: Wilson de Barros; Referee: Wilson Seneme

10 April 18	Santos	1–0	Paulista	Santos
18:00 UTC−03:00	Deivid 88'	Report		Stadium: Vila Belmiro; Referee: Paulo César de Oliveira

17 April 19	Marília	1–1	Santos	Marília
16:00 UTC−03:00	Beto 11'	Report	7' Geílson	Stadium: Bento de Abreu; Referee: Paulo José Danelon

=== Copa Libertadores ===
==== Group stage ====
Pos	Team	Pld	W	D	L	GF	GA	GD	Pts
1	(Brazil) Santos	6	4	0	2	18	10	+8	12
2	(Ecuador) LDU Quito	6	2	2	2	7	10	−3	8
3	(Uruguay) Danubio	6	2	1	3	9	8	+1	7
4	(Bolivia) Bolívar	6	2	1	3	8	14	−6	7

16 February 1	Bolívar (Bolivia)	4–3	(Brazil) Santos	La Paz, Bolivia
21:45	Zermatten 1', 53', 85'; Cabrera 87'	Report	24', 56' Deivid; 90' Robinho	Stadium: Hernando Siles; Referee: Carlos Torres (Paraguay)

3 March 2	Santos (Brazil)	3–2	(Uruguay) Danubio	Santos, Brazil
19:15	Léo 38'; Robinho 70'; Ricardinho 89' (pen.)	Report	1' González; 86' Viera	Stadium: Vila Belmiro; Referee: Gabriel Brazenas (Argentina)

17 March 3	LDU (Ecuador)	2–1	(Brazil) Santos	Quito, Ecuador
18:45	Graziani 8'; Salas 13'	Report	26' Ricardinho	Stadium: Casa Blanca; Referee: Carlos Amarilla (Paraguay)

6 April 4	Santos (Brazil)	3–1	(Ecuador) LDU	Santos, Brazil
21:45	Robinho 21', 61'; Ricardinho 48'	Report	3' Urrutia	Stadium: Vila Belmiro; Referee: Horacio Elizondo (Argentina)

20 April 5	Danubio (Uruguay)	1–2	(Brazil) Santos	Montevideu, Uruguay
21:45	Pouso 52'	Report	66' Deivid; 84' (o.g.) Risso	Stadium: Jardines del Hipódromo; Referee: Héctor Baldassi (Argentina)

11 May 6	Santos (Brazil)	6–0	(Bolivia) Bolívar	Santos, Brazil
19:30	Ricardo Bóvio 2'; Ávalos 13'; Paulo César 42'; Ricardinho 58'; Basílio 70'; Deivid 70'	Report		Stadium: Vila Belmiro; Referee: Jorge Larrionda (Uruguay)

==== Knockout stage ====
===== Round of 16 =====
19 May First Leg	Universidad de Chile	2–1	(Brazil) Santos	Santiago, Chile
21:45	Rivarola 51'; Galaz 73'	Report	57' Ricardinho	Stadium: Estadio Nacional; Referee: Óscar Ruiz (Colombia)

25 May Second Leg	Santos (Brazil)	3–0 (4–2 agg.)	Universidad de Chile	Santos, Brazil
	Flávio 34'; Robinho 71', 89' (pen.)	Report		Stadium: Vila Belmiro; Referee: Horacio Elizondo (Argentina)

===== Quarter-finals =====
1 June First Leg	Atlético Paranaense (Brazil)	3–2	(Brazil) Santos	Coritiba, Brazil
	Evandro 26'; Marcão 41'; Lima 70'	Report	13' Ricardinho; 44' Deivid	Stadium: Arena da Baixada; Attendance: 20,757; Referee: Wilson de Souza Mendonça (Brazil)

15 June Second Leg	Santos (Brazil)	0–2 (2–5 agg.)	(Brazil) Atlético Paranaense	Santos, Brazil
		Report	17', 54' Aloísio	Stadium: Vila Belmiro; Referee: Carlos Eugênio Simon (Brazil)

=== Copa Sudamericana ===
==== First round ====
17 August 1st leg	Fluminense (Brazil)	2–1	(Brazil) Santos	Rio de Janeiro, Brazil
	Tuta 42'; Gabriel 63'	Report	55' Élton	Stadium: São Januário; Referee: (Brazil) Leonardo Gaciba

31 August 2nd leg	Santos (Brazil)	2–1 (3–3 agg.) (2 – 4 p)	(Brazil) Fluminense	Santos, Brazil
	Edmílson 83'; Geílson 89'	Report	45+1' Tuta	Stadium: Vila Belmiro; Referee: (Brazil) Carlos Simon
	Penalties
	Giovanni (penalty scored); Luciano Henrique (penalty missed); Wendel (penalty scored); Edmílson (penalty missed)		(penalty scored) Gabriel; (penalty scored) Juan; (penalty missed) Beto; (penalty scored) Tuta; (penalty scored) Felipe
