= History of football in Brazil =

Trajectory of football in Brazil

The history of football in Brazil began in 1895 through the English, as in most other countries. The first teams began to form during this period, but, as well as the foundation of the clubs, the practice was also restricted to the white elite. According to reports, the first football ball in the country was brought in 1894 by Charles William Miller. However, the oldest records of football in Brazil date back to 1875, in Curitiba. The aristocracy dominated the football leagues, while the sport was gaining popularity in the countryside. Afro-Brazilians and the poorer sections of the population could only watch. It was only in the 1920s that Black Brazilians were accepted as the sport became more widespread, especially with professionalization in 1933.

Some clubs, mainly outside the Rio de Janeiro and São Paulo axis, still resisted modernization and remained amateur. However, as time went by, almost all of them became adapted to the new reality. Several traditional and established clubs abandoned the elite of the football, or even the sport altogether.

During the governments, especially Vargas, a great effort was made to promote football in the country. The construction of the Maracanã and the World Cup in Brazil (1950), for example, happened during the Vargas era. The victory in the 1958 World Cup, with a team led by Black footballers such as Didi and Pelé, mixed-race Vavá and Garrincha and captain Bellini, established football as the main element of national identification, gathering people of all colors, social conditions, creeds and different regions of the country.

== The beginning of football ==
Charles William Miller, the son of a railway company employee, is widely credited as the "father of Brazilian football". Miller, who was born in Brazil, went to England to study at Banister Court School. There, he became an admirer of football and in 1894, when he returned to Brazil, he brought with him two balls in his suitcase.

On a cold fall afternoon in 1895, I gathered my friends and invited them to play a game of football. The name was a novelty in itself, since they had only known cricket at that time.

- What is this game like? - some ask.

- What ball are we going to play with? - others asked.

- I have the ball. What we need to do is to fill it up.

- Fill it with what - they asked.

- With air.

- Then go and get it and I'll fill it up.

According to Charles Miller, in an interview given to the magazine O Cruzeiro in 1952, this is how football started in Brazil. On April 14, 1895, at Várzea do Carmo, in São Paulo, there was a match between Englishmen and Anglo-Brazilians, employees of the São Paulo Gaz Company and the São Paulo Railway Company. The friendly match, which is considered the first football game in the country, ended 4-2, with victory for the São Paulo Railway.

=== Other versions ===
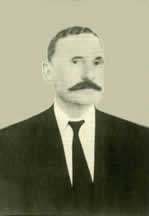
Thomas Donohoe.

However, there are records that claim that football had already been practiced in the country before. In 1874, foreign sailors played a match on the beaches of Rio de Janeiro. In 1878, crew members of the ship Criméia faced each other in an exhibition for Princess Isabel. In 1886, the Anchieta College in Nova Friburgo regularly enforced the practice of football, influenced by Jesuit priests. Miller's pioneerism is also contested by Bangu Atlético Clube, which claims that it was the Scotsman Thomas Donohoe who introduced the sport to Brazil. Thomas, who was a technician for the English firm Platt Brothers and Co. of Southampton, had been hired to help set up the textile factory in Bangu. In 1894, he would have gone to England and brought a ball from there, initiating the first Brazilian football game in May 1894, four months before Miller. For the historian Loris Baena Cunha, there would be records of a match between English employees of the Amazon Steam Navigation Company Ltd., Parah Gaz Company and Western Telegraph, in Pará, in 1890.

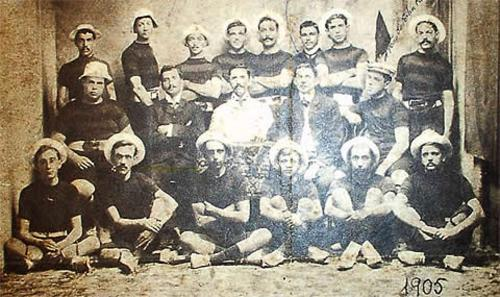
Sport team in 1905.

There are also other unverified cases. It is said that, in 1882, a man named Mr. Hugh would have introduced football among his employees in Jundiaí. It is also said that, between 1875 and 1876, employees of two companies would have played a match in the field of Paissandu Atlético Clube, in the city of Rio de Janeiro. However, the hypothesis based on Charles Miller is the most accepted and widespread in the country.

Soon after its introduction, the sport began to spread to other states. In 1897, student Oscar Cox, returning from Switzerland, introduced football to Rio de Janeiro and in 1901 created the Rio Team, the first team in the state. In Rio Grande do Sul, Johannes Minerman and Richard Woelckers founded the Sport Club Rio Grande in 1900. In Bahia, the person responsible for the introduction of the sport was José Ferreira Filho, also known as Zuza Ferreira, who had returned from England after five years of studies, on October 28, 1901. In 1903, Guilherme de Aquino Fonseca, after studying at the Hooton Lown School in England, returned to Pernambuco and founded the Sport Club do Recife in 1905. Vito Serpa introduced the sport to Minas Gerais in 1904 and Charles Miller Wright to Paraná in 1908.

== First championships and clubs ==
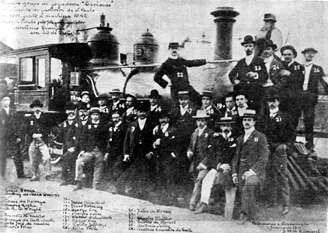
Rio Team leaving from São Paulo.

The São Paulo Athletic Club was the first football team in Brazil, formed in 1894 by Charles Miller, and the Associação Atlética Mackenzie College, from 1898, was the first team dedicated to Brazilians. The first club destined only for football was the São Paulo Sport Club Internacional, founded in 1899 and already extinct. Soon after, in the same year, the Sport Club Germânia was founded by the German Hans Nobiling, today under the name Esporte Clube Pinheiros.

Due to the extinction of Germânia's football department, Sport Club Rio Grande, located in the city of Rio Grande, Rio Grande do Sul, is considered the first football club founded in Brazil that is still active. In 1976, in honor of the club, the extinct CBD (now CBF) established the date of the club's foundation - July 19 - as the Football Day. After Sport Club Rio Grande, Associação Atlética Ponte Preta (AAPP) of Campinas, São Paulo, is the oldest active club, founded on August 11, 1900.

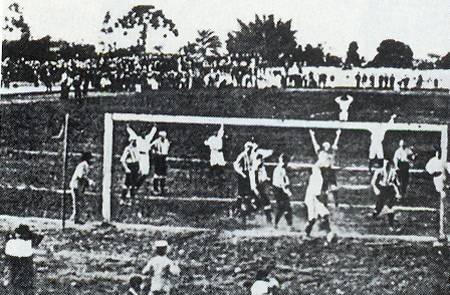
São Paulo Athletic Club and Club Athletico Paulistano in the final of the 1902 Campeonato Paulista (2-1), the first state championship played in Brazil.

In 1901, the first match between paulistas and cariocas was held, which would be consolidated in 1933 with the creation of the Torneio Rio–São Paulo. Enthusiastic about the squad formed by Rio Team, which would be the precursor of the Fluminense Football Club, Oscar Cox began to communicate with Renê Vanorden, from the extinct Sport Club Internacional, Charles Miller and Antonio Casemiro da Costa, who would become the founder of the Liga Paulista de Football, about the idea of a match between paulistas and cariocas. The first game took place on October 19, at the São Paulo Athletic Club field and ended in a 1-1 draw. The following day, another match took place which also ended in a 2-2 draw.

In the same year, on December 19, the Liga Paulista de Football was founded. In 1902, the Campeonato Paulista de Futebol, the first official championship in Brazil, was held, where the extinct São Paulo Athletic Club became champion. Gradually, new clubs were emerging in the state of São Paulo, such as SC Americano, AA São Bento, SC Internacional, Ypiranga and Paulistano, which presented a strong performance in the early years of the 20th century, but soon stopped practicing football in São Paulo.

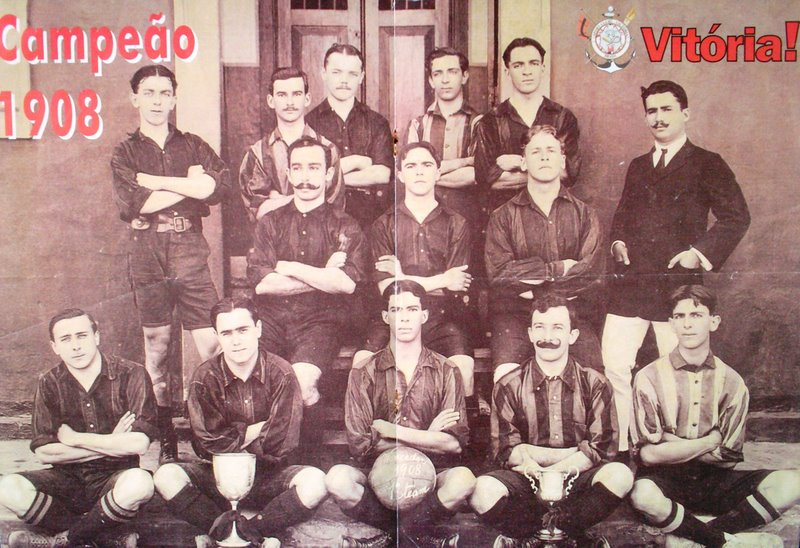
Squad of Vitória, champion of the 1908 Campeonato Baiano.

In Bahia, the state's football league was founded in 1905. The Liga Bahiana de Sports Terrestres had four founding clubs: São Paulo Clube (which did not participate in the championship), Clube Internacional de Cricket, Sport Club Victoria and Sport Club Bahiano. The Clube de Natação e Regatas São Salvador joined the league shortly before the start of the first competition that would consecrate Internacional de Cricket as champion. Among these, only Victoria, now Esporte Clube Vitória, founded in 1899 as Club de Cricket Victoria, remains active today.

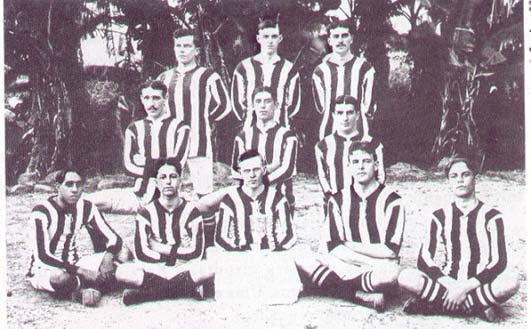
Botafogo team in 1906.

In Rio de Janeiro, on July 21, 1902, Fluminense, the first football club in the state that would stimulate the creation of a state league and organize the sport in the city, was founded. From 1904, new clubs emerged, including Botafogo Football Club (now Botafogo de Futebol e Regatas) and America, both from Rio de Janeiro. In 1906, the first Campeonato Carioca was held, in which Fluminense was champion. On May 30, 1909, Botafogo set the record for the biggest score in the history of Brazilian football, beating Sport Club Mangueira 24-0, in the Campeonato Carioca of that year. The top scorer was Gilbert Hime, who made nine goals, a record until 1976, when Dario scored ten in the game between Sport and Santo Amaro, in the Campeonato Pernambucano, whose final result was 14-0. Mangueira dropped out of the competition with four rounds to go.

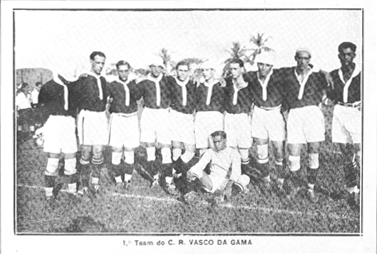
Vasco da Gama in the early years.

Between 1910 and 1919, more teams and federations emerged and the sport became increasingly popular. In 1910, after a visit of Corinthian FC from London to Brazil, the current Sport Club Corinthians Paulista was founded in São Paulo. Two years later, Santos Futebol Clube was founded in Santos, São Paulo. In 1912, Clube de Regatas do Flamengo would start to practice football, as well as Club de Regatas Vasco da Gama would do in 1915; both clubs existed since the 19th century, but had begun with the practice of rowing in Rio de Janeiro.

Initially, only white-skinned people could play football in Brazil as professionals, since most of the first clubs were founded by foreigners. The mestiço Carlos Alberto, in a match against his former club, America of Rio de Janeiro, in the 1914 Campeonato Carioca, covered himself with rice powder to make him look white. However, as the match progressed, sweat washed away the rice powder make-up and the farce was undone. The America fans, who knew him, started chasing him and shouting "rice powder!", a nickname that was eventually absorbed by the Fluminense fans, who started throwing rice and talcum powder at their team's entrance to the field.

Regional championships emerged, and the public and press, increasingly interested in the sport, spread it throughout the country. Football split from tennis and cricket, the sports of the elite, to arouse the interest of the general public, especially in the 1920s, when Black Brazilians began to be accepted at other clubs. Vasco was the first of the big clubs to win titles with a team full of black and poor players.

== Creation of the Brazilian national team ==
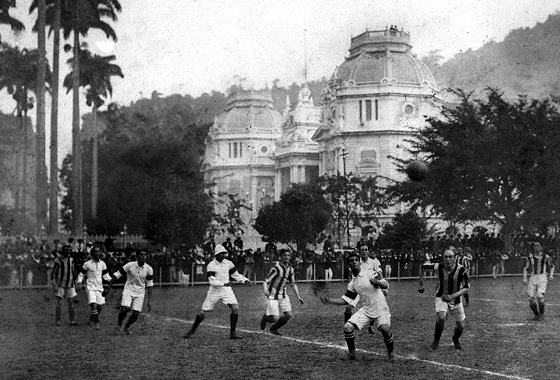
The Brazilian team's first match against Exeter City Football Club in 1914.

With the foundation of the Brazilian Sports Federation (FBS) in 1914, the Brazilian national team has its debut in a game considered unofficial by FIFA against the British team of Exeter City. Held at Fluminense Football Club's Laranjeiras Stadium in Rio de Janeiro, the hosts ran out 2-0 winners. The country's first title came two months later, when Brazil beat the Argentine team at the Club de Gimnasia y Esgrima La Plata field in Buenos Aires 1-0 and took the Roca Cup home.

== Critics ==
Despite having consolidated itself as the favorite sport of Brazilians as early as the 1920s, football was not seen with positive eyes during its popularization throughout the country. The heaviest criticism came from the intellectual elite. The writer Graciliano Ramos wrote in his chronicle Traças a Esmo that football was proof of European superiority over Brazilians, stating that its popularity would only be temporary due to the fragile biotype of those who lived in Brazil. Graciliano Ramos ended the chronicle ironically:

The real regional sports have been abandoned: the porrete, the cachação, the arm wrestling, the foot race, so useful to a citizen who is engaged in the risky trade of stealing chickens, the oxen catch, the calto, the cavalhada, and best of all, the cambapé, the rasteira. The rasteira! This is the national sport par excellence!

The most strident criticism came from the writer Lima Barreto, who saw football as a factor of dissension, and the clubs as associations run by descendants of slave masters. In his article Como Resposta, Careta, in the publication Marginalia, the writer states that football is "the primacy of ignorance and imbecility". Based on such opinions, Lima Barreto even created the Liga Contra o Foot-ball (English: League Against Foot-ball), in which he tried to ban the sport in the country, justifying the supposed evils of its practice, such as fights and deaths. Although it was never banned in Brazil, limitations to the practice of football were discussed. In 1916, the Academia Nacional de Medicina studied the hypothesis of banning the game for children under 18. In 1919, the practice was vetoed at the Colégio Pedro II in Rio de Janeiro.

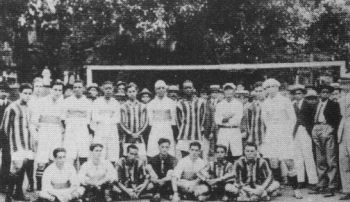
1919 Workers' Festival.

The working class did not welcome sport either. The trade union leaderships of the time, mostly composed of anarchists and communists, were suspicious of sport as they considered it a form of alienation produced by factory owners to deflect the attention of the proletariat from the workers' cause. For these leaders, football was "merely an expression of the consumerist and alienating manipulation of the bourgeoisie".

The relationship with union leaders began to change from the 1910s, when they began to realize that they could attract members to the anarchist/communist cause through sport. As a result, events that used matches between workers' teams as a pretext for spreading labor doctrine became commonplace. Years later, the Workers' Festival of 1919 was created, where teams formed by workers played friendly matches against each other.

== Popularization and the end of amateurism ==
The 1920s is considered the milestone for the popularization of football in Brazil. The best example of this occurred in the final of the third South American Football Championship (now Copa América), when the Brazilian team faced the Uruguayan team on May 29, 1919; it was the first time the Brazilian team had gone so far in the tournament. The expectation for the match was so great that the president of the time, Delfim Moreira, decreed an off-duty period in public offices; in Rio de Janeiro, shops did not operate that day. Even in other states, the match took on a patriotic feel, as O Estado de S. Paulo reports:

In the circle of young people, it is considered unpatriotic the lack of interest in the outcome of the continental championship, declared by a Brazilian! ... and in worldly circles, such an assertion is not accepted even out of snobbery.

The popularization of the sport triggered a battle between amateurism and professionalism. The first signs of paid players come from workers' football. Initially used as leisure and a source of discipline for their employees, factory owners soon realized that the success of teams bearing the factory's name was a great way to promote their products. Workers who excelled in the game began to enjoy several benefits, such as prizes for victory (in the jogo do bicho), time off for training and lighter work. For the first time, the valorization of "sports capital" and the emergence of the "worker-player" occurred. About this, the writer Mário Filho, addressing the specific case of Bangu, speaks in the book O Negro no Futebol Brasileiro:

Workers who played football well, who secured a place in the first team, went straight to the light room. Lighter work. (...) The boys who played in the church square knew that, when they grew up, if they were good football players, they would have guaranteed places in the factory. (...) After working hard, and especially playing hard, the worker-player won the prize of the light room. And it could be even better if he continued to earn the trust of the factory, of Bangu. There was the office, the softer work than in the light room. And the bigger salary.

The emergence of the "worker-player" provided workers with the possibility of sport to be a second source of income, as well as relative social mobility within the factory. The practice began to be seen as a possibility of social ascension. The player Domingos da Guia, who was very successful in the 1930s, reported in an interview that his start in football began much more out of necessity than of his own desire. His interest in the activity was due to the lucrative "bichos" he received after each victory.

=== Beginning of a new era ===
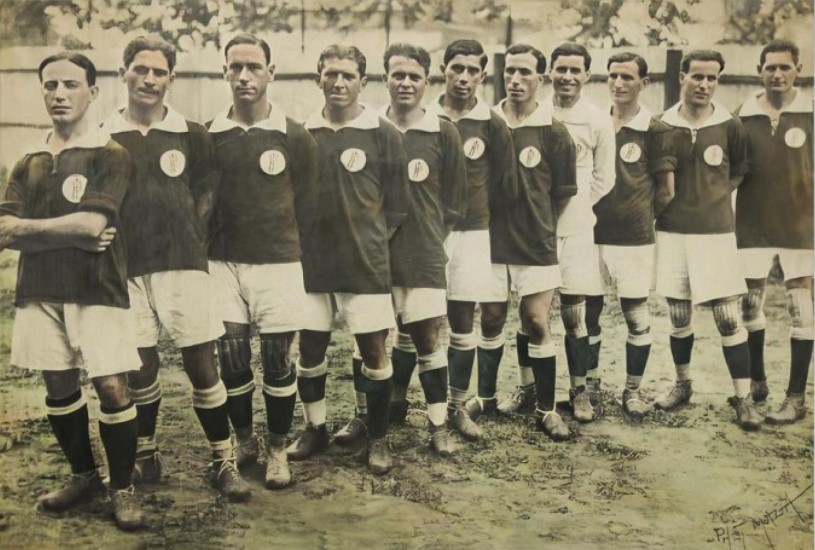
Palestra Itália, champion of the 1920 Paulista Championship.

In 1923, professionalism began to become a reality with Vasco da Gama, which had created a football department in 1915 and, since then, along with some other clubs in the suburbs, gathered players from low income, low education and even unemployed, disturbing the elite of Rio de Janeiro. For the upper class, the main aspect of football would be its practice for fun, without any pecuniary interest. Participation in sport would be a right of that class, and therefore directed to it and with self-centered rules. Consequently, the inclusion of players who participated for the income provided, and not for the pursuit of fun, would be a threat to this dominant ideology. The insertion of the lower classes in football was seen as a potential threat to the elitist clubs of the South Zone of Rio de Janeiro.

However, the threat was never seriously fought, since clubs that employed poor people among their ranks competed in lower divisions than the "big clubs" did. For some time, football in Rio de Janeiro was divided between the amateurism of the main division and the semi-professionalism, or "brown professionalism", present in lower divisions.

This happened until 1923, when Vasco ascended to the first division of the Campeonato Carioca de Futebol after having won the second state division. Vasco's squad was a clear mixture of the suburban teams: the crew was formed by the cab driver Nelson da Conceição, the dockworker Nicolino, the wall painter Ceci and the truck driver Bolão, all black, as well as four illiterate whites. Vasco, despite the disbelief in their potential, finished the first round with a campaign far ahead of their rivals, with six wins and a draw in seven games played. The good performance continued in the second round and led to the club winning the Campeonato Carioca. If, on the one hand, Black and illiterate people had not been in opposition to the elite, until then, Vasco's victory could not be supported by them due to the perceived view of an invasion of people without social status in a practice that had been restricted to the wealthier sectors of Brazil. About Vasco's victory, Mário Filho writes:

The advantage of being from a good family, being a student or being white had disappeared. The boy of good family, the student, the white, had to compete, on equal terms, with the poor, almost illiterate, the mulatto and the black to see who played better. It was a real revolution that was taking place in Brazilian football.

Outraged, the so-called "big clubs" began to articulate a way to contain the advance of professionalism in the Liga Metropolitana de Desportos Terrestres (LMDT). Accusing the LMDT of "populism" for supporting the "smaller" clubs, the South Zone teams demanded changes to the league's internal regulations, among which each club would have a vote with a certain value, with América, Botafogo, Flamengo and Fluminense having the highest score. Such changes were not accepted by most of the remaining teams, which led to a split in Rio de Janeiro football: the greats plus some other clubs left LMDT and founded on March 1, 1924 the Associação Metropolitana de Esportes Athleticos (AMEA). The exclusionary nature of the new league was made clear in its statute, which excluded the unemployed, illiterate and "those who derive their means of subsistence from any manual occupation" from practicing sport. The text below is an excerpt from the statute of the AMEA.

Chapter III - ADMISSION OF MEMBERS OF THE A.M.E.A.

Article 5, item 10 - Indicate their athlete number and name in full; current and previous residence; the profession they currently exercise and the one they previously exercised; the place where they practiced and the one where they practice; as well as the name of the persons under whose direction they exercised and exercise it.

Chapter IX - REGISTRATION OF AMATEURS, ITS FORMALITIES AND REQUIREMENTS

Art 65 - However, the following cannot be registered:

ITEM 2 - those who derive their means of subsistence from any manual occupation, considering as such that in which physical effort predominates;

ITEM 7- those who cannot read or write;

ITEM 9 - those who habitually have no certain profession or employment.

However, amateurism could not resist for long, either by the internal situation of football in Brazil or in the world. In 1923, in Italy, Juventus paid for the transfer of the athlete Viri Rosetta, but went to court asking for the annulment of the points achieved with him on the pitch. The Italian court ruled in favor of Juventus, setting the precedent for teams to take players from other teams at the cost of money, introducing professionalism in the country. Similarly, several other nations have adopted professionalism since 1924, such as Spain and Austria in Europe, as well as South American neighbors Argentina and Uruguay. The spread of professionalism led FIFA to authorize the participation of athletes who received salaries in the first World Cup in 1930. Internally, the situation was also getting complicated for amateurism. In 1932, a group of players published a manifesto in the newspaper Gazeta Esportiva asking for the right to exercise their profession as football players. In 1933, the player Floriano Peixoto Correa, known as Marechal da Vitória, publishes the book Grandezas e Misérias do Nosso Futebol, where he critically addresses amateurism. According to Correa:

With the development of football in the country, the development of hidden professionalism naturally increased. And the professionalism that should have been legalized on that occasion, began to enjoy a scandalous protection of our entities, clubs and walls, united in a shameless dishonesty that testified against their character and their hypocritical conduct, which was incapable of covering up the scandals that came later. And the "amateurism" was unmasked. In 1915 it was no longer a scandal that players were openly paid bonuses at any club in São Paulo, Rio, Pernambuco or Rio Grande do Sul.

In addition to Correa, players also reported the problems that the ban on professionalism caused them. The following transcript is by Amilcar Barbuy:

I'm going to Italy. I'm tired of being an amateur in football, where that status has ceased to exist for a long time, tainted by the hypocritical tipping system that clubs give their players, reserving the bulk of the income for themselves. For 20 years I selflessly gave my modest services to national football. What happened? The clubs got rich and I got nothing. I am poor. I'm a football pariah. I have nothing. I'm going to the country where they know how to pay for a player's ability.

The demands of these footballers were accompanied by club managers who were dissatisfied with the situation of "brown amateurism", which was neither amateurism nor professionalism. For them, professionalization could transform the sport into a spectacle and, above all, ensure the permanence of the best players in the teams.

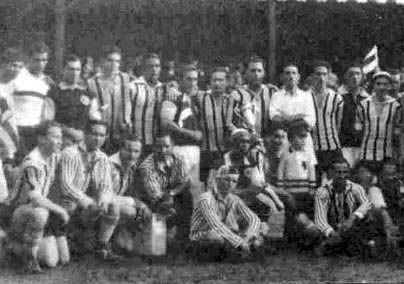
Gremio in 1931.

Without paying salaries to their players, amateur clubs were unable to compete with foreigners, who came to the country with interesting financial proposals for outstanding athletes. This was the case of Fausto dos Santos, who moved to Barcelona, in Spain, in 1931.

The installation of Getúlio Vargas in 1930 also had a strong impact on the end of amateur practices. Vargas' government promoted a project of integration of Brazilian identity and the creation of a Brazilian citizenship, in order to extend rights and duties to a larger portion of the population. For this, he regulated many aspects of society, including the creation of a more organized, structured and centralized sports policy.

Consequently, in 1933, the presidents of Vasco, Fluminense, América and Bangu split with the AMEA and founded the Liga Carioca de Football (LCF), the first entity to officially accept the registration of professional athletes.

In August of the same year, the Associação Paulista de Esportes Atléticos (APEA) followed the same path as the LCF. Both disaffiliate from the CBD and create the Federação Brasileira de Football (FBF), which supported professionalism and obtained from FIFA the right to represent Brazil in international competitions.

With professionalism beginning to take shape, the CBD became the great antagonist of the process. The frequent fights between the CBD and the FBF led to Brazil sending only amateur players to the 1934 World Cup, which resulted in the team's disqualification from the competition. However, in 1937, the CBD accepted professionalism in exchange for maintaining its power over national football. It was the extinction of amateur practices.

== Post-amateurism ==
The Copa América, initially called South American Football Championship, was the first competition involving national football teams; since 1916, it has involved South American countries. Between its first edition until 1949, Brazil was champion only three times in 21 occasions in which the tournament was held. Despite this, some historians attribute Brazil's heroic victory over Uruguay in the final of the 1919 South American Championship, held at the Fluminense stadium, built especially for the competition, on May 29 of that year, as the beginning of Brazil's passion for the sport. The match, won with a goal by Friedenreich in the third overtime, led to him being carried on the shoulders of the fans through the city and his boots being displayed in a jewelry store, as well as earning him the nickname El Tigre from his opponents. Besides being important for football, this match was a landmark for Brazilian music. Inspired by it, Pixinguinha composed the choro "1x0", the first record of music about football in Brazil.

If, on the one hand, the professionalization of football in Brazil meant that great potencies in state tournaments were extinguished, the process ended up opening up definitive space for the first geniuses of the national sport to take the field to replace El Tigre: Fausto dos Santos, Domingos da Guia, Leônidas da Silva, Waldemar de Brito, Zizinho and Pelé.

== World Cups ==
In 1930, the World Cups began to be played, counting with the presence of the Brazilian National Team in all editions. Despite weak performances in the first two editions, Brazil hosted the tournament in 1950, after an interruption due to the World War II.

=== The "Maracanazo" and its consequences ===
In 1950, Brazil hosted the World Cup, which raised expectations among the population for a first title. However, in the final of the competition, the Brazilian national team was defeated 2-1 to the Uruguayan national team, which won its second title. The result triggered a major change in Brazilian football, starting with the switch of the national team's uniform from white to yellow, blue, white and green. The episode went down in history as "Maracanazo", one of the biggest shock losses of all time.

In order to help end the national sorrow after the defeat, journalist Mario Filho organized the return of the Torneio Rio–São Paulo, which began to take place on a regular annual basis involving the main teams from Rio de Janeiro and São Paulo. This tournament would serve as the basis for the creation of a national championship years later. Soon after, the 1951 and 1952 Copa Rio Internacional appeared, with Palmeiras and Fluminense as their winners, respectively.

== The classic era ==
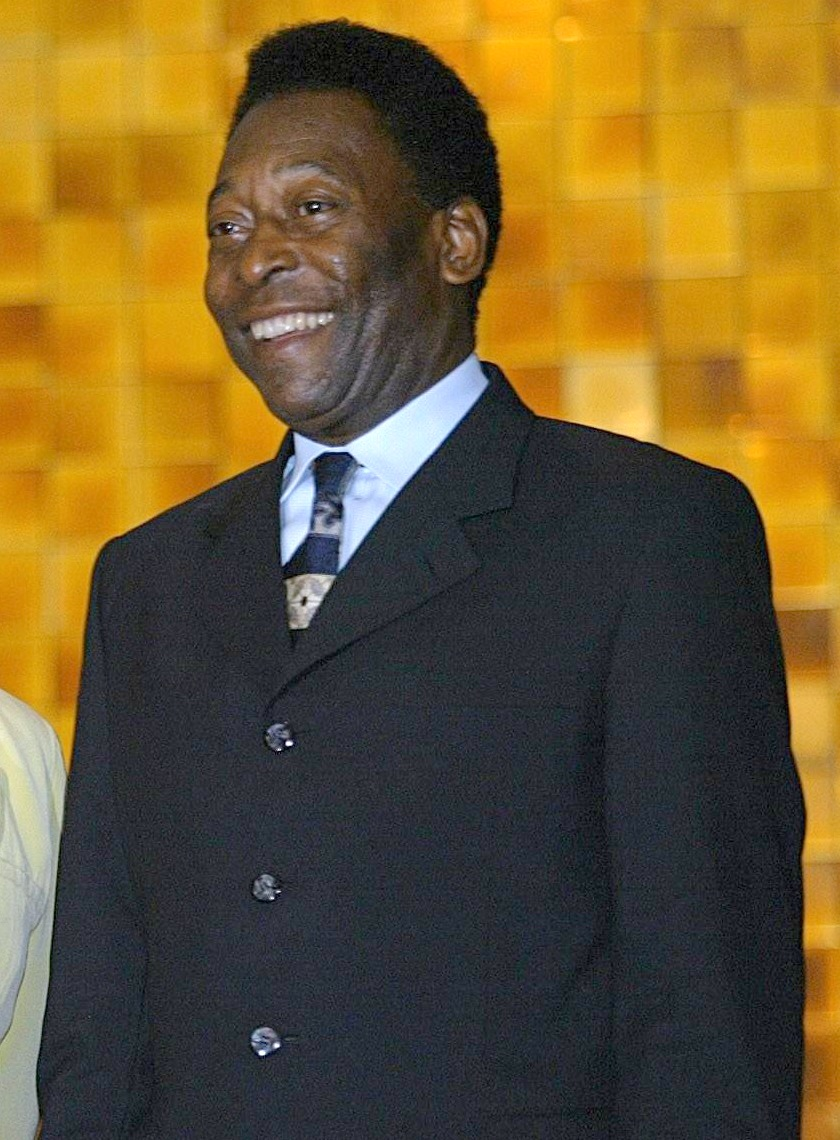
Pelé, the greatest athlete of the 20th century.

From the late 1950s onwards, Brazilian football created a number of great players. Pelé, Garrincha, Nílton Santos, Didi, Vavá, Zagallo, Djalma Santos and captain Bellini stood out, among others who took part in the 1958 World Cup winning campaign for the Brazilian national team. The line-up was repeated at the '62 World Cup, with Amarildo, Coutinho and Pepe joining the winning squad.

In 1959, the CBD decided to create a competition between clubs to replace the failing Campeonato Brasileiro de Seleções Estaduais. It was called Taça Brasil, the country's first nationwide tournament, created to define the Brazilian football champion club that would represent the country in the Copa Libertadores, which, at the time, had only the national champions of each nation (Argentine champion, Chilean champion, Uruguayan champion, Paraguayan champion, Colombian champion, Bolivian champion and Brazilian champion). The first champion was Bahia, but it was Santos, with Pelé in the team, who won the Brazilian Cup the most times (five in a row). At that point, Santos and Botafogo, with Garrincha and company, were the main Brazilian classics, both in regional, national and even international competitions, since the Copa Libertadores began to be played in 1960, still with little interest from Brazilian teams. In 1962, Santos was the first club in the country to win the Libertadores and to be champion of the Intercontinental Cup.

The success of Brazilian football made many Argentine teams hire Brazilian coaches in the 60s. Vicente Feola coached Boca Juniors in 1961, Osvaldo Brandão coached Club Atlético Independiente in 1961 and 1967, winning the 1967 National Championship, and Tim coached Boca Juniors to the 1968 National Championship.

Despite not having a good campaign in the 1966 World Cup, in 1970, the Brazilian team won the competition for the third time, receiving the Jules Rimet Cup (a trophy that would be stolen and melted thirteen years later) for being the first country to win the World Cup for the third time.

In 1967, the Torneio Roberto Gomes Pedrosa ("Robertão") was created to be the national championship in a new format, allowing the participation of a greater number of clubs. Derived from the Torneio Rio-São Paulo, this competition soon gained the status of a national championship, officially receiving the denomination of Taça de Prata from the CBD. The Torneio Rio-São Paulo was discontinued, as well as the Taça Brasil two years later, leaving the "Robertão" to define the new Brazilian champions until 1970.

== Brazilian football in the military dictatorship ==
In 1971, the CBD started a new tournament, the Campeonato Nacional de Clubes. However, this time, unlike the Torneio Roberto Gomes Pedrosa in relation to the Taça Brasil, there were no significant changes between the new competition and the old one.

From the original 20 clubs, the championship reached 94 participants in 1979, in a process of expansion that increased with the arrival of Admiral Heleno de Barros Nunes at the head of the CDB after the departure of João Havelange. Nunes was accused of favoring the ruling party in the selection of the new members of the competition, at a time when the government needed to be legitimized at the polls. In the streets, the people used to joke: "Where Arena is doing badly, a team goes to Nacional".

On the other hand, there was a greater integration of football in the country, even though only clubs from São Paulo, Rio de Janeiro and Rio Grande do Sul won the tournament between 1972 and 1984. Among them were Palmeiras, two-time champions in 1972 and 73, and Internacional, champion in 1975, 1976 and 1979 (the latter undefeated). Guarani won the championship in 1978, being the first club based outside a capital city to win the title. The hegemony of the states mentioned was only broken with the conquest of Coritiba in 1985.

Although timidly, the Brazilian clubs were becoming familiar with the continental championship, the Copa Libertadores. Cruzeiro was the second Brazilian team to win the competition, in 1976, followed by Flamengo and Grêmio in 1981 and 83 respectively. The latter two clubs also won the Intercontinental Cup in those years.

In 1974, the Brazilian national team finished fourth in the World Cup. In 1975, Osvaldo Brandão took charge of the squad, but after a good start, he strangely resigned and was replaced by Cláudio Coutinho. In 1978, the Brazilian national team finished in third place at the FIFA World Cup. Brazil proclaimed itself the "moral champion" for being the only undefeated team in this Cup and because Peru's goalkeeper, Ramón Quiroga, allegedly facilitated the match against Argentina, which needed to win by a difference of more than four goals; it won 6-0. The unlikely combination of results eliminated Brazil.

== The transformation of CBD into CBF ==
In 1979, the Brazilian Sports Confederation (CBD) changed its name to Brazilian Football Confederation (CBF), due to a FIFA decree stating that all national football entities should be focused exclusively on the development of this sport. This was not the case with the CBD, which at the time was involved in the promotion of other Olympic sports.

Giulite Coutinho presided over the CBF for two terms, from January 18, 1980 to January 17, 1986. In his administration, he had the support of Roberto Marinho and built the Granja Comary training center. In 1982 World Cup, the team assembled by Telê Santana, which had Zico, Falcão, Sócrates, Júnior, Oscar and Toninho Cerezo as its main names, was considered a candidate for the title, but ended up being eliminated in the quarter-finals of the competition to Italy.

In October 1982, the magazine Placar revealed the Sports Lottery Mafia scandal. 125 accused, including referees and players, among them two world champions for the Brazilian team, Amarildo and Marco Antônio, participated in a scheme that rigged results in favor of a group of bettors of the main game of chance of the time. The report won the ExxonMobil Journalism Award in the general category that year. In 1985, the Federal Police announced the conclusion of the investigation into the Sports Lottery Mafia; of the 125 accused in the report, only 20 people were indicted.

In 1986, the group of Marinho and Coutinho, represented by the candidacy of Medrado Dias, lost the command of the CBF to the group of the gangster Castor de Andrade, in the figure of the new president Octávio Pinto Guimarães. The election was tight, with accusations of corruption, fraud and the threat of intervention by the Sarney government. Octávio Pinto Guimarães' victory immersed Brazilian football in a period of instability. During Brazil's participation in the 1986 World Cup, gamblers were accused of interfering in call-ups. In 1987, the CBF claimed financial problems and offered to organize a regionalized Brazilian championship, which led to the creation of the Clube dos 13. The idea of the Copa União with 16 clubs was first rejected by the CBF and then by the courts. In 1988, Ricardo Teixeira formed a consensus candidacy, with the support of João Havelange. He was elected without opponents in January 1989.

Days later, Teixeira, along with the new CBF director, Eurico Miranda, presented the new Brazilian football calendar with a novelty. With the creation of the Copa União in 1987, several clubs from less popular regions that joined the Campeonato Brasileiro by being state champions no longer faced the so-called "big ones", causing a great risk of them going bankrupt. The federations pushed for a new competition, which led to the creation of the Copa do Brasil in 1989, which was played in 46 days.

In 1989, at the Copa America, Brazil would win its first title since 1949. In the 1994 World Cup, the Brazilian team led by Romário would finally win the title again, the fourth in its history, a record until then. In 1998, Brazil would reach the final again, but would be defeated by France 3-0.

In the second half of the decade, teams from the country would win the Copa Libertadores four times; in 1995, Grêmio, and from 1997 to 1999, in order, Cruzeiro, Vasco and Palmeiras, but none of them would win the world title. In 1999, the Copa CONMEBOL became a third tier competition, having been replaced, since 98, by the Copa Mercosur, won by Palmeiras, Flamengo and Vasco in its first editions.

When the 1996 Campeonato Brasileiro ended, Fluminense and Bragantino were relegated. In 1997, TV Globo's Jornal Nacional released recordings of phone calls that would uncover a corruption scheme within the CBF, allegedly involving the sale of football match results. Because of the allegations, the CBF canceled the relegation that year in the so-called Ivens Mendes Case. In the ordinary courts, the case did not go ahead, since the only evidence of crime was pointed out by clandestine recordings, which were considered illegal.

At the end of the decade, CBF president Ricardo Teixeira found himself involved in parliamentary commissions of inquiry in the Chamber of Deputies and the Federal Senate, but with the help of loyal congressmen, he managed to get rid of the accusations. He testified in two CPIs, the football one and the CBF-Nike one.

== 2000s: The exporting nation ==
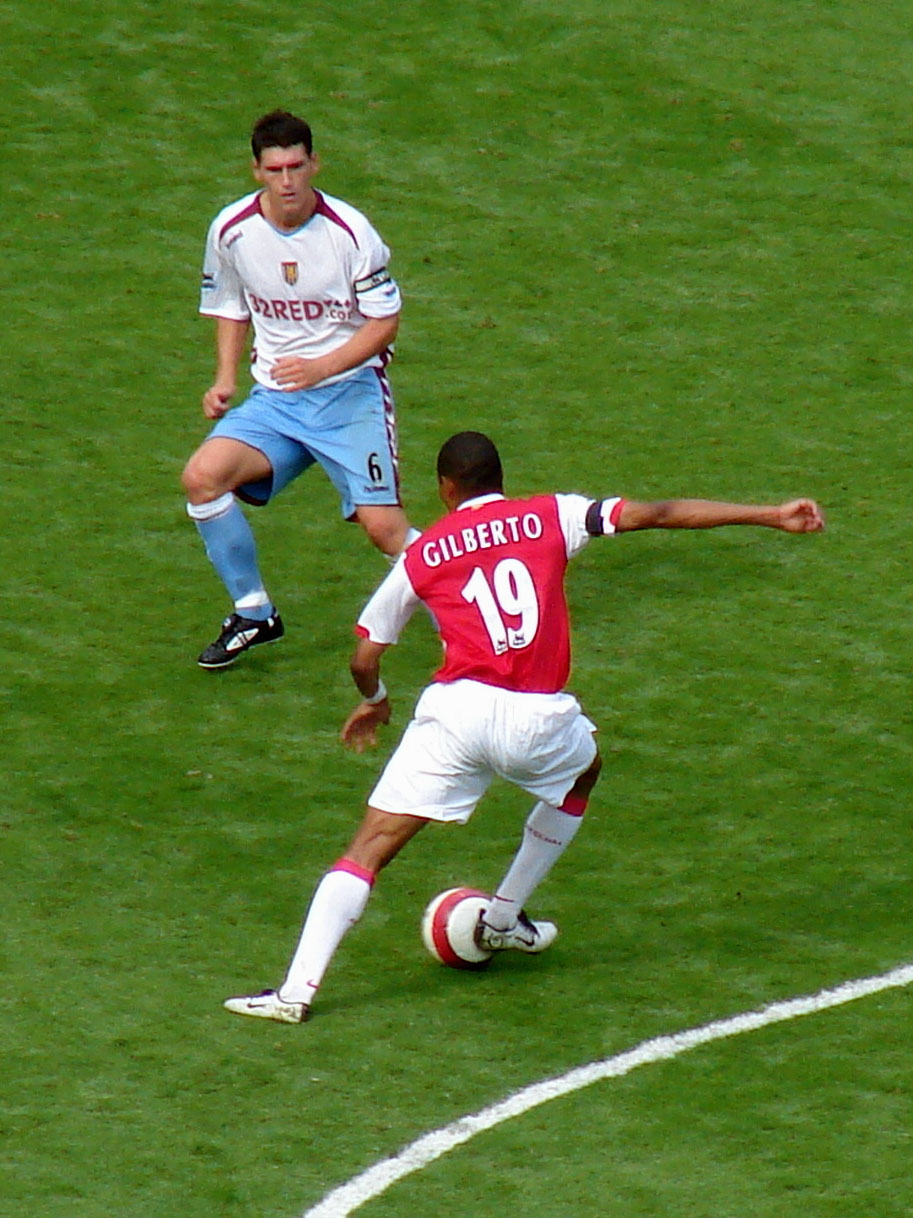
Gilberto Silva in action for Arsenal in the Premier League.

With the advent of the 21st century, there was a strong tendency for Brazilian athletes to leave for European clubs. National clubs were weakened and, since the Pelé Law, lost their autonomy and rights over the players' "passes". Year after year, the number of Brazilian footballers playing for other economically stronger countries increased in all regions of the world. In 2008, an average of 800 players left Brazil to play professionally in other nations. In 2007, 1085 players were involved in international transfers.

The year 2000 began with the 2000 Club World Championship being played in Rio and São Paulo. The winner was Corinthians, who defeated Vasco in the final at the Maracanã stadium.

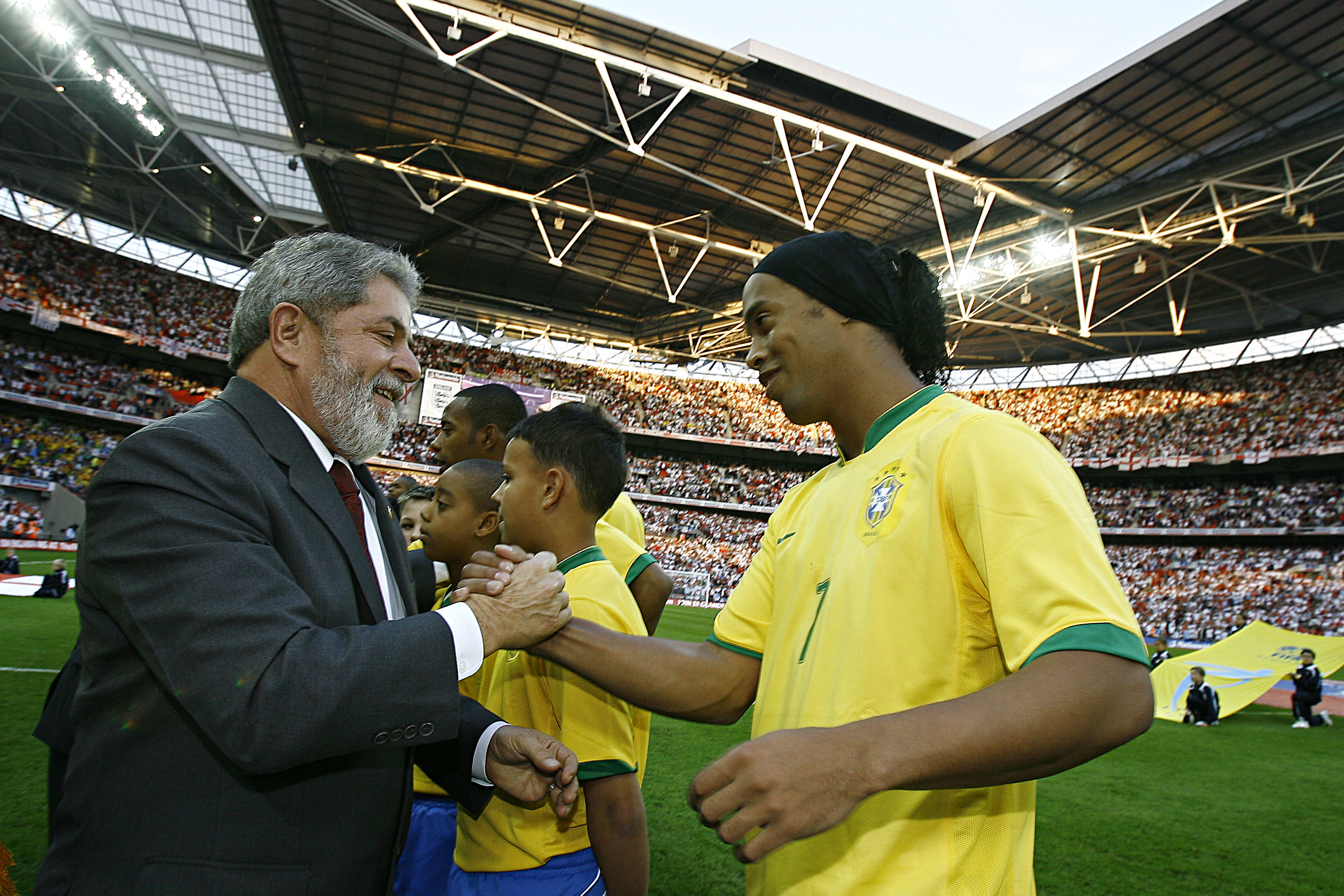
Former president Luiz Inácio Lula da Silva and Ronaldinho greet each other before a match.

In 2002, the Brazilian national team arrived at the World Cup in disrepute due to a troubled preparation. The president of Sport, Luciano Bivar, confessed to offering money to a lobbyist to get Leomar Leiria called up to the national team. However, guided by Ronaldo, Rivaldo and Ronaldinho Gaúcho, among others, the country won its fifth world title.

In the same year, the Copa Sudamericana replaced the Copa Mercosur, but the new continental competition was only joined by Brazil in 2003. To this date, only the clubs Internacional and São Paulo have won it.

In 1999, São Paulo striker Sandro Hiroshi was reported to have played irregularly in the Campeonato Brasileiro. Teams such as Botafogo and Internacional went to court and got the points from the game against São Paulo. Gama, who would not be among the relegated teams if the results achieved by São Paulo on the pitch were maintained, did not accept the situation and went to court against the CBF, leaving the realization of the 2000 championship uncertain. An agreement with Clube dos 13 was the solution and defined that this entity would organize its own championship, which would later be made official by CBF. The Copa João Havelange was played in 2000, bringing together 116 clubs from three divisions in a single tournament, divided into four modules in its first phase.

In 2003, the Campeonato Brasileiro was changed to a two-round competition in which all teams played against each other. This change affected the sport's calendar in the country, extinguishing regional competitions and shortening state ones. São Paulo FC won the tournament on three occasions under the new format, making them the most successful team in the "straight points era" by the end of the decade.

The Club World Cup gained a new format in 2005, which involved winning teams from all continental competitions, inspired by the 2000 edition in Brazil. With the first editions (from 2005 to 2008) played in Japan, São Paulo and Internacional won the first two years, and Corinthians won the tournament in 2012.

In 2005, the Mafia do Apito scandal emerged. A group of investors had "negotiated" with the referee Edílson Pereira de Carvalho (a member of FIFA's staff), to guarantee results on which they had bet on websites. It was discovered that a second referee, Paulo José Danelon, was also involved in the scheme. Eleven games refereed by Edílson in the Campeonato Brasileiro were annulled by the president of the Superior Court of Sports Justice, Luís Zveiter. That year, the champion was Corinthians, who finished 3 points ahead of 2nd placed Internacional. If the original results of the games had been maintained, Internacional would have been the champion. Before the 2005 Campeonato Brasileiro began, Corinthians had signed a million-dollar partnership with investment fund Media Sports Investment.

The Brazilian national football team was eliminated twice in a row in the quarterfinals of the FIFA World Cup in 2006 and 2010. Brazil arrived as favorites in both editions, due to their results in the period between cups, with victories in the 2004 and 2007 Copa América and 2005 and 2009 FIFA Confederations Cup.

== 2010-2020 ==
On October 30, 2007, the International Association Football Federation (FIFA) formalized Brazil as the host of the 2014 FIFA World Cup. Although organizers originally estimated a cost of US$1.1 billion, an estimated US$3.6 billion was spent on stadium renovation and construction. A Datafolha poll taken two months before the tournament began found that only 48% of respondents in Brazil supported the event, a drop from the 79% approval rating in 2008. About 55% of respondents said they believed the event would bring more harm than good to Brazilians. Several protests in Brazil against the 2014 FIFA World Cup were held.

The Brazilian national football team won the 2013 FIFA Confederations Cup and arrived as one of the favorites to win the title on home ground. However, they finished fourth, losing in the semi-final to Germany 7-1 in the match known as "Mineiraço". The result has been described as a national humiliation for Brazil and one of the biggest disgraces of Brazilian football. In 2018, the national team would be eliminated in the quarterfinals of the World Cup. During this period, the team would win three Olympic medals: silver in 2012 and gold in 2016 (first time in its history) and in 2020.

However, there has been a progressive process of elitization of Brazilian stadiums as a result of the changes made for the 2014 World Cup. This is evidenced by the considerable and disproportionate increase in the average ticket price. Due to these social changes, there has been a considerable change in the profile of the fans who attend the stadiums assiduously, resulting in a radical and sudden transformation in cultural traditions typical of Brazilian and South American football and that have marked the lives of many Brazilians.

One of the most dramatic cultural transformations was the replacement of the traditional standing bleachers with the regular seats that previously existed only in special sections of stadiums. Although there were a number of safety and welfare problems for the fans who frequented these sectors, mostly caused by the state's negligence in not inspecting and maintaining old facilities, a large part of the regulars found satisfaction and joy in watching their heart team up close, even if with a little privileged view, for popular prices compatible with the financial reality of most Brazilians.

In 2013, the Bom Senso F.C. movement, created by players from major Brazilian football clubs, emerged demanding better conditions in Brazilian football. The movement collected more than 300 signatures among athletes from the main Brazilian clubs, and determined five basic points to be discussed with the CBF: national football calendar, athletes' vacations, adequate pre-season period, financial fair-play and participation in the technical councils of the entities that govern football. The movement ended in 2016.

Still in 2013, in the last round of the Campeonato Brasileiro of that year, in a game against Grêmio, Portuguesa sent to the field, in the second half, the midfielder Héverton, who had been suspended by the STJD two days earlier. The irregular lineup resulted in the loss of four points and the consequent relegation of the club to Série B in 2014 benefiting Fluminense. The suspicion, which was not confirmed, was that someone from Portuguesa or connected to the team had made the mistake in exchange for money to get the club relegated. Several other decisions on suspended players have had their sentences extended or overturned by the Superior Court of Sports Justice, popularizing the term "tapetão," coined by Washington Rodrigues.

Over the decade, three CBF presidents have been indicted, jailed for corruption or removed. Ricardo Teixeira, who presided over the organization between 1989 and 2012, resigned from the CBF and was banned for corruption by FIFA after it was found that he received R$32.3 million in bribes for the contracts of the Libertadores, the Copa América and the Copa do Brasil. His successor, José Maria Marin, was arrested in Switzerland, along with six other FIFA executives, in an FBI-led investigation. Marin was also banned from any football-related activity by FIFA and removed from the CBF board. In 2014, Marco Polo Del Nero took over CBF, but was banned from football-related activities by FIFA's Ethics Committee in 2017 due to corruption. Elected in 2018, Rogério Caboclo was removed from office after allegations of moral harassment and sexual harassment.

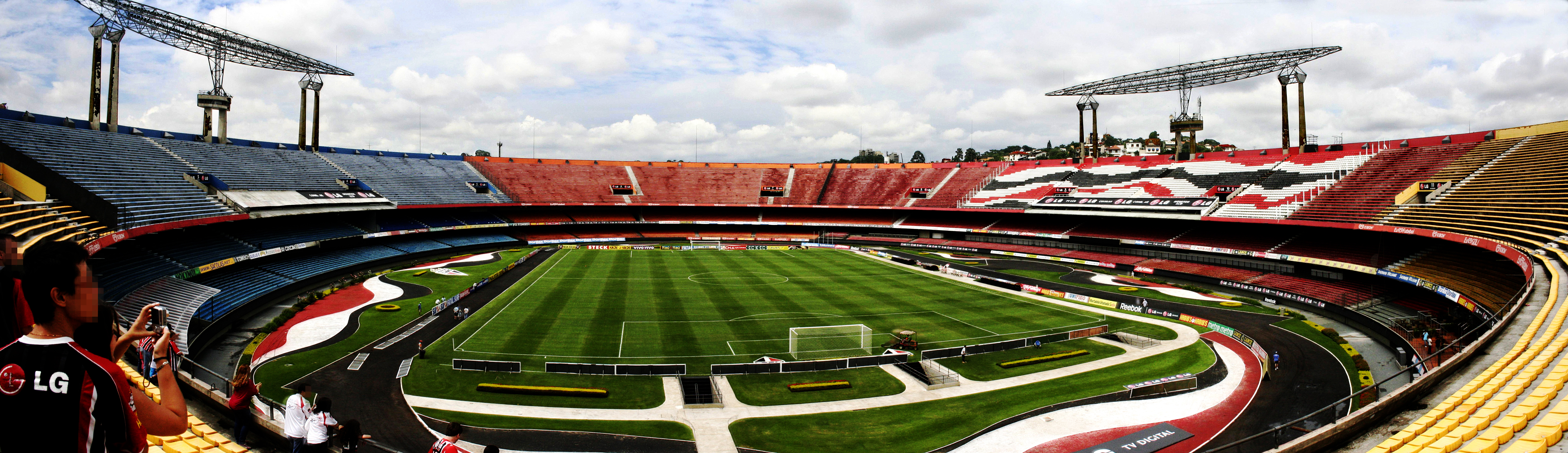
Panorama of the interior of the Morumbi stadium in São Paulo.

== See also ==
- Brazil at the FIFA World Cup
- Blind football
- CP football
- Seven-a-side football
- Beach soccer
- Football Museum
- Football in Brazil
