= 2005 Campeonato Brasileiro Série A =

Annual soccer tournament

Campeonato Brasileiro Série A
- Season: 2005
- Champions: Corinthians; 4th Campeonato Brasileiro title 4th Brazilian title
- Relegated: Coritiba; Atlético Mineiro; Paysandu; Brasiliense
- Copa Libertadores: Corinthians; Internacional; Goiás; Palmeiras; São Paulo (as the Libertadores title holders)
- Copa Sudamericana: Fluminense; Atlético Paranaense; Paraná; Cruzeiro; Botafogo; Santos; Vasco da Gama
- Matches: 462
- Goals: 1,448 (3.13 per match)
- Top goalscorer: Romário (22 goals)
- Average attendance: 17,536

The 2005 Campeonato Brasileiro Série A (officially the Taça Nestlé Brasileirão 2005 for sponsorship reasons) was the 50th edition of the Campeonato Brasileiro Série A, a professional league for men's football clubs in Brazil. The tournament saw Corinthians claim their fourth national title. The season officially kicked off on April 23, 2005, and concluded on December 4.

The tournament was heavily marred by a major match-fixing scandal that resulted in the unprecedented invalidation and replay of 11 matches, significantly altering the final standings.

Romário, the veteran striker of Vasco da Gama, was the top scorer with 22 goals.

Carlos Tevez won the Bola de Ouro and finished third in the top scorers chart with 20 goals.

== The season ==
=== Champion and contenders ===
Pre-season favorites Corinthians captured their fourth national championship despite a turbulent early season and a campaign that went through 3 different head coaches. Key players Carlos Tevez, Carlos Alberto, Roger and Gustavo Nery led the team to 81 points in 42 games. Despite early season turmoil, Corinthians benefited from being one of the few teams in Brazil who could afford to maintain their talent base throughout the season without having to sell key players. The legitimacy of their title was disputed late in the season due to several scandals on and off the field. As 2005 champions, Corinthians received berth into the first round of the Libertadores Cup as well as the South American Cup in 2006.

Internacional executed a strong campaign, finishing with a total of 78 points. Coach Muricy Ramalho led a team with Rafael Sobis, Fernandão, and Tinga to the best performance of any team in the second half, narrowly missing the opportunity for their own fourth national title, but also securing a place in the first round of the Libertadores.

Goiás and Palmeiras qualified for the preliminary stage of the 2006 Copa Libertadores for finishing third and fourth respectively. For Goiás, the third-place finish represented the club's best-ever performance in the Série A.

=== Consolation prize ===
The top middle of the pack was made up of Fluminense, Atlético/PR, Paraná, Cruzeiro, Botafogo, Santos, and São Paulo, who were all awarded allocations in the 2006 Copa Sudamericana; with São Paulo, who could not participate due to Libertadores commitments, ceding their spot to 12th placed Vasco da Gama. Santos in particular saw their season nose-dive as star player Robinho was transferred to Real Madrid mid-season (a similar fate encountered by Cruzeiro as striker Fred was shipped off to Lyon). Atlético/PR and São Paulo both suffered for having to dedicate their primary attention to the 2005 Libertadores Finals.

=== Promotions and relegations ===
The system aiming to reduce the total number of participants, implemented first in 2004, continued its final year this season, with the bottom four teams relegated to Série B being Atlético Mineiro, Coritiba, Paysandu, and the recently promoted Brasiliense. Série B champions Grêmio and runner-up Santa Cruz took their place.

== Controversies ==
The 2005 season was severely disrupted by a major refereeing and match-fixing scandal, later known as "Máfia do Apito" (Whistle Mafia). In September 2005, referee Edílson Pereira de Carvalho was arrested after it was exposed that he had manipulated match outcomes to benefit illegal gambling websites.

As a result of the investigations, the Superior Tribunal de Justiça Desportiva took the unprecedented decision of invalidating and ordering the replay of 11 matches refereed by Carvalho. This decision allowed Corinthians, who replayed two games, to gain crucial points over runners-up Internacional, leading to debates over the fairness of the measures taken.

== Final standings ==
Pos	Team	Pld	W	D	L	GF	GA	GD	Pts	Qualification or relegation
1	Corinthians (Note: As champions, Corinthians retain the right to participate in both libertadores and sudamericana in 2006.)	42	24	9	9	87	59	+28	81	Qualified for the 2006 Copa Libertadores
2	Internacional	42	23	9	10	72	49	+23	78	Qualified for the 2006 Copa Libertadores
3	Goiás	42	22	8	12	68	51	+17	74	Qualified for the 2006 Copa Libertadores
4	Palmeiras	42	20	10	12	81	65	+16	70	Qualified for the 2006 Copa Libertadores
5	Fluminense	42	19	11	12	79	70	+9	68	Qualified for the 2006 Copa Sudamericana
6	Atlético Paranaense	42	18	7	17	76	67	+9	61	Qualified for the 2006 Copa Sudamericana
7	Paraná	42	17	10	15	59	51	+8	61	Qualified for the 2006 Copa Sudamericana
8	Cruzeiro	42	17	9	16	73	72	+1	60	Qualified for the 2006 Copa Sudamericana
9	Botafogo	42	17	8	17	57	56	+1	59	Qualified for the 2006 Copa Sudamericana
10	Santos	42	16	11	15	68	71	−3	59	Qualified for the 2006 Copa Sudamericana
11	São Paulo (Note: Despite qualifying for the Copa Sudamericana, São Paulo cannot participate in 2006 as they are already qualified for the Libertadores as defending champions. The seed has already been reallocated to Vasco da Gama.)	42	16	10	16	77	67	+10	58	Qualified for the 2006 Copa Libertadores
12	Vasco da Gama	42	15	11	16	74	84	−10	56	Qualified for the 2006 Copa Sudamericana
13	Fortaleza	42	16	7	19	58	64	−6	55	
14	Juventude	42	15	10	17	66	72	−6	55	
15	Flamengo	42	14	13	15	56	60	−4	55	
16	Figueirense	42	14	11	17	65	72	−7	53	
17	São Caetano	42	14	10	18	54	60	−6	52	
18	Ponte Preta	42	15	6	21	63	80	−17	51	
19	Coritiba	42	13	10	19	51	60	−9	49	Relegated to the 2006 Campeonato Brasileiro Série B
20	Atlético Mineiro	42	13	8	21	54	59	−5	47	Relegated to the 2006 Campeonato Brasileiro Série B
21	Paysandu	42	12	5	25	63	92	−29	41	Relegated to the 2006 Campeonato Brasileiro Série B
22	Brasiliense	42	10	11	21	47	67	−20	41	Relegated to the 2006 Campeonato Brasileiro Série B

== Statistics ==
=== Top goal scorers ===
Scorer	Goals	Team
Romário	22	Vasco da Gama
Róbson	21	Paysandu
Carlos Tevez	20	Corinthians
Alex Dias	19	Vasco da Gama
Borges	19	Paraná
Rafael Sóbis	19	Internacional

=== Mid-season transactions ===
While the CBF and Clube dos 13 continue to modify the league format in the hopes of decreasing the number of mid-season departures and improve the overall quality of play, the 2006 edition saw a significant number of players depart for Europe and elsewhere.

Team	Player(s) Arriving	Player(s) Departing
Atlético Mineiro	Euller, Luís Mário and Catanha	César Fábio Júnior and André Luiz
Atlético-PR	Finazzi	Aloísio and Felipe Baloy
Botafogo	Zé Roberto, Ruy and Reinaldo	César Prates, Túlio and Jefferson
Brasiliense	Dill	Oséas and Agnaldo
Corinthians	Javier Mascherano and Nilmar	Anderson and Gil
Coritiba	Caio and Renaldo	Rafinha, Fernando and Miranda
Cruzeiro	Alecsandro and Louzada	Fred, Athirson and Ruy
Figueirense	Edmundo and Fernandes	Fábio Mello and Creedence Clearwater
Flamengo	Augusto Recife and César Augusto Ramírez	Henrique and Jean
Fluminense	Dejan Petković and Milton do Ó	Felipe, Fabiano Eller and Antônio Carlos
Fortaleza	Rinaldo and Lúcio	Danilo and Nélio
Goiás	Roni, Dodô and Mário Jardel	Danilo Dias and Válber
Internacional	Iarley, Márcio Mossoró and Wason Rentería	Felipe Soares
Juventude	Caíco and Daniel	Naldo and Túlio Souza
Palmeiras	Marcinho, Washington and Juninho Paulista	Magrão, Osmar, Ricardinho
Paraná	Chiquinho and Maicossuel	Renaldo
Paysandu	Felipe Saad, Carlos Alberto and Luiz Carlos	Flávio Tanajura, Alex Pinho and Luiz Carlos
Ponte Preta	Evando	Harison, Roger and Kahê (sold)
São Caetano	Claudecir, Somália, Edílson	Marcinho
São Paulo	Christian and Roger	Luizão
Vasco da Gama	Adán Vergara, Fábio Braz and Morais	Dominguez, Anderson Costa and Coutinho

== Awards ==
=== Annual awards ===
Award	Winner	Club
Best Player	(Argentina) Carlos Tevez	Corinthians
Top Scorer	(Brazil) Romário	Vasco da Gama
Best Coach	(Brazil) Muricy Ramalho	Internacional
Best Referee	(Brazil) Leonardo Gaciba	—
Special Honouree	(Brazil) Mário Zagallo	—

=== Team of the Year ===
Team of the Year
Goalkeeper	(Brazil) Fábio Costa (Corinthians)		
Defenders	(Brazil) Gabriel (Fluminense)	(Paraguay) Carlos Gamarra (Palmeiras)	(Uruguay) Diego Lugano (São Paulo)
Midfielders	(Brazil) Marcelo Mattos (Corinthians)	(Brazil) Tinga (Internacional)	(Brazil) Roger (Corinthians)
Forwards	(Argentina) Carlos Tevez (Corinthians)	(Brazil) Rafael Sóbis (Internacional)	
