= Aldo =

Aldo may refer to:

- Aldo (given name), male given name
  - Aldo (footballer, born 1957)
  - Aldo (footballer, born 1977)
  - Aldo (footballer, born 1988)
- Aldo Group, a worldwide chain of shoe stores
- Aldosterone in shorthand
- Aldo Bonzi, a town in Argentina
