= Creedence (footballer) =

Brazilian footballer

Personal information
- Full name: Creedence Clearwater Couto
- Date of birth: 6 March 1979 (age 47)
- Place of birth: Ribeirão Preto, São Paulo, Brazil
- Height: 1.92 m (6 ft 3 1/2 in)
- Position: Striker

Senior career*
Years	Team	Apps	(Gls)
2002–2005	Iraty		
2002–2003	→ Guarani (loan)		
2004	→ Brasiliense (loan)		
2005–2009	Tombense		
2005	→ Figueirense (loan)		
2005	→ Lierse (loan)	12	(0)
2006	→ Marília (loan)		
2006	→ Volta Redonda (loan)		
2007	→ Santa Cruz (loan)		
2008	→ Madureira (loan)		
2008	→ Comercial-RP (loan)		
2009	→ Sertãozinho (loan)		
2009–2010	Sertãozinho	0	(0)
2011	Taubaté	10	(4)
2011	Sampaio Corrêa		
2012	Santa Cruz	12	(6)
- * Club domestic league appearances and goals

Creedence Clearwater Couto (born March 6, 1979), known as Creedence and sometimes as Paulista, is a Brazilian former association footballer who played as a striker.

A journeyman, he has spent the majority of his career in the lower reaches of Brazilian football apart from one loan spell at Lierse of Belgium's Pro League in 2005. He also had an unsuccessful trial at Stabæk of Norway in 2006.

== Name ==
He is perhaps best known for his unusual name, which has featured in many articles on extravagant sporting birth names. His parents were fans of the American rock band Creedence Clearwater Revival and decided to adopt this name for their son.
