= Éder Ceccon =

Brazilian footballer

Personal information
- Full name: Éder Ceccon
- Date of birth: 13 April 1983 (age 43)
- Place of birth: Brazil
- Height: 1.84 m (6 ft 1/2 in)
- Position: Striker

Senior career*
Years	Team	Apps	(Gls)
2002	São Paulo		
2003	Vegalta Sendai		
2003	Avaí		
2004	São Paulo		
2004	Santos		
2005	Atlético Sorocaba		
2005	Paysandu		
2006	Juventude		
2006	Konyaspor		
2007	Criciúma		
2008	Marcílio Dias		
2008	Criciúma		
2009	Juventude		
- * Club domestic league appearances and goals

Éder Ceccon (born 13 April 1983) is a Brazilian football player.

== Club statistics ==
Club performance			League		Cup		League Cup		Total	
Season	Club	League	Apps	Goals	Apps	Goals	Apps	Goals	Apps	Goals
Japan			League		Emperor's Cup		J.League Cup		Total	
2003	Vegalta Sendai	J1 League	5	1	0	0	0	0	5	1
Total			5	1	0	0	0	0	5	1
