= Ricardinho (footballer, born May 1976) =

Brazilian footballer and manager

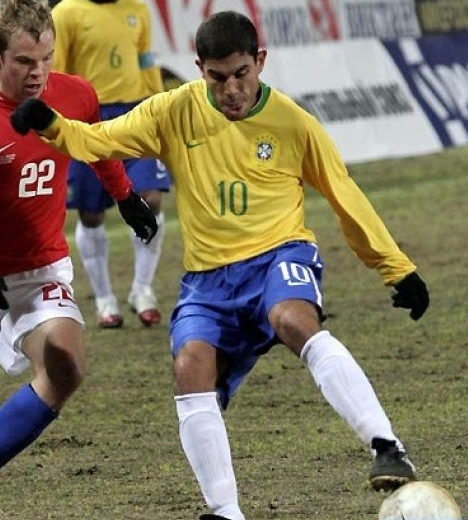
- Ricardinho playing for Brazil in 2006

Personal information
- Full name: Ricardo Luis Pozzi Rodrigues
- Date of birth: 23 May 1976 (age 50)
- Place of birth: São Paulo, Brazil
- Height: 1.76 m (5 ft 9 1/2 in)
- Positions: Winger; attacking midfielder; striker

Senior career*
Years	Team	Apps	(Gls)
1995–1997	Paraná	29	(1)
1997–1998	Bordeaux	18	(1)
1998–2002	Corinthians	121	(28)
2002–2004	São Paulo	41	(4)
2004	Middlesbrough	0	(0)
2004–2005	Santos	72	(21)
2006	Corinthians	8	(1)
2006–2008	Beşiktaş	46	(8)
2008–2009	Al Rayyan	8	(8)
2009–2011	Atlético Mineiro	41	(7)
2011	Bahia	21	(0)
Total		405	(79)

International career
2000–2006	Brazil	22	(1)

Managerial career
- 2012: Paraná
- 2013: Ceará
- 2013: Avaí
- 2014: Paraná
- 2015: Santa Cruz
- 2016: Portuguesa
- 2016: Tupi
- 2018: Londrina
- 2026–: Atlético Dallas (assistant manager)
Medal record
Men's Football
Representing Brazil
FIFA World Cup
Winner	2002 Korea/Japan
- * Club domestic league appearances and goals

Ricardo Luis Pozzi Rodrigues (born 23 May 1976), better known as Ricardinho, is a Brazilian football manager and retired footballer. He's currently assistant manager of Atlético Dallas in the USL Championship.

In his career as a midfielder, he represented teams such as Corinthians, São Paulo and Santos in the Campeonato Brasileiro Série A, winning the league title twice with the former and once with the latter. He also had spells in Europe with Bordeaux, Middlesbrough and Beşiktaş.

A full international with 23 caps for Brazil between 2000 and 2006, Ricardinho was part of the team that won the FIFA World Cup in 2002, also being chosen at the 2006 edition and the 2003 FIFA Confederations Cup. As a manager in the 2010s, he led several clubs in the Campeonato Brasileiro Série B and won the Campeonato Pernambucano with Santa Cruz in 2015.

== Club career ==
=== Early career ===
Born in São Paulo, Ricardinho began his career at Paraná Clube and had one season at FC Girondins de Bordeaux in the French Ligue 1 in 1997–98. He returned to his hometown and joined Sport Club Corinthians Paulista, winning two national titles and the first FIFA Club World Cup in 2000. After the 2002 FIFA World Cup, he transferred to city rivals São Paulo FC, where he partnered international teammate and fellow World Cup winner, Kaká.

=== Middlesbrough ===
After cancelling his deal at the start of the year, Ricardinho returned to Europe on 2 February 2004 when he signed for Middlesbrough for the rest of the Premier League season. He reunited with international teammates Juninho Paulista and Doriva at the club. He played one reserve team game against Wolverhampton Wanderers and manager Steve McClaren suggested he would make the first team for the game against Newcastle United, but he only ever made the substitutes' bench once, against Chelsea. He was released on 22 April after he complained about his lack of playing time; McClaren said that he was signed to cover injuries and suspensions that had since passed.

=== Santos ===
In May 2004, Ricardinho returned to football in the state of São Paulo, signing for Santos FC on a deal until the end of 2005. He was unable to register for the Copa Libertadores due to a documentation deadline. His first goal on 10 July was a last-minute winner in a 2–1 home victory against São Paulo, as his team went on to win the national title. He and teammates Léo (left-back) and Robinho (forward) , also teammates of his at the Brazilian national team, made the Bola da Prata Team of the Year.

Ricardinho totalled 97 games and 28 goal for the Peixe. On 7 September 2005, he scored a hat-trick in a 3–3 draw at Club Athletico Paranaense.

=== Later career ===
In January 2006, Ricardinho returned to Corinthians on a two-year deal. He was one of Media Sport Investment's signings for the club and was given a monthly salary of 250,000 Brazilian reais, compared to the 430,000 of their fellow signing, Argentine international star forward Carlos Tevez.

Ricardinho went for a third spell in European football in August 2006, signing a contract of two years at Beşiktaş J.K. in the Turkish Süper Lig. He reunited with three compatriots, including fellow 2002 World Cup-winning midfielder José Kléberson as well as Márcio Nobre and Bobô, the latter of whom also made the Brazil national team, although only nearly two years after Ricardinho's final match for Brazil. The team won the Turkish Cup in his first season, with a 1–0 extra-time win over Kayseri Erciyesspor. He terminated his deal in March 2008, alleging four months of unpaid wages.

In May 2008, Ricardinho signed another two-year deal, with Al-Rayyan SC of the Qatar Stars League under compatriot manager Paulo Autuori. He returned to Brazil in September 2009, at Clube Atlético Mineiro. In May 2011, he was released by chairman Alexandre Kalil who had alleged that three managers requested his exit; he signed for Esporte Clube Bahia.

== International career ==
Ricardinho earned 23 caps for the Brazil national team. His first on 28 March 2000, as a half-time substitute in a goalless draw away to Colombia in 2002 FIFA World Cup qualification.

Ricardinho was called up by Luiz Felipe Scolari for the 2002 World Cup in South Korea and Japan as a late replacement for the injured Emerson; he made the team at the expense of Alex. He was not expecting to be called up as he had scarcely featured in qualification after Scolari had replaced Vanderlei Luxemburgo; he went to his second home in Curitiba without his passport and attended mass without his mobile phone when he was called up. He appeared in three matches as a substitute during the tournament as Brazil won the World Cup for the record fifth time.

At the 2003 FIFA Confederations Cup in France, Ricardinho was a starter in a Brazil team that failed to advance from a four-team group for the first time since the 1966 FIFA World Cup. Pundit Tim Vickery commented that he struggled with pace, power and defending.

On 17 August 2005, Ricardinho scored his only international goal, equalising with a free kick in a 1–1 friendly draw with Croatia in Split. Brazil coach Carlos Alberto Parreira chose him for the 2006 FIFA World Cup in Germany. He appeared in two matches as a substitute, against Japan and Ghana. In the latter, a minute after coming on for Kaká, he assisted the last goal of a 3–0 win by Zé Roberto.

== Managerial career ==
In January 2012, Ricardinho retired at the age of 35 and became the manager of Paraná, where he had begun playing 17 years earlier. He restored the team to the top flight of the Campeonato Paranaense but resigned in September after a draw against Grêmio Barueri Futebol in the Campeonato Brasileiro Série B.

He resigned as manager of Avaí FC in June 2013 after three successive defeats in the national second divisiom. In September 2014, he returned to Paraná in the same league.

Ricardinho became manager of Santa Cruz Futebol Clube in 2015, winning the Campeonato Pernambucano. He was dismissed in June with the team in the Série B relegation zone.

In February 2016, Ricardinho was appointed at Associação Portuguesa de Desportos. He was fired on 28 March after any possibility of reaching the top division of state football was extinguished. On 21 September, he was tasked with saving Tupi Futebol Clube from relegation from Série B. He resigned with three games to go on 9 November, with the team still in the drop zone.

With two wins and four draws from ten games in the Paraná state league, Ricardinho was dismissed by Londrina Esporte Clube on 8 March 2018.

== Career statistics ==
=== Club ===
Appearances and goals by club, season and competition
Club	Season	League			State league		Cup		Continental		Other		Total	
Club	Season	Division	Apps	Goals	Apps	Goals	Apps	Goals	Apps	Goals	Apps	Goals	Apps	Goals
Paraná	1995	Série A	14	0	–		1	0	–		–		15	0
Paraná	1996	Série A	15	1	–		2	0	–		–		17	1
Paraná	1997	Série A	0	0	10	11	2	1	–		–		12	12
Paraná	Total		29	1	10	11	6	1	–		–		44	13
Bordeaux	1997–98	Division 1	18	1	–		–		–		–		18	1
Corinthians	1998	Série A	22	2	–		–		4	0	–		26	2
Corinthians	1999	Série A	26	7	15	6	5	1	15	3	4	0	65	17
Corinthians	2000	Série A	20	2	14	6	–		16	4	4	1	54	13
Corinthians	2001	Série A	21	7	18	6	10	0	10	2	6	3	65	18
Corinthians	2002	Série A	0	0	1	1	11	3	–		18	6	30	10
Corinthians	Total		89	18	48	19	26	4	45	9	32	10	240	60
São Paulo	2002	Série A	18	3	–		–		–		–		18	3
São Paulo	2003	Série A	23	1	11	1	8	0	3	0	–		45	2
São Paulo	Total		41	4	11	1	8	0	3	0	–		63	5
Santos	2004	Série A	37	10	–		–		4	0	–		41	10
Santos	2005	Série A	35	11	12	1	–		9	6	–		56	18
Santos	Total		72	21	12	1	–		13	6	–		97	28
Corinthians	2006	Série A	8	1	7	1	–		8	1	–		23	3
Beşiktaş	2006–07	Süper Lig	30	6	–		9	1	6	2	–		45	9
Beşiktaş	2007–08	Süper Lig	16	2	–		–		7	0	–		23	2
Beşiktaş	Total		46	8	–		9	1	13	2	–		68	11
Al-Rayyan	2008	Qatar Stars League	8	8	–		–		–		–		8	8
Atlético Mineiro	2009	Série A	12	2	–		–		–		–		12	2
Atlético Mineiro	2010	Série A	29	5	15	0	6	0	2	1	–		52	6
Atlético Mineiro	2011	Série A	0	0	7	0	3	1	–		–		10	1
Atlético Mineiro	Total		41	7	22	0	9	1	2	1	–		74	9
Bahia	2011	Série A	21	0	–		–		–		–		21	0
Career total			373	69	110	33	51	7	84	19	32	10	656	138

=== International ===
Appearances and goals by national team and year
National team	Year	Apps	Goals
Brazil	2000	3	0
Brazil	2001	1	0
Brazil	2002	4	0
Brazil	2003	4	0
Brazil	2004	1	0
Brazil	2005	5	1
Brazil	2006	4	0
Brazil	Total	22	1

== Managerial statistics ==
As of 12 June 2013

Team	From	To	Record^{1}				
Team	From	To	G	W	D	L	Win %
Paraná	18 January 2012	14 September 2012	18	9	6	3	50.00
Avaí	19 March 2013	12 June 2013	19	9	3	7	47.37
Total			37	18	9	10	48.65

- 1.Includes league, cup, state championships and CONMEBOL competitions.

== Honours ==
=== Player ===
Paraná

- Campeonato Paranaense: 1995, 1996, 1997

Corinthians

- Campeonato Brasileiro Série A: 1998, 1999
- Campeonato Paulista: 1999, 2001
- FIFA Club World Championship: 2000
- Copa do Brasil: 2002
- Rio-São Paulo Tournament: 2002

Santos

- Campeonato Brasileiro Série A: 2004

Beşiktaş

- Turkish Cup: 2006–07

Atlético Mineiro

- Campeonato Mineiro: 2010

Brazil

- FIFA World Cup: 2002

Individual

- Bola da Prata: 2004

=== Manager ===
Paraná

- Campeonato Paranaense Série B: 2012

Santa Cruz

- Campeonato Pernambucano: 2015
