= Carlos Frontini =

Argentine footballer (born 1981)

Personal information
- Full name: Carlos Esteban Frontini
- Date of birth: August 19, 1981 (age 45)
- Place of birth: General Pacheco, Argentina
- Height: 1.88 m (6 ft 2 in)
- Position: Centre forward

Senior career*
Years	Team	Apps	(Gls)
2001	Mogi Mirim	12	(0)
2001	Corinthians-AL		
2002	Mogi Mirim	17	(2)
2002	Vitória		
2003	União Barbarense		
2003–2004	Vorskla Poltava	19	(3)
2004	→ Vorskla-2 Poltava	3	(3)
2004	União Barbarense	15	(10)
2005–2008	Marília	10	(10)
2005	→ Ponte Preta (loan)	7	(0)
2005	→ Santos (loan)	8	(1)
2006–2007	→ Pohang Steelers (loan)	38	(8)
2007	→ América-RN (loan)	5	(0)
2007	→ Figueirense (loan)	9	(1)
2008	→ Mirassol (loan)		
2008	Goiás	3	(0)
2008–2009	Botafogo-SP	6	(1)
2009	CRB	4	(0)
2009–2010	Bragantino	28	(9)
2010	Remo	3	(0)
2010	Duque de Caxias	9	(3)
2011	Boavista	17	(10)
2011	Duque de Caxias	3	(0)
2011	Ipatinga	12	(6)
2012	Red Bull Brasil	23	(4)
2012	Brasiliense	9	(4)
2013	Volta Redonda	16	(4)
2013	Vila Nova	16	(8)
2014	Botafogo-PB	28	(16)
2014–2016	Vila Nova	56	(18)
2016–2017	Sergipe	5	(2)
2017	CRAC	11	(4)
2017	XV de Piracicaba	5	(1)
2017–2018	Confiança	42	(13)
2018	Ypiranga de Erechim	9	(1)
2019	Cianorte	9	(0)
2020	Treze	17	(1)
2020	Campinense	2	(0)
2020	Costa Rica	2	(1)
2020–2021	Vila Nova	6	(1)
- * Club domestic league appearances and goals as of 19:52, 19 January 2020 (UTC)

Carlos Esteban Frontini (born August 19, 1981), or simply Frontini, is an Argentine former footballer, who plays as a striker. Frontini also has Brazilian nationality.

He has the record for the player who played for most clubs during his professional career, with 37 different teams.

== Club career ==
During the second semester of 2010, he signed a contract with Clube do Remo to play in the Série D moving in the same year to Duque de Caxias to play in the 2010 Série B.

== Honors ==
- Campeonato Baiano: 2002
- Copa do Nordeste: 2002
- Campeonato Brasileiro Série C: 2004

Vila Nova

- Campeonato Goiano Série B: 2015
- Campeonato Brasileiro Série C: 2015
