= Élton Giovanni =

Brazilian footballer (born 1983)

Personal information
- Full name: Élton Giovanni Machado
- Date of birth: 3 September 1983 (age 43)
- Place of birth: Porto Alegre, Brazil
- Position: Defensive midfielder

Senior career*
Years	Team	Apps	(Gls)
2002–2004	Grêmio	54	(3)
2004–2006	Santos	30	(3)
2006–2007	Deportivo Alavés	3	(0)
2007–2008	Figueirense	13	(0)
2008	Atlético Mineiro	19	(1)
2009	Bahia	20	(1)
2010–2011	Nautico	45	(1)
2012	Ituano	0	(0)
2012	Fortaleza	12	(0)
2013	Alecrim	0	(0)
2013	América-RN		
2014	Brasil de Pelotas	4	(0)
2016	Cruzeiro-RS	3	(0)
2016	Maringá	4	(0)
2016	São Carlos	6	(0)
- * Club domestic league appearances and goals

Élton Giovanni Machado (born 3 September 1983) is a Brazilian former professional footballer.

== Career ==
Born in Porto Alegre, Giovanni began his career with hometown club Grêmio, before moving to Santos. He signed for Spanish side Deportivo Alavés in November 2005, in a contract which began in January 2006. He later played back in Brazil for Figueirense and Atlético Mineiro before moving to Bahia. On 29 April 2010 the Brazilian midfielder, he signed a deal with Clube Náutico Capibaribe between the end of season, the last year played in Bahia.
