= Heleno (footballer, born 1978) =

Brazilian footballer

Personal information
- Full name: Heleno dos Santos Alves
- Date of birth: 23 August 1978 (age 48)
- Place of birth: São Vicente, Brazil
- Height: 1.83 m (6 ft 0 in)
- Position: Defensive midfielder

Youth career
- 1998–1999: São Vicente

Senior career*
Years	Team	Apps	(Gls)
2000–2001	Rio Branco		
2002–2003	América-SP		
2004–2005	Vila Nova		
2005–2006	Santos	30	(0)
2007	Sport Recife	26	(0)
2007–2008	Vila Nova		
2009–2012	Ceará	162	(2)
2013	Rio Verde	8	(1)
2013–2014	Penapolense	34	(0)
2013	→ Fortaleza (loan)	5	(0)
2015	Matonense	8	(0)
- * Club domestic league appearances and goals

Heleno dos Santos Alves (born 23 August 1978), or simply Heleno, is a Brazilian former football defensive midfielder.

== Career ==
He played for São Vicente, SP-America and Vila Nova-GO, where he won the Championship Goiano 2005. That same year, is presented by the Saints and win the Championship in 2006.

Heleno previously played for Santos in the Campeonato Brasileiro.
