= Edimílson =

Brazilian footballer (born 1987)

Personal information
- Full name: Edimílson dos Santos Carmo Júnior
- Date of birth: 15 October 1987 (age 39)
- Place of birth: Santos, Brazil
- Height: 1.75 m (5 ft 9 in)
- Position: Attacking midfielder

Youth career
- 2005: Santos

Senior career*
Years	Team	Apps	(Gls)
2005–2006	Santos	7	(1)
2006	→ Guarani (loan)	2	(0)
2006–2007	Sport Recife		
2007–2009	Portuguesa		
2007–2008	→ Pandurii Târgu Jiu (loan)	1	(0)
2008	→ Belenenses (loan)	0	(0)
2009	→ Olivais Moscavide (loan)	5	(0)
2010	Mika Ashtarak	3	(1)
2010	América de Natal	1	(0)
2011	Oeste	0	(0)
2012	Imperial		
2012–2013	Grêmio Barueri	0	(0)
2013–2014	Sampaio Corrêa		
2016	Bylis Ballsh	7	(0)
2017	Cianorte	0	(0)
2018	Portuguesa Santista	7	(0)
- * Club domestic league appearances and goals

Edimílson dos Santos Carmo Júnior (born 15 October 1987), simply known as Edimílson, is a Brazilian retired footballer who played as an attacking midfielder.

== Honours ==
Santos

- Campeonato Paulista: 2006

Sport Recife

- Campeonato Pernambucano: 2007
