= Alexandre (footballer, born 1984) =

Brazilian footballer

Personal information
- Full name: Alexandre Garcia Ribeiro
- Date of birth: May 8, 1984 (age 42)
- Place of birth: Araçatuba, Brazil
- Height: 1.73 m (5 ft 8 in)
- Position: Striker

Youth career
- 2003–2004: Araçatuba-SP

Senior career*
| Years | Team | Apps | (Gls) |
| 2004 | → Bandeirante (loan) | | |
| 2005 | Araçatuba-SP | | |
| 2005–2008 | Figueirense | 44 | (4) |
| 2006 | → Guaratinguetá (loan) | | |
| 2008 | ABC | | |
| 2009 | Mogi Mirim | | |
| 2009–2010 | Daejeon Citizen | 17 | (0) |
| 2012 | Barretos | | |
- * Club domestic league appearances and goals

Alexandre Garcia Ribeiro (born May 8, 1984), or simply Alexandre, is a Brazilian football striker.

== Career ==
Alexandre began his playing career with Associação Esportiva Araçatuba in Campeonato Paulista Série A3 in 2003.
