= Rogério Conceição =

Brazilian footballer (born 1984)

Personal information
- Full name: Rogério dos Santos Conceição
- Date of birth: 20 September 1984 (age 42)
- Place of birth: Camacan, Brazil
- Height: 1.90 m (6 ft 3 in)
- Position: Centre back

Youth career
- Santacruzense-SP
- Santos

Senior career*
Years	Team	Apps	(Gls)
2004–2008	Santos	24	(1)
2006	→ Guarani (loan)	27	(3)
2007	→ Marília (loan)		
2007	→ Gama (loan)	4	(0)
2007	→ Criciúma (loan)	5	(0)
2008	São Caetano		
2008	Santa Cruz		
2008–2010	Colorado-PR		
2009	→ Veranópolis (loan)	3	(0)
2009	→ Gyeongnam FC (loan)	8	(0)
2010	→ Vila Nova (loan)	7	(1)
2010–2012	Naval	28	(0)
2012–2013	Feirense	5	(0)
2013–2014	Ittihad Tripoli		
2014	Guaratinguetá		
2014	ASA	2	(0)
2016	Avenida	0	(0)
2017	Teixeira de Freitas		
2018	Galícia		
- * Club domestic league appearances and goals

Rogério dos Santos Conceição (born 20 September 1984), known as Rogério Conceição or just Rogério, is a Brazilian retired footballer who played as a central defender.
