= 2005 Brazilian football match-fixing scandal =

Máfia do Apito (literally The Whistle Mafia), sometimes referred to as the Escândalo do Apito (The Whistle Scandal), was the name given by the Brazilian press to the football match-fixing scandal reported by Veja magazine on 23 September 2005.

== Overview ==
Some investors, who were not related to any club, bribed referees Edílson Pereira de Carvalho (a member of the FIFA referee staff) and Paulo José Danelon to fix results according to what was determined by the betting websites Aebet and Futbet. The investors made a deal with Edílson Pereira de Carvalho to fix the results of the matches refereed by him, and then, the investors made millionaire bets on the betting websites. Edílson Pereira de Carvalho said that he agreed to receive R$10,000 (US$4,400) to fix the result of the Brazilian National Championship match between Juventude and Figueirense, and that he was paid between R$10,000 and R$15,000 per fixed match. Edílson Pereira de Carvalho said he accepted the money to fix the results only because he had a R$30,000 debt.

The eleven Brazilian National Championship matches refereed by Edílson Pereira de Carvalho was made null and void by the Supreme Court of Sporting Justice (STJD), presided by Luiz Zveiter, even though Edílson Pereira de Carvalho assured he did not fix all eleven matches. The Supreme Court decided that all eleven matches needed to be replayed. This decision was not popular among the board of directors and supporters of the harmed clubs. Five clubs, which are Ponte Preta, Santos, Internacional, Figueirense and Cruzeiro appealed the decision, but the decision was kept.

On 28 November, Brazilian lawyer Luís Carlos Crema sought a court injunction requesting the cancellation of the decision that annulled the eleven Brazilian National Championship matches, Minister Nancy Andrighi of the Second Section of the Supreme Court of Justice rejected the demand.

However, another lawyer, Leandro Konrad Konflanz sought a lawsuit requesting the annulment of the replayed matches. If those matches are annulled, Internacional would win the competition, instead of Corinthians. The decision was that no club should be announced as champion during the dawn of Sunday, 5 December. CBF, ignoring the decision, on 6 December, declared Corinthians as the 2005 Campeonato Brasileiro champion. Judge Munira Hanna of the First Civil Court of Porto Alegre dispatched a temporary restraining order obligating the CBF to obey that decision. However, FIFA and CBF rules forbid clubs to petition regular courts of justice (courts that are not dedicated to sporting arbitration) when the claim is directly related to a match, as was the case; thus, on 7 December, Internacional's chairman, Fernando Carvalho, made a request to lawyer Konflanz to withdraw the lawsuit, which he did on 9 December.

Four Brazilian Second Division first stage matches were refereed by Paulo José Danelon. These matches were not annulled.

Paulo José Danelon and Edílson Pereira de Carvalho, together, refereed 22 Paulista Championship matches. None of these matches has been annulled, including two of them which were initially considered suspected of being fixed. Both suspected matches were refereed by Paulo José Danelon. The São Paulo Football Sporting Justice Court's Inquiry Court, after analyzing all the 22 matches, concluded that no matches were fixed, with the exception of the two suspected matches. Even after coming to the conclusion that these two matches were fixed, the São Paulo Football Sporting Justice Court decided that the results should be kept.

Edílson Pereira de Carvalho was banned for life by the STJD's First Disciplinary Commission. Paulo José Danelon was removed from the referee staff of Paulista Football Federation. On 31 October 2005, the São Paulo Football Sporting Justice Court's First Disciplinary Commission banned for life both Edilson Pereira de Carvalho and Paulo José Danelon. So, they are prohibited from refereeing Paulista football competitions matches. Both Edílson Pereira de Carvalho and Paulo José Danelon face charges of fraud, conspiracy and crimes against the economy. The entrepreneur Nagib Fayad (nicknamed Gibão), suspected of commanding the gambling ring in Piracicaba was arrested on 25 September.

== Brazilian National Championship Matches annulled by STJD ==
Date	Annulled Match	Score	Date of the Match Replay	Score of the Match Replay
8 May	Vasco - Botafogo	0–1	19 October	1–0
2 July	Ponte Preta - São Paulo	1–0	19 October	2–0
July 16	Paysandu - Cruzeiro	1–2	19 October	4–1
24 July	Juventude - Figueirense	1–4	19 October	2–2
31 July	Santos - Corinthians	4–2	13 October	2–3
7 August	Vasco - Figueirense	2–1	12 October	3–3
10 August	Cruzeiro - Botafogo	4–1	12 October	2–2
14 August	Juventude - Fluminense	2–0	12 October	3–4
21 August	Internacional - Coritiba	3–2	28 October	3–2
7 September	São Paulo - Corinthians	3–2	24 October	1–1
10 September	Fluminense - Brasiliense	3–0	24 October	1–1

== Brazilian Second Division matches refereed by Danelon ==
Date	Match	Score
8 May	Paulista - Guarani	4–0
10 June	Portuguesa - Ituano	0–4
9 July	Guarani - Santo André	2–1
13 August	Ituano - Marília	2–1

== Suspected Paulista Championship matches ==
Date	Match	Score
13 March	Guarani - Atlético Sorocaba	1–1
3 April	Portuguesa Santista - União São João	0–1

== See also ==
- Golden Whistle: Portuguese football corruption scandal
- 2005 Bundesliga scandal in Germany
- 2006 Serie A scandal in Italy
- 2011 Turkish sports corruption scandal
