= Ruy Cabeção =

Brazilian football coach and former right-back

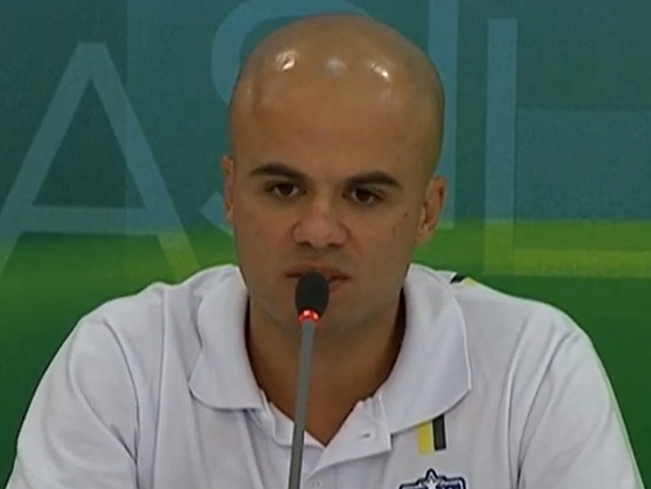

Personal information
- Full name: Ruy Bueno Neto
- Date of birth: April 11, 1978 (age 48)
- Place of birth: Belo Horizonte, Brazil
- Height: 1.75 m (5 ft 9 in)
- Position: Right back

Youth career
- América Mineiro

Senior career*
Years	Team	Apps	(Gls)
2000–2001	América Mineiro		
2002–2006	Cruzeiro		
2003	→ Guarani (loan)		
2004–2006	→ Botafogo (loan)		
2007	Figueirense		
2008	Náutico		
2009	Grêmio		
2009–2010	Fluminense		
2010	→ Boavista (loan)		
2010–2012	Brasiliense		
2012	Ipatinga		
2012	Brasiliense		
2013	Alecrim		
2013	→ América de Natal (loan)		
2014	Mixto		
2014–2015	Operário-MT		
- * Club domestic league appearances and goals

Ruy Bueno Neto (born 11 April 1978) and known as Ruy Cabeção, is a Brazilian retired association footballer who played as a right-back.

== Club career ==
Ruy came through América Mineiro’s youth system and was part of the squad that won the inaugural Copa Sul-Minas in 2000 and the 2001 Campeonato Mineiro. He signed with Cruzeiro in 2002 and had loan spells with Guarani in 2003 and Botafogo between 2004 and 2005.

In early 2007, Ruy was close to a move to D.C. United in the United States on a proposed three-year contract, but the parties did not reach an agreement. He then moved to Figueirense, becoming part of the team that finished runners-up in the 2007 Copa do Brasil.

Cabeção joined Náutico for the 2008 season. The following year, he moved to Grêmio, but remained there only until July 2009, when he transferred to Fluminense.

In January 2010, Fluminense loaned him to Boavista for the state season. He then signed with Brasiliense from 2010 to 2012, briefly joined Ipatinga in 2012 before returning to Brasiliense. He moved to Alecrim in early 2013—an agreement that gained attention because he had openly sought a club via social media. Later that year he was briefly loaned to América de Natal before returning to Alecrim.

In 2014 he played for Mixto and then Operário-MT. In June 2015, at age 37, he announced his retirement, citing disenchantment with the domestic game’s conditions and a desire to focus on family and studies.

== Post-playing and coaching ==
Following retirement, Ruy graduated in Law and worked as a lawyer, a move that drew media attention when his office résumé highlighted titles won during his playing career.

In January 2025 he was appointed head coach of Inter de Minas’ under-20 team for the 2025 Copa São Paulo de Futebol Júnior.

== Honours ==
América Mineiro

- Copa Sul-Minas: 2000
- Campeonato Mineiro: 2001

Figueirense

- Copa do Brasil runner-up: 2007

Fluminense

- Copa Sudamericana runner-up: 2009

Brasiliense

- Campeonato Brasiliense: 2011
