= 2001 Campeonato Mineiro =

Campeonato Mineiro de Futebol do Módulo I
- Season: 2001
- Champions: América (15th title)
- Relegated: Democrata; Guarani
- 2002 CB: América; Cruzeiro; Atlético
- 2001 Série C: Villa Nova; Ipatinga; Mamoré; Uberlândia
- 2002 Sul-Minas: América; Cruzeiro; Atlético; Mamoré
- Matches: 92
- Goals: 242 (2.63 per match)
- Top goalscorer: Guilherme (Atlético) - 10 goals
- Biggest home win: Ipatinga 5-0 Uberlândia (March 3, 2001)
- Biggest away win: Rio Branco 0-3 Atlético (February 4, 2001); Uberlândia 0-3 Atlético (March 14, 2001)
- Highest scoring: Villa Nova 5-2 Guarani (March 4, 2001); Democrata 4-3 Villa Nova (March 25, 2001)

The 2001 Campeonato Mineiro de Futebol do Módulo I was the 87th season of Minas Gerais's top-flight professional football league. The season began on January 27 and ended on June 3. América won the championship, winning the title for the 15th time.

== Participating teams ==
Locations of the 2001 Módulo I teams

Club	Home city	Previous season
América	Belo Horizonte	3rd
Atlético	Belo Horizonte	1st
Caldense	Poços de Caldas	10th
Cruzeiro	Belo Horizonte	2nd
Democrata	Governador Valadares	8th
Guarani	Divinópolis	2nd (Second level)
Ipatinga	Ipatinga	4th
Mamoré	Patos de Minas	1st (Second level)
Rio Branco	Andradas	6th
Uberlândia	Uberlândia	9th
URT	Patos de Minas	7th
Villa Nova	Nova Lima	5th

== System ==
The championship would have three stages.:

- First phase: The twelve teams all played in a single round-robin tournament, with the eight best teams qualifying to the Second phase and the two worst teams being relegated.
- Second phase: The eight remaining teams were divided into two groups of four; the teams played the teams of their own group in a double round-robin tournament, with the best team in each group advancing to the Finals.
- Finals: The group winners of the Second phase played in a two-legged tie to define the Champions. This was the first time these rival teams had played against one another in 22 years.

== League table ==
=== First phase ===
Pos	Team	Pld	W	D	L	GF	GA	GD	Pts	Qualification or relegation
1	Atlético	11	6	3	2	17	8	+9	21	Qualified to Second phase
2	Cruzeiro	11	6	2	3	20	12	+8	20	Qualified to Second phase
3	Mamoré	11	6	2	3	18	15	+3	20	Qualified to Second phase
4	Ipatinga	11	5	2	4	18	9	+9	17	Qualified to Second phase
5	América	11	5	2	4	16	13	+3	17	Qualified to Second phase
6	Villa Nova	11	5	2	4	18	16	+2	17	Qualified to Second phase
7	Caldense	11	5	1	5	12	16	−4	16	Qualified to Second phase
8	Rio Branco	11	4	4	3	12	13	−1	16	Qualified to Second phase
9	URT	11	5	0	6	12	13	−1	15	
10	Uberlândia	11	4	1	6	7	16	−9	13	
11	Democrata	11	3	2	6	11	14	−3	11	Relegated
12	Guarani	11	1	1	9	9	25	−16	4	Relegated

Updated to match(es) played on April 8, 2001. Source: RSSSF.com
Rules for classification: 1) points; 2) wins; 3) goal difference; 4) number of goals scored.

=== Second phase ===
==== Group A ====
Pos	Team	Pld	W	D	L	GF	GA	GD	Pts	Qualification or relegation
1	Atlético	6	3	1	2	12	8	+4	10	Qualified to Finals
2	Villa Nova	6	3	1	2	10	8	+2	10	
3	Mamoré	6	2	2	2	7	10	−3	8	
4	Rio Branco	6	1	2	3	3	6	−3	5	

Updated to match(es) played on May 20, 2001. Source: RSSSF.com
Rules for classification: 1) points; 2) wins; 3) goal difference; 4) number of goals scored.

==== Group B ====
Pos	Team	Pld	W	D	L	GF	GA	GD	Pts	Qualification or relegation
1	América	6	4	0	2	9	5	+4	12	Qualified to Finals
2	Cruzeiro	6	3	1	2	8	7	+1	10	
3	Caldense	6	2	1	3	7	11	−4	7	
4	Ipatinga	6	2	0	4	8	9	−1	6	

Updated to match(es) played on May 20, 2001. Source: RSSSF.com
Rules for classification: 1) points; 2) wins; 3) goal difference; 4) number of goals scored.

=== Copa Sul-Minas qualfiication table ===
Pos	Team	Pld	W	D	L	GF	GA	GD	Pts	Qualification or relegation
1	Atlético	17	9	4	4	29	16	+13	31	Qualified to 2002 Copa Sul-Minas
2	Cruzeiro	17	9	3	5	28	19	+9	30	Qualified to 2002 Copa Sul-Minas
3	América	17	9	2	6	25	18	+7	29	Qualified to 2002 Copa Sul-Minas
4	Mamoré	17	8	4	5	25	25	0	28	Qualified to 2002 Copa Sul-Minas
5	Villa Nova	17	8	3	6	28	24	+4	27	
6	Ipatinga	17	7	2	8	26	18	+8	23	
7	Caldense	17	7	2	8	19	27	−8	23	
8	Rio Branco	17	5	6	6	15	19	−4	21	

Updated to match(es) played on May 20, 2001. Source: RSSSF.com
Rules for classification: 1) points; 2) wins; 3) goal difference; 4) number of goals scored.

== Finals ==
América claimed the championship, while Atlético remained the club team with the highest number of league titles.

Team 1	Agg.	Team 2	1st leg	2nd leg
América	5–4	Atlético	4–1	1–3

=== First leg ===
2001-05-27
16:00 (UTC-3)

América	4 – 1	Atlético
Wellington Paulo 4'; Tucho 17'; Rodrigo 28' 83'		Gilberto Silva 29'

Mineirão, Belo Horizonte
Attendance: 22,391
Referee: Paulo César de Oliveira

=== Second leg ===
2001-06-03
16:00 (UTC-3)

Atlético	3 – 1	América
Guilherme 12'; Gilberto Silva 55'; Lincoln 62'		Alessandro 77'

Mineirão, Belo Horizonte
Attendance: 46,934
Referee: Paulo César de Oliveira

Campeonato Mineiro
2001 champion

15th title
