= Rossini (footballer) =

Brazilian footballer (born 1985)

Personal information
- Full name: Rossini Alberto dos Santos
- Date of birth: 31 March 1985 (age 41)
- Place of birth: Santos, São Paulo, Brazil
- Position: Midfielder

Senior career*
Years	Team	Apps	(Gls)
2004	Red Bull Bragantino		
2005	Santos FC	11	(0)
2006	Associação Atlética Portuguesa	2	(0)
2007	Rio Branco Esporte Clube	11	(1)
2007	Imperatriz		
2008	Portuguesa Londrinense		
2008	Treze Futebol Clube	3	(0)
2008	Rio Branco Football Club	2	(0)
2009	Paysandu Sport Club	4	(0)
2009	Santa Cruz Futebol Clube		
2010	Esporte Clube Internacional	1	(0)
2010	Luverdense Esporte Clube	1	(0)
2010	Moto Club de São Luís	2	(0)
2011	São José Esporte Clube	15	(1)
2011	Rio Branco Football Club	6	(0)
2012	São José Esporte Clube	12	(2)
2012	Icasa	23	(3)
2013	Associação Atlética Caldense	10	(1)
2013	Guarani FC	15	(0)
2014	Mogi Mirim Esporte Clube	2	(0)
2014	Rio Branco Esporte Clube	6	(2)
2014	Esporte Clube São Bento	8	(0)
2015	Lemense Futebol Clube	8	(3)
2015	Clube Atlético Cambé	2	(0)
2016	Sertãozinho Futebol Clube	10	(0)
2017	São Carlos Clube	17	(1)
2017	Central Sport Club	1	(0)
2018–2020	Manaus Futebol Clube	74	(15)
2018	→ Jataiense (loan)		
2020–2021	Interporto Futebol Clube	5	(1)
2021	São Raimundo Esporte Clube	6	(2)
2021	Nacional Fast Clube	12	(0)
2022	São Raimundo Esporte Clube	11	(1)
2022	Associação Esportiva Real	5	(1)
2022	Unidos do Alvorada Esporte Clube	6	(2)
- * Club domestic league appearances and goals

Rossini Alberto dos Santos (born 31 March 1985) is a Brazilian former footballer who played as a midfielder.

== Career ==
Rossini started his career with Brazilian side Santos FC. He played in the Copa Libertadores while playing for the club.

In 2022, Rossini signed for Brazilian side Associação Esportiva Real. He helped the club achieve second place at the 2022 Campeonato Roraimense.

== Style of play ==
Rossini mainly operated as a midfielder. He received comparisons to Brazil international Robinho.

== Personal life ==
Rossini has been a Christian. He is a native of São Paulo, Brazil.
