= Gavião (footballer) =

Brazilian footballer (born 1980)

Personal information
- Full name: Carlos Alberto Rodrigues Gavião
- Date of birth: February 2, 1980 (age 46)
- Place of birth: Itaqui, Brazil
- Height: 1.80 m (5 ft 11 in)
- Position: Midfielder

Senior career*
Years	Team	Apps	(Gls)
2004	Júbilo Iwata		
- * Club domestic league appearances and goals

Carlos Alberto Rodrigues Gavião (born February 2, 1980), known as just Gavião, is a Brazilian football player.

== Club statistics ==
Club performance			League		Cup		League Cup		Total	
Season	Club	League	Apps	Goals	Apps	Goals	Apps	Goals	Apps	Goals
Japan			League		Emperor's Cup		J.League Cup		Total	
2004	Júbilo Iwata	J1 League	1	0	0	0	2	0	3	0
Total			1	0	0	0	2	0	3	0
