= Evando =

Brazilian footballer and manager (born 1977)

Personal information
- Full name: Evando Spinassé Camillato
- Date of birth: 7 March 1977 (age 49)
- Place of birth: Timóteo, Brazil
- Height: 1.79 m (5 ft 10 1/2 in)
- Position: Forward

Youth career
- 1993–1994: Vitória

Senior career*
Years	Team	Apps	(Gls)
1995–2000	Vitória	16	(1)
1997	→ Villarreal (loan)	4	(0)
1998–1999	Vitória Guimarães	27	(7)
1999	→ Goiás (loan)	20	(4)
2000–2004	Vitória Guimarães	26	(3)
2001	→ Santa Cruz (loan)	16	(2)
2002	→ Portuguesa Santista (loan)	?	(1)
2002–2004	→ Estrela Amadora (loan)	32	(9)
2004	Avaí	27	(9)
2005	Santos	0	(0)
2005	Ponte Preta	24	(8)
2006	Fluminense	20	(3)
2007	Avaí	1	(0)
2007	Al-Shamal	13	(10)
2008–2009	Avaí	26	(11)
2009	Ponte Preta	30	(9)
2010	Mirassol	12	(5)
2010	Náutico	14	(2)
2011	Avaí	0	(0)
2012	Ituano	7	(1)
2012	Grêmio Barueri	0	(0)
2012	Avaí	9	(2)
Total		324	(87)

International career
1996	Brazil U20		

Managerial career
- 2015–2019: Avaí (assistant)
- 2016: Avaí (interim)
- 2019: Avaí
- * Club domestic league appearances and goals

Evando Spinassé Camillato (born 7 March 1977), commonly known as Evando, is a Brazilian professional football manager and former player.

== Playing career ==
Evando was born in Timóteo, Minas Gerais, but represented Vitória as a youth. He made his first team debut during the 1995 season in the Série A, aged only 18.

In January 1997, Evando moved abroad and joined Spanish Segunda División side Villarreal CF on loan until June. He made his debut abroad on 23 February by starting in a 3–1 home win against CD Toledo, but only featured in three further matches before returning to his parent club.

In 1998, Evando joined Vitória de Guimarães of the Primeira Liga on loan for one year. Upon returning, he spent a six-month spell at Goiás also in a temporary deal before being bought outright by the Portuguese side in early 2000.

Evandro rarely settled into a team in the following campaigns, being loaned to Santa Cruz, Portuguesa Santista and Estrela Amadora before leaving Vitória in 2004 as his contract expired. He immediately returned to Brazil and signed for Avaí.

On 12 January 2005, after scoring nine goals in the previous campaign, Evando signed for Santos, but left the club in May and joined Ponte Preta. In December, he agreed to a deal with Fluminense.

Evando returned to Avaí for 2007, but soon moved abroad and joined Al-Shamal. In the following year, he rejoined his previous club for a third spell, before moving back to Ponte in June 2009. He then represented Mirassol and Náutico before rejoining Avaí in February 2011.

In 2012, after representing Ituano and Grêmio Barueri during the year, Evando retired at the age of 35 with his main club Avaí.

== Coaching career ==
Immediately after retiring Evando continued to work for his last club Avaí, helping in the coordination of the club's football schools across the Santa Catarina state. Ahead of the 2015 season, he became the club's permanent assistant manager.

On 22 August 2016, after the dismissal of Silas, Evando was named interim manager for one match; he returned to his previous duties after the arrival of Claudinei Oliveira. On 13 October 2019, after manager Alberto Valentim moved to Botafogo, he was permanently appointed manager of the main squad.

== Honours ==
=== Player ===
==== Club ====
Vitória

- Campeonato Baiano: 1995, 1996

Goiás

- Campeonato Brasileiro Série B: 1999

Avaí

- Campeonato Catarinense: 2009, 2012

==== International ====
Brazil U20

- Toulon Tournament: 1996
