= Fábio Braz =

Brazilian footballer (born 1978)

Personal information
- Full name: Fábio Braz do Nascimento
- Date of birth: 2 December 1978 (age 47)
- Place of birth: São Paulo, Brazil
- Height: 1.89 m (6 ft 2 1/2 in)
- Position: Defender

Senior career*
Years	Team	Apps	(Gls)
2001	Anapolina		
2001–2002	Criciúma		
2002–2003	15 de Novembro		
2003–2003	Paraná		
2004–2005	Mogi Mirim		
2005–2005	Guarani		
2005–2007	Vasco da Gama		
2007–2008	Corinthians		
2008–2009	Boavista		
2009–2010	America	11	(0)
2010–2011	Duque de Caxias	15	(0)
2010	→ Brasiliense (loan)	17	(1)
2012	Boavista	6	(1)
2012	Guaratinguetá	4	(0)
2012–2014	Brasiliense	20	(0)
2015–2016	America-RJ		
2017	Madureira	1	(0)
2018	Barra da Tijuca		
- * Club domestic league appearances and goals

Fábio Braz do Nascimento (born 2 December 1978) is a Brazilian former footballer who played as a defender.

Fábio Braz played for Vasco da Gama and Corinthians in the Campeonato Brasileiro.

Fábio Braz played for many clubs throughout Brazil, enjoying success with Vasco da Gama and later after joining Brasiliense in 2012.
