= Aldo (footballer, born 1977) =

Brazilian footballer

Personal information
- Full name: Aldo César da Silva
- Date of birth: January 9, 1977 (age 49)
- Place of birth: Araguari, Brazil
- Height: 1.87 m (6 ft 2 in)
- Position: Centre-back

Youth career
- 1996: Atlético Mineiro

Senior career*
Years	Team	Apps	(Gls)
1997–1998	Atlético Mineiro		
1999	Ituano		
1999–2000	Botafogo-SP	1	(0)
2000	Portuguesa-SP	1	(0)
2001	Figueirense		
2001	América-MG	13	(0)
2002–2003	Brasiliense		
2005–2006	→ Santa Clara (loan)	47	(2)
2006–2007	Goiás	27	(4)
2007–2008	→ Santa Cruz (loan)		
- * Club domestic league appearances and goals

Aldo César da Silva (born January 9, 1977), or simply Aldo, is a Brazilian former professional footballer who played as a centre-back.
