= Edílson Pereira de Carvalho =

Brazilian football referee

Edílson Pereira de Carvalho (born August 4, 1962) is a former international football referee. Born in Jacareí and being a religious man, his pre-match ritual was to raise his two football cards (yellow and red), both personalized with the inscription Deus é Fiel, which means God is Faithful, and pray in the center of the pitch. He became notorious as to his involvement in a match-fixing scandal. He is married and has a daughter.

== Youth ==
When he was younger, he tried to become a football player, and made a test at São José, but never signed a contract.

== Refereeing career ==
In 1991, he became a referee. Three years later, he refereed his first official match, a Campeonato Paulista game.

He became an international referee in 2000, one year after he was appointed by Armando Marques, who was the president of the Brazilian Football Confederation Refereeing Commission at the time; he replaced referee Dacildo Mourão. He worked in important competitions such as Campeonato Brasileiro Série A, Campeonato Paulista, and international competitions such as Copa Libertadores and Copa Sudamericana, but never refereed a Football World Cup match.

Among the most famous matches he worked were both legs of the 2000 Copa Libertadores semifinal tie between Corinthians and Palmeiras.

He was one of the main figures in the 2005 Brazilian football match-fixing scandal, where he received between R$10,000 and R$15,000 per fixed match. Eleven Brazilian National Championship matches refereed by him were annulled, and needed to be replayed. He was suspended on September 24, 2005, and was later banned for life. He also faced charges of fraud, conspiracy and crimes against the economy. He confirmed that he committed those crimes, but stated that he only did so because he was R$40,000 in debt.
