= History of West Ham United F.C. =

History of an English football club

See also List of West Ham United F.C. seasons

West Ham United Football Club are based in Stratford, Newham, east London. They played home matches at the Boleyn Ground in Upton Park between 1904 and 2016, and moved to the London Stadium for the start of the 2016–17 season.

The club's formative roots stretch back to their formation as a professional side in 1900, but existed for at least five years prior to this under the name Thames Ironworks F.C. who themselves were built upon the remains of Old Castle Swifts F.C. (a club formed in 1892).

The club initially competed in the London League (Winners 1897–98) later joining the Southern League (Division 2 Champions 1898–99) and Western League (Western League Champions in 1907–08) before joining the full Football League in 1919. They enjoyed their first top flight season in 1923 and have never fallen outside the top two divisions. They have won the FA Cup three times: in 1964, 1975, and 1980, and have also been runners-up twice, in 1923 and 2006. The club have reached two major European finals, winning the European Cup Winners Cup in 1965 and finishing runners up in the same competition in 1976. West Ham also won the Intertoto Cup in 1999. The club were inaugural winners of the War Cup in 1940. Their best finish in the top flight was a third-place finish in 1986. West Ham have been runners up twice in the Football League Cup in 1966 and 1981, and shared the 1964 Charity Shield

They were awarded the 1965 BBC Sports Personality of the Year Team Award in honour of their European Cup Winners Cup win.

== Early years ==
The football club's roots lie in the shipbuilding industry of Blackwall and Canning Town, and this has contributed to West Ham's history being one of the most written about in English football. Unfortunately many of the primary sources were lost in a fire resulting from a V-1 flying bomb landing on the clubs Boleyn Ground home in 1944.

=== Shipbuilding roots ===
West Ham United grew from the largest and last surviving shipbuilder on the Thames, the Thames Ironworks, which was based on either bank of the Lea, at Bow Creek where the Lea meets the Thames. The Thames Ironworks had an initial base at Leamouth, Blackwall and expanded to include a much larger site on the Canning Town side.

Blackwall, in Poplar, was traditionally part of the Tower division of Middlesex, while the Canning Town area of West Ham was then part of Essex. The repair yard of the Castle Shipping Line was a very near neighbour on the Blackwall side, and their work team, initially known as the Castle Swifts, would informally merge with the Thames Ironworks own team.

There had been a shipbuilding industry in Blackwall since at least 1485, and in 1838 the Ditchburn & Mare company moved their premises to Blackwall, taking on the yard and presumably some of the workforce of the recently closed shipbuilder William & Benjamin Wallis. By 1855 Ditchburn & Mare were bankrupt, but refinanced as the Thames Ironworks and Shipbuilding Company.

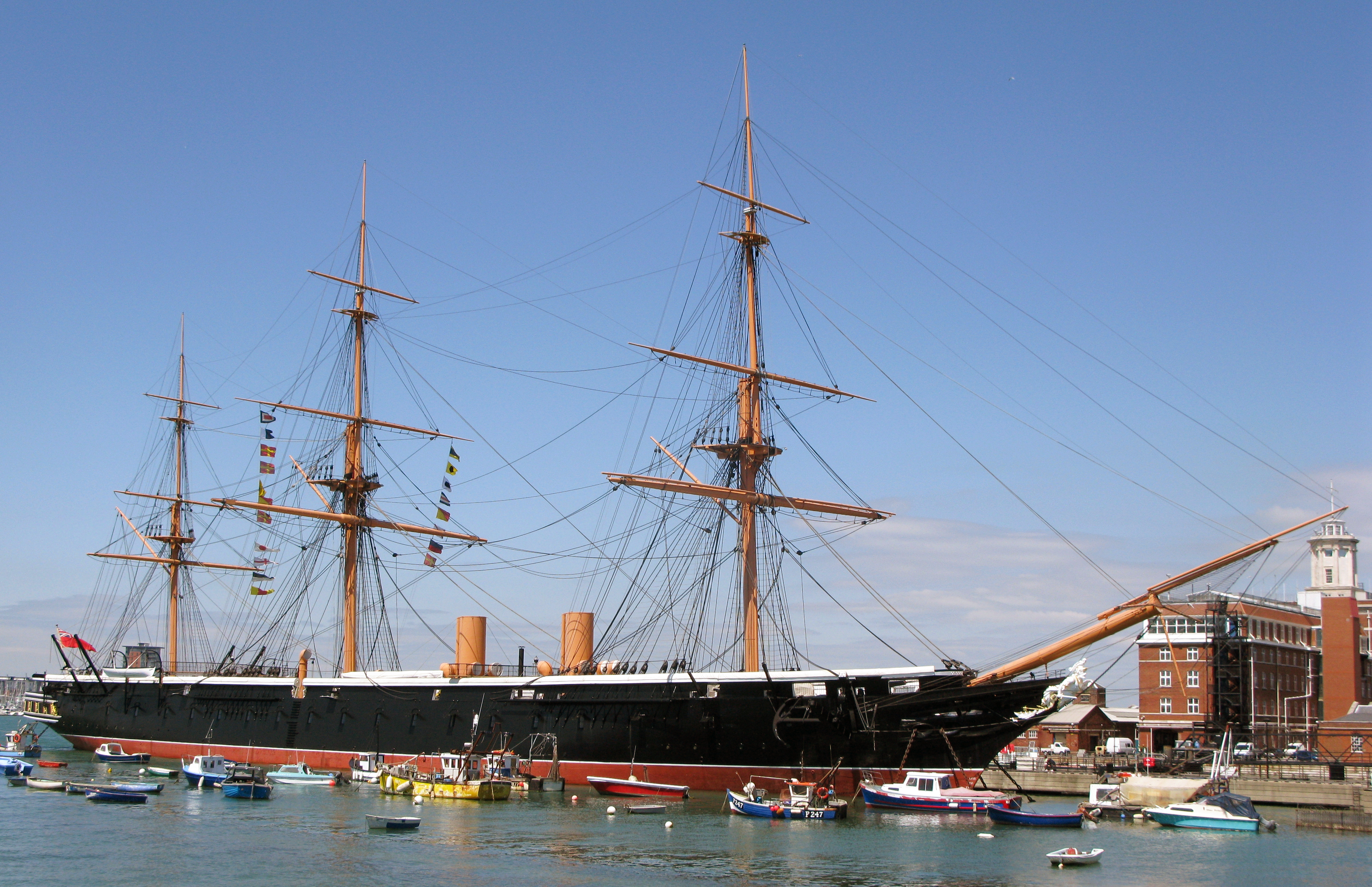
HMS Warrior, built by Thames Ironworks in 1859–1860

Thames Ironworks built many ships and other structures, the most famous being HMS Warrior, HMS Albion and their last ship, the dreadnought, HMS Thunderer, launched in 1912

By the early years of the 20th century, Thames Ironworks was struggling to compete with northern yards which had better access to steel and other supplies while a further disadvantage was that the yard's commitment to the eight-hour day was not matched by its northern rivals.

The yard shut in 1912 but several of her ships fought in the Royal Navy during World War I. HMS Thunderer and the old armoured cruiser HMS Black Prince took an active part in the Battle of Jutland which ensured the continued blockade of Germany, which did so much to determine the course of the war. Thunderer survived unscathed but Black Prince was sunk with the loss of all 857 of her crew.

=== 1892–1895 – Pre-history, Castle Swifts and Old St Luke's ===
Old Castle Swifts F.C. The colours were later re-used by Thames Ironworks for the 1897–98 season. They were inspired by Donald Currie's House Flag

The core of the initial Thames Ironworks, and thereby West Ham United, club originated in the remains of the bankrupt Old Castle Swifts in 1895. Old Castle Swifts had formed in 1892 as simply "Castle Swifts" at the behest of Castle Shipping Line employer Donald Currie and played their football opposite what is now the West Ham Police station. The club was the first professional football team in Essex, with players drawn from Castle Shipping Line's predominantly Scottish work force paid extra in addition to their works wages each time they made appearances for the team.

The team won the 1892–93 West Ham Charity Cup against Barking Woodville;

After the match the crowd made a rush to the Grand Stand where the Mayor presented the large silver cup to the captain of the Castle Swifts and Mr. Comerford of the Cup Committee announced that 'the medals had not yet come to hand, but they would be forwarded to the winners as soon as possible'. With that the captain was lifted on to the shoulders of several of his followers and carried from the ground.

The team amalgamated with Old St Lukes in 1894, renaming themselves Old Castle Swifts, acquiring several players in the merger and also the tenancy of Hermit Road.

In 1895, Currie was no longer interested in bankrolling the club, and allowed the team to lapse into bankruptcy. With both the club, and their tenancy at Hermit Road now up for grabs, the philanthropic Arnold Hills (a local business owner, keen amateur sportsman, and well known enthusiast for sports, healthy living, tee-totalling, works and community orientated functions) stepped in to take up the lease and absorb some of the players into his new club including former Woolwich Arsenal player Robert Stevenson the club's first captain and player of note.

Further connections between these clubs include the continuing presence of Old St Luke's honorary secretary Mr A. C. Davis (who later served as a West Ham United director), whilst several Thames Ironworks players had also turned out on an amateur basis for Old St Luke's on several occasions (including against Castle Swifts prior to their merger).

The Castle Swifts colours were re-used on several occasions by the Thames Ironworks team as an alternative to their traditional Oxford Blue kit.

=== 1895–1900 – Thames Ironworks F.C. and the legacy of Arnold Hills ===
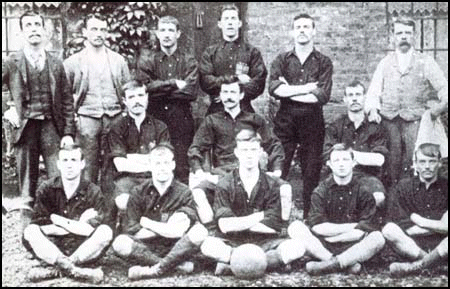
Earliest club shot, during its founding year as Thames Ironworks in 1895. Arnold Hills pictured top left, with Francis Payne to his immediate right

1895–1896: First kit based upon Oxford University "Full Blues".

The club was founded in 1895 as the works side Thames Ironworks F.C. by Thames Ironworks and Shipbuilding Co. Ltd company chairman Arnold Hills and works foreman Dave Taylor (who also worked as a local league referee). It was announced in the Thames Ironworks Gazette in June 1895 under the heading "The importance of co-operation between workers and management" in an effort to "wipe away the bitterness left by the recent strike":

"Mr. Taylor, who is working in the shipbuilding department, has undertaken to get up a football club for next winter and I learn that quoits and bowls will also be added to the attractions."

Arnold Hills had joined the board of the company in 1880 at the age of twenty-three, and eventually progressed to the position of managing director. During this time the company had grown producing ironclads and steam ships (such as HMS Albion) and already had a fine history of working government contracts (producing HMS Warrior in 1860 for instance). However, they also suffered through a period of unionised dock strikes (1889, 1890, 1891) that stretched from the boilermakers to engineers, joiners and labourers on issues of pay, working hours and safety. The use of scab labour further lowered the workforce's opinion of Hills and in 1892 he faced considerable pressure from management and workforce alike to find some recourse.

In direct response to this he began a series of initiatives that (little to his knowledge) would have further reaching consequences than improving workplace morale. Hills already sponsored cricket, running, rowing and cycling teams and went on to add a full works brass band, operatic society, ambulance corps and even a debating society in an attempt to improve works relations after these several years of tense stand-offs and strike action. He also initiated a 'Good Fellowship' scheme that featured bonus pay on top of wages. After a serious strike in 1897 he took it upon himself to negotiate directly with his workers, circumventing the Unions and cutting their power and influence off at the root, and implemented a profit-sharing system as well as reduced working hours. The works still experienced strike action despite his best efforts in the years after but never to the same extent.

Thank God this midsummer madness is passed and gone; inequities and anomalies have been done away with and now, under the Good Fellowship system and Profit Sharing Scheme, every worker knows that his individual and social rights are absolutely secured.

— Arnold Hills, 29 June 1895, Ironworks Gazette

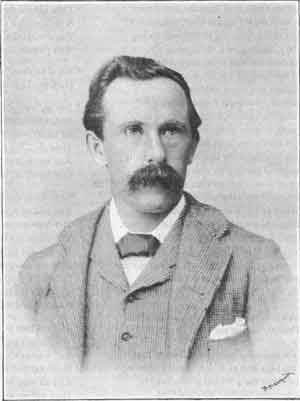
Arnold Hills in The Vegetarian weekly newspaper (1889)

Following the success of the 1895 FA Cup Final between West Bromwich Albion and Aston Villa, the growth of local sides and the success of competitions such as the London League and the West Ham Cup he took more readily to the suggestion of a true works football team as a method of further improving morale. There had been for some years a Thames Ironworks Juniors side (formed in 1892) that had amassed 75 victories from 81 matches, providing a solid grounding of young talent, along with several former Castle Swift players such as David Furnell, Johnny Stewart, George Sage, John Woods, George Gresham and Walter Parks (some of whom were employees of the ironworks) to create a starting eleven.

Hills made enough funds available for the formation of the team, contributed the club's first kit, an all navy blue strip, and saw a fine opportunity to take up the ground rent of the recently dissolved Old Castle Swifts at Hermit Road. Taylor duly spent the summer of 1895 recruiting players and arranging fixtures.

Hills was a former Oxford Blue in cricket, AAA one-mile champion, and an accomplished association football player. He played in the 1877 FA Cup Final for Oxford University and earned a Corinthians cap for England against Scotland in 1899. He was also a devout Christian, philanthropist and promoter of teetotalism and vegetarianism. Hills was the first President of the London Vegetarian Society (1888) serving alongside the young Mahatma Gandhi on the executive committee. He was involved in many other vegetarian ventures including being the first President of the Vegetarian Cycling and Athletic Club, a club which continues to this day.

As a member of the temperance movement, he regularly preached the evils of alcohol drinking. At least initially, some players were "tee-totallers" and the team was reported as such in several journals (and pushed by Mr Hills in society as such a thing). As a result, Hills is also responsible for the origin of the club and players first "nickname." Notably, some years later, Hills, after his influence had waned, was to offer to clear the club's debts if each player swore temperance.

Dave Taylor went back to refereeing prior to the start of the season after sorting out the initial round of friendlies, so for the first season the club's first coach was company employee A. T. (Ted) Harsent, with the Francis Payne (secretary of Thames Ironworks company) taking up the role of chairman and Chief Director. Tom Robinson took up the role of trainer and physio, a position he had held with Old Castle Swifts.

Mr. Hills' initial concept was for a purely amateur team for the benefit of works employees. Each who wished to take part paid an initial annual stipend of 2s/6d (12.5p) and attracted fifty would-be players for the first season alone. Such was the response that a dual schedule of games was arranged to cater for the number of players, with often entirely different line-ups taking to the field at the same time. Training took place on Tuesday and Thursday nights in a gas-lit schoolroom at Trinity Church School in Barking Road. Training mainly consisted of Army physical training exercises led by Tom Robinson. They also went for runs along the Turnpike Road now known as Beckton Road. The state of amateurism was to become a bone of contention between Arnold Hills and directors due to the growing professionalism of football as espoused by future manager Syd King in 1904:

"In the summer of 1895, when the clanging of "hammers" was heard on the banks of Father Thames and the great warships were rearing their heads above the Victoria Dock Road, a few enthusiasts, with the love of football within them, were talking about the grand old game and the formation of a club for the workers of the Thames Iron Works Limited. There were platers and riveters in the Limited who had chased the big ball in the north country. There were men among them who had learned to give the subtle pass and to urge the leather goalwards. No thought of professionalism, I may say, was ever contemplated by the founders. They meant to run their club on amateur lines and their first principal was to choose their team from men in the works."

The team played on a strictly amateur basis for 1895 at least, with a team featuring a number of works employees. Thomas Freeman was a ships fireman and Walter Parks, a clerk. Johnny Stewart, Walter Tranter and James Lindsay were all boilermakers. Other employees included William Chapman, George Sage and Fred Chamberlain, as well as apprentice riveter Charlie Dove, who was to have a great influence on the club's future at a later date.

As an old footballer myself, I would say, get into good condition at the beginning of the season, keep on the ball, play an unselfish game, pay heed to your captain, and whatever the fortunes of the first half of the game, never despair of winning, and never give up doing your very best to the last minute of the match. That is the way to play football, and better still, that is the way to make yourselves men.

— Arnold Hills letter to players, 16 March 1896

They won the West Ham Charity Cup in their first year and competed only in friendlies and one off exhibition games for their first season. Their first ever competitive game was against Chatham Town on 12 October in front of a crowd of 3,000 and saw Chatham run out 5–0 winners.

Hermit Road was home to some of the earliest examples of floodlighting. These experiments, which utilised docking equipment and a ball dipped in whitewash, were seen in a number of trials against London and Essex sides, including one against the aptly named Vampires, and culminated in high-profile games against Woolwich Arsenal and West Bromwich Albion.

They joined the London League in 1896, only gaining entrance due to the withdrawal of the Royal Ordnance Factories. They played their first game in the league against the Vampires on 19 September, a 3–0 win, and won 7 of their 12 games. They finished the season as runners-up.

In October 1896, the Irons played their final game at the Hermit Road ground and were shortly after forced by the local council to leave their home. They moved to Browning Road. However, the new situation was not ideal, as explained by future Ironworks player and West Ham United manager Syd King in his 1906 book:

"For some reason, not altogether explained, the local public at this place did not take kindly to them and the records show that Browning Road was a wilderness both in the manner of luck and support."

Arnold Hills, at great personal cost, proposed, secured the land, then funded the development of what became the Memorial Grounds. The venue would not merely be a playing ground for the football team (indeed Hills himself described it foremostly as "the largest cycle track in London") but would incorporate all Thames Ironworks societies as well as open access for the community at large.

In November 1897, Arnold Hills secured an agreement with London, Tilbury and Southend Railway (LT&SR) to build a station at Manor Road. The LT&SR board approved this in February 1898 and Mowlem was given the contract to build a four platform station, allowing for the proposed quadrupling of the line. The station was completed in May 1900 but did not open until 1 February 1901 as West Ham

Thames Ironworks turned professional upon entering the Southern League Second Division (the bottom level in those days) in 1898. The idea of the club as a "works" team had gradually become less plausible with the growing professionalism in the game, and gradually the team drifted away from its original conception (though works men could still sign up and take part in training and trials). In 1898, David Lloyd was signed. He would go on score close to a goal a game during his time with the club. In 1899, Francis Payne had been given a sum of £1,000 by Arnold Hills to find the players required to push the team on, as a result of which an approach was made to a player from Birmingham that ultimately resulted in Payne being suspended from football for "tapping up". Following Payne's resignation, the role of club secretary went to full-back George Neil, who signed a number of players, including Charlie Craig and Syd King (two fullbacks with a good reputation in the league), and Tottenham Hotspur forwards Bill Joyce, Kenny McKay and Harry Bradshaw.

The team won the Southern League title at the first attempt and were promoted to First Division proper. The following year, they came second from bottom, but had established themselves as a fully fledged competitive team. They comfortably fended off the challenge of local rivals Fulham in a relegation play-off, 5–1, in late April 1900 and retained their First Division status.

See also Thames Ironworks F.C. season 1895-96, 1896–97, 1897–98, 1898–99 and 1899–1900

== Syd King's management ==
=== 1900–1920 ===
West Ham adopted their now-familiar kit colours in 1903.

In June 1900, Thames Ironworks was wound up but was immediately relaunched on 5 July 1900 as West Ham United Football Club. Potential names of Canning Town, West Ham and Borough of West Ham were all considered, before West Ham United was decided upon. The club secretary was Lew Bowen. Despite the shift in team name, the club and its fans are to this day referred to as "The Irons" and "The Hammers" due to the original connection and still retains many rivalries (both friendly, and competitive) and community associations from these formative years. In particular, they are perceived to have retained many "working class" values, even with the rapid changes in the footballing climate.

The reborn club played their games at the Memorial Grounds in Plaistow (rented at favourable terms by Arnold Hills who was a major shareholder in the new club). In the 1901–02 season, Syd King replaced Bowen as secretary, combining the role with his playing duties. He became secretary-manager in May 1902. The team did well on the field and made a small profit. In the 1902–03 season, the directors were shocked by a loss of £151 that was caused by a wage bill that had gone up by 50 percent. The 1903–04 season saw an even greater loss, at £793, caused by the loss of season ticket income from supporters because the club had become more distant from the workers at the ironworks and with fewer local players being employed. At the beginning of the 1904–05 season, the directors were looking to move to the Boleyn Castle, a site of a Catholic school surrounded by small shops and residential streets, everything the Memorial Grounds did not have.

A growing estrangement between Hills and West Ham regarding rent and services at the Memorial Grounds and rejection of Hill's nominees as directors, culminated at the end of the 1903–04 season with Hills telling West Ham to vacate the Memorial Grounds, as it was needed for the amateur Thames Ironworks team, and to leave office space in buildings owned by the ironworks. The ultimatum forced the directors' hand, signing a lease for the Boleyn Ground. The rental provisions included the amalgamation of West Ham United with the incumbent Boleyn Castle football club, taking their best players into the West Ham reserves. The Boleyn Castle directors would be allowed to purchase stock in West Ham and one or more recommended to be elected to the board of West Ham United.

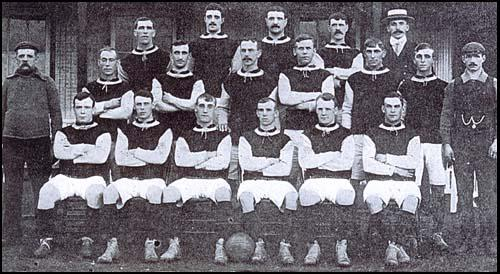
The 1904–05 West Ham team.

The first season at the Boleyn Ground, 1904–05, despite more expensive running cost, saw a profit of £400 in large part due to the gate receipt prices rising from £2,900 to £4,300. They then made an operating profit every year between 1905 and 1914.

The new ground was originally named "The Castle" for the 1904–05 season (a local pub in Plaistow to this day is called "The Castle") sited on a plot of land near Green Street House. The original gates to the ground, with the original Hammers crest (now painted in claret and blue), can be seen in Grange Road, London E13.

1904 also saw the introduction of the newly renamed club emblem. It incorporated the crossed hammers of the old Thames Ironworks emblem, and introduced the "castle" in the background meant to reference the fact the land they played on was home to an old Tudor castle for Anne Boleyn.

Funded through local collections, sponsorship and breweries, the club eventually constructed a 20,000 capacity stadium with 2,000 seats. The stadium was eventually named The Boleyn Ground (in honour of being constructed upon the grounds of a former residence of Anne Boleyn, Green Street House); it is, however, generally known as Upton Park in popular media. Their first game in their new home was against local rivals Millwall (themselves an Ironworks team, albeit for a rival company) drawing a crowd of 10,000 and with West Ham running out 3–0 winners. The Daily Mirror wrote on 2 September 1904:

"Favoured by the weather turning fine after heavy rains of the morning, West Ham United began their season most auspiciously yesterday evening; when they beat Millwall by 3 goals to 0 on their new enclosure at Upton Park."

The early history of both clubs are intertwined, with West Ham initially coming out on top in a number of meetings between the two teams as part of a budding and friendly local rivalry (even momentarily ground sharing when made homeless the following year) but eventually resulting in West Ham being promoted at the expense of Millwall. Millwall later turned down joining the fledgling Football League only to see West Ham go on to the top division and an FA Cup final. Later in the 1920s (rumoured to be 1926), the rivalry was supposedly spiced up during strike action made by East End companies (perceived to be West Ham fans) that Isle of Dogs-based companies (i.e., Millwall fans) refused to support breeding ill will between the two camps. The rivalry remains pronounced to this day.

West Ham United had joined the Western League for the 1901 season in addition to continuing playing in the Southern Division 1. In 1907, West Ham were crowned the Western League Division 1B Champions, and then defeated 1A champions Fulham 1–0 to become the Western Leagues Overall Champions.

=== 1920–1930 ===
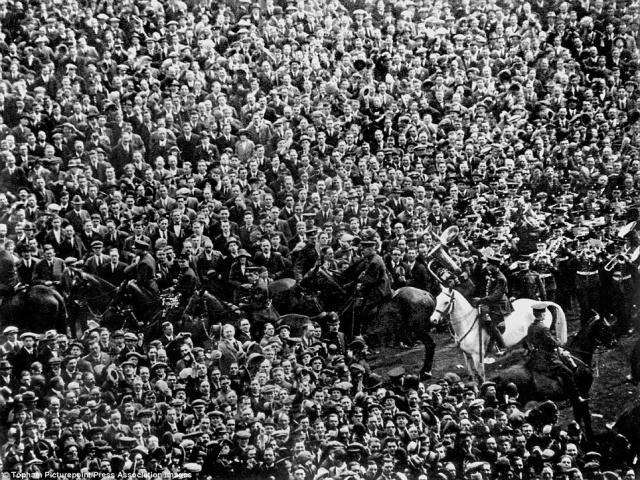
Billie the White Horse, saviour of the 1923 FA Cup. West Ham lost 2–0 on the day to Bolton Wanderers.

Still under the leadership of Syd King and growing influence of Charlie Paynter, West Ham won election to the Football League Second division proper in 1919 for the first post-war football season. They were first promoted to the top division in 1923 as runners-up to Notts County (on goal average ahead of Leicester City) and subsequently enjoyed nine top flight seasons, though regularly in the lower half and only twice broaching the top ten (in 1926–27 and 1929/30). Syd eventually built an attractive footballing side built around the skills of players such as Vic Watson, Jimmy Ruffell and Syd Puddefoot, and the goalkeeping of Ted Hufton.

Also in 1923, the club took part in the first ever FA Cup to be held at the newly constructed Empire Stadium more popularly known as "Wembley," against Bolton Wanderers. The event is notable, aside from the football, for its record attendance far in excess of the organisers' expectations or stadium capacity, and the presence of "Billie," a horse, ridden by PC G.A. Scorey (sometimes given as "Storey") that was required to clear the pitch in order for play to start. As a result, the final is commonly referred to as "The White Horse Final". The team lost 2–0 on the day in what became the marquee event for football.

See also White Horse Final

I'm forever blowing bubbles,

Pretty bubbles in the air.
They fly so high, nearly reach the sky,
And like my dreams they fade and die.
Fortune's always hiding,
I've looked everywhere...
I'm forever blowing bubbles,

pretty bubbles in the air.

— original lyrics to "Bubbles", from John Helliar

Sometime during the late twenties the club acquired one of its other longstanding monikers. At the time a Pears soap commercial featuring the curly haired child in the Millais "Bubbles" painting who resembled a player in a local schoolboy team for whom the headmaster coined singing the tune "I'm Forever Blowing Bubbles" with amended lyrics. Through this contrivance of association the club's fans took it upon themselves to begin singing the popular music hall tune before home games, sometimes reinforced by the presence of a house band requested to play the refrain by Charlie Paynter.

The team and fans have since on occasion been referred to as "Bubble Blowers"

See also West Ham United F.C. 1922-1923

== Charlie Paynter's management ==
=== 1932–1950 ===
The Syd King and Charlie Paynter partnership was dissolved acrimoniously in 1932 after the club's ninth-straight defeat, and with allegations of alcoholism and belligerence towards the directors from King. King died a few months later, taking his own life in an alcohol fuelled depression, at the age of 59.

Long-term servant Charlie Paynter, now nearly 50 and having spent more than 35 years at the club in a variety of roles, was installed as the club's manager and immediately oversaw the club's relegation to Division 2. West Ham were not to see the top flight again before World War II broke out.

He oversaw the redevelopment of the team, investing heavily in a youth policy and shunning for the most part signings from other teams in an effort to usher in an entirely new public image. His plans were in tatters soon enough as the war call-up stripped the club of practically all its starting squad and several in the administration. Paynter himself was exempt due to his age. With the government insisting life carried on as normal as possible, the team (often utilising visiting players as "guests," and a number of foreigners from the armed forces) continued to play regularly. In the League Cup, however, no such guests were allowed, and West Ham secured the first trophy with a 1–0 win over Blackburn Rovers in 1940 whilst watched by survivors of the Dunkirk evacuation. The club spent the majority of its next 20 years in Division 2 under the leadership of first Charlie Paynter.

== Ted Fenton's management ==
=== 1950–1962 ===
Ted Fenton had been brought back to the club in 1948 to assist Paynter in re-developing the team after the war. Previously, Fenton had played for West Ham from 1934 through to 1946 (he had been on the field when the club triumphed in the War Cup over Blackburn) making 201 appearances and scoring 44 goals and garnering five caps in the process as a wing half for England. In 1950, he assumed the reins fully as Paynter retired, severing the final link to the club's foundry origins.

Fenton was praised as a forward-thinking manager. He pushed for the establishment of "The Academy" that brought through a series of young players to augment a side that could not be improved with the limited finances available. Two of the signings he did manage to make were those of John Dick and Malcolm Allison. Other players of the day included John Bond, Dave Sexton, Jimmy Andrews and Frank O'Farrell (later swapped for Eddie Lewis) and Tommy Moroney all part of an original "Cafe Cassettari" club started by Fenton as a result of the restrictive budget. Longstanding custodian in goal was Ernie Gregory.

There [Cafe Cassateri], Allison would hold court and the players would exchange views on the game and make tactical plans around the dinner table, illustrating their ideas with the use of salt and pepper pots. The culmination of those years of hard work, on and off the field, was the Second Division championship in 1958 – the springboard to great cup successes at a much higher level in the mid-60s ... no one should underestimate the positive influence of Malcolm Allison's earlier role in Hammers' history.

— West Ham Club History, John Hellier

Cafe Cassettari sat opposite the Boleyn Ground, and Fenton organised a deal that saw meals and a warm welcome for the players of the club at a price the club could manage. It became a place for routine discussion of the team, and ideas and wisdom freely passed back and forth. The tradition lasted long into the 1960s, even after Fenton had moved on and saw the likes of John Lyall and Harry Redknapp pass through.

Dick was on his National Service when spotted by Fenton and brought into the team. Meanwhile, Allison played for local rivals Charlton Athletic but had made only two league appearances and was nearing 24 years old. Fenton acquired Allison by selling off one of the young players coming through the system. The pair went on to feature for the club for the remainder of Fenton's tenure with the team, though Allison had to retire through illness and instead became mentor to Bobby Moore alongside Irish international full back Noel Cantwell and all the other young players on the squad. Moore had been scouted initially in 1955 after Fenton had reportedly been tipped to his presence in the East Ham side, but it took two bites of the cherry for Jack Turner (then West Ham scout) to encourage his signing. In the end Fenton, put the lad on the books at £7 a month.

O'Farrell and Moroney were both acquired from Ireland in 1949 prior to Fenton becoming manager, but the pair were Irish internationals that had even featured in the 2–0 defeat of the England team at Goodison Park in 1949. John Bond had been brought in as Fenton's first signing in 1950 and was to be with the team for the next 15 years as a popular goalscoring right back playing opposite Captain Cantwell. Jimmy Andrews was brought in from Dundee in 1951 to play left wing, but eventually lost his position to Malcolm Musgrove.

Fenton introduced continental ideas to the team, revamping training methods and taking inspiration from higher ranked teams, and even inspiring some. Fenton had been impressed greatly by the all-conquering Hungarians of the 1950s led by Ferenc Puskás, and the Casseteri program and development of the academy were at the core. Ernie Gregory said (of the 1950s diet), "We'd usually eaten fish or chicken and toast before then, but Dr. Thomas advised us all to eat steak and rice two hours before kick-off. All the other clubs copied us after that." However, not all the changes were strictly down to Fenton; Musgrove attributed much of the training regime to Allison, going so far as to state that once the players were at the club (signed by Fenton) they were pretty much Allison's property. As well as being a student of the game himself, Fenton encouraged all players to take coaching badges and many of his former players went on to coaching and managing roles after they retired. The academy also involved, beyond the routine training and development of the youth and squad, actual tactical discussions between the players.

West Ham slowly improved through the 1950s, culminating in achieving promotion to the top division again in 1958 thanks primarily to the goals of John Dick. West Ham have since stated that much is owed to the structure put in place by Allison.

See also West Ham United F.C. season 1958-59 and 1959–1960

== Ron Greenwood's management ==
=== 1962–1974 ===
West Ham United first established themselves in 1964 when manager Ron Greenwood guided the club to their first major trophy in the shape of an FA Cup final victory over Preston North End. Ronnie Boyce scoring a last minute goal to secure a 3–2 victory, with striker Sissons becoming the youngest ever scorer in a cup final. The success of 1964 was repeated a year later, this time with a 2–0 European Cup Winners Cup triumph over 1860 München at Wembley.

Greenwood had been appointed to the position after four years as Arsenal's assistant manager and took charge for 1962. West Ham had been promoted to the top division in 1958 and subsequently managed to finish first sixth, then 14th and 16th before Greenwood led the team back into the top ten with an eighth-place finish in 1962. The team did not threaten the top ten for six years, but became perennial challengers in the cup, where they showed they were equal to any team over single games.

They followed up defeating Division 2 Preston by winning the European Cup Winners' Cup the subsequent season. The team defeated Real Zaragoza and Sparta Prague on their way to the final, where they took on 1860 München. Moore stated that the secret to their success was the presence of the newly established Martin Peters "In Europe you need more skill, and Martin added an extra quality to our game." Moore was gracious in victory as the team defeated 1860 München 2–0, with young untested Alan Sealey forced to play up front after injuries to first choice strikers Byrne and Brabook. He responded with a brace, whilst at the back Greenwood reflected, "This was Bobby Moore's greatest game. Technical perfection." Moore deflected the attention away, stating, "There was a lot of good football and we played really well against a good side."

The following season, the team made it to the final of the League Cup, but lost 6–3 on aggregate to West Bromwich Albion.

The most successful team of this period was ultimately founded upon the England international trio of club and international captain Bobby Moore in defence, Martin Peters in midfield and Geoff Hurst up front (all promoted through the youth system during Fenton's tenure). Moore had made his debut for West Ham in 1958, replacing an unwell Malcolm Allison, who had been a stalwart for the team at the back for a decade, taking the number 6 shirt at age 17 and was not to relinquish the position for another 16 years. He was captain at 20. He made his England debut in 1962, and subsequently became captain a year later going on to lead the team out 90 times in total until 1973.

Peters has been described as the first "modern midfielder." Alf Ramsey remarked that he was at least "ten years ahead of his time." In his 11 years with the club, though his debut only came in 1962, he managed to score nearly a goal every three games from midfield, and had played in every position for the club, including goalkeeper.

Hurst, meanwhile, was routinely dormant in the league, but was the leading cup goalscorer in England (both FA Cup and League Cup) until his records were broken some 30 years later by Robbie Fowler. Originally a midfielder, Greenwood converted him to be a front-running striker and it paid dividends—he led the team to consecutive cup appearances before capping it all off, becoming a regular England international and FIFA World Cup winner in 1966. In the following season, he scored 41 goals in the league, nearly a quarter of his eventual tally.

The club also sported the likes of long-time club servants John Bond and England international Ken Brown (father of Kenny Brown, who went on to play for the club in the 1990s), talented wing half Eddie Bovington, midfielder and forward Ronnie Boyce, leftback Jack Burkett (the first man to ever be substituted for the club) and rightback Joe Kirkup. Up front were the prolific striker Johnny Byrne and the slightly less prolific Brian Dear. Future manager Harry Redknapp played on the wing, while the goalkeeper was Jim Standen. Around this time, the club hired its first black player, John Charles.

Over the next few seasons, Greenwood added some of the club's best known—and longest-serving—youth products. These included 20-year servant and future manager Billy Bonds and long-time players Trevor Brooking (who also had spells managing the club), Frank Lampard Sr., (assistant manager during Redknapp's tenure), Clyde Best, John McDowell and Alan Sealey. In addition, the team acquired Bobby Ferguson as goalkeeper.

The moves ultimately helped to guide West Ham to another FA Cup success in 1975, this time against Fulham. Ron Greenwood subsequently was appointed England manager as replacement for Don Revie.

See also West Ham United F.C. season 1963-64, 1964-1964 and 1965–1966

== John Lyall's management ==
=== 1974–1989 ===
Greenwood was succeeded as manager by John Lyall, a former youth product who retired through injury, who guided West Ham to another UEFA Cup Winners' Cup final in his second season in charge, 1975–76. This time, however, West Ham were on the losing side, falling 4–2 to Anderlecht. Two years later, in 1978, the club was relegated to the Second Division, though Lyall was not replaced. In addition, many players were retained long enough to enjoy a second FA Cup victory under Lyall's leadership whilst still in Division 2 in 1980, a feat no side outside the top division has since achieved. This time the win was over another London club, the much-fancied Arsenal. In his time, Lyall had added Phil Parkes as goalkeeper, and had the fortune of having Alvin Martin, Geoff Pike and Paul Allen emerge through the ranks to add to the defence and midfield. In addition, he had captured skilful winger Alan Devonshire from non-league football, penalty-taking fullback Ray Stewart from Dundee United and Stuart Pearson from Cup winners Manchester United.

The game ended 1–0, with Brooking stooping to head home a goal he would have probably more easily scored with his feet, as the second division side more than held its own. Young Paul Allen became the youngest player to appear in a Wembley cup final, and at one point looked set to score what would have been a goal by the youngest player also, until a professional foul from Willie Young brought him down whilst clean through in behind the defence. This 1980 FA Cup is still West Ham's most recent major trophy.

In 1981, the Hammers finished runners-up in the League Cup. Between 1982 and 1985, West Ham achieved three consecutive top ten finishes. Lyall helped them achieve their highest league finish of third in 1986, but was sacked three years later as they suffered relegation to the Second Division. By the time of his departure, Lyall was the longest-serving manager at any club in the Football League, having been at West Ham for 15 years.

See also West Ham United F.C. season 1972-73, 1974–1975, 1975–1976, 1979–1980, 1980–81, 1985–86, 1986–1987, 1987–88 and 1988–1989

== The Macari and Bonds eras ==
=== 1989–1994 ===
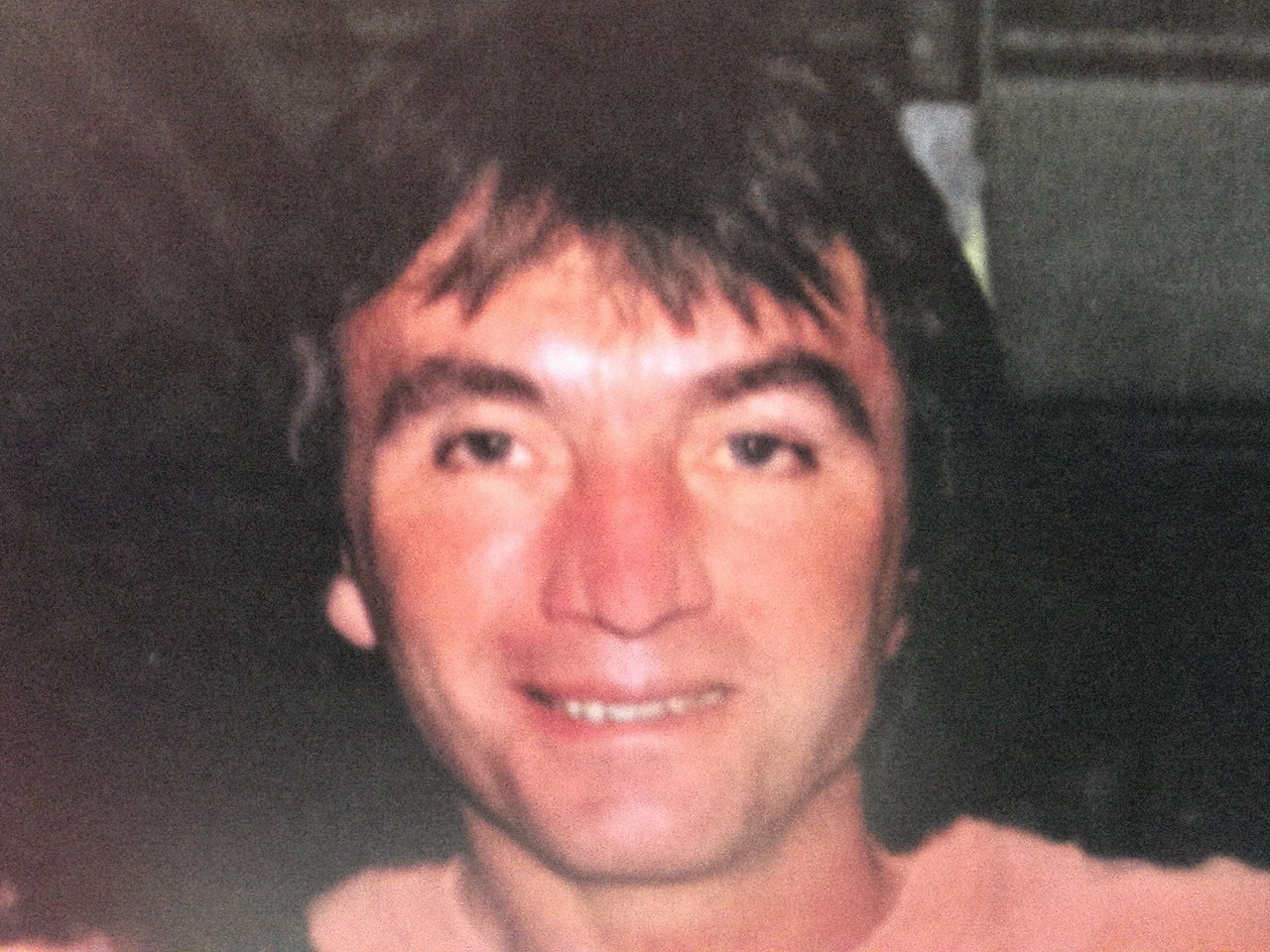
Billy Bonds

Lyall was replaced by Lou Macari for the 1989–90 season, but Macari resigned after less than one season as manager to concentrate on clearing his name in connection with financial irregularities at his previous club, Swindon Town. The next manager to occupy the hot seat at West Ham was Billy Bonds, who guided them to seventh place in 1989–90 (just missing out on the playoffs) but in 1990–91, they attained runners-up spot in the Second Division and returned to the First Division. But West Ham struggled throughout the 1991–92 season and were relegated in bottom place, missing the first season of the new Premier League.

The following season saw Clive Allen as Trevor Morley's strike partner following the departure of both Frank McAvennie and the previous season's top scorer, Mike Small. Also signed were midfield players Peter Butler and Mark Robson. Left-back Julian Dicks managed 12 goals, 11 of them in the league, but missed a total of 12 games through suspension after being sent off three times during the season and was stripped of the club captaincy. Morley's return to fitness was a success as he topped the club's goalscoring charts with 20 goals in the league and a further goal in the FA Cup. Allen was the second-highest scorer with 15 goals (14 of them in the league). West Ham regained their top flight status at the first attempt, finishing Division One runners-up in 1992–93 and securing promotion to the Premiership following a 2–0 home defeat of Cambridge United on 8 May 1993.

With the team in the Premier League, there was a need to rebuild the team. Oxford United player Joey Beauchamp was recruited for a fee of £1.2 million. Shortly after arriving at the club, he complained that he should not have made the move, as it was too far from his Oxford home. Bonds found this attitude hard to understand compared with his own committed, never-say-die style. This was the first evidence of his losing appetite for the modern game and modern player. Fifty-eight days later, Beauchamp was signed by Swindon Town for a club-record combined fee of £800,000, which included defender Adrian Whitbread going in the opposite direction. Whitbread was valued at £750,000.

Assistant manager Harry Redknapp was also now taking a bigger role in the transfer of players, with the club's approval. With rumours of his old club, AFC Bournemouth, being prepared to offer him a position, the West Ham board and their managing director, Peter Storrie, made a controversial move. Anxious not to lose Redknapp's services, the board offered Bonds a place away from the day-to-day affairs of the club, the West Ham board, which would have allowed them to appoint Redknapp as manager. Bonds, however, refused the post and subsequently resigned from the club. His accusations of deceit and manipulation by the board and by Redknapp have continued to cause ill-feeling. Peter Storrie claimed that they had handled the situation correctly, saying, "If Harry had gone to Bournemouth, there was a good chance Bill would have resigned anyway, so we were in a no-win situation. We're sad that Bill is going, and it's a big blow but it's time to move on and we have appointed a great manager."

== Harry Redknapp's management ==
=== 1994–2000 ===
One of Redknapp's first actions as West Ham manager was to re-sign striker Tony Cottee from Everton. He also signed Liverpool's Don Hutchison and brought back Julian Dicks, as well as re-signing striker Iain Dowie from Southampton. Redknapp also attempted to bring through the young talent of Matthew Rush, Steve Jones and Matty Holmes. Cottee started the second spell of his West Ham career well, forming a solid partnership with Trevor Morley that was aided by Ian Bishop, Dale Gordon and the aggressive Martin Allen in midfield. The team defied the popular belief that they would return to the First Division by finishing 13th. In addition, John Moncur was added from relegated Swindon Town.

West Ham avoided relegation again in the 1994–95 season and played their part in the final-day drama of the season, holding Manchester United to a 1–1 draw at Upton Park and denying them a third successive Premiership title. On paper, the team was routinely outclassed by opposition, but on grass it put in a series of superb performances. Old hand Alvin Martin partnered Steve Potts, Tim Breacker and Dicks with longterm custodian Luděk Mikloško in goal to form a stout defence that made up for the deficiencies elsewhere in midfield and up front, which had seen a number of players move on, including fan favourite Matty Holmes, to newly christened league champions Blackburn Rovers for £1.5 million.

Redknapp spent the summer adding to the team's defence. He had previously captured Danish International centre-back Marc Rieper in one coup and quickly followed this up by signing another international, this time the Croatian Slaven Bilić in January 1996 for a then-club record £1.65 million fee. West Ham progressed to tenth place in 1995–96.

Crucially at this point was the Jean-Marc Bosman case coming to an end, resulting in the "Bosman ruling." This meant no longer would Redknapp have to balance his team based upon nationality, a problem the previous year when Mikloško, Rieper and were all classed as "Foreign," thus leaving only one slot open for Irish/Welsh and English players. The change in ruling opened the door for a number of foreign internationals, and at the same time had seen a great number of established players within the team being shown the door; Hutchison, Burrows, Morley, Marsh, Holmes, Boere and Gordon were all released or sold on.

The following summer, going into the historic 1996–97 season, Redknapp continued looking abroad and made two of the most ambitious but perhaps least productive signings in the club's history – the Romanian national team's striker Florin Răducioiu and Portuguese winger Paulo Futre (formerly a £10 million man) from Milan. The deals failed to work out; Răducioiu left after six months at the club and returned to Romania after falling out with the manager (famously being christened a "tart, a fairy, a little girl" by Redknapp in his autobiography for complaining about the physical nature of the English game), while Futre played just one first-team game before being beaten by a long-term knee injury and announcing his retirement (and equally famously storming out after being denied the number 10 shirt for a friendly). Coupled with the equally-disastrous Marco Boogers affair; the drawn-out work permit wrangle involving Răducioiu's compatriot Ilie Dumitrescu, who had been signed six months earlier from Tottenham Hotspur but had failed to play the required number of games whilst at Spurs; and the lack of a quality second striker, West Ham struggled.

The 1996–97 Hammer campaign nosedived towards disaster after starting in an average fashion. Injuries to key and back-up players were critical (losing Stan Lazaridis to a broken leg, for instance, and what turned out to be the career-ending injury to the promising Richard Hall signed only months before for £1.5 million from Southampton), but so were the failed signings and some poor performances. The form of Michael Hughes (signed permanently after two years on loan from Strasbourgh) and performances of loan signing Hugo Porfírio were a rare bright spot, as was the emergence of future England teammates Rio Ferdinand and Frank Lampard. In a 2–2 draw with Manchester United, Răducioiu contributed a curling left footed shot around a full-stretch Peter Schmeichel. At Christmas, the team sat in midtable with only five wins and seven draws from 19 games, at which point they added one point from the next six games, sending the team to the bottom of the table.

Faced with relegation, the board financed two key acquisitions. Firstly, young Arsenal striker John Hartson in a £3.3 million move (again breaking the club's transfer record) and in addition the signing of Newcastle United forward Paul Kitson in a £1.2 million move and battling Manchester City midfielder Steve Lomas for £1.6 million. The strike pair were an instant hit, scoring 13 goals between them in 12 games as a pairing, including those in a vital 4–3 win against close rivals Tottenham, a 3–2 win against Chelsea and a hat-trick for Kitson and brace for Hartson in a 5–1 rout of Sheffield Wednesday in the next-to-last game, confirming the club's Premier League survival.

Despite the close shave, the hopes for the following 1997–98 season were high. Hartson and Kitson gave the team an exciting frontline, whilst in the midfield Redknapp added Eyal Berkovic from Southampton and Trevor Sinclair and Andy Impey from Queens Park Rangers. The team had to contend with the season-long loss of captain Julian Dicks, who had played on the previous year despite needing urgent knee surgery, the sale of Marc Rieper to Celtic and the sale of Slaven Bilić to Everton. The profit from the sale went to acquire former England under-21s David Unsworth and Ian Pearce from Everton and Blackburn respectively.

This season marked a change in Redknapp's tactical approach, who adopted a 5–3–2 formation for most of the season. This allowed Redknapp to blood the young talent of Rio Ferdinand in his preferred role as a sweeper whilst pairing him with two competent defenders. The pacey Stan Lazaridis and Andy Impey took over wingback roles, whilst the centre of midfield was contested by Lampard, Lomas and Berkovic, with Moncur preferred over Ian Bishop in reserve and Michael Hughes out in the cold. In goal, Mikloško started the year, but injury curtailed his season (and by the next summer had moved on to QPR), resulting in Craig Forrest stepping in. However, Redknapp also managed to secure Bernard Lama on loan from Paris Saint-Germain, which helped maintain West Ham's late-season push.

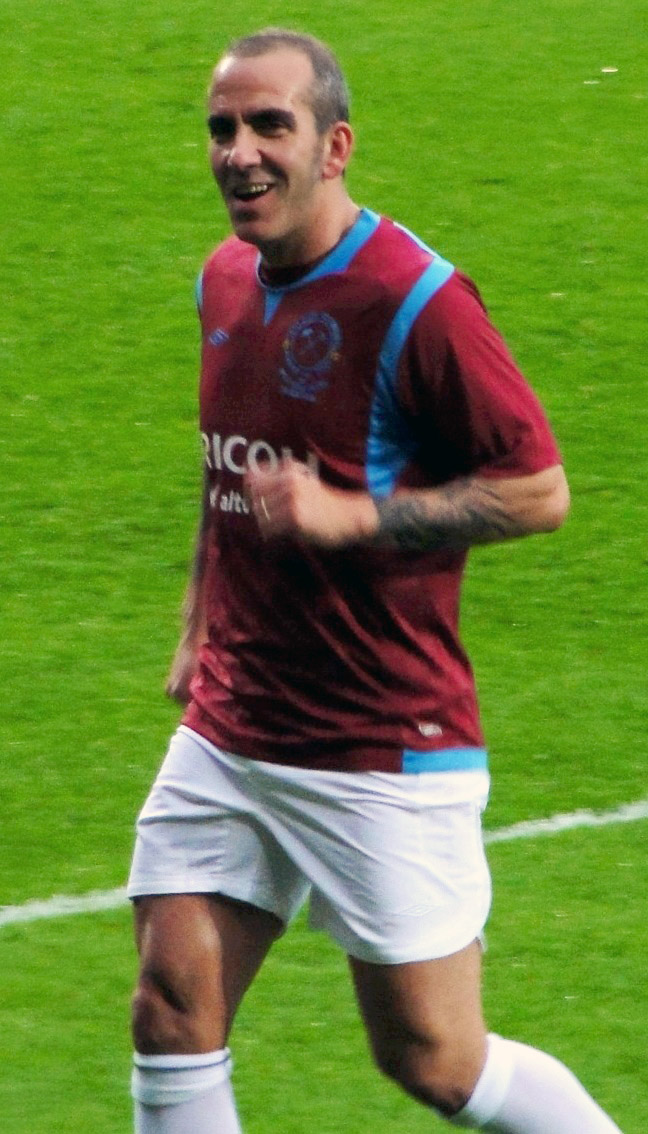
Paolo Di Canio at Upton Park

The season did not go entirely to plan. Kitson struggled (as he would for the remainder of his West Ham career) with niggling injuries that limited him to only 13 appearances and four goals. Redknapp acquired Samassi Abou for a bargain £250,000 to add depth and he performed admirably, if sometimes lacking in quality. Nonetheless, he became a crowd favourite for his languid style, skill and lampooned name, having to have it explained to him that the crowd were not "booing" him, but in fact "abouing" him. Hartson, however, scored consistently, notching 24 in his first season across all competitions, whilst Lampard flowered in midfield. The acquisition of Sinclair at Christmas revitalised West Ham as he shone in the wing back position. His seven goals in 14 games helped propel the team for the first time into the upper half of the table, with the side ultimately finishing the year in eighth.

For 1998–99, Redknapp again turned his transfer attention overseas and signed former French international Marc Keller, Cameroonian midfielder Marc-Vivien Foé and Chilean international Javier Margas. Redknapp, however, did not neglect home-grown talent, adding the experienced Ian Wright and Neil Ruddock, whilst also bringing Scott Minto back from abroad and Shaka Hislop in as goalkeeper on a free transfer from Newcastle. Hislop went on to win the Hammer of the Year award in his first season.

West Ham started the year slowly and by Christmas were facing a crisis. First, the club sold Andy Impey under the nose of the manager, literally removing him from a game in which he was tabled to start, and then made it clear to Redknapp that he would be given no further transfer funds due to the absenteeism of Javier Margas, which was taken to represent Redknapp's continued failure with recruiting foreign talent. John Hartson was found to be involved in a training ground incident involving Eyal Berkovic, and the owners were forced to act—Hartson was sold to Wimbledon FC for £7.5 million as a result after having an already disappointing start to the year where he did not score until ten games in, and was notably overweight and out of shape.

Redknapp was given some of the sale funds to purchase replacements. His first choice was Paolo Di Canio—who famously the previous year had pushed referee Paul Alcock to the ground—and he signed for an initial fee of £1.25 million. He also signed former Manchester United target Marc-Vivien Foé for £3.5 million to solidify the midfield.

By the end of 1998–99, West Ham had achieved a fifth-place finish, but, for the first time in league history, were denied a UEFA Cup place due to new UEFA coefficients rule. (The seasons to either side had seen every team down to seventh feature in the UEFA Cup.) The team instead was entered as one of England's UEFA Intertoto Cup competing teams, which nevertheless granted an eventual spot for UEFA Cup qualification. A victory over Metz in the two-legged final eventually earned the Hammers a place in the UEFA Cup, ending an absence of almost 20 years from European competition. Redknapp brought in Paulo Wanchope from Derby County to complement Paolo Di Canio and Igor Štimac to replace the outgoing Unsworth.

In 1999–2000, consolidation was supposed to be the key, but once again plans were interrupted by injury. The Intertoto and UEFA Cup expedition took a lot out of the players – but the team started the season sharper than the others, resulting in a comfortable upper-midtable position by the halfway point of the season. Tiredness, loss of form and a build-up of injuries resulted in a slide downwards towards the end of the season, eventually resulting in a ninth-place finish and a third consecutive year in the top half.

The year was noticeable for the introduction of Joe Cole and Michael Carrick to the first team proper, the ignominious exit in the League Cup to Aston Villa due to an enforced replay after it transpired that last minute substitute Emmanuel Omoyinmi had featured in the competition whilst on loan earlier in the season (this event saw the resignation of Martin Aldridge), and the barracking Paulo Wanchope received for the early part of the year. The striker failed to settle despite scoring 12 league goals in 33 games. His erratic form and the unpredictable nature of his game meant he would move on at the end of the year.

Marc-Vivien Foé was sold at the end of the year (his final act was a plunging tackle from behind that saw him sent off against Arsenal) and Redknapp acquired Frédéric Kanouté with the money.

=== 2000–01 – End of Redknapp ===
The 2000–01 season was Redknapp's final year. They got off to a dismal start, hampered by further injuries (Sinclair notably, but also Ian Pearce continued absence), a number of failed loan transfers (Christian Bassila and Kaba Diawara) and unimpressive signings (Davor Šuker, reportedly on £50,000-a -week wages who only managed eight starts, Ragnvald Soma and the continued absence of Margas, who had turned up for half of the previous season). With the team in the doldrums, the board eventually accepted a bid for the team's prized asset – Rio Ferdinand – in an £18 million move to Leeds United for both the British transfer record and a world record for a defender. The deal was later criticised – the fee was not paid upfront and sell-on bonus was not included, meaning the club missed out on his later £30 million move to Manchester United and also a sizeable chunk of the initial transfer.

Redknapp proceeded to spend a chunk of the transfer money on a string of coolly received signings (in addition he was given a £300,000 bonus for agreeing not to spend the entire transfer sum and arranging the transfer to Leeds), forcing what was to be the end of his time at the club. Redknapp signed the Liverpool pairing of Rigobert Song (a solid, if erratic and unsuited to the physical Premiership, player with over 60 caps to his name for £2.6 million) and Titi Camara (an exciting attacking player who arrived massively overweight, unfit and devoid of form after being forced out of the Liverpool first team for £2.2 million), along with Scottish international Christian Dailly (who had never lived up to his great early promise for £1.75 million), for a total of some £8 million (including fees and final cost adjustments). These transfers were later used as ammunition against the departing Redknapp, with aspersions cast regarding agent fees and the expensive nature of Camara's alleged Pay-As-You-Play contract that would have seen further monies paid after a relatively small number of games. His only solid moves from a fan's point of view, the loan signings of Hannu Tihinen from Viking FK and Svetoslav Todorov, did little to improve the paucity in quality of the first team. The team's fortunes improved imperceptibly, but survival was ensured thanks to the poor performances of lower sides and the team finished in 15th place, comfortably out of the relegation zone.

At this point Redknapp's relationship with the board, already strained since the Andy Impey incident, fell apart. Redknapp requested a warchest of £12 million to get the club back into the top six, with a sizeable portion of this to go towards bringing in Paris Saint-Germain left-winger Laurent Robert and a client of football agent and close associate of Redknapp, Willie McKay.

Slanderous comments soon followed in the direction of the West Ham board as Redknapp gave an interview in the unofficial West Ham fanzine, Over Land and Sea, focusing his tirade on the lack of funding. The outburst caused so much friction that his position as manager became untenable, and Redknapp was sacked before the end of the season.

In the aftermath, Frank Lampard Sr. left the club, and due to the obvious fallout, his son Frank Lampard was sold off to Chelsea for £11 million. The money was subsequently granted to incoming manager Glenn Roeder.

== West Ham united under Glenn Roeder ==
=== 2001–2003 ===
Several big names were linked with the vacant manager's job. Former West Ham player Alan Curbishley, who had rebuilt Charlton Athletic on and off the field since becoming their manager in 1991, instantly became favourite for the job, but insisted he was not interested. Steve McClaren, who had been assistant manager of Manchester United in three successive title-winning seasons (including the 1999 treble campaign), was also linked with the job, but he was ultimately appointed manager of Middlesbrough. Thus, West Ham turned to youth team manager Glenn Roeder to fill the role. People doubted Roeder's suitability for the job, as his only managerial exploits had been short-lived and perceived to be unsuccessful with Gillingham over 1992–93 and Watford from 1993 to 1996.

West Ham had a slow start to the 2001–02 season, hampered by injuries to key players. New signing David James was injured before he even made an appearance whilst on International duty; Frédéric Kanouté, Michael Carrick and Paolo Di Canio nursed groin and knee problems. The board made money available for strengthening the squad, and Roeder acquired respected Czech international defender Tomáš Řepka from Fiorentina and Don Hutchison for his second term with the Hammers. However, Roeder was soon under immense pressure from fans, who were calling for him to be sacked, especially after witnessing back-to-back maulings at the hands of Everton (5–0) and Blackburn (7–1). He responded by guiding the club to a seventh-place finish in the final table, just one place short of European qualification – although there was a 12-point gap between West Ham and sixth-placed Chelsea.

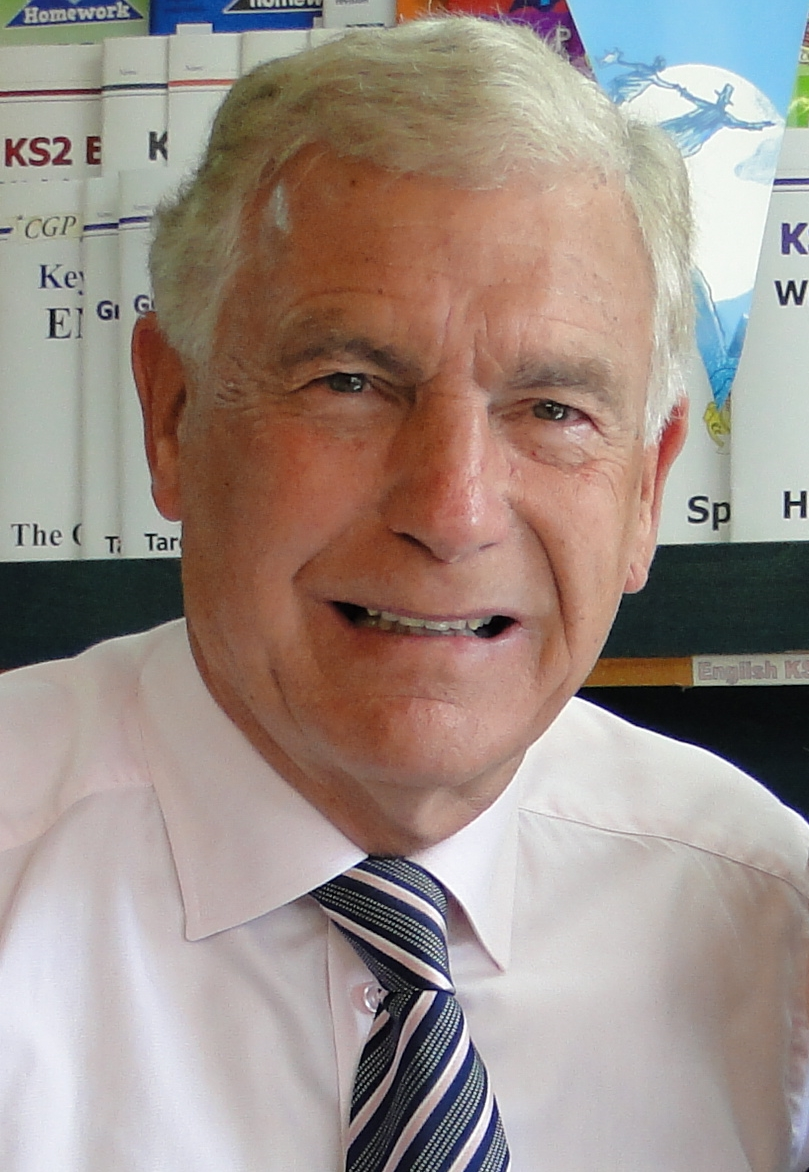
Sir Trevor Brooking

The summer of 2002 did not bode well for the season ahead. Despite a glaring need for squad reinforcements, the only positive transfer activity involved Irish international Gary Breen signing on a free transfer. Leaving were Paul Kitson and a hatful of youth and fringe players. Another poor start plagued West Ham United through to 2003, and this time Roeder was unable to turn things around. The loss of Kanouté for nearly one-third of the season, and Di Canio at exactly the same period, resulted in the teenage Jermain Defoe leading the line on his own. The loss of form of key players such as Trevor Sinclair, 2001–02 Hammer of the Year Sebastian Schemmel and Michael Carrick, who was still nursing a groin problem, combined with the absence of a dependable left back or left midfielder, merely exacerbated an already difficult situation. The Hammers failed to win a single home game until January and suffered a humiliating defeat at the hands of Manchester United in the FA Cup. The much-attacked Gary Breen was pointedly at fault for a number of errors, but his play was not helped by the lack of any cohesive team.

During the transfer window, the club acquired Les Ferdinand and Rufus Brevett, and more importantly got Di Canio and Kanouté both back on the pitch and off the treatment table. The club's form improved and they began to claw their way up the table towards safety. In April, Roeder collapsed in his office and was diagnosed with a brain tumour. He was immediately given a leave of absence and 1980 FA Cup final hero Trevor Brooking took over for the final three games of the Premiership season. However, despite an upturn in the team's form (winning two and drawing one), they were unable to overhaul Bolton and finished 18th in the final table, two points short of the relegation safety zone. West Ham drew early in the season and then lost against Bolton during the run in; a draw against Bolton in their second match would have been sufficient to see West Ham survive. Their ten-year spell in the Premiership was over.

Not since 1994–95 had a club been relegated from the division with more than 40 points (West Ham had 42), but this was no consolation for a disappointed West Ham side filled with some of the most promising young English players, all tipped for international honours. The relegation forced the sale of key players Joe Cole and Glen Johnson both to Chelsea; Kanouté and later Jermain Defoe to Tottenham; and Trevor Sinclair and David James to Manchester City in a bid to prevent a financial crisis at Upton Park. Roeder was sacked soon after the start of the 2003–04 season.

== Alan Pardew's management ==
=== 2003–2006 ===
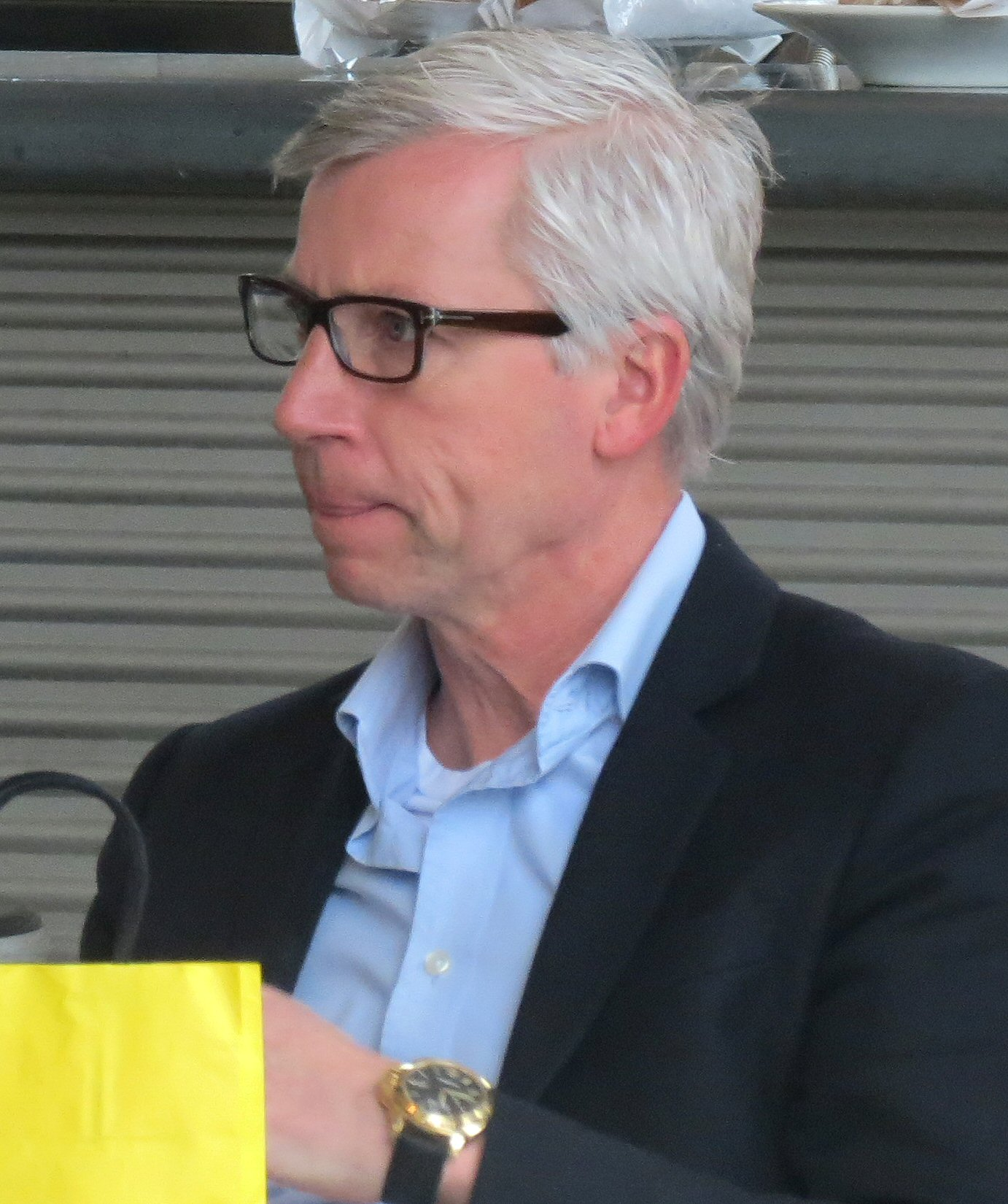
Alan Pardew

Alan Pardew was the eventual replacement for Roeder, following Brooking's second brief stint as caretaker manager. Pardew was head hunted from fellow Division One rivals (and promotion hopefuls) Reading by West Ham with the objective of promotion back to the Premier League. With a team whose talent had become marginalised over the previous six months since relegation, the task did not appear to be a simple one.

The team saw over 15 new players brought in on both short- and long-term deals, including Rob Lee, David Connolly, Marlon Harewood, Matthew Etherington, Kevin Horlock, Hayden Mullins, Nigel Reo-Coker, Andy Melville, Bobby Zamora and Brian Deane. The turnover of players continued, however, with these and other acquisitions funded by the loss of David James, Jermain Defoe and Ian Pearce. The squad was bolstered with a contingent of loan signings such as Wayne Quinn, Neil Mellor, Matthew Kilgallon, Niclas Alexandersson, Robbie Stockdale and Jon Harley. As a result, the team routinely lacked cohesion and without Defoe for a large part lacked a quality striker in front of goal – though Connolly's immediate impact (five in the nine opening league games) and positive attitude coupled with Harewood's form went some way to make up for the loss of the future England international.

The team's form had picked up noticeably under Trevor Brooking, rising from tenth in the table to second by mid-September. With Pardew installed as manager on 18 September, the fans did not have to wait long for their first win, with the team taking a 3–0 victory over Crystal Palace on 1 October. A subsequent victory against Derby County, however, was the last for almost a month until title run-away leaders Wigan Athletic were beaten 4–0 at Upton Park. By this point, the team had slipped to eighth and were more than six points off the pace of the top six sides. Mixed form throughout January to March saw the team below the top six, but a late run gave them fourth place in the table. In the playoff final, they were defeated 1–0 by Crystal Palace, who finished sixth that year.

The following year, promotion was achieved through the playoffs. The team had only just sealed the last playoff place with a 2–1 win over Watford on the last day of the season. This time, having played twice against Ipswich Town, West Ham drew 2–2 at Upton Park and won 2–0 at Portman Road over the two legs to qualify for the final at the Millennium Stadium. Here, they achieved their aim with a 1–0 win against Preston North End, with Bobby Zamora scoring the only goal of the game in the second half.

Following promotion, the club exceeded expectations and achieved the ultimate target of survival for 2005–06 with a top-half place in the 2004–05 Premiership. Pardew claimed that he will not sell the club's best players, and appeared to have the backing of the board on this issue; he in fact spent a club record £7 million to bring Dean Ashton to Upton Park, who had been touted as "the next Alan Shearer." In January and February 2006, following a 3–1 home defeat by Chelsea, West Ham embarked on their best sequence of results for 20 years, winning seven consecutive games in all competitions (five in the league and two in the FA Cup). The 3–2 win away to Arsenal on 1 February, on West Ham's last visit to Highbury Stadium, was the most noteworthy victory during this run, with the Hammers recording their first win over Arsenal at their stadium since 1995.

This seven-game winning streak ended when they drew 0–0 with Bolton in the FA Cup fifth round, however their unbeaten run continued when they drew 2–2 against Everton in the Premier League before coming to an abrupt halt with a heavy defeat against Bolton, losing 4–1. However, Pardew fielded a weakened team in that game in preparation for the FA Cup replay against Bolton again, where they won 2–1 after extra time with a Marlon Harewood goal. On 18 March, they then played their former manager and player Harry Redknapp's club Portsmouth on his first return to Upton Park. Portsmouth won 4–2 as Pardew rested some key players. Two days later, however, the Hammers beat Manchester City 2–1 to reach the FA Cup semi-finals. On 23 April, less than a week following a loss to Middlesbrough in a league fixture, West Ham defeated them 1–0 at Villa Park in the FA Cup semi-finals, with Harewood again scoring the goal that sent the Hammers through to their first FA Cup final since they beat Arsenal in 1980. This also secured the Hammers a place in the 2006–07 UEFA Cup, as Liverpool, their final opponent, were assured of no less than a spot in the final qualifying round of that season's UEFA Champions League.

The Hammers, with a place in next year's UEFA Cup and a FA Cup final, now turned their attention towards securing a top-ten finish, a position they had held since the start of the campaign. With this objective in mind, as well as the FA Cup final on 13 May, Pardew had a dilemma—whether to stick out his first team and run the risk of injuries and suspensions, or hold back. A "mock" run-up of the FA Cup final saw Liverpool beat the Hammers 2–1 in the league, with a late confrontation involving Hayden Mullins and Luis García seeing both players dismissed via red card, missing the final. In the wake of the match, the Hammers defeated an already-relegated West Brom side 1–0, with a single goal from Nigel Reo-Coker. Dean Ashton limped off with a hamstring injury, making him a doubt for the final.

West Ham won their final game of the season 2–1 over archrivals Tottenham, cementing ninth place in the Premier League. Tottenham's loss to West Ham on the final day would result in Tottenham being overtaken in the league by Arsenal and therefore missing out on a Champions League place. The match was marred by controversy, as many of the Spurs players were ill on the evening before the match; this was initially believed to be food poisoning, but was later found to be a virus that had spread. As a result, the FA offered Spurs a delayed kickoff to, which the club refused. Tottenham ended up losing the match by a final score of 2–1. West Ham scored first when midfielder Carl Fletcher struck past Spurs keeper Paul Robinson. Tottenham then equalised through former Hammer striker Jermain Defoe. The Hammers had a chance to win the game when former Spurs player Teddy Sheringham took a penalty kick, but the kick was saved. Israel international Yossi Benayoun was the hero and scored the game-winning goal with a stunning strike.

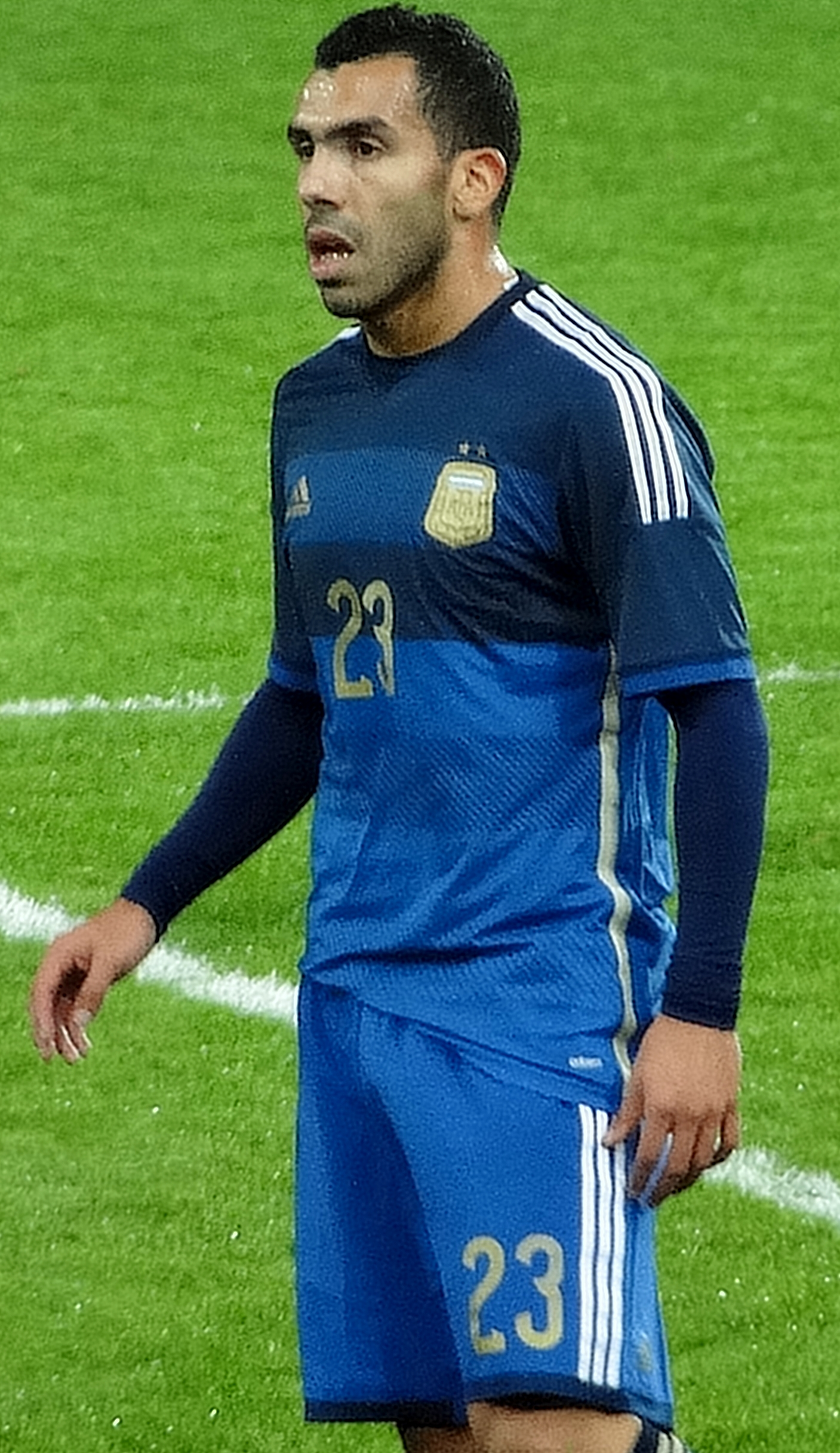
Surprise signing, Carlos Tevez

Notably during the season, two of West Ham's longest serving managers died, Ron Greenwood and John Lyall. Greenwood and Lyall both led West Ham to FA Cup victories in 1964, 1975 and 1980.

If Pardew had guided West Ham to FA Cup glory, he would have been the first English manager to win the trophy since Joe Royle won it with Everton back in 1995. It would also have ended West Ham's 26-year wait for a major trophy, which began after their FA Cup triumph in 1980. The game ended 3–3, however, despite West Ham taking a two-goal lead early in the match. West Ham eventually lost 3–1 on penalties in what was considered by many as the best FA Cup final in recent years.

During the summer break before the start of the 2006–07 season, Pardew suffered a huge blow to his team with the loss of Dean Ashton. During training whilst on international duty, Ashton broke his ankle. He was training for England's football match the following day against Greece, which was about to be England's first match under manager Steve McClaren.

On the transfer deadline day for the new season, 31 August, West Ham seemed to have surprised world football when speculation mounted that two of the most promising young footballers in the world would be joining on permanent move. Carlos Tevez announced on his website that he and Javier Mascherano would be joining West Ham from Brazilian club Corinthians. West Ham confirmed shortly afterwards that not only had they signed the two Argentinians, but that they had signed on permanent deals. West Ham reportedly had to beat off competition from some major European clubs to sign the two young players.

West Ham's return to European competition, in the 2006–07 UEFA Cup, was ultimately short-lived as they lost 4–0 over two legs in the first round proper to Italian club Palermo. This marked a major downturn in form leading to eight losses in succession in all competitions as of 24 October, including a shock 2–1 loss away to League 1 side Chesterfield in the third round of the Carling Cup. The Hammers finally stopped the record-breaking run on 29 October at home to Blackburn with a 2–1 win in the Premiership, with goals from Teddy Sheringham, who in the making became the oldest ever goal scorer in the Premier League, and Hayden Mullins getting the winner in the 79th minute. They made it two consecutive wins when they beat Arsenal at Upton Park with Marlon Harewood getting an 89th-minute winner. The game was overshadowed by the arguments between Arsène Wenger and Alan Pardew in the manager dugouts, both having been later charged by the FA. On 21 November, the proposed takeover of West Ham by a consortium headed by Icelandic businessman Eggert Magnússon went through, fuelling speculation over Pardew's future. After just four games with Magnusson as the new chairman of West Ham, Pardew was sacked from the manager's role on 11 December, after a 4–0 drubbing at Bolton on the Saturday before. Pardew eventually found work again on 24 December 2006, at Charlton Athletic, ironically where Pardew's replacement Alan Curbishley had spent 15 years of his managerial career, building his reputation.

=== Magnússon takeover ===
On 1 September 2006, the Board of West Ham confirmed, following press speculation, that they were in takeover talks with an unnamed party. They announced that there was no link between this prospective takeover bid and the signings of Carlos Tevez and Javier Mascherano the day before. Media Sports Investment (MSI), the company which owns the contracts of those two players and which chose to bring them to West Ham, confirmed that it had no interest in investing in European football clubs, thereby ruling itself out of being behind these talks. However, a consortium headed by former MSI frontman Kia Joorabchian entered into talks with the club on 5 September. These talks broke down in early November after further debts that had not been declared by West Ham were revealed in the due diligence process. This was compounded by the announcement that West Ham would be unable to move into London's Olympic Stadium after the event, which was to be reserved for athletics use.

On 21 November 2006, West Ham announced that they had reached an agreement with a consortium headed by Icelandic businessman Eggert Magnússon for the sale of the club worth £85 million.

On 26 November 2006, The Guardian reported that West Ham may move to the Olympic Stadium in 2012, with the running track left intact.

On 11 December 2006, it was confirmed that Alan Pardew was sacked as manager after a dismal run of results, including a 4–0 loss to Bolton. In the first few days that followed the departure of Pardew, it was confirmed that West Ham were in talks with Alan Curbishley, who played for the Hammers between 1975 and 1979.

== Alan Curbishley's management ==
=== 2006–2008 ===
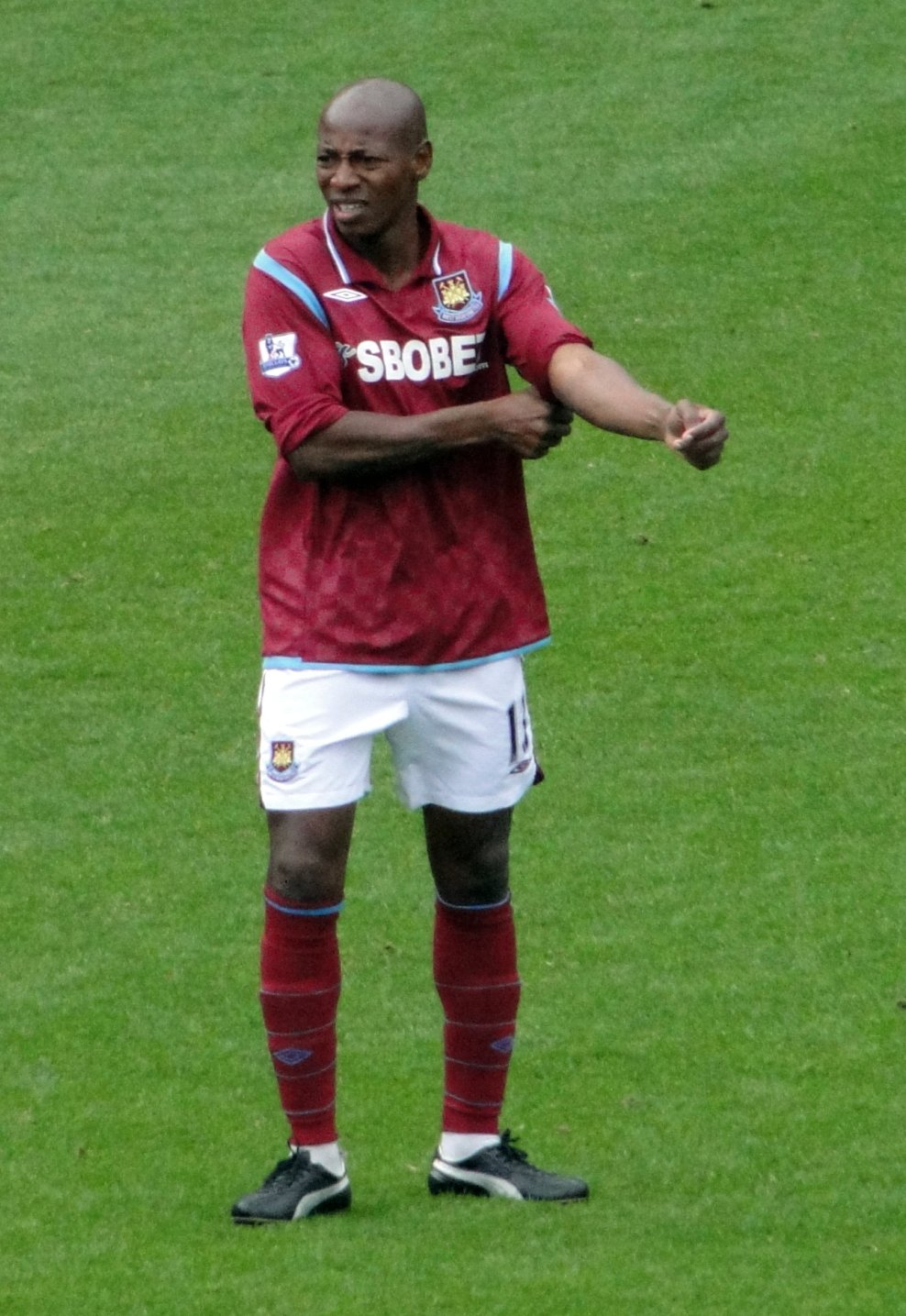
Curbishley's first signing, Luis Boa Morte

Former West Ham player and Charlton Athletic manager Alan Curbishley officially took over the vacant West Ham job on 13 December 2006, just 48 hours after Pardew had been sacked by new chairman Eggert Magnússon. Curbishley had been the odds-on favourite for the West Ham job straight after Pardew's departure, so it came as no surprise that Curbishley was unveiled at a press conference on 13 December. Curbishley served as manager of local rivals Charlton for 15 years leading up to May 2006. During that time, he took Charlton from a struggling side languishing in old Second Division to a recognized Premiership side.

Curbishley had been linked with the West Ham job five years earlier, in the summer of 2001 after Harry Redknapp left the club, but decided the time was not right for him and the job went to Glenn Roeder instead. Curbishley made an impressive start with a victory over the current Premiership leaders Manchester United, his first ever victory over them in his managerial career, in which he won the game 1–0 with a late 75th-minute winner from captain Nigel Reo-Coker.

In January 2007, with West Ham struggling in the bottom three, Curbishley made his first moves in the transfer market as manager. His first signing was pacy Portuguese winger Luís Boa Morte from Fulham, soon followed by West Brom's Nigel Quashie. These signings were backed by defensive reinforcements in the form of young Calum Davenport from Tottenham (who had previously been loaned to West Ham during their Championship years) and Australian captain Lucas Neill from Blackburn. Neill shunned the chance to sign for Liverpool after reportedly being offered double their proposed wage (£60,000 per week, compared to £30,000 per week at West Ham, which would have made him the Hammers' highest-ever earner). With Carlos Tevez out through injury, along with first choice Dean Ashton still yet to appear this season, Spanish under-21 striker Kepa was signed on loan from La Liga's Sevilla.

However, the final weeks of the season saw much improvement in performances and a marked strengthening of confidence and self belief in the team. Couple this with crumbling morale at Sheffield United and Fulham and it appeared as if "the Great Escape" was now in the bag. West Ham won seven of their final nine games, defeating Blackburn, Arsenal, Everton, Middlesbrough, Bolton, Wigan and Manchester United. On 5 May 2007, West Ham moved out of the relegation zone with a 3–1 win over Bolton and Wigan losing 1–0 to Middlesbrough. West Ham now sat in 17th place in the Premiership, three points ahead of Wigan.

On 13 May, in their last match of the season, West Ham played Manchester United at Old Trafford needing at least a draw to survive in the Premiership. Tevez sent West Ham 1–0 ahead at the end of the first half injury time (45+1'). West Ham were victorious, securing 15th place; Sheffield United were relegated to the Championship.

Curbishley continued to overhaul his squad in the summer of 2007. Yossi Benayoun (Liverpool), Paul Konchesky (Fulham), Nigel Reo-Coker, Marlon Harewood (both to Aston Villa) and, most notably, Carlos Tevez (Manchester United) all headed for the Upton Park exit door. Meanwhile, midfielders Scott Parker (£7 million), Kieron Dyer (£6 million) and Nolberto Solano (free) all arrived from Newcastle United; wingers Julien Faubert (£6 million) and Freddie Ljungberg (£2 million) were signed from French club Bordeaux and London rivals Arsenal respectively; and Craig Bellamy (£7.5 million) and Richard Wright (free) both made the switch from Merseyside to East London, signing from Liverpool and Everton respectively. Striker Henri Camara completed Curbishley's squad, signing on a season-long loan from Wigan.

The 2007–08 season proved to be one of consolidation for the Hammers. They moved into tenth position in the table during the Christmas period and remained there until the end of the season. A season of disappointing performances—including a run of three consecutive 4–0 losses—and long injury lists has been punctuated by a solid showing in the League Cup (losing in the quarter-finals to Everton) and some excellent results, including a five-goal win away at Derby and home wins against title-chasing Manchester United and Liverpool.

The season was somewhat overshadowed by the successful efforts of Sheffield United to win financial compensation for the actions of West Ham during the Carlos Tevez affair. As of September 2008, the "Sheffield United Fight for Justice" has been through three different courts and has received a positive verdict from an arbitration panel, announced at the end of September (postponed from June).

In the 2008–09 season, Curbishley resigned and was replaced by the Italian Gianfranco Zola. Curbishley subsequently took the club to court, claiming he was forced to resign due to players being sold without his consent (in regards to George McCartney and Anton Ferdinand). This claim was eventually won and the club was forced to compensate Curbishley.

== Gianfranco Zola's management ==
=== 2008–2010 ===
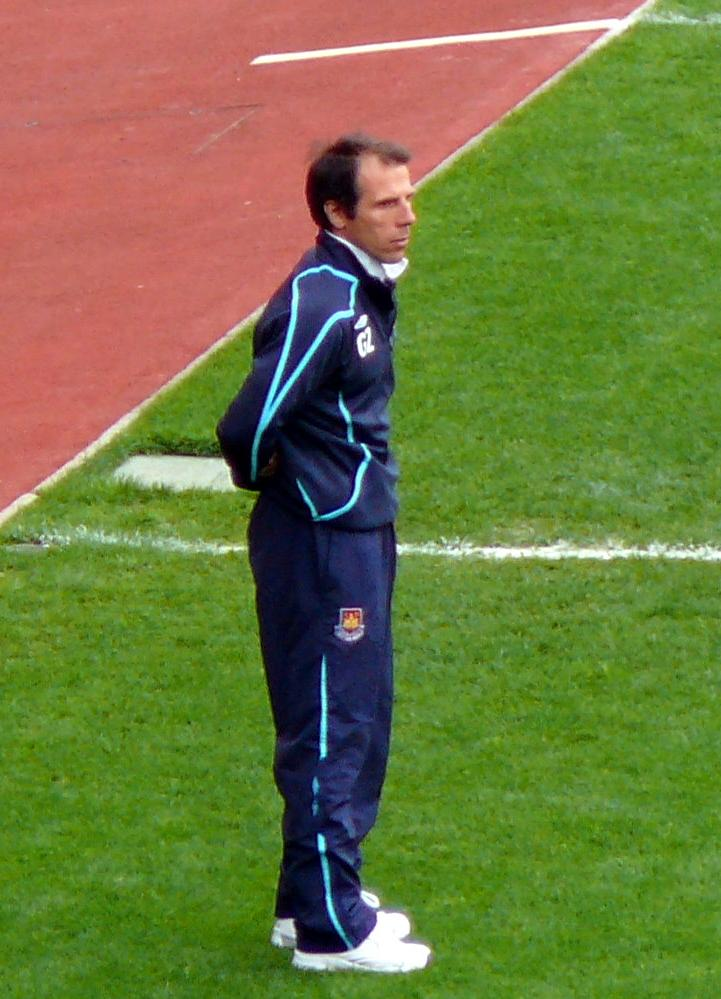
Zola at Upton Park

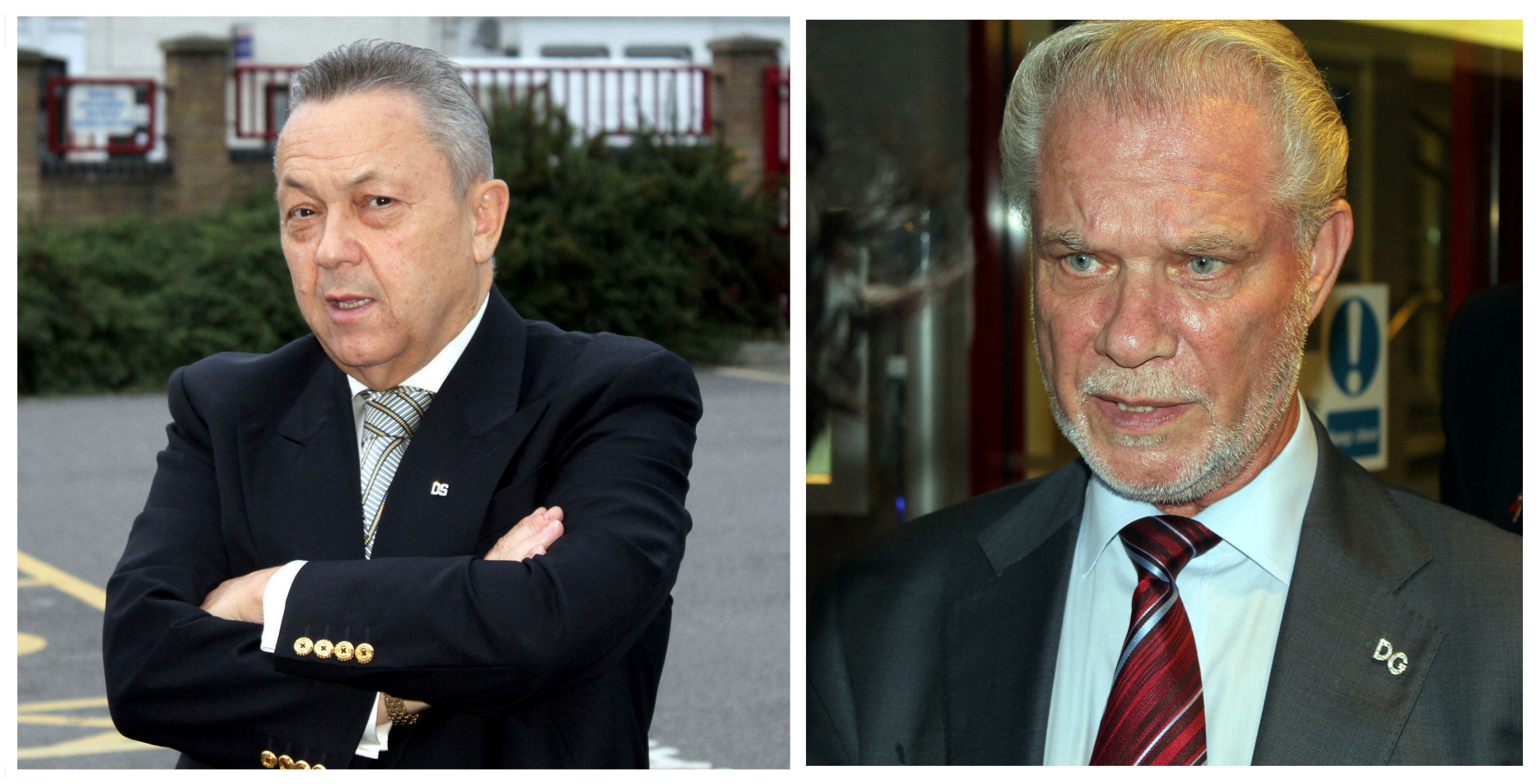
David Sullivan and David Gold

Despite a very shaky start under Zola's reign, the Hammers were able to finish comfortably midtable in his first season with the club. Although from the outset, Zola had already got a number of factors going against him, unlike previous managers at the club. West Ham were in a poor financial state due to the crash of former sponsor XL.com and of the Icelandic banks. Transfer fees and player wages had been generous for injury prone players such as Kieron Dyer and Freddie Ljungberg.

Zola faced many difficulties when it came to try and strengthen his already injury prone squad. Dean Ashton looked set to retire from the game, Craig Bellamy was not replaced and "new star" Savio Nsereko had several poor outings. This left Zola at the start of his first full season in charge with only Carlton Cole as his only experienced and tested option in attack. Help from sponsors SBOBET, however, allowed the club to fund the transfer of attacking option Alessandro Diamanti, whilst it was claimed Scott Duxbury funded himself, along with Footballing Director Gianluca Nani, the deal to bring in Guillermo Franco to ensure the Hammers had some strikers for the new season.

Despite a good start to the 2009–10 season against newly promoted Wolverhampton Wanderers with a 2–0 away win, the club went on to struggle badly in the first 12 games, picking up just one more win and finding themselves in the relegation mix around November 2009.

News of a possible takeover to save the Hammers was announced at the end of October, with an American group ready to launch a £120 million bid whilst former Birmingham City co-owner David Gold, a West Ham fan and previous share holder of club, also announced he would to be interested in taking control of the East London outfit with a rumoured bid of around £40 million being offered.

By December 2009, no takeover had happened and the current owners held creditors meetings to try to get the banks to give them more time to raise vital funds. Results on the pitch improved slightly with November finishing with two wins, one draw and one defeat, but Zola's men were given a swift reminder of the up hill battle they faced to survive in the Premier League at the hands of Manchester United, as they lost 4–0 at home. More bad luck followed with the loss of top goal scorer Carlton Cole for two months to injury along with young Zavon Hines with a knee injury, leaving Zola over the Christmas break with just Franco and Frank Nouble up front. West Ham also lost Valon Behrami for most of December along with facing a scare with goalkeeper Robert Green, who went off early during the Manchester United game. This since proved to be just down to illness rather than injury.

In January 2010, David Gold and Birmingham City co-chairman David Sullivan took a 50 percent holding of the club valuing it at £105 million. this gave them the final say on all matters at the club. West Ham won two games in February, against Birmingham and Hull City but then lost six consecutive games. However, wins in April against Sunderland and Wigan and a poor run of results by relegation rivals Hull City and Burnley ensured another season of Premier League football; West Ham finishing in 17th place, five points above the relegation places. West Ham's away record of only one away win all season equalled their lowest number of away wins for a season, last achieved in season 1960–61. On 11 May 2010, two days after the end of the 2009–10 season, West Ham announced the termination of manager Gianfranco Zola's contract with immediate effect.

== Avram Grant's management ==
=== 2010–2011 ===
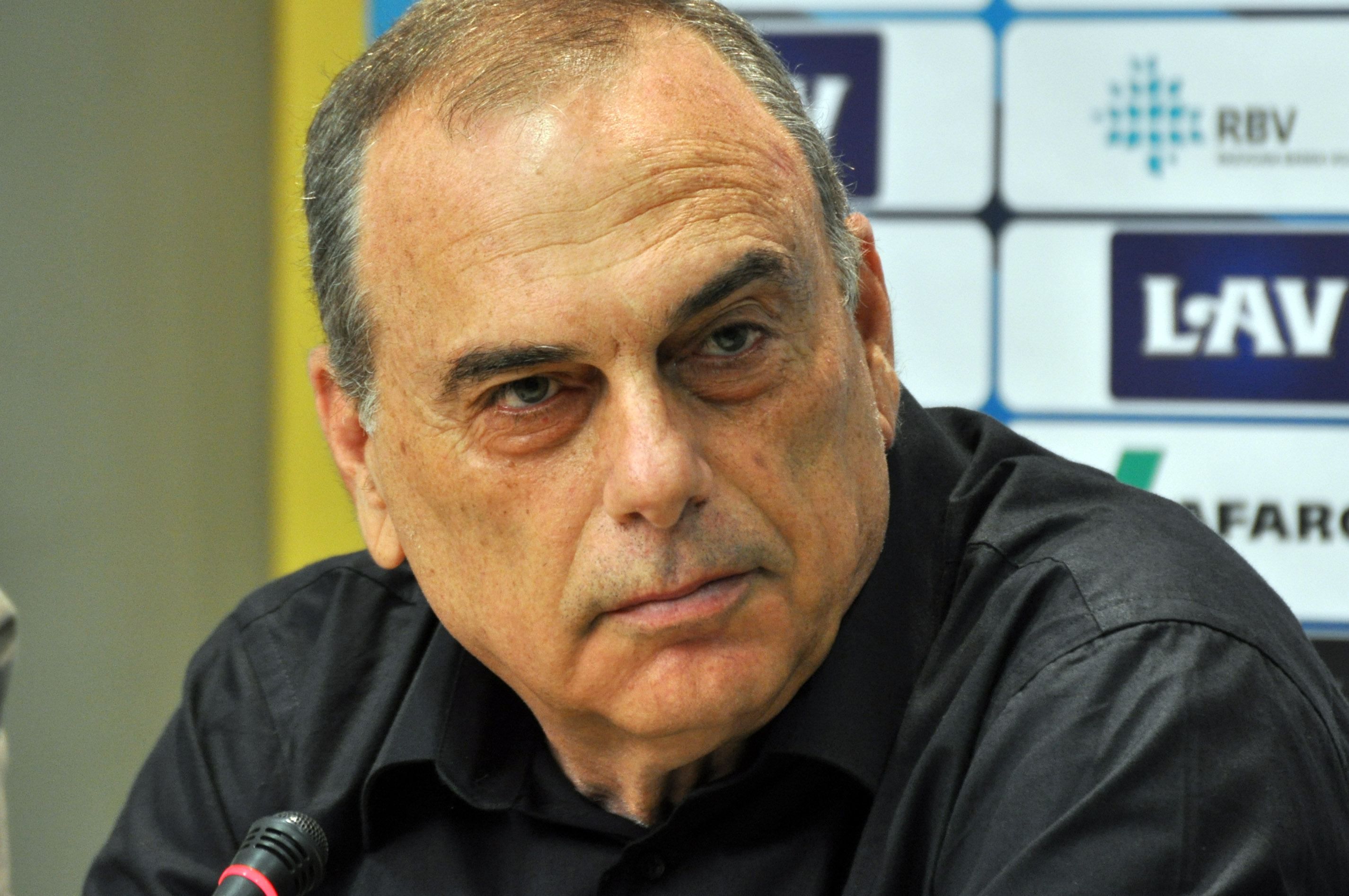
Avram Grant

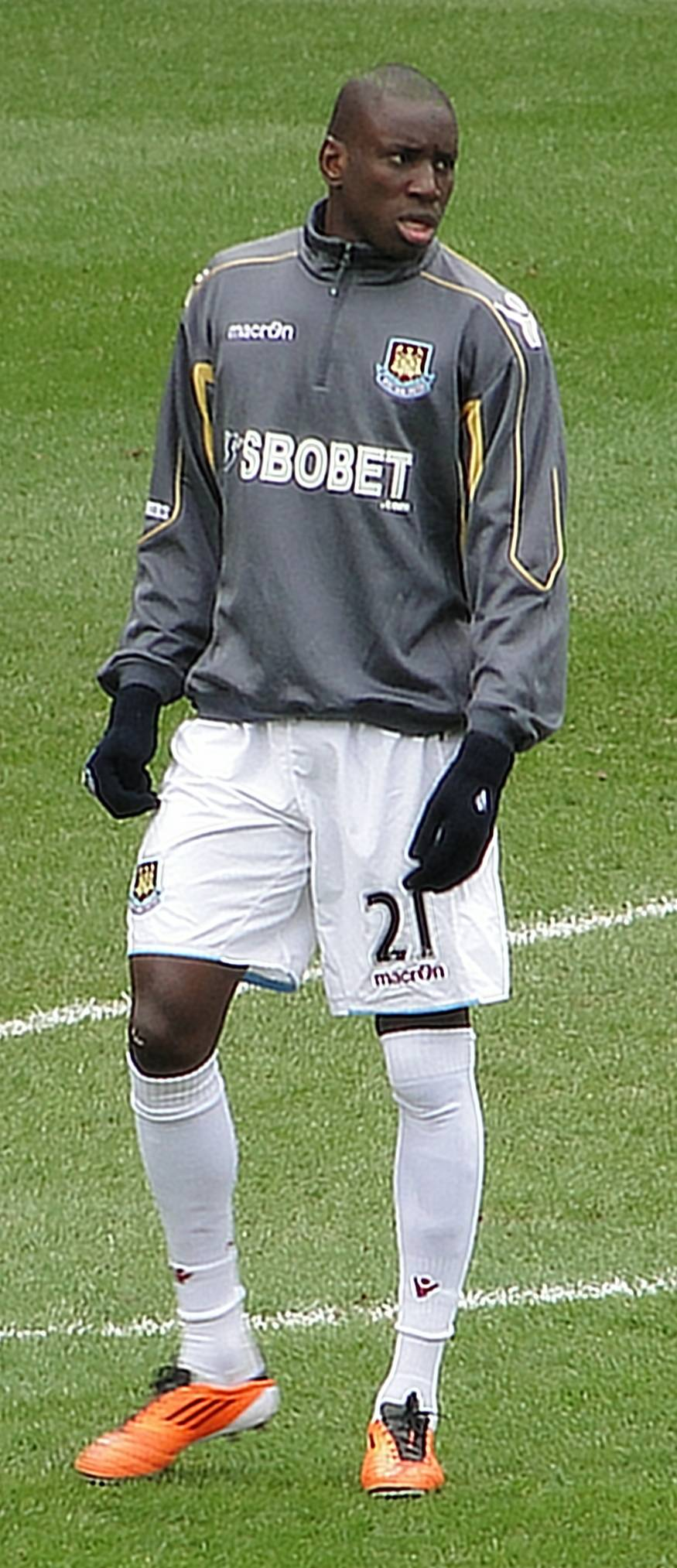
7 goals in 12 league games under Grant

On 3 June 2010, the Israeli Avram Grant signed a four-year deal with West Ham subject to a work permit, which was secured on 8 June. Upon signing, Grant said, "I am proud and honoured to be the manager of West Ham. It will be an exciting challenge and I'm ready to do my best." On 5 June 2010, Thomas Hitzlsperger became Grant's first signing at the club on a free transfer. On 16 July, Mexican international Pablo Barrera signed on a four-year contract, with a one-year extension option, for a fee of £4 million. Also on 16 July, Frédéric Piquionne joined West Ham from Lyon for an undisclosed fee on a three-year deal. In an attempt to bolster the side's defence, Grant signed compatriot Tal Ben Haim on loan from Championship side Portsmouth until January 2011. and New Zealand international Winston Reid. Reid signed a three-year contract for an undisclosed fee. On 27 August, Nigerian international Victor Obinna was signed on a season-long loan from Internazionale. and on 31 August, Danish international Lars Jacobsen signed a one-year deal on a free transfer from Blackburn. Grant's team did not win its first game until 25 September, moving off the bottom of the league by beating London rivals Tottenham 1–0 with a goal from Piquionne. With the club at the bottom end of the league, Crazy Gang member and Brentford manager Wally Downes was appointed as defensive coach. By 15 December, West Ham's league position saw no improvement and Grant was handed an unusual ultimatum: win one of the next three games or face the sack. These fixtures included an away game at Blackburn (drawn), another away game at Fulham (won) and a home game against Everton (drawn). Christmas saw West Ham at the bottom of the table, hoping to reverse the "curse of Christmas," where the team in that position is relegated at the end of the season. On 26 December, West Ham finally earned an away win in their 28th game since its last away victory; a 3–1 win at Craven Cottage against Fulham saw two goals by Carlton Cole and one from Piquionne. It marked the first time Cole scored two goals in a Premier League game. 1 January saw West Ham lift themselves out of the relegation zone and into 15th place with a 2–0 New Year's Day win over Wolves, with Freddie Sears scoring his first goal since March 2008. Still believing the problems lie with the defence, on 12 January Wayne Bridge signed on loan from Manchester City until the end of the season. Following two hefty losses to Newcastle and Arsenal, however, Grant's job again came under fire, with speculation that former Aston Villa and Celtic boss Martin O'Neill would be appointed manager.

The entire board is 100 percent behind Avram, he is a really decent person who deserves our support. West Ham United is a club that does the right thing and the right thing at this time is to support the manager.

— David Sullivan, West Ham co-owner

On 5 March, West Ham strung back-to-back Premier League wins together for the first time in the season, against Liverpool and Stoke City. January signing Demba Ba scored in both games, and following the Stoke game had scored four goals in four Premier League appearances. In May, Grant was booed by West Ham fans during his side's 1–1 home draw with Blackburn. The Hammers were in 20th, three points from 17th place with just two games remaining. On 15 May, West Ham's relegation to the Championship was confirmed following a comeback from Wigan at the DW Stadium. With West Ham leading 2–0 at half-time by two Demba Ba goals, Wigan battled back to win 3–2 thanks to an added-time strike from Charles N'Zogbia. Following the loss, West Ham announced the sacking of manager Grant, just one season into his tenure.

== Sam Allardyce's management ==
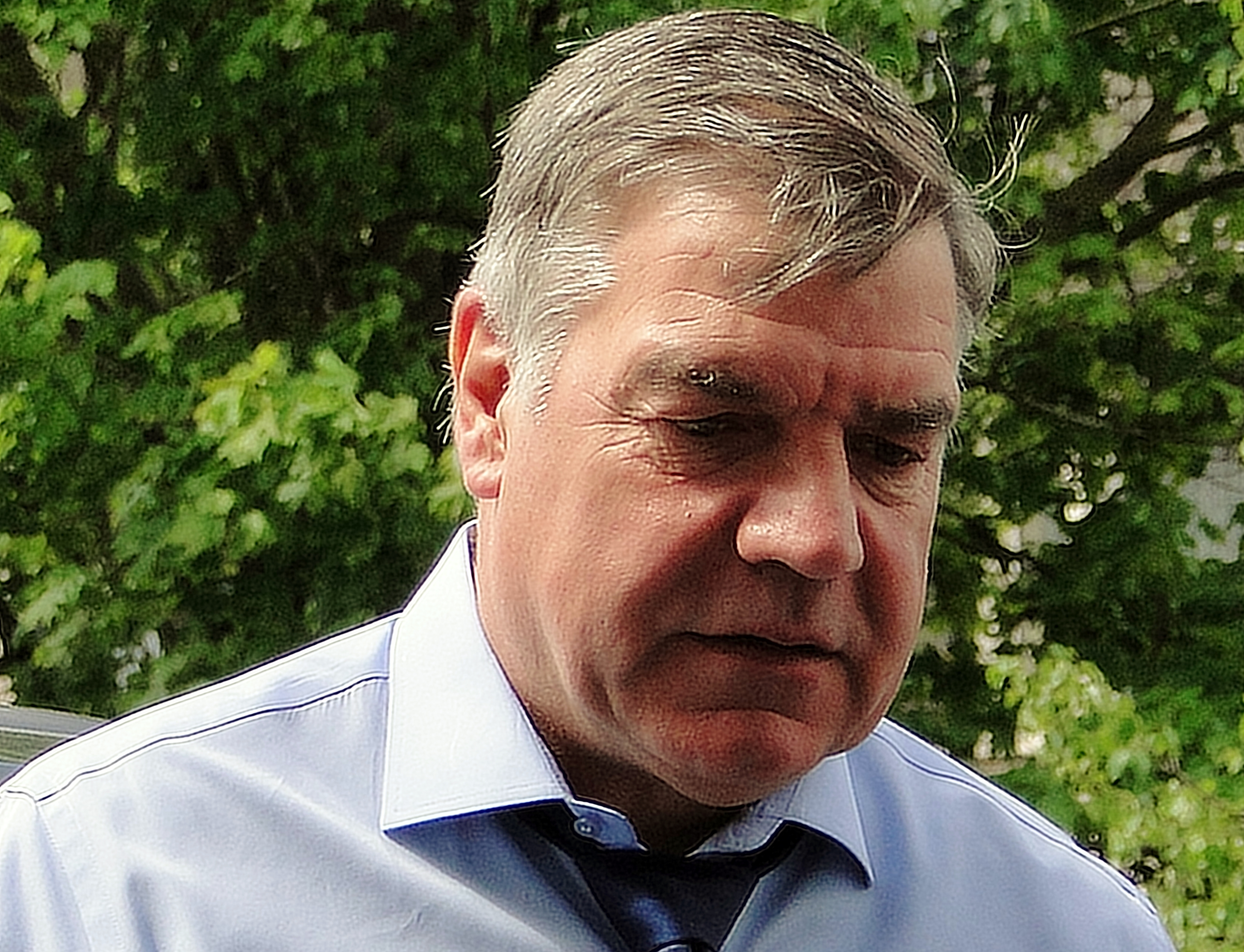
Sam Allardyce

=== 2011–12 ===
Following the dismissal of Grant, on 1 June 2011, West Ham appointed Sam Allardyce as their manager. He quickly reinforced his new side by signing Abdoulaye Faye, Kevin Nolan, Joey O'Brien and Matt Taylor. Faye, Nolan and O'Brien had all played under Allardyce at his former club Bolton, whilst Taylor was a Bolton player just after Allardyce had left the club. Allardyce's first game in charge, on 7 August 2011, was a loss by a late goal to Cardiff City. He then made striker John Carew West Ham's fifth signing of the season, on a free transfer, followed by defender George McCartney from Sunderland on a season-long loan, strikers Sam Baldock from Milton Keynes Dons and midfielder Papa Bouba Diop on a free transfer. He concluded his summer business with late scoops on deadline day for midfielders David Bentley from Tottenham and Henri Lansbury from Arsenal, both on season-long loans, and utility man Guy Demel from Hamburger SV for an undisclosed fee, making him Allardyce's 12th purchase of the 2011 summer transfer window. Nicky Maynard, Ricardo Vaz Tê and Ravel Morrison followed in the 2011 winter transfer window. In March 2012, despite standing in third place in the league, Allardyce's style of football was questioned, as it likewise was at his previous club Newcastle. Fans called for more passing of the ball and football played on the pitch, not in the air. They achieved a club record 13 away wins and finished third in the Championship behind Reading and Southampton, thus entering the play-offs.

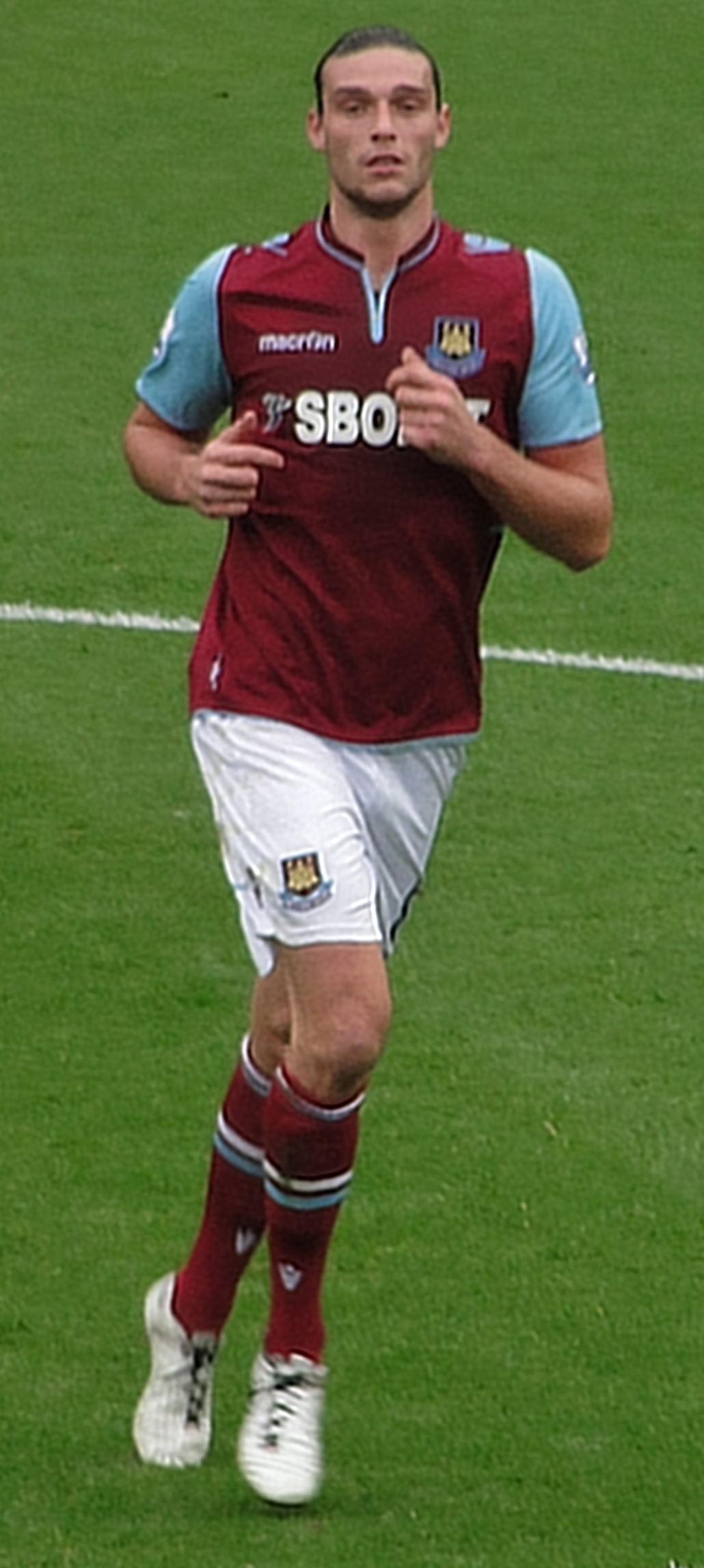
Andy Carroll

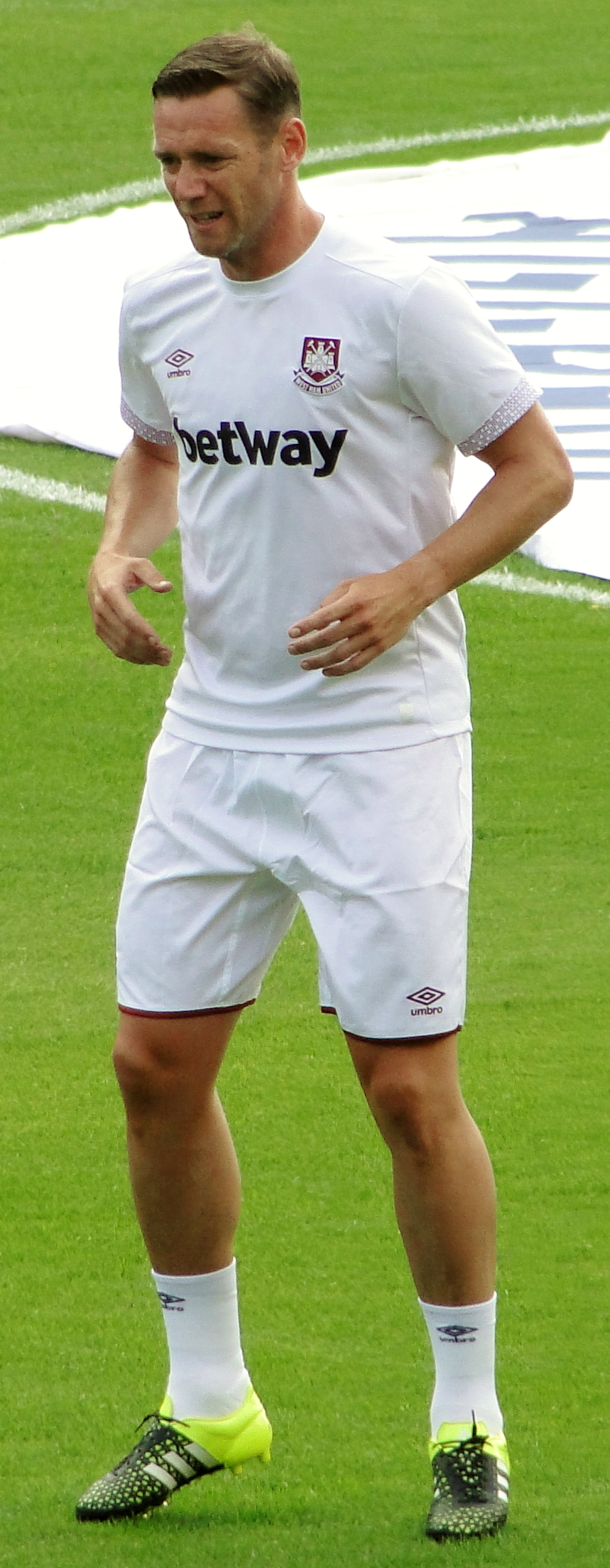
Kevin Nolan, captain and top scorer for the 2012–13 and 2013–14 seasons

In May 2012, West Ham were promoted back to the Premier League after only one season in the Championship after winning the 2012 Football League Championship play-off final.

=== 2012–13 ===
A busy transfer window for the summer of 2012 saw Allardyce bring in 11 players for West Ham, including Jussi Jääskeläinen, Mohamed Diamé, Modibo Maïga, James Collins, Alou Diarra, Matt Jarvis, Andy Carroll and Yossi Benayoun for his second stint.

The highlight of the first half of the season was a 3–1 home win against reigning European champions Chelsea on 1 December 2012, which saw them in eighth position and 12th at the end of the year. There was less activity in the January transfer window and although Allardyce brought in several loan players, the most significant deal was the return of former player Joe Cole from Liverpool. On 22 March 2013, West Ham secured a 99-year lease deal on London's Olympic Stadium, with it planned to be used as their home ground from the 2016–17 season. Tenth place was secured at the end of the season with nine home wins and only three away from home. Only 11 away goals were scored, the lowest of the entire league. In June 2013, long-time striker Carlton Cole was released by the club, having been with the side since July 2006.

=== 2013–14 ===
The pre-season again saw West Ham beating their transfer record with the purchase of Andy Carroll from Liverpool on 19 June 2013. Carroll signed a six-year contract with West Ham for a fee undisclosed by the club, believed to be at £15 million. July also saw the signing, "for about £5M," of Liverpool player and England international Stewart Downing. Several injuries prevented Carroll from playing again in 2013. He returned to training in November 2013 and was not expected to play again before January 2014. A shortage of available strikers required the re-signing of Carlton Cole and the signing of Croatian international Mladen Petrić in October 2013; both players were without a club, permitting their signatures outside of the transfer window. West Ham began the year poorly without Carroll, and by the end of 2013, they had won only three Premier League games and sitting in the relegation zone, 19th in the table. A run of four consecutive wins in February, however, saw West Ham pull away from the relegation zone, with manager Sam Allardyce awarded the Premier League Manager of the Month honour.

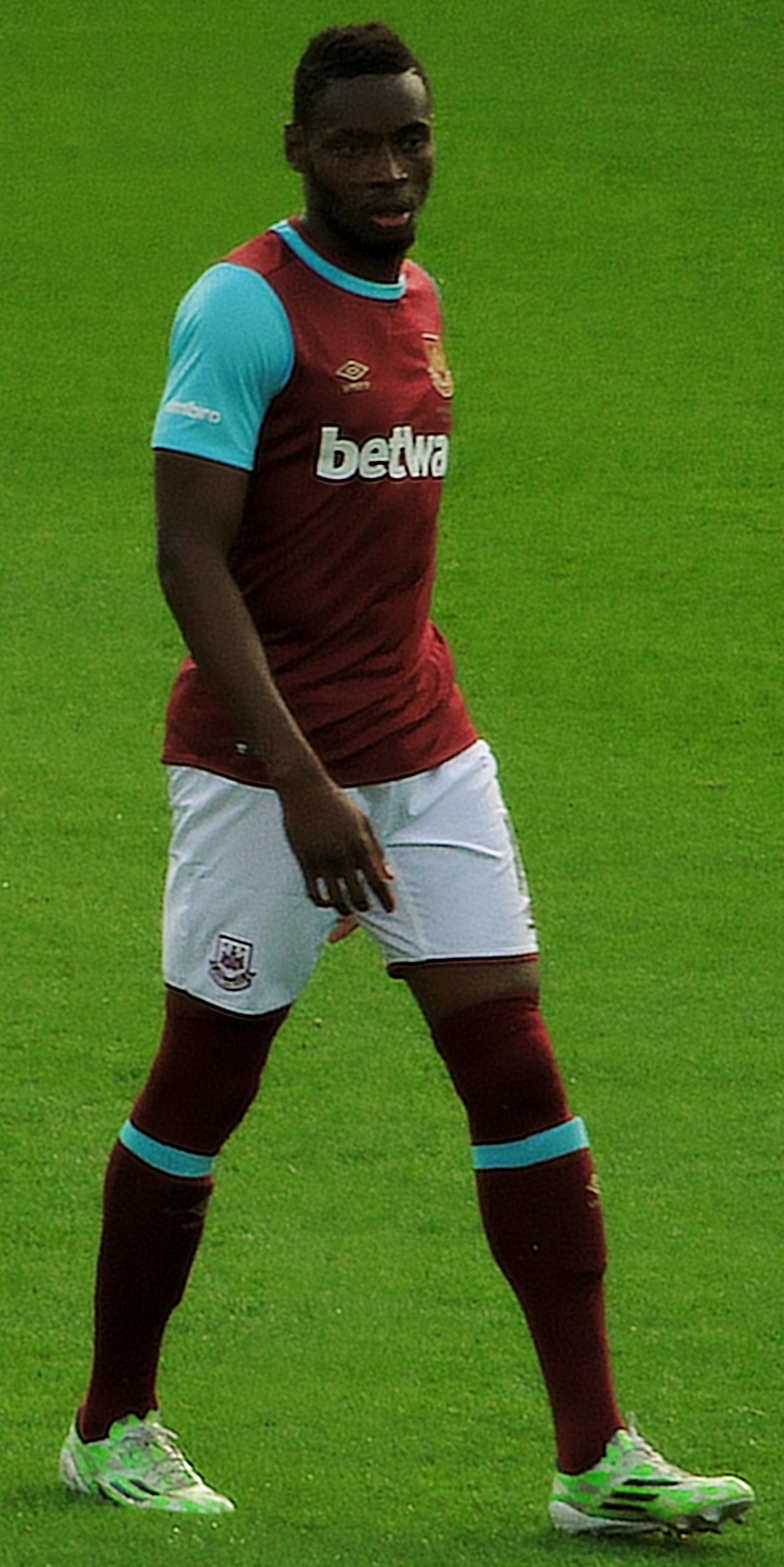
Diafra Sakho, West Ham's top scorer for the 2014–15 season.

The end of the season saw the Hammers finish 13th with 40 points. Kevin Nolan finished as the top scorer in the league with seven goals, followed by Carlton Cole, with six. The last months of the season also saw protests by some supporters against Allardyce and his perceived style of play. Banners calling for his dismissal were raised at an away game at The Hawthorns against West Brom and outside the home of club chairman, David Sullivan.

=== 2014–15 ===
Pre-season saw the purchase of Argentine player Mauro Zárate from Vélez Sarsfield; Cheikhou Kouyaté from Belgian champions Anderlecht on a four-year contract for an undisclosed fee; left back Aaron Cresswell from Ipswich Town on a five-year contract for an undisclosed fee; midfielder Diego Poyet, Charlton Athletic's Player of the Season for 2013–14, on a four-year contract; Ecuadorian Enner Valencia for an estimated £12 million fee from Mexican club Pachuca on a five-year contract; Carl Jenkinson of Arsenal on a season-long loan; Senegalese forward Diafra Sakho on a four-year contract from Metz for an undisclosed fee; and Alex Song from Barcelona on a season-long loan. The season began well for West Ham, and after 15 games they were in third place in the Premier League. Highlights in the early months had included victories against both the previous season's champions, Manchester City, and runners-up, Liverpool.

In the second half of the season, however, the club's form deteriorated, with Allardyce receiving criticism for the team's performances. In February 2015, the side exited the FA Cup in the fifth round following a 4–0 away defeat to West Brom. The season ended with West Ham in 12th position with 47 points. The top scorer was Diafra Sakho, with 12 goals in all competitions. Three minutes after the end of the final game of the season, a 2–0 away defeat to Newcastle, Allardyce announced his departure from the club with immediate effect.

== Slaven Bilić's management ==
=== 2015–16 ===
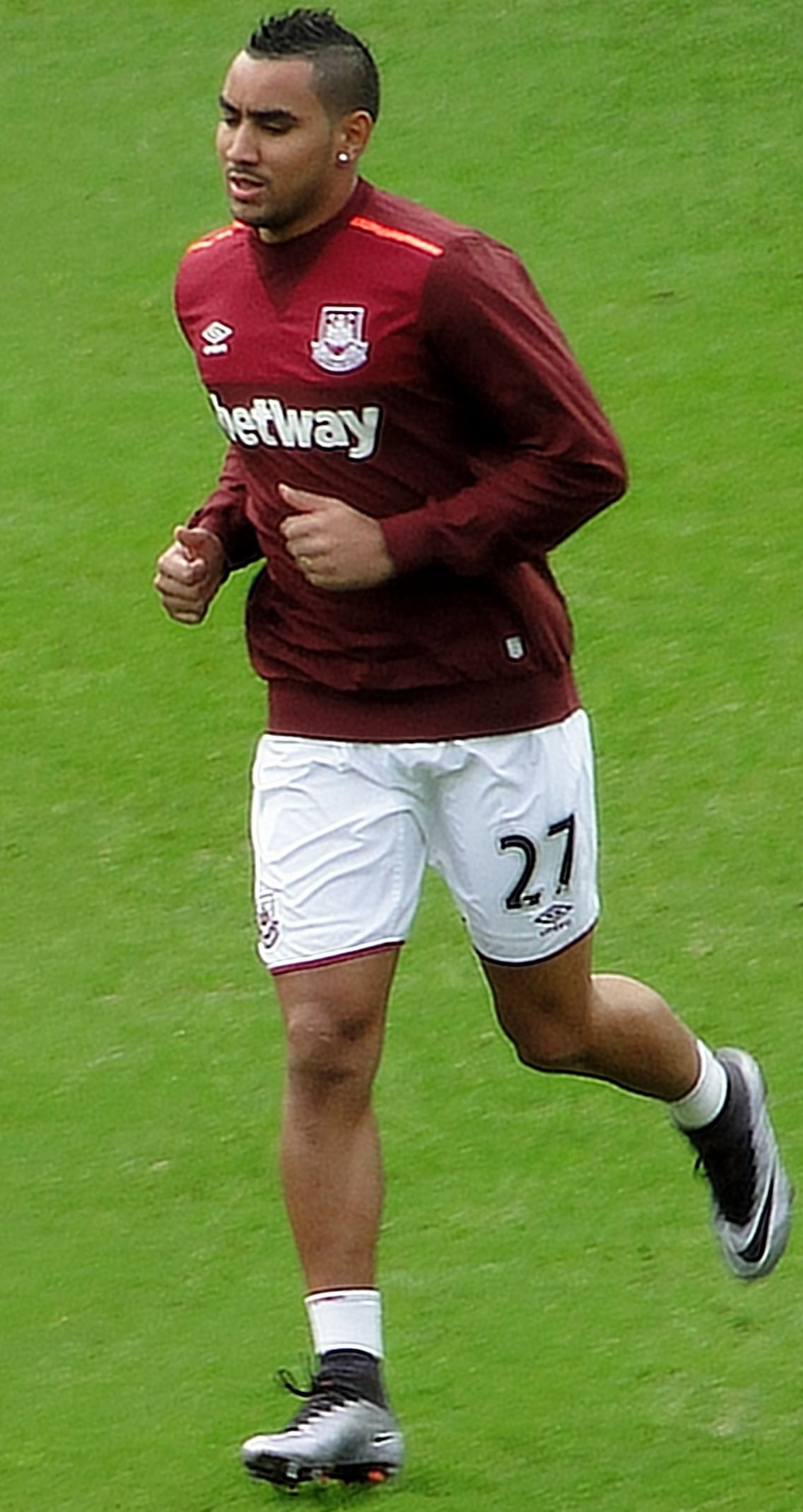
Dimitri Payet

In June 2015, West Ham announced former player Slaven Bilić as the club's new manager on a three-year contract. The following day, the first signing of the season was announced in midfielder Pedro Obiang from Sampdoria. Bilić's first game in charge was a 3–0 home win in the Europa League against Andorran side Lusitanos, although youth team coach Terry Westley took control of the side from the bench. Sixteen-year-old Reece Oxford made his debut in the game, becoming the youngest-ever player to play for West Ham. West Ham played six games in the Europa League before the 2015–16 Premier League began. They were knocked out in the third qualifying round by Romanian side Astra Giurgiu. New signings for the 2015–16 season included Angelo Ogbonna from Juventus, Darren Randolph from Birmingham City, Dimitri Payet from Marseille and Manuel Lanzini on loan from Al Jazira. Just days after their exit from the Europa League, West Ham played their first game of the Premier League season, winning 2–0 away against Arsenal. Premier League debutant Reece Oxford was named man of the match. Despite losing their next two league games, at home to Leicester City and Bournemouth, their fourth game resulted in a 3–0 away win against Liverpool at Anfield, their first win there since 1963. On 1 September, transfer deadline day, West Ham added four more players to their squad, bringing in Alex Song again on loan from Barcelona, Victor Moses on loan from Chelsea and the purchases of striker Nikica Jelavić from Hull City and midfielder Michail Antonio from Nottingham Forest.

During the 2015–16 winter transfer window, Sam Byram joined the club from Leeds United and Emmanuel Emenike was signed on loan from Fenerbahçe. West Ham finished 7th in the Premier League and qualified for the 2016–17 Europa League. Although finishing outside the places in the Premier League which would have qualified them for European competition, their place was gained following 5th placed Manchester United winning the 2016 FA Cup Final. After a run of poor results in the Premier League, culminating in a 4–1 home loss to Liverpool on 4 November 2017, Bilić was sacked. The announcement, made two days after the game, stated that "West Ham United can confirm that Slaven Bilic has today left his position with the club. West Ham United believe a change is now necessary in order for the club to move forward positively and in line with their ambition." He left the team with a record of 1.33 points per Premier League game, which is the best of any previous West Ham manager.

== David Moyes's management ==
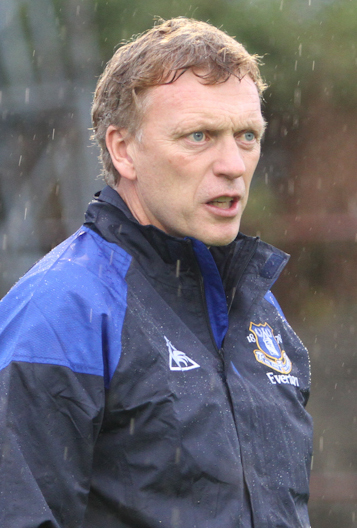
David Moyes

On 7 November 2017, David Moyes was appointed as manager. His first game on 17 November resulted in a 2–0 defeat by Watford. It was Moyes' 500th game as a manager, the result leaving West Ham in 18th place and a relegation position. Deciding on a change of formation, Moyes played a three-man defence allowing striker, Marko Arnautović to concentrate on his role as a goal scorer. By April 2018 he was one of the in-form players in the Premier League scoring nine goals in 14 games. A 3–1 win against Everton on the last day of the season, moved West Ham up to 13th place. After six months in charge and having secured a Premier League place for the following season, Moyes left. He had recorded nine wins and 10 draws from 31 games as West Ham manager. His only significant purchases for the club being the transfers of Jordan Hugill and Patrice Evra. The season had been marred with crowd protests and pitch invasions aimed at the board of directors and as a rejection of West Ham's move to the Olympic Stadium. This culminated on 10 March 2018 during a 3–0 home defeat by Burnley when fans invaded the pitch four times, protested against the board such that owner, David Sullivan was escorted from his seat and unfurled a banner saying "$old a dream given a nightmare".

== Manuel Pellegrini's management ==
West Ham owner, David Sullivan vowed to recruit as the next manager someone who had managed at the highest level and on 22 May 2018, Manuel Pellegrini signed a three-year contract. He had previously won the Premier League title and two EFL Cups with Manchester City. At the time he was believed to be the highest paid manager West Ham had engaged.

=== 2018–2019 ===
Compared with previous transfer windows there was a significant transfer budget in the summer of 2018 with the club twice breaking their record for the largest transfer fee paid. Players brought in included, Issa Diop for £22,000,000, a record fee, Łukasz Fabiański for £7,000,000, Ryan Fredericks, Jack Wilshere,Andriy Yarmolenko for £17,500,000, Fabián Balbuena, Felipe Anderson for £36,000,000, beating the record set for Issa Diop and Lucas Pérez for £4,000,000 The club also appointed a director of football, Mario Husillos to work with Pellegrini and to be in charge of player recruitment. West Ham finished 10th in the Premier League in Pellegrini's first season.

=== 2019–2020 ===
At the beginning of the season West Ham again broke their transfer record, this time with the transfer of Sébastien Haller for £45,000,000. This was in addition to the £24,000,000 paid for Pablo Fornals They also lost the previous season's top scorer, Marko Arnautović who signed for Shanghai SIPG for a fee of £22,400,000 The season started well and after seven games West Ham were third in the league. In their seventh game, a 2–2 draw with Bournemouth, goalkeeper, Łukasz Fabiański injured his thigh and was replaced by recent free signing, Roberto. He retained his place in goal with Fabianski's injury predicted to keep him out for up to two months, and several of his performances attracted criticism after he was deemed to be at fault for goals by Everton, Sheffield United, Newcastle United and Burnley where he pushed the ball into his own net for Burnley's third goal in a 3–0 victory; following yet more poor form he was dropped to the bench, with third-choice and recent signing, David Martin playing the fixture against Chelsea on 30 November. Having spent £155,000,000 during Pellegrini's time as manager, West Ham had seen little return from their big money transfers. By the end of December 2019 they were in 17th place, one point above the relegation places. Following a 2–1 home defeat by Leicester City, their ninth defeat in 12 games, Pellegrini was sacked after 18 months in charge.

== David Moyes's management (second spell) ==
On 30 December 2019, David Moyes was appointed as manager for a second time, signing an 18-month contract. West Ham won their first game with Moyes back as manager, a 4–0 home win against Bournemouth lifting them to 16th in the league. They would not win again for two months when a 3–1 home win against Southampton again lifted them out of the relegation places. One goal coming from the January 2020 transfer deadline day purchase, Jarrod Bowen, a £20,000,000 buy from Hull City. West Ham played a single game in March, a 1–0 defeat by Arsenal before the Premier League was halted on 13 March 2020 due to the COVID-19 pandemic. The season restarted on 20 June with West Ham losing 2–0 to Wolverhampton Wanderers, a result which kept them out of the relegation places only on goal difference. In a busy schedule in July, West Ham lost only one of seven games played, winning three and drawing three. They finished 16th in the Premier League with 39 points, their lowest in a top-flight campaign since 2010–11 when they gained 33 points and finished bottom of the table. In David Moyes' 19 games West Ham recorded one more Premier League point, 20, than in their 19 games during the season under Manuel Pellegrini where they gained 19 points. Ahead of the 2020–21 season, West Ham's ownership attracted criticism, including from club captain Mark Noble who publicly criticized the sale of academy graduate Grady Diangana. Despite losing the opening two games of the season, West Ham's form improved and by the end of November, the club sat in fifth place. The club would not drop out of a European spot for the rest of the season and went on to qualify for the 2021–22 UEFA Europa League group stages after finishing in 6th - exceeding many expectations. Moyes signed a new 3-year contract on 12 June 2021.

On 26 August 2021, West Ham were drawn in group H in the Europa League, alongside Dinamo Zagreb, Genk and Rapid Wien. 2021 culminated with West Ham sitting fifth in the Premier League, having reached the fifth round of the EFL Cup and winning group H of the Europa League. West Ham won their first three games of 2022, temporarily elevating the club to fourth place in the Premier League. On 10 March 2022, West Ham lost 1–0 away to Sevilla in the Europa League round of 16, before a 2–0 win after extra time seven days later secured West Ham's place in a European quarter-final for the first time in 41 years.

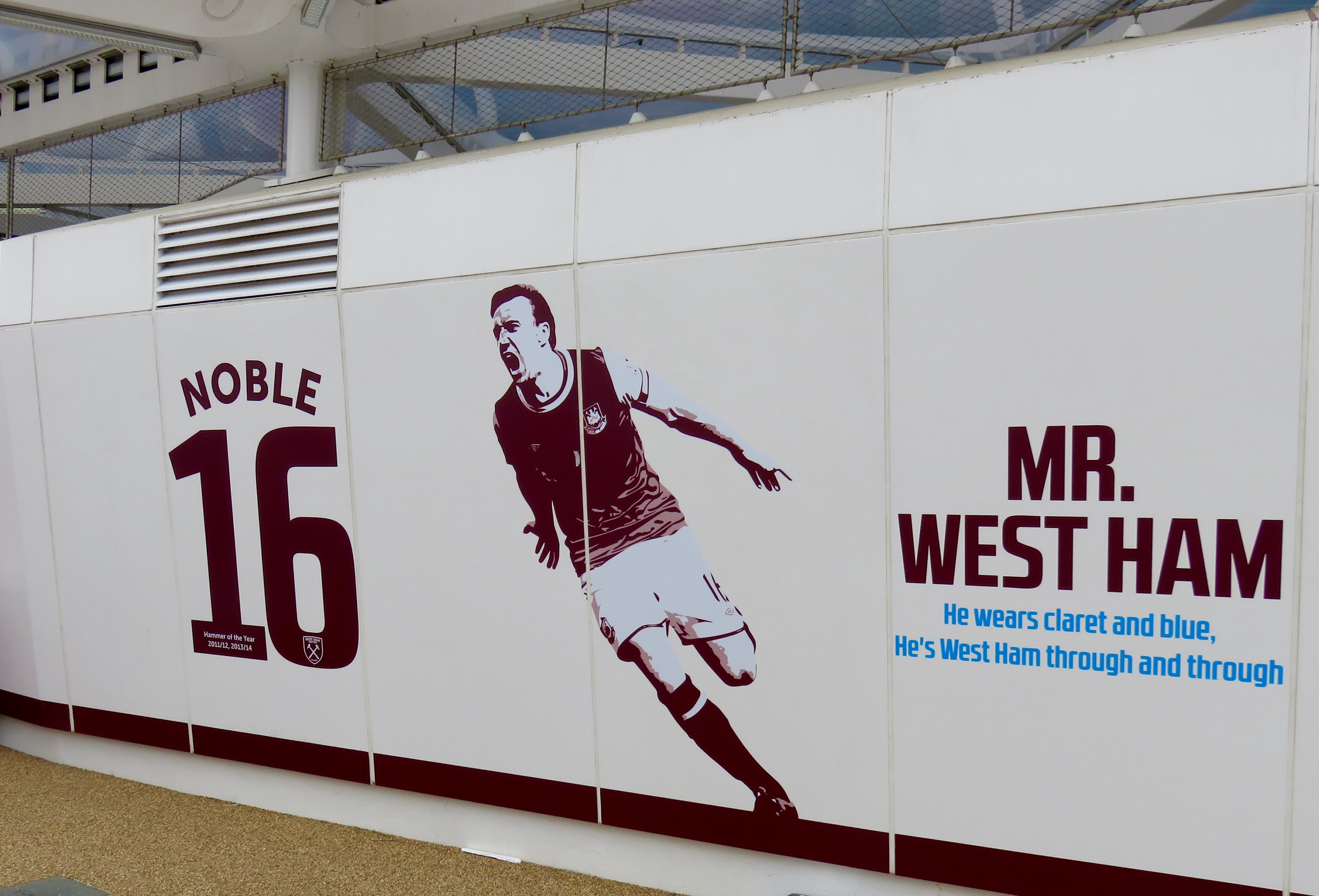
Mark Noble who retired in 2022 depicted outside the London Stadium

On 14 April 2022, following a 1–1 draw a week prior at the London Stadium, West Ham defeated French club Lyon 3–0 at the Parc Olympique Lyonnais to set up West Ham's first European semi-final since 1976. Playing the same opposition they met in their 1976 European Cup Winners' Cup semi-final, Eintracht Frankfurt, the Hammers were knocked out of the Europa League, following a 3–1 aggregate loss to the German side. At the end of the 2021–22 Premier League season, West Ham confirmed a second successive season of European football, qualifying for the UEFA Europa Conference League after finishing seventh. The season was also notable for being Mark Noble's final as a West Ham player, with the midfielder retiring from football after 18 years as a first team player at the club, making 550 appearances in all competitions, scoring 62 times.

The 2022–23 campaign was a mixed bag for the Hammers. The club finished 14th in the Premier League, only securing their Premier League status with two games remaining and exiting the League Cup to lower league opposition in a season that saw manager David Moyes come under pressure. In January 2023, Mark Noble returned to the club as sporting director. Despite the troubles in West Ham's domestic campaign, they excelled in the Europa Conference League. The club progressed to the final unbeaten, winning 13 games and drawing just once. They went on to win the competition, defeating Fiorentina 2–1 in the final to claim their first major trophy since 1980 and their first European trophy in 58 years.

== Bibliography ==
- Belton, Brian (2003). Founded on Iron: From Thames Ironworks to West Ham Utd. NPI Media Group. ISBN 978-0-7524-2928-1.
- Belton, Brian (2006). West Ham United Miscellany. Pennant Books. ISBN 0-9550394-4-4.
- Blows, Kirk; Hogg, Tony (2000). The Essential History of West Ham United. Headline. ISBN 0-7472-7036-8.
- Collins, Tony; Vamplew, Wray (2002). Mud, Sweat and Beers: A Cultural History of Sport and Alcohol. Berg Publishers. ISBN 978-1-85973-558-9.
- Hellier, John; Leatherdale, Clive (2000). West Ham United: The Elite Era – A Complete Record. Desert Island. ISBN 1-874287-31-7.
- Kerrigan, Colm (1997). Gatling Gun George Hilsdon. Football Lives. ISBN 0-9530718-0-4.
- Korr, Charles (1986). West Ham United. Gerald Duckworth & Co Ltd. ISBN 0-7156-2126-2.
- Nawrat, Chris; Hutchings, Steve (1996). The Sunday Times Illustrated History of Football. Hamlyn. ISBN 1-85613-341-9.
- Pickering, David (1994). The Cassell Soccer Companion. Cassell. ISBN 0-304-34231-9.
- Powles, John (2005). Iron in the Blood: Thames Ironworks FC, the Club That Became West Ham United. SoccerData. ISBN 978-1-899468-22-5.
- Powles, John (2008). Irons of the South. Nottingham: SoccerData. ISBN 978-1-905891-08-5.
- Redknapp, Harry; McGovern, Derek (1998). Harry Redknapp – My Autobiography. HarperCollins. ISBN 0-00-218872-4.
- Ward, Adam; Smith, Dave (2003). The Official West Ham United Dream Team. Hamlyn. ISBN 0-600-60835-2.

=== External sources ===
- West Ham United FC.com Official Site for current and latest news.
- Arnold Hills profile from International Vegetarian Union.
- Thames Ironworks community and sports driven activities courtesy of Portcities.org.uk as part of National Maritime Museum.
- West Ham Utd biographies at Spartacus Educational.
- West Ham Utd history 1985-1905 at Spartacus Educational.
- West Ham United F.C. Brief History and Player & People List as supplied by Lawrence Cook.
- Local History of the West Ham area as supplied by British History Online.
