= 2008 SE Palmeiras season =

Palmeiras
2008 season
- President: Afonso Della Monica
- Coach: Vanderlei Luxemburgo
- Stadium: Pacaembu
- Série A: 4th
- Campeonato Paulista: Champions
- Copa Sudamericana: Quarter-finals
- Copa do Brasil: Round of 16
- Top goalscorer: League: Alex Mineiro (18); All: Alex Mineiro (36)

The 2008 season is the 94th season in Palmeiras's existence, and their 93rd in Brazil's first division. They spent 1 season in Campeonato Brasileiro Série B in 2003

== Squad ==
=== Transfers ===
For recent transfers, see Brazilian Football Transfers 2008

=== Statistics ===
Last updated on 2008-07-07

No.	Pos.	Name	Brasileiro Série A		Copa do Brasil		Campeonato Paulista		Copa Libertadores		Total	
No.	Pos.	Name	Apps	Goals	Apps	Goals	Apps	Goals	Apps	Goals	Apps	Goals
1	GK	(Brazil) Diego Cavalieri	0	0	0	0	10	-7	0	0	10	-7
2	DF	(Brazil) Élder Granja	8	0	4	0	21	1	0	0	33	1
3	DF	(Brazil) Gustavo	6	0	4	0	20	1	0	0	30	1
4	DF	(Brazil) Dininho	0	0	0	0	6	0	0	0	6	0
5	MF	(Brazil) Pierre	8	0	3	0	17	1	0	0	28	1
6	DF	(Brazil) Leandro	8	0	4	0	22	1	0	0	34	1
7	MF	(Brazil) Diego Souza	7	2	4	1	17	5	0	0	28	8
8	MF	(Brazil) Makelele	0	0	1	0	11	0	0	0	12	0
9	FW	(Brazil) Alex Mineiro	9	6	4	3	21	15	0	0	34	24
10	MF	(Chile) Valdívia	7	1	4	1	18	8	0	0	29	10
11	MF	(Brazil) Martinez	8	0	3	1	18	0	0	0	29	1
12	GK	(Brazil) Marcos	9	-9	3	-5	15	-11	0	0	27	-25
13	DF	(Brazil) Wendel	2	0	2	0	14	0	0	0	18	0
14	DF	(Brazil) David	2	1	0	0	5	1	0	0	7	2
15	MF	(Brazil) Deyvid Sacconi	0	0	0	0	2	0	0	0	2	0
16	DF	(Brazil) Valmir	0	0	0	0	2	0	0	0	2	0
17	DF	(Brazil) Maurício	2	0	0	0	2	0	0	0	4	0
18	MF	(Brazil) Francis	0	0	1	0	2	0	0	0	3	0
19	MF	(Brazil) Denílson	8	2	4	0	14	3	0	0	26	5
20	MF	(Brazil) Sandro Silva	3	0	0	0	0	0	0	0	3	0
21	DF	(Brazil) Fabinho Capixaba	3	0	0	0	0	0	0	0	3	0
22	GK	(Brazil) Bruno Cardoso	0	0	0	0	0	0	0	0	0	0
23	FW	(Brazil) Lenny	7	0	2	0	13	0	0	0	22	0
25	FW	(Brazil) Jorge Preá	1	0	1	0	5	1	0	0	7	1
26	DF	(Brazil) Nen	0	0	0	3	0	0	0	0	0	0
27	MF	(Brazil) Léo Lima	8	1	3	0	14	1	0	0	25	2
28	DF	(Brazil) Henrique	5	0	4	0	16	0	0	0	25	0
30	FW	(Brazil) Kléber	6	1	4	1	9	3	0	0	19	5
--	DF	(Brazil) Amaral	0	0	0	0	0	0	0	0	0	0
--	FW	(Brazil) Max	0	0	0	0	0	0	0	0	0	0
--	MF	(Brazil) William	0	0	0	0	5	1	0	0	5	1
--	FW	(Brazil) Luiz Henrique	0	0	0	0	4	0	0	0	4	0
--	FW	(Brazil) Osmar	0	0	0	0	3	0	0	0	3	0
--	MF	(Brazil) Jumar	2	0	0	0	0	0	0	0	2	0
--	DF	(Brazil) Gladstone	2	0	0	0	0	0	0	0	2	0
--	MF	(Brazil) Evandro	1	0	0	0	0	0	0	0	1	0
--	DF	(Brazil) Jeci	1	0	0	0	0	0	0	0	1	0
--	DF	(Brazil) Jefferson	1	0	0	0	0	0	0	0	1	0

== Season ==
=== Campeonato Paulista ===
==== Matches ====
17 January 2008
19:30 (UTC-3)

Palmeiras	3–1	Sertãozinho
Alex Mineiro 2' 18' William 21'	report (pt)	Marcos Denner 40'

Arena Barueri - Barueri
Attendance: 8.020
Referee: Cleber Wellington Abade

20 January 2008
16:00 (UTC-3)

Santos	0–0	Palmeiras
	report (pt)

Vila Belmiro - Santos
Attendance: 11.407
Referee: José Henrique de Carvalho

23 January 2008
19:30 (UTC-3)

Marília	0–1	Palmeiras
	report (pt)	Élder Granja 31'

Bento de Abreu - Marília
Attendance: 8.146
Referee: José Roberto Marques

26 January 2008
20:30 (UTC-3)

Palmeiras	2–2	Mirassol
Gustavo 37'; Alex Mineiro 80'	report (pt)	Montoya 35'; Léo Mineiro 86'

Arena Barueri - Barueri
Attendance: 6.915
Referee: Antônio Rogério Batista do Prado

30 January 2008
17:30 (UTC-3)

Palmeiras	0–1	Ituano
	report (pt)	Felipe 10'

Barão da Serra Negra - Piracicaba
Attendance: 12.842
Referee: Claudinei Foratti da Silva

2 February 2008
18:10 (UTC-3)

Noroeste	1–0	Palmeiras
Vandinho 84'	report (pt)

Dr. Alfredo de Castilho - Bauru
Attendance: 10.042
Referee: Robério Pereira Pires

6 February 2008
21:45 (UTC-3)

Palmeiras	0–3	Guaratinguetá
	report (pt)	Michael 29', 81'; Alê 38'

Teixeirão - São José do Rio Preto
Attendance: 12.527
Referee: Rodrigo Braghetto

9 February 2008
20:30 (UTC-3)

Palmeiras	3–1	Guarani
Alex Mineiro 48', 54', 78'	report (pt)	Paulo Santos 89'

Teixeirão - São José do Rio Preto
Attendance: 13.000
Referee: Leonardo Ferreira de Lima

16 February 2008
18:10 (UTC-3)

Juventus	0–4	Palmeiras
	report (pt)	Diego Souza 9'; Alex Mineiro 31'; Valdivia 79'; David 83'

Santa Cruz - Ribeirão Preto
Attendance: 20.883
Referee: Paulo César de Oliveira

20 February 2008
21:45 (UTC-3)

Rio Claro	1–1	Palmeiras
Chumbinho 62'	report (pt)	Diego Souza 31'

Augusto Schimidt - Rio Claro
Attendance: 8.265
Referee: Milton Etsuo Ballerini

23 February 2008
20:30 (UTC-3)

Palmeiras	1–1	Rio Preto
Valdivia 68'	report (pt)	Xandão 74'

Parque Antarctica - São Paulo
Attendance: 23.033
Referee: Paulo Roberto Ferreira

2 March 2008
16:00 (UTC-3)

Corinthians	0–1	Palmeiras
	report (pt)	Valdivia 74'

Morumbi - São Paulo
Attendance: 48.930
Referee: Rodrigo Braghetto

9 March 2008
16:00 (UTC-3)

Bragantino	2–5	Palmeiras
Paulinho 17'; Nunes 26' (pen.)	report (pt)	Diego Souza 36'; Valdivia 39'; Leandro 48'; Denilson 77', 90+2'

Marcelo Stéfani - Bragança Paulista
Attendance: 6.617
Referee: Paulo César de Oliveira

12 March 2008
21:45 (UTC-3)

Palmeiras	2–1	Ponte Preta
Alex Mineiro 33'; Kléber 65'	report (pt)	Elias 16'

Parque Antarctica - São Paulo
Attendance: 13.396
Referee: Luiz Flávio de Oliveira

16 March 2008
16:00 (UTC-3)

Palmeiras	4–1	São Paulo
Kléber 43'; Denilson 77'; Valdivia 85'; Diego Souza 90+5'	report (pt)	Adriano 38'

Santa Cruz - Ribeirão Preto
Attendance: 28.422
Referee: Flávio Rodrigues Guerra

23 March 2008
18:10 (UTC-3)

Paulista	0–2	Palmeiras
	report (pt)	Alex Mineiro 5'; Valdivia 18'

Jaime Cintra - Jundiaí
Attendance: 12.022
Referee: Eduardo César Coronado Coelho

26 March 2008
21:45 (UTC-3)

Palmeiras	1–0	Portuguesa
Jorge Preá 90+3'	report (pt)

Parque Antarctica - São Paulo
Attendance: 19.061
Referee: José Henrique de Carvalho

29 March 2008
16:00 (UTC-3)

Palmeiras	3–1	São Caetano
Alex Mineiro 23'; Pierre 37'; Valdivia 69'	report (pt)	Douglas 76'

Parque Antarctica - São Paulo
Attendance: 23.027
Referee: Robério Pereira Pires

6 April 2008
16:00 (UTC-3)

Grêmio Barueri	0–3	Palmeiras
	report (pt)	Léo Lima 48'; Alex Mineiro 52'; Diego Souza 89'

Arena Barueri - Barueri
Attendance: 8.991
Referee: Guilherme Cereta de Lima

=== Campeonato Paulista-Semi Final 1st leg ===
13 April 2008
16:00 (UTC-3)

São Paulo	2–1	Palmeiras
Adriano 12', 47'	report (pt)	Alex Mineiro 77'

Morumbi - São Paulo
Attendance: 37.203
Referee: Paulo César de Oliveira

=== Campeonato Paulista-Semi Final 2nd leg ===
20 April 2008
16:00 (UTC-3)

Palmeiras	2–0	São Paulo
Léo Lima 22'; Valdivia 84'	report (pt)

Parque Antarctica - São Paulo
Attendance: 27.680
Referee: Wilson Luiz Seneme

=== Campeonato Paulista-Final 1st leg ===
27 April 2008
16:00 (UTC-3)

Ponte Preta	0–1	Palmeiras
	report (pt)	Kléber 20'

Moisés Lucarelli - Campinas
Attendance: 19.111
Referee: Luiz Flávio de Oliveira

=== Campeonato Paulista-Final 2nd leg ===
4 May 2008
16:00 (UTC-3)

Palmeiras	5–0	Ponte Preta
Ricardo Conceição 10' o.g Alex Mineiro 33', 75', 77'; Valdivia 72'	report (pt)

Parque Antarctica - São Paulo
Attendance: 27.927
Referee: Cléber Wellington Abade

== League table ==
Pos	Team	Pld	W	D	L	GF	GA	GD	Pts	Qualification or relegation
1	Guaratinguetá	19	13	1	5	27	14	+13	40	Advances to Semifinals
2	Palmeiras	19	12	4	3	36	16	+20	40	Advances to Semifinals
3	São Paulo	19	11	5	3	31	22	+9	38	Advances to Semifinals
4	Ponte Preta	19	10	5	4	36	23	+13	35	Advances to Semifinals
5	Corinthians	19	9	6	4	24	15	+9	33	
6	Barueri	19	10	2	7	34	24	+10	32	Qualification for Campeonato do Interior
7	Santos	19	9	4	6	28	23	+5	31	
8	Mirassol	19	9	2	8	29	28	+1	29	Qualification for Campeonato do Interior
9	Noroeste	19	8	5	6	29	23	+6	29	Qualification for Campeonato do Interior
10	Portuguesa	19	7	7	5	21	17	+4	28	
11	Ituano	19	8	2	9	24	32	−8	26	Qualification for Campeonato do Interior
12	Paulista	19	7	4	8	24	24	0	25	
13	Bragantino	19	7	4	8	26	27	−1	25	
14	Marília	19	7	1	11	21	20	+1	22	
15	São Caetano	19	5	5	9	16	30	−14	20	
16	Guarani	19	5	4	10	20	31	−11	19	
17	Juventus	19	4	5	10	21	36	−15	17	Relegation to Campeonato Paulista Série A2
18	Rio Preto	19	4	3	12	16	28	−12	15	Relegation to Campeonato Paulista Série A2
19	Sertãozinho	19	4	3	12	16	30	−14	15	Relegation to Campeonato Paulista Série A2
20	Rio Claro	19	3	4	12	16	32	−16	13	Relegation to Campeonato Paulista Série A2

Updated to match(es) played on April 6, 2008. Source: RSSSF Brazil
Rules for classification: 1st points; 2nd wins; 3rd goal difference; 4th goals scored

=== Results summary ===
Overall								Home						Away					
Pld	W	D	L	GF	GA	GD	Pts	W	D	L	GF	GA	GD	W	D	L	GF	GA	GD
19	12	4	3	36	16	+20	40	6	2	2	19	12	+7	6	2	1	17	4	+13

Last updated: 6 June 2008.
Source: Campeonato Paulista 2008

Pld = Matches played; W = Matches won; D = Matches drawn; L = Matches lost;

=== Copa do Brasil ===
==== First round ====
27 February 2008
21:45 (UTC-3)

CENE-MS	0–2	Palmeiras
	report (pt)	49' (o.g.) Evandro; 61' Diego Souza

Morenão - Campo Grande-MS
Attendance: n/a
Referee: Gutemburg de P. Fonseca

==== Second round ====
2 April 2008
21:45 (UTC-3)

Central-PE	1–5	Palmeiras
Williams 11'	report (pt)	18' Kléber; 42' Valdívia; 80' Martinez; 85' & 89' Alex Mineiro

Luiz Lacerda - Caruaru
Attendance: n/a
Referee: Andre Luiz de Freitas Castro

==== Round of 16 ====
24 April 2008
21:30 (UTC-3)

Palmeiras	0–0	Sport
	report (pt)

Parque Antarctica - São Paulo
Attendance: 16.038
Referee: Djalma Jose Beltrami Teixeira

30 April 2008
21:50 (UTC-3)

Sport	4–1	Palmeiras
Romerito 7', 31', 42'; Dutra 65'	report (pt)	Alex Mineiro 15'

Ilha do Retiro - Recife-PE
Attendance: 34.009
Referee: Heber Roberto Lopes

=== Campeonato Brasileiro Série A ===
==== Matches ====
11 May 2008
16:00 (UTC-3)

Coritiba	2–0	Palmeiras
Michael 53'; Hugo 83'	report (pt)

Couto Pereira - Curitiba-PR
Attendance: 31.660
Referee: Ricardo Marques Ribeiro

18 May 2008
18:10 (UTC-3)

Palmeiras	2–1	Internacional
Denílson 19'; Alex Mineiro 60'	report (pt)	45+2' Índio

Parque Antarctica - São Paulo
Attendance: 10.116
Referee: Marcelo de Lima Henrique

25 May 2008
18:10 (UTC-3)

Portuguesa	1–1	Palmeiras
Diogo 59'	report (pt)	20' David

Pacaembu - São Paulo
Attendance: 6.429
Referee: Sálvio Spinola Fagundes Filho

1 June 2008
18:10 (UTC-3)

Palmeiras	1–0	Atlético-PR
Alex Mineiro 55'	report (pt)

Parque Antarctica - São Paulo
Attendance: 6.264
Referee: Giulliano Bozzano

8 June 2008
16:00 (UTC-3)

Sport	2–0	Palmeiras
Luciano Henrique 59'; Roger 87'	report (pt)

Ilha do Retiro - Recife
Attendance: 17.899
Referee: Jaílson Macedo Freitas

12 June 2008
20:30 (UTC-3)

Palmeiras	5–2	Cruzeiro
Alex Mineiro 29', 87'; Valdivia 57'; Diego Souza 67'; Henrique 79'	report (pt)	Guilherme 16'; Charles 77'

Parque Antarctica - São Paulo
Attendance: 6.272
Referee: Heber Roberto Lopes

22 June 2008
16:00 (UTC-3)

Vasco	0–2	Palmeiras
	report (pt)	Alex Mineiro 36'; Kléber 75'

São Januário - Rio de Janeiro
Attendance: 5.348
Referee: Carlos Eugênio Simom

29 June 2008
18:10 (UTC-3)

Palmeiras	2–0	Náutico
Alex Mineiro 45'; Denílson 87'	report (pt)

Parque Antarctica - São Paulo
Attendance: 14.186
Referee: Djalma José Beltrami Teixeira

6 July 2008
16:00 (UTC-3)

Atlético Mineiro	1–1	Palmeiras
Eduardo 12'	report (pt)	Diego Souza 81'

Mineirão - Minas Gerais
Attendance: 31.570
Referee: Evandro Rogério Roman

10 July 2008
20:30 (UTC-3)

Palmeiras	1-1	Figueirense
Mineiro 70'	(pt)	Xavier 61'

Parque Antarctica - São Paulo
Attendance: 19.012
Referee: Hector Lopes

== League table ==
Pos	Team	Pld	W	D	L	GF	GA	GD	Pts	Qualification or relegation
1	São Paulo	38	21	12	5	66	36	+30	75	Copa Libertadores 2009
2	Grêmio	38	21	9	8	59	35	+24	72	Copa Libertadores 2009
3	Cruzeiro	38	21	4	13	59	44	+15	67	Copa Libertadores 2009
4	Palmeiras	38	19	8	11	55	45	+10	65	Copa Libertadores 2009
5	Flamengo	38	18	10	10	67	48	+19	64	Copa Sudamericana 2009
6	Internacional	38	15	9	14	48	47	+1	54	Copa Sudamericana 2009
7	Botafogo	38	15	8	15	51	44	+7	53	Copa Sudamericana 2009
8	Goiás	38	14	11	13	57	47	+10	53	Copa Sudamericana 2009
9	Coritiba	38	14	11	13	55	48	+7	53	Copa Sudamericana 2009
10	Vitória	38	15	7	16	48	44	+4	52	Copa Sudamericana 2009
11	Sport	38	14	10	14	48	45	+3	52	Copa Libertadores 2009
12	Atlético Mineiro	38	12	12	14	50	61	−11	48	Copa Sudamericana 2009
13	Atlético Paranaense	38	12	9	17	45	54	−9	45	Copa Sudamericana 2009
14	Fluminense	38	11	12	15	49	48	+1	45	Copa Sudamericana 2009
15	Santos	38	11	12	15	44	53	−9	45	
16	Náutico	38	11	11	16	44	54	−10	44	
17	Figueirense	38	11	11	16	49	72	−23	44	Relegation to Série B
18	Vasco da Gama	38	11	7	20	56	72	−16	40	Relegation to Série B
19	Portuguesa	38	9	11	18	48	70	−22	38	Relegation to Série B
20	Ipatinga	38	9	8	21	37	66	−29	35	Relegation to Série B

Source: rsssfbrasil.com
Rules for classification: 1) points; 2) goal difference; 3) number of goals scored.

=== Results summary ===
Overall								Home						Away					
Pld	W	D	L	GF	GA	GD	Pts	W	D	L	GF	GA	GD	W	D	L	GF	GA	GD
9	5	2	2	14	9	+5	17	4	0	0	10	3	+7	1	2	2	4	6	−2

Last updated: 2008-07-07.
Source: Campeonato Brasileiro Série A 2008

Pld = Matches played; W = Matches won; D = Matches drawn; L = Matches lost;

=== Results by round ===
Round	1	2	3	4	5	6	7	8	9	10	11	12	13	14	15	16	17	18	19	20	21	22	23	24	25	26	27	28	29	30	31	32	33	34	35	36	37	38
Ground	A	H	A	H	A	H	A	H	A																													
Result	L	W	D	W	L	W	W	W	D																													

Updated to match(es) played on 2008-07-07. Source: 2008 Campeonato Brasileiro Série A
A = Away; H = Home; W = Win; D = Draw; L = Loss
