= 2006–07 Süper Lig =

49th season of top-tier Turkish football

Süper Lig
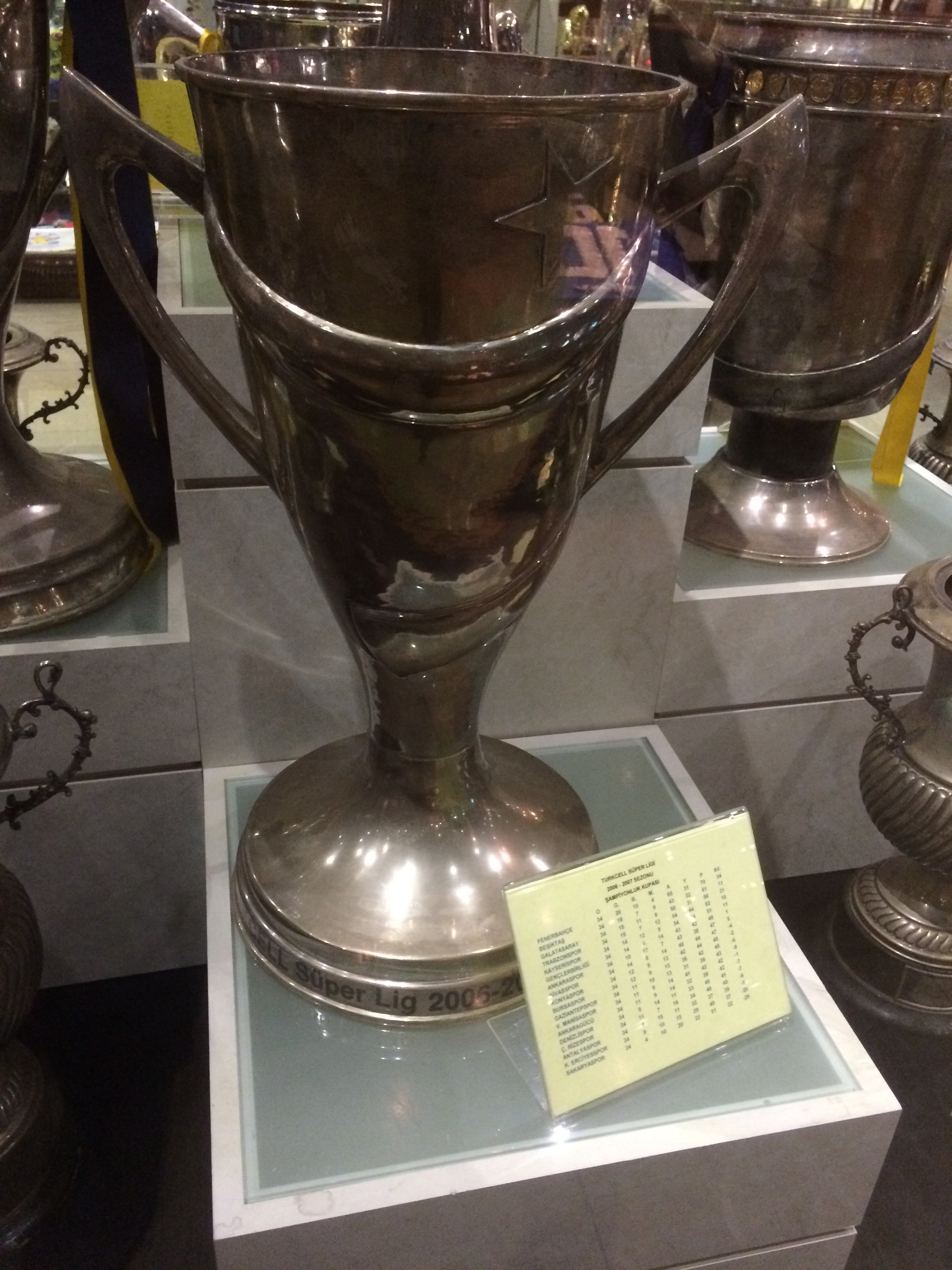
- 2006–07 Süper Lig trophy in the Fenerbahçe Museum
- Season: 2006–07
- Champions: Fenerbahçe; 17th title
- Relegated: Antalyaspor; Kayseri Erciyesspor; Sakaryaspor
- Champions League: Fenerbahçe; Beşiktaş
- UEFA Cup: Galatasaray; Kayseri Erciyesspor
- Intertoto Cup: Trabzonspor
- Matches: 306
- Goals: 736 (2.41 per match)
- Top goalscorer: Alex (19 goals)

Locations of the 18 Super League clubs in the 2006–2007 season, as green dots.

The 2006–07 Süper Lig was the 49th edition of the top-flight professional football league in Turkey. The season began on 4 August 2006 with a match between Ankaraspor and Galatasaray, resulting in a 1–1 draw. Fenerbahçe became champions after drawing Trabzonspor 2–2, while Beşiktaş lost 3–0 to Bursaspor and Galatasaray drew 1–1 with Sivasspor. Kayseri Erciyesspor gained qualification to the UEFA Cup because of Beşiktaş' qualification to the UEFA Champions League Second Qualifying Round.

Since Turkey dropped from 11th to 15th place in the UEFA association coefficient rankings at the end of the 2005–06 season, the cup winner (or the third-placed team if the domestic cup winner already qualified for UEFA Champions League) will not directly be entered into the first round of the UEFA Cup, but would begin in the second qualification round.

Fenerbahçe's winning points total of 70 points was a 13-year low.

== League table ==
| Pos | Team | Pld | W | D | L | GF | GA | GD | Pts | Qualification or relegation |
|---|---|---|---|---|---|---|---|---|---|---|
| 1 | Fenerbahçe (C) | 34 | 20 | 10 | 4 | 65 | 31 | +34 | 70 | Qualification to Champions League third qualifying round |
| 2 | Beşiktaş | 34 | 18 | 7 | 9 | 43 | 32 | +11 | 61 | Qualification to Champions League second qualifying round |
| 3 | Galatasaray | 34 | 15 | 11 | 8 | 58 | 37 | +21 | 56 | Qualification to UEFA Cup second qualifying round |
| 4 | Trabzonspor | 34 | 15 | 7 | 12 | 54 | 44 | +10 | 52 | Qualification to Intertoto Cup second round |
| 5 | Kayserispor | 34 | 13 | 12 | 9 | 54 | 43 | +11 | 51 | |
| 6 | Gençlerbirliği | 34 | 14 | 6 | 14 | 43 | 42 | +1 | 48 (Note: Gençlerbirliği were ahead of Sivasspor on head-to-head away goals scored: Gençlerbirliği–Sivasspor 0–1, Sivasspor–Gençlerbirliği 1–2.) | |
| 7 | Sivasspor | 34 | 14 | 6 | 14 | 41 | 44 | −3 | 48 | |
| 8 | Ankaraspor | 34 | 10 | 17 | 7 | 43 | 38 | +5 | 47 | |
| 9 | Konyaspor | 34 | 12 | 9 | 13 | 42 | 44 | −2 | 45 | |
| 10 | Bursaspor | 34 | 12 | 9 | 13 | 36 | 42 | −6 | 45 | |
| 11 | Gaziantepspor | 34 | 11 | 10 | 13 | 31 | 39 | −8 | 43 | |
| 12 | Manisaspor | 34 | 11 | 9 | 14 | 41 | 45 | −4 | 42 | |
| 13 | MKE Ankaragücü | 34 | 11 | 9 | 14 | 32 | 39 | −7 | 42 | |
| 14 | Denizlispor | 34 | 9 | 14 | 11 | 33 | 40 | −7 | 41 | |
| 15 | Çaykur Rizespor | 34 | 11 | 7 | 16 | 34 | 40 | −6 | 40 | |
| 16 | Antalyaspor (R) | 34 | 8 | 15 | 11 | 32 | 36 | −4 | 39 | Relegation to TFF First League |
| 17 | Kayseri Erciyesspor (R) | 34 | 9 | 10 | 15 | 29 | 49 | −20 | 37 | UEFA Cup qualifying and relegation to First League (Note: Winner of 2006–07 Turkish Cup, Beşiktaş, qualified for the Champions League, so the loser finalists Erciyesspor qualified for the 2007–08 UEFA Cup second qualifying round.) |
| 18 | Sakaryaspor (R) | 34 | 4 | 10 | 20 | 25 | 51 | −26 | 22 | Relegation to TFF First League |

Source: Süper Lig
Rules for classification: 1) points; 2) goal difference; 3) number of goals scored.
(C) Champions; (R) Relegated

== Results ==
| Home \ Away | ANG | ANK | ANT | BJK | BUR | ÇRZ | DEN | FEN | GSY | GAZ | GBR | KAY | KER | KON | SAK | SIV | TRB | VMN |
|---|---|---|---|---|---|---|---|---|---|---|---|---|---|---|---|---|---|---|
| Ankaragücü | | 1–1 | 1–0 | 0–1 | 1–1 | 2–0 | 0–0 | 0–1 | 1–2 | 2–1 | 0–0 | 0–4 | 4–1 | 2–0 | 1–0 | 1–4 | 2–2 | 0–1 |
| Ankaraspor | 1–0 | | 1–1 | 0–0 | 0–0 | 2–1 | 1–1 | 2–2 | 1–1 | 2–0 | 1–2 | 1–1 | 2–2 | 4–2 | 1–0 | 2–1 | 2–1 | 1–1 |
| Antalyaspor | 0–1 | 1–1 | | 4–4 | 3–2 | 0–0 | 1–1 | 1–0 | 0–1 | 0–0 | 1–3 | 1–0 | 3–1 | 1–0 | 1–0 | 1–2 | 1–2 | 1–0 |
| Beşiktaş | 2–1 | 2–1 | 1–0 | | 3–1 | 1–0 | 2–0 | 0–1 | 2–1 | 2–1 | 1–0 | 2–1 | 1–0 | 3–1 | 0–0 | 0–1 | 2–3 | 3–1 |
| Bursaspor | 0–0 | 0–0 | 0–0 | 3–0 | | 1–0 | 1–0 | 0–4 | 2–0 | 1–1 | 0–0 | 0–3 | 0–0 | 1–0 | 3–1 | 1–3 | 2–1 | 4–0 |
| Çaykur Rizespor | 3–1 | 1–1 | 1–0 | 0–1 | 1–2 | | 2–2 | 2–1 | 2–1 | 2–0 | 0–1 | 2–1 | 0–0 | 1–0 | 3–1 | 1–1 | 3–2 | 3–1 |
| Denizlispor | 1–0 | 1–1 | 1–1 | 0–2 | 0–0 | 2–0 | | 0–0 | 1–1 | 0–2 | 3–2 | 2–1 | 2–1 | 0–1 | 1–0 | 2–0 | 3–4 | 0–0 |
| Fenerbahçe | 3–1 | 2–1 | 4–2 | 0–0 | 0–1 | 2–1 | 2–2 | | 2–1 | 4–1 | 2–1 | 4–1 | 6–0 | 3–0 | 1–0 | 2–2 | 2–2 | 0–0 |
| Galatasaray | 1–1 | 2–0 | 1–1 | 1–0 | 3–1 | 3–1 | 1–1 | 1–2 | | 2–2 | 1–0 | 4–0 | 0–1 | 3–3 | 4–0 | 3–1 | 2–1 | 4–0 |
| Gaziantepspor | 2–2 | 0–2 | 0–0 | 0–0 | 1–2 | 1–0 | 1–1 | 0–2 | 1–0 | | 2–0 | 1–2 | 0–1 | 1–0 | 1–0 | 1–0 | 2–1 | 0–0 |
| Gençlerbirliği | 1–2 | 2–1 | 1–0 | 0–2 | 1–0 | 2–1 | 3–1 | 0–2 | 1–3 | 0–0 | | 2–2 | 1–2 | 4–1 | 1–0 | 0–1 | 3–0 | 0–5 |
| Kayserispor | 2–1 | 3–3 | 4–4 | 3–0 | 2–0 | 1–0 | 1–0 | 2–2 | 0–0 | 1–2 | 0–0 | | 1–0 | 2–1 | 2–0 | 1–1 | 1–0 | 2–2 |
| Kayseri Erciyesspor | 0–1 | 1–0 | 0–0 | 1–1 | 2–1 | 1–1 | 2–0 | 1–1 | 1–2 | 1–1 | 0–2 | 0–4 | | 1–2 | 2–0 | 0–0 | 0–1 | 1–0 |
| Konyaspor | 2–0 | 2–2 | 0–0 | 2–1 | 1–0 | 2–0 | 5–1 | 0–1 | 2–2 | 0–2 | 2–1 | 1–1 | 1–1 | | 1–1 | 2–0 | 1–2 | 1–0 |
| Sakaryaspor | 0–0 | 0–0 | 0–0 | 1–1 | 1–3 | 1–1 | 1–2 | 2–1 | 0–3 | 1–2 | 1–1 | 3–3 | 1–2 | 1–1 | | 1–3 | 1–0 | 0–1 |
| Sivasspor | 2–1 | 0–2 | 0–1 | 0–1 | 3–1 | 1–0 | 0–2 | 1–1 | 1–1 | 2–1 | 1–2 | 3–2 | 2–1 | 1–3 | 0–2 | | 1–0 | 3–2 |
| Trabzonspor | 0–1 | 3–0 | 0–0 | 3–2 | 3–1 | 0–1 | 1–0 | 1–2 | 3–1 | 2–0 | 4–3 | 0–0 | 3–1 | 1–1 | 5–2 | 2–0 | | 1–1 |
| Vestel Manisaspor | 0–1 | 1–3 | 3–2 | 1–0 | 4–1 | 2–0 | 0–0 | 2–3 | 2–2 | 4–1 | 0–3 | 1–0 | 5–1 | 0–1 | 0–3 (Note: On March 17, the Vestel Manisaspor–Sakaryaspor match was halted at the 40th minute with the score 1–1 due to fans getting out of control. Sakaryaspor were awarded a 3–0 win.) | 1–0 | 0–0 | |

Source: TFF
Legend: Blue = home team win; Yellow = draw; Red = away team win.

== Statistics ==
=== Top goalscorers ===
| Rank | Player | Club | Goals |
|---|---|---|---|
| 1 | (Brazil) Alex | Fenerbahçe | 19 |
| 2 | (Turkey) Ümit Karan | Galatasaray | 18 |
| 3 | (Turkey) Gökhan Ünal | Kayserispor | 16 |
| 4 | (Turkey) Umut Bulut | Trabzonspor | 15 |
| 5 | (Nigeria) Isaac Promise | Gençlerbirliği | 12 |
| 5 | (Brazil) Bobô | Beşiktaş | 12 |
| 7 | (Turkey) Okan Öztürk | Gençlerbirliği | 11 |
| 8 | (Turkey) Ersen Martin | Trabzonspor | 10 |
| 8 | (Serbia) Saša Ilić | Galatasaray | 10 |
| 8 | (Turkey) Coşkun Birdal | Antalyaspor | 10 |

=== Hat-tricks ===
| Player | For | Against | Result | Date |
|---|---|---|---|---|
| (Brazil) Alex | Fenerbahçe | Kayseri Erciyesspor | 6–0 | 5 August 2006 |
| (Czech Republic) Lukas Zelenka | Manisaspor | Kayseri Erciyesspor | 5–1 | 10 September 2006 |
| (Brazil) Rafael Marques | Manisaspor | Gençlerbirliği | 5–0 | 15 September 2006 |
| (Brazil) Deivid | Fenerbahçe | Manisaspor | 3–2 | 29 October 2006 |
| (Brazil) Bobô | Beşiktaş | Antalyaspor | 4–4 | 5 November 2006 |
| (Turkey) Coşkun Birdal | Antalyaspor | Beşiktaş | 4–4 | 5 November 2006 |
| (Brazil) Marcio Nobre | Beşiktaş | Manisaspor | 3–1 | 28 January 2007 |
| (Turkey) Ümit Karan | Galatasaray | Manisaspor | 4–0 | 11 February 2007 |
| (Turkey) Umut Bulut | Trabzonspor | Denizlispor | 4–3 | 18 February 2007 |
| (Argentina) Franco Cángele | Sakaryaspor | Kayserispor | 3–3 | 9 March 2007 |
| (Turkey) Coşkun Birdal | Antalyaspor | Kayserispor | 4–4 | 17 March 2007 |
| (Brazil) Jabá | Ankaraspor | Konyaspor | 4–2 | 15 April 2007 |
| (Slovakia) Filip Hološko | Manisaspor | Bursaspor | 4–1 | 22 April 2007 |

== Stadiums ==
| Team | Stadium | Capacity |
|---|---|---|
| Fenerbahçe | Şükrü Saracoğlu Stadium | 50,509 |
| Beşiktaş | BJK İnönü Stadium | 32,086 |
| Kayserispor | Kayseri Atatürk Stadyumu | 25,918 |
| Erciyesspor | Kayseri Atatürk Stadyumu | 25,918 |
| Galatasaray | Ali Sami Yen Stadium | 23,785 |
| Konyaspor | Konya Atatürk Stadium | 22,459 |
| Trabzonspor | Huseyin Avni Aker Stadium | 19,649 |
| Ankaragücü | Ankara 19 Mayis Stadium | 19,209 |
| Ankaraspor | Ankara 19 Mayis Stadium | 19,209 |
| Gençlerbirliği | Ankara 19 Mayis Stadium | 19,209 |
| Bursaspor | Bursa Atatürk Stadyumu | 18,587 |
| Denizlispor | Atatürk Stadyumu (Denizli) | 15,459 |
| Gaziantepspor | Kamil Ocak Stadyumu | 14,325 |
| Sakaryaspor | Sakarya Atatürk Stadyumu | 13,396 |
| Sivasspor | 4 Eylül Stadı | 11,500 |
| Antalyaspor | Antalya Atatürk Stadium | 11,137 |
| Rizespor | Rize Atatürk Stadium | 10,459 |
| Manisaspor | Manisa 19 Mayis Stadi | 10,025 |

== Teams promoted/relegated ==
The teams promoted from the TFF First League in 2005–06 season:

- Bursaspor (1st)
- Antalyaspor (2nd)
- Sakaryaspor (Play-off winner)

The teams relegated to the TFF First League in 2005–06 season:

- Diyarbakırspor (18th)
- Samsunspor (17th)
- Malatyaspor (16th)

== Foreign players ==
| Club | Player 1 | Player 2 | Player 3 | Player 4 | Player 5 | Player 6 | Player 7 | Former Players |
|---|---|---|---|---|---|---|---|---|
| Ankaragücü | (Brazil) André Silva | (Brazil) Tita | (Bulgaria) Aleksandar Aleksandrov | (Bulgaria) Ivaylo Petkov | (Ghana) Augustine Ahinful | (Nigeria) Victor Agali | | (Brazil) Robson (Croatia) Srebrenko Posavec |
| Ankaraspor | (Brazil) Jabá | (Brazil) Wederson | (Czech Republic) Adam Petrouš | (Hungary) Illés Zsolt Sitku | (Montenegro) Ardian Đokaj | (Montenegro) Radoslav Batak | (Togo) Hamílton | |
| Antalyaspor | (Colombia) Óscar Córdoba | (Honduras) Maynor Suazo | (Poland) Jarosław Bieniuk | (Poland) Piotr Dziewicki | (Slovakia) Pavol Straka | (Tunisia) Ali Zitouni | | |
| Beşiktaş | (Argentina) Matías Delgado | (Brazil) Bobô | (Brazil) Kléberson | (Brazil) Ricardinho | (Croatia) Vedran Runje | | | |
| Bursaspor | (Brazil) Mateus Paraná | (North Macedonia) Veliče Šumulikoski | (Romania) Cornel Frăsineanu | (Romania) Daniel Pancu | | | | |
| Çaykur Rizespor | (Brazil) Anderson | (Bulgaria) Zdravko Zdravkov | (Colombia) Gustavo Victoria | (Egypt) Besheer El-Tabei | (Egypt) Ibrahim Said | (Namibia) Razundara Tjikuzu | (Senegal) Pape Ciré Dia | (Slovenia) Dragan Jelić |
| Denizlispor | (Brazil) Adriano | (Brazil) Alessandro Cambalhota | (Brazil) Júlio César | (Cameroon) Souleymanou Hamidou | (Czech Republic) Karel Kroupa | (Czech Republic) Tomáš Abrahám | (Slovakia) Roman Kratochvíl | (Brazil) Valmir |
| Fenerbahçe | (Brazil) Alex | (Brazil) Deivid | (Brazil) Edu Dracena | (Ghana) Stephen Appiah | (Serbia) Mateja Kežman | (Uruguay) Diego Lugano | | |
| Galatasaray | (Argentina) Marcelo Carrusca | (Cameroon) Rigobert Song | (Colombia) Faryd Mondragón | (Croatia) Stjepan Tomas | (Japan) Junichi Inamoto | (Serbia) Saša Ilić | | |
| Gaziantepspor | (Argentina) Christian Zurita | (Bosnia and Herzegovina) Kenan Hasagić | (France) Kodjo Afanou | (Guinea) Kaba Diawara | (Mexico) Antonio de Nigris | (Romania) Giani Kiriță | (Serbia) Nikola Jozić | (Serbia) Nikola Drinčić |
| Gençlerbirliği | (Brazil) Sandro | (Brazil) Tozo | (Burkina Faso) Lamine Traoré | (Ghana) Haminu Draman | (Nigeria) Isaac Promise | | | (France) Michaël Niçoise (Sweden) Fredrik Risp |
| Kayserispor | (Argentina) Leonardo Iglesias | (Brazil) Éder Prudêncio | (Bulgaria) Dimitar Ivankov | (Ghana) Samuel Johnson | (Paraguay) Delio Toledo | (Uruguay) Marcelo Méndez | | (Azerbaijan) Rashad Sadygov (Iran) Hamed Kavianpour (Slovenia) Danilo Saveljič |
| Kayseri Erciyesspor | (Bulgaria) Zdravko Lazarov | (Guinea) Daouda Jabi | (Hungary) Balázs Tóth | (Ivory Coast) Serge Dié | (Montenegro) Radomir Đalović | (Tunisia) Khaled Fadhel | (Tunisia) Riadh Bouazizi | (Nigeria) Victor Agali |
| Konyaspor | (Brazil) Éder Ceccon | (Brazil) Kauê | (Egypt) Mohamed Abdullah | (France) Cédric Sabin | (Portugal) Neca | | | (Bulgaria) Aleksandar Aleksandrov (Egypt) Ahmad Belal |
| Sakaryaspor | (Argentina) Alejandro Capurro | (Argentina) Claudio Graf | (Argentina) Franco Cángele | (Colombia) Neco Martínez | (Germany) Dominik Werling | (Ghana) 'Baba Adamu | | (Democratic Republic of the Congo) Marcel Mbayo (Tunisia) José Clayton |
| Sivasspor | (Australia) Michael Petkovic | (Australia) Simon Colosimo | (Brazil) Fransérgio | (Bulgaria) Ivan Tsvetkov | (Nigeria) Bernard Okorowanta | (Netherlands) Nordin Wooter | | (Brazil) Anderson (Brazil) Fabrício |
| Trabzonspor | (Brazil) Jefferson | (Netherlands) Kiki Musampa | (Serbia) Milan Stepanov | (Sweden) Fredrik Risp | | | | (Brazil) Marcelinho (Poland) Mirosław Szymkowiak |
| Vestel Manisaspor | (Brazil) Rafael Marques | (Brazil) Reinaldo | (Czech Republic) Lukáš Zelenka | (Czech Republic) Michal Meduna | (France) Stéphane Borbiconi | (Guinea) Oumar Kalabane | (Slovakia) Filip Hološko | (Czech Republic) Petr Johana |
