= 2009 J.League Division 1 =

17th season of J1 League

J.League Division 1
- Season: 2009
- Champions: Kashima Antlers; 7th J.League title 7th Japanese title
- Relegated: Kashiwa Reysol; JEF United Chiba; Oita Trinita
- Champions League: Kashima Antlers; Kawasaki Frontale; Gamba Osaka; Sanfrecce Hiroshima (all to the group stage)
- Matches: 306
- Goals: 791 (2.58 per match)
- Top goalscorer: Ryoichi Maeda (20 goals)
- Highest attendance: 53,783 (Round 34, Reds vs. Antlers)
- Lowest attendance: 5,567 (Round 12, Sanga vs. JEF United)
- Average attendance: 18,985

The 2009 J.League Division 1 season was the 45th season of the top-flight club football in Japan and the 17th season since the establishment of J.League Division 1. The season started on March 7 and ended on December, 5.

A total of eighteen clubs participated in double round-robin format. At the end of the season, top three clubs received automatic qualification to the following years' AFC Champions League. Also starting this season, the bottom three clubs were relegated to J.League Division 2 by default.

Kashima Antlers became the first Japanese club win J.League Division 1 in three straight seasons.

== Clubs ==
Location of the clubs in Japan

The following eighteen clubs participated in J.League Division 1 during the 2009 season. Of these clubs, Sanfrecce Hiroshima and Montedio Yamagata were newly promoted clubs.

Club name	Home town(s)	Note(s)
Albirex Niigata	Niigata & Seirō, Niigata	
FC Tokyo	Tokyo	
Gamba Osaka	Suita, Osaka	2009 ACL participant
JEF United Chiba	Chiba & Ichihara, Chiba	
Júbilo Iwata	Iwata, Shizuoka	
Kashima Antlers	Southwestern cities/towns of Ibaraki	2009 ACL participant Two-time defending champions
Kashiwa Reysol	Kashiwa, Chiba	
Kawasaki Frontale	Kawasaki, Kanagawa	2009 ACL participant
Kyoto Sanga	Southwestern cities/town in Kyoto	
Montedio Yamagata	All cities/towns in Yamagata	Promoted from J2 League in 2008
Nagoya Grampus	Nagoya, Aichi	2009 ACL participant
Oita Trinita	All cities/towns in Ōita	
Omiya Ardija	Saitama	
Sanfrecce Hiroshima	Hiroshima	Promoted from J2 League in 2008
Shimizu S-Pulse	Shizuoka	
Urawa Red Diamonds	Saitama	
Vissel Kobe	Kobe, Hyōgo	
Yokohama F. Marinos	Yokohama & Yokosuka	

=== Personnel ===
Club	Head coach	Kit manufacturer	Shirt sponsor
Albirex Niigata	(Japan) Jun Suzuki	Adidas	Kameda Seika
FC Tokyo	(Japan) Hiroshi Jofuku	Adidas	Eneos
Gamba Osaka	(Japan) Akira Nishino	Umbro	Panasonic
JEF United Chiba	(Japan) Atsuhiko Ejiri	Kappa	Fuji Electric
Júbilo Iwata	(Japan) Masaaki Yanagishita	Puma	Yamaha
Kashima Antlers	(Brazil) Oswaldo de Oliveira	Nike	Tostem
Kashiwa Reysol	(Brazil) Nelsinho Baptista	Umbro	Hitachi
Kawasaki Frontale	(Japan) Takashi Sekizuka	Asics	Fujitsu
Kyoto Purple Sanga	(Japan) Hisashi Kato	CW-X	Kyocera
Montedio Yamagata	(Japan) Shinji Kobayashi	Puma	Tsuyahime
Nagoya Grampus	(Serbia) Dragan Stojković	Le Coq Sportif	Toyota
Oita Trinita	(Serbia) Ranko Popović	Puma	None
Omiya Ardija	(South Korea) Chang Woe-ryong	Under Armour	NTT Docomo
Sanfrecce Hiroshima	(Serbia) Mihailo Petrović	Mizuno	Deodeo
Shimizu S-Pulse	(Japan) Kenta Hasegawa	Puma	Suzuyo
Urawa Red Diamonds	(Germany) Volker Finke	Nike	SAVAS
Vissel Kobe	(Japan) Toshiya Miura	Asics	Rakuten
Yokohama F. Marinos	(Japan) Kokichi Kimura	Nike	Nissan

=== Foreign players ===
Club	Player 1	Player 2	Player 3	AFC player	Non-visa foreign	Type-C contract	Former players
Albirex Niigata	(Brazil) Éverton Santos	(Brazil) Gilton	(Brazil) Márcio Richardes	(South Korea) Cho Young-cheol			(Brazil) Bruno Suzuki (Brazil) Pedro Júnior
FC Tokyo	(Brazil) Bruno Quadros						(Brazil) Caboré
Gamba Osaka	(Brazil) Lucas Severino	(Brazil) Pedro Júnior		(South Korea) Cho Jae-jin			(Brazil) Leandro (South Korea) Park Dong-hyuk
JEF United Chiba	(Brazil) Alex	(Brazil) Michael	(Brazil) Neto Baiano	(Australia) Eddy Bosnar			
Júbilo Iwata	(Brazil) Gilsinho			(South Korea) Lee Keun-ho			(Brazil) Ferrugem
Kashima Antlers	(Brazil) Danilo	(Brazil) Marquinhos		(South Korea) Park Joo-ho			
Kashiwa Reysol	(Brazil) Anselmo Ramon	(Brazil) França	(Brazil) Popó	(South Korea) Park Dong-hyuk		(Nigeria) Adebayo Adigun	(Brazil) Alceu
Kawasaki Frontale	(Brazil) Juninho	(Brazil) Renatinho	(Brazil) Vitor Júnior		(North Korea) Jong Tae-se		
Kyoto Sanga	(Brazil) Diego Souza	(Brazil) Sidiclei		(South Korea) Lee Jung-soo	(North Korea) Kim Song-yong		(Brazil) Paulinho
Montedio Yamagata	(Brazil) Jajá	(Brazil) Léo San		(South Korea) Kim Byung-suk		(Brazil) Fagner	(Brazil) André Silva
Nagoya Grampus	(Brazil) Magnum	(Montenegro) Igor Burzanović	(Serbia) Miloš Bajalica	(Australia) Joshua Kennedy			(Brazil) Davi
Oita Trinita	(Brazil) Edmilson Alves	(Brazil) Fernandinho	(Brazil) Ueslei			(South Korea) Choi Jung-han	(Brazil) Roberto
Omiya Ardija	(Brazil) Dudu	(Brazil) Rafael Marques	(Croatia) Mato Neretljak	(South Korea) Park Won-jae		(South Korea) Seo Yong-duk	(Brazil) Dênis Marques (Slovenia) Klemen Lavrič
Sanfrecce Hiroshima	(Bulgaria) Ilian Stoyanov	(Croatia) Mihael Mikić			(North Korea) Ri Han-jae		
Shimizu S-Pulse	(Brazil) Marcos Paulo	(Norway) Frode Johnsen					(South Korea) Kim Dong-sub
Urawa Red Diamonds	(Brazil) Edmílson	(Brazil) Robson Ponte				(Ghana) Mohammed Faisal	
Vissel Kobe	(Brazil) Alan Bahia	(Brazil) Marcel	(Brazil) Raphael Botti	(South Korea) Kim Nam-il	(South Korea) Park Kang-jo		
Yokohama F. Marinos				(South Korea) Kim Kun-hoan		(South Korea) Jeong Dong-ho	

== League format ==
Eighteen clubs will play in double round-robin (home and away) format, a total of 34 games each. A club receives 3 points for a win, 1 point for a tie, and 0 points for a loss. The clubs are ranked by points, and tie breakers are, in the following order:

- Goal differential
- Goals scored
- Head-to-head results
- Disciplinary points

A draw would be conducted, if necessary. However, if two clubs are tied at the first place, both clubs will be declared as the champions. The bottom three clubs will be relegated to J2 League. The top three clubs will qualify to AFC Champions League in the following year.

Changes from previous year

- Bottom three clubs are relegated by default; during 2004–2008 season, the 16th-place club needed to win playoffs to avoid relegation.
- The fourth foreign player slot (AFC player slot) is introduced.

== League table ==
Pos	Team	Pld	W	D	L	GF	GA	GD	Pts	Qualification or relegation
1	Kashima Antlers (C)	34	20	6	8	51	30	+21	66	Qualification for 2010 AFC Champions League group stage (Note: Sanfrecce Hiroshima received fourth Japanese berth in the group stage of the 2010 AFC Champions League because Gamba Osaka, the winners of the 2009 Emperor's Cup, had been already qualified for ACL through J.League championship.)
2	Kawasaki Frontale	34	19	7	8	64	40	+24	64	Qualification for 2010 AFC Champions League group stage
3	Gamba Osaka	34	18	6	10	62	44	+18	60	Qualification for 2010 AFC Champions League group stage
4	Sanfrecce Hiroshima	34	15	11	8	53	44	+9	56	Qualification for 2010 AFC Champions League group stage
5	FC Tokyo	34	16	5	13	47	39	+8	53	
6	Urawa Red Diamonds	34	16	4	14	43	43	0	52	
7	Shimizu S-Pulse	34	13	12	9	44	41	+3	51	
8	Albirex Niigata	34	13	11	10	42	31	+11	50	
9	Nagoya Grampus	34	14	8	12	46	42	+4	50	
10	Yokohama F. Marinos	34	11	13	10	43	37	+6	46	
11	Júbilo Iwata	34	11	8	15	50	60	−10	41	
12	Kyoto Sanga	34	11	8	15	35	47	−12	41	
13	Omiya Ardija	34	9	12	13	40	47	−7	39	
14	Vissel Kobe	34	10	9	15	40	48	−8	39	
15	Montedio Yamagata	34	10	9	15	32	40	−8	39	
16	Kashiwa Reysol (R)	34	7	13	14	41	57	−16	34	Relegation to 2010 J.League Division 2
17	Oita Trinita (R)	34	8	6	20	26	45	−19	30	Relegation to 2010 J.League Division 2
18	JEF United Chiba (R)	34	5	12	17	32	56	−24	27	Relegation to 2010 J.League Division 2

Updated to match(es) played on December 5, 2009. Source: J.League Division 1
Rules for classification: 1) points; 2) goal difference; 3) number of goals scored.
(C) Champions; (R) Relegated

== Results ==
Home \ Away	ALB	ANT	ARD	FRO	GAM	GRA	JEF	JÚB	MON	REY	SFR	SAN	SSP	TOK	TRI	RED	VIS	FMA
Albirex Niigata		2–1	0–0	2–2	1–2	2–1	2–2	3–3	1–1	0–1	3–3	1–2	0–1	1–1	0–0	0–1	2–0	2–1
Kashima Antlers	0–1		2–0	2–3 (Note: The Kashima Antlers-hosted game against Kawasaki Frontale on the 25th week was halted at 74th minute due to the pitch condition caused by heavy rain, the score at the moment was 1–3 (Marquinhos 30' – Jong Tae-se 19', 32', Juninho 66'). The game resumed on October 7 from the 74th minute. (Iwamasa 74'))	5–1	1–4	3–0	1–0	2–0	1–1	2–1	2–1	2–1	3–1	1–0	2–0	1–0	0–0
Omiya Ardija	0–1	3–1		2–3	3–2	0–2	1–1	1–1	0–3	1–1	0–1	2–1	0–0	0–3	3–0	1–1	1–1	0–0
Kawasaki Frontale	1–0	1–1	3–1		1–0	3–1	3–2	2–0	2–0	1–1	7–0	4–1	1–1	2–1	2–0	0–2	2–2	2–0
Gamba Osaka	0–2	0–1	4–1	2–1		2–3	2–0	4–1	2–1	4–0	2–2	4–1	1–4	4–2	1–0	1–0	3–2	0–0
Nagoya Grampus	1–0	0–3	1–1	0–2	2–1		0–1	3–3	2–0	2–3	0–0	1–1	3–1	1–2	3–2	0–1	1–0	2–1
JEF United Chiba	0–1	0–2	0–2	1–1	0–3	0–2		1–1	1–2	0–0	2–1	1–1	1–2	2–1	0–2	0–1	1–1	1–1
Júbilo Iwata	0–2	0–0	3–1	2–1	1–3	2–1	3–2		2–6	2–3	0–1	3–0	3–0	0–1	3–1	1–1	1–0	1–1
Montedio Yamagata	0–1	1–1	0–0	0–1	1–1	0–0	1–0	3–1		0–0	1–2	0–0	0–1	1–0	0–0	2–3	1–0	0–0
Kashiwa Reysol	0–4	1–2	2–2	2–3	0–2	1–2	1–1	1–2	0–1		1–2	0–0	5–0	0–3	2–1	2–3	0–1	1–1
Sanfrecce Hiroshima	1–2	1–0	2–3	1–1	2–2	0–0	4–1	0–1	3–1	4–1		4–1	0–0	2–0	1–0	2–1	4–3	3–2
Kyoto Sanga	1–0	0–1	1–3	3–1	2–1	0–1	2–1	2–3	1–0	1–2	2–0		0–1	2–1	1–1	1–0	1–0	2–0
Shimizu S-Pulse	1–1	2–2	1–0	1–0	0–2	0–0	2–2	5–1	4–1	1–1	1–1	3–3		1–2	3–1	2–2	1–0	0–0
FC Tokyo	1–4	1–2	3–2	2–3	0–0	3–0	1–2	3–2	1–0	4–0	0–0	0–0	2–1		2–0	0–1	1–0	0–0
Oita Trinita	0–0	1–2	1–1	1–0	1–3	2–1	1–2	2–1	0–1	0–0	0–1	1–0	2–1	0–1		1–0	0–2	1–2
Urawa Red Diamonds	1–0	0–1	0–3	2–3	0–0	0–3	3–1	3–2	4–1	1–4	2–1	1–0	0–1	3–1	1–0		2–0	1–2
Vissel Kobe	1–0	1–0	1–2	3–1	3–1	2–2	2–2	1–1	3–1	3–1	0–0	1–1	0–1	0–2	3–2	3–2		2–2
Yokohama F. Marinos	1–1	2–1	1–0	2–1	1–2	2–1	1–1	1–0	1–2	3–3	2–4	3–0	2–0	0–1	1–2	2–0	5–0	

Updated to match(es) played on December 5, 2009. Source: J. League Division 1
Legend: Blue = home team win; Yellow = draw; Red = away team win.

== Top scorers ==
Rank	Scorer	Club	Goals
1	(Japan) Ryoichi Maeda	Júbilo Iwata	20
2	(Brazil) Edmílson	Urawa Red Diamonds	17
2	(Brazil) Juninho	Kawasaki Frontale	17
4	(Japan) Hisato Satō	Sanfrecce Hiroshima	15
4	(Japan) Naohiro Ishikawa	FC Tokyo	15
6	(Japan) Shinji Okazaki	Shimizu S-Pulse	14
6	(North Korea) Jong Tae-se	Kawasaki Frontale	14
8	(Brazil) Marquinhos	Kashima Antlers	13
8	(Brazil) Pedro Júnior	Gamba Osaka (Note: Transferred from Albirex Niigata after 24th week)	13
8	(Japan) Kazuma Watanabe	Yokohama F. Marinos	13

== Attendances ==
Pos	Team	Total	High	Low	Average	Change
1	Urawa Red Diamonds	751,565	53,783	18,777	44,210	−7.1%
2	Albirex Niigata	568,582	40,268	24,392	33,446	−3.0%
3	FC Tokyo	440,032	40,701	18,221	25,884	+0.7%
4	Yokohama F. Marinos	374,975	40,228	11,025	22,057	−6.9%
5	Kashima Antlers	367,486	37,878	14,473	21,617	+9.7%
6	Kawasaki Frontale	320,394	22,390	14,696	18,847	+7.3%
7	Oita Trinita	313,281	24,833	14,163	18,428	−9.3%
8	Shimizu S-Pulse	304,900	30,851	9,756	17,935	+8.0%
9	Gamba Osaka	301,105	20,394	10,159	17,712	+9.8%
10	Nagoya Grampus	270,773	32,435	9,355	15,928	−3.8%
11	Sanfrecce Hiroshima	267,299	27,113	9,479	15,723	+45.0%^{†}
12	JEF United Chiba	250,413	17,916	12,349	14,730	+4.6%
13	Omiya Ardija	233,013	37,842	7,796	13,707	+46.6%
14	Júbilo Iwata	229,891	22,152	8,716	13,523	−12.6%
15	Vissel Kobe	222,153	20,721	6,002	13,068	+0.7%
16	Montedio Yamagata	204,953	20,102	6,554	12,056	+92.2%^{†}
17	Kashiwa Reysol	199,552	32,854	8,124	11,738	−4.6%
18	Kyoto Sanga	189,149	18,121	5,567	11,126	−18.7%
	League total	5,809,516	53,783	5,567	18,985	−1.1%

Updated to games played on December 5, 2009
Source: J. League Division 1
Notes:
^{†} Team played previous season in J2.

== Awards ==
=== Individual awards ===
Award	Recipient	Club
Most Valuable Player	(Japan) Mitsuo Ogasawara	Kashima Antlers
Rookie of the Year	(Japan) Kazuma Watanabe	Yokohama F. Marinos
Manager of the Year	(Brazil) Oswaldo de Oliveira	Kashima Antlers
Top Scorer	(Japan) Ryoichi Maeda	Júbilo Iwata

=== Best eleven ===
Pos	Footballer	Club	Nationality
GK	Eiji Kawashima	Kawasaki Frontale	Japan
DF	Atsuto Uchida	Kashima Antlers	Japan
DF	Daiki Iwamasa	Kashima Antlers	Japan
DF	Marcus Tulio Tanaka	Nagoya Grampus	Japan
DF	Yuto Nagatomo	FC Tokyo	Japan
MF	Kengo Nakamura	Kawasaki Frontale	Japan
MF	Mitsuo Ogasawara	Kashima Antlers	Japan
MF	Naohiro Ishikawa	FC Tokyo	Japan
MF	Yasuhito Endō	Gamba Osaka	Japan
FW	Ryoichi Maeda	Júbilo Iwata	Japan
FW	Shinji Okazaki	Shimizu S-Pulse	Japan
