= Birdal =

Birdal is a Turkish surname. Notable people with the surname include:

- Akın Birdal (born 1948), Turkish politician
- Coşkun Birdal (born 1973), Turkish footballer
