= Marcos (footballer, born 1973) =

Brazilian footballer

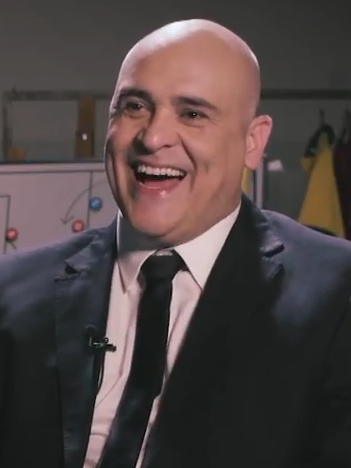
- Marcos in 2018

Personal information
- Full name: Marcos Roberto Silveira dos Reis
- Date of birth: 4 August 1973 (age 53)
- Place of birth: Oriente, São Paulo, Brazil
- Height: 1.93 m (6 ft 4 in)
- Position: Goalkeeper

Youth career
- 1990–1992: Lençoense
- 1992: Palmeiras

Senior career*
Years	Team	Apps	(Gls)
1992–2012	Palmeiras	533	(0)

International career
1992–1993	Brazil U20	4	(0)
1999–2005	Brazil	29	(0)
Medal record
Men's Football
Representing Brazil
FIFA World Cup
Winner	2002 Korea/Japan
Copa América
Winner	1999 Paraguay
FIFA Confederations Cup
Winner	2005 Germany
Runner-up	1999 Mexico
- * Club domestic league appearances and goals

Marcos Roberto Silveira dos Reis (born 4 August 1973), known as Marcos, is a Brazilian former professional footballer who played as a goalkeeper. He was the starting goalkeeper of the 2002 FIFA World Cup-winning Brazilian squad and is regarded by pundits as one of the greatest Brazilian goalkeepers of all time.

Marcos spent his entire professional career at Palmeiras in the Série A (and briefly in Série B) from 1992 until his retirement in January 2012, and became one of the club's greatest idols, being nicknamed São Marcos ("Saint Mark" in Portuguese).

== Club career ==
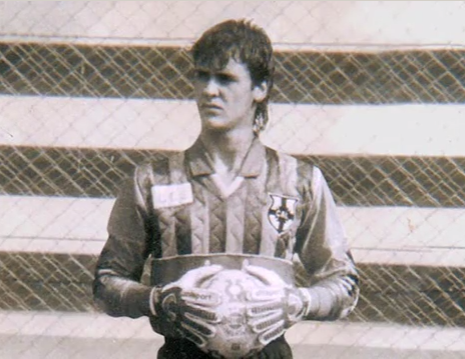
Marcos during his youth career at Lençoense

He played for Palmeiras since 1992 and was the first goalkeeper since 1999 after an injury of Velloso, the first-choice goalkeeper at the time. With outstanding performances in the 1999 Copa Libertadores he helped the team conquer the title, after beating Palmeiras' arch rivals Corinthians in the penalty shoot-outs in the quarter-final. Since then he was nicknamed São Marcos. In 2000 once again he faced Corinthians in the Libertadores, this time at the semi-final level, and again eliminated the rivals in the penalty shoot-out.

"I had the offer, travelled to London, but Palmeiras were going through a tough time in their history, after relegation, and I couldn't play some of the matches due to injury. I had the opportunity to join Arsenal, but this was also a chance for me to show the Palmeiras supporters that what I said about loving the club was true. I didn't want to do what many players do: sign a long contract (with Arsenal) – mine was supposed to be five years – and then tell the club I couldn’t adapt, ask to be loaned out, and still earn the club's money. I don't think it's a nice thing to do. That's why I spoke openly with Arsène Wenger."

— Marcos on why he chose not to join Arsenal in 2002.

In 2002, after a fantastic World Cup participation with Brazil's team, he received a proposal from the English team Arsenal and actually went to London to sign but then disappeared, leaving Arsenal midfielder and fellow Brazilian, Edu, wondering where he had gone, therefore the deal never happened. When he eventually surfaced, he stated that he would rather play the Campeonato Brasileiro Série B (second division) with Palmeiras than play in any European team just for the money.

In 2008, he helped Palmeiras win the 2008 Campeonato Paulista. Marcos played his 400th match for Palmeiras on 21 September 2008 in a Campeonato Brasileiro Série A match between his club and Vasco.

He was given a special shirt for playing his 400th match. The number 400 was printed on the back, with his name and the writings "O melhor goleiro do Brasil" (The best goalkeeper in Brazil). On the front, all the titles that he has won along with Palmeiras and Brazil's national team are printed.

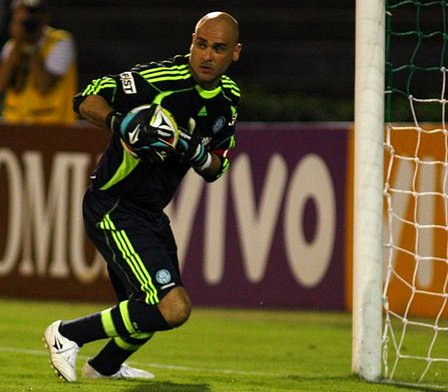
Marcos playing for Palmeiras in 2010

On 4 January 2012, at the age of 38, Marcos announced his retirement from football, due to his advanced age and the many injuries that marked his career.

After spending his entire 21-year pro career with Palmeiras, Marcos is widely considered one of the team's best players of all-time, alongside Ademir da Guia and Djalma Santos.

== International career ==
Marcos debuted for Brazil in a match against Spain on 13 November 1999. Previously, he was included in Brazil's squad for the 1999 Copa América and the 1999 FIFA Confederations Cup as a second-choice goalkeeper. He remained as Brazil's backup goalkeeper as Dida and Rogério Ceni were preferred ahead of him. He became Brazil's starting goalkeeper in the 2001 Copa América and retained that position after the tournament, relegating Dida to the bench.

He was subsequently included in Brazil's squad for the 2002 FIFA World Cup as the first-choice goalkeeper, replacing Cláudio Taffarel. He started every game in the tournament and played every minute of Brazil's matches in the tournament. He had four clean sheets, conceded only four goals in seven matches, and helped Brazil win the World Cup for a record fifth time. Simon Kuper and Stefan Szymanski reported in their book Soccernomics that Marcos spent the entire tournament in severe pain from a prior broken wrist injury that did not properly heal, unable to train fully or even catch the ball in some matches. According to Marcos' agent, Marcos hid the injury from manager Luiz Felipe Scolari through the tournament.

However, after a series of injuries that affected his career, Marcos lost his place in the team after the World Cup. He made only four more international appearances after the World Cup, and was left out of Brazil's squad for the 2003 FIFA Confederations Cup and the 2004 Copa América. In 2005, he was called again and included in the squad for the 2005 FIFA Confederations Cup. He made one appearance in the tournament, starting in a 2–2 draw against Japan during the group stage, which turned out to be his last appearance for Brazil.

On 6 October 2005, Marcos announced his retirement from international football, but continued to play for Palmeiras, the only team he has played for in his career.

However, he would later go back on his decision to retire from the national team, and announced himself as still available for selection. He was placed on standby lists for the 2006 FIFA World Cup and the 2007 Copa América, but did not manage to get a place in the final list of either competitions.

== Style of play ==
While writing for Sports Illustrated in 2009, Tim Vickery described Marcos with the following words: "Tall, athletic, commanding, good under pressure," while also praising him for his longevity. Nicknamed São Marcos ("Saint Mark" in Portuguese), he was also known for his penalty–stopping abilities, and is regarded by pundits as one of the greatest Brazilian goalkeepers of all time.

== Career statistics ==
=== Club ===
Appearances and goals by club, season and competition
Club	Season	League			Brazilian Cup		Paulista League		South America		International		Total	
Club	Season	Division	Apps	Goals	Apps	Goals	Apps	Goals	Apps	Goals	Apps	Goals	Apps	Goals
Palmeiras	1992	Série A	0	0	0	0	1	0	0	0	-	-	1	0
Palmeiras	1993	Série A	0	0	0	0	0	0	0	0	-	-	0	0
Palmeiras	1994	Série A	0	0	0	0	0	0	0	0	-	-	0	0
Palmeiras	1995	Série A	0	0	0	0	0	0	0	0	-	-	0	0
Palmeiras	1996	Série A	12	0	1	0	4	0	-	-	-	-	17	0
Palmeiras	1997	Série A	5	0	0	0	6	0	-	-	-	-	11	0
Palmeiras	1998	Série A	1	0	5	0	5	0	-	-	-	-	11	0
Palmeiras	1999	Série A	15	0	7	0	22	0	14	0	1	0	59	0
Palmeiras	2000	Série A	20	0	0	0	5	0	14	0	-	-	39	0
Palmeiras	2001	Série A	14	0	4	0	9	0	12	0	-	-	39	0
Palmeiras	2002	Série A	19	0	2	0	20	0	-	-	-	-	41	0
Palmeiras	2003	Série B	32	0	2	0	12	0	-	-	-	-	46	0
Palmeiras	2004	Série A	5	0	5	0	9	0	-	-	-	-	19	0
Palmeiras	2005	Série A	22	0	-	-	11	0	8	0	-	-	41	0
Palmeiras	2006	Série A	4	0	-	-	5	0	5	0	-	-	14	0
Palmeiras	2007	Série A	1	0	2	0	11	0	-	-	-	-	14	0
Palmeiras	2008	Série A	37	0	4	0	13	0	6	0	-	-	60	0
Palmeiras	2009	Série A	36	0	-	-	7	0	12	0	-	-	55	0
Palmeiras	2010	Série A	13	0	5	0	17	0	1	0	-	-	36	0
Palmeiras	2011	Série A	19	0	3	0	3	0	2	0	0	0	27	0
Career total			255	0	40	0	160	0	74	0	1	0	533	0

=== International ===
Appearances and goals by national team and year
National team	Year	Apps	Goals
Brazil	1999	1	0
Brazil	2000	0	0
Brazil	2001	11	0
Brazil	2002	13	0
Brazil	2003	1	0
Brazil	2004	1	0
Brazil	2005	2	0
Total		29	0

== Honours ==
Palmeiras

- Campeonato Brasileiro Série A: 1993, 1994
- Campeonato Brasileiro Série B: 2003
- Campeonato Paulista: 1993, 1994, 1996, 2008
- Copa do Brasil: 1998
- Copa Libertadores: 1999; runner-up: 2000
- Copa Mercosur: 1998
- Brazilian Champions Cup: 2000
- Torneio Rio – São Paulo: 1993, 2000
- Intercontinental Cup Runners-up: 1999

Brazil U20

- South American U-20 Championship: 1992

Brazil

- FIFA World Cup: 2002
- Copa América: 1999
- FIFA Confederations Cup: 2005

Individual

- Copa Libertadores Best Goalkeeper: 1999
- Copa Libertadores Final Most Valuable Player: 1999
- Copa Libertadores Best Newcomer: 1999
- Campeonato Paulista Best Goalkeeper: 1999, 2003, 2008
- Copa Mercosur Best Goalkeeper: 1999
- Torneio Rio – São Paulo Best Goalkeeper: 2000
- Best Latin American Goalkeeper: 1999, 2002
- IFFHS World's Best Goalkeeper fourth place: 2002
- Campeonato Brasileiro Série B Most Valuable Player: 2003
- Campeonato Brasileiro Série A Goalkeeper of the Year: 2008, 2009
