= Gustavo (footballer, born 1982) =

Brazilian footballer

Personal information
- Full name: Gustavo Franchin Schiavolin
- Date of birth: 19 February 1982 (age 44)
- Place of birth: Campinas, Brazil
- Height: 1.86 m (6 ft 1 in)
- Position: Centre-back

Youth career
- Guarani

Senior career*
Years	Team	Apps	(Gls)
2001–2002	Guarani	2	(0)
2002	Levski Sofia		
2003	Dynamo Moscow	0	(0)
2003	Goiás	1	(0)
2004	Ponte Preta	32	(0)
2005	CRB	9	(2)
2005	→ Coruripe (loan)	0	(0)
2006	Paraná	34	(2)
2007	Schalke 04	0	(0)
2007–2012	Desportivo Brasil	0	(0)
2007–2008	→ Palmeiras (loan)	51	(3)
2009	→ Cruzeiro (loan)	2	(0)
2010	→ Vasco (loan)	0	(0)
2010–2011	→ Lecce (loan)	24	(0)
2011	→ Botafogo (loan)	11	(1)
2012	→ Portuguesa (loan)	31	(0)
2013	Qingdao Jonoon	17	(1)
2014	Paraná	16	(1)
2014–2015	Atlético Paranaense	30	(1)
2015–2016	Bahia	12	(0)
2017	Avaí	3	(0)
- * Club domestic league appearances and goals

Gustavo Franchin Schiavolin (born 19 February 1982), simply known as Gustavo, is a Brazilian former professional footballer who played as a centre-back.

== Club career ==
Born in Campinas, São Paulo state, Gustavo started his career at Guarani. He made his debut in 2001 Campeonato Brasileiro Série A and played four times in 2002 Copa do Brasil.

In July 2002 Gustavo moved abroad for the first time in his career, joining Levski Sofia. In January of the following year he moved to Dynamo Moscow, but failed to make an appearance for the latter.

In July 2003, Gustavo returned to Brazil and signed for Goiás, but his only campaign ended with only one match. He subsequently agreed a deal with Ponte Preta in 2004, appearing regularly.

In June 2005, he signed an 18-month contract with Série B side CRB. He made his debut on 8 July, starting in a 3–0 loss against Portuguesa.

Gustavo appeared in only nine league matches in the season, however, and scored a brace in a 3–2 away loss against Ituano. In November, with his side already out of the competition, he was loaned to Série C club Coruripe until December, but did not play.

In 2006 Gustavo joined Série A side Paraná. On 18 December 2006, after appearing in 34 matches for the club, he signed a two-and-a-half-year contract with Schalke 04.

However, Gustavo refused to play for the German club despite signing the contract, alleging a desire to remain in his homeland for personal reasons. In April 2007, his registration rights was owned by a company, Traffic, and he was assigned to Desportivo Brasil, being subsequently loaned to Palmeiras on 1 May 2007.

Gustavo won the 2008 Campeonato Paulista with Verdão, and signed a contract extension in August, with his deal running until 31 December 2011 and the loan until 31 December 2009. On 29 January 2009, his loan was cut short, and he moved to Cruzeiro hours later, in a season-loan, with a 20% percentage if the player was sold during his spell at Raposa.

On 1 January 2010, Gustavo further extended his link with Desportivo Brasil again, until 1 September 2012. On that date, he joined Vasco da Gama, also on loan, after only appearing rarely with his former club; however, he only appeared sparingly for his new side, being mostly a backup.

On 26 July 2010, Gustavo travelled to Italy and signed a loan contract with Serie A newcomer Lecce on the following day, with a buyout clause of about €0.7 to €0.8 million. He also obtained Italian nationality though ancestry in order to by-pass the non-EU policy of FIGC.

Gustavo made his Serie A debut on 12 September 2010, starting in a 1–0 home win against Fiorentina. He finished the campaign with 24 appearances (19 starts), as his side narrowly avoided relegation.

On 2 July 2011, Gustavo returned to Brazil and signed an 18-month contract with Botafogo, and extended his contract with Desportivo Brasil until December 2012. He only started in nine matches in 2011, and was subsequently released in December.

In January 2012 Gustavo was loaned to Portuguesa. After appearing sparingly during the year's Campeonato Paulista, he appeared regularly in the national league, with Lusa finishing only one position above the relegation places.

Gustavo was released in January 2013, and joined Chinese Super League side Qingdao Jonoon in the following month. In April of the following year he moved to second-tier team Paraná, and after appearing regularly joined fierce rivals Atlético Paranaense.

== Honours ==
Paraná

- Campeonato Paranaense: 2006

Palmeiras

- Campeonato Paulista: 2008
