= Nen (footballer) =

Brazilian footballer (born 1978)

Personal information
- Full name: Francisco Assis dos Santos
- Date of birth: 3 August 1978 (age 48)
- Place of birth: Brazlândia, Federal District, Brazil
- Height: 1.80 m (5 ft 11 in)
- Position: Central defender

Youth career
- 1996–1997: Brazlândia

Senior career*
Years	Team	Apps	(Gls)
1998–2000	Gama	25	(1)
2000	ARUC-DF		
2001–2003	Gama	56	(4)
2004–2008	Palmeiras	95	(12)
2008	Atlético Mineiro		
2009–2011	Bahia		
- * Club domestic league appearances and goals

Francisco Assis dos Santos or simply Nen (born 3 August 1978), is a Brazilian former football central defender.

== Honours ==
=== Gama ===
- Brazilian Série B: 1998
- Federal District Championship: 1999, 2000, 2001, 2003

=== Palmeiras ===
- São Paulo State Championship: 2008
