= Francis (Brazilian footballer) =

Brazilian footballer (born 1982)

Personal information
- Full name: Francis José da Silva
- Date of birth: April 30, 1982 (age 44)
- Place of birth: São Vicente de Minas, Brazil
- Height: 1.80 m (5 ft 11 in)
- Position: Midfielder

Team information
- Current team: Audax

Youth career
- 2001–2002: Palmeiras

Senior career*
Years	Team	Apps	(Gls)
2003–2010	Palmeiras	64	(2)
2005	→ Ituano (loan)		
2008	→ Atlético Mineiro (loan)	5	(0)
2009	→ Marília (loan)	11	(0)
2010–2011	Bragantino	9	(0)
2011–2012	Noroeste	7	(0)
2012–2015	Audax	72	(1)
2014	→ Guaratinguetá (loan)	18	(0)
2015–	Red Bull Brasil	4	(0)
- * Club domestic league appearances and goals as of 27 August 2015

Francis José da Silva (born April 30, 1982), known as just Francis, is a Brazilian footballer who plays for Red Bull Brasil as a midfielder.

== Honours ==
- São Paulo State Championship: 2008
