= Jorge Preá =

Brazilian footballer

Personal information
- Full name: Jorge Arnaldo Pereira
- Date of birth: 10 January 1984 (age 42)
- Place of birth: São Paulo, Brasil
- Height: 1.82 m (6 ft 0 in)
- Position: Striker

Senior career*
Years	Team	Apps	(Gls)
2007	Pelotas	35	(18)
2008–2011	Palmeiras	7	(1)
2009	→ Atlético Paranaense (loan)	0	(0)
2009	→ Bragantino (loan)	2	(0)
2010	→ Mogi Mirim (loan)	4	(0)
2010	→ ABC (loan)	1	(0)
2012	Barueri	5	(3)
2013	Atlético Sorocaba	10	(0)
2014	Operário Ferroviário	7	(1)
2015	FC Cascavel	10	(1)
2016	Barretos	20	(1)
2017	Sinop	3	(0)
2018	Real Ariquemes	0	(0)
2019	Arapongas	0	(0)
- * Club domestic league appearances and goals

Jorge Arnaldo Pereira (born 10 January 1984), known as Jorge Preá, is a Brazilian former professional footballer who played as a striker.

== Early life and nickname ==
Jorge Preá was born and raised in Casa Verde, Northern São Paulo. During his childhood, a neighbor gave him the nickname Preá due to his speed. His footballing idol growing up was Serginho Chulapa.

== Career ==
Jorge Preá had a late start to his professional career. He was unsuccessful in trials for Corinthians in 1999 and Portuguesa in 2000. He only turned pro at the age of 23, after being evaluated favorably by César Sampaio during trials in Limeira to join Pelotas, a club set to compete in the Campeonato Gaúcho Second Division that season.

While at Pelotas, Preá scored three goals in his debut and finished as the tournament's top scorer. His performance drew the attention of Vanderlei Luxemburgo, who was managing Santos at the time, but he ultimately moved to South Korea.

=== Palmeiras ===
After failing to make a single appearance in South Korea due to a severe injury to his right knee, Preá returned to Brazil to undergo rehabilitation at Palmeiras, a move facilitated by César Sampaio. Vanderlei Luxemburgo, now in charge of Verdão, remembered him and asked football director Toninho Cecílio to sign him for the 2008 season.

He made his Palmeiras debut on 6 February 2008, subbing in for Léo Lima in the second half of a 3–0 defeat to Guaratinguetá in the Campeonato Paulista. On 26 March, Preá scored his first and only goal for Palmeiras. He came off the bench and scored the winning goal in stoppage time against Portuguesa.

Preá came on as a substitute again in the club's next two matches, a 3–1 home win over São Caetano in the Campeonato Paulista and a 5–1 away win over Central, in the second round of the Copa do Brasil. On 6 April, he made his first and only start for Palmeiras, against Grêmio Barueri, being replaced in the second half of a 3–0 away win. That was his last Campeonato Paulista appearance, as Palmeiras ended up champions after a 12-year-drought. He made two more appearances as a substitute in that season.

=== Loan spells ===
With the lack of playing time at Palmeiras, Preá was set to be loaned out to Mogi Mirim for the 2009 Campeonato Paulista, but instead was sent in a year-long loan to Atlético Paranaense as part of the Danilo deal. He was then loaned to Bragantino, Mogi Mirim and ABC, before playing out his contract with Palmeiras for their reserve team in 2011, failing to score a single goal.

=== Later career ===
Jorge Preá signed for Grêmio Barueri for the 2012 Campeonato Paulista Série A2. Despite emerging as the team's top scorer with three goals in the first five rounds, he tore a ligament in his right knee during the fifth match of the tournament, sidelining him for the remainder of the season.

Nevertheless, his caught the attention of newly-promoted side Atlético Sorocaba, who signed him for the 2013 Campeonato Paulista. He made 10 appearances for the club but did not score any goals. In 2014, Preá moved to Paraná, joining Operário Ferroviário, followed by a stint with FC Cascavel the following year. In 2016, he competed in Campeonato Paulista Série A2 for Barretos. After a spell with Sinop in 2017, he signed with Real Ariquemes for the 2018 season but received no wages from the club.

Subsequently, Preá began working as a storm drain cleaner in São Paulo while playing for amateur teams on weekends. He signed with Campeonato Paranaense Third Division side Arapongas in 2019, but did not make any appearances. Currently, Preá works as a delivery courier at the Mercadão da Lapa.

== Honours ==
- São Paulo State Championship: 2008
