= Traffic Sports Marketing =

Brazilian sports marketing agency

- Company type: Private
- Founded: São Paulo, Brazil (1983)
- Headquarters: São Paulo, Brazil
- Key people: Guilherme Pinciroli (International Business Manager); Jean Marc Schwartzenberg (Director of International Business)
- Parent: Traffic Group
- Subsidiaries: Traffic Sports USA
- Website: Traffic sports

Traffic Sports Marketing is a Brazilian sports marketing agency that runs Brazilian football clubs Desportivo Brasil, Ituano FC, G.D. Estoril Praia in Portugal and Fort Lauderdale Strikers in the USA.

Desportivo Brasil was a club and company created by Traffic Sports, to find and prepare promising Brazilian football newcomers to pursue careers in other clubs, including abroad.

Traffic also owns footballing rights to players including Valmir, Lulinha, Rodolfo, and Keirrison. Traffic is buying contracts for young soccer players all over Brazil, as well as Argentina. They then lend the players to teams, who pay the players a salary and also allow them to showcase their talents. If they are recruited by a big team, Traffic and its partners reap the largest share of the transfer fee.

Traffic were also awarded the global marketing rights to the 2001 FIFA Club World Championship; however the tournament would later be cancelled.

== See also ==
- Sports marketing
