= Nikola Jozić =

Serbian footballer (born 1982)

Personal information
- Date of birth: 29 September 1982 (age 44)
- Place of birth: Ludwigshafen, West Germany
- Height: 1.94 m (6 ft 4 in)
- Position: Defender

Youth career
- 1987–1995: FSV Oggersheim
- 1995–1999: Waldhof Mannheim
- 1999–2001: Eintracht Frankfurt

Senior career*
Years	Team	Apps	(Gls)
2001–2003	AJ Auxerre B	10	(1)
2004–2005	Železnik	29	(2)
2005	FSV Oggersheim	4	(0)
2006	Gaziantepspor	0	(0)
2007	Radnik Bijeljina	11	(2)
2007–2008	Gloria Buzău	19	(1)
Total		73	(6)

International career
2001	FR Yugoslavia U18	6	(0)
- * Club domestic league appearances and goals

Nikola Jozić (Serbian Cyrillic: Никола Јозић; born 29 September 1982) is a German-born Serbian retired football defender.

== Career ==
After playing with several clubs in Germany, in January 2001 he moved from Eintracht Frankfurt Reserves to French Ligue 1 club Auxerre, which would be his first senior experience. After two and a half seasons there, he moved to Serbia to play with FK Železnik where he would win a 2005 Serbia and Montenegro Cup.

He also holds German citizenship making his football debut at Eintracht Frankfurt. The 1.94 metres (6.4 ft) defender also played at Gaziantepspor.

== Position ==
Nikola played in the defense as central, left back, right back, central for the back four or central midfield.

== International ==
Jozić played with his homeland FR Yugoslavia at the 2001 UEFA European Under-18 Championship in Finland. He played 6 games for the under 18.

== Honours ==
- 2005: Serbia and Montenegro Cup
- 2003: Coupe de France
