= Éder Prudêncio =

Brazilian footballer

Personal information
- Full name: Éder Marcelo Prudêncio
- Date of birth: 14 May 1980 (age 46)
- Place of birth: Maracaí, Brazil
- Height: 1.71 m (5 ft 7 1/2 in)
- Position: Midfielder

Team information
- Current team: CRB

Senior career*
Years	Team	Apps	(Gls)
1999–2000	Paraguaçuense		
2001	Juventus		
2002–2003	Portuguesa	20	(1)
2003–2004	Marília		
2004	São Caetano	17	(0)
2005	Paraná	14	(1)
2006	Marília		
2006	Sport		
2007	Kayserispor	12	(0)
2007	Criciúma		
2008	Ituano		
2008–2009	Mirassol		
2009	Brasiliense	24	(1)
2010	Mirassol	0	(0)
2010–2011	Linense	0	(0)
2010	→ Fortaleza (loan)	8	(0)
2010	→ Bragantino (loan)	12	(2)
2011	Marília	6	(1)
2011	Nacional–MG	0	(0)
2012	Linense	0	(0)
2012–2013	São Caetano	56	(11)
2014	Red Bull Brasil	0	(0)
2014	CRB	14	(0)
2015	São Bento	0	(0)
2015	Red Bull Brasil	5	(0)
2016	Água Santa	0	(0)
2016–	CRB	10	(0)
- * Club domestic league appearances and goals as of 2 March 2017

Éder Marcelo Prudêncio (born May 14, 1980 in Maracaí), known as Éder Prudêncio or Éder Louco, is a Brazilian footballer who plays for CRB as midfielder.

== Career statistics ==
As of 2 March 2017

Club	Season	League			State League		Cup		Conmebol		Other		Total	
Club	Season	Division	Apps	Goals	Apps	Goals	Apps	Goals	Apps	Goals	Apps	Goals	Apps	Goals
Mirassol	2009	Série D	—		17	4	—		—		—		17	4
Brasiliense	2009	Série B	24	1	—		—		—		—		24	1
Mirassol	2010	Paulista	—		19	3	—		—		—		19	3
Fortaleza	2010	Série C	8	0	—		—		—		—		8	0
Bragantino	2010	Série B	12	2	—		—		—		—		12	2
Linense	2011	Paulista	—		12	4	—		—		—		12	4
Marília	2011	Série C	6	1	—		—		—		—		6	1
Linense	2012	Paulista	—		15	2	—		—		—		15	2
São Caetano	2012	Série B	36	10	—		—		—		—		36	10
São Caetano	2013	Série B	20	1	18	2	2	0	—		4 (Note: All appearance(s) in Copa Paulista)	0	44	3
São Caetano	Subtotal		56	11	18	2	2	0	—		4	0	80	13
Red Bull Brasil	2014	Paulista A2	—		17	2	—		—		—		17	2
CRB	2014	Série C	14	0	—		—		—		—		14	0
São Bento	2015	Paulista	—		11	1	—		—		—		11	1
Red Bull Brasil	2015	Série D	5	0	—		—		—		—		5	0
Água Santa	2016	Paulista	—		12	1	—		—		—		12	1
CRB	2016	Série B	10	0	—		—		—		—		10	0
Career total			135	15	121	19	2	0	0	0	4	0	262	34
