= Alex Mineiro =

Brazilian footballer (born 1975)

Personal information
- Full name: Alexander Pereira Cardoso
- Date of birth: March 15, 1975 (age 51)
- Place of birth: Belo Horizonte, Brazil
- Height: 1.75 m (5 ft 9 in)
- Position: Striker

Youth career
- 1994–1995: América-MG

Senior career*
Years	Team	Apps	(Gls)
1996	América-MG		
1997	Cruzeiro	13	(4)
1998	Vitória	18	(2)
1999	Bahia		
1999–2000	União Barbarense		
2000	Cruzeiro	7	(1)
2001–2002	Atlético Paranaense	41	(20)
2003	Tigres UANL		
2003–2007	Atlético Paranaense	37	(15)
2004	→ Atlético Mineiro (loan)	43	(15)
2005–2006	→ Kashima Antlers (loan)	58	(25)
2008	Palmeiras	35	(19)
2009	Grêmio	6	(1)
2009–2010	Atlético Paranaense	18	(2)
- * Club domestic league appearances and goals

Alexander Pereira Cardoso (born March 15, 1975), most commonly known as Alex Mineiro, is a former Brazilian football striker.

== Club statistics ==
Club performance			League		Cup		League Cup		Total	
Season	Club	League	Apps	Goals	Apps	Goals	Apps	Goals	Apps	Goals
Brazil			League		Copa do Brasil		League Cup		Total	
1997	Cruzeiro	Série A	14	4					14	4
1998	Vitória	Série A	19	4					19	4
1999	Bahia	Série B								
2000	Cruzeiro	Série A	5	0					5	0
2001	Atlético Paranaense	Série A	21	9					21	9
2002	Atlético Paranaense	Série A	16	3					16	3
Mexico			League		Cup		League Cup		Total	
2002/03	Tigres UANL	Primera División								
Brazil			League		Copa do Brasil		League Cup		Total	
2003	Atlético Paranaense	Série A	19	6					19	6
2004	Atlético Mineiro	Série A	43	15					43	15
Japan			League		Emperor's Cup		J.League Cup		Total	
2005	Kashima Antlers	J1 League	27	15	2	1	3	1	32	17
2006	Kashima Antlers	J1 League	31	10	1	1	9	5	41	16
Brazil			League		Copa do Brasil		League Cup		Total	
2007	Atlético Paranaense	Série A	28	9					28	9
2008	Palmeiras	Série A	32	19						
2009	Grêmio	Série A	7	2						
2009	Atlético Paranaense	Série A								
Country	Brazil		165	50					165	50
Country	Mexico									
Country	Japan		58	25	3	2	12	6	73	33
Total			223	75	3	2	12	6	238	83

== Honours ==
=== Club ===
Cruzeiro

- Copa Libertadores: 1997
- Minas Gerais State Championship: 1997

Atlético Paranaense

- Brazilian Série A: 2001
- Paraná State Championship: 2001, 2005

Palmeiras

- São Paulo State Championship: 2008

=== Individual ===
- Bola de Ouro: 2001
- Campeonato Paulista Top Scorer: 2008
- Campeonato Brasileiro Série A Team of the Year: 2008
