= Valmir (footballer, born 1986) =

Brazilian footballer

Personal information
- Full name: Valmir Ribeiro Siqueira
- Date of birth: October 11, 1986 (age 40)
- Place of birth: Cataguases, Brazil
- Height: 1.74 m (5 ft 9 in)
- Position: Left-back

Team information
- Current team: Penapolense

Youth career
- 2003–2005: CRB

Senior career*
Years	Team	Apps	(Gls)
2005	CRB		
2006	Cruzeiro		
2006	Denizlispor		
2007	Palmeiras B		
2007–2008	Palmeiras	19	(0)
2008	Vasco da Gama	8	(1)
2009	Ituano FC		
2010	Vitória		
2011	Santo André		
2011–	Penapolense		
- * Club domestic league appearances and goals

Valmir Ribeiro Siqueira or simply Valmir (born October 11, 1986) is a Brazilian professional footballer who plays as a left-back for Clube Atlético Penapolense.

== Career ==
Valmir was born in Cataguases. Revealed in the youth of the CRB had tickets for the cruise and unsuccessfully by Denizlispor, Turkey, to reach the Palmeiras in 2007, and stand out in the state title in 2008.

That same year, he moved to Vasco da Gama, where he campaigned as the Rio club demoted to Serie B in the Brazilian Championship.

After defending the Ituano in 2009, was hired by Vitória for the 2010 season.

== Honours ==
- São Paulo State Championship: 2008
