= Coşkun Birdal =

Turkish footballer

Personal information
- Full name: Coşkun Birdal
- Date of birth: 12 December 1973 (age 52)
- Place of birth: Bayburt, Turkey
- Position: Forward

Senior career*
Years	Team	Apps	(Gls)
1996–1997	Bayburtspor	26	(12)
1997–2000	Erzurumspor	18	(4)
2000	Konyaspor	19	(8)
2000–2002	Denizlispor	64	(19)
2002–2003	Samsunspor	8	(0)
2003–2004	Denizlispor	13	(2)
2004–2005	Manisaspor	24	(10)
2005–2007	Antalyaspor	48	(21)
2007–2008	Eskişehirspor	31	(19)
2008–2009	Diyarbakırspor	31	(6)
2009–2010	Sarıyer	14	(4)
2010	Kayseri Erciyesspor	16	(1)
2010–2011	Pendikspor	32	(11)
Total		343	(117)
- * Club domestic league appearances and goals

Coşkun Birdal (born 12 December 1973) is a retired Turkish footballer. He last played as a forward for Pendikspor in 2011.

== Career ==
Coşkun began his career at Kartalspor in his teenage years. He became professional at Bayburtspor in 1996. He has played for Bayburtspor (1994–1997), Erzurumspor (1997–2000), Konyaspor (2000), Denizlispor (2000–2002 and 2003–2004), Samsunspor (2002–2003), Vestel Manisaspor (2004–2005) and Antalyaspor during his career. He played for Antalyaspor and he has come into attention after he scored a hat-trick against Beşiktaş J.K. and Kayserispor in 2006-2007 season. He played for Eskişehirspor in 2007-2008 season and moved to Kayseri Erciyesspor in 2010.
