= André Silva (footballer, born April 1980) =

Brazilian footballer

Personal information
- Full name: André Ferreira da Silva
- Date of birth: April 9, 1980 (age 46)
- Place of birth: Tarumã, Brazil
- Height: 1.82 m (5 ft 11 1/2 in)
- Position: Defensive midfielder

Senior career*
Years	Team	Apps	(Gls)
1999	Capavariano		
2000	Paraguaçuense		
2001	Linense		
2002	Ferroviária		
2003	Independente		
2004–2005	União Barbarense		
2005–2006	Ponte Preta	28	(1)
2006–2007	Ankaragücü	46	(0)
2008	Gama	26	(2)
2009	Montedio Yamagata	0	(0)
2010	União Barbarense		
2010	CRB		
2010–2012	Atlético Sorocaba		
2012	Guarani		
2012	América-RN	0	(0)
- * Club domestic league appearances and goals as of August 28, 2009

André Ferreira da Silva (born April 9, 1980) is a Brazilian football player. He currently plays as defensive midfielder.

He formerly played for Ankaragücü in the Süper Lig and Japanese side Montedio Yamagata.
