= 2008 Campeonato Paulista =

Campeonato Paulista - Série A1
- Season: 2008
- Champions: Palmeiras (22nd title)
- Relegated: Juventus; Rio Preto; Sertãozinho; Rio Claro
- Matches played: 202
- Goals scored: 530 (2.62 per match)
- Top goalscorer: Alex Mineiro (15)

The 2008 Campeonato Paulista de Futebol Profissional da Primeira Divisão - Série A1 was the 107th season of São Paulo's top-flight professional association football league. The competition began on January 16 and ended on May 4. Palmeiras won their 22nd title with a 6–0 victory on aggregate in the finals over Ponte Preta. Palmeiras' Alex Mineiro was the top scorer, with 15 goals.

== First phase ==
=== League table ===
Pos	Team	Pld	W	D	L	GF	GA	GD	Pts	Qualification or relegation
1	Guaratinguetá	19	13	1	5	27	14	+13	40	Advances to Semifinals
2	Palmeiras	19	12	4	3	36	16	+20	40	Advances to Semifinals
3	São Paulo	19	11	5	3	31	22	+9	38	Advances to Semifinals
4	Ponte Preta	19	10	5	4	36	23	+13	35	Advances to Semifinals
5	Corinthians	19	9	6	4	24	15	+9	33	
6	Barueri	19	10	2	7	34	24	+10	32	Qualification for Campeonato do Interior
7	Santos	19	9	4	6	28	23	+5	31	
8	Mirassol	19	9	2	8	29	28	+1	29	Qualification for Campeonato do Interior
9	Noroeste	19	8	5	6	29	23	+6	29	Qualification for Campeonato do Interior
10	Portuguesa	19	7	7	5	21	17	+4	28	
11	Ituano	19	8	2	9	24	32	−8	26	Qualification for Campeonato do Interior
12	Paulista	19	7	4	8	24	24	0	25	
13	Bragantino	19	7	4	8	26	27	−1	25	
14	Marília	19	7	1	11	21	20	+1	22	
15	São Caetano	19	5	5	9	16	30	−14	20	
16	Guarani	19	5	4	10	20	31	−11	19	
17	Juventus	19	4	5	10	21	36	−15	17	Relegation to Campeonato Paulista Série A2
18	Rio Preto	19	4	3	12	16	28	−12	15	Relegation to Campeonato Paulista Série A2
19	Sertãozinho	19	4	3	12	16	30	−14	15	Relegation to Campeonato Paulista Série A2
20	Rio Claro	19	3	4	12	16	32	−16	13	Relegation to Campeonato Paulista Série A2

Updated to match(es) played on April 6, 2008. Source: RSSSF Brazil
Rules for classification: 1st points; 2nd wins; 3rd goal difference; 4th goals scored

=== Results ===
Home \ Away	BAR	BRG	COR	GUA	GRA	ITU	JUV	MAC	MIR	NOR	PAL	PTA	PON	POR	RCL	RPR	SAN	SCA	SPA	SER
Barueri		3–1	1–1			3–2				3–0	0–3		2–0		2–0	2–0				3–0
Bragantino						3–0	3–2	0–2	1–2		2–5		3–1		2–1	3–1			0–2	3–1
Corinthians		1–1		3–0	2–0		2–2	3–1	0–0		0–1	2–0		1–0	1–0					
Guarani	3–2	0–2				2–0		1–0							1–0	2–0		0–0	0–1	1–1
Guaratinguetá	2–0	1–0		3–1				1–0				2–1	0–2				0–1	0–1	1–2	2–0
Ituano			1–2		1–2		0–0					3–1		1–0	3–1	2–1		2–1	1–1	
Juventus	0–0			2–2	0–1					1–1	0–4	2–1		3–2		0–1	3–1			
Marília	1–0					2–0	4–0		0–1		0–1		0–0		3–1	3–1			3–2	
Mirassol	2–1			3–1	1–3	2–3	2–0							1–2	3–1	2–1			1–2	
Noroeste		1–1	3–2	2–1	0–1	3–0		3–2	0–1		1–0	0–0								4–0
Palmeiras				3–1	0–3	0–1			2–2				2–1	1–0		1–1		3–1	4–1	3–1
Paulista	3–0	2–1		1–1				1–0	4–1		0–2		1–2	1–1			1–1			3–2
Ponte Preta			0–1	4–2		4–2	5–2		3–2	3–2				1–1		1–0		3–0	0–0	
Portuguesa	2–3	0–0		1–0	1–1			1–0		0–0							2–0	1–0	2–0	
Rio Claro					0–3		1–0			1–2	1–1	2–0	1–1	1–1			1–1			2–1
Rio Preto			0–1		0–1					0–2		0–1		3–3	2–0		2–1	2–2		1–0
Santos	1–2	2–0	2–1	3–1		4–1		1–0	2–1	3–2	0–0		2–2							
São Caetano	1–6	0–0	3–1				0–3	1–0	0–2	2–1		0–2			2–1		0–1			
São Paulo	2–1		0–0				3–1			2–2		2–1			3–1	1–0	3–2	1–1		3–1
Sertãozinho			0–0			0–1	3–0	2–0	2–0				0–1	0–1			1–0	1–1		

Updated to match(es) played on 6 April 2008. Source: RSSSF
Legend: Blue = home team win; Yellow = draw; Red = away team win.

== Knockout phase ==
=== Bracket ===
Semi-finals
1	Guaratinguetá	0	1	1
4	Ponte Preta	1	2	3
2	São Paulo	2	0	2
3	Palmeiras	1	2	3

Finals
2	Ponte Preta	0	0	0
3	Palmeiras	1	5	6

=== Semi-finals ===
Team 1	Agg.	Team 2	1st leg	2nd leg
Ponte Preta (Brazil)	3–1	(Brazil) Guaratinguetá	1–0	2–1
São Paulo (Brazil)	2–3	(Brazil) Palmeiras	2–1	0–2

=== Finals ===
Team 1	Agg.	Team 2	1st leg	2nd leg
Ponte Preta (Brazil)	0–6	(Brazil) Palmeiras	0–1	0–5

== Top goalscorers ==
Pos	Player	Team	Goals
1	(Brazil) Alex Mineiro	Palmeiras	15
2	(Brazil) Kléber Pereira	Santos	13
3	(Brazil) Adriano	São Paulo	11
3	(Brazil) Pedrão	Barueri	11
5	(Brazil) Otacílio Neto	Noroeste	10
5	(Brazil) Borges	São Paulo	10
